= List of Eliteserien clubs =

The following is a list of clubs who have played in the top flight of Norwegian football since its establishment in 1937. All statistics here refer to time in the Norwegian top flight only, with the exception of 'Most Recent Finish' (which refers to all levels of play) and 'Last Promotion' (which refers to the club's last promotion from the second tier of Norwegian football). Eliteserien teams playing in the 2026 season are indicated in bold. Clubs labeled as "defunct" may be fully dissolved, or simply no longer active in football at a senior men's level.

As of the 2026 season, a total of 131 teams have played in the Norwegian top flight, including the abandoned 1939–40 season.

== Table ==
As of the start of the 2026 season

Club	Municipality	County	Total seasons	Total spells	Longest spell	Current spell	Most recent promotion	Most recent relegation	Seasons	Most recent finish	Highest finish
**Viking**	Stavanger	Rogaland	77	4	29	8	2018	2017	1937–1965; 1968–1986; 1989–2017; 2019–	1st	1st
**Brann**	Bergen	Vestland	69	12	28	4	2022	2021	1937–1949; 1950–1953; 1954–1956; 1957–1960; 1961–1964; 1968–1979; 1981; 1983; 1985; 1987–2014; 2016–2021; 2023–	4th	1st
**Vålerenga**	Oslo	Oslo	66	9	22	2	2024	2023	1937–1952; 1954–1957; 1959–1968; 1974–1975; 1977–1990; 1994–1996; 1998–2000; 2002–2023; 2025–	6th	1st
**Rosenborg**	Trondheim	Trøndelag	64	4	48	48	1978	1977	1937–1940; 1960–1962; 1967–1977; 1979–	7th	1st
**Lillestrøm**	Lillestrøm	Akershus	61	5	45	1	2025	2024	1937–1939; 1952–1961; 1975–2019; 2021–2024; 2026–	1. divisjon 1st; (promoted)	1st
**Molde**	Molde	Møre og Romsdal	51	8	19	19	2007	2006	1939–1948; 1957–1958; 1974–1978; 1980; 1982; 1984–1993; 1995–2006; 2008–	10th	1st
**Fredrikstad**	Fredrikstad	Østfold	46	7	29	3	2023	2012	1937–1973; 1975–1976; 1980–1982; 1984; 2004–2009; 2011–2012; 2024–	8th	1st
Odd	Skien	Telemark	44	5	16	0	2008	2024	1937–1948; 1950–1962; 1965–1967; 1999–2007; 2009–2024	1. divisjon 9th	2nd
**Start**	Kristiansand	Agder	44	13	15	1	2025	2020	1937–1948; 1959–1960; 1969; 1973–1987; 1989–1996; 2000; 2002; 2005–2007; 2009–2011; 2013–2016; 2018; 2020; 2026–	1. divisjon 2nd; (promoted)	1st
Strømsgodset	Drammen	Buskerud	39	7	19	0	2006	2025	1938–1940; 1967–1976; 1990–1991; 1994; 1996–1999; 2001; 2007–2025	15th (relegated)	1st
**Tromsø**	Tromsø	Troms	38	4	16	6	2020	2019	1986–2001; 2003–2013; 2015–2019; 2021–	3rd	2nd
Lyn	Oslo	Oslo	37	8	9	0	2000	2009	1937–1953; 1960–1969; 1971–1973; 1978; 1980–1981; 1991–1993; 1997; 2001–2009	1.divisjon 7th	1st
Skeid	Oslo	Oslo	35	5	25	0	1998	1999	1938–1970; 1972–1975; 1978–1980; 1996–1997; 1999	1. divisjon 16th; (relegated)	1st
**Bodø/Glimt**	Bodø	Nordland	31	5	13	9	2017	2016	1977–1980; 1993–2005; 2008–2009; 2014–2016; 2018–	2nd	1st
**HamKam**	Hamar	Innlandet	28	11	5	5	2021	2008	1939–1940 (as Briskebyen FL); 1947–1948; 1970–1974; 1976–1977; 1979; 1981–1983; 1986–1987; 1992–1995; 2004–2006; 2008; 2022–	11th	3rd
Stabæk	Bærum	Akershus	26	4	10	0	2022	2023	1995–2004; 2006–2012; 2014–2021; 2023	1. divisjon 11th	1st
Sarpsborg FK	Sarpsborg	Østfold	24	3	13	0	1973	1974	1937–1957; 1963–1972; 1974	4. divisjon Østfold; 8th	3rd
Moss	Moss	Østfold	23	6	9	0	1997	2002	1937–1940; 1953–1954; 1977-1985; 1987–1990; 1996; 1998–2002	1. divisjon 14th	1st
Mjøndalen	Drammen	Buskerud	23	8	6	0	2018	2021	1937–1950; 1972–1977; 1979; 1982-1983; 1985–1987; 1992; 2015; 2019–2021	1. divisjon 15th; (relegated)	2nd
**Aalesund**	Ålesund	Møre og Romsdal	21	7	11	1	2025	2023	1937–1948; 2003; 2005; 2007–2017; 2020; 2022-2023; 2026-	1. divisjon 4th; (promoted)	4th
Haugesund	Haugesund	Rogaland	19	8	16	0	2009	2025	1997–1998; 2000; 2010–2025	16th (relegated)	3rd
Sandefjord BK	Sandefjord	Vestfold	19	2	17	0	1963	1965	1938–1962; 1964–1965	4. divisjon Vestfold; 9th	7th
Bryne	Bryne	Rogaland	18	3	13	0	2024	2003	1976–1988; 2000–2003; 2025	14th (relegated)	2nd
Kongsvinger	Kongsvinger	Innlandet	18	2	17	0	2009	2010	1983–1999; 2010	1. divisjon 3rd	2nd
Sogndal	Sogndalsfjøra	Vestland	18	8	4	0	2015	2017	1982; 1988–1989; 1991–1992; 1994; 1997-1998; 2001–2004; 2011–2014; 2016–2017	1. divisjon 8th	6th
Frigg	Oslo	Oslo	16	6	7	0	1972	1973	1937–1940; 1947–1948; 1955–1958; 1961–1968; 1971; 1973	3. divisjon Group 1; 2nd	4th
**Sarpsborg 08**	Sarpsborg	Østfold	15	2	14	14	2012	2011	2011; 2013–	9th	3rd
**Sandefjord Fotball**	Sandefjord	Vestfold	14	5	7	7	2019	2018	2006–2007; 2009–2010; 2015; 2017–2018; 2020–	5th	5th
Larvik Turn	Larvik	Vestfold	13	3	10	0	1952	1962	1937–1939; 1947–1948; 1952–1962	4. divisjon Vestfold; 2nd	1st
Strømmen	Lillestrøm	Akershus	13	4	6	0	1987	1988	1949–1955; 1956–1960; 1986; 1988	2. divisjon Group 2; 1st; (promoted)	11th
Steinkjer	Steinkjer	Trøndelag	11	5	3	0	1977	1978	1937–1940; 1956–1958; 1961–1963; 1965–1967; 1978	4. divisjon Trøndelag; Group 1; 2nd	2nd
Ranheim	Trondheim	Trøndelag	10	5	4	0	2017	2019	1937–1948; 1949–1950; 1952–1953; 1954-1956; 2018–2019	1. divisjon 6th	7th
Raufoss	Raufoss	Innlandet	10	4	4	0	1972	1974	1937–1948; 1957–1960; 1964; 1973–1974	1. divisjon 13th	8th
Sparta Sarpsborg	Sarpsborg	Østfold	10	2	8	0	1956	1958	1947–1955; 1956–1958	4. divisjon Østfold; 6th	2nd
**Kristiansund BK**	Kristiansund	Møre og Romsdal	9	2	6	3	2023	2022	2017–2022; 2024–	13th	5th
Ørn Horten	Horten	Vestfold	9	2	8	0	1961	1962	1947–1952; 1961–1962	3. divisjon Group 6; 3rd	14th
Asker	Asker	Akershus	8	1	8	0	1951	1959	1951–1959	2. divisjon Group 2; 14th; (relegated)	2nd Group B
Eik Tønsberg	Tønsberg	Vestfold	8	2	5	0	1982	1985	1957–1962; 1983–1985	2. divisjon Group 1; 6th	2nd
Lisleby	Fredrikstad	Østfold	8	4	4	0	1965	1966	1937–1948; 1950–1951; 1960–1962; 1966	4. divisjon Østfold; 13th	9th
Årstad (defunct)	Bergen	Vestland	8	4	4	0	1958	1959	1937–1948; 1951–1953; 1956–1957; 1958–1959	7. divisjon Hordaland; Group 2; 7th; (2022)	6th Group B
Fram Larvik	Larvik	Vestfold	7	3	4	0	1954	1955	1937–1948; 1949–1951; 1954–1955	3. divisjon Group 6; 2nd	1st
Hødd	Ulsteinvik	Møre og Romsdal	6	3	4	0	1994	1995	1966; 1969–1972; 1995	1. divisjon 10th	8th
Pors	Porsgrunn	Telemark	6	2	5	0	1969	1970	1937–1949; 1970	2. divisjon Group 1; 8th	10th
Sandnes Ulf	Sandnes	Rogaland	6	2	3	0	2011	2014	1937–1940 (as SK Ulf); 2012–2014	2. divisjon Group 1; 1st; (promoted)	13th
Selbak	Fredrikstad	Østfold	6	3	4	0	1949	1951	1937–1938; 1939–1948; 1949–1951	4. divisjon Østfold; 9th	6th Group A
Storm	Skien	Telemark	6	1	6	0	Never promoted	1950	1937–1950	4. divisjon Telemark; 6th	6th Group A
Brage (defunct)	Trondheim	Trøndelag	5	2	4	0	1959	1960	1937–1948; 1959–1960	Dissolved in 2009	8th Group B
Freidig	Trondheim	Trøndelag	5	3	2	0	1958	1959	1947–1949; 1953–1955; 1958–1959	5. divisjon Trøndelag; Group 3; 1st; (promoted)	6th Group B
Gjøvik-Lyn	Gjøvik	Innlandet	5	2	4	0	1962	1963	1937–1948; 1963	3. divisjon Group 3; 3rd	10th
Kapp (defunct)	Østre Toten	Innlandet	5	2	4	0	1958	1959	1937–1948; 1958–1959	6. divisjon Indre Østland; Group 4; 6th; (2017)	8th Group B
Kristiansund FK (defunct)	Kristiansund	Møre og Romsdal	5	2	4	0	1950	1951	1937–1948; 1950–1951	4. divisjon Møre og Romsdal; 4th; (2020)	8th Group B
Rapid (defunct)	Moss	Østfold	5	3	2	0	1959	1961	1947–1948; 1955–1957; 1959–1961	Dissolved in 2011	4th Group B
Snøgg	Notodden	Telemark	5	2	4	0	1951	1952	1937–1948; 1951–1952	5. divisjon Telemark; 1st; (promoted)	8th Group B
Stavanger	Stavanger	Rogaland	5	2	4	0	1960	1961	1937–1948; 1960–1961	4. divisjon Rogaland; Group 1; 12th; (relegated)	8th Group A
Vard	Haugesund	Rogaland	5	2	4	0	1975	1976	1937–1948; 1976	2. divisjon Group 1; 13th; (relegated)	12th
Ålgård	Ålgård	Rogaland	5	1	5	0	1938	1950	1938–1950	4. divisjon Rogaland; Group 1; 6th	4th Group A
Borg	Skien	Telemark	4	1	4	0	Never promoted	1948	1937–1948	6. divisjon Telemark; 1st; (promoted)	3rd District IV; Group A
Brodd	Stavanger	Rogaland	4	1	4	0	Never promoted	1948	1937–1948	3. divisjon Group 5; 6th	6th District V Group B
Clausenengen (defunct)	Kristiansund	Møre og Romsdal	4	1	4	0	Never promoted	1948	1937–1948	5. divisjon Nordmøre og Romsdal; 10th; (2017)	2nd District VII
Djerv	Bergen	Vestland	4	1	4	0	Never promoted	1948	1937–1948	4. divisjon Hordaland; Group 1; 4th	1st District VI
Donn	Kristiansand	Agder	4	1	4	0	Never promoted	1948	1937–1948	4. divisjon Agder; 2nd	5th District V Group A
Drafn (defunct)	Drammen	Buskerud	4	1	4	0	Never promoted	1948	1937–1948	6. divisjon Buskerud; Group 2; 12th; (2023)	2nd District II; Group A
Flekkefjord	Flekkefjord	Agder	4	1	4	0	Never promoted	1948	1937–1948	4. divisjon Agder; 3rd	1st District V Group A
Fremad (defunct)	Lillehammer	Innlandet	4	1	4	0	Never promoted	1948	1937–1948	Dissolved in 1969	2nd District III
Geithus	Modum	Buskerud	4	3	2	0	1953	1954	1937–1939; 1947–1948; 1953–1954	6. divisjon Buskerud; 2nd	7th Group B
Grane	Arendal	Agder	4	1	4	0	Never promoted	1948	1937–1948	5. divisjon Agder; 9th	2nd District V Group A
Greåker	Sarpsborg	Østfold	4	1	4	0	1958	1962	1958–1962	5. divisjon Østfold; 9th	15th
Hamar	Hamar	Innlandet	4	1	4	0	Never promoted	1948	1937–1948	6. divisjon Indre Østland; Group 5; 7th	1st District III
Hardy (defunct)	Bergen	Vestland	4	1	4	0	Never promoted	1948	1937–1948	Dissolved in 1997	1st District VI
Kvik	Trondheim	Trøndelag	4	3	2	0	1955	1956	1939–1948; 1951–1952; 1955–1956	3. divisjon Group 2; 11th	7th Group B
Neset	Frosta	Trøndelag	4	1	4	0	Never promoted	1948	1937–1948	5. divisjon Trøndelag; Group1; 5th	1st District VIII
Nydalen (defunct)	Oslo	Oslo	4	1	4	0	Never promoted	1948	1937–1948	Defunct	1st District V Group A
Rollon	Ålesund	Møre og Romsdal	4	1	4	0	Never promoted	1948	1937–1948	4. divisjon Sunnmøre; 3rd	3rd District VII
Skien (defunct)	Skien	Telemark	4	1	4	0	Never promoted	1948	1937–1948	6. divisjon Telemark; 9th; (2006)	4th District IV; Group B
Strong (defunct)	Oslo	Oslo	4	1	4	0	Never promoted	1948	1937–1948	Dissolved in 1952	4th District II; Group A
Tønsberg Turn (defunct)	Tønsberg	Vestfold	4	1	4	0	Never promoted	1948	1937–1948	Dissolved in 1985	5th District IV; Group A
Urædd	Porsgrunn	Telemark	4	1	4	0	Never promoted	1948	1937–1948	4. divisjon Telemark; 5th	2nd District IV; Group A
Varegg	Bergen	Vestland	4	3	2	0	1955	1956	1939–1940 (as SK Pallas); 1952–1954; 1955–1956	4. divisjon Hordaland; Group 1; 1st; (promoted)	6th Group B
Vigør	Kristiansand	Agder	4	1	4	0	Never promoted	1948	1937–1948	4. divisjon Agder; 4th	1st District V Group A
Braatt (defunct)	Kristiansund	Møre og Romsdal	3	1	3	0	Never promoted	1947	1937–1940	Defunct	4th District VII
Djerv 1919	Haugesund	Rogaland	3	3	1	0	1987	1988	1937–1938; 1947–1948; 1988	3. divisjon Group 5; 3rd	12th
Fyllingen	Bergen	Vestland	3	2	2	0	1992	1993	1990–1991; 1993	7. divisjon Hordaland; Group 4; 1st; (promoted)	7th
Gjøa (defunct)	Oslo	Oslo	3	1	3	0	Never promoted	1947	1937–1940	Dissolved in 1964	3rd District II; Group B
Hønefoss	Hønefoss	Buskerud	3	2	2	0	2011	2013	2010; 2012–2013	2. divisjon Group 2; 7th	13th
Jarl	Stavanger	Rogaland	3	2	2	0	1947	1948	1937–1939; 1947–1948	5. divisjon Rogaland; Group 2; 8th	3rd District V Group B
Jevnaker	Jevnaker	Akershus	3	1	3	0	Never promoted	1947	1937–1940	4. divisjon Buskerud; 11th	2nd District II; Group B
**KFUM**	Oslo	Oslo	3	1	3	3	2023	Never relegated	2024–	12th	8th
Kvik Halden	Halden	Østfold	3	1	3	0	Never promoted	1947	1937–1940	3. divisjon Group 6; 1st; (promoted)	4th District VI
Nationalkameratene	Trondheim	Trøndelag	3	1	3	0	Never promoted	1947	1937–1940	4. divisjon Trøndelag; Group 2; 5th	5th District VIII
Skiens Grane	Skien	Telemark	3	1	3	0	1938	1948	1938–1948	5. divisjon Telemark; 6th	3rd District IV; Group B
Skiold	Drammen	Buskerud	3	1	3	0	Never promoted	1947	1937–1940	6. divisjon Buskerud; Group 2; 3rd	5th District II; Group A
Torp	Fredrikstad	Østfold	3	1	3	0	Never promoted	1947	1937–1940	6. divisjon Østfold; Group 1; 3rd	3rd District I
Vardal	Gjøvik	Innlandet	3	1	3	0	Never promoted	1947	1937–1940	6. divisjon Indre Østland; Group 4; 2nd	3rd District III
Voss	Vossevangen	Vestland	3	1	3	0	1938	1948	1938–1948	4. divisjon Hordaland; Group 1; 12th; (relegated)	4th District VI
Berger (defunct)	Drammen	Buskerud	2	1	2	0	Never promoted	1939	1937–1939	7. divisjon Group 2; 2nd; (2021)	4th District IV; Group B
Drammen	Drammen	Buskerud	2	2	1	0	1947	1948	1937–1938; 1947–1948	4. divisjon Buskerud; 2nd	4th District II; Group B
Mandalskameratene	Mandal	Agder	2	2	1	0	1947	1948	1939–1940; 1947–1948	4. divisjon Agder; 1st; (promoted)	6th District V Group A
Mjølner	Narvik	Nordland	2	2	1	0	1988	1989	1972; 1989	4. divisjon Hålogaland; 1st; (promoted)	12th
Nordlandet	Kristiansund	Møre og Romsdal	2	2	1	0	1947	1948	1938–1939; 1947–1948	5. divisjon Nordmøre og Romsdal; 5th	6th District VII
Sandaker	Oslo	Oslo	2	1	2	0	1947	1949	1947–1949	10. divisjon Oslo; Group 1; 5th	8th Group B
Strindheim	Trondheim	Trøndelag	2	2	1	0	1994	1995	1984; 1995	2. divisjon Group 2; 12th; (relegated)	12th
Tønsberg-Kameratene (defunct)	Tønsberg	Vestfold	2	2	1	0	1939	1947	1937–1938; 1939–1940	Dissolved in 1985	7th District IV; Group A
Ulefoss (defunct)	Ulefoss	Telemark	2	2	1	0	1947	1948	1939–1940; 1947–1948	4. divisjon Telemark; 10th; (2018)	5th District IV; Group B
Viggo	Bergen	Vestland	2	1	2	0	Never promoted	1939	1937–1939	5. divisjon Hordaland; Group 1; 9th	5th District VI
Birkebeineren	Drammen	Buskerud	1	1	1	0	1947	1948	1947–1948	4. divisjon Buskerud; 7th	3rd District II; Group A
Egersund	Egersund	Rogaland	1	1	1	0	1939	1947	1939–1940	1. divisjon 5th	3rd District V Group B (season abandoned)
Falken (defunct)	Trondheim	Trøndelag	1	1	1	0	1947	1948	1947–1948	Defunct	4th District VIII
Fjell (defunct)	Arendal	Agder	1	1	1	0	1938	1939	1938–1939	Dissolved in 1945	6th District V Group A
Fredensborg (defunct)	Oslo	Oslo	1	1	1	0	Never promoted	1938	1937–1938	Dissolved in 1980	2nd District II; Group B
Halsen	Larvik	Vestfold	1	1	1	0	Never promoted	1938	1937–1938	6. divisjon Vestfold; 1st; (promoted)	2nd District II; Group B
Haugar	Haugesund	Rogaland	1	1	1	0	1980	1981	1981	4. divisjon Rogaland; Group 2; 6th	11th
Holmestrand	Holmestrand	Vestfold	1	1	1	0	1938	1939	1938–1939	5. divisjon Vestfold; 3rd	7th District IV; Group B
Jerv	Grimstad	Agder	1	1	1	0	2021	2022	2022	2. divisjon Group 1; 4th	16th
Kongsberg	Kongsberg	Buskerud	1	1	1	0	1947	1948	1947–1948	5. divisjon Buskerud; 3rd	6th District II; Group B
Kragerø (defunct)	Kragerø	Telemark	1	1	1	0	Never promoted	1938	1937–1938	Dissolved in 1945	6th District V
Mesna (defunct)	Lillehammer	Innlandet	1	1	1	0	1947	1948	1947–1948	Dissolved in 1969	7th District III
Minde	Bergen	Vestland	1	1	1	0	Never promoted	1938	1937–1938	5. divisjon Hordaland; Group 1; 4th	6th District VI
Moelven	Moelv	Innlandet	1	1	1	0	Never promoted	1938	1937–1938	6. divisjon Indre Østland; Group 6; 5th	7th District III
Nessegutten	Levanger	Trøndelag	1	1	1	0	1947	1948	1947–1948	6. divisjon Trøndelag; Group 2; 8th	7th District VIII
Nordnes	Bergen	Vestland	1	1	1	0	1953	1954	1953–1954	6. divisjon Hordaland; Group 3; 8th	8th Group A
Nymark	Bergen	Vestland	1	1	1	0	1947	1948	1947–1948	4. divisjon Hordaland; Group 2; 9th	6th District VI
Orkanger	Orkanger	Trøndelag	1	1	1	0	Never promoted	1938	1937–1938	5. divisjon Trøndelag; Group 2; 1st; (promoted)	7th District VIII
Os	Bjørnafjorden	Vestland	1	1	1	0	1974	1975	1975	3. divisjon Group 4; 4th	12th
Skreia	Østre Toten	Innlandet	1	1	1	0	1938	1939	1938–1939	4. divisjon Indre Østland; 2nd	7th District III
Slemmestad	Asker	Akershus	1	1	1	0	1947	1948	1947–1948	5. divisjon Buskerud; 10th	7th District II; Group B
Solberg	Drammen	Buskerud	1	1	1	0	1939	1947	1939–1940	5. divisjon Buskerud; 11th	7th District II; Group A (season abandoned)
Sprint-Jeløy	Moss	Østfold	1	1	1	0	1947	1948	1947–1948	4. divisjon Østfold; 3rd	6th District I
Tistedalen	Halden	Østfold	1	1	1	0	1938	1939	1938–1939	5. divisjon Østfold; 12th	7th District I
Veblungsnes (defunct)	Veblungsnes	Møre og Romsdal	1	1	1	0	Never promoted	1938	1937–1938	Dissolved in 2011	6th District VII
Verdal	Verdalsøra	Trøndelag	1	1	1	0	1938	1939	1938–1939	4. divisjon Trøndelag; Group 1; 10th	7th District VIII
Vikersund	Modum	Buskerud	1	1	1	0	1939	1947	1939–1940	6. divisjon Buskerud; Group 1; 5th	7th District II; Group B (season abandoned)

== Maps ==
Current Eliteserien teams are in bold. Defunct clubs are in italics.

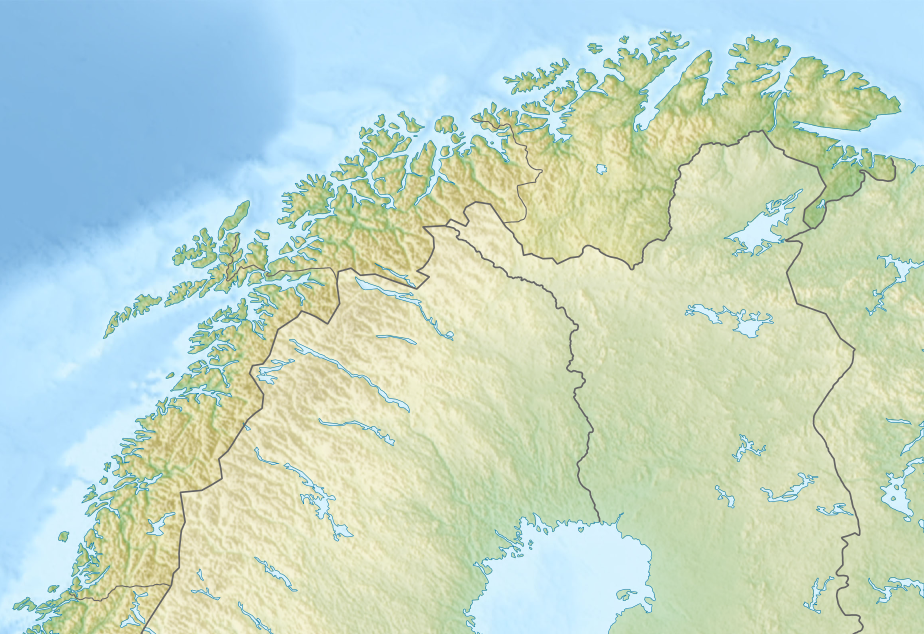
Teams from Northern Norway
Teams from Trøndelag
Teams from Møre og Romsdal
Teams from Vestland
Teams from Rogaland
Teams from Agder

Teams from Telemark
Teams from Vestfold
Teams from Buskerud
Teams from Innlandet
Teams from Akershus
Teams from Østfold
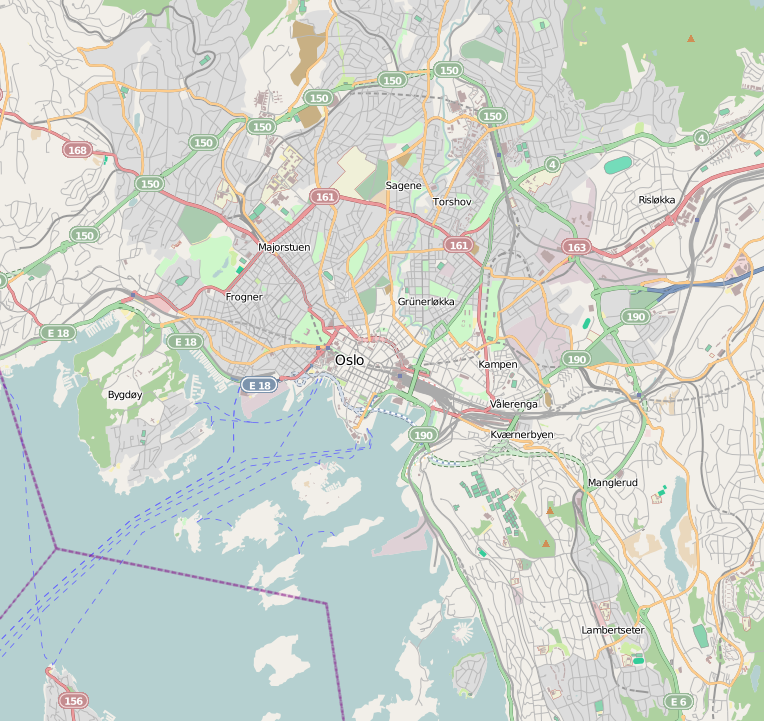
Teams from Oslo
