= 1931 Norwegian Football Cup =

Norgesmesterskapet i fotball for menn 1931

Tournament details
- Country: Norway
- Teams: 128

Final positions
- Champions: Odd (11th title)
- Runners-up: Mjøndalen

The 1931 Norwegian Football Cup was the 30th season of the Norwegian annual knockout football tournament. The tournament was open for all members of NFF, except those from Northern Norway. The final was played at Lovisenlund in Larvik on 18 October 1931, and was contested by ten-time former winners Odd and Mjøndalen, who also played in the final in 1924, which they lost. Odd won the final 4–2, and secured their eleventh title, which also was their last title in 69 years, before Odd again won the Norwegian Cup in 2000. Ørn were the defending champions, but were eliminated by Gjøa in the third round.

== Rounds and dates ==
- First round: 9 August
- Second round: 16 August
- Third round: 30 August
- Fourth round: 13 September
- Quarter-finals: 20 September
- Semi-finals: 11 October
- Final: 18 October

== First round ==
Team 1	Score	Team 2
Bangsund	3–2	Namsos
Birkebeineren	2–2 (a.e.t.)	Tønsberg-Kameratene
Braatt	2–2 (a.e.t.)	Rollon
Brann	7–0	Høyanger
Briskebyen	2–6	Lillestrøm
Brodd	2–4 (a.e.t.)	Flekkefjord
Bygdø BK	0–2	Gjøa
Bøn	1–0	Fremad Lillehammer
Drafn	10–0	Hasle
Drøbak	0–5	Lisleby
Dæhlenengen	5–1	Strømmen BK
Egersund	4–0	Donn
Eidsvold Turn	0–1	Lyn (Gjøvik)
Falk	3–2	Eiker
Fossekallen	0–2	Vålerengen
Fredrikstad	18–1	Stabæk
Freidig	1–3	Ranheim
Grane (Arendal)	2–3	Vigør
Grue	4–1	Trysilgutten
Hardy	9–2	Minde
Holmestrand	7–0	Gråbein
Jevnaker	3–6	Berger
Kongsvinger	0–7	Frigg
Kragerø	0–9	Fram (Larvik)
Kvik (Halden)	5–2	Grane (Sandvika)
Kvik (Trondheim)	10–0	Steinkjer
Larvik Turn	3–1 (a.e.t.)	Skiens-Grane
Lierfoss	0–5	Tistedalen
Lyn	3–2 (a.e.t.)	Torp
Molde	1–8	Kristiansund
National	1–7	Neset
Nordstrand	2–1	Ski
Norrøna (Strømmen)	2–5	Liv
Nydalen	3–0	Haga
Odd	9–1	Tell
Orkanger	4–6 (a.e.t.)	Rapp
Raufoss	12–0	Sand
Rjukan	3–1	Skiens BK
Roy (Hurum)	3–5	Ørn
Sandefjord	2–4	Storm
Selbak	11–0	Fremad Filtvet
Snøgg	1–12	Mjøndalen
Start	5–0	Trauma
Strinda	0–6	Brage
Strong	12–2	Årnes
Strømsgodset	2–1	Geithus
Sverre	4–0	Harran
Sørumsand	5–3	Eidsvold IF
Trygg (Oslo)	0–1	Moss
Tynset	1–6	Hamar
Tønsberg Turn	4–0	Kongsberg
Ulefoss	0–2	Pors
Ulf	3–6	Stavanger
Ullensaker	4–2	Kapp
Urædd	14–0	Eydehavn
Vard	5–2	Stord
Vardal	5–1	Skeid
Vestfossen	0–4	Drammens BK
Vikersund	1–2	Skiold
Viking	3–1	Jarl
Voss	0–1	Djerv
Aalesund	3–0	Ny-Solheim
Årstad	3–5	Ulabrand
Ås	0–12	Sarpsborg
Replay
Tønsberg-Kameratene	3–4	Birkebeineren
Rollon	3–1	Braatt

== Second round ==
Team 1	Score	Team 2
Bøn	1–3	Lyn
Djerv	12–0	Ulabrand
Drammens BK	3–1	Selbak
Egersund	1–6	Brann
Flekkefjord	0–3	Viking
Fram (Larvik)	14–0	Rjukan
Frigg	3–1	Tønsberg Turn
Lyn (Gjøvik)	3–2	Aalesund
Hamar	1–2	Gjøa
Hardy	3–1	Strong
Kristiansund	2–1	Sverre
Lillestrøm	3–2	Grue
Lisleby	16–2	Ullensaker
Liv	0–2	Drafn
Mjøndalen	16–0	Sørumsand
Moss	0–2	Larvik Turn
Neset	0–3	Brage
Odd	9–1	Holmestrand
Pors	2–3	Dæhlenengen
Ranheim	1–4	Kvik (Trondheim)
Rapp	8–1	Bangsund
Raufoss	0–5	Strømsgodset
Rollon	3–2 (a.e.t.)	Vardal
Sarpsborg	8–0	Nordstrand
Skiold	6–1	Kvik (Halden)
Stavanger	7–1	Vard
Storm	1–2	Fredrikstad
Tistedalen	0–1	Falk
Urædd	3–1	Birkebeineren
Vigør	1–2	Start
Vålerengen	1–0	Nydalen
Ørn	5–1	Berger

== Third round ==
Team 1	Score	Team 2
Brage	6–0	Rapp
Brann	2–1	Stavanger
Drafn	2–2 (a.e.t.)	Frigg
Dæhlenengen	2–1	Skiold
Falk	3–2 (a.e.t.)	Drammens BK
Fredrikstad	3–0	Vålerengen
Gjøa	3–0	Ørn
Kvik (Trondheim)	3–5	Kristiansund
Larvik Turn	1–1 (a.e.t.)	Start
Lillestrøm	3–4 (a.e.t.)	Lisleby
Lyn	6–1	Hardy
Odd	3–2	Lyn (Gjøvik)
Sarpsborg	4–0	Rollon
Strømsgodset	0–3	Fram (Larvik)
Urædd	2–3	Mjøndalen
Viking	4–0	Djerv
Replay
Frigg	0–1	Drafn
Start	5–4	Larvik Turn

== Fourth round ==
Team 1	Score	Team 2
Brage	0–3	Brann
Fram (Larvik)	6–1	Drafn
Fredrikstad	3–0 (Note: Played in Sandefjord.)	Falk
Gjøa	0–0 (a.e.t.)	Odd
Kristiansund	0–2	Sarpsborg
Lisleby	3–0	Dæhlenengen
Mjøndalen	8–0	Start
Viking	1–4 (Note: Played in Bergen.)	Lyn
Replay
Odd	4–2	Gjøa

== Quarter-finals ==
Team 1	Score	Team 2
Brann	3–3 (a.e.t.)	Mjøndalen
Fredrikstad	1–2	Lisleby
Lyn	2–3	Odd
Sarpsborg	1–6	Fram (Larvik)
Replay
Mjøndalen	3–2 (a.e.t.)	Brann

== Semi-finals ==
Team 1	Score	Team 2
Mjøndalen	2–1 (Note: Played in Oslo.)	Fram (Larvik)
Odd	2–1 (a.e.t.)	Lisleby

== Final ==
18 October 1931

Odd	3–1	Mjøndalen
Pedersen 5'; Eriksen 26'; Gundersen 87'	Report	Hval 42'

Lovisenlund, Larvik
Attendance: 13,000
Referee: Bjarne H. Bech (Ørn)

== See also ==
- 1931 in Norwegian football
