= 1934 Norwegian Football Cup =

Norgesmesterskapet i fotball for menn 1934

Tournament details
- Country: Norway
- Teams: 128 (main competition)

Final positions
- Champions: Mjøndalen (2nd title)
- Runners-up: Sarpsborg

The 1934 Norwegian Football Cup was the 33rd season of the Norwegian annual knockout football tournament. The tournament was open for all members of NFF, except those from Northern Norway. The final was played at Sorgenfri gressbane in Trondheim on 14 October 1934, and was contested by the defending champions Mjøndalen and the two-time former winners Sarpsborg. Mjøndalen successfully defended their title with a 2–1 victory after extra time, securing their second Norwegian Cup trophy.

== Rounds and dates ==
- First round: 5 August
- Second round: 12 August
- Third round: 26 August
- Fourth round: 9 September
- Quarter-finals: 16 September
- Semi-finals: 30 September
- Final: 14 October

== First round ==
Team 1	Score	Team 2
Aalesund	5–2	Clausenengen
Åmot	1–7	Mjøndalen
Berger	4–1	Roy (Hurum)
Borg	10–2	Sandaker
Braatt	3–2 (a.e.t.)	Rollon
Brage	8–2	Namsos
Brann	4–1	Årstad
Briskebyen	0–1	Brane (Roverud)
Djerv	2–1	Ny-Solheim
Donn	1–0	Egersund
Drammens BK	3–1	Ski
Drøbak	0–5	Selbak
Eidsvold IF	0–4	Raufoss
Eiker	0–1	Rjukan
Flekkefjord	0–1	Brodd
Fram (Larvik)	9–1	Bjart
Fremad Lillehammer	5–0	Ullensaker
Frigg	12–0	Norrøna (Strømmen)
Geithus	4–0	Stabæk
Grane (Arendal)	1–5	Skiens-Grane
Haga	2–3	Bøn
Hamar	7–2	Tynset
Hardy	15–0	Høyanger
Holmestrand	1–3	Dæhlenengen
Jevnaker	8–0	Voss
Kapp	1–2	Nydalen
Kjelsås	1–4	Gjøa
Kongsberg	0–3	Pors
Kongsvinger	10–2	Trysilgutten
Kragerø	1–4	Start
Kristiansund	6–2	Veblungsnes
Lillestrøm	2–0	Sørumsand
Lisleby	7–0	Kampørn
Liv	1–2	Strømsgodset
Lyn (Gjøvik)	7–0	Ottestad
Neset	0–2	Rosenborg
Odd	3–5	Skotfoss
Orkanger	4–1	Tryggkameratene
Ørn	2–1	Kongsten
Ranheim	4–1	National
Sandefjord BK	1–8	Moss
Sarpsborg	10–0	Ready
Skeid	1–3	Kvik (Halden)
Skiens BK	1–2	Drafn
Skiold	4–0	Fredensborg
Solberg	4–0	Larvik Turn
Søndre Land	0–4	Lyn
Sparta (Drammen)	0–4	Fredrikstad
Stavager	4–1	Jarl
Steinkjer	2–3 (a.e.t.)	Freidig
Strinda	1–12	Kvik (Trondheim)
Strømmen BK	1–4	Gleng
Sverre	0–2	Rapp
Tistedalen	5–1	Lierfoss
Torp	7–0	Askim
Tønsberg-Kameratene	1–2	Storm
Ulf	4–3 (a.e.t.)	Ålgård
Urædd	2–3	Snøgg
Vålerengen	5–0	Bygdø BK
Vardal	1–0	BSK av 1914
Vennesla	0–2	Vigør
Vestfossen	1–1 (a.e.t.)	Tønsberg Turn
Vikersund	3–1	Falk
Viking	5–0	Djerv 1919
Replay
Tønsberg Turn	4–0	Vestfossen

== Second round ==
Team 1	Score	Team 2
Aalesund	5–0	Braatt
Brodd	1–3	Stavanger
Bøn	1–2	Lyn (Gjøvik)
Drafn	3–1	Vardal
Dæhlenengen	0–0 (a.e.t.)	Brann
Fredrikstad	16–1	Kongsvinger
Freidig	0–5	Brage
Gjøa	1–1 (a.e.t.)	Fremad Lillehammer
Gleng	0–2	Frigg
Hamar	3–2 (a.e.t.)	Vålerengen
Hardy	2–1	Skiold
Jevnaker	1–1 (a.e.t.)	Djerv
Kvik (Halden)	4–1	Brane (Roverud)
Kvik (Trondheim)	4–2	Kristiansund
Lyn	3–0	Solberg
Mjøndalen	9–1	Tistedalen
Moss	3–0	Lillestrøm
Nydalen	1–3	Ørn
Pors	2–1	Donn
Rapp	4–0	Orkanger
Raufoss	4–2	Torp
Rosenborg	2–4	Ranheim
Selbak	4–1	Berger
Skiens-Grane	1–2	Fram (Larvik)
Skotfoss	2–1	Borg
Snøgg	3–3 (a.e.t.)	Rjukan
Start	4–0	Vigør
Storm	3–2	Geithus
Strømsgodset	2–2 (a.e.t.)	Lisleby
Tønsberg Turn	1–2	Drammens BK
Ulf	1–3	Viking
Vikersund	2–5	Sarpsborg
Replay
Brann	0–1	Dæhlenengen
Djerv	1–0	Jevnaker
Fremad Lillehammer	1–4	Gjøa
Lisleby	1–0	Strømsgodset
Rjukan	1–2	Snøgg

== Third round ==
Team 1	Score	Team 2
Djerv	2–3 (a.e.t.)	Kvik (Halden)
Drammens BK	2–1	Hardy
Fram (Larvik)	2–2 (a.e.t.)	Gjøa
Frigg	5–2	Skotfoss
Kvik (Trondheim)	3–1	Selbak
Lisleby	3–1	Hamar
Lyn (Gjøvik)	2–2 (a.e.t.)	Lyn
Mjøndalen	6–0	Rapp
Moss	4–0	Dæhlenengen
Ørn	0–1	Raufoss
Ranheim	1–0	Brage
Sarpsborg	4–1	Aalesund
Snøgg	1–2	Drafn
Start	3–0	Stavanger
Storm	0–3	Fredrikstad
Viking	1–2	Pors
Replay
Gjøa	1–0	Fram (Larvik)
Lyn	5–1	Lyn (Gjøvik)

== Fourth round ==
Team 1	Score	Team 2
Drafn	4–1	Kvik (Trondheim)
Fredrikstad	3–4 (a.e.t.)	Frigg
Gjøa	4–1	Start
Kvik (Halden)	2–3	Drammens BK
Lyn	3–3 (a.e.t.)	Lisleby
Ranheim	1–2	Moss
Raufoss	1–8	Mjøndalen
Pors	3–3 (a.e.t.)	Sarpsborg
Replay
Lisleby	1–0	Lyn
Sarpsborg	3–3 (a.e.t.)	Pors
2nd replay
Pors	0–0 (a.e.t.)	Sarpsborg
3rd replay
Sarpsborg	1–0	Pors

== Quarter-finals ==
Team 1	Score	Team 2
Drafn	3–1	Gjøa
Frigg	2–1	Moss
Mjøndalen	3–2	Lisleby
Sarpsborg	3–0 (a.e.t.) (Note: Played in Fredrikstad.)	Drammens BK

== Semi-finals ==
Team 1	Score	Team 2
Frigg	1–3 (a.e.t.)	Mjøndalen
Sarpsborg	1–0	Drafn

== Final ==
14 October 1934

Mjøndalen	2–1 (a.e.t.)	Sarpsborg
E. Andersen 74'; Hval 116' (pen.)	Report	Gundersen 66'

Sorgenfri gressbane, Trondhiem
Attendance: 8,000
Referee: Kolbjørn Dæhlen (Skeid)

== See also ==
- 1934 in Norwegian football
