= 1935 Norwegian Football Cup =

Norgesmesterskapet i fotball for menn 1935

Tournament details
- Country: Norway
- Teams: 128 (main competition)

Final positions
- Champions: Fredrikstad (2nd title)
- Runners-up: Sarpsborg

The 1935 Norwegian Football Cup was the 34th season of the Norwegian annual knockout football tournament. The tournament was open for all members of NFF, except those from Northern Norway. The final was played at Sarpsborg Stadion in Sarpsborg on 20 October 1935, and Fredrikstad secured their second title with a 4–0 win against local rivals Sarpsborg, who lost their second consecutive cup final.

== Rounds and dates ==
- First round: 4 August
- Second round: 18 August
- Third round: 1 September
- Fourth round: 15 September
- Quarter-finals: 29 September
- Semi-finals: 6 October
- Final: 20 October

== First round ==
Team 1	Score	Team 2
Aalesund	3–1	Guard
B.14	1–1 (a.e.t.)	Liseby
Briskebyen	1–2 (a.e.t.)	Frigg
Bygdø BK	2–1 (a.e.t.)	Drafn
Djerv	12–1	Eidsvåg (Bergen)
Drøbak	1–9	Ørn
Egersund	0–1	Brodd
Eidsvold	3–1	Fredensborg
Eiker	0–0 (a.e.t.)	Glassverket
Falk	3–1	Tistedalen
Flekkefjord	1–2	Jarl
Fossekallen	0–2	Drammens BK
Fredrikstad	10–2	Frogg
Fremad Lillehammer	6–3	Moelven
Frøya (Bergen)	2–4	Stavanger
Geithus	0–3	Skiens-Grane
Grane	1–3 (a.e.t.)	Donn
Hardy	8–0	Fjellkameratene
Holmestrand	1–2	Gjøa
Jevnaker	7–1	Solberg
Kapp	4–11	Vålerengen
Kristiansund	3–1	Braatt
Kvik Halden	2–0	Borre
Kvik (Trondheim)	6–3	Tynset
Langesund	0–4	Odd
Larvik Turn	7–2	Gresvik
Lillestrøm	5–0	Haga
Lyn	7–0	Sparta (Drammen)
Minde	1–9	Brann
Mjøndalen	4–0	Kongsten
Moss	5–1	Holmen
Neset	5–1	Rollo
Nydalen	6–0	Gleng
Orkanger	2–6	Brage
Pors	4–0	Tønsberg-Kameratene
Ranheim	6–1	Blink
Rapp	0–4	Freidig
Raufoss	8–0	Stange
Rjukan	2–3	Vikersund
Rollon	3–1	Hødd
Roy (Hurum)	2–2 (a.e.t.)	Liv
Sandefjord	1–5	Borg
Selbak	6–1	Trygg (Oslo)
Skiens BK	3–2	Berger
Skiold	3–1	Åmot
Skotfoss	1–2	Fram
Skreia	1–5	Lyn (Gjøvik)
Snøgg	4–1	Vestfossen
Sørumsand	0–10	Sarpsborg
Stabæk	2–1	Dæhlenengen
Start	3–1	Urædd
Steinkjer	16–0	Spillum
Storm	2–0	Kongsberg
Strømsgodset	1–1 (a.e.t.)	Kampørn
Sverre	2–1	Rosenborg
Tønsberg Turn	3–1	Rolvsøy
Torp	0–2	Sandaker
Ulf	3–1 (a.e.t.)	Årstad
Ullensaker	1–1 (a.e.t.)	Hamar
Vardal	3–4	Strømmen
Vard	11–2	Etne
Veblungsnes	1–3	Clausenengen
Vigør	1–2	Mandalskameratene
Viking	3–1	Ålgård
Replay
Glassverket	1–2	Eiker
Hamar	5–0	Ullensaker
Kampørn	2–2 (a.e.t.)	Strømsgodset
Liseby	4–1	B.14
Liv	2–1	Roy (Hurum)
2nd replay
Strømsgodset	3–0	Kampørn

== Second round ==
Team 1	Score	Team 2
Borg	3–0	Bygdø BK
Brage	3–5 (a.e.t.)	Aalesund
Brodd	1–0	Brann
Clausenengen	0–2	Raufoss
Djerv	1–2	Viking
Donn	0–5	Larvik Turn
Drammens BK	2–2 (a.e.t.)	Storm
Fram	7–1	Eiker
Fremad Lillehammer	5–3	Sandaker
Frigg	7–3	Lillestrøm
Gjøa	4–6	Falk
Lyn (Gjøvik)	1–1 (a.e.t.)	Strømsgodset
Hamar	0–4	Moss
Kvik (Trondheim)	1–2	Neset
Lisleby	2–1	Jevnaker
Liv	2–0	Skiold
Nydalen	1–2	Selbak
Odd	2–1	Start
Ørn	10–1	Skiens BK
Pors	3–0	Snøgg
Rollon	2–2 (a.e.t.)	Kristiansund
Sarpsborg	3–0	Stabæk
Skiens-Grane	0–6	Lyn
Stavanger	6–0	Mandalskameratene
Steinkjer	2–4	Ranheim
Strømmen	3–5	Kvik Halden
Sverre	3–3 (a.e.t.)	Freidig
Tønsberg Turn	1–0	Mjøndalen
Ulf	1–3	Hardy
Vålerengen	3–1	Eidsvold
Vard	2–5	Jarl
Vikersund	0–5	Fredrikstad
Replay
Freidig	4–1	Sverre
Kristiansund	1–2 (a.e.t.)	Rollon
Storm	0–1	Drammens BK
Strømsgodset	0–1	Lyn (Gjøvik)

== Third round ==
Team 1	Score	Team 2
Aalesund	5–1	Lyn (Gjøvik)
Borg	3–5 (a.e.t.)	Sarpsborg
Drammens BK	3–1	Ørn
Falk	1–2	Vålerengen
Fredrikstad	9–0	Rollon
Freidig	1–2	Fram
Hardy	1–0	Tønsberg Turn
Kvik Halden	1–4	Odd
Larvik Turn	2–4	Lisleby
Lyn	4–0	Pors
Moss	4–1	Fremad Lillehammer
Ranheim	2–3	Neset
Raufoss	3–0	Liv
Selbak	3–1	Frigg
Stavanger	2–1	Jarl
Viking	4–0	Brodd

== Fourth round ==
Team 1	Score	Team 2
Fram	1–1 (a.e.t.)	Lyn
Hardy	3–1	Moss
Lisleby	5–4	Aalesund
Neset	1–2 (a.e.t.)	Drammens BK
Odd	4–2	Selbak
Sarpsborg	6–1	Raufoss
Stavanger	0–7	Fredrikstad
Vålerengen	0–1	Viking
Replay
Lyn	3–1	Fram

== Quarter-finals ==
Team 1	Score	Team 2
Drammens BK	0–4	Hardy
Fredrikstad	4–3	Odd
Lyn	3–3 (a.e.t.)	Sarpsborg
Viking	7–0	Lisleby
Replay
Sarpsborg	4–1	Lyn

== Semi-finals ==
Team 1	Score	Team 2
Hardy	0–3	Fredrikstad
Sarpsborg	2–1 (Note: Played at Ullevaal Stadion in Oslo.)	Viking

== Final ==
20 October 1935

Fredrikstad	4–0	Sarpsborg
Ileby 15'; Børresen 55'; Brynildsen 85', 86'	Report

Sarpsborg Stadion, Sarpsborg
Attendance: 15,200
Referee: Thoralf Christiansen (Stavanger)

== See also ==
- 1935 in Norwegian football
