= 1939–40 League of Norway =

3rd season of top-tier football league in Norway

Norgesserien
- Season: 1939–40
- Champions: N/A (season abandoned)

The abandoned 1939–40 Norgesserien would have been the 3rd season of top division football in Norway. The season was interrupted due to German occupation on April 9, 1940, during World War II.

== District I ==
Pos	Team	Pld	W	D	L	GF	GA	GD	Pts
1	Moss FK	8	5	2	1	20	10	+10	12
2	Sarpsborg FK	7	5	0	2	26	9	+17	10
3	Fredrikstad FK	8	4	2	2	27	16	+11	10
4	Selbak TIF	7	3	1	3	12	22	−10	7
5	Torp	7	3	0	4	15	14	+1	6
6	Kvik Halden FK	7	1	2	4	10	19	−9	4
7	Lisleby FK	8	1	1	6	8	28	−20	3

== District II, Group A ==
Pos	Team	Pld	W	D	L	GF	GA	GD	Pts
1	Mjøndalen IF	8	7	1	0	24	3	+21	15
2	SK Gjøa	8	3	3	2	18	15	+3	9
3	Skeid	8	4	0	4	23	23	0	8
4	SK Strong	9	4	0	5	18	18	0	8
5	SBK Skiold	8	3	1	4	18	19	−1	7
6	Jevnaker IF	9	3	0	6	22	32	−10	6
7	Solberg SK	8	2	1	5	14	27	−13	5

== District II, Group B ==
Pos	Team	Pld	W	D	L	GF	GA	GD	Pts
1	Lyn	7	6	0	1	30	10	+20	12
2	Frigg	8	4	2	2	25	17	+8	10
3	SBK Drafn	8	4	1	3	17	14	+3	9
4	Nydalen	8	3	3	2	17	16	+1	9
5	Strømsgodset IF	8	3	1	4	11	22	−11	7
6	Vålerengen	7	1	2	4	8	15	−7	4
7	Vikersund IF	8	1	1	6	11	25	−14	3

== District III ==
Pos	Team	Pld	W	D	L	GF	GA	GD	Pts
1	Hamar IL	9	7	2	0	28	6	+22	16
2	FK Lyn	10	6	2	2	34	13	+21	14
3	Vardal IF	10	5	2	3	17	22	−5	12
4	Briskebyen FL	9	5	1	3	21	14	+7	11
5	Fremad	9	1	4	4	5	15	−10	6
6	Kapp IF	10	1	2	7	9	30	−21	4
7	Raufoss IL	9	1	1	7	15	29	−14	3

== District IV, Group A ==
Pos	Team	Pld	W	D	L	GF	GA	GD	Pts
1	Odd	9	7	2	0	32	6	+26	16
2	Fram	9	6	2	1	28	14	+14	14
3	Tønsberg Turn	9	5	1	3	21	16	+5	11
4	Urædd	9	5	1	3	19	16	+3	11
5	Skiens BK	8	4	0	4	16	16	0	8
6	Ulefoss	9	1	0	8	8	22	−14	2
7	Borg	9	0	0	9	9	43	−34	0

== District IV, Group B ==
Pos	Team	Pld	W	D	L	GF	GA	GD	Pts
1	Ørn	9	5	3	1	18	11	+7	13
2	Snøgg	9	5	2	2	18	13	+5	12
3	Skiens Grane	9	4	3	2	28	14	+14	11
4	Tønsbergkam	9	5	0	4	28	20	+8	10
5	Storm	10	3	2	5	20	25	−5	8
6	Pors	9	3	1	5	15	19	−4	7
7	Sandefjord	9	1	1	7	17	42	−25	3

== District V, Group A ==
Pos	Team	Pld	W	D	L	GF	GA	GD	Pts
1	FK Donn	7	5	1	1	21	11	+10	11
2	IK Start	7	3	4	0	11	7	+4	10
3	Grane Arendal	8	3	0	5	14	13	+1	6
4	Flekkefjord FK	7	2	1	4	10	14	−4	5
5	FK Mandalskameratene	7	2	1	4	9	14	−5	5
6	FK Vigør	6	2	1	3	8	14	−6	5

== District V, Group B ==
Pos	Team	Pld	W	D	L	GF	GA	GD	Pts
1	Viking	8	7	1	0	31	8	+23	15
2	Stavanger	9	6	1	2	22	18	+4	13
3	Egersund	9	5	1	3	19	20	−1	11
4	Vard	9	4	1	4	17	17	0	9
5	Ålgård	9	3	2	4	18	19	−1	8
6	Brodd	9	1	2	6	9	24	−15	4
7	Ulf	9	1	0	8	9	19	−10	2

== District VI ==
Pos	Team	Pld	W	D	L	GF	GA	GD	Pts
1	Hardy	7	6	0	1	22	9	+13	12
2	Voss	7	4	0	3	19	13	+6	8
3	Brann	7	3	0	4	15	16	−1	6
4	Djerv	7	3	0	4	15	16	−1	6
5	Årstad	7	3	0	4	11	23	−12	6
6	Pallas	7	2	0	5	14	19	−5	4

== District VII ==
Pos	Team	Pld	W	D	L	GF	GA	GD	Pts
1	Kristiansund FK	5	5	0	0	31	6	+25	10
2	Aalesunds FK	6	5	0	1	19	11	+8	10
3	Clausenengen FK	5	1	2	2	10	19	−9	4
4	IL Braatt	5	1	1	3	12	12	0	3
5	SPK Rollon	5	1	1	3	10	23	−13	3
6	Molde FK	6	1	0	5	8	19	−11	2

== District VIII ==
Pos	Team	Pld	W	D	L	GF	GA	GD	Pts
1	Neset	9	6	2	1	24	7	+17	14
2	Kvik	9	6	1	2	24	15	+9	13
3	Ranheim	9	4	3	2	15	8	+7	11
4	Rosenborg	9	3	2	4	21	23	−2	8
5	Steinkjer	10	3	2	5	19	30	−11	8
6	Brage	9	2	1	6	19	23	−4	5
7	National	9	2	1	6	13	29	−16	5
