= 1937–38 League of Norway =

1st season of top-tier football league in Norway

Norgesserien
- Season: 1937–38
- Champions: Fredrikstad; 1st title
- Relegated: Selbak; Drammens BK; Fredensborg; Moelven; Tønsberg-Kameratene; Halsen; Kragerø; Djerv 1919; Minde; Veblungsnes; Orkanger

The 1937–38 Norgesserien was the 1st season of top division football in Norway.

== League tables ==
=== District I ===
Pos	Team	Pld	W	D	L	GF	GA	GD	Pts	Qualification or relegation
1	Fredrikstad FK (C)	12	9	1	2	30	10	+20	19	Qualification for the championship play-offs quarter-final
2	Kvik Halden FK	12	8	2	2	27	17	+10	18	
3	Sarpsborg FK	12	7	1	4	37	19	+18	15	
4	Moss FK	12	5	1	6	28	31	−3	11	
5	Torp IF	12	3	2	7	17	26	−9	8	
6	Lisleby FK	12	3	2	7	18	33	−15	8	
7	Selbak TIF (R)	12	2	1	9	11	32	−21	5	Relegation

(C) Champions; (R) Relegated

=== District II, Group A ===
Pos	Team	Pld	W	D	L	GF	GA	GD	Pts	Qualification or relegation
1	SFK Lyn	12	9	2	1	41	10	+31	20	Qualification for the championship play-offs preliminary round
2	SK Drafn	12	9	1	2	26	11	+15	19	
3	Geithus IL	12	6	2	4	20	26	−6	14	
4	SK Strong	12	5	1	6	24	22	+2	11	
5	Frigg Oslo FK	12	3	3	6	16	23	−7	9	
6	Lillestrøm SK	12	3	1	8	20	32	−12	7	
7	Drammens BK (R)	12	1	2	9	13	36	−23	4	Relegation

(R) Relegated

=== District II, Group B ===
Pos	Team	Pld	W	D	L	GF	GA	GD	Pts	Qualification or relegation
1	Mjøndalen IF	12	10	1	1	53	8	+45	21	Qualification for the championship play-offs preliminary round
2	Jevnaker IF	12	5	5	2	25	19	+6	15	
3	SK Gjøa	12	5	4	3	34	25	+9	14	
4	Vålerengens IF	12	4	4	4	16	24	−8	12	
5	Nydalen IL	12	5	0	7	27	26	+1	10	
6	SBK Skiold	12	4	2	6	23	24	−1	10	
7	Fredensborg (R)	12	1	0	11	6	58	−52	2	Relegation

(R) Relegated

=== District III ===
Pos	Team	Pld	W	D	L	GF	GA	GD	Pts	Qualification or relegation
1	FK Lyn (Gjøvik)	12	8	1	3	29	18	+11	17	Qualification for the championship play-offs quarter-final
2	Fremad	12	7	1	4	26	25	+1	15	
3	Hamar IL	12	6	2	4	38	22	+16	14	
4	Vardal IF	12	6	2	4	30	21	+9	14	
5	Raufoss IL	12	6	1	5	27	26	+1	13	
6	Kapp IF	12	3	1	8	18	30	−12	7	
7	Moelven IL (R)	12	2	0	10	11	37	−26	4	Relegation

(R) Relegated

=== District IV, Group A ===
Pos	Team	Pld	W	D	L	GF	GA	GD	Pts	Qualification or relegation
1	Odd BK	12	10	0	2	43	9	+34	20	Qualification for the championship play-offs preliminary round
2	IF Urædd	12	7	1	4	24	21	+3	15	
3	IF Borg	12	5	3	4	34	35	−1	13	
4	Ørn	12	5	2	5	24	29	−5	12	
5	SK Snøgg	12	4	3	5	18	25	−7	11	
6	Larvik TIF	12	3	1	8	20	31	−11	7	
7	IF Tønsberg-Kameratene (R)	12	2	2	8	13	26	−13	6	Relegation

(R) Relegated

=== District IV, Group B ===
Pos	Team	Pld	W	D	L	GF	GA	GD	Pts	Qualification or relegation
1	IF Fram	12	9	1	2	32	10	+22	19	Qualification for the championship play-offs preliminary round
2	IF Pors	12	8	2	2	33	23	+10	18	
3	Storm BK	12	7	1	4	31	13	+18	15	
4	Berger IL	12	6	0	6	34	25	+9	12	
5	Skiens BK	12	6	0	6	25	35	−10	12	
6	Tønsberg TF	12	3	0	9	16	33	−17	6	
7	Halsen IF (R)	12	1	0	11	10	42	−32	2	Relegation

(R) Relegated

=== District V, Group A ===
Pos	Team	Pld	W	D	L	GF	GA	GD	Pts	Qualification or relegation
1	FK Vigør	10	8	2	0	34	9	+25	18	Qualification for the championship play-offs preliminary round
2	Flekkefjord FK	10	7	1	2	38	12	+26	15	
3	IK Grane	10	5	2	3	24	15	+9	12	
4	IK Start	10	4	2	4	18	21	−3	10	
5	FK Donn	10	1	1	8	6	25	−19	3	
6	Kragerø TF (R)	10	1	0	9	10	48	−38	2	Relegation

(R) Relegated

=== District V, Group B ===
Pos	Team	Pld	W	D	L	GF	GA	GD	Pts	Qualification or relegation
1	Viking FK	12	9	0	3	37	13	+24	18	Qualification for the championship play-offs preliminary round
2	Stavanger IF	12	9	0	3	31	13	+18	18	
3	SK Jarl	12	8	0	4	35	25	+10	16	
4	SK Vard	12	5	2	5	15	20	−5	12	
5	Ulf-Sandnes	12	5	1	6	28	26	+2	11	
6	BK Brodd	12	1	4	7	16	32	−16	6	
7	SK Djerv 1919 (R)	12	1	1	10	12	45	−33	3	Relegation

(R) Relegated

=== District VI ===
Pos	Team	Pld	W	D	L	GF	GA	GD	Pts	Qualification or relegation
1	SK Djerv	10	10	0	0	46	16	+30	20	Qualification for the championship play-offs quarter-final
2	SK Brann	10	5	2	3	31	21	+10	12	
3	SK Hardy	10	4	2	4	30	25	+5	10	
4	Årstad IL	10	3	1	6	20	31	−11	7	
5	SK Viggo	10	2	3	5	16	29	−13	7	
6	Minde IL (R)	10	2	0	8	19	40	−21	4	Relegation

(R) Relegated

=== District VII ===
Pos	Team	Pld	W	D	L	GF	GA	GD	Pts	Qualification or relegation
1	Kristiansund FK	10	8	1	1	46	17	+29	17	Qualification for the championship play-offs quarter-final
2	Aalesunds FK	10	5	1	4	23	17	+6	11	
3	SPK Rollon	10	4	1	5	21	26	−5	9	
4	IL Braatt	10	3	2	5	20	18	+2	8	
5	Clausenengen FK	10	3	2	5	18	30	−12	8	
6	Veblungsnes FK (R)	10	3	1	6	17	37	−20	7	Relegation

(R) Relegated

=== District VIII ===
Pos	Team	Pld	W	D	L	GF	GA	GD	Pts	Qualification or relegation
1	Neset FK	12	8	3	1	38	15	+23	19	Qualification for the championship play-offs quarter-final
2	Ranheim IL	12	8	3	1	28	14	+14	19	
3	Steinkjer FK	12	5	5	2	34	23	+11	15	
4	SK Brage	12	5	1	6	25	24	+1	11	
5	National	12	3	2	7	28	35	−7	8	
6	Rosenborg BK	12	4	0	8	22	37	−15	8	
7	Orkanger IF (R)	12	1	2	9	21	48	−27	4	Relegation

(R) Relegated

== Championship play-offs ==
=== Preliminary round ===
Team 1	Agg.	Team 2	1st leg	2nd leg
Odds BK	1–2	IF Fram	0–1	1–1
Viking FK	3–0	FK Vigør	3–0	0–0
Mjøndalen IF	1–2	SFK Lyn	1–2	0–0

=== Quarter-finals ===
Team 1	Agg.	Team 2	1st leg	2nd leg
Fredrikstad FK	4–1	IF Fram	1–0	3–1
SFK Lyn	7–3	SK Gjøvik-Lyn	5–1	2–2
Viking FK	6–6	SK Djerv^{1}	6–2	0–4
Kristiansund FK	7–2	Neset FK	2–0	5–2

- ^{1}SK Djerv won on toss of coin.

=== Semi-finals ===
Team 1	Score	Team 2
SK Djerv	2–3	SFK Lyn
Fredrikstad FK	3–2	Kristiansund FK

=== Final ===
Team 1	Score	Team 2	Replay
SFK Lyn	0–0 (aet)	Fredrikstad FK	0–4
