= 1947–48 League of Norway =

4th season of top-tier football league in Norway

Norgesserien
- Season: 1947–48
- Champions: Freidig; 1st title
- Relegated: 58 teams

The 1947–48 Norgesserien was the 4th completed season of top division football in Norway.

Due to restructuring of the league system, 58 of the 74 teams were relegated at the end of the season.

SK Freidig won the championship after a 2–1 win against IL Sparta in the championship final.

== League tables ==
=== District I ===
Pos	Team	Pld	W	D	L	GF	GA	GD	Pts	Qualification or relegation
1	IL Sparta	12	9	1	2	34	14	+20	19	Qualification for the championship play-offs quarter-final
2	Fredrikstad FK	12	8	2	2	51	20	+31	18	
3	Sarpsborg FK	12	6	2	4	26	15	+11	14	
4	Lisleby FK (R)	12	5	2	5	22	23	−1	12	Qualification for the relegation play-offs
5	Selbak TIF (R)	12	5	2	5	16	23	−7	12	Relegation
6	SK Sprint (R)	12	2	1	9	13	40	−27	5	Relegation
7	SK Rapid (R)	12	1	2	9	9	36	−27	4	Relegation

Source: rsssf.no
(R) Relegated

=== District II, Group A ===
Pos	Team	Pld	W	D	L	GF	GA	GD	Pts	Qualification or relegation
1	Vålerengen	12	8	2	2	30	20	+10	18	Qualification for the championship play-offs preliminary round
2	Skeid	12	8	1	3	37	14	+23	17	
3	Birkebeineren (R)	12	4	4	4	19	21	−2	12	Qualification for the relegation play-offs preliminary round
4	Drafn (R)	12	3	4	5	24	22	+2	10	Relegation
5	Nydalen (R)	12	3	4	5	17	31	−14	10	Relegation
6	Strong (R)	12	3	3	6	16	31	−15	9	Relegation
7	Geithus (R)	12	4	0	8	22	26	−4	8	Relegation

Source: rsssf.no
(R) Relegated

=== District II, Group B ===
Pos	Team	Pld	W	D	L	GF	GA	GD	Pts	Qualification or relegation
1	Mjøndalen IF	12	11	0	1	32	7	+25	22	Qualification for the championship play-offs preliminary round
2	SFK Lyn	12	9	0	3	40	12	+28	18	
3	Sandaker SFK (O)	12	8	1	3	35	13	+22	17	Qualification for the relegation play-offs preliminary round
4	Drammens BK (R)	12	6	0	6	20	25	−5	12	Relegation
5	Frigg Oslo FK (R)	12	5	1	6	21	15	+6	11	Relegation
6	Kongsberg IF (R)	12	2	0	10	13	45	−32	4	Relegation
7	Slemmestad IF (R)	12	0	0	12	8	52	−44	0	Relegation

Source: rsssf.no
(O) Play-off winners; (R) Relegated

=== District III ===
Pos	Team	Pld	W	D	L	GF	GA	GD	Pts	Qualification or relegation
1	Kapp IL (R)	12	7	2	3	26	18	+8	16	Championship play-offs quarter-final and relegation play-offs
2	Raufoss IL (R)	12	6	1	5	32	23	+9	13	Relegation
3	SK Gjøvik-Lyn (R)	12	6	1	5	24	20	+4	13	Relegation
4	Fremad (R)	12	4	4	4	18	17	+1	12	Relegation
5	Hamar IL (R)	12	5	1	6	20	21	−1	11	Relegation
6	Hamarkameratene (R)	12	4	2	6	21	27	−6	10	Relegation
7	SK Mesna (R)	12	2	5	5	16	31	−15	9	Relegation

Source: rsssf.no
(R) Relegated

=== District IV, Group A ===
Pos	Team	Pld	W	D	L	GF	GA	GD	Pts	Qualification or relegation
1	Storms BK	12	9	2	1	27	13	+14	20	Qualification for the championship play-offs preliminary round
2	Sandefjord BK	12	7	4	1	32	14	+18	18	
3	IF Skiens Grane (R)	12	6	2	4	19	22	−3	14	Relegation
4	IF Urædd (R)	12	4	2	6	25	24	+1	10	Relegation
5	SK Snøgg (R)	12	2	6	4	17	26	−9	10	Relegation
6	IF Borg (R)	12	4	1	7	13	18	−5	9	Relegation
7	IF Fram (R)	12	0	3	9	8	24	−16	3	Relegation

Source: rsssf.no
(R) Relegated

=== District IV, Group B ===
Pos	Team	Pld	W	D	L	GF	GA	GD	Pts	Qualification or relegation
1	Ørn FK	12	8	1	3	33	21	+12	17	Qualification for the championship play-offs preliminary round
2	IF Pors	12	7	1	4	24	14	+10	15	
3	Larvik Turn & IF (R)	12	7	1	4	20	12	+8	15	Relegation
4	Odds BK (R)	12	6	2	4	20	17	+3	14	Relegation
5	Ulefoss SF (R)	12	3	4	5	19	23	−4	10	Relegation
6	Skiens BK (R)	12	2	3	7	6	24	−18	7	Relegation
7	Tønsbergs TF (R)	12	2	2	8	16	27	−11	6	Relegation

Source: rsssf.no
(R) Relegated

=== District V, Group A ===
Pos	Team	Pld	W	D	L	GF	GA	GD	Pts	Qualification or relegation
1	FK Donn (R)	10	5	4	1	15	8	+7	14	Championship play-offs preliminary round and relegation play-offs
2	IK Grane (R)	10	6	1	3	18	10	+8	13	Relegation
3	IK Start (R)	10	3	4	3	13	11	+2	10	Relegation
4	FK Vigør (R)	10	4	2	4	11	14	−3	10	Relegation
5	Flekkefjord FK (R)	10	4	1	5	18	15	+3	9	Relegation
6	FK Mandalskameratene (R)	10	1	2	7	10	27	−17	4	Relegation

Source: rsssf.no
(R) Relegated

=== District V, Group B ===
Pos	Team	Pld	W	D	L	GF	GA	GD	Pts	Qualification or relegation
1	Viking FK	12	9	1	2	29	8	+21	19	Qualification for the championship play-offs preliminary round
2	Ålgård FK (O)	12	8	0	4	21	12	+9	16	Qualification for the relegation play-offs
3	SK Jarl (R)	12	6	2	4	17	13	+4	14	Relegation
4	Stavanger IF (R)	12	5	2	5	14	18	−4	12	Relegation
5	Djerv 1919 (R)	12	4	2	6	12	22	−10	10	Relegation
6	SK Vard (R)	12	2	3	7	11	20	−9	7	Relegation
7	IL Brodd (R)	12	3	0	9	14	25	−11	6	Relegation

Source: rsssf.no
(O) Play-off winners; (R) Relegated

=== District VI ===
Pos	Team	Pld	W	D	L	GF	GA	GD	Pts	Qualification or relegation
1	SK Brann	10	9	1	0	38	5	+33	19	Qualification for the championship play-offs quarter-final
2	SK Hardy (R)	10	6	1	3	18	18	0	13	Qualification for the relegation play-offs
3	Årstad IL (R)	10	4	3	3	21	15	+6	11	Relegation
4	SK Djerv (R)	10	3	3	4	18	25	−7	9	Relegation
5	FBK Voss (R)	10	2	2	6	10	22	−12	6	Relegation
6	Nymark IL (R)	10	0	2	8	6	26	−20	2	Relegation

Source: rsssf.no
(R) Relegated

=== District VII ===
Pos	Team	Pld	W	D	L	GF	GA	GD	Pts	Qualification or relegation
1	Kristiansund FK (R)	10	8	1	1	30	6	+24	17	Championship play-offs quarter-final and relegation play-offs
2	Aalesunds FK (R)	10	5	1	4	24	14	+10	11	Relegation
3	Molde FK (R)	10	5	1	4	16	13	+3	11	Relegation
4	Clausenengen FK (R)	10	5	0	5	16	20	−4	10	Relegation
5	SPK Rollon (R)	10	4	0	6	18	25	−7	8	Relegation
6	IL Nordlandet (R)	10	1	1	8	3	29	−26	3	Relegation

Source: rsssf.no
(R) Relegated

=== District VIII ===
Pos	Team	Pld	W	D	L	GF	GA	GD	Pts	Qualification or relegation
1	SK Freidig (C)	12	6	4	2	31	14	+17	16	Qualification for the championship play-offs quarter-final
2	Ranheim IL (R)	12	6	4	2	15	10	+5	16	Qualification for the relegation play-offs
3	FK Kvik (R)	12	6	3	3	26	13	+13	15	Relegation
4	SK Falken (R)	12	3	6	3	21	21	0	12	Relegation
5	SK Brage (R)	12	4	4	4	19	20	−1	12	Relegation
6	Neset FK (R)	12	4	2	6	18	22	−4	10	Relegation
7	SK Nessegutten (R)	12	0	3	9	11	41	−30	3	Relegation

Source: rsssf.no
(C) Champions; (R) Relegated

== Championship play-offs ==
=== Preliminary round ===
Team 1	Agg.	Team 2	1st leg	2nd leg
Vålerengens IF	2–4	Mjøndalen IF	0–2	2–2
Storm	4–1	Ørn	2–1	2–0
Viking FK	6–3	FK Donn	2–1	4–2

=== Quarter-finals ===
Team 1	Agg.	Team 2	1st leg	2nd leg	Replay
Mjøndalen IF	1–0	Storms BK	0–0	1–0	—
Kapp IL	4–7	IL Sparta	2–3	2–4	—
Viking FK	5–0	SK Brann	2–0	3–0	—
SK Freidig	5–5	Kristiansund FK	4–1	1–4	Freidig won on w/o

=== Semi-finals ===
Team 1	Score	Team 2	Replay
IL Sparta	2–0	Mjøndalen IF	—
Viking FK	2–2	SK Freidig	1–2

=== Final ===
Team 1	Score	Team 2
SK Freidig	2–1	IL Sparta

== Relegation play-offs ==
=== Preliminary round ===
Team 1	Agg.	Team 2	1st leg	2nd leg
IF Birkebeineren	2–3	Sandaker SFK	2–1	0–2

=== Group 1 ===
Pos	Team	Pld	W	D	L	GF	GA	GD	Pts	Relegation
1	Ålgård FK (O)	3	2	0	1	10	2	+8	4	
2	Lisleby FK (R)	3	2	0	1	6	2	+4	4	Relegation
3	SK Hardy (R)	3	1	0	2	3	4	−1	2	Relegation
4	FK Donn (R)	3	1	0	2	1	10	−9	2	Relegation

Source: rsssf.no
(O) Play-off winners; (R) Relegated

=== Group 2 ===
Pos	Team	Pld	W	D	L	GF	GA	GD	Pts	Relegation
1	Sandaker SFK (O)	3	3	0	0	9	2	+7	6	
2	Ranheim IL (R)	3	2	0	1	10	5	+5	4	Relegation
3	Kristiansund FK (R)	3	1	0	2	3	6	−3	2	Relegation
4	Kapp IL (R)	3	0	0	3	5	14	−9	0	Relegation

Source: rsssf.no
(O) Play-off winners; (R) Relegated
