= Eliteserien =

First division football league in Norway

- Founded: 1937; 89 years ago 1937–1948 (as Norgesserien); 1948–1962 (as Hovedserien); 1963–1989 (as 1. divisjon); 1990–2016 (as Tippeligaen); 2017–present (as Eliteserien)
- Country: Norway
- Confederation: UEFA
- Number of clubs: 16
- Level on pyramid: 1
- Relegation to: Norwegian First Division
- Domestic cup: Norwegian Cup
- International cup(s): UEFA Champions League; UEFA Europa League; UEFA Conference League
- Current champions: Viking (9th title) (2025)
- Most championships: Rosenborg (26 titles)
- Most appearances: Daniel Berg Hestad (473)
- Top scorer: Sigurd Rushfeldt (172 goals)
- Broadcasters: TV 2 Eleven Sports
- Website: Eliteserien; NFF; Norsk Toppfotball
- Current: 2026 Eliteserien

Eliteserien (Norwegian pronunciation: [ɛˈlîːtəˌseːrɪən]) is a professional association football league in Norway and the highest level of the Norwegian football league system. Contested by 16 clubs, it operates on a system of promotion and relegation with the Norwegian First Division.

Seasons run from March to November with each team playing 30 matches (playing each other home and away). Most games are played on Sunday evenings.

Eliteserien was founded in 1937 as Norgesserien (lit. 'The League of Norway'), and the first season was the 1937–38 season. The structure and name of Eliteserien, along with Norway's other football leagues, has undergone frequent changes. The top level was renamed Hovedserien in 1948, 1. divisjon (now used by the second-level league in Norway) in 1963, then Tippeligaen (named for the main sponsor) in 1990. Starting with the 2017 season the league adopted the current Eliteserien, after NFF decided to totally drop any sponsor's names from the name of the league. TV 2 have been the owners of the broadcasting rights since 2023. The league generates NOK 400 million per year in domestic television rights. The Norwegian top flight has been professional since 1992. In 1995, Tippeligaen was expanded to 14 teams, and in 2009 it was further expanded to 16 teams.

Seventeen clubs have won the title since the inception of the league in 1937: Rosenborg (26), Fredrikstad (9), Viking (9), Lillestrøm (5), Molde (5), Vålerenga (5), Bodø/Glimt (4), Brann (3), Larvik Turn (3), Lyn (2), Start (2), Strømsgodset (2), Fram Larvik (1), Freidig (1), Moss (1), Skeid (1) and Stabæk (1). In 2010, Rosenborg became, and still remain, the only club to complete an Eliteserien campaign without losing a single game. The record of most points in a season is 81 by Bodø/Glimt in 2020. Since its establishment as a one-group top flight in 1963, forty-eight clubs have competed in Eliteserien.

== History ==
=== Early years (1937–1948) ===
Before 1937, there was no national league competition in Norway; only regional leagues and the Norwegian Cup. Starting in 1937–38, the various regional leagues in Southern Norway were aligned into eight districts, with a championship playoff between the winners to crown a national champion. This competition was called Norgesserien (English: The League of Norway). In the early years, the top flight teams were divided into eleven groups from eight districts. The league champion was decided in either a knockout tournament or a final between the winners of these groups. Fredrikstad was the first champions of the league, winning the 1937–38 season. They won the two-legged final against Lyn 4–0 on aggregate. Fredrikstad defended their title in the 1938–39 season. From the 1937–38 season and until the beginning of World War II, the teams were divided into eight district groups. There were plans at the time to merge the district leagues into a national competition, but because of World War II, this process was delayed until after the war, although also the first post-war season in 1947–48 had eleven district-based groups.

=== Hovedserien (1948–1962) ===
In 1948, Hovedserien (English: The Main League) was created, consisting of the 16 top teams from the district leagues, who were placed into two groups of eight, with the group winners playing a two-legged final for the national championship at the end of the season. This format was in place from the 1948–49 season until 1960–61, when it was decided to merge the two groups into a single top division, and have the season follow the calendar year from 1963 onwards. The 1950s were dominated by Fredrikstad FK and Larvik Turn. Fredrikstad won their latest league title in 1960–61, which secured their ninth title out of sixteen possible. Larvik Turn won Hovedserien three times in four seasons from 1955–56. The 1961–62 season was played during 15 months. The teams from the two groups in the 1960–61 top division were put in one group consisting of 16 teams. The 1961–62 season became a transitional season, where the 16 top-flight teams were placed in a single group, playing a season that went on for 15 months and one half of its teams were relegated. Officially still known as Hovedserien, the 1961–62 season is often referred to as Maratonserien ("The Marathon League") due to its unusual length. The Maratonserien was won by Brann.

=== 1. divisjon (1963–1989) ===
In 1963, a single top division containing ten teams was introduced, and the league was renamed 1. divisjon (English: 1st Division). The first regular one-league season was played spring-autumn and was won by title defenders Brann in 1963. The league was expanded to 12 teams in 1972. Teams from Northern Norway were not allowed to gain promotion to the top division before 1972, when Mjølner became the first team from Northern Norway to play in the top flight, and until 1979 were subject to stricter promotion rules than teams from the rest of the country. Viking won the league four consecutive seasons beginning in 1972. Lillestrøm won back-to-back titles in 1976 and 1977. In 1979 teams from Northern Norway were given the same promotion rights as the rest of the country. In the beginning of the 1980s, Vålerengen were the dominant team, with title wins in 1981, 1983 and 1984.

=== Tippeligaen (1990–2016) ===
The former logo of the league, Tippeligaen, which it was known as from 1990 to 2016.

In 1990, the league was renamed Tippeligaen, when Norsk Tipping became the main sponsor of the league. When fans and media continued referring to the league as 1. divisjon, it was decided to let the second-level league of Norwegian football "inherit" the name 1. divisjon in 1991, to help Tippeligaen establish as a brand. Rosenborg of Trondheim won the first year the league bore the name Tippeligaen in 1990. Followed by a win by Viking of Stavanger in 1991. In 1992, Rosenborg started a run of 13 consecutive titles which lasted to the 2004 season. During the first years of Rosenborg's thirteen-year run, they won the league with substantial margins, only partly challenged by Bodø/Glimt, Molde, Lillestrøm and Brann. However, this was steadily narrowing down towards a dramatic finish in 2004, where the Trondheim team tied with Vålerenga of Oslo in game points and on goal difference, but finished ahead on number of goals scored. However, in 2005 the winning streak came to an end as Vålerenga clinched the title, one point ahead of Start of Kristiansand. Rosenborg was never in contention that season and would finish only 7th. In 2006, Rosenborg returned to the top of the league, coming back from 10 points behind Brann at the halfway point to clinch the title with a match to spare. Brann won the league in 2007, and Stabæk won their first-ever title in 2008. Rosenborg then returned for a two-year winning streak in 2009 and 2010. Molde's back-to-back titles in 2011 and 2012 makes it the only other club to win consecutive titles in the current format, and outside Rosenborg, the first team to do so since Vålerenga in 1983 and 1984.

=== Recent years (2017–present) ===
In 2016, it was decided to change from the sponsorship name Tippeligaen to the non-sponsorship name Eliteserien, effecting from the 2017 season. Rosenborg won the league four consecutive times from 2015 to 2018, before Molde ended their streak by winning the title in the 2019 season. Lillestrøm were relegated from the 2019 Eliteserien and ended their record spell with 45 consecutive top division seasons. Bodø/Glimt became the first team from Northern Norway to win the league by winning the title in the 2020 season with 81 points, an all-time record.

== Competition format ==
=== Competition ===
As of the 2025 season there are 16 clubs in the Eliteserien, seven of which are located in Eastern Norway, six are from Western Norway, two from Northern Norway and one is from Trøndelag.

During the course of a season, each club plays the others twice, home and away, for a total of 30 games for each club, and a total of 240 games in a season. The season starts in March and lasts until early November. Rounds played during the weekends are usually broken up into two games on Saturdays, five games on Sundays and one game on either Fridays or Mondays. For the final two rounds, all games start simultaneously so that no club may gain an unfair advantage by knowing the results of other games in advance of kicking off their own.

The 16 May round, which is played the day before Norway's Constitution Day, 17 May, is one of the most anticipated rounds of the season. It is often referred to as the "national day of football" and since it precedes a national holiday, games usually see higher attendance than other rounds.

Teams receive three points for a win and one point for a draw. No points are awarded for a loss. Teams are ranked by total points, then goal difference, goals scored, and then head-to-head records used to separate teams on equal points. At the end of each season, the club with the most points is crowned "League Winner". The title of "Norwegian Champions" is reserved for the winners of the Norwegian Football Cup. The two lowest placed teams are automatically relegated to the Norwegian First Division and the top two teams from the First Division take their place. The fourteenth placed team in Eliteserien is also in danger of being relegated and must enter play-offs against one team from the First Division to stay in the top flight.

=== Changes in competition format ===
From	To	Group(s)	Teams	Match-weeks	Season Start	Season End	Championship play-offs
1937–38		11	74	10–12	Autumn	Spring	Play-off with 11 teams
1938–39		11	75	10–14	Autumn	Spring	Play-off with 11 teams
1947–48		11	74	10–12	Autumn	Spring	Play-off with 8 teams
1948–49	1960–61	2	16	14	Autumn	Spring	Play-off final with 2 teams
1961–62		1	16	30	Summer	Next autumn	—
1963	1971	1	10	18	Spring	Autumn	—
1972	1994	1	12	22	Spring	Autumn	—
1995	2008	1	14	26	Spring	Autumn	—
2009	Present	1	16	30	Spring	Autumn	—

=== Eliteserien teams in international competition ===
Rosenborg (11 times) and Molde (once) are the only Norwegian clubs to participate in the UEFA Champions League group stage. Rosenborg reached the quarterfinal in the 1996–97 season. They were eliminated by runners-up Juventus with 1–3 on aggregate. In the 1968–69 season, Lyn lost the European Cup Winners' Cup quarterfinal against runners-up Barcelona with 4–5 on aggregate. Brann lost the quarterfinal against Liverpool in the 1996–97 UEFA Cup Winners' Cup and Vålerenga lost the quarterfinal against Chelsea in the 1998–99 UEFA Cup Winners' Cup with 2–6 on aggregate. Molde reached the round of 16 in both the 2020–21 UEFA Europa League and the 2023–24 UEFA Conference League against Granada and Club Brugge respectively. Bodø/Glimt reached the quarterfinal of the 2021-22 UEFA Conference League, where they were eliminated by Roma and the semifinal of the 2024–25 UEFA Europa League, where they were eliminated by Tottenham with 1–5 on aggregate.

== Clubs ==
=== Current members ===
Locations of the teams in the 2026 Eliteserien

The following sixteen clubs are competing in the Eliteserien during the 2026 season.

Club	Position in 2025	First season in top division	Seasons in top division	First season of current spell in top division	Top division titles	Last top division title
Aalesund	4th (1D)	1937–38	21	2026	0	n/a
Bodø/Glimt	2nd	1977 (Note: Northern Norwegian teams were not allowed to qualify for the top flight division before 1972.)	31	2018	4	2024
Brann	4th	1937–38	69	2023	3	2007
Fredrikstad	8th	1937–38	46	2024	9	1960–61
HamKam	11th	1939–40	28	2022	0	n/a
KFUM Oslo	12th	2024	3	2024	0	n/a
Kristiansund	13th	2017 (Note: Kristiansund BK is the result of a merger between Kristiansund FK and Clausenengen FK. These two clubs first participated in the Norwegian top flight in the 1937–38 season.)	9	2024	0	n/a
Lillestrøm	1st (1D)	1937–38	61	2026	5	1989
Molde	10th	1939–40	51	2008	5	2022
Rosenborg	7th	1937–38	64	1979	26	2018
Sandefjord	5th	2006 (Note: Sandefjord Fotball is the result of a merger between Sandefjord BK and IL Runar. Sandefjord BK first participated in the Norwegian top flight in the 1938–39 season.)	14	2020	0	n/a
Sarpsborg	9th	2011 (Note: Sarpsborg 08 is the result of a merger between Sarpsborg FK and FK Sparta Sarpsborg. These two clubs first participated in the Norwegian top flight in the 1937–38 and 1947–48 seasons, respectively.)	15	2013	0	n/a
Start	2nd (1D)	1937–38	44	2026	2	1980
Tromsø	3rd	1986	38	2021	0	n/a
Viking	1st	1937–38	77	2019	9	2025
Vålerenga	6th	1937–38	66	2025	5	2005

== List of champions ==
Below is a list of the gold, silver and bronze medalists in the Norwegian top flight since its beginning in 1937–38. (The Norwegian Cup has been played since 1902, and is still officially known as the Norwegian Championship, presented with "The King's Cup".) During 1937–1948 the name of the league was Norgesserien ("The League of Norway"), 1948–1962 Hovedserien ("The Main League"), 1963–1989 1. divisjon ("1st Division"), and from 1990 Tippeligaen (sponsored name) or Eliteserien ("The Elite League", a generic name).

From 1937 until 1948, the championship was decided through a playoff between the winners of the various regional leagues in Southern Norway. From 1948 until 1961, the 16-team league was divided into two groups, and decided by a final match between the group winners. Since then it has been a round-robin decided through a league table. Bronze finals were played in 1960 and 1961; before that no bronze medals were awarded. Note that clubs from Northern Norway (including Bodø/Glimt and Tromsø IL), allegedly due to travel distance, were not allowed in the top division until 1972, but a separate Northern Norwegian Cup was played. Furthermore, northern Norwegian teams had stricter promotion rules until 1979. The league did not play during the period 1940–1946 because of the World War II.

See below for a list of medalists by club.

=== Medalists by year ===
The following medals have been awarded:

Season	Gold	Silver	Bronze
Norgesserien (1937–1948)
1937–38	Fredrikstad (1)	Lyn	–
1938–39	Fredrikstad (2)	Skeid	–
1939–40	Abandoned because of World War II.		
1940–47	No League Championship.		
1947–48	Freidig (1)	Sparta	–
Hovedserien (1948–1962)
1948–49	Fredrikstad (3)	Vålerenga	–
1949–50	Fram Larvik (1)	Fredrikstad	–
1950–51	Fredrikstad (4)	Odd	–
1951–52	Fredrikstad (5)	Brann	–
1952–53	Larvik Turn (1)	Skeid	–
1953–54	Fredrikstad (6)	Skeid	–
1954–55	Larvik Turn (2)	Fredrikstad	–
1955–56	Larvik Turn (3)	Fredrikstad	–
1956–57	Fredrikstad (7)	Odd	–
1957–58	Viking (1)	Skeid	–
1958–59	Lillestrøm (1)	Fredrikstad	–
1959–60	Fredrikstad (8)	Lillestrøm	Eik-Tønsberg
1960–61	Fredrikstad (9)	Eik-Tønsberg	Vålerenga
1961–62	Brann (1)	Steinkjer	Fredrikstad
1. divisjon (1963–1989)
1963	Brann (2)	Lyn	Skeid
1964	Lyn (1)	Fredrikstad	Sarpsborg
1965	Vålerenga (1)	Lyn	Sarpsborg
1966	Skeid (1)	Fredrikstad	Lyn
1967	Rosenborg (1)	Skeid	Lyn
1968	Lyn (2)	Rosenborg	Viking
1969	Rosenborg (2)	Fredrikstad	Strømsgodset
1970	Strømsgodset (1)	Rosenborg	HamKam

Season	Gold	Silver	Bronze
1971	Rosenborg (3)	Lyn	Viking
1972	Viking (2)	Fredrikstad	Strømsgodset
1973^{1}	Viking (3)	Rosenborg	Start
1974	Viking (4)	Molde	Vålerenga
1975	Viking (5)	Brann	Start
1976	Lillestrøm (2)	Mjøndalen	Brann
1977	Lillestrøm (3)	Bodø/Glimt	Molde
1978	Start (1)	Lillestrøm	Viking
1979	Viking (6)	Moss	Start
1980	Start (2)	Bryne	Lillestrøm
1981	Vålerenga (2)	Viking	Rosenborg
1982	Viking (7)	Bryne	Lillestrøm
1983	Vålerenga (3)	Lillestrøm	Start
1984	Vålerenga (4)	Viking	Start
1985	Rosenborg (4)	Lillestrøm	Vålerenga
1986	Lillestrøm (4)	Mjøndalen	Kongsvinger
1987	Moss (1)	Molde	Kongsvinger
1988	Rosenborg (5)	Lillestrøm	Molde
1989	Lillestrøm (5)	Rosenborg	Tromsø
Tippeligaen (1990–2016)
1990	Rosenborg (6)	Tromsø	Molde
1991	Viking (8)	Rosenborg	Start
1992	Rosenborg (7)	Kongsvinger	Start
1993	Rosenborg (8)	Bodø/Glimt	Lillestrøm
1994	Rosenborg (9)	Lillestrøm	Viking
1995	Rosenborg (10)	Molde	Bodø/Glimt
1996	Rosenborg (11)	Lillestrøm	Viking
1997	Rosenborg (12)	Brann	Strømsgodset
1998	Rosenborg (13)	Molde	Stabæk
1999	Rosenborg (14)	Molde	Brann

Season	Gold	Silver	Bronze
2000	Rosenborg (15)	Brann	Viking
2001	Rosenborg (16)	Lillestrøm	Viking
2002	Rosenborg (17)	Molde	Lyn
2003	Rosenborg (18)	Bodø/Glimt	Stabæk
2004	Rosenborg (19)	Vålerenga	Brann
2005	Vålerenga (5)	Start	Lyn
2006	Rosenborg (20)	Brann	Vålerenga
2007	Brann (3)	Stabæk	Viking
2008	Stabæk (1)	Fredrikstad	Tromsø
2009	Rosenborg (21)	Molde	Stabæk
2010	Rosenborg (22)	Vålerenga	Tromsø
2011	Molde (1)	Tromsø	Rosenborg
2012	Molde (2)	Strømsgodset	Rosenborg
2013	Strømsgodset (2)	Rosenborg	Haugesund
2014	Molde (3)	Rosenborg	Odd
2015	Rosenborg (23)	Strømsgodset	Stabæk
2016	Rosenborg (24)	Brann	Odd
Eliteserien (2017–)
2017	Rosenborg (25)	Molde	Sarpsborg 08
2018	Rosenborg (26)	Molde	Brann
2019	Molde (4)	Bodø/Glimt	Rosenborg
2020	Bodø/Glimt (1)	Molde	Vålerenga
2021	Bodø/Glimt (2)	Molde	Viking
2022	Molde (5)	Bodø/Glimt	Rosenborg
2023	Bodø/Glimt (3)	Brann	Tromsø
2024	Bodø/Glimt (4)	Brann	Viking
2025	Viking (9)	Bodø/Glimt	Tromsø

Note: ^{1} First season when North Norwegian teams were allowed to play in the top division.

=== Medalists by club ===
Eliteserien title holders

The following clubs have won one or more Eliteserien medals since 1937–38:

Club	Founded	Gold	Silver	Bronze	Last merits
Rosenborg	1917–05–19	26	7	5	Bronze 2022
Fredrikstad	1903–04–07	9	9	1	Silver 2008
Viking	1899–08–10	9	2	10	Gold 2025
Molde	1911–06–19	5	11	3	Gold 2022
Lillestrøm	1917–04–02	5	8	3	Silver 2001
Vålerenga	1913–07–29	5	3	5	Bronze 2020
Bodø/Glimt	1916–09–19	4	5	1	Silver 2025
Brann	1908–09–26	3	8	4	Silver 2024
Larvik Turn	1906–01–15	3	–	–	Gold 1955–56
Lyn	1896–03–03	2	4	4	Bronze 2005
Strømsgodset	1907–02–10	2	2	3	Silver 2015
Start	1905–09–19	2	1	7	Silver 2005
Skeid	1915–01–01	1	5	1	Silver 1967
Stabæk	1912–03–16	1	1	4	Bronze 2015
Moss	1906–08–28	1	1	–	Gold 1987
Fram Larvik	1894–01–15	1	–	–	Gold 1949–50
Freidig	1903–10–13	1	–	–	Gold 1947–48
Tromsø	1920–09–15	–	2	5	Bronze 2025
Odd	1894–03–31	–	2	2	Bronze 2016
Bryne	1926–04–10	–	2	–	Silver 1982
Mjøndalen	1910–08–22	–	2	–	Silver 1986
Kongsvinger	1892–01–31	–	1	2	Silver 1992
Eik-Tønsberg	1928–03–14	–	1	1	Silver 1960–61
Sparta	1928–11–23	–	1	–	Silver 1947–48
Steinkjer	1910–05–29	–	1	–	Silver 1961–62
Sarpsborg	1903–05–08	–	–	2	Bronze 1965
HamKam	1918–08–10	–	–	1	Bronze 1970
Haugesund	1993–10–28	–	–	1	Bronze 2013
Sarpsborg 08	2008–01–15	–	–	1	Bronze 2017
TOTAL		74	74	60	

=== Honoured clubs ===
Clubs in European football are commonly honoured for winning multiple league titles and a representative golden star is sometimes placed above the club badge to indicate the club having won 10 league titles. In Norway the star symbolizes 10 Eliteserien titles. Rosenborg was the first team to introduce a star when they won their 10th title in 1995. No club has introduced a star since 2006, when Rosenborg won their 20th league title to put a second star on their badge. The clubs closest to their first are Fredrikstad and Viking with 9 Eliteserien titles each. The following table is ordered after number of stars followed by number of Eliteserien titles.

Statistics updated as of the end of the 2022 season

Club	Eliteserien titles	Stars	Introduced 1st star	Introduced 2nd star
Rosenborg	26		1995	2006

== Sponsorship ==
From 1990 to 2016, Eliteserien had title sponsorship rights sold to Norsk Tipping.

Period	Sponsor	Name
1937–1948	No sponsor	Norgesserien
1948–1962	No sponsor	Hovedserien
1963–1989	No sponsor	1. divisjon
1990–2016	Norsk Tipping	Tippeligaen
2017–	No sponsor	Eliteserien

Eliteserien has a number of official partners and suppliers. The first official ball supplier for the league is Select who on 27 October 2017 signed a three-year contract to deliver official balls. The deal began from the start of the 2018 season and was renewed ahead of the 2022 season.

== Broadcasters ==
The broadcasting rights were in December 2015 secured by Discovery Networks who signed a six-year deal giving them rights to broadcast all the 240 games in Eliteserien from 2017 to 2022. The deal was worth NOK 2.4 billion. In December 2020, TV 2 acquired the broadcasting rights from 2023 to 2028 in a deal worth NOK 4.5 billion.

All matches are broadcast internationally on Eleven Sports.

In the Balkans, the league is currently aired on Sport Klub.

In the United Kingdom and Ireland matches are aired live on OneFootball.

== Stadiums ==
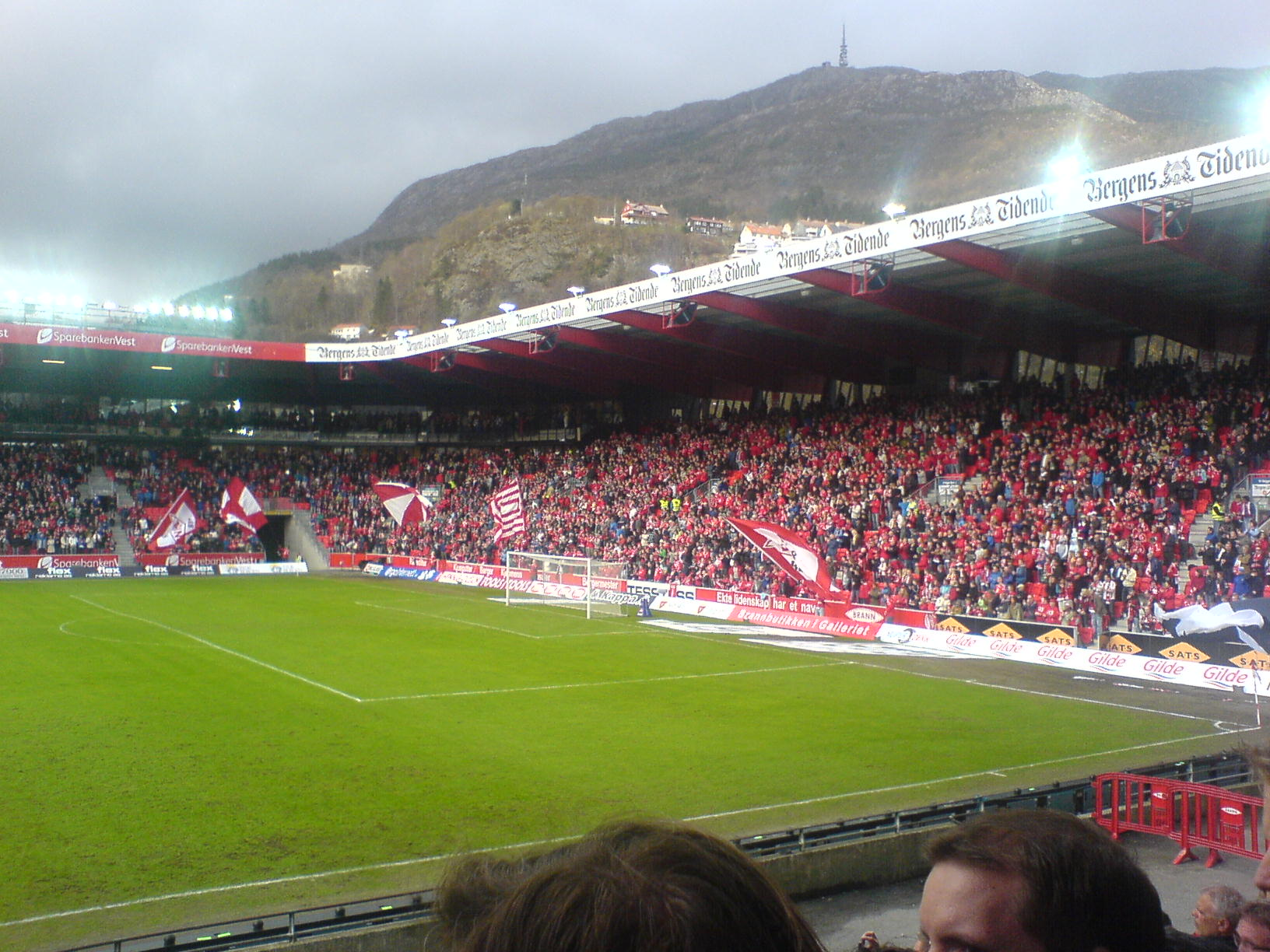
A 2007 match at Brann Stadion between Brann and Strømsgodset.

Since the competition format was changed to a one-group top flight in 1963, Eliteserien football has been played in 56 stadiums. As of the start of the 2020 season, Ullevaal Stadion has hosted the most matches in the top flight with 697. Since the opening of Vålerenga's new stadium Intility Arena in August 2017, no clubs in Eliteserien use Ullevaal Stadion as their home ground. Two stadiums that have seen Eliteserien football (1963–) have now been demolished.

The stadiums for the 2023 season show a large disparity in capacity: Lerkendal Stadion, the home of Rosenborg, has a capacity of 21,421 with Nadderud Stadion, the home of Stabek, having a capacity of 4,938. The combined total capacity of Eliteserien in the 2023 season is 175,938 with an average capacity of 10,996.

The Eliteserien's record average attendance was set during the 2007 season. This record attendance recorded an average attendance of 10,521 with a total attendance of just under 2 million. The 2 million mark was crossed after the 2009 league extension to sixteen teams. 2,151,219 was the total attendance in 2009, which is the record total attendance.

== Managers ==
Managers or head coaches in the Eliteserien are involved in the day-to-day running of the team, including the training, team selection, and player acquisition. Their influence varies from club-to-club and is related to the structure of the club and the relationship of the manager with fans. Managers are required to have a UEFA Pro Licence which is the final coaching qualification available, and follows the completion of the UEFA 'B' and 'A' Licences. The UEFA Pro Licence is required by every person who wishes to manage a club in the Eliteserien on a permanent basis.

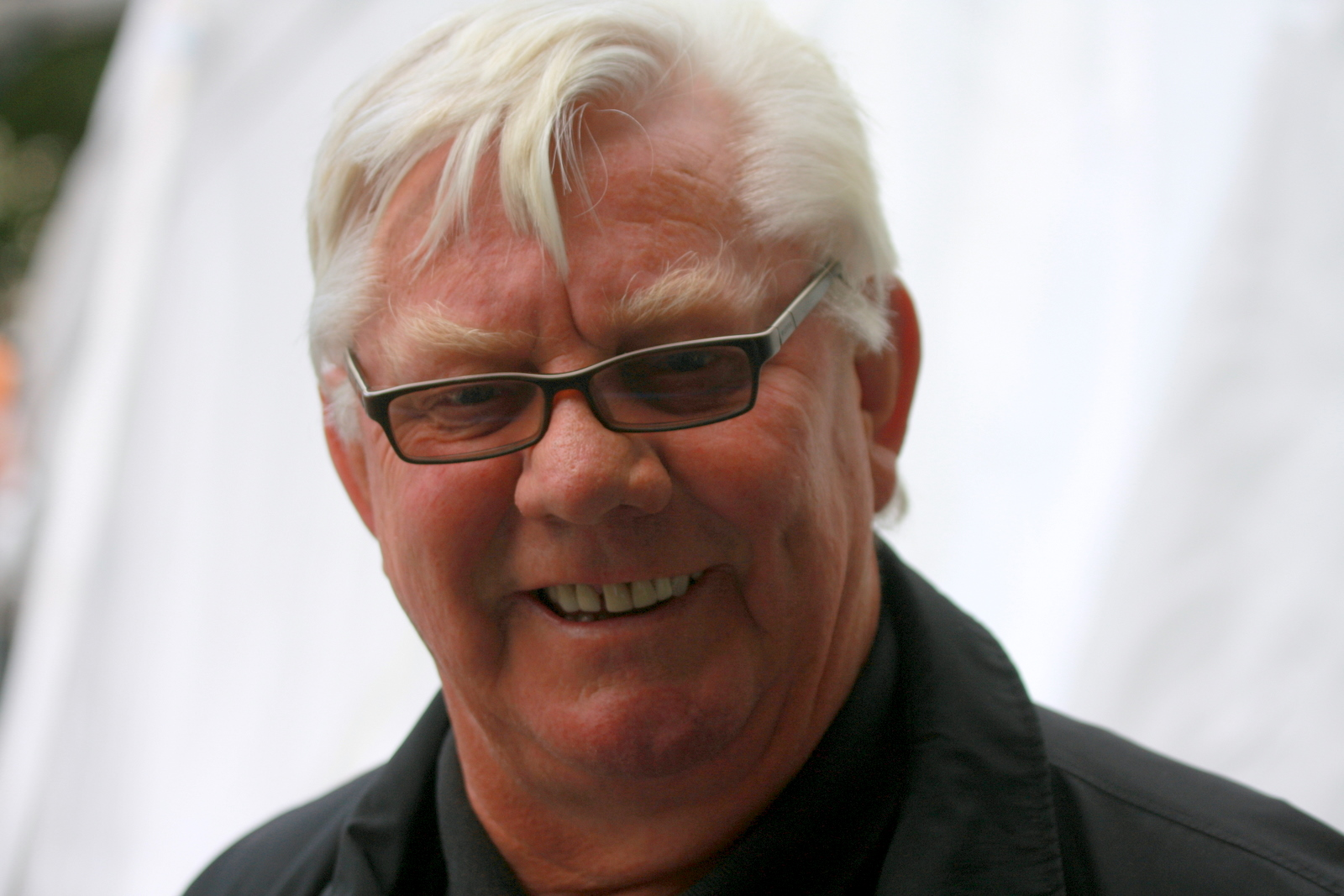
Former Rosenborg and Moss head coach Nils Arne Eggen was the most successful head coach or manager in the history of Eliteserien.

Managers with multiple league wins
Manager	Club(s)	Wins	Winning years
(Norway) Nils Arne Eggen	Rosenborg, Moss	15	1971, 1987, 1988, 1990, 1992, 1993, 1994, 1995, 1996, 1997, 1999, 2000, 2001, 2002, 2010
(Norway) Kjetil Knutsen	Bodø/Glimt	4	2020, 2021, 2023, 2024
(Norway) Kåre Ingebrigtsen	Rosenborg	4	2015, 2016, 2017, 2018
(Norway) Oddvar Hansen	Brann	2	1961–62, 1963
(Norway) Karsten Johannessen	Start	2	1978, 1980
(Norway) Kjell Schou-Andreassen	Viking	2	1972, 1982
(Sweden) Gunder Bengtsson	Vålerenga	2	1983, 1984
(Sweden) Erik Hamrén	Rosenborg	2	2009, 2010
(Norway) Ole Gunnar Solskjær	Molde	2	2011, 2012
(Norway) Erling Moe	Molde	2	2019, 2022

Current Eliteserien managers
Manager	Nationality	Club	Appointed	Time as manager
Kjetil Knutsen	Norway	Bodø/Glimt	17 November 2017	9 years, 4 days
Andreas Tegström	Sweden	Sandefjord	1 January 2021	5 years, 324 days
Morten Jensen	Norway	Viking	1 January 2021	5 years, 324 days
Bjarte Lunde Aarsheim	Norway	Viking	1 January 2021	5 years, 324 days
Johannes Moesgaard	Norway	KFUM Oslo	22 December 2022	3 years, 334 days
Geir Bakke	Norway	Vålerenga	12 July 2023	3 years, 132 days
Amund Skiri	Norway	Kristiansund	26 August 2023	3 years, 87 days
Alexander Tettey (Interim)	Norway	Rosenborg	5 May 2026	200 days
Jørgen Vik	Norway	Tromsø	8 January 2024	2 years, 317 days
Azar Karadas	Norway	Start	12 February 2024	2 years, 282 days
Kjetil Rekdal	Norway	Aalesund	30 June 2024	2 years, 144 days
Andreas Hagen	Norway	Fredrikstad	15 July 2024	2 years, 129 days
Hans Erik Ødegaard	Norway	Lillestrøm	1 January 2025	1 year, 324 days
Freyr Alexandersson	Iceland	Brann	13 January 2025	1 year, 312 days
Thomas Myhre	Norway	HamKam	24 June 2025	1 year, 150 days
Martin Falk (caretaker)	Norway	Molde	21 December 2025	335 days
Even Sel	Norway	Sarpsborg	22 December 2025	334 days

== Statistics ==
=== League ranking and European qualification ===
In the UEFA coefficient, UEFA's rankings of European leagues based on their performances in European competitions over a five-year period, the league ranked 14th place in 2025/2026 season because of improvements in the European cups. The league's highest ranking, tenth place, came in 1998. The winners of the previous calendar year's Eliteserien enter the second qualifying round of the UEFA Champions League, while the cup winners enter the second qualifying round of the Europa Conference League. The second and third placed teams also enters the second qualifying round of the Europa Conference League. In the 2013–2014 season, Norway also had an additional place in the first qualifying round of the Europa League due to its fair play ranking.

The following is a table indicating Norwegian league coefficient rankings compared to other UEFA leagues.

Year	Rank	Pts	Teams
1961	23rd	3.000	1
1962	24th	3.000	1
1963	26th	3.000	1
1964	28th	3.000	2
1965	24th	4.333	3
1966	28th	3.333	3
1967	28th	4.333	3
1968	25th	4.999	3
1969	25th	7.665	3
1970	26th	7.832	4
1971	26th	6.498	3
1972	25th	7.498	3
1973	26th	8.082	4
1974	25th	6.916	4
1975	27th	5.416	4
1976	25th	5.500	4

Year	Rank	Pts	Teams
1977	28th	4.000	4
1978	26th	5.750	4
1979	26th	6.250	4
1980	26th	6.500	4
1981	26th	7.083	3
1982	25th	7.583	3
1983	26th	6.249	3
1984	27th	5.249	3
1985	26th	5.999	3
1986	28th	5.666	3
1987	28th	5.999	3
1988	27th	6.666	3
1989	27th	6.666	3
1990	26th	5.999	3
1991	27th	5.999	3
1992	28th	4.999	3

Year	Rank	Pts	Teams
1993	29th	3.666	3
1994	22nd	8.332	3
1995	19th	12.332	3
1996	18th	15.832	4
1997	15th	22.249	4
1998	10th	27.449	5
1999	17th	19.733	5
2000	13th	22.100	5
2001	15th	23.600	4
2002	17th	21.475	4
2003	20th	19.575	5
2004	15th	21.900	4
2005	20th	20.200	4
2006	19th	20.975	5
2007	18th	19.725	5
2008	18th	22.425	5
2009	19th	18.800	5

Year	Rank	Pts	Teams
2010	22nd	17.400	5
2011	26th	14.375	4
2012	26th	14.675	5
2013	27th	14.175	5
2014	26th	14.275	5
2015	26th	14.375	5
2016	22nd	19.250	4
2017	25th	18.325	4
2018	29th	17.425	4
2019	23rd	20.200	4
2020	22nd	21.750	4
2021	22nd	21.000	4
2022	17th	27.250	4
2023	16th	29.000	4
2024	14th	31.625	4
2025	11th	39.687	4
2026	14th	41.237	5

Country ranking

UEFA association coefficients as of 31 July 2026:

- 12. Super League Greece (41.112)
- 13. (Denmark) Danish Superliga (35.181)
- 14. (Norway) Eliteserien (33.912)
- 16. (Cyprus) Cypriot First Division (32.818)
- 16. (Switzerland) Swiss Super League (28.200)

Club ranking

UEFA 5-year Club Ranking as of 31 July 2026:

- 36. Bodø/Glimt (52.000)
- 100. Molde (19.750)
- 125. Brann (14.250)
- 208. Viking (7.500)
- 225. Lillestrøm (6.782)
- 226. Tromsø (6.782)
- 227. Rosenborg (6.782)
- 228. Fredrikstad (6.782)

=== Attendance ===
From 1963 to 1971, the league consisted of ten teams (90 matches a year). Between 1972 and 1994, the league consisted of 12 teams (132 matches a year). The number was raised to 14 teams (182 matches a year) in 1995 and to 16 teams (240 matches a year) in 2009. Attendances reached peaks in 1963, 1968, 1977 and 2007, and were at their lowest in 1986.

The record for highest average home attendance for a club was set by Rosenborg in 2007 (19,903 over 13 home matches). 12 October 1985 saw the record for highest attendance at a match, with 28,569 in the game between Rosenborg and Lillestrøm at Lerkendal Stadion. The highest ever average attendance for Eliteserien as a whole was set in 2007 with 10,521.

Year	Total	Average
1963	708 368	7 871
1964	556 699	6 186
1965	453 044	5 034
1966	413 250	4 592
1967	562 472	6 250
1968	700 013	7 778
1969	683 120	7 590
1970	507 243	5 636
1971	592 031	6 578
1972	743 966	5 636
1973	737 863	5 590
1974	759 004	5 750
1975	893 874	6 772

Year	Total	Average
1976	856 428	6 488
1977	968 683	7 339
1978	730 419	5 533
1979	823 387	6 238
1980	671 176	5 085
1981	776 191	5 880
1982	603 036	4 569
1983	729 373	5 526
1984	568 765	4 309
1985	581 177	4 403
1986	426 349	3 229
1987	469 030	3 553
1988	576 257	4 365

Year	Total	Average
1989	624 679	4 732
1990	647 489	4 905
1991	706 508	5 352
1992	671 903	5 083
1993	731 565	5 542
1994	688 589	5 216
1995	841 717	4 624
1996	841 368	4 622
1997	772 197	4 242
1998	959 317	5 270
1999	983 630	5 404
2000	1 024 722	5 639
2001	1 013 264	5 567

Year	Total	Average
2002	1 092 359	6 002
2003	1 198 798	6 587
2004	1 458 258	8 012
2005	1 727 101	9 489
2006	1 655 572	9 097
2007	1 914 907	10 521
2008	1 785 815	9 812
2009	2 151 219	8 956
2010	1 947 236	8 117
2011	1 919 325	7 994
2012	1 680 822	7 003
2013	1 637 716	6 824
2014	1 670 706	6 961

Year	Total	Average
2015	1 610 684	6 711
2016	1 669 435	6 985
2017	1 607 772	6 699
2018	1 407 693	5 865
2019	1 379 861	5 773
2020	70 837	297*
2021	755 013	3 240*
2022	1 371 235	5 713
2023	1 737 332	7 239
2024	1 618 873	6 745
2025	1 693 995	7 088

- = Restricted due to COVID-19.

== Players ==
=== Individual records ===
==== Most appearances ====
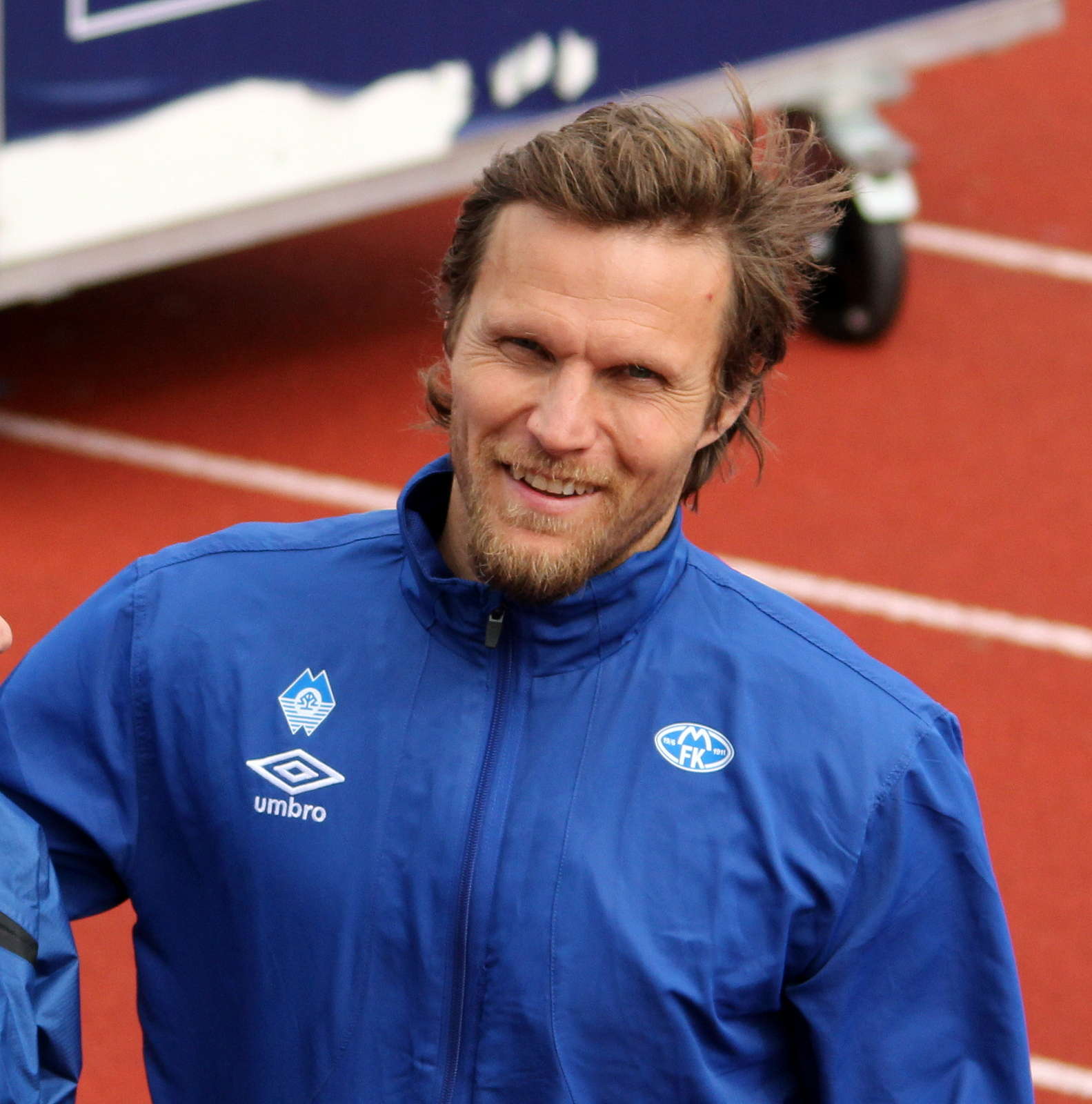
Daniel Berg Hestad is the player with most appearances.

As of 21 November 2026

Number	Player	Years	Matches
1	(Norway) Daniel Berg Hestad	1993–2016	473
2	(Norway) Steffen Hagen	2004–2024	462
3	(Norway) Morten Berre	1996–2015	452
4	(Norway) Frode Kippe	1997–2019	441
5	(Norway) Roar Strand	1989–2010	439
6	(Norway) Lars-Christopher Vilsvik	2010–2025	421
7	(Norway) Øyvind Storflor	1999–2019	421
8	(Norway) Erling Knudtzon	2007–2024	420
9	(Norway) Espen Hoff	1999–2016	406
10	(Norway) Ruben Yttergård Jenssen	2005–2013, 2018–	377

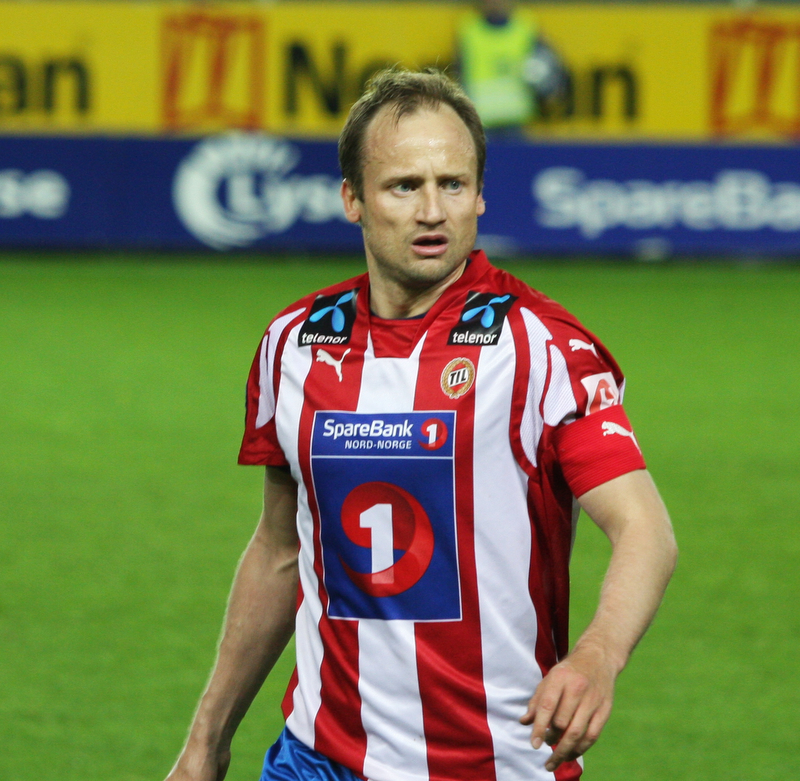
Sigurd Rushfeldt is the league's top scorer.

==== Most goals scored ====
As of Start of the 2026 season

Number	Player	Years	Goals	Matches	Average
1	(Norway) Sigurd Rushfeldt	1992–2011	172	299	0.58
2	(Norway) Harald Martin Brattbakk	1990–2005	166	255	0.65
3	(Norway) Petter Belsvik	1989–2003	159	292	0.54
4	(Norway) Odd Iversen	1967–1982	158	225	0.70
5	(Norway) Per Kristoffersen	1956–1968	145	194	0.75
6	(Norway) Frode Johnsen	1999–2015	132	301	0.45
7	(Norway) Thorstein Helstad	1995–2013	116	234	0.50
7	(Norway) Bengt Sæternes	1996–2011	116	280	0.41
9	(Norway) Jostein Flo	1987–2001	114	213	0.54
10	(Norway) Arild Sundgot	1995–2011	111	325	0.34

== Awards ==
=== Trophy ===
The winners of Eliteserien win two trophies. One small trophy in silver which they keep and one bigger trophy which are held only by reigning champions. The big trophy was introduced in 2012 and all winners from 2012 and onwards will get its club's name engraved on it. The ribbons that drape the handles are presented in the team colours of the league champions that year.

== See also ==
- Toppserien (Women's top division)
- Norwegian football top scorers
- List of football clubs in Norway
- List of Eliteserien Champions from 1938 to present time
