= Lovisenlund =

Multi-purpose stadium in Larvik, Norway

- Interactive map of Lovisenlund
- Full name: Lovisenlund idrettsplass
- Location: Larvik, Vestfold, Norway
- Coordinates: 59.0605°N 10.0289°E
- Surface: grass

Tenants
- Larvik Turn (football, athletics)

Lovisenlund is a multi-purpose stadium in the town of Larvik in Larvik Municipality in Vestfold county, Norway.

It is the home ground of Larvik Turn. The record attendance is about 17,000, from a 1956 match between Larvik Turn and Fredrikstad FK. It was used for the Norwegian football cup final of 1931, when Odd played Mjøndalen IF. The venue hosted the Norwegian Athletics Championships in 1979.
