= William Eriksen =

Norwegian footballer (1909-1999)

Personal information
- Date of birth: 4 February 1909
- Place of birth: Skien, Norway
- Date of death: 10 March 1999 (aged 90)
- Position: Forward

International career
Years	Team	Apps	(Gls)
1932	Norway	1	(0)

William Eriksen (4 February 1909 – 10 March 1999) was a Norwegian footballer. He played in one match for the Norway national football team in 1932.
