= IF Borg =

Norwegian football club

- Full name: Idrettsforeningen Borg
- Founded: 29 May 1914
- Ground: Borg idrettsanlegg, Skien
- League: Fifth Division
- 2025: 1st, Sixth Div.

Idrettsforeningen Borg is a Norwegian multi-sports club from Borgestad, Skien. The club has sections for association football, team handball and gymnastics.

The club was founded as Idrætsforeningen Borg on 29 May 1914, then in Gjerpen Municipality. The team colours are brown and white.

The men's football team played on the first tier in Norway around World War II, starting in the 1937–38 League of Norway. Finishing third in their group behind Odd and Urædd, the team escaped relegation by 2 points (one victory) in 1938–39, before finding themselves in last place in 1939–40 League of Norway with only losses. However, the league was abandoned because of World War II, and did not resume until 1947. In the 1947–48 League of Norway, then, Borg got a new chance to survive on the first tier, but did not, as they finished second to last. In the 1948–49 season, the team won its group on the second tier. It reached the playoff for promotion to the first tier, but did not advance.

The men's football team currently plays in the Fifth Division, the sixth tier of football in Norway, having won their Sixth Division group in 2025.
