= IF Skiens Grane =

Norwegian football club

- Full name: Idrettsforeningen Skiens Grane
- Founded: 25 March 1911
- Ground: Granebanen, Skien
- League: Fifth Division
- 2025: 6th

Idrettsforeningen Skiens Grane is a Norwegian association football club from west central Skien.

The club was founded as Grane-Skiens FK on 25 March 1911. Being a multi-sports club at the time, it also had sections for team handball, Nordic skiing and athletics. The team colours are yellow and blue.

The men's football team played on the first tier in Norway around World War II, winning promotion to the League of Norway in 1938. The team finished third in their group in 1938–39, behind Ørn Horten and Fram Larvik, repeating the same placement in 1939–40. However, the league was abandoned because of World War II, and did not resume until 1947. In the 1947–48 League of Norway, the competition would be significantly tightened, and despite Skiens Grane finishing in third place again, they were relegated. In the 1948–49 season, the team finished second in its group on the second tier, behind Fram, and was ineligibl for promotion.

The team also reached the third round of the cup in 1940, 1948 and 1952.

The men's football team currently plays in the Fifth Division, the sixth tier of football in Norway.
