= Tistedalens TIF =

Norwegian sports club

- Full name: Tistedalens Turn- og Idrettsforening
- Founded: 22 May 1916
- Ground: Tistedalen kunstgress, Tistedalen
- League: 4. divisjon
- 2019: 2nd (5. divisjon)

Tistedalens Turn- og Idrettsforening is a Norwegian multi-sports club from Tistedalen, Halden, Østfold. It has sections for association football and team handball.

The club was founded on 22 May 1916 as Tistedalens IF adding the T for Turn later that year when it resumed the gymnastics activity of the defunct Tistedalens TF. It had sections for football and Nordic skiing from the start, and later added sections for athletics, orienteering and bandy which later became defunct. In athletics, the club arranged the Norwegian cross-country running championships, long course, in 1961.

The men's football team plays in the 4. divisjon, the fifth tier of Norwegian football, being promoted from the 2019 5. divisjon. It formerly had spells in the 3. divisjon in 1994, 1995, 2001 and 2003. Before the Second World War II, the club even contested the 1938–39 League of Norway.
