= Vikersund IF =

Norwegian football club

- Full name: Vikersund Idrettsforening
- Founded: 11 May 1911
- Ground: Vikersund stadion, Vikersund
- League: Sixth Division
- 2025: 5th

Vikersund Idrettsforening is a Norwegian multi-sports club from Vikersund, Modum. It has sections for association football, team handball, volleyball, Nordic skiing, alpine skiing and disc golf.

The club was founded on 11 May 1911 as Vikersund og Omegn IF. During its first decades, the club also had sections for speed skating, bandy and orienteering which were later discontinued. The club colours were black with white shorts, later changed to red with black shorts or all-red.

Internationally, Vikersund IF is best known for its ski flying hill Vikersundbakken, the arena for several ski jumping world records. The hill has hosted the FIS Ski Jumping World Cup and FIS Ski Flying World Championships several times, in addition to the first ever ski flying race for women in March 2023. Among the ski jumpers who represented Vikersund IF is Ole Gunnar Fidjestøl.

Before World War II, the men's football team won promotion to the highest Norwegian league in 1939. In the 1939–40 League of Norway, the team was situated last in their group; however the league was abandoned due to the war. After the war, the club did reach the third round of the cup.

In more recent times, the men's football team reached the first round of the cup in 1980 and 1985. The team then played in the Third Division, the fourth tier, in 1994 and 1995. After the 2007 season, Vikersund IF cooperated with other local teams to form Modum FK, though Modum FK was formally a continuation of another of the merging clubs, Åmot IF. Vikersund IF leader Odd Flattum was president of the Football Association of Norway. Vegard Hansen played for the club.

The men's football team currently plays in the Sixth Division, the seventh tier of football in Norway. The women's team currently plays in the Fifth Division, though as a cooperation team with Moingen and Åmot.
