= Skiens BK =

Norwegian handball club

Skiens Ballklubb
- Full name: Skiens Ballklubb
- Sport: Team handball; association football; Nordic skiing
- Founded: 31 August 1921
- Home ground: Skien, Norway
- Colours: Green and white

Skiens Ballklubb is a Norwegian team handball club from central Skien.

The club was founded as a merger of the local clubs Snøgg and Ulf on 31 August 1921. Being a multi-sports club at the time, it also had sections for association football (joining the Football Association in 1924) and Nordic skiing at the time. The team colours are green and white.

The men's handball team played in the highest Norwegian league from the 1980s. Both the men's and women's teams currently play in the Fourth Division. Former players include Kjerstin Andersen, Terje Andersen and Gunnar Pettersen.

The men's football team played on the first tier in Norway around World War II. It was a part of the inaugural League of Norway, placing around the middle of their group in both 1937–38, 1938–39 and 1939–40. However, the latter season was abandoned because of World War II, and did not resume until 1947. In the 1947–48 League of Norway, Skiens BK finished second to last and were relegated. The team later reached third round of the cup in 1951.
