= SK Hardy =

Norwegian sports club

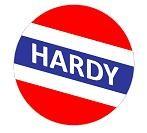
- Full name: Sportsklubben Hardy
- Founded: 10 October 1915; 109 years ago
- Dissolved: 1995
Home colours	Away colours

Sportsklubben Hardy was a multi-sports club from Bergen, Norway. The club had sections for athletics, football, handball, skiing and speed skating. The football team played top division league football from 1937 to 1948.

During a period in the 1930s, Hardy was considered to be the best team from Bergen. They won the Bergen league championship (in Norwegian: Kretsserien) in 1933 and 1936. In 1935, they reached the semi-finals of the Norwegian Cup where they lost 3–0 against Fredrikstad at Brann Stadion in a game attended by 17,000 spectators.

Two of Norway's bronze medal-winning players from the 1936 Summer Olympics, Odd Frantzen and Magdalon Monsen, represented Hardy at the time. In addition, Birger Pedersen and Godfred Bysheim also represented Norway in the same year.

Hardy played in the inaugural season of the national league top division; the 1937–38 Norgesserien, where they finished in third place in their district group. In the following 1938–39 season, Hardy won their District VI group and qualified for the championship play-offs. They reached the semi-finals where they were eliminated by Fredrikstad in a second replay after two draws. In 1947–48 the first post-war season, Hardy were among the 58 teams that relegated from the top division due to restructuring of the league system.

Hardy originated from the Nygård neighbourhood, but due to lack of recruitment, the club decided to move to Mannsverk in the late 1960s. This led to an increase of youth players. Club activity decreased during the 1980s. In 1995, Hardy withdrew their team from the league system. However, Hardy has later returned with teams in local 7-player leagues and old boys leagues, but not in the national league system.
