= Torp IF =

Norwegian sports club

- Full name: Torp Idrætsforening
- Founded: 23 January 1915
- Ground: Torp idrettsplass, Fredrikstad
- League: 5. divisjon
- 2019: 14th

Torp Idrætsforening is a Norwegian multi-sports club from Torp, Fredrikstad, Østfold. It has sections for association football, team handball and amateur wrestling. The club was founded on 23 January 1915.

The men's football team plays in the 5. divisjon, the sixth tier of Norwegian football, being promoted from the 2019 5. divisjon. It formerly had a spell in the 3. divisjon from 1997 through 2003. Before the Second World War II, the club contested the 1937–38, 1938–39 and 1939–40 League of Norway.
