= SK Djerv =

Sports club in Norway

Djerv
- Full name: Sportsklubben Djerv
- Founded: 18 May 1913; 112 years ago
- Ground: Møhlenpris idrettsplass
- Chairman: Roald Rosenlund
- League: 4. divisjon, group 2
- 2018: 5. divisjon, group 1, 1st of 12; (promoted)
- Website: http://www.skdjerv.no/
Home colours	Away colours

Sportsklubben Djerv is a sports club from Møhlenpris, Bergen in Norway. The club was founded on 18 May 1913, and today it has sections for football, floorball, badminton, basketball and gymnastics. The club had an ice hockey department until 1985. The football section currently plays in the 4. divisjon.

== History ==
The club was founded on 18 May 1913 by boys from the Møhlenpris neighbourhood in Bergen.

=== Football ===
In the interwar period, the club's football team achieved good results and challenged Brann as the leading team from Bergen. The football team participated in the inaugural season of national league football in Norway; the 1937–38 Norgesserien. This season, Djerv won their group and reached the championship semi-finals where they were lost 2–3 at home against Lyn and were eliminated. They advanced from the quarter-finals through coin toss after a 6–6 draw against Viking. Djerv played in the top tier for four seasons; 1937–38, 1938–39, 1939–40 (abandoned due to the German occupation) and 1947–48. In 2009, Djerv's football team relegated from 3. divisjon, the fourth tier in the Norwegian football league system, and has played in either the fifth or sixth tier since then.

==== Recent men's football seasons ====
Season		Pos.	Pl.	W	D	L	GS	GA	P	Cup	Notes	Ref.
2013	4. divisjon	3	22	11	4	7	58	42	35 (Note: Djerv were deducted two points due to use of an uneligible player against Bremnes 22 June 2013.)	dnq		
2014	4. divisjon	6	22	9	3	10	48	46	30	First qualifying round		
2015	4. divisjon	↓ 13	24	3	2	19	45	74	11	dnq	Relegated to 5. divisjon	
2016	5. divisjon	↑ 1	22	18	1	3	83	22	55	dnq	Promoted to 4. divisjon	
2017	4. divisjon	↓ 11	22	5	4	13	34	72	19	dnq	Relegated to 5. divisjon	
2018	5. divisjon	↑ 1	22	18	2	2	82	20	56	dnq	Promoted to 4. divisjon	

=== Ice hockey ===
Djerv's ice hockey section won several league championships in the 1980s. The ice hockey section merged with Bergen Ishockeyklubb in 1985 and formed Bergen/Djerv which later went bankrupt.
