= IL Brodd =

Norwegian football club

Brodd
- Full name: Brodd Fotballklubb Stavanger
- Founded: 25 April 1913; 112 years ago
- Ground: Midjord idrettspark, Storhaug, Stavanger
- Capacity: 900
- Chairman: Hanne Elise Pollack
- Manager: Ali Kilinc
- League: Third Division
- 2024: Third Division group 2, 3rd of 14
Home colours

Brodd Fotballklubb is a Norwegian football club from Stavanger.

The club was founded on 25 April 1913 as BK Brodd. It participated in competitions for the first time in 1915, and reached the inaugural League of Norway in 1937–38. In 1940 it merged with the former AIF club Arbeidernes TIL and took the name IL Brodd. After the Second World War, the club had sections for football, athletics, boxing, cycling, skiing and handball. Most sports disappeared, with football being left standing, but after 2003 the sports handball, badminton and floorball were added.

15.06.2010 IL Brodd changed their name to Brodd Fotballklubb Stavanger, while handball, badminton and floorball was established as separate sports clubs.

The men's football team currently resides in the Third Division (fourth tier), where its current stint began in 2008.

Both coaches of Viking FK, Morten Christoffer Jensen and Bjarte Lunde Aarsheim have previously been part of the club.

== Personnel ==
=== Technical staff ===
Position	Staff
Head coach	(Norway) Ali Kilinc
Head Assistant coach	(Norway) Adil Lakrimi
Goalkeeping coach	(Norway) Karl Fredrik Røsland
Equipment manager	(Norway) Tor Inge Børslid Brendøy
Equipment manager	(Norway) Thomas Monslaup
Chiropractor	(Norway) Christer Robertson

=== Administrative staff ===
Position	Staff
CEO	(Norway) Kyrre Sandven
Head of development	(Norway) Rune Larsen

== Recent seasons ==
Season		Pos.	Pl.	W	D	L	GS	GA	P	Cup	Notes
2008	3. divisjon	11	26	6	3	17	39	78	21	First round	
2009	3. divisjon	8	26	12	1	13	49	58	37	Second qualifying round	
2010	3. divisjon	8	24	13	5	6	51	30	54	First round	
2011	3. divisjon	4	24	12	6	8	60	46	42	First round	
2012	3. divisjon	6	26	13	3	10	70	59	42	Second qualifying round	
2013	3. divisjon	↓ 14	26	7	2	17	57	82	23	First round	Relegated
2014	4. divisjon	↑ 1	22	16	3	3	61	17	51	First round	Promoted
2015	3. divisjon	11	26	10	4	12	43	52	34	First round	
2016	3. divisjon	4	26	14	6	6	58	24	48	First qualifying round	
2017	3. divisjon	10	26	9	6	11	47	53	33	First round	
2018	3. divisjon	5	26	13	4	9	66	47	43	Second qualifying round	
2019	3. divisjon	9	26	9	5	12	51	50	32	First round	
2020	Season cancelled										
2021	3. divisjon	5	13	6	3	4	15	19	21	First round	
2022	3. divisjon	4	26	14	2	10	36	35	44	First round	

== Managerial history ==
- (Iceland) Gestur Ingvarsson (2003)
- (Norway) Erik Tangen (2004–2005)
- (Norway) Ronny Deila (November 2005 - January 2006)
- (Norway) Richard Bjerga (2006–2008)
- (Norway) Tor Magne Madsen (2008)
- (Norway) Knut Skeie Solberg & (Norway) Arturo Cleveland (2009–2010)
- (Norway) Erik Løland (2011)
- (Norway) Endre Tangen (January - March 2012)
- (Norway) Ole Fredrik Bergseth (March 2012 – 2013)
- (Norway) Rune Larsen & Esben Ertzeid (Norway) (2014)
- (Norway) Bjarte Lunde Aarsheim (2015)
- (Norway) Kristian Hoem Sørli (2016–2017)
- (Portugal) António Silva (2018)
- (Norway) Aleksander Midtsian (2019)
- (Norway) Ali Kilinc (2020–)
