= Jevnaker IF =

Norwegian sports club founded 1911

- Full name: Jevnaker Idrettsforening
- Founded: 1 June 1911
- Ground: Jevnaker kunstgress
- League: Third Division
- 2012: Third Division/ 2, 5th
Home colours	Away colours

Jevnaker Idrettsforening is a Norwegian sports club from Jevnaker. It has sections for association football, speed skating, gymnastics and skiing.

== Football ==
The men's football team currently plays in the Third Division, the third tier of Norwegian football, having been relegated from the Second Division in 2011. The team won promotion to the Second Division in 2010, after winning the Buskerud section of the Third Division and a playoff match against Tornado Måløy. It played in the First Division as late as in 1996, and had its previous stint in the Second Division in 1999.

=== Recent history ===
Season		Pos.	Pl.	W	D	L	GS	GA	P	Cup	Notes
2008	D3	8	22	7	7	8	43	45	28		
2009	D3	2	22	14	4	4	68	35	46		
2010	D3	1	22	15	3	4	62	41	48		Promoted
2011	D2	12	24	7	1	16	42	64	22	1st round	Relegated
2012	D3	5	26	13	3	10	69	53	42	1st round	
2013 (in progress)	D3	3	25	18	4	3	101	35	58	2nd qualifying round	

== Speed skating and athletics ==
Speed skaters include Ivar Ballangrud, Sverre Haugli and Maren Haugli.

The club was formerly active in athletics. Two throwers have taken national championship medals for the club. Karl Granli took two silver medals in javelin throw in 1928 and 1929, and bronze medals in 1930 and 1932. Johs Jacobsen won bronze medals in the shot put in 1927 and 1928. The club also arranged the Norwegian Cross-Country Championships, long course (10/20 km) in 1993.
