= SK Snøgg =

Norwegian sports club

- Full name: Sportsklubben Snøgg
- Founded: 5 March 1905; 121 years ago
- Ground: Notodden stadion Notodden

Sportsklubben Snøgg is a Norwegian multi-sports club from Notodden Municipality. It was founded on 5 March 1905.

The men's football team played in the highest league for the 1951–52 season. After the 1999 season, the team merged with Heddal IL's men's team to form Notodden FK. Notodden FK is a second-tier club.

Snøgg is now a decent athletics club. Their first medal in the Norwegian athletics championships, a gold medal, was taken by Jonas Lie in 1908. He won the javelin throw with both hands in 1908 and 1910, and the discus throw with both hands in 1909. In addition, he won four silver medals and two bronze medals. Next, Halvor Øien won the javelin event in 1917 and 1918, and also took two silver and three bronze. Since then, the club has had two Norwegian champions, Grete Etholm in the discus throw (first time 2001) and Christian Settemsli Mogstad in the sprints (first time 2008). High jumper Olav Aarnes did not win any national medals, but was a 1912 Olympian.

Two Olympic wrestlers have represented the club; silver medalist in 1948 Aage Eriksen (also participated in 1952) and Håkon Olsen (participated in 1952).
