= FK Donn =

Norwegian sports club

Donn
- Full name: Donn Toppfotball
- Founded: 24 June 1909; 116 years ago
- Ground: Kristiansand Stadion, Kristiansand
- Capacity: 16,600
- Head coach: Kjetil Ruthford Pedersen
- League: 4. divisjon (men)
- 2023: 3. divisjon, group 4, 13th of 14 (relegated)
Home colours	Away colours

Fotballklubben Donn is a Norwegian football club from the neighbourhood Lund in Kristiansand, most notable for its women's football team. It was founded on 24 June 1909 and named after a dog.

== Donn Toppfotball ==
The women's football team Donn Toppfotball played in Toppserien, the highest tier of women's football in Norway, for two periods. The first spell was between 1993 and 1995, and the club also reached the final of the Norwegian Women's Cup in 1994 where they were beaten by Trondheims-Ørn. Charmaine Hooper, the most capped Canadian player, played for Donn during this heyday for the club. The women's team also played in Toppserien in 2010.

The women's team won promotion in the 2009 season, and they reconstituted themselves as a professional outfit called Donn Toppfotball. After finishing 9th in 2010 Toppserien, Donn Toppfotball was bankrupted.

=== Recent women's seasons ===
Season		Pos.	Pl.	W	D	L	GS	GA	P	Cup	Notes
2007	1D	7	18	7	2	9	23	32	23	2nd round	
2008	1D	5	18	7	4	7	24	34	25	3rd round	
2009	1D	2	22	12	5	5	52	21	41	3rd round	Promoted to Toppserien
2010	TS	9	22	6	2	14	25	45	20	3rd round	

== Men's team ==
The men's football team played in the top tier from 1937 to 1948 but, at that time, the league was organized differently with several groups. In the recent years, the men's team have played in the Third Division (fourth tier) since 1994, except a short visit in the Second Division in 2004, and one year in the Fourth Division in 2011.

=== Recent men's seasons ===
Season		Pos.	Pl.	W	D	L	GS	GA	P	Cup	Notes
2018	3. divisjon	5	26	12	5	9	63	48	41	First qualifying round	
2019	3. divisjon	11	26	9	4	13	40	60	31	First round	
