= IF Urædd =

Norwegian sports club

IF Urædd is a Norwegian sports club from Porsgrunn, founded in 1880. Since 8 December 1993 it has been an alliance sports team, with independent sections for football, handball, sport wrestling, skiing, gymnastics, basketball, athletics and speed skating.

Its football section Urædd FK, athletics section Urædd Friidrett and handball section Urædd Håndball are the best known nationwide.

== Urædd Friidrett ==
Urædd Friidrett
- Full name: Urædd Friidrett
- Founded: 1917
- Ground: Kjølnes stadion Porsgrunn

Urædd Friidrett is the athletics department of the alliance club IF Urædd from Porsgrunn, which was founded in 1880. The athletics section within IF Urædd was established in 1917.

The athletics team uses the stadium Kjølnes stadion.

Its most prominent members are Lars Arvid Nilsen, Georg Andersen, Svein Inge Valvik and Olav Jenssen, who all competed in throwing events. Andersen and Nilsen originally won the silver and bronze medals in shot put at the 1991 World Championships in Athletics, but Andersen was disqualified and lost the medal due to a doping offence.

== Urædd Fotball ==
Urædd Fotball
Home colours

The men's football team currently resides in the 3. divisjon, the fourth tier of Norwegian football, having won promotion after a brief stint of one season down in the 4. Divisjon in 2012. The club played in the Norwegian Cup final in 1904 as Porsgrunds FC and in 1911, which they lost 5–2 against Lyn. Urædd's junior team for girls won the Telenor Cup, the national junior cup for Under-19 girls, in 2010, with a 4–1 win over Fløya in Tromsdalen.

=== Recent seasons (women's) ===
Season		Pos.	Pl.	W	D	L	GS	GA	P	Cup	Notes
2014	1D	3	22	12	3	7	44	27	39	3rd round	
2015	1D	↑ 1	22	17	2	3	65	24	53	2nd round	Promoted to the Toppserien
2016	TS	↓ 12	22	1	3	18	12	72	6	2nd round	Relegated to the 1. divisjon
2017	1D	2	22	12	5	5	54	25	41	2nd round	
2018	1D	↓ 11	22	5	7	10	21	34	22	1st round	Relegated

== Urædd Håndball ==
The handball department was established in the 1930s. The handball department has won the Norwegian Championship three times, in 1984–85, 1987–88 and in 1991–92, and the Norwegian Cup twice in 1986-87 and 1987–88. As of 2026 they are currently playing in the 3rd Division, the fourth tier of Norwegian handball.
