= 1936 Norwegian Football Cup =

Norgesmesterskapet i fotball for menn 1936

Tournament details
- Country: Norway
- Teams: 128 (main competition)

Final positions
- Champions: Fredrikstad (3rd title)
- Runners-up: Mjøndalen

The 1936 Norwegian Football Cup was the 35th season of the Norwegian annual knockout football tournament. The tournament was open for all members of NFF, except those from Northern Norway. The final was played at Ullevaal Stadion in Oslo on 25 October 1936, and was contested by the defending champions Fredrikstad and the two-time former winners Mjøndalen. Fredrikstad successfully defended their title with a 2–0 victory, securing their third Norwegian Cup trophy.

== Rounds and dates ==
- First round: 23 August
- Second round: 30 August
- Third round: 13 September
- Fourth round: 27 September
- Quarter-finals: 4 October
- Semi-finals: 11 October
- Final: 25 October

== First round ==
| Team 1 | Score | Team 2 |
|---|---|---|
| Aalesund | 12–2 | Sandane |
| Årstad | 1–5 | Viking |
| Berger | 4–0 | Skiens BK |
| Borg | 3–2 | Dæhlenengen |
| Brage | 8–1 | Strinda |
| Brann | 5–0 | Viggo |
| Briskebyen | 0–8 | Fredrikstad |
| Brodd | 2–1 | Klepp |
| Clausenengen | 4–2 (a.e.t.) | Rosenborg |
| Djerv | 8–1 | Trane |
| Donn | 1–3 | Storm |
| Drafn | 3–2 | Start |
| Eidsvold Turn | 1–6 | Lyn |
| Elverum | 1–3 | Hamar |
| Flekkefjord | 5–0 | Egersund |
| Fram (Larvik) | 4–0 | Drøbak |
| Freidig | 5–0 | Jarlen |
| Freidig Skarnes | 1–2 | Lillestrøm |
| Fremad Lillehammer | 6–1 | Trygg (Oslo) |
| Frigg | 0–1 | Rolvsøy |
| Glassverket | 4–3 | Larvik Turn |
| Gleng | 3–1 | Fredensborg |
| Grane | 1–3 | Pors |
| Gresvik | 0–2 | Mjøndalen |
| Holmestrand | 2–5 | Torp |
| Jevnaker | 9–0 | Falk |
| Kapp | 5–2 | Eidsvold |
| Kjelsås | 1–2 | Skiold |
| Kongsberg | 4–0 | Rjukan |
| Kongsten | 6–0 | Gjøa |
| Lisleby | 6–1 | Ullevål |
| Liv | 2–3 | Moss |
| Lyn (Gjøvik) | 4–3 | Skeid |
| Magnor | 0–3 | Grue |
| Namsos | 0–1 | Steinkjer |
| Neset | 4–1 | National |
| Odd | 6–1 | Halsen |
| Orkanger | 1–3 | Braatt |
| Ørn | 1–1 (a.e.t.) | Sundjordet |
| Rakkestad | 0–7 | Kvik Halden |
| Ranheim | 3–2 | Kvik (Trondheim) |
| Raufoss | 4–0 | Lillehammer BK |
| Rollon | 4–0 | Hødd |
| Roy (Hurum) | 0–4 | Eiker |
| Sandefjord BK | 1–6 | Sarpsborg |
| Selbak | 8–0 | Hølen |
| Skiens-Grane | 1–1 (a.e.t.) | Drammens BK |
| Skreia | 2–3 | Nydalen |
| Solberg | 0–2 | Tønsberg Turn |
| Sparta | 0–1 | Geithus |
| Stord | 2–3 | Jarl |
| Strømmen | 6–3 | B.14 |
| Tistedalen | 3–0 | Stabæk |
| Tønsberg-Kameratene | 1–3 | Strømsgodset |
| Ulf | 2–3 | Stavanger |
| Urædd | 0–2 | Vigør |
| Vålerengen | 7–0 | Fossekallen |
| Vard | 2–0 | Frøya (Bergen) |
| Verdal | 4–1 | Sverre |
| Veblungsnes | 1–2 | Kristiansund |
| Vestfossen | 1–6 | Snøgg |
| Vestre Gran | 0–3 | Vardal |
| Vikersund | 2–1 | Strong |
| Voss | 1–2 | Hardy |
Replay
| Drammens BK | 2–0 | Skiens-Grane |
| Sundjordet | 1–3 | Ørn |

== Second round ==
| Team 1 | Score | Team 2 |
|---|---|---|
| Braatt | 3–2 | Freidig |
| Brage | 4–2 | Neset |
| Drammens BK | 1–4 | Selbak |
| Eiker | 5–1 | Raufoss |
| Flekkefjord | 0–1 | Brodd |
| Fram (Larvik) | 3–1 | Gleng |
| Fredrikstad | 8–0 | Glassverket |
| Fremad Lillehammer | 0–1 | Vålerengen |
| Geithus | 0–4 | Lisleby |
| Hamar | 2–4 | Aalesund |
| Hardy | 4–0 | Stavanger |
| Jarl | 1–0 | Djerv |
| Kvik Halden | 2–0 | Lyn (Gjøvik) |
| Lillestrøm | 10–0 | Grue |
| Lyn | 3–0 | Kongsten |
| Mjøndalen | 4–1 | Berger |
| Moss | 3–2 | Kapp |
| Nydalen | 8–1 | Vikersund |
| Pors | 2–1 | Kongsberg |
| Ranheim | 3–0 | Kristiansund |
| Rollon | 2–0 | Clausenengen |
| Sarpsborg | 13–2 | Strømmen |
| Skiold | 4–2 | Tistedalen |
| Snøgg | 0–3 | Odd |
| Steinkjer | 2–1 | Verdal |
| Storm | 3–1 | Drafn |
| Strømsgodset | 2–0 | Brann |
| Tønsberg Turn | 0–2 | Borg |
| Torp | w/o (Note: Rolvsøy refused to play away against Torp since they demanded a home game after playing away in both first and second qualifying round. (Aftenposten, 31 August 1936.)) | Rolvsøy |
| Vardal | 1–3 | Jevnaker |
| Vigør | 1–7 | Ørn |
| Viking | 9–4 | Vard |

== Third round ==
| Team 1 | Score | Team 2 |
|---|---|---|
| Aalesund | 3–2 | Torp |
| Borg | 0–3 | Mjøndalen |
| Brage | 2–4 | Lyn |
| Brodd | 0–5 | Hardy |
| Jevnaker | 3–7 | Fredrikstad |
| Kvik Halden | 0–0 (a.e.t.) | Pors |
| Lillestrøm | 0–1 | Fram (Larvik) |
| Lisleby | 3–1 | Jarl |
| Moss | 7–2 | Braatt |
| Odd | 3–2 | Nydalen |
| Ørn | 8–0 | Eiker |
| Steinkjer | 1–1 (a.e.t.) | Ranheim |
| Strømsgodset | 0–1 | Sarpsborg |
| Vålerengen | 2–0 | Rollon |
| Selbak | 4–2 | Storm |
| Skiold | 1–0 (a.e.t.) | Viking |
Replay
| Pors | 2–0 | Kvik Halden |
| Ranheim | 3–0 | Steinkjer |

== Fourth round ==
| Team 1 | Score | Team 2 |
|---|---|---|
| Fram (Larvik) | 2–3 | Lisleby |
| Fredrikstad | 2–0 | Skiold |
| Hardy | 1–2 | Vålerengen |
| Lyn | 2–3 | Moss |
| Mjøndalen | 1–0 | Aalesund |
| Pors | 1–0 (a.e.t.) | Selbak |
| Ranheim | 1–3 | Odd |
| Sarpsborg | 8–1 | Ørn |

== Quarter-finals ==
| Team 1 | Score | Team 2 |
|---|---|---|
| Lisleby | 6–1 | Pors |
| Sarpsborg | 1–2 (Note: Played in Fredrikstad.) | Moss |
| Odd | 1–3 | Fredrikstad |
| Vålerengen | 0–1 | Mjøndalen |

== Semi-finals ==
| Team 1 | Score | Team 2 |
|---|---|---|
| Fredrikstad | 2–1 | Lisleby |
| Mjøndalen | 3–2 | Moss |

== Final ==
25 October 1936

| Fredrikstad | 2–0 | Mjøndalen |
|---|---|---|
| Brynildsen 43', 89' | Report |

Ullevaal Stadion, Oslo
Attendance: 20,000
Referee: Kåre Gunnar Kinn (Eidsvold)

== See also ==
- 1936 in Norwegian football
