= 1929 Norwegian Football Cup =

Norgesmesterskapet i fotball for menn 1929

Tournament details
- Country: Norway
- Teams: 128

Final positions
- Champions: Sarpsborg (2nd title)
- Runners-up: Ørn

The 1929 Norwegian Football Cup was the 28th season of the Norwegian annual knockout football tournament. The tournament was open for all members of NFF, except those from Northern Norway. The final was played at Stavanger Stadion in Stavanger on 20 October 1929, and was contested by the defending champions Ørn and Sarpsborg, who had last won the tournament in 1917. Sarpsborg won the final 2-1 after extra time, and secured their second Norwegian Cup championship.

== Rounds and dates ==
- First round:4 August.
- Second round: 11 August.
- Third round: 25 August.
- Fourth round: 1 September.
- Quarter-finals: 15 September.
- Semi-finals: 6 October.
- Final: 14 October.

== First round ==
Team 1	Score	Team 2
Bangsund	0–6	Sverre
Bergmann	2–0	National
Birkebeineren	3–5	Kongsberg
Braatt	0–3	Kvik (Trondheim)
Brage	6–0	Strinda
Brann	7–0	Ulf
Bøn	2–1	Kapp
Drafn	3–1	Geithus
Dæhlenengen	3–2	Torp
Egersund	4–1	Flekkefjord
Ekeberg	0–8	Drammens BK
Falk	3–1	Skotfoss
Fossekallen	1–4	Sandefjord
Fram Brumunddal	1–0 (a.e.t.)	Eidsvold IF
Fredrikstad	15–0	Strømmen
Frøya Sandnes	1–6	Stavanger
Gjøa	6–1	Kongsten
Lyn (Gjøvik)	1–1 (a.e.t.)	B.14
Grane (Arendal)	2–3	Start
Grane (Sandvika)	6–4	Jevnaker
Gråbein	1–10	Mjøndalen
Hadelands-Kvik	2–7	Frigg
Hardy	0–1	Djerv
Hof	2–3	Grue
Holmestrand	3–1	Berger
Kragerø	2–1	Donn
Kråkstad	0–6	Moss
Kvik Halden	16–0	Roy
Langevåg	0–7	Aalesund
Larvik Turn	2–1 (a.e.t.)	Skiens BK
Lierfoss	0–13	Lillestrøm
Lillehammer BK	1–4	Fremad Lillehammer
Lillestrømkameratene	2–4 (a.e.t.)	Skiold
Lyn	13–1	Haga
Mandalskameratene	1–1 (a.e.t.)	Brodd
Neset	7–1	Freidig
Nydalen	0–6	Strong
Ny-Solheim	4–0	Draug
Odd	2–0	Eiker
Rapp	9–0	Varden
Raufoss	5–2	Bygdø BK
Rjukan	1–2	Pors
Rollon	3–5	Kristiansund
Rolvsøy	0–1	Sarpsborg
Selbak	5–0	Hasle
Ski	0–8	Ørn
Snøgg	0–5	Fram Larvik
Stabæk	0–2 (a.e.t.)	Skeid
Steinkjer	6–1	Namsos
Strømsgodset	4–1	Liv
Sørumsand	0–4	Kongsvinger
Tistedalen	3–4	Lisleby
Trysilgutten	1–5	Hamar
Tønsberg Turn	7–2	Oslokameratene
Ulefoss	0–2	Storm
Ullensaker	2–0	Trygg Oslo
Urædd	5–1	Tell (Notodden)
Vard	7–4	Stord
Vigør	2–0	Eydehavn
Vikersund	0–2	Tønsberg-Kameratene
Viking	4–0	Minde
Voss	0–2	Årstad
Vålerengen	3–2	Eidsvold Turn
Aasguten	0–6	Ranheim
Replay
B.14	0–5	Lyn (Gjøvik)
Brodd	4–0	Mandalskameratene

== Second round ==
Team 1	Score	Team 2
Brodd	3–0	Vigør
Bøn	1–4	Kvik Halden
Drammens BK	12–0	Fram Brumunddal
Fram Larvik	1–4	Strong
Fremad Lillehammer	0–0 (a.e.t.)	Brage
Frigg	1–0	Skeid
Lyn (Gjøvik)	2–1	Raufoss
Hamar	2–6	Fredrikstad
Kongsberg	2–3 (a.e.t.)	Odd
Kongsvinger	1–6	Lyn
Kragerø	1–9	Urædd
Kristiansund	4–2	Rapp
Kvik (Trondheim)	1–2	Neset
Lillestrøm	0–3	Strømsgodset
Lisleby	4–0	Holmestrand
Mjøndalen	4–0	Grane (Sandvika)
Moss	6–1	Ullensaker
Ny-Solheim	3–3 (a.e.t.)	Årstad
Pors	2–2 (a.e.t.)	Selbak
Ranheim	8–0	Bergmann
Sandefjord	2–3	Drafn
Sarpsborg	16–0	Grue
Skiold	1–3	Gjøa
Start	1–2	Viking
Stavanger	5–0	Egersund
Storm	1–3	Falk
Sverre	3–1	Steinkjer
Tønsberg-Kameratene	2–1	Tønsberg Turn
Vard	2–12	Brann
Vålerengen	0–1	Larvik Turn
Ørn	3–1	Dæhlenengen
Aalesund	8–1	Djerv
Replay
Brage	3–1	Fremad Lillehammer
Selbak	3–4 (a.e.t.)	Pors
Årstad	0–2	Ny-Solheim

== Third round ==
Team 1	Score	Team 2
Strømsgodset	2–3	Aalesund
Brage	2–4	Frigg
Brann	6–2	Lisleby
Stavanger	2–0	Brodd
Drafn	1–5	Sarpsborg
Fredrikstad	3–4 (a.e.t.)	Drammens BK
Falk	2–1	Mjøndalen
Gjøa	6–3	Kristiansund
Kvik (Halden)	4–2 (a.e.t.)	Lyn (Gjøvik)
Larvik Turn	2–3	Pors
Strong	0–7	Lyn
Odd	5–4	Moss
Ranheim	2–1 (a.e.t.)	Neset
Viking	8–1	Ny-Solheim
Ørn	10–0	Sverre
Urædd	5–2	Tønsbergkameratene

== Fourth round ==
Team 1	Score	Team 2
Aalesund	2–3 (a.e.t.)	Kvik (Halden)
Viking	0–1 (a.e.t.)	Brann
Drammens BK	1–0 (a.e.t.)	Lyn
Pors	0–3	Falk
Frigg	0–2	Stavanger
Sarpsborg	3–0	Gjøa
Ranheim	2–6	Odd
Ørn	2–1	Urædd

== Quarter-finals ==
Team 1	Score	Team 2
Brann	1–2	Sarpsborg
Stavanger	2–0	Drammens BK
Odd	0–1	Falk
Kvik (Halden)	1–6	Ørn

== Semi-finals ==
Team 1	Score	Team 2
Sarpsborg	1–0	Falk
Ørn	4–0	Stavanger

== Final ==
20 October 1929

Sarpsborg	2–1 (a.e.t.)	Ørn
Yven 42'; Gundersen 103'	Report	Dahl 75'

Stavanger Stadion, Stavanger
Attendance: 13,000
Referee: Thoralf Kristiansen (Gjøa)

== See also ==
- 1929 in Norwegian football
