= 1937 Norwegian Football Cup =

Norgesmesterskapet i fotball for menn 1937

Tournament details
- Country: Norway
- Teams: 128 (main competition)

Final positions
- Champions: Mjøndalen (3rd title)
- Runners-up: Odd

The 1937 Norwegian Football Cup was the 36th season of the Norwegian annual knockout football tournament. The tournament was open for all members of NFF, except those from Northern Norway. The final was played at Urædd Stadion in Porsgrunn on 17 October 1937, and was contested by the previous year's losing finalist Mjøndalen and the eleven–time former winners Odd. Mjøndalen secured their third title with a 4–2 win in the final. Fredrikstad were the defending champions, but were eliminated by Mjøndalen in the semifinal.

== Rounds and dates ==
- First round: 6 June
- Second round: 20 June
- Third round: 27 June
- Fourth round: 15 August
- Quarter-finals: 29 August
- Semi-finals: 26 September
- Final: 17 October

== First round ==
Team 1	Score	Team 2
Aalesund	2–1	Hødd
Årstad	1–1 (a.e.t.)	Trane
Braatt	4–0	Rollon
Briskebyen	3–1	Biri
Djerv	4–0	Pallas
Drammens BK	5–0	Borre
Eidsvold IF	6–5	B.14
Eiker	1–3	Berger
Falk	4–3	Lyn (Gjøvik)
Fredrikstad	13–0	Rakkestad
Fremad Lillehammer	4–2	Fredensborg
Geithus	3–4	Gresvik
Gjøa	3–0	Fram Brumunddal
Grane	0–1	Odd
Grue	1–7	Selbak
Halsen	2–1	Gleng
Hamar	1–0 (a.e.t.)	Mercantile
Hardy	5–1	Frøya (Bergen)
Høyanger	1–7	Brann
Jarl	5–1	Brodd
Kapp	2–1	Vestre Gran
Kongsten	0–2	Jevnaker
Kongsvinger	0–1	Frigg
Kragerø	2–5	Urædd
Kristiansund	5–0	Tryggkam
Kvik (Halden)	6–2	Greåker
Larvik Turn	1–0	Speed
Lillestrøm	1–0	Frogg
Liv	5–0	Kampørn
Lyn	12–2	Vang
Mjøndalen	11–0	Sem
Molde	1–3	Clausenengen
Moss	11–0	Hølen
National	4–5	Kvik
Neset	8–0	Verdal
Nydalen	8–1	Kongsberg
Orkanger	3–1	Freidig
Pors	3–0	Donn
Ranheim	12–1	Bergmann
Raufoss	3–0	Kjelsås
Rjukan	0–4	Drafn
Rolvsøy	4–1	Ørn
Rosenborg	3–0	Brage
Sarpsborg	4–2	Trygg Oslo
Skeid	14–0	Grane Sandvika
Skiens BK	0–1	Tønsberg-Kameratene
Skiold	5–0	Drøbak
Snøgg	3–2 (a.e.t.)	Brevik
Sørumsand	0–11	Vålerengen
Start	1–0	Ulf
Stavanger	4–0	Ålgård
Steinkjer	9–1	Namsos
Storm	3–2 (a.e.t.)	Solberg
Strong	7–1	Magnor
Strømsgodset	2–0	Dæhlenengen
Sverre	5–1	Dalguten
Tistedalen	4–3	Borg
Tønsberg Turn	1–5	Sparta Drammen
Torp	8–1	Hugin
Vard	5–0	Viggo
Vardal	3–5 (a.e.t.)	Lisleby
Vigør	2–0	Flekkefjord
Vikersund	0–11	Fram (Larvik)
Viking	10–2	Djerv 1919
Replay
Trane	1–4	Årstad

== Second round ==
Team 1	Score	Team 2
Aalesund	4–0	Braatt
Berger	3–2 (a.e.t.)	Sarpsborg
Brann	9–0	Årstad
Briskebyen	0–3	Mjøndalen
Clausenengen	3–2	Neset
Djerv	3–0	Stavanger
Drafn	1–2	Lillestrøm
Falk	0–5	Kvik (Halden)
Fram (Larvik)	3–0	Rolvsøy
Fremad Lillehammer	1–3	Lyn
Frigg	1–1 (a.e.t.)	Snøgg
Gresvik	2–1 (Note: Drammens BK Protested because the goal posts were to tall. The protest was denied by the NFF. Aftenposten, 24 June 1937.)	Drammens BK
Jarl	3–1	Start
Jevnaker	7–0	Kapp
Kristiansund	3–1 (Note: Skeid protested due to a KFK substitution of a player Skeid claimed to not be injured. The protest was rejected by the NFF due to lack of evidence that the player left the pitch unharmed. Aftenposten 24 June 1937.)	Skeid
Kvik	0–5	Steinkjer
Lisleby	6–1	Halsen
Liv	1–3	Pors
Nydalen	8–0	Strømsgodset
Odd	4–0	Larvik Turn
Raufoss	1–4	Strong
Rosenborg	3–2	Orkanger
Selbak	4–3	Hamar
Skiold	1–2	Storm
Sparta Drammen	2–4	Moss
Sverre	2–3 (Note: Rematch after protest. Ranheim used an uneligible player in the first game, Sverre's protest was approved. Aftenposten 30 June 1937.)	Ranheim
Tistedalen	3–0	Gjøa
Tønsberg-Kameratene	0–5	Fredrikstad
Urædd	4–1	Torp
Vålerengen	1–1 (a.e.t.)	Eidsvold IF
Vard	0–0 (a.e.t.)	Hardy
Vigør	2–6	Viking
Replay
Eidsvold IF	1–5	Vålerengen
Hardy	3–2	Vard
Ranheim	1–0	Sverre
Snøgg	1–2	Frigg

== Third round ==
Team 1	Score	Team 2
Fredrikstad	8–0	Aalesund
Frigg	0–4	Jevnaker
Hardy	4–2 (a.e.t.)	Jarl
Kristiansund	2–1	Nydalen
Kvik (Halden)	4–0	Urædd
Lillestrøm	1–1 (a.e.t.)	Lisleby
Lyn	3–1	Djerv
Mjøndalen	5–1	Selbak
Moss	4–3	Vålerengen
Odd	4–0	Gresvik
Pors	0–1	Tistedalen
Ranheim	4–4 (a.e.t.)	Clausenengen
Steinkjer	0–5	Rosenborg
Storm	2–0	Berger
Strong	1–4	Fram (Larvik)
Viking	3–2	Brann
Replay
Clausenengen	3–2	Ranheim
Lisleby	7–1	Lillestrøm

== Fourth round ==
Team 1	Score	Team 2
Clausenengen	1–5	Mjøndalen
Fram (Larvik)	2–1 (a.e.t.)	Kvik (Halden)
Hardy	0–5	Lyn
Jevnaker	5–1 (a.e.t.)	Moss
Lisleby	2–1	Kristiansund
Rosenborg	0–5	Fredrikstad
Tistedalen	2–4	Odd
Viking	2–2 (a.e.t.)	Storm
Replay
Storm	0–1	Viking

== Quarter-finals ==
Team 1	Score	Team 2
Fredrikstad	2–1	Viking
Lyn	3–2	Jevnaker
Mjøndalen	3–2	Lisleby
Odd	1–0	Fram (Larvik)

== Semi-finals ==
Team 1	Score	Team 2
Mjøndalen	2–1 (Note: Played at Ullevaal Stadion in Oslo.)	Fredrikstad
Odd	2–1 (Note: Played in Tønsberg.)	Lyn

== Final ==
17 October 1937

Mjøndalen	4–2	Odd
Pettersen 5'; Temte 55'; E. Andersen 67', 86'	Report	Forberg 37'; Holmberg 65'

Urædd Stadion, Porsgrunn
Attendance: 17,000
Referee: Alf Simensen (Sarpsborg)

== See also ==
- 1937 in Norwegian football
