= 1928 Norwegian Football Cup =

Norgesmesterskapet i fotball for menn 1928

Tournament details
- Country: Norway
- Teams: 118

Final positions
- Champions: Ørn (3rd title)
- Runners-up: Lyn

The 1928 Norwegian Football Cup was the 27th season of the Norwegian annual knockout football tournament. The tournament was open for all members of NFF, except those from Northern Norway. The final was played at Halden Stadion in Halden on 14 October 1928, and was contested by the defending champions Ørn and the four-time former winners Lyn. Ørn successfully defended their title with a 2–1 victory, securing their third Norwegian Cup trophy.

== Rounds and dates ==
- First round: 5 August. 58 games, 2 teams had walkovers. 118 teams in total.
- Second round: 12 August. 27 games, 5 teams had walkovers.
- Third round: 26 August.
- Fourth round: 2 and 9 September.
- Quarter-finals: 16 and 23 September.
- Semi-finals: 30 September and 7 October.
- Final: 14 October.

== First round ==
Team 1	Score	Team 2
Agnes	1–2	Odd
BSK av 1914	1–2	Stabæk
Bangsund	2–0	Strinda
Bergmann	0–4	Rapp
Blink	0–4	Brage
Brann	8–0	Ny-Solheim
Brodd	4–0	Egersund
Donn	3–2	Grane (Arendal)
Eidsvold IF	4–2 (Note: For unknown reasons, Eidsvold were disqualified. Neither of the two teams participated in the second round.)	Hof
Eiker	8–0	Fossekallen
Falk (Horten)	7–1	Gråbein
Fram Brumunddal	6–2	Lillehammer BK
Fram (Larvik)	4–1	Nanset
Fredrikstad	2–1	Ski
Freidig	1–3	National
Fremad Filtvedt	2–8	Kvik Halden
Fremad Lillehammer	3–0	Bøn
Frigg	13–1	Ekeberg
Geithus	1–5	Ørn
Lyn (Gjøvik)	4–2	Birkebeineren
Grue	4–0	Årnes
Hamar	6–0	Tynset
Hardy	2–8	Viking
Hasle	5–5 (a.e.t.)	Strong
Holmestrand	2–4	Østsiden FK
Jevnaker	6–2	Kampørn
Kapp	1–2	Gjøa
Kongsberg IF	2–5	Drammens BK
Kristiansund	2–3 (a.e.t.)	Rollon
Kvik (Trondheim)	9–2	Steinkjer
Lillestrøm	7–0	Haga
Liv	0–4	Drafn
Minde	6–1	Årstad
Mjøndalen	12–1	Snøgg
Moss	w/o	Drøbak
Nordstrand	1–14	Lisleby
Pors	0–4	Larvik Turn
Ranheim	2–4	Neset
Raufoss	4–1	Hadelands-Kvik
Roy	1–7	Selbak
Sandefjord BK	5–0	Kragerø
Sarpsborg	14–1	Kråkstad
Skiold	2–1	Tønsberg-Kameratene
Skotfos	2–3	Ulefoss
Stavanger	3–2	Mandalskameratene
Stord	1–3	Vard
Strømmen BK	1–2	Lyn
Sverre	7–0	Namsos
Tell (Notodden)	1–2	Vikersund
Torp	4–0	Lillestrømkameratene
Trygg (Oslo)	6–2	Norrøna
Ulf	3–1	Flekkefjord
Urædd	6–2	Rjukan
Verdal	3–2	Harran
Vigør	2–3	Start
Voss	1–4	Djerv (Bergen)
Vålerengen	8–1	Jessheim
Aalesund	10–1	Braatt
Strømsgodset	Bye	
Storm	Bye	
Replay
Strong	8–2	Hasle

== Second round ==
Team 1	Score	Team 2
Brage	2–0	Neset
Brann	3–1	Trygg (Oslo)
Donn	1–5	Start
Drafn	2–0	Jevnaker
Drammens BK	3–0	Raufoss
Fremad Lillehammer	5–1	Vålerengen
Lyn (Gjøvik)	5–0	Grue
Hamar	0–1	Frigg
Kvik Halden	3–2	Lillestrøm
Larvik Turn	7–2	Eiker
Lyn	4–0	Fram Brumunddal
National	10–1	Bangsund
Odd	3–0	Ulefoss
Rapp	1–2	Kvik (Trondheim)
Rollon	0–2	Strømsgodset
Sandefjord BK	1–0	Storm
Selbak	3–1	Mjøndalen
Stabæk	0–8	Sarpsborg
Strong	2–1	Gjøa
Sverre	7–0	Verdal
Ulf	0–5	Stavanger
Urædd	4–0	Falk (Horten)
Vard	2–1	Minde
Vikersund	2–3	Skiold
Viking	1–0	Brodd
Ørn	8–1	Torp
Østsiden FK	3–2	Moss
Lisleby	Bye	
Fredrikstad	Bye	
Fram (Larvik)	Bye	
Djerv	Bye	
Aalesund	Bye	

== Third round ==
Team 1	Score	Team 2
Aalesund	2–1	National
Sverre	1–2	Brage
Frigg	2–4	Brann
Djerv	1–4	Drafn
Odd	4–1	Drammens BK
Start	0–5	Fram (Larvik)
Fredrikstad	11–0	Strong
Strømsgodset	1–0	Fremad
Skiold	2–3	Kvik (Halden)
Kvik (Trondhjem)	2–5	Lyn
Larvik Turn	2–0	Sandefjord
Lisleby	2–1	Selbak
Lyn (Gjøvik)	0–6	Ørn
Sarpsborg	3–2	Østsiden FK
Stavanger	2–3	Urædd
Vard	0–6	Viking

== Fourth round ==
Team 1	Score	Team 2
Brann	4–0	Aalesund
Brage	2–4	Sarpsborg
Drafn	2–1	Larvik Turn
Urædd	3–1	Fram (Larvik)
Viking	1–2	Fredrikstad
Kvik (Halden)	5–3	Lisleby
Lyn	2–3 (Note: Lyn – Odd was annulled after protest.)	Odd
Ørn	3–0	Strømsgodset
Replay
Odd	1–2	Lyn

== Quarter-finals ==
Team 1	Score	Team 2
Sarpsborg	1–1 (a.e.t.)	Brann
Ørn	2–1	Drafn
Fredrikstad	3–1	Urædd
Kvik (Halden)	0–1	Lyn
Replay
Sarpsborg	2–1	Brann

== Semi-finals ==
Team 1	Score	Team 2
Lyn	4–1	Fredrikstad
Ørn	1–1 (a.e.t.)	Sarpsborg
Replay
Ørn	4–3	Sarpsborg

== Final ==
14 October 1928

Ørn	2–1	Lyn
Fredriksen 1'; Thorstensen 53'	Report	Riberg 30'

Halden Stadion, Halden
Attendance: 6,717
Referee: Paulus Nilsen (Brodd)

Ørn:
GK	Gunnar Jacobsen
DF	Knut Ellingsrud
DF	Ingar Pedersen
MF	Yngvar Nustad
MF	Kjell Halvorsen
MF	Fritz Fritzon
FW	Egil Jacobsen
FW	Sverre Fredriksen
FW	Gunnar Dahl
FW	Oscar Thorstensen
FW	Gudmund Fredriksen

Lyn:
GK	Einar Nielsen
DF	Niels Onstad
DF	Per Skou
MF	Gunnar Røvig
MF	Egil Gram Tennefoss
MF	Franz Josef Dahl
FW	Frithjof Resberg
FW	Arne Riberg
FW	Jørgen Juve
FW	Svein Johannessen
FW	Erik Horn

== See also ==
- 1928 in Norwegian football
