= 1947 Norwegian Football Cup =

Norgesmesterskapet i fotball for menn 1947

Tournament details
- Country: Norway
- Teams: 128 (main competition)

Final positions
- Champions: Skeid (1st title)
- Runners-up: Viking

The 1947 Norwegian Football Cup was the 42nd season of the Norwegian annual knockout football tournament. The tournament was open for all members of NFF, except those from Northern Norway. The final was played at Brann Stadion in Bergen on 19 October 1947, and Skeid secured their first title with a 2–0 win against Viking. Skeid had previously played two cup finals but lost both in 1939 and 1940, while it was Viking's second appearance in the final, having previously lost in 1933. Lyn were the defending champions, but were eliminated by Brann in the fourth round.

== First round ==
Team 1	Score	Team 2
Asker	1–1 (a.e.t.)	Fremad Lillehammer
Askim	1–1 (a.e.t.)	Strømmen
B.14	3–0	Drafn
Birkebeineren	9–0	Grue
Borg	2–0	Gjøa
Brann	6–1	Nordnes
Brodd	0–5	Viking
Bækkelaget	1–7	Kongsberg
Djerv	6–2	Falken (Høyanger)
Drøbak-Frogn	4–5	Sandefjord BK
Egersund	0–1	Flekkefjord
Eidsvold IF	0–3	Selbak
Folldal	1–8	Falken (Trondheim)
Fram (Larvik)	2–1	Eiker
Fredrikstad	8–0	Frogner
Gjøvik-Lyn	4–1	Aurskog
Grane (Arendal)	2–4	Larvik Turn
Hamar	5–2	Koppang
Jordal	3–2	Snøgg
Kapp	5–1	Solberg
Kjelsås	3–1	Torp
Kongsvinger	0–1	Moss
Kristiansund	6–0	Åndalsnes
Lena	1–4	Drammens BK
Lillestrøm	3–0	Pors
Lisleby	5–3	Slemmestad
Liull	0–2	Frigg
Lyn	4–2	Greåker
Lyn (Trondheim)	0–2 (Note: Rematch after protest.)	Rosenborg
Melhus	0–3	Steinkjer
Mesna	1–8	Skeid
Mjøndalen	2–0	Sundjordet
Molde	1–2	Clausenengen
Mysen	2–1	Nydalen
National	1–0	Brage
Nymark	4–1	Os
Orkanger	1–4	Freidig
Rakkestad	2–1 (a.e.t.)	Kvik (Halden)
Ranheim	0–1	Ørn (Trondheim)
Rapid	2–0	Aasen
Rjukan	2–4	Skiens Grane
Sandaker	0–1 (a.e.t.)	Geithus
Skiens BK	2–1	Strong
Skiold	1–3	Sarpsborg
Skreia	3–2	Raufoss
Sparta (Drammen)	1–2	Jevnaker
Sparta (Sarpsborg)	2–1	Grei
Start	3–1	AIK Lund
Stavanger	2–4	Jarl
Sverre	1–4 (a.e.t.)	Kvik (Trondheim)
Ulefoss	1–0 (a.e.t.)	Storm
Urædd	2–1 (a.e.t.)	Falk
Vard	2–0	Stord
Verdal	5–2	Marienberg
Vigør	1–2	Jerv
Vikersund	1–1 (a.e.t.)	Tønsberg Turn
Volda	1–4	Rollon
Voss	0–1	Minde
Vålerengen	6–1	Bjørkelangen
Wing	2–2 (a.e.t.)	Neset
Ørn (Horten)	4–1	Reidulf
Aalesund	2–0	Ørsta
Ålgård	4–0	Trygg (Stavanger)
Årstad	5–2	Pallas-Høyden
Replay
Fremad Lillehammer	4–2	Asker
Neset	1–2	Wing
Rosenborg	1–2	Lyn (Trondheim)
Strømmen	2–1	Askim
Tønsberg Turn	4–0	Vikersund

== Second round ==
Team 1	Score	Team 2
Borg	1–4	Rapid
Brann	2–1	Vard
Clausenengen	3–1	Aalesund
Drammens BK	3–1	Skiens BK
Falken (Trondheim)	1–0	Wing
Flekkefjord	0–2	Ålgård
Freidig	4–0	Verdal
Fremad Lillehammer	2–1	Lyn (Trondheim)
Frigg	2–0	Kapp
Geithus	0–3	Fredrikstad
Gjøvik-Lyn	2–1 (a.e.t.)	Vålerengen
Hamar	0–3	Lyn
Jarl	3–1	Djerv
Jevnaker	2–0	Sparta (Sarpsborg)
Kongsberg	1–0	Urædd
Kvik (Trondheim)	2–0 (a.e.t.)	Ørn (Trondheim)
Larvik Turn	5–1	B.14
Minde	1–7	Årstad
Mjøndalen	3–1	Lillestrøm
Moss	1–2	Rakkestad
Rollon	1–3	Kristiansund
Sandefjord BK	2–0	Kjelsås
Sarpsborg	4–0	Mysen
Selbak	2–2 (a.e.t.)	Fram (Larvik)
Skeid	5–0	Skreia
Skiens Grane	1–4	Jordal
Start	2–3	Jerv
Steinkjer	2–0	National
Strømmen	1–3	Lisleby
Tønsberg Turn	1–0	Birkebeineren
Viking	7–0	Nymark
Ørn (Horten)	4–0	Ulefoss
Replay
Fram (Larvik)	0–3	Selbak

== Third round ==
Team 1	Score	Team 2
17 August 1947
Lisleby	0–4	Ørn (Horten)
Fredrikstad	8–2	Jevnaker
Rapid	1–3	Mjøndalen
Lyn	12–0	Falken (Trondheim)
Jordal	0–5	Sarpsborg
Fremad Lillehamer	1–2 (a.e.t.)	Kvik (Trondheim)
Drammens BK	2–5	Brann
Kongsberg	2–2 (a.e.t.)	Selbak
Tønsberg Turn	1–2	Skeid
Sandefjord BK	2–1 (a.e.t.)	Rakkestad
Larvik Turn	3–0 (a.e.t.)	Jerv
Viking	4–0	Gjøvik-Lyn
Ålgård	1–1 (a.e.t.)	Frigg
Årstad	4–1	Jarl
Kristiansund	2–3	Steinkjer
Freidig	3–1	Clausenengen
Replay: 24 August 1947
Selbak	1–0	Kongsberg
Frigg	2–1	Ålgård

== Fourth round ==
Team 1	Score	Team 2
31 August 1947
Sarpsborg	7–1	Ørn (Horten)
Fredrikstad	2–1	Frigg
Skeid	5–4 (a.e.t.)	Freidig
Selbak	3–2	Sandefjord BK
Mjøndalen	2–1	Larvik Turn
Viking	6–0	Årstad
Brann	4–0	Lyn
Kvik (Trondheim)	4–0	Steinkjer

== Quarter-finals ==
Team 1	Score	Team 2
14 September 1947
Sarpsborg	3–2 (Note: Played at Bislett Stadion in Oslo.)	Kvik (Trondheim)
Fredrikstad	0–1	Skeid
Brann	0–1	Viking
Mjøndalen	2–0 (Note: Played in Tønsberg.)	Selbak

== Semi-finals ==
Team 1	Score	Team 2
28 September 1947
Mjøndalen	1–1 (a.e.t.)	Viking
Skeid	3–0	Sarpsborg
Replay: 12 October 1947
Viking	3–2	Mjøndalen

== Final ==
19 October 1947
13:00 CET (UTC+1)

Skeid	2–0	Viking
Nordahl 30'; Sæthrang 90'	Report

Brann Stadion, Bergen
Attendance: 25,000
Referee: Bjarne Halvorsen (Skiold)

Skeid (2-3-5):

Petter Due - Sigurd Smestad, Gustav Rehn - Knut Andersen, John Bøhling, Willy Sundblad - Henry Mathiesen, Brede Borgen, Hans Nordahl, Paul Sætrang, Kjell Anker Hanssen

Viking (2-3-5):

Torgeir Torgersen - Karsten Johannessen, Tonning Skjæveland - Arthur Wilsgård, Thore Thu, Lauritz Abrahamsen - Inge Paulsen, Gunnar Stensland, Ragnar Paulsen, William Danielsen, Georg Monsen

== See also ==
- 1947 in Norwegian football
