= 1933 Norwegian Football Cup =

Norgesmesterskapet i fotball for menn 1933

Tournament details
- Country: Norway
- Teams: 128 (main competition)

Final positions
- Champions: Mjøndalen (1st title)
- Runners-up: Viking

The 1933 Norwegian Football Cup was the 32nd season of the Norwegian annual knockout football tournament. The tournament was open for all members of NFF, except those from Northern Norway. The final was played at Ullevaal Stadion in Oslo on 15 October 1933, and Mjøndalen secured their first title with a 3–1 win against Viking. Mjøndalen had previously played two cup finals but lost both in 1924 and 1931, while Viking played their first final. Fredrikstad were the defending champions, but were eliminated by Viking in the fourth round.

== Rounds and dates ==
- First round: 6 August
- Second round: 13 August
- Third round: 27 August
- Fourth round: 10 September
- Quarter-finals: 17 September
- Semi-finals: 1 October
- Final: 15 October

== First round ==
Team 1	Score	Team 2
Årstad	0–6	Viking
Berger	2–0	Skeid
Bergmann	2–5	Brage
Birkebeineren	3–4	Geithus
Blink	4–4 (a.e.t.)	Freidig
Braatt	1–7	Aalesund
Brevik	1–4	Pors
Briskebyen	5–2	Trysilgutten
Brodd	0–10	Brann
Bygdø BK	1–2	Torp
Bøn	2–0	Grue
Drafn	6–2	Fredensborg
Dæhlenengen	3–1	Sparta Drammen
Falk	1–1 (a.e.t.)	Rolvsøy
Flekkefjord	3–0	Jarl
Fossekallen	1–2	Lyn (Gjøvik)
Fredrikstad	6–0	Greåker
Fremad Lillehammer	2–0	Eidsvold IF
Gleng	0–4	Ørn
Grane (Arendal)	2–5	Donn
Grane (Sandvika)	2–5	Gjøa
Haga	1–3	Lillestrøm
Hardy	4–0	Fjellkameratene
Holmestrand	1–5	Lisleby
Høyanger	1–2	Djerv
Kapp	2–3	Jevnaker
Kristiansund	1–0	Clausenengen
Kvik (Halden)	5–1	Gresvik
Kvik (Trondheim)	2–1	Neset
Larvik Turn	3–2	Skiens-Grane
Lilleaker	1–2	Skiold
Lyn	9–0	Magnor
Mandal	0–1	Vigør
Mjøndalen	10–0	Skiens BK
Moss	7–0	Strømmen BK
Namsos	0–1	Steinkjer
Nordstrand	0–3	Strong
Norrøna (Strømmen)	0–6	Vålerengen
Nydalen	4–0	Kongsvinger
Orkanger	4–2	National
Rapp	0–2	Ranheim
Raufoss	9–0	Raumnes & Årnes
Rjukan	2–1	Borg
Rollon	3–1	Guard
Roy (Hurum)	1–0	Drammens BK
Sandefjord BK	0–5	Sarpsborg
Sander	2–3	Hamar
Selbak	7–0	Kjelsås
Ski	3–1	Tistedalen
Snøgg	5–2	Tønsberg-Kameratene
Spring (Kragerø)	1–4	Odd
Stabæk	3–1	Solberg
Start	4–0	Vennesla
Stavanger	4–2	Vard
Storm	2–0	Kongsberg
Strømsgodset	3–1	Eiker
Sverre	12–0	Verdal
Tønsberg Turn	2–0	BSK av 1914
Ulf	2–4	Egersund
Ullensaker	0–5	Frigg
Urædd	2–0	Kragerø
Vardal	1–3	Liv
Vestfossen	1–6	Fram (Larvik)
Voss	1–2	Ny-Solheim
Replay
Freidig	6–1	Blink
Rolvsøy	3–1 (a.e.t.)	Falk

== Second round ==
Team 1	Score	Team 2
Aalesund	4–2	Nydalen
Brage	8–1	Sverre
Brann	6–0	Ny-Solheim
Djerv	4–3	Rollon
Donn	0–1	Mjøndalen
Egersund	1–7	Stavanger
Fram (Larvik)	8–0	Roy (Hurum)
Fremad Lillehammer	4–2	Strømsgodset
Frigg	3–2 (a.e.t.)	Rjukan
Geithus	1–1 (a.e.t.)	Drafn
Gjøa	2–2 (a.e.t.)	Fredrikstad
Lyn (Gjøvik)	6–0	Strong
Hamar	4–2	Kvik (Halden)
Jevnaker	2–0	Dæhlenengen
Kristiansund	9–0	Orkanger
Larvik Turn	1–3	Lyn
Lillestrøm	3–0	Ski
Lisleby	4–1	Raufoss
Liv	2–1	Hardy
Odd	6–1	Start
Ørn	7–0	Bøn
Pors	1–1 (a.e.t.)	Moss
Ranheim	0–1	Freidig
Rolvsøy	0–2	Urædd
Sarpsborg	5–0	Briskebyen
Skiold	3–2	Snøgg
Steinkjer	0–3	Kvik (Trondheim)
Torp	5–4	Stabæk
Tønsberg Turn	2–4	Selbak
Vigør	0–1	Storm
Vålerengen	4–2	Berger
Viking	3–1	Flekkefjord
Replay
Drafn	3–1	Geithus
Fredrikstad	4–2	Gjøa
Moss	0–2	Pors

== Third round ==
Team 1	Score	Team 2
Aalesund	0–2	Fremad Lillehammer
Djerv	1–6	Lisleby
Drafn	2–1	Brage
Fredrikstad	5–1	Kristiansund
Freidig	2–3	Vålerengen
Lyn (Gjøvik)	2–2 (a.e.t.)	Jevnaker
Hamar	1–7	Sarpsborg
Kvik (Trondheim)	2–0	Lillestrøm
Lyn	8–1	Liv
Mjøndalen	4–1	Torp
Ørn	3–3 (a.e.t.)	Pors
Selbak	0–2	Fram (Larvik)
Skiold	0–2	Brann
Stavanger	2–2 (a.e.t.)	Odd
Storm	2–7 (a.e.t.)	Viking
Urædd	3–2	Frigg
Replay
Jevnaker	2–0	Lyn (Gjøvik)
Odd	4–1	Stavanger
Pors	0–0 (a.e.t.)	Ørn
2nd replay
Ørn	4–1	Pors

== Fourth round ==
Team 1	Score	Team 2
Brann	1–3	Lyn
Fram (Larvik)	5–1	Jevnaker
Fremad Lillehammer	0–7	Mjøndalen
Lisleby	3–4	Urædd
Odd	1–3	Drafn
Sarpsborg	2–1 (a.e.t.)	Kvik (Trondheim)
Vålerengen	0–4	Ørn
Viking	3–2 (a.e.t.)	Fredrikstad

== Quarter-finals ==
Team 1	Score	Team 2
Drafn	4–2	Fram (Larvik)
Lyn	3–1	Ørn
Mjøndalen	5–0 (Note: Played in Sandefjord.)	Urædd
Viking	3–1 (Note: Played in Bergen.)	Sarpsborg

== Semi-finals ==
Team 1	Score	Team 2
Drafn	2–5	Mjøndalen
Viking	3–2 (a.e.t.)	Lyn

== Final ==
15 October 1933
13:00 CET (UTC+1)

Mjøndalen	3–1	Viking
E. Andersen 10', 33'; S. Andersen 42'	Report	Kvammen 70'

Ullevaal Stadion, Oslo
Attendance: 23,000
Referee: Eivind Johansen (Larvik Turn)

Mjøndalen's winning team: Sverre Nordby, Oscar Skjønberg, Hans Andersen, Arthur Simensen, Fritz Hansen, Bjarne Pettersen, Sigurd Andersen, Einar Andersen, Jørgen Hval, Trygve Halvorsen, Arthur Andersen.

== See also ==
- 1933 in Norwegian football
