= 1926 Norwegian Football Cup =

Norgesmesterskapet i fotball for menn 1926

Tournament details
- Country: Norway
- Teams: 110

Final positions
- Champions: Odd (10th title)
- Runners-up: Ørn

The 1926 Norwegian Football Cup was the 25th season of the Norwegian annual knockout football tournament. The tournament was open for all members of NFF, except those from Northern Norway. Odd won their 10th title, having beaten Ørn in the final. Brann were the defending champions, but were eliminated by Urædd in the quarterfinal.

== First round ==
Team 1	Score	Team 2
Bergmann	1–8	Tynset
Brann	11–0	Brodd
Bygdø	1–2	Gjøa
Djerv	3–1	Hardy
Donn	5–2	Vigør
Eidsvold	1–5	Frigg
Fagfor. IL, Hamar	2–6	Vaalerengen
Falk	1–3	Mjøndalen
Flekkefjord	2–2 (a.e.t.)	Ulf, Sandnes
Fram	6–1	Lyn
Fremad	2–3	Dokken
Fremad Filtvedt	3–8	Drøbak IF
Gjeithus	1–1 (a.e.t.)	Haugsund
Gjøvik-Lyn	7–1	Mercantile
Hødd	1–5	Aalesund
Jessheim	1–0	Bøn
Kampørn	0–4	Drafn
Kongsberg	1–2	Snøgg
Kongsvinger	3–0	Fet
Kragerø	1–8	Urædd
Kristiansund	2–1	Braatt
Kraakstad	0–5	Lisleby
Kvik (Fredrikshald)	5–2	Drammens BK
Kvik (Trondhjem)	13–0	Blink
Lillestrøm	3–6	Ready
Liv	3–2	Hadelands-Kvik
Moss	8–0	Hølen
Nordstrand	1–16	Strømsgodset
Norrøna	1–4 (a.e.t.)	Torp
Odd	10–0	Agnes
Pors	9–2	Tønsberg Turn
Ranheim	2–1	Freidig
Rapp	2–4	Nesset
Rollon	4–0	Molde
Roy	3–3 (a.e.t.)	Ekeberg
Sandefjord	1–0	Vikersund
Skiold	2–4	Fredrikstad
Skotfos	2–1	Rjukan
Solbergelven	4–5	Holmestrand
Stabæk	2–7	Ørn
Stange	1–0	Brumunddal
Start	1–3	Grane
Stavanger IF	5–0	Vidar
Sverre	4–3 (a.e.t.)	Namsos
Stenkjær	2–6	Brage
Strinden	3–3 (a.e.t.)	Tryggkameratene
Ski	6–1	Hafslund
Tell	2–2 (a.e.t.)	Ulefos
Trygg	0–9	Sarpsborg
Trysilgutten	0–12	Hamar
Tønsberg-Kameratene	2–6	Storm
Vard	5–0	Stord
Voss	2–1 (a.e.t.)	Minde
Østsiden FK	6–1	Hasle
Larvik Turn	Bye	
Viking	Bye	
Replay
Haugsund	2–4	Gjeithus
Strinden	4–2	Tryggkameratene
Ulefos	5–1	Tell
Ulf, Sandnes	1–0	Flekkefjord

== Second round ==
Team 1	Score	Team 2
Brann	7–3	Vard
Brage	6–2	Kristiansund
Dokken	1–3	Gjøvik-Lyn
Drafn	10–0	Jessheim
Fredrikstad	8–1	Ski
Frigg	3–2	Djerv
Grane	2–3	Pors
Hamar	3–0	Stange
Holmestrand	3–1	Ekeberg
Kongsvinger	0–3	Gjøa
Larvik Turn	9–0	Gjeithus
Lisleby	0–2 (a.e.t.)	Fram
Liv	0–4	Strømsgodset
Mjøndalen	7–2	Skotfos
Moss	7–0	Drøbak IF
Nesset	4–1	Sverre
Sandefjord	1–3	Kvik (Fredrikshald)
Sarpsborg	3–2	Torp
Snøgg	0–7	Odd
Stavanger IF	7–0	Ulf, Sandnes
Storm	5–1	Ulefos
Strinden	5–5 (a.e.t.)	Ranheim
Tynset	0–7	Kvik (Trondhjem)
Urædd	4–1	Donn
Voss	0–5	Viking
Vaalerengen	5–3	Rollon
Ørn	6–0	Østsiden FK
Aalesund	4–0	Ready
Replay
Ekeberg	5–2	Roy
Strinden	1–4	Ranheim

== Third round ==
Team 1	Score	Team 2
Brage	2–1	Ranheim
Brann	4–1	Gjøvik-Lyn
Fram	1–0	Sarpsborg
Fredrikstad	6–0	Vaalerengen
Gjøa	4–2	Stavanger IF
Hamar	4–2	Nesset
Kvik (Trondhjem)	0–3	Drafn
Moss	2–0	Kvik (Fredrikshald)
Odd	5–0	Holmestrand
Pors	1–3	Larvik Turn
Storm	3–0	Frigg
Strømsgodset	2–2 (a.e.t.)	Urædd
Viking	0–0 (a.e.t.)	Mjøndalen
Ørn	5–0	Aalesund
Replay
Mjøndalen	7–1	Viking
Urædd	2–0	Strømsgodset

== Fourth round ==
Team 1	Score	Team 2
Brage	0–2 (a.e.t.)	Fredrikstad
Larvik Turn	0–5	Drafn
Moss	2–1	Fram
Storm	1–1 (a.e.t.)	Gjøa
Urædd	3–1	Mjøndalen
Ørn	5–1	Hamar
Brann	Bye	
Odd	Bye	
Replay
Gjøa	0–1	Storm

== Quarter-finals ==
Team 1	Score	Team 2
Drafn	1–0 (a.e.t.)	Fredrikstad
Storm	1–2	Odd
Urædd	1–0	Brann
Ørn	2–0 (a.e.t.)	Moss

== Semi-finals ==
Team 1	Score	Team 2
Drafn	1–2	Ørn
Odd	2–2 (a.e.t.)	Urædd
Replay
Urædd	0–3	Odd

== Final ==
17 October 1926

Odd	3–0	Ørn
Ulrichsen 14', 30', 55'	Report

Ullevaal Stadion, Oslo
Attendance: 16,000
Referee: Finn Grefberg (Frigg)

== See also ==
- 1926 in Norwegian football
