= 1960 Norwegian Football Cup =

Norgesmesterskapet i fotball for menn 1960

Tournament details
- Country: Norway
- Teams: 128 (main competition)

Final positions
- Champions: Rosenborg (1st title)
- Runners-up: Odd

The 1960 Norwegian Football Cup was the 55th season of the Norwegian annual knockout football tournament. The tournament was open for all members of NFF, except those from Northern Norway. Viking was the defending champions, but was eliminated by the second-tier team Freidig in the fourth round.

The final was contested by the eleven-time former winners Odd and the second-tier team Rosenborg who made their debut in the Norwegian Cup final. This year's final needed a rematch to decide a winner, as the first match ended with a 3–3 draw. The result after full time in the second match was 1–1, but after extra time Rosenborg had won 3-2 and could celebrate the clubs first Norwegian Cup trophy.

== First round ==
| Team 1 | Score | Team 2 |
|---|---|---|
| Egersund | 1–1 (a.e.t.) | Viking |
| Ulf | 3–2 | Vidar |
| Djerv 1919 | 2–1 | Kopervik |
| Haugar | 3–1 | Bryne |
| Odda | 0–2 | Vard |
| Stavanger | 5–0 | Flekkefjord |
| Sarpsborg | 4–0 | Borgen |
| Greåker | 4–1 | Navestad |
| Moss | 6–1 | Gresvik |
| Asker | 5–0 | Sterling |
| Liull | 0–2 | Fredrikstad |
| Vålerengen | 5–0 | Kjelsås |
| Sagene | 3–1 | Røa |
| Frigg | 9–0 | Åsen |
| Mesna | 0–3 | Kapp |
| Åssiden | 3–1 | Sandaker |
| Strømsgodset | 1–2 | Mjøndalen |
| Svelvik | 4–2 (a.e.t.) | Rapid |
| Falk | 0–4 | Fram (Larvik) |
| Sandefjord BK | 8–0 | Borre |
| Larvik Turn | 9–1 | Brevik |
| Storm | 1–5 | Pors |
| Grane (Arendal) | 0–2 | Skiens-Grane |
| Vindbjart | 5–4 (a.e.t.) | Vigør |
| Donn | 0–2 | Start |
| Nordnes | 1–2 (a.e.t.) | Erdal |
| Varegg | 1–0 | Fana |
| Os | 2–2 (a.e.t.) | Nymark |
| Herd | 3–2 | Aalesund |
| Skarbøvik | 5–3 | Hødd |
| Træff | 0–6 | Molde |
| Braatt | 5–3 | Langevåg |
| Kristiansund | 2–1 | Clausenengen |
| Framtid | 1–2 | Freidig |
| Brage | 2–1 | Ranheim |
| Stjørdals-Blink | 1–2 | Rosenborg |
| Fram (Skatval) | 0–6 | Steinkjer |
| Kvik (Trondheim) | 2–1 | Fremad |
| Neset | 2–3 | Sverre |
| Nessegutten | 2–0 | Verdal |
| Gjøvik-Lyn | 7–0 | Hamar |
| Raufoss | 3–1 | Jotun |
| Nybergsund | 1–2 | Gjøvik SK |
| Kongsvinger | 1–2 | Lyn |
| Ski | 1–0 | Selbak |
| Vestfossen | 3–0 | Hokksund |
| Årstad | 1–0 | Djerv |
| Sogndal | 1–0 | Sandviken |
| Tønsberg Turn | 0–5 | Odd |
| Urædd | 7–0 | Ørn |
| Heddal | 1–6 | Snøgg |
| Liv/Fossekallen | 1–2 | Lillestrøm |
| Spartacus | 0–3 | Skeid |
| Strømmen | 3–1 | Grue |
| Askim | 1–3 | Sparta |
| Lisleby | 3–1 | Hugin |
| Aurskog | 4–2 | Sprint/Jeløy |
| HamKam | 5–0 | Tynset |
| Sørfjell | 7–0 | Risør |
| Jerv | 2–1 | Nedenes |
| Geithus | 2–1 | Birkebeineren |
| Langesund | 0–3 | Runar |
| Herkules | 1–3 | Eik |
| Brann | 5–0 | Hardy |
Replay
| Nymark | 1–3 | Os |
| Viking | 7–0 | Egersund |

== Second round ==
| Team 1 | Score | Team 2 |
|---|---|---|
| Viking | 1–0 | Djerv 1919 |
| Vard | 3–1 | Haugar |
| Ulf | 2–0 | Stavanger |
| Lisleby | 6–0 | Ski |
| Moss | 2–0 | Gjøvik-Lyn |
| Jerv | 4–13 | Larvik Turn |
| Eik | 5–6 (a.e.t.) | Vestfossen |
| Sparta | 0–4 | Frigg |
| Asker | 0–1 | Raufoss |
| Fram (Larvik) | 2–2 (a.e.t.) | Sørfjell |
| Start | 1–1 (a.e.t.) | Vindbjart |
| Lillestrøm | 2–1 | Sagene |
| Kapp | 6–3 | Vålerengen |
| Sverre | 4–4 (a.e.t.) | Kvik (Trondheim) |
| Skiens-Grane | 0–0 (a.e.t.) | Sandefjord BK |
| Årstad | 2–1 | Varegg |
| Skeid | 5–1 | Geithus |
| Lyn | 5–1 | HamKam |
| Os | 7–0 | Erdal |
| Freidig | 1–0 | Nessegutten |
| Steinkjer | 2–0 | Brage |
| Fredrikstad | 7–0 | Aurskog |
| Mjøndalen | 7–0 | Urædd |
| Brann | 3–1 | Sogndal |
| Pors | 5–0 | Svelvik |
| Herd | 1–2 | Braatt |
| Molde | 0–1 | Kristiansund |
| Rosenborg | 9–3 | Skarbøvik |
| Gjøvik SK | 1–4 | Strømmen |
| Odd | 0–0 (a.e.t.) | Åssiden |
| Snøgg | 1–5 | Greåker |
| Runar | 1–1 (a.e.t.) | Sarpsborg |
Replay
| Åssiden | 2–5 | Odd |
| Kvik (Trondheim) | 3–2 | Sverre |
| Sandefjord BK | 4–1 | Skiens-Grane |
| Sarpsborg | 4–3 | Runar |
| Sørfjell | 1–3 | Fram (Larvik) |

== Third round ==
| Team 1 | Score | Team 2 |
|---|---|---|
14 August 1960
| Sarpsborg | 1–0 | Lillestrøm |
| Greåker | 2–5 | Mjøndalen |
| Frigg | 1–1 (a.e.t.) | Rosenborg |
| Strømmen | 4–2 | Fram (Larvik) |
| Raufoss | 2–3 | Freidig |
| Vestfossen | 2–4 | Lyn |
| Sandefjord BK | 3–0 | Pors |
| Larvik Turn | 4–0 | Ulf |
| Odd | 4–1 | Moss |
| Start | 0–2 | Fredrikstad |
| Viking | 1–0 | Os |
| Vard | 0–2 | Brann |
| Årstad | 2–3 | Lisleby |
| Braatt | 0–3 | Kristiansund |
| Kvik (Trondheim) | 3–1 | Skeid |
| Steinkjer | 3–2 | Kapp |
Replay: 24 August 1960
| Rosenborg | 2–0 | Frigg |

== Fourth round ==
| Team 1 | Score | Team 2 |
|---|---|---|
4 September 1960
| Fredrikstad | 2–2 (a.e.t.) | Steinkjer |
| Freidig | 2–1 | Viking |
| Lisleby | 2–1 | Kvik (Trondheim) |
| Kristiansund | 2–6 | Strømmen |
| Brann | 1–4 | Sandefjord BK |
| Mjøndalen | 2–2 (a.e.t.) | Odd |
| Lyn | 0–1 | Sarpsborg |
| Rosenborg | 3–2 | Larvik Turn |
Replay: 7 September 1960
| Odd | 3–2 | Mjøndalen |
Replay: 14 September 1960
| Steinkjer | 0–2 | Fredrikstad |

== Quarter-finals ==
| Team 1 | Score | Team 2 |
|---|---|---|
25 September 1960
| Rosenborg | 4–1 | Lisleby |
| Sandefjord BK | 3–0 | Sarpsborg |
| Strømmen | 1–1 (a.e.t.) | Odd |
| Fredrikstad | 4–0 | Freidig |
Replay: 2 October 1960
| Odd | 2–1 | Strømmen |

== Semi-finals ==
9 October 1960

| Sandefjord BK | 0–4 | Rosenborg |
|---|---|---|
| | | Rønnes 53' (pen.), 60'; Fornes 75'; Hansen 82' |

Storstadion, Sandefjord
Attendance: 8,000
Referee: Birger Nilsen

9 October 1960

| Odd | 2–0 | Fredrikstad |
|---|---|---|
| Skau 36', 65' |

Odd Stadion, Skien
Attendance: 8,500
Referee: Leif Gulliksen

== Final ==
=== First match ===
23 October 1960
13:15 CET (UTC+1)

| Odd | 3–3 (a.e.t.) | Rosenborg |
|---|---|---|
| Jacobsen 30'; Ødegaard 35' (pen.); Larsen 117' | Report | Hansen 42', 75', 108' |

Ullevaal Stadion, Oslo
Attendance: 31,135
Referee: Harald Heltberg (Frigg)

=== Replay match ===
30 October 1960
13:15 CET (UTC+1)

| Rosenborg | 3–2 (a.e.t.) | Odd |
|---|---|---|
| Hansen 30', 109'; Fornes 103' | Report | Ødegaard 61'; Larsen 106' |

Ullevaal Stadion, Oslo
Attendance: 29,743
Referee: Arnold Nilsen (Nymark)

== See also ==
- 1959–60 Norwegian Main League
- 1960 in Norwegian football
