= Norwegian Football Cup =

- Founded: 1902; 124 years ago
- Region: Norway
- Teams: 272 (2020)
- Qualifier for: UEFA Europa League
- Domestic cup: Mesterfinalen
- Current champions: Bodø/Glimt (3rd title)
- Most championships: Odd; Rosenborg; Fredrikstad (12 titles)
- Broadcaster: TV 2
- Website: NM Men
- 2025–26 Norwegian Football Cup

The Norwegian Football Cup (Norwegian: Norgesmesterskapet i fotball for herrer) is the main knockout cup competition in Norwegian football. It is run by the Football Association of Norway and has been contested since 1902, making it the oldest football tournament in the country. The tournament is commonly known as Cupen ("The Cup"), NM or NM Cup (NM Cupen), an acronym formed from Norgesmesterskap ("Norwegian Championship"). These terms are used to describe both the men's and women's competitions. The equivalent competition for women's teams is the Norwegian Women's Football Cup.

The Norwegian Football Cup is a national championship, meaning that while the Eliteserien may be the most prestigious competition to win, it is the winners of the Cup who are awarded the title "Norwegian football champions". This differs from, for example, English football, where the winners of the Premier League are the ones who become English champions.

Winners receive the King's trophy. Winners also qualify for the Europa League second qualifying round. The current Norwegian champions and holders of the cup are Lillestrøm, who defeated Sarpsborg 08 3-1 in the 2025 final. Odd, Fredrikstad and Rosenborg are the most successful clubs with 12 titles each.

== History ==
The first cup was played in 1902, and Oscar II presented the King's Cup to the inaugural tournament. This was an invitation tournament organised by Kristiania IF and the Norwegian Football Association, which was later given official status. Five teams joined the competition, and Odd reached the final without playing a match. Grane won the first Norwegian Cup after they defeated Odd 2–0 at Gamle Frogner Stadion, Kristiania. The first tournament who had official status at the time of the events was the 1904 Norwegian Cup and was won by Odd. In the beginning, the cup was open for county champions only. This continued until 1917, when the cup was opened for all clubs of a certain standing. League football began with the 1937–38 season, and Fredrikstad became the first team to win a domestic double by winning both the league and the cup in the same year. Due to the outbreak of World War II, the competition was not played between the 1940 and 1945 editions. The competition was not nationwide until 1963. 1963 was the first year clubs from Northern Norway were allowed to participate, this was due to a poor communication system in the northern parts of Norway and to the belief that the clubs in the three northern counties could not compete on the same level as the southern clubs (Bodø/Glimt – one of the two northern newcomers – did stay in the cup to the fourth round that year). Until 1963, teams from Northern Norway competed in their own Northern Norwegian Championships, including the Northern Norwegian Cup.

Before the 2004 cup final, NRK awarded the 1986 final between Tromsø and Lillestrøm with the title Tidenes Cupfinale (Best cup final ever), and ex-Rosenborg striker Gøran Sørloth with Tidenes Cuphelt (Best cup hero ever).

The final has been played at Ullevaal Stadion since the 1948 cup final.

== Format ==
=== Overview ===
Before the proper rounds take place, two qualifying rounds are played in March and April. As of the 2025 edition, all non-reserve clubs from tiers 1 (Eliteserien), 2 (OBOS-ligaen), and 3 (PostNord-ligaen) enter in the First Round, in sharp contrast to some other countries' main cups such as the FA Cup and Coupe de France where teams enter much more gradually. The top 4 teams in each of the 6 areas of the Norwegian Third Division also enter in the First Round, as do an additional few teams placed 5th and possibly below in order to replace ineligible reserve teams to reach a total of 84 eligible teams.

176 clubs from tier 4, 5, and 6 enter the first qualifying round and 44 of these advance to the first round where they are joined by the above-mentioned First Round-entering teams.

The first round of the cup are played in April, around the same time as the Eliteserien season starts. The first two rounds are set up by the Norwegian Football Association, where the top teams are under normal circumstance drawn automatically away against fairly weak amateur teams, often from the same counties or areas as the top teams. Early upsets, where an amateur team knocks a professional team out of the tournament do happen occasionally. For example, in 2012 the Eliteserien teams Sandnes Ulf and Sogndal were knocked out in the first round by the Norwegian Third Division (fourth tier) teams Staal Jørpeland IL and Florø SK respectively. Even if the amateur team loses, squaring off against a professional team may well be the highlight of their season.

From the third round to the semi-final, matchups and hostings are drawn at random, all matchups are single matches, and the winner goes on to the next round. The final match is played at Ullevaal Stadium (national stadium) in November or December, and takes place near the end of the Norwegian football season, as no significant domestic competitions take place in January or February.

The cup is very popular in Norway, and tickets for the final match are hard to get hold of, as the game usually sells out quickly. The supporters of the two teams playing in the final match are seated at the two short-ends of the pitch, while the more neutral supporters are seated by the long-ends. The match is also televised on national television.

=== Schedule ===
The months in which rounds are played are traditional, with exact dates subject to each year's calendar.

Round	New entrants at this round	Month	No of matches
Qualifying Competition
First Qualifying Round	Level 5, 6, and most 4 clubs	March	88
Second Qualifying Round	(none)	April	44
Competition Proper
First Round	Level 1, 2, 3, and some 4 clubs	April	64
Second Round	(none)	May	32
Third Round	(none)	May	16
Fourth Round	(none)	June	8
Quarter-finals	(none)	August	4
Semi-finals	(none)	September	2
Final	(none)	December	1

=== Tiebreaking ===
In all rounds, if a fixture result in a draw after normal time, the winner is settled by a period of extra time, and if still necessary, a penalty shootout. Earlier, fixtures resulting in a draw (after normal time) would go to a replay, played at the venue of the away team.

The first Cup Final to go to a replay was the 1945 final, between Lyn and Fredrikstad. The initial tie finished 1–1 and the first replay also finished 1–1. Lyn won the second replay 4–0. The only other time the final has taken three matches to settle was the 1965 final between Oslo rivals Skeid and Frigg (2–2, 1–1, 2–1). The last replayed final was the 1995 final, when Rosenborg and Brann fought a 1–1 draw. The replay saw Rosenborg win the Cup, with the score 3–1. The first final to be decided by a penalty shootout was the 2009 final between Molde and Aalesund. The score ended 1–1 after normal time and 2–2 after extra time. Aalesund won the final 5–4 on penalties.

== Qualification for subsequent competitions ==
=== European football ===
Prior to 2020, the Cup winners qualified for the following season's UEFA Europa League (formerly named the UEFA Cup; from its launch in 1960 until 1998, they entered the now-defunct UEFA Cup Winners' Cup instead). After the creation of the UEFA Conference League, the Norwegian Cup winners from 2020 onwards qualified for that competition instead, until they returned to qualifying for the UEFA Europa League from the 2023 Norwegian Cup again due to Eliteserien's heightened UEFA coefficients.

This European place applies even if the team is relegated or is not in the Norwegian top flight; for instance, Hødd played in the 2013–14 UEFA Europa League qualifiers despite last having played in the top flight in 1995.

In the past, if the Cup winning team also qualified for the following season's Champions League or Europa League through their league position, then the losing Cup finalist were given this European berth instead. Norwegian Cup winners enter the Europa League at the second qualifying round. Losing finalists, if they hadn't qualified for Europe via the league, began earlier, at the first qualifying round. From the 2015–16 UEFA Europa League season, however, UEFA does not allow the runners-up to qualify for the Europa League through the competition.

If the winner – and until 2015, the runner-up - has already qualified for Europe through their league position (with the exception of the UEFA Cup until 1998), the Cup berth is then given to the highest-place team in the league who has not yet qualified.

== Finals ==
=== Key ===
(R)	Replay
*	Match went to extra time
†	Match decided by a penalty shootout after extra time
**Bold**	Winning team won **The Double** of Norwegian Cup & top division
Italics	Team from outside the top level of Norwegian football

Season	Winner	Score	Runner-up	Referee	Venue	Att.
1902	Grane	2–0	Odd	Bredo Larsen (Lyn Oslo)	Gamle Frogner stadion, Kristiania	
1903	Odd	1–0	Grane	Finn Hagemann (Lyn Oslo)	Gamle Frogner stadion, Kristiania	
1904	Odd	4–0	Porsgrunds FC	Thomas Wiborg (Kragerø IF Turn)	Skien Sportsplassen, Skien	800
1905	Odd	2–1	Akademisk	Arthur Nordlie (Lyn Oslo)	Gamle Frogner stadion, Kristiania	3,000
1906	Odd	1–0	Sarpsborg	Sverre Strand, (SK Grane)	Gamle Frogner stadion, Kristiania	
1907	Mercantile	3–0	Sarpsborg	August Heiberg Kahrs (Lyn Oslo)	Nedre Frednes, Porsgrunn	4,000
1908	Lyn	3–2	Odd	Charles Stanley Davis (Sarpsborg FK)	Gamle Frogner stadion, Kristiania	
1909	Lyn	4 – 3 *	Odd	Christian Wiese (Akademisk FK)	Gamle Frogner stadion, Kristiania	4,000
1910	Lyn	4–2	Odd	Theodor Hansen (Fredrikstad FK)	Gamle Frogner stadion, Kristiania	5,000
1911	Lyn	5–2	Urædd	Ruben Gelbord, (Stockholm, Sweden)	Gamle Frogner stadion, Kristiania	5,000
1912	Mercantile	6–0	Fram	Tryggve Lund, (Odd BK)	Gamle Frogner stadion, Kristiania	2,000
1913	Odd	2–1	Mercantile	Ruben Gelbord, (Stockholm, Sweden)	Urædd stadion, Porsgrunn	10,000
1914	Frigg	4–2	Gjøvik-Lyn	Daniel Eie (Lyn Oslo)	Frogner stadion, Kristiania	10,000
1915	Odd	2–1	Kvik Fredrikshald	Peder Christian Andersen, (Kristiania)	Sarpsborg stadion, Sarpsborg	6,000
1916	Frigg	2–0	Ørn	Peder Christian Andersen, (Kristiania)	Skøitebanen, Trondheim	4,000
1917	Sarpsborg	4–1	Brann	Arne Wendelborg, (Frigg Oslo)	Stavanger stadion, Stavanger	10,000
1918	Kvik Fredrikshald	4–0	Brann	Ragnvald Smedvik, (Frigg Oslo)	Marienlyst stadion, Drammen	12,000
1919	Odd	1–0	Frigg	Peder Christian Andersen, (Kristiania)	Fram sportsplass, Larvik	10,000
1920	Ørn	1–0	Frigg	Fredrik Schieldrop, (Minde)	Vestre Holmen, Kristiania	14,000
1921	Frigg Oslo	2–0	Odd	Alf Lagesen (Drammens BK)	Vestre Holmen, Kristiania	20,000
1922	Odd	5–1	Kvik Fredrikshald	Thorvald E. Johnsen, (Trygg)	Brann stadion, Bergen	8,000
1923	Brann	2–1	Lyn	Karl Aug. Andersen, (Kvik Fredrikshald)	Odds gressbane, Skien	8,000
1924	Odd	3–0	Mjøndalen	Trygve Høgbergh, (Fagerborg)	Sorgenfri gressbane, Trondheim	7,000
1925	Brann	3–0	Sarpsborg	Fridtjof Johansen (Holmestrand IF)	Old Fredrikstad Stadion, Fredrikstad	10,000
1926	Odd	3–0	Ørn	Finn Grefberg, (Frigg Oslo)	Ullevaal Stadion, Oslo	16,000
1927	Ørn	4–0	Drafn	Fritz Lütcherath, (Hasle-Løren)	Sandefjord stadion, Sandefjord	3,000
1928	Ørn	2–1	Lyn	Paulus Nilsen, (Brodd)	Halden stadion, Halden	6,717
1929	Sarpsborg	2 – 1 *	Ørn	Thoralf Kristiansen, (Gjøa)	Stavanger stadion, Stavanger	13,000
1930	Ørn	4–2	Drammens BK	Reidar Randers-Johansen, (Trygg)	Brann stadion, Bergen	6,000
1931	Odd	3–1	Mjøndalen	Bjarne H. Bech, (Ørn)	Lovisenlund idrettsplass, Larvik	13,000
1932	Fredrikstad	6–1	Ørn	Oscar Arvid Carlsen, (Lillestrøm)	Marienlyst stadion, Drammen	17,000
1933	Mjøndalen	3–1	Viking	Eivind Johansen (Larvik Turn)	Ullevaal Stadion, Oslo	23,000
1934	Mjøndalen	2 – 1 *	Sarpsborg	Kolbjørn Dæhlen (Skeid Fotball)	Sorgenfri gressbane, Trondheim	8,000
1935	Fredrikstad	4–0	Sarpsborg	Thoralf Christiansen (Stavanger IF)	Sarpsborg stadion, Sarpsborg	15,200
1936	Fredrikstad	2–0	Mjøndalen	Kåre Gunnar Kinn (Eidsvold IF)	Ullevaal Stadion, Oslo	20,000
1937	Mjøndalen	4–2	Odd	Alf Simensen (Sarpsborg FK)	Urædd stadion, Porsgrunn	17,000
1938	**Fredrikstad**	3 – 2 *	Mjøndalen	Finn Amundsen (Lyn Oslo)	Briskeby gressbane, Hamar	14,500
1939	Sarpsborg	2–1	Skeid	Gullik Hagajore (Tønsberg Turnforening)	Tønsberg gressbane, Tønsberg	8,000
1940	Fredrikstad	3–0	Skeid	Thorleiv Nordbø (Frigg Oslo FK)	Ullevaal Stadion, Oslo	30,000
1945	Lyn	1 – 1 *	Fredrikstad	Haakon Engebretsen (SK Brage)	Ullevaal Stadion, Oslo	34,162
1945 (R)	Lyn	1 – 1 *	Fredrikstad	Edvin Pedersen (SK Gjøa)	Sarpsborg stadion, Sarpsborg	18,000
1945 (2R)	Lyn	4–0	Fredrikstad	Nils Gundersen (Fram Larvik)	Bislett Stadium, Oslo	31,412
1946	Lyn	3 – 2 *	Fredrikstad	Sverre Hermansen (Fjellkameratene IL)	Ullevaal Stadion, Oslo	35,000
1947	Skeid	2–0	Viking	Bjarne Halvorsen (Skiold Fotball)	Brann stadion, Bergen	25,000
1948	Sarpsborg	1–0	Fredrikstad	Johan Narvestad, (Hasle-Løren)	Ullevaal Stadion, Oslo	35,000
1949	Sarpsborg	3–1	Skeid	Svend J. Svendsen (Torp IF)	Ullevaal Stadion, Oslo	36,000
1950	Fredrikstad	3–0	Brann	Josef Larsen (Frigg Oslo FK)	Ullevaal Stadion, Oslo	35,367
1951	Sarpsborg	3 – 2 *	Asker	Folke Bålstad, (Mercantile/Trygg)	Ullevaal Stadion, Oslo	30,639
1952	Sparta	3–2	Solberg	Helge Ladim (Grüner IL)	Ullevaal Stadion, Oslo	30,639
1953	Viking	2–1	Lillestrøm	Øivind Helgesen, (Liull)	Ullevaal Stadion, Oslo	31,102
1954	Skeid	3–0	Fredrikstad	Finn Å. Bråthen (Lillestrøm SK)	Ullevaal Stadion, Oslo	34,794
1955	Skeid	5–0	Lillestrøm	Henry Klausen (Sarpsborg FK)	Ullevaal Stadion, Oslo	33,825
1956	Skeid	2–0	Larvik Turn	Gunnar Andersen (Ulefoss SF)	Ullevaal Stadion, Oslo	33,444
1957	**Fredrikstad**	4–0	Sandefjord BK	Leif Gulliksen (Ørn FK)	Ullevaal Stadion, Oslo	33,073
1958	Skeid	1–0	Lillestrøm	Birger Nilsen (Grüner IL)	Ullevaal Stadion, Oslo	32,579
1959	Viking	3–1	Sandefjord BK	Trygve Dahlgren (IF Urædd)	Ullevaal Stadion, Oslo	28,195
1960	Rosenborg	3 – 3 *	Odd	Harald Heltberg (Frigg Oslo FK)	Ullevaal Stadion, Oslo	31,135
1960 (R)	Rosenborg	3–2	Odd	Arnold Nilsen (Nymark IL)	Ullevaal Stadion, Oslo	29,743
1961	**Fredrikstad**	7–0	Haugar	Bjørn Borgersen (Mercantile SFK)	Ullevaal Stadion, Oslo	30,273
1962	Gjøvik-Lyn	2–0	Vard	Georg Dragvoll (IK Brage)	Ullevaal Stadion, Oslo	31,157
1963	Skeid	2 – 0 *	Fredrikstad	Kåre Furulund, (Hasle-Løren)	Ullevaal Stadion, Oslo	31,444
1964	Rosenborg	2–1	Sarpsborg	Johan Riseth (Namsos IL)	Ullevaal Stadion, Oslo	24,665
1965	Skeid	2 – 2 *	Frigg	Finn Bolstad (Skiold Fotball)	Ullevaal Stadion, Oslo	18,821
1965 (R)	Skeid	1 – 1 *	Frigg	Rolf Hansen, (Skiens-Grane IF)	Ullevaal Stadion, Oslo	8,826
1965 (2R)	Skeid	2–1	Frigg	Sverre Eugen Olsen, (Akademisk BK)	Ullevaal Stadion, Oslo	8,990
1966	Fredrikstad	3–2	Lyn	Hans Granlund (Heggedal IL)	Ullevaal Stadion, Oslo	30,335
1967	Lyn	4–1	Rosenborg	Ivar Hornslien (Nydalen)	Ullevaal Stadion, Oslo	27,389
1968	**Lyn**	3–0	Mjøndalen	Henry Øberg (Hamar IL)	Ullevaal Stadion, Oslo	21,101
1969	Strømsgodset	2 – 2 *	Fredrikstad	Rolf H. Andersen (Skeid Fotball)	Ullevaal Stadion, Oslo	27,529
1969 (R)	Strømsgodset	5–3	Fredrikstad	Kåre Sirevaag (Viking FK)	Ullevaal Stadion, Oslo	24,022
1970	**Strømsgodset**	4–2	Lyn	Einar Røed (Tønsberg Turnforening)	Ullevaal Stadion, Oslo	25,744
1971	**Rosenborg**	4–1	Fredrikstad	Rolf Nyhus (Nordstrand IF)	Ullevaal Stadion, Oslo	25,180
1972	Brann	1–0	Rosenborg	Kjell Wahlen (Skeid Fotball)	Ullevaal Stadion, Oslo	17,700
1973	Strømsgodset	1–0	Rosenborg	Svein-Inge Thime (Stavanger IF)	Ullevaal Stadion, Oslo	23,209
1974	Skeid	3–1	Viking	Egil Bergstad (Borre IF)	Ullevaal Stadion, Oslo	14,276
1975	Bodø/Glimt	2–0	Vard	Kaare Lindboe (FK Vidar)	Ullevaal Stadion, Oslo	24,778
1976	Brann	2–1	Sogndal	Odd Johannessen (Vang FL)	Ullevaal Stadion, Oslo	22,834
1977	**Lillestrøm**	1–0	Bodø/Glimt	Rolf Haugen (Lillehammer FK)	Ullevaal Stadion, Oslo	22,648
1978	Lillestrøm	2–1	Brann	Reidar Bjørnestad (IL Sandviken)	Ullevaal Stadion, Oslo	23,534
1979	**Viking**	2–1	Haugar	Ivar Fredriksen (Lillestrøm SK)	Ullevaal Stadion, Oslo	25,000
1980	Vålerenga	4–1	Lillestrøm	Einar Halle (Molde FK)	Ullevaal Stadion, Oslo	23,000
1981	Lillestrøm	3–1	Moss	Jan Erik Olsen (Drammens BK)	Ullevaal Stadion, Oslo	22,895
1982	Brann	3–2	Molde	Torbjørn Aass (SK Brage)	Ullevaal Stadion, Oslo	24,000
1983	Moss	2–0	Vålerenga	Thorodd Presberg (Strømsgodset IF)	Ullevaal Stadion, Oslo	23,000
1984	Fredrikstad	3 – 3 *	Viking	Per Arne Larsgård (Sandefjord BK)	Ullevaal Stadion, Oslo	23,668
1984 (R)	Fredrikstad	3–2	Viking	Einar Halle (Molde FK)	Ullevaal Stadion, Oslo	15,993
1985	Lillestrøm	4–1	Vålerenga	Tore Hollung (Østsiden IL)	Ullevaal Stadion, Oslo	18,500
1986	Tromsø	4–1	Lillestrøm	Egil Nervik (SK Freidig)	Ullevaal Stadion, Oslo	22,000
1987	Bryne	1 – 0 *	Brann	Kjell Nordby (Rygge IL)	Ullevaal Stadion, Oslo	23,080
1988	Rosenborg	2 – 2 *	Brann	Bjørn Kronborg (Faaberg Fotball)	Ullevaal Stadion, Oslo	23,500
1988 (R)	**Rosenborg**	2–0	Brann	Thorodd Presberg (Strømsgodset IF)	Ullevaal Stadion, Oslo	23,700
1989	Viking	2 – 2 *	Molde	Rune Pedersen, (SK Sprint/Jeløy)	Ullevaal Stadion, Oslo	23,000
1989 (R)	Viking	2–1	Molde	Egil Nervik (SK Freidig)	Ullevaal Stadion, Oslo	9,856
1990	**Rosenborg**	5–1	Fyllingen	Arild Haugstad (Faaberg Fotball)	Ullevaal Stadion, Oslo	30,000
1991	Strømsgodset	3–2	Rosenborg	Roy Helge Olsen (Frigg Oslo FK)	Ullevaal Stadion, Oslo	27,240
1992	**Rosenborg**	3–2	Lillestrøm	Rune Pedersen, (SK Sprint/Jeløy)	Ullevaal Stadion, Oslo	28,217
1993	Bodø/Glimt	2–0	Strømsgodset	Sven Kjelbrott (Haugerud IF)	Ullevaal Stadion, Oslo	26,315
1994	Molde	3–2	Lyn	Terje Singsaas (Rosenborg BK)	Ullevaal Stadion, Oslo	24,524
1995	Rosenborg	1 – 1 *	Brann	Jon E. Skjervold (Fet IL)	Ullevaal Stadion, Oslo	27,561
1995 (R)	**Rosenborg**	3–1	Brann	Rune Pedersen, (SK Sprint/Jeløy)	Ullevaal Stadion, Oslo	20,076
1996	Tromsø	2–1	Bodø/Glimt	Terje Hauge (Lyngbø SK)	Ullevaal Stadion, Oslo	22,683
1997	Vålerenga	4–2	Strømsgodset	Roy Helge Olsen (Harstad IL)	Ullevaal Stadion, Oslo	22,678
1998	Stabæk	3 – 1 *	Rosenborg	Rune Pedersen, (SK Sprint/Jeløy)	Ullevaal Stadion, Oslo	23,251
1999	**Rosenborg**	2–0	Brann	Tom Henning Øvrebø (Nordstrand IF)	Ullevaal Stadion, Oslo	25,296
2000	Odd Grenland	2 – 1 *	Viking	Frode Kvam (Strindheim IL)	Ullevaal Stadion, Oslo	24,864
2001	Viking	3–0	Bryne	Kjell Alseth, (Stjørdals/Blink IL)	Ullevaal Stadion, Oslo	25,823
2002	Vålerenga	1–0	Odd Grenland	Tommy Skjerven (Kaupanger IL)	Ullevaal Stadion, Oslo	25,481
2003	**Rosenborg**	3 – 1 *	Bodø/Glimt	Terje Hauge (Olsvik IL)	Ullevaal Stadion, Oslo	25,447
2004	Brann	4–1	Lyn	Espen Berntsen (Vang FL)	Ullevaal Stadion, Oslo	25,458
2005	Molde	4 – 2 *	Lillestrøm	Brage Sandmoen, (Kjelsås IL)	Ullevaal Stadion, Oslo	25,182
2006	Fredrikstad	3–0	Sandefjord Fotball	Tom Henning Øvrebø (Nordstrand IF)	Ullevaal Stadion, Oslo	25,102
2007	Lillestrøm	2–0	Haugesund	Per Ivar Staberg (Harstad IL)	Ullevaal Stadion, Oslo	24,361
2008	Vålerenga	4–1	Stabæk	Svein Oddvar Moen (SK Haugar)	Ullevaal Stadion, Oslo	24,823
2009	Aalesund	2 – 2 † (5–4 pen.)	Molde	Kristoffer Helgerud (Lier IL)	Ullevaal Stadion, Oslo	25,500
2010	Strømsgodset	2–0	Follo	Tom Harald Hagen (Grue IL)	Ullevaal Stadion, Oslo	24,500
2011	Aalesund	2–1	Brann	Svein-Erik Edvartsen (Hamar IL)	Ullevaal Stadion, Oslo	25,032
2012	Hødd	1 – 1 † (4–2 pen.)	Tromsø	Kjetil Sælen, (Arna-Bjørnar)	Ullevaal Stadion, Oslo	24,217
2013	Molde	4–2	Rosenborg	Svein Oddvar Moen (SK Haugar)	Ullevaal Stadion, Oslo	24,824
2014	**Molde**	2–0	Odd	Dag Vidar Hafsås (Kolstad Fotball)	Ullevaal Stadion, Oslo	26,528
2015	**Rosenborg**	2–0	Sarpsborg 08	Ken Henry Johnsen, (Husøy & Foynland IF)	Ullevaal Stadion, Oslo	26,507
2016	**Rosenborg**	4–0	Kongsvinger	Tore Hansen (Feda IL)	Ullevaal Stadion, Oslo	26,912
2017	Lillestrøm	3–2	Sarpsborg 08	Ola Hobber Nilsen (Nordstrand IF)	Ullevaal Stadion, Oslo	25,091
2018	**Rosenborg**	4–1	Strømsgodset	Trond Ivar Døvle (Fjellhamar FK)	Ullevaal Stadion, Oslo	22,182
2019	Viking	1–0	Haugesund	Espen Eskås (Bækkelagets SK)	Ullevaal Stadion, Oslo	21,895
~~2020~~	Cancelled due to the COVID-19 pandemic					
2021	Molde	1–0	Bodø/Glimt	Rohit Saggi (SBK Drafn)	Ullevaal Stadion, Oslo	19,567
2022	Brann	2–0	Lillestrøm	Tore Hansen (Feda IL)	Ullevaal Stadion, Oslo	25,532
2023	Molde	1–0	Bodø/Glimt	Kristoffer Hagenes (IL Hovding)	Ullevaal Stadion, Oslo	19,178
2024	Fredrikstad	0 – 0 † (5–4 pen.)	Molde	Sigurd Smehus Kringstad (IL Valder)	Ullevaal Stadion, Oslo	23,058
2025	Lillestrøm	3–1	Sarpsborg 08	Sivert Øksnes Amland (Fana IL)	Ullevaal Stadion, Oslo	23,202
2025–26	Bodø/Glimt	3 – 3 † (4–2 pen.)	Brann	Marius Hansen Grøtta (Malmefjorden Idrettslag)	Ullevaal Stadion, Oslo	24,636

== Winners and finalists ==
=== Results by team ===
Since its establishment, the Norwegian Cup has been won by 27 different teams. Teams shown in italics are no longer in existence.

Club	Winners	Runners-up	Winning Years	Years as runners-up
Odd	12	9	1903, 1904, 1905, 1906, 1913, 1915, 1919, 1922, 1924, 1926, 1931, 2000	1902, 1908, 1909, 1910, 1921, 1937, 1960, 2002, 2014
Fredrikstad	12	7	1932, 1935, 1936, 1938, 1940, 1950, 1957, 1961, 1966, 1984, 2006, 2024	1945, 1946, 1948, 1954, 1963, 1969, 1971
Rosenborg	12	6	1960, 1964, 1971, 1988, 1990, 1992, 1995, 1999, 2003, 2015, 2016, 2018	1967, 1972, 1973, 1991, 1998, 2013
Lyn	8	6	1908, 1909, 1910, 1911, 1945, 1946, 1967, 1968	1923, 1928, 1966, 1970, 1994, 2004
Skeid	8	3	1947, 1954, 1955, 1956, 1958, 1963, 1965, 1974	1939, 1940, 1949
Brann	7	10	1923, 1925, 1972, 1976, 1982, 2004, 2022	1917, 1918, 1950, 1978, 1987, 1988, 1995 1999, 2011, 2025–26
Lillestrøm	7	8	1977, 1978, 1981, 1985, 2007, 2017, 2025	1953, 1955, 1958, 1980, 1986, 1992, 2005, 2022
Sarpsborg	6	6	1917, 1929, 1939, 1948, 1949, 1951	1906, 1907, 1925, 1934, 1935, 1964
Viking	6	5	1953, 1959, 1979, 1989, 2001, 2019	1933, 1947, 1974, 1984, 2000
Molde	6	4	1994, 2005, 2013, 2014, 2021, 2023	1982, 1989, 2009, 2024
Strømsgodset	5	3	1969, 1970, 1973, 1991, 2010	1993, 1997, 2018
Ørn-Horten	4	4	1920, 1927, 1928, 1930	1916, 1926, 1929, 1932
Vålerenga	4	2	1980, 1997, 2002, 2008	1983, 1985
Bodø/Glimt	3	5	1975, 1993, 2025–26	1977, 1996, 2003, 2021, 2023
Mjøndalen	3	5	1933, 1934, 1937	1924, 1931, 1936, 1938, 1968
Frigg	3	3	1914, 1916, 1921	1919, 1920, 1965
Mercantile	2	1	1907, 1912	1913
Tromsø	2	1	1986, 1996	2012
Aalesund	2	–	2009, 2011	–
Kvik Halden (Fredrikshald until 1928)	1	2	1918	1915, 1922
SK Grane	1	1	1902	1903
Gjøvik/Lyn	1	1	1962	1914
Moss	1	1	1983	1981
Bryne	1	1	1987	2001
Stabæk	1	1	1998	2008
Sparta	1	–	1952	–
Hødd	1	–	2012	–
Sarpsborg 08	–	3	–	2015, 2017, 2025
Urædd (includes Porsgrunds FC)	–	2	–	1904, 1911
Sandefjord BK	–	2	–	1957, 1959
Vard Haugesund	–	2	–	1962, 1975
Haugar	–	2	–	1961, 1979
Haugesund	–	2	–	2007, 2019
Akademisk Kristiania	–	1	–	1905
Fram Larvik	–	1	–	1912
Drafn	–	1	–	1927
Drammens BK	–	1	–	1930
Asker	–	1	–	1951
Solberg	–	1	–	1952
Larvik Turn	–	1	–	1956
Sogndal	–	1	–	1976
Fyllingen	–	1	–	1990
Sandefjord	–	1	–	2006
Follo	–	1	–	2010
Kongsvinger	–	1	–	2016

== Records and statistics ==
=== Final ===
==== Team ====
- Most wins: 12, joint record:
  - Odd (1903, 1904, 1905, 1906, 1913, 1915, 1919, 1922, 1924, 1926, 1931, 2000)
  - Rosenborg (1960, 1964, 1971, 1988, 1990, 1992, 1995, 1999, 2003, 2015, 2016, 2018)
- Most consecutive wins: 4, joint record:
  - Odd (1903, 1904, 1905, 1906)
  - Lyn (1908, 1909, 1910, 1911)
- Most appearances in a final: 21:
  - Odd (1902, 1903, 1904, 1905, 1906, 1908, 1909, 1910, 1913, 1915, 1919, 1921, 1922, 1924, 1926, 1931, 1937, 1960, 2000, 2002, 2014)
- Most Final appearances without ever winning: 2, joint record:
  - Urædd (includes Porsgrunds FC) (1904, 1911)
  - Sandefjord BK (1957, 1959)
  - Vard Haugesund (1962, 1975)
  - Haugar (1961, 1979)
  - Sarpsborg 08 (2015, 2017)
  - Haugesund (2007, 2019)
- Most Final appearances without ever losing: 2, Aalesund (2009, 2011)
- Most Final appearances without losing (streak): 7, Skeid (1954, 1955, 1956, 1958, 1963, 1965, 1974)
- Biggest win: 7 goals: Fredrikstad 7–0 Haugar, (1961)
- Most goals in a final: 8:
  - Strømsgodset 5–3 Fredrikstad (1969 Replay)
- Most goals by a losing side: 3, joint record:
  - Odd: Lost 3–4 against Lyn (1909), drew 3–3 against Rosenborg but lost 2–3 the replay (1960)
  - Fredrikstad: Lost 3–5 against Strømsgodset (1969)
  - Viking: Drew 3–3 against Fredrikstad but lost 2–3 the replay (1984)
- Most defeats: 9, joint record:
  - Odd (1902, 1908, 1909, 1910, 1921, 1937, 1960, 2002, 2014)
  - Brann (1917, 1918, 1950, 1978, 1987, 1988, 1995, 1999, 2011)
- Most wins while playing at tier 2: 2, Rosenborg (1960, 1964)
- Most Final appearances while playing at tier 3: 1, Haugar, (1961)

==== Individual ====
- Most wins by player: 6, Jan «Jonas» Gulbrandsen (Skeid) (1954, 1955, 1956, 1958, 1963, 1965)
- Most wins by manager: 6, Nils Arne Eggen (Rosenborg) (1971, 1988, 1990, 1992, 1995, 1999)
- Most goals (one final): 4, André Krogsæter (Lillestrøm) (1985)
- Most goals (one final, including replays): 5, Eldar Hansen (Rosenborg) (3 in 1960, 2 in 1960 replay)
- Youngest Cup finalist: Fredrik Aursnes (Hødd), 16 years and 350 days (2012)
- Oldest Cup winner: Hans Nordahl (Skeid), 40 years and 173 days (1958)
- Oldest Cup finalist: Claus Reitmaier (Lillestrøm), 41 years and 234 days (2005)

=== All rounds ===
- Highest attendance at Ullevaal Stadion: 36,000 at the 1949 final (Sarpsborg v. Skeid, 23 October 1949)

== Women ==
Since 1978, an official cup for women's clubs has also been played. The women's cup final is usually played on a Saturday, the day before the men's cup final. The 1978 cup final between BUL and Trondheims-Ørn was the only Norwegian cup final to be decided on penalties.

Before the 2006 final, the Norwegian Football Association decided that the Women's final would be played at Bislett Stadium instead of Ullevaal Stadion, which caused some debate. The Football Association claimed that two matches over one weekend would cause too much wear on the Ullevaal pitch, while representatives for the clubs claimed that the move was discriminating against women's football. When the semi-finals of the 2006 cup were drawn, all 4 clubs boycotted the draw in a protest against the move.

== See also ==
- List of Norwegian Football Cup finals
