= 1958 Norwegian Football Cup =

Norgesmesterskapet i fotball for menn 1958

Tournament details
- Country: Norway
- Teams: 128 (main competition)

Final positions
- Champions: Skeid (5th title)
- Runners-up: Lillestrøm

The 1958 Norwegian Football Cup was the 53rd season of the Norwegian annual knockout football tournament. The tournament was open for all members of NFF, except those from Northern Norway. Fredrikstad was the defending champions, but was beaten 1–0 by Lillestrøm in the semifinal.

The final was played at Ullevaal Stadion in Oslo on 19 October 1958, and was contested by the four-times former winners Skeid, and Lillestrøm who had lost both their previous appearances in the Norwegian Cup final in 1953 and 1955. Skeid won 1–0 against Lillestrøm in the final, and secured their fifth title.

== First round ==
| Team 1 | Score | Team 2 |
|---|---|---|
| Asker | 1–0 | Røa |
| Bangsund | 5–6 | Sverre |
| Borgar | 0–4 | Skeid |
| Clausenengen | 0–1 | Dahle |
| Djerv 1919 | 3–0 | Hardy |
| Donn | 3–1 | Vindbjart |
| Drammens BK | 1–0 | Mjøndalen |
| Egersund | 0–4 | Bryne |
| Falken | 2–3 | Rosenborg |
| Flekkefjord | 5–2 | Lyngdal |
| Freidig | 15–0 | Flå |
| Frigg | 8–0 | Heggedal |
| Geithus | 2–0 | Sandaker |
| Grane (Arendal) | 2–5 | Jerv |
| Greåker | 4–0 | Aasen |
| Grue | 2–1 | Hamar |
| HamKam | 1–3 | Fremad Lillehammer |
| Haugar | 0–1 | Brann |
| Hødd | 4–0 | Langevåg |
| Høyang | 1–3 | Varegg |
| Kongsvinger | 1–5 | Lillestrøm |
| Kristiansund | 2–0 | Herd |
| Kråkerøy | 0–1 | Sparta |
| Laksevåg | 0–2 | Baune |
| Larvik Turn | 8–0 | Kragerø |
| Lena | 3–0 | Gjøvik SK |
| Lillestrøm/Fram | 1–2 | Lyn |
| Lisleby | 3–1 | Ready |
| Løkken | 6–0 | Braatt |
| Mesna | 1–0 | Gjøvik-Lyn |
| Molde | 6–2 | Spjelkavik |
| Mysen | 0–5 | Fredrikstad |
| Nessegutten | 1–0 (a.e.t.) | Verdal |
| Nordnes | 2–1 | Djerv |
| Os | 4–2 | Sandviken |
| Pors | 2–0 | Skidar |
| Ranheim | 0–1 | Brage |
| Rapid | 3–2 | Runar |
| Raufoss | 3–1 | Vardal |
| Rollon | 1–2 | Aalesund |
| Sagene | 4–1 | Kjelsås |
| Sand | 1–3 | Kapp |
| Sandefjord BK | 1–2 | Drafn |
| Sarpsborg | 1–1 (a.e.t.) | Østsiden |
| Selbak | 2–0 | Askim |
| Snøgg | 0–3 | Åssiden |
| Sprint-Jeløy | 5–1 | Sterling |
| Stavanger | 4–0 | Start |
| Stjørdals-Blink | 1–0 | Steinkjer |
| Storm | 0–2 | Eik |
| Strømmen | 3–2 | Aurskog |
| Sørfjell | 3–1 | Skiens-Grane |
| Torp | 2–1 | Spartacus |
| Tynset | 1–3 | Kvik (Trondheim) |
| Tønsberg Turn | 1–2 | Falk |
| Ulefoss | 2–4 | Odd |
| Ulf | 2–0 | Jarl |
| Urædd | 0–3 | Fram (Larvik) |
| Vaulen | 0–0 (a.e.t.) | Vard |
| Vestfossen | 5–0 | Sørli |
| Vålerengen | 2–0 | Slemmestad |
| Ørn | 0–3 | Moss |
| Ålgård | 2–3 (a.e.t.) | Viking |
| Årstad | 5–1 | Jotun |
Replay
| Vard | 4–0 | Vaulen |
| Østsiden | 1–4 | Sarpsborg |

== Second round ==
| Team 1 | Score | Team 2 |
|---|---|---|
| Asker | 2–1 | Selbak |
| Brage | 5–0 | Mesna |
| Brann | 2–0 | Baune |
| Bryne | 8–2 | Flekkefjord |
| Donn | 2–3 | Ulf |
| Drafn | 0–2 | Rapid |
| Eik | 7–0 | Torp |
| Falk | 0–1 | Frigg |
| Fram (Larvik) | 1–1 (a.e.t.) | Vestfossen |
| Fredrikstad | 4–0 | Sprint-Jeløy |
| Fremad Lillehammer | 1–2 | Strømmen |
| Greåker | 5–1 | Geithus |
| Hødd | 5–0 | Dahle |
| Jerv | 1–4 | Pors |
| Kapp | 4–2 | Grue |
| Kristiansund | 8–1 | Rosenborg |
| Kvik (Trondheim) | 1–0 | Løkken |
| Lillestrøm | 3–2 | Lena |
| Lyn | 3–1 | Sarpsborg |
| Moss | 0–1 | Larvik Turn |
| Odd | 7–0 | Sørfjell |
| Os | 1–3 | Årstad |
| Sagene | 2–0 | Raufoss |
| Skeid | 5–0 | Lisleby |
| Sparta | 1–1 (a.e.t.) | Drammens BK |
| Stjørdals-Blink | 0–5 | Freidig |
| Sverre | 3–1 (a.e.t.) | Nessegutten |
| Vard | 0–1 | Stavanger |
| Varegg | 1–0 (a.e.t.) | Djerv 1919 |
| Viking | 1–0 | Nordnes |
| Aalesund | 0–2 | Molde |
| Åssiden | 0–2 | Vålerengen |
Replay
| Drammens BK | 3–1 | Sparta |
| Vestfossen | 3–1 | Fram (Larvik) |

== Third round ==
| Team 1 | Score | Team 2 |
|---|---|---|
10 August 1958
| Rapid | 3–3 (a.e.t.) | Eik |
| Frigg | 4–3 | Kvik (Trondheim) |
| Vålerengen | 2–3 | Asker |
| Strømmen | 4–2 | Sagene |
| Vestfossen | 2–3 | Fredrikstad |
| Drammens BK | 2–1 | Odd |
| Larvik Turn | 2–0 | Lyn |
| Pors | 2–1 (a.e.t.) | Greåker |
| Brage | 2–1 | Sverre |
| Ulf | 0–2 | Skeid |
| Stavanger | 1–2 | Viking |
| Varegg | 0–4 | Brann |
| Hødd | 0–2 | Lillestrøm |
| Kristiansund | 3–1 | Kapp |
| Molde | 1–2 | Freidig |
| Årstad | 5–2 | Bryne |
Replay: 14 August 1958
| Eik | 1–0 | Rapid |

== Fourth round ==
| Team 1 | Score | Team 2 |
|---|---|---|
31 August 1958
| Eik | 3–2 | Strømmen |
| Lillestrøm | 2–1 | Brage |
| Freidig | 1–2 | Årstad |
| Skeid | 7–3 | Kristiansund |
| Brann | 5–4 | Larvik Turn |
| Asker | 1–2 (a.e.t.) | Drammens BK |
| Viking | 2–1 | Frigg |
| Fredrikstad | 5–3 (a.e.t.) | Pors |

== Quarter-finals ==
| Team 1 | Score | Team 2 |
|---|---|---|
21 September 1958
| Eik | 1–1 (a.e.t.) | Fredrikstad |
| Viking | 2–1 | Brann |
| Drammens BK | 3–5 | Skeid |
| Årstad | 2–4 (a.e.t.) | Lillestrøm |
Replay: 24 September 1958
| Fredrikstad | 5–1 | Eik |

== Semi-finals ==
| Team 1 | Score | Team 2 |
|---|---|---|
5 October 1958
| Skeid | 3–2 | Viking |
| Fredrikstad | 0–1 | Lillestrøm |

== Final ==
19 October 1958

| Skeid | 1–0 | Lillestrøm |
|---|---|---|
| Tidemann 62' | Report |

Ullevaal Stadion, Oslo
Attendance: 32,579
Referee: Birger Nilsen (Grüner)

== See also ==
- 1957–58 Norwegian Main League
- 1958 in Norwegian football
