= 1924 Norwegian Football Cup =

Norgesmesterskapet i fotball for menn 1924

Tournament details
- Country: Norway

Final positions
- Champions: Odd (9th title)
- Runners-up: Mjøndalen

The 1924 Norwegian Football Cup was the 23rd season of the Norwegian annual knockout football tournament. The tournament was open for all members of NFF. Odd won their ninth title, having beaten Mjøndalen in the final. Brann were the defending champions, but were eliminated by Mjøndalen in the semifinal.

== First round ==
Team 1	Score	Team 2
Brann	4–1	Viking
Brodd	2–1	Vidar
Braatt	4–2	Rollon
Donn	2–1	Start
Falk	1–0	Kvik (Fredrikshald)
Fram (Larvik)	6–0	Snøgg
Fredrikstad	1–2 (a.e.t.) (annulled) (Note: All games counted as first round games, Winners Larvik Turn had a walkover in the second round.)	Larvik Turn
Hamar	1–2	Gjøa
Kjapp	0–2	Odd
Kvik (Trondhjem)	5–0	Sverre
Lillestrøm SK	1–2	Lyn
Lillestrøm BK	2–1	Fremad
Lyn (Gjøvik)	6–0	Eidsvold
Mercur	0–1	Brage
Nesset	3–2	Tryggkameratene
Pors	2–1	Agnes
Ranheim	5–0	Strinda
Rapp	2–1	Freidig
Ready	5–1	Hafslund
Sarpsborg	1–1 (a.e.t.)	Mjøndalen
Skiold	1–1 (a.e.t.)	Urædd
Skotfos	0–5	Drafn
Storm	7–0	Grane
Strømsgodset	2–2 (a.e.t.)	Mercantile
Torp	1–4	Frigg
Trygg	0–1	Drammens BK
Tønsberg Turn	2–1	Moss
Vard	0–2	Stavanger IF
Vaalerengen	4–4 (a.e.t.)	Holmestrand
Ørn	9–0	Sportskl. 1910
Aalesund	3–2	Djerv
Replay
Holmestrand	5–2	Vaalerengen
Larvik Turn	2–2 (a.e.t.)	Fredrikstad
Mercantile	0–2	Strømsgodset
Mjøndalen	1–0	Sarpsborg
Urædd	2–0	Skiold
2nd replay
Fredrikstad	1–1 (a.e.t.)	Larvik Turn
3rd replay
Larvik Turn	1–0	Fredrikstad

== Second round ==
Team 1	Score	Team 2
Brage	7–1	Nesset
Donn	0–2	Brodd
Drafn	3–1	Ready
Drammens BK	1–3	Urædd
Falk	1–0	Ørn
Gjøa	0–2	Strømsgodset
Kvik (Trondhjem)	4–2	Ranheim
Lillestrøm BK	1–3 (a.e.t.)	Frigg
Mjøndalen	9–1	Tønsberg Turn
Odd	3–2	Fram
Pors	1–0	Lyn
Rapp	1–2	Lyn (Gjøvik)
Stavanger IF	0–1 (a.e.t.)	Brann
Storm	7–0	Holmestrand
Aalesund	4–3	Braatt

== Third round ==
Team 1	Score	Team 2
Falk	0–1	Aalesund
Strømsgodset	1–0 (a.e.t.)	Brage
Brann	3–2	Frigg
Lyn (Gjøvik)	3–1	Brodd
Larvik Turn	1–0	Drafn
Mjøndalen	6–0	Kvik (Trondhjem)
Odd	4–0	Storm
Urædd	0–0 (a.e.t.)	Pors
Replay
Pors	1–3	Urædd

== Quarter-finals ==
Team 1	Score	Team 2
Lyn (Gjøvik)	3–2 (a.e.t.)	Aalesund
Strømsgodset	0–1	Brann
Mjøndalen	3–0	Larvik Turn
Urædd	1–3	Odd

== Semi-finals ==
Team 1	Score	Team 2
Mjøndalen	2–1	Brann
Odd	2–1	Lyn (Gjøvik)

== Final ==
2 October 1924

Odd	3–0	Mjøndalen
Ulrichsen 25', 58'; Haakonsen 44'	Report

Sorgenfri gressbane, Trondhjem
Attendance: 7,000
Referee: Trygve Høgbergh (Fagerborg)

== See also ==
- 1924 in Norwegian football
