= 1904 in Norwegian football =

Football in Norway
Men's football
- NM: Odd

Results from the Football in Norway in 1904.

== Cup ==
=== Final ===
4 September 1904

| Odd | 4–0 | Porsgrunds FC |
|---|---|---|
| Pettersen 10'; Gasman ?', 30'; Gundersen ?' | Report |

Sportsplassen, Skien
Attendance: 800
Referee: Thomas Viborg (Kragerø)

== See also ==
- List of football clubs in Norway
- Norwegian Football Cup seasons
