= 1906 Norwegian Football Cup =

Norgesmesterskapet i fotball for menn 1906

Tournament details
- Country: Norway
- Teams: 4

Final positions
- Champions: Odd (4th title)
- Runners-up: Sarpsborg

Tournament statistics
- Matches played: 3
- Goals scored: 6 (2 per match)

The 1906 Norwegian Football Cup was the 5th edition of the Norwegian annual knockout football tournament, open in 1906 to local association leagues (kretsserier) champions, except Kristiania og omegn where a separate cup qualifying tournament was held. This final was the first attended by the Norwegian Royal Family. Odd successfully defended its 1905 title on 9 September, 1–0, at Gamle Frogner, Kristiania against Sarpsborg, winning their fourth consecutive title.

== Semi-finals ==
| Team 1 | Score | Team 2 |
|---|---|---|
8 September 1906
| Akademisk FK | 0–1 | Odd |
| Eidsvold IF | 0–4 | Sarpsborg |

== Final ==
9 September 1906

| Odd | 1–0 | Sarpsborg |
|---|---|---|
| 60' | Report |

Gamle Frogner, Kristiania
Referee: Sverre Strand (Grane)

Odds BK:
| GK | Jacob Abrahamsen |
| DF | Guttorm Hol |
| DF | Øivind Gundersen |
| MF | Bernhard Halvorsen |
| MF | Fridtjof Nilsen |
| MF | Øivind Stensrud |
| FW | Otto Olsen |
| FW | Harbo Madsen |
| FW | Johan Nilsen |
| FW | Berthold Pettersen |
| FW | Daniel Gasman |

Sarpsborg:
| GK | J. Jørgensen |
| DF | Christian Berg |
| DF | Erling Mathieassen |
| MF | Einar Andvik |
| MF | Ole Iversen Jr. |
| MF | Thorvald Holth |
| FW | Hugh William Kennworthy |
| FW | Herbert Scott |
| FW | Trygve Jølstad |
| FW | Karl Johansen |
| FW | Hans Slang |
