= 1909 Norwegian Football Cup =

Norgesmesterskapet i fotball for menn 1909

Tournament details
- Country: Norway
- Teams: 6

Final positions
- Champions: Lyn (2nd title)
- Runners-up: Odd

Tournament statistics
- Matches played: 5
- Goals scored: 28 (5.6 per match)

The 1909 Norwegian Football Cup was the eighth season of the Norwegian annual knockout football tournament. The tournament was open for 1909 local association leagues (kretsserier) champions, except in Smaalene and Kristiania og omegn where a separate cup qualifying tournament was held. Lyn won their second consecutive title.

== First round ==
Team 1	Score	Team 2
18 September 1909
Ulf (Drammen)	0–2	Odd
Lyn (Gjøvik)	2–4	Fredrikstad

- Lyn and Trondhjems Teknikere received a bye.

== Semi-finals ==
Team 1	Score	Team 2
25 September 1909
Lyn	9–2	Fredrikstad
Odd	2–0	Trondhjems Teknikere

== Final ==
26 September 1909

Lyn	4–3 (a.e.t.)	Odd
	Report

Gamle Frogner, Kristiania
Attendance: 4,000
Referee: Christian Wiese (Akademisk FK)

Lyn:
GK	August Heiberg Kahrs
DF	Ola Tygesen
DF	Paul Due
MF	Henrik Nordby
MF	Erling Lorck
MF	Hjalmar Syversen
FW	Alf Paus
FW	Knut Heyerdahl-Larsen
FW	Victor Nysted
FW	Erling Maartmann
FW	Rolf Maartmann

Odd:
GK	Thostrup Rødseth
DF	Peder Henriksen
DF	Henry Pettersen
MF	August Fredriksen
MF	Marius Lund
MF	Einar Pedersen
FW	Otto Olsen
FW	Berthold Pettersen
FW	Bjarne Gulbrandsen
FW	Thormod Lie
FW	Henry Reinholdt
