= 1905 Norwegian Football Cup =

Norgesmesterskapet i fotball for menn 1905

Tournament details
- Country: Norway
- Teams: 4

Final positions
- Champions: Odd (3rd title)
- Runners-up: Akademisk FK

Tournament statistics
- Matches played: 3
- Goals scored: 7 (2.33 per match)

The 1905 Norwegian Football Cup was the 4th edition of the Norwegian annual knockout football tournament open that year of 1905 to local association leagues (kretsserier) champions, except Kristiania og omegn where a separate cup qualifying tournament was held. Odd successfully defended its 1904 title on 10 September, 2-1, at Gamle Frogner, Kristiania against Akademisk FK, winning their third consecutive cup.

== Semi-finals ==
Team 1	Score	Team 2
9 September 1905
Akademisk FK	3–0	Fredrikstad
Eidsvold IF	0–1	Odd

== Final ==
10 September 1905

Odd	2–1	Akademisk FK
56'; 71'	Report	85'

Gamle Frogner, Kristiania
Attendance: 3,000
Referee: Arthur Nordlie (Lyn)

Odds BK:
GK	Andrew Johnsen
DF	Guttorm Hol
DF	Erling Jensen
MF	Bernhard Halvorsen
MF	Fridtjof Nilsen
MF	Ingvald Ustad
FW	Petter Hol
FW	Johan Nilsen
FW	Øivind Gundersen
FW	Berthold Pettersen
FW	Daniel Gasman

Akademisk FK:
GK	Michael Kaas
DF	Oscar Strugstad
DF	Alf Killen
MF	Henning Wiese
MF	Erling Lorck
MF	Christian Wiese
FW	Thorvald Torgersen
FW	Alf Bang
FW	Nikolai Ramm Østgaard
FW	W. Lie
FW	Severin Heyerdahl
