= 1902 Norwegian Football Cup =

Norgesmesterskapet i fotball for herrer 1902

Tournament details
- Country: Norway
- Teams: 5

Final positions
- Champions: Grane (1st title)
- Runners-up: Odd

Tournament statistics
- Matches played: 4
- Goals scored: 18 (4.5 per match)

The 1902 Norwegian Football Cup was the first edition of the Norwegian Football Cup annual knockout football invitational tournament organised by Kristiania IF and NFF for football in Norway. Later, the results would be accepted as official record. Five teams contested. Odd reached the final without playing a match.

Grane won the tournament.

== First round ==
Team 1	Score	Team 2
1 June 1902
Grane	10–0	Porsgrunds FC
Lyn	0–2	Spring

- Odd received a bye.

== Semi-finals ==
Team 1	Score	Team 2
15 June 1902
Grane	4–0	Spring

- Odd received a bye.

== Final ==
16 June 1902

Grane	2–0	Odd
Thune-Larsen	Report

Gamle Frogner, Kristiania
Referee: Bredo Larsen (Lyn)

Sportsklubben Grane:
GK	Anton Endrerud
DF	Carl Blix
DF	Bjarne Vig
MF	Sverre Strand
MF	Wilhelm Wettergren
MF	Sverre Nergaard
FW	Olaf Olsen
FW	Walter Aigeltinger
FW	Emil Wettergreen
FW	Eivind Thune-Larsen
FW	Th. Dürendahl
