= Eivind Johansen =

Eivind H. Johansen
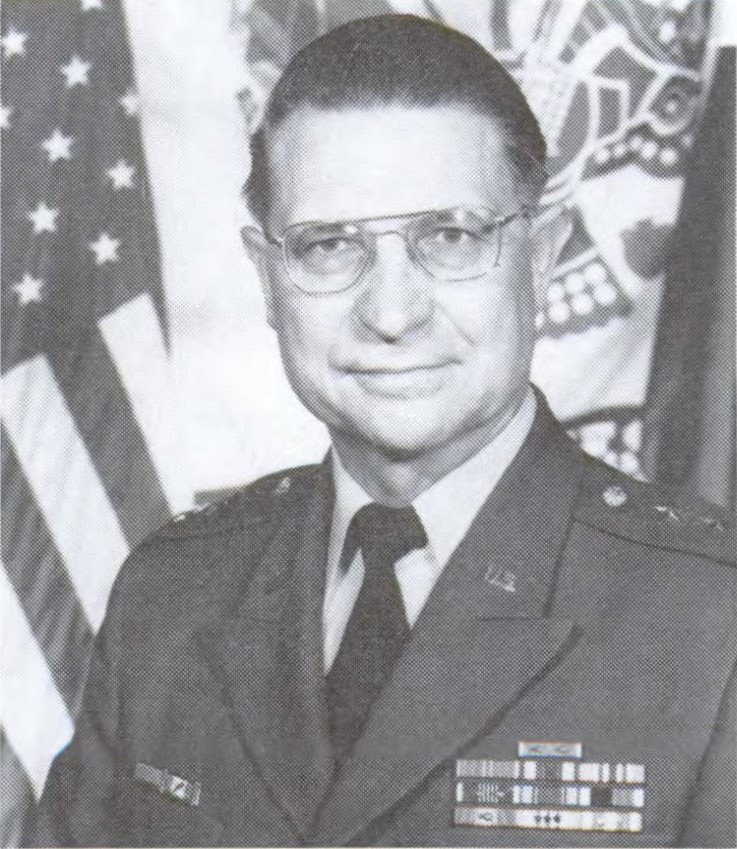
- Born: March 7, 1927; Charleston, South Carolina, U.S.
- Died: December 19, 2012 (aged 85); Charlottesville, Virginia, U.S.
- Military career
- Allegiance: United States
- Branch: United States Army
- Service years: 1945–1947, 1950–1979
- Rank: Lieutenant General
- Nickname: Ivy
- Conflicts: Vietnam War

Eivind Herbert Johansen (March 7, 1927 – December 19, 2012) was a lieutenant general in the United States Army. He served as Deputy Chief of Staff for Logistics for the Army from 1977 to 1979.

After graduating from high school in Port Arthur, Texas, Johansen enlisted in the Army on June 14, 1945. Released from active duty on January 26, 1947, he enrolled at the A&M College of Texas. Johansen completed a B.S. degree in business administration in June 1950 and was commissioned a second lieutenant in the Quartermaster Corps. He took graduate courses at the Harvard Business School in 1955 and later earned an M.S. degree in international affairs from George Washington University in 1968.

In December 1969, Johansen was deployed to Vietnam to command the 593rd General Support Group. In June 1970, he was placed in charge of the G–4 Supply Division in Vietnam. Returning to the United States, Johansen was posted to the Pentagon in December 1970.

Johansen retired from the Army in June 1979.

Johansen was married to Dolores Eva Klockmann (September 22, 1928 – October 29, 2020). The couple had a son, daughter, three grandchildren and, as of February 2021, four great-grandchildren. A fifth great-grandchild predeceased his great-grandmother.

After Johansen died in December 2012, he was buried at Arlington National Cemetery on March 4, 2013. His wife was interred next to him on January 29, 2021.
