= 1903 Norwegian Football Cup =

Norgesmesterskapet i fotball for menn 1903

Tournament details
- Country: Norway
- Teams: 4

Final positions
- Champions: Odd (1st title)
- Runners-up: Grane

Tournament statistics
- Matches played: 3
- Goals scored: 3 (1 per match)

The 1903 Norwegian Football Cup was the second edition of a Norwegian annual knockout football invitational tournament founded in 1902 that would later be recognized in league standings. Four teams contested the title. Grane organized the event and unsuccessfully defended its 1902 title on 22 September, 1-0, at Gamle Frogner, Kristiania losing to Odd.

== Semi-finals ==
Team 1	Score	Team 2
21 September 1903
Porsgrunds FC	0–1	Grane
22 September 1903
Lyn	0–1	Odd

== Final ==
22 September 1903

Odd	1–0	Grane
Gasman	Report

Gamle Frogner, Kristiania
Referee: Finn Hagemann (Lyn)

Odds BK:
GK	Andrew Johnsen
DF	Guttorm Hol
DF	Erling Jensen
MF	Johan Schrøder
MF	Paul Riis
MF	Gustav Isaksen
FW	Petter Hol
FW	Finn Munster
FW	Øivind Gundersen
FW	Berthold Pettersen
FW	Daniel Gasman
