= 1904 Norwegian Football Cup =

Norgesmesterskapet i fotball for menn 1904

Tournament details
- Country: Norway
- Teams: 4

Final positions
- Champions: Odd (2nd title)
- Runners-up: Porsgrunds FC

Tournament statistics
- Matches played: 3
- Goals scored: 12 (4 per match)

The 1904 Norwegian Football Cup was the third edition of a Norwegian annual knockout football tournament founded in 1902. All NFF member clubs could contest in this edition; four did so. It was organised by Odd who successfully defended its 1903 title on 4 September, 4–0, at Sportsplassen, Skien against Porsgrunds FC.

== Semi-finals ==
Team 1	Score	Team 2
3 September 1904
Odd	3–0	Larvik Turn
Fredrikstad	0–5	Porsgrunds FC

== Final ==
4 September 1904

Odd	4–0	Porsgrunds FC
Pettersen 10'; Gasman ?', 30'; Gundersen ?'	Report

Sportsplassen, Skien
Attendance: 800
Referee: Thomas Viborg (Kragerø)

Odd:
GK	Andrew Johnsen
DF	Guttorm Hol
DF	Erling Jensen
MF	Bernhard Halvorsen
MF	Fridtjof Nilsen
MF	Gustav Isaksen
FW	Petter Hol
FW	Harbo Madsen
FW	Øivind Gundersen
FW	Berthold Pettersen
FW	Daniel Gasman

Porsgrunds FC:
GK	Isak B. Henrichsen
DF	Hans Sørli
DF	Isak Isaksen
MF	Karl Andresen
MF	Andreas Hansen
MF	Johan Henriksen
FW	Finn Jeremiassen
FW	Christian Dick
FW	C.M. Carlsrud
FW	Waldemar Lassen
FW	Ernst Hansen

== See also ==
- 1904 in Norwegian football
