= Borre IF =

Norwegian sports club

- Full name: Borre Idrettsforening
- Founded: 1 July 1933
- Ground: Borre idrettspark, Borre
- League: 4. divisjon
- 2019: 11th

Borre Idrettsforening is a Norwegian multi-sports club from Borre in Horten Municipality, Vestfold county. It has sections for association football, team handball and gymnastics.

The men's football team plays in the 4. divisjon, the fifth tier of Norwegian football. It was formerly a staple in the 3. divisjon from 1996 to 2007.
