= Drammens BK =

Norwegian sports club

- Full name: Drammens Ballklubb
- Short name: DBK
- Founded: 14 August 1909; 115 years ago
- Ground: Ørenbanen
- League: 4. divisjon (Buskerud)
- 2018: 4. divisjon (Buskerud), 3rd of 14
- Website: http://www.dbk.no/
| Home colours | Away colours |

Drammens Ballklubb is a Norwegian multi-sports club from Øren in Drammen. Founded 14 August 1909 as a merger of clubs Idun and Spring, the club was initially a football club only. It has currently sections for association football, cross-country skiing, bandy and Esports. The club had athletes in ski jumping, but that department is folded.

== Football ==
=== History ===
Their first game was played on 22 August 1909 in Bacheparken. Drammens BK won 6–1 against Kongsberg IF. The club reached the final of the 1930 Norwegian Cup through their 2–0 win against Stavanger IF in the semi-final. On 19 October 1930, Drammens BK lost the final 2–4 against Ørn. This is still the only occasion Drammens BK played in the Cup final, the nearest they have been since is quarter-finals against Skeid in both 1949 and 1958.

In 2006, Drammens BK promoted to 4. divisjon, the fifth tier in the Norwegian football league system, for the first time in 14 years. Drammens BK promoted to 3. divisjon, in 2012, but were relegated in the following season. The team currently play in 4. divisjon and play their home games at Ørenbanen, which got artificial turf in 2003.

=== Achievements ===
- Norwegian Cup:

Runners-up (1): 1930

=== Recent seasons ===
| Season | | Pos. | Pl. | W | D | L | GS | GA | P | Cup | Notes |
|---|---|---|---|---|---|---|---|---|---|---|---|
| 2015 | 4. divisjon | 10 | 26 | 10 | 2 | 14 | 78 | 92 | 32 | dnq | |
| 2016 | 4. divisjon | 8 | 24 | 9 | 4 | 11 | 54 | 71 | 31 | dnq | |
| 2017 | 4. divisjon | 9 | 26 | 10 | 3 | 13 | 50 | 65 | 33 | dnq | |
| 2018 | 4. divisjon | 3 | 26 | 15 | 2 | 9 | 78 | 50 | 47 | First qualifying round | |

== Ice hockey ==
The club's ice hockey department was started ahead of the 1952 Winter Olympics. Olympic hockey games were played at Marienlyst Stadion, and the club played its first games before the Olympics began. In 2018, Ørenbanen was renovated and updated with a new cooling system for the ice rink.
