= SFK Trygg =

Norwegian sports club

Ski- og Fotballklubben Trygg
- City: Oslo, Norway
- Founded: 1907

Franchise history
- 1907–1947: Ski- og Fotballklubben Trygg

Ski- og Fotballklubben Trygg was a sports club in Oslo, Norway, which played an important role for bandy in Norway and also was well known for its ice hockey section.

== History ==
The club was founded in 1907.

The ice hockey team was one of the founding members of the Hovedserien, the top level Norwegian league, for the 1934–35 season. They won the league championship in 1935 and then again in 1938. Their last appearance in the league came during the 1938–39 season.

The bandy section was one of the founding members of Norges Ishockeyforbund in 1920, later renamed the Norway's Bandy Association and still the governing body for bandy in Norway. It won the Norwegian Bandy Premier League in 1921.

The club also consisted of a football department.

The club merged with Mercantile SFK in 1947.
