= Neset FK =

Norwegian football club

- Full name: Neset Fotballklubb
- Founded: 1 June 1905 (120 years ago)
- Ground: Vinnatrøa kunstgress, Frosta
- League: Fifth Division
- 2025: 5th
- Website: http://www.nesetfk.no/
Home colours	Away colours

Neset Fotballklubb is a Norwegian association football club located in Frosta Municipality in Trøndelag county. The club was founded 1 June 1905 as Trygg. The men's team currently plays in 5. divisjon, the sixth tier of the Norwegian football league system. Neset play their home games at Vinnatrøa kunstgress.

== History ==
The club was founded as Trygg on 1 June 1905. In 1914, they changed their name to Neset Fotballklubb as they became part of Nordenfjeldske Fotballkrets. They played their first game in the summer of 1905, although the team did not have kits, but played with knit caps in the club's colours.

The club participated in the inaugural season of the national league top division; the 1937–38 Norgesserien. They won their district group containing teams from Trøndelag, and qualified for the championship play-offs. They were eliminated by Kristiansund after a 7–2 loss on aggregate in the quarter-finals. Neset reached the fourth round of the Norwegian Cup in 1938, where they were eliminated by Odd after a 2–0 defeat. In 1940, the club made their best ever performance in the Norwegian Cup as they reached the fifth round, where they were eliminated by Sarpsborg after a 3–1 defeat. In the 1947–48 Norgesserien, the first post-war league season, Neset were among the 58 teams that relegated from the top division due to restructuring of the league system. They have not played on the top level since.

Neset played in the 2015 3. divisjon, but was relegated two consecutive times, first to the 4. divisjon and then to the 2017 5. divisjon. They promoted to the 2018 4. divisjon, but was relegated the following season; their third relegation in four seasons.

=== Recent seasons ===
Season		Pos.	Pl.	W	D	L	GS	GA	P	Cup	Notes
2015	3. divisjon (Trøndelag)	↓ 12	26	7	2	17	43	86	23	First round	Relegated to 4. divisjon
2016	4. divisjon (Trøndelag)	↓ 6	22	10	7	5	61	49	37	First qualifying round	Relegated to 5. divisjon due to restructuring of the league system
2017	5. divisjon (Trøndelag)	↑ 1	18	15	1	2	66	20	46	dnq	Promoted to 4. divisjon
2018	4. divisjon (Trøndelag)	↓ 11	22	5	1	16	17	68	16	dnq	Relegated to 5. divisjon
2019	5. divisjon (Trøndelag)	7	18	8	2	8	29	45	26	dnq	
