= Odds BK =

Norwegian association football club

Odd
- Full name: Odds Ballklubb
- Nickname: Oddrane
- Founded: 31 March 1894; 132 years ago
- Ground: Skagerak Arena; Skien
- Capacity: 12 000
- Chairman: Bernt Ove Søvik
- Manager: Per Frandsen
- League: 1. divisjon
- 2026: 1. Divisjon, 5th of 16
- Website: www.odd.no
Home colours	Away colours

Odds Ballklubb, commonly known as Odd, is a Norwegian professional football club from Skien. Originally the football section of a multi-sports club, it was founded in 1894, nine years after the club's founding. Most sports other than football and gymnastics were discontinued, and the club became dedicated primarily to football. Odd plays in the Norwegian First Division, the second tier of the Norwegian football league system, and holds the record of winning the Norwegian Football Cup the most times with twelve wins, the last coming in 2000. The club was known as Odd Grenland between 1994 and 2012. Founded in 1894, Odd is the oldest football club in Norway. As of 13 May 2017 the club was granted a membership in Club of Pioneers. It then became the first Nordic football club to be granted this membership.

== History ==
IF Odd was founded in 1885, and is thus one of the older sports clubs in Norway still in existence. The name derives from Viktor Rydberg's novel Seierssverdet, where one of the main characters was a Norwegian athlete called Orvar Odd.

In the beginning, IF Odd was mainly focused on gymnastics and also had a department for Nordic skiing and track and field. A department for football, named Odds BK, was founded on 31 March 1894. This initiative was the club's second effort to do so, some time after English workers at nearby Skotfoss brought the game of football to Skien, and the city decided to buy a football. Odd is counted as Norway's oldest football team still in existence.

Odd started a cooperation with the local club Pors in 1994 and changed their names to Odd Grenland and Pors Grenland in an effort to represent the district of Grenland. In conjunction with the name change, a public limited company named Grenland Fotball was founded. Pors Grenland withdrew from the cooperation in December 2009, and in January 2013 Odd Grenland decided to change its name back to Odds BK because they wanted to be a club for the entire county of Telemark.

Odd won the Norwegian Football Cup in 1903, 1904, 1905, 1906, 1913, 1915, 1919, 1922, 1924, 1926, 1931, and 2000, more than any other team in Norway. In the late 20th century, the men's team struggled in the lower divisions for many years but made it back to the Tippeligaen in 1999 and stayed there until they were relegated in 2007. The team had survived relegation twice; first in 2005 after a dreadful start to the campaign, then in 2006 when the team only survived relegation by beating Bryne in the relegation play-offs. In 2007 the team was relegated to the 1. divisjon after being beaten by Bodø/Glimt in the relegation play-offs. In 2008, with three games still to play, Odd secured the promotion back to the Tippeligaen after winning 4–0 at home against Hødd.

On 25 September 2011, Odd player Jone Samuelsen scored what is claimed to be the longest headed goal ever scored in a match, in a match against Tromsø, when he headed the ball from within his own half of the pitch into Tromsø's open goal, the goalkeeper having come forward for a late corner in the match. Norwegian police were invited to measure the distance and calculated the length to be 58.13 metres.

== Home ground ==
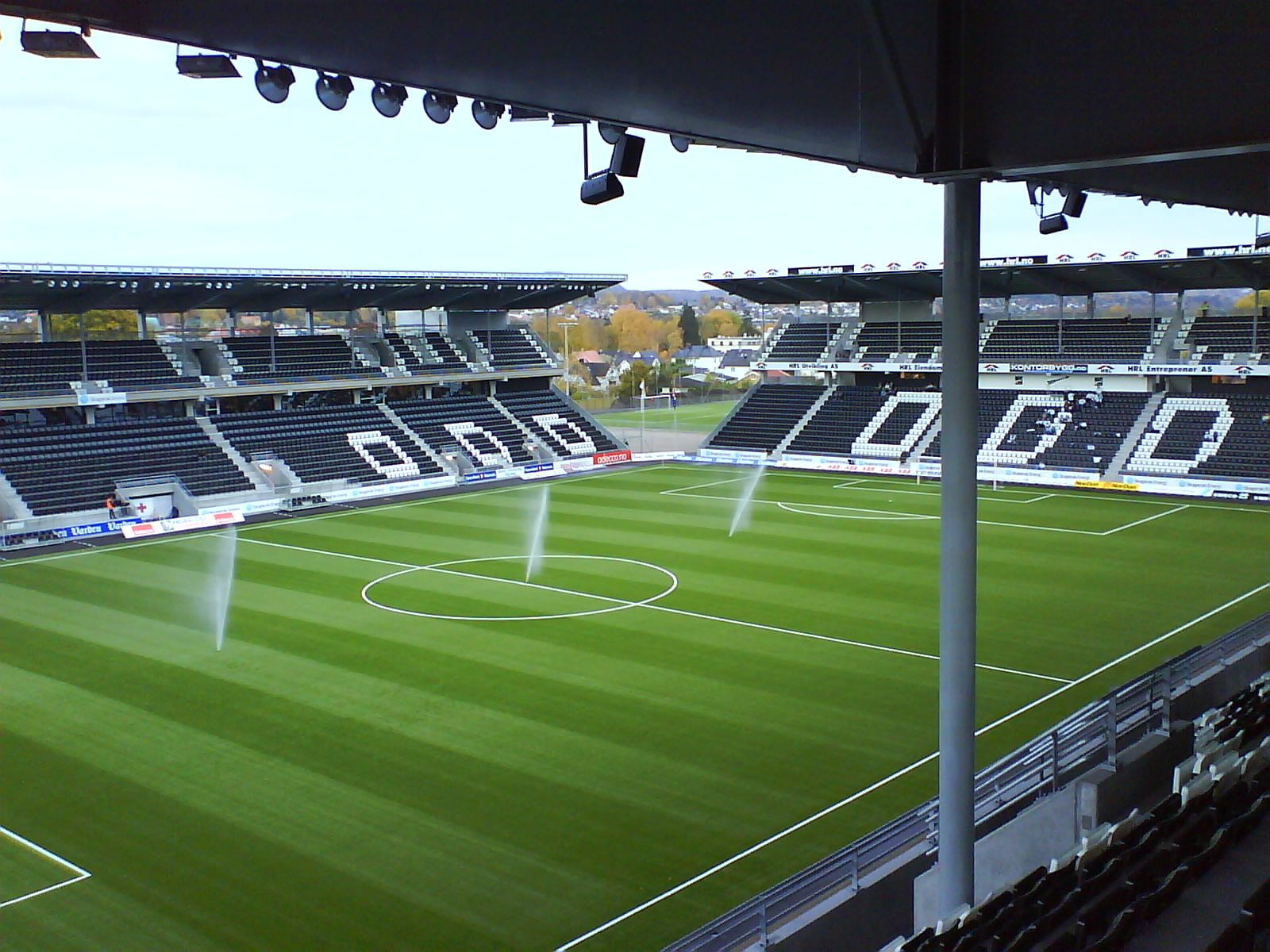
Skagerak Arena viewed from Sparebank 1 tribune

The club's home ground is Skagerak Arena (capacity 12,000), has seen the largest crowd (approx. 12,500 people) at the 1984 Cup semi-final against Viking, though the official number is 8854. Officially, the highest attendance is 12.436, achieved in the 2015 Europa League play-off against Borussia Dortmund. The stadium was rebuilt to hold a capacity of between 13,000 and 14,000, and was finished in 2008. It is named Skagerak Arena after local sponsor Skagerak Energi.

== Players and staff ==
=== First-team squad ===
As of 3 September 2026

Note: Flags indicate national team as defined under FIFA eligibility rules; some limited exceptions apply. Players may hold more than one non-FIFA nationality.

No.	Pos.	Nation	Player
1	GK	SWE	Tim Erlandsson (on loan from Elfsborg)
2	DF	DEN	Jacob Buus
3	DF	PHI	Josef Baccay
4	DF	NOR	Nikolas Walstad
5	DF	DEN	Hans Christian Bonnesen
6	DF	DEN	Jakob Vadstrup
7	MF	NOR	Filip Rønningen Jørgensen
8	MF	SWE	Daniel Söderberg
9	FW	NOR	Sanel Bojadzic
10	FW	DEN	Villads Rasmussen
12	GK	NOR	Idar Lysgård
13	DF	NOR	Samuel Skree Skjeldal
14	DF	NOR	Julian Gunnerød
15	DF	NOR	Oliver Svenungsen Skau

No.	Pos.	Nation	Player
16	DF	NOR	Casper Glenna Andersen
17	DF	NOR	Godwill Ambrose
18	MF	NOR	Syver Aas
19	FW	NGR	Abduljeleel Abdulateef
20	MF	NOR	Gard Simenstad
22	FW	DEN	Kasper Andersen
23	MF	NOR	Noah Kojo
24	GK	NOR	Storm Øines
26	FW	GHA	Abdul Zakaria Mugeese
27	MF	NGR	Mukhtar Adamu
28	FW	NOR	Faniel Tewelde (on loan from Lommel)
30	FW	NOR	Gabriel Occean
32	FW	NOR	Elion Krosa

For season transfers, see transfers winter 2024–25 and transfers summer 2025.

=== Out on loan ===
Note: Flags indicate national team as defined under FIFA eligibility rules; some limited exceptions apply. Players may hold more than one non-FIFA nationality.

No.	Pos.	Nation	Player

=== Coaching staff ===
Position	Name
Head coach	Per Frandsen
Assistant coach	Casper Aamodt
Assistant coach and player developer	Flamur Kastrati
Goalkeeper coach	Mats Mørch
Sport director	Morten Rønningen
Physical and mental coach	Mikkel Fillingsnes Marker
Physical therapist	Jonathan Brun Bar-Yaacov
Player logistic	Sebastian Nilsen
Equipment manager	Nils Thomas Strømdal
Team coordinator	Tore Andersen
Doctor	Ola Stamnes

== Honours ==
- Eliteserien:
  - Runners-up (2): 1950–51, 1956–57
- 1. divisjon:
  - Winners (2): 1998, 2008
- Norwegian Football Cup:
  - Winners (12) (Joint-Record): 1903, 1904, 1905, 1906, 1913, 1915, 1919, 1922, 1924, 1926, 1931, 2000
  - Runners-up (9): 1902, 1908, 1909, 1910, 1921, 1937, 1960, 2002, 2014

== Recent history ==
Season		Pos.	Pl.	W	D	L	GS	GA	P	Cup	Notes
2000	Tippeligaen	8	26	11	5	10	40	31	38	Winner	
2001	Tippeligaen	6	26	12	6	8	50	40	42	Semi-final	
2002	Tippeligaen	6	26	12	5	9	36	30	41	Final	
2003	Tippeligaen	4	26	11	5	10	46	43	38	Third round	
2004	Tippeligaen	8	26	9	8	9	47	44	35	Third round	
2005	Tippeligaen	9	26	9	6	11	28	51	33	Quarter-final	
2006	Tippeligaen	12	26	7	8	11	30	38	29	Third round	
2007	Tippeligaen	↓ 12	26	8	3	15	33	43	27	Semi-final	Relegated to the 1. divisjon
2008	1. divisjon	↑ 1	30	20	5	5	76	44	65	Semi-final	Promoted to the Tippeligaen
2009	Tippeligaen	4	30	12	10	8	53	44	46	Semi-final	
2010	Tippeligaen	5	30	12	10	8	48	41	46	Semi-final	
2011	Tippeligaen	5	30	14	6	10	44	44	48	Fourth round	
2012	Tippeligaen	10	30	11	7	12	40	43	39	Fourth round	
2013	Tippeligaen	7	30	11	7	12	43	39	40	Fourth round	
2014	Tippeligaen	3	30	17	7	6	52	32	58	Final	
2015	Tippeligaen	4	30	15	10	5	61	41	55	Quarter-final	
2016	Tippeligaen	3	30	15	6	9	44	35	51	Fourth round	
2017	Eliteserien	6	30	12	6	12	27	39	42	Fourth round	
2018	Eliteserien	9	30	11	7	12	39	38	40	Fourth round	
2019	Eliteserien	4	30	15	7	8	45	40	52	Semi-final	
2020	Eliteserien	7	30	13	4	13	52	51	43	Cancelled	
2021	Eliteserien	13	30	8	9	13	44	58	33	Fourth round	
2022	Eliteserien	5	30	13	6	11	43	45	45	Fourth round	
2023	Eliteserien	10	30	10	8	12	42	44	38	Third round	
2024	Eliteserien	↓ 16	30	5	8	17	26	54	23	Third round	Relegated to the 1. divisjon
2025	1. divisjon	9	30	8	9	13	37	50	33	First round	
2026	1. divisjon	5	30	14	7	9	60	48	49	First round	

== European record ==
=== Overview ===
As of 3 August 2017

Competition	S	P	W	D	L	GF	GA	GD
UEFA Europa League/UEFA Cup	5	24	11	5	8	37	32	+5
Total	5	24	11	5	8	37	32	+5

=== Matches ===
Season	Competition	Round	Opponent	1st Leg	2nd Leg	Aggregate
2001–02	UEFA Cup	1R	(Sweden) Helsingborgs IF	2–2	1–1	3–3 (a)
2004–05	UEFA Cup	2Q	(Lithuania) FK Ekranas	3–1	1–2	4–3
2004–05	UEFA Cup	1R	(Netherlands) Feyenoord	0–1	1–4	1–5
2015–16	UEFA Europa League	1Q	(Moldova) FC Sheriff Tiraspol	3–0	0–0	3–0
2015–16	UEFA Europa League	2Q	(Republic of Ireland) Shamrock Rovers	2–0	2–1	4–1
2015–16	UEFA Europa League	3Q	(Sweden) Elfsborg	1–2	2–0	3–2
2015–16	UEFA Europa League	PO	(Germany) Borussia Dortmund	3–4	2–7	5–11
2016–17	UEFA Europa League	1Q	(Finland) IFK Mariehamn	2–0	1–1	3–1
2016–17	UEFA Europa League	2Q	(Greece) PAS Giannina	0–3	3–1	3–4
2017–18	UEFA Europa League	1Q	(Northern Ireland) Ballymena United	3–0	2–0	5–0
2017–18	UEFA Europa League	2Q	(Liechtenstein) Vaduz	1–0	1–0	2–0
2017–18	UEFA Europa League	3Q	(Croatia) Dinamo Zagreb	1–2	0–0	1–2

Notes

- 1Q: First qualifying round
- 2Q: Second qualifying round
- 1R: First round
- PO. Play-off round

== Managers ==
- Lennart Söderberg (1983–84)
- Tore Andersen (1990)
- Paul Wilson (1991–93)
- Lars Borgar Waage (1994–97)
- Tom Nordlie (1998–99)
- Arne Sandstø (1 January 1999– 28 September 2007)
- Gaute Larsen (2005–07)
- Ove Flindt-Bjerg (28 September 2007 – 17 December 2007)
- Dag-Eilev Fagermo (17 December 2007 – 31 January 2020)
- Jan Frode Nornes (11 March 2020 – 8 January 2022)
- Pål Arne Johansen (24 January 2022 – 31 December 2023)
- Kenneth Dokken (16 January 2024 – 13 November 2024)
- Knut Rønningene (interim) (13 November 2024 – 10 December 2024)
- Knut Rønningene (10 December 2024 – 15 September 2025)
- Per Frandsen (17 September 2025 –)
