= Årstad IL =

Sports team/club in Bergen, Norway

Årstad Idrettslag is a Norwegian sports team and former association football club based in Årstad, Bergen.

It participated at the highest level of Norwegian football, Hovedserien, for several seasons, attracting average attendances of about 5,000.

The club also has handball and orienteering divisions. At present, most of the club's funds are directed towards handball, and the men's senior football team is defunct.
