= Selbak TIF =

Norwegian football club

- Full name: Selbak Turn & Idrettsforening
- Founded: 20 April 1919
- Ground: Selbak stadion, Sellebakk
- League: Third Division
Home colours

Selbak Turn & Idrettsforening is a Norwegian association football club from Sellebakk, Fredrikstad, Østfold.

It was founded on 20 April 1919. The club colors are green and white.

The men's football team currently plays in the Third Division, the fourth tier of Norwegian football. It last played in the Norwegian Second Division in 1997.
