= Kongsberg IF =

Norwegian sports club

- Full name: Kongsberg Idrettforening
- Founded: 1899
- Ground: Idrettsparken; Kongsberg

Kongsberg IF Fotball
Home colours

Kongsberg Idrettforening is a Norwegian sports club from Kongsberg, founded in 1899. It has sections for athletics, gymnastics, alpine skiing, ski jumping, cross country skiing, telemark skiing, snowboarding, speed skating, ice hockey, football, and cycling.

It is best known for its ski jumpers, including Sigmund Ruud, Birger Ruud, Asbjørn Ruud, Hans Beck, Hilmar Myhra, Petter Hugsted and Arnholdt Kongsgård. Snowboarder Stine Brun Kjeldaas also represented Kongsberg IF.

Its first national athletics team member was sprinter Erik Brofoss, who later served as Government Minister and as director in the International Monetary Fund system. Javelin thrower Bjørn Grimnes and decathlete Trond Skramstad, both former Olympic competitors, also represented Kongsberg IF.

The men's football team plays in the Third Division, the fourth tier of Norwegian football.
