= SK Rollon =

Norwegian sports club

Home colours

Sportsklubben Rollon is a Norwegian sports club from the city of Ålesund. The club was founded on 20 February 1914, which makes it the oldest club in the city. It is named after Rollo of Normandy. It has sections for football and handball.

The men's football team currently plays in the Fourth Division (fifth tier), after being relegated from the Third Division in 2010. Their roster featured former Liverpool defender John Arne Riise.
