= Eidsvold IF =

Norwegian football club

- Full name: Eidsvold Idrætsforening
- Founded: 5 July 1903
- Ground: Eidsvoll stadion, Råholt
- League: Third Division
- 2026: 1st (Fourth Division)

Eidsvold Idrætsforening is a Norwegian multi-sports club from Råholt, Eidsvoll. It has sections for association football, team handball and ski jumping.

The club was possibly founded in 1902, but officially counts 5 July 1903 as its founding date. The club colours were changed several times, lastly to red with black shorts.

The football team saw immediate success, reaching the semi-final of both the 1905 and 1906 Cup. The team continued as a mainstay in the cup, and won the district league in 1919, 1921 and 1933 (when Norway had no national league).

The handball section was founded in 1938, and thrived after gaining the indoor arenas Letohallen, arranging matches during the 1993 World Women's Handball Championship, and Råholthallen. The ski jumpers practised in Dalsbakken. A section for alpine skiing existed, but became defunct.

In recent times, the men's football team had stays in the Third Division, the fourth tier of football, in 1994–1995, 1998–1999 and 2004–2009. The team reached the first round of the cup in 2005, 2022 losing 0–7 to Lillestrøm, and 2026–27 losing 1–7 to Fredrikstad.

The men's football team currently plays in the Third Division, the fourth tier of football in Norway, having secured promotion from the 2026 Fourth Division. The club currently fields no women's team.
