= Lisleby FK =

Norwegian sports club

- Full name: Lisleby Fotballklubb
- Founded: 8 May 1920; 105 years ago
- Ground: Lisleby Stadion, Lisleby
- League: 4. divisjon
- 2022: 4. divisjon Østfold, 10th of 14
| Home colours | Away colours |

Lisleby Fotballklubb is a multi-sports club from Fredrikstad, Norway. The team plays football and athletics at Lisleby Stadion.

The club was founded as an association football club on 8 May 1920. Two years later, the club expanded with athletics, wrestling and boxing. From 1924, speed skating was also introduced. Wrestling was abandoned in 1927 and boxing in 1935. A handball team was established in 1949. In 1966, the football team played in the 1. divisjon, the top tier in Norwegian football.
