= Storms BK =

Norwegian football club

- Full name: Storms Ballklubb
- Founded: 12 July 1902
- League: Fourth Division
- 2011: Fourth Division/ Telemark, 6th 6th

Storms Ballklubb is a Norwegian association football club from Skien. Storm BK is the football-department of IF Storm and was founded on 12 July 1902. Storm was one of the best football-clubs in Grenland in the first years after the Second World War, and were playing in Hovedserien, the top league of Norwegian football, in 1948–49 and 1949–50. Today the club is playing in the Fourth Division, the fifth tier of the Norwegian league system. Anker Kihle and Johan Lauritzen have both been capped for Norway while playing for Storm.
