= IL Sverre =

Sports club in Norway

Idrettslaget Sverre
- Founded: 26 September 1886; 140 years ago
- Based in: Levanger, Norway
- Stadium: Eldberg Stadion
- Website: http://ilsverre.no/

Idrettslaget Sverre is a sports club located in Levanger, Norway. The club was founded on 26 September 1886, and today it has sections for football, gymnastics, tennis and cycling. The name originates from Birkebeiner king Sverre Sigurdsson.

== Football ==
=== History ===
In the 1956–57 season, Sverre competed in play-offs to win promotion to the 1957–58 Hovedserien, the top division in the Norwegian football league system. Sverre lost 3–5 on aggregate against Molde and were never promoted to the top flight. Sverre kept on playing in lower leagues until their last season as a senior team in the fourth tier 3. divisjon in the 1995 season. In 1996, the men's senior football team merged with SK Nessegutten and created Levanger FK. They currently have football sections for youths up to the age of 16 years.

=== Former footballers ===
Former footballers of IL Sverre include:

- Per Verner Rønning
- Kristoffer Paulsen Vatshaug

== Cycling ==
1972 Olympic track cycling champion Knud Knudsen represented IL Sverre.
