= SK Freidig =

Norwegian sports club

- Club logo
- Full name: Sportsklubben Freidig
- Sport: association football, team handball, orienteering, Nordic skiing
- Founded: 1903; 123 years ago
- Based in: Trondheim, Norway

SK Freidig
Home colours

Sportsklubben Freidig is a Norwegian sports club from Trondheim.

== Background ==
Founded in 1903, the club has sections for association football, team handball, orienteering and Nordic skiing. In football, it won the League of Norway 1947–48, and, in women's handball, the league in 1971 and 1985. The club has also won several medals in athletics, orienteering and skiing. The club won the women's relay at the Norwegian Orienteering Championships in 1964 and 1965. The senior football section currently plays in the 2nd Group of Trøndelag Region in 5th division, the 6th level of Norwegian League.

== Known athletes ==
- Harald Grønningen, Olav Lian, cross country skiing
- Arnfinn Bergmann (ski jumping)
- Magnar Solberg (biathlon)
- Ingrid Hadler, Stig Berge, Ola Skarholt (orienteering)
- Sissel Buchholdt (handball)
- Nils Uhlin Hansen, Kjell Hovik, Odd Bergh (athletics)
