= SK Brage =

Norwegian sports club

- Full name: Sportsklubben Brage
- Founded: 24 March 1907

Sportsklubben Brage was a Norwegian multi-sports club from Trondheim.

== History ==
It was founded on 24 March 1907. its sports included football, athletics, boxing and Nordic skiing. It was disbanded in 2009.

== Athletics ==
Arne Halse won an Olympic silver and bronze in 1908, and also competed in 1906 and 1912. Other Olympic athletes are John Johansen (1908), Otto Osen (1912) and Otto Monsen (1912; represented Hamar TF in 1908). Hjalmar Johannesen also represented the club for some years.

== Football ==
The men's football team played in the 1937–38 League of Norway, 1938–39 League of Norway, 1939–40 League of Norway, 1947–48 League of Norway and the 1959–60 Norwegian Main League.

== Boxing ==
The club was represented in the 1920 Olympics by boxers Aage Steen and Johan Sæterhaug.
