= Hamar IL =

Norwegian sports club

- Full name: Hamar Idrettslag
- Ground: Hamar stadion, Vikingskipet; Hamar

Hamar IL Fotball
Home colours

Hamar Idrettslag is a Norwegian sports club from Hamar. It has sections for bandy, curling, association football, athletics, sport shooting, rowing, speed skating, diving, swimming, tennis, figure skating and gymnastics.

It was founded in 1921 by the parties Hamar SK (founded 1901, speed skating), Hamar TF (founded 1896, gymnastics), Hamar SK (founded 1891, Nordic skiing), Hamar Game Club (founded 1903, tennis and cycling), Hamar FL (founded 1912, association football) and IF Tor (founded 1919, athletics and amateur boxing). New groups were added: bandy in 1933, orienteering in 1934, swimming in 1935, handball in 1945, sport shooting in 1948, basketball in 1975, diving in 1985, later curling and rowing. Several groups went defunct, some by forming their own club: the boxing group in Hamar IL ceased in 1951, orienteering in 1963, cycling in 1971, Nordic skiing in 1972, later handball and basketball.

Its ground Hamar stadion is used for athletics and ice sports, and was a prominent speed skating arena until it was replaced by the indoor Vikingskipet Olympic Arena. With Hamar being a central city in Norwegian speed skating, Hamar IL has been represented by many notable speed skaters, including Peter Sinnerud, Michael Staksrud, Hans Engnestangen, Ivar Martinsen, Dag Fornæss, Amund Sjøbrend and more recently Even Wetten and Eskil Ervik.

The men's football team of Hamar IL currently plays in the Fourth Division (fifth tier), but played in the Third Division from 2002 to 2010, with the exception of 2009. It is the second most prominent football team in Hamar, after Hamarkameratene.

The athletics section is largely down as of 2007, but in the past it has been represented by prominent javelin throwers. Odd Mæhlum reached the 1948 Olympic final whereas Egil Danielsen became 1956 Olympic champion. Also Arild Lenth competed in the 1928 Olympics.
