= List of Viking FK seasons =

Viking Fotballklubb is a Norwegian football club from the city of Stavanger. The club was founded in 1899. Viking have played in the top division since the league was established in 1937, except for the years 1966–67, 1987–88 and 2018. In total, Viking have played 68 seasons in the first tier and 5 seasons in the second tier of Norwegian football. No other clubs have played more seasons in the top flight. The club has never played lower than the second tier.

== Seasons ==
=== Regional league ===
Season	Regional league		Cup
Season	Division (Group)	Pos	Cup
1911	Kretsserien (Vesterlen)	2nd	DNQ
1912	Kretsserien (Vesterlen)	2nd	DNQ
1913	Kretsserien (Vesterlen)	2nd	DNQ
1914	Kretsserien (Vesterlen)	2nd	DNQ
1915	Kretsserien (Vesterlen)	w/d	DNQ
1916	Kretsserien (Vesterlen)	3rd	DNQ
1917	Kretsserien (Vesterlen)	4th	DNE
1918	Kretsserien (Vesterlen)	4th	1R
1919	Kretsserien (Vesterlen)	2nd	1R
1920	Kretsserien (Rogaland)	—	3R
1921	Kretsserien (Rogaland)	—	DNE
1922	Kretsserien (Rogaland)	—	2R
1923	Kretsserien (Rogaland)	—	1R
1924	Kretsserien (Rogaland)	—	1R
1925	Kretsserien (Rogaland)	—	SF
1926	Kretsserien (Rogaland)	1st	3R
1927	Kretsserien (Rogaland)	—	4R
1928	Kretsserien (Rogaland)	1st	4R
1929	Kretsserien (Rogaland)	1st	4R
1930	Kretsserien (Rogaland)	1st	QF
1931	Kretsserien (Rogaland)	—	4R
1932	Kretsserien (Rogaland)	1st	2R
1933	Kretsserien (Rogaland)	1st	RU
1934	Kretsserien (Rogaland)	1st	3R
1935	Kretsserien (Rogaland)	1st	SF
1936	Kretsserien (Rogaland)	1st	3R
1937	Kretsserien (Rogaland)	1st	QF

=== National league ===
Season	League											Cup	Other competitions	
Season	Division (Group)	Tier	Pld	W	D	L	GF	GA	GD	Pts	Pos	Cup	Other competitions	
1937–38	Norgesserien (Dist. V, B)	1	12	9	0	3	37	13	+24	18	1st (Note: Reached the quarter-finals of the championship play-offs)	QF		
1938–39	Norgesserien (Dist. V, B)	1	12	5	3	4	20	19	+1	13	3rd	SF		
1939–40	Norgesserien (Dist. V, B)	1	8	7	1	0	31	8	+23	15	1st (Note: The 1939–40 season was abandoned mid-season due to the German occupation of Norway)	4R		
1940–41	(Note: There was no league football between 1940 and 1947)											QF		
1945–46	(Note: There was no league football between 1940 and 1947)											4R		
1946–47	(Note: There was no league football between 1940 and 1947)											3R		
1947–48	Norgesserien (Dist. V, B)	1	12	9	1	2	29	8	+21	19	1st (Note: Reached the semi-finals of the championship play-offs)	RU		
1948–49	Hovedserien (A)	1	14	7	4	3	25	18	+7	18	3rd	SF		
1949–50	Hovedserien (A)	1	14	5	6	3	28	20	+8	16	3rd	3R		
1950–51	Hovedserien (A)	1	14	5	4	5	19	18	+1	14	4th	3R		
1951–52	Hovedserien (A)	1	14	5	5	4	21	19	+2	15	4th	QF		
1952–53	Hovedserien (A)	1	14	7	3	4	23	17	+6	17	4th	2R		
1953–54	Hovedserien (A)	1	14	4	5	5	19	20	−1	13	5th	W		
1954–55	Hovedserien (A)	1	14	6	3	5	23	24	−1	15	2nd	QF		
1955–56	Hovedserien (A)	1	14	5	5	4	25	26	−1	15	3rd	SF		
1956–57	Hovedserien (A)	1	14	5	5	4	19	15	+4	15	5th	SF		
1957–58	Hovedserien (A)	1	14	9	3	2	32	14	+18	21	1st (Note: Viking defeated the other group winner, Skeid, and thus won the championship.)	QF		
1958–59	Hovedserien (A)	1	14	7	3	4	25	17	+8	17	3rd	SF		
1959–60	Hovedserien (A)	1	14	6	4	4	25	18	+7	16	3rd	W		
1960–61	Hovedserien (A)	1	14	5	4	5	24	24	0	14	3rd	4R		
1961–62	Hovedserien	1	30	14	7	9	49	48	+1	35	7th	3R 3R		
1963	1. divisjon	1	18	6	5	7	26	37	−11	17	7th	SF		
1964	1. divisjon	1	18	5	4	9	22	37	−15	14	8th	1R		
1965	1. divisjon	1	18	5	3	10	20	32	−12	13	9th	QF		
1966	2. divisjon (B)	2	14	8	2	4	24	20	+4	18	2nd	SF		
1967	2. divisjon (A)	2	14	11	0	3	56	18	+38	22	1st	QF		
1968	1. divisjon	1	18	9	3	6	34	32	+2	21	3rd	1R		
1969	1. divisjon	1	18	6	6	6	18	17	+1	18	5th	QF		
1970	1. divisjon	1	18	8	3	7	27	20	+7	19	6th	3R		
1971	1. divisjon	1	18	9	4	5	41	20	+21	22	3rd	QF		
1972	1. divisjon	1	22	16	2	4	42	15	+27	34	1st	4R	UEFA Cup	2R
1973	1. divisjon	1	22	13	6	3	30	13	+17	32	1st	SF	European Cup	1R
1974	1. divisjon	1	22	11	9	2	31	10	+21	31	1st	RU	European Cup	1R
1975	1. divisjon	1	22	12	6	4	38	20	+18	30	1st	QF	European Cup	1R
1976	1. divisjon	1	22	6	10	6	24	21	+3	22	5th	3R	European Cup	1R
1977	1. divisjon	1	22	9	5	8	41	34	+7	23	5th	4R		
1978	1. divisjon	1	22	12	7	3	42	22	+20	31	3rd	SF		
1979	1. divisjon	1	22	13	6	3	31	16	+15	32	1st	W	UEFA Cup	1R
1980	1. divisjon	1	22	10	5	7	34	27	+7	25	4th	QF	European Cup	1R
1981	1. divisjon	1	22	11	6	5	32	30	+2	28	2nd	SF		
1982	1. divisjon	1	22	11	7	4	39	24	+15	29	1st	SF	UEFA Cup	2R
1983	1. divisjon	1	22	8	6	8	31	34	−3	22	6th	3R	European Cup	1R
1984	1. divisjon	1	22	9	7	6	33	23	+10	25	2nd	RU		
1985	1. divisjon	1	22	8	5	9	28	36	−8	21	7th	4R	UEFA Cup	1R
1986	1. divisjon	1	22	5	7	10	23	33	−10	17	11th	4R		
1987 (Note: The 1987 season saw the introduction of three points for a win.)	2. divisjon (A)	2	22	7	6	9	31	27	+4	32	8th	1R		
1988	2. divisjon (A)	2	22	14	3	5	56	25	+31	45	1st	4R		
1989	1. divisjon	1	22	9	4	9	36	33	+3	31	6th	W		
1990	Tippeligaen	1	22	10	5	7	41	30	+11	35	5th	4R	European Cup Winners' Cup	1R
1991	Tippeligaen	1	22	12	5	5	37	27	+10	41	1st	QF		
1992	Tippeligaen	1	22	4	9	9	25	34	−9	21	9th	SF	UEFA Champions League	1R
1993	Tippeligaen	1	22	13	2	7	38	27	+11	41	4th	4R		
1994	Tippeligaen	1	22	11	6	5	41	26	+15	39	3rd	4R		
1995	Tippeligaen	1	26	12	4	10	55	42	+13	40	5th	3R	UEFA Cup	1R
1996	Tippeligaen	1	26	12	7	7	50	32	+18	43	3rd	4R		
1997	Tippeligaen	1	26	8	10	8	42	34	+8	34	8th	SF	UEFA Cup	2QR
1998	Tippeligaen	1	26	14	4	8	66	44	+22	46	4th	4R		
1999	Tippeligaen	1	26	11	3	12	51	48	+3	36	8th	4R	UEFA Cup	2R
2000	Tippeligaen	1	26	13	6	7	51	39	+12	45	3rd	RU		
2001	Tippeligaen	1	26	14	7	5	43	29	+14	49	3rd	W	UEFA Cup	2R
2002	Tippeligaen	1	26	11	11	4	44	31	+13	44	4th	QF	UEFA Cup	2R
2003	Tippeligaen	1	26	9	10	7	46	34	+12	37	5th	4R		
2004	Tippeligaen	1	26	7	12	7	31	33	−2	33	9th	3R		
2005	Tippeligaen	1	26	12	5	9	37	32	+5	41	5th	4R	UEFA Cup	GS
2006	Tippeligaen	1	26	8	5	13	31	37	−6	29	11th	QF		
2007	Tippeligaen	1	26	14	5	7	50	40	+10	47	3rd	QF		
2008	Tippeligaen	1	26	11	6	9	38	32	+6	39	6th	4R	UEFA Cup	2QR
2009	Tippeligaen	1	30	9	11	10	38	40	−2	38	10th	3R		
2010	Tippeligaen	1	30	10	11	9	48	41	+7	41	9th	QF		
2011	Tippeligaen	1	30	9	10	11	33	40	−7	37	11th	QF		
2012	Tippeligaen	1	30	14	7	9	41	36	+5	49	5th	4R		
2013	Tippeligaen	1	30	12	10	8	41	36	+5	46	5th	3R		
2014	Tippeligaen	1	30	8	12	10	42	42	0	36	10th	QF		
2015	Tippeligaen	1	30	17	2	11	53	39	+14	53	5th	SF		
2016	Tippeligaen	1	30	12	7	11	33	35	−2	43	8th	3R		
2017	Eliteserien	1	30	6	6	18	33	57	−24	24	16th	2R		
2018	1. divisjon	2	30	20	1	9	68	44	+24	61	1st	2R		
2019	Eliteserien	1	30	13	8	9	55	42	+13	47	5th	W		
2020	Eliteserien	1	30	12	8	10	54	52	+2	44	6th	Cancelled	UEFA Europa League	2QR
2021	Eliteserien	1	30	17	6	7	60	47	+13	57	3rd	SF		
2022	Eliteserien	1	30	9	8	13	48	54	−6	35	11th	QF	UEFA Conference League	PO
2023	Eliteserien	1	30	18	4	8	61	48	+13	58	4th	4R		
2024	Eliteserien	1	30	16	9	5	61	39	+22	57	3rd	4R		
2025	Eliteserien	1	30	22	5	3	77	36	+41	71	1st	SF	UEFA Conference League	3QR
