= 1921 in Norwegian football =

Football in Norway
Men's football
- NM: Frigg

Results from Norwegian football in 1921.

== Class A of local Association Leagues ==
Class A of local association leagues (kretsserier) is the predecessor of a national league competition.

League	Champion
Østfold	Sarpsborg
Kristiania	Frigg
Aker	Hasle
Romerike	Eidsvold IF
Hamar og omegn	Hamar FL
Opland	Gjøvik/Lyn
Glommendalen	Kongsvinger
Nordre Østerdalen	Tynset
Buskerud	Drammens BK
Vestfold	Falk
Telemark	Odd
Aust-Agder	Grane (Arendal)
Vest-Agder	Start
Rogaland	Brodd
Hordaland	Hero
Bergen	Brann
Søndmøre	Aalesund
Romsdalske	Braatt
Sør-Trøndelag	Strinda
Trondhjem	Brage
Nord-Trøndelag	Sverre
Helgeland	Mosjøen
Lofoten og vesterålen	Narvik/Nor
Troms	Harstad
Finnmark	Vardø

== Norwegian Cup ==
=== Final ===
3 October 1920

Frigg	2–0	Odd
Semb-Thorstvedt 14'; Dahl 88'	Report

Vestre Holmen, Kristiania
Referee: Alf Lagesen (Drammens BK)

== National team ==
25 May 1921 Friendly	Norway	3–2	Finland	Kristiania, Norway
19:00 (UTC+1); Match 42	Berstad 30', 43'; Paulsen 48'	Report	Eklöf 15'; Mantila 31'	Stadium: Gressbanen; Attendance: 14,000; Referee: Ernst Albihn (Sweden)

19 June 1921 Friendly	Norway	3–1	Sweden	Kristiania, Norway
12:30 (UTC+1); Match 43	Gundersen 44'; Strøm 48'; Resberg 73'	Report	Kock 75'	Stadium: Gressbanen; Attendance: 15,000; Referee: John Howcroft (England)

18 September 1921 Friendly	Sweden	0–3	Norway	Stockholm, Sweden
12:30 (UTC+1); Match 44		Report	Gundersen 9'; Holm 19'; Wilhelms 44'	Stadium: Olympic Stadium; Attendance: 12,000; Referee: Lauritz Andersen (Denmark)

2 October 1921 Friendly	Denmark	3–1	Norway	Copenhagen, Denmark
13:30 (UTC+1); Match 45	Nielsen 7', 51', 75'	Report	Helgesen 64'	Stadium: Københavns Idrætspark; Attendance: 22,000; Referee: Arthur Björklund (Sweden)
