= Frigg Oslo FK =

Norwegian sports club

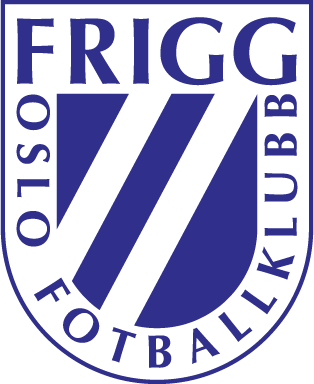
- Full name: Frigg Oslo Fotballklubb
- Founded: 17 May 1904; 122 years ago
- Ground: Tørteberg kunstgress 2
- Chairman: Geir Hustad
- Head coaches: Endre Opedal Theimann; Kristian Boyanson Belovsky
- League: Norwegian Third Division
- 2025: 2nd of 14, Group 1
- Website: https://www.frigg.no/
Home colours

Frigg Oslo Fotballklubb is a Norwegian sports club based at Majorstuen in Oslo. Founded on 17 May 1904 as Sportsklubben Frigg, it was named after Frigg, a goddess in Norse mythology. The club merged with Sportsklubben Varg in 1954 and adopted its present name in 1990.

The club is best known for association football, and also has a bandy section. Its men's football team has won the Norwegian Football Cup three times, in 1914, 1916 and 1921, and has played 15 seasons in the top tier of Norwegian football, most recently in 1973. Frigg's only appearance in international club competition came in the 1966–67 Inter-Cities Fairs Cup, where it lost 2–6 on aggregate to Dunfermline Athletic in the first round.

Today, most of Frigg's reported membership and activity is concentrated in children's and youth sport. In 2025, the club reported 1,681 registered members and active participants, including 1,329 under the age of 20. As of the 2026 season, the women's football team competes in the Norwegian First Division, the second tier of Norwegian women's football, while the men's team competes in the Norwegian Third Division, currently sponsored as Norsk Tipping-ligaen, the fourth tier of Norwegian men's football.

== History ==
=== Foundation and cup era (1904–1921) ===
Frigg was founded on 17 May 1904 as Sportsklubben Frigg. The club was named after Frigg, a goddess in Norse mythology, and originated in the Bislett, Fagerborg and Marienlyst neighbourhoods of Oslo.

The club achieved its first period of national prominence during the 1910s and early 1920s. Between 1914 and 1921, Frigg reached five Norwegian Cup finals, winning three. The club defeated Gjøvik-Lyn 4–2 in 1914 and Ørn 2–0 in 1916, before losing successive finals to Odd in 1919 and Ørn in 1920. Frigg won its third cup title with a 2–0 victory over Odd in 1921.

Einar Hansen and Trygve Smith appeared in all three of Frigg's cup-winning teams.

=== National league and post-war rise (1922–1964) ===
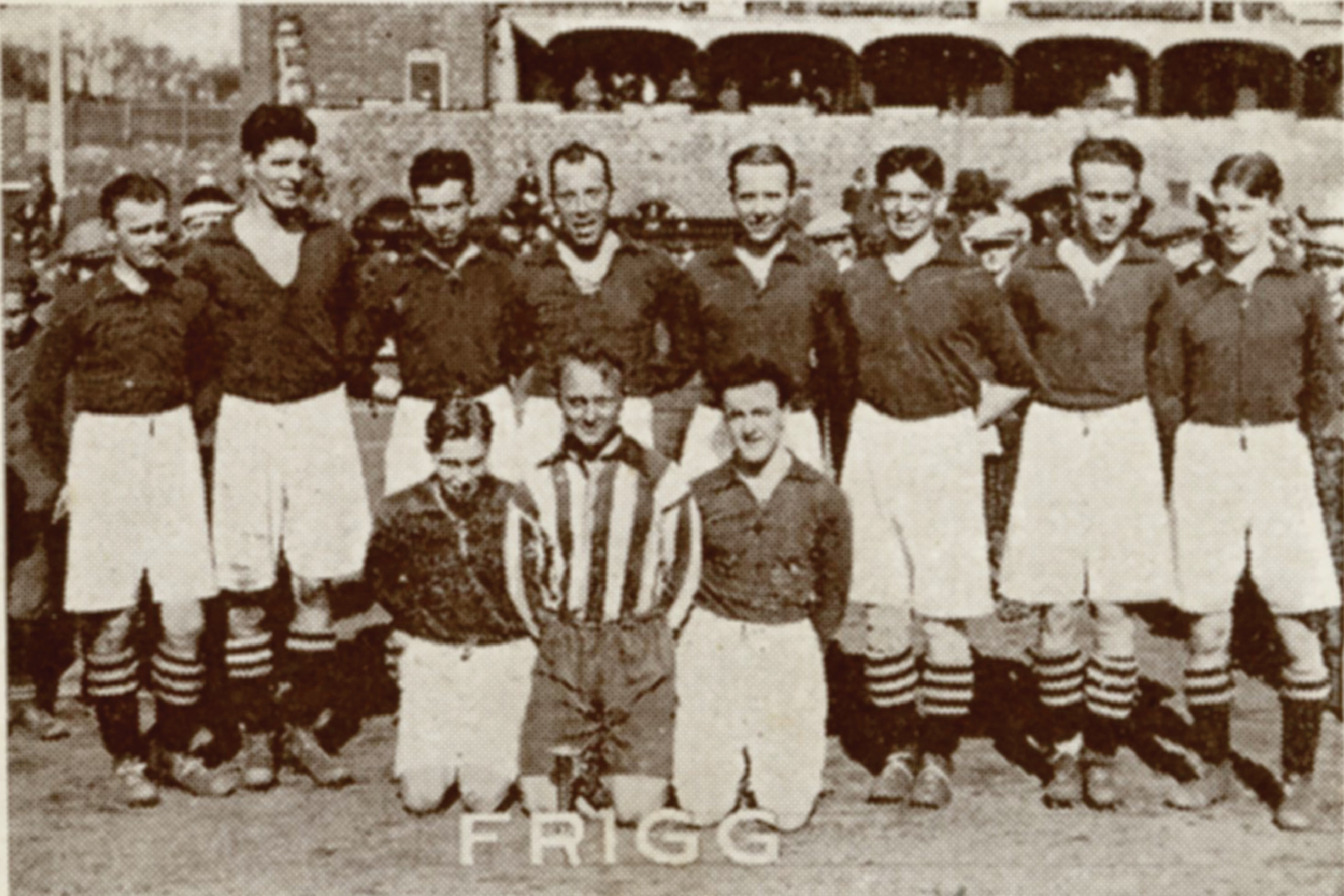
Frigg's football team, c. 1930

Frigg later became a regular participant in the national league system. The club played 15 seasons in the top tier between the introduction of the national championship structure in the late 1930s and its final top-flight season in 1973.

In 1954, Frigg merged with Sportsklubben Varg. The club adopted its present name, Frigg Oslo Fotballklubb, in 1990.

The men's team re-established itself in the top division during the early 1960s, finishing fourth in both 1962 and 1964.

Former Frigg player Per Pettersen later recalled that the team was known as Stjernelaget ("the Star Team"). According to Pettersen, the club was able to recruit several accomplished players who moved to Oslo for employment or education during the period.

=== The Trikkeserien, cup final and European football (1965–1973) ===
During the 1960s, the Norwegian top division was popularly referred to as Trikkeserien ("the Tram League"), reflecting the prominence of clubs from Oslo.

Frigg reached the Norwegian Cup final again in 1965, facing fellow Oslo club Skeid. The final required three matches to decide. The first two ended 2–2 and 1–1, before Skeid won the third match 2–1. Frigg subsequently finished fourth in the top division in both 1966 and 1967.

The club made its European debut in the 1966–67 Inter-Cities Fairs Cup. Frigg faced Scottish club Dunfermline Athletic in the first round, losing 3–1 in Oslo on 24 August 1966 and by the same score in Scotland on 28 September. Dunfermline advanced 6–2 on aggregate.

Pettersen was one of Frigg's leading players during the period. He earned 35 appearances for the Norway national football team, captained the national side on eight occasions and was named Norwegian Player of the Year by VG in 1973. He later served several spells as Frigg coach, initially alongside Egil Olsen from 1972 to 1974.

Frigg returned to the top division for single seasons in 1971 and 1973. The latter remains the club's most recent season at the highest level of Norwegian football.

=== Early role in women's football (1971–1986) ===
Frigg was involved in the early organisation of women's football in Norway. In 1971, Frigg, in cooperation with the newspaper Dagbladet, organised the first unofficial Norwegian championship for women's teams. Ellen Wille and Torgeir Røyert, both from Frigg, were central members of the organising committee, and Wille also participated as a player. Sixteen teams entered the inaugural tournament, which was won by the handball club Vestar.

Vestar also won the second unofficial championship in 1972. The competition grew from 16 participating teams in 1971 to 57 teams in 1977.

In 1975, Wille represented Frigg on a women's committee established by the Norwegian Football Federation. The committee worked to establish competitive opportunities for girls and women and to encourage women to become coaches, referees and football administrators. Women's football was formally accepted by the federation in 1976.

Pettersen became the first head coach of the Norway women's national football team in 1978 and remained in the position until 1982.

Wille became the first woman elected to the executive board of the Norwegian Football Federation in 1985. The following year, she addressed a FIFA Congress, criticising FIFA's limited investment in women's football and calling for the establishment of a women's world championship and the inclusion of women's football in the Olympic programme.

=== Life outside the top division (1974–2009) ===
Following the 1973 season, Frigg did not return to the top division. The club competed in the second tier from 1974 to 1980 and again from 1989 to 1991, with the intervening and subsequent years spent at lower levels of the Norwegian league system.

During the following decades, the men's team moved between several levels of the league system while the club continued its football and bandy activities in Oslo.

=== The Aadland era (2010–2024) ===
Magnus Aadland became a central figure in Frigg's sporting organisation during the 2010s and early 2020s. His formal responsibilities varied during the period and included coaching the men's senior team, sports coordination, sporting management and coach development. In October 2024, Dagsavisen described his departure from first-team coaching as the conclusion of 15 years as an A-team coach.

Aadland held a UEFA A Licence and qualifications as an NFF coach developer, coach mentor and grassroots-coach instructor. As Frigg's sporting director, he also contributed to the development of the club's coaches. In 2020, he presented Frigg's coach-mentoring structure at an NFF Oslo professional development gathering, explaining how the club used coach mentors to support its teams and implement its sporting plan.

During the period, Frigg won its Third Division group and gained promotion in 2015. The club achieved another promotion in 2021, winning its Norwegian Third Division group without defeat. Frigg recorded 11 wins and two draws in 13 matches, scoring 48 goals and conceding 10. The following season, the club was relegated from the Norwegian Second Division.

Local press associated Frigg with an attacking and high-scoring style of play during the period. In 2023, Dagsavisen referred to the team's established approach as "Magnus Aadland football". After eleven league matches that season, Frigg had scored 41 goals, the second-highest total among teams in the top four levels of Norwegian football. Frigg was also the highest-scoring team in its Third Division group in 2024, scoring 89 league goals.

Aadland led the men's senior team for the final time in October 2024 before leaving Frigg and later becoming head coach of Lyn.

=== New leadership and generational change (2025–present) ===
Endre Opedal Theimann and Kristian Boyanson Belovsky succeeded Aadland as joint head coaches of the men's senior team ahead of the 2025 season.

In their first season in charge, Frigg finished second in Group 1 of the Norwegian Third Division. The team won 19 of its 26 matches, scored 91 goals and finished nine points behind group winners Junkeren.

Ahead of the 2026 season, Trikkeligaen reported that the coaching team had carried out a further generational change in the playing squad following the departure of several established players.

=== Community-based sports club focusing on youth ===
Alongside the development of its senior teams, Frigg grew into a large community-based sports club with most of its activity concentrated in youth football and bandy. At the end of 2025, the club reported 1,681 registered members and active participants. Of these, 908 were aged between 6 and 12, while 421 were aged between 13 and 19.

Frigg's board reported that the club's membership and number of active players under the age of 20 had reached a new historical high in 2025.

The women's senior team also achieved promotion to the Norwegian First Division in 2025. Frigg's annual report described it as a historic promotion for the club.

== Grounds and facilities ==
=== Playing grounds ===
For much of its history, Frigg relied on shared municipal facilities in central and western Oslo rather than on a single permanent ground. A training schedule from 1916 assigned the club's teams to several venues during the same week, including Bislett Stadion and Gamle Frogner. The senior team also staged important matches at Bislett, Frogner Stadion and Ullevaal Stadion at different stages of the club's history.

==== Marienlyst and Friggfeltet ====
Frigg began concentrating its training activities at Marienlyst during the post-war period. Plans for a training complex were approved by the municipal sports committee in 1960, when drawings for an associated clubhouse, prepared by club member Kjell Arnesen, were presented to Frigg's annual meeting. Ground works began in 1961 and included clearing, drainage, the replacement of soil and the seeding of the playing areas. The Marienlyst training ground was officially opened on 31 May 1963 for the club's football and handball sections.

The clubhouse originally proposed for Marienlyst was not built. Frigg instead considered several alternatives for changing facilities, including an above-ground building and rooms connected to a proposed underground bowling centre. A changing facility was eventually completed at Marienlyst in 1967, and its opening was marked by a first-team match against Stabæk. The facility did not resolve the club's long-term requirements, and in 1971 Frigg was still seeking permanent changing rooms and a clubhouse beside its playing fields.

A further grass pitch outside Marienlyst School entered use in 1978. It was shared by the school during the day and Frigg in the evenings. Heavy use by the club and the public caused considerable wear, prompting the installation of fencing and attempts to control access to the surface.

The wider playing area around Marienlyst and Tørteberg, generally referred to by the club as Friggfeltet, was further developed during the 1980s and early 1990s. The work included drainage, resurfacing, floodlighting and the development of grass and gravel pitches, partly financed and carried out through club funds and voluntary labour. Four grass pitches and one gravel pitch were available when the improved grounds were officially opened on 29 August 1991. The men's first team nevertheless continued to stage its principal home fixtures elsewhere, including at Bislett.

==== Tørteberg 1 and Frogner Stadion ====
By the late 1990s, Frigg was campaigning for an artificial-turf pitch at Tørteberg. The project was included in Oslo Municipality's budget in 1997 and approved by the city council in 1998. Construction began in late April 1999, and the enclosed Tørteberg artificial-turf pitch was officially opened on 6 September. Matches and training sessions began immediately, although its floodlighting was not expected to be completed until the following spring.

Frigg used four grounds for its home league fixtures in 1999. Its first two home matches were played at Dælenenga and the Norwegian School of Sport Sciences, respectively. Most of the remaining home fixtures were staged at Marienlyst, which the club described as its home ground during the season. The final home league fixture was played at the newly opened Tørteberg pitch. The ground was later designated Tørteberg 1 as plans for a second artificial-turf pitch developed.

Frigg also remained involved in the redevelopment of Frogner Stadion. In 2007, the club reported that it had worked for eleven years to secure a combined artificial-ice and artificial-turf facility and was represented in the planning group together with Oslo Skøiteklub. The reconstructed stadium was completed for football in August 2010 and for bandy and skating later that year. Frogner supplemented rather than replaced the club's facilities at Marienlyst and Tørteberg.

==== Tørteberg 2 ====
Oslo City Council decided in 2009 to develop a second artificial-turf pitch at Tørteberg, with NOK 5 million allocated through the 2010 municipal budget. The proposal was delayed by land-use disputes and repeated planning procedures. Opponents sought to retain the open grass area for general recreation, while Frigg argued that severe pitch shortages were restricting activities for its growing membership. A complaint concerning the municipality's original planning procedure was upheld, requiring the application process to be restarted.

Construction of Tørteberg 2 eventually began in the autumn of 2019, approximately a decade after the initial political decision. The project included the removal and replacement of approximately 13,000 m^{3} (460,000 cu ft) of contaminated soil, new drainage and stormwater infrastructure, and foundations and infrastructure for floodlights. The pitch was completed in 2020 and officially opened on 31 October, with Oslo mayor Marianne Borgen attending the opening event.

The cancellation of the ordinary senior league season in 2020 meant that the opening did not immediately lead to a full season of competitive first-team football at the new ground. Competition resumed in 2021, when Frigg described Tørteberg 2 as a major addition to the club's facilities. Tørteberg 2 subsequently became the club's principal senior venue, replacing Tørteberg 1 for first-team home fixtures. Frigg currently states that the home matches of both its men's and women's senior first teams are played at Tørteberg 2, while Tørteberg 1 and Marienlyst remain in use for training and competitive matches.

=== Club premises ===
According to the club's centenary history, Frigg's earliest known clubrooms were situated in Schwensens gate. The club moved to premises in Welhavens gate around 1919, but retained them for only about a year. During the 1920s, it established more extensive premises at Norabakken. An account published in 1932 described the Norabakken premises as comprising a large hall, office, kitchen, changing and storage rooms and a billiards room. The facilities had been refurbished through voluntary work by club members.

The club later spent an extended period without permanent premises. Frigg's annual report for 1948 stated that it had been unable to rent a members' clubroom during the year. The club was offered an office in Idrettens Hus, but did not accept it because a telephone could not be installed. Membership meetings consequently had to be held at several separately rented venues.

In 1973, after what the club's annual report described as "many years without a home", Frigg obtained permanent club premises in the southern curve of Bislett Stadium. Former office rooms were converted through extensive voluntary work. By 1979, the premises covered approximately 120 m^{2} (1,300 sq ft) and included a meeting room, kitchen, boardroom, toilets, changing space and storage facilities. They were used for administration, committee meetings, club evenings, social events and external hire.

Although the Bislett premises became Frigg's administrative and social centre, the club continued to pursue a clubhouse beside its own playing fields. In 1990, Oslo Municipality had allocated an area near the Marienlyst school pitch for a proposed clubhouse and changing complex. The arrangement envisaged Frigg eventually returning the Bislett premises to the municipality, but the club was unwilling to relinquish them before a replacement had been secured.

Land ownership, planning restrictions and a proposed exchange of plots delayed the project during the early 1990s. Alternatives included temporary modular buildings and a permanent structure at Tørteberg. In 1994, Frigg reported what it described as a breakthrough: a combined clubhouse and childcare project had been included in Oslo Municipality's capital budget, and planning and building meetings had begun.

The new clubhouse at Gydas vei 14 was completed and entered operation in 1996. It contained changing rooms, clubrooms, offices and storage space for the club's teams, while its main function room could accommodate meetings and social events for up to 60 people. Frigg's annual meeting was held there in December 1996, and 1997 became the building's first full year of operation. Situated between the two Tørteberg pitches, the building continues to serve as Frigg's administrative and social centre and provides changing rooms, meeting space, storage and match-day facilities.

== European competition and foreign opposition ==
=== European record ===
Frigg's only appearance in an international club competition came in the 1966–67 Inter-Cities Fairs Cup. The club faced Dunfermline Athletic in the first round and lost both matches 1–3, resulting in a 2–6 aggregate defeat.

| Season | Competition | Round | Country | Club | Home | Away | Aggregate |
|---|---|---|---|---|---|---|---|
| 1966–67 | Inter-Cities Fairs Cup | First round | (Scotland) | Dunfermline Athletic | 1–3 | 1–3 | 2–6 |

=== Selected matches against foreign clubs ===
Frigg arranged numerous friendly, anniversary and tournament matches against foreign opposition, particularly before the introduction of organised European club competitions. The following table is a selection rather than a complete list, chosen for the matches' historical context, the prominence of the opposition or their significance in Frigg's club histories. Official European fixtures are excluded, as are matches played by city representative teams and combined elevens. Scores are listed with Frigg's score first.

Selected matches against foreign clubs
| Date | Opponent | Venue | Result | Context |
|---|---|---|---|---|
| 6 August 1916 | (Sweden) Hammarby IF | Stockholm, Sweden | 1–3 | One of Frigg's earliest fully documented matches abroad. |
| 1918 | (Sweden) IFK Göteborg | Oslo, Norway | 4–1 | Frigg defeated the club then commonly referred to in Norway as Göteborgskamraterna, shortly after a Kristiania representative side had lost to the same opposition. |
| 19 June 1924 | (Netherlands) Ajax | Bislett Stadium, Oslo | 1–2 | An international friendly in which Aftenposten considered Frigg the better side despite Ajax's victory. The match was attended by approximately 11,000 spectators. |
| 9 April 1950 | (Netherlands) Ajax | De Meer Stadion, Amsterdam | 0–8 | Semi-final of Ajax's 50th-anniversary tournament. Future Ajax and Netherlands coach Rinus Michels scored twice. |
| 31 August 1954 | (Hungary) Budapest Honvéd | Bislett Stadium, Oslo | 3–15 | Frigg's 50th-anniversary match, attended by approximately 30,000 spectators. The Honvéd side included Ferenc Puskás, Sándor Kocsis, Zoltán Czibor, József Bozsik and Gyula Grosics. |
| 14 August 1973 | (England) Arsenal | Ullevaal Stadion, Oslo | 1–0 | Egil Olsen scored the only goal in the third minute before an attendance of 8,899. |

Frigg players also appeared in a combined Lyn–Frigg eleven that faced Aston Villa in Oslo during the English club's first overseas tour in May 1926. Aston Villa won 11–2. As the Norwegian team was a combined selection rather than Frigg's official first team, the match is not included in the table.

== League record ==
Before the introduction of a nationwide league system, Norwegian league football was organised primarily by regional football associations. Frigg competed in the highest local division in Kristiania, later Oslo, and won the regional Class A championship on several occasions. During the late 1920s, the club also participated in the unofficial Østlandsligaen, which brought together leading clubs from several regional associations in Eastern Norway.

The first nationwide league competition was established with the Norgesserien in 1937–38. The season-by-season record below therefore begins with that competition. Because many historical leagues were divided into parallel districts, sections or groups, each position represents Frigg's placing within its section rather than an overall national ranking. The tier shown reflects the competition's place in the Norwegian football league system during the relevant season. The historical record is compiled from RSSSF Norway's season archive and divisional-movement index, while more recent seasons are checked against records published by NIFS and the Norwegian Football Federation.

Frigg men's national league record
| Season | Competition | Tier | Section or group | Pos. | Notes |
|---|---|---|---|---|---|
| 1937–38 | Norgesserien | 1 | District II, Group A | 5 | |
| 1938–39 | Norgesserien | 1 | District II, Group B | 3 | |
| 1939–40 | Norgesserien | 1 | District II, Group B | — | Season abandoned following the German occupation of Norway; Frigg stood second when play was halted. |
| 1940–41 | — | — | — | — | No national competition during World War II. |
| 1941–42 | — | — | — | — | No national competition during World War II. |
| 1942–43 | — | — | — | — | No national competition during World War II. |
| 1943–44 | — | — | — | — | No national competition during World War II. |
| 1944–45 | — | — | — | — | No national competition during World War II. |
| 1945–46 | — | — | — | — | No national league championship. |
| 1946–47 | Regional qualification leagues | — | Oslo | — | Regional qualifying competition; no national championship. |
| 1947–48 | Norgesserien | 1 | District II, Group B | 5 | Relegated following a restructuring of the league system. |
| 1948–49 | 1. divisjon | 2 | District II, Group A | 1 | Lost the promotion play-off to Strømmen. |
| 1949–50 | 1. divisjon | 2 | District II, Group A | 6 | Won the relegation play-off against Kongsberg. |
| 1950–51 | 1. divisjon | 2 | District II, Group B | 3 | |
| 1951–52 | Landsdelsserien | 2 | Østland/Nordre | 2 | |
| 1952–53 | Landsdelsserien | 2 | Østland/Nordre | 5 | |
| 1953–54 | Landsdelsserien | 2 | Østland/Nordre | 4 | |
| 1954–55 | Landsdelsserien | 2 | Østland/Nordre | 1 | Promoted. |
| 1955–56 | Hovedserien | 1 | Group B | 5 | |
| 1956–57 | Hovedserien | 1 | Group B | 6 | |
| 1957–58 | Hovedserien | 1 | Group A | 7 | Relegated. |
| 1958–59 | Landsdelsserien | 2 | Østland/Nordre | 2 | |
| 1959–60 | Landsdelsserien | 2 | Østland/Nordre | 6 | |
| 1960–61 | Landsdelsserien | 2 | Østland/Nordre | 1 | Promoted. |
| 1961–62 | Hovedserien | 1 | — | 4 | |
| 1963 | 1. divisjon | 1 | — | 5 | |
| 1964 | 1. divisjon | 1 | — | 4 | |
| 1965 | 1. divisjon | 1 | — | 8 | |
| 1966 | 1. divisjon | 1 | — | 4 | |
| 1967 | 1. divisjon | 1 | — | 4 | |
| 1968 | 1. divisjon | 1 | — | 9 | Relegated. |
| 1969 | 2. divisjon | 2 | Group B | 6 | |
| 1970 | 2. divisjon | 2 | Group A | 1 | Promoted. |
| 1971 | 1. divisjon | 1 | — | 10 | Relegated. |
| 1972 | 2. divisjon | 2 | Group B | 1 | Promoted. |
| 1973 | 1. divisjon | 1 | — | 10 | Relegated; Frigg's most recent top-flight season. |
| 1974 | 2. divisjon | 2 | Group B | 5 | |
| 1975 | 2. divisjon | 2 | Group A | 7 | |
| 1976 | 2. divisjon | 2 | Group B | 6 | |
| 1977 | 2. divisjon | 2 | Group A | 5 | |
| 1978 | 2. divisjon | 2 | Group B | 3 | |
| 1979 | 2. divisjon | 2 | Group B | 4 | |
| 1980 | 2. divisjon | 2 | Group A | 10 | Relegated. |
| 1981 | 3. divisjon | 3 | Group B | 6 | |
| 1982 | 3. divisjon | 3 | Group B | 5 | |
| 1983 | 3. divisjon | 3 | Group B | 10 | Relegated. |
| 1984 | 4. divisjon | 4 | Østland, Group C | 3 | |
| 1985 | 4. divisjon | 4 | Østland, Group A | 6 | |
| 1986 | 4. divisjon | 4 | Østland, Group A | 1 | Promoted. |
| 1987 | 3. divisjon | 3 | Group A | 7 | |
| 1988 | 3. divisjon | 3 | Group C | 1 | Promoted. |
| 1989 | 2. divisjon | 2 | Group B | 4 | |
| 1990 | 2. divisjon | 2 | Group A | 9 | |
| 1991 | 1. divisjon | 2 | Group A | 11 | Relegated. |
| 1992 | 2. divisjon | 3 | Group B | 7 | |
| 1993 | 2. divisjon | 3 | Group A | 11 | Relegated. |
| 1994 | 3. divisjon | 4 | Group 5 | 4 | |
| 1995 | 3. divisjon | 4 | Group 3 | 1 | Promoted. |
| 1996 | 2. divisjon | 3 | Group 1 | 5 | |
| 1997 | 2. divisjon | 3 | Group 1 | 11 | Relegated. |
| 1998 | 3. divisjon | 4 | Group 5 | 9 | |
| 1999 | 3. divisjon | 4 | Group 1 | 7 | |
| 2000 | 3. divisjon | 4 | Group 2 | 10 | |
| 2001 | 3. divisjon | 4 | Group 5 | 1 | Promoted through the play-offs. |
| 2002 | 2. divisjon | 3 | Group 2 | 9 | |
| 2003 | 2. divisjon | 3 | Group 1 | 6 | |
| 2004 | 2. divisjon | 3 | Group 1 | 7 | |
| 2005 | 2. divisjon | 3 | Group 2 | 13 | Relegated. |
| 2006 | 3. divisjon | 4 | Group 3 | 4 | |
| 2007 | 3. divisjon | 4 | Oslo, Group 2 | 1 | Lost the promotion play-off. |
| 2008 | 3. divisjon | 4 | Oslo, Group 2 | 2 | |
| 2009 | 3. divisjon | 4 | Oslo, Group 2 | 1 | Promoted through the play-offs. |
| 2010 | 2. divisjon | 3 | Group 1 | 9 | |
| 2011 | 2. divisjon | 3 | Group 2 | 6 | |
| 2012 | 2. divisjon | 3 | Group 4 | 8 | |
| 2013 | 2. divisjon | 3 | Group 2 | 12 | Relegated. |
| 2014 | 3. divisjon | 4 | Group 2 | 2 | |
| 2015 | 3. divisjon | 4 | Group 3 | 1 | Promoted. |
| 2016 | 2. divisjon | 3 | Group 3 | 11 | Relegated. |
| 2017 | 3. divisjon | 4 | Group 2 | 6 | |
| 2018 | 3. divisjon | 4 | Group 6 | 2 | |
| 2019 | 3. divisjon | 4 | Group 2 | 8 | |
| 2020 | 3. divisjon | 4 | Group 4 | — | Season cancelled because of the COVID-19 pandemic in Norway. |
| 2021 | 3. divisjon | 4 | Group 4 | 1 | Promoted. |
| 2022 | 2. divisjon | 3 | Group 2 | 14 | Relegated. |
| 2023 | 3. divisjon | 4 | Group 1 | 2 | |
| 2024 | 3. divisjon | 4 | Group 3 | 3 | |
| 2025 | Norsk Tipping-ligaen | 4 | Group 1 | 2 | |

== Players ==
=== Current squad ===
As of 4 July 2026.

Note: Flags indicate national team as defined under FIFA eligibility rules; some limited exceptions apply. Players may hold more than one non-FIFA nationality.

| No. | Pos. | Nation | Player |
|---|---|---|---|
| 1 | GK | NOR | David Nikolaisen Kanck |
| 3 | DF | NOR | Trygve Kvalbein Løberg |
| 5 | DF | NOR | Mikkel Kvinnesland |
| 7 | MF | NOR | Varg Ringdal Støvland |
| 8 | MF | NOR | Christian Halfstad Aagesen |
| 10 | MF | NOR | Benjamin Rio-Moe |
| 11 | FW | NOR | Eric Kanebog |
| 12 | GK | NOR | Julius Skrefsrud |
| 13 | MF | NOR | Jonas Knutsen Breen |
| 14 | DF | NOR | Erlend Haukvik Øya |
| 15 | MF | NOR | Edi Hockic |

| No. | Pos. | Nation | Player |
|---|---|---|---|
| 16 | DF | NOR | Varondeep Singh Gosal |
| 17 | MF | NOR | Kasper Wulff Iversen |
| 18 | FW | NOR | Adonai Mehary Kidane |
| 19 | MF | NOR | Kristoffer Kroglund Haugen |
| 21 | MF | NOR | Lars Nestaas Evensen |
| 22 | MF | NOR | Iker Carew Erazo Ormaza |
| 24 | GK | NOR | Ted Leo Løkke Botten |
| 26 | DF | NOR | Antoni Michal Ghali |
| 27 | MF | NOR | Steven Danh-Nguyen Nguyen |
| 28 | DF | NOR | Peder Olafsen Eriksson |

=== Norway senior internationals while at Frigg ===
Frigg's 2004 centenary history records 41 players who represented the Norway senior national team while playing for the club. Together, they made 186 senior international appearances as Frigg players. The centenary history only gives a separate career total where it differs from the number of caps earned while at Frigg; equal totals are repeated below for clarity. The final column gives the year of the player's first international appearance while representing Frigg.

Norway senior internationals while representing Frigg
| Player | Caps while at Frigg | Total Norway caps | First cap as a Frigg player |
|---|---|---|---|
| Per Pettersen | 35 | 35 | 1967 |
| Harald Hennum | 15 | 43 | 1949 |
| Trygve Arnesen | 11 | 15 | 1938 |
| Erik Hagen | 11 | 11 | 1962 |
| David Andersen | 9 | 9 | 1912 |
| Arne Møller | 9 | 9 | 1924 |
| Ragnvald Smedvik | 8 | 8 | 1914 |
| Einar Hansen | 6 | 6 | 1912 |
| Arne Kotte | 6 | 19 | 1958 |
| Jan Anders Hovdan | 6 | 6 | 1973 |
| Hans Dahl | 5 | 5 | 1924 |
| Arvid Syrrist | 5 | 5 | 1924 |
| Thøger Nordbø | 5 | 5 | 1928 |
| Birger Steen | 5 | 7 | 1926 |
| Tore Børrehaug | 5 | 9 | 1963 |
| Kristian Henriksen | 4 | 4 | 1934 |
| Sigurd Rasmussen | 3 | 3 | 1912 |
| Fritz Semb-Thorstvedt | 3 | 3 | 1918 |
| Ellef Mohn | 3 | 3 | 1920 |
| Harald Pettersen | 3 | 3 | 1930 |
| Torkel Trædal | 2 | 2 | 1914 |
| Rolf Semb-Thorstvedt | 2 | 2 | 1920 |
| Harald Finstad | 2 | 2 | 1921 |
| Håkon Gundersen | 2 | 2 | 1936 |
| Steinar Johannessen | 2 | 2 | 1959 |
| Svein Weltz | 2 | 2 | 1959 |
| Vidar Davidsen | 2 | 46 | 1979 |
| Bent Skammelsrud | 2 | 38 | 1989 |
| Thorbjørn Damgaard | 1 | 1 | 1912 |
| Georg Waitz | 1 | 1 | 1912 |
| Trygve Smith | 1 | 1 | 1917 |
| Sigmund Frogn | 1 | 1 | 1924 |
| Bjarne Olsen | 1 | 1 | 1925 |
| Kaare Lie | 1 | 1 | 1928 |
| Knut Andersen (born 1908) | 1 | 1 | 1930 |
| Arne Røisland | 1 | 1 | 1947 |
| Pål Angell-Hansen | 1 | 1 | 1953 |
| Wilhelm Eliassen | 1 | 1 | 1960 |
| Knut Andersen (born 1927) | 1 | 3 | 1961 |
| Anders Svela | 1 | 1 | 1962 |
| Tor Wæhler | 1 | 1 | 1971 |

=== Other senior internationals ===
The following players represented a senior national team during their careers and also played for Frigg's men's first team or youth teams, but did not earn senior international caps while registered with Frigg. Players already included in the table above are excluded.

Other senior internationals associated with Frigg
| Player | National team | Caps | Goals | Frigg association |
|---|---|---|---|---|
| Hallvar Thoresen | Norway | 50 | 9 | First-team player from 1988 to 1990, after the end of his international career. |
| Mikkel "Mix" Diskerud | United States | 38 | 6 | Youth player before joining Stabæk in 2005. |
| Arne Erlandsen | Norway | 22 | 1 | First-team player before joining Lillestrøm ahead of the 1979 season. |
| Egil Olsen | Norway | 16 | 0 | First-team player and coach from 1972 to 1974; his international playing career ended before he joined Frigg. |
| Ola Kamara | Norway | 17 | 7 | Youth player who made his senior debut for Frigg before moving to Stabæk in 2005. |

== First-team coaching staff ==
As of 4 July 2026.

Men's first-team coaching staff
| Position | Name |
|---|---|
| Joint head coaches | Endre Opedal Theimann; Kristian Boyanson Belovsky |

Theimann and Belovsky also serve as the club's sporting directors.

=== Managerial history ===
Frigg's centenary history provides a chronology of the men's first-team coaches from 1946 to 2004. The source's distinction between names separated by a slash and coaches listed with the word "and" has been retained below. Club annual reports and contemporary newspaper coverage extend the chronology from 2005.

Men's first-team coaches
| Period | Coach or coaches |
|---|---|
| 1946 | George Ainsley |
| 1947 | Leif Wolmer / Kenneth Rogeid |
| 1948 | Brede Borgen |
| 1949 | Brede Borgen and Leif Wolmer |
| 1950 | Leif Wolmer |
| 1951 | Egil Solvik and Eugen Svendsen |
| 1952 | Eugen Svendsen |
| 1953 | Kenneth Rogeid |
| 1954–55 | Roy Sørskott |
| 1956 | Knut Andersen |
| 1957 | Willem Carwung and Roy Sørskott |
| 1958 | Roy Sørskott |
| 1959 | Harald Hennum / Knut Andersen / Steinar Johannessen |
| 1960 | Harald Hennum / Steinar Johannessen |
| 1961 | Frank Soo |
| 1962 | Harald Hennum / Steinar Johannessen |
| 1963–65 | Harald Hennum |
| 1966 | Jan Tangen Fraug and Steinar Johannessen |
| 1967–68 | Steinar Johannessen |
| 1969 | Harald Hennum |
| 1970–71 | Finn Salvesen |
| 1972–74 | Per Pettersen / Egil Olsen |
| 1975 | Arve Mokkelbost and Per A. Sjøvold |
| 1976–77 | Ray Freeman |
| 1978 | Egil Olsen |
| 1979 | Egil Olsen / Per Pettersen |
| 1980 | Arvid Knutsen |
| 1981 | Arvid Knutsen and Egil Olsen |
| 1982–83 | Egil Olsen |
| 1984 | Hallvard Gimnes and Morten Haugen |
| 1985 | Morten Haugen |
| 1986 | Geir Amundsen, Dagfinn Røyert and Erik Foss |
| 1987 | Erik Foss and Per Pettersen |
| 1988–89 | Tor Røste Fossen / Tore Fyrand |
| 1990 | Torbjørn Brobakken and Tore Fyrand |
| 1991 | Terje Nilsen |
| 1992 | Vidar Davidsen and Kjell Malmerengen |
| 1993 | Tor Røste Fossen / Kjell Malmerengen |
| 1994–95 | Tor Røste Fossen / Arnfinn Isaksen |
| 1996 | Tor Røste Fossen / Erling Sigmundstad |
| 1997 | Tor Røste Fossen / Arnfinn Isaksen |
| 1998 | Ari Kallioniemi |
| 1999 | Torgeir Lind |
| 2000 | Torgeir Lind / Stig Johansen |
| 2001–04 | Viggo Strømme / Steinar Andorsen |
| 2005–07 | Viggo Strømme |
| 2008–10 | Ole Kristian Vikan |
| 2011–24 | Magnus Aadland |
| 2025–present | Endre Theimann and Kristian Belovsky |

== Honours ==
=== Football ===
==== Men's team ====
- Norwegian Football Cup

 ** Winners (3): 1914, 1916, 1921
 ** Runners-up (3): 1919, 1920, 1965[11]

==== Women's team ====
- Norwegian Second Division

 ** Promotion play-off winners (1): 2025[107]

==== Norwegian Cup-winning players ====
The following 23 players were listed by the Norwegian Football Federation as members of Frigg's three Norwegian Cup-winning teams. Players are ordered by number of titles and then alphabetically.

| Player | Titles | Winning years |
|---|---|---|
| Einar Hansen | 3 | 1914, 1916, 1921 |
| Trygve Smith | 3 | 1914, 1916, 1921 |
| Arne Wendelborg | 2 | 1914, 1916 |
| David Andersen | 2 | 1914, 1916 |
| Fritz Semb-Thorstvedt | 2 | 1916, 1921 |
| Ragnvald Smedvik | 2 | 1914, 1916 |
| Thorbjørn Damgaard | 2 | 1914, 1916 |
| Yngvar Kopsland | 2 | 1914, 1916 |
| Birger Eriksen | 1 | 1921 |
| Bjarne Olsen | 1 | 1916 |
| Ellef Mohn | 1 | 1921 |
| Gelland Nilsen | 1 | 1921 |
| Georg Deans | 1 | 1921 |
| Georg Hartmann-Hansen | 1 | 1916 |
| Georg Waitz | 1 | 1916 |
| Gustav Magnussen | 1 | 1921 |
| Hans Dahl | 1 | 1921 |
| Rolf Nestor | 1 | 1914 |
| Rolf Semb-Thorstvedt | 1 | 1921 |
| Sigurd Rasmussen | 1 | 1914 |
| Thorleif Limseth | 1 | 1914 |
| Torkel Trædal | 1 | 1914 |
| Yngvar Tørnros | 1 | 1921 |

=== Handball ===
- Norwegian women's championship

 ** Champions (2): 1962, 1964[109]

=== Bandy ===
- Norwegian championship

 ** Runners-up (4): 1917, 1923, 1947, 1948[110]

== Bandy ==
The men's bandy team played four cup finals in 1917, 1923, 1947 and 1948 but lost all. They were relegated from the 1st division (2nd tier) after the 2019/2020 season.
