= 1920 in Norwegian football =

Football in Norway
Men's football
- NM: Ørn

Results from Norwegian football in 1920.

== Class A of local Association Leagues ==
Class A of local association leagues (kretsserier) is the predecessor of a national league competition. From 1920 the local association boundaries closely follows those of the counties in Norway.

League	Champion
Østfold	Sarpsborg
Kristiania	Frigg
Aker	Hasle
Romerike	Norrøna
Hamar og omegn	Fagforeningenes IL (Hamar)
Opland	Gjøvik/Lyn
Glommendalen	Kongsvinger IL
Nordre Østerdalen	Ytre Rendal
Buskerud	Drafn
Vestfold	Ørn
Telemark	Urædd
Aust-Agder	Grane (Arendal)
Vest-Agder	Start
Rogaland	Stavanger IF
Bergen og omegn	Brann
Søndmøre	Aalesund
Romsdalske	Braatt
Sør-Trøndelag	Strinda
Trondhjem	Freidig
Nord-Trøndelag	Sverre
Helgeland	Glimt
Lofoten og vesterålen	Fart
Troms	Harstad
Finnmark	Vadsø Turn

== Norwegian Cup ==
=== Final ===
17 October 1920

Ørn	1–0	Frigg
Paulsen 68'	Report

Vestre Holmen, Kristiania
Attendance: 10,000
Referee: Fredrik Schieldrop (Minde)

== National team ==
13 June 1920 Friendly	Norway	1–1	Denmark	Kristiania, Norway
19:30 (UTC+1); Match 36	Gundersen 10'	Report	Andersen 42'	Stadium: Gressbanen; Attendance: 14,000; Referee: Ernst Albihn (Sweden)

27 June 1920 Friendly	Norway	0–3	Sweden	Kristiania, Norway
13:00 (UTC+1); Match 37		Report	Andersson 10'; Bergström 22'; Karlsson 65'	Stadium: Gressbanen; Attendance: 14,000; Referee: Hagbard Vestergaard (Denmark)

28 August 1920 1920 Summer Olympics; First round	Norway	3–1	Great Britain	Antwerp, Belgium
15:30 (UTC+1); Match 38	Gundersen 13', 51'; Wilhelms 63'	Report	Nicholas 25'	Stadium: Olympisch Stadion; Attendance: 5,000; Referee: Johannes Mutters (Netherlands)

29 August 1920 1920 Summer Olympics; Quarter-finals	Czechoslovakia	4–0	Norway	Brussels, Belgium
16:30 (UTC+1); Match 39	Vaník 8'; Janda 17', 66', 77'	Report		Stadium: La Butte; Attendance: 4,000; Referee: Charles Barette (Belgium)

31 August 1920 1920 Summer Olympics; Play-off	Italy	2–1 (a.e.t.)	Norway	Antwerp, Belgium
10:00 (UTC+1); Match 40	Sardi 46'; Badini 96'	Report	Andersen 41'	Stadium: Stadion Broodstraat; Attendance: 500; Referee: Louis Fourgous (France)

26 September 1920 Friendly	Sweden	0–0	Norway	Stockholm, Sweden
14:00 (UTC+1); Match 41		Report		Stadium: Olympic Stadium; Attendance: 16,000; Referee: Willem Boas (Netherlands)
