= 1962 Norwegian Football Cup =

Norgesmesterskapet i fotball for menn 1962

Tournament details
- Country: Norway
- Teams: 128 (main competition)

Final positions
- Champions: Gjøvik-Lyn (1st title)
- Runners-up: Vard

The 1962 Norwegian Football Cup was the 57th season of the Norwegian annual knockout football tournament. The tournament was open for all members of NFF, except those from Northern Norway. Fredrikstad were the defending champions, but they were eliminated by the second-tier team Vard in the quarterfinal.

The final was played at Ullevaal Stadion in Oslo on 28 October 1962, and was contested between two second-tier teams, Gjøvik-Lyn and Vard. This was Vard's first appearance in a cup final, while it was Gjøvik-Lyn's second final, having lost the 1914 final. Gjøvik-Lyn secured their first title with a 2–0 victory against Vard, and qualified for the 1963–64 European Cup Winners' Cup.

== First round ==
Team 1	Score	Team 2
Arna	4–0	Trane
Asker	1–0	BFG
Brage	3–0	Orkanger
Clausenengen	2–1	Fremtid
Dahle	3–4	Braatt
Drammens BK	3–0	Sagene
Eik	3–0	Falk
Falken	4–1	Kristiansund
Fjellkameratene	1–2	Djerv
Frigg	2–1 (a.e.t.)	Sprint/Jeløy
Geithus	9–1	Kjapp
Gjøvik-Lyn	5–0	Jevnaker
Grane (Arendal)	1–2	Sørfjell
Hafslund	2–1	Sparta
HamKam	2–4 (a.e.t.)	Brumunddal
Hasselvika	3–6	Freidig
Haugar	5–2	Stord
Heddal	2–3	Nedenes
Herkules	1–4 (a.e.t.)	Odd
Hødd	5–0	Velledalen/Ringen
Jarl	2–3	Bryne
Kvik (Trondheim)	5–0	Røros
Langevåg	3–1	Rollon
Larvik Turn	1–0	Borg
Lisleby	3–1	Kvik (Halden)
Lue	4–6	Fremad Lillehammer
Moelven	1–7	Lillestrøm
Molde	5–1	Skarbøvik
Moss	0–1	Røa
Nessegutten	0–0 (a.e.t.)	Nidelv
Odda	1–0	Nordnes
Orkdal	2–2 (a.e.t.)	Ranheim
Os	1–2	Buøy
Pors	3–1	Vigør
Randaberg	0–2	Viking
Raufoss	4–0	Redalen
Raumnes & Årnes	0–4	Kapp
Sandaker	1–3	Drafn
Sandefjord BK	6–0	Storm
Sarpsborg	2–1	Navestad
Selbak	1–2 (a.e.t.)	Greåker
Skiens-Grane	6–1	Jerv
Slemmestad	2–0	Mjøndalen
Skarnes	1–2	Aurskog
Ski	1–1 (a.e.t.)	Rapid
Skiold	1–6	Ørn
Spartacus	0–4	Lyn
Stag	1–2	Fram (Larvik)
Start	0–2	Runar
Stavanger	2–1 (a.e.t.)	Egersund
Steinkjer	4–0	Sverre
Strømmen	2–1	Lena
Tune	1–4	Fredrikstad
Ulf	2–1	Flekkefjord
Ull/Kisa	0–2	Skeid
Vard	7–0	Fana
Varegg	2–4	Brann
Verdal	1–2	Rosenborg
Vestfossen	2–0	Åssiden
Vindbjart	5–1	Ulefoss
Vålerengen	1–1 (a.e.t.)	Hamar
Østsiden	2–1	Askim
Aalesund	2–1	Måløy
Årstad	3–2	Jotun
Replay
Hamar	2–3 (a.e.t.)	Vålerengen
Nidelv	1–0	Nessegutten
Ranheim	w/o	Orkdal
Rapid	4–2	Ski

== Second round ==
Team 1	Score	Team 2
Aurskog	0–4	Lisleby
Braatt	2–1 (a.e.t.)	Brage
Brann	6–0	Arna
Brumunddal	2–1	Strømmen
Bryne	4–0	Vindbjart
Buøy	2–8	Viking
Djerv	1–0	Haugar
Drafn	2–0	Sandefjord BK
Eik	4–1	Skiens-Grane
Falken	0–1	Rosenborg
Fram (Larvik)	1–0	Frigg
Freidig	1–2	Aalesund
Fremad Lillehammer	1–7	Raufoss
Fredrikstad	2–1	Slemmestad
Greåker	3–0	Asker
Kapp	1–3	Sarpsborg
Langevåg	4–2	Hødd
Lillestrøm	6–1	Clausenengen
Lyn	7–0	Geithus
Molde	0–3	Gjøvik-Lyn
Nidelv	1–0	Kvik (Trondheim)
Odd	2–0	Drammens BK
Ranheim	0–1	Steinkjer
Rapid	2–1	Larvik Turn
Runar	0–2	Østsiden
Røa	0–1	Vålerengen
Skeid	5–0	Hafslund
Stavanger	1–0	Årstad
Sørfjell	2–4	Pors
Ulf	2–1	Nedenes
Vard	6–0	Odda
Ørn	4–1	Vestfossen

== Third round ==
Team 1	Score	Team 2
12 August 1962
Sarpsborg	3–1	Ørn
Lisleby	4–1	Fram (Larvik)
Østsiden	3–1	Odd
Vålerengen	2–1	Rapid
Lillestrøm	4–3 (a.e.t.)	Greåker
Gjøvik-Lyn	6–1	Langevåg
Raufoss	1–3	Lyn
Drafn	2–1	Skeid
Eik	1–0	Stavanger
Pors	2–5	Fredrikstad
Ulf	0–1	Brann
Viking	2–2 (a.e.t.)	Bryne
Djerv	0–6	Vard
Aalesund	1–0	Nidelv
Rosenborg	4–0	Braatt
Steinkjer	3–0	Brumunddal
Replay: 15 August 1962
Bryne	2–1	Viking

== Fourth round ==
Team 1	Score	Team 2
2 September 1962
Fredrikstad	4–2	Lillestrøm
Lyn	1–2	Østsiden
Drafn	2–3 (a.e.t.)	Rosenborg
Gjøvik-Lyn	6–1	Lisleby
Bryne	2–3 (a.e.t.)	Vålerengen
Vard	1–0	Eik
Brann	0–0 (a.e.t.)	Aalesund
Steinkjer	1–1 (a.e.t.)	Sarpsborg
Replay: 5 September 1962
Aalesund	1–2	Brann
Replay: 6 September 1962
Sarpsborg	2–0	Steinkjer

== Quarter-finals ==
Team 1	Score	Team 2
23 September 1962
Vålerengen	2–4	Gjøvik-Lyn
Vard	2–1	Fredrikstad
Rosenborg	2–1	Brann
Sarpsborg	2–1	Østsiden

== Semi-finals ==
Team 1	Score	Team 2
7 October 1962
Rosenborg	2–3	Vard
Gjøvik-Lyn	1–1 (a.e.t.)	Sarpsborg
Replay: 17 October 1962
Sarpsborg	1–1 (a.e.t.)	Gjøvik-Lyn
2nd replay: 24 October 1962
Gjøvik-Lyn	3–2 (a.e.t.) (Note: Played at Bislett Stadion in Oslo.)	Sarpsborg

== Final ==
28 October 1962

Gjøvik-Lyn	2–0	Vard
Backe 20', 62'	Report

Ullevaal Stadion, Oslo
Attendance: 31,157
Referee: Georg Dragvoll (Brage)

== See also ==
- 1961–62 Norwegian Main League
- 1962 in Norwegian football
