= 1919 Norwegian Football Cup =

Norgesmesterskapet i fotball for menn 1919

Tournament details
- Country: Norway
- Teams: 53

Final positions
- Champions: Odd (7th title)
- Runners-up: Frigg

Tournament statistics
- Matches played: 52

The 1919 Norwegian Football Cup was the 18th season of the Norwegian annual knockout football tournament. The tournament was open for all members of NFF. Odd won their seventh title, having beaten Frigg in the final. Kvik (Fredrikshald) were the defending champions, but were eliminated by Fram (Larvik) in the quarterfinal.

== First round ==
| Team 1 | Score | Team 2 |
|---|---|---|
7 September 1919
| Brage | 2–1 | Hamar FL |
| Brann | 2–1 | Trygg |
| Brodd | 1–3 (a.e.t.) | Lyn |
| Braatt | 6–4 | Kristiansund |
| Donn | 3–1 | Viking |
| Drammen | 3–2 | Larvik Turn |
| Fram | 2–1 | Sportsklubben av 1910 |
| Frigg | 5–1 | Kristiania-Kameratene |
| Kjapp (Rjukan) | 5–4 | Sandefjord |
| Kongsvinger | 2–6 | Kristiania BK |
| Kvik (Fredrikshald) | 5–1 | Storm |
| Neset | 0–3 | Freidig |
| Ready | 2–6 | Urædd |
| Sarpsborg | 11–0 | Lillestrøm |
| Skiold | 4–2 | Lyn (Gjøvik) |
| Skotfos | 4–2 | Agnes |
| Norrøna | 1–3 (a.e.t.) | Moss |
| Tønsberg Turn | 2–0 | Mercantile |
| Tønset | 2–5 | Sverre |
| Ørn | 7–0 | Pors |
| Aalesund | 3–2 (a.e.t.) | Fremad |

== Second round ==
| Team 1 | Score | Team 2 |
|---|---|---|
7 September 1919
| Donn | 2–10 | Start |
| Drammen | 2–1 | Sarpsborg |
| Fram (Larvik) | 4–0 | Skotfos |
| Fredrikstad | 0–2 | Ørn |
| Freidig | 2–1 | Eidsvold |
| Frem (Bergen) | 0–5 | Stavanger |
| Frigg | 6–1 | Mjøndalen |
| Kristiania BK | 2–1 | Brann |
| Kvik (Fredrikshald) | 1–0 | Tønsberg Turn |
| Lyn | 10–1 | Skiold |
| Moss | 1–4 | Drafn |
| Odd | 4–0 | Snøgg |
| Urædd | 0–1 | Kjapp (Rjukan) |
| Sverre | 3–2 | Brage |
| Vidar | 6–0 | Hardy |
| Aalesund | 3–2 | Braatt |

== Third round ==
| Team 1 | Score | Team 2 |
|---|---|---|
7 September 1919
| Ørn | 0–1 | Odd |
| Vidar | 2–5 | Stavanger |
| Kvik (Fredrikshald) | 6–0 | Start |
| Frigg | 2–0 | Drammen |
| Kjapp | 1–4 | Fram (Larvik) |
| Drafn | 0–2 | Lyn |
| Eidsvold | 1–2 | Kristiania |
| Sverre | 3–0 | Aalesund |

== Quarter-finals ==
| Team 1 | Score | Team 2 |
|---|---|---|
28 September 1919
| Odd | 1–0 | Stavanger |
| Fram (Larvik) | 2–1 | Kvik (Fredrikshald) |
| Lyn | 8–0 | Kristiania BK |
| Frigg | 3–0 | Sverre |

== Semi-finals ==
| Team 1 | Score | Team 2 |
|---|---|---|
5 October 1919
| Odd | 1–0 | Fram (Larvik) |
| Frigg | 3–1 | Lyn |

== Final ==
12 October 1919

| Odd | 1–0 | Frigg |
|---|---|---|
| Gundersen 13' | Report |

Fram sportsplass, Larvik
Attendance: 10,000
Referee: Peder Christian Andersen (Kristiania BK)

Odd:
| GK | Ingolf Pedersen |
| DF | Thaulow Goberg |
| DF | Peder Henriksen |
| MF | H. Halvorsen |
| MF | Per Haraldsen |
| MF | Tidemann Nilsen |
| FW | Nils Thorstensen |
| FW | Haakon Haakonsen |
| FW | Sverre Andersen |
| FW | Einar Gundersen |
| FW | Jonas Aas |

Frigg:
| GK | Asbjørn Aamodt |
| DF | Rolf Thorstvedt |
| DF | Yngvar Tørnros |
| MF | Jens Olsen |
| MF | Ellef Mohn |
| MF | Gellon Nielsen |
| FW | Trygve Smith |
| FW | David Andersen |
| FW | Per Bekkedahl |
| FW | Bjarne Olsen |
| FW | Frithjof Resberg |

== See also ==
- 1919 in Norwegian football
