= 1916 in Norwegian football =

Football in Norway
Men's football
- NM: Frigg

Results from Norwegian football (soccer) in the year 1916.

== Prøveligaen 1914–1916 (Unofficial) ==
Pos	Team	Pld	W	D	L	GF	GA	GD	Pts
1	Odd	10	10	0	0	34	12	+22	20
2	Frigg	10	5	2	3	23	14	+9	12
3	Kvik (Fredrikshald)	8	3	3	2	17	17	0	9
4	Drafn	10	3	1	6	18	26	−8	7
5	Mercantile	8	2	0	6	14	26	−12	4
6	Larvik Turn	8	0	2	6	9	20	−11	2

Source: RSSSF Norway

- Note: Results of Kvik - Larvik Turn, Larvik Turn - Mercantile and Mercantile - Kvik are unknown.

== Class A of local association leagues ==
Class A of local association leagues (kretsserier) is the predecessor of a national league competition. The champions qualify for the 1916 Norwegian Cup.

=== Smaalenene ===
Pos	Team	Pld	W	D	L	GF	GA	GD	Pts
1	Kvik (Fredrikshald)	6	6	0	0	37	7	+30	12
2	Sarpsborg	6	3	0	3	10	17	−7	6
3	Fredrikstad	6	3	0	3	19	23	−4	6
4	Moss	6	0	0	6	4	23	−19	0

Source: RSSSF Norway

=== Kristiania og omegn ===
==== Group 1 ====
Pos	Team	Pld	W	D	L	GF	GA	GD	Pts
1	Frigg	4	4	0	0	22	7	+15	8
2	Ready	4	1	1	2	10	8	+2	3
3	Sportsklubben 1910	4	0	1	3	5	22	−17	1

Source: RSSSF Norway

==== Group 2 ====
Pos	Team	Pld	W	D	L	GF	GA	GD	Pts
1	Mercantile	4	2	1	1	7	8	−1	5
2	Lyn	4	2	0	2	11	6	+5	4
3	Trygg	4	1	1	2	6	10	−4	3

Source: RSSSF Norway

==== Championship final ====
Team 1	Score	Team 2
Frigg	4–2	Mercantile

=== Romerike ===
Pos	Team	Pld	W	D	L	GF	GA	GD	Pts
1	Norrøna	6	4	2	0	11	4	+7	10
2	Eidsvold IF	6	3	1	2	11	7	+4	7
3	Lierfoss	6	2	1	3	6	11	−5	5
4	Bøn	6	1	0	5	8	14	−6	2

Source: RSSSF Norway

=== Oplandene ===
Pos	Team	Pld	W	D	L	GF	GA	GD	Pts
1	Lyn (Gjøvik)	6	6	0	0	40	10	+30	12
2	Hamar FL	6	4	0	2	39	11	+28	8
3	Elverum	17	1	4	12	35	–	—	6
4	Kapp	6	0	1	5	2	37	−35	1

Source: RSSSF Norway

=== Vestfold ===
Pos	Team	Pld	W	D	L	GF	GA	GD	Pts
1	Ørn	6	5	1	0	24	4	+20	11
2	Drafn	6	1	1	4	8	22	−14	3
3	Drammens BK	6	1	1	4	8	22	−14	3
4	Skiold	6	1	0	5	11	27	−16	2

Source: RSSSF Norway

=== Grenland ===
==== Group 1 ====
Pos	Team	Pld	W	D	L	GF	GA	GD	Pts
1	Fram (Larvik)	4	2	2	0	15	4	+11	6
2	Odd	4	2	2	0	13	3	+10	6
3	Pors	4	0	0	4	3	24	−21	0

Source: RSSSF Norway

==== Position play-offs ====
Team 1	Score	Team 2
Fram (Larvik)	1–0	Odd

==== Group 2 ====
Pos	Team	Pld	W	D	L	GF	GA	GD	Pts
1	Larvik Turn	4	3	0	1	11	6	+5	6
2	Storm	4	2	0	2	8	6	+2	4
3	Urædd	4	1	0	3	4	11	−7	2

Source: RSSSF Norway

==== Championship final ====
- Fram (Larvik) won championship final against Larvik Turn on walkover.

=== Telemark ===
Pos	Team	Pld	W	D	L	GF	GA	GD	Pts
1	Snøgg	4	4	0	0	27	2	+25	8
2	Rjukan	4	0	1	3	3	17	−14	1
3	Skotfoss	4	0	1	3	3	17	−14	1

Source: RSSSF Norway

=== Sørlandske ===
- Start champion.

Table unknown

=== Vesterlen ===
Pos	Team	Pld	W	D	L	GF	GA	GD	Pts
1	Stavanger IF	6	6	0	0	31	6	+25	12
2	Brodd	6	1	3	2	10	18	−8	5
3	Viking	6	1	2	3	7	21	−14	4
4	Vidar	6	1	1	4	14	17	−3	3

Source: RSSSF Norway

=== Bergen og omegn ===
Pos	Team	Pld	W	D	L	GF	GA	GD	Pts
1	Brann	6	6	0	0	30	7	+23	12
2	Nornen	6	4	0	2	17	21	−4	8
3	Drott	6	2	0	4	11	21	−10	4
4	Viking (Bergen)	6	0	0	6	3	12	−9	0

Source: RSSSF Norway

=== Romsdalske ===
Pos	Team	Pld	W	D	L	GF	GA	GD	Pts
1	Rollon	3	3	0	0	10	5	+5	6
2	Aalesund	3	2	0	1	10	8	+2	4
3	Braatt	3	1	0	2	8	9	−1	2
4	Molde	3	0	0	3	5	11	−6	0

Source: RSSSF Norway

=== Trondhjem ===
Pos	Team	Pld	W	D	L	GF	GA	GD	Pts
1	Brage	6	5	1	0	–	–	—	11
2	Rapp	6	2	1	3	–	–	—	5
3	Freidig	6	2	1	3	–	–	—	5
4	Kvik (Trondheim)	6	1	1	4	–	–	—	3

Source: RSSSF Norway

=== Inn-Trøndelagen ===
Pos	Team	Pld	W	D	L	GF	GA	GD	Pts
1	Sverre	6	4	2	0	25	10	+15	10
2	Blink	6	3	1	2	17	17	0	7
3	Varden (Meråker)	6	2	0	4	5	17	−12	4
4	Neset	6	1	1	4	5	8	−3	3

Source: RSSSF Norway

== Norwegian Cup ==
=== Final ===
8 October 1916

Frigg	2–0	Ørn
Smedvik 70'; Andersen 71'	Report

Skøitebanen, Trondhjem
Attendance: 4,000
Referee: Peder Christian Andersen (Kristiania BK)

== National team ==
25 June 1916 Friendly	Norway	0–2	Denmark	Kristiania, Norway
13:00 (UTC+2); Match 18		Report	Rohde 75', 82'	Stadium: Frogner stadion Attendance: 12,000; Referee: Erik Alstam (Sweden)

2 July 1916 Friendly	Sweden	6–0	Norway	Stockholm, Sweden
14:00 (UTC+1); Match 19	Karlstrand 25'; Gustafsson 30', 61', 80'; Wicksell 50'; Svensson 65'	Report		Stadium: Stockholm Olympic Stadium; Attendance: 6,000; Referee: Hagbard Vestergaard (Denmark)

3 September 1916 Friendly	Norway	1–1	United States	Kristiania, Norway
18:00 (UTC+2); Match 20	Engebretsen 50'	Report	Ellis 75'	Stadium: Frogner stadion Attendance: 12,000; Referee: Ernst Albihn (Sweden)

1 October 1916 Friendly	Norway	0–0	Sweden	Kristiania, Norway
13:00 (UTC+1); Match 21		Report		Stadium: Frogner stadion Attendance: 12,000; Referee: Hagbard Vestergaard (Denmark)

15 October 1916 Friendly	Denmark	8–0	Norway	Copenhagen, Denmark
13:30 (UTC+1); Match 22	Rohde 2', 10', 57'; Olsen 12'; Nielsen 25', 40', 47', 70'	Report		Stadium: Københavns Idrætspark; Attendance: 10,000; Referee: Erik Alstam (Sweden)
