= 1921 Norwegian Football Cup =

Norgesmesterskapet i fotball for menn 1921

Tournament details
- Country: Norway
- Teams: 43 (overall); 22 (qualifying competition); 32 (main competition)

Final positions
- Champions: Frigg (3rd title)
- Runners-up: Odd

The 1921 Norwegian Football Cup was the 20th season of the Norwegian annual knockout football tournament. The tournament was open for all members of NFF. This was the third consecutive year that Frigg played in the final, but after having lost the previous two they won 2–0 against Odd in this year's final and won their third title. Ørn were the defending champions, but were eliminated by Brann in the quarterfinal.

== Qualifying round ==
Team 1	Score	Team 2
Donn	2–0	Grane
Fagforeningenes IL (Hamar)	7–3	Kirkenær
Falk	17–0	Hasle
Hafslund	8–2	Nordstrand
Lillestrøm	1–3	Kristiania-Kameratene
Mjøndalen	3–2	Sportsklubben av 1910
Pors	3–0	Halsen BK
Rapp	4–1	Neset
Rollon	2–1	Molde
Storm	3–1 (a.e.t.)	Start
Sverre	2–2 (a.e.t.)	Tryggkameratene
Replay
Tryggkameratene	0–2	Sverre

== First round ==
Team 1	Score	Team 2
Aalesund	3–0	Rollon
Brodd	2–3	Djerv
Donn	0–4	Urædd
Drafn	5–2	Hafslund
Fram (Larvik)	4–1	Fagforeningenes IL (Hamar)
Fredrikstad	4–1	Drammen
Frem (Bergen)	2–4	Vidar
Kristiania-Kameratene	1–4	Torp
Kristiansund	1–2	Freidig
Larvik Turn	5–1	Kristiania BK
Lyn (Gjøvik)	6–1	Eidsvold
Mercantile	6–1	Agnes
Mjøndalen	3–2	Tønsberg Turn
Trygg	2–2 (a.e.t.)	Moss
Odd	6–2	Kjapp
Pors	w/o	Snøgg
Rapp	6–0	Elverum
Ready	2–1	Falk
Sandefjord	0–5	Kvik (Fredrikshald)
Skiold	4–1	Fremad
Stabæk	7–2	Norrøna
Stavanger	1–0	Ulf
Sverre	6–0	Røros
Tønset	2–3	Hamar
Brage	Bye	
Brann	Bye	
Frigg	Bye	
Lyn	Bye	
Sarpsborg	Bye	
Skotfos	Bye	
Storm	Bye	
Ørn	Bye	
Replay
Moss	2–1	Trygg

== Second round ==
Team 1	Score	Team 2
Aalesund	5–2 (a.e.t.)	Rapp
Brage	2–4	Lyn (Gjøvik)
Brann	9–1	Djerv
Fram (Larvik)	1–3 (a.e.t.)	Kvik (Fredrikshald)
Frigg	5–4 (a.e.t.)	Larvik Turn
Hamar	2–2 (a.e.t.)	Mercantile
Moss	3–0	Pors
Mjøndalen	1–1 (a.e.t.)	Odd
Sarpsborg	10–0	Torp
Skiold	3–2 (a.e.t.)	Ready
Stabæk	0–1	Fredrikstad
Stavanger	2–1	Vidar
Storm	1–2	Lyn
Sverre	3–1	Freidig
Urædd	0–3	Drafn
Ørn	5–1	Skotfos
Replay
Mercantile	2–1 (Note: The replay was also played in Hamar.)	Hamar
Odd	5–1	Mjøndalen

== Third round ==
Team 1	Score	Team 2
Drafn	6–0	Sverre
Fredrikstad	1–4	Brann
Lyn	0–1	Ørn
Lyn (Gjøvik)	5–2	Aalesund
Mercantile	0–3	Sarpsborg
Moss	2–1	Kvik (Fredrikshald)
Odd	3–0	Skiold
Stavanger	0–3	Frigg

== Quarter-finals ==
Team 1	Score	Team 2
Brann	3–1	Ørn
Frigg	3–0	Lyn (Gjøvik)
Moss	2–5	Odd
Sarpsborg	4–1	Drafn

== Semi-finals ==
Team 1	Score	Team 2
Sarpsborg	2–2 (a.e.t.) (Note: Both games were played in Fredrikstad.)	Frigg
Odd	1–0	Brann
Replay
Frigg	2–1	Sarpsborg

== Final ==
3 October 1920

Frigg	2–0	Odd
Semb-Thorstvedt 14'; Dahl 88'	Report

Vestre Holmen, Kristiania
Referee: Alf Lagesen (Drammens BK)

Frigg:
Gustav Magnussen
Birger Eriksen
Yngvar Tørnros
Georg Deans
Ellef Mohn
Fritz Semb Thorstvedt
Einar Hansen
Hans Dahl
Gelland Nilsen
Rolf Semb Thorstvedt
Trygve Smith

Odd:
GK	Ingolf Pedersen
DF	Thaulow Goberg
DF	Peder Henriksen
MF	Unknown
MF	Unknown
MF	Unknown
FW	Nils Thorstensen
FW	Haakon Haakonsen
FW	Bertel Ulrichsen
FW	Einar Gundersen
FW	Unknown

== See also ==
- 1921 in Norwegian football
