= 1951 Norwegian Football Cup =

Norgesmesterskapet i fotball for menn 1951

Tournament details
- Country: Norway
- Teams: 128 (main competition)

Final positions
- Champions: Sarpsborg (6th title)
- Runners-up: Asker

The 1951 Norwegian Football Cup was the 46th season of the Norwegian annual knockout football tournament. The tournament was open for all members of NFF, except those from Northern Norway. The final was played at Ullevaal Stadion in Oslo on 21 October 1951, and was contested by five-time former winners Sarpsborg and Asker, who made their first appearance in the cup final. Sarpsborg won the final 3–2, after extra time, and secured their sixth title. Fredrikstad were the defending champions, but were eliminated by Vålerengen in the quarter-final.

== First round ==
Team 1	Score	Team 2
Askim	1–0	Lisleby
Borg	0–1	Grane (Arendal)
Brage	4–3	Rosenborg
Brann	1–1 (a.e.t.)	Djerv
Brevik	2–4	Herkules
Clausenengen	1–3	Braatt
Djerv 1919	0–4	Os
Drafn	3–1	Liull
Eik	2–1	Storm
Flekkefjord	5–2 (a.e.t.)	Vindbjart
Fram (Larvik)	1–0	Berger
Fredrikstad	6–0	Sørli
Freidig	1–2	Sverre
Fremad Lillehammer	2–0	Strong
Furuset	1–8	Vålerengen
Geithus	6–0	Sterling
Hamar	9–0	Hof
Hødd	1–2	Aalesund
Kapp	1–2	Galterud
Klepp	0–4	Bryne
Kristiansund	0–3	Troll
Kvik (Halden)	4–1	Tune
Kvik (Trondheim)	5–0	Heimdal
Lillestrøm	3–0	Mesna
Lyn	3–1	Kjelsås
Mandalskameratene	1–3	Jerv
Minde	0–2	Baune
Molde	5–0	Ørsta
Neset	2–3	Falken
Nessegutten	0–1 (a.e.t.)	Ranheim
Nordnes	2–0	Stavanger
Odd	4–0	Flint
Pors	5–1	Rjukan
Rapid	6–1	Holmestrand
Raufoss	1–3 (a.e.t.)	Jevnaker
Raumnes & Årnes	0–7	Asker
Rollon	1–2	Spjelkavik
Rygge	0–4	Frigg
Sagene	4–1	Mysen
Sandaker	8–2	Borgen
Sandefjord BK	1–1 (a.e.t.)	Skiens-Grane
Selbak	4–0	Sprint-Jeløy
Skeid	5–1	Haga
Skiens BK	0–0 (a.e.t.)	Tønsberg Turn
Skiold	0–3	Moss
Skreia	1–4	Gjøvik-Lyn
Snøgg	1–2	Mjøndalen
Solberg	2–1	Skotfoss
Sparta	6–0	Tistedalen
Stag	0–1	Drammens BK
Start	3–2	Nærbø
Steinkjer	11–2	Tryggkam
Strømmen	6–0	Bjørkelangen
Sørfjell	3–0	AIK Lund
Tollnes	0–6	Larvik Turn
Torp	1–5	Sarpsborg
Vang	2–3	Brumunddal
Vard	4–0	Stord
Varegg	6–1	Fana
Varg	1–2	HamKam
Viking	4–1	Randaberg
Ørn	4–2	Vestfossen
Ålgård	2–0	Ulf
Årstad	2–0	Florvåg
Replay
Djerv	0–2	Brann
Skiens-Grane	1–2	Sandefjord BK
Tønsberg Turn	0–1	Skiens BK

== Second round ==
Team 1	Score	Team 2
Asker	5–1	Hamar
Askim	0–4	Sandaker
Brann	1–2	Varegg
Brumunddal	0–5	Lyn
Bryne	1–2	Ålgård
Drammens BK	2–3	Selbak
Falken	2–4	Kvik (Trondheim)
Fremad Lillehammer	4–3 (a.e.t.)	Lillestrøm
Frigg	8–0	Kvik (Halden)
Gjøvik-Lyn	2–0	Molde
Grane (Arendal)	0–3	Odd
HamKam	2–1	Strømmen
Herkules	0–1	Fram (Larvik)
Jerv	1–0	Flekkefjord
Jevnaker	3–1	Drafn
Larvik Turn	2–0 (a.e.t.)	Sørfjell
Mjøndalen	4–6 (a.e.t.)	Start
Moss	0–0 (a.e.t.)	Eik
Os	1–2	Årstad
Pors	1–6	Sparta
Ranheim	4–0	Braatt
Sagene	3–4	Fredrikstad
Sandefjord BK	3–2	Solberg
Sarpsborg	3–0	Galterud
Skeid	3–1	Geithus
Skiens BK	3–2	Ørn
Steinkjer	0–2	Troll
Sverre	2–3	Brage
Vard	1–2	Baune
Viking	1–0	Nordnes
Vålerengen	3–1	Rapid
Aalesund	4–1	Spjelkavik
Replay
Eik	3–2	Moss

== Third round ==
Team 1	Score	Team 2
12 August 1951
Sparta	0–2	Jevnaker
Selbak	2–1	Skiens BK
Fredrikstad	3–2 (a.e.t.)	Larvik Turn
Lyn	1–3	Varegg
Sandaker	3–2 (a.e.t.)	Sandefjord BK
HamKam	2–4	Kvik (Trondheim)
Gjøvik-Lyn	3–5	Vålerengen
Eik	2–4	Skeid
Fram (Larvik)	1–2 (a.e.t.)	Asker
Odd	3–5	Frigg
Start	6–1	Jerv
Ålgård	0–0 (a.e.t.)	Viking
Baune	2–1	Årstad
Aalesund	3–1 (a.e.t.)	Troll
Ranheim	2–0	Fremad Lillehamer
Brage	1–1 (a.e.t.)	Sarpsborg
Replay: 26 August 1951
Viking	3–2	Ålgård
Sarpsborg	3–0	Brage

== Fourth round ==
Team 1	Score	Team 2
26 August 1951
Vålerengen	5–1	Baune
Frigg	1–0	Skeid
Asker	2–0	Ranheim
Jevnaker	0–5	Fredrikstad
Varegg	2–2 (a.e.t.)	Selbak
Kvik (Trondheim)	2–4 (a.e.t.)	Sandaker
'16 September 1951
Sarpsborg	1–0	Aalesund
Viking	4–1	Start
Replay: 16 September 1951
Selbak	1–0	Varegg

== Quarter-finals ==
Team 1	Score	Team 2
23 September 1951
Fredrikstad	3–5	Vålerengen
Selbak	2–3 (a.e.t.)	Asker
Frigg	1–0	Viking
Sandaker	2–4	Sarpsborg

== Semi-finals ==
Team 1	Score	Team 2
7 October 1951
Vålerengen	0–1	Asker
Sarpsborg	2–0	Frigg

== Final ==
21 October 1951

Sarpsborg	3–2 (a.e.t.)	Asker
Johansen 18'; Nilsen 81', 103'	Report	Fossli 2'; Wettre-Johnsen 34'

Ullevaal Stadion, Oslo
Attendance: 30,639
Referee: Folke Bålstad (Mercantile/Trygg)

== See also ==
- 1950–51 Norwegian Main League
- 1951 in Norwegian football
