= 1920 Norwegian Football Cup =

Norgesmesterskapet i fotball for menn 1920

Tournament details
- Country: Norway
- Teams: 42

Final positions
- Champions: Ørn (1st title)
- Runners-up: Frigg

Tournament statistics
- Matches played: 41

The 1920 Norwegian Football Cup was the 19th season of the Norwegian annual knockout football tournament. The tournament was open for all members of NFF. Ørn won their first title, having beaten Frigg in the final. This was second consecutive year that Frigg lost the final.

== First round ==
Team 1	Score	Team 2
Brage	2–1	Freidig
Brann	5–1	Vidar
Drammen	1–2	Trygg
Fram	7–0	Nordstrand
Fremad	4–1	Kvik (Trondhjem)
Hamar FL	2–5	Drafn
Kristiania BK	5–0	FF IL Hamar
Kvik (Fredrikshald)	7–0	Skiold
Lillestrøm	1–5	Ørn
Lyn	5–1	Larvik Turn
Lyn (Gjøvik)	5–6	Frigg
Sandefjord	2–4	Mercantile
Sarpsborg	2–1	Urædd
Skotfos	3–3 (Note: The replay was moved to the second round.)	Snøgg
Sportsklubben av 1910	2–3	Kristiania-Kameratene
Start	2–0	Stavanger
Storm	6–0	Ready
Sverre	3–2	Rapp
Tønsberg Turn	2–1	Odd
Viking	5–4	Frem (Bergen)
Aalesund	w/o	Braatt

== Second round ==
Team 1	Score	Team 2
Brage	2–1	Aalesund
Drafn	7–1	Kristiania BK
Fram (Larvik)	9–1	Kristiania-Kameratene
Skotfos	2–0	Snøgg
Storm	3–0	Tønsberg Turn
Trygg	3–1	Sverre
Brann	Bye	
Fremad	Bye	
Frigg	Bye	
Kvik (Fredrikshald)	Bye	
Lyn	Bye	
Mercantile	Bye	
Sarpsborg	Bye	
Start	Bye	
Viking	Bye	
Ørn	Bye	

== Third round ==
Team 1	Score	Team 2
19 September 1920
Lyn	12–0	Mercantile
Brann	6–1	Viking
Brage	1–0	Fremad
Frigg	5–1	Drafn
Sarpsborg	4–2	Fram (Larvik)
Ørn	4–0	Kvik (Fredrikshald)
Start	1–3	Storm
Skotfoss	2–0	Trygg

== Quarter-finals ==
Team 1	Score	Team 2
3 October 1920
Ørn	5–1 (a.e.t.)	Storm
Sarpsborg	3–1	Skotfoss
Frigg	3–2 (a.e.t.)	Brann
Brage	0–1	Lyn

== Semi-finals ==
Team 1	Score	Team 2
10 October 1920
Ørn	2–0	Sarpsborg
Frigg	2–1	Lyn

== Final ==
17 October 1920

Ørn	1–0	Frigg
Paulsen 68'	Report

Vestre Holmen, Kristiania
Attendance: 10,000
Referee: Fredrik Schieldrop (Minde)

Ørn:
GK	Thorbjørn Falkenberg
DF	Kristian Johnsen
DF	Leif Andersen
MF	Reidar Høilund
MF	Emil Hansen
MF	Fritz Amundsen
FW	Egil Jacobsen
FW	Michael Paulsen
FW	Harald Pedersen
FW	Ingar Pedersen
FW	Gudmund Fredriksen

Frigg:
GK	Gustav Magnussen
DF	Arne Bjørklund
DF	Yngvar Tørnros
MF	Jens Olsen
MF	Ellef Mohn
MF	Fritz Semb Thorstvedt
FW	Per Bekkedahl
FW	Hans Dahl
FW	Bjarne Olsen
FW	Rolf Semb Thorstvedt
FW	Trygve Smith

== See also ==
- 1920 in Norwegian football
