= 1916 Norwegian Football Cup =

Norgesmesterskapet i fotball for menn 1916

Tournament details
- Country: Norway
- Teams: 13

Final positions
- Champions: Frigg (2nd title)
- Runners-up: Ørn

Tournament statistics
- Matches played: 12
- Goals scored: 63 (5.25 per match)

The 1916 Norwegian Football Cup was the 15th season of the Norwegian annual knockout football tournament. The tournament was open for 1916 local association leagues (kretsserier) champions. Frigg won their second title, having beaten Ørn in the final.

== First round ==
Team 1	Score	Team 2
9 September 1916
Brann	2–3 (a.e.t.)	Stavanger
Rollon	1–7	Lyn (Gjøvik)
Snøgg	0–6	Ørn
Start	0–1	Fram (Larvik)
Sverre	2–3	Brage
13 September 1916
Frigg	3–1	Norrøna

- Kvik (Fredrikshald) had a walkover.

== Second round ==
Team 1	Score	Team 2
17 September 1916
Brage	0–7	Kvik (Fredrikshald)
Fram (Larvik)	3–3 (a.e.t.)	Ørn
Frigg	4–1	Stavanger
Replay: 29 September 1916
Fram (Larvik)	1–4 (a.e.t.)	Ørn

- Lyn (Gjøvik) had a walkover.

== Semi-finals ==
Team 1	Score	Team 2
3 October 1916
Frigg	2–0	Kvik (Fredrikshald)
Lyn (Gjøvik)	2–5	Ørn

== Final ==
8 October 1916

Frigg	2–0	Ørn
Smedvik 70'; Andersen 71'	Report

Skøitebanen, Trondhjem
Attendance: 4,000
Referee: Peder Christian Andersen (Kristiania BK)

Frigg:
GK	Arne Wendelborg
DF	Yngvar Kopsland
DF	Georg Waitz
MF	Thorbjørn Damgaard
MF	Georg Hartmann-Hansen
MF	Fritz Semb-Thorstvedt
FW	Einar Hansen
FW	David Andersen
FW	Ragnvald Smedvik
FW	Bjarne Olsen
FW	Trygve Smith

Ørn:
GK	Thorbjørn Falkenberg
DF	R. Paulsen
DF	Th. Hansen
MF	Kristian Johnsen
MF	O. Lindberg
MF	Emil Johansen
FW	Michael Paulsen
FW	Harald Strøm
FW	O. Kristoffersen
FW	Erl. Pedersen
FW	V. Fredo Fredriksen

== See also ==
- 1916 in Norwegian football
