= EIE =

EIE may refer to:

- Daniel Eie (1889–1961), Norwegian sports official
- Enough Is Enough (US organization), an internet safety organization
- Enzymatic interesterification
- European Institute of Education, in Malta
- External independent evaluation
