= Knut Andersen =

Knut Andersen can refer to:

- Knut Andersen (film director) (1931–2019), Norwegian film director
- Knut Andersen (footballer, born 1908) (1908–1981), Norwegian footballer
- Knut Andersen (footballer, born 1927) (born 1927), Norwegian footballer
- Knut Andersen (footballer, born 1930) (1930–2002), Norwegian footballer
