= 1914 in Norwegian football =

Football in Norway
Men's football
- NM: Frigg

Results from football in Norway in the year 1914.

== Class A of local association leagues ==
Class A of local association leagues (kretsserier) is the predecessor of a national league competition. The champions qualify for the 1914 Norwegian Cup.

== Norwegian Cup ==
=== Final ===
11 October 1914

Frigg	4–2	Lyn (Gjøvik)
Trædal 36', 50'; Hansen 51'; Rasmussen 55'	Report	Grønnerud 10'; Grimsby 30'

Frogner stadion, Oslo
Attendance: 10,000
Referee: Daniel Eie (Lyn)

== National team ==
28 June Friendly	Norway	0–1	Sweden	Kristiania, Norway
17:00 (UTC+1); Match 12		Report	Hjelm 60'	Stadium: Frogner stadion Attendance: 8,000; Referee: Hagbard Vestergaard (Denmark)

12 July Friendly	Norway	1–1	Russia	Kristiania, Norway
18:00 (UTC+1); Match 13	R. Martmann 44'	Report	Krotov 5'	Stadium: Frogner stadion Attendance: 6,000; Referee: Daniel Eie (Norway)

25 October Friendly	Sweden	7–0	Norway	Solna, Sweden
13:00 (UTC+1); Match 14	Ekroth 5', 80', 86'; Söderberg 20', 65', 68'; Johansson 47'	Report		Stadium: Råsunda IP; Attendance: 5,000; Referee: Hagbard Vestergaard (Denmark)
