= Anders Svela =

Norwegian footballer and teacher

Anders Bernhard Svela (11 September 1939 – 7 September 2010) was a Norwegian footballer and teacher.

In his younger days he competed in both athletics (Sandnes IL), gymnastics and handball. He played at the highest tier in football, winning promotion with Stavanger, before moving to Oslo to study. Here he played 187 games for first-tier club Frigg. He was also capped twice for Norway. After retiring, he coached Ulf-Sandnes, Figgjo IL, Klepp IL, Ålgård FK and Egersunds IK between 1967 and 1982.

At the University of Oslo he graduated with the cand.philol. degree and spent his professional career as a teacher at Sandnes Upper Secondary School from 1967 to 2005. His favorite subject was French, and he was awarded the Ordre des Palmes Académiques.

He was married and had two daughters. He died in September 2010, shortly before his 71st birthday.
