= Steffen Martinsen =

Norwegian footballer (born 1988)

Personal information
- Date of birth: 16 August 1988 (age 38)
- Height: 1.88 m (6 ft 2 in)
- Position: Midfielder

Team information
- Current team: Svelvik

Youth career
- Skiold
- Lyn

Senior career*
Years	Team	Apps	(Gls)
2005	Lyn	0	(0)
2006–2007	Strømsgodset	1	(0)
2008–present	Svelvik		
- * Club domestic league appearances and goals

Steffen Martinsen (born 16 August 1988) is a Norwegian football midfielder who currently plays for Svelvik IF.

He began his career in SBK Skiold, and joined FC Lyn Oslo as a youth player. He also attended the school Norwegian College of Elite Sport. He played one game in the Norwegian football cup 2005, but none in the league. He then joined Strømsgodset IF in 2006, where he got one Norwegian Premier League game in 2007. Ahead of the 2008 season he joined Svelvik IF.
