= Trygve Smith =

Trygve Smith can refer to:

- Trygve Smith (footballer) (1892–1963), Norwegian footballer
- Trygve Smith (tennis) (1880–1948), Norwegian tennis player
- Trygve Smith, ski jumper and brother of Harald Smith
