= Ellef Mohn =

Norwegian footballer (1894-1974)

Ellef Mohn (13 August 1894 – 4 January 1974) was a Norwegian footballer who played for the clubs Lyn (Gjøvik) and SK Frigg and the Norwegian national team.

== Career ==
He was born in Gjøvik, and played for the local team Lyn which reached the final of the Norwegian Cup in 1914. Mohn later played for SK Frigg from Oslo, and reached the final of the Norwegian Cup in 1919 and 1920. After losing three finals, Mohn was on the winning team in 1921 when Frigg won 2–0 against Odd in the final.

Mohn played with the Norwegian national team at the Antwerp Olympics in 1920, where the Norwegian team reached the quarter finals. He was capped three times for Norway. He died in Oslo in 1974.
