= Einar Hansen =

Einar Hansen can refer to:

- Einar Hansen (Norwegian footballer)
- Einar Hanson
- Einar Tróndargjógv (Faroese footballer, earlier named Einar Hansen)
