= Steinar Johannessen =

Norwegian footballer and manager (1936–2019)

Personal information
- Full name: Håkon Steinar Engh Johannessen
- Date of birth: 1 January 1936
- Place of birth: Lillehammer, Norway
- Date of death: 30 July 2019 (aged 83)
- Position: Forward

Senior career*
Years	Team	Apps	(Gls)
1958–1966	Frigg		

International career
1957–1958	Norway u-21	2	(0)
1963–1964	Norway B	3	(1)
1959–1960	Norway	2	(0)

Managerial career
- Frigg
- 1969–1970: Lillestrøm
- 1971: Strømsgodset
- * Club domestic league appearances and goals

Håkon Steinar Engh Johannessen (1 January 1936 – 30 July 2019) was a Norwegian football striker and later manager.

He played for Frigg between 1958 and 1966, becoming cup runner-up in 1965. He represented Norway as an under-21, B and senior international.
