= Arnar Førsund =

Norwegian footballer (born 1986)

Arnar Jahrmann Førsund
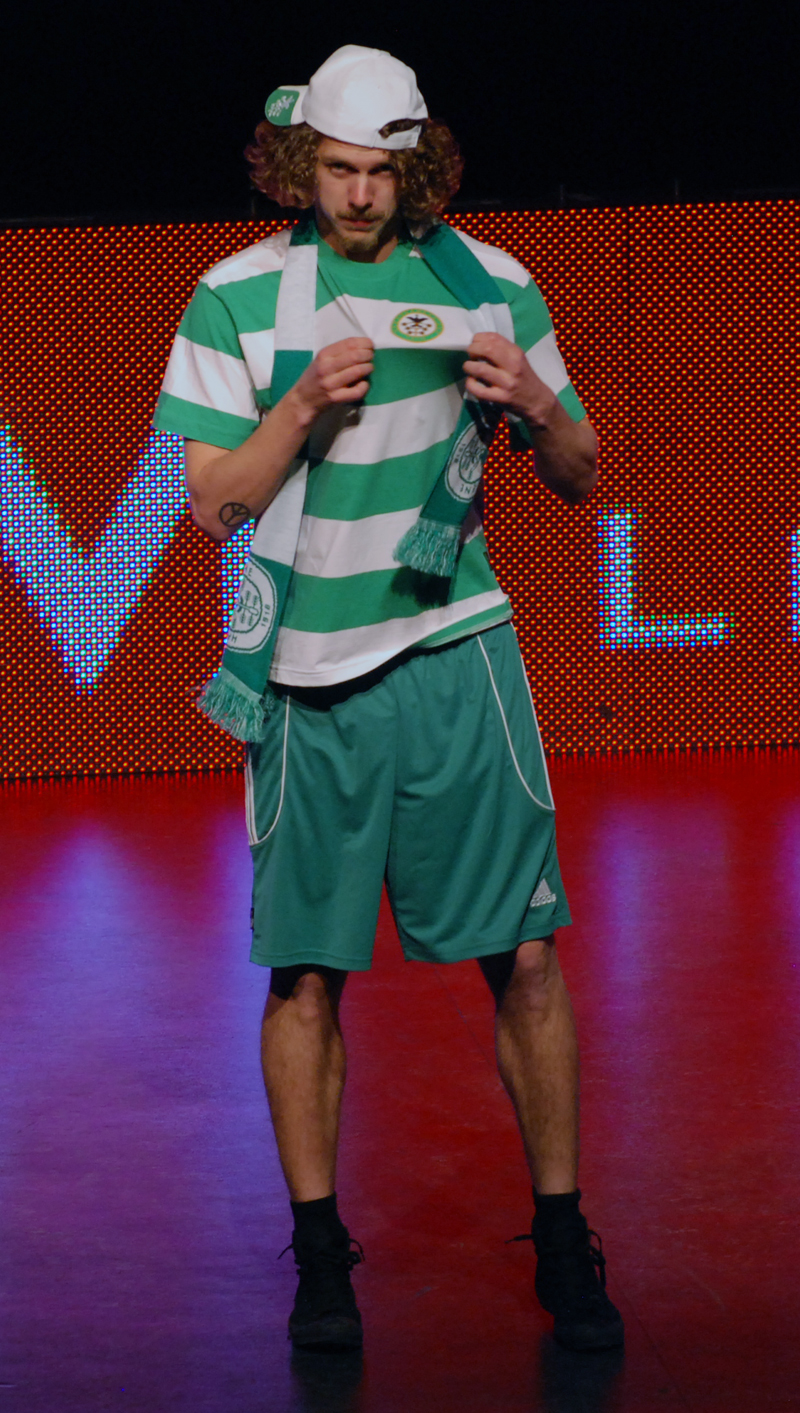

Personal information
- Full name: Arnar Jahrmann Førsund
- Date of birth: 29 July 1986 (age 40)
- Place of birth: Oslo, Norway
- Height: 1.90 m (6 ft 3 in)
- Position: Defender

Team information
- Current team: Ørn-Horten

Youth career
- Gjelleråsen
- Ørn-Horten

Senior career*
Years	Team	Apps	(Gls)
2004–2007	Vålerenga	4	(0)
2005–2006	→ Sandefjord (loan)	27	(1)
2007	→ Kongsvinger (loan)	13	(1)
2008–2009	HamKam	40	(1)
2010	Manglerud Star	24	(1)
2011–2012	Kongsvinger	55	(4)
2013–2014	Eidsvold Turn	26	(2)
2014–2016	Ørn-Horten	55	(6)
2017	Flint	2	(1)
2021–	Ørn-Horten	81	(4)

International career
2003	Norway U17	6	(0)
2004	Norway U18	12	(1)
2005	Norway U19	11	(2)
2006–2008	Norway U21	17	(3)
- * Club domestic league appearances and goals as of 1 January 2025

Arnar Jahrmann Førsund (born 29 July 1986) is a Norwegian footballer who plays for Ørn Horten. He played on top level for the Norwegian clubs Vålerenga, Sandefjord, Kongsvinger, HamKam and Manglerud Star.

== Club career ==
He made his Tippeligaen debut on 19 September 2004 for Vålerenga against Molde in a 4–0 win. He didn't feature anymore for the first team that season.

During the next season he only played a couple of cup matches before being loaned out to Sandefjord in the 1. divisjon during the second half of the season, helping them to a promotion to the top level. When he returned to Vålerenga he featured in two Royal League games.

In 2006, he spent the whole season on loan, again at Sandefjord, who had been promoted to the top-flight. In 2007, he went on his third loan spell, this time to 1. divisjon side Kongsvinger. He was recalled halfway through the season.

After the 2007 season he rejected a new contract and instead moved to Ham-Kam on a Bosman transfer. He spent two seasons there, first getting relegated from the top division, and then in 2009 another relegation from 1. divisjon. After the 2009 season he and several other players were sacked after rejecting a 70% wage-cut, with the club blaming it on poor economy.

In 2010, he joined 2. divisjon side Manglerud Star, before joining Kongsvinger in 2011.

Ahead of the 2013 season he went on to Eidsvold Turn, and moved home to Horten and Ørn-Horten in the summer of 2014. His final outing came in 2017 at IL Flint.

Four years after retiring, Førsund made a comeback for Ørn Horten in the 2021 Norwegian Football Cup, going on to play in the 2021 3. divisjon for the team.

== International career ==
Førsund has played at numerous youth levels. He made his debut for the Norwegian U21 team on 1 January 2006 against Turkey U21. In total he played 17 games for the U21 team, scoring 3 goals. In addition, he has played 29 games at younger levels.
