= Viggo Strømme =

Norwegian footballer

Personal information
- Date of birth: 12 August 1972 (age 54)
- Position: Defender

Senior career*
Years	Team	Apps	(Gls)
c.1985–1990	Donn		
1991–1994	Start	71	(2)
1995–1998	Vålerenga	39	(1)
1998	→ Lyn (loan)	7	(0)
1999	Vålerenga 2		
2000–2004	Frigg		

Managerial career
- 2001–2007: Frigg
- 2008–?: Lyn (youth)
- 2014: Lyn (assistant)
- * Club domestic league appearances and goals

Viggo Strømme (born 2 August 1967) is a retired Norwegian football defender and later manager.

He started his career in FK Donn in the mid-1980s and transferred to city rivals IK Start in 1991. From 1995 to 1998 he played for Vålerenga, spending loan time at Lyn in 1998.

In 1999 he was still under contract in Vålerenga, but demoted to the B team. Released in 2000, he joined Frigg as player-manager. After a stint from 2001 to 2007 he became youth coach in Lyn. He was later assistant manager of Lyn in 2014, but was mainly director of sports at the Norwegian School of Elite Sport and has written several football books.
