= 1914 Norwegian Football Cup =

Norgesmesterskapet i fotball for menn 1914

Tournament details
- Country: Norway
- Teams: 10

Final positions
- Champions: Frigg (1st title)
- Runners-up: Lyn (Gjøvik)

Tournament statistics
- Matches played: 9
- Goals scored: 60 (6.67 per match)

The 1914 Norwegian Football Cup was the 13th season of the Norwegian annual knockout football tournament. The tournament was open for 1914 local association leagues (kretsserier) champions. Frigg won their first title, having beaten Lyn (Gjøvik) in the final.

== First round ==
Team 1	Score	Team 2
5 September 1914
Grane (Arendal)	0–17	Drafn
Lyn (Gjøvik)	9–0	Lillestrøm

- The rest of the teams had a walkover.

== Second round ==
Team 1	Score	Team 2
12 September 1914
Drafn	3–1	Larvik Turn
27 September 1914
Freidig	0–7	Frigg
Kvik (Fredrikshald)	0–1	Lyn (Gjøvik)
Stavanger	8–1	Brann

== Semi-finals ==
Team 1	Score	Team 2
4 October 1914
Drafn	0–1	Lyn (Gjøvik)
Frigg	5–1	Stavanger

== Final ==
11 October 1914

Frigg	4–2	Lyn (Gjøvik)
Trædal 36', 50'; Hansen 51'; Rasmussen 55'	Report	Grønnerud 10'; Grimsby 30'

Frogner stadion, Oslo
Attendance: 10,000
Referee: Daniel Eie (Lyn)

Frigg:
GK	Arne Wendelborg
DF	Yngvar Kopsland
DF	Thorleif Limseth
MF	Thorbjørn Damgaard
MF	Sigurd Rasmussen
MF	Ragnvald Smevik
FW	Einar Hansen
FW	David Andersen
FW	Torkel Trædal
FW	Rolf Nestor
FW	Trygve Smith

Lyn (Gjøvik):
GK	Haug
DF	Jørgen Bredesen
DF	Hans Bjørn
MF	Martin Bredesen
MF	Einar Grønnerud
MF	Harald Mohn
FW	Martin Grimsby
FW	Ellef Mohn
FW	Ole Grimsby
FW	Hans Lingjerde
FW	Martin Olsen

== See also ==
- 1914 in Norwegian football
