= Harald Strøm =

Norwegian footballer and speed skater (1897-1977)

Personal information
- Born: 14 October 1897 Horten, Norway
- Died: 25 December 1977 (aged 80) Borre, Norway

Sport
- Country: Norway
- Sport: Speed skating
- Retired: 1928
Medal record
Men's speed skating
Representing Norway
World Championships
Gold medal – first place	1922 Kristiania	Allround
Silver medal – second place	1923 Stockholm	Allround
European Championships
Gold medal – first place	1923 Hamar	Allround

Harald Strøm (14 October 1897 – 25 December 1977) was a Norwegian speed skater, world champion, European champion and world record holder on 5000 metres. He was also a football player, national champion with his club, and playing for the national football team.

== Speed skating ==
Strøm set his first speed skating world record on 5000m in 1921 (8:27.7), being the first to break the magic 8:30. He improved his own record in 1922 (8:26.5). His record lasted for seven years, until Ivar Ballangrud overtook the record with 8:24.2 in 1929.

Strøm won a gold medal at the 1922 World Allround Speed Skating Championships for Men, winning both the 5000m and 10000m, and he received a silver medal in 1923. He received a gold medal at the 1923 European Allround Championships, where he also won the 5000m distance.

He was flag bearer for Norway at the 1924 Winter Olympics in Chamonix. He finished 5th on the three longest distances, and 4th allround. He represented Horten SK.

=== Records ===
==== World records ====
Over the course of his career, Strøm skated two world records:

Distance	Time	Date	Location
5000 m	8:27.7	20 February 1921	Kristiania
5000 m	8:26.5	18 February 1922	Kristiania

Source: SpeedSkatingStats.com

==== Personal records ====
Personal records
Men's Speed skating
Event	Result	Date	Location	Notes
500	45.2	18 February 1922	Kristiania	
1500	2:24.2	2 February 1923	Hamar	
5000	8:26.5	18 February 1922	Kristiania	
10000	17:32.8	19 February 1921	Kristiania	

Source: Sports-reference.com& SpeedSkatingNews.info

=== Medals ===
An overview of medals won by Strøm at important championships he participated in, listing the years in which he won each:

Championships	Gold medal	Silver medal	Bronze medal
World Allround	1922	1923	–
European Allround	1923	–	–
Norwegian Allround	–	–	–

Source: SpeedSkatingStats.com & Skoyteforbundet.no

== Football ==
Harald Strøm
Personal information
- Position: Forward

Senior career*
Years	Team	Apps	(Gls)
1913–1927	Ørn-Horten		

International career
1918–1927	Norway	16	(5)
- * Club domestic league appearances and goals

Strøm played for the football club Ørn Horten, and became two times Norwegian champion, in 1920 and in 1927. Strøm also played in the Cup final in 1916 and 1926, which Ørn lost. He played sixteen matches for the Norwegian national team between 1918 and 1927.

== Awards ==
Strøm was awarded Egebergs Ærespris in 1921.

Awards
Preceded by Helge Løvland	Egebergs Ærespris; 1921	Succeeded by Ole Reistad
