= 1971 Norwegian First Division =

27th season of top-tier football league in Norway

1. divisjon
- Season: 1971
- Dates: 25 April – 17 October
- Champions: Rosenborg; 3rd title
- Relegated: Frigg
- European Cup: Rosenborg
- Cup Winners' Cup: Fredrikstad
- UEFA Cup: Lyn; Viking
- Matches played: 90
- Goals scored: 252 (2.8 per match)
- Top goalscorer: Jan Fuglset (17 goals)
- Biggest home win: Lyn 7–1 Frigg (26 April 1971); Viking 6–0 Fredrikstad (17 June 1971); Sarpsborg FK 7–1 Frigg (11 August 1971); Fredrikstad 7–1 Frigg (17 October 1971)
- Biggest away win: Frigg 0–5 Hødd (10 October 1971)
- Highest scoring: Lyn 7–1 Frigg (26 April 1971); Sarpsborg FK 7–1 Frigg (11 August 1971); Fredrikstad 7–1 Frigg (17 October 1971)
- Longest winning run: Viking (5 games)
- Longest unbeaten run: Lyn (12 games)
- Longest winless run: Hødd (11 games)
- Longest losing run: Frigg; Hødd (4 games)
- Highest attendance: 15,200; Rosenborg 0–0 Strømsgodset (13 October 1971)
- Lowest attendance: 1,000; Hødd 4–1 HamKam (6 October 1971)
- Average attendance: 6,578 ▲16.7%

The 1971 1. divisjon was the 27th completed season of top division football in Norway.

== Overview ==
It was contested by 10 teams, and Rosenborg BK won the championship, their third league title.

Only one team was relegated this season due to the league's extension to 12 teams ahead of the 1972 season.

== Teams and locations ==
Note: Table lists in alphabetical order.

Team	Ap.	Location
Brann	19	Bergen
Fredrikstad	26	Fredrikstad
Frigg	14	Oslo
HamKam	3	Hamar
Hødd	4	Ulsteinvik
Lyn	18	Oslo
Rosenborg	9	Trondheim
Sarpsborg FK	21	Sarpsborg
Strømsgodset	6	Drammen
Viking	24	Stavanger

== League table ==
Pos	Team	Pld	W	D	L	GF	GA	GD	Pts	Qualification or relegation
1	Rosenborg (C)	18	9	6	3	25	11	+14	24	Qualification for the European Cup first round
2	Lyn	18	9	5	4	28	17	+11	23	Qualification for the UEFA Cup first round
3	Viking	18	9	4	5	41	20	+21	22	Qualification for the UEFA Cup first round
4	Fredrikstad	18	8	6	4	32	23	+9	22	Qualification for the Cup Winners' Cup first round
5	Strømsgodset	18	7	7	4	28	21	+7	21	
6	HamKam	18	7	7	4	19	15	+4	21	
7	Sarpsborg FK	18	6	4	8	32	27	+5	16	
8	Hødd	18	3	5	10	17	32	−15	11	
9	Brann	18	3	5	10	16	31	−15	11	
10	Frigg (R)	18	4	1	13	16	55	−39	9	Relegation to Second Division

Source: NIFS
Rules for classification: 1) points; 2) goal difference; 3) number of goals scored.
(C) Champions; (R) Relegated

== Results ==
Home \ Away	BRA	FRE	FRI	HAM	HØD	LYN	ROS	SRP	STM	VIK
Brann	—	1–1	3–1	0–3	2–2	0–1	0–1	1–3	0–0	1–0
Fredrikstad	2–0	—	7–1	4–0	0–0	3–2	2–1	2–0	3–3	2–2
Frigg	1–0	3–4	—	1–0	0–5	1–3	1–1	0–4	0–3	1–0
HamKam	2–0	0–0	1–0	—	0–0	1–1	1–1	0–0	4–1	3–1
Hødd	0–0	0–0	0–2	4–1	—	1–0	0–3	1–2	0–1	1–3
Lyn	3–1	1–0	7–1	0–0	1–0	—	2–2	2–1	0–1	2–1
Rosenborg	0–1	1–0	2–1	0–0	4–1	0–0	—	3–0	0–0	1–0
Sarpsborg	3–3	1–0	7–1	0–1	4–0	1–2	1–2	—	1–1	1–4
Strømsgodset	3–1	1–2	4–0	1–2	4–1	0–0	0–3	2–1	—	1–1
Viking	5–0	6–0	4–1	1–0	5–1	3–1	1–0	2–2	2–2	—

Source: nifs.no (in Norwegian)
Legend: Blue = home team win; Yellow = draw; Red = away team win.

== Season statistics ==
=== Top scorer ===
- (Norway) Jan Fuglset, Fredrikstad – 17 goals

=== Attendances ===
Pos	Team	Total	High	Low	Average	Change
1	Viking	92,641	15,300	6,000	10,293	+79.5%
2	Strømsgodset	78,216	13,200	4,500	8,691	−13.9%
3	Rosenborg	75,972	15,828	4,300	8,441	+7.1%
4	Lyn	71,681	15,088	4,553	7,965	n/a^{2}
5	Brann	69,400	8,800	6,000	7,711	−2.7%
6	Fredrikstad	55,233	10,018	2,592	6,137	+31.3%
7	Frigg	41,653	7,572	2,761	4,628	n/a^{2}
8	HamKam	40,634	7,000	3,107	4,515	−10.9%
9	Sarpsborg FK	37,001	9,248	1,808	4,111	+18.7%
10	Hødd	29,600	7,000	1,000	3,289	+50.3%
	League total	592,031	15,828	1,000	6,578	+16.7%

Source: nifs.no
Notes:
2: Team played last season in 2. divisjon.
