= Jan Anders Hovdan =

Norwegian footballer (born 1950)

Personal information
- Date of birth: 4 June 1950 (age 76)
- Position: Midfielder

Senior career*
Years	Team	Apps	(Gls)
1968–1970	Lyn	11	(2)
1971–1974	Frigg		

International career
1961	Norway U19	2	(0)
1973	Norway	6	(0)
- * Club domestic league appearances and goals

Jan Anders Hovdan (born 4 June 1950) is a retired Norwegian football midfielder. He started his career in Lyn, but did not break through and went on to Frigg. He also represented Norway as an U19 and senior international.
