= Daniel Skretteberg =

Ethiopian footballer (born 2000)

Personal information
- Full name: Daniel Negussie Skretteberg
- Date of birth: 24 November 2001 (age 24)
- Place of birth: Norway
- Height: 1.87 m (6 ft 2 in)
- Position: Goalkeeper

Team information
- Current team: Ørn Horten
- Number: 12

Senior career*
Years	Team	Apps	(Gls)
2019–2022	Strømsgodset	0	(0)
2022	MuSa	12	(0)
2022	MP	0	(0)
2023	Bærum	25	(0)
2024	Ørn Horten	28	(0)
2025–	Åssiden	1	(0)
- * Club domestic league appearances and goals as of 26 March 2025 ‡ National team caps and goals as of 26 March 2025

Daniel Negussie Skretteberg (born 24 November 2001) is a footballer who plays as a goalkeeper for Åssiden IF. Born in Norway, he has been called up to represent Ethiopia internationally.

== Early life ==
Skretteberg was born on 24 November 2001 in Norway. As a youth player, he joined the youth academy of Norwegian side Strømsgodset. He signed his first professional contract with the club at the age of seventeen. He is a native of Steinberg, Norway.

== Club career ==
Skretteberg started his career with Norwegian side Strømsgodset. In 2022, he signed for Finnish side MuSa. After that, he signed for Finnish side MP. In 2023, he signed for Norwegian side Bærum. In 2024, he signed for Norwegian side Ørn Horten.

== International career ==
Skretteberg is eligible to represent Norway and Ethiopia internationally through his mother. He previously called up to represent Norway internationally at youth level at the age of fifteen. On 2023 He has been called up to represent Ethiopia senior national team for an internationally friendly match against Guyana.

== Style of play ==
Skretteberg operates as a goalkeeper. He has been described as a "modern modern-day goalkeeper who, in addition to his blocking skills, controls the game well and plays confidently with his feet".

== Personal life ==
Skretteberg was born to an Ethiopian mother and a Norwegian father. He was described as gained notoriety for having the worst overall rating of all goalkeepers in the 2021 version of the Fifa soccer game".
