= Ingolf Pedersen =

Norwegian footballer (1890–1964)

Personal information
- Nickname: Skruen
- Nationality: Norwegian
- Born: 7 December 1890 Skien, Norway
- Died: 2 January 1964 (aged 73)

Sport
- Sport: Football
- Club: Odd

Ingolf "Skruen" Pedersen (7 December 1890 – 2 January 1964) was a Norwegian football goalkeeper.

== Biography ==
Pedersen was born in Skien. He played for the club Odd, and also for the Norwegian national team. He competed at the 1912 Summer Olympics in Stockholm. He was Norwegian champion with Odd in 1913, 1915, 1919, 1922 and 1924.
