= Svein Weltz =

Norwegian footballer (born 1936)

Personal information
- Date of birth: 28 July 1936 (age 90)

International career
Years	Team	Apps	(Gls)
1954–1959	Norway	2	(0)

Svein Weltz (born 28 July 1936) is a Norwegian footballer. He played in two matches for the Norway national football team from 1959 to 1960.
