= Daniel Eie =

Norwegian sports official

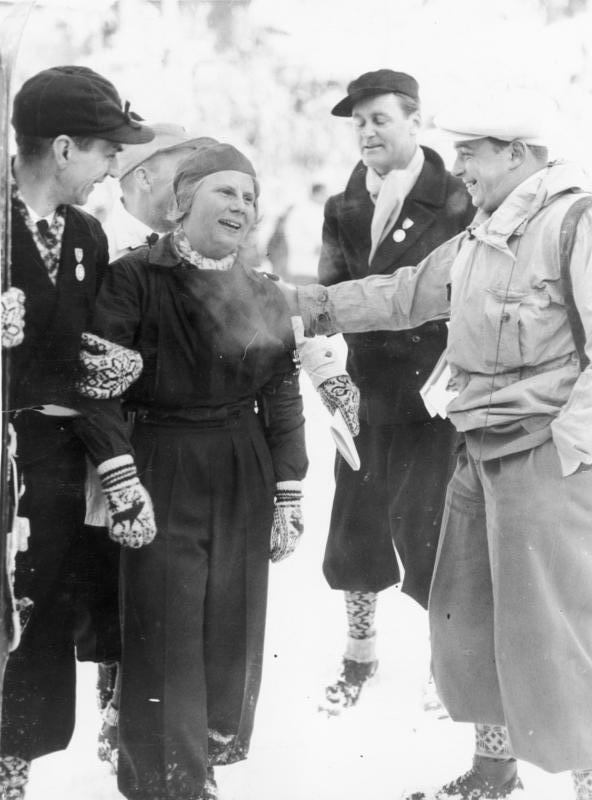
Daniel Eie to the left, together with 16 years old Laila Schou Nilsen, immediately after her surprise victory in downhill at the 1936 Winter Olympics, the very first Olympic alpine contest.

Daniel Eie (24 April 1889 – 28 May 1961) was a Norwegian sports official.

He was a member of the boys' clubs Spring and Løp as a child, but joined SFK Lyn in 1906. He served as vice president of the Football Association of Norway at the age of 21, in 1911. He was then the president from 1916 to 1918, and later returned to the post in 1927 and 1928. By then he was also Norway's representative in FIFA. He also refereed the 1914 Norwegian Football Cup final. From 1915 to 1918 he was a board member of Norges Riksforbund for Idræt, then vice president until 1919. He was later president of Norges Landsforbund for Idræt from 1932 to 1936. He died in May 1961 and was buried in Vestre gravlund.

Sporting positions
| Preceded by Carl Frølich Hanssen | President of the Football Association of Norway; 1915–1918 | Succeeded by Carl Christiansen |
| Preceded by Sam Knutzen | President of the Football Association of Norway; 1927–1928 | Succeeded by Jacob Ramm |
| Preceded by Jørgen Martinius Jensen | President of the Norges Landsforbund for Idræt; 1932–1936 | Succeeded by Carl Christiansen |
