= Kaare Lie =

Norwegian footballer (1905-1968)

Personal information
- Date of birth: 25 July 1905
- Date of death: 14 June 1968 (aged 62)

International career
Years	Team	Apps	(Gls)
1928–1929	Norway	2	(0)

Kaare Lie (25 July 1905 – 14 June 1968) was a Norwegian footballer. He played in two matches for the Norway national football team from 1928 to 1929.
