= Torkel Trædal =

Norwegian footballer (1892-1979)

Personal information
- Date of birth: 9 May 1892
- Date of death: 14 February 1979 (aged 86)

International career
Years	Team	Apps	(Gls)
1914	Norway	2	(0)

Torkel Trædal (9 May 1892 – 14 February 1979) was a Norwegian footballer. He played in two matches for the Norway national football team in 1914.
