= Yngvar Tørnros =

Norwegian footballer (1894-1967)

Personal information
- Date of birth: 28 June 1894
- Date of death: 27 February 1967 (aged 72)

International career
Years	Team	Apps	(Gls)
1916	Norway	5	(0)

Yngvar Tørnros (28 June 1894 – 27 February 1967) was a Norwegian footballer. He played in five matches for the Norway national football team in 1916.
