= Sigurd Rasmussen =

Norwegian footballer (1892-1974)

Personal information
- Date of birth: 1 February 1892
- Date of death: 27 September 1974 (aged 82)

International career
Years	Team	Apps	(Gls)
1912–1917	Norway	4	(0)

Sigurd Rasmussen (1 February 1892 – 27 September 1974) was a Norwegian footballer. He played in four matches for the Norway national football team from 1912 to 1917.
