= Bjarne Olsen =

Norwegian footballer (1898-1976)

Personal information
- Date of birth: 24 July 1898
- Date of death: 19 June 1976 (aged 77)

International career
Years	Team	Apps	(Gls)
1925	Norway	1	(0)

Bjarne Olsen (24 July 1898 – 19 June 1976) was a Norwegian footballer. He played in one match for the Norway national football team in 1925.
