= European Institute of Education =

eie European Business School, Malta
- Established: 2000
- President: Dr. Antonello Cappitta
- Location: Cavalieri A.H., Spinola Road, STJ 3019,, St. Julians, Malta; 35°53′47″N 14°30′41″E
- Campus: Malta, UK, Czech Republic, Georgia, Malaysia, Singapore, India and Cyprus
- Website: http://eie.business/

The eie European Business School (eie) (formerly known as European Institute of Education) is a government licensed higher education institution based in St. Julians, Malta.

The business school was established in 2000. Student recruitment offices operate in various European and Asian cities. It provides Malta Government Scholarship Scheme to its Students.

eie conducts various courses in business and management at academic level and also executive courses (executive education).

A collaboration agreement has been signed between the European Institute of Education and the Young Entrepreneurs and Leaders Organisation (YEL).
