= David Andersen (footballer) =

Norwegian footballer (1894–1964)

Personal information
- Date of birth: 19 June 1894
- Place of birth: Oslo, Norway
- Date of death: 24 July 1964 (aged 70)
- Position: Forward

International career
Years	Team	Apps	(Gls)
1912–1917	Norway	9	(0)

David Andersen (19 June 1894 – 24 July 1964) was a Norwegian footballer. He played in nine matches for the Norway national football team from 1912 to 1917.
