= Knut Andersen (footballer, born 1927) =

Norwegian footballer

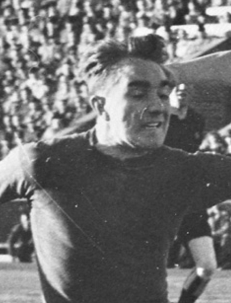

Personal information
- Date of birth: 20 July 1927 (age 99)
- Place of birth: Oslo, Norway
- Position: Midfielder

International career
Years	Team	Apps	(Gls)
1949–1961	Norway	3	(0)

Knut Andersen (born 20 July 1927) is a Norwegian former footballer. He played in three matches for the Norway national football team from 1949 to 1961.

At club level, Andersen played for Frigg and Skeid, winning the Norwegian Cup twice with Skeid (1947 and 1958). He also played professionally for Padova in Italy from 1951 to 1953.
