= Carl Christiansen =

Sports official from Norway

Carl Emil Christiansen
- Born: 21 April 1886; Tønsberg, Norway
- Died: 23 July 1970 (aged 84)
- Occupations: Post office official Sports official Organizational leader

Carl Emil Christiansen (21 April 1886 – 23 July 1970) was a Norwegian post office official, sports official and organizational leader.

Christiansen was born in Tønsberg to merchant Carl Emil Christiansen and Harda Paulsen, and married Edna Louise Braastad in 1939.

He served as president of the Football Association of Norway from 1918 to 1920, and chaired the Norges Landsforbund for Idræt from 1936 to 1940. He chaired the trade union Det norske Postmannslag from 1923 to 1925. He was decorated Knight of the Swedish Order of Vasa.
