= Fritz Semb-Thorstvedt =

Norwegian footballer (1892-1975)

Personal information
- Date of birth: 18 May 1892
- Date of death: 21 November 1975 (aged 83)

International career
Years	Team	Apps	(Gls)
1918–1919	Norway	3	(0)

Fritz Semb-Thorstvedt (18 May 1892 – 21 November 1975) was a Norwegian footballer. He played in three matches for the Norway national football team from 1918 to 1919.
