= Tor Wæhler =

Norwegian footballer (born 1947)

Personal information
- Date of birth: 25 January 1947 (age 79)

International career
| Years | Team | Apps | (Gls) |
| 1971 | Norway | 1 | (0) |

Tor Wæhler (born 25 January 1947) is a Norwegian footballer. He played in one match for the Norway national football team in 1971.
