= Ray Freeman (footballer) =

English footballer (1944–2019)

Raymond Freeman (1944 – 27 January 2019) was an English football player and manager.

== Early life ==
Freeman was born in Sawston, England.

== Playing career ==
As a player, Freeman played in the United States and for English clubs including Cambridge United.

== Style of play ==
Freeman mainly operated as a wing-half and was known for his creativity and combativeness.

== Managerial career ==
At the age of twenty-seven, Freeman was appointed manager of Norwegian side Brann.

== Personal life ==
After helping Brann win the 1972 Norwegian Football Cup as manager, Freeman became the first person in history to be honored as an honorary citizen in Bergen, Norway.

== Death ==
Freeman died on 27 January 2019.
