= Rolf Semb-Thorstvedt =

Norwegian footballer (1898-1972)

Personal information
- Date of birth: 3 April 1898
- Place of birth: Kristiania
- Date of death: 15 October 1972 (aged 74)
- Place of death: Oslo

Senior career*
Years	Team	Apps	(Gls)
- Frigg Oslo FK

International career
	Norway	2	
- * Club domestic league appearances and goals

Rolf Semb-Thorstvedt (3 April 1898 – 15 October 1972) was a Norwegian football player for the club SK Frigg. He was born in Kristiania. He played with the Norwegian national team at the Antwerp Olympics in 1920, where the Norwegian team reached the quarter finals. He was capped two times for Norway.

Semb-Thorstvedt won the Norwegian Cup with Frigg in 1921, and he scored one goal in the final against Odd. He also played on the Frigg-team that lost the Norwegian Cup finals in 1919 and 1920. He died in Oslo in 1972.
