= Hans Dahl (footballer) =

Norwegian footballer (1900-1977)

Personal information
- Date of birth: 8 April 1900
- Place of birth: Oslo, Norway
- Date of death: 16 June 1977 (aged 77)
- Position: Forward

International career
Years	Team	Apps	(Gls)
1924–1925	Norway	5	(0)

Hans Dahl (8 April 1900 – 16 June 1977) was a Norwegian footballer. He played in five matches for the Norway national football team from 1924 to 1925.
