= Alf Lagesen =

Norwegian footballer (1897-1973)

Personal information
- Full name: Alf Martinius Lagesen
- Date of birth: 24 June 1897
- Date of death: 13 February 1973 (aged 75)
- Position: Goalkeeper

Senior career*
Years	Team	Apps	(Gls)
- Drammens BK

International career
1920	Norway	1	(0)
- * Club domestic league appearances and goals

Alf Martinius Lagesen (24 June 1897 – 13 February 1973) was a Norwegian footballer who played as a goalkeeper for Drammens BK and the Norwegian national team.

Lagesen played one international match, a friendly in 1920 against Sweden in Stockholm. He was in the Norwegian squad at the Antwerp Olympics the same year where he was reserve goalkeeper behind Sigurd Wathne, but he did not play in any matches.

Lagesen was also a referee and officiated the 1921 Norwegian Football Cup final. He was later chairman of Drammens BK.
