= Trygve Smith (footballer) =

Norwegian footballer (1892-1963)

Personal information
- Date of birth: 15 April 1892
- Date of death: 1 April 1963 (aged 70)

International career
Years	Team	Apps	(Gls)
1917	Norway	1	(0)

Trygve Smith (15 April 1892 – 1 April 1963) was a Norwegian footballer. He played in one match for the Norway national football team in 1917.
