= Knut Andersen (footballer, born 1908) =

Norwegian footballer (1908-1981)

Personal information
- Full name: Knut Egil Einar Andersen
- Date of birth: 16 January 1908
- Place of birth: Oslo, Norway
- Date of death: 22 September 1981 (aged 73)
- Position: Midfielder

International career
Years	Team	Apps	(Gls)
1930	Norway	1	(0)

Knut Andersen (16 January 1908 – 22 September 1981) was a Norwegian footballer. He played in one match for the Norway national football team in 1930.
