= Einar Hansen (Norwegian footballer) =

Norwegian footballer (1892-1951)

Personal information
- Date of birth: 11 July 1892
- Date of death: 30 August 1951 (aged 59)

International career
Years	Team	Apps	(Gls)
1912–1916	Norway	6	(0)

Einar Hansen (11 July 1892 – 30 August 1951) was a Norwegian footballer. He played in six matches for the Norway national football team from 1912 to 1916.
