= Michael Paulsen =

Norwegian football player (1899–1968)

Personal information
- Date of birth: 1 March 1899
- Date of death: 18 October 1968 (aged 69)

Senior career*
Years	Team	Apps	(Gls)
- Ørn-Horten

International career
	Norway	20	(1)
- * Club domestic league appearances and goals

Michael Paulsen (1 March 1899 – 18 October 1968) was a Norwegian football player. He was born in Kristiania, and played as a winger for Ørn-Horten. He was capped 20 times for Norwegian national team scoring one goal, and played at the Antwerp Olympics in 1920, where the Norwegian team reached the quarter-finals. He died in Horten in 1968.
