= IL Braatt =

Norwegian sports club

- Full name: Idrettslaget Braatt
- Founded: 31 March 1916; 110 years ago
- Stadium: Braatthallen (floorball, wrestling); Idrettsplassen (association football)
- Website: http://www.braatt.com/

Idrettslaget Braatt is a Norwegian multi-sports club located in Kristiansund Municipality, Norway. Founded in 1916, the club was started as a wrestling club by outbreakers from Ynglingeforeningens IL (YMCA). The club currently have departments in figure skating, floorball, football, ice hockey, speed skating and wrestling.

== History ==
On 31 March 1916, Braatt IL was founded. Olaf Gaupseth was elected as the club's first chairman. The club had athletics, boxing, football and wrestling on their program in the beginning years.

== Football ==
IL Braatt Fotball
- Full name: Idrettslaget Braatt
- Founded: 31 March 1916; 110 years ago
- Stadium: Idrettsplassen, Kristiansund Municipality
Home colours	Away colours

Braatt's men's team were playing in the top division in 1937–38, 1938–39 and 1939–40, a period were the first tier in the Norwegian football league system were organised in regional departments. Braatt reached the second round of the Norwegian Cup for their first time in 1919 and the third round in 1936, 1950 and 1960.

== Wrestling ==
Arne Gaupseth became the club's first Norwegian champion through winning the middle-weight Norwegian championships in Wrestling at Hamar in 1924. He also participated in the 1924 Summer Olympics in Paris. Later have Robert Gaupseth and Felix Baldauf participated in the Olympics.

== Eksterne lenker ==
- Official website
