= SBK Skiold =

Norwegian sports club

Home colours

Ski- og Ballklubben Skiold ("Shield") is a Norwegian sports club based in Strømsø, Drammen. The club is at present mostly active in association football, but has earlier had success in bandy and has also had a department for ice hockey. The club was founded on 7 June 1910 and was originally called Bragerøen Idrettsforening. The club colour is red.

Skiold became national champion in bandy in 1939 and 1957. In 1997, the elite bandy team of Skiold was merged with other bandy teams from Drammen and formed Drammen Bandy, but the club is still working with youth teams.

The men's football team last played in the Third Division, the fourth tier of Norwegian football, in 1996.
