= Sarpsborg FK =

Norwegian football club

- Full name: Sarpsborg Fotballklubb
- Founded: 8 August 1903; 122 years ago
- Ground: Kurland kunstgress Sarpsborg
- League: 4. divisjon
- 2023: 4. divisjon (Amedialigaen), 6th of 14
Home colours	Away colours

Sarpsborg Fotballklubb is a Norwegian football club from Sarpsborg, Østfold. It was founded on 8 May 1903. Sarpsborg is one of the most successful teams in the Norwegian Football Cup, with six titles and twelve finals in total. In 2007, the club merged into the club that is now called Sarpsborg 08, and today Sarpsborg FK is an amateur club playing in the 4. divisjon, the fifth tier of Norwegian league system.

== History ==
Sarpsborg played their first cup final as early as 1906, which they lost against Odd. In 1917, in Sarpsborg's third final, the club won its first title after Brann was beaten 4–1. Sarpsborg also won the cup in 1929, 1939, 1948, 1949 and 1951. Harry Yven participated in four of these six championships, the first time as a 17-year-old in 1929 and the last as a 37-year-old in 1949.

Sarpsborg's latest period of greatness was the years around 1970. That year, they participated in the European Cup. With the exception of 1957 to 1962 and 1973, Sarpsborg played at the top tier from the inaugural season in 1937–38 till the club was relegated in 1974. Former Scottish international forward Jim McCalliog played for Sarpsborg FK in 1979. Sarpsborg last played in the Norwegian First Division in 1997.

Other famous former players include Kristian Henriksen, Asbjørn Halvorsen, Asbjørn Hansen, Kolbjørn Nilsen, Harry Kure and Egil Olsen.

=== 21st century ===
The club played in the 2. divisjon (third tier) as late as in 2007. After that season, the first team was merged with local rivals Sparta Sarpsborg to form a new team Sarpsborg Sparta FK. Sarpsborg Sparta FK took the place of Sparta Sarpsborg in the league system, namely in the 1. divisjon. Sarpsborg FK did not cease to exist, but fielded a new first team for the 2008 season, which took over the place of its own second team had occupied in the league system, in the Fourth Division. Because of the historic rivalry between SFK and Sparta, Sarpsborg Sparta changed its name to Sarpsborg 08 ahead of the 2009 season.

== Achievements ==
- Norwegian top flight:
  - Third place (1): 1964
- Norwegian Cup:
  - Winners (6): 1917, 1929, 1939, 1948, 1949, 1951
  - Runners-up (6): 1906, 1907, 1925, 1934, 1935, 1964

== European record ==
Season	Competition	Round	Country	Club	Home	Away	Aggregate
1970–71	Inter-Cities Fairs Cup	First round	(England)	Leeds United	0–1	0–5	0–6
