= FK Ørn Horten =

Norwegian football club

Ørn Horten
- Full name: Fotballklubben Ørn Horten
- Nicknames: Ørn, Ørnane
- Founded: 4 May 1904; 122 years ago
- Ground: Lystlunden; Horten Municipality
- Capacity: 1,000
- Chairman: Kjetil Ramberg
- League: 3. divisjon
- 2024: 2. divisjon group 1, 13th of 14 (relegated)
Home colours	Away colours

Fotballklubben Ørn Horten, formerly Ørn fotballklubb, abbreviated Ørn FK, popularly known as De brune or Ørnane, was founded on 4 May 1904, and is Horten Municipality's largest football club. The club won the Norwegian Cup four times in the 1920s and '30s and played in the top division during the 1950s and '60s. Since 2022, Ørn plays in the Norwegian Second Division, the third tier of the Norwegian football league system.

Ørn has developed several talents, recent examples include Adnan Hadzic to Start, Benjamin Zalo to Swedish football and Julian Kristoffersen to Danish football.

Previously, the club also had an active bandy department.

== Honours ==
- Norwegian Football Cup:
  - Winners (4): 1920, 1927, 1928, 1930
  - Runners-up (4): 1916, 1926, 1929, 1932

== Players ==
=== Current squad ===
As of 1 February 2025

Note: Flags indicate national team as defined under FIFA eligibility rules; some limited exceptions apply. Players may hold more than one non-FIFA nationality.

No.	Pos.	Nation	Player
1	GK	NOR	Adam Anmarkrud
2	DF	NOR	Seihou Leroy Sillah Nilsen
4	DF	NOR	Arnar Førsund
5	DF	NOR	Sebastian Pop
6	DF	NOR	Fredrik Døhlen Tørnby
7	DF	NOR	Christopher Lindquist
8	DF	NOR	Thomas Søderstrøm Knutsen
9	MF	NOR	Jakob Johannes Auby
10	MF	KOS	Alban Kadriu
11	FW	NOR	Gustav Helling
12	GK	NOR	Daniel Skretteberg

No.	Pos.	Nation	Player
13	DF	NOR	Vetle Skullestad
14	MF	NOR	Alex Krawiec
17	MF	NOR	Christian Hargott
18	DF	NOR	Nikolai Nilsen
19	MF	NOR	Daniel Hamde
23	MF	NOR	Steffen Wivestad
24	FW	NOR	Philip Schie
25	MF	NOR	Frank Bamenye
26	DF	NOR	Lenny Sørensen
27	DF	NOR	Erik Skulstad-Hansen
28	FW	NOR	Sander Werni

=== Notable former players ===
- (Norway) Bjørn Odmar Andersen
- (Norway) Trym Bergman
- (Norway) Harry Boye Karlsen
- (Norway) Per Bredesen
- (Norway) Arnar Førsund
- (Norway) Ardian Gashi
- (Norway) Jørgen Jalland
- (Norway) Dag Riisnæs
- (Norway) Harald Strøm
- (Norway) Glenn Andersen

== Recent seasons ==
Season	League									Cup	Notes
Season	Division	Pos.	Pl.	W	D	L	GS	GA	P	Cup	Notes
2011	2. divisjon	4	26	15	3	8	50	38	48	Second round	
2012	2. divisjon	↓ 12	26	8	4	14	42	50	28	First round	Relegated
2013	3. divisjon	↑ 1	26	20	3	3	88	30	63	First round	Promoted
2014	2. divisjon	10	26	10	1	15	50	57	31	Second round	
2015	2. divisjon	11	26	6	6	14	29	48	24	Second round	
2016	2. divisjon	↓ 13	26	3	2	21	28	78	11	First round	Relegated
2017	3. divisjon	2	26	16	4	6	60	29	52	Third round	
2018	3. divisjon	2	26	15	7	4	66	24	52	Second round	
2019	3. divisjon	5	26	14	8	4	57	29	50	First round	
2020	Season cancelled										
2021	3. divisjon	↑ 1	13	9	2	2	32	12	29	First round	Promoted
2022	2. divisjon	8	24	7	8	9	37	38	29	First round	
