= Stavanger IF Fotball =

Norwegian football club

Stavanger IF
- Full name: Stavanger Idrettsforening
- Nickname: SIF
- Founded: 17 September 1905
- Ground: SIF Stadion (nicknamed Siffen)
- Capacity: 1,100
- Chairman: Kjell Egil Fjeldså
- League: 4. divisjon
- 2019: 5. divisjon, 1st of 12 (promoted)
| Home colours | Away colours |

Stavanger IF Fotball, the football division of Stavanger Idrettsforening, is a football club from Stavanger, Norway. In Rogaland, they are colloquially called Sif or Stavanger.

SIF reached the semi-finals of the Norwegian Football Cup in 1912, 1914, 1929 and 1930. Its latest stint in the First Division, the second tier of the Norwegian football league system, was in 2009. The club is currently playing in 5. divisjon, the sixth tier of Norwegian football.

== History ==
The club was founded 17 September 1905. They were the dominating club in Stavanger up until the 1930s, and reached the semi-finals of the Norwegian Football Cup in 1912, 1914, 1929 and 1930. One of the club's profiles from that period, Sverre Berg-Johannesen, was the first player from Rogaland to be capped for the Norway national football team.

After World War Two, Viking FK took over as the dominating football club in Stavanger. SIF went on to play in lower divisions, and the club was also passed by FK Vidar (another club from Stavanger) in terms of league position and achievements in the 1980s.

Per Ravn Omdal, president of the Norwegian Football Association from 1987 to 1992 and the current vice president of UEFA, started his active career with SIF.

With Roger Nilsen as manager, SIF was promoted to 2. divisjon in 2006. On 25 October 2008, SIF secured promotion to 1. divisjon for the 2009 season after winning their group in 2. divisjon, but were relegated back to 2. divisjon for the 2010 season. They were promptly relegated again, to 3. divisjon in 2010.

== Recent seasons ==
| Season | League | | | | | | | | | Cup | Notes |
| Season | Division | Pos | Pld | W | D | L | GF | GA | Pts | Cup | Notes |
|---|---|---|---|---|---|---|---|---|---|---|---|
| 2001 | 4. divisjon | 8th | 20 | 7 | 1 | 12 | 26 | 50 | 22 | | |
| 2002 | 4. divisjon | ↓ 10th | 22 | 5 | 2 | 15 | 34 | 57 | 17 | | Relegated |
| 2003 | 5. divisjon | ↑ 1st | 16 | 12 | 2 | 2 | 65 | 23 | 38 | | Promoted |
| 2004 | 4. divisjon | ↑ 1st | 22 | 18 | 4 | 0 | 105 | 23 | 58 | | Promoted |
| 2005 | 3. divisjon | 2nd | 22 | 15 | 5 | 2 | 69 | 23 | 50 | | |
| 2006 | 3. divisjon | ↑ 1st | 22 | 18 | 2 | 2 | 71 | 14 | 56 | First round | Promoted |
| 2007 | 2. divisjon | 2nd | 26 | 17 | 1 | 8 | 62 | 27 | 52 | First round | |
| 2008 | 2. divisjon | ↑ 1st | 26 | 20 | 3 | 3 | 63 | 23 | 61 | Second round | Promoted |
| 2009 | 1. divisjon | ↓ 15th | 30 | 6 | 11 | 13 | 35 | 55 | 29 | Third round | Relegated |
| 2010 | 2. divisjon | ↓ 14th | 26 | 3 | 6 | 17 | 29 | 70 | 14 | Second round | Relegated |
| 2011 | 3. divisjon | 6th | 26 | 11 | 8 | 7 | 49 | 42 | 35 | Second qualifying round | |
| 2012 | 3. divisjon | ↓ 12th | 26 | 7 | 3 | 16 | 38 | 82 | 24 | First round | Relegated |
| 2013 | 4. divisjon | 6th | 22 | 9 | 2 | 11 | 61 | 51 | 29 | First round | |
| 2014 | 4. divisjon | ↓ 11th | 22 | 4 | 2 | 16 | 37 | 95 | 14 | | Relegated |
| 2015 | 5. divisjon | 9th | 22 | 7 | 3 | 12 | 46 | 79 | 24 | | |
| 2016 | 5. divisjon | 5th | 20 | 10 | 2 | 8 | 47 | 44 | 32 | | |
| 2017 | 5. divisjon | 8th | 20 | 8 | 1 | 11 | 45 | 52 | 25 | | |
| 2018 | 5. divisjon | 9th | 18 | 5 | 4 | 9 | 39 | 53 | 19 | | Avoided relegation through play-offs |
| 2019 | 5. divisjon | ↑ 1st | 22 | 16 | 3 | 3 | 69 | 24 | 51 | | Promoted |

== Stadium ==
SIF currently play their home matches at SIF Stadion, which is located in Bekkefaret in Stavanger. Prior to the 2009 season in 1. divisjon, the stadium was upgraded with a new seated spectator stand and improved facilities for players and match officials. SIF Stadion has an artificial turf.
