= SK Gjøvik-Lyn =

Norwegian sports club

- Full name: Sportsklubben Gjøvik-Lyn
- Founded: 1 February 1901; 124 years ago
- Ground: Gjøvik Stadion
- Chairman: Torbjørn Lønstad
- Coach: Espen Haug
- League: 3. divisjon
- 2024: 2. divisjon group 2, 13th of 14 (relegated)
- Website: gjoviklyn.no
Home colours	Away colours

SK Gjøvik-Lyn is a Norwegian football club based in Gjøvik, which was founded on 1 February 1902 as Sportsklubben Thor. They play in the Norwegian Second Division, the third highest division in the Norwegian football league system. Their home ground is Gjøvik Stadion.

The club's honours include winning the 1962 Norwegian Cup. The men's team played in the 3. divisjon in 2008, and in the 2. divisjon as late as in 2007. Ahead of the 2009 season, the first team joined the new team Gjøvik FF.

== History ==
The club was founded on 1 February 1902 as Sportsklubben Thor, but changed its name to Sportsklubben Lyn in 1903. The club had departments for both skiing and speed skating, but these departments left Lyn in 1910 and joined Gjøvik IF together with Gjøvik Skiklubb, Gjøvik Tennisklubb and Gjøvik Turnforening. The club had only their football department left and therefore changed its name to Fotballklubben Lyn. Lyn played its first final in the Norwegian Cup in 1914, but lost the final 2–4 against Frigg. After World War II, Fotballklubben Lyn changed their name to Sportsklubben Gjøvik-Lyn to distinguish themselves from Lyn from Oslo. Gjøvik-Lyn won the 1962 Norwegian Cup after Vard was defeated 2–0 in the final at Ullevaal Stadion on 28 October 1962. As Norwegian Cup winners, Gjøvik-Lyn qualified for the first round of the 1963–64 European Cup Winners' Cup, where they lost 0–7 on aggregate to Cypriot side APOEL.

On 15 April 1993, Gjøvik-Lyn was merged with Gjøvik SK. Ahead of the 2009 season, the first team joined the new team Gjøvik FF.

On 23 September 2013, the club decided to merge with Gjøvik FF and change the club's name to Fotballklubben Gjøvik-Lyn, effective from 1 January 2014.

On 10 March 2020, the name of the club was changed back to SK Gjøvik-Lyn.

== European Cup appearances ==
Season	Competition	Round	Country	Club	Home	Away	Aggregate
1963–64	European Cup Winners' Cup	First round	(Cyprus)	APOEL	0–1	0–6	0–7

== Recent history ==
Season	Division	Pos.	Pl.	W	D	L	GS	GA	P	Cup	Notes
2008	3. divisjon, gr. IØ	6	22	9	6	7	39	40	33	First qualifying round	
2009– 2013	Competed as a part of Gjøvik FF										
2014	2. divisjon, gr. 2	6	26	11	8	7	39	28	41	Second round	
2015	2. divisjon, gr. 2	7	26	12	3	11	48	47	39	Third round	
2016	2. divisjon, gr. 2	↓ 11	26	7	7	12	27	44	28	Second round	Relegated
2017	3. divisjon, gr. 2	7	26	10	4	12	47	61	34	First round	
2018	3. divisjon, gr. 5	7	26	10	5	11	39	48	35	First qualifying round	
2019	3. divisjon, gr. 5	3	26	15	0	11	63	50	45	First round	
2020	Season cancelled										
2021	3. divisjon, gr. 1	↑ 1	13	13	0	0	49	9	39	Second round	Promoted
2022	2. divisjon, gr. 2	5	26	12	4	10	43	59	40	Third round	
2023	2. divisjon, gr. 2	11	26	7	9	10	37	50	26	Fourth round	

== Current squad ==
As of 7 February 2025. Note: Flags indicate national team as defined under FIFA eligibility rules; some limited exceptions apply. Players may hold more than one non-FIFA nationality.

No.	Pos.	Nation	Player
1	GK	POR	Rafael Veloso
2	DF	NOR	Jesper Sydbøge
3	DF	NOR	Thorbjørn Kristiansen
4	DF	NOR	Per Kristian Jensen
5	DF	NOR	Alexander Bjørnhaug
6	DF	NOR	Asle Hastadklev
7	MF	NOR	Oliver Sandberg
8	MF	NOR	Jørgen Pettersen
9	FW	NOR	Lasse Tveten
11	MF	NOR	Mads Volden
12	GK	NOR	Even Eriksen

No.	Pos.	Nation	Player
13	MF	NOR	Andreas Berge
14	FW	NOR	Martin Dencker Opsahl
16	FW	NOR	Oliver Eriksen Hagen
18	DF	BDI	Aime Nihorimbere
19	MF	NOR	Emil Strandengen
20	FW	NOR	Erlend Busk Nilsson
21	MF	NOR	Konrad Thorvaldsen
23	DF	NOR	Theodor Wirkestad
25	DF	NOR	Tinius Skattum-Dahl
26	MF	NOR	Hynor Gashnjani
69	MF	NOR	Fredrik Bjørnerud

== Honours ==
- Norwegian Cup
  - Winners (1): 1962
