= 1931 in Norwegian football =

Football in Norway
Men's football
- NM: Odd

Results from Norwegian football in 1931. See also 1930 in Norwegian football and 1932 in Norwegian football

== Class A of local association leagues ==
Class A of local association leagues (kretsserier) is the predecessor of a national league competition.

| League | Champion |
|---|---|
| Østfold | Lisleby |
| Oslo | Gjøa |
| Follo | Ski |
| Aker | Nydalen |
| Romerike^{1} | Lillestrøm |
| Øvre Romerike | Haga |
| Oplandene | Lyn (Gjøvik) |
| Glommendalen | Kongsvinger |
| Nord-Østerdal | Bergmann |
| Trysil og Engerdal^{2} | Trysilgutten |
| Røyken og Hurum | Roy |
| Øvre Buskerud | Liv |
| Drammen og omegn | Mjøndalen |
| Vestfold | Fram (Larvik) |
| Grenland | Odd |
| Øvre Telemark | Rjukan |
| Aust-Agder | Grane (Arendal) |
| Vest-Agder | Flekkefjord |
| Rogaland | Stavanger IF |
| Hordaland | Voss |
| Bergen | Djerv |
| Sogn og Fjordane | Høyanger |
| Sunnmøre | Aalesund |
| Nordmøre og Romsdal | Kristiansund |
| Sør-Trøndelag | Ranheim |
| Trondhjem | Brage |
| Nord-Trøndelag | Steinkjer |
| Namdal | Harran |
| Helgeland | Mo |
| Lofoten og Vesterålen | Narvik/Nor |
| Troms | Skarp |
| Finnmark | Kirkenes |

- ^{1}In the following season, Romerike local association changed name to Vestre Romerike.
- ^{2}In the following season, Trysil og Engerdal local association changed name to Sør-Østerdal.

== Norwegian Cup ==
=== Final ===
18 October 1931

| Odd | 3–1 | Mjøndalen |
|---|---|---|
| Pedersen 5'; Eriksen 26'; Gundersen 87' | Report | Hval 42' |

Lovisenlund, Larvik
Attendance: 13,000
Referee: Bjarne H. Bech (Ørn)

== Northern Norwegian Cup ==
=== Final ===
| Tor | 3–1 | Mo |
|---|---|---|
| | Report |

== National team ==
| 25 May 1931 Nordic Championship | Denmark | 3–1 | Norway | Copenhagen, Denmark |
| CET (UTC+1) | Jørgensen 69', 73'; Christophersen 84' (pen.) | Report | Juve 43' | Stadium: Københavns Idrætspark; Attendance: 25,000; Referee: Willi Guyenz (Germany) |

| 21 June 1931 Friendly | Norway | 2–2 | Germany | Oslo, Norway |
| 19:00 CET (UTC+1) | Moe 25', 61' | Report | Bergmaier 1'; Ludwig 60' | Stadium: Ullevaal Stadion; Attendance: 17,000; Referee: Ivan Eklind (Sweden) |

| 6 September 1931 1929–32 Nordic Championship | Finland | 4–4 | Norway | Helsinki, Finland |
| CET (UTC+1) | Kanerva 3'; Salin 5'; Åström 49', 75' | Report | A. Børresen 9'; Johannessen 24'; Pettersen 32'; L. Børresen 56' | Stadium: Töölön Pallokenttä; Attendance: 700; Referee: Knut Lensing (Sweden) |

| 27 September 1931 1929–32 Nordic Championship | Norway | 2–1 | Sweden | Oslo, Norway |
| 13:15 CET (UTC+1) | Andersen 9'; Juve 38' | Report | Hansson 71' | Stadium: Ullevaal Stadion; Attendance: 28,208; Referee: Karl Weingärtner (Germany) |
