= 1932 in Norwegian football =

Football in Norway
Men's football
- NM: Ørn

Results from Norwegian football in 1932. See also 1931 in Norwegian football and 1933 in Norwegian football

== Østlandsligaen 1931/32 (Unofficial) ==
League discontinued after this season.

=== Hovedserien ===
Pos	Team	Pld	W	D	L	GF	GA	GD	Pts
1	Lisleby	14	10	1	3	55	21	+34	21
2	Odd	14	10	1	3	44	21	+23	21
3	Mjøndalen	14	9	1	4	51	29	+22	19
4	Fram (Larvik)	14	8	3	3	37	23	+14	19
5	Selbak	14	5	4	5	25	26	−1	14
6	Sarpsborg	14	5	4	5	22	26	−4	14
7	Lyn	14	6	2	6	22	35	−13	14
8	Fredrikstad	14	5	3	6	36	36	0	13
9	Frigg	14	3	7	4	24	27	−3	13
10	Tistedalen	14	5	3	6	27	31	−4	13
11	Strømsgodset	14	2	8	4	29	36	−7	12
12	Drammens BK	14	4	3	7	22	29	−7	11
13	Ørn	14	3	5	6	24	39	−15	11
14	Kvik (Halden)	14	2	4	8	22	36	−14	8
15	Birkebeineren	14	3	1	10	9	34	−25	7

Source: rsssf.no

=== Underserie I ===
Pos	Team	Pld	W	D	L	GF	GA	GD	Pts
1	Torp	7	6	1	0	23	8	+15	13
2	Moss	7	4	2	1	14	12	+2	10
3	Vålerengen	7	4	1	2	18	12	+6	9
4	Falk	7	4	1	2	16	11	+5	9
5	Tønsbergkameratene	7	3	0	4	10	11	−1	6
6	Gjøa	7	2	1	4	10	13	−3	5
7	Tønsberg Turn	7	1	0	6	8	15	−7	2
8	Strong	7	1	0	6	10	27	−17	2

Source: rsssf.no

=== Underserie II ===
Pos	Team	Pld	W	D	L	GF	GA	GD	Pts
1	Berger	6	5	0	1	19	9	+10	10
2	Holmestrand	6	4	1	1	11	7	+4	9
3	Skiold	6	4	0	2	28	13	+15	8
4	Drafn	6	3	1	2	16	18	−2	7
5	Dæhlenengen	6	2	1	3	12	13	−1	5
6	Skeid	6	1	1	4	11	24	−13	3
7	Trygg	6	0	0	6	9	23	−14	0

Source: rsssf.no

=== Underserie III ===
Pos	Team	Pld	W	D	L	GF	GA	GD	Pts
1	Larvik Turn	6	3	2	1	9	7	+2	8
2	Storm	6	3	1	2	9	5	+4	7
3	Grane (Skien)	6	3	1	2	12	14	−2	7
4	Pors	6	2	2	2	15	13	+2	6
5	Skiens BK	6	2	1	3	14	12	+2	5
6	Urædd	6	2	1	3	8	11	−3	5
7	Sandefjord	6	1	2	3	10	15	−5	4

Source: rsssf.no

== Class A of local association leagues ==
Class A of local association leagues (kretsserier) is the predecessor of a national league competition.

League	Champion
Østfold	Sarpsborg
Oslo	Vålerengen
Follo	Ski
Aker	Nydalen
Vestre Romerike	Lillestrøm
Østre Romerike	Sørumsand
Oplandene	Lyn (Gjøvik)
Glommendalen	Sander
Nord-Østerdal	Bergmann
Sør-Østerdal	Trysilgutten
Gudbrandsdal	Vinstra
Røyken og Hurum	Roy
Øvre Buskerud	Jevnaker
Drammen og omegn	Mjøndalen
Vestfold	Fram (Larvik)
Grenland	Pors
Øvre Telemark	Snøgg
Aust-Agder	Grane (Arendal)
Vest-Agder	Vigør
Rogaland	Viking
Hordaland^{1}	Voss
Bergen	Brann
Sogn og Fjordane	Høyanger
Sunnmøre	Aalesund
Nordmøre og Romsdal	Kristiansund
Sør-Trøndelag	Ranheim
Trondhjem	Brage
Nord-Trøndelag	Sverre
Namdal	Namsos
Helgeland	Mo
Lofoten og Vesterålen	Glimt
Troms	Tromsø Turn
Finnmark	Vardø

- ^{1}In the following season, Hordaland local association split into Midthordland and Sunnhordland.

== Norwegian Cup ==
=== Final ===
16 October 1932

Fredrikstad	6–1	Ørn
Børresen 8'; Sv. Moe 15', 24', 48', 82'; Johannesen 65'	Report	Thorstensen 10'

Marienlyst Stadion, Drammen
Attendance: 17,000
Referee: Oscar Arvid Carlsen (Lillestrøm)

== Northern Norwegian Cup ==
=== Final ===
Harstad	4–1	Sandnessjøen
	Report

== National team ==
=== Results ===
5 June 1932 Friendly	Norway	3–0	Estonia	Oslo, Norway
19:00 CET (UTC+1)	Juve 12', 20'; Pedersen 45'	Report		Stadium: Ullevaal Stadion; Attendance: 13,000; Referee: Yrjö Tuhkunen (Finland)

17 June 1932 Nordic Championship	Norway	2–1	Finland	Oslo, Norway
19:30 CET (UTC+1)	Johannesen 20', 51'	Report	Grönlund 35'	Stadium: Ullevaal Stadion; Attendance: 18,000; Referee: Carl Olsson (Sweden)

1 July 1932 Nordic Championship	Sweden	1–4	Norway	Gothenburg, Sweden
19:15 CET (UTC+1)	Holmberg 39' (pen.)	Report	Juve 8', 53'; Moe 69', 76'	Stadium: Gamla Ullevi; Attendance: 22,108; Referee: Raphaël van Praag (Belgium)

25 September 1932 Nordic Championship	Norway	1–2	Denmark	Oslo, Norway
13:15 CET (UTC+1)	Juve 69'	Report	Jørgensen 35'; Hansen 61'	Stadium: Ullevaal Stadion; Attendance: 32,400; Referee: George Rudd (England)

=== Nordic Football Championship ===
Table

	Team	Pld	W	D	L	GF		GA	GD	Pts
1	Norway	12	8	1	3	35	–	23	+12	17
2	Sweden	12	6	1	5	35	–	31	+4	13
3	Denmark	12	6	0	6	37	–	24	+13	12
4	Finland	12	2	2	8	23	–	52	–29	6
