= List of SK Brann records and statistics =

SK Brann is a Norwegian football club from Bergen, Norway. The club was founded in 1908 and is one of the most popular in Norway. They have won Eliteserien three times, and the Norwegian Football Cup seven times. As of the 2026 season Brann have played in the top tier of Norwegian football for 69 seasons, the second most of any club.

The list includes major honors won by Brann, as well as records set by the club and its players and managers.

== Honours ==
=== League ===
- Eliteserien:
  - Winners (3): 1961–62, 1963, 2007
  - Runners-up (8): 1951–52, 1975, 1997, 2000, 2006, 2016, 2023, 2024
  - Third place: (4): 1976, 1999, 2004, 2018
- Norwegian First Division:
  - Winners (1): 2022
  - Runners-up (1): 2015
- Kretsserien: (Note: Prior to the 1937–38 League of Norway the highest level of league play in Norway were various regional leagues organised by local footballing associations.)
  - Winners (22): 1912, 1913, 1914, 1915, 1916, 1917, 1918, 1919, 1920, 1921, 1922, 1923, 1924, 1926, 1927, 1928, 1929, 1930, 1932, 1934, 1935, 1937
  - Runners-up (5): 1911, 1925, 1931, 1933, 1936

=== Cup ===
- Norwegian Cup:
  - Winners (7): 1923, 1925, 1972, 1976, 1982, 2004, 2022
  - Runners-up (10): 1917, 1918, 1950, 1978, 1987, 1988, 1995, 1999, 2011, 2025-26

=== Awards ===
- Eliteserien Club of the Year
  - Winners (1): 2024
- Eliteserien Kit of the Year
  - Winners (5): 2017, 2018, 2019, 2021, 2023
- Eliteserien Pitch of the Year
  - Winners (1): 2024

== Players ==
All current players are in bold.
All stats accurate as of the end of the 2025 season.

=== Appearances ===
- Youngest first-team player: Håkon Lorentzen – 15 years, 280 days (against Start, Eliteserien, 9 May 2013)
- Oldest first-team player: Håkon Opdal – 39 years, 78 days (against Haugesund, Eliteserien, 28 August 2021)
- Most consecutive league appearances: **107** – Steinar Aase, 28 April 1974 – 1 October 1978

==== Most appearances ====
Competitive matches only, appearances as a substitute in brackets.

Players with most appearances for SK Brann
Rank	Player	Years	League	Cup	Europe	Other	Total
1	(Norway) Tore Nordtvedt	1963–1979	304 (3)	83 (5)	10 (1)	0	**397** (9)
2	(Norway) Geirmund "Geddi" Brendesæter	1991–2003	255 (21)	54 (4)	23 (0)	4 (2)	**336** (27)
3	(Norway) Erlend Hanstveit	1998–2008; 2014–2015	231 (20)	39 (1)	30 (2)	16 (2)	**316** (25)
4	(Norway) Erik Huseklepp	2005–2010; 2012–2016	248 (59)	28 (5)	23 (8)	9 (1)	**308** (73)
5	(Norway) Håkon Opdal	2001–2011; 2019–2021	234 (7)	28 (2)	20 (0)	14 (0)	**296** (9)
6	(Norway) Fredrik Haugen	2011–2020	249 (51)	20 (7)	4 (0)	3 (0)	**276** (58)
7	(Norway) Azar Karadas	1999–2001; 2007–2009; 2014–2019	206 (134)	31 (10)	24 (11)	2 (1)	**263** (156)
8	(Norway) Ruben Kristiansen	2015–2024	228 (8)	12 (1)	14 (0)	1 (0)	**255** (9)
9	(Norway) Kristoffer Barmen	2011–2021	225 (40)	22 (6)	2 (0)	1 (0)	**250** (46)
9	(Norway) Roy Wassberg	1989–1993; 1998–2004	201 (14)	33 (4)	13 (1)	3 (0)	**250** (19)

=== Goalscorers ===
- Most goals in a season in all competitions: **35** – Roald "Kniksen" Jensen and Rolf Birger "Pesen" Pedersen, 1961–62
- Most league goals in a season: **26** – Rolf Birger "Pesen" Pedersen, 1961–62 Hovedserien
- Top league scorer with fewest goals in a season: **3**
  - Frode Larsen and Harald Johannessen, 1970 Norwegian First Division
- Most goals scored in a match: **8**
  - Bjarne Johnsen v Aalesund, 26 August 1917
  - Bjarne Johnsen v Nornen, 5 May 1918
  - Trygve Titlestad v Årstad, 2 June 1932
- Goals in consecutive league matches: **8** consecutive matches – Rolf Birger "Pesen" Pedersen, 22 May 1960 to 31 August 1960
- Fastest goal: **11 seconds** – Erik Mjelde v Haugesund, Tippeligaen, 15 April 2011
- Fastest hat-trick: **2 minutes** – Kåre Kongsvik v Ny-Solheim, 22 September 1929
- Fastest four goals: **20 minutes** – Bjarne Johnsen v Nornen, 5 May 1918
- Most hat-tricks: **20** – Finn Berstad (19 September 1920 – 12 May 1932)

==== Most goals ====
Competitive matches only. Matches played (including as a substitute) appear in brackets.

Top goalscorers for SK Brann
Rank	Player	Years	League	Cup	Europe	Other	Total
1	(Norway) Finn Berstad	1918–1935	57 (39)	78 (66)	0 (0)	0 (0)	**135** (105)
2	(Norway) Rolf Birger "Pesen" Pedersen	1957–1968; 1972	86 (168)	42 (55)	0 (0)	2 (3)	**130** (226)
3	(Norway) Gunnar Skagen	1945–1956	69 (93)	48 (41)	0 (0)	6 (3)	**123** (137)
4	(Norway) Thorstein Helstad	1998–2002; 2006–2008	89 (147)	10 (17)	4 (23)	1 (4)	**104** (191)
5	(Norway) Steinar Aase	1973–1978; 1984–1985	63 (154)	27 (40)	3 (6)	0 (0)	**93** (200)
6	(Norway) Bjørn Tronstad	1974–1982	62 (124)	28 (35)	2 (6)	0 (0)	**92** (165)
7	(Norway) **Bård Finne**	2012–2013; 2021–present	56 (153)	31 (26)	3 (21)	0 (1)	**90** (201)
8	(Norway) Roald "Kniksen" Jensen	1960–1964; 1971–1973	61 (122)	24 (32)	1 (4)	1 (2)	**87** (160)
9	(Norway) Bjarne Johnsen	1916–1928; 1930–1932	33 (21)	51 (50)	0 (0)	0 (0)	**84** (71)
10	(Norway) Kåre Kongsvik	1921–1922; 1925–1932	39 (25)	35 (33)	0 (0)	0 (0)	**74** (58)

=== Transfers ===
==== Highest transfer fees paid ====
	Player	From	Fee	Date
1	(Senegal) **Cheikh Mbacke Diop**	(Croatia) Lokomotiva Zagreb	30 million NOK	March 2026
2	(Norway) **Noah Holm**	(Norway) Rosenborg	20 million NOK	September 2025
3	(Iceland) **Kristall Máni Ingason**	(Denmark) Sønderjyske	16 million NOK	January 2026
4	(Norway) Martin Andresen	(Norway) Stabæk	12 million NOK	December 2004
5	(Jamaica) Rodolph Austin	(Jamaica) Portmore United	10 million NOK	February 2009
6	(Norway) Petter Vaagan Moen	(Norway) HamKam	10 million NOK	June 2005
7	(The Gambia) Njogu Demba-Nyrén	(Denmark) Esbjerg	9.5 million NOK	January 2008
8	(Ivory Coast) Daouda Bamba	(Norway) Kristiansund	8 million NOK	August 2018
9	(Denmark) Magnus Warming	(Italy) Torino	8 million NOK	July 2023
10	(Norway) **Leo Cornic**	(Norway) Tromsø	8 million NOK	August 2026

==== Highest transfer fees received ====
	Player	To	Fee	Date
1	(Norway) Eivind Helland	(Italy) Bologna	100 million NOK	January 2026
2	(Norway) Aune Heggebø	(England) West Bromwich Albion	65 million NOK	July 2025
3	(Belgium) Denzel De Roeve	(Belgium) Union Saint-Gilloise	47 million NOK	August 2026
4	(Norway) Felix Horn Myhre	(England) West Bromwich Albion	40 million NOK	August 2026
5	(Denmark) Emil Kornvig	(Poland) Widzew Łódź	35 million NOK	January 2026
6	(Norway) David Møller Wolfe	(Netherlands) AZ Alkmaar	30 million NOK	May 2023
7	(Austria) Paul Scharner	(England) Wigan Athletic	30 million NOK	December 2005
8	(Nigeria) Seyi Olofinjana	(England) Wolverhampton Wanderers	22 million NOK	July 2004
9	(Norway) Thorstein Helstad	(France) Le Mans	16 million NOK	July 2008
10	(Norway) Ole Didrik Blomberg	(Norway) Bodø/Glimt	15 million NOK	January 2025

=== Honours ===
==== Players with the most titles won at the club ====
- (Norway) Roald "Kniksen" Jensen (3)
  - 1961–62 Hovedserien, 1963 Norwegian First Division, 1972 Norwegian Football Cup
- (Norway) Tore Nordtvedt (3)
  - 1963 Norwegian First Division, 1972 Norwegian Football Cup, 1976 Norwegian Football Cup

=== Individual awards ===
Kniksen Honorary Award

- (Norway) Per Egil Ahlsen – 1992

Kniksen Award for Goalkeeper of the Year

- (Norway) Håkon Opdal – 2006, 2007
- (Poland) Piotr Leciejewski – 2016

Kniksen Award for Defender of the Year

- (Norway) Tore Pedersen – 1993

Kniksen Award for Midfielder of the Year

- (Norway) Per Egil Ahlsen – 1990

Kniksen Award for Attacker of the Year

- (Norway) Mons Ivar Mjelde – 1996
- (Norway) Thorstein Helstad – 2000, 2007

First Division Player of the Year

- (Norway) Mathias Rasmussen – 2022

Bataljonen's Brann Player of the Year

- (Norway) Roy Wassberg – 2000
- (Norway) Raymond Kvisvik – 2001, 2003
- (Norway) Tommy Knarvik – 2002
- (Norway) Ragnvald Soma – 2004
- (Austria) Paul Scharner – 2005
- (Norway) Håkon Opdal – 2006, 2019
- (Norway) Thorstein Helstad – 2007
- (Iceland) Ólafur Örn Bjarnason – 2008
- (Norway) Erik Huseklepp – 2009
- (Norway) Petter Vaagan Moen – 2010
- (Jamaica) Rodolph Austin – 2011
- (Poland) Piotr Leciejewski – 2012, 2013
- (Senegal) Stéphane Badji – 2014
- (Norway) Vadim Demidov – 2015, 2016
- (Netherlands) Vito Wormgoor – 2017
- (Norway) Fredrik Haugen – 2018
- (Norway) Ole Martin Kolskogen – 2020
- (Norway) Ruben Kristiansen – 2021
- (Norway) Mathias Rasmussen – 2022
- (Norway) **Bård Finne** – 2023
- (Norway) Felix Horn Myhre – 2024
- (Denmark) Emil Kornvig – 2025

Bataljonen's Young Brann Player of the Year

- (Norway) Arve Walde – 2004
- (Norway) Fredrik Haugen – 2011
- (Norway) Kristoffer Larsen – 2012
- (Norway) Henrik Gjesdal – 2013
- (Norway) Kasper Skaanes – 2014
- (Norway) Jonas Grønner – 2016
- (Norway) Markus Olsen Pettersen – 2018
- (Norway) Ole Martin Kolskogen – 2020
- (Norway) David Møller Wolfe – 2022
- (Norway) **Jonas Torsvik** – 2023
- (Norway) Eivind Helland – 2024, 2025

=== International ===
First international:

- (Norway) Sigurd Wathne against Sweden (26 May 1918)

Most international caps (total):

- (Iceland) Birkir Már Sævarsson – **103**

Most international caps as a Brann player

- (Iceland) Birkir Már Sævarsson – **38**

== Managers ==
- First manager: Donald Colman
- Longest-serving manager: Oddvar Hansen (1955–1957, 1960–1963, 1965–1968)

=== Individual awards ===
Kniksen Award for Manager of the Year

- (Norway) Mons Ivar Mjelde – 2007
- (Norway) Lars Arne Nilsen – 2016

Eliteserien Manager of the Year

- (Norway) Eirik Horneland – 2023

First Division Manager of the Year

- (Norway) Eirik Horneland – 2022

== Chairs ==
Upon the club's founding in 1908 Hans Larsen was appointed as the first chairman. The current chair, Arild Mjøs Andersen, is Brann's 52nd chair, with several chairs having multiple spells in office (counted separately.)

Era	President
1908	Hans Larsen
1909	Hjalmar Negaard
1910–1911	Christen K. Gran
1912	Johan Martens jr.
1913–1922	Christen K. Gran
1923–1924	Bjarne Johnsen
1925	Godtfred Hanssen
1926–1927	Gerhard Gran
1928–1930	Christen K. Gran
1931	Godtfred Hanssen
1932–1933	Hugo Hofstad
1934–1935	Finn Berstad
1936–1937	Edvin Ellingsen
1938–1939	Frithjof B. Hansen
1940–1941	Christen K. Gran
1941–1945	Office vacant
1945	Christen K. Gran
1946–1947	Joachim Wiesener
1948–1949	Odd Rasmussen
1950–1952	Jacob L. Berstad
1953–1956	Audun Frønsdal
1957–1958	Christen K. Gran jr.
1959–1960	Knut Berge
1961–1963	Kåre Naustdal
1964–1965	Leiv Sælensminde
1966–1968	Gunnar Gran
1969–1971	Harald M. Hvide
1972–1973	Ingvard Børhaug
1974	Kjell Friis-Ottesen
1975–1978	Walther Solberg
1979–1980	Ingmar Johansen
1981–1983	Rolf Wembstad
1984	Torbjørn Borge
1985–1986	Svein Sætersdal
1987–1988	Asbjørn Rognaldsen
1989	Rolf Birger Pedersen
1990	Knut N. Kristiansen
1991–1992	Magne Revheim
1993	Knut N. Kristiansen
1994–1995	Lambert Wulf
1996–1998	Lars-Henrik Berge
1999	Harald Schjelderup
2000–2001	Harald Andersen
2001–2009	Magne Revheim
2009–2010	Hans Brandtun
2010–2013	Lars Moldestad
2013–2014	Mette Nora Sætre
2014–2015	Rolf Barmen
2015	Henrik Lie-Nielsen
2015–2021	Eivind K. Lunde
2021	Birger Grevstad
2022–2026	Aslak Sverdrup
2026–present	Arild Mjøs Andersen

== Team records ==
=== Matches ===
- First match: 1–1 v Bergens FK, 1 January 1909
- First competitive match: 8–0 v Bergens SK, 21 June 1911
- First Norwegian Football Cup match: 4–6 v Stavanger, 14 September 1913
- First competitive match at Brann Stadion: 2–1 v Trygg, 10 August 1919
- First Norgesserien match: 1–2 v Djerv, 3 August 1937
- First Hovedserien match: 3–4 v Vålerenga, 31 July 1948
- First 1. divisjon match: 0–2 v Gjøvik-Lyn, 28 April 1963
- First Tippeligaen match: 1–0 v Strømsgodset, 28 April 1990
- First Eliteserien match: 1–1 v Tromsø, 2 April 2017
- First European match: 2–0 v Gżira United, 19 September 1973

==== Record wins ====
- Record win: 17–0 v Hardy, Kretsserien, 18 May 1919
- Record league win: 17–0 v Hardy, Kretsserien, 18 May 1919
- Record Norwegian Football Cup win:

14–0 v Aalesund, 26 August 1917
14–0 v Hovding, 17 April 2013

- Record European win: 8–0 v Carmarthen Town, Europa League first qualifying round, first leg, 19 July 2007
- Record home win: 17–0 v Hardy, Kretsserien, 18 May 1919
- Record away win:

14–0 v Aalesund, Norwegian Football Cup, 26 August 1917
14–0 v Hovding, Norwegian Football Cup, 17 April 2013

==== Record defeats ====
- Record defeat: 0–10 v Rosenborg, Tippeligaen, 5 May 1996
- Record league defeat: 0–10 v Rosenborg, Tippeligaen, 5 May 1996
- Record Norwegian Football Cup defeat: 0-8

v Kvik Halden, 26 September 1915
v Molde, 23 July 2008

- Record European defeat: 0–7 v Queens Park Rangers, UEFA Cup, 29 September 1976
- Record home defeat:

1–8 v Skeid, Norwegian Football Cup, 3 July 1938
0–7 v Moss, Norwegian Football Cup, 8 September 1940
1–8 v Fredrikstad, Hovedserien, 24 August 1952
0–7 v Lyn, 1. divisjon, 8 August 1964
0–7 v Queens Park Rangers, UEFA Cup, 29 September 1976

- Record away defeat: 0–10 v Rosenborg, Tippeligaen, 5 May 1996

==== Streaks ====
- Longest winning streak (all competitions): 12 matches
  - 9 May 2022 to 7 July 2022
  - 18 July 2022 to 2 October 2022
- Longest unbeaten streak (all competitions): 29 matches, 3 April 2022 to 2 October 2022
- Longest winless streak (all competitions): 13 matches, 21 August 1948 to 26 May 1949
- Longest losing streak (all competitions): 6 matches
  - 10 September 1989 to 8 October 1989
  - 12 August 2002 to 1 September 2002
  - 9 May 2021 to 27 May 2021
- Longest winning streak (league): 12 matches, 18 July 2022 to 2 October 2022
- Longest unbeaten streak (league): 26 matches, 3 April 2022 to 2 October 2022
- Longest drawing streak (league): 8 matches, 16 August 1992 to 18 October 1992
- Longest winless streak (league): 12 matches, 24 June 1979 to 14 October 1979
- Longest losing streak (league): 6 matches
  - 6 August 1979 to 16 September 1979
  - 13 July 1981 to 23 August 1981
  - 9 May 2021 to 27 May 2021
- Longest scoring streak (league): 33 matches, 5 December 2021 to 10 April 2023
- Longest non-scoring streak (league): 5 matches, 14 June 1964 to 13 August 1964
- Longest clean sheet streak (league): 7 matches, 14 August 2022 to 2 October 2022
- Longest goal conceding streak (league): 27 matches, 21 August 1994 to 27 August 1995

==== Wins/draws/defeats in a season ====
- Most wins in a league season: 26 – 2022
- Most draws in a league season: 12 – 1992
- Most defeats in a league season: 17 – 2014
- Fewest wins in a league season: 1 – 1948–49
- Fewest draws in a league season: 0 – 1949–50
- Fewest defeats in a league season: 0 – 1947–48, 1953–54, 1960–61

=== Goals ===
- Most league goals scored in a season: 95 – 2022
- Fewest league goals scored in a season: 9 – 1952–53
- Most league goals conceded in a season: 55 – 2021
- Fewest league goals conceded in a season: 5 – 1947–48

=== Points ===
- Most points in a season:

Two points for a win:

46 in 30 matches, 1961–62
35 in 22 matches, 1986
24 in 18 matches, 1963
21 in 14 matches, 1946–47
21 in 12 matches, 1953–54, 1960–61
19 in 10 matches, 1947–48

Three points for a win:

81 in 30 matches, 2022
54 in 26 matches, 2007
39 in 22 matches, 1990

- Fewest points in a season:

Two points for a win:

46 in 30 matches, 1961–62
10 in 22 matches, 1979
11 in 18 matches, 1971
4 in 14 matches, 1948–49
19 in 12 matches, 1956–57
10 in 10 matches, 1938–39

Three points for a win:

26 in 30 matches, 2021
27 in 26 matches, 2002
24 in 22 matches, 1992

=== Attendances ===
- Highest home game attendance: 24,800 v Fredrikstad, 1 October 1961
- Highest away game attendance: 55,000 v Marseille, 27 August 2008
- Highest season average attendance (league): 17,225 (2007)
- Lowest season average attendance (league) (Note: Excluding seasons affected by COVID-19 restrictions): 5,531 (1948–49)
- Seasons with highest average league attendance in Norway: 18 (1958–59, 1959–60, 1961–62, 1963, 1964, 1975, 1976, 1977, 1978, 1979, 1983, 1987, 1991, 1996, 2001, 2023, 2024, 2025)
