= 1929–32 Nordic Football Championship =

Tournament details
- Host countries: Denmark; Finland; Norway; Sweden
- Dates: 14 June 1929 – 25 September 1932
- Teams: 4

Final positions
- Champions: Norway (1st title)
- Runners-up: Sweden
- Third place: Denmark
- Fourth place: Finland

Tournament statistics
- Matches played: 24
- Goals scored: 130 (5.42 per match)
- Top scorer(s): (Norway) Jørgen Juve (17 goals)

The 1929–32 Nordic Football Championship was the second Nordic Football Championship staged. Four Nordic countries participated, Denmark, Finland, Norway and Sweden. The tournament was arranged by the Swedish Football Association (SvFF) which celebrated its 25th anniversary. The trophy was named the Guldkrus (Golden Cup). A total of 24 matches were played and 130 goals scored giving an average of 5.42 goals per match.

== Results ==
=== 1929 ===
14 June 1929
19:15 (UTC+1:00)

Sweden	3-1	Finland
Lundahl 38' (pen.), 44'; Holmberg 76'	Report	Koponen 75'

Stockholms Stadion, Stockholm
Attendance: 16,982
Referee: Frederik Schieldrop (Norway)
16 June 1929
13:00 (UTC+1:00)

Sweden	3-2	Denmark
Nilsson 9'; Kaufeldt 31'; Kroon 49'	Report	Larsen 64'; Uldaler 66'

Slottsskogsvallen, Gothenburg
Attendance: 20,553
Referee: Peco Bauwens (Germany)
18 June 1929
19:30 (UTC+1:00)

Norway	4-0	Finland
Juve 8', 15', 73'; Andersen 30'	Report

Ullevaal, Oslo
Attendance: 12,000
Referee: Carl Olsson (Sweden)
23 June 1929
13:30 (UTC+1:00)

Denmark	2-5	Norway
Jørgensen 32'; Christophersen 82' (pen.)	Report	Juve 41', 60'; Berg-Johannesen 69'; Andersen 72', 77'

Idrætsparken, Copenhagen
Attendance: 20,000
Referee: Alfred Birlem (Germany)
29 September 1929
13:00 (UTC+1:00)

Norway	2-1	Sweden
Juve 21'; Gundersen 66'	Report	Kroon 33'

Ullevaal, Oslo
Attendance: 25,000
Referee: Lauritz Andersen (Denmark)
13 October 1929
13:30 (UTC+1:00)

Denmark	8-0	Finland
Jørgensen 11', 41', 73'; Hansen 30', 34'; Uldaler 61'; Eriksen 70'; Rohde 87'	Report

Idrætsparken, Copenhagen
Attendance: 20,000
Referee: Moritz Fuchs (Germany)

=== 1930 ===
1 June 1930
13:00 (UTC+1:00)

Norway	6-2	Finland
H. Pettersen 12'; Juve 17', 42', 66'; M.Pettersen 30', 88'	Report	Saario 76'; Åström 82'

Ullevaal, Oslo
Attendance: 13,000
Referee: Otto Remke (Denmark)
16 June 1930
19:00 (UTC+2:00)

Finland	1-6	Denmark
Kanerva 88'	Report	Hansen 1'; Kleven 13'; Uldaler 17', 50'; Eriksen 60'; Jørgensen 63'

Tölö bollplan, Helsinki
Attendance: 6,000
Referee: Carl Olsson (Sweden)
22 June 1930
13:30 (UTC+1:00)

Denmark	6-1	Sweden
Jørgensen 17', 65', 88'; Eriksen 45'; Kleven 79'; Christophersen 90' (pen.)	Report	Nilsson 66'

Idrætsparken, Copenhagen
Attendance: 28,000
Referee: Karl Weingärtner (Germany)
6 July 1930
14:00 (UTC+1:00)

Sweden	6-3	Norway
Lundahl 5', 13', 48'; Kroon 29', 56'; Dahl 44'	Report	Juve 16', 42', 47'

Stockholms Stadion, Stockholm
Attendance: 18,000
Referee: Johannes de Wolf (Netherlands)
21 September 1930
13:00 (UTC+1:00)

Norway	1-0	Denmark
Kongsvik 82'	Report

Ullevaal, Oslo
Attendance: 27,000
Referee: Harvid Abrahamsson (Sweden)
28 September 1930
13:00 (UTC+2:00)

Finland	4-4	Sweden
Lehtinen 9', 40', 41'; Koponen 15'	Report	Karlsson 26', 53', 64'; Andersson 60'

Tölö bollplan, Helsinki
Attendance: 7,152
Referee: Otto Remke (Denmark)

=== 1931 ===
25 May 1931
13:30 (UTC+1:00)

Denmark	3-1	Norway
Jørgensen 69', 73'; Christophersen 84' (pen.)	Report	Juve 43' (pen.)

Idrætsparken, Copenhagen
Attendance: 25,000
Referee: Willy Guyenz (Germany)
28 June 1931
14:00 (UTC+1:00)

Sweden	3-1	Denmark
Gardtman 47'; Rydell 73', 88' (pen.)	Report	Jørgensen 19'

Stockholms Stadion, Stockholm
Attendance: 20,000
Referee: Alfred Birlem (Germany)
3 July 1931
19:00 (UTC+1:00)

Sweden	8-2	Finland
Gardtman 12'; Zetterberg 18', 25', 30', 55'; Hansson 35', 65', 73'	Report	Lintamo 78'; Grönlund 88' (pen.)

Stockholms Stadion, Stockholm
Attendance: 20,000
Referee: Otto Remke (Denmark)
6 September 1931
15:15 (UTC+2:00)

Finland	4-4	Norway
Kanerva 3'; Salin 5'; Åström 49', 75'	Report	A.Børresen 9'; Johannesen 24'; M.Pettersen 32'; L.Børresen 56'

Töölön Pallokenttä, Helsinki
Attendance: 700
Referee: Knut Lensing (Sweden)
27 September 1931
13:15 (UTC+1:00)

Norway	2-1	Sweden
Andersen 9'; Juve 38'	Report	Hansson 71'

Ullevaal, Oslo
Attendance: 28,208
Referee: Karl Weingärtner (Germany)
11 October 1931
13:30 (UTC+1:00)

Denmark	2-3	Finland
Uldaler 20'; Malmgren 23' (o.g.)	Report	Åström 40'; Strömsten 76', 85'

Idrætsparken, Copenhagen
Attendance: 22,000
Referee: Ivan Eklind (Sweden)

=== 1932 ===
10 June 1932
15:30 (UTC+2:00)

Finland	1-3	Sweden
Grönlund 3'	Report	Nilsson 2'; Gardtman 51'; Holmberg 64' (pen.)

Tölö bollplan, Helsinki
Attendance: 7,000
Referee: Thoralf Kristiansen (Norway)
17 June 1932
19:30 (UTC+1:00)

Norway	2-1	Finland
Johannesen 20', 51'	Report	Grönlund 35'

Ullevaal, Oslo
Attendance: 18,000
Referee: Carl Olsson (Sweden)
19 June 1932
13:00 (UTC+1:00)

Denmark	3-1	Sweden
Hansen 4'; Petersen 23'; Jørgensen 80'	Report	Kroon 13'

Idrætsparken, Copenhagen
Attendance: 28,000
Referee: Moritz Fuchs (Germany)
1 July 1932
19:15 (UTC+1:00)

Sweden	1-4	Norway
Holmberg 39' (pen.)	Report	Juve 8', 53'; Moe 69', 76'

Ullevi, Gothenburg
Attendance: 22,108
Referee: Raphaël van Praag (Belgium)
30 August 1932
18:00 (UTC+2:00)

Finland	4-2	Denmark
Malmgren 26', 55'; Lintamo 35', 70'	Report	Jørgensen 19', 63'

Tölö bollplan, Helsinki
Attendance: 7,500
Referee: Elias Englund (Sweden)
25 September 1932
13:15 (UTC+1:00)

Norway	1-2	Denmark
Juve 69'	Report	Jørgensen 35'; Hansen 61'

Ullevaal, Oslo
Attendance: 40,000
Referee: Reginald Rudd (England)

== Table ==
	Team	Pld	W	D	L	GF	GA	GD	Pts
1	Norway	12	8	1	3	35	23	+12	17
2	Sweden	12	6	1	5	35	31	+4	13
3	Denmark	12	6	0	6	37	24	+13	12
4	Finland	12	2	2	8	23	52	–29	6

== Winner ==
1929–32 Nordic Football Championship

Norway
first title

== Statistics ==
=== Goalscorers ===
There were 130 goals scored in 24 matches, for an average of 5.42 goals per match.

17 goals

- (Norway) Jørgen Juve

15 goals

- (Denmark) Pauli Jørgensen

5 goals

- (Denmark) Henry Hansen
- (Sweden) Knut Kroon
- (Sweden) Harry Lundahl
- (Denmark) Kaj Uldaler

4 goals

- (Finland) Gunnar Åström
- (Sweden) Sune Zetterberg
- (Sweden) Evert Hansson

3 goals

- (Denmark) Knud Christophersen
- (Denmark) Svend Aage Eriksen
- (Finland) Ernst Grönlund
- (Finland) Nuutti Lintamo
- (Finland) Lauri Lehtinen
- (Norway) Erling Andersen
- (Norway) Morten Pettersen
- (Norway) Finn Johannesen
- (Sweden) Bertil Karlsson
- (Sweden) Rolf Gardtman
- (Sweden) John Nilsson
- (Sweden) Karl Erik Holmberg

2 goals

- (Denmark) Eyolf Kleven
- (Finland) Olof Strömsten
- (Finland) Jarl Malmgren
- (Finland) Aulis Koponen
- (Finland) William Kanerva
- (Norway) Sten Moe
- (Sweden) Sven Rydell

1 goal

- (Denmark) Einar Larsen
- (Denmark) Michael Rohde
- (Denmark) Svend Petersen
- (Finland) Sulo Saario
- (Finland) Holger Salin
- (Norway) Kåre Kongsvik
- (Norway) Leif Børresen
- (Norway) Harald Pettersen
- (Norway) Einar Andersen
- (Norway) Arne Børresen
- (Norway) Sverre Berg-Johannesen
- (Norway) Olav Gundersen
- (Sweden) Åke Andersson
- (Sweden) Per Kaufeldt
- (Sweden) Albin Dahl

1 own goal

- (Finland) Jarl Malmgren (against Denmark)

== See also ==
Balkan Cup
Baltic Cup
Central European International Cup
Mediterranean Cup
