= 1930 in Norwegian football =

Football in Norway
Men's football
- NM: Ørn

Norwegian football results from 1930. See also 1929 in Norwegian football and 1931 in Norwegian football

== Østlandsligaen 1929/30 (Unofficial) ==
The league discontinued in 1930/31, but re-appeared one final time in 1931/32.

=== Hovedserien ===
Pos	Team	Pld	W	D	L	GF	GA	GD	Pts	Relegation
1	Mjøndalen	14	12	1	1	48	17	+31	25	
2	Lisleby	14	11	0	3	70	14	+56	22	
3	Sarpsborg	14	9	1	4	39	19	+20	19	
4	Frigg	14	9	0	5	55	32	+23	18	
5	Selbak	14	9	0	5	34	28	+6	18	
6	Fredrikstad	14	8	1	5	45	37	+8	17	
7	Kvik (Halden)	14	8	0	6	42	32	+10	16	
8	Drammens BK	14	6	2	6	28	31	−3	14	
9	Strømsgodset	14	6	2	6	32	38	−6	14	
10	Fram (Larvik)	14	4	3	7	25	31	−6	11	
11	Odd	14	5	1	8	28	46	−18	11	
12	Urædd	14	2	2	10	29	62	−33	6	Relegated
13	Storm	14	3	0	11	24	59	−35	6	Relegated
14	Strong	14	0	3	11	16	67	−51	3	Relegated
15	Ørn	14	4	2	8	34	36	−2	0	Disqualified

Source: rsssf.no

Promoted: Birkebeineren, Lyn, Tistedalen.

== Class A of local association leagues ==
Class A of local association leagues (kretsserier) is the predecessor of a national league competition.

League	Champion
Østfold	Lisleby
Oslo	Lyn
Follo	Ski
Aker	Stabæk
Romerike	Lillestrøm
Øvre Romerike	Haga
Oplandene	Hamar IL
Glommendalen	Grue
Nord-Østerdal	Bergmann
Trysil og Engerdal	Nybergsund
Røyken og Hurum	Roy
Øvre Buskerud	Kongsberg
Drammen og omegn	Mjøndalen
Vestfold	Ørn
Grenland	Odd
Øvre Telemark	Tell
Aust-Agder	Kragerø
Vest-Agder	Flekkefjord
Rogaland	Viking
Hordaland	Stord
Bergen	Brann
Sogn og Fjordane	Høyanger
Sunnmøre	Rollon
Nordmøre og Romsdal	Kristiansund
Sør-Trøndelag	Ranheim
Trondhjem	Brage
Nord-Trøndelag	Steinkjer
Namdal	Namsos
Helgeland	Mosjøen
Lofoten og Vesterålen	Narvik/Nor
Troms	Skarp
Finnmark	Kirkenes

== Norwegian Cup ==
=== Final ===
19 October 1930

Ørn	4–2	Drammens BK
Fredriksen 16'; Nielsen or Olsen 52'; Dahl 72', 85'	Report	Trogstad 15', 83'

Brann Stadion, Bergen
Attendance: 6,000
Referee: Reidar Randers-Johansen (Trygg)

== Northern Norwegian Cup ==
=== Final ===
Glimt	3–0	Harstad
	Report

== National team ==
1 June 1930 1929–32 Nordic Championship	Norway	6–2	Finland	Oslo, Norway
13:00 (UTC+1); Match 81	H. Pettersen 12'; Juve 17', 42', 66'; M. Pettersen 30', 88'	Report	Saario 66'; Åström 82'	Stadium: Ullevaal Stadion; Attendance: 13,000; Referee: Otto Remke (Denmark)

19 June 1930 Friendly	Norway	3–0	Switzerland	Oslo, Norway
19:30 (UTC+1); Match 82	Juve 5', 81'; Krupp 88'	Report		Stadium: Ullevaal Stadion; Attendance: 17,000; Referee: Alfred Birlem (Germany)

6 July 1930 1929–32 Nordic Championship	Sweden	6–3	Norway	Stockholm, Sweden
14:00 (UTC+1); Match 83	Lundahl 5', 13', 48'; Kroon 29', 56'; Dahl 44'	Report	Juve 16', 42', 47'	Stadium: Olympic Stadium; Attendance: 18,000; Referee: Jan De Wolf (Netherlands)

21 September 1930 1929–32 Nordic Championship	Norway	1–0	Denmark	Oslo, Norway
13:00 (UTC+1); Match 84	Kongsvik 82'	Report		Stadium: Ullevaal Stadion; Attendance: 27,000; Referee: Harvid Abrahamsson (Sweden)

2 November 1930 Friendly	Germany	1–1	Norway	Breslau, Germany
14:30 (UTC+1); Match 85	Hanke 55'	Report	Nilsen 72'	Stadium: Schlesierkampfbahn; Attendance: 41,000; Referee: Hans Boekman (Netherlands)
