= Denmark national football team results (1930–1949) =

This is a list of the Denmark national football team results from 1908 to 1929.

During this period, Denmark played 87 games. They played in four editions of the Nordic Football Championship in 1929-32, 1933-36, 1937-47 and 1948-51, but failed to win a single one.

== 1930s ==
#	Date	Venue	Opponents	Score	Comp	Denmark scorers
74	1930-06-16	Pallokenttä, Helsinki (A)	Finland	6–1	NC	Henry Hansen, Eyolf Kleven, Kai Uldaler (2), Svend Aage Eriksen, Pauli Jørgensen
75	1930-06-22	Idrætsparken, Copenhagen (H)	Sweden	6–1	NC	Pauli Jørgensen (3), Svend Aage Eriksen, Eyolf Kleven, Knud Christophersen
76	1930-09-07	Idrætsparken, Copenhagen (H)	Germany	6–3	F	Eyolf Kleven, Pauli Jørgensen (3), Ernst Nilsson, Knud Christophersen
77	1930-09-21	Ullevaal Stadion, Oslo (A)	Norway	0–1	NC	
78	1931-05-25	Idrætsparken, Copenhagen (H)	Norway	3–1	NC	Pauli Jørgensen (2), Knud Christophersen
79	1931-06-14	Idrætsparken, Copenhagen (H)	Netherlands	0–2	F	
80	1931-06-28	Stockholms Stadium, Stockholm (A)	Sweden	1–3	NC	Pauli Jørgensen
81	1931-09-27	Hindenburg Stadium, Hanover (A)	Germany	2–4	F	Ernst Nielsen, Pauli Jørgensen
82	1931-10-11	Idrætsparken, Copenhagen (H)	Finland	2–3	NC	Kai Uldaler, own goal (Jarl Malmgren)
83	1932-06-05	Idrætsparken, Copenhagen (H)	Belgium	3–4	F	Henry Hansen, Knud Christophersen, Pauli Jørgensen
84	1932-06-19	Idrætsparken, Copenhagen (H)	Sweden	3–1	NC	Henry Hansen, Svend Petersen, Pauli Jørgensen
85	1932-08-30	Pallokenttä, Helsinki (A)	Finland	2–4	NC	Pauli Jørgensen (2)
86	1932-09-25	Ullevaal Stadion, Oslo (A)	Norway	2–1	NC	Pauli Jørgensen, Henry Hansen
87	1932-10-09	Idrætsparken, Copenhagen (H)	Scotland (Note: Scotland was represented by its amateur team and does not regard the match as a full international.)	3–1	F	Pauli Jørgensen, Knud Christophersen, Georg Taarup
88	1933-06-11	Idrætsparken, Copenhagen (H)	Norway	2–2	NC	Eigil Thielsen (2)
89	1933-06-18	Stockholms Stadium, Stockholm (A)	Sweden	3–2	NC	Pauli Jørgensen, Eyolf Kleven (2)
90	1933-10-11	Idrætsparken, Copenhagen (H)	Finland	2–0	NC	Georg Taarup, Kai Uldaler
91	1933-11-26	Heysel Stadion, Brussels (A)	Belgium	2–2	F	Kai Uldaler (2)
92	1934-05-21	Idrætsparken, Copenhagen (H)	Poland	4–2	F	Kai Uldaler (2), Pauli Jørgensen (2)
93	1934-06-17	Idrætsparken, Copenhagen (H)	Sweden	3–5	NC	Kai Uldaler, Pauli Jørgensen (2)
94	1934-07-03	Tölö bollplan, Helsinki (A)	Finland	1–2	NC	Carl Lundsteen
95	1934-09-23	Ullevaal Stadion, Oslo (A)	Norway	1–3	NC	Carl Lundsteen
96	1934-10-07	Idrætsparken, Copenhagen (H)	Germany	2–5	F	Carl Lundsteen, Carl Stoltz
97	1935-06-16	Gamla Ullevi, Gothenburg (A)	Sweden	1–3	NC	Pauli Jørgensen
98	1935-06-23	Idrætsparken, Copenhagen (H)	Norway	1–0	NC	own goal (Thøger Nordbø)
99	1935-10-06	Idrætsparken, Copenhagen (H)	Finland	5–1	NC	Eigil Thielsene, Kai Uldaler (2), Knud Sørensen, Eyolf Kleven
100	1935-10-03	Olympic Stadium, Amsterdam (A)	Netherlands	0–3	F	
101	1936-06-14	Idrætsparken, Copenhagen (H)	Sweden	4–3	NC	Helmuth Søbirk, own goal (Svend Andersson), Pauli Jørgensen, Eigil Thielsen
102	1936-06-30	Tölö bollplan, Helsinki (A)	Finland	4–1	NC	Pauli Jørgensen (2), Eyolf Kleven, Kaj Hansen
103	1936-09-20	Ullevaal Stadion, Oslo (A)	Norway	3–3	NC	Helmuth Søbirk (2), Pauli Jørgensen
104	1936-10-04	Idrætsparken, Copenhagen (H)	Poland	2–1	F	Carl Stoltz (2)
105	1937-05-16	Hermann Göring Stadium, Breslau (A)	Germany	0–8	F	
106	1937-06-13	Idrætsparken, Copenhagen (H)	Norway	5–1	NC	Eyolf Kleven, Helmuth Søbirk (2), Kaj Hansen, Peder Rasmussen
107	1937-09-12	Piłsudski Stadium, Warsaw (A)	Poland	1–3	F	Jørgen Iversen
108	1937-10-03	Råsunda Stadium, Stockholm (A)	Sweden	2–1	NC	Knud H.M. Andersen, Helmuth Søbirk
109	1937-10-17	Idrætsparken, Copenhagen (H)	Finland	2–1	NC	Knud H.M. Andersen, Alex Friedmann
110	1938-06-21	Idrætsparken, Copenhagen (H)	Sweden	0–1	NC	
111	1938-08-31	Pallokenttä, Helsinki (A)	Finland	1–2	NC	Arne Sørensen
112	1938-09-18	Ullevaal Stadion, Oslo (A)	Norway	1–1	NC	Kaj Hansen
113	1938-10-23	Idrætsparken, Copenhagen (H)	Netherlands	2–2	F	Kai Uldaler, Reinholdt Christensen
114	1939-06-15	Idrætsparken, Copenhagen (H)	Finland	5–0	OT	Eigil Thielsen, Kaj Hansen (2), Helmuth Søbirk (2)
115	1939-06-18	Idrætsparken, Copenhagen (H)	Norway	6–3	OT	Pauli Jørgensen (3), Eigil Thielsen, Arne Sørensen, Walther Christensen
116	1939-06-25	Idrætsparken, Copenhagen (H)	Germany	0–2	F	
117	1939-09-17	Idrætsparken, Copenhagen (H)	Finland	8–1	NC	Arno Nielsen, Oskar Theisen (3), own goal (R. Lindbäck), Pauli Jørgensen, Svend Albrechtsen, Helmuth Søbirk
118	1939-10-01	Råsunda Stadium, Stockholm (A)	Sweden	1–4	NC	Pauli Jørgensen
119	1939-10-22	Idrætsparken, Copenhagen (H)	Norway	4–1	NC	Svend Albrechtsen, Alex Friedmann, Pauli Jørgensen (2)

== 1940s ==
#	Date	Venue	Opponents	Score	Comp	Denmark scorers
120	1940-10-06	Råsunda Stadium, Stockholm (A)	Sweden	1–1	F	Børge Mathiesen
121	1940-10-20	Idrætsparken, Copenhagen (H)	Sweden	3–3	F	Kaj Hansen (3)
122	1940-11-17	Victoria-Stadion Hoheluft, Hamburg (A)	Germany	0–1	F	
123	1941-09-14	Råsunda Stadium, Stockholm (A)	Sweden	2–2	F	Johannes Pløger, Kaj Hansen
124	1941-10-19	Idrætsparken, Copenhagen (H)	Sweden	2–1	F	Johannes Pløger, Kaj Hansen
125	1941-11-16	Sportclub Stadion, Dresden (A)	Germany	1–1	F	Kaj Hansen
126	1942-06-28	Idrætsparken, Copenhagen (H)	Sweden	0–3	F	
127	1942-10-04	Råsunda Stadium, Stockholm (A)	Sweden	1–2	F	Arne Sørensen
128	1943-06-20	Idrætsparken, Copenhagen (H)	Sweden	3–2	F	Kaj Christiansen (2), Johannes Pløger
129	1945-06-24	Råsunda Stadium, Stockholm (A)	Sweden	1–2	F	Helmuth Søbirk
130	1945-06-01	Idrætsparken, Copenhagen (H)	Sweden	3–4	F	Karl Aage Hansen (2), Kaj Hansen
131	1945-08-26	Idrætsparken, Copenhagen (H)	Sweden	4–2	F	Kaj Christiansen (2), Karl Aage Hansen, Aage Rou Jensen
132	1945-09-09	Ullevaal Stadion, Oslo (A)	Norway	5–1	F	Helge Bronée, Hans Viggo Jensen, Karl Aage Hansen (2), Carl Aage Præst
133	1945-09-30	Råsunda Stadium, Stockholm (A)	Sweden	1–4	F	Gustaf Pålsson
134	1946-06-16	Ullevaal Stadion, Oslo (A)	Norway	1–2	F	Jørgen Leschly Sørensen
135	1946-06-23	Idrætsparken, Copenhagen (H)	Sweden	3–1	F	Johannes Pløger, Jørgen Leschly Sørensen, Carl Aage Præst
136	1946-07-08	Idrætsparken, Copenhagen (H)	Norway	2–0	F	Carl Aage Præst, Arne Sørensen
137	1946-07-17	Reykjavík Stadion, Reykjavík (A)	Iceland	3–0	F	Karl Aage Hansen, Kaj Christiansen, Jørgen Leschly Sørensen
138	1946-09-01	Helsinki Olympic Stadium, Helsinki (A)	Finland	5–2	F	Ivan Jensen, Johannes Pløger, Erling Sørensen (2), Carl Aage Præst
139	1946-10-06	Gamla Ullevi, Gothenburg (A)	Sweden	3–3	F	Carl Aage Præst, Jørgen Leschly Sørensen, Karl Aage Hansen
140	1946-10-20	Idrætsparken, Copenhagen (H)	Norway	7–1	F	Karl Aage Hansen (4), Jørgen Leschly Sørensen, Carl Aage Præst (2)
141	1947-06-15	Idrætsparken, Copenhagen (H)	Sweden	1–4	NC	Karl Aage Hansen
142	1947-06-20	Idrætsparken, Copenhagen (H)	Czechoslovakia	2–2	F	Carl Aage Præst, Karl Aage Hansen
143	1947-06-26	Råsunda Stadium, Stockholm (A)	Sweden	1–6	OT	Jørgen Leschly Sørensen
144	1947-09-21	Ullevaal Stadion, Oslo (A)	Norway	5–3	NC	own goal (Gunnar Hansen), Jørgen W. Hansen (2), Carl Aage Præst (2)
145	1947-10-05	Aarhus Stadion, Aarhus (H)	Finland	4–1	NC	Jørgen W. Hansen, Carl Aage Præst (2), Jørgen Leschly Sørensen
146	1948-06-12	Idrætsparken, Copenhagen (H)	Norway	1–2	NC	Ivan Jensen
147	1948-06-15	Helsinki Olympic Stadium, Helsinki (A)	Finland	3–0	NC	John Hansen, Kaj Christiansen, Harald Lyngsaa
148	1948-06-26	Idrætsparken, Copenhagen (H)	Poland	8–0	F	Karl Aage Hansen (2), Carl Aage Præst (3), John Hansen (2), Johannes Pløger
149	1948-07-31	Selhurst Park, London (N)	Egypt	3–1 (aet)	OG	Karl Aage Hansen (2), Johannes Pløger
150	1948-08-05	Highbury, London (N)	Italy	5–3	OG	John Hansen (4), Johannes Pløger
151	1948-08-10	Wembley Stadium, London (N)	Sweden	2–4	OG	Holger Seebach, John Hansen
152	1948-08-13	Wembley Stadium, London (A)	Great Britain	5–3	OG	Carl Aage Præst (2), John Hansen (2), Jørgen Leschly Sørensen
153	1948-09-26	Idrætsparken, Copenhagen (H)	England	0–0	F	
154	1948-10-10	Råsunda Stadium, Stockholm (A)	Sweden	0–1	NC	
155	1949-06-12	Idrætsparken, Copenhagen (H)	Netherlands	1–2	F	Svend Jørgen Hansen
156	1949-06-19	Stadion Wojska Polskiego, Warsaw (A)	Poland	2–1	OT	Frank Reckendorff, Knud Lundberg
157	1949-08-07	Aarhus Stadion, Aarhus (H)	Iceland	5–1	F	Knud Lundberg, Jens Peter Hansen (2), Kaj Frandsen, Frank Reckendorff
158	1949-09-11	Idrætsparken, Copenhagen (H)	Finland	0–2	NC	
159	1949-09-11	Ullevaal Stadion, Oslo (A)	Norway	2–0	NC	Frank Reckendorff, Jens Peter Hansen
160	1949-10-23	Idrætsparken, Copenhagen (H)	Sweden	3–2	NC	Claes Petersen, Jørgen W. Hansen, Edwin Hansen
161	1949-12-11	Olympic Stadion, Amsterdam (A)	Netherlands	1–0	F	Harald Lyngsaa
