= 1929 in Norwegian football =

Football in Norway
Men's football
- NM: Sarpsborg

Results from Norwegian football in 1929.

== Østlandsligaen 1928/29 (Unofficial) ==
=== Hovedserien ===
| Pos | Team | Pld | W | D | L | GF | GA | GD | Pts | Relegation |
|---|---|---|---|---|---|---|---|---|---|---|
| 1 | Lisleby | 14 | 11 | 0 | 3 | 44 | 24 | +20 | 22 | |
| 2 | Odd | 14 | 10 | 0 | 4 | 42 | 24 | +18 | 20 | |
| 3 | Mjøndalen | 14 | 8 | 3 | 3 | 40 | 17 | +23 | 19 | |
| 4 | Frigg | 14 | 8 | 2 | 4 | 38 | 30 | +8 | 18 | |
| 5 | Kvik (Halden) | 14 | 7 | 3 | 4 | 36 | 26 | +10 | 17 | |
| 6 | Fredrikstad | 14 | 7 | 2 | 5 | 31 | 25 | +6 | 16 | |
| 7 | Sarpsborg | 14 | 7 | 1 | 6 | 26 | 24 | +2 | 15 | |
| 8 | Ørn | 14 | 6 | 2 | 6 | 32 | 25 | +7 | 14 | |
| 9 | Drammens BK | 14 | 5 | 3 | 6 | 25 | 28 | −3 | 13 | |
| 10 | Urædd | 14 | 4 | 4 | 6 | 31 | 33 | −2 | 12 | |
| 11 | Strømsgodset | 14 | 6 | 0 | 8 | 35 | 39 | −4 | 12 | Relegated |
| 12 | Moss | 14 | 4 | 4 | 6 | 33 | 37 | −4 | 12 | Relegated |
| 13 | Larvik Turn | 14 | 4 | 1 | 9 | 23 | 41 | −18 | 9 | Relegated |
| 14 | Lyn | 14 | 3 | 1 | 10 | 21 | 53 | −32 | 7 | Relegated |
| 15 | Drafn | 14 | 2 | 0 | 12 | 24 | 55 | −31 | 4 | Relegated |

Source: rsssf.no

Promoted: Fram (Larvik), Selbak, Storm, Strong and Strømsgodset.

Best placed club from each of the five local association leagues 1929 promoted.

== Class A of local association leagues ==
Class A of local association leagues (kretsserier) is the predecessor of a national league competition.

| League | Champion |
|---|---|
| Østfold | Selbak |
| Oslo | Strong |
| Follo | Ski |
| Aker | Nydalen |
| Lillestrøm og omegn | Lillestrøm |
| Øvre Romerike | Haga |
| Oplandene | Lyn (Gjøvik) |
| Glommendalen | Grue |
| Nord-Østerdal | Bergmann |
| Trysil og Engerdal | Nybergsund |
| Røyken og Hurum | Roy |
| Øvre Buskerud | Vikersund champion |
| Drammen og omegn | Mjøndalen |
| Vestfold | Fram (Larvik) |
| Grenland | Odd |
| Øvre Telemark | Rjukan |
| Aust-Agder | Kragerø |
| Vest-Agder | Start |
| Rogaland | Viking |
| Hordaland | Voss |
| Bergen | Brann |
| Sogn og Fjordane | Høyanger |
| Søndmøre^{1} | Aalesund |
| Romsdalske^{2} | Kristiansund |
| Sør-Trøndelag | Ranheim |
| Trondhjem | Kvik (Trondhjem) |
| Nord-Trøndelag | Neset |
| Namdal | Namsos |
| Helgeland | Bossmo/Ytteren |
| Lofoten og Vesterålen | Bodø/Glimt |
| Troms | Harstad |
| Finnmark | Kirkenes |

- ^{1}In the following season, Søndmøre local association changed name to Sunnmøre.
- ^{2}In the following season, Romsdalske local association changed name to Nordmøre og Romsdal.

== Norwegian Cup ==
=== Final ===
20 October 1929

| Sarpsborg | 2–1 (a.e.t.) | Ørn |
|---|---|---|
| Yven 42'; Gundersen 103' | Report | Dahl 75' |

Stavanger Stadion, Stavanger
Attendance: 13,000
Referee: Thoralf Kristiansen (Gjøa)

== Northern Norwegian Cup ==
=== Final ===
| Narvik/Nor | 4–1 | Harstad |
|---|---|---|
| | Report |

== National team ==
| 12 June 1929 Friendly | Norway | 4–4 | Netherlands | Oslo, Norway |
| 19:30 (UTC+1); Match 76 | Juve 39', 44', 53'; Andersen 81' | Report | Kools 10', 89'; Tap 16'; Landaal 27' | Stadium: Ullevaal Stadion; Attendance: 14,000; Referee: Lauritz Andersen (Denmark) |

| 18 June 1929 1929–32 Nordic Championship | Norway | 4–0 | Finland | Oslo, Norway |
| 19:30 (UTC+1); Match 77 | Juve 8', 15', 73'; Er. Andersen 30' | Report | | Stadium: Ullevaal Stadion; Attendance: 12,000; Referee: Carl Olsson (Sweden) |

| 23 June 1929 1929–32 Nordic Championship | Denmark | 2–5 | Norway | Copenhagen, Denmark |
| 13:30 (UTC+1); Match 78 | Jørgensen 32'; Christophersen 82' (pen.) | Report | Juve 41', 60'; Berg-Johannesen 69'; Er. Andersen 72', 77' | Stadium: Københavns Idrætspark; Attendance: 20,000; Referee: Alfred Birlem (Germany) |

| 29 September 1929 1929–32 Nordic Championship | Norway | 2–1 | Sweden | Oslo, Norway |
| 13:00 (UTC+1); Match 79 | Juve 21'; O. Gundersen 66' | Report | Kroon 33' | Stadium: Ullevaal Stadion; Attendance: 24,200; Referee: Lauritz Andersen (Denmark) |

| 3 November 1929 Friendly | Netherlands | 1–4 | Norway | Amsterdam, Netherlands |
| 14:00 (UTC+00:20); Match 80 | van den Broek 19' | Report | Juve 9', 22'; Berg-Johannesen 39', 70' | Stadium: Olympic Stadium; Attendance: 19,000; Referee: Henri Cristophe (Belgium) |
