= 1932 Norwegian Football Cup =

Norgesmesterskapet i fotball for menn 1932

Tournament details
- Country: Norway
- Teams: 151 (overall); 46 (qualifying competition); 128 (main competition)

Final positions
- Champions: Fredrikstad (1st title)
- Runners-up: Ørn

The 1932 Norwegian Football Cup was the 31st season of the Norwegian annual knockout football tournament. The tournament was open for all members of NFF, except those from Northern Norway. The final was played at Marienlyst Stadion in Drammen on 16 October 1932, and was contested by four-time former winners Ørn, and Fredrikstad who played their first final. Fredrikstad won the final 6–1, and secured their first title. Odd were the defending champions, but were eliminated by Torp in the fourth round.

== Rounds and dates ==
- Qualifying round: 31 July
- First round: 7 August
- Second round: 14 August
- Third round: 28 August
- Fourth round: 4 September
- Quarter-finals: 18 September
- Semi-finals: 2 October
- Final: 16 October

== Qualifying round ==
Team 1	Score	Team 2
Askim	3–0	Homansbyen
Bergmann	2–4	Tynset
Blink	5–1	Aasguten
Borg	3–0	Vinn
Drøbak	1–3	Gleng
Eydehavn	4–0	Spring (Kragerø)
Fremad Filtvet	3–5 (Note: For unknown reasons, both teams advanced to the first round.)	B.14
Grue	1–0	Frogg
Gråbein	0–3	Fagerborg
Haga	2–1	Eidsvold Turn
Harran	0–2	Bangsund
Hølen	2–4	Fredensborg
Lilleaker	7–0	Spikkestad
Magnor	5–7 (a.e.t.)	Kampørn
Molde	0–2	Langevåg
Namsos	5–0	Grong
Nordstrand	2–2 (a.e.t.)	Speed
Ready	3–4	Heming
Stord	0–2	Jarl
Strinda	4–5	National
Ullensaker	6–1	Lierfoss
Vard	3–1	Djerv 1919
Årstad	1–0	Ulabrand
Replay
Speed	4–1	Nordstrand

== First round ==
Team 1	Score	Team 2
Aalesund	7–2	Langevåg
Askim	0–1	Kvik (Halden)
Bangsund	0–7	Kvik (Trondheim)
Berger	3–1	Strong
Brage	4–1	Orkanger
Brann	13–0	Minde
Djerv	6–0	Årstad
Drammens BK	3–3 (a.e.t.)	Vardal
Eidsvold IF	0–3	Drafn
Eiker	2–2 (a.e.t.)	Birkebeineren
Flekkefjord	3–1	Egersund
Fram (Larvik)	3–0	Kampørn
Freidig	2–3	Braatt
Fremad Lillehammer	3–2	Trygg (Oslo)
Frigg	8–3	Fossekallen
Geithus	1–3	Gjøa
Grane (Arendal)	2–1	Start
Grane (Sandvika)	0–2	Dæhlenengen
Grue	0–9	Lyn
Hamar	8–0	Elverum
Hardy	12–0	Ny–Solheim
Holmestrand	2–3	Skiens-Grane
Jevnaker	8–0	Briskebyen
Kapp	3–1	Bøn
Kongsberg	1–5	Larvik Turn
Kongsvinger	6–4	Ullensaker
Kristiansund	2–0	Rosenborg
Lilleaker	1–0	Strømsgodset
Lillestrøm	5–0	Sander
Lisleby	5–1	Fredensborg
Liv	1–2	Tønsberg Turn
Lyn (Gjøvik)	5–1	Speed
Mandalskameratene	0–3	Donn
Mjøndalen	2–0	B.14
Moss	8–1	Roy (Hurum)
Neset	4–2	Rapp
Pors	5–1	Fagerborg
Ranheim	8–1	Blink
Rjukan	5–2	Vestfossen
Rollon	5–2	Clausenengen
Sandefjord BK	1–4	Urædd
Sarpsborg	9–0	Haga
Skeid	7–0	Norrøna (Strømmen)
Ski	1–5	Fredrikstad
Skiens BK	8–1	Eydehavn
Skiold	5–0	Fremad Filtvet
Snøgg	7–2	Vikersund
Stabæk	2–4	Falk
Stavanger	3–1	Jarl
Steinkjer	1–5	National
Storm	6–0	Kragerø
Strømmen BK	1–3	Nydalen
Sverre	1–0 (a.e.t.)	Namsos
Sørumsand	0–2	Selbak
Tistedalen	2–3	Gleng
Torp	7–2	Hasle
Tynset	0–7	Raufoss
Tønsberg-Kameratene	0–1	Borg
Ulf	5–3	Brodd
Vålerengen	8–3	Heming
Vigør	1–4	Odd
Viking	16–2	Vard
Voss	4–3	Høyanger
Ørn	7–1	Bygdø BK
Replay
Birkebeineren	2–0	Eiker
Vardal	2–3	Drammens BK

== Second round ==
Team 1	Score	Team 2
Birkebeineren	2–2 (a.e.t.)	Berger
Borg	0–1	Storm
Braatt	1–2	Aalesund
Brage	4–1	Sverre
Brann	9–0	Jevnaker
Donn	2–0	Viking
Drafn	7–0	Lilleaker
Drammens BK	4–0	Hamar
Dæhlenengen	1–4	Sarpsborg
Falk	2–3	Torp
Fredrikstad	5–1	Skiens BK
Fremad Lillehammer	1–5	Lisleby
Gjøa	2–0	Skiold
Gleng	2–7	Vålerengen
Grane (Arendal)	2–5	Fram (Larvik)
Kvik (Halden)	3–2	Frigg
Kvik (Trondheim)	6–0	National
Larvik Turn	5–1	Skeid
Lyn	5–2	Pors
Moss	3–2	Kapp
Nydalen	0–4	Lyn (Gjøvik)
Odd	3–2	Rjukan
Ranheim	4–2	Neset
Raufoss	0–5	Mjøndalen
Rollon	3–4	Kristiansund
Selbak	7–1	Kongsvinger
Skiens-Grane	0–1	Ørn
Stavanger	4–1	Flekkefjord
Tønsberg Turn	2–2 (a.e.t.)	Snøgg
Ulf	2–3	Djerv
Urædd	3–1	Lillestrøm
Voss	0–4	Hardy
Replay
Berger	3–1	Birkebeineren
Snøgg	1–4	Tønsberg Turn

== Third round ==
Team 1	Score	Team 2
Djerv	1–3	Lyn
Fram (Larvik)	2–1	Donn
Hardy	2–1	Stavanger
Kristiansund	0–3	Drammens BK
Kvik (Halden)	3–1	Brann
Kvik (Trondheim)	0–1	Moss
Lisleby	3–0	Berger
Lyn (Gjøvik)	0–3	Fredrikstad
Mjøndalen	8–2	Ranheim
Sarpsborg	2–2 (a.e.t.)	Brage
Storm	1–0	Gjøa
Torp	7–0	Urædd
Tønsberg Turn	0–5 (Note: Played in Sandefjord.)	Odd
Vålerengen	6–4	Drafn
Ørn	1–0	Selbak
Aalesund	5–2	Larvik Turn
Replay
Brage	1–2	Sarpsborg

== Fourth round ==
Team 1	Score	Team 2
Drammens BK	2–0	Fram (Larvik)
Fredrikstad	9–1	Aalesund
Hardy	0–1	Lisleby
Lyn	0–1	Ørn
Moss	1–2	Mjøndalen
Odd	0–1	Torp
Sarpsborg	2–1	Vålerengen
Storm	1–2 (Note: Played in Larvik.)	Kvik (Halden)

== Quarter-finals ==
Team 1	Score	Team 2
Kvik (Halden)	1–2 (a.e.t.) (Note: Played at Ullevaal Stadion in Oslo)	Ørn
Lisleby	2–1 (a.e.t.)	Drammens BK
Mjøndalen	3–2	Sarpsborg
Torp	0–2 (Note: Played in Sarpsborg.)	Fredrikstad

== Semi-finals ==
Team 1	Score	Team 2
Fredrikstad	3–0	Mjøndalen
Ørn	3–1 (Note: Played in Larvik.)	Lisleby

== Final ==
16 October 1932

Fredrikstad	6–1	Ørn
Børresen 8'; Sv. Moe 15', 24', 48', 82'; F. Johannesen 65'	Report	Thorstensen 10'

Marienlyst Stadion, Drammen
Attendance: 17,000
Referee: Oscar Arvid Carlsen (Lillestrøm)

== See also ==
- 1932 in Norwegian football
