= 1930 Norwegian Football Cup =

Norgesmesterskapet i fotball for menn 1930

Tournament details
- Country: Norway
- Teams: 128

Final positions
- Champions: Ørn (4th title)
- Runners-up: Drammens BK

The 1930 Norwegian Football Cup was the 29th season of the Norwegian annual knockout football tournament. The tournament was open for all members of NFF, except those from Northern Norway. The final was played at Brann Stadion in Bergen on 19 October 1930, and was contested by the last year's losing finalist Ørn and Drammens BK, who played their first and only final. Ørn, who played in their fifth consecutive final, won the final 4–2, and secured their third title in five years, and fourth title in total.

== Rounds and dates ==
- First round: 10 August
- Second round: 17 August
- Third round: 31 August
- Fourth round: 14 September
- Quarter-finals: 28 September
- Semi-finals: 5 October
- Final: 19 October

== First round ==
Team 1	Score	Team 2
Blink	0–10	Kvik (Nidaros)
Brage	6–1	Braatt
Brann	8–0	Voss
Djerv	5–0	Ny-Solheim
Donn	1–2 (a.e.t.)	Vigør
Drammens BK	7–1	Fossekallen
Eidsvold IF	3–1	Raufoss
Eiker	3–2 (a.e.t.)	Rjukan
Eydehavn	0–3	Start
Flekkefjord	6–0	Mandalskameratene
Fram (Larvik)	4–0	Ulefoss
Fremad Lillehammer	1–5	Vardal
Geithus	0–2	Larvik Turn
Lyn (Gjøvik)	12–0	Ullensaker
Grane (Sandvika)	0–3	Tønsberg Turn
Grue	1–0	Nybergsund
Gråbein	2–3	Drafn
Haga	2–5	Bøn
Hamar	7–1	Bergmann
Hasle	0–5	Vålerengen
Holmestrand	4–1	Fremad Filtvet
Hølen	0–8	Kvik (Halden)
Høyanger	1–3	Hardy
Jevnaker	2–3	Strømsgodset
Kapp	3–2	Eidsvold Turn
Kongsberg	0–1	Urædd
Kongsvinger	1–0	Hof
Kristiansund	1–4	Aalesund
Kråkstad	1–8	Selbak
Lillestrøm	3–0	Fram Brumunddal
Lisleby	11–0	Nordstrand
Liv	3–0	Lyn
Minde	5–1	Ulabrand
Mjøndalen	5–1	Berger
Moss	7–1	Drøbak
Namsos	7–1	Harran
Neset	1–1 (a.e.t.)	Sverre
Norrøna Strømmen	1–12	Fredrikstad
Orkanger	4–3	Freidig
Pors	4–1	Grane (Arendal)
Ranheim	6–0	National
Rapp	5–4	Strinda
Rollon	7–0	Molde
Roy (Hurum)	0–3	Falk
Sandefjord	2–8	Gjøa
Sarpsborg	8–0	Lierfoss
Skade	1–3	Odd
Skeid	4–0	Lillestrømkameratene
Ski	4–1	Nydalen
Skiens BK	4–0	Kragerø
Skiold	5–0	Bygdø BK
Skotfoss	2–1	Snøgg
Stabæk	2–3	Trygg
Stavanger	2–1	Brodd
Steinkjer	8–1	Bangsund
Stord	3–3 (a.e.t.)	Årstad
Strømmen BK	2–6	Frigg
Tell (Notodden)	1–5	Storm
Tistedalen	2–2 (a.e.t.)	Dæhlenengen
Torp	4–1	Strong
Tønsberg-Kameratene	4–1	Vikersund
Ulf	5–3 (a.e.t.)	Egersund
Vard	1–2	Viking
Ørn	4–0	Birkebeineren
Replay
Dæhlenengen	3–0	Tistedalen
Sverre	1–2 (a.e.t.)	Neset
Årstad	2–4 (a.e.t.)	Stord

== Second round ==
Team 1	Score	Team 2
Bøn	1–2	Lyn (Gjøvik)
Djerv	3–1	Minde
Drafn	4–3	Brann
Dæhlenengen	2–6	Drammens BK
Eidsvold IF	0–7	Lisleby
Eiker	2–2 (a.e.t.)	Fram (Larvik)
Falk	3–1 (a.e.t.)	Skiens BK
Flekkefjord	2–4	Ulf
Fredrikstad	8–2	Skiold
Frigg	6–4	Rollon
Gjøa	1–3	Kapp
Hamar	4–2	Grue
Hardy	4–1	Årstad
Kongsvinger	0–5	Lillestrøm
Kvik (Halden)	9–0	Vålerengen
Kvik (Nidaros)	5–0	Neset
Larvik Turn	6–2	Skotfoss
Liv	1–9	Mjøndalen
Moss	2–1	Pors
Odd	7–0	Tønsberg-Kameratene
Orkanger	1–5	Brage
Ranheim	4–2	Rapp
Selbak	8–0	Ski
Start	1–3	Stavanger
Steinkjer	5–1	Nasos
Storm	0–1	Ørn
Strømsgodset	6–1	Torp
Tønsberg Turn	4–1	Sarpsborg
Urædd	6–0	Holmestrand
Vardal	1–2 (a.e.t.)	Trygg
Viking	4–2	Vigør
Aalesund	7–0	Skeid
Replay
Fram (Larvik)	6–2	Eiker

== Third round ==
Team 1	Score	Team 2
Aalesund	6–3	Selbak
Brage	3–0	Ranheim
Stavanger	4–0	Djerv
Hardy	5–4 (a.e.t.)	Drafn
Drammens BK	4–4 (a.e.t.)	Larvik Turn
Lillestrøm	2–1	Falk
Fram (Larvik)	3–2	Kvik (Halden)
Kapp	0–8	Fredrikstad
Lyn (Gjøvik)	2–4	Frigg
Mjøndalen	9–0	Hamar
Steinkjer	3–6	Kvik (Nidaros)
Lisleby	6–1	Strømsgodset
Ørn	7–1	Moss
Trygg	2–2 (Note: Trygg – Odd was abandoned.)	Odd
Urædd	2–0	Tønsberg Turn
Ulf	2–5	Viking
Replay
Larvik Turn	0–3	Drammens BK
Trygg	1–2	Odd

== Fourth round ==
Team 1	Score	Team 2
Ørn	6–2	Aalesund
Frigg	10–2	Brage
Urædd	2–5	Drammens BK
Fredrikstad	2–0	Fram (Larvik)
Viking	2–0	Hardy
Kvik (Nidaros)	1–7	Lisleby
Odd	8–3	Lillestrøm
Stavanger IF	3–0	Mjøndalen

== Quarter-finals ==
Team 1	Score	Team 2
Lisleby	2–3	Drammens BK
Odd	2–3	Fredrikstad
Stavanger IF	5–4 (a.e.t.)	Frigg
Ørn	0–0 (a.e.t.)	Viking
Replay
Ørn	4–0	Viking

== Semi-finals ==
Team 1	Score	Team 2
Drammens BK	2–0	Stavanger IF
Ørn	2–1	Fredrikstad

== Final ==
19 October 1930

Ørn	4–2	Drammens BK
Fredriksen 16'; Nielsen or Olsen 52'; Dahl 72', 85'	Report	Trogstad 15', 83'

Brann Stadion, Bergen
Attendance: 6,000
Referee: Reidar Randers-Johansen (Trygg)

== See also ==
- 1930 in Norwegian football
