= Nordic Football Championship =

- Founded: 1924
- Abolished: 2001
- Region: Europe (UEFA)
- Teams: 6 (2000–01)
- Last champions: Finland (1st title)
- Most championships: Sweden (9 titles)

The Nordic Football Championship (Danish: Nordisk Mesterskab, Norwegian: Nordisk Mesterskap, Swedish: Nordiska Mästerskapet, Finnish: Pohjoismaiden-mestaruusturnaus, commonly abbreviated NM or PM) was an international football competition contested by the men's national football teams of the Nordic countries. In the first tournament played 1924–1928, only Denmark, Norway and Sweden competed, but Finland joined for the second tournament, and at the last tournament played in 2000–2001, Iceland and the Faroe Islands also competed.

== History ==
The tournament was created on Danish initiative to replace a contract, ended in 1919, between the Danish (DBU), Norwegian (NFF) and Swedish Football Association (SvFF) that stated that the national teams of the three associations should play two annual matches against each other. However, the idea was not realised until four years later, when the Danish association celebrated its 35th anniversary, and the first tournament was started. It was arranged by the DBU and was played as a single group where the three teams met each other five times for a total of ten matches each. DBU also provided the trophy of the first edition, a trophy that Denmark won when the tournament ended in 1928.

The second tournament was arranged by SvFF which celebrated its 25th anniversary, and this time the Football Association of Finland (SPF) was invited. It was also decided to play the tournaments over four years, with each team playing 12 matches, four against each other team, two at home and two away. The tournament was won by Norway, but the following nine tournaments, played between 1933 and 1977, were completely dominated by Sweden which won all of them. The fourth tournament was interrupted by the Second World War, and thus was played over eleven years, from 1937 to 1947.

The tournament gained popularity after the war and the matches were important for the Nordic national teams as preparation for larger tournaments such as the World Cup and the Olympics. But the tournament lost significance in the 1970s, partially due to the increased number of matches played against other international opponents, and thus the last three tournaments played in the 1970s and 1980s varied in length and format. The last match of the 1981-1983 tournament, between Sweden and Norway, was not even played as Denmark had already won. But the match was then played in 1985 after all.

A non-recurrent edition of the tournament was played in 2000–01, to which the Football Association of Iceland and the Faroe Islands Football Association were invited. Some of the matches were played during a joint training camp in La Manga Club, Spain, and the rest were played at home, some in indoor arenas. One match, between Norway and the Faroe Islands, was never played. The tournament was won by Finland for the first time.

== Results ==
Year	Trophy	Winner	Runner-up	3rd Place	4th Place
1924–28; Details	Jubilæumspokal	Denmark	Sweden	Norway	Only three participants
1929–32; Details	Guldkrus	Norway	Sweden	Denmark	Finland
1933–36; Details	Nordiske Pokal	Sweden	Denmark	Norway	Finland
1937–47; Details	Suomen Karhut	Sweden (2)	Denmark	Norway	Finland
1948–51; Details	DBU's Vase	Sweden (3)	Denmark	Norway	Finland
1952–55; Details	SvFF:s pokal	Sweden (4)	Norway	Denmark	Finland
1956–59; Details	Eventyr og Lek	Sweden (5)	Norway	Denmark	Finland
1960–63; Details	SPL's Pokal	Sweden (6)	Denmark	Norway	Finland
1964–67; Details	Fodboldspillere	Sweden (7)	Denmark	Finland	Norway
1968–71; Details	SvFF:s pokal	Sweden (8)	Denmark	Norway	Finland
1972–77; Details	—	Sweden (9)	Denmark	Norway	Finland
1978–80; Details	—	Denmark (2)	Sweden	Norway	Finland
1981–85; Details	—	Denmark (3)	Sweden	Norway	Finland
2000–01; Details	—	Finland	Iceland	Denmark	Norway

== Medals ==
Rank	Nation	Gold	Silver	Bronze	Total
1	Sweden	9	4	0	13
2	Denmark	3	7	4	14
3	Norway	1	2	9	12
4	Finland	1	0	1	2
5	Iceland	0	1	0	1
Totals (5 entries)		14	14	14	42

== Summary ==
Source: https://www.rsssf.org/tablesn/nordic.html

Rank	Team	Part	M	W	D	L	GF	GA	GD	Points
1	Sweden	14	147	89	26	32	382	198	+184	293
2	Denmark	14	147	75	23	49	323	218	+105	248
3	Norway	14	145	52	31	62	265	300	–35	187
4	Finland	13	137	21	24	92	150	401	–251	66
5	Iceland	1	5	3	1	1	7	5	+2	10
6	Faroe Islands	1	4	0	1	3	2	6	–4	1

== Top scorers per tournament ==
Tournament	Name	Team	Goals
1924–1928	(Sweden) Sven Rydell	Sweden	15
1929–1932	(Norway) Jørgen Juve	Norway	17
1933–1936	(Denmark) Pauli Jørgensen	Denmark	8
1933–1936	(Sweden) Bertil Ericsson	Sweden	8
1937–1947	(Sweden) Gunnar Nordahl	Sweden	7
1948–1951	(Sweden) Egon Jönsson	Sweden	7
1952–1955	(Sweden) Nils-Åke Sandell	Sweden	10
1956–1959	(Sweden) Agne Simonsson	Sweden	7
1960–1963	(Denmark) Ole Madsen	Denmark	11
1964–67	(Denmark) Erik Dyreborg	Denmark	5
1964–67	(Denmark) Ole Madsen (2)	Denmark	5
1964–67	(Sweden) Tom Turesson	Sweden	5
1968–71	(Norway) Odd Iversen	Norway	6
1972–77	(Sweden) Conny Torstensson	Sweden	4
1978–80	(Norway) Pål Jacobsen	Norway	4
1981–85	Seven different players	Various	2
2000–01	(Iceland) Ríkharður Daðason	Iceland	4

== All-time top scorers ==
	Player	Team	Goals	Tournaments
1	Pauli Jørgensen	Denmark	30	(1924-28(3), 1929-32(15), 1933-36(8) and 1937-47(4))
2	Jørgen Juve	Norway	20	(1929-32(17) and 1933-36(3))
3	Ole Madsen	Denmark	18	(1956-59(2), 1960-63(11) and 1964-67(5))
4	Sven Rydell	Sweden	17	(1924-28(15) and 1929-32(2))
5	Harald Hennum	Norway	14	(1948-51(1), 1952-55(5), 1956-59(6), 1960-63(2))
6	Gunnar Nordahl	Sweden	12	(1937-47(7) and 1948-51(5))
6	Rune Börjesson	Sweden	12	(1956-59(6) and 1960-63(6))
8	Erik Persson	Sweden	11	(1933-36(5) and 1937-47(6))
8	Nils-Åke Sandell	Sweden	11	(1952-55(10) and 1956-59(1))
10	Agne Simonsson	Sweden	10	(1956-59(7), 1960-63(1) and 1964-67(2))
11	Jens Peder Hansen	Denmark	9	(1948-51(2), 1952-55(5), 1956-59(2))
11	Kaj Uldaler	Denmark	9	(1929-32(5) and 1933-36(4))
11	Gunnar Thoresen	Norway	9	(1937-47(1), 1948-51(3), 1952-55(4) and 1956-59(1))
14	Finn Berstad	Norway	8	(1924-28(8))
14	Bertil Ericsson	Sweden	8	(1933-36(8))
14	Michael Rohde	Denmark	8	(1924-28(7) and 1929-32(1))
14	Gunnar Gren	Sweden	8	(1937-47(2) and 1956-59(6))
14	Henning Enoksen	Denmark	8	(1956-59(3) and 1960-63(5))
14	Knut Kroon	Sweden	8	(1924-28(2), 1929-32(5), 1933-36(1))
14	Harry Bild	Sweden	8	(1956-59(3), 1960-63(3) and 1964-67(2))
14	Odd Iversen	Norway	8	(1964-67(1), 1968-71(6), 1972-77(1))

== Hat-tricks ==
Since the first official tournament in 1924–28, 41 hat-tricks have been scored in over 100 matches of the 14 editions of the tournament. The first hat-trick was scored by Sven Rydell of Sweden, playing against Norway on 21 September 1924; and the last was by Pål Jacobsen of Norway, playing against Finland on 21 August 1980. The record number of hat-tricks in a single Nordic Football Championship is ten, during the 1929-32 edition. The only player to have scored four hat-tricks is Jørgen Juve, three in 1929-32 (in which he was the top goal scorer with 17 goals) and one in 1933–36. He is closely followed by Sven Rydell who has three (all of whom came in the inaugural edition of the competition), and the next closest are Pauli Jørgensen, Erik Persson and Gunnar Nordahl with two hat-tricks each. The record for the most goals scored in a single Nordic Championship game is 5, which has been achieved on two occasion: by Gunnar Nordahl when he scored 5 for Sweden in a 5–3 win over Norway and by Erik Dyreborg when he scored his side's 5 goals in a 5–0 win over Norway. Sweden holds the record for most hat-tricks scored with 23, which is more than half of all hat-tricks. Finland holds the record for most hat-tricks conceded with 26, having conceded more than half of all the hat-tricks scored in the competition.

=== List ===
Nordic Football Championship hat-tricks
#	Player	G	Time of goals	For	Result	Against	Tournament	Date	FIFA report
1.	Sven Rydell	3	66', 78', 89'	Sweden	6–1	Norway	1924–28 Nordic Football Championship	21 September 1924	Report
2.	Sven Rydell (2)	4	22', 42', 44', 62'	Sweden	7–3	Norway	1924–28 Nordic Football Championship	23 August 1925	Report
3.	Sven Rydell (3)	3	18', 23', 65'	Sweden	5–3	Norway	1924–28 Nordic Football Championship	26 June 1927	Report
4.	Jørgen Juve	3	8', 15', 73'	Norway	4–0	Finland	1929–32 Nordic Football Championship	18 June 1929	Report
5.	Pauli Jørgensen	3	11', 41', 73'	Denmark	8–0	Finland	1929–32 Nordic Football Championship	13 October 1929	Report
6.	Jørgen Juve (2)	3	17', 42', 66'	Norway	6–2	Finland	1929–32 Nordic Football Championship	1 June 1930	Report
7.	Pauli Jørgensen (2)	3	16', 65', 88'	Denmark	6–1	Sweden	1929–32 Nordic Football Championship	22 June 1930	Report
8.	Jørgen Juve (3)	3	16', 42', 47'	Norway	3–6	Sweden	1929–32 Nordic Football Championship	6 July 1930	Report
9.	Harry Lundahl	3	5', 13', 48'	Sweden	6–3	Norway	1929–32 Nordic Football Championship	6 July 1930	Report
10.	Lauri Lehtinen	3	9', 40', 41'	Finland	4–4	Sweden	1929–32 Nordic Football Championship	28 September 1930	Report
11.	Bertil Karlsson	3	26', 53', 64'	Sweden	4–4	Finland	1929–32 Nordic Football Championship	28 September 1930	Report
12.	Sune Zetterberg	4	18', 25', 30', 55'	Sweden	8–2	Finland	1929–32 Nordic Football Championship	3 July 1931	Report
13.	Evert Hansson	3	35', 65', 73'	Sweden	8–2	Finland	1929–32 Nordic Football Championship	3 July 1931	Report
14.	Jørgen Juve (4)	3	20', 36', 46'	Norway	5–1	Finland	1933–36 Nordic Football Championship	3 September 1933	Report
15.	Bertil Ericsson	4	7', 34', 61', 62'	Sweden	5–3	Denmark	1933–36 Nordic Football Championship	17 June 1934	Report
16.	Erik Persson	3	6', 42', 87'	Sweden	4–5	Finland	1933–36 Nordic Football Championship	23 September 1934	Report
16.	Odd Hoel	3	23', 52', 62'	Norway	5-1	Finland	1933–36 Nordic Football Championship	8 September 1935	Report
17.	Arne Brustad	4	11', 22', 25', 33'	Norway	9–0	Finland	1937–47 Nordic Football Championship	17 June 1938	Report
18.	Erik Persson (2)	3	30', 64', 67'	Sweden	5–1	Finland	1937–47 Nordic Football Championship	9 June 1939	Report
19.	Oskar Theisen	3	39', 57', 89'	Denmark	8–1	Finland	1937–47 Nordic Football Championship	17 September 1939	Report
20.	Gunnar Nordahl	3	39', 57', 89'	Sweden	7–0	Finland	1937–47 Nordic Football Championship	24 August 1947	Report
22.	Gunnar Nordahl (2)	5	24', 44', 62', 74', 80'	Sweden	5–3	Norway	1948–51 Nordic Football Championship	19 September 1948	Report
23.	Egon Jönsson	3	7', 9', 17'	Sweden	8–1	Finland	1948–51 Nordic Football Championship	2 October 1949	Report
24.	Ingvar Rydell	3	24', 75', 83'	Sweden	8–1	Finland	1948–51 Nordic Football Championship	2 October 1949	Report
25.	Kjell Kristiansen	3	36', 47', 75'	Norway	7–2	Finland	1952–55 Nordic Football Championship	31 August 1952	Report
26.	Lars Råberg	3	10', 48', 58'	Sweden	8–1	Finland	1952–55 Nordic Football Championship	21 September 1952	Report
27.	Hasse Persson	3	24', 50', 83'	Sweden	8–1	Finland	1952–55 Nordic Football Championship	21 September 1952	Report
28.	Birger Eklund	3	7', 30', 48'	Sweden	10–1	Finland	1952–55 Nordic Football Championship	15 August 1954	Report
29.	Kurt Hamrin	3	6', 71', 80'	Sweden	10–1	Finland	1952–55 Nordic Football Championship	15 August 1954	Report
30.	Nils-Åke Sandell	3	12', 38', 60'	Sweden	5–2	Norway	1952–55 Nordic Football Championship	10 October 1954	Report
31.	Gunnar Gren	3	18', 50', 77'	Sweden	5–1	Finland	1956–59 Nordic Football Championship	22 September 1957	Report
32.	Torbjörn Jonsson	3	39', 50', 69'	Sweden	7–1	Finland	1956–59 Nordic Football Championship	20 August 1958	Report
33.	Harald Nielsen	3	20', 22', 53'	Denmark	4–0	Finland	1956–59 Nordic Football Championship	4 October 1959	Report
34.	Rune Börjesson	3	26', 48', 75'	Sweden	6–2	Norway	1956–59 Nordic Football Championship	18 October 1959	Report
35.	Jørn Sørensen	3	7', 52', 85'	Denmark	9–1	Finland	1960–63 Nordic Football Championship	15 October 1961	Report
36.	Ole Madsen	3	31', 44', 87'	Denmark	6–1	Norway	1960–63 Nordic Football Championship	11 June 1962	Report
37.	Tom Turesson	3	60', 63', 70'	Sweden	4–2	Norway	1964–67 Nordic Football Championship	18 September 1966	Report
38.	Erik Dyreborg	5	40', 41', 57', 60', 63'	Denmark	5–0	Norway	1964–67 Nordic Football Championship	24 September 1967	Report
39.	Tommy Troelsen	3	22', 24', 77'	Denmark	5–1	Norway	1968–71 Nordic Football Championship	23 June 1968	Report
40.	Bent Jensen	3	12', 14', 43'	Denmark	5–2	Finland	1968–71 Nordic Football Championship	10 September 1969	Report
41.	Pål Jacobsen	4	30', 39', 73', 83'	Norway	6–1	Finland	1978–80 Nordic Football Championship	21 August 1980	Report

== Other competitions ==
Competition	Year	Champions	Runners-up	Next edition
National teams (Men's)
Nordic Football Championship	2020-21	Finland	Iceland	TBD
Nordic Under-17 Championship	2026	Denmark	Norway	TBD
Nordic Futsal Cup	2023	Denmark	Latvia	TBD
National teams (Women's)
Women's Nordic Football Championship	1982	Denmark	Sweden	TBD
Women's Nordic U20 - U21 - U23 Football	2009	Sweden	Germany	TBD
Nordic U16 - U17 Women's Football	2026	Finland	Denmark	TBD

== See also ==
- Women's Nordic Football Championship
- Nordic Under-20, Under-21 and Under-23 Women's Football Championship
- Nordic Under-17 Football Championship
- Nordic Under-17 Women's Football Championship
- Nordic Futsal Cup
- Royal League
