= 1928 in Norwegian football =

Football in Norway
Men's football
- NM: Ørn

Results from Norwegian football in 1928.

== Østlandsligaen 1927/28 (Unofficial) ==
=== Hovedserien ===
Pos	Team	Pld	W	D	L	GF	GA	GD	Pts	Relegation
1	Mjøndalen	14	11	1	2	46	19	+27	23	
2	Ørn	14	8	5	1	32	14	+18	21	
3	Odd	14	9	3	2	37	21	+16	21	
4	Kvik (Halden)	14	8	3	3	44	20	+24	19	
5	Sarpsborg	14	6	4	4	36	21	+15	16	
6	Strømsgodset	14	5	5	4	28	25	+3	15	
7	Urædd	14	5	4	5	22	31	−9	14	
8	Larvik Turn	14	4	4	6	20	21	−1	12	
9	Moss	14	6	0	8	22	27	−5	12	
10	Frigg	14	5	2	7	23	29	−6	12	
11	Lyn	14	5	2	7	23	37	−14	12	
12	Fram (Larvik)	14	2	7	5	22	31	−9	11	Relegated
13	Gjøa	14	3	3	8	27	32	−5	9	Relegated
14	Vålerengen	14	3	3	8	19	33	−14	9	Relegated
15	Holmestrand	14	1	2	11	16	56	−40	4	Relegated

=== Østserien ===
Pos	Team	Pld	W	D	L	GF	GA	GD	Pts	Promotion
1	Fredrikstad	8	6	1	1	30	12	+18	13	Promoted
2	Lisleby	8	5	2	1	36	13	+23	12	Promoted
3	Selbak	8	6	0	2	24	15	+9	12	
4	Strong	8	4	1	3	23	20	+3	9	
5	Østsiden IF	8	3	3	2	16	16	0	9	
6	Torp	8	3	0	5	16	28	−12	6	
7	B 14	8	2	1	5	14	24	−10	5	
8	Trygg	8	1	2	5	6	20	−14	4	
9	Kampørn	8	1	0	7	8	25	−17	2	

=== Vestserien ===
Pos	Team	Pld	W	D	L	GF	GA	GD	Pts	Promotion
1	Drafn	11	7	3	1	34	13	+21	17	Promoted
2	Drammens BK	11	7	1	3	35	18	+17	15	Promoted
3	Tønsbergkameratene	11	6	3	2	30	21	+9	15	
4	Falk	11	5	3	3	26	19	+7	13	
5	Storm	11	6	1	4	27	21	+6	13	
6	Skiold	11	4	4	3	15	18	−3	12	
7	Birkebeineren	11	5	1	5	25	23	+2	11	
8	Pors	11	2	5	4	19	22	−3	9	
9	Agnes	11	4	1	6	19	30	−11	9	
10	Skotfoss	11	3	1	7	24	33	−9	7	
11	Nanset	11	2	3	6	24	43	−19	7	
12	Sandefjord	11	1	2	8	17	34	−17	4	

== Class A of local association leagues ==
Class A of local association leagues (kretsserier) is the predecessor of a national league competition.

League	Champion
Østfold	No championship because of the 1927–28 Østlandsligaen
Oslo	No championship because of the 1927–28 Østlandsligaen
Follo	Ski
Aker	Stabæk
Lillestrøm og omegn^{1}	Lillestrøm
Øvre Romerike	Årnes
Eidsvoll og omegn^{1}	Bøn
Oplandene	Lyn (Gjøvik)
Glommendalen	Grue
Nord-Østerdal	Tynset
Trysil og Engerdal	Nybergsund
Røyken og Hurum	Gråbein
Øvre Buskerud	Jevnaker
Drammen og omegn	No championship because of the 1927–28 Østlandsligaen
Vestfold	No championship because of the 1927–28 Østlandsligaen
Grenland	No championship because of the 1927–28 Østlandsligaen
Øvre Telemark	Tell
Aust-Agder	Kragerø
Vest-Agder	Flekkefjord
Rogaland	Viking
Hordaland	Voss
Bergen	Brann
Sogn og Fjordane	Falken (Høyanger)
Søndmøre	Aalesund
Romsdalske	Kristiansund
Sør-Trøndelag	Ranheim
Trondhjem	Brage
Nord-Trøndelag	Steinkjer
Namdal	Namsos
Helgeland	Mosjøen
Lofoten og Vesterålen	Narvik/Nor
Troms	Skarp
Finnmark	Vardø

- ^{1}In the following season, local associations Lillestrøm og omegn and Eidsvoll og omegn merged to form Romerike.

== Norwegian Cup ==
=== Final ===
14 October 1928

Ørn	2–1	Lyn
Fredriksen 1'; Thorstensen 53'	Report	Riberg 30'

Halden Stadion, Halden
Attendance: 6,717
Referee: Paulus Nilsen (Brodd)

== National team ==
=== Results ===
3 June Friendly	Finland	0–6	Norway	Helsinki, Finland
14:30 (UTC+2); Match 72		Report	E. Andersen 4', 16'; Gundersen 32', 52'; S. Andersen 61'; Helgesen 62'	Stadium: Töölön Pallokenttä; Attendance: 6,000; Referee: Ragnar Bäckström (Sweden)

7 June 1924–28 Nordic Championship	Sweden	6–1	Norway	Stockholm, Sweden
19:15 (UTC+1); Match 73	Keller 15', 70'; Lundahl 22', 57'; Kroon 28', 76'	Report	Helgesen 54'	Stadium: Olympic Stadium; Attendance: 19,000; Referee: Otto Remke (Denmark)

17 June 1924–28 Nordic Championship	Norway	2–3	Denmark	Oslo, Norway
13:00 (UTC+1); Match 74	Berstad 64' (pen.); S. Andersen 81'	Report	Hansen 66'; Rohde 70'; Jørgensen 72'	Stadium: Ullevaal Stadion; Attendance: 15,000; Referee: Vidar Stenborg (Sweden)

23 September Friendly	Norway	0–2	Germany	Oslo, Norway
13:00 (UTC+1); Match 75		Report	Schmitt 17'; Kuzzora 62'	Stadium: Ullevaal Stadion; Attendance: 16,400; Referee: Lauritz Andersen (Denmark)

=== Nordic Football Championship ===
Table

	Team	Pld	W	D	L	GF		GA	GD	Pts
1	Denmark	10	7	2	1	25	–	11	+14	16
2	Sweden	10	6	1	3	31	–	19	+12	13
3	Norway	10	0	1	9	17	–	43	–26	1
