= 1934 in Norwegian football =

Football in Norway
Men's football
- NM: Mjøndalen

Results from Norwegian football in 1934. See also 1933 in Norwegian football and 1935 in Norwegian football

== Class A of local association leagues ==
Class A of local association leagues (kretsserier) is the predecessor of a national league competition.

League	Champion
Østfold	Kvik (Halden)
Oslo	Vålerengen
Follo	Drøbak
Aker	Nydalen
Vestre Romerike	Bøn
Østre Romerike	Haga
Oplandene	Raufoss
Glåmdal	Brane
Nord-Østerdal	Bergmann
Sør-Østerdal	Trysilgutten
Gudbrandsdal	Otta
Valdres	Nordre Land
Røyken og Hurum	Roy
Øvre Buskerud	Geithus
Drammen og omegn	Mjøndalen
Vestfold	Fram (Larvik)
Grenland	Odd
Øvre Telemark	Rjukan
Aust-Agder	Grane (Arendal)
Vest-Agder	Vigør
Rogaland	Viking
Sunnhordaland	Stord
Midthordland	Voss
Bergen	Brann
Sogn og Fjordane	Høyanger
Sunnmøre	Aalesund
Romsdal	Veblungsnes
Nordmøre	Kristiansund
Sør-Trøndelag	Ranheim
Trondhjem	Kvik (Trondhjem)
Nord-Trøndelag	Steinkjer
Namdal	Namsos
Helgeland	Mo
Lofoten og Vesterålen^{1}	Glimt
Troms	Mjølner
Troms Innland	Takelvdal
Vest-Finnmark	Alta
Midt-Finnmark	Gamvik
Aust-Finnmark	Kirkenes

- ^{1}In the following season, Lofoten og Vesterålen local association split into Salten and Lofoten og Vesterålen.

== Norwegian Cup ==
=== Final ===
14 October 1934

Mjøndalen	2–1 (a.e.t.)	Sarpsborg
E. Andersen 74'; Hval 116' (pen.)	Report	Gundersen 66'

Sorgenfri gressbane, Trondhiem
Attendance: 8,000
Referee: Kolbjørn Dæhlen (Skeid)

== Northern Norwegian Cup ==
=== Final ===
Glimt	4–3	Kirkenes
	Report

== National team ==
June 10: Norway – Austria 4-0, friendly

July 1: Sweden – Norway 3-3, friendly

September 2: Norway – Finland 4-2, friendly

September 23: Norway – Denmark 3-1, friendly
