= 1935 in Norwegian football =

Football in Norway
Men's football
- NM: Fredrikstad

Results from Norwegian football in 1935.

== Class A of local association leagues ==
Class A of local association leagues (kretsserier) is the predecessor of a national league competition.

League	Champion
Østfold	Fredrikstad
Oslo	Lyn
Follo	Hølen
Aker	Nydalen
Vestre Romerike	Lillestrøm
Østre Romerike	Funnefoss
Oplandene	Raufoss
Glåmdal	Magnor
Nord-Østerdal	Gå På
Sør-Østerdal	Elverum
Gudbrandsdal	Otta
Valdres	Begnadalen
Røyken og Hurum^{1}	Roy
Øvre Buskerud	Geithus
Drammen og omegn^{1}	Mjøndalen
Vestfold	Fram (Larvik)
Grenland	Odd
Øvre Telemark	Snøgg
Aust-Agder	Grane (Arendal)
Vest-Agder	Vigør
Rogaland	Viking
Sunnhordaland	Stord
Midthordland	Voss
Bergen	Brann
Sogn og Fjordane	Høyanger
Sunnmøre	Aalesund
Romsdal	Molde
Nordmøre	Clausenengen
Sør-Trøndelag	Ranheim
Trondhjem	Freidig
Nord-Trøndelag	Steinkjer
Namdal	Namsos
Helgeland	Mosjøen
Salten	Glimt
Lofoten og Vesterålen	Svolvær
Troms	Mjølner
Troms Innland	Skøelv
Vest-Finnmark	Alta
Midt-Finnmark	Gamvik
Aust-Finnmark	Kirkenes

- ^{1}In the following season, Røyken og Hurum local association merged with Drammen og omegn to form Drammen og omegn.

== Norwegian Cup ==
=== Final ===
20 October 1935

Fredrikstad	4–0	Sarpsborg
Ileby 15'; Børresen 55'; Brynildsen 85', 86'	Report

Sarpsborg Stadion, Sarpsborg
Attendance: 15,200
Referee: Thoralf Christiansen (Stavanger)

== Northern Norwegian Cup ==
=== Final ===
Mjølner	4–0	Harstad
	Report

== National team ==
May 31: Norway – Hungary 2–0, friendly

June 23: Denmark – Norway 1–0, friendly

June 27: Norway – Germany 1-1, friendly

September 8: Finland – Norway 1–5, friendly

September 22: Norway – Sweden 0–2, friendly

November 3: Switzerland – Norway 2–0, friendly
