= Arne Børresen =

Norwegian footballer (1907-1947)

Personal information
- Full name: Arne Børresen
- Date of birth: 29 December 1907
- Place of birth: Fredrikstad, Norway
- Date of death: 14 December 1947 (aged 39)
- Place of death: Halden, Norway
- Position: Forward

Senior career*
Years	Team	Apps	(Gls)
1928–1937	Fredrikstad		
1945–1947	Kvik Halden		

International career
1928–1937	Norway	25	(1)
- * Club domestic league appearances and goals

Arne Børresen (29 December 1907 – 14 December 1947) was a Norwegian international football forward. On club level he played for Fredrikstad and Kvik Halden. He was capped 25 times for Norway and scored one goal.

== Club career ==
Børresen was born in Fredrikstad, and as a kid he played for the local team Kvik. He joined Fredrikstad FK youth department in 1924, and in 1927 he made a breakthrough in the first team, alongside Sten Moe and Karl Pedersen. The three youngsters was all contributors to Fredrikstad's success in the 1930s. In 1932, Fredrikstad won their first Norwegian Cup with Børresen scoring the first goal in the 6–1 win against Ørn in the final.

Fredrikstad's next cup victory came in 1935, and Børresen scored the match-winning goal against Odd in the semi-final as well as one goal in the 4–0 win against the local rivals Sarpsborg in the final. He won the cup for the last time in 1936, before he was injured in 1937.

After the war, Børresen played for Kvik Halden until his death in 1947.

== International career ==
Børresen made his debut for Norway against Germany on 23 September 1928. This was also the match where his teammates Sten Moe and Karl Pedersen made their national team debut. The highlight of Børresen's national team career came in the Nordic Championship match against Sweden in 1932, when Norway won 4-1 and won the trophy, and Børresen was named man of the match. He featured regularly in the national team matches in 1933 and 1934, but was not elected for the squad to play at Berlin Olympics. His last national team match was the 2–0 win against Finland in Helsinki on 15 September 1937. As this was his 25th cap, he was awarded the Gold Watch and was the first Fredrikstad-player to reach this feat.

== Personal life and death ==
Børresen moved to Halden in 1934 to work at Fresko skofabrikk. He died from pneumonia in December 1947, before he turned 40. Three months earlier he had even played a match against SK Brann.
