= Gep Landaal =

Dutch footballer

Personal information
- Date of birth: 2 December 1899
- Date of death: 1 July 1975 (aged 75)

International career
| Years | Team | Apps | (Gls) |
| 1929–1930 | Netherlands | 8 | (2) |

Gep Landaal (2 December 1899 – 1 July 1975) was a Dutch footballer. He played in eight matches for the Netherlands national football team from 1929 to 1930.
