= Raphaël van Praag =

Belgian football referee (1885–1934)

- Full name: Raphaël Leon van Praag
- Born: 12 September 1885; Amsterdam, Netherlands
- Died: 31 August 1934 (aged 48); Antwerp, Belgium

Domestic
Years	League	Role
?–1934	Belgian First Division	Referee

International
Years	League	Role
1911–34	FIFA listed	Referee

Raphaël Leon van Praag (12 September 1885 – 31 August 1934) was a Dutch-born Belgian football referee, football official, sports journalist. He officiated 12 international matches between 1911 and 1934.

As a board member of Beerschot, he helped to lead the club to four national championships within five years. Van Praag was the sports editor for Le Neptune and Het Handelsblad van Antwerpen, and editorial secretary for Sportleven, the official organ of the Belgian Football Association. An active member of the Belgian Foutbool Association from 1907, he served as the Flemish chairman of its Central Referee Committee at the time of his death.

== Career ==
=== League referee ===
Van Praag moved to Antwerp, Belgium between 1905 and 1907, from Amsterdam where he already worked as a football referee. Only a few years after his arrival, he was already being described as an Antwerpian. Life as a domestic referee wasn't always flashy, for example, Van Praag was spotted standing in the train from Brussels to Antwerp after a game, and invited to join the Belgian Cardinal Désiré-Joseph Mercier, who traveled in the reserved car.

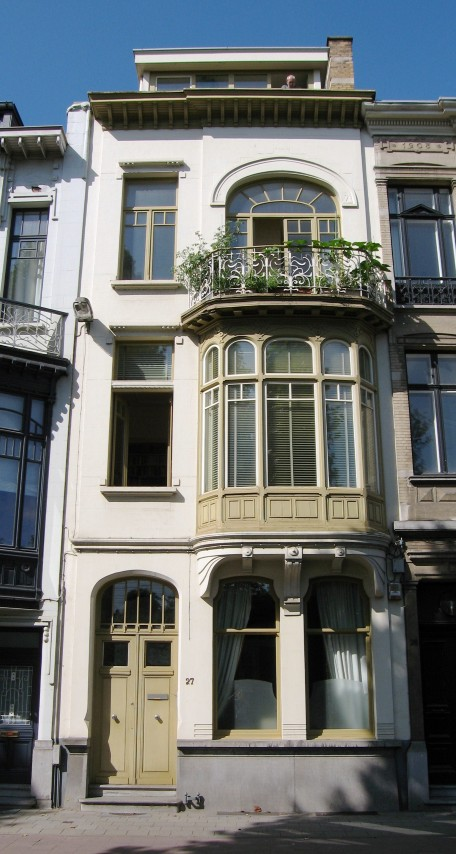
Residence of Van Praag in Antwerp. Photo from 2015.

=== International referee ===
After several years in the Belgian First Division, the Referees Committee of the Belgian FA nominated him as an international referee, thus becoming a member of FIFA. As such, he officiated a total of 12 international matches between 1911 and 1934.

In his international debut on 29 October 1911, the 26-year-old van Praag officiated a friendly match between Luxembourg and France in Luxembourg City, which ended in a 4–1 win to the latter. He had to wait nearly a decade for his next international appearance, which came at the 1920 Olympic Games in Antwerp, where he refereed two matches, both featuring Yugoslavia, which lost 7–0 to Czechoslovakia in the first-round on 28 August, and then defeated Egypt 4–2 in a first-round consolation match on 3 September. In the former meeting, he awarded a late penalty to the Czechs which was successfully converted by Jan Vaník to seal a 7–0 victory, which remains the biggest victory of the Czechoslovakia national team as well as the heaviest defeat of Yugoslavia. Also in September, he refereed a further two matches, both featuring an Antwerp XI, which lost to Egypt 4–2 and then defeated Yugoslavia 6–0.

Van Praag went on to officiate a further ten official international meetings between 1921 and 1934, including a 1927–1930 Central European Cup match between Hungary and Czechoslovakia in April 1928, which was won by the Magyar (2–0), and a 1929–32 Nordic Football Championship match between Sweden and Norway in Gothenburg on 1 July 1932, which ended in a 4–1 win to the latter. In between these two performances, he acted as a linesman in two matches at the 1928 Olympic Games in Amsterdam. He made his last two international appearances in March 1934, when he oversaw two Iberian derbies in a two-legged 1934 World Cup qualifier, which was won by Spain 11–1 on aggregate.

On 30 October 1927, van Praag refereed the first leg of the final of the 1927 Mitropa Cup between Sparta Prague and Rapid Wien, which ended in a 6–2 win for Prague.

=== Sports official ===
Van Praag was the secretary of the Entente Antwerp association, and helped to organise the annual international tournament during Easter.

He was also one of the most active board members of Beerschot football club. During his tenure, the club won the Belgian championships four times within five years. After scoring the match-winning goal that allowed Beerschot to win its first Belgian league title in 1921–22, player Arthur Van Meenen got into an argument with Van Praag during one of his many championship celebrations, a conflict that escalated to such a degree that Beerschot decided to transfer him to Royal Antwerp.

=== Sports journalist ===
Van Praag was the head of the sports section at the monthly magazine Le Neptune. He then moved to Het Handelsblad van Antwerpen. He later became the founding editor of Sportleven, the official magazine of the Belgian Football Association.

== Personal life and death ==
Van Praag was born in Amsterdam on 12 September 1885 as the first child of Emanuel van Praag, a Jewish diamond cutter, and to Betsy van Praag-Van Dam, a Jewish homemaker.

On 8 May 1911, Van Praag married Adele Mathilde Cauwenbergh, who was born in Antwerp. Two years later, his brother, Leon Raphaël van Praag, married her sister. Both marriages ended in divorce.

In 1922, Van Praag lived on Stanleystraat 27, in Antwerp. On 19 January 1932, Van Praag was naturalized as a Belgian citizen.

Van Praag died suddenly in Antwerp on 31 August 1934, after suffering a stroke at the age of 48.
