= Karl Pedersen (footballer) =

Norwegian footballer (1907-1977)

Personal information
- Date of birth: 18 April 1907
- Date of death: 25 October 1977 (aged 70)

International career
Years	Team	Apps	(Gls)
1928	Norway	1	(0)

Karl Pedersen (18 April 1907 – 25 October 1977) was a Norwegian footballer. He played in one match for the Norway national football team in 1928.
