= Harald Gundersen =

Norwegian footballer (1905-1979)

Personal information
- Date of birth: 11 October 1905
- Date of death: 7 November 1979 (aged 74)

International career
Years	Team	Apps	(Gls)
1929	Norway	2	(0)

Harald Gundersen (11 October 1905 – 7 November 1979) was a Norwegian footballer. He played in two matches for the Norway national football team in 1929.
