= Sune Zetterberg =

Swedish footballer

Personal information
- Full name: Karl Sune Zetterberg
- Date of birth: 12 December 1907
- Place of birth: Stora Tuna, Borlänge, Sweden
- Date of death: 9 June 1962 (aged 54)
- Place of death: Borlänge, Sweden
- Position: Forward

Senior career*
Years	Team	Apps	(Gls)
- Brage

International career
1931	Sweden	4	(6)
- * Club domestic league appearances and goals

Karl Sune Zetterberg (12 December 1907 – 9 June 1962) was a Swedish footballer who played for Brage. He was capped four times for the Sweden men's national football team in 1931, scoring six goals.

== Career statistics ==
=== International ===
Appearances and goals by national team and year
National team	Year	Apps	Goals
Sweden	1931	4	6
Total		4	6

=== International goals ===
Scores and results list Sweden's goal tally first.

No	Date	Venue	Opponent	Score	Result	Competition
1.	3 July 1931	Stockholm Olympic Stadium, Stockholm, Sweden	Finland	2–0	8–2	1929–32 Nordic Football Championship
2.	3 July 1931	Stockholm Olympic Stadium, Stockholm, Sweden	Finland	3–0	8–2	1929–32 Nordic Football Championship
3.	3 July 1931	Stockholm Olympic Stadium, Stockholm, Sweden	Finland	4–0	8–2	1929–32 Nordic Football Championship
4.	3 July 1931	Stockholm Olympic Stadium, Stockholm, Sweden	Finland	6–0	8–2	1929–32 Nordic Football Championship
5.	8 July 1931	Idrottsplatsen, Sandviken, Sweden	Estonia	2–0	3–1	Friendly
6.	8 July 1931	Idrottsplatsen, Sandviken, Sweden	Estonia	3–0	3–1	Friendly
