= Israel Krupp =

Norwegian footballer (1908-1991)

Personal information
- Date of birth: 9 March 1908
- Date of death: 25 October 1991 (aged 83)

International career
Years	Team	Apps	(Gls)
1930	Norway	1	(1)

Israel Krupp (9 March 1908 – 25 October 1991) was a Norwegian footballer. He played in one match for the Norway national football team in 1930.
