= Eyolf Kleven =

Danish footballer (1908–1989)

Personal information
- Full name: Birger Eyolf Kleven
- Date of birth: 27 February 1908
- Date of death: 8 February 1989 (aged 80)
- Positions: Inside forward; wing-half

Senior career*
Years	Team	Apps	(Gls)
1927–1945	Akademisk Boldklub		

International career
1930–1942	Denmark	30	(8)
- * Club domestic league appearances and goals

Birger Eyolf Kleven (27 February 1908 – 8 February 1989) was a Danish amateur footballer who played 30 games and scored eight goals for the Denmark national team from 1930 to 1942. Born in Copenhagen, Kleven played as a forward and midfielder for Copenhagen club AB from 1927 to 1945.

Kleven was a small inside forward, averse to the physical side of the game, but lightning quick, with good dribbling skills and fantastic long passing ability. He made his debut for the Danish national team in June 1930. Kleven formed a good partnership with centre forward Pauli Jørgensen, and scored a single goal in each of his first three international games. He was a part of the Danish team which lost the so-called Battle of Breslau game 8–0 to the Germany in May 1937, but Kleven was one of only four players not dropped from the Danish team afterwards. Having played his 29th national team game, his international career went on a hiatus in June 1938.

With AB, Kleven won the Danish championship in 1937. In his later AB career, Kleven moved back into the wing half-back position. He made a one-game comeback to the national team 1942, but the wing half-back pairing of Kleven and Walther Christensen were defensively weak, and Denmark lost 3–0 to Sweden. This was Kleven's 30th and last international game. With AB, Kleven won two further Danish championships in 1943 and 1945.

He is the younger brother of Danish international and AB head coach Arne Kleven.
