= Lauri Lehtinen (footballer) =

Finnish footballer (1927–2016)

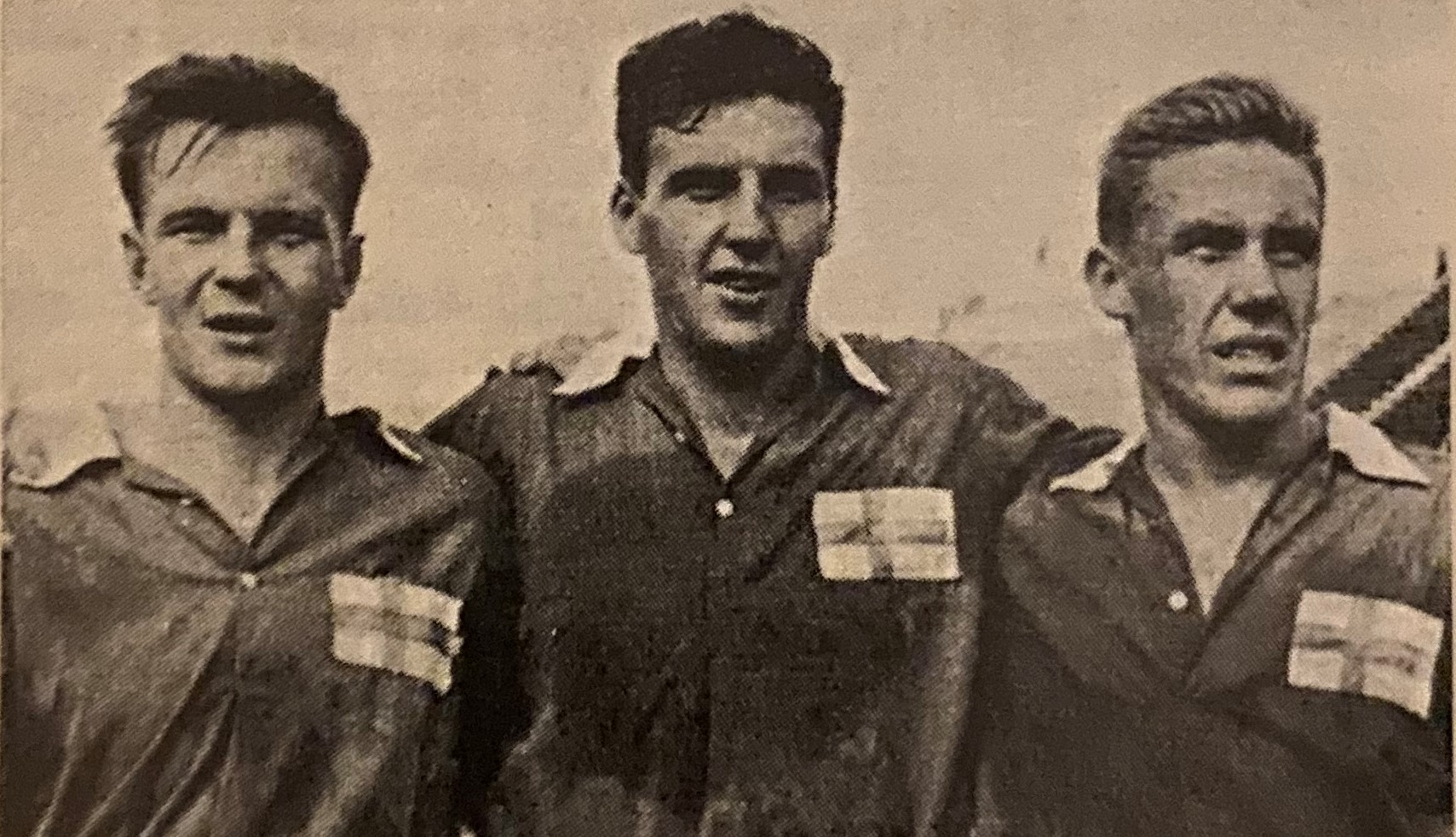
- Lehtinen (middle) in 1959

Personal information
- Date of birth: 19 August 1927
- Date of death: 23 March 2016 (aged 88)
- Position: Midfielder

Senior career*
Years	Team	Apps	(Gls)
- HJK Helsinki

International career
1952–1960	Finland	26	(0)
- * Club domestic league appearances and goals

Lauri Lehtinen (19 August 1927 – 23 March 2016) was a Finnish footballer who played as a midfielder. He made 26 appearances for the Finland national team from 1952 to 1960. He was also named in Finland's squad for the Group 2 qualification tournament for the 1954 FIFA World Cup.
