= Alf Nielsen =

Norwegian footballer (1908-1992)

Personal information
- Date of birth: 20 February 1908
- Date of death: 1 January 1992 (aged 83)

International career
Years	Team	Apps	(Gls)
1930	Norway	1	(1)

Alf Nielsen (20 February 1908 – 1 January 1992) was a Norwegian footballer. He played in one match for the Norway national football team in 1930.
