= Erling Andersen (footballer) =

Norwegian footballer (1901-1969)

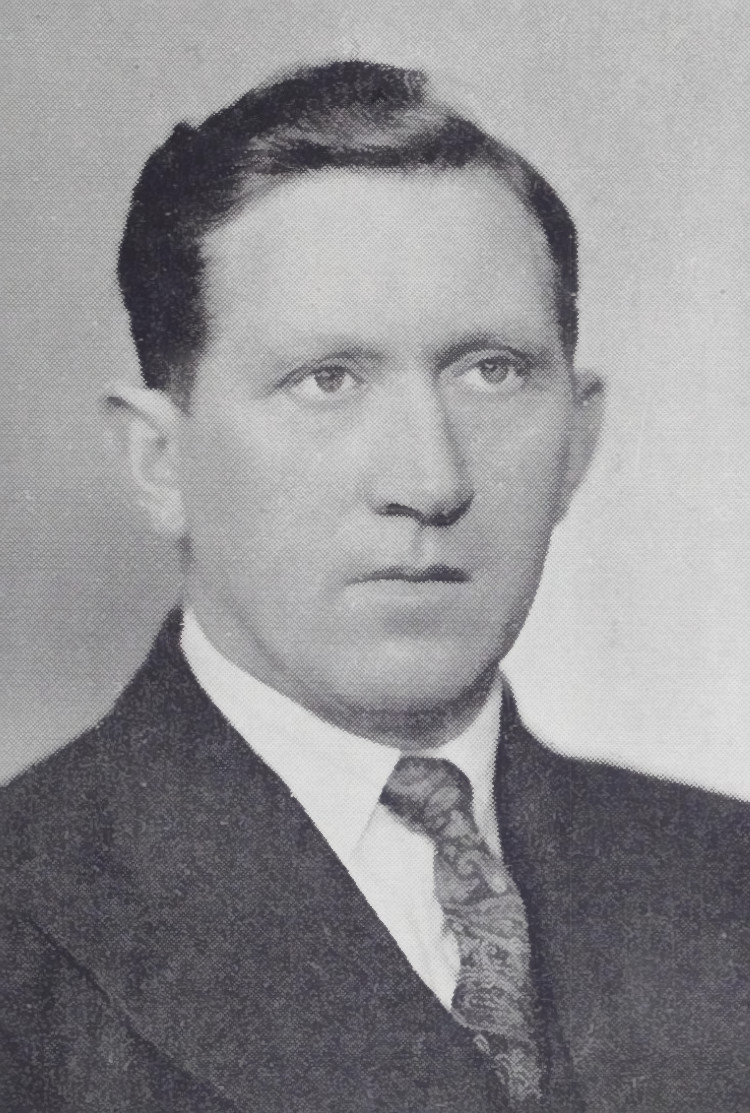

Personal information
- Full name: Erling Kristoffer Andersen
- Date of birth: 9 September 1901
- Place of birth: Mjøndalen, Norway
- Date of death: 9 January 1969 (aged 67)

International career
Years	Team	Apps	(Gls)
1929	Norway	2	(3)

Erling Andersen (9 September 1901 – 9 January 1969) was a Norwegian footballer. He played in two matches for the Norway national football team in 1929.
