= Harald Pettersen (footballer) =

Norwegian footballer (1911-1978)

Personal information
- Date of birth: 8 December 1911
- Date of death: 18 March 1978 (aged 66)

International career
Years	Team	Apps	(Gls)
1930–1931	Norway	3	(1)

Harald Pettersen (8 December 1911 – 18 March 1978) was a Norwegian footballer. He played in three matches for the Norway national football team from 1930 to 1931.
