= Oscar Thorstensen =

Norwegian footballer (1901-1966)

Personal information
- Date of birth: 13 July 1901
- Date of death: 2 January 1966 (aged 64)

International career
Years	Team	Apps	(Gls)
1924–1929	Norway	6	(0)

Oscar Thorstensen (13 July 1901 – 2 January 1966) was a Norwegian footballer. He played in six matches for the Norway national football team from 1924 to 1929.
