= Dæhlenengen SBK =

Norwegian sports club

Dæhlenengen Ski- og Ballklubb
- Founded: 18 March 1916
- Dissolved: 30 October 1940
- Based in: Oslo
- Stadium: Dælenenga idrettspark (bandy, association football)

Dæhlenengen Ski- og Ballklubb was a multi-sports club located in Grünerløkka, Oslo. Founded 18 March 1916, the club had departments within bandy, football and skiing. Their home ground was Dælenenga idrettspark.

On 30 October 1940, the club merged with neighbours SK Strong, and the new name of the club was Sportsklubben Trym. Due to the German occupation of Norway, there was no activity in the new club before the end of World War II in 1945. It was then decided that the club was taking back the name Strong. In 1952, Strong merged with two other Grünerløkka-based clubs and formed Grüner IL.

== Football ==
Dæhlenengen SBK
- Full name: Dæhlenengen Ski- og Ballklubb
- Founded: 18 March 1916; 108 years ago
- Dissolved: 30 October 1940
- Ground: Dælenenga idrettspark
Home colours

Dæhlenengen SBK's football team became regional champions in class C in 1925, class D in 1926 and class B in 1928. The team played in Oslo's class A from 1929 till the end of the 1935 season. John Bøhleng represented Dæhlenengen while playing for Norway in 1933.
