= Evert Hansson =

Swedish footballer

Personal information
- Date of birth: 23 February 1908
- Place of birth: Gothenburg, Sweden
- Date of death: 17 January 1979 (aged 70)
- Position: Midfielder

Senior career*
Years	Team	Apps	(Gls)
- IK Virgo
1930–1934	Örgryte IS		

International career
1930–1933	Sweden	13	(5)
- * Club domestic league appearances and goals

Evert Hansson (23 February 1908 – 17 January 1979) was a Swedish footballer who played as a midfielder.
