= Kaj Uldaler =

Danish footballer (1906–1987)

Personal information
- Birth name: Kaj Uldahl Christoffersen
- Date of birth: 28 November 1906
- Place of birth: Copenhagen, Denmark
- Date of death: 6 April 1987 (aged 80)
- Position: Inside left

Youth career
- Boldklubben Frem

Senior career*
Years	Team	Apps	(Gls)
1924–1927	Boldklubben Frem	39	(36)
1928–1942	B 93	202	(131)

International career
1927–1939	Denmark	38	(15)

Managerial career
- 1948: Helsingør
- * Club domestic league appearances and goals

Kaj Uldaler (born Kaj Uldahl Christoffersen; 28 November 1906 – 6 April 1987) was a Danish amateur football player. He spent his club career with BK Frem and B.93, scoring 131 goals in 202 games for B.93. He scored 15 goals in 38 internationals for the Denmark national football team from 1927 to 1939. He made his international debut in the 25-anniversary game of the Football Association of Norway, and played his last game in the 50-anniversary tournament of the Danish Football Association.

== Honours ==
- Danish Championships: 1922–23 with Frem, 1928–29, 1929–30, 1933–34, 1934–35 and 1938–39 with B 93
