= Kåre Kongsvik =

Norwegian footballer (1902-1982)

Personal information
- Date of birth: 10 April 1902
- Date of death: 12 November 1982 (aged 80)

International career
Years	Team	Apps	(Gls)
1929–1930	Norway	3	(1)

Kåre Kongsvik (10 April 1902 – 12 November 1982) was a Norwegian footballer. He played in three matches for the Norway national football team from 1929 to 1930.
