= Morten Pettersen (footballer, born 1909) =

Norwegian footballer

Personal information
- Date of birth: 18 May 1909
- Date of death: 3 June 1982 (aged 73)

International career
Years	Team	Apps	(Gls)
1930–1936	Norway	5	(4)

Morten Pettersen (18 May 1909 – 3 June 1982) was a Norwegian footballer. He played in five matches for the Norway national football team from 1930 to 1936.
