= FK Narvik/Nor =

Norwegian football club

- Full name: Fotballklubben Narvik/Nor
- Founded: 1914
- Dissolved: 1997; merged with FK Mjølner
- Ground: Narvik stadion

Fotballklubben Narvik/Nor was a Norwegian association football club from Narvik. It existed until late 1997, when it was merged with FK Mjølner to form Narvik FK. Narvik FK changed its name to Mjølner FK in 2005.

== History ==
The club won the Northern Norwegian Cup in 1929, 1937, 1950 og 1959. It played in the Second Division (third tier) for many years, but at the second tier in the seasons 1970, 1974 and 1975.

In 1997, it played in the Second Division. In group 8 it finished in seventh place, one point behind Mjølner-Narvik. On 23 October 1997 an extraordinary general meeting in Narvik/Nor decided unanimously to discontinue the club and to merge with FK Mjølner-Narvik to form Narvik FK. The new club had the name Narvik FK until 2005, when it was changed to FK Mjølner.

Former players were Thomas Hafstad, Jonny Hanssen and Espen Olafsen.
