= Finn Johannesen =

Norwegian footballer (1907-1984)

Personal information
- Date of birth: 23 August 1907
- Date of death: 27 December 1984 (aged 77)

International career
| Years | Team | Apps | (Gls) |
| 1931–1933 | Norway | 6 | (3) |

Finn Johannesen (23 August 1907 – 27 December 1984) was a Norwegian footballer. He played in six matches for the Norway national football team from 1931 to 1933.
