= Henry Hansen (footballer) =

Danish footballer (1899–1952)

Axel Bjergne Henry Hansson (November 21, 1899 – February 8, 1952) simply known as Henry Hansen, was a Danish amateur association football player, who played 38 games and scored 10 goals for the Danish national team from 1922 to 1934. Born in Copenhagen, Hanson played as a forward for Copenhagen club B 1903. He was the younger brother of Danish international Carl "Skoma'r" Hansen, who also played for Rangers F.C. in Glasgow.
