= Knud Christophersen =

Danish footballer (1905–1975)

Personal information
- Full name: Knud Ejgild Christophersen
- Date of birth: 15 November 1905
- Place of birth: Copenhagen, Denmark
- Date of death: 8 March 1975 (aged 69)
- Position: Defender

Youth career
- Boldklubben Frem
- KFUM

Senior career*
Years	Team	Apps	(Gls)
1924–1925	KFUM		
1926–1935	Boldklubben Frem	156	(16)

International career
1929–1934	Denmark	21	(6)
- * Club domestic league appearances and goals

Knud Ejgild Christophersen (15 November 1905 - 8 March 1975) was a Danish football defender with Frem and the Danish national team and a handball goalkeeper with Efterslægten.

Christophersen who won Danish Championships with Frem in 1931 and 1933 was committee member of the Copenhagen Football Association in the years 1935–1937.

== Honours ==
Team

- Danish Championships: 1930-31 and 1932–33 with Frem
- Danish Cup: 1927 with Frem
