= Jørgen Juve =

Norwegian footballer, jurist, and writer (1906–1983)

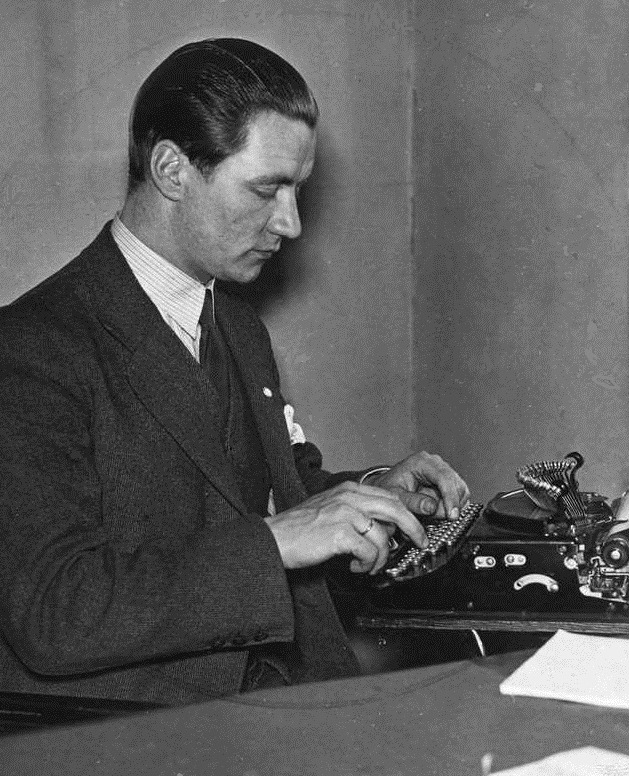
- Juve in the mid-1930s
- Born: 22 November 1906; Porsgrunn, Norway
- Died: 12 April 1983 (aged 76); Oslo, Norway
- Education: Jurisprudence
- Occupations: Journalist, non-fiction writer
- Spouse(s): Erna Riberg (m. 1932, divorced) Eva Røine
Association football career
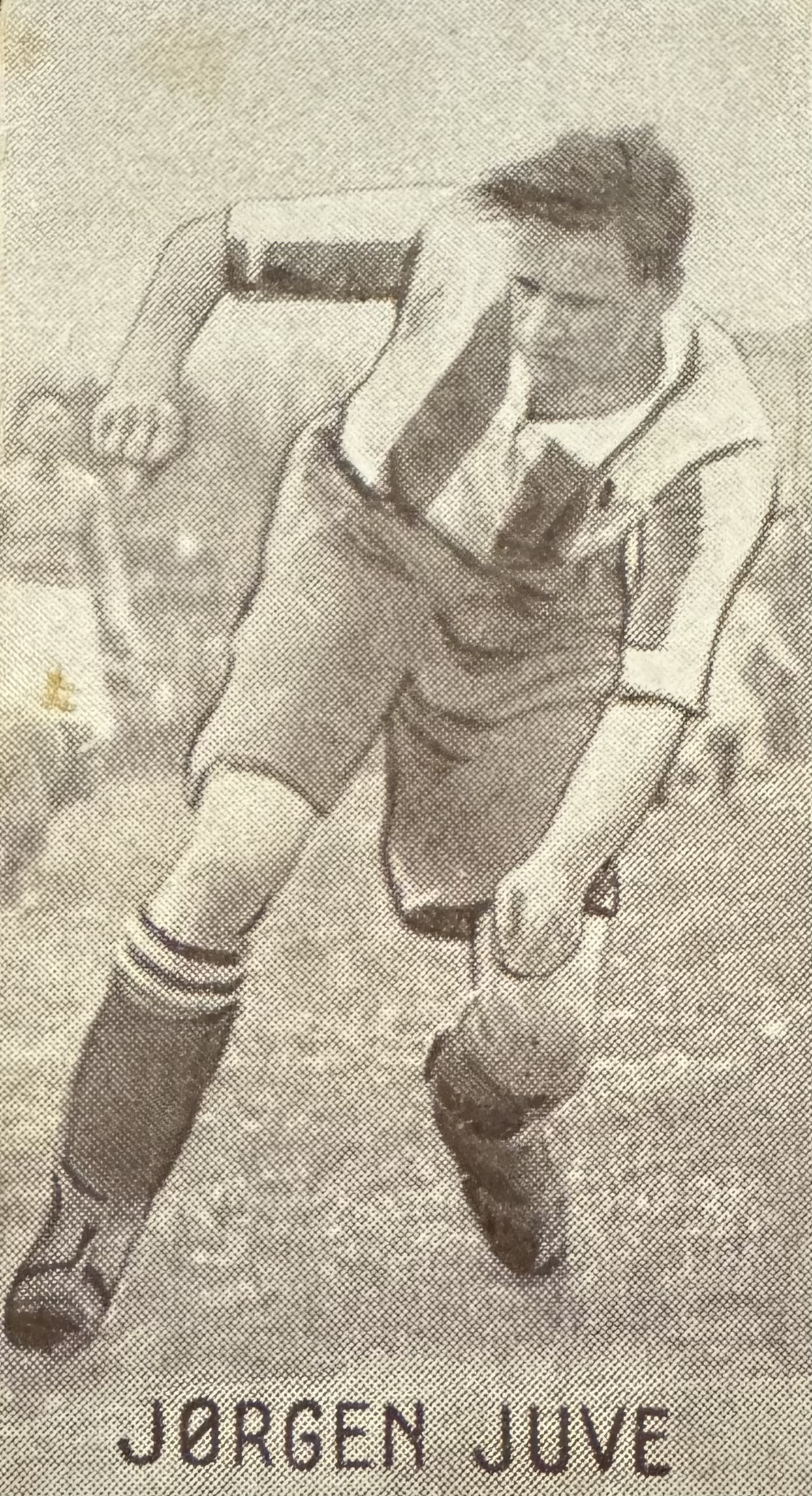
- Position: Striker
Senior career*
Years	Team	Apps	(Gls)
1923–1926	Urædd		
1926–1930	Lyn		
1930–1931	Basel	12	(10)
1931–1938	Lyn		
International career
1928–1937	Norway	45	(33)
Managerial career
- 1939: Bodø/Glimt
- 1948: Molde
Medal record
Men's Football
Representing Norway
Summer Olympic Games
Bronze medal – third place	1936 Berlin	Team
Nordic Football Championship
Winner	1929–32	Team
Third place	1933–36	Team
- * Club domestic league appearances and goals

Jørgen Juve (22 November 1906 – 12 April 1983) was a Norwegian football player, jurist, journalist, and non-fiction writer. For most of his career, he played as a striker for Lyn. He also played for a season at Basel in Switzerland before retiring and earned a total of 45 caps for the Norway national team. He is the second highest-scoring player ever for Norway, with 33 goals in just 45 games, holding the record for most international goals in Norway from 1932 until 2024, when Erling Haaland surpassed his record. He was captain of the Norway team which won Olympic bronze medals in the 1936 Summer Olympics. He also had a career as a journalist for Dagbladet and Tidens Tegn, and wrote several books.

== Personal life ==
Juve was born in Porsgrunn; the son of tanner Ole Martin Juve and Marie Pøhner. The family name originates from the farm Juve/Djuve in Laardal Municipality, where his grandfather was born. He was the eldest of six children. His two brothers both emigrated to the United States, while his three sisters married and settled in Norway. Among his childhood friends was later composer Klaus Egge. He was married twice, first to Erna Riberg in 1932, and they had two children. One of their grandchildren is folk singer Tone Juve. He was later married to the psychologist Eva Røine, and they had one daughter. He died in Oslo in 1983.

== Sports career ==
Juve started playing football for the Porsgrunn sports club Urædd, only 16 years old. In 1926 he moved to Oslo, where he started playing for the club Lyn. Juve played in the Norwegian Cup final for Lyn in 1928, but the team lost 2–1 against Ørn-Horten. During the 1930–31 season he played 12 games for FC Basel in which he scored 10 goals.

He made 45 appearances and scored 33 international goals for the Norway national team between 1928 and 1937. His first match for the national team was against Finland in June 1928, and his 45th match was against Denmark in June 1937. Juve scored his first goals for Norway in June 1929, when he scored a hat-trick against Netherlands, and during the next seven matches he scored 16 goals. His 33 goals made Juve the Norway national team all time top scorer for over 90 years, until his record was finally beaten by Erling Haaland in 2024. He only played as a striker in 22 of those games; the rest he alternated between right-back and centre-half.

He was captain of the team that won bronze medals at the 1936 Summer Olympics in Berlin. In the first round of the Olympics, 3 August, the Norwegian team met Turkey, and won the match 4–0. In the second round they met Germany, and won this match 2–0. Both goals were scored by Magnar Isaksen (after 8 and 84 minutes). Among the spectators were Hitler and Goebbels. It was the first and last time Hitler watched a football match. In the semifinal, on 10 August, the Norwegian team lost 2–1 to Italy, after extra time. Finally the team won 3–2 over Poland in the bronze final. In 2006, on the occasion of the 100-year anniversary of Juve's birth Per Ravn Omdal stated that Juve was one of the greatest Norwegian footballers while Sondre Kåfjord, Per Jorsett, Ola Dybwad Olsen and Arne Scheie named Juve as the most important contributor to Norway's only medal in an international football championship for men.

Juve retired from football in 1938, then coached Bodø/Glimt in 1939. He coached Molde FK for a few weeks in 1948.

In September 2024, Norway's anti-doping agency mistakenly included Juve and Einar Gundersen on a list of football players to be tested. The agency's communications director said, "All we can do now is admit we're wrong. We can joke about it in the office today and then review our routines going forward."

== Writing career ==
In 1931, Juve obtained a law degree in Basel, and would later work as a journalist and writer. He was sports editor for the newspaper Dagbladet from 1928 to 1934, and for Tidens Tegn from 1934 to 1940. During World War II Juve started the weekly magazine Bragd. In 1941 he moved to Stockholm, where he edited the magazine Norges-Nytt. In 1942 he travelled to London, and later to New York.

He worked as a journalist for Dagbladet from 1945. Among his books are Alt om fotball from 1934, Norsk fotball from 1937, and Øyeblikk from 1978. In Øyeblikk ("Moments") Juve describes memorable moments, such as when Birger Ruud won the men's downhill and Laila Schou Nilsen won the women's downhill at the 1936 Winter Olympics. From the football match against Germany in 1936 he reminisced on how some German players stopped playing and saluted when Hitler appeared. He edited a book on Ole Reistad in 1959. Juve was also a minor ballot candidate for the Liberal Party in the 1949 Norwegian parliamentary election.

== Career statistics ==
Appearances and goals by national team and year
National team	Year	Apps	Goals
Norway	1928	3	0
Norway	1929	5	11
Norway	1930	5	8
Norway	1931	3	2
Norway	1932	4	5
Norway	1933	6	6
Norway	1934	4	1
Norway	1935	5	0
Norway	1936	8	0
Norway	1937	2	0
Total		45	33

Scores and results list Norway's goal tally first, score column indicates score after each Juve goal.

List of international goals scored by Jørgen Juve
No.	Date	Venue	Opponent	Score	Result	Competition
1	12 June 1929	Ullevaal Stadion, Oslo, Norway	Netherlands	1–3	4–4	Friendly
2	12 June 1929	Ullevaal Stadion, Oslo, Norway	Netherlands	2–3	4–4	Friendly
3	12 June 1929	Ullevaal Stadion, Oslo, Norway	Netherlands	3–3	4–4	Friendly
4	18 June 1929	Ullevaal Stadion, Oslo, Norway	Finland	1–0	4–0	1929–32 Nordic Championship
5	18 June 1929	Ullevaal Stadion, Oslo, Norway	Finland	2–0	4–0	1929–32 Nordic Championship
6	18 June 1929	Ullevaal Stadion, Oslo, Norway	Finland	4–0	4–0	1929–32 Nordic Championship
7	23 June 1929	Københavns Idrætspark, Copenhagen, Denmark	Denmark	1–1	5–2	1929–32 Nordic Championship
8	23 June 1929	Københavns Idrætspark, Copenhagen, Denmark	Denmark	2–1	5–2	1929–32 Nordic Championship
9	29 September 1929	Ullevaal Stadion, Oslo, Norway	Sweden	1–0	2–1	1929–32 Nordic Championship
10	3 November 1929	Olympic Stadium, Amsterdam, Netherlands	Netherlands	1–0	4–1	Friendly
11	3 November 1929	Olympic Stadium, Amsterdam, Netherlands	Netherlands	2–1	4–1	Friendly
12	1 June 1930	Ullevaal Stadion, Oslo, Norway	Finland	2–0	6–2	1929–32 Nordic Championship
13	1 June 1930	Ullevaal Stadion, Oslo, Norway	Finland	4–0	6–2	1929–32 Nordic Championship
14	1 June 1930	Ullevaal Stadion, Oslo, Norway	Finland	5–0	6–2	1929–32 Nordic Championship
15	19 June 1930	Ullevaal Stadion, Oslo, Norway	Switzerland	1–0	3–0	Friendly
16	19 June 1930	Ullevaal Stadion, Oslo, Norway	Switzerland	2–0	3–0	Friendly
17	7 July 1930	Olympic Stadium, Stockholm, Sweden	Sweden	1–2	3–6	1929–32 Nordic Championship
18	7 July 1930	Olympic Stadium, Stockholm, Sweden	Sweden	2–3	3–6	1929–32 Nordic Championship
19	7 July 1930	Olympic Stadium, Stockholm, Sweden	Sweden	3–4	3–6	1929–32 Nordic Championship
20	25 May 1931	Københavns Idrætspark, Copenhagen, Denmark	Denmark	1–0	1–3	1929–32 Nordic Championship
21	27 September 1931	Ullevaal Stadion, Oslo, Norway	Sweden	2–0	2–1	1929–32 Nordic Championship
22	5 June 1932	Ullevaal Stadion, Oslo, Norway	Estonia	1–0	3–0	Friendly
23	5 June 1932	Ullevaal Stadion, Oslo, Norway	Estonia	2–0	3–0	Friendly
24	1 July 1932	Ullevi, Gothenburg, Sweden	Sweden	1–0	4–1	1929–32 Nordic Championship
25	1 July 1932	Ullevi, Gothenburg, Sweden	Sweden	2–1	4–1	1929–32 Nordic Championship
26	25 September 1932	Ullevaal Stadion, Oslo, Norway	Denmark	1–2	1–2	1929–32 Nordic Championship
27	20 June 1933	Ullevaal Stadion, Oslo, Norway	Hungary (amateurs)	1–0	4–2	Friendly
28	20 June 1933	Ullevaal Stadion, Oslo, Norway	Hungary (amateurs)	3–1	4–2	Friendly
29	3 September 1933	Töölön Pallokenttä, Helsinki, Finland	Finland	1–0	5–1	1933–36 Nordic Championship
30	3 September 1933	Töölön Pallokenttä, Helsinki, Finland	Finland	2–1	5–1	1933–36 Nordic Championship
31	3 September 1933	Töölön Pallokenttä, Helsinki, Finland	Finland	3–1	5–1	1933–36 Nordic Championship
32	5 November 1933	Sportplatz am Gübser Damm, Magdeburg, Germany	Germany	2–2	2–2	Friendly
33	8 June 1934	Ullevaal Stadion, Oslo, Norway	Austria (amateurs)	1–0	4–0	Friendly
