= Sten Moe =

Norwegian footballer (1906-1975)

Personal information
- Date of birth: 20 March 1906
- Date of death: 27 May 1975 (aged 69)

International career
Years	Team	Apps	(Gls)
1928–1936	Norway	6	(4)

Sten Moe (20 March 1906 – 27 May 1975) was a Norwegian footballer. He played in six matches for the Norway national football team from 1928 to 1936.
