= FBK Voss =

Norwegian sports club

- Full name: Fotballklubben Voss
- Founded: 26 September 1921; 104 years ago
- Ground: Prestegardsmoen, Vossevangen
- Chairman: Bjørn Lydvo
- Manager: Bjarte Bergstrøm (women); Petter Fossmark (men)
- League: First Division (women); First division (men)
- 2012: First Division, 12th (women); Third Division / 8, 4th (men)
- Website: http://www.fbkvoss.no
Home colours	Away colours

Fotballklubben Voss is a Norwegian association football club from Vossevangen, Hordaland.

It was founded on 26 September 1921.

The women's football team currently plays in the First Division, the second tier of Norwegian football. The men's football team currently plays in the Third Division, the fourth tier of Norwegian football. In 2005 it contested a playoff to win promotion to the Second Division, but lost to Askøy FK. In 2010 it once more won its section of the Third Division, but again failed to win promotion, losing in the play-offs against Austevoll.

As the last round of 2013 finished, FBK Voss Men fell down to the Fourth Division.

== Recent history ==
=== Women's team ===
Season		Pos.	Pl.	W	D	L	GS	GA	P	Cup	Notes
2001										1st round	
2002										2nd round	
2003										1st round	
2004	2. Division	5	18	6	5	7	32	42	23	2nd round	
2005	2. Division	3	18	11	4	3	50	16	37	1st round	
2006	2. Division	2	18	15	0	3	52	19	45	2nd round	
2007	2. Division	1	18	14	2	2	63	16	44	2nd round	Promoted to 1. Division
2008	1. Division	7	18	5	5	8	14	26	20	2nd round	
2009	1. Division	10	22	5	5	12	25	38	20	2nd round	
2010	1. Division	7	22	7	7	8	28	32	28	1st round	
2011	1. Division	8	20	4	7	9	16	34	19	3rd round	
2012	1. Division	12	22	2	1	19	8	60	7	2nd round	The team ended at the bottom of the table, but avoided relegation as several other teams withdrew from the league.
2013 (in progress)	1. Division	11	18	1	4	13	13	50	7	2nd round	

=== Men's team ===
Season		Pos.	Pl.	W	D	L	GS	GA	P	Cup	Notes
2001	4. divisjon	↑ 2	22	16	2	4	73	30	50		Promoted to the 3. divisjon
2002	3. divisjon	7	22	8	7	7	43	42	31		
2003	3. divisjon	7	22	8	7	7	46	41	31	Second qualifying round	
2004	3. divisjon	7	22	9	3	10	46	50	30	First qualifying round	
2005	3. divisjon	1	22	13	8	1	52	26	47	First round	Lost playoffs for promotion
2006	3. divisjon	3	22	14	3	5	60	30	45	Second round	
2007	3. divisjon	2	22	17	1	4	82	34	52	Second qualifying round	
2008	3. divisjon	2	22	16	1	5	70	35	49	First round	
2009	3. divisjon	5	22	9	4	9	45	35	31	First qualifying round	
2010	3. divisjon	1	22	16	3	3	60	23	51	First round	Lost playoffs for promotion
2011	3. divisjon	3	26	13	5	8	56	36	44	Second qualifying round	
2012	3. divisjon	4	26	14	2	10	68	61	44	First round	
2013	3. divisjon	in progress								Second qualifying round	
