= 1977 Norwegian Football Cup =

Norgesmesterskapet i fotball for menn 1977

Tournament details
- Country: Norway
- Teams: 128 (main competition)

Final positions
- Champions: Lillestrøm (1st title)
- Runners-up: Bodø/Glimt

The 1977 Norwegian Football Cup was the 72nd edition of the Norwegian annual knockout football tournament. The Cup was won by Lillestrøm after beating Bodø/Glimt in the final on 23 October 1977 with the score 1–0. This was Lillestrøm's first Norwegian Cup title.

== Summary ==
While Third Division side Sogndal was the biggest surprise in the previous season by reaching the final, this year's surprise was Raufoss who reached the semifinal for the first time. Raufoss had eliminated the First Division sides Vålerengen, Brann and Moss, but were eliminated by Lillestrøm in the semifinal. Steinkjer, which were playing in the Second Division eliminated Rosenborg and HamKam, but lost 3–0 against Bodø/Glimt in the semifinal. This was the second consecutive year that Steinkjer reached the semifinal.

In the final, Lillestrøm won 1–0 against Bodø/Glimt, with their biggest star, Tom Lund scoring the only goal. This was Lillestrøm's fourth final, and the first time they won the Norwegian Cup.

== First round ==
| Team 1 | Score | Team 2 |
|---|---|---|
8 June 1977
| Bergsøy | 0–1 | Aalesund |
| Bryne | 7–0 | Kopervik |
| Djerv 1919 | 3–4 | Viking |
| Eid | 5–0 | Ørsta |
| Eidsvold Turn | 1–2 | Sprint/Jeløy |
| Falken | 1–0 | Hasselvika |
| Fana | 0–3 | Florvåg |
| Farsund | 0–2 | Start |
| Finstadbru | 2–2 (a.e.t.) | Kongsvinger |
| Flå | 2–3 | Rosenborg |
| Fram (Larvik) | 2–0 | Holmestrand |
| Frigg | 2–1 | Hamar |
| Faaberg | 1–2 | Folldal |
| Grand Bodø | 0–3 | Bodø/Glimt |
| Grorud | 3–0 | Lisleby |
| Grue | 2–3 | Brumunddal |
| Hald | 0–5 | Brann |
| HamKam | 1–0 | Abildsø |
| Harstad | 4–1 | Kabelvåg |
| Herd | 0–2 | Hødd |
| Jerv | 7–1 (a.e.t.) | Helgerød |
| Jevnaker | 2–3 | Jotun |
| Kirkenes | 2–6 | Norild |
| Kjelsås | 0–3 | Strømmen |
| Kristiansund | 2–1 (a.e.t.) | Clausenengen |
| Lyn | 3–0 | Hof |
| Mjølner | 0–0 (a.e.t.) | Landsås |
| Mosjøen | 2–0 | Saltdalkameratene |
| Moss | 5–0 | Eidsvold IF |
| Namsos | 2–1 | Nessegutten |
| Neset | 0–1 | Strindheim |
| Os | 1–2 | Baune |
| Ottestad | 0–3 | Raufoss |
| Pors | 1–0 | Skiold |
| Rollon | 2–1 | Molde |
| Røros | 1–2 | Brekken |
| Sander | 1–2 | Vålerengen |
| Ski | 0–0 (a.e.t.) | Sarpsborg |
| Skreia | 2–5 | Mjøndalen |
| Sparta | 0–1 | Lillestrøm |
| Stag | 1–3 (a.e.t.) | Urædd |
| Stein | 1–2 (a.e.t.) | Alta |
| Steinberg | 1–2 | Skeid |
| Steinkjer | 2–0 | Kvik (Trondheim) |
| Stord | 1–0 | Ny-Krohnborg |
| Strømsgodset | 4–2 | Kvik (Halden) |
| Stålkameratene | 0–1 | Mo |
| Sunndal | 1–0 | Stjørdals/Blink |
| Tistedalen | 2–4 | Aurskog |
| Tjølling | 0–1 | Fredrikstad |
| Tornado | 1–2 | Skarbøvik |
| Tromsø | 2–1 | Lyngen |
| Tryggkam | 1–2 | Henning |
| Tønsberg-Kameratene | 1–1 (a.e.t.) | Odd |
| Ulf | 0–2 | Klepp |
| Vardal | 1–4 | Drafn |
| Varegg | 2–1 | Odda |
| Vidar | 1–2 | Stavanger |
| Vigrestad | 0–1 (a.e.t.) | Vard |
| Vigør | 3–2 | Mandalskameratene |
| Voss | 1–4 | Sogndal |
| Østsiden | 1–0 | Larvik Turn |
| Årvoll | 2–1 | Ørn |
| Åssiden | 3–1 | Eik |
Replay: 15 June 1977
| Kongsvinger | 2–0 | Finstadbru |
| Landsås | 0–2 | Mjølner |
| Odd | 4–0 | Tønsberg-Kameratene |
| Sarpsborg | 3–1 | Ski |

== Second round ==
| Team 1 | Score | Team 2 |
|---|---|---|
22 June 1977
| Aurskog | 0–4 | Lillestrøm |
| Baune | 1–5 | Brann |
| Bodø/Glimt | 9–0 | Tromsø |
| Brekken | 1–2 | Falken |
| Brumunddal | 1–0 | Strømsgodset |
| Drafn | 1–1 (a.e.t.) | Moss |
| Florvåg | 1–0 | Stord |
| Folldal | 1–2 | HamKam |
| Fredrikstad | 1–0 | Grorud |
| Henning | 0–2 | Strindheim |
| Hødd | 2–0 | Eid |
| Jotun | 1–2 | Raufoss |
| Klepp | 1–6 | Bryne |
| Kongsvinger | 1–0 | Frigg |
| Mjølner | 2–1 | Harstad |
| Mjøndalen | 1–2 | Jerv |
| Mo | 3–0 | Mosjøen |
| Namsos | 0–5 | Steinkjer |
| Norild | 2–2 (a.e.t.) | Alta |
| Odd | 0–1 | Åssiden |
| Rosenborg | 4–1 | Sunndal |
| Skarbøvik | 1–2 | Kristiansund |
| Skeid | 2–1 | Østsiden |
| Sogndal | 8–2 | Varegg |
| Sprint/Jeløy | 1–3 | Lyn |
| Start | 4–1 | Pors |
| Strømmen | 4–1 | Sarpsborg |
| Urædd | 0–1 | Fram (Larvik) |
| Vard | 3–0 | Stavanger |
| Viking | 3–0 | Vigør |
| Vålerengen | 3–0 | Årvoll |
| Aalesund | 1–0 | Rollon |
Replay: 29 June 1977
| Alta | 2–5 | Norild |
| Moss | 6–2 | Drafn |

== Third round ==
| Team 1 | Score | Team 2 |
|---|---|---|
27 July 1977
| Moss | 6–1 | Skeid |
| Lyn | 0–3 | Start |
| Lillestrøm | 5–0 | Kongsvinger |
| HamKam | 2–1 | Brumunddal |
| Raufoss | 3–2 | Vålerengen |
| Åssiden | 0–1 | Brann |
| Fram (Larvik) | 2–2 (a.e.t.) | Fredrikstad |
| Jerv | 1–3 | Viking |
| Bryne | 4–1 | Florvåg |
| Sogndal | 1–3 | Strømmen |
| Aalesund | 1–2 | Vard |
| Kristiansund | 1–0 | Hødd |
| Falken | 0–2 | Rosenborg |
| Steinkjer | 2–0 | Mo |
| Norild | 0–1 (a.e.t.) | Bodø/Glimt |
28 July 1977
| Strindheim | 1–0 | Mjølner |
Replay: 4 August 1977
| Fredrikstad | 4–2 | Fram (Larvik) |

== Fourth round ==
| Team 1 | Score | Team 2 |
|---|---|---|
31 August 1977
| Fredrikstad | 2–3 | Lillestrøm |
| Strømmen | 1–1 (a.e.t.) | Moss |
| Start | 2–1 | Kristiansund |
| Viking | 1–2 | HamKam |
| Vard | 0–1 | Bryne |
| Brann | 1–2 | Raufoss |
| Rosenborg | 0–1 | Steinkjer |
| Bodø/Glimt | 1–0 | Strindheim |
Replay: 13 September 1977
| Moss | 3–1 | Strømmen |

== Quarter-finals ==
21 September 1977

| Lillestrøm | 3–0 | Start |
|---|---|---|
| Lønstad 11'; Grønlund 57'; L. Hansen 89' |

Åråsen Stadion, Lillestrøm
Attendance: 4,300
Referee: Rolf Haugen

21 September 1977

| Raufoss | 1–1 (a.e.t.) | Moss |
|---|---|---|
| Balke 19' | | Thunheim 85' |

Raufoss Stadion, Raufoss
Attendance: c. 2,800
Referee: Jan Erik Olsen

21 September 1977

| Bryne | 1–3 | Bodø/Glimt |
|---|---|---|
| Høyland 42' | | Hansen 1'; Andreassen 62', 85' |

Bryne Stadion, Bryne
Attendance: 5,308
Referee: Reidar Bjørnerstad

21 September 1977

| Steinkjer | 2–0 | HamKam |
|---|---|---|
| Thun 6'; Austmo 23' |

Guldbergaunet Stadion, Steinkjer
Attendance: 6,500
Referee: Ivar Fredriksen

=== Replay ===
28 September 1977

| Moss | 2–2 (a.e.t.) | Raufoss |
|---|---|---|
| Ødegaard 82'; Henriksen 102' | | Kollshaugen 11'; Strand 103' |

Melløs Stadion, Moss
Attendance: 2,430
Referee: Jan Blester

=== Second replay ===
4 October 1977

| Raufoss | 2–1 (a.e.t.) | Moss |
|---|---|---|
| Pettersen 48'; Kollshaugen 117' | | Gjestrumbakken 72' |

Ullevaal Stadion, Oslo
Attendance: 2,041
Referee: Egil Bergstad

== Semi-finals ==
5 October 1977

| Bodø/Glimt | 3–0 | Steinkjer |
|---|---|---|
| Andreassen 26', 81'; Hanssen 57' |

Aspmyra Stadion, Bodø
Attendance: 8,155
Referee: Odd Johanessen

12 October 1977

| Raufoss | 1–3 | Lillestrøm |
|---|---|---|
| Balke 63' | | Lønstad 6'; Olsen 20'; Lund 36' |

Raufoss Stadion, Raufoss
Attendance: c. 6,000
Referee: Kaare Lindboe

== Final ==
23 October 1977
13:15 CET (UTC+1)

| Lillestrøm | 1–0 | Bodø/Glimt |
|---|---|---|
| Lund 76' | Report |

Ullevaal Stadion, Oslo
Attendance: 22,648
Referee: Rolf Haugen (Lillehammer)

Lillestrøm:
| Arne Amundsen |
| Rune Hansen |
| Jan Birkelund |
| Tore Kordahl |
| Georg Hammer | (substituted off) 78' |
| Tor Egil Johansen |
| Frank Grønlund |
| Gunnar Lønstad |
| Terje Olsen |
| Tom Lund |
| Erik Karlsen |
Substitutes:
| Leif Hansen | (substituted on) 78' |
| Frank Tømmervåg |
| Per Brogeland |
Coach:
Joe Hooley

Bodø/Glimt:
| Jon Abrahamsen |
| Gunnar S. Haare |
| Truls Klausen |
| Ernst Pedersen |
| Arnfinn Helgesen |
| Arild Olsen |
| Harald Berg |
| Anders Farstad | (substituted off) 80' |
| Ove Andreassen |
| Arne Hanssen |
| Jakob Klette | (substituted off) 80' |
Substitutes:
| Trond Tidemann | (substituted on) 80' |
| Terje Mørkved | (substituted on) 80' |
