= 1981 Norwegian Football Cup =

Norgesmesterskapet i fotball for herrer

Tournament details
- Country: Norway
- Teams: 128 (main competition)

Final positions
- Champions: Lillestrøm (3rd title)
- Runners-up: Moss

The 1981 Norwegian Football Cup was the 76th edition of the Norwegian annual knockout football tournament. The Cup was won by Lillestrøm after beating Moss in the cup final with the score 3–1. This was Lillestrøm's third Norwegian Cup title.

== First round ==
Team 1	Score	Team 2
26 May 1981
Donn	2–4 (a.e.t.)	Vidar
Ørn-Horten	8–0	Birkebeineren
Kongsvinger	3–1	Vaaler
27 May 1981
Cartherud	0–2	Skeid
Verdal	0–1	Nessegutten
Steinkjer	7–1	Freidig
Clausenengen	0–0 (a.e.t.)	Kristiansund
Stord	1–3	Vard Haugesund
Kopervik	3–1	Åkra
Ulf	0–1	Ålgård
Fana	0–1 (a.e.t.)	Ny-Krohnborg
Lyngdal	1–10	Start
Landsås	2–3	Bodø/Glimt
Varegg	3–0	Sandviken
Lærdal	1–6	Sogndal
Flå	2–3	Strindheim
Fram Skatval	3–2	Stjørdals/Blink
28 May 1981
Strømmen	7–0	Øvrevoll
Sander	1–2	Bærum
Stabæk	4–1	Vang
Vinstra	1–2	Raufoss
Faaberg	0–6	HamKam
Bjørkelangen	2–3	Lyn
Kjelsås	2–1	Østsiden
Vålerengen	3–1	Sandaker
Frigg	2–1	Sprint/Jeløy
Pors	3–1	Flint
Stavanger	1–3	Bryne
Lisleby	3–0	Fram Larvik
Larvik Turn	4–2	Hvittingfoss
Skreia	2–3	Sarpsborg
Velledalen/Ringen	0–2	Molde
Træff	1–2	Sunndal
Borgen	0–0 (a.e.t.)	Eidsvold Turn
Røros	0–1	Brekken
Baune	0–4	Brann
Os	3–0	Hald
Haugar	4–0	Nord
Lørenskog	0–2	Lillestrøm
Jerv	1–4 (a.e.t.)	Teie
Namsos	2–4	Mosjøen
Tromsdalen	0–3 (a.e.t.)	Harstad
Skjervøy	0–0 (a.e.t.)	Tromsø
Skotterud	0–7	Moss
Brumunddal	3–3 (a.e.t.)	Strømsgodset
Mjølner	7–1	Saltdalkameratene
Stålkameratene	0–0 (a.e.t.)	Mo
Aalesund	2–0	Tornado
Sandane	0–1	Eid
Bergsøy	2–4	Hødd
Åndalsnes	1–0	Hareid
Kvinesdal	4–2 (a.e.t.)	Vigør
Rosenborg	3–0	Vestbyen
Aurskog	0–2	Fredrikstad
Sola	0–2	Viking
Ørsta	0–2	Skarbøvik
Polarstjernen	2–6	Øksfjord
2 June 1981
Andenes	0–0 (a.e.t.)	Svolvær
3 June 1981
Kvik Halden	2–1	Kolbotn
Kongsberg	0–3	Odd
4 June 1981
Mjøndalen	4–1 (a.e.t.)	Herkules
Eik-Tønsberg	5–0	Brevik
10 June 1981
Snøgg	2–1	Tjølling
Jevnaker	1–3	Åssiden
Replay: 4 June 1981
Eidsvold Turn	1–0	Borgen
Replay: 8 June 1981
Svolvær	1–0	Andenes
Replay: 10 June 1981
Tromsø	0–1	Skjervøy
Strømsgodset	3–1	Brumunddal
Kristiansund	3–0	Clausenengen
Replay: 11 June 1981
Mo	5–2 (a.e.t.)	Stålkameratene

== Second round ==
Team 1	Score	Team 2
23 June 1981
Lisleby	2–6	Vålerengen
Eid	0–1 (a.e.t.)	Skarbøvik
24 June 1981
Sunndal	0–3	Kristiansund
Hødd	3–0	Åndalsnes
Kjelsås	0–1 (a.e.t.)	Lyn
Eik-Tønsberg	1–2	Frigg
Odd	3–0	Kvik Halden
Mosjøen	2–2 (a.e.t.)	Steinkjer
Vard Haugesund	4–4 (a.e.t.)	Varegg
Ny-Krohnborg	1–2	Kopervik
Bryne	4–0	Kvinesdal
Molde	0–0 (a.e.t.)	Aalesund
Strindheim	1–0	Mo
Raufoss	0–1	Strømmen
Lillestrøm	5–0	Snøgg
Brekken	0–1	Rosenborg
Harstad	3–0	Skjervøy
Sogndal	3–0	Mjøndalen
Brann	3–0	Os
Skeid	1–1 (a.e.t.)	Bærum
Start	6–2	Larvik Turn
Moss	5–1	Eidsvold Turn
Sarpsborg	3–2	Ørn-Horten
Fredrikstad	2–0	Stabæk
Vidar	0–2	Haugar
Ålgård	2–3 (a.e.t.)	Viking
Fram Skatval	0–0 (a.e.t.)	Nessegutten
Strømsgodset	1–1 (a.e.t.)	Kongsvinger
HamKam	4–1	Åssiden
Øksfjord	1–2	Mjølner
Bodø/Glimt	2–2 (a.e.t.)	Svolvær
25 June 1981
Teie	1–3	Pors
Replay: 1 July 1981
Steinkjer	2–0	Mosjøen
Nessegutten	0–1	Fram Skatval
Kongsvinger	2–0	Strømsgodset
Replay: 2 July 1981
Bærum	5–2	Skeid
Varegg	2–3 (a.e.t.)	Vard Haugesund
Replay: 8 July 1981
Svolvær	1–4	Bodø/Glimt
Aalesund	2–3	Molde

== Third round ==
Team 1	Score	Team 2
8 July 1981
Vålerengen	6–0	Odd
9 July 1981
Skarbøvik	0–1	Haugar
Kopervik	1–3	Bryne
Strømmen	0–2	Lillestrøm
Viking	5–1	Fram Skatval
Bærum	0–2	Start
Lyn	2–1	Frigg
Kongsvinger	0–2	HamKam
Pors	1–2	Moss
Steinkjer	5–1 (a.e.t.)	Vard Haugesund
Kristiansund	0–2	Hødd
Rosenborg	7–0	Harstad
Sogndal	3–4 (a.e.t.)	Brann
Sarpsborg	4–6 (a.e.t.)	Fredrikstad
12 July 1981
Mjølner	2–1 (a.e.t.)	Bodø/Glimt
Molde	4–2	Strindheim

== Fourth round ==
5 August 1981

Vålerengen	5–1	Steinkjer
T. Jacobsen 31'; P. Jacobsen 41', 80'; Haugen 74'; Moen 84'		Ertsås 21'

Bislett Stadion, Oslo
Attendance: 5,628
Referee: Thorodd Presberg

5 August 1981

Haugar	1–2	Viking
Føleide 72'		Svendsen 73'; Risanger 76'

Sakkestadbanen, Haugesund
Attendance: 2,878
Referee: Reidar Bjørnestad

5 August 1981

HamKam	1–0	Mjølner
Skjønsberg 65'

Briskeby gressbane, Hamar
Attendance: 2,144
Referee: Rolf Nyhus

5 August 1981

Moss	6–0	Fredrikstad
Breivik 25'; Kollshaugen 27' (pen.), 75' (pen.), 89'; Henriksen 67'; Heliasz 81'

Melløs Stadion, Moss
Attendance: 8,902
Referee: Kaare Lindboe

5 August 1981

Hødd	2–0	Lyn
Sundal 3', 86'

Høddvoll Stadion, Ulsteinvik
Attendance: 2,500
Referee: Einar Halle

5 August 1981

Lillestrøm	4–2 (a.e.t.)	Rosenborg
Eilertsen 31'; Grønlund 49'; Solér 109'; Lund 118'		Iversen 38', 58'

Åråsen Stadion, Lillestrøm
Attendance: 7,110
Referee: Henry Øberg

5 August 1981

Brann	0–0 (a.e.t.)	Start

Brann Stadion, Bergen
Attendance: 4,780
Referee: Trygve Ringen

5 August 1981

Bryne	4–2 (a.e.t.)	Molde
Hellvik 18'; Fjeldstad 52'; Mæland 95'; Mellomstrand 97'		Engstrøm 40' (o.g.); Aase 54'

Bryne Stadion, Bryne
Attendance: 1,825
Referee: Per Arne Larsgård

=== Replay ===
20 August 1981

Start	3–1	Brann
Mathisen 21'; Thunberg 36'; Ljosdal 67'		Møller 22'

Kristiansand Stadion, Kristiansand
Attendance: 4,170
Referee: Ivar Fredriksen

== Quarter-finals ==
30 August 1981

Hødd	1–2	Vålerengen
Ringstad 17'		Foss 61'; Jacobsen 75'

Høddvoll Stadion, Ulsteinvik
Attendance: c. 6,500
Referee: Thorbjørn Aass

30 August 1981

Bryne	0–1	Lillestrøm
		Skjåstad 65'

Bryne Stadion, Bryne
Attendance: 5,506
Referee: Roald Håvåg

30 August 1981

Start	0–3	Moss
		Pettersen 37'; Henæs 76'; Kollshaugen 88'

Kristiansand Stadion, Kristiansand
Attendance: 5,751
Referee: Jan Erik Olsen

30 August 1981

Viking	1–0	HamKam
Hammer 90'

Stavanger Stadion, Stavanger
Attendance: 7,500
Referee: Frank Skadal

== Semi-finals ==
20 September 1981

Vålerengen	0–2	Lillestrøm
		Grønlund 57'; Krogsæter 60'

Bislett Stadion, Oslo
Attendance: 10,697
Referee: Einar Halle

20 September 1981

Moss	2–0	Viking
Henæs 48'; Henriksen 70'

Melløs Stadion, Moss
Attendance: 6,395
Referee: Ivar Fredriksen

== Final ==
25 October 1981
13:15 CET (UTC+1)

Lillestrøm	3–1	Moss
Krogsæter 16'; Lund 32' (pen.); Lønstad 49'	Report	Kollshaugen 89'

Ullevaal Stadion, Oslo
Attendance: 22,895
Referee: Jan Erik Olsen (Drammens BK)
