= 1980 Norwegian Football Cup final =

- Event: 1980 Norwegian Football Cup
Vålerengen	Lillestrøm
4	1
- Date: 26 October 1980
- Venue: Ullevaal Stadion, Oslo
- Referee: Einar Halle
- Attendance: 23,000

The 1980 Norwegian Football Cup final was the final match of the 1980 Norwegian Football Cup, the 75th season of the Norwegian Football Cup, the premier Norwegian football cup competition organized by the Football Association of Norway (NFF). The match was played on 26 October 1980 at the Ullevaal Stadion in Oslo, and opposed two First Division sides Vålerengen and Lillestrøm. Vålerengen defeated Lillestrøm 4–1 to claim the Norwegian Cup for a first time in their history.

== Route to the final ==
Vålerengen			Round	Lillestrøm	
Skiold	5–0 (H)		Round 1	Bøn	2–0 (A)
Jevnaker	3–1 (A)		Round 2	Lisleby	8–0 (H)
Frigg	4–1 (H)		Round 3	Raufoss	4–0 (A)
Tynset	3–0 (A)		Round 4	Fram (Larvik)	4–2 (H)
Vard	3–1 (H)		Quarterfinal	Fredrikstad	3–1 aet (A)
Mo	0–0 aet (A)	2–0 (H)	Semifinal	Brann	2–1 (H)

== Match ==
=== Details ===
26 October 1980
13:15 CET (UTC+1)

Vålerengen	4–1	Lillestrøm
Haugen 34', 42'; Olsen 38' (pen.); Jacobsen 80'	Report	V. Hansen 15'

Ullevaal Stadion, Oslo
Attendance: 23,000
Referee: Einar Halle (Molde)

Vålerengen:
GK	(Norway) Tom R. Jacobsen
DF	(Norway) Petter Morstad
DF	(Norway) Ernst Pedersen
DF	(Norway) Stein Pedersen
DF	(Norway) Tor Brevik
MF	(Norway) Arnfinn Moen	(substituted off) 85'
MF	(Norway) Tom Jacobsen
MF	(Norway) Vidar Davidsen
FW	(Norway) Erik Foss
FW	(Norway) Morten Haugen	(substituted off) 77'
FW	(Norway) Terje Olsen
Substitutions:
MF	(Norway) Yngve Andersen	(substituted in) 77'
	(Norway) Stein Madsen	(substituted in) 85'
	(Norway) Lars Petter Røise
Coach:
(Norway) Leif Eriksen

Lillestrøm:
GK	(Norway) Arne Amundsen
DF	(Norway) Leif Hansen	(substituted off) 65'
DF	(Norway) Tore Kordahl
DF	(Norway) Frank Grønlund
DF	(Norway) Tor Inge Smedås
MF	(Norway) Gunnar Lønstad
MF	(Norway) Arne Erlandsen	(substituted off) 46'
AM	(Norway) Tom Lund
FW	(Norway) Erik Solér
FW	(Norway) Arne Dokken
FW	(Norway) Vidar Hansen
Substitutions
DF	(Norway) Tommy Nilsen	(substituted in) 46'
MF	(Norway) Frank Tømmervåg	(substituted in) 65'
Coach:
(Norway) Kjell Schou-Andreassen
