= Lillestrøm SK–Vålerenga Fotball rivalry =

Association football rivalry

Lillestrøm v Vålerenga
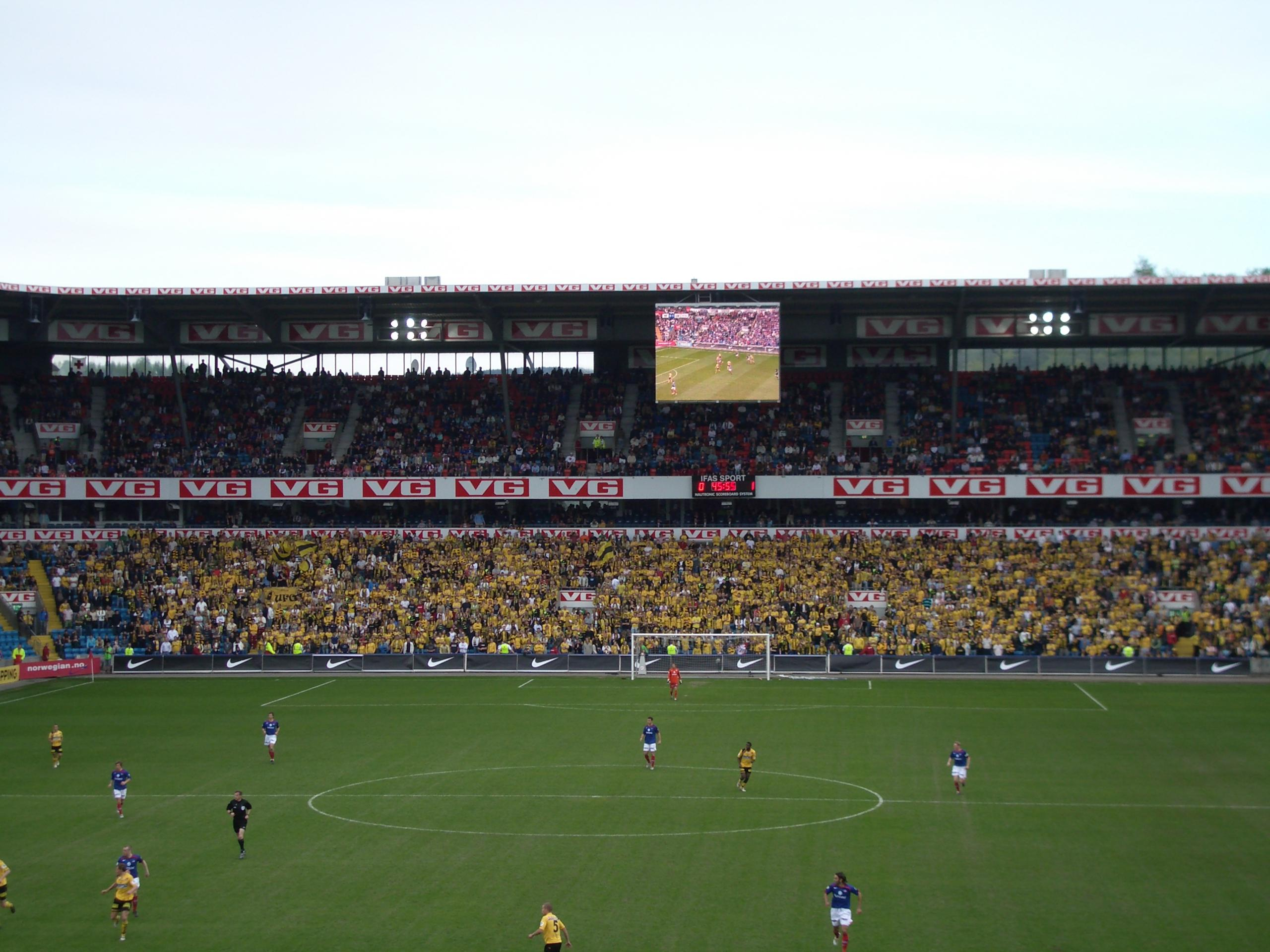
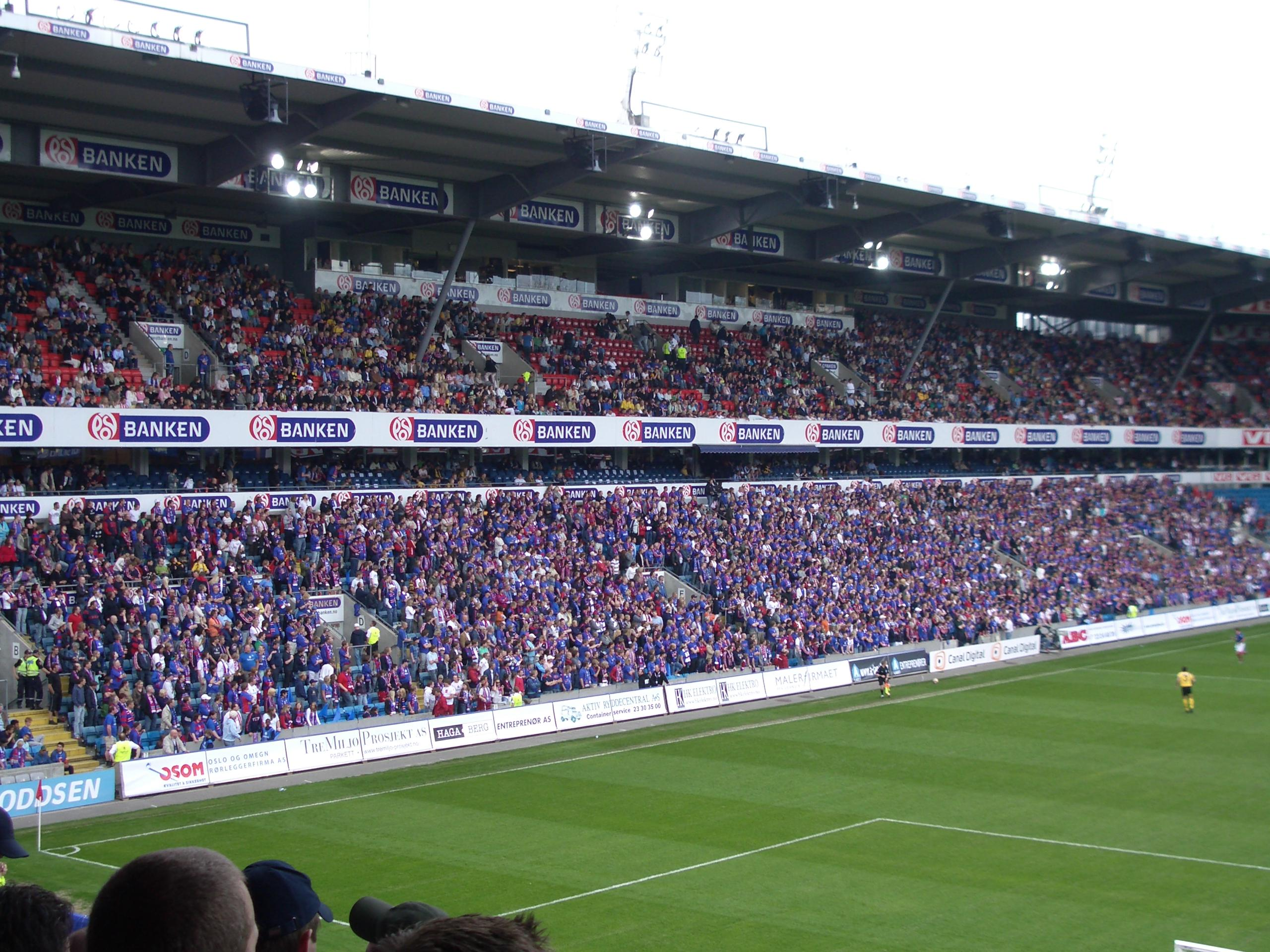
- LSK fans (top) and VIF fans (bottom) in the derby on 12 May 2006
- Location: Lillestrøm and Oslo, Norway
- Teams: Lillestrøm (LSK); Vålerenga (VIF)
- First meeting: 12 August 1923; NM Cupen; Lillestrøm 2–1 Vaalerengen
- Latest meeting: 12 September 2026; Eliteserien; Lillestrøm 2–0 Vålerenga

Statistics
- Total meetings: 105
- All-time series: Lillestrøm: 41; Drawn: 29; Vålerenga: 36
- Largest victory: VIF 0–4 LSK (1977); VIF 1–5 LSK (1998)

Location of both teams

The Lillestrøm–Vålerenga rivalry is a football rivalry in Norway between Lillestrøm SK and Vålerenga Fotball. It has been referred to as the biggest derby match in Norway. Vålerenga are located in the east of the capital of Oslo, while Lillestrøm are located just outside of the capital, in Lillestrøm municipality. Both Lillestrøm and Vålerenga are among the most successful clubs in Norwegian football, having won 11 and 9 titles respectively. They have both played over 1,000 matches in the Norwegian top division.

== History ==
The first game between the clubs took place in the first round of the 1923 cup, which Lillestrøm won 2-1 at Vigernes stadion. They met again in Norgesserien for 1938-39 season, and Hovedserien during 1950s, but played in different divisions throughout the 1960s. When Vålerenga won their first title in 1965, Lillestrøm found themselves in the second tier. In the years following their title, Vålerenga also went into a falling period, and in 1971 the two clubs met each other in the third tier. Vålerenga won the division that year, while Lillestrøm finished fourth. In 1973 Vålerenga got promoted back to the first tier, the same year as Lillestrøm got promoted to the second tier.

The rivalry between the two clubs started in the 1970s, when Lillestrøm became a prominent team in Norwegian football. Tom Lund was one of the club's most important players in these years. In 1974 Lillestrøm was promoted back to the first tier, and Vålerenga went back down to the second tier in 1975. Lillestrøm's rise to prominence also saw some of the best players from Vålerenga and other Oslo clubs move to Lillestrøm.

Vålerenga and Lillestrøm have faced each other in the cup final twice, in 1980 and 1985. In 1980, Vålerenga won 4–1. In 1985, Lillestrøm won 4–1.

In October 1999, Mamadou Diallo, who was loaned out from Lillestrøm to Vålerenga, scored two goals as Vålerenga defeated Lillestrøm 3–1. He celebrated one of the goals by running to the Lillestrøm fans and blowing a kiss in their direction. Diallo's explanation of the incident was that he wanted to show his appreciation for the LSK fans after two years at the club.

In June 2013, three days before a match between the two teams, the statue of Tom Lund outside Åråsen Stadion was beheaded. It was not the first time the statue had been vandalised. In December 2002, it was covered in paint, a Vålerenga kit and a Santa hat. Vålerenga fans had previously urinated at the statue ahead of matches between the two clubs.

== Men's football ==
=== Honours ===
Honours won by Lillestrøm and Vålerenga.

	Lillestrøm	Vålerenga
Eliteserien	5	5
Norwegian Cup	7	4
Total	12	9

=== Head-to-head ===
The head-to-head statistics shows the results between Lillestrøm and Vålerenga in the Norwegian League and Cup.
As of match played 12 September 2026

	Lillestrøm wins	Draws	Vålerenga wins
League	35	29	32
Cup	6		4
Total	41	29	36

=== List of matches ===
==== League ====
		Lillestrøm – Vålerenga				Vålerenga – Lillestrøm			
Season	Division	Date	Venue	Atten.	Score	Date	Venue	Atten.	Score
1938–39	Norgesserien	16–10–1938	Vigernes Stadion	500	2–1	04–05–1939	Frogner Stadion		3–2
1954–55	Hovedserien	11–08–1954	Åråsen Stadion	1,700	0–2	04–05–1955	Bislett Stadion	12,538	2–2
1956–57	Hovedserien	05–08–1956	Åråsen Stadion	3,000	2–0	05–05–1957	Bislett Stadion	3,220	1–2
1959–60	Hovedserien	11–10–1959	Åråsen Stadion	3,406	2–1	26–07–1959	Bislett Stadion	4,463	3–0
1971	3. divisjon	12.08.1971	Åråsen Stadion	1 500	0–0	30.04.1971	Voldsløkka	500	3–2
1975	1. divisjon	31–08–1975	Åråsen Stadion	4,375	1–3	19–05–1975	Bislett Stadion	15,514	1–1
1977	1. divisjon	03–08–1977	Åråsen Stadion	9,215	1–0	25–04–1977	Bislett Stadion	10,787	0–4
1978	1. divisjon	15–10–1978	Åråsen Stadion	12,343	1–3	22–06–1978	Bislett Stadion	7,371	1–1
1979	1. divisjon	29–04–1979	Åråsen Stadion	11,044	3–1	30–07–1979	Bislett Stadion	12,403	3–3
1980	1. divisjon	05–10–1980	Åråsen Stadion	4,941	1–0	16–06–1980	Bislett Stadion	8,870	2–2
1981	1. divisjon	10–08–1981	Åråsen Stadion	10,230	0–2	10–05–1981	Bislett Stadion	16,589	1–1
1982	1. divisjon	09–05–1982	Åråsen Stadion	7,536	0–2	15–08–1982	Bislett Stadion	12,658	1–1
1983	1. divisjon	02–10–1983	Åråsen Stadion	5,836	0–0	19–06–1983	Bislett Stadion	15,730	3–1
1984	1. divisjon	19–08–1984	Åråsen Stadion	8,215	0–2	16–05–1984	Bislett Stadion	10,485	3–0
1985	1. divisjon	16–06–1985	Åråsen Stadion	8,364	1–1	29–09–1985	Bislett Stadion	8,293	0–0
1986	1. divisjon	08–05–1986	Åråsen Stadion	5,216	3–0	18–08–1986	Bislett Stadion	6,100	0–1
1987	1. divisjon	19–09–1987	Åråsen Stadion	3,025	0–0 (Note: Lillestrøm won 6–5 on penalties.)	20–06–1987	Bislett Stadion	2,315	2–0
1988	1. divisjon	31–07–1988	Åråsen Stadion	5,912	0–1	09–05–1988	Bislett Stadion	8,156	0–0
1989	1. divisjon	30–04–1989	Åråsen Stadion	7,510	1–0	23–07–1989	Bislett Stadion	8,939	1–2
1990	Tippeligaen	19–08–1990	Åråsen Stadion	4,146	4–1	20–05–1990	Bislett Stadion	6,610	1–0
1994	Tippeligaen	27–07–1994	Åråsen Stadion	5,346	1–0	17–04–1994	Ullevaal Stadion	12,094	0–0
1995	Tippeligaen	16–07–1995	Åråsen Stadion	6,686	1–3	02–07–1995	Ullevaal Stadion	10,638	0–0
1996	Tippeligaen	14–04–1996	Åråsen Stadion	10,532	2–0	03–07–1996	Ullevaal Stadion	6,592	2–1
1998	Tippeligaen	27–04–1998	Åråsen Stadion	7,008	3–2	02–08–1998	Bislett Stadion	7,446	1–5
1999	Tippeligaen	16–06–1999	Åråsen Stadion	5,007	4–1	03–10–1999	Bislett Stadion	6,658	3–1
2000	Tippeligaen	27–08–2000	Åråsen Stadion	9,054	2–1	13–05–2000	Ullevaal Stadion	10,199	0–1
2002	Tippeligaen	16–05–2002	Åråsen Stadion	13,652	1–1	02–09–2002	Ullevaal Stadion	12,107	1–1
2003	Tippeligaen	01–09–2003	Åråsen Stadion	10,412	0–0	16–05–2003	Ullevaal Stadion	18,241	1–1
2004	Tippeligaen	16–05–2004	Åråsen Stadion	11,858	0–1	29–08–2004	Ullevaal Stadion	14,123	2–0
2005	Tippeligaen	22–05–2005	Åråsen Stadion	11,403	2–1	18–09–2005	Ullevaal Stadion	16,504	0–0
2006	Tippeligaen	18–09–2006	Åråsen Stadion	11,610	2–1	12–05–2006	Ullevaal Stadion	20,643	0–1
2007	Tippeligaen	17–06–2007	Åråsen Stadion	11,437	0–1	07–10–2007	Ullevaal Stadion	16,547	1–3
2008	Tippeligaen	13–04–2008	Åråsen Stadion	11,460	0–3	20–10–2008	Ullevaal Stadion	12,398	3–1
2009	Tippeligaen	13–04–2009	Åråsen Stadion	10,287	1–2	16–08–2009	Ullevaal Stadion	11,622	0–1
2010	Tippeligaen	04–07–2010	Åråsen Stadion	11,022	1–4	23–10–2010	Ullevaal Stadion	17,093	2–1
2011	Tippeligaen	18–09–2011	Åråsen Stadion	8,344	0–1	17–04–2011	Ullevaal Stadion	20,012	1–1
2012	Tippeligaen	15–04–2012	Åråsen Stadion	10,239	1–1	11–11–2012	Ullevaal Stadion	12,075	1–2
2013	Tippeligaen	30–06–2013	Åråsen Stadion	9,766	0–1	25–08–2013	Ullevaal Stadion	12,200	1–1
2014	Tippeligaen	17–08–2014	Åråsen Stadion	8,667	2–1	19–05–2014	Ullevaal Stadion	11,783	2–2
2015	Tippeligaen	03–05–2015	Åråsen Stadion	9,071	1–1	27–07–2015	Ullevaal Stadion	15,661	2–0
2016	Tippeligaen	30–04–2016	Åråsen Stadion	9,085	2–0	30–10–2016	Ullevaal Stadion	19,038	1–1
2017	Eliteserien	19–08–2017	Åråsen Stadion	8,552	2–1	24–06–2017	Ullevaal Stadion	11,407	3–1
2018	Eliteserien	02–09–2018	Åråsen Stadion	10,409	0–1	26–05–2018	Intility Arena	13,527	1–0
2019	Eliteserien	26–10–2019	Åråsen Stadion	9,884	0–0	25–05–2019	Intility Arena	14,418	0–3
2021	Eliteserien	07–11–2021	Åråsen Stadion	10,504	0–0	11–07–2021	Intility Arena	6,147	2–2
2022	Eliteserien	25–05–2022	Åråsen Stadion	10,527	2–0	04–09–2022	Intility Arena	16,555	3–1
2023	Eliteserien	22–10–2023	Åråsen Stadion	10,540	2–0	01–05–2023	Intility Arena	16,556	3–4
2026	Eliteserien	12–09–2026	Åråsen Stadion	10,556	2–0	19–04–2026	Intility Arena	16,556	0–2

==== Cup ====
Season	Round	Date	Venue	Atten.	Match	Score
1923	First round	12–08–1923	Vigernes Stadion		Lillestrøm - Vaalerengen	2–1
1945	Third round	02–09–1945	Vigernes Stadion	5,132	Lillestrøm - Vålerengen	1–0
1966	Third round	04–08–1966	Ullevaal Stadion	1,150	Vålerenga – Lillestrøm	4–1
1972	Second round	22–07–1972	Åråsen Stadion	1,000	Lillestrøm - Vålerengen	2–1 aet
1980	Final	26–10–1980	Ullevaal Stadion	23,000	Vålerenga – Lillestrøm	4–1
1981	Semi-final	20–09–1981	Bislett Stadion	10,697	Vålerenga – Lillestrøm	0–2
1983	Fourth round	27–07–1983	Bislett Stadion	9,236	Vålerenga – Lillestrøm	2–0
1985	Final	20–10–1985	Ullevaal Stadion	18,500	Lillestrøm – Vålerenga	4–1
2003	Fourth round	06–08–2003	Åråsen Stadion	9,941	Lillestrøm – Vålerenga	1–1 10-11 a.p.
2005	Semi-final	21–09–2005	Åråsen Stadion	12,156	Lillestrøm – Vålerenga	2–0

=== Played for both clubs ===
Players who have played for both clubs:

- (Norway) Eivind Arnevåg
- (Norway) Petter Belsvik
- (Norway) Henning Berg
- (Norway) Thomas Berntsen
- (Norway) Tommy Berntsen
- (Norway) Lars Bohinen
- (Norway) Markus Brændsrød
- (Norway) Vidar Davidsen
- (Senegal) Mamadou Diallo
- (Finland) Otto Fredrikson
- (Norway) Rune Hansen
- (Norway) Joar Hoff
- (Norway) Anders Jacobsen
- (Norway) Henrik Kjelsrud Johansen
- (Norway) Ronny Johnsen
- (Norway) Erik Karlsen
- (Norway) Kent Karlsen
- (Sweden) Patric Karlsson
- (Norway) Ulrik Mathisen (Vålerenga youth only)
- (Norway) Runar Normann
- (Norway) Kenneth Nysæther
- (Norway) Mohamed Ofkir
- (Norway) Terje Olsen
- (Norway) Ivar Rønningen
- (Sweden) Fredrik Stoor

=== Eliteserien rankings (1963–2023) ===
The table lists the clubs' finishing positions in the top division since 1963.

P.	63	64	65	66	67	68	69	70	71	72	73	74	75	76	77	78	79	80	81	82	83	84	85	86	87	88	89	90	91	92	93	94	95	96	97	98	99	00	01	02	03	04	05	06	07	08	09	10	11	12	13	14	15	16	17	18	19	20	21	22	23
1			1											1	1				1		1	1		1			1																1																		
2																2					2		2			2						2		2					2			2						2													
3												3						3		3			3								3													3														3			
4																				4										4			4				4						4	4	4														4	4	
5				5	5												5					5							5																							5									
6		6														6																						6														6				6				6	6
7													7		7				7					7	7	7							7			7				7	7	7			7		7		7				7						7		
8	8																8	8																		8				8										8			8		8						
9																									9							9																		9											
10						10																					10	10							10											10		10			10			10			10				
11													11															11									11										11				11										
12																																						12			12					12								12	12	12					
13																																		13															13												
14																																																									14				14
15																																																													
16																																																													

== Women's football ==
=== Honours ===
Honours won by LSK and Vålerenga.

	LSK	Vålerenga
Toppserien	7	2
Norwegian Cup	6	2
Total	13	4

=== Head-to-head ===
The head-to-head statistics shows the results between Lillestrøm and Vålerenga in the Norwegian League and Cup.
As of match played 24 August 2024

	LSK wins	Draws	Vålerenga wins
League	15	5	7
Cup	3		2
Total	18	5	9

=== List of matches ===
==== League ====
		LSK – Vålerenga				Vålerenga – LSK			
Season	Division	Date	Venue	Atten.	Score	Date	Venue	Atten.	Score
2012	Toppserien	02–06–2012	LSK-Hallen		6–0	28–07–2012	Vallhall Arena		1–1
2013	Toppserien	10–08–2013	LSK-Hallen		0–0	12–05–2013	Vallhall Arena		1–3
2014	Toppserien	11–10–2014	LSK-Hallen	1,582	2–1	09–06–2014	Vallhall Arena	174	0–2
2015	Toppserien	16–05–2015	LSK-Hallen	412	4–0	09–09–2015	Vallhall Arena	321	1–4
2016	Toppserien	16–10–2016	LSK-Hallen	307	3–0	20–04–2016	Vallhall Arena	259	0–4
2017	Toppserien	24–06–2017	LSK-Hallen	240	2–1	04–11–2017	Intility Arena	174	2–5
2018	Toppserien	04–08–2018	LSK-Hallen	445	2–0	24–03–2018	Intility Arena	783	0–5
2019	Toppserien	17–08–2019	LSK-Hallen	659	2–0	05–05–2019	Intility Arena	834	1–2
2020	Toppserien	22–08–2020	LSK-Hallen	200	1–3	01–11–2020	Intility Arena	200	4–2
2021	Toppserien	14–07–2021	LSK-Hallen	230	1–1	26–09–2021	Intility Arena	521	2–1
2022	Toppserien	27–04–2022	LSK-Hallen	416	0–3	06–08–2022	Intility Arena	410	1–1
2023	Toppserien	30–06–2023	LSK-Hallen	616	2–0	03–05–2023	Intility Arena	635	4–1
2023	Toppserien					13–09–2023	Intility Arena	621	2–2
2024	Toppserien	24–08–2024	LSK-Hallen	432	0–4	10–05–2024	Intility Arena	753	1–0
2024	Toppserien					16–11–2024	Intility Arena		

==== Cup ====
Season	Round	Date	Venue	Atten.	Match	Score
2011	Third round	25–05–2011	Vallhall Arena		Vålerenga – LSK	0–2
2017	Semi-final	30–09–2017	Vallhall Arena	635	Vålerenga – LSK	1–0
2018	Fourth round	22–08–2018	LSK-Hallen	613	LSK – Vålerenga	4–1
2019	Final	23–11–2019	Telenor Arena	5,142	LSK – Vålerenga	5–1
2020	Final	13–12–2020	Ullevaal Stadion	200	LSK – Vålerenga	0–2 (a.e.t.)
