= 1980 Norwegian Football Cup =

Norgesmesterskapet i fotball for menn 1980

Tournament details
- Country: Norway
- Teams: 128 (main competition)

Final positions
- Champions: Vålerengen (1st title)
- Runners-up: Lillestrøm

The 1980 Norwegian Football Cup was the 75th edition of the Norwegian annual knockout football tournament. The Cup was won by Vålerengen after beating Lillestrøm in the cup final with the score 4–1. This was Vålerengen's first Norwegian Cup title.

== First round ==
Team 1	Score	Team 2
27 May 1980
Lillehammer	4–0	Stange
Brekken	0–2	Vinstra
28 May 1980
Fram (Skatval)	1–0	Steinkjer
Sverre	2–1	Nessegutten
Leinstrand	0–4	Strindheim
Fana	0–1 (a.e.t.)	Varegg
Jerv	3–2	Grane (Arendal)
Donn	2–4	Vigør
Lyngen	3–0	Nordreisa
Finstadbru	0–5	Strømmen
29 May 1980
Østsiden	5–1	Sander
Lisleby	2–1	Kvik (Halden)
Sparta	0–2 (a.e.t.)	Frigg
Kolbotn	0–1	Lyn
Lørenskog	2–7	Sarpsborg
Aurskog	0–2	Åssiden
Brumunddal	1–2 (a.e.t.)	Lærdal
Vang	1–4	Kongsvinger
Raufoss	5–1	Vikersund
Geithus	1–5	Mjøndalen
Snøgg	2–2 (a.e.t.)	Jevnaker
Bærum	2–1	Teie
Fram (Larvik)	2–1	Sprint/Jeløy
Odd	2–2 (a.e.t.)	Storm
Kvinesdal	0–4	Start
Ulf	1–0	Sola
Klepp	1–1 (a.e.t.)	Vigrestad
Vidar	0–5	Viking
Havørn	1–2	Bryne
Kopervik	5–1	Stavanger
Haugar	2–1	Ålgård
Solid	1–2 (a.e.t.)	Vard
Os	3–1	Arna
Hald	0–1	Ny-Krohnborg
Bjarg	0–4	Brann
Sogndal	2–3	Eid
Ørsta	2–0 (a.e.t.)	Tornado
Valder	0–1	Molde
Bergsøy	1–2	Skarbøvik
Hødd	0–1	Aalesund
Åndalsnes	1–1 (a.e.t.)	Kristiansund
Clausenengen	1–3	Sunndal
Tynset	4–1	Røros
Rosenborg	4–1	Freidig
Ranheim	1–0	Henning
Neset	0–0 (a.e.t.)	Stjørdals/Blink
Mosjøen	0–0 (a.e.t.)	Namsos
Mo	4–2	Stålkameratene
Bodø/Glimt	2–1 (a.e.t.)	Grand Bodø
Beisfjord	0–1	Mjølner
3 June 1980
Kirkenes	1–2	Alta
4 June 1980
Navestad	0–3	Eik
Grue	4–0	Sørumsand
Birkebeineren	1–3	Pors
Kabelvåg	1–3 (a.e.t.)	Tromsø
Landsås	1–0 (a.e.t.)	Harstad
5 June 1980
Ørn	1–0	Brevik
Vålerengen	5–0	Skiold
Strømsgodset	4–0	Larvik Turn
11 June 1980
Fredrikstad	3–0	Stag
Moss	13–0	Flint
Skeid	6–0	Flisa
Cartherud	1–7	HamKam
12 June 1980
Bøn	0–2	Lillestrøm
Replay: 4 June 1980
Namsos	2–1	Mosjøen
Vigrestad	1–0	Klepp
Kristiansund	3–0	Åndalsnes
Stjørdals/Blink	1–2 (a.e.t.)	Neset
Replay: 5 June 1980
Storm	1–2	Odd
Replay: 11 June 1980
Jevnaker	3–1	Snøgg

== Second round ==
Team 1	Score	Team 2
17 June 1980
Eik	1–1 (a.e.t.)	Odd
Vard	2–1	Kopervik
18 June 1980
Sarpsborg	2–0	Strømsgodset
Frigg	2–1	Ørn
Lyn	6–1	Lillehammer
Bærum	2–3	Moss
Strømmen	2–3 (a.e.t.)	Skeid
Lillestrøm	8–0	Lisleby
Kongsvinger	3–1	Grue
Vinstra	1–4	HamKam
Jevnaker	1–3	Vålerengen
Mjøndalen	2–1	Østsiden
Åssiden	1–5	Fredrikstad
Pors	0–1	Fram (Larvik)
Vigør	3–1	Start
Vigrestad	0–2	Haugar
Bryne	0–1	Jerv
Viking	4–2	Ulf
Brann	2–0	Ny-Krohnborg
Varegg	3–2	Os
Lærdal	0–1	Raufoss
Eid	4–0	Aalesund
Skarbøvik	3–0	Kristiansund
Molde	2–1	Ørsta
Sunndal	0–1	Tynset
Strindheim	2–0	Sverre
Fram (Skatval)	0–5	Rosenborg
Neset	2–0	Ranheim
Mjølner	2–0	Landsås
Tromsø	0–4	Bodø/Glimt
Alta	1–1 (a.e.t.)	Lyngen
19 June 1980
Namsos	1–3	Mo
Replay: 25 June 1980
Odd	1–0	Eik
Lyngen	0–1	Alta

== Third round ==
Team 1	Score	Team 2
3 July 1980
Fredrikstad	8–0	Odd
Skarbøvik	3–5 (a.e.t.)	Brann
Raufoss	0–4	Lillestrøm
Varegg	1–3	Viking
Skeid	0–1	Mjøndalen
Haugar	3–1 (a.e.t.)	Vigør
Tynset	3–2 (a.e.t.)	Strindheim
Moss	3–1 (a.e.t.)	Kongsvinger
Fram (Larvik)	3–2	Sarpsborg
Mo	3–0	Mjølner
Jerv	1–3	Vard
4 July 1980
HamKam	3–0	Lyn
5 July 1980
Eid	1–3	Molde
Neset	0–3	Rosenborg
6 July 1980
Bodø/Glimt	7–2	Alta
Vålerengen	4–1	Frigg

== Fourth round ==
6 August 1980

Mo	4–3	Rosenborg
Johansen 8'; Raum 17'; Falch-Olsen 29'; Sollied 87'		Iversen 34'; Sørlie 38'; Hansen 39'

Sagbakken Stadion, Mo i Rana
Attendance: 3,000
Referee: Reidar Bjørnstad

6 August 1980

Mjøndalen	2–1 (a.e.t.)	Moss
Markussen 74', 100'		Kollshaugen 35'

Nedre Eiker Stadion, Mjøndalen
Attendance: 2,708
Referee: Per Arne Larsgård

6 August 1980

Viking	2–0	HamKam
Kvia 17'; Andersen 79'

Stavanger Stadion, Stavanger
Attendance: 4,792
Referee: Sigurd Gundersen

6 August 1980

Lillestrøm	4–2	Fram (Larvik)
Grønlund 27'; Dokken 49'; Krogsæter 51'; Erlandsen 65' (pen.)		Aspaas 79'; Ayres 85'

Åråsen Stadion, Lillestrøm
Attendance: 2,100
Referee: Rolf Nyhus

6 August 1980

Brann	3–0	Bodø/Glimt
Krogh 1'; Giske 13', 33'

Brann Stadion, Bergen
Attendance: 8,283
Referee: Kaare Lindboe

6 August 1980

Molde	1–2	Fredrikstad
Hareide 74'		Olsen 2'; Ahlsen 21'

Molde Stadion, Molde
Attendance: 1,950
Referee: Roald Håvåg

6 August 1980

Tynset	0–3	Vålerengen
		Moen 32'; Haugen 43', 79'

Nytrømoen, Tynset
Attendance: 2,383
Referee: Rolf Haugen

7 August 1980

Vard	2–1	Haugar
Schanzenbecker 3', 24'		Christophersen 39'

Haugesund Stadion, Haugesund
Attendance: 6,368
Referee: Svein Inge Thime

== Quarter-finals ==
31 August 1980

Fredrikstad	1–3 (a.e.t.)	Lillestrøm
Te. Svendsen 70'		Solér 85', 100'; Dokken 94' (pen.)

Fredrikstad Stadion, Fredrikstad
Attendance: 8,064
Referee: Jan Erik Olsen

2 September 1980

Vålerengen	3–1 (a.e.t.)	Vard
Davidsen 16'; Foss 91'; Røise 119'		Aase 2'

Bislett Stadion, Oslo
Attendance: 4,785
Referee: Thorbjørn Aass

3 September 1980

Viking	1–3	Mo
Torb. Svendsen 51'		Falck-Olsen 51'; Råum 58'; Hagh 68'

Stavanger Stadion, Stavanger
Attendance: 7,900
Referee: Frank Skadal

3 September 1980

Brann	2–0	Mjøndalen
Ø. Pettersen 17', 68'

Brann Stadion, Bergen
Attendance: 10,563
Referee: Einar Halle

== Semi-finals ==
21 September 1980

Lillestrøm	2–1	Brann
Dokken 8' (pen.); Lund 20'		Strand 64'

Åråsen Stadion, Lillestrøm
Attendance: 10,394
Referee: Rolf Nyhus

21 September 1980

Mo	0–0 (a.e.t.)	Vålerengen

Sagbakken Stadion, Mo i Rana
Attendance: 8,500
Referee: Kaare Lindboe

=== Replay ===
2 October 1980

Vålerengen	2–0	Mo
Haugen 14'; Foss 18'

Bislett Stadion, Oslo
Attendance: 20,615
Referee: Henry Øberg

== Final ==
26 October 1980
13:15 CET (UTC+1)

Vålerengen	4–1	Lillestrøm
Haugen 34', 42'; Olsen 38' (pen.); Jacobsen 80'	Report	V. Hansen 15'

Ullevaal Stadion, Oslo
Attendance: 23,000
Referee: Einar Halle (Molde)
