= List of Vålerenga Fotball seasons =

This is a list of seasons played by Vålerenga Fotball in Norwegian and European football, regional and test league seasons from 1915 to 1937 and national league seasons from the 1937–38 season to the most recent completed season. It details the club's achievements in major competitions, and the top scorers for some season. The statistics is up to date as of the end of the 2023 season.

This list is under construction.

Season	League											Cup	Other competitions					Top goalscorer		Ref(s)
Season	Division (Gr.)	P	W	D	L	GF	GA	GD	Pts	Pos	Att	Cup	Other	CL	EL	ECL	CWC	Name	Goals	Ref(s)
1980	1. divisjon	22	6	8	8	26	26	0	20	8th	6,541	W	—	—	—	—	—	Morten Haugen	9	
1981	1. divisjon	22	9	11	2	44	27	+17	29	1st	10,249	SF	—	—	—	—	1R	Pål Jacobsen	16	
1982	1. divisjon	22	10	4	8	35	21	+14	24	4th	7,591	3R	—	PR	—	—	—	Pål Jacobsen	8	
1983	1. divisjon	22	12	7	3	38	17	+21	31	1st	9,500	2nd	—	—	—	—	—	Pål Jacobsen	10	
1984	1. divisjon	22	13	6	3	40	14	+26	32	1st	5,488	3R	—	1R	—	—	—	Vidar Davidsen	9	
1985	1. divisjon	22	9	6	7	44	31	+13	24	3rd	4,461	2nd	—	1R	—	—	—	Jørn Andersen	23	
1986	1. divisjon	22	9	4	9	29	28	+1	22	7th	2,977	4R	—	—	1R	—	—	Paal Fredheim	8	
1987	1. divisjon	22	8	5	9	26	27	−1	30	7th	2,546	2R	—	—	—	—	—			
1988	1. divisjon	22	8	6	8	26	32	−6	30	7th	3,677	QF	—	—	—	—	—	Eivind Arnevåg	9	
1989	1. divisjon	22	7	2	13	29	52	−23	23	10th	3,758	4R	—	—	—	—	—	Eivind Arnevåg	7	
1990	Tippeligaen	22	4	4	14	26	53	−27	16	↓ 11th	3,484	3R	—	—	—	—	—	Are Christensen	5	
1991	1. divisjon (A)	22	13	1	8	31	26	+5	40	3rd	—	3R	—	—	—	—	—	Are Christensen	10	
1992	1. divisjon (A)	22	9	2	11	30	39	−9	29	9th	—	4R	—	—	—	—	—	Terje Joelsen	8	
1993	1. divisjon (A)	22	13	4	5	52	29	+23	43	↑ 1st	—	4R	—	—	—	—	—	Espen Haug	16	
1994	Tippeligaen	22	5	7	10	32	40	−8	22	9th	5,905	4R	—	—	—	—	—	Knut Aga jr.	8	
1995	Tippeligaen	26	11	6	9	47	44	+3	37	7th	6,464	2R	—	—	—	—	—	Kenneth Nysæther	10	
1996	Tippeligaen	26	6	9	11	30	40	−10	27	↓ 13th	6,204	SF	—	—	—	—	—	Espen Musæus	8	
1997	1. divisjon	26	19	3	4	70	21	+49	60	↑ 1st	—	W	—	—	—	—	—	Espen Musæus	16	
1998	Tippeligaen	26	10	3	13	44	48	−4	33	7th	7,865	3R	—	—	—	—	QF	John Carew; Kjell Roar Kaasa	7	
1999	Tippeligaen	26	8	4	14	40	53	−13	28	11th	6,626	4R	—	—	—	—	—	Pascal Simpson	8	
2000	Tippeligaen	26	5	9	12	32	44	−12	24	↓ 12th	7,630	QF	—	—	—	—	—	Kjetil Rekdal	6	
2001	1. divisjon	30	19	8	3	71	29	+42	62	↑ 1st	—	QF	—	—	—	—	—	Kjetil Rekdal	11	
2002	Tippeligaen	26	7	12	7	38	31	+7	33	8th	8,782	W	—	—	—	—	—	David Hanssen	7	
2003	Tippeligaen	26	6	10	10	30	33	−3	28	12th	9,336	QF	—	—	3R	—	—	Freddy dos Santos	10	
2004	Tippeligaen	26	13	9	4	40	22	+18	48	2nd	14,392	3R	2GS	—	—	—	—	Freddy dos Santos	8	
2005	Tippeligaen	26	13	7	6	40	27	+13	46	1st	15,658	SF	QF	3QR	1R	—	—	Morten Berre	9	
2006	Tippeligaen	26	13	5	8	43	28	+15	44	3rd	13,873	QF	QF	2QR	—	—	—	Jan-Derek Sørensen	9	
2007	Tippeligaen	26	10	6	10	34	34	0	36	7th	13,837	4R	—	—	1R	—	—	Morten Berre	9	
2008	Tippeligaen	26	8	6	12	31	37	−6	30	10th	12,700	W	—	—	—	—	—	Mohammed Abdellaoue	9	
2009	Tippeligaen	30	12	4	14	47	50	−3	40	7th	10,788	SF	—	—	3QR	—	—	Bengt Sæternes	11	
2010	Tippeligaen	30	19	4	7	69	36	+33	61	2nd	13,646	2R	—	—	—	—	—	Mohammed Abdellaoue	15	
2011	Tippeligaen	30	14	5	11	42	33	+9	47	7th	13,331	2R	—	—	3QR	—	—	Bojan Zajić	8	
2012	Tippeligaen	30	12	5	13	42	44	−2	41	8th	10,768	3R	—	—	—	—	—	Marcus Pedersen	8	
2013	Tippeligaen	30	10	6	14	41	50	−9	36	11th	9,900	QF	—	—	—	—	—	Morten Berre	10	
2014	Tippeligaen	30	11	9	10	59	53	+6	42	6th	9,751	4R	—	—	—	—	—	Viðar Örn Kjartansson	25	
2015	Tippeligaen	30	14	7	9	49	41	+8	49	7th	10,099	2R	—	—	—	—	—	Daniel Fredheim Holm; Deshorn Brown; Ghayas Zahid	7	
2016	Tippeligaen	30	10	8	12	41	39	+2	38	10th	9,074	QF	—	—	—	—	—	Ghayas Zahid	8	
2017	Eliteserien	30	11	6	13	48	46	+2	39	8th	9,703	SF	—	—	—	—	—	Herman Stengel	6	
2018	Eliteserien	30	11	9	10	39	44	−5	42	6th	9,500	QF	—	—	—	—	—	Sam Johnson	11	
2019	Eliteserien	30	8	10	12	39	44	−5	34	10th	9,500	R3	—	—	—	—	—	Bård Finne	8	
2020	Eliteserien	30	15	10	5	51	33	+18	55	3rd	200	Cancelled	—	—	—	—	—	Viðar Örn Kjartansson	9	
2021	Eliteserien	30	11	12	7	46	37	+9	45	7th	4,318	3R	—	—	—	2QR	—	Aron Dønnum; Henrik Udahl	6	
2022	Eliteserien	30	13	5	12	52	49	+3	44	6th	4,318	3R	—	—	—	—	—	Amor Layouni	8	
2023	Eliteserien	30	7	8	15	39	50	-11	29	↓ 14th	10,542	SF	—	—	—	—	—	Andrej Ilić	9	
2024	OBOS-ligaen	30	21	6	3	82	31	+51	69	↑ 1st	10,542	QF	—	—	—	—	—	Jones El-Abdellaoui; Mees Rijks	13	
