= 1983 Norwegian Football Cup =

Norgesmesterskapet i fotball for herrer

Tournament details
- Country: Norway
- Teams: 128 (main competition)

Final positions
- Champions: Moss (1st title)
- Runners-up: Vålerengen

The 1983 Norwegian Football Cup was the 78th edition of the Norwegian annual knockout football tournament. The Cup was won by Moss after beating Vålerengen in the cup final with the score 2–0. This was Moss's first Norwegian Cup title.

== First round ==
Team 1	Score	Team 2
20 May 1983
Sola	0–0 (a.e.t.)	Djerv 1919
25 May 1983
Jevnaker	4–3 (a.e.t.)	Eidsvold Turn
Jerv	8–3	Grane (Arendal)
Mjølner	3–2	Grand Bodø
Hødd	6–1	Spjelkavik
Nybergsund	2–0	Brumunddal
Halsnøy	0–3	Sandviken
Fredrikstad	3–0	Kjelsås
Vard Haugesund	2–1	Ålgård
Røros	3–0	Alvdal
Faaberg	1–4 (a.e.t.)	Strømmen
Lisleby	5–1	Frigg
Sørumsand	5–1	Asker
Stranda	1–1 (a.e.t.)	Aalesund
Sunndal	5–1	Åndalsnes
Hafslund	2–5	Kvik Halden
Østsiden	1–0	Bærum
Molde	3–0	Clausenengen
Strindheim	2–1	Falken
Langevåg	2–1	Hareid
Nidelv	0–2	Nessegutten
Bergsøy	0–1	Skarbøvik
Mosjøen	0–3	Mo
Bodø/Glimt	2–1	Fauske/Sprint
Kopervik	1–6	Ulf
Start	1–0	Vigør
Kautokeino	2–1	Alta
26 May 1983
Ny-Krohnborg	2–1	Os
Brann	3–0	Fyllingen
Skeid	1–2	Sarpsborg
Rjukan	2–8	Mjøndalen
Storm	2–3	Pors
Råde	0–2	Drammens BK
Sandefjord BK	0–2	Strømsgodset
Tønsberg-Kameratene	1–5	Moss
Orkdal	4–1	Verdal
Rosenborg	5–0	Charlottenlund
Gjøvik-Lyn	3–1	Jotun
Sogndal	2–0	Dale (Sunnfjord)
Tornado	3–0	Ørsta
Funnefoss/Vormsund	0–1	Kongsvinger
Drafn	1–3	Lyn
Raufoss	3–2 (a.e.t.)	Abildsø
Figgjo	1–4	Bryne
Sprint/Jeløy	2–5	Ørn-Horten
Vang	0–5	HamKam
Tromsø	0–2	Lyngen
Skjervøy	0–1	Kåfjord
Landsås	1–3	Harstad
Fram Larvik	0–2	Eik-Tønsberg
Oppsal	2–3	Vålerengen
Lillehammer	2–0	Tynset
Stag	1–3 (a.e.t.)	Teie
Lillestrøm	5–1	Skotterud
Manglerud/Star	1–0	Åssiden
Bryn	0–4	Kristiansund
Tranabakkan	2–4	Steinkjer
Stjørdals/Blink	2–0	Leksvik
Sandnessjøen	2–1	Stålkameratene
Egersund	0–1	Haugar
Fana	0–2	Varegg
Viking	13–0	Buøy
Odd	1–0	Tjølling
1 June 1983
Lyngdal	1–3	Vidar
Replay: 2 June 1983
Djerv 1919	4–2	Sola
Aalesund	1–2	Stranda

== Second round ==
Team 1	Score	Team 2
7 June 1983
Orkdal	0–4	Rosenborg
Strømmen	1–1 (a.e.t.)	Lisleby
Ulf	2–3 (a.e.t.)	Viking
8 June 1983
Vidar	7–0	Jerv
Sarpsborg	1–1 (a.e.t.)	Mjøndalen
Pors	3–0	Jevnaker
Moss	6–0	Østsiden
Mjølner	7–0	Kautokeino
Tornado	1–1 (a.e.t.)	Hødd
Kongsvinger	4–0	Nybergsund
Lyn	4–2	Raufoss
Sandviken	0–1	Vard Haugesund
Bryne	4–1	Djerv 1919
HamKam	4–0	Røros
Lyngen	0–2	Kåfjord
Mo	2–1	Harstad
Eik-Tønsberg	2–0	Sørumsand
Stranda	2–0	Sunndal
Vålerengen	6–0	Lillehammer
Teie	0–4	Lillestrøm
Kvik Halden	3–0	Manglerud/Star
Kristiansund	2–1	Molde
Strindheim	4–0	Langevåg
Nessegutten	2–3	Steinkjer
Skarbøvik	3–1	Stjørdals/Blink
Sandnessjøen	0–0 (a.e.t.)	Bodø/Glimt
Odd	2–1	Start
9 June 1983
Ny-Krohnborg	1–2	Brann
Haugar	5–1	Varegg
Drammens BK	0–3	Strømsgodset
Ørn-Horten	0–0 (a.e.t.)	Fredrikstad
Gjøvik-Lyn	1–3	Sogndal
Replay: 15 June 1983
Hødd	2–0	Tornado
Lisleby	0–1	Strømmen
Replay: 16 June 1983
Mjøndalen	3–0	Sarpsborg
Bodø/Glimt	2–1	Sandnessjøen
Replay: 21 June 1983
Fredrikstad	3–2 (a.e.t.)	Ørn-Horten

== Third round ==
Team 1	Score	Team 2
22 June 1983
Brann	2–4	Vidar
Mjøndalen	3–1	Pors
Strømsgodset	2–3	Moss
Rosenborg	2–0	Mjølner
Sogndal	4–1	Hødd
Kongsvinger	4–0	Lyn
Vard Haugesund	1–5	Bryne
Kåfjord	1–2 (a.e.t.)	Mo
Strømmen	3–1 (a.e.t.)	Eik-Tønsberg
Stranda	0–2	Vålerengen
Lillestrøm	6–2	Kvik Halden
Kristiansund	1–2	Strindheim
Steinkjer	2–0	Skarbøvik
Bodø/Glimt	0–2	Haugar
Viking	1–2	Odd
24 June 1983
Fredrikstad	1–0	HamKam

== Fourth round ==
26 July 1983

Vidar	1–2 (a.e.t.)	Mjøndalen
Fjetland 30'		Dahle 15', 93'

Stavanger Stadion, Stavanger
Attendance: 2,027
Referee: Kjell Nordby

27 July 1983

Moss	3–2	Rosenborg
Kollshaugen 24' (pen.), 53', 56'		Jenshus 8'; Moen 90'

Melløs Stadion, Moss
Attendance: 2,858
Referee: Rolf Nyhus

27 July 1983

Sogndal	1–2	Kongsvinger
Skartun 67'		Pellerud 22'; Nystuen 52'

Fosshaugane, Sogndalsfjøra
Attendance: 1,675
Referee: Kaare Lindboe

27 July 1983

Bryne	6–3	Fredrikstad
Nordheim 1'; Mæland 43', 63', 69'; Topland 74'; Herrem 88'		Andersen 23', 61'; Lund 55'

Bryne Stadion, Bryne
Attendance: 2,213
Referee: Hans O. Instefjord

27 July 1983

Mo	1–3	Strømmen
Olsen 73'		Ottesen 9'; Kallstad 10'; Karlsen 79'

Sagbakken Stadion, Mo i Rana
Attendance: c. 1,000
Referee: Jens P. Jensen

27 July 1983

Vålerengen	2–0	Lillestrøm
Bergsvand 23'; Gran 58'

Bislett Stadion, Oslo
Attendance: 9.236
Referee: Jan Erik Olsen

27 July 1983

Strindheim	1–2 (a.e.t.)	Steinkjer
Grønning 110'		Berg 101'; Vaadal 118'

Lerkendal Stadion, Trondheim
Attendance: 1,845
Referee: Einar Halle

27 July 1983

Haugar	2–1	Odd
Nilsen 21'; Osborne 29'		Stavdal 18'

Haugesund Stadion, Haugesund
Attendance: c. 1,600
Referee: Jonny Thaule

== Quarter-finals ==
24 August 1983

Mjøndalen	1–2	Moss
Markussen 15'		Henæs 60'; Halvorsen 75'

Nedre Eiker Stadion, Mjøndalen
Attendance: 2,035
Referee: Frank Skadal

24 August 1983

Kongsvinger	5–0	Bryne
Pellerud 10', 43', 81'; Hagaløkken 20', 47'

Gjemselund Stadion, Kongsvinger
Attendance: 3,148
Referee: Thorodd Presberg

24 August 1983

Strømmen	1–2	Vålerengen
Johansen 58'		Fredheim 2', 26'

Strømmen Stadion, Strømmen
Attendance: 3,593
Referee: Roald Håvåg

24 August 1983

Steinkjer	1–0 (a.e.t.)	Haugar
Johnsen 111'

Guldbergaunet Stadion, Steinkjer
Attendance: 3,800
Referee: Per Arne Larsgård

== Semi-finals ==
18 September 1983

Moss	3–1	Kongsvinger
Rafn 17'; Henæs 46'; Henriksen 75'		Nysæter 12'

Melløs Stadion, Moss
Attendance: 5,476
Referee: Thorodd Presberg

18 September 1983

Vålerengen	1–0	Steinkjer
Fredheim 12'

Bislett Stadion, Oslo
Attendance: 8,949
Referee: Einar Halle

== Final ==
23 October 1983
13:15 CEST (UTC+2)

Moss	2–0	Vålerengen
Kollshaugen 9' (pen.); Henæs 84'	Report

Ullevaal Stadion, Oslo
Attendance: 23,000
Referee: Thorodd Presberg (Strømsgodset)
