= 1982 Norwegian First Division =

38th season of top-tier football league in Norway

1. divisjon
- Season: 1982
- Dates: 25 April – 10 October
- Champions: Viking; 7th title
- Relegated: Fredrikstad; Sogndal; Molde
- European Cup: Viking
- UEFA Cup: Bryne
- Matches: 132
- Goals: 355 (2.69 per match)
- Top goalscorer: Tor Arne Granerud; Trygve Johannessen (11 goals)
- Biggest home win: Vålerengen 5–1 Rosenborg (13 June 1982); Lillestrøm 4–0 Fredrikstad (29 August 1982); Vålerengen 4–0 Mjøndalen (5 September 1982)
- Biggest away win: HamKam 0–4 Rosenborg (27 June 1982)
- Highest scoring: Lillestrøm 7–4 Molde (8 August 1982)
- Longest winning run: Lillestrøm; Vålerengen (4 games)
- Longest unbeaten run: Viking (9 games)
- Longest winless run: Start (10 games)
- Longest losing run: Lillestrøm; Vålerengen (4 games)
- Highest attendance: 21,201; Rosenborg 1–1 Start (16 May 1982)
- Lowest attendance: 835; Sogndal 0–0 Mjøndalen (10 October 1982)
- Average attendance: 4,568 ▼22.3%

The 1982 1. divisjon was the 38th completed season of top division football in Norway.

== Overview ==
22 games were played with 2 points given for wins and 1 for draws. Number eleven and twelve were relegated. The winners of the two groups of the 2. divisjon were promoted, as well as the winner of a series of play-off matches between number ten in the First Division and the two second-placed teams in the two groups of the 2. divisjon.

Viking won the championship, their seventh title.

== Teams and locations ==
Note: Table lists in alphabetical order.

Team	Ap.	Location	Stadium
Bryne	7	Bryne	Bryne Stadion
Fredrikstad	33	Fredrikstad	Fredrikstad Stadion
Hamarkameratene	11	Hamar	Briskeby
Lillestrøm	19	Lillestrøm	Åråsen Stadion
Mjøndalen	13	Mjøndalen	Nedre Eiker Stadion
Molde	9	Molde	Molde Stadion
Moss	9	Moss	Melløs Stadion
Rosenborg	19	Trondheim	Lerkendal Stadion
Sogndal	1	Sogndalsfjøra	Fosshaugane
Start	15	Kristiansand	Kristiansand Stadion
Vålerengen	27	Oslo	Bislett Stadion
Viking	35	Stavanger	Stavanger Stadion

== League table ==
Pos	Team	Pld	W	D	L	GF	GA	GD	Pts	Qualification or relegation
1	Viking (C)	22	11	7	4	39	24	+15	29	Qualification for the European Cup first round
2	Bryne	22	10	6	6	25	25	0	26	Qualification for the UEFA Cup first round
3	Lillestrøm	22	11	3	8	35	26	+9	25	
4	Vålerengen	22	10	4	8	35	21	+14	24	
5	Hamarkameratene	22	11	2	9	33	35	−2	24	
6	Rosenborg	22	7	9	6	32	29	+3	23	
7	Mjøndalen	22	9	5	8	28	32	−4	23	
8	Moss	22	6	8	8	27	26	+1	20	
9	Start	22	7	6	9	28	32	−4	20	
10	Fredrikstad (R)	22	5	8	9	22	31	−9	18	Qualification for the relegation play-offs
11	Sogndal (R)	22	5	6	11	25	33	−8	16	Relegation to Second Division
12	Molde (R)	22	4	8	10	26	41	−15	16	Relegation to Second Division

Source: NIFS
Rules for classification: 1) points; 2) goal difference; 3) number of goals scored.
(C) Champions; (R) Relegated

== Results ==
Home \ Away	BRY	FRE	HAM	LIL	MIF	MOL	MOS	ROS	SOG	IKS	VIK	VÅL
Bryne	—	2–0	1–3	2–1	0–0	3–2	0–0	1–0	1–0	3–3	1–1	1–0
Fredrikstad	1–1	—	0–1	1–2	4–2	2–1	1–1	1–1	2–1	0–0	2–0	0–2
Hamarkameratene	0–1	3–4	—	1–0	1–1	2–1	2–1	0–4	0–1	5–3	1–4	1–0
Lillestrøm	1–0	4–0	1–0	—	2–1	7–4	2–2	1–0	0–1	0–1	1–2	0–2
Mjøndalen	3–0	2–0	1–0	2–4	—	4–1	1–0	1–0	2–1	0–2	2–1	1–0
Molde	0–1	0–0	1–3	2–1	2–2	—	1–0	1–1	0–0	0–0	1–3	1–1
Moss	1–1	0–0	1–1	0–0	2–0	4–1	—	2–2	2–1	3–1	0–1	3–2
Rosenborg	2–1	2–2	3–0	0–2	3–1	0–1	2–1	—	2–1	1–1	1–1	1–0
Sogndal	3–0	2–2	1–2	0–3	0–0	1–1	2–1	3–3	—	2–1	0–1	0–1
Start	2–1	1–0	1–3	0–1	3–0	4–2	1–2	1–1	1–0	—	0–2	0–2
Viking	1–2	2–0	1–2	4–1	2–2	1–1	2–1	2–2	3–3	3–1	—	0–0
Vålerengen	1–2	1–0	4–2	1–1	4–0	1–2	2–0	5–1	5–2	1–1	0–2	—

Source: nifs.no (in Norwegian)
Legend: Blue = home team win; Yellow = draw; Red = away team win.

== Relegation play-offs ==
The qualification play-off matches were contested between Fredrikstad (10th in the 1. divisjon), Eik (2nd in the 2. divisjon - Group A), and Steinkjer (2nd in the 2. divisjon - Group B). Eik won both their games and were promoted to the 1. divisjon.

Results

- Fredrikstad 2–3 Eik
- Steinkjer 1–3 Fredrikstad
- Eik 2–1 Steinkjer

Pos	Team	Pld	W	D	L	GF	GA	GD	Pts	Promotion or relegation
1	Eik (O, P)	2	2	0	0	5	3	+2	4	Promotion to First Division
2	Fredrikstad (R)	2	1	0	1	5	4	+1	2	Relegation to Second Division
3	Steinkjer	2	0	0	2	2	5	−3	0	Remained in Second Division

Source: rsssf.no
(O) Play-off winners; (P) Promoted; (R) Relegated

== Season statistics ==
=== Top scorers ===
Rank	Player	Club	Goals
1	(Norway) Tor Arne Granerud	Ham-Kam	11
1	(Norway) Trygve Johannessen	Viking	11
3	(Norway) Svein Mathisen	Start	10
3	(Norway) Lasse Opseth	Sogndal	10
5	(Finland) Juhani Himanka	Lillestrøm	9
5	(Norway) Sverre Brandhaug	Rosenborg	9
5	(Norway) Bernt Mæland	Bryne	9
8	(Norway) Pål Jacobsen	Vålerengen	8
8	(Norway) Geir Henæs	Moss	8
8	(Norway) Jan Berg	Molde	8

=== Attendances ===
Pos	Team	Total	High	Low	Average	Change
1	Rosenborg	87,265	17,500	3,130	7,933	−39.3%
2	Viking	83,584	14,140	5,140	7,599	−1.7%
3	Vålerengen	83,503	13,193	4,503	7,591	−25.9%
4	Moss	47,504	7,816	2,351	4,319	−14.2%
5	Fredrikstad	45,984	6,640	1,887	4,180	−12.4%
6	Lillestrøm	43,962	7,536	2,546	3,997	−3.9%
7	Bryne	42,633	11,000	1,750	3,876	−9.0%
8	HamKam	40,914	7,097	2,517	3,719	+3.5%
9	Start	39,398	6,235	1,555	3,582	−13.6%
10	Molde	34,593	5,100	1,550	3,145	n/a^{2}
11	Mjøndalen	29,717	5,523	1,579	2,702	n/a^{2}
12	Sogndal	23,979	3,320	835	2,180	n/a^{2}
	League total	603,036	17,500	835	4,568	−22.3%

Source: nifs.no
Notes:
2: Team played last season in 2. divisjon.
