= FK Landsås =

Norwegian football club

- Full name: Fotballklubben Landsås
- Founded: 4 June 1945
- Ground: Landsås Idrettspark – 68° Nord Arena, Harstad
- League: Fourth Division
- 2024: 4th

Fotballklubben Landsås is a Norwegian association football club from Harstad.

The club was founded on 4 June 1945, after the end of the German occupation of Norway. For some years, team handball was also practised in the club.

The men's football team currently plays in the Fourth Division, the fifth tier of football in Norway.

The team reached the Norwegian Cup most years between 1975 and 1986. They lost to Mjølner in 1972 (first round), 1976 (second round), 1977 (first round), 1980 (second round); lost to Bodø/Glimt in 1975 (second round), 1979 (first round), 1981 (first round), 1986 (first round); and lost to Harstad in 1983 (first round). In the league system, the team was a mainstay in the Third Division throughout the 1990s until being relegated in 2000. Following another one-off Third Division season in 2004, Landsås enjoyed a longer spell from 2006 to 2011.

The women's football team currently plays in the Third Division.
