= Østfold derbies =

Sports rivalries in Norway

Østfold derbies are sports rivalries within and between the three largest cities in Østfold, Norway. Rivalries spread across multiple sports including association football and ice hockey.

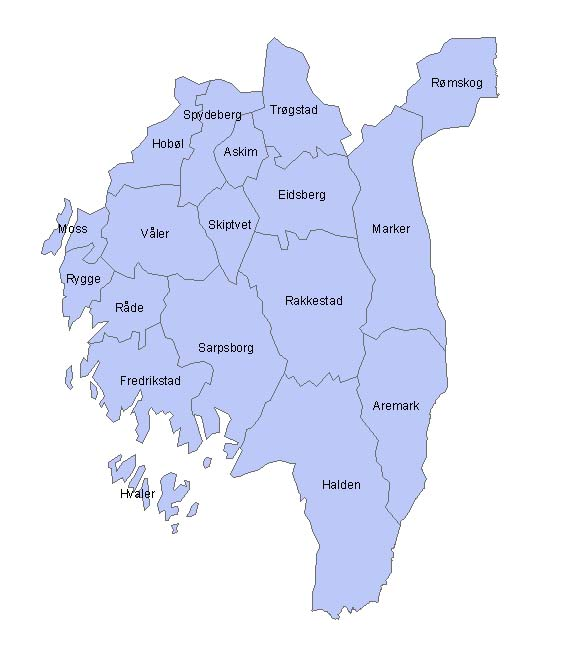
Municipalities in Østfold prior to 2020.

Geographically, the cities Sarpsborg and Fredrikstad are among the closest cities in Norway, making up the Lower Glomma Region. Sarpsborg is the oldest and Fredrikstad the largest. Moss and Halden are smaller and are located in the corners of Østfold county, in the northwest and southeast respectively.

== Intra-city rivalries ==
Derbies arose within cities before World War II. In 1924, the Workers Federation of Sports split from the Norwegian Confederation of Sports, either bringing over existing teams or establishing new ones for the working class. In Sarpsborg, IL Sparta arose as a rival of Sarpsborg FK. In 1936, settlement games (Norwegian: forlikskamper) were played between selected NIF and AIF teams, laying groundwork for a later remerging of the two federations; the match between Sparta and Sarpsborg was described as hard-fought before an audience of 3,000.

In Fredrikstad, a similar division existed between the "bourgeois" Fredrikstad FK and the workers' Østsiden IL. Later national team manager Egil Olsen started his career in Østsiden, and a transfer to Fredrikstad in the 1950s or 1960s was out of the question; he would rather play in the other city for Sarpsborg FK. Fifty years later, the perceptions had loosened and Olsen was able to manage Fredrikstad.

== Inter-city rivalries ==
Fredrikstad FK and Sarpsborg FK were both among Norway's best football teams for men until the 1950s. Fredrikstad won nine league titles, the last in 1961, and twelve cup titles. In Sarpsborg, Sparta won the Norwegian Cup in 1952 whereas Sarpsborg won in 1917, 1929, 1939, 1948, 1949 and 1951. Following this heyday, Sarpsborg were last relegated from the highest league in 1974, and languished in lower divisions. In 2008, the clubs in the city managed to form a cooperation team Sarpsborg 08 FF which again reached the highest division and became competitive with Fredrikstad FK.

Following the league matches between Sarpsborg and Fredrikstad on the second tier in 1979, the clubs did not face each other on the first or second tier until the 2009 Eliteserien promotion/relegation play-offs. Sarpsborg 08 then beat Fredrikstad away on 6 November 2009, ensuring the latter's relegation from the first tier. Sarpsborg 08 progressed, but were unable to win promotion. The clubs therefore faced each other in 2010 First Division, fighting for direct promotion throughout the season. Fredrikstad's home match gathered a 10,690-strong audience. In the end, both were promoted.

While Fredrikstad and Sarpsborg were struggling, Moss FK arose as the best football club in Østfold for several years, among others winning the 1983 cup and the 1987 league title. Melløs stadion saw an attendance of 10,085 between Moss and Fredrikstad in the 2003 First Division, the highest at Melløs in the modern area.

=== Players for multiple clubs ===
Players including Simen Brenne (from Fredrikstad) and Amin Askar (from Moss) have played for both Fredrikstad, Moss and Sarpsborg 08. Raymond Kvisvik (from Sarpsborg) are among the players who played for both Fredrikstad, Moss and Sarpsborg FK.

== Ice hockey ==
The Sarpsborg–Fredrikstad derby between Sparta and Stjernen is described as "among the most traditional and intense battles in Norwegian ice hockey.

Additionally, Halden's IK Comet has played against Sparta and Stjernen in the highest hockey league.
