= Erik Foss =

Norwegian footballer (born 1954)

Personal information
- Date of birth: 29 April 1954 (age 72)
- Position: Forward

Senior career*
Years	Team	Apps	(Gls)
1975–1982	Vålerengen		
1983–1985	Kolbotn		
1986	Vålerengen		
1986	Frigg		
1987	Kolbotn		

Managerial career
- 1983–1985: Kolbotn (player-manager)
- 1986: Frigg (player-manager)
- 1988: Mercantile
- 2004: Kolbotn women
- * Club domestic league appearances and goals

Erik Foss (born 29 April 1954) is a Norwegian footballer and manager. Spending most of his career in Vålerengen, he became known as a cult hero.

In Vålerengen (later called Vålerenga), Erik Foss has been regarded as "the last Bohemian" and as such a "cult hero". A highlight for the "Bohemian" era in Vålerengen was the victory over rivals Lillestrøm in the 1980 Norwegian Football Cup final. A commentator stated that Vålerengen's legacy as a "Bohemian team" "died" after the 1980 cup final, though Vålerengen also won the 1981 Norwegian First Division. According to Finn Olstad's history about Vålerenga, Erik Foss was remembered for his "swaggering step, his unpredictable style of play and with the socks rolled down to the ankles", and bestows the "last Bohemian" moniker upon Foss "or perhaps Henning Bjarnøy". Olstad found that 1979 might have been the last "true" Bohemian season, with 1980 being a transitional year into the 1980s which were marked by more of a yuppie and flashy financial style.

In European football, Foss played in the 1975–76 UEFA Cup and the 1981–82 European Cup Winners' Cup, as well as the 1982–83 European Cup, where Vålerengen never progressed past the first round.

He was hired as player-manager of Kolbotn in 1983, and steered the team to win promotion to the Third Division in 1984. After being relegated back to the Fourth Division, Foss left after the 1985 season to take on an administrative role. At the same time, he tried a comeback as a player in Vålerengen.

In the autumn of 1986, Foss took over as manager of Frigg, where the chairman had sacked two other coaches. Frigg won promotion to the Third Division, but after two league matches in 1987, Foss resigned. He claimed that the chairman meddled too much in how the team should be coached. In August 1987, Foss rejoined Kolbotn as a player. After the season, he decided to take over as manager of Mercantile SFK which recently had won promotion to the Fourth Division. After securing Mercantile's second straight promotion in 1988, he left the helm to Lars Tjærnås.

In the summer of 200,4 Foss returned to Kolbotn, this time as the manager of the women's team in Toppserien. Foss was also a color commentator for TV 2
