= Association football statues in Norway =

Association football statues in Norway are found in several cities. They were uncommon until the 1990s, with a large spike in statues being erected after 2015. Most are placed outside of football stadiums, whereas a few are found in city centres.

== Stavanger ==
In 1955, sculptor Magnus Vigrestad was asked to form a bronze statue to commemorate sportspeople who died during World War II. The statue was named Fotballspilleren ("The Footballer"). It was set to be cast on 1 December 1957; on that day, Vigrestad died in a traffic accident. The statue was unveiled in 1958. It was placed outside Stavanger stadion, and also Eiganes Cemetery. While four different models were used to make the sculpture, it is mainly associated with Stavanger's greatest footballer at the time, Reidar Kvammen. The square where the statue is located is named Reidar Kvammens plass. In the 2000s the base was in disrepair.

== Lillestrøm ==
A statue of Lillestrøm SK player Tom Lund was made by Bjørn Sørvang Hansen and unveiled in June 1990. Titled "Steget" ("The Step"), Lund was only used as a face model. Somewhat uniquely in Norway, it became a perennial target of pranks and vandalism, owing to the Lillestrøm–Vålerenga rivalry. Among others, paint were spilled over the sculpture. In June 2013, its head was sawed off and removed by unknown culprits. The action was criticized by Klanen, the largest supporter club for Vålerenga. Sørvang Hansen had kept the mould. It was thus recreated and the statue returned to its complete state in November 2013. The next year, fans of Stabæk were suspected as "Steget" was painted blue.

The artist Bjørn Sørvang Hansen expressed a desire to make sculptures of two other football personalities, Egil Olsen and Erik Mykland.

== Bergen ==
Roald "Kniksen" Jensen was regarded as one of Norway's most skilled footballers, and mostly played for SK Brann as well as Heart of Midlothian. His life ended tragically as he died on the pitch as an old boys player in 1987. Eight years later, a bronze statue by Per Ung, bearing Roald Jensen's namee and nickname on the base, was unveiled outside of Brann Stadion on 28 May 1995. Brann officials adorn the statue with flowers on 16 May, the day before Norway's national day, and colloquially called "football's national day".

== Ålesund ==
In Ålesund, Color Line Stadion was opened in 2005, and with it, a new statue. The depiction of a footballer performing a left-footed volley bore a clear resemblance to Ålesund's greatest footballer John Arne Riise, who was still active when the statue was erected. The artist Tore Bjørn Skjølsvik confirmed that Riise had stood model. The sculpture was named Fotballspilleren ("The Footballer"), with Riise expressing his dismay on Twitter, believing it was "arrogant" to not name it after him. Riise also criticized the current manager of Aalesunds FK, who had stated that he was "principally against" erecting a statue of an individual player. According to Aalesunds FK representatives, it was "in the cards" that the title could be changed to "John Arne Riise" when Riise ultimately retired, and the name was changed accordingly in 2018.

== Drammen ==
Strømsgodset IF won their first league title in 1970. Steinar Pettersen was regarded as the greatest player of that team. As Pettersen turned 70 years old in 2015, a statue of him was proposed by Rune Marthinsen, and the proposal brought before Drammen city council by politician Masud Gharahkhani. Already one year later, a statue of him was unveiled in May 2016. In the 2020s, Pettersen was Drammen's only living person to have a statue of himself.

== Sarpsborg ==
Asbjørn Halvorsen had his sculpture unveiled on the grounds of Sarpsborg FK in 2017. Unusually among Norwegian footballers, this was in the form of a bust. The artist was Merete Sejersted Bødtker. The bust was moved to central Sarpsborg in 2023, to the square Haralds plass which was renamed to Asbjørn Halvorsens plass.

== Trondheim ==
Nils Arne Eggen was capped 29 times for Norway as a player, but became more prominent as manager of Rosenborg BK. He was also still living when a statue of him was erected outside Lerkendal Stadion in June 2019. The statue, made by Errol Fyrileiv, depicts Eggen pointing and screaming directions as he would do towards his players.

Another sculpture had previously been erected near Eggen's home in Fannrem. This was a bronze sculpture of a foot kicking a ball, named "Go'foten" ("The Good Foot"), which referred to Nils Arne Eggen's philosophy of teamwork.

== Sandefjord ==
In 2019, plans were announced to erect a statue of Thorbjørn Svenssen. The defender was the most-capped Norwegian player for several decades. Svein Erik Evensen was attributed as having harbored the idea for an extended period, and had support from mayor Bjørn Ole Gleditsch among others. The statue was made by Oddmund Raudberget and unveiled in central Sandefjord on St. John's Day in 2020.

== Bodø ==
Errol Fyrileiv was also the artist tasked with making a statue of Harald Berg. Berg was not only one of the greatest players for FK Bodø/Glimt and in Norway during the 1960s and 1970s, but had three sons and a grandson who also became prominent Bodø/Glimt players. The statue was unveiled outside of Aspmyra Stadion in September 2023, bearing the caption "Førr evig" (dialectal expression of "forever") together with Berg's name and birthdate. It happened in the aftermath of Bodø/GLimt winning their first Norwegian league title and becoming a contender in European competitions. It attracted some criticism when Bodø/Glimt, which had become Norway's wealthiest football club, asked Bodø Municipality to supply half of the budget.

In this case, the sculpture was not only of Harald Berg, as two additional figures, a boy and a girl, were added to the artwork in 2024 to represent the future. Solskjær was manager of Manchester United at the time, and supporters argued that he was the most widely known Norwegian individual worldwide.

== Horten ==
Per Bredesen played in the 1950s and early 1960s, among others for Ørn Horten, SS Lazio and AC Milan, and died in October 2022. Soon after that, a local group in Horten raised money for a statue of Bredesen. Before the summer of 2023, the group was able to commission such a statue from Oddmund Raudberget, the creator of the Thorbjørn Svenssen statue. Per Bredesen's sculpture was unveiled in May 2024.

== Kristiansund ==
In 2021, Tore Bjørn Skjølsvik had finalized a sculpture of Ole Gunnar Solskjær, in a standing pose with arms crossed. A fundraiser to have the statue erected took place. The statue was unveiled at Campus Kristiansund, in the city centre, in November 2024.
