= 1979 Norwegian First Division =

35th season of top-tier football league in Norway

1. divisjon
- Season: 1979
- Dates: 22 April – 14 October 1979
- Champions: Viking; 6th title
- Relegated: Hamarkameratene; Mjøndalen; Brann
- European Cup: Viking
- UEFA Cup: Moss
- Matches: 132
- Goals: 352 (2.67 per match)
- Top goalscorer: Odd Iversen (16 goals)
- Biggest home win: HamKam 6–1 Mjøndalen (11 June 1979)
- Biggest away win: Skeid 0–4 Start (13 May 1979); Brann 0–4 Lillestrøm (14 June 1979); Mjøndalen 0–4 Start (18 June 1979); Viking 0–4 Skeid (1 October 1979)
- Highest scoring: Vålerengen 5–4 Mjøndalen (22 April 1979)
- Longest winning run: Start (5 games)
- Longest unbeaten run: Moss (12 games)
- Longest winless run: Brann (12 games)
- Longest losing run: Brann (6 games)
- Highest attendance: 15,783; Brann 2–1 Skeid (22 April 1979)
- Lowest attendance: 1,494; Mjøndalen 2–4 Bryne (14 October 1979)
- Average attendance: 6,238 ▲12.7%

The 1979 1. divisjon was the 35th completed season of top division football in Norway.

== Overview ==
It was contested by 12 teams, and Viking FK won their sixth league title.

== Teams and locations ==
Note: Table lists in un-alphabetical order.

Team	Ap.	Location	Stadium
Bodø/Glimt	3	Bodø	Aspmyra Stadion
Brann	27	Bergen	Brann Stadion
Bryne	4	Bryne	Bryne Stadion
Hamarkameratene	9	Hamar	Briskeby
Lillestrøm	16	Lillestrøm	Åråsen Stadion
Mjøndalen	12	Mjøndalen	Nedre Eiker Stadion
Moss	6	Moss	Melløs Stadion
Rosenborg	16	Trondheim	Lerkendal Stadion
Skeid	30	Oslo	
Start	12	Kristiansand	Kristiansand Stadion
Vålerengen	24	Oslo	Bislett Stadion
Viking	32	Stavanger	Stavanger Stadion

== League table ==
Pos	Team	Pld	W	D	L	GF	GA	GD	Pts	Qualification or relegation
1	Viking (C)	22	13	6	3	31	16	+15	32	Qualification for the European Cup first round
2	Moss	22	12	6	4	41	25	+16	30	Qualification for the UEFA Cup first round
3	Start	22	12	3	7	36	21	+15	27	
4	Bryne	22	11	3	8	37	28	+9	25	
5	Lillestrøm	22	7	9	6	25	23	+2	23	
6	Rosenborg	22	9	4	9	31	29	+2	22	
7	Bodø/Glimt	22	8	5	9	19	26	−7	21	
8	Vålerengen	22	8	4	10	33	41	−8	20	
9	Skeid	22	7	5	10	24	27	−3	19	
10	Hamarkameratene (R)	22	7	4	11	29	33	−4	18	Relegation to Second Division
11	Mjøndalen (R)	22	6	5	11	28	43	−15	17	Relegation to Second Division
12	Brann (R)	22	3	4	15	18	40	−22	10	Relegation to Second Division

Source: NIFS
Rules for classification: 1) points; 2) goal difference; 3) number of goals scored.
(C) Champions; (R) Relegated

== Results ==
Home \ Away	B/G	BRA	BRY	HAM	LIL	MIF	MOS	ROS	SKE	IKS	VIK	VÅL
Bodø/Glimt	—	2–0	2–1	3–2	1–0	2–0	0–2	2–1	0–0	1–1	0–2	0–1
Brann	1–1	—	3–0	1–2	0–4	2–2	1–3	0–0	2–1	1–0	0–2	0–1
Bryne	4–0	3–1	—	4–0	3–0	0–0	1–1	2–1	0–1	0–3	2–3	1–0
Hamarkameratene	2–0	4–1	0–1	—	0–0	6–1	3–2	1–1	0–0	0–1	1–1	2–0
Lillestrøm	0–2	3–1	1–1	1–0	—	2–0	1–3	0–2	0–0	2–0	1–1	3–1
Mjøndalen	0–1	2–1	2–4	3–1	0–0	—	0–1	2–3	1–0	0–4	0–1	2–1
Moss	2–2	2–0	3–1	3–1	1–1	3–3	—	1–1	1–2	2–0	2–1	1–1
Rosenborg	2–0	1–0	1–3	2–0	0–1	3–0	1–3	—	3–2	2–3	1–0	1–2
Skeid	2–0	2–2	2–1	1–2	0–0	1–2	0–2	1–0	—	0–4	1–2	1–2
Start	0–0	1–0	1–2	2–1	3–1	0–2	4–0	1–1	1–0	—	0–3	4–1
Viking	2–0	1–0	1–0	2–0	1–1	2–2	1–0	3–0	0–4	1–0	—	1–1
Vålerengen	1–0	3–1	2–3	3–1	3–3	5–4	0–3	2–4	2–3	1–3	0–0	—

Source: nifs.no (in Norwegian)
Legend: Blue = home team win; Yellow = draw; Red = away team win.

== Season statistics ==
=== Top scorer ===
- (Norway) Odd Iversen, Vålerengen – 18 goals

=== Attendances ===
Pos	Team	Total	High	Low	Average	Change
1	Brann	112,823	15,783	5,227	10,257	−31.4%
2	Rosenborg	101,734	15,652	4,470	9,249	n/a^{2}
3	Viking	101,596	12,840	6,275	9,236	+14.5%
4	Vålerengen	81,385	12,403	4,104	7,399	+0.7%
5	Start	69,319	11,183	4,052	6,302	−4.4%
6	Moss	64,009	8,163	4,091	5,819	+20.2%
7	Lillestrøm	57,590	11,044	2,206	5,235	−19.8%
8	Bodø/Glimt	54,654	6,913	3,715	4,969	−8.6%
9	Bryne	51,084	9,018	2,500	4,644	+10.4%
10	Skeid	48,599	9,217	2,011	4,418	+32.5%
11	HamKam	45,004	6,000	2,913	4,091	n/a^{2}
12	Mjøndalen	35,590	4,541	1,494	3,235	n/a^{2}
	League total	823,387	15,783	1,494	6,238	+12.7%

Source: nifs.no
Notes:
2: Team played last season in 2. divisjon.
