= Lars Tjærnås =

Norwegian football manager (born 1960)

Personal information
- Date of birth: 20 March 1960 (age 66)
- Place of birth: Oslo, Norway

Youth career
- Årvoll

Senior career*
Years	Team	Apps	(Gls)
- Årvoll

Managerial career
- –1984: Årvoll (youth)
- 1984: Årvoll
- 1981: → Bodø/Glimt (youth)
- 1985–1988: Grei
- 1989–1990: Mercantile
- 1991–1992: Bærum
- 1990s: Norway youth national teams
- 1993–1995: Stabæk
- 1997: Vålerenga (director of sports)
- 1998: Vålerenga
- 1998–1999: Vålerenga (assistant)
- 1999–2000: Wimbledon (assistant)
- 2000: L/F Hønefoss
- 2001: Lillestrøm (developer)
- 2002–2003: Hønefoss
- 2004–2005: Kongsberg (director of sports)
- 2006–2008: Hamkam (director of sports)
- * Club domestic league appearances and goals

Lars Tjærnås (born 20 March 1960) is a Norwegian football manager. He notably managed Stabæk and Vålerenga in the Eliteserien, managed Bærum, Stabæk and Hønefoss in Norway's second league, and was assistant manager of Wimbledon.

== Early career ==
He played youth football for Årvoll IL, among others reaching the semi-final of the 1977 Norwegian Youth Cup, with teammates such as André Krogsæter. He started his coaching career in the same club while still being a teenager.

In 1981 he had a spell coaching a boys' team in Bodø/Glimt, while he was summoned for compulsory military service in Bodø. In 1985 Tjærnås went from the senior team of Årvoll to SF Grei, leading the team to three straight promotions from the Sixth to the Third Division. Ahead of the 1988 season he almost took the helm at Odds BK, but the move did not come to fruition. In 1989 he took over a different Oslo club, Mercantile SFK. Tjærnås concurrently coached youth national teams, including Norway U17, later U18 and U20, and had various other tasks within the Football Association, including the scouting of Norway's opponents during the 1994 FIFA World Cup.

From 1991 he managed Bærum SK, the second year as co-coach with Tom Nordlie. Bærum won promotion from the 1991 Second Division to the second tier. Tjærnås resigned after the 1992 season. It then emerged that Tjærnås took over as the manager of Bærum's then-challengers, Stabæk. He led Stabæk to promotions from the 1993 Second Division and 1994 First Division, to its debut season on the first tier in 1995. Stabæk even saved their berth in that league. Having achieved that, however, Tjærnås resigned because thinking about tactics all the time was taxing on him and his family life. He reportedly rejected advances from Lillestrøm SK and IK Start to become manager there. Tjærnås intermittently found work in the Football Association working with player development and also helped the Norway women's national football team prepare for the 1996 Olympics.

In 1997, Tjærnås began as a football commentator for television. He was notably the sidekick commentator to NRK's Arne Scheie during the 1998 FIFA World Cup match where Norway beat Brazil, a match Tjærnås later wrote a book on: Vi har scoret i Marseille, released by Gyldendal in 2013.

Ahead of the 1996 and 1997 seasons, Tjærnås was in contact with two respective clubs, first Tromsø IL and then Bodø/Glimt, about the managerial positions. Tjærnås ultimately embarked on a job in Oslo's biggest club Vålerenga. Under manager Vidar Davidsen the team won promotion from the 1997 First Division and won the 1997 cup, but by that time, Tjærnås had already been announced as Davidsen's successor in 1998. By August 1998, Tjærnås asked to be replaced, and Vålerenga brought in the now ex-national team coach, Egil Olsen with Tjærnås assuming the position as Olsen's assistant. When Olsen was surprisingly recruited to Wimbledon F.C. in 1999 by the club's new Norwegian owners, Tjærnås came along as assistant manager there as well. The duo were sacked in 2000. Formally, it was the new manager Terry Burton who did not wish to continue with Tjærnås as assistant.

In the early summer of 2000, Tjærnås declined to take the manager job of Austrian club SW Bregenz. He has described this as his biggest regret. Back in Norway, Tjærnås took over L/F Hønefoss in July 2000 to save the team from relegation from the 2000 First Division. He only worked throughout the season, then took one year as player developer in Lillestrøm SK, before again committing to Hønefoss ahead of the 2002 season. He led the team to high placements in the First Division, with the club also changing its name to Hønefoss BK. Tjærnås resigned after the 2003 season, after he began experiencing voice loss.

In this period, Tjærnås declined multiple advances or prospects from clubs regarding managerial positions, including Sandefjord and Follo. To spare his voice he did newspaper interviews in writing. Instead of coaching, he took a more administrative role as director of sports, first in minnows Kongsberg IF through football commentator colleague Kenneth Fredheim. He then worked that job in addition to leading a development project for Asker, in addition to taking scouting assignments.

From 2006 Tjærnås was the director of sports for Hamarkameratene, but let his contract run out after three years to again concentrate more on his TV work as well as a column in Aftenposten. Tjærnås continued as a TV commentator for decades. In 2013, he criticized Norway's national team—once again coached by Egil Olsen—for being "bad as shit", but when Olsen was sacked later the same month, Tjærnås lauded the manager and called for the construction of a statue of Olsen.

He also accepted an offer in July 2009 to become Fredrikstad FK's chief analyst. His job was cut from the budget in March 2010. In May 2010, Tjærnås was almost hired for his third stint in Hønefoss, but the Football Association did not sanction the plan the club laid out.

Tjærnås was also chief scout for Brann from 2015 to 2017, followed by the years 2018 to 2020 when he was the chief scout for Vålerenga, leading a team of 14 scouts. After that he advised IK Start in their scouting.
