= Lasse Olsen =

Norwegian footballer (born 1973)

Personal information
- Date of birth: 18 November 1973 (age 52)
- Place of birth: Oslo, Norway
- Height: 1.84 m (6 ft 0 in)
- Position: Forward

Youth career
- 1980–1991: Gjelleråsen
- 1991–1992: Vålerenga

Senior career*
Years	Team	Apps	(Gls)
1993–1997	Gjelleråsen		
1997–2004	Strømsgodset	229	(63)
2004–2008	Aalesund	92	(19)
2009–2010	Herd		
2010–2011	Mjøndalen	6	(0)
2012	Herd		
2013	Spjelkavik		
2018	Averøykameratene		
2019	Tomrefjord		
2021	Valder		

Managerial career
- –2017: Herd (youth)
- 2018: Averøykameratene
- 2019: Tomrefjord
- 2021: Valder
- * Club domestic league appearances and goals

Lasse Olsen (born 18 November 1973) is a Norwegian former footballer who played as a forward for Gjelleråsen, Strømsgodset, Aalesund, and Mjøndalen.

He is the son of former Vålerenga player Terje Olsen.

After the 2008 season, his contract with Aalesund was not renewed. He initially contemplated retirement, but in late December he was signed by SK Herd together with former teammate Karl Oskar Fjørtoft. From 2012 he continued to play in the lower divisions of Møre og Romsdal.

Embarking on a manager career, he remained as junior and B team coach in SK Herd. He managed Averøykameratene in 2018 before moving on to Tomrefjord. He was hired in IL Valder on a two-year contract ahead of the 2021 season, but was fired after relegation from the 2021 4. divisjon.
