= Tom Rüsz Jacobsen =

Norwegian footballer (born 1953)

Tom R. Jacobsen
Personal information
- Full name: Tom Rüsz Jacobsen
- Date of birth: 20 February 1953 (age 73)
- Place of birth: Tjølling Municipality, Norway
- Height: 1.82 m (6 ft 0 in)
- Position: Goalkeeper

Youth career
- –1972: Halsen

Senior career*
Years	Team	Apps	(Gls)
1972–1977	Fram Larvik		
1978–1979	Bryne	39	(0)
1980–1984	Vålerenga	100	(0)
1985–1987	Fram Larvik		

International career
1975–1983	Norway	26	(0)
- * Club domestic league appearances and goals

Tom Rüsz Jacobsen (born 20 February 1953) is a retired Norwegian footballer. He was a goalkeeper, and played 26 matches for Norway. He won the league three times and the Norwegian Cup one time with Vålerenga.

== Club career ==
Jacobsen most famously played for Vålerenga from 1980 until 1984. He played 100 league games, and managed a clean sheet in 43 of the games. He was elected Man of the Match by VG 10 times. In his 99th league game, he was injured and needed to be taken off the field. In order to get 100 league games, he played the last two minutes of the next game – with a broken arm.

Jacobsen won Norwegian First Division three times, and the Norwegian Football Cup one time with Vålerenga. In the semifinal of the 1980 Norwegian Football Cup, he secured a rematch when he saved Ståle Klubnes's shot with only seconds left of the game. Vålerenga won the rematch against Mo IL, and qualified for the final where they won 4–1 against Lillestrøm SK

== International career ==
Tom Rüsz Jacobsen was capped 26 times for Norway. He made his debut against Soviet Union on 24 September 1975, while he was still playing for third-tier team Fram Larvik. In his first seven international matches, Norway did not score a single goal. His last international appearance was against Yugoslavia on 12 October 1983.

Jacobsen's best performance on the national team, was against Switzerland in Bern on 29 October 1980, when Norway won 2–1 and he was elected Man of the Match by VG with 10 points of 10 possible.

== Honours ==
Vålerenga

- Norwegian First Division (3): 1981, 1983, 1984
- Norwegian Football Cup (1): 1980
