= 2009 Eliteserien promotion/relegation play-offs =

Norwegian football league play-offs

The 2009 Eliteserien promotion/relegation play-offs was the 37th time a spot in the Norwegian top flight was decided by play-off matches between top tier and second level clubs.

At the end of the 2009 season, Bodø/Glimt and Lyn were relegated directly to the 2010 1. divisjon, and was replaced by Haugesund and Hønefoss who were directly promoted.

== Background ==
The play-offs between Eliteserien and 1. divisjon have been held every year since 1972 with exceptions in 1994 and 2011. In 2009, the play-offs took place for the two divisions following the conclusion of the regular season and were contested by the fourteenth-placed club in Eliteserien and the three clubs finishing below the automatic promotion places in 1. divisjon. The fixtures were determined by final league position – two semifinals: 14th in Eliteserien v 5th in 1. divisjon and 4th in 1. divisjon v 5th in 1. divisjon, and the winners then played each other to determine who played in Eliteserien the following season.

== Qualified teams ==
Four teams entered a play-off for the last Eliteserien spot for the 2009 season. These were:

- Fredrikstad (14th placed team in the Tippeligaen)
- Kongsvinger (third placed team in the 1. divisjon)
- Sogndal (fourth placed team in the 1. divisjon)
- Sarpsborg 08 (fifth placed team in the 1. divisjon)

The four teams first played single game knockout semifinals, and the winners (Kongsvinger and Sarpsborg 08) advanced to a two-legged final for the 16th and last spot in the 2010 Tippeligaen season. Kongsvinger were promoted to the top flight with a 5–4 win on aggregate against Sarpsborg 08.

== Matches ==
=== First round ===
Final league position – 1. divisjon
Pos	Team	Pld	W	D	L	GF	GA	GD	Pts
3	Kongsvinger	30	18	2	10	52	37	+15	56
4	Sogndal	30	14	12	4	46	29	+17	54
5	Sarpsborg 08	30	15	5	10	47	38	+9	47

6 November 2009
18:00 CET (UTC+1)

Fredrikstad	0–2	Sarpsborg 08
	Report	Wiig 18', 90'

Fredrikstad Stadion, Fredrikstad
Attendance: 12,404
Referee: Kjetil Sælen

Fredrikstad were relegated to the 1. divisjon.

6 November 2009
18:00 CET (UTC+1)

Kongsvinger	3–1	Sogndal
Brenes 23'; Olsen 33'; Risholt 89'	Report	Flo 45'

Gjemselund Stadion, Kongsvinger
Attendance: 2,221
Referee: Roy Helge Olsen

=== Final ===
The two winning sides from the first round, Sarpsborg 08 and Kongsvinger, took part in a two-legged play-off to decide who would play in the 2010 Tippeligaen.

First leg

9 November 2009
19:35 CET (UTC+1)

Sarpsborg 08	3–2	Kongsvinger
Hoås 8'; Wiig 71'; Jørgensen 81'	Report	Nilsson (red card) 69'; Johannesen 80'; Frejd 90'

Sarpsborg Stadion, Sarpsborg
Attendance: 2,350
Referee: Svein Oddvar Moen

Second leg

12 November 2009
19:35 CET (UTC+1)

Kongsvinger	3–1	Sarpsborg 08
Frejd 5'; Johannesen 26', 31'	Report	Hoås 38'

Gjemselund Stadion, Kongsvinger
Attendance: 2,700
Referee: Terje Hauge

Kongsvinger won 5–4 on aggregate and were promoted to the 2010 Tippeligaen.

== Bracket ==
First round
14	Fredrikstad	0
5	Sarpsborg 08	2
3	Kongsvinger	3
4	Sogndal	1

Second round
5	Sarpsborg 08	3	1	4
3	Kongsvinger	2	3	5
