= Leif Hansen (footballer) =

Danish footballer (born 1955)

Personal information
- Date of birth: 16 February 1955 (age 71)
- Place of birth: Lunderskov, Denmark
- Position: Defender

Senior career*
Years	Team	Apps	(Gls)
- ?
- Esbjerg fB
- Kolding IF

International career
1983	Denmark	4	(0)
- * Club domestic league appearances and goals

Leif Hansen (born 16 February 1955) is a Danish former footballer who played as a defender. He made four appearances for the Denmark national team in 1983.
