= Jon Abrahamsen =

Norwegian footballer (born 1951)

Personal information
- Date of birth: 8 May 1951 (age 75)
- Place of birth: Vardø, Norway
- Position: Goalkeeper

Senior career*
Years	Team	Apps	(Gls)
1969–1972	IL Polarstjernen		
1973–1974	FK Mjølner		
1975–1981	FK Bodø/Glimt	72	(0)

International career
1981	Norway	4	(0)
- * Club domestic league appearances and goals

Jon Abrahamsen (born 8 May 1951) is a Norwegian former football goalkeeper. He is known for his time at FK Bodø/Glimt (played over 300 games 1975-81 in the Norwegian First Division) where he won the Norwegian Football Cup 1975. He played for Norway (3 caps in 1981) under Tor Røste Fossen. Abrahamsen was named in the Press team of the year in 1975 and named by VG as Keeper of the year in 1980. Today he is a technical advisor for Widerøe.
