= Arild Olsen =

Norwegian footballer (born 1952)

Personal information
- Date of birth: 14 January 1952 (age 74)

International career
Years	Team	Apps	(Gls)
1976–1979	Norway	2	(0)

Arild Olsen (born 14 January 1952) is a Norwegian footballer. He played in two matches for the Norway national football team from 1976 to 1979.
