= Rune Hansen =

Norwegian footballer (born 1949)

Personal information
- Date of birth: 8 October 1949 (age 77)
- Position: Defender

Senior career*
Years	Team	Apps	(Gls)
1968–1975	Vålerenga		
1976–1977	Lillestrøm		
1978–1979	Vålerenga		

International career
1977	Norway	1	(0)
- * Club domestic league appearances and goals

Rune Hansen (born 8 October 1949) is a Norwegian footballer who played as a defender. He played in one match for the Norway national football team in 1977. He spent his club career with Vålerenga and Lillestrøm.
