= Arne Amundsen =

Norwegian footballer (1952–2014)

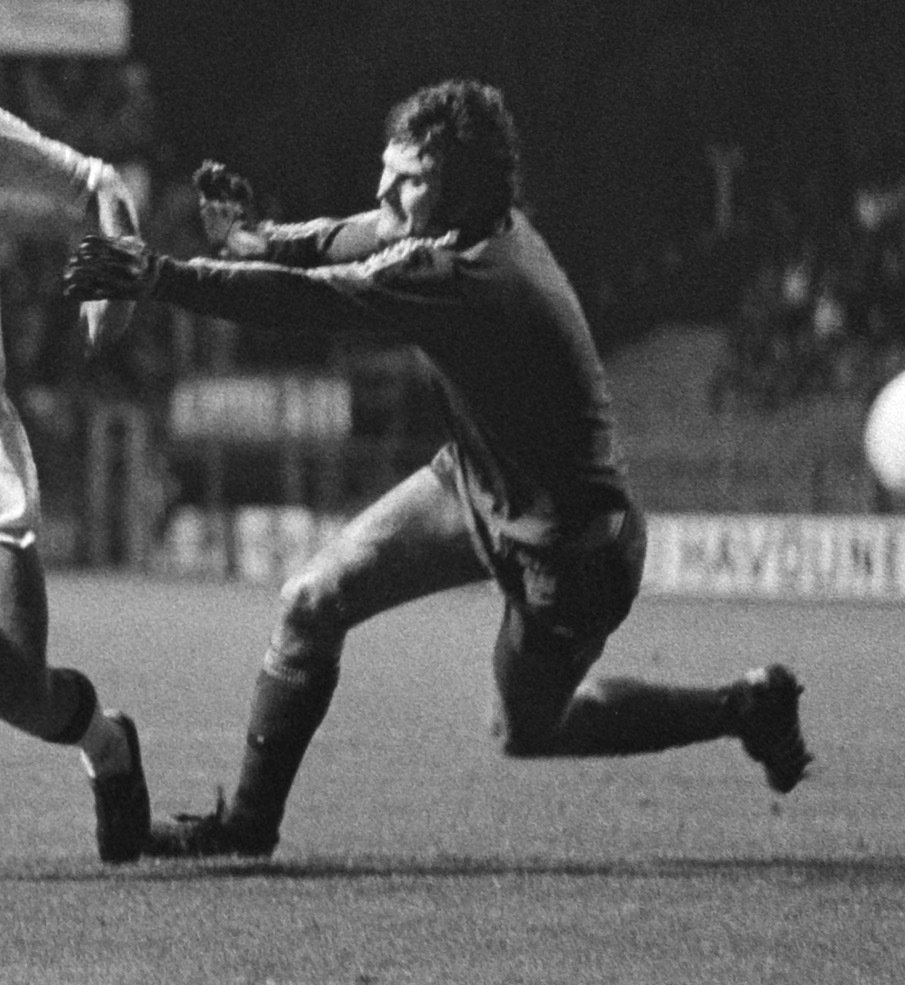
- Arne Amundsen with Lillestrøm in 1977

Personal information
- Date of birth: 7 August 1952
- Date of death: 6 September 2014 (aged 62)
- Position: Goalkeeper

Youth career
- Lyn Fotball

Senior career*
Years	Team	Apps	(Gls)
1972–1976	Lyn Fotball	65	(0)
1977–1987	Lillestrøm SK	227	(0)
1988	Strømmen IF	9	(0)
Total		115	(0)

International career
1979	Norway U21	1	(0)
Medal record
First place	Norwegian First Division	1977
First place	Norwegian Football Cup	1977
First place	Norwegian Football Cup	1978
Second place	Norwegian First Division	1978
Second place	Norwegian Football Cup	1980
First place	Norwegian Football Cup	1981
Second place	Norwegian First Division	1983
Second place	Norwegian First Division	1985
First place	Norwegian Football Cup	1985
First place	Norwegian First Division	1986
Second place	Norwegian Football Cup	1986
- * Club domestic league appearances and goals

Arne Amundsen (7 August 1952 – 6 September 2014) was a Norwegian football goalkeeper who spent the bulk of his career at Lillestrøm SK. He also played for Lyn and Strømmen. He was nicknamed "Maler'n" ("The Painter") because he worked as a housepainter outside football.

Amundsen made his top level debut for Lyn in 1972. He joined Lillestrøm ahead of the 1977 season. At Lillestrøm, Amundsen won the Norwegian First Division (first tier) twice, and played in the Norwegian Cup final six times, winning the competition four times. He left Lillestrøm at the end of the 1987 season after losing his place in the team to Frode Grodås, and joined local rivals Strømmen. He retired after the 1989 season, having played a total of 459 first-team matches (including friendlies) in his career.
