= Terje Olsen (footballer, born 1950) =

Norwegian footballer

Personal information
- Full name: Terje Olsen
- Date of birth: 28 September 1950 (age 76)
- Place of birth: Norway
- Position: Forward

Senior career*
Years	Team	Apps	(Gls)
1968–1975	Vålerengen		
1976–1977	Lillestrøm	43	(9)
1978–1980	Vålerengen		

International career
1971–1979	Norway U21	7	(0)
1972–1974	Norway	3	(0)
- * Club domestic league appearances and goals

Terje Olsen (born 28 September 1950) is a Norwegian former professional footballer who played as a forward for Vålerengen his entire career, except for two seasons which he spent with Lillestrøm. Olsen was capped three times playing for Norway.

== Career ==
Olsen started his career with Vålerengen in 1968, and played for the club until 1975. He then moved to Lillestrøm, where he 43 matches and scored nine goals over two seasons. During his time at Lillestrøm, the team won two consecutive league titles in addition to the Norwegian Cup in 1977. Olsen returned to Vålerengen in 1978, where he again won the Norwegian Cup in 1980. In total, Olsen played 102 matches for Vålerengen scoring 23 goals during his 11 seasons at the club. Only nine other players have played for Vålerengen longer than Olsen, and after Olsen retired the only player to match his 11 seasons is Øyvind Bolthof.

Olsen played seven matches for Norway U21 and was later capped three times for Norway between 1972 and 1974.

Olsen is the father of the footballer Lasse Olsen.
