= Pål Jacobsen =

Norwegian footballer and coach (born 1956)

Personal information
- Full name: Pål Jacobsen
- Date of birth: 20 May 1956 (age 70)
- Place of birth: Molde, Norway
- Position: Forward

Team information
- Current team: Ham-Kam (coach)

Senior career*
Years	Team	Apps	(Gls)
1973–1980	Ham-Kam	?	(?)
1981–1984	Vålerenga	73	(37)
1985–1987	Ham-Kam	?	(?)

International career
1975–1986	Norway	42	(13)
- * Club domestic league appearances and goals

Pål Jacobsen (born 20 May 1956) is a Norwegian football coach and former player. He is the brother of Tom Jacobsen.

His debut for Ham-Kam came at an age of 16 years and 358 days, and he is among the youngest players ever in the Norwegian top division. In the 1981 season Jacobsen became top goalscorer in the Norwegian top division scoring 16 goals. At this date he was playing for Vålerenga. He scored 13 goals in 42 caps for the national team.

Haunted by a failed achilles tendon operation in 1985, he chose to finish his career in 1987. The injury led to amputation in 2001.

Jacobsen currently works as an assistant coach for Ham-Kam, and as a freelance sports journalist in the local newspaper Hamar Arbeiderblad.
