= Ole Johnny Henriksen =

Norwegian footballer (born 1955)

Personal information
- Date of birth: 29 May 1955 (age 71)

International career
Years	Team	Apps	(Gls)
1977–1981	Norway	6	(0)

Ole Johnny Henriksen (born 29 May 1955) is a Norwegian footballer. He played in six matches for the Norway national football team from 1977 to 1981.
