= Stein Kollshaugen =

Norwegian footballer (born 1956)

Personal information
- Date of birth: 16 February 1956 (age 70)
- Place of birth: Gjøvik, Norway

Senior career*
Years	Team	Apps	(Gls)
- Raufoss IL
- Moss FK
- Hamarkameratene

International career
1979–1984	Norway		
- * Club domestic league appearances and goals

Stein Kollshaugen (born 16 February 1956) is a Norwegian football player. He was born in Gjøvik. He played for the club Moss FK, and also for the Norwegian national team. He competed at the 1984 Summer Olympics in Los Angeles.
