= Erik Karlsen =

Norwegian footballer (born 1953)

Personal information
- Date of birth: 26 July 1953 (age 73)
- Position: Forward

Senior career*
Years	Team	Apps	(Gls)
1973–1977	Lillestrøm		
1978–1979	Vålerenga		
1980	Lillestrøm		

International career
1977	Norway	1	(0)
- * Club domestic league appearances and goals

Erik Karlsen (born 26 July 1953) is a Norwegian footballer who played as a forward. He played in one match for the Norway national football team in 1977. He spent his club career with Lillestrøm and Vålerenga.
