= Teie IF =

Norwegian sports club

- Full name: Teie Idrettsforening
- Founded: 4 August 1924
- Ground: Teie idrettspark, Teie
- Manager: Steinar Schjesvold
- League: 4. divisjon
- 2021: 8th
- Website: www.teie.no
Home colours

Teie Idrettsforening is a Norwegian sports club from Nøtterøy in Færder Municipality in Vestfold county. It has sections for association football and team handball. As of September 2024, the men's football team's manager is Steinar Schjesvold.

It was established in 1924, and the club colors are blue and yellow.

The men's football team currently plays in the Fourth Division, the fifth tier of Norwegian football. It played one season in the Second Division in 1996, and after that had a stint in the Third Division from 1997 to 2003.

The football team also has an Under 19's team, who lost 1–3 in game against IL Sandviken in the Norwegian Youth Cup.
