= Einar Halle =

Norwegian football referee (born 1943)

- Born: 29 December 1943 (age 82)

Domestic
| Years | League | Role |
| 1973–1993 | Tippeligaen | Referee |

International
| Years | League | Role |
| 1980–1991 | UEFA | Referee |
| 1995–2012 | UEFA | Referee observer |

Einar Halle (born 29 December 1943) is a Norwegian former football referee who also represented Molde FK as a player. He officiated 187 matches in Tippeligaen, in addition to 130 matches as a UEFA referee. He has later been a referee observer.

== Career ==
Halle hails from Molde and was a promising goalkeeper in his youth. He played 50 matches for Molde FK's first team between 1962 and 1964. He landed on his head during a match against Skarbøvik, and was in hospital for two days. This injury ended his career in Molde FK, but he continued his career as a goalkeeper in lower leagues for Træff and Rival.

Halle started refereeing after his career as player in Molde FK ended, and continued to represent Molde FK as a referee. Halle became a national referee in 1970, and officiated 187 matches in Tippeligaen between 1973 and 1993. He was a part of Molde FK's board, but was told in 1975 that he had to resign from his position by the Norwegian FA. Halle officiated the Norwegian Football Cup final in 1980 between Vålerenga and Lillestrøm, and the final between Fredrikstad and Viking in 1984 and was one of the first referees to have officiated two Norwegian Cup finals.

Halle became an UEFA referee in 1980 and officiated approximately 130 matches across Europe for the next 11 years, including the quarterfinal of the 1986–87 UEFA Cup between Borussia Mönchengladbach and Vitória de Guimarães and the 1990 World Cup qualifier between England and Albania at old Wembley Stadium.

In a match between Austria Wien and Werder Bremen, Halle blew his whistle for half time even though the match had only elapsed for 40 minutes, because he forgot that the match was postponed for five minutes. He realized his mistake before the players entered the changing rooms, and the teams resumed playing. After this incident, Halle was called "Halbzeit Halle" (half-time Halle) by his referee-colleagues. Halle has admitted that clubs tried to bribe him and his colleagues ahead of European matches during the 1980s, but insisted that neither he, nor any of the Norwegian referees that he travelled with, ever accepted the bribes.

In 1995, Halle became a referee-observer for UEFA, and his first match as an observer was the match between Juventus and Manchester United. The UEFA Women's Champions League match between Standard Liège and Turbine Potsdam on 26 September 2012, was his last as a referee-observer.
