= Geir Henæs =

Norwegian footballer (born 1955)

Personal information
- Full name: Geir Olav Henæs
- Date of birth: 3 September 1955 (age 71)
- Position: Forward

Senior career*
Years	Team	Apps	(Gls)
1977–1988	Moss FK	227	(78)

International career
1979	Norway U-21	3	(0)
1979	Norway	1	(0)
- * Club domestic league appearances and goals

Geir Olav Henæs (born 3 September 1955) is a former Norwegian footballer. He played as a striker.

In the period 1977–1988 he played 227 games and scored 78 goals for Moss FK in the Norwegian Premier League. He played three international games for Norway and one game for Norway U-21, all in 1979.
