= Tom Jacobsen =

Norwegian footballer and coach (born 1954)

Personal information
- Full name: Tom Jacbosen
- Date of birth: 17 March 1954 (age 72)
- Place of birth: Norway
- Position: Midfielder

Senior career*
Years	Team	Apps	(Gls)
1971–1978	HamKam		
1979–1982	Vålerenga		
1983–1985	HamKam		

International career
1971–1976	Norway U21	7	(0)
1971–1982	Norway	16	(0)
- * Club domestic league appearances and goals

Tom Jacobsen (born 17 March 1954) is a Norwegian football coach and former player. He played as a midfielder for HamKam and Vålerenga and was capped 16 times playing for Norway. He is the brother of Pål Jacobsen.

== Playing career ==
Jacobsen played for HamKam from 1971 to 1978 and for Vålerenga from 1979 to 1982, before he returned to HamKam where he played until he retired.

He made his debut for Norway at the age of 17 years and 175 days in 1971, and was capped a total of 16 times.

== Coaching career ==
Jacobsen joined HamKam's coaching staff in 2000, after working at Adidas. Along with his brother, Pål Jacobsen, he was a part of Ståle Solbakken's coaching staff when HamKam played in Tippeligaen. After Solbakken left for FC Copenhagen, Jacobsen continued as Frode Grodås' assistant coach. Jacobsen later worked in the youth department of HamKam until the end of the 2010 season, when he left the club for a job at the local NAV office while also coaching the fourth-tier side Ottestad IL in his spare time.
