= Frank Grønlund =

Norwegian football player and official (1952–2026)

Personal information
- Date of birth: 13 December 1952
- Place of birth: Lillestrøm, Norway
- Date of death: 29 September 2026 (aged 73)
- Place of death: Lillestrøm, Norway
- Position: Defender

Youth career
- Lillestrøm SK

Senior career*
Years	Team	Apps	(Gls)
1970–1983	Lillestrøm SK	243	(12)

International career
1981–1982	Norway	2	(0)

Managerial career
- 1984–1985: Skeid
- 1987–1989: Aurskog/Finstadbru
- * Club domestic league appearances and goals

Frank Grønlund (13 December 1952 – 29 September 2026) was a Norwegian football player and official. He played for Lillestrøm SK from 1970 to 1983 as a defender, and was capped twice for the Norway national team. While at Lillestrøm, Grønlund won the Norwegian League twice (1976 and 1977), and the Norwegian Cup three times (1977, 1978, 1981).

After his active career he was player-coach of Skeid (1984–1985) and Aurskog/Finstadbru (1987–1989). From 1991 until 2015, Grønlund worked for Lillestrøm SK as director of sports, managing director, chairman and chief executive.

Grønlund died from complications of vascular dementia on 29 September 2026, at the age of 73.
