= Mosjøen IL =

Norwegian sports club

- Full name: Mosjøen Idrettslag
- Founded: 1892
- Ground: Kippermoen, Mosjøen
- League: 4. divisjon
- 2024: 3. divisjon group 4, 14th of 14 (relegated)
Home colours

Mosjøen Idrettslag is a Norwegian sports club from the town of Mosjøen in Vefsn Municipality, Nordland county. It has sections for association football, gymnastics and skiing.

Mosjøen Turnforening (gymnastics) was founded in 1892, and this is also regarded as the foundation year of the current club. Mosjøen Fotballklubb (football) was founded separately in 1909. In 1914, the two clubs merged, and changed its name to the present name Mosjøen Idrettslag.

The men's football team currently plays in the Fourth Division, the fifth tier of Norwegian football. It last played in the Norwegian Second Division in 2000. Former players include Per Joar Hansen, Bent Inge Johnsen and Thomas Drage. The pop-duo Marcus & Martinus currently plays for the men's football team.
