= Moss FK =

Norwegian football club

Moss
- Full name: Moss Fotballklubb
- Nickname: Kællane (The Lads)
- Founded: 28 August 1906; 120 years ago
- Ground: Melløs Stadion, Moss
- Capacity: 3200
- Chairman: Torfinn Hansen
- Head coach: Geir Bakke
- League: 1. divisjon
- 2026: 1. divisjon, 13th of 16
Home colours	Away colours

Moss Fotballklubb is a Norwegian football club, founded on 28 August 1906. They play in the 1. divisjon, the second highest division in the Norwegian football league system. They played in the Norwegian top flight between 1937–1939, 1953–54, 1977–1985 (9 seasons), 1987–1990 (4 seasons), 1996 and 1998–2002. The club came close to earning promotion to the top flight in 2024, but lost the play-off against Haugesund.

== Stadium ==
Moss play their home games at Melløs stadion, which has a capacity of around 10,000. Because of national rules of professional license for top clubs in Norway, the stadium has only been certified for 3200 spectators. Built in 1939, it has remained the club's home ground ever since. The record attendance is 10,085, set in 2003 against rivals Fredrikstad. A higher attendance may have been achieved in 1976 in a match against Odd, but no precise figure exists for this match because the gates broke down after around 9500 spectators had shown up.

== Recent history ==
Season		Pos.	Pl.	W	D	L	GS	GA	P	Cup	Notes
2006	1. divisjon	8	30	11	7	12	61	46	40	Third round	
2007	1. divisjon	5	30	15	8	7	46	37	53	Third round	
2008	1. divisjon	9	30	9	12	9	63	54	39	Third round	
2009	1. divisjon	7	30	12	5	13	47	53	41	Second round	
2010	1. divisjon	↓ 15	28	7	5	16	32	56	26	Third round	Relegated
2011	2. divisjon	10	26	11	5	10	58	56	38	First round	
2012	2. divisjon	10	26	8	6	12	43	46	30	Second round	
2013	2. divisjon	9	26	10	3	13	47	53	33	Second round	
2014	2. divisjon	3	26	16	5	5	69	24	53	Second round	
2015	2. divisjon	2	26	18	3	5	65	31	57	First round	
2016	2. divisjon	↓ 11	26	9	8	9	57	55	35	Second round	Relegated
2017	3. divisjon	↑ 1	26	20	3	3	88	22	63	Second round	Promoted
2018	2. divisjon	9	26	7	9	10	37	42	30	Second round	
2019	2. divisjon	8	26	10	4	12	35	46	34	Second round	
2020	2. divisjon	12	13	3	2	8	16	24	11	Cancelled	
2021	2. divisjon	10	26	8	5	13	44	51	29	Third round	
2022	2. divisjon	↑ 1	24	18	2	4	46	23	56	Third round	Promoted
2023	1. divisjon	10	30	10	8	12	37	40	38	Third round	
2024	1. divisjon	3	30	16	5	9	54	41	53	Second round	
2025	1. divisjon	14	30	7	7	16	41	65	28	Third round	
2026 (in progress)	1. divisjon	13	30	9	5	16	44	63	32	Second round	

== Players ==
=== Current squad ===
As of 4 September, 2026

Note: Flags indicate national team as defined under FIFA eligibility rules; some limited exceptions apply. Players may hold more than one non-FIFA nationality.

No.	Pos.	Nation	Player
1	GK	NOR	Mathias Enger Eriksen
2	DF	NOR	Marius Cassidy
3	DF	NOR	Kristian Strande (captain)
4	DF	DEN	Noah Ibsen (on loan from Kristiansund)
5	DF	TUN	Omar Jebali
6	DF	DEN	Mikkel Lassen
7	MF	SWE	Noah Alexandersson (on loan from HamKam)
8	MF	NOR	Håkon Vold Krohg
9	FW	NOR	Oscar Aga
10	FW	SOM	Moussa Njie (on loan from KFUM Oslo)
12	GK	NOR	Mads Rylandsholm
14	MF	NGR	Jamiu Musbaudeen
15	MF	NOR	Aksel Engesvik

No.	Pos.	Nation	Player
16	MF	NOR	Sondre Høydal
17	DF	NOR	Patrik Andersen
18	MF	DEN	Robert Marcus
19	MF	DEN	Lasse Overgaard
20	FW	NOR	Niclas Semmen
21	MF	NOR	Sigurd Grønli
22	FW	NGR	Jerry Ogbole
23	FW	NOR	Robin Hermanstad
24	DF	GAM	Momodou Lion Njie (on loan from KFUM Oslo)
26	DF	NGR	Emmanuel Chidi
27	MF	NOR	Jonas Selnæs
30	GK	NOR	Mathias Skott-Grande
46	DF	NOR	William Kvale

For season transfers, see List of Norwegian football transfers winter 2024–25, and List of Norwegian football transfers summer 2025.

=== Out on loan ===
Note: Flags indicate national team as defined under FIFA eligibility rules; some limited exceptions apply. Players may hold more than one non-FIFA nationality.

No.	Pos.	Nation	Player
4	DF	NOR	Kristoffer Lassen Harrison (at Sogndal)

== Coaching staff ==
Head coach:	Geir Bakke
Assistant Coach:	David Ribeiro
Keeper Coach:	Clas André Guttulsrød

== In European football ==
Season	Competition	Round	Country	Club	Home	Away	Aggregate
1980–81	UEFA Cup	First round	(East Germany)	Magdeburg	2–3	1–2	3–5
1984–85	UEFA Cup Winners' Cup	First round	(Germany)	Bayern Munich	1–2	1–4	2–6
1988–89	European Cup	First round	(Spain)	Real Madrid	0–1	0–3	0–4

== Honours ==
- Norwegian top flight:
  - Gold medal (1): 1987
  - Silver medal (1): 1979
- Norwegian Cup:
  - Winners (1): 1983
  - Runners-up (1): 1981

== Records ==
- Greatest home victory: 15–0 vs. Medkila FK, September 21, 2014
- Greatest away victory: 9–1 vs. Borre IF, May 5, 2004
- Heaviest home loss: 1–6 vs. FK Bodø/Glimt, August 2, 2000
- Heaviest away loss: 0–8 vs. Molde FK, April 21, 1996
- Highest recorded attendance, Melløs stadion: 10,085 vs. Fredrikstad FK, October 26, 2003
- Highest average attendance, season: 5814, 1979
- Most appearances, total: 569, Geir Henæs
- Most appearances, Norwegian top flight: 227, Geir Henæs
- Most goals scored, Norwegian top flight: 78, Geir Henæs
