= Kaare Lindboe =

Norwegian football referee and journalist (1939–2021)

Kaare Inge Lindboe (6 October 1939 – 24 April 2021) was a Norwegian football referee and journalist. He refereed a total of 165 matches in the Norwegian Premier League between 1967 and 1989. He also refereed the 1975 Norwegian Cup final. Internationally, he refereed two international matches in 1979 and 1981. He was later head of the referee's committee in the Norwegian Football Association, and a UEFA delegate. He was also a longtime board member of Stavanger club FK Vidar.

Outside football, Lindboe worked many years as a journalist for Rogalands Avis. He was also known as an avid teetotaler.
