= Melløs Stadion =

Sports venue in Moss, Norway

Coordinates: 59°25′15″N 10°40′17″E

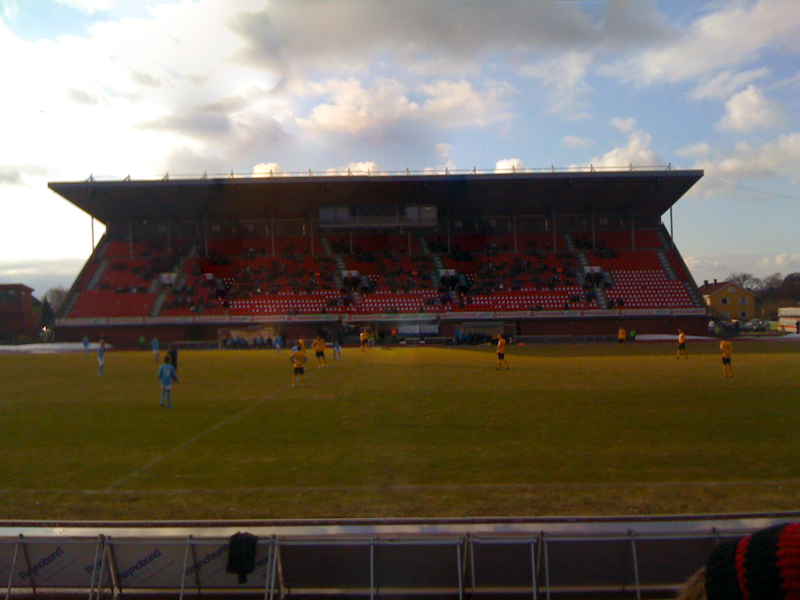
The grandstand

Melløs Stadion is a multi-purpose stadium in Melløs borough in Moss, Norway. It is currently used mostly for football contests and is the home stadium of Moss FK. The stadium has a capacity of 4,117 people and was opened in 1939. The current attendance record is 10,085 people in a neighbor derby against Fredrikstad FK in 2003. The stadium was used for the 1997 UEFA Women's Championship.

The venue has hosted Norway national under-21 football team matches twice, playing 0–0 against Belgium on 11 September 1979 and 0–2 against Denmark on 22 August 2007. Melløs Stadion is also used for athletics. In 1983 it got rubber track as the first stadium in Østfold county, and in 1990 the national athletics championships were held there.

Today Moss FK is planning to renew the stadium to become an intimate football stadium with a capacity of 8,000 people, only seated. Following these plans, the athletics parts of the stadium will be moved to a nearby football training field.

== Eksterne lenker ==
- Melløs Stadion - Nordic Stadiums
