= Vidar Davidsen =

Norwegian footballer and coach (born 1958)

Personal information
- Full name: Vidar Terje Davidsen
- Date of birth: 4 January 1958 (age 68)
- Place of birth: Oslo, Norway
- Position: Midfielder

Youth career
- Bærum

Senior career*
| Years | Team | Apps | (Gls) |
- Bærum
| –1979 | Frigg | | |
| 1980–1986 | Vålerenga | 144 | (37) |
| 1987 | Lillestrøm | 12 | (0) |

International career
| 1974 | Norway U16 | 1 | (0) |
| 1975 | Norway U19 | 5 | (0) |
| 1976–1980 | Norway U21 | 21 | (2) |
| 1979–1986 | Norway | 46 | (5) |

Managerial career
- Bærum
- Strømmen
- 1992: Frigg
- 1993–1997: Vålerenga
- 1998–2001: Lyn
- 2003–2004: Strømsgodset
- * Club domestic league appearances and goals

Vidar Davidsen (born 4 January 1958) is a Norwegian football coach and former player. Davidsen played 46 international matches for Norway and scored 5 goals. One of those goals came in Norway's famous 2-1 win against Italy at Stadio Via del Mare in Lecce in September 1985. He currently works as a football commentator in TV3.

== Career ==
=== Playing career ===
Davidsen started his playing career in Bærum, and had a short spell for Frigg before joining Vålerenga in 1980. Quickly becoming a first team regular, he helped win the Norwegian cup in his debut season. Davidsen and Vålerenga became league champions in 1981, 1983 og 1984.

Davidsen left Vålerenga after the 1986 season, and played one year in their rival club Lillestrøm before he decided to retire.

=== Coaching career ===
After he retired as a player, Bærum appointed him as a coach, and since then he has coached Strømmen, Frigg, Vålerenga, Lyn and Strømsgodset with a variable degree of success.
