= Tom Lund =

Norwegian football player and coach (1950–2026)

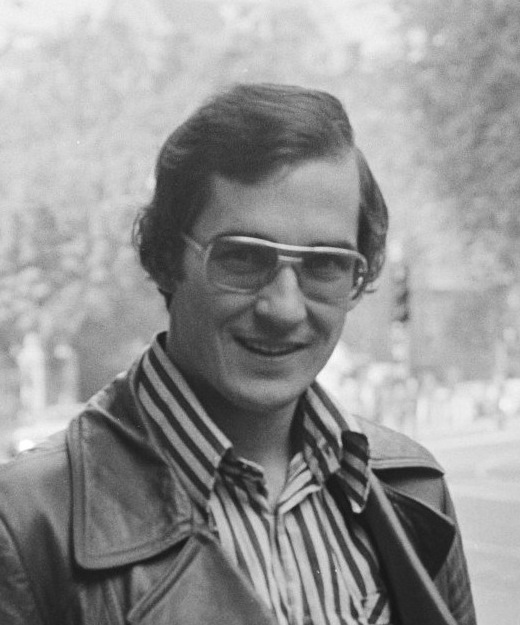
- Lund in 1977

Personal information
- Full name: Tom Arne Lund
- Date of birth: 10 September 1950
- Place of birth: Lillestrøm, Norway
- Date of death: 23 May 2026 (aged 75)
- Position: Forward

Youth career
- Lillestrøm SK

Senior career*
Years	Team	Apps	(Gls)
1967–1982	Lillestrøm SK	274	(154)

International career
1971–1982	Norway	47	(12)

Managerial career
- 1985–1987: Lillestrøm SK
- 1990–1991: Lillestrøm SK
- * Club domestic league appearances and goals

Tom Arne Lund (10 September 1950 – 23 May 2026) was a Norwegian football coach and player. A forward, he played his entire career at Norwegian club Lillestrøm, taking them from the third division to the first and winning the Double. He never played abroad, despite receiving offers from big international clubs. He is widely considered one of the greatest Norwegian football players of all time.

In all official competitions, he played 348 matches and scored 197 goals for Lillestrøm (of which 274 matches and 154 goals were recorded in league competition), helping his club win the Norwegian Cup in 1977, 1978 and 1981, and the Norwegian top division in 1976 and 1977. He retired from football in 1982 while still being regarded as one of the best players in Norwegian football.

Lund won 47 caps with the Norway national team.

== Club career ==
As a youth, Lund was talented in every sport he attempted. He played handball, bandy and ice hockey for the Lillestrøm first teams well into his football career. After winning a local track and field tournament in 1971, he briefly considered practicing decathlon, with the goal of qualifying for the 1976 Olympics. Nonetheless, football was always his main focus.

Lund debuted for the Lillestrøm first team on 7 May 1967 at the age of 16. They played in the third division, and were close to relegation. Lund quickly became considered by far the best player on the team, and one of the best in Norway. He made his debut on the national team in 1971, at the age of 20. Meanwhile, the club kept slowly improving, and spent several years close to promotion.

While in the third division, Lund struggled economically, and received offers from many top Norwegian clubs. But his biggest offer came in 1973 from Ajax, then the best club in Europe, who wanted him to fill the gap left by Johan Cruyff. The negotiations were national news in Norway and in the Netherlands. Lund was offered around 1 million kroner for a two-year contract (equivalent to around 8 million kroner, or €800,000, in 2024), the highest for any Norwegian player at the time. Lund was close to accepting, but eventually declined the offer, in large part because he thought the contract was too long. He later turned down offers from Real Madrid, Leeds United, Middlesbrough, Bayern Munich, and Feyenoord, among others.

In 1973, after seven seasons of playing, Lund and Lillestrøm were finally promoted to the second division. They dominated the 1974 season, losing only a single game to secure promotion to the first division, while reaching the quarter finals in the cup. Lund scored 21 out of 44 goals for the team. They entered the 1975 season as the best team in Norway. After 10 out of 22 matches played, Lillestrøm was in first. However, in their tenth game, against Fredrikstad, Lund tore his ankle. He had to sit out several weeks to get surgery. The team lost every match without Lund. He struggled with injury for the rest of the season, and Lillestrøm placed seventh.

In 1976, when Lund was 26, after ten years at the club, Lillestrøm won the first division. It was the beginning of a golden age for the club. In the 1977 season, with manager Joe Hooley, they won the double, and beat Ajax 2–0 at home in the first round of the European Cup (though they lost 2–4 in the aggregate). Norwegian newspaper VG named Lund player of the year for 1977, together with Helge Karlsen. In 1978, they placed second in the league, but again won the cup, and reached the second round of the European Cup.

He spent most of 1979 and 1980 struggling with injury. There was real fear that Lillestrøm would face relegation without him, but the club still managed a fifth place finish in 1979. In 1980, he could play more games, primarily in the cup, where they reached the final before losing to Vålerenga 1–4, in addition to placing third in the league. Nonetheless, it was considered a disappointing result for the club.

Lund returned in 1981 for arguably his best season. Lillestrøm won the cup, and VG named Lund player of the year. He was also named Norwegian Sportsperson of the Year, the first football player to receive the award. However, with these victories, he also lost the hunger to play. Norwegian football was still not professional, and Lund had a burgeoning business that he wanted to focus on. He remained on the team to help them through a relatively quiet 1982 season, placing fourth in the league, after which he retired at the age of 32.

== Managerial career ==
Lund coached Lillestrøm from 1985 to 1987, and again in 1990. He helped the team win the cup in 1985, and the league in 1986.

== International career ==
Lund was capped 47 times for the Norway national team, including five games as captain, and scored 12 goals. He made his national debut in 1971, while still in the third division, in a 2–1 victory against Iceland. He is widely thought to have scored the equalizing goal in Norway's 2–1 win over England on 9 September 1981, although the goal was credited to Roger Albertsen. Norway did not qualify for any major tournament while Lund played.

He had a severe fear of flying, which was a problem for international games. In fact, out of his 47 international appearances, 31 were home games, and an additional seven were played in Norway's neighboring countries (Sweden, Denmark, Finland). He had an agreement with the management team that he would be excused from international friendlies outside Scandinavia, and would travel by car to away games if he could, including to matches played in Hungary and Bulgaria, respectively during the 1982 World Cup and 1984 European Championship qualifying campaigns. If he had to fly, he would spend the match dreading the flight home.

== Style of play ==
Lund was thin, and fairly short, and was considered weak in the air. But he was renowned for his speed, dribbling, and feints, and especially his first step, which he used to get past any defender. His goal against Mjøndalen in 1976, where he dribbled from the corner, along the edge of the field past five Mjøndalen defenders, before scoring, has been called the greatest goal in Norwegian history.

He was also renowned for his set-pieces. After manager Joe Hooley joined, Lund took every set-piece for Lillestrøm. When they took the Double in 1977, Lillestrøm scored 50 goals from set-pieces, all set by Lund.

Because Lund played his entire career as an amateur in Norway, speculations about his true skill and potential have been popular. He was consistently praised by international opponents: Scottish manager Willie Ormond and Northern-Irish manager Terry Neill both considered him to be good enough for any team in the world. Former Bayern Munich defender Einar Aas placed his skill below Karl-Heinz Rummenigge, but no worse than Kevin Keegan. Former Lillestrøm teammate and Hamburger SV midfielder Erik Solér opined that Lund's set-pieces were no worse than David Beckham, and that he was better at everything else.

== Death ==
Lund died on 23 May 2026, at the age of 75.

Preceded by Bjørg Eva Jensen	Norwegian Sportsperson of the Year; 1981	Succeeded by Berit Aunli
