= List of teams promoted from the Norwegian First Division and predecessors =

A national second tier of Norwegian league football was established in 1963. The league took over for Landsdelsserien, a league consisting of seven regional groups, as the second tier in the Norwegian football league system. The league was named 2. divisjon. After the rebranding of the top tier ahead of the 1990 season, the second tier was rebranded as 1. divisjon in 1991.

== Regional ==
=== 1. divisjon (1948–1951) ===
- Group winners competed in qualification play-offs for four spots in the following season's top division.
- Promoted teams are shown in **bold**.
- Teams marked with an asterisk (*) were not promoted

| Season | I | II A | II B | III | IV A | IV B | V A | V B | VI | VII | VIII |
|---|---|---|---|---|---|---|---|---|---|---|---|
| 1948–49 | **Selbak** | Frigg* | **Strømmen** | Kapp* | **Fram (Larvik)** | Borg* | Jerv* | Djerv 1919* | Årstad* | Molde* | **Ranheim** |
| 1949–50 | **Lisleby** | Geithus* | Solberg* | Hamar* | **Odd** | Larvik Turn* | Start* | Stavanger* | **Brann** | **Kristiansund** | Kvik |
| 1950–51 | Kvik (Halden)* | **Asker** | Geithus* | Gjøvik-Lyn* | **Snøgg** | Larvik Turn* | Flekkefjord* | Ålgård* | **Årstad** | Aalesund* | **Kvik** |

=== Landsdelsserien (1951–1962) ===
- Winners from districts east/south and east/north were promoted to the top division. The remaining five winner qualified for promotion play-offs to compete for two spots in the following season's top division. In the 1961–62 season, only two teams promoted.
- Promoted teams are shown in **bold**.
- Teams marked with an asterisk (*) were not promoted

| Season | East/South | East/North | West/South A | West/South B | West/South C | Møre | Trøndelag |
|---|---|---|---|---|---|---|---|
| 1951–52 | Larvik Turn | Lillestrøm | Flekkefjord* | Ålgård* | **Varegg** | Hødd* | **Ranheim** |
| 1952–53 | Moss | Geithus | Flekkefjord* | Djerv 1919* | **Nordnes** | Langevåg* | **Freidig** |
| 1953–54 | Fram (Larvik) | Vålerengen | Flekkefjord* | Bryne* | **Brann** | Molde* | **Ranheim** |
| 1954–55 | Rapid | Frigg | Jerv* | Bryne* | **Varegg** | Kristiansund* | **Kvik** |
| 1955–56 | Sparta | Strømmen | Start* | Ulf* | **Årstad** | Molde* | **Steinkjer** |
| 1956–57 | Eik | Raufoss | Donn* | Stavanger* | **Brann** | **Molde** | Sverre* |
| 1957–58 | Greåker | Kapp | Jerv* | Stavanger* | **Årstad** | Kristiansund* | **Freidig** |
| 1958–59 | Rapid | Vålerengen | **Start** | Bryne* | Os* | Hødd* | **Brage** |
| 1959–60 | Lisleby | Lyn | Vindbjart* | **Stavanger** | Årstad* | Kristiansund* | **Rosenborg** |
| 1960–61 | Ørn | Frigg | Start* | Ulf* | **Brann** | Langevåg* | **Steinkjer** |
| 1961–62 | Sarpsborg | Gjøvik-Lyn | Start* | Haugar* | Os* | Aalesund* | Kvik* |

== National ==
=== 2. divisjon (1963–1990) ===
- Teams in **bold** were promoted
- Teams marked with an asterisk (*) were not promoted
- Teams in italics were teams from Northern Norway not eligible for promotion at the time.

| Season | Winners Group A | Winners Group B |
|---|---|---|
| 1963 | Sandefjord BK | Raufoss |
| 1964 | Odd | Steinkjer |
| 1965 | Lisleby | Hødd |
| 1966 | Strømsgodset | Rosenborg |
| 1967 | Viking | Brann |
| 1968 | Start | Hødd |
| 1969 | Pors | HamKam |

| Season | Winners Group A | Winners Group B | Winners District IX–X (PO) | Winners District XI (Note: The winners of District XI were never eligible for promotion.) | Play-offs Group A | Play-offs Group B |
|---|---|---|---|---|---|---|
| 1970 | Frigg | Lyn | Mjølner* (Note: The winners of District IX–X was not eligible for promotion in 1970.) | Kirkenes* | — | — |
| 1971 | Mjøndalen | Skeid | **Mjølner** (Note: In the 1971 season, the winner of the District IX–X, Mjølner was directly promoted.) | Kirkenes* | — | — |
| 1972 | Start | Frigg | Mo* | Stein* | Pors* | **Raufoss** |
| 1973 | Sarpsborg FK | Molde | Mjølner* | Kirkenes* | **Vålerengen** | Bryne* |
| 1974 | Os | Lillestrøm | Bodø/Glimt* | Kirkenes* | **Fredrikstad** | Eidsvold Turn* |
| 1975 | Bryne | HamKam | Bodø/Glimt* | Norild* | **Vard** | Odd* |

| Season | Winners Group A | Winners Group B | Winners District IX–XI (PO) | Play-offs Group A | Play-offs Group B |
|---|---|---|---|---|---|
| 1976 | **Moss** | **Vålerengen** | **Bodø/Glimt** | Odd* | Lyn* |

| Season | Winners Group A | Winners Group B | Winners Group C (PO) | Play-offs Group A | Play-offs Group B |
|---|---|---|---|---|---|
| 1977 | **Skeid** | **Lyn** | Mo* | Odd* | **Steinkjer** |
| 1978 | **Mjøndalen** | **Rosenborg** | Tromsø* | Fredrikstad* | **HamKam** |

| Season | Winners Group A | Winners Group B | Play-offs Group A | Play-offs Group B |
|---|---|---|---|---|
| 1979 | Fredrikstad | Lyn | Pors* | **Molde** |
| 1980 | HamKam | Brann | Mjøndalen* | **Haugar** |
| 1981 | Mjøndalen | Sogndal | Pors* | **Molde** |
| 1982 | Kongsvinger | Brann | **Eik** | Steinkjer* |
| 1983 | Fredrikstad | Molde | Pors* | **Strindheim** |
| 1984 | Mjøndalen | Brann | HamKam* | Vidar* |
| 1985 | HamKam | Strømmen | Sogndal* | **Tromsø** |
| 1986 | Moss | Brann | Drøbak/Frogn* | Vidar* |
| 1987 | Sogndal | Strømmen | **Djerv 1919** | Lyn* |
| 1988 | Viking | Mjølner | **Start** | HamKam* |
| 1989 | Fyllingen | Strømsgodset | Djerv 1919* | HamKam* |
| 1990 | Sogndal | Lyn | Bryne* | Eik* |

=== 1. divisjon (1991–) ===
- Teams in **bold** was promoted
- Team marked with an asterisk (*) was not promoted

| Season | Winners Group A | Winners Group B | Play-offs Group A | Play-offs Group B |
|---|---|---|---|---|
| 1991 | Mjøndalen | HamKam | Bryne* | Strindheim* |
| 1992 | Bodø/Glimt | Fyllingen | Drøbak/Frogn* | Strømmen* |
| 1993 | Vålerenga | Sogndal | **Strømsgodset** | Bryne* |
| 1994 | Strindheim | Hødd | **Stabæk** (Note: Due to the expansion of the top division from 12 to 14 teams, both runners-up were automatically promoted this season.) | **Molde** |
| 1995 | Moss | Skeid | Sogndal* | **Strømsgodset** |
| 1996 | Lyn | Haugesund | Odd Grenland* | **Sogndal** |

| Season | Winners | Runners-up | Third (play-off) | Other play-off |
|---|---|---|---|---|
| 1997 | Vålerenga | Moss | Eik-Tønsberg* | — |
| 1998 | Odd Grenland | Skeid | Kjelsås* | — |
| 1999 | Haugesund | Bryne | **Start** | — |
| 2000 | Lyn | Strømsgodset | **Sogndal** | — |
| 2001 | Vålerenga | Start | HamKam* | — |
| 2002 | Tromsø | Aalesund | Sandefjord* | — |
| 2003 | HamKam | Fredrikstad | Sandefjord* | — |
| 2004 | Start | Aalesund | Kongsvinger* | — |
| 2005 | Stabæk | Sandefjord | Moss* | — |
| 2006 | Strømsgodset | Aalesund | Bryne* | — |
| 2007 | Molde | HamKam | **Bodø/Glimt** | — |
| 2008 | Odd Grenland | Sandeford | **Start** (Note: Due to the expansion of the top division from 14 to 16 teams, the third finisher in the 2008 1. divisjon was promoted directly.) | Sogndal* |
| 2009 | Haugesund | Hønefoss | **Kongsvinger** | Sogndal,* Sarpsborg 08* |
| 2010 | Sogndal | Sarpsborg 08 | **Fredrikstad** | Løv-Ham,* Ranheim* |
| 2011 | Hønefoss | Sandnes Ulf | Sandefjord* (Note: No play-offs in 2011) | — |
| 2012 | Start | Sarpsborg 08 | Sandefjord* | Mjøndalen,* Bodø/Glimt,* Ullensaker/Kisa* |
| 2013 | Bodø/Glimt | Stabæk | Hødd* | Ranheim,* HamKam,* Mjøndalen* |
| 2014 | Sandefjord | Tromsø | **Mjøndalen** | Kristiansund,* Bærum,* Fredrikstad* |
| 2015 | Sogndal | Brann | Kristiansund* | Hødd,* Jerv,* Ranheim* |
| 2016 | Kristiansund | Sandefjord | Jerv* | Sandnes Ulf,* Kongsvinger,* Mjøndalen* |
| 2017 | Bodø/Glimt | Start | Mjøndalen* | **Ranheim**, Sandnes Ulf,* Ullensaker/Kisa* |
| 2018 | Viking | Mjøndalen | Aalesund* | Sogndal,* Ullensaker/Kisa,* Nest-Sotra* |
| 2019 | Aalesund | Sandefjord | **Start** | KFUM Oslo,* Kongsvinger,* Sogndal* |
| 2020 | Tromsø | Lillestrøm | Sogndal* | Ranheim,* Åsane,* Raufoss* |

== Number of titles ==
This lists national league winners only. Clubs in bold are competing in 1. divisjon as of the current season.

=== Overall ===
The winners of Landsdelsserien (1951–1962) and the district groups (1970–1976) are not included.

- 6 wins: **HamKam**, Lyn, **Sogndal**
- 5 wins: Brann, Mjøndalen
- 4 wins: **Start**, Vålerenga
- 3 wins: Odd, Hødd, Strømsgodset, Skeid, Molde, Moss, Bodø/Glimt, Haugesund, Viking, Tromsø
- 2 wins: Rosenborg, Frigg, **Fredrikstad**, **Strømmen**, Fyllingen
- 1 win: Sandefjord BK, **Raufoss**, Steinkjer, Lisleby, Pors, Sarpsborg FK, Os, Lillestrøm, **Bryne**, Mo, Kongsvinger, Mjølner, Strindheim, Stabæk, Hønefoss, Sandefjord, Kristiansund, **Aalesund**

=== In the current one-conference system (1997–) ===
- 2 wins: Vålerenga, Odd, Haugesund, **Start**, **Sogndal**, Bodø/Glimt, Tromsø
- 1 win: Lyn, **HamKam**, Stabæk, Strømsgodset, Molde, Hønefoss, Sandefjord, Kristiansund, Viking, **Aalesund**
