= List of Lyn Fotball seasons =

Seasons played by a Norwegian football club

This is a list of seasons played by Lyn Fotball in Norwegian and European football, regional and test league seasons from 1915 to 1937 and national league seasons from the 1937–38 season to the most recent completed season. It details the club's achievements in major competitions, and the top scorers for some season. The statistics is up to date as of the end of the 2025 season.

This list is under construction.

== 1963–present ==
Season	League										Cup	Other competitions					Top goalscorer		Ref(s)
Season	Division (Gr.)	P	W	D	L	GF	GA	GD	Pts	Pos	Cup	Other	CL	EL	ECL	CWC	Name	Goals	Ref(s)
1963	1. divisjon	18	10	3	5	38	28	+10	23	2nd	QF	—	1R	—N/a	—N/a	—	Ole Stavrum	11	
1964	1. divisjon	18	10	6	2	39	16	+23	26	1st	3R	—	1R	—N/a	—N/a	—	Ole Stavrum	18	
1965	1. divisjon	18	12	2	4	57	22	+35	26	2nd	SF	—	1R	—N/a	—N/a	—	Harald Berg	19	
1966	1. divisjon	18	6	9	3	28	24	+4	21	3rd	2nd	—	—	—N/a	—N/a	—	Ole Stavrum	17	
1967	1. divisjon	18	9	3	6	39	30	+9	25	3rd	W	1R	—	—N/a	—N/a	—	Harald Berg	14	
1968	1. divisjon	18	14	0	4	57	33	+24	28	1st	W	—	—	—N/a	—N/a	QF	Ola Dybwad-Olsen	25	
1969	1. divisjon	18	4	4	10	21	39	−18	12	↓ 10th	3R	—	1R	—N/a	—N/a	—	Ola Dybwad-Olsen	8	
1970	2. divisjon (B)	14	11	2	1	33	7	+26	24	↑ 1st	2nd	—	—	—N/a	—N/a	—	Trygve Christophersen	11	
1971	1. divisjon	18	9	5	4	28	17	+11	23	2nd	4R	—	—	—	—N/a	1R	Ola Dybwad-Olsen	9	
1972	1. divisjon	22	7	7	8	29	22	+7	21	5th	3R	—	—	1R	—N/a	—	Trygve Christophersen	7	
1973	1. divisjon	22	5	6	11	23	31	−8	16	↓ 11th	2R	—	—	—	—N/a	—	Aasmund Sandland	7	
1974	2. divisjon (B)	18	7	8	3	33	15	+18	22	3rd	2R	—	—	—	—N/a	—	Ola Dybwad-Olsen	11	
1975	2. divisjon (A)	18	11	3	4	38	16	+22	25	3rd	2R	—	—	—	—N/a	—	Ola Dybwad-Olsen	11	
1976	2. divisjon (B)	18	10	5	3	34	17	+17	25	2nd	2R	—	—	—	—N/a	—	Ola Dybwad-Olsen	17	
1977	2. divisjon (B)	18	12	1	5	38	14	+24	25	↑ 1st	3R	—	—	—	—N/a	—	Rune Solvåg	17	
1978	1. divisjon	22	3	5	14	23	53	−30	11	↓ 11th	4R	—	—	—	—N/a	—	Ola Dybwad-Olsen	7	
1979	2. divisjon (B)	22	17	4	1	40	11	+29	38	↑ 1st	4R	—	—	—	—N/a	—	Rune Solvåg	18	
1980	1. divisjon	22	8	3	11	26	43	−17	19	9th	3R	—	—	—	—N/a	—	Kjell Ødegaard	5	
1981	1. divisjon	22	4	5	13	22	37	−15	13	↓ 12th	4R	—	—	—	—N/a	—	Kjell Ødegaard; Per Gunnar Bredesen	4	
1982	2. divisjon (A)	22	9	7	6	25	25	0	25	4th	2R	—	—	—	—N/a	—	Øystein Kruge	10	
1983	2. divisjon (B)	22	9	6	7	28	29	−1	24	5th	3R	—	—	—	—N/a	—	Harald Eibakk	9	
1984	2. divisjon (A)	22	5	2	15	21	49	−28	12	↓ 12th	1R	—	—	—	—N/a	—	Bernt Haugen	7	
1985	3. divisjon (A)	22	9	5	8	36	32	+4	23	6th	2R	—	—	—	—N/a	—	Bernt Haugen	6	
1986	3. divisjon (B)	22	14	3	5	45	26	+19	31	↑ 1st	3R	—	—	—	—N/a	—	Four players	6	
1987	2. divisjon (A)	22	11	7 (Note: In drawn games in the 1987 season, one point were awarded to the winner of a penalty shoot-out. Lyn drew seven games of which they won two and lost five on penalties.)	4	38	29	+9	42	2nd	1R	—	—	—	—N/a	—	Simen Agdestein	8	
1988	2. divisjon (A)	22	11	4	7	54	35	+19	37	4th	2R	—	—	—	—N/a	—	Simen Agdestein	13	
1989	2. divisjon (B)	22	10	4	8	33	27	+6	34	5th	1R	—	—	—	—N/a	—	Atle Ulrichsen	7	
1990	2. divisjon (B)	22	14	3	5	50	23	+27	45	↑ 1st	4R	—	—	—	—N/a	—	Tom Fodstad	18	
1991	Tippeligaen	22	8	10	4	26	26	0	34	4th	4R	—	—	—	—N/a	—	Tom Fodstad	7	
1992	Tippeligaen	22	11	4	7	33	29	+4	37	5th	4R	—	—	—	—N/a	—	Stein Amundsen	8	
1993	Tippeligaen	22	6	4	12	39	53	−14	22	↓ 11th	1R	—	—	—	—N/a	—	Kjell Roar Kaasa	13	
1994	1. divisjon (1)	22	10	4	8	35	24	+11	34	5th	2nd	—	—	—	—N/a	—	Tommy Bergersen	8	
1995	1. divisjon (2)	22	11	1	10	31	29	+2	34	6th	QF	—	—	—	—N/a	—	Axel Kolle	11	
1996	1. divisjon (1)	22	15	4	3	53	17	+36	49	↑ 1st	3R	—	—	—	—N/a	—	Jo Tessem	15	
1997	Tippeligaen	26	4	5	17	28	58	−30	17	↓ 13th	3R	—	—	—	—N/a	—	Jo Tessem	8	
1998	1. divisjon	26	9	9	8	44	26	+18	36	9th	3R	—	—	—	—N/a	—	Tommy Nilsen	16	
1999	1. divisjon	26	11	9	6	54	30	+24	42	4th	QF	—	—	—	—N/a	—N/a	Tommy Nilsen	14	
2000	1. divisjon	26	19	4	3	55	24	+29	61	↑ 1st	4R	—	—	—	—N/a	—N/a	Espen Haug	12	
2001	Tippeligaen	26	6	8	12	40	49	−9	26	11th	2R	—	—	—	—N/a	—N/a	Jóhann Guðmundsson	7	
2002	Tippeligaen	26	14	5	7	36	29	+7	47	3rd	QF	—	—	—	—N/a	—N/a	Ole Bjørn Sundgot	8	
2003	Tippeligaen	26	8	6	12	34	45	−11	30	10th	4R	—	—	R1	—N/a	—N/a	Ole Bjørn Sundgot	8	
2004	Tippeligaen	26	9	10	7	30	31	−1	37	6th	2nd	—	—	—	—N/a	—N/a	Jan-Derek Sørensen	9	
2005	Tippeligaen	26	12	8	6	37	24	+13	44	3rd	3R	QF	—	—	—N/a	—N/a	Jo Tessem	8	
2006	Tippeligaen	26	10	5	11	33	36	−3	35	7th	4R	—	—	1QR	—N/a	—N/a	Chinedu Obasi	8	
2007	Tippeligaen	26	10	4	12	43	46	−3	34	9th	QF	—	—	—	—N/a	—N/a	Espen Hoff	6	
2008	Tippeligaen	26	11	5	10	38	34	+4	38	7th	QF	—	—	—	—N/a	—N/a	Espen Hoff	10	
2009	Tippeligaen	30	2	10	18	29	59	−30	16	↓ 16th	4R	—	—	—	—N/a	—N/a	Diego Guastavino	7	
2010	6. divisjon (3) (Note: Lyn was declared bankruptcy on 30 June 2010, following an extended period of financial distress, and withdrew from the 1. divisjon on 7 July 2010. Pursuant to the rules and regulations of the competition, all games involving Lyn have been annulled and the team placed at the bottom of the standings. Later the club was moved to the 6. divisjon.)	18	14	1	3	87	28	+59	43	↑ 1st	3R	—	—	—	—N/a	—N/a	Vegard Vinje	14	
2011	4. divisjon (1)	20	20	0	0	106	10	+96	60	↑ 1st	DNQ	—	—	—	—N/a	—N/a	Andreas Nielsen	25	
2012	3. divisjon (3)	24	21	1	2	100	13	+87	64	↑ 1st	1R	—	—	—	—N/a	—N/a	Birger Rasmussen	27	
2013	2. divisjon (2)	26	11	8	7	47	32	+15	41	4th	2R	—	—	—	—N/a	—N/a	Andreas Moen	8	
2014	2. divisjon (3)	26	9	5	12	42	42	0	32	10th	3R	—	—	—	—N/a	—N/a	Armin Sistek	15	
2015	2. divisjon (1)	26	7	4	15	41	64	−23	25	↓ 12th	1R	—	—	—	—N/a	—N/a	Birger Rasmussen; Moses Mawa	6	
2016	3. divisjon (2)	26	20	5	1	69	20	+49	65	1st	1R	—	—	—	—N/a	—N/a	Fadel Karbon	11	
2017	3. divisjon (2)	26	20	3	3	71	35	+36	62	2nd	1R	—	—	—	—N/a	—N/a	Anwar Pellegrino	12	
2018	3. divisjon (6)	26	17	2	7	74	40	+34	53	3rd	1R	—	—	—	—N/a	—N/a	Anwar Pellegrino	16	
2019	3. divisjon (2)	26	11	6	9	57	45	+12	39	6th	1R	—	—	—	—N/a	—N/a	Jonas Aleksander Bakken	10	
2020	3. divisjon (4)	Season cancelled due to the COVID-19 pandemic										—	—	—	—N/a	—N/a			
2021	3. divisjon (4)	13	6	5	2	32	20	+12	23	4th	1R	—	—	—	—	—N/a	Henrik Elvevold	7	
2022	3. divisjon (1)	26	22	4	0	88	24	+66	70	↑ 1st	1R	—	—	—	—	—N/a	David Tavakoli	26	
2023	2. divisjon (1)	26	20	2	4	74	23	+51	62	↑ 2nd	2R	—	—	—	—	—N/a	Andreas Hellum	15	
2024	1. divisjon	30	12	10	8	56	40	+16	46	5th (Note: Lost the promotion play-offs.)	2R	—	—	—	—	—N/a	Anders Bjørntvedt Olsen	11	
2025	1. divisjon	30	14	5	11	48	37	+11	47	7th	3R	—	—	—	—	—N/a	Andreas Hellum	15	
2026	1. divisjon	30	10	4	16	46	61	–15	34	11th	3R	—	—	—	—	—N/a	Andreas Hellum	17	
