= 1980 in Norwegian football =

Football in Norway
- Season: 1980

Men's football
- 1. divisjon: Start
- 2. divisjon: HamKam (Group A); Brann (Group B)
- Cupen: Vålerengen

Women's football
- Cupen: BUL

The 1980 season was the 75th season of competitive football in Norway.

== Men's football ==
=== League season ===
==== Promotion and relegation ====
League	Promoted to league	Relegated from league
1. divisjon	Fredrikstad; Lyn; Molde	HamKam; Mjøndalen; Brann
2. divisjon	Harstad; Kongsvinger; Kvik Halden; Ørn; Kopervik; Kristiansund	Aalesund; Vigør; Vigrestad; Fram Larvik; Stjørdals-Blink; Tromsø

==== 1. divisjon ====
Start won the championship, their second league title.

Pos	Team	Pld	W	D	L	GF	GA	GD	Pts	Qualification or relegation
1	Start (C)	22	13	3	6	52	26	+26	29	Qualification for the European Cup first round
2	Bryne	22	12	5	5	44	22	+22	29	Qualification for the UEFA Cup first round
3	Lillestrøm	22	10	7	5	36	25	+11	27	
4	Viking	22	10	5	7	34	27	+7	25	
5	Rosenborg	22	9	5	8	42	36	+6	23	
6	Moss	22	8	7	7	33	27	+6	23	
7	Fredrikstad	22	9	5	8	35	39	−4	23	
8	Vålerengen	22	6	8	8	26	26	0	20	Qualification for the Cup Winners' Cup first round
9	Lyn	22	8	3	11	26	43	−17	19	
10	Molde (R)	22	6	6	10	30	39	−9	18	Relegation to Second Division
11	Skeid (R)	22	4	8	10	21	39	−18	16	Relegation to Second Division
12	Bodø/Glimt (R)	22	5	2	15	13	43	−30	12	Relegation to Second Division

Source: NIFS
Rules for classification: 1) points; 2) goal difference; 3) number of goals scored.
(C) Champions; (R) Relegated

==== 2. divisjon ====
===== Group A =====
Pos	Team	Pld	W	D	L	GF	GA	GD	Pts	Promotion, qualification or relegation
1	HamKam (C, P)	22	14	6	2	29	10	+19	34	Promotion to First Division
2	Mjøndalen	22	11	5	6	32	23	+9	27	Qualification for the promotion play-offs
3	Kvik Halden	22	11	4	7	27	25	+2	26	
4	Mjølner	22	8	8	6	22	22	0	24	
5	Odd	22	10	3	9	24	25	−1	23	
6	Kongsvinger	22	7	8	7	29	25	+4	22	
7	Pors	22	7	7	8	26	28	−2	21	
8	Ørn	22	5	10	7	22	22	0	20	
9	Raufoss	22	7	5	10	29	34	−5	19	
10	Frigg (R)	22	5	9	8	22	28	−6	19	Relegation to Third Division
11	Sarpsborg FK (R)	22	6	4	12	19	28	−9	16	Relegation to Third Division
12	Harstad (R)	22	3	7	12	15	26	−11	13	Relegation to Third Division

Source: rsssf.no
Rules for classification: 1) points; 2) goal difference; 3) number of goals scored.
(C) Champions; (P) Promoted; (R) Relegated

===== Group B =====
Pos	Team	Pld	W	D	L	GF	GA	GD	Pts	Promotion, qualification or relegation
1	Brann (C, P)	22	14	6	2	40	21	+19	34	Promotion to First Division
2	Haugar (O, P)	22	11	6	5	33	19	+14	28	Qualification for the promotion play-offs
3	Mo	22	9	8	5	27	18	+9	26	
4	Steinkjer	22	11	3	8	48	34	+14	25	
5	Kristiansund	22	10	5	7	39	30	+9	25	
6	Sogndal	22	11	3	8	37	30	+7	25	
7	Kopervik	22	9	5	8	35	31	+4	23	
8	Vard	22	6	9	7	27	32	−5	21	
9	Nessegutten	22	6	7	9	24	36	−12	19	
10	Strindheim (R)	22	7	3	12	28	35	−7	17	Relegation to Third Division
11	Hødd (R)	22	4	4	14	30	49	−19	12	Relegation to Third Division
12	Os (R)	22	2	5	15	17	50	−33	9	Relegation to Third Division

Source: rsssf.no
Rules for classification: 1) points; 2) goal difference; 3) number of goals scored.
(C) Champions; (O) Play-off winners; (P) Promoted; (R) Relegated

=== Norwegian Cup ===
==== Final ====
26 October 1980

Vålerengen	4–1	Lillestrøm
Haugen 34', 42'; Olsen 38' (pen.); Jacobsen 80'	Report	V. Hansen 15'

Ullevaal Stadion, Oslo
Attendance: 23,000
Referee: Einar Halle (Molde)

== Women's football ==
=== Norwegian Women's Cup ===
==== Final ====
- BUL 1–1 (a.e.t.) Trondheims-Ørn

Replay

- BUL 2–0 Trondheims-Ørn

== UEFA competitions ==
=== European Cup ===
==== First round ====
Team 1	Agg.	Team 2	1st leg	2nd leg
Viking (Norway)	3–7	(Socialist Federal Republic of Yugoslavia) Red Star Belgrade	2–3	1–4

=== European Cup Winners' Cup ===
==== First round ====
Team 1	Agg.	Team 2	1st leg	2nd leg
Sion (Switzerland)	1–3	(Norway) Haugar	1–1	0–2

==== Second round ====
Team 1	Agg.	Team 2	1st leg	2nd leg
Haugar (Norway)	0–6	(Wales) Newport County	0–0	0–6

=== UEFA Cup ===
==== First round ====
Team 1	Agg.	Team 2	1st leg	2nd leg
Magdeburg (East Germany)	5–3	(Norway) Moss	2–1 (Report)	3–2 (Report)

== National teams ==
=== Norway men's national football team ===
==== Results ====
22 May Match 410	Norway	1–0	Bulgaria	Oslo, Norway

4 June Match 411	Denmark	3–1	Norway	Copenhagen, Denmark

14 July Match 412	Norway	3–1	Iceland	Oslo, Norway

21 August Match 413	Norway	6–1	Finland	Oslo, Norway

10 September Match 414	England	4–0	Norway	London, England

24 September Match 415	Norway	1–1	Romania	Oslo, Norway

21 August Match 416	Switzerland	1–2	Norway	Bern, Switzerland

=== Norway women's national football team ===
==== Results ====
Source:
