= Battle of Oslo (football) =

Football rivalry in Oslo, Norway

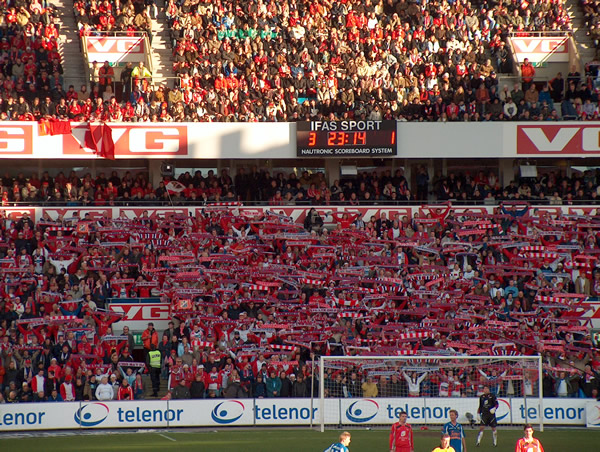
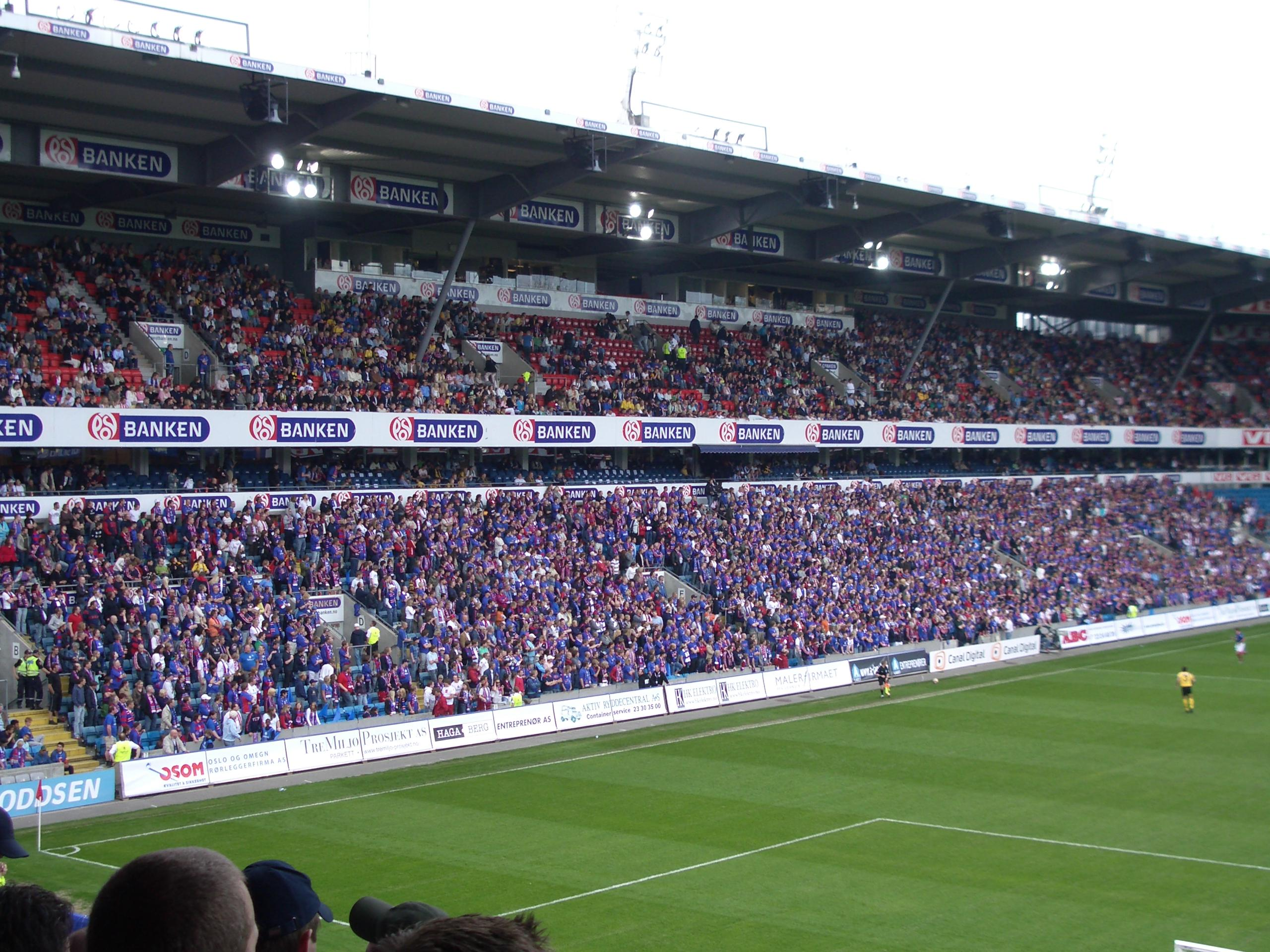
- Lyn fans (top) and VIF fans (bottom)
- Other names: Kampen om Oslo; The Oslo Derby
- Location: Oslo, Norway
- Teams: Lyn; Vålerenga
- First meeting: 5 March 1922; 4–1 win for Lyn
- Latest meeting: Vålerenga 4–2 Lyn; 2024 1. divisjon (24 August 2024)

Statistics
- Total meetings: 778
- Most wins: Lyn (34)
- All-time series: Lyn: 34; Drawn: 17; Vålerenga: 27
- Largest victory: 7–0 win for Lyn (4 June 1924)

Location of both teams

The Battle of Oslo (Norwegian: Kampen om Oslo) or the Oslo Derby is the name given to football matches between Lyn Fotball and Vålerenga Fotball, both of them from Oslo, the capital of Norway.

The league match at Ullevaal stadion in April 2024 notably broke the attendance record for the Norwegian First Division. The standing record was 17,284, a number that was surpassed by pre-match ticket sales already two weeks ahead of the match. The figure ended at 25,103, far exceeding the former record.

== Official statistics ==
Official statistics of honours won by Lyn and Vålerenga, as treated by the Football Association of Norway (NFF).

Club	Eliteserien		Norwegian Football Cup		Total
Club	Total	Seasons	Total	Seasons	Total
Lyn	2	1964, 1968	8	1908, 1909, 1910, 1911, 1945, 1946, 1967, 1968	10
Vålerenga	5	1965, 1981, 1983, 1984, 2005	4	1980, 1997, 2002, 2008	9

== Matches list ==
=== League ===
==== 1922–1937 ====
Note: The host of the matches between 1922 and 1937 was unknown

Season	Division	Date	Venue	Score
1922	Kretsserien	05–03–1922	Bislett Stadium	4–1 for Lyn
1923	Kretsserien	12–06–1923	Dælenenga idrettspark	2–0 for Vålerenga
1924	Kretsserien	04–06–1924	Frogner Stadion	7–0 for Lyn
1925	Kretsserien	30–06–1925	Vestre Holmen	2–1 for Vålerenga
1926	Kretsserien	04–07–1926	Vestre Holmen	3–0 for Lyn
1927	Kretsserien	03–05–1927	Bislett Stadium	5–3 for Lyn
1927–28	Østlandsligaen; Hovedserien	19–06–1928	Frogner Stadion	2–1 for Vålerenga
1929	Kretsserien	08–09–1929	Ullevaal Stadion	0–0 draw
1930	Kretsserien	22–05–1930	Bislett Stadium	4–0 for Lyn
1931	Kretsserien	24–06–1931	Ullevaal Stadion	3–2 for Vålerenga
1932	Kretsserien	28–06–1932	Ullevaal Stadion	1–1 draw
1933	Kretsserien	09–08–1933	Frogner Stadion	4–2 for Vålerenga
1934	Kretsserien	16–08–1934	Bislett Stadium	4–1 for Lyn
1935	Kretsserien	18–06–1935	Frogner Stadion	2–1 for Lyn
1936	Kretsserien	22–06–1936	Ullevaal Stadion	2–0 for Lyn
1937	Kretsserien	30–04–1937	Frogner Stadion	2–1 for Lyn
1937	Kretsserien	24–08–1937	Bislett Stadium	3–2 for Lyn

==== 1938–present ====
		Lyn – Vålerenga				Vålerenga – Lyn			
Season	Division	Date	Venue	Atten.	Score	Date	Venue	Atten.	Score
1938–39	Norgesserien	08–08–1938	Ullevaal Stadion	200	1–1	25–09–1938	Bislett Stadium	1,836	0–3
1939–40	Norgesserien	07–08–1939	Ullevaal Stadion	1,200	6–0				
1946–47	Kretsserien	18–08–1946	Ullevaal Stadion	17,000	4–2	12–05–1947	Ullevaal Stadion	13,500	0–0
1949–50	Hovedserien	04–09–1949	Ullevaal Stadion	9,233	2–3	10–05–1950	Bislett Stadium	11,285	0–1
1953–54	Landsdelsserien	22–08–1953	Ullevaal Stadion	6,529	1–2	21–05–1954	Bislett Stadium	10,191	1–0
1957–58	Landsdelsserien	27–04–1958	Ullevaal Stadion	2,000	0–3	09–05–1958	Bislett Stadium	2,917	2–1
1958–59	Landsdelsserien	29–05–1959	Ullevaal Stadion	9,741	1–1	20–09–1958	Bislett Stadium	2,159	3–0
1960–61	Hovedserien					14–06–1961	Bislett Stadium	5,474	6–4
1961–62	Hovedserien	19–08–1962	Ullevaal Stadion	6,044	1–6	08–10–1961	Bislett Stadium	5,382	3–3
1963	1. divisjon	25–08–1963	Ullevaal Stadion	7,417	5–1	23–05–1963	Bislett Stadium	16,653	1–2
1964	1. divisjon	25–09–1964	Bislett Stadium	2,745	2–3	12–06–1964	Bislett Stadium	10,065	0–0
1965	1. divisjon	14–05–1965	Bislett Stadium	17,063	2–2	26–08–1965	Bislett Stadium	13,863	1–7
1966	1. divisjon	17–10–1966	Bislett Stadium	3,562	1–1	16–06–1966	Bislett Stadium	10,811	3–0
1967	1. divisjon	22–05–1967	Ullevaal Stadion	6,836	1–2	05–06–1967	Bislett Stadium	9,737	4–2
1968	1. divisjon	05–10–1968	Ullevaal Stadion	4,957	2–0	05–06–1968	Bislett Stadium	7,557	1–3
1970	2. divisjon	16–05–1970	Ullevaal Stadion	2,591	1–0	20–08–1970	Bislett Stadium	2,082	0–0
1976	2. divisjon	10–06–1976	Ullevaal Stadion	3,132	2–0	19–09–1976	Bislett Stadium	6,315	1–0
1978	1. divisjon	07–08–1978	Ullevaal Stadion	4,664	2–2	27–04–1978	Bislett Stadium	9,241	4–0
1980	1. divisjon	27–05–1980	Ullevaal Stadion	2,939	1–0	05–09–1980	Bislett Stadium	2,130	0–2
1981	1. divisjon	29–07–1981	Ullevaal Stadion	9,699	2–4	26–04–1981	Bislett Stadium	10,664	3–0
2002	Tippeligaen	24–08–2002	Ullevaal Stadion	12,868	1–0	11–05–2002	Ullevaal Stadion	18,374	1–2
2003	Tippeligaen	30–06–2003	Ullevaal Stadion	14,156	1–1	26–10–2003	Ullevaal Stadion	16,639	0–1
2004	Tippeligaen	19–04–2004	Ullevaal Stadion	16,014	1–1	26–07–2004	Ullevaal Stadion	20,477	1–2
2005	Tippeligaen	12–06–2005	Ullevaal Stadion	15,268	1–1	02–10–2005	Ullevaal Stadion	17,888	0–1
2006	Tippeligaen	17–04–2006	Ullevaal Stadion	16,049	2–1	22–07–2006	Ullevaal Stadion	11,855	1–2
2007	Tippeligaen	21–10–2007	Ullevaal Stadion	20,152	3–1	20–06–2007	Ullevaal Stadion	19,468	0–0
2008	Tippeligaen	01–06–2008	Ullevaal Stadion	18,012	2–0	15–09–2008	Ullevaal Stadion	16,332	1–2
2009	Tippeligaen	21–05–2009	Ullevaal Stadion	14,048	4–4	20–09–2009	Ullevaal Stadion	13,466	4–1
2024	1. divisjon	20–04–2024	Ullevaal Stadion	25,103	1–1	24–08–2024	Intility Arena	16,556	4–2

• Total: Lyn 33 wins, 17 draws, Vålerenga 23 wins.

=== Cup ===
Season	Round	Date	Venue	Attendance	Match	Score
1967	Semi-final	01–10–1967	Ullevaal Stadion	13,847	Lyn – Vålerenga	4–0
2012	First round	01–05–2012	Bislett Stadium	11,273	Lyn – Vålerenga	1–2
2014	Third round	04–06–2014	Ullevaal Stadion	7,387	Vålerenga – Lyn	5–2
2021	First round	25–07–2021	Bislett Stadium	2,651	Lyn – Vålerenga	0–4
2023	Second round	01–06–2023	Bislett Stadium	7,777	Lyn – Vålerenga	1–2

• Total: Vålerenga 4, Lyn 1.

== Head-to-head ==
=== Statistics ===
The head-to-head statistics shows the results of Lyn and Vålerenga, when they played against each other in the Norwegian League or Cup.

	Lyn wins	Draws	Vålerenga wins
Top-tier
At Lyn home	8	8	5
At Vålerenga home	12	3	6
Total	20	11	11
Second-tier
At Lyn home	2	2	2
At Vålerenga home	0	1	5
Total	2	3	6
Kretsserien/Østlandsligaen
	11	3	5
Cup
At Lyn home	1	0	3
At Vålerenga home	0	0	1
Total	1	0	4
Total
	34	17	27

=== Ranking ===
The head-to-head ranking table shows the results of Lyn and Vålerenga, when they played in the same league.

P.	49-50	53-54^{2}	57-58^{2}	58-59^{2}	60-61^{3}	61-62	1963	1964	1965	1966	1967	1968	1970^{2}	1976^{2}	1978	1980	1981	2002	2003	2004	2005	2006	2007	2008	2009	2024^{2}
1		1		1				1	1			1	1	1			1				1					1
2			2				2		2					2						2						
3		3	3	3	3					3	3							3			3	3				
4	4				4																					
5	5					5				5	5															5
6						6		6							6					6						
7																						7	7	7	7	
8							8						8			8		8								
9																9							9			
10												10							10					10		
11															11											
12																	12		12							
13																										
14																										
15																										
16																									16	

• Total: Vålerenga 15 times higher, Lyn 11 times higher.

Notes:
^{1} The ranking table does not include the tables of Kretsserien, Østlandsligaen and the 1939–40 season of Norgesserien which was interrupted due to the World War II.
^{2} Both clubs played in the second tier.
^{3} In the 1960–61 season Vålerenga defeated Lyn in the bronze final.

== Records and statistics ==
- First competitive meeting: 4–1 win for Lyn, Kretsserien, 5 March 1922
- First league meeting: Lyn 1–1 Vålerenga, Norgesserien, 8 August 1938
- First Norwegian Cup meeting: Lyn 4–0 Vålerenga, semi-final, 1 October 1967
- First away victory for Lyn: 3–0 vs Vålerenga, Norgesserien, 25 September 1938
- First away victory for Vålerenga: 3–2 vs Lyn, Norgesserien, 4 September 1949
- Highest scoring game: Vålerenga 6–4 Lyn, Hovedserien bronze final, 14 June 1961
- Largest winning margin (Lyn): 7 goals – 7–0 vs Vålerenga, Kretsserien, 4 June 1924
- Largest winning margin (Vålerenga): 5 goals – 6–1 vs Lyn, Hovedserien, 19 August 1962
- Most consecutive wins (Vålerenga): 6, 4 September 1949 – 20 September 1958
- Most consecutive wins (Lyn): 5, 16 August 1934 – 24 August 1937
- Longest undefeated run (Lyn): 15 – 10 wins and 5 draws over 11 May 2002 to 21 May 2009
- Longest undefeated run (Vålerenga): 9 – 7 wins and 2 draws over 22 August 1953 to 19 August 1962
- Most games played against each other in a season: 3, in the 1967 season

=== Doubles ===
Lyn have achieved the double in six seasons (most recently in the 2008 season), while Vålerenga have managed to win both league matches in four seasons (most recently in the 1981 season).

==== Lyn doubles ====
Season	Home	Away
1963	2–1	5–1
1968	3–1	2–0
1980	1–0	2–0
2002	2–1	1–0
2006	2–1	2–1
2008	2–0	2–1

==== Vålerenga doubles ====
Season	Home	Away
1953–54	2–1	1–0
1957–58	3–0	2–1
1967	2–1	4–2
1981	3–0	4–2

=== Top scorers ===
This is the list of top scoring players in the derby (since 2002).

3 goals

- (Nigeria) Odion Ighalo
- (Norway) Bengt Sæternes

2 goals

- (Sweden) Henrik Dahl
- (Norway) Christian Grindheim
- (Norway) David Hanssen
- (Norway) Kristofer Hæstad
- (Norway) Espen Hoff
- (Norway) Kim Holmen
- (Sweden) Peter Markstedt
- (Argentina) Lucas Pratto
- (Jamaica) Luton Shelton
- (Norway) Ole Bjørn Sundgot

== Players in both teams ==
Players from Lyn to Vålerenga

- (Norway) Kent Bergersen
- (Norway) Lars Bohinen
- (Norway) Øyvind Bolthof (for Lyn in youth days)
- (Norway) Stein Gran
- (Norway) Ronny Johnsen
- (Norway) Kjell Roar Kaasa
- (Norway) Jan-Derek Sørensen
- (Norway) Per Egil Swift
- (Norway) Kjetil Wæhler

Players from Vålerenga to Lyn

- (Norway) Shåresh Ahmadi
- (Norway) Tommy Berntsen
- (Norway) Tor Brevik
- (Norway) (Ivory Coast) Adama Diomande (for Vålerenga in youth days)
- (Norway) Stein Gran
- (Norway) Espen Haug
- (Norway) Ibba Laajab
- (Norway) Kjetil Løvvik
- (Norway) Viggo Strømme
- (Norway) Steinar Strømnes

Managers for both teams

- (Norway) Henning Berg (for Vålerenga as player)
- (Norway) Vidar Davidsen
- (Norway) Kristian Henriksen (for Lyn as player)
- (Sweden) Olle Nordin
- (Norway) Egil "Drillo" Olsen
- (Norway) Knut Osnes

== Women's football ==
=== Official statistics ===
Official statistics of honours won by Lyn and Vålerenga, as treated by the Football Association of Norway (NFF).

Club	Toppserien		Norwegian Women's Cup		Total
Club	Total	Seasons	Total	Seasons	Total
Lyn	0		0		0
Vålerenga	3	2020, 2023, 2024	4	2020, 2021, 2024, 2025	5

=== Matches list ===
==== League ====
		Lyn – Vålerenga				Vålerenga – Lyn			
Season	Division	Date	Venue	Atten.	Score	Date	Venue	Atten.	Score
2018	Toppserien	02–05–2018	Kringsjå kunstgress	420	1–1	01–07–2018	Intility Arena	325	6–1
2019	Toppserien	25–08–2019	Grefsen kunstgress	312	1–2	18–05–2019	Intility Arena	1,258	0–1
2020	Toppserien	07–11–2020	Kringsjå kunstgress	145	3–2	26–08–2020	Intility Arena	200	2–0
2021	Toppserien	09–10–2021	Kringsjå kunstgress	495	0–1	29–05–2021	Intility Arena	50	4–0
2022	Toppserien	27–03–2022	Grorud matchbane	345	1–3	21–08–2022	Intility Arena	437	2–0
2023	Toppserien	03–06–2023	Ullevaal Stadion	2,514	0–2	14–05–2023	Intility Arena	917	4–0
2023	Toppserien	22–10–2023	Kringsjå kunstgress	396	0–3				
2024	Toppserien	08–06–2024	Kringsjå kunstgress	307	2–0	27–04–2024	Intility Arena	707	3–1
2024	Toppserien					12–10–2024	Intility Arena	723	3–0
2025	Toppserien	05–08–2025	Kringsjå kunstgress	315	1–1	12–04–2025	Intility Arena	744	3–2
2025	Toppserien					24–09–2025	Intility Arena	220	2–1
2026	Toppserien	31–10–2026	Kringsjå kunstgress			12–04–2026	Intility Arena		

==== Cup ====
Season	Round	Date	Venue	Attendance	Match	Score
2014	Second round	05–06–2014	Kringsjå kunstgress	N/A	Lyn – Vålerenga	1–5
2018	Third round	19–06–2018	Kringsjå kunstgress	103	Lyn – Vålerenga	2–5 (a.e.t.)
2023	Semi-final	30–09–2023	Intility Arena	685	Vålerenga – Lyn	3–2 (a.e.t.)

=== Head-to-head ===
==== Statistics ====
The head-to-head statistics shows the results of Lyn and Vålerenga, when they played against each other in the Norwegian League or Cup.

	Lyn wins	Draws	Vålerenga wins
Toppserien
At Lyn home	2	2	4
At Vålerenga home	1	0	9
Total	3	2	13
Cup
At Lyn home	0	0	2
At Vålerenga home	0	0	1
Total	0	0	3
Total
	3	1	15

==== Ranking ====
The head-to-head ranking table shows the results of Lyn and Vålerenga, when they played in the same league.

P.	2018	2019	2020	2021	2022	2023	2024	2025
1			1			1	1	
2		2			2			2
3								
4				4				
5					5			
6	6		6			6	6	
7								7
8								
9				9				
10		10						
11	11							
12								

• Total: Vålerenga 8 times higher, Lyn 0 times higher.
