= Trond Pedersen =

Norwegian footballer and coach (born 1951)

Trond Pedersen (born 10 February 1951) is a former footballer and coach from Norway. He played his entire career as a right back for Start. He played 41 games for the Norwegian national team.

== Club career ==
On club level Pedersen became league champion when Start won the 1978 Norwegian First Division and 1980 Norwegian First Division. He played 269 matches in the Norwegian top division between 1969 and 1984. This was a Norwegian record until Pedersen was surpassed by former teammate Svein Mathisen. As of March 2013, Pedersen ranks 41st in this respect.

== International career ==
Pedersen was capped 41 times for Norway, and participated in the sensational win against England in 1981.

== Coaching ==
He coached Start between 1997 and 1998. At the time, the club played in the second tier of the Norwegian football league system and finished in fourth place in the 1997 1. divisjon and fifth place in the 1998 1. divisjon with Pedersen as head coach. He has later coached Vindbjart and Donn in lower leagues.

== Honours ==
Start

- Norwegian top division: 1978, 1980
