= Rune Marthinussen =

Norwegian footballer (born 1970)

Personal information
- Date of birth: 10 February 1970 (age 56)
- Height: 1.72 m (5 ft 8 in)
- Position: Midfielder

Youth career
- Mjølner

Senior career*
Years	Team	Apps	(Gls)
–1993	Mjølner		
1994	Tromsø	10	(1)
1995–2001	Mjølner/Narvik FK		
2002	Fredrikstad		
2003–2004	Vesterålen		

Managerial career
- 2003–2004: Vesterålen (player-manager)
- 2005: Skarp
- 2006: Tromsdalen (assistant)
- 2007–2008: Tromsdalen
- * Club domestic league appearances and goals

Rune Marthinussen (born 10 February 1970) is a retired Norwegian football midfielder.

Hailing from Narvik, he spent most of his career in Mjølner, including the time Mjølner competed under the moniker Narvik FK. He played the 1994 Tippeligaen season in Tromsø IL and got 10 league games. In 2002 he helped Fredrikstad FK win promotion to the second tier, then was player-manager for two seasons in FK Vesterålen. After that he moved back to Tromsø and coached IF Skarp, then Tromsdalen UIL.
