= 1986 Norwegian Second Division =

2. divisjon
- Season: 1986
- Champions: Moss; Brann
- Promoted: Moss; Brann
- Relegated: Strømsgodset; Jerv; Bærum; Steinkjer; Grand Bodø; Mo

The 1986 2. divisjon was a Norway's second-tier football league season.

The league was contested by 24 teams, divided into two groups; A and B. The winners of group A and B were promoted to the 1987 1. divisjon. The second placed teams met the 10th position finisher in the 1. divisjon in a qualification round where the winner was promoted to 1. divisjon. The bottom three teams inn both groups were relegated to the 3. divisjon.

Moss won group A with 35 points and Brann won group B with 35 points. Both teams promoted to the 1987 1. divisjon. The second-placed teams, Drøbak/Frogn and Vidar met Tromsø in the promotion play-offs. Tromsø won the qualification and remained in the 1. divisjon.

== Tables ==
=== Group A ===
Pos	Team	Pld	W	D	L	GF	GA	GD	Pts	Promotion, qualification or relegation
1	Moss (C, P)	22	15	5	2	56	22	+34	35	Promotion to First Division
2	Drøbak/Frogn	22	14	2	6	52	31	+21	30	Qualification for the promotion play-offs
3	Eik	22	13	4	5	43	22	+21	30	
4	Fredrikstad	22	9	8	5	40	28	+12	26	
5	Faaberg	22	7	10	5	35	35	0	24	
6	Skeid	22	8	6	8	35	32	+3	22	
7	Sogndal	22	7	6	9	28	39	−11	20	
8	Raufoss	22	6	6	10	21	39	−18	18	
9	Ørn	22	6	5	11	27	40	−13	17	
10	Strømsgodset (R)	22	6	4	12	23	38	−15	16	Relegation to Third Division
11	Jerv (R)	22	4	5	13	24	40	−16	13	Relegation to Third Division
12	Bærum (R)	22	2	9	11	15	33	−18	13	Relegation to Third Division

Source: rsssf.no
Rules for classification: 1) points; 2) goal difference; 3) number of goals scored.
(C) Champions; (P) Promoted; (R) Relegated

=== Group B ===
Pos	Team	Pld	W	D	L	GF	GA	GD	Pts	Promotion, qualification or relegation
1	Brann (C, P)	22	15	5	2	46	13	+33	35	Promotion to First Division
2	Vidar	22	13	4	5	47	29	+18	30	Qualification for the promotion play-offs
3	Aalesund	22	10	6	6	43	25	+18	26	
4	Mjølner	22	11	3	8	34	32	+2	25	
5	Namsos	22	10	4	8	26	26	0	24	
6	Djerv 1919	22	9	4	9	31	27	+4	22	
7	Vard	22	7	6	9	29	31	−2	20	
8	Hødd	22	8	4	10	25	30	−5	20	
9	Sunndal	22	7	5	10	31	37	−6	19	
10	Steinkjer (R)	22	5	8	9	25	43	−18	18	Relegation to Third Division
11	Grand Bodø (R)	22	5	5	12	22	40	−18	15	Relegation to Third Division
12	Mo (R)	22	2	6	14	22	48	−26	10	Relegation to Third Division

Source: rsssf.no
Rules for classification: 1) points; 2) goal difference; 3) number of goals scored.
(C) Champions; (P) Promoted; (R) Relegated

== Promotion play-offs ==
=== Results ===
- Drøbak/Frogn – Vidar 1–2
- Tromsø – Drøbak/Frogn 2–0
- Vidar – Tromsø 0–1

Tromsø won the qualification round and remained in the 1. divisjon.

=== Play-off table ===
Pos	Team	Pld	W	D	L	GF	GA	GD	Pts	Promotion or relegation
1	Tromsø (O)	2	2	0	0	3	0	+3	4	Remained in the First Division
2	Vidar	2	1	0	1	2	2	0	2	Remained in the Second Division
3	Drøbak/Frogn	2	0	0	2	1	4	−3	0	Remained in the Second Division

Source: rsssf.no
Rules for classification: 1) points; 2) goal difference; 3) number of goals scored.
(O) Play-off winners
