= 1977 Norwegian Second Division =

2. divisjon
- Season: 1977
- Champions: Skeid (Group A); Lyn (Group B); Mo (Group C)
- Promoted: Skeid (Group A); Lyn (Group B); Steinkjer (Group B)
- Relegated: Ørn (Group A); Larvik Turn (Group A); Sarpsborg FK (Group B); Grue (Group B); Stein (Group C); Norild (Group C)

The 1977 2. divisjon was a Norway's second-tier football league season.

The league was contested by 30 teams, divided into a total of three groups; A and B (non-Northern Norwegian teams) and Group C, a district group which contained teams from Northern Norway. The winners of group A and B were promoted to the 1978 1. divisjon. The second placed teams in group A and B met the winner of group C in a qualification round where the winner was promoted to 1. divisjon. The bottom two teams inn all groups were relegated to the 3. divisjon.

Skeid won group A with 25 points. Lyn won group B with 25 points. Both teams promoted to the 1978 1. divisjon. Mo won group C and qualified for and the promotion play-offs but was not promoted.

== Tables ==
=== Group A ===
Pos	Team	Pld	W	D	L	GF	GA	GD	Pts	Promotion, qualification or relegation
1	Skeid (C, P)	18	12	1	5	33	16	+17	25	Promotion to First Division
2	Odd	18	9	6	3	27	20	+7	24	Qualification for the promotion play-offs
3	Sogndal	18	9	4	5	29	20	+9	22	
4	Strømsgodset	18	6	7	5	33	28	+5	19	
5	Frigg	18	7	4	7	22	16	+6	18	
6	Vard	18	8	1	9	25	28	−3	17	
7	Os	18	5	6	7	27	31	−4	16	
8	Fram Larvik	18	7	2	9	21	25	−4	16	
9	Ørn (R)	18	4	4	10	21	35	−14	12	Relegation to Third Division
10	Larvik Turn (R)	18	5	1	12	14	33	−19	11	Relegation to Third Division

Source: rsssf.no
Rules for classification: 1) points; 2) goal difference; 3) number of goals scored.
(C) Champions; (P) Promoted; (R) Relegated

=== Group B ===
Pos	Team	Pld	W	D	L	GF	GA	GD	Pts	Promotion, qualification or relegation
1	Lyn (C, P)	18	12	1	5	38	14	+24	25	Promotion to First Division
2	Steinkjer (O, P)	18	10	4	4	40	26	+14	24	Qualification for the promotion play-offs
3	Fredrikstad	18	10	4	4	35	23	+12	24	
4	Kongsvinger	18	7	5	6	21	22	−1	19	
5	Raufoss	18	6	5	7	25	26	−1	17	
6	Hødd	18	6	5	7	23	24	−1	17	
7	Nessegutten	18	7	2	9	27	28	−1	16	
8	Strindheim	18	3	9	6	20	22	−2	15	
9	Sarpsborg FK (R)	18	3	6	9	19	33	−14	12	Relegation to Third Division
10	Grue (R)	18	3	5	10	17	47	−30	11	Relegation to Third Division

Source: rsssf.no
Rules for classification: 1) points; 2) goal difference; 3) number of goals scored.
(C) Champions; (O) Play-off winners; (P) Promoted; (R) Relegated

=== Group C ===
Pos	Team	Pld	W	D	L	GF	GA	GD	Pts	Qualification or relegation
1	Mo	18	11	4	3	44	16	+28	26	Qualification for the promotion play-offs
2	Harstad	18	10	4	4	35	18	+17	24	
3	Grand Bodø	18	8	6	4	39	19	+20	22	
4	Lyngen	18	8	5	5	20	19	+1	21	
5	Stålkameratene	18	7	6	5	20	19	+1	20	
6	Mosjøen	18	5	9	4	17	23	−6	19	
7	Alta	18	8	2	8	23	18	+5	18	
8	Mjølner	18	5	6	7	26	32	−6	16	
9	Stein (R)	18	2	3	13	19	37	−18	7	Relegation to Third Division
10	Norild (R)	18	2	3	13	13	55	−42	7	Relegation to Third Division

Source: rsssf.no
Rules for classification: 1) points; 2) goal difference; 3) number of goals scored.
(R) Relegated

== Promotion play-offs ==
=== Results ===
- Mo – Odd 0–0
- Steinkjer – Mo 0–0
- Odd – Steinkjer 1–5

=== Play-off table ===
Pos	Team	Pld	W	D	L	GF	GA	GD	Pts	Promotion
1	Steinkjer (O, P)	2	1	1	0	5	1	+4	3	Promotion to First Division
2	Mo	2	0	2	0	0	0	0	2	
3	Odd	2	0	1	1	1	5	−4	1	

Source: rsssf.no
Rules for classification: 1) points; 2) goal difference; 3) number of goals scored.
(O) Play-off winners; (P) Promoted
