= Stein Gran =

Norwegian footballer (born 1958)

Personal information
- Date of birth: 20 October 1958 (age 68)
- Place of birth: Oslo, Norway
- Position: Midfielder

Senior career*
Years	Team	Apps	(Gls)
- Vålerengen

International career
1979–1984	Norway	5	(0)
- * Club domestic league appearances and goals

Stein Gran (born 20 October 1958) is a Norwegian football player. He was born in Oslo. He played for the club Vålerengen, and also for the Norwegian national team. He competed at the 1984 Summer Olympics in Los Angeles.
