= 1978 Norwegian Second Division =

2. divisjon
- Season: 1978
- Champions: Mjøndalen (Group A); Rosenborg (Group B); Tromsø (Group C)
- Promoted: Mjøndalen (Group A); Rosenborg (Group B); HamKam (Group B)
- Relegated: Strømsgodset (Group A); Strømmen (Group B); Kongsvinger (Group B); Harstad (Group C); Stålkameratene (Group C); Grand Bodø (Group C); Alta (Group C); Mosjøen (Group C); Lyngen (Group C); Brønnøysund (Group C)

The 1978 2. divisjon was a Norwegian second-tier football league season.

The league was contested by 30 teams, divided into a total of three groups; A and B (non-Northern Norwegian teams) and Group C, a district group which contained teams from Northern Norway. The winners of group A and B were promoted to the 1979 1. divisjon. The second placed teams in group A and B met the winner of group C in a qualification round where the winner was promoted to 1. divisjon. The bottom team in group A and B and the seven lowest ranked teams in group C were relegated to the 3. divisjon. The second last teams in group A and B met in a two-legged qualification round to avoid relegation.

Mjøndalen won group A with 29 points. Rosenborg won group B with 27 points. Both teams promoted to the 1979 1. divisjon. Tromsø won group C and qualified for and the promotion play-offs but was not promoted.

== Tables ==
=== Group A ===
Pos	Team	Pld	W	D	L	GF	GA	GD	Pts	Promotion, qualification or relegation
1	Mjøndalen (C, P)	18	13	3	2	42	14	+28	29	Promotion to First Division
2	Fredrikstad	18	12	2	4	47	24	+23	26	Qualification for the promotion play-offs
3	Vard	18	10	5	3	29	14	+15	25	
4	Odd	18	9	3	6	30	19	+11	21	
5	Sogndal	18	8	0	10	33	31	+2	16	
6	Vigør	18	5	5	8	18	26	−8	15	
7	Vigrestad	18	4	5	9	19	37	−18	13	
8	Fram Larvik	18	4	4	10	24	32	−8	12	
9	Os (O)	18	4	4	10	28	55	−27	12	Qualification for the relegation play-offs
10	Strømsgodset (R)	18	3	5	10	19	37	−18	11	Relegation to Third Division

Source: rsssf.no
Rules for classification: 1) points; 2) goal difference; 3) number of goals scored.
(C) Champions; (O) Play-off winners; (P) Promoted; (R) Relegated

=== Group B ===
Pos	Team	Pld	W	D	L	GF	GA	GD	Pts	Promotion, qualification or relegation
1	Rosenborg (C, P)	18	11	5	2	42	15	+27	27	Promotion to First Division
2	HamKam (O, P)	18	11	1	6	26	22	+4	23	Qualification for the promotion play-offs
3	Frigg	18	9	3	6	34	19	+15	21	
4	Nessegutten	18	6	6	6	23	19	+4	18	
5	Raufoss	18	6	5	7	26	24	+2	17	
6	Strindheim	18	5	7	6	15	24	−9	17	
7	Stjørdals-Blink	18	5	7	6	18	30	−12	17	
8	Hødd	18	5	5	8	22	33	−11	15	
9	Strømmen (R)	18	4	6	8	14	23	−9	14	Qualification for the relegation play-offs
10	Kongsvinger (R)	18	4	3	11	16	27	−11	11	Relegation to Third Division

Source: rsssf.no
Rules for classification: 1) points; 2) goal difference; 3) number of goals scored.
(C) Champions; (O) Play-off winners; (P) Promoted; (R) Relegated

=== Group C ===
Pos	Team	Pld	W	D	L	GF	GA	GD	Pts	Qualification or relegation
1	Tromsø	18	12	3	3	43	15	+28	27	Qualification for the promotion play-offs
2	Mjølner	18	11	5	2	34	18	+16	27	
3	Mo	18	11	4	3	40	19	+21	26	
4	Harstad (R)	18	8	6	4	36	21	+15	22	Relegation to Third Division
5	Stålkameratene (R)	18	7	4	7	24	23	+1	18	Relegation to Third Division
6	Grand Bodø (R)	18	4	7	7	22	23	−1	15	Relegation to Third Division
7	Alta (R)	18	5	4	9	19	27	−8	14	Relegation to Third Division
8	Mosjøen (R)	18	6	2	10	25	38	−13	14	Relegation to Third Division
9	Lyngen (R)	18	4	1	13	17	35	−18	9	Relegation to Third Division
10	Brønnøysund (R)	18	3	2	13	22	63	−41	8	Relegation to Third Division

Source: rsssf.no
Rules for classification: 1) points; 2) goal difference; 3) number of goals scored.
(R) Relegated

== Play-offs ==
=== Promotion play-offs ===
==== Results ====
- Tromsø – HamKam 0–3
- Fredrikstad – Tromsø 1–0
- HamKam – Fredrikstad 1–1

==== Play-off table ====
Pos	Team	Pld	W	D	L	GF	GA	GD	Pts	Promotion
1	HamKam (O, P)	2	1	1	0	4	1	+3	3	Promotion to First Division
2	Fredrikstad	2	1	1	0	2	1	+1	3	
3	Tromsø	2	0	0	2	0	4	−4	0	

Source: rsssf.no
Rules for classification: 1) points; 2) goal difference; 3) number of goals scored.
(O) Play-off winners; (P) Promoted

=== Relegation play-offs ===
==== Results ====
- Os – Strømmen 2–1
- Strømmen – Os 0–1

Os won 3–1 on aggregate. Strømmen was relegated to 3. divisjon.
