= 1973 Norwegian Second Division =

2. divisjon
- Season: 1973
- Champions: Sarpsborg FK (Group A); Molde (Group B); Mjølner (District IX–X); Kirkenes (District XI)
- Promoted: Sarpsborg FK (Group A); Vålerengen (Group A); Molde (Group B)
- Relegated: Stabæk (Group A); Sandefjord BK (Group A); Skarbøvik (Group B); Sogndal (Group B)

The 1973 2. divisjon was a Norwegian second-tier football league season.

The league was contested by 36 teams, divided into a total of four groups; A and B (non-Northern Norwegian teams) and two district groups which contained teams from Northern Norway: district IX–X and district XI. The winners of group A and B were promoted to the 1974 1. divisjon, while the winners of the district groups qualified for the Northern Norwegian final. The second placed teams in group A and B met the winner of the district IX–X in a qualification round where the winner was promoted to 1. divisjon. The winner of district XI was not eligible for promotion. The bottom two teams inn all groups were relegated to the 3. divisjon.

== Overview ==
=== Summary ===
Sarpsborg FK won group A. Molde won group B with two matches to spare. Both teams promoted to the 1974 1. divisjon. Vålerengen won the qualification play-offs and was also promoted.

== Tables ==
=== Group A ===
Pos	Team	Pld	W	D	L	GF	GA	GD	Pts	Promotion, qualification or relegation
1	Sarpsborg FK (C, P)	18	13	3	2	44	21	+23	29	Promotion to First Division
2	Vålerengen (O, P)	18	11	3	4	38	20	+18	25	Qualification for the promotion play-offs
3	Odd	18	9	3	6	27	21	+6	21	
4	Eidsvold Turn	18	10	0	8	38	27	+11	20	
5	Moss	18	7	5	6	23	19	+4	19	
6	Østsiden	18	8	2	8	18	26	−8	18	
7	Larvik Turn	18	5	7	6	20	20	0	17	
8	Pors	18	5	5	8	28	35	−7	15	
9	Stabæk (R)	18	3	3	12	16	36	−20	9	Relegation to Third Division
10	Sandefjord BK (R)	18	3	1	14	18	45	−27	7	Relegation to Third Division

Source: rsssf.no
Rules for classification: 1) points; 2) goal difference; 3) number of goals scored.
(C) Champions; (O) Play-off winners; (P) Promoted; (R) Relegated

=== Group B ===
Pos	Team	Pld	W	D	L	GF	GA	GD	Pts	Promotion, qualification or relegation
1	Molde (C, P)	18	14	3	1	58	19	+39	31	Promotion to First Division
2	Bryne	18	11	3	4	24	12	+12	25	Qualification for the promotion play-offs
3	Aalesund	18	6	9	3	16	12	+4	21	
4	Vard	18	6	8	4	29	26	+3	20	
5	Clausenengen	18	6	5	7	16	21	−5	17	
6	Hødd	18	6	4	8	32	34	−2	16	
7	Florvåg	18	5	6	7	32	38	−6	16	
8	Steinkjer	18	2	9	7	12	29	−17	13	
9	Skarbøvik (R)	18	4	4	10	30	36	−6	12	Relegation to Third Division
10	Sogndal (R)	18	2	5	11	15	37	−22	9	Relegation to Third Division

Source: rsssf.no
Rules for classification: 1) points; 2) goal difference; 3) number of goals scored.
(C) Champions; (P) Promoted; (R) Relegated

=== District IX–X ===
Pos	Team	Pld	W	D	L	GF	GA	GD	Pts	Qualification or relegation
1	Mjølner (C)	14	7	4	3	28	13	+15	18	Qualification for the promotion play-offs
2	Mo	14	7	4	3	21	15	+6	18	
3	Bodø/Glimt	14	8	1	5	34	16	+18	17	
4	Grand Bodø	14	6	5	3	26	22	+4	17	
5	Harstad	14	4	6	4	21	19	+2	14	
6	Andenes	14	5	4	5	12	18	−6	14	
7	Stålkameratene (R)	14	5	2	7	13	17	−4	12	Relegation to Third Division
8	Mosjøen (R)	14	0	2	12	9	44	−35	2	Relegation to Third Division

Source: rsssf.no
Rules for classification: 1) points; 2) goal difference; 3) number of goals scored.
(C) Champions; (R) Relegated

=== District XI ===
Pos	Team	Pld	W	D	L	GF	GA	GD	Pts	Relegation
1	Kirkenes (C)	14	11	2	1	33	9	+24	24	
2	Norild	14	8	4	2	36	10	+26	20	
3	Honningsvåg	14	7	1	6	29	25	+4	15	
4	Sørild	14	5	4	5	22	22	0	14	
5	Stein	14	5	3	6	22	24	−2	13	
6	Polarstjernen	14	6	1	7	20	28	−8	13	
7	Vadsø Turn (R)	14	3	3	8	13	25	−12	9	Relegation to Third Division
8	Rafsbotn (R)	14	1	2	11	6	38	−32	4	Relegation to Third Division

Source: rsssf.no
Rules for classification: 1) points; 2) goal difference; 3) number of goals scored.
(C) Champions; (R) Relegated

== Promotion play-offs ==
=== Results ===
- Vålerengen – Mjølner 2–0
- Mjølner – Bryne 0–0
- Bryne – Vålerengen 0–1

Vålerengen won the qualification round and won promotion to the 1. divisjon.

=== Play-off table ===
Pos	Team	Pld	W	D	L	GF	GA	GD	Pts	Promotion
1	Vålerengen (O, P)	2	2	0	0	3	0	+3	4	Promotion to First Division
2	Bryne	2	0	1	1	0	1	−1	1	
3	Mjølner	2	0	1	1	0	2	−2	1	

Source: rsssf.no
Rules for classification: 1) points; 2) goal difference; 3) number of goals scored.
(O) Play-off winners; (P) Promoted

== Northern Norwegian Final ==
A Northern Norwegian Final was played between the winners of the two district groups, Mjølner and Kirkenes.

- Kirkenes – Mjølner 0–1
