= 2004 Tippeligaen =

60th season of top-tier football league in Norway

Tippeligaen
- Season: 2004
- Dates: 12 April – 30 October
- Champions: Rosenborg; 19th title
- Relegated: Stabæk; Sogndal
- Champions League: Rosenborg; Vålerenga
- UEFA Cup: Brann; Tromsø; Viking
- Matches played: 182
- Goals scored: 531 (2.92 per match)
- Top goalscorer: Frode Johnsen (19 goals)
- Biggest home win: Rosenborg 5–0 HamKam (6 June 2004)
- Biggest away win: Brann 1–5 Lillestrøm (27 June 2004)
- Highest scoring: Odd Grenland 4–4 Sogndal (20 June 2004); Odd Grenland 3–5 Bodø/Glimt (25 July 2004)
- Longest winning run: 4 games Brann; Bodø/Glimt
- Longest unbeaten run: 13 games Rosenborg
- Longest winless run: 9 games Sogndal
- Longest losing run: 5 games Sogndal
- Highest attendance: 23,591; Vålerenga 3–0 Stabæk (30 October 2004)
- Lowest attendance: 1,411; Sogndal 2–1 Molde (3 October 2004)
- Average attendance: 7,970 ▲21.0%

The 2004 Tippeligaen was the 60th completed season of top division football in Norway. The season began on 12 April 2004 and ended on 30 October 2004.

Each team played 26 games with three points given for wins and one point for a draw. Number thirteen and fourteen are relegated, number twelve has to play two qualification matches (home and away) against number three in the first division (where number one and two are directly promoted) for the last spot.

== Overview ==
=== Summary ===
Rosenborg won their thirteenth consecutive title and 19th top-flight title overall. Stabæk and Sogndal were relegated. Rosenborg, Vålerenga, Brann and Tromsø finished in the top four and qualified for the 2004–05 Royal League.

== Teams and locations ==
Locations of the teams in 2004 Tippeligaen

Note: Table lists in alphabetical order.

Team	Ap.	Location	Stadium
Bodø/Glimt	16	Bodø	Aspmyra Stadion
Brann	48	Bergen	Brann Stadion
Fredrikstad	35	Fredrikstad	Fredrikstad Stadion
HamKam	19	Hamar	Briskeby
Lillestrøm	41	Lillestrøm	Åråsen Stadion
Lyn	31	Oslo	Ullevaal Stadion
Molde	29	Molde	Molde Stadion
Odd Grenland	24	Skien	Odd Stadion
Rosenborg	41	Trondheim	Lerkendal Stadion
Sogndal	12	Sogndalsfjøra	Fosshaugane
Stabæk	10	Bærum	Nadderud Stadion
Tromsø	18	Tromsø	Alfheim Stadion
Vålerenga	44	Oslo	Ullevaal Stadion
Viking	55	Stavanger	Viking Stadion

== League table ==
Pos	Team	Pld	W	D	L	GF	GA	GD	Pts	Qualification or relegation
1	Rosenborg (C)	26	14	6	6	52	34	+18	48	Qualification for the Champions League third qualifying round
2	Vålerenga	26	13	9	4	40	22	+18	48	Qualification for the Champions League second qualifying round
3	Brann	26	12	4	10	46	40	+6	40	Qualification for the UEFA Cup second qualifying round (Note: Brann qualified for the UEFA Cup second qualifying round as Norwegian Cup winners. Their spot in the UEFA Cup as third-place finishers was passed down to Tromsø, the first team in the table not already qualified for any European competition.)
4	Tromsø	26	12	4	10	38	32	+6	40	Qualification for the UEFA Cup second qualifying round
5	Ham-Kam	26	10	8	8	34	33	+1	38	
6	Lyn	26	9	10	7	30	31	−1	37	
7	Lillestrøm	26	8	11	7	45	33	+12	35	
8	Odd Grenland	26	9	8	9	47	44	+3	35	
9	Viking	26	7	12	7	31	33	−2	33	Qualification for the UEFA Cup first qualifying round (Note: Viking qualified for the UEFA Cup first qualifying round through the UEFA Fair Play ranking award.)
10	Fredrikstad	26	9	5	12	42	54	−12	32	
11	Molde	26	7	10	9	34	37	−3	31	
12	Bodø/Glimt (O)	26	7	6	13	28	41	−13	27	Qualification for the relegation play-offs
13	Stabæk (R)	26	7	6	13	25	40	−15	27	Relegation to First Division
14	Sogndal (R)	26	5	7	14	39	57	−18	22	Relegation to First Division

Source: fotball.no
Rules for classification: 1) points; 2) goal difference; 3) number of goals scored.
(C) Champions; (O) Play-off winners; (R) Relegated

== Relegation play-offs ==
- Bodø/Glimt won the play-offs against Kongsvinger 4–1 on aggregate.
6 November 2004
12:45 CET (UTC+1)

Kongsvinger	1–0	Bodø/Glimt
Birkeland 14'	Report

Gjemselund Stadion, Kongsvinger
Attendance: 3,502
Referee: Per Ivar Staberg

13 November 2004
16:30 CET (UTC+1)

Bodø/Glimt	4–0	Kongsvinger
Ludvigsen 5'; Vatshaug 18'; Olsen 59'; Berg 90'	Report

Aspmyra Stadion, Bodø
Attendance: 2,738
Referee: Brage Sandmoen

== Results ==
Home \ Away	BOD	BRA	FRE	HAM	LIL	LYN	MOL	ODD	ROS	SOG	STB	TRO	VÅL	VIK
Bodø/Glimt	—	1–1	0–3	0–2	0–4	0–0	0–0	0–2	0–1	3–1	3–1	2–1	1–2	2–2
Brann	3–1	—	4–2	2–0	1–5	5–1	3–0	1–1	3–4	2–1	1–2	1–0	1–1	1–0
Fredrikstad	1–0	3–2	—	2–1	1–4	2–4	2–1	3–0	0–2	3–3	0–2	1–0	2–2	0–0
Ham-Kam	0–2	2–1	3–2	—	1–1	1–0	5–1	2–4	2–0	3–2	0–0	1–1	0–1	1–2
Lillestrøm	0–0	2–2	2–0	0–1	—	1–1	1–1	0–4	2–2	1–0	3–0	2–2	0–1	5–1
Lyn	1–0	1–2	2–2	1–1	1–1	—	1–2	2–2	0–2	2–0	2–0	2–1	1–1	2–0
Molde	3–0	2–3	0–1	0–0	2–2	2–0	—	2–1	1–3	1–1	3–0	1–1	1–1	1–1
Odd Grenland	3–5	0–2	5–2	2–2	3–2	0–0	1–1	—	3–0	4–4	2–0	3–1	2–4	1–0
Rosenborg	3–0	1–0	3–1	5–0	4–1	4–1	0–2	2–0	—	3–1	1–2	3–0	1–4	0–0
Sogndal	1–2	3–1	2–4	1–1	0–4	1–1	2–1	4–2	3–3	—	1–2	2–1	2–1	0–2
Stabæk	2–5	2–1	1–1	1–1	1–1	0–1	1–3	0–0	1–1	3–1	—	1–2	2–0	0–1
Tromsø	2–0	0–1	3–2	0–3	1–0	0–1	2–1	2–0	4–1	3–1	2–1	—	2–0	4–0
Vålerenga	1–0	1–0	3–0	2–0	2–0	1–2	4–1	1–0	2–2	0–0	3–0	1–1	—	0–0
Viking	1–1	4–2	5–2	0–1	1–1	0–0	1–1	2–2	1–1	4–2	1–0	1–2	1–1	—

Source: NIFS (in Norwegian)
Legend: Blue = home team win; Yellow = draw; Red = away team win.

== Season statistics ==
=== Top scorers ===
Rank	Scorer	Club	Goals
1	(Norway) Frode Johnsen	Rosenborg	19
2	(Norway) Alexander Ødegaard	Sogndal	15
3	(Canada) Olivier Occéan	Odd Grenland	14
3	(Norway) Arild Sundgot	Lillestrøm	14
5	(Norway) Raymond Kvisvik	Brann	13
5	(Scotland) Robbie Winters	Brann	13
7	(Iceland) Gylfi Einarsson	Lillestrøm	12
8	(Sweden) Markus Ringberg	Fredrikstad	11
8	(Norway) Ole Martin Årst	Tromsø	11
10	(Norway) Geir Frigård	Ham-Kam	9
10	(Norway) Jan-Derek Sørensen	Lyn	9

=== Attendances ===
Pos	Team	Total	High	Low	Average	Change
1	Rosenborg	225,983	21,366	12,739	17,383	+9.8%
2	Vålerenga	187,100	23,591	7,520	14,392	+54.2%
3	Brann	178,925	17,677	9,821	13,763	+12.8%
4	Viking	161,855	15,300	10,041	12,450	+85.5%
5	Fredrikstad	113,047	10,498	6,044	8,696	n/a^{1}
6	Lillestrøm	92,486	11,887	3,797	7,114	+19.4%
7	Tromsø	73,470	9,435	3,566	5,652	+29.2%
8	HamKam	72,543	8,045	2,476	5,580	n/a^{1}
9	Molde	72,206	9,142	4,187	5,554	−6.6%
10	Odd Grenland	65,781	7,816	3,012	5,060	+3.2%
11	Bodø/Glimt	59,685	7,218	3,429	4,591	−12.7%
12	Lyn	58,825	16,014	1,612	4,525	+14.7%
13	Stabæk	55,505	5,736	3,273	4,270	−1.5%
14	Sogndal	33,148	4,413	1,411	2,550	−15.8%
	League total	1,450,559	21,366	1,411	7,970	+21.0%

Source: nifs.no
Notes:
1: Team played last season in 1. divisjon.
