= 1980 Norwegian Second Division =

2. divisjon
- Season: 1980
- Champions: HamKam; Brann
- Promoted: HamKam; Brann; Haugar
- Relegated: Frigg; Sarpsborg FK; Harstad; Strindheim; Hødd; Os

The 1980 2. divisjon was a Norwegian second-tier football league season.

The league was contested by 24 teams, divided into two groups; A and B. Both groups consisted of 12 teams. The winners of group A and B were promoted to the 1981 1. divisjon. The second placed teams in group A and B met each other in a two-legged qualification round where the winner was promoted to 1. divisjon. The bottom three teams in both groups were relegated to the 3. divisjon.

HamKam won group A with 34 points. Brann won group B with 34 points. Both teams promoted to the 1981 1. divisjon. The second-placed teams, Mjøndalen and Haugar met in the promotion play-offs. Haugar defeated Mjøndalen with 4–0 on aggregate and won promotion.

== Tables ==
=== Group A ===
Pos	Team	Pld	W	D	L	GF	GA	GD	Pts	Promotion, qualification or relegation
1	HamKam (C, P)	22	14	6	2	29	10	+19	34	Promotion to First Division
2	Mjøndalen	22	11	5	6	32	23	+9	27	Qualification for the promotion play-offs
3	Kvik Halden	22	11	4	7	27	25	+2	26	
4	Mjølner	22	8	8	6	22	22	0	24	
5	Odd	22	10	3	9	24	25	−1	23	
6	Kongsvinger	22	7	8	7	29	25	+4	22	
7	Pors	22	7	7	8	26	28	−2	21	
8	Ørn	22	5	10	7	22	22	0	20	
9	Raufoss	22	7	5	10	29	34	−5	19	
10	Frigg (R)	22	5	9	8	22	28	−6	19	Relegation to Third Division
11	Sarpsborg FK (R)	22	6	4	12	19	28	−9	16	Relegation to Third Division
12	Harstad (R)	22	3	7	12	15	26	−11	13	Relegation to Third Division

Source: rsssf.no
Rules for classification: 1) points; 2) goal difference; 3) number of goals scored.
(C) Champions; (P) Promoted; (R) Relegated

=== Group B ===
Pos	Team	Pld	W	D	L	GF	GA	GD	Pts	Promotion, qualification or relegation
1	Brann (C, P)	22	14	6	2	40	21	+19	34	Promotion to First Division
2	Haugar (O, P)	22	11	6	5	33	19	+14	28	Qualification for the promotion play-offs
3	Mo	22	9	8	5	27	18	+9	26	
4	Steinkjer	22	11	3	8	48	34	+14	25	
5	Kristiansund	22	10	5	7	39	30	+9	25	
6	Sogndal	22	11	3	8	37	30	+7	25	
7	Kopervik	22	9	5	8	35	31	+4	23	
8	Vard	22	6	9	7	27	32	−5	21	
9	Nessegutten	22	6	7	9	24	36	−12	19	
10	Strindheim (R)	22	7	3	12	28	35	−7	17	Relegation to Third Division
11	Hødd (R)	22	4	4	14	30	49	−19	12	Relegation to Third Division
12	Os (R)	22	2	5	15	17	50	−33	9	Relegation to Third Division

Source: rsssf.no
Rules for classification: 1) points; 2) goal difference; 3) number of goals scored.
(C) Champions; (O) Play-off winners; (P) Promoted; (R) Relegated

== Promotion play-offs ==
=== Results ===
- Mjøndalen – Haugar 0–1
- Haugar – Mjøndalen 3–0

Haugar won 4–0 on aggregate and was promoted to 1. divisjon.
