= 1978 Norwegian First Division =

34th season of top-tier football league in Norway

1. divisjon
- Season: 1978
- Dates: 23 April – 15 October
- Champions: Start; 1st title
- Relegated: Molde; Lyn; Steinkjer
- European Cup: Start
- Cup Winners' Cup: Lillestrøm
- UEFA Cup: Viking; Skeid
- Matches: 132
- Goals: 433 (3.28 per match)
- Top goalscorer: Tom Lund (17 goals)
- Biggest home win: Brann 9–1 Steinkjer (30 July 1978)
- Biggest away win: Lyn 0–4 Bryne (7 May 1978); Bryne 1–5 Brann (11 June 1978); Molde 0–4 Skeid (11 June 1978)
- Highest scoring: Molde 6–5 Bodø/Glimt (4 May 1978)
- Longest winning run: Brann; Skeid; Viking (4 games)
- Longest unbeaten run: Lillestrøm (18 games)
- Longest winless run: Steinkjer (15 games)
- Longest losing run: Lyn (8 games)
- Highest attendance: 23,900; Brann 0–1 Lillestrøm (8 May 1978)
- Lowest attendance: 1,890; Skeid 2–0 Steinkjer (15 October 1978)
- Average attendance: 5,533 ▼24.6%

The 1978 1. divisjon was the 34th completed season of top division football in Norway.

== Overview ==
It was performed in 12 teams, and IK Start won their first championship.

== Teams and locations ==
Note: Table lists in alphabetical order.

Team	Ap.	Location	Stadium
Bodø/Glimt	2	Bodø	Aspmyra Stadion
Brann	26	Bergen	Brann Stadion
Bryne	3	Bryne	Bryne Stadion
Lillestrøm	15	Lillestrøm	Åråsen Stadion
Lyn	21	Oslo	Ullevaal Stadion
Molde	7	Molde	Molde Stadion
Moss	5	Moss	Melløs Stadion
Skeid	29	Oslo	
Start	11	Kristiansand	Kristiansand Stadion
Steinkjer	10	Steinkjer	Guldbergaunet Stadion
Vålerengen	23	Oslo	Bislett Stadion
Viking	31	Stavanger	Stavanger Stadion

== League table ==
Pos	Team	Pld	W	D	L	GF	GA	GD	Pts	Qualification or relegation
1	Start (C)	22	13	7	2	30	13	+17	33	Qualification for the European Cup first round
2	Lillestrøm	22	11	9	2	45	22	+23	31	Qualification for the Cup Winners' Cup preliminary round
3	Viking	22	12	7	3	42	22	+20	31	Qualification for the UEFA Cup first round
4	Skeid	22	12	2	8	38	33	+5	26	Qualification for the UEFA Cup first round
5	Brann	22	11	3	8	52	42	+10	25	
6	Vålerengen	22	9	6	7	44	34	+10	24	
7	Bryne	22	7	8	7	27	30	−3	22	
8	Moss	22	8	4	10	39	38	+1	20	
9	Bodø/Glimt	22	6	6	10	37	37	0	18	
10	Molde (R)	22	5	2	15	36	58	−22	12	Relegation to Second Division
11	Lyn (R)	22	3	5	14	23	53	−30	11	Relegation to Second Division
12	Steinkjer (R)	22	1	9	12	20	51	−31	11	Relegation to Second Division

Source: NIFS
Rules for classification: 1) points; 2) goal difference; 3) number of goals scored.
(C) Champions; (R) Relegated

== Results ==
Home \ Away	B/G	BRA	BRY	LIL	LYN	MOL	MOS	SKE	IKS	STE	VIK	VÅL
Bodø/Glimt	—	8–1	1–2	1–1	2–1	3–1	2–3	4–0	1–1	1–1	0–2	0–2
Brann	3–0	—	2–1	0–1	7–0	2–1	1–0	2–1	4–2	9–1	2–2	1–2
Bryne	0–0	1–5	—	1–1	1–0	1–0	1–1	0–1	0–1	1–0	2–2	1–1
Lillestrøm	2–0	3–1	3–1	—	5–0	4–1	2–2	3–1	1–2	3–1	1–1	1–3
Lyn	0–0	3–4	0–4	0–0	—	0–2	1–2	4–1	0–2	2–2	2–3	2–2
Molde	6–5	4–1	4–2	0–3	1–3	—	3–4	0–4	0–2	2–4	0–2	2–3
Moss	3–4	1–3	1–1	0–0	2–3	2–4	—	1–2	0–2	7–0	3–0	1–0
Skeid	2–1	2–0	2–2	1–3	5–1	3–2	1–2	—	0–1	2–0	0–0	3–2
Start	1–0	0–0	0–0	3–3	1–0	3–1	2–0	0–1	—	1–1	1–1	2–0
Steinkjer	0–1	1–1	1–2	0–2	0–0	2–2	1–2	2–3	0–0	—	1–1	1–1
Viking	2–0	4–0	2–0	2–2	3–1	5–0	2–0	0–1	0–2	3–1	—	2–1
Vålerengen	3–3	4–3	2–3	1–1	4–0	0–0	3–2	3–2	0–1	5–0	2–3	—

Source: nifs.no (in Norwegian)
Legend: Blue = home team win; Yellow = draw; Red = away team win.

== Season statistics ==
=== Top scorer ===
- (Norway) Tom Lund, Lillestrøm – 17 goals

=== Attendances ===
Pos	Team	Total	High	Low	Average	Change
1	Brann	125,180	23,900	5,590	11,380	−23.9%
2	Viking	88,171	14,325	4,185	8,016	−0.6%
3	Vålerengen	80,781	11,600	2,533	7,344	−25.3%
4	Start	72,516	9,559	4,473	6,592	−7.6%
5	Lillestrøm	71,836	12,343	3,403	6,531	−22.5%
6	Bodø/Glimt	59,807	9,126	2,990	5,437	−29.1%
7	Moss	53,260	6,933	2,743	4,842	−16.0%
8	Bryne	46,270	6,933	2,743	4,206	−33.1%
9	Steinkjer	38,250	6,500	800	3,477	n/a^{2}
10	Skeid	36,684	6,774	645	3,335	n/a^{2}
11	Molde	30,628	5,742	1,183	2,784	−49.5%
12	Lyn	27,036	6,389	823	2,458	n/a^{2}
	League total	730,419	23,900	645	5,533	−24.6%

Source: nifs.no
Notes:
2: Team played last season in 2. divisjon.
