= 1975 Norwegian Second Division =

2. divisjon
- Season: 1975
- Champions: Bryne (Group A); HamKam (Group B); BodøGlimt (District IX–X); Norild (District XI)
- Promoted: Bryne (Group A); Vard (Group A); HamKam (Group B)
- Relegated: Sunndal (Group A); Florvåg (Group A); Østsiden (Group B); Lisleby (Group B)
- Cup Winners' Cup: Bodø/Glimt

The 1975 2. divisjon was a Norway's second-tier football league season.

The league was contested by 36 teams, divided into a total of four groups; A and B (non-Northern Norwegian teams) and two district groups which contained teams from Northern Norway: district IX–X and district XI. The winners of group A and B were promoted to the 1976 1. divisjon, while the winners of the district groups qualified for the Northern Norwegian final. The second placed teams in group A and B met the winner of the district IX–X in a qualification round where the winner was promoted to 1. divisjon. The winner of district XI was not eligible for promotion. The bottom two teams inn group A and B were relegated to the 3. divisjon. Due to restructuring of the second tier, three teams in district IX–X and 6 teams in district XI were relegated to the 1976 3. divisjon.

Bryne won group A with 32 points. HamKam won group B with 25 points. Both teams promoted to the 1976 1. divisjon. Vard finished second in group A won the qualification play-offs and was also promoted.

== Tables ==
=== Group A ===
Pos	Team	Pld	W	D	L	GF	GA	GD	Pts	Promotion, qualification or relegation
1	Bryne (C, P)	18	15	2	1	41	10	+31	32	Promotion to First Division
2	Vard (O, P)	18	14	1	3	40	15	+25	29	Qualification for the promotion play-offs
3	Lyn	18	11	3	4	38	16	+22	25	
4	Steinkjer	18	9	4	5	34	22	+12	22	
5	Varegg	18	5	6	7	23	27	−4	16	
6	Hødd	18	5	6	7	15	25	−10	16	
7	Frigg	18	5	5	8	23	33	−10	15	
8	Aalesund	18	5	4	9	24	23	+1	14	
9	Sunndal (R)	18	1	5	12	11	36	−25	7	Relegation to Third Division
10	Florvåg (R)	18	1	2	15	12	54	−42	4	Relegation to Third Division

Source: rsssf.no
Rules for classification: 1) points; 2) goal difference; 3) number of goals scored.
(C) Champions; (O) Play-off winners; (P) Promoted; (R) Relegated

=== Group B ===
Pos	Team	Pld	W	D	L	GF	GA	GD	Pts	Promotion, qualification or relegation
1	HamKam (C, P)	18	9	7	2	31	15	+16	25	Promotion to First Division
2	Odd	18	7	7	4	30	22	+8	21	Qualification for the promotion play-offs
3	Sarpsborg FK	18	7	7	4	24	18	+6	21	
4	Larvik Turn	18	7	5	6	25	20	+5	19	
5	Raufoss	18	7	5	6	19	22	−3	19	
6	Brumunddal	18	5	8	5	18	20	−2	18	
7	Eidsvold Turn	18	6	4	8	22	32	−10	16	
8	Moss	18	6	3	9	28	27	+1	15	
9	Østsiden (R)	18	6	3	9	15	26	−11	15	Relegation to Third Division
10	Lisleby (R)	18	3	5	10	13	23	−10	11	Relegation to Third Division

Source: rsssf.no
Rules for classification: 1) points; 2) goal difference; 3) number of goals scored.
(C) Champions; (P) Promoted; (R) Relegated

=== District IX–X ===
Pos	Team	Pld	W	D	L	GF	GA	GD	Pts	Qualification or relegation
1	Bodø/Glimt (Note: Bodø/Glimt qualified for the European Cup Winners' Cup as Norwegian Cup winners.) (C)	14	14	0	0	55	12	+43	28	Qualification for the Cup Winners' Cup first round and the promotion play-offs
2	Harstad	14	6	2	6	21	16	+5	14	
3	Mo	14	5	4	5	16	19	−3	14	
4	Stålskameratene	14	3	7	4	18	19	−1	13	
5	Mjølner	14	4	5	5	15	26	−11	13	
6	Tromsø (R)	14	4	4	6	23	16	+7	12	Relegation to Third Division
7	Andenes (R)	14	3	4	7	15	23	−8	10	Relegation to Third Division
8	Narvik/Nor (R)	14	2	4	8	16	48	−32	8	Relegation to Third Division

Source: rsssf.no
Rules for classification: 1) points; 2) goal difference; 3) number of goals scored.
(C) Champions; (R) Relegated

=== District XI ===
Pos	Team	Pld	W	D	L	GF	GA	GD	Pts	Relegation
1	Norild (C)	14	9	4	1	32	10	+22	22	
2	Alta	14	9	4	1	36	15	+21	22	
3	Stein (R)	14	8	2	4	24	17	+7	18	Relegation to Third Division
4	Kirkenes (R)	14	6	4	4	28	13	+15	16	Relegation to Third Division
5	Sørild (R)	14	6	2	6	23	26	−3	14	Relegation to Third Division
6	Vardø (R)	14	4	2	8	19	37	−18	10	Relegation to Third Division
7	Honningsvåg (R)	14	2	3	9	19	29	−10	7	Relegation to Third Division
8	Hammerfest (R)	14	1	1	12	9	43	−34	3	Relegation to Third Division

Source: rsssf.no
Rules for classification: 1) points; 2) goal difference; 3) number of goals scored.
(C) Champions; (R) Relegated

== Promotion play-offs ==
=== Results ===
- Bodø/Glimt – Vard 1–2
- Vard – Odd 3–0
- Odd – Bodø/Glimt 4–3

=== Play-off table ===
Pos	Team	Pld	W	D	L	GF	GA	GD	Pts	Promotion
1	Vard (O, P)	2	2	0	0	5	1	+4	4	Promotion to First Division
2	Odd	2	1	0	1	4	6	−2	2	
3	Bodø/Glimt	2	0	0	2	4	6	−2	0	

Source: rsssf.no
Rules for classification: 1) points; 2) goal difference; 3) number of goals scored.
(O) Play-off winners; (P) Promoted

== Northern Norwegian Final ==
A Northern Norwegian Final was played between the winners of the two district groups, Bodø/Glimt and Norild.

- Norild – Bodø/Glimt 0–4
