= 1979 Norwegian Second Division =

2. divisjon
- Season: 1979
- Champions: Fredrikstad; Lyn
- Promoted: Fredrikstad; Lyn; Molde
- Relegated: Vigør; Vigrestad; Fram Larvik; Stjørdals-Blink; Tromsø; Aalesund

The 1979 2. divisjon was a Norwegian second-tier football league season.

The league was contested by 24 teams, divided into two groups; A and B. Both groups consisted of 12 teams. The winners of group A and B were promoted to the 1980 1. divisjon. The second placed teams in group A and B met each other in a two-legged qualification round where the winner was promoted to 1. divisjon. The bottom three teams in both groups were relegated to the 3. divisjon.

Fredrikstad won group A with 34 points. Lyn won group B with 38 points. Both teams promoted to the 1980 1. divisjon. The second-placed teams, Pors and Molde met in the promotion play-offs. Molde defeated Pors with 7–0 on aggregate and won promotion.

== Tables ==
=== Group A ===
Pos	Team	Pld	W	D	L	GF	GA	GD	Pts	Promotion, qualification or relegation
1	Fredrikstad (C, P)	22	14	6	2	47	28	+19	34	Promotion to First Division
2	Pors	22	13	7	2	39	24	+15	33	Qualification for the promotion play-offs
3	Sogndal	22	11	6	5	48	26	+22	28	
4	Sarpsborg FK	22	12	2	8	33	23	+10	26	
5	Haugar	22	9	7	6	35	23	+12	25	
6	Vard	22	6	11	5	25	22	+3	23	
7	Raufoss	22	7	6	9	23	28	−5	20	
8	Os	22	6	7	9	24	31	−7	19	
9	Odd	22	5	9	8	18	26	−8	19	
10	Vigør (R)	22	5	7	10	17	29	−12	17	Relegation to Third Division
11	Vigrestad (R)	22	4	3	15	21	48	−27	11	Relegation to Third Division
12	Fram Larvik (R)	22	3	3	16	12	34	−22	9	Relegation to Third Division

Source: rsssf.no
Rules for classification: 1) points; 2) goal difference; 3) number of goals scored.
(C) Champions; (P) Promoted; (R) Relegated

=== Group B ===
Pos	Team	Pld	W	D	L	GF	GA	GD	Pts	Promotion, qualification or relegation
1	Lyn (C, P)	22	17	4	1	40	11	+29	38	Promotion to First Division
2	Molde (O, P)	22	12	7	3	52	22	+30	31	Qualification for the promotion play-offs
3	Strindheim	22	10	5	7	37	31	+6	25	
4	Frigg	22	10	4	8	36	25	+11	24	
5	Hødd	22	11	2	9	35	35	0	24	
6	Steinkjer	22	7	8	7	30	33	−3	22	
7	Nessegutten	22	7	6	9	27	32	−5	20	
8	Mjølner	22	8	4	10	20	32	−12	20	
9	Mo	22	7	4	11	28	36	−8	18	
10	Stjørdals-Blink (R)	22	5	5	12	21	32	−11	15	Relegation to Third Division
11	Tromsø (R)	22	5	4	13	24	52	−28	14	Relegation to Third Division
12	Aalesund (R)	22	2	9	11	15	24	−9	13	Relegation to Third Division

Source: rsssf.no
Rules for classification: 1) points; 2) goal difference; 3) number of goals scored.
(C) Champions; (O) Play-off winners; (P) Promoted; (R) Relegated

== Promotion play-offs ==
=== Results ===
- Molde – Pors 3–0
- Pors – Molde 0–4

Molde won 7–0 on aggregate. Molde was promoted to 1. divisjon.
