= 1981 Norwegian Second Division =

2. divisjon
- Season: 1981
- Champions: Mjøndalen; Sogndal
- Promoted: Mjøndalen; Sogndal; Molde
- Relegated: Ørn; Bærum; Skeid; Tromsø; Nessegutten; Bergsøy

The 1981 1. divisjon|2. divisjon was a Norwegian second-tier football league season.

The league was contested by 24 teams, divided into two groups: A and B. Both groups consisted of 12 teams. The winners of groups A and B were promoted to the 1982 1. division. The second-placed teams in groups A and B met the 10th-best finisher in 1. divisjon in a qualification round where the winner was promoted to 1. divisjon. The bottom three teams in both groups were relegated to the 3. division.

Mjøndalen won group A with 31 points. Sogndal won Group B with 31 points. Both teams were promoted to the 1982 1. Division. The second-placed teams, Pors and Molde, met Brann in the promotion play-offs. Molde won the qualification round on goal difference and won promotion.

== Tables ==
=== Group A ===
Pos	Team	Pld	W	D	L	GF	GA	GD	Pts	Promotion, qualification or relegation
1	Mjøndalen (C, P)	22	13	5	4	42	23	+19	31	Promotion to First Division
2	Pors	22	12	6	4	51	28	+23	30	Qualification for the promotion play-offs
3	Kongsvinger	22	12	5	5	41	19	+22	29	
4	Eik	22	12	2	8	43	29	+14	26	
5	Vard	22	8	8	6	29	23	+6	24	
6	Kopervik	22	10	2	10	34	31	+3	22	
7	Odd	22	7	8	7	26	27	−1	22	
8	Kvik Halden	22	7	8	7	17	22	−5	22	
9	Raufoss	22	6	9	7	13	29	−16	21	
10	Ørn (R)	22	8	4	10	31	30	+1	20	Relegation to Third Division
11	Bærum (R)	22	3	3	16	18	54	−36	9	Relegation to Third Division
12	Skeid (R)	22	3	2	17	16	46	−30	8	Relegation to Third Division

Source: rsssf.no
Rules for classification: 1) points; 2) goal difference; 3) number of goals scored.
(C) Champions; (P) Promoted; (R) Relegated

=== Group B ===
Pos	Team	Pld	W	D	L	GF	GA	GD	Pts	Promotion, qualification or relegation
1	Sogndal (C, P)	22	12	7	3	44	14	+30	31	Promotion to First Division
2	Molde (O, P)	22	10	9	3	41	20	+21	29	Qualification for the promotion play-offs
3	Mo	22	8	11	3	33	20	+13	27	
4	Sunndal	22	6	11	5	25	26	−1	23	
5	Varegg	22	7	9	6	31	35	−4	23	
6	Mjølner	22	5	12	5	24	30	−6	22	
7	Bodø/Glimt	22	5	11	6	24	24	0	21	
8	Steinkjer	22	8	5	9	25	28	−3	21	
9	Kristiansund	22	5	10	7	27	31	−4	20	
10	Tromsø (R)	22	4	9	9	12	28	−16	17	Relegation to Third Division
11	Nessegutten (R)	22	3	10	9	25	38	−13	16	Relegation to Third Division
12	Bergsøy (R)	22	5	4	13	22	39	−17	14	Relegation to Third Division

Source: rsssf.no
Rules for classification: 1) points; 2) goal difference; 3) number of goals scored.
(C) Champions; (O) Play-off winners; (P) Promoted; (R) Relegated

== Promotion play-offs ==
=== Results ===
- Molde – Pors 3–1
- Pors – Brann 2–1
- Brann – Molde 3–2

Molde won the qualification round and was promoted to the 1. divisjon.

=== Play-off table ===
Pos	Team	Pld	W	D	L	GF	GA	GD	Pts	Promotion or relegation
1	Molde (O, P)	2	1	0	1	3	2	+1	2	Promotion to First Division
2	Brann (R)	2	1	0	1	2	2	0	2	Relegation to Second Division
3	Pors	2	1	0	1	3	4	−1	2	Remained in Second Division

Source: rsssf.no
Rules for classification: 1) points; 2) goal difference; 3) number of goals scored.
(O) Play-off winners; (P) Promoted; (R) Relegated
