= 1981 Norwegian First Division =

37th season of top-tier football league in Norway

1. divisjon
- Season: 1981
- Dates: 24 April – 18 October
- Champions: Vålerengen; 2nd title
- Relegated: Brann; Haugar; Lyn
- European Cup: Vålerengen
- Cup Winners' Cup: Lillestrøm
- UEFA Cup: Viking
- Matches: 132
- Goals: 367 (2.78 per match)
- Top goalscorer: Pål Jacobsen (16 goals)
- Biggest home win: Fredrikstad 6–0 Brann (23 August 1981)
- Biggest away win: Haugar 0–6 Fredrikstad (17 August 1981)
- Highest scoring: Viking 5–3 Start (18 October 1981)
- Longest winning run: Brann; Fredrikstad; Rosenborg; Viking; Vålerengen (3 games)
- Longest unbeaten run: Fredrikstad; Moss; Rosenborg (9 games)
- Longest winless run: Haugar (9 games)
- Longest losing run: Brann; HamKam; Lyn (6 games)
- Highest attendance: 21,377; Rosenborg 2–2 Vålerengen (29 June 1981)
- Lowest attendance: 1,085; Lyn 1–2 Bryne (27 September 1981)
- Average attendance: 5,880 ▲15.6%

The 1981 1. divisjon was the 37th completed season of top division football in Norway.

== Overview ==
22 games were played with 2 points given for wins and 1 for draws. Number eleven and twelve were relegated. The winners of the two groups of the Second Division were promoted, as well as the winner of a series of play-off matches between number ten in the 1. divisjon and the two second-placed teams in the two groups of the 2. divisjon.

Vålerengen won the championship, their second league title.

== Teams and locations ==
Note: Table lists in alphabetical order.

Team	Ap.	Location	Stadium
Brann	28	Bergen	Brann Stadion
Bryne	6	Bryne	Bryne Stadion
Fredrikstad	32	Fredrikstad	Fredrikstad Stadion
Hamarkameratene	10	Hamar	Briskeby
Haugar	1	Haugesund	Sakkestadbanen
Lillestrøm	18	Lillestrøm	Åråsen Stadion
Lyn	23	Oslo	Ullevaal Stadion
Moss	8	Moss	Melløs Stadion
Rosenborg	18	Trondheim	Lerkendal Stadion
Start	14	Kristiansand	Kristiansand Stadion
Vålerengen	26	Oslo	Bislett Stadion
Viking	34	Stavanger	Stavanger Stadion

== League table ==
Pos	Team	Pld	W	D	L	GF	GA	GD	Pts	Qualification or relegation
1	Vålerengen (C)	22	9	11	2	44	27	+17	29	Qualification for the European Cup preliminary round
2	Viking	22	11	6	5	32	30	+2	28	Qualification for the UEFA Cup first round
3	Rosenborg	22	9	8	5	35	24	+11	26	
4	Fredrikstad	22	9	7	6	45	26	+19	25	
5	Moss	22	8	8	6	27	27	0	24	
6	Hamarkameratene	22	8	6	8	25	21	+4	22	
7	Lillestrøm	22	6	10	6	26	25	+1	22	Qualification for the Cup Winners' Cup first round
8	Start	22	8	5	9	36	38	−2	21	
9	Bryne	22	6	9	7	29	34	−5	21	
10	Brann (R)	22	5	7	10	26	40	−14	17	Qualification for the relegation play-offs
11	Haugar (R)	22	2	12	8	20	38	−18	16	Relegation to Second Division
12	Lyn (R)	22	4	5	13	22	37	−15	13	Relegation to Second Division

Source: NIFS
Rules for classification: 1) points; 2) goal difference; 3) number of goals scored.
(C) Champions; (R) Relegated

== Results ==
Home \ Away	BRA	BRY	FRE	HAM	HAU	LIL	LYN	MOS	ROS	IKS	VIK	VÅL
Brann	—	2–2	1–1	2–0	6–0	3–0	1–0	0–2	0–3	2–2	1–2	0–1
Bryne	1–2	—	2–0	0–2	1–1	2–4	0–0	0–0	1–1	2–0	2–2	0–2
Fredrikstad	6–0	1–1	—	0–1	1–1	2–2	3–2	4–1	0–0	2–2	3–0	2–1
Hamarkameratene	1–1	5–2	2–1	—	1–1	2–2	2–0	0–1	3–0	0–1	0–0	1–2
Haugar	0–0	1–1	0–6	0–2	—	2–3	2–2	0–0	1–1	0–1	1–3	1–1
Lillestrøm	0–0	0–1	0–1	1–0	2–2	—	1–0	0–0	1–1	0–0	6–0	0–2
Lyn	3–2	1–2	0–5	0–0	1–0	1–2	—	5–0	1–1	2–3	2–0	2–4
Moss	3–1	0–1	2–1	2–1	1–1	2–0	2–0	—	1–1	0–1	1–1	2–2
Rosenborg	5–0	3–1	4–2	2–0	0–2	1–1	1–0	3–1	—	4–2	0–1	2–2
Start	4–0	3–4	3–1	1–1	1–2	2–0	0–0	1–3	0–1	—	4–0	0–4
Viking	2–0	2–1	0–2	2–0	2–0	0–0	3–0	2–1	2–0	5–3	—	1–1
Vålerengen	2–2	2–2	1–1	0–1	2–2	1–1	3–0	2–2	2–1	5–2	2–2	—

Source: nifs.no (in Norwegian)
Legend: Blue = home team win; Yellow = draw; Red = away team win.

== Relegation play-offs ==
The qualification play-off matches were contested between Brann (10th in the 1. divisjon), Pors (2nd in the Second Division – Group A), and Molde (2nd in the 2. divisjon – Group B). Molde won on goal difference and were promoted to the 1. divisjon.

Pos	Team	Pld	W	D	L	GF	GA	GD	Pts	Promotion or relegation
1	Molde (O, P)	2	1	0	1	3	2	+1	2	Promotion to First Division
2	Brann (R)	2	1	0	1	2	2	0	2	Relegation to Second Division
3	Pors	2	1	0	1	3	4	−1	2	Remained in Second Division

Source: rsssf.no
(O) Play-off winners; (P) Promoted; (R) Relegated

Results

- Molde 3–1 Pors
- Pors 2–1 Brann
- Brann 1–0 Molde

== Season statistics ==
=== Top scorers ===
Rank	Player	Club	Goals
1	(Norway) Pål Jacobsen	Vålerengen	16
2	(Norway) Svein Mathisen	Start	12
3	(Norway) Bernt Mæland	Bryne	9
3	(Norway) Odd Iversen	Rosenborg	9
3	(Norway) Vidar Hansen	Fredrikstad	9
3	(Norway) Per Egil Ahlsen	Fredrikstad	9
3	(Norway) Geir Henæs	Moss	9
8	(Norway) Morten Haugen	Vålerengen	7
8	(Norway) Ingvar Dalhaug	Brann	7
8	(England) Peter Osborne	Haugar	7
8	(Norway) Tor Arne Granerud	Ham-Kam	7
8	(Norway) Kjell Ødegaard	Lyn	7

=== Attendances ===
Pos	Team	Total	High	Low	Average	Change
1	Rosenborg	143,752	21,377	8,000	13,068	+36.9%
2	Vålerengen	112,739	16,589	4,958	10,249	+56.7%
3	Viking	85,013	12,855	5,482	7,728	−9.2%
4	Brann	84,528	11,734	4,990	7,684	n/a^{2}
5	Moss	55,397	8,961	3,423	5,036	−2.3%
6	Fredrikstad	52,460	7,093	3,041	4,769	−5.6%
7	Bryne	46,860	9,601	1,943	4,260	−18.1%
8	Lillestrøm	45,736	10,230	1,904	4,158	−3.4%
9	Start	45,621	7,571	1,182	4,147	−25.8%
10	HamKam	39,533	6,300	2,111	3,594	n/a^{2}
11	Haugar	33,670	5,112	1,570	3,061	n/a^{2}
12	Lyn	30,882	9,699	1,085	2,807	+62.4%
	League total	776,191	21,377	1,085	5,880	+15.6%

Source: nifs.no
Notes:
2: Team played last season in 2. divisjon.
