= 1983 Norwegian Second Division =

2. divisjon
- Season: 1983
- Champions: Fredrikstad (Group A); Molde (Group B)
- Promoted: Fredrikstad (Group A); Molde (Group B); Strindheim (Group B)
- Relegated: Vard (Group A); Djerv 1919 (Group A); Kopervik (Group A); Stjørdals-Blink (Group B); Aalesund (Group B); Bodø/Glimt (Group B)

The 1983 2. divisjon was a Norway's second-tier football league season.

The league was contested by 24 teams, divided into two groups; A and B. The winners of group A and B were promoted to the 1984 1. divisjon. The second placed teams met the 10th position finisher in the 1.divisjon in a qualification round where the winner was promoted to 1. divisjon. The bottom three teams inn both groups were relegated to the 3. divisjon.

== Tables ==
=== Group A ===
Pos	Team	Pld	W	D	L	GF	GA	GD	Pts	Promotion, qualification or relegation
1	Fredrikstad (C, P)	22	18	2	2	84	24	+60	38	Promotion to First Division
2	Pors	22	13	4	5	56	31	+25	30	Qualification for the promotion play-offs
3	Sogndal	22	13	4	5	57	34	+23	30	
4	Vidar	22	13	3	6	57	36	+21	29	
5	Haugar	22	9	6	7	34	32	+2	24	
6	Bærum	22	9	4	9	45	49	−4	22	
7	Kvik Halden	22	9	3	10	31	48	−17	21	
8	Strømmen	22	7	5	10	23	32	−9	19	
9	Jerv	22	6	6	10	27	40	−13	18	
10	Vard (R)	22	5	5	12	22	32	−10	15	Relegation to Third Division
11	Djerv 1919 (R)	22	4	3	15	26	61	−35	11	Relegation to Third Division
12	Kopervik (R)	22	2	3	17	16	59	−43	7	Relegation to Third Division

Source: rsssf.no
Rules for classification: 1) points; 2) goal difference; 3) number of goals scored.
(C) Champions; (P) Promoted; (R) Relegated

=== Group B ===
Pos	Team	Pld	W	D	L	GF	GA	GD	Pts	Promotion, qualification or relegation
1	Molde (C, P)	22	17	4	1	60	18	+42	38	Promotion to First Division
2	Strindheim (O, P)	22	13	7	2	35	21	+14	33	Qualification for the promotion play-offs
3	Steinkjer	22	11	6	5	50	24	+26	28	
4	Strømsgodset	22	9	9	4	35	23	+12	27	
5	Lyn	22	9	6	7	28	29	−1	24	
6	Tromsø	22	5	11	6	19	24	−5	21	
7	Mjølner	22	8	5	9	24	30	−6	21	
8	Hødd	22	8	2	12	32	46	−14	18	
9	Mo	22	6	5	11	22	24	−2	17	
10	Stjørdals-Blink (R)	22	6	5	11	24	39	−15	17	Relegation to Third Division
11	Aalesund (R)	22	4	3	15	23	46	−23	11	Relegation to Third Division
12	Bodø/Glimt (R)	22	2	5	15	13	41	−28	9	Relegation to Third Division

Source: rsssf.no
Rules for classification: 1) points; 2) goal difference; 3) number of goals scored.
(C) Champions; (O) Play-off winners; (P) Promoted; (R) Relegated

== Promotion play-offs ==
=== Results ===
- Strindheim – Brann 0–0
- Pors – Strindheim 1–2
- Brann – Pors 1–1

Strindheim won the qualification round and was promoted to the 1984 1. divisjon.

=== Play-off table ===
Pos	Team	Pld	W	D	L	GF	GA	GD	Pts	Promotion or relegation
1	Strindheim (O, P)	2	1	1	0	2	1	+1	3	Promotion to First Division
2	Brann (R)	2	0	2	0	1	1	0	2	Relegation to Second Division
3	Pors	2	0	1	1	2	3	−1	1	Remained in Second Division

Source: rsssf.no
Rules for classification: 1) points; 2) goal difference; 3) number of goals scored.
(O) Play-off winners; (P) Promoted; (R) Relegated
