= 1982 Norwegian Second Division =

2. divisjon
- Season: 1982
- Champions: Kongsvinger; Brann
- Promoted: Kongsvinger; Eik; Brann
- Relegated: Odd; Raufoss; Grand Bodø; Sunndal; Varegg; Kristiansund
- Cup Winners' Cup: Brann

The 1982 2. divisjon was a Norwegian second-tier football league season.

The league was contested by 24 teams, divided into two groups; A and B. Both groups consisted of 12 teams. The winners of group A and B were promoted to the 1983 1. divisjon. The second placed teams in group A and B met the 10th best finisher in 1. divisjon in a qualification round where the winner was promoted to 1. divisjon. The bottom three teams in both groups were relegated to the 3. divisjon.

Kongsvinger won group A with 32 points. Brann won group B with 32 points. Both teams promoted to the 1983 1. divisjon. The second-placed teams, Eik and Steinkjer met Fredrikstad in the promotion play-offs. Eik won the qualification round and won promotion.

== Tables ==
=== Group A ===
Pos	Team	Pld	W	D	L	GF	GA	GD	Pts	Promotion, qualification or relegation
1	Kongsvinger (C, P)	22	14	4	4	43	19	+24	32	Promotion to First Division
2	Eik (O, P)	22	12	6	4	40	21	+19	30	Qualification for the promotion play-offs
3	Pors	22	11	5	6	29	20	+9	27	
4	Lyn	22	9	7	6	25	25	0	25	
5	Strømmen	22	7	9	6	34	30	+4	23	
6	Kvik Halden	22	10	3	9	33	30	+3	23	
7	Mjølner	22	8	6	8	21	26	−5	22	
8	Bodø/Glimt	22	7	7	8	26	24	+2	21	
9	Strømsgodset	22	7	7	8	32	42	−10	21	
10	Odd (R)	22	6	7	9	25	29	−4	19	Relegation to Third Division
11	Raufoss (R)	22	2	8	12	27	41	−14	12	Relegation to Third Division
12	Grand Bodø (R)	22	1	7	14	10	38	−28	9	Relegation to Third Division

Source: rsssf.no
Rules for classification: 1) points; 2) goal difference; 3) number of goals scored.
(C) Champions; (O) Play-off winners; (P) Promoted; (R) Relegated

=== Group B ===
Pos	Team	Pld	W	D	L	GF	GA	GD	Pts	Promotion, qualification or relegation
1	Brann (Note: Brann qualified for the European Cup Winners' Cup as Norwegian Cup winners.) (C, P)	22	13	6	3	44	21	+23	32	Qualification for the Cup Winners' Cup first round and promotion to First Division
2	Steinkjer	22	14	4	4	42	20	+22	32	Qualification for the promotion play-offs
3	Haugar	22	9	7	6	41	27	+14	25	
4	Vidar	22	10	5	7	30	23	+7	25	
5	Vard	22	9	6	7	19	23	−4	24	
6	Hødd	22	7	6	9	31	31	0	20	
7	Mo	22	5	10	7	23	23	0	20	
8	Kopervik	22	7	6	9	18	27	−9	20	
9	Aalesund	22	7	5	10	28	31	−3	19	
10	Sunndal (R)	22	8	2	12	25	31	−6	18	Relegation to Third Division
11	Varegg (R)	22	6	4	12	27	53	−26	16	Relegation to Third Division
12	Kristiansund (R)	22	4	5	13	19	37	−18	13	Relegation to Third Division

Source: rsssf.no
Rules for classification: 1) points; 2) goal difference; 3) number of goals scored.
(C) Champions; (P) Promoted; (R) Relegated

== Promotion play-offs ==
=== Results ===
- Fredrikstad – Eik 2–3
- Steinkjer – Fredrikstad 1–3
- Eik – Steinkjer 2–1

Eik won the qualification round and won promotion to the 1. divisjon.

=== Play-off table ===
Pos	Team	Pld	W	D	L	GF	GA	GD	Pts	Promotion or relegation
1	Eik (O, P)	2	2	0	0	5	3	+2	4	Promotion to First Division
2	Fredrikstad (R)	2	1	0	1	5	4	+1	2	Relegation to Second Division
3	Steinkjer	2	0	0	2	2	5	−3	0	Remained in Second Division

Source: rsssf.no
Rules for classification: 1) points; 2) goal difference; 3) number of goals scored.
(O) Play-off winners; (P) Promoted; (R) Relegated
