= 1976 Norwegian Second Division =

2. divisjon
- Season: 1976
- Champions: Moss (Group A); Vålerengen (Group B); Bodø/Glimt (District IX–XI)
- Promoted: Moss (Group A); Vålerengen (Group B); Bodø/Glimt (District IX–XI)
- Relegated: Aalesund (Group A); Stavanger (Group A); Varegg (Group A); Brumunddal (Group B); Eidsvold Turn (Group B)

The 1976 2. divisjon was a Norway's second-tier football league season.

The league was contested by 28 teams, divided into a total of three groups; A and B (non-Northern Norwegian teams) and one district group which contained teams from Northern Norway: district IX–XI. The winners of group A and B were promoted to the 1977 1. divisjon. The second placed teams in group A and B met the winner of the district IX–XI in a qualification round where the winner was promoted to 1. divisjon. The bottom two teams inn group A and B were relegated to the 3. divisjon. The 8th placed teams in group A and B met each other in a qualification round to avoid relegation.

Moss won group A with 27 points. Vålerengen won group B with 32 points. Both teams promoted to the 1977 1. divisjon. Bodø/Glimt won the district IX–XI and won the qualification play-offs and was also promoted.

== Tables ==
=== Group A ===
Pos	Team	Pld	W	D	L	GF	GA	GD	Pts	Promotion, qualification or relegation
1	Moss (C, P)	18	12	3	3	43	11	+32	27	Promotion to First Division
2	Odd	18	11	1	6	32	24	+8	23	Qualification for the promotion play-offs
3	Hødd	18	8	6	4	34	23	+11	22	
4	Sarpsborg FK	18	8	3	7	27	29	−2	19	
5	Fram Larvik	18	5	8	5	23	18	+5	18	
6	Larvik Turn	18	6	3	9	21	26	−5	15	
7	Os	18	6	3	9	25	33	−8	15	
8	Aalesund (R)	18	4	7	7	19	30	−11	15	Qualification for the relegation play-offs
9	Stavanger (R)	18	4	6	8	21	30	−9	14	Relegation to Third Division
10	Varegg (R)	18	4	4	10	15	36	−21	12	Relegation to Third Division

Source: rsssf.no
Rules for classification: 1) points; 2) goal difference; 3) number of goals scored.
(C) Champions; (P) Promoted; (R) Relegated

=== Group B ===
Pos	Team	Pld	W	D	L	GF	GA	GD	Pts	Promotion, qualification or relegation
1	Vålerengen (C, P)	18	15	2	1	34	17	+17	32	Promotion to First Division
2	Lyn	18	10	5	3	34	17	+17	25	Qualification for the promotion play-offs
3	Raufoss	18	10	4	4	41	27	+14	24	
4	Skeid	18	11	2	5	28	15	+13	24	
5	Grue	18	8	3	7	29	24	+5	19	
6	Frigg	18	7	4	7	23	21	+2	18	
7	Steinkjer	18	5	3	10	24	30	−6	13	
8	Nessegutten (O)	18	4	4	10	11	24	−13	12	Qualification for the relegation play-offs
9	Brumunddal (R)	18	3	2	13	15	43	−28	8	Relegation to Third Division
10	Eidsvold Turn (R)	18	1	3	14	11	32	−21	5	Relegation to Third Division

Source: rsssf.no
Rules for classification: 1) points; 2) goal difference; 3) number of goals scored.
(C) Champions; (O) Play-off winners; (P) Promoted; (R) Relegated

=== District IX–XI ===
Pos	Team	Pld	W	D	L	GF	GA	GD	Pts	Qualification or relegation
1	Bodø/Glimt (C, O, P)	14	13	1	0	60	11	+49	27	Qualification for the promotion play-offs
2	Mjølner	14	7	3	4	30	22	+8	17	
3	Harstad	14	6	4	4	29	23	+6	16	
4	Mo	14	4	7	3	22	24	−2	15	
5	Stålkameratene	14	3	5	6	16	23	−7	11	
6	Grand Bodø	14	4	2	8	19	31	−12	10	
7	Norild	14	5	0	9	22	51	−29	10	
8	Alta	14	1	4	9	14	27	−13	6	

Source: rsssf.no
Rules for classification: 1) points; 2) goal difference; 3) number of goals scored.
(C) Champions; (O) Play-off winners; (P) Promoted

== Play-offs ==
=== Promotion play-offs ===
==== Results ====
- Odd – Lyn 2–2
- Bodø/Glimt – Odd 4–0
- Lyn – Bodø/Glimt 1–1

Bodø/Glimt won the qualification round and won promotion to the 1. divisjon.

==== Play-off table ====
Pos	Team	Pld	W	D	L	GF	GA	GD	Pts	Promotion
1	Bodø/Glimt (O, P)	2	1	1	0	5	1	+4	3	Promotion to First Division
2	Lyn	2	0	2	0	3	3	0	2	
3	Odd	2	0	1	1	2	6	−4	1	

Source: rsssf.no
Rules for classification: 1) points; 2) goal difference; 3) number of goals scored.
(O) Play-off winners; (P) Promoted

=== Relegation play-offs ===
==== Results ====
- Aalesund – Nessegutten 0–1
- Nessegutten – Aalesund 2–2

Nessegutten won 3–2 on aggregate. Aalesund was relegated to 3. divisjon.
