= 1987 Norwegian Second Division =

2. divisjon
- Season: 1987
- Champions: Sogndal; Strømmen
- Promoted: Sogndal; Djerv 1919; Strømmen
- Relegated: Raufoss; Råde; Varegg; Ørn-Horten; Skeid; Hødd

The 1987 2. divisjon was a Norwegian second-tier football league season.

The league was contested by 24 teams, divided into two groups; A and B. The winners of group A and B were promoted to the 1988 1. divisjon. The second placed teams met the 10th position finisher in the 1. divisjon in a qualification round where the winner was promoted to 1. divisjon. The bottom three teams inn both groups were relegated to the 3. divisjon.

== Overview ==
=== Summary ===
Sogndal won group A with 49 points and Strømmen won group B with 46 points. Both teams promoted to the 1988 1. divisjon. The second-placed teams, Djerv 1919 and Lyn met HamKam in the promotion play-offs. Djerv 1919 won the qualification and was promoted to the 1. divisjon.

=== New rules ===
For the first time in Norwegian football, three rather than two points were given for wins. There was also another, more controversial new rule for points: if a match was drawn, two points would be given to the winner of a penalty shootout, and one point to the loser of the shootout. This rule, suggested by Tom A. Schanke and appointed by the Norwegian Football Association in February 1987, was highly controversial and liquidated after the 1987 season.

== Tables ==
=== Group A ===
Pos	Team	Pld	W	PKW	PKL	L	GF	GA	GD	Pts	Promotion, qualification or relegation
1	Sogndal (C, P)	22	13	4	2	3	43	21	+22	49	Promotion to First Division
2	Djerv 1919 (O, P)	22	13	0	5	4	36	22	+14	44	Qualification for the promotion play-offs
3	Vidar	22	13	1	2	6	48	34	+14	43	
4	Fredrikstad	22	13	0	1	8	50	38	+12	40	
5	Drøbak/Frogn	22	8	4	3	7	33	21	+12	35	
6	Faaberg	22	8	3	5	6	26	27	−1	35	
7	Odd	22	9	1	4	8	41	31	+10	33	
8	Viking	22	7	5	1	9	31	27	+4	32	
9	Vard	22	6	5	1	10	25	32	−7	29	
10	Raufoss (R)	22	6	2	2	12	24	48	−24	24	Relegation to Third Division
11	Råde (R)	22	3	2	4	13	23	45	−22	17	Relegation to Third Division
12	Varegg (R)	22	2	4	1	15	24	58	−34	15	Relegation to Third Division

Source: rsssf.no
Rules for classification: 1) points; 2) goal difference; 3) number of goals scored.
(C) Champion; (O) Play-off winner; (P) Promoted; (R) Relegated

=== Group B ===
Pos	Team	Pld	W	PKW	PKL	L	GF	GA	GD	Pts	Promotion, qualification or relegation
1	Strømmen (C, P)	22	13	2	3	4	44	32	+12	46	Promotion to First Division
2	Lyn	22	11	2	5	4	38	29	+9	42	Qualification for the promotion play-offs
3	Aalesund	22	10	3	3	6	45	35	+10	39	
4	Mjølner	22	7	8	2	5	33	24	+9	39	
5	Namsos	22	8	5	1	8	37	36	+1	35	
6	Sunndal	21	8	2	3	8	28	33	−5	31	
7	Bodø/Glimt	22	9	0	4	9	38	33	+5	31	
8	Eik	22	7	3	4	8	31	28	+3	31	
9	Strindheim	22	6	5	2	9	25	37	−12	30	
10	Ørn-Horten (R)	22	8	2	2	10	38	36	+2	30	Relegation to Third Division
11	Skeid (R)	22	4	3	5	10	25	35	−10	23	Relegation to Third Division
12	Hødd (R)	22	4	0	4	14	23	47	−24	16	Relegation to Third Division

Source: rsssf.no
Rules for classification: 1) points; 2) goal difference; 3) number of goals scored.
(C) Champion; (P) Promoted; (R) Relegated

== Promotion play-offs ==
=== Results ===
- 12 October 1987: Lyn – Djerv 1919 0–1
- 16 October 1987: HamKam – Lyn 1–1
- 19 October 1987: Djerv 1919 – HamKam 3–0

Djerv 1919 won the qualification round and won promotion to the 1. divisjon.

=== Play-off table ===
Pos	Team	Pld	W	D	L	GF	GA	GD	Pts	Promotion or relegation
1	Djerv 1919 (O, P)	2	2	0	0	4	0	+4	4	Promotion to First Division
2	Lyn	2	0	1	1	1	2	−1	1	
3	HamKam (R)	2	0	1	1	1	4	−3	1	Relegation to Second Division

Source: rsssf.no
Rules for classification: 1) points; 2) goal difference; 3) number of goals scored.
(O) Play-off winners; (P) Promoted; (R) Relegated
