= 1980 Norwegian First Division =

36th season of top-tier football league in Norway

1. divisjon
- Season: 1980
- Dates: 27 April – 19 October
- Champions: Start; 2nd title
- Relegated: Molde; Skeid; Bodø/Glimt
- European Cup: Start
- Cup Winners' Cup: Vålerengen
- UEFA Cup: Bryne
- Matches played: 132
- Goals scored: 392 (2.97 per match)
- Top goalscorer: Arne Dokken (14 goals)
- Biggest home win: Bryne 7–0 Bodø/Glimt (5 October 1980)
- Biggest away win: Lyn 1–6 Viking (28 August 1980)
- Highest scoring: Lillestrøm 6–4 Lyn (27 April 1980)
- Longest winning run: Viking (5 games)
- Longest unbeaten run: Bryne; Viking (6 games)
- Longest winless run: Molde; Skeid (7 games)
- Longest losing run: Bodø/Glimt (5 games)
- Highest attendance: 17,400; Rosenborg 2–0 Vålerengen (15 May 1980)
- Lowest attendance: 774; Lyn 2–1 Molde (29 June 1980)
- Average attendance: 5,085 ▼18.5%

The 1980 1. divisjon was the 36th completed season of top division football in Norway.

== Overview ==
It was contested by 12 teams, and IK Start won the championship, their second title.

== Teams and locations ==
Note: Table lists in alphabetical order.

Team	Ap.	Location	Stadium
Bodø/Glimt	4	Bodø	Aspmyra Stadion
Bryne	5	Bryne	Bryne Stadion
Fredrikstad	31	Fredrikstad	Fredrikstad Stadion
Lillestrøm	17	Lillestrøm	Åråsen Stadion
Lyn	22	Oslo	Ullevaal Stadion
Molde	8	Molde	Molde Stadion
Moss	7	Moss	Melløs Stadion
Rosenborg	17	Trondheim	Lerkendal Stadion
Skeid	31	Oslo	
Start	13	Kristiansand	Kristiansand Stadion
Vålerengen	25	Oslo	Bislett Stadion
Viking	33	Stavanger	Stavanger Stadion

== League table ==
Pos	Team	Pld	W	D	L	GF	GA	GD	Pts	Qualification or relegation
1	Start (C)	22	13	3	6	52	26	+26	29	Qualification for the European Cup first round
2	Bryne	22	12	5	5	44	22	+22	29	Qualification for the UEFA Cup first round
3	Lillestrøm	22	10	7	5	36	25	+11	27	
4	Viking	22	10	5	7	34	27	+7	25	
5	Rosenborg	22	9	5	8	42	36	+6	23	
6	Moss	22	8	7	7	33	27	+6	23	
7	Fredrikstad	22	9	5	8	35	39	−4	23	
8	Vålerengen	22	6	8	8	26	26	0	20	Qualification for the Cup Winners' Cup first round
9	Lyn	22	8	3	11	26	43	−17	19	
10	Molde (R)	22	6	6	10	30	39	−9	18	Relegation to Second Division
11	Skeid (R)	22	4	8	10	21	39	−18	16	Relegation to Second Division
12	Bodø/Glimt (R)	22	5	2	15	13	43	−30	12	Relegation to Second Division

Source: NIFS
Rules for classification: 1) points; 2) goal difference; 3) number of goals scored.
(C) Champions; (R) Relegated

== Results ==
Home \ Away	B/G	BRY	FRE	LIL	LYN	MOL	MOS	ROS	SKE	IKS	VIK	VÅL
Bodø/Glimt	—	1–2	1–3	0–1	1–0	0–2	1–0	1–3	0–2	0–1	0–1	1–0
Bryne	7–0	—	1–0	3–0	3–1	2–1	4–1	3–1	1–0	2–2	1–0	0–0
Fredrikstad	1–1	0–4	—	1–0	0–2	5–2	3–3	2–3	0–2	1–3	1–0	2–2
Lillestrøm	3–0	1–0	1–2	—	6–4	1–1	1–1	1–0	2–0	4–1	4–0	1–0
Lyn	1–2	0–2	2–1	2–1	—	2–1	2–1	3–4	1–1	0–2	1–6	1–0
Molde	3–4	2–2	1–1	3–1	0–1	—	1–1	0–2	2–1	1–2	0–4	3–1
Moss	1–0	3–1	0–1	1–1	3–1	2–0	—	2–0	4–0	0–2	2–3	1–0
Rosenborg	2–0	3–3	6–2	1–1	4–0	2–5	0–2	—	4–1	0–0	0–1	2–0
Skeid	1–0	3–2	0–2	1–1	0–0	0–0	2–2	1–1	—	0–4	1–3	1–1
Start	6–0	1–1	3–4	1–2	5–0	0–1	2–1	4–3	3–1	—	6–1	3–1
Viking	3–0	1–0	0–1	1–1	0–0	4–0	1–1	1–1	2–2	1–0	—	1–2
Vålerengen	0–0	1–0	2–2	2–2	0–2	1–1	1–1	3–0	4–1	2–1	3–0	—

Source: nifs.no (in Norwegian)
Legend: Blue = home team win; Yellow = draw; Red = away team win.

== Season statistics ==
=== Top scorers ===
Rank	Player	Club	Goals
1	(Norway) Arne Dokken	Lillestrøm	14
2	(Norway) Stein Kollshaugen	Moss	13
3	(Norway) Steinar Aase	Start	11
3	(Norway) Viggo Sundmoen	Rosenborg	11
3	(Norway) Svein Mathisen	Start	11
6	(Norway) Morten Haugen	Vålerengen	9
6	(Norway) Preben Jørgensen	Start	9
6	(Norway) Steinar Bærøe Mathisen	Fredrikstad	9
6	(Norway) Gabriel Høyland	Bryne	9
6	(Norway) Reidar Lund	Fredrikstad	9

=== Attendances ===
Pos	Team	Total	High	Low	Average	Change
1	Rosenborg	105,036	17,400	5,700	9,549	+3.2%
2	Viking	93,619	16,758	6,290	8,511	−7.8%
3	Vålerengen	71,948	10,210	2,130	6,541	−11.6%
4	Start	61,502	11,288	3,228	5,591	−11.3%
5	Bryne	57,194	13,621	2,521	5,199	+12.0%
6	Moss	56,708	9,185	3,736	5,155	−11.4%
7	Fredrikstad	55,569	8,506	3,260	5,052	n/a^{2}
8	Lillestrøm	47,359	5,536	2,083	4,305	−17.8%
9	Bodø/Glimt	40,457	5,354	2,002	3,678	−26.0%
10	Molde	34,158	5,480	1,592	3,105	n/a^{2}
11	Skeid	28,619	6,596	1,187	2,602	−41.1%
12	Lyn	19,007	2,969	774	1,728	n/a^{2}
	League total	671,176	17,400	774	5,085	−18.5%

Source: nifs.no
Notes:
2: Team played last season in 2. divisjon.
