= FK Mjølner =

Norwegian association football club

- Full name: Fotballklubben Mjølner
- Founded: 2 March 1932; 94 years ago
- Stadium: Narvik Stadion; Narvik
- Capacity: 2,000
- Chairman: Børge Henriksen
- Head Coach: Rune Mentzoni Olsen
- League: 4. divisjon
- 2025: 4. Divisjon Group Hålogoland, 1st of 7
Home colours	Away colours

FK Mjølner is a Norwegian football club based in the town of Narvik in Narvik Municipality, Nordland county, Norway. It currently plays in the 4. divisjon, the fifth level of Norwegian football, after having been relegated from the 3. divisjon in 2024. The club was the first Northern Norwegian club to play at the top tier of Norwegian football, playing there in 1972 and 1989.

== History ==
Logo of Narvik FK.

Mjølner was formed in 1932 after a merger between two minor clubs Støa Mjølner and King Mjølner. In October 1997 the club merged with rival FK Narvik/Nor. The merger club took the name Narvik FK. In February 2005 Narvik FK changed its name back to FK Mjølner.

FK Mjølner was the first club from Northern Norway to play in the Norwegian top division. Before the 1972 season clubs from the north could not gain promotion to the top division. Mjølner played in the top division during the 1972 and 1989 seasons, but were relegated both times after just one season.

The club has dropped to the 4. divisjon since their last season in the top division, being relegated in 1989, 1995, 2019 and 2024. They will play their 2027 season in the Fourth Division, after failing to reach the promotion playoffs by two points.

== Domestic record ==
FK Mjølner's best run in the Norwegian Football Cup was in 1971 and 1982, reaching the quarter finals. The club has a record 13 Northern Norwegian Cup championships, 9 as Mjølner, and 4 as Narvik/Nor.

Season		Pos.	Pl.	W	D	L	GS	GA	P	Northern Norwegian Cup		Notes
1929		Table information missing								Did not qualify		
1930		Table information missing								Did not qualify		
1931		Table information missing								Did not qualify		
1932		Table information missing								First round		First appearance in the Northern Norwegian Cup.
1933		Table information missing								Final		
1934		Table information missing								Quarter finals		
1935		Table information missing								Champion		First Northern Norwegian Cup trophy.
1936		Table information missing								Quarter finals		
1937		Table information missing								First round		
1938		Table information missing								Second round		
1939		Table information missing								Quarter finals		
1940-1945	Season canceled											
1946		Table information missing								Champion		
1947		Table information missing								Champion		
1948		Table information missing								Champion		
1949		Table information missing								Quarter finals		
1951		Table information missing								Champion		
1953		Table information missing								Final		
		Pos.	Pl.	W	D	L	GS	GA	P			
1956	3. divisjon	1	10	8	0	2	25	10	16			
1957	3. divisjon	Table information missing										
1958	3. divisjon	Table information missing										
1959	3. divisjon	Table information missing										
1960	3. divisjon	Table information missing								Champion		
1961	3. divisjon	Table information missing								Champion		
1962	3. divisjon	Table information missing										
Season		Pos.	Pl.	W	D	L	GS	GA	P	Norwegian Cup	Northern Norwegian Cup	Notes
1963	3. divisjon	3	10	5	1	4	27	18	11	Did not qualify	Final	First season clubs from northern Norway could participate in the Norwegian Football Cup
1964	3. divisjon	4	10	3	4	3	26	15	10	Did not qualify	Final	
1965	3. divisjon	2	10	7	0	3	26	11	14	Second round	Champion	First appearance in the Norwegian Football Cup.
1966	3. divisjon	1	10	8	0	2	36	5	18	Did not qualify	Champion	Last Northern Norwegian Cup trophy
1967	3. divisjon	1	10	6	2	2	18	9	14	Second round		
1968	3. divisjon	3	10	4	3	3	19	10	11	Third round	Final	
1969	3. divisjon	↑1	10	7	2	1	17	4	16	First round	Final	The Northern Norwegian Cup was abolished after this season.
Season		Pos.	Pl.	W	D	L	GS	GA	P	Norwegian Cup		Notes
1970	2. divisjon	1	14	9	2	3	36	9	20	Third round		
1971	2. divisjon	↑1	14	9	3	2	35	10	21	Quarter finals		Best performance in the cup. Promoted to the 1. divisjon.
1972	1. divisjon	↓12	22	3	6	13	10	33	12	Second round		Relegated to the 2. divisjon, first season in the top division.
1973	2. divisjon	1	14	7	4	3	28	13	18	Did not qualify		Lost promotion playoffs
1974	2. divisjon	2	14	9	3	2	32	8	21	Second round		
1975	2. divisjon	5	14	4	5	5	15	26	13	First round		
1976	2. divisjon	2	14	7	3	4	30	22	17	Fourth round		
1977	2. divisjon	8	18	5	6	7	36	32	16	Third round		
1978	2. divisjon	2	18	11	5	2	34	18	27	Second round		
1979	2. divisjon	8	22	8	4	10	20	32	20	Fourth round		
1980	2. divisjon	4	22	8	8	6	22	22	24	Third round		
1981	2. divisjon	6	22	5	12	5	24	30	22	Fourth round		
1982	2. divisjon	7	22	8	6	8	21	26	22	Quarter finals		Best performance in the cup.
1983	2. divisjon	7	22	8	5	9	24	30	21	Third round		
1984	2. divisjon	3	22	10	7	5	32	23	27	Fourth round		
1985	2. divisjon	6	22	9	5	8	32	26	23	First round		
1986	2. divisjon	4	22	11	3	8	34	32	25	Third round		
1987	2. divisjon	4	22	7	10	5	33	24	39	First round		
1988	2. divisjon	↑1	22	16	5	1	49	13	53	Third round		Promoted to the 1. divisjon.
1989	1. divisjon	↓12	22	4	3	15	23	50	15	Third round		Relegated to the 2. divisjon, last season in the top division.
1990	2. divisjon	4	22	10	8	4	29	21	38	Round of 16		2. divisjon changed names to 1. divisjon after this season
1991	1. divisjon	↓10	22	6	4	12	27	47	22	Third round		Relegated to the 2. divisjon
1992	2. divisjon	↑1	22	20	0	2	76	14	60	Third round		Promoted to the 1. divisjon
1993	1. divisjon	9	22	8	5	9	35	38	29	Third round		
1994	1. divisjon	10	22	7	5	10	32	43	26	First round		
1995	1. divisjon	↓12	22	3	2	17	20	69	11	Third round		Relegated to the 2. divisjon
1996	2. divisjon	5	22	12	3	7	50	26	39	Third round		
1997	2. divisjon	6	22	11	2	9	48	52	34	First round		
1998	2. divisjon	Table information missing								Did not qualify		First season as Narvik FK
1999	2. divisjon	4	22	11	2	9	51	48	35	Third round		
2000	2. divisjon	3	22	11	4	7	50	43	37	Did not qualify		
2001	2. divisjon	↓13	26	6	6	14	45	58	24	Second round		Relegated to the 3. divisjon
2002	3. divisjon	↑1	22	22	0	0	110	12	66	Second round		Promoted to the 2. divisjon
2003	2. divisjon	9	26	9	5	12	46	51	32	Second round		
2004	2. divisjon	↓14	26	2	5	19	27	106	11	First round		Last season as Narvik FK Relegated to the 3. divisjon
2005	3. divisjon	1	22	19	2	1	102	18	59	First round		
2006	3. divisjon	↑ 1	22	21	1	0	103	17	64	Did not qualify		Promoted to the 2. divisjon
2007	2. divisjon	↓ 13	26	6	6	14	37	61	24	First round		Relegated to the 3. divisjon
2008	3. divisjon	2	18	11	5	2	71	28	38	First round		
2009	3. divisjon	2	20	18	2	0	109	11	56	Second round		
2010	3. divisjon	↑ 1	22	22	0	0	113	11	66	Did not qualify		Promoted to the 2. divisjon
2011	2. divisjon	8	26	12	4	10	39	32	40	First round		
2012	2. divisjon	↓ 12	26	7	6	13	26	41	27	Second round		Relegated to the 3. divisjon
2013	3. divisjon	2	22	17	3	2	75	25	54	First round		
2014	3. divisjon	↑ 1	22	18	3	1	76	15	57	First round		Promoted to the 2. divisjon
2015	2. divisjon	↓ 13	26	5	3	18	21	67	18	Second round		Relegated to the 3. divisjon
2016	3. divisjon	4	22	12	6	4	54	31	42	Second round		
2017	3. divisjon	↑ 1	26	20	2	4	72	31	62	First round		Promoted to the 2. divisjon
2018	2. divisjon	7	26	13	5	8	41	41	44	Third round		
2019	2. divisjon	↓ 14	26	6	5	15	30	54	23	First round		Relegated to the 3. divisjon
2020	Season cancelled											
2021	3. divisjon	7	13	5	4	4	23	16	19	First round		
2022	3. divisjon	5	26	13	3	10	59	43	42	First round		
2023	3. divisjon	8	26	11	5	10	51	49	38	Second round		
2024	3. divisjon	↓ 13	26	5	6	15	36	67	21	First round		Relegated to the 4. divisjon
2025	4. divisjon	1	12	8	2	2	47	18	26	Did not qualify		Lost promotion playoff
2026	4. divisjon	2	16	12	1	3	57	17	37	Did not qualify		
2027	4. divisjon									Did not qualify		Starts late April 2027

== Players ==
=== Mjølner Menn Senior A squad ===
As of 3 November 2026

Note: Flags indicate national team as defined under FIFA eligibility rules; some limited exceptions apply. Players may hold more than one non-FIFA nationality.

No.	Pos.	Nation	Player
4	DF	NOR	Theodor Steen-Jørgensen
5	DF	ESP	David Intskirveli
7	DF	NOR	Truls Torblå
8	DF	LAT	Nikita Kalinins
10	MF	NOR	Emil Sebastian Slåttrem-Erlid
12	GK	NOR	Nemanja Masic
16	MF	FRA	Lounes Mohamed Foudil
17	??	NOR	Hermann Olsen
20	MF	NOR	Marius Robert Antonsen Johansen
21	DF	NOR	Jonas Robert Antonsen Johansen
22	DF	NOR	Ruben Martinussen

No.	Pos.	Nation	Player
23	MF	NOR	Gabriel Mentzoni Vang
24	GK	NOR	Mikkel Nilsen-Indresand
25	FW	GHA	Ruben Tawiah
27	FW	NOR	Milian August Sivertsen Normann
28	??	NOR	Omar Mballow
29	FW	NOR	Aron Munkvold Kristiansen
30	MF	NOR	Oliver Einås-Eidum
31	DF	NOR	Anders Ivarjord Amundsen
71	MF	NOR	Matias S. Claeson
77	DF	NOR	Anatolii Zavolik

=== Mjølner 2 squad ===
As of 13 November 2026

Note: Flags indicate national team as defined under FIFA eligibility rules; some limited exceptions apply. Players may hold more than one non-FIFA nationality.

No.	Pos.	Nation	Player
1	GK	NOR	Adrian Berg-Sollund
2	DF	NOR	Marcus Falch Hope
5	DF	NOR	Teodor Fjelldalr
19	FW	NOR	Oliver Einås-Eidum
??	??	NOR	Matteo Chitussi
??	??	NOR	Jonas Moe Hafstad
??	??	NOR	Niklas Edvardsen Karlsen
??	??	NOR	Nikolai Einås-Eidum
??	??	NOR	Casper Rognmo Svendsen

No.	Pos.	Nation	Player
??	??	NOR	Simret Beyene
??	??	NOR	Jonas Robert Antonsen Johansen
??	??	NOR	Andreas Lindberg
??	??	NOR	Anatikii Zavolik
??	??	NOR	Ask Halset Nilsfors
??	??	NOR	Sivert Theodor Johnsen Aasheim
??	??	NOR	Trym Frantzen
??	??	NOR	Ibrahim Basorry Mballow
??	??	NOR	Ludvik Nikolai Mathisen
