= 1970 Norwegian Second Division =

2. divisjon
- Season: 1970
- Champions: Frigg (Group A); Lyn (Group B); Mjølner (District IX–X); Stein (District XI)
- Promoted: Frigg; Lyn
- Relegated: Bryne; Haugar; Eik; Vålerengen

The 1970 2. divisjon was a Norwegian second-tier football league season.

The league was contested by 30 teams, divided into a total of four groups; A and B (non-Northern Norwegian teams) and two district groups which contained teams from Northern Norway: district IX–X and district XI. The winners of group A and B were promoted to the 1971 1. divisjon, and the winners of the district groups qualified for the Northern Norwegian final. The winners of District IX–X and District XI were not eligible for promotion. The two bottom teams in group A and B and District IX–X and the bottom team in District XI were relegated to the 3. divisjon.

== Overview ==
=== Summary ===
Frigg won group A with 19 points. Lyn won group B with 24 points. Both teams promoted to the 1971 1. divisjon.

== Tables ==
=== Group A ===
Pos	Team	Pld	W	D	L	GF	GA	GD	Pts	Promotion, qualification or relegation
1	Frigg (C, P)	14	7	5	2	15	14	+1	19	Promotion to First Division
2	Odd	14	6	6	2	19	14	+5	18	
3	Stabæk	14	5	4	5	17	13	+4	14	
4	Mjøndalen	14	6	2	6	24	22	+2	14	
5	Ulf	14	4	6	4	21	21	0	14	
6	Start	14	4	4	6	15	16	−1	12	
7	Bryne (R)	14	3	6	5	10	13	−3	12	Relegation to Third Division
8	Haugar (R)	14	3	3	8	10	18	−8	9	Relegation to Third Division

Source: rsssf.no
Rules for classification: 1) points; 2) goal difference; 3) number of goals scored.
(C) Champions; (P) Promoted; (R) Relegated

=== Group B ===
Pos	Team	Pld	W	D	L	GF	GA	GD	Pts	Promotion, qualification or relegation
1	Lyn (C, P)	14	11	2	1	33	7	+26	24	Promotion to First Division
2	Steinkjer	14	6	4	4	27	19	+8	16	
3	Aalesund	14	5	6	3	17	11	+6	16	
4	Raufoss	14	5	4	5	25	27	−2	14	
5	Aurskog	14	5	2	7	13	29	−16	12	
6	Drafn	14	3	5	6	25	26	−1	11	
7	Eik (R)	14	2	6	6	15	27	−12	10	Relegation to Third Division
8	Vålerengen (R)	14	2	5	7	17	26	−9	9	Relegation to Third Division

Source: rsssf.no
Rules for classification: 1) points; 2) goal difference; 3) number of goals scored.
(C) Champions; (P) Promoted; (R) Relegated

=== District IX–X ===
Pos	Team	Pld	W	D	L	GF	GA	GD	Pts	Relegation
1	Mjølner (C)	14	9	2	3	36	9	+27	20	
2	Bodø/Glimt	14	7	3	4	40	14	+26	17	
3	Stålkameratene	14	7	2	5	28	27	+1	16	
4	Mo	14	6	3	5	20	19	+1	15	
5	Harstad	14	7	1	6	23	28	−5	15	
6	Svolvær	14	6	3	5	19	24	−5	15	
7	Lyngen (R)	14	3	2	9	19	37	−18	8	Relegation to Third Division
8	Narvik/Nor (R)	14	2	2	10	7	34	−27	6	Relegation to Third Division

Source: rsssf.no
Rules for classification: 1) points; 2) goal difference; 3) number of goals scored.
(C) Champions; (R) Relegated

=== District XI ===
Pos	Team	Pld	W	D	L	GF	GA	GD	Pts	Relegation
1	Stein (C)	10	7	0	3	27	9	+18	14	
2	Kirkenes	10	6	1	3	20	13	+7	13	
3	Alta	10	5	2	3	16	13	+3	12	
4	Polarstjernen	10	3	2	5	15	17	−2	8	
5	Norild	10	3	1	6	11	24	−13	7	
6	Honningsvåg (R)	10	3	0	7	12	25	−13	6	Relegation to Third Division

Source: rsssf.no
Rules for classification: 1) points; 2) goal difference; 3) number of goals scored.
(C) Champions; (R) Relegated

== Northern Norwegian Final ==
A Northern Norwegian Final was played between the winners of the two district groups, Mjølner and Stein.

- Stein – Mjølner 1–0
