= 2003 Rosenborg BK season =

Rosenborg
2003 season
- Manager: Åge Hareide (until 27 November); Ola By Rise (from 28 November)
- Stadium: Lerkendal Stadion
- Tippeligaen: 1st
- Norwegian Cup: Winners
- UEFA Champions League: Third qualifying round
- UEFA Cup: Third round

The 2003 season was Rosenborg BK's 86th season in existence and the club's 24th consecutive season in the top flight of Norwegian football. In addition to the domestic league, Rosenborg BK participated in this season's editions of the Norwegian Football Cup, UEFA Champions League and the UEFA Cup.

== First-team squad ==
Squad at end of season

Note: Flags indicate national team as defined under FIFA eligibility rules; some limited exceptions apply. Players may hold more than one non-FIFA nationality.

| No. | Pos. | Nation | Player |
|---|---|---|---|
| 1 | GK | NOR | Espen Johnsen |
| 2 | MF | NOR | Odd Inge Olsen |
| 3 | DF | NOR | Erik Hoftun |
| 4 | MF | NOR | Fredrik Winsnes |
| 5 | DF | NOR | Christer Basma |
| 6 | MF | NOR | Roar Strand |
| 7 | MF | NOR | Ørjan Berg |
| 8 | FW | NOR | Dagfinn Enerly |
| 9 | FW | NOR | Frode Johnsen |
| 10 | DF | NOR | Vidar Riseth |
| 11 | FW | NOR | Morten Knutsen |
| 12 | GK | ISL | Árni Gautur Arason |

| No. | Pos. | Nation | Player |
|---|---|---|---|
| 13 | DF | FIN | Janne Saarinen |
| 14 | DF | NOR | Lars Blixt |
| 15 | MF | NOR | Tor Erik Moen |
| 17 | FW | NOR | Øyvind Storflor |
| 18 | FW | NOR | Christer George |
| 19 | FW | NOR | Trond Fredrik Ludvigsen |
| 20 | FW | NOR | Azar Karadas |
| 21 | DF | NOR | Ståle Stensaas |
| 22 | FW | NOR | Harald Brattbakk |
| 24 | DF | NOR | Martin Høyem |
| 26 | GK | NOR | Alexander Lund Hansen |

== Competitions ==
=== Overall record ===
| Competition | First match | Last match | Starting round | Final position | Record | | | | | | | |
| Competition | First match | Last match | Starting round | Final position | Pld | W | D | L | GF | GA | GD | Win % |
|---|---|---|---|---|---|---|---|---|---|---|---|---|
| Tippeligaen | 12 April 2003 | 1 November 2003 | Matchday 1 | Winners | 26 | 19 | 4 | 3 | 68 | 28 | +40 | 73.08 |
| Norwegian Cup | 7 May 2003 | 9 November 2003 | First round | Winners | 7 | 7 | 0 | 0 | 51 | 5 | +46 | 100.00 |
| UEFA Champions League | 30 July 2003 | 26 August 2003 | Second qualifying round | Third qualifying round | 4 | 2 | 1 | 1 | 5 | 1 | +4 | 50.00 |
| UEFA Cup | 24 September 2003 | 27 November 2003 | First round | Third round | 4 | 3 | 1 | 0 | 11 | 1 | +10 | 75.00 |
| Total | | | | | 41 | 31 | 6 | 4 | 135 | 35 | +100 | 75.61 |

Source: Competitions

=== Tippeligaen ===
==== Results summary ====
| Overall | | | | | | | | Home | | | | | | Away | | | | | |
| Pld | W | D | L | GF | GA | GD | Pts | W | D | L | GF | GA | GD | W | D | L | GF | GA | GD |
|---|---|---|---|---|---|---|---|---|---|---|---|---|---|---|---|---|---|---|---|
| 26 | 19 | 4 | 3 | 68 | 28 | +40 | 61 | 9 | 2 | 2 | 32 | 18 | +14 | 10 | 2 | 1 | 36 | 10 | +26 |

==== Results by round ====
| Round | 1 | 2 | 3 | 4 | 5 | 6 | 7 | 8 | 9 | 10 | 11 | 12 | 13 | 14 | 15 | 16 | 17 | 18 | 19 | 20 | 21 | 22 | 23 | 24 | 25 | 26 |
|---|---|---|---|---|---|---|---|---|---|---|---|---|---|---|---|---|---|---|---|---|---|---|---|---|---|---|
| Ground | H | A | A | H | A | H | A | H | A | H | A | H | A | A | H | H | A | H | A | H | A | H | A | H | A | H |
| Result | W | W | W | W | W | W | W | D | W | W | D | W | L | W | D | W | W | W | D | W | W | W | W | L | W | L |
| Position | 4 | 1 | 1 | 1 | 1 | 1 | 1 | 1 | 1 | 1 | 1 | 1 | 1 | 1 | 1 | 1 | 1 | 1 | 1 | 1 | 1 | 1 | 1 | 1 | 1 | 1 |

A = Away; H = Home; W = Win; D = Draw; L = Loss

==== Matches ====
| 12 April 2003 1 | Rosenborg | 1–0 | Vålerenga | Trondheim |
| 16:00 CEST (UTC+2) | Brattbakk 18' | Report | | Stadium: Lerkendal Stadion; Attendance: 16,849; Referee: Terje Hauge |

| 22 April 2003 2 | Brann | 1–6 | Rosenborg | Bergen |
| 19:00 CEST (UTC+2) | Valencia 84' | Report | Brattbakk 18' (pen.), 29'; F. Johnsen 23'; Karadas 40', 61'; Winsnes 72' | Stadium: Brann Stadion; Attendance: 18,642; Referee: Jon E. Skjervold |

| 27 April 2003 3 | Lyn | 0–3 | Rosenborg | Oslo |
| 21:00 CEST (UTC+2) | | Report | Brattbakk 43'; George 49'; Winsnes 59' | Stadium: Ullevaal Stadion; Attendance: 3,367; Referee: Rune Pedersen |

| 12 April 2003 4 | Rosenborg | 1–0 | Aalesund | Trondheim |
| 16:00 CEST (UTC+2) | F. Johnsen 30' | Report | | Stadium: Lerkendal Stadion; Attendance: 16,004; Referee: Per Ivar Staberg |

| 10 May 2003 5 | Viking | 0–2 | Rosenborg | Stavanger |
| 16:00 CEST (UTC+2) | | Report | George 20'; Brattbakk 24' | Stadium: Viking Stadion; Attendance: 9,528; Referee: Tom Henning Øvrebø |

| 16 May 2003 6 | Rosenborg | 3–1 | Sogndal | Trondheim |
| 18:00 CEST (UTC+2) | Karadas 44'; Riseth 49'; Brattbakk 78' | Report | Ystaas 17' | Stadium: Lerkendal Stadion; Attendance: 21,316; Referee: Per Ivar Staberg |

| 25 May 2003 7 | Odd Grenland | 2–3 | Rosenborg | Skien |
| 18:00 CEST (UTC+2) | Hoff 21'; Flindt-Bjerg 24' | Report | Winsnes 44'; F. Johnsen 62'; Deila 90' (o.g.) | Stadium: Odd Stadion; Attendance: 7,424; Referee: Tom Henning Øvrebø |

| 28 May 2003 8 | Rosenborg | 1–1 | Lillestrøm | Trondheim |
| 19:00 CEST (UTC+2) | F. Johnsen 63' | Report | Kippe 45' | Stadium: Lerkendal Stadion; Attendance: 14,349; Referee: Roy Helge Olsen |

| 1 June 2003 9 | Bodø/Glimt | 0–3 | Rosenborg | Bodø |
| 18:00 CEST (UTC+2) | | Report | F. Johnsen 30'; Brattbakk > 50'; Stensaas 90' | Stadium: Aspmyra Stadion; Attendance: 7,318; Referee: Tommy Skjerven |

| 14 June 2003 10 | Rosenborg | 5–0 | Molde | Trondheim |
| 19:05 CEST (UTC+2) | Brattbakk 25', 28' (pen.); F. Johnsen 45', 57'; Storflor 79' | Report | | Stadium: Lerkendal Stadion; Attendance: 16,760; Referee: Rune Pedersen |

| 22 June 2003 11 | Stabæk | 2–2 | Rosenborg | Bærum |
| 20:15 CEST (UTC+2) | Sand 32'; Poljac 83' | Report | Berg 57'; Karadas 81' | Stadium: Nadderud Stadion; Attendance: 6,214; Referee: Espen Berntsen |

| 29 June 2003 12 | Rosenborg | 4–1 | Bryne | Trondheim |
| 18:00 CEST (UTC+2) | F. Johnsen 33', 88'; Strand 45'; George 87' | Report | Hjelmhaug 39' | Stadium: Lerkendal Stadion; Attendance: 15,118; Referee: Brage Sandmoen |

| 20 July 2003 13 | Tromsø | 2–1 | Rosenborg | Tromsø |
| 18:00 CEST (UTC+2) | Hafstad 10'; Kovács 39' | Report | George 90' | Stadium: Alfheim Stadion; Attendance: 6,072; Referee: Terje Hauge |

| 27 July 2003 14 | Vålerenga | 0–1 | Rosenborg | Oslo |
| 20:15 CEST (UTC+2) | | Report | F. Johnsen 13' | Stadium: Ullevaal Stadion; Attendance: 16,136; Referee: Espen Berntsen |

| 3 August 2003 15 | Rosenborg | 2–2 | Brann | Trondheim |
| 20:00 CEST (UTC+2) | Brattbakk 48'; F. Johnsen 52' | Report | Kvisvik 22'; Haugen 44' | Stadium: Lerkendal Stadion; Attendance: 15,586; Referee: Tom Henning Øvrebø |

| 10 August 2003 16 | Rosenborg | 2–0 | Lyn | Trondheim |
| 18:00 CEST (UTC+2) | Stensaas 82'; Brattbakk 88' | Report | | Stadium: Lerkendal Stadion; Attendance: 12.009; Referee: Øyvind Alapnes |

| 16 August 2003 17 | Aalesund | 0–2 | Rosenborg | Ålesund |
| 16:00 CEST (UTC+2) | | Report | Karadas 28'; Storflor 90' | Stadium: Kråmyra Stadion; Attendance: 8,071; Referee: Jonny Ditlefsen |

| 23 August 2003 18 | Rosenborg | 4–1 | Viking | Trondheim |
| 19:00 CEST (UTC+2) | Brattbakk 14'; Storflor 18'; Solli 47'; Riseth 87' | Report | Kopteff 56' | Stadium: Lerkendal Stadion; Attendance: 13,374; Referee: Brage Sandmoen |

| 31 August 2003 19 | Sogndal | 1–1 | Rosenborg | Sogndalsfjøra |
| 20:15 CEST (UTC+2) | Tangedal 86' | Report | Storflor 11' | Stadium: Fosshaugane; Attendance: 4,052; Referee: Jonny Ditlefsen |

| 13 September 2003 20 | Rosenborg | 3–1 | Odd Grenland | Trondheim |
| 16:00 CEST (UTC+2) | Brattbakk 27' (pen.), 67'; F. Johnsen 66' | Report | Henriksson 69' | Stadium: Lerkendal Stadion; Attendance: 14,411; Referee: Brage Sandmoen |

| 21 September 2003 21 | Lillestrøm | 0–6 | Rosenborg | Lillestrøm |
| 20:15 CEST (UTC+2) | | Report | Brattbakk 3', 14'; Berg 12'; Storflor 60'; Stensaas 75', 86' | Stadium: Åråsen Stadion; Attendance: 8,250; Referee: Roy Helge Olsen |

| 28 September 2003 22 | Rosenborg | 5–4 | Bodø/Glimt | Trondheim |
| 16:00 CEST (UTC+2) | Riseth 9'; F. Johnsen 31'; Storflor 35'; Brattbakk 48'; Strand 61' | Report | Kjølner 58'; Berg 65' (pen.); Råstad 68'; Bjørkan 88' | Stadium: Lerkendal Stadion; Attendance: 21,062; Referee: Rune Pedersen |

| 5 October 2003 23 | Molde | 0–2 | Rosenborg | Molde |
| 16:00 CEST (UTC+2) | | Report | F. Johnsen 3'; Singsaas 71' (o.g.) | Stadium: Molde Stadion; Attendance: 7,563; Referee: Espen Berntsen |

| 19 October 2003 24 | Rosenborg | 1–6 | Stabæk | Trondheim |
| 19:00 CEST (UTC+2) | Holter 80' (o.g.) | Report | Stenvoll 3', 14'; Sand 5'; Finstad 44', 70'; Holter 87' | Stadium: Lerkendal Stadion; Attendance: 13,384; Referee: Tom Henning Øvrebø |

| 26 October 2003 25 | Bryne | 2–4 | Rosenborg | Bryne |
| 13:00 CEST (UTC+2) | Pavlovic 43'; Gallo 48' (pen.) | Report | Basma 12'; F. Johnsen 20'; Storflor 25', 75' | Stadium: Bryne Stadion; Attendance: 7,563; Referee: Espen Berntsen |

| 1 November 2003 26 | Rosenborg | 0–1 | Tromsø | Trondheim |
| 13:00 CET (UTC+1) | | Report | Moen 90' | Stadium: Lerkendal Stadion; Attendance: 15,506; Referee: Tom Henning Øvrebø |

==== Table ====
| Pos | Team | Pld | W | D | L | GF | GA | GD | Pts | Qualification or relegation |
|---|---|---|---|---|---|---|---|---|---|---|
| 1 | Rosenborg (C) | 26 | 19 | 4 | 3 | 68 | 28 | +40 | 61 | Qualification for the Champions League second qualifying round |
| 2 | Bodø/Glimt | 26 | 14 | 5 | 7 | 45 | 30 | +15 | 47 | Qualification for the UEFA Cup second qualifying round |
| 3 | Stabæk | 26 | 11 | 9 | 6 | 51 | 35 | +16 | 42 | Qualification for the UEFA Cup second qualifying round |
| 4 | Odd Grenland | 26 | 11 | 5 | 10 | 46 | 43 | +3 | 38 | Qualification for the UEFA Cup second qualifying round |
| 5 | Viking | 26 | 9 | 10 | 7 | 46 | 34 | +12 | 37 | |

Source: fotball.no
Rules for classification: 1) points; 2) goal difference; 3) number of goals scored.
(C) Champions

=== Norwegian Cup ===
| 7 May 2003 First Round | Buvik | 0–17 | Rosenborg | Buvika |
| 18:00 CEST (UTC+2) | | Report | Enerly 11', 17', 19' (pen.); Brattbakk 22', 29', 34'; Winsnes 33', 90'; Basma 36'; Stensaas 44', 90'; Johnsen 47', 67'; George 52', 68'; Karadas 55'; Storflor 75' | Stadium: Da-Tel Arena; Attendance: 810; Referee: Svein Inge Wiken |

| 13 May 2003 Second Round | Rosenborg | 15–0 | Clausenengen | Trondheim |
| 18:00 CEST (UTC+2) | Strand 9', 20'; Brattbakk 10' (pen.), 35', 68', 76'; George 21', 43', 51', 90'; Johnsen 47', 61', 78'; Enerly 54'; Stensaas 67' | Report | | Stadium: SalMar Banen Kunstgress; Attendance: 645; Referee: Bjarne Hansen |

| 25 June 2003 Third Round | Lofoten | 1–6 | Rosenborg | Kabelvåg |
| 18:00 CEST (UTC+2) | Jensen 51' | Report | Karadas 48'; Johnsen 56', 76'; Berg 74'; George 86'; Rodahl 89' (o.g.) | Stadium: Kabelvåg kunstgress Attendance: 2,700; Referee: Per Ivar Staberg |

| 23 July 2003 Fourth Round | Rosenborg | 5–0 | Lyn | Trondheim |
| 19:00 CEST (UTC+2) | Johnsen 8', 62'; Strand 53'; Storflor 68'; Brattbakk 81' | Report | | Stadium: Lerkendal Stadion; Attendance: 7,500; Referee: Tommy Skjerven |

| 17 September 2003 Quarter-finals | Haugesund | 2–3 | Rosenborg | Haugesund |
| 16:30 CEST (UTC+2) | Rødahl 49'; Wiken 63' | Report | Karadas 10'; Johnsen 21'; Storflor 37' | Stadium: Haugesund Stadion; Attendance: 8,057; Referee: Brage Sandmoen |

| 2 October 2003 Semi-finals | Rosenborg | 2–1 | Skeid | Trondheim |
| 19:00 CEST (UTC+2) | Strand 32'; Brattbakk 36' | Report | Noppi 77' | Stadium: Lerkendal Stadion; Attendance: 8,372; Referee: Tommy Skjerven |

==== Final ====
| 9 November 2003 | Bodø/Glimt | 1–3 (a.e.t.) | Rosenborg | Oslo |
| 13:15 CET (UTC+1) | Johansen 28' | Report | Johnsen 35'; Solli 105', 120' | Stadium: Ullevaal Stadion; Attendance: 25,447; Referee: Terje Hauge |

=== UEFA Champions League ===
==== Second qualifying round ====
| 30 July 2003 First leg | Bohemians (Republic of Ireland) | 0–1 | (Norway) Rosenborg | Dublin, Republic of Ireland |
| 19:45 WEST (UTC+1) | | Report | Karadas 35' | Stadium: Dalymount Park; Attendance: 7,930; Referee: Bernhard Brugger (Austria) |

| 6 August 2003 Second leg | Rosenborg (Norway) | 4–0 (5–0 agg.) | (Republic of Ireland) Bohemians | Trondheim, Norway |
| 20:45 CEST (UTC+2) | Karadas 43'; Brattbakk 51'; Strand 68'; Johnsen 76' | Report | | Stadium: Lerkendal Stadion; Attendance: 15,911; Referee: Ruud Bossen (Netherlands) |

==== Third qualifying round ====
| 13 August 2003 First leg | Rosenborg (Norway) | 0–0 | (Spain) Deportivo La Coruña | Trondheim, Norway |
| 20:45 CEST (UTC+2) | | Report | | Stadium: Lerkendal Stadion; Attendance: 21,166; Referee: Graham Poll (England) |

| 26 August 2003 Second leg | Deportivo La Coruña (Spain) | 1–0 (1–0 agg.) | (Norway) Rosenborg | A Coruña, Spain |
| 21:30 CEST (UTC+2) | Luque 16' | Report | | Stadium: Estadio Riazor; Attendance: 22,153; Referee: Ľuboš Micheľ (Slovakia) |

=== UEFA Cup ===
==== First round ====
| 24 September 2003 First leg | Ventspils (Latvia) | 1–4 | (Norway) Rosenborg | Liepāja, Latvia |
| 20:00 EEST (UTC+3) | Rimkus 81' (pen.) | Report | Johnsen 23'; Stensaas 32'; Storflor 39'; Brattbakk 68' | Stadium: Daugava Stadium; Attendance: 3,000; Referee: Paul McKeon (Ireland) |

| 15 October 2003 Second leg | Rosenborg (Norway) | 6–0 (10–1 agg.) | (Latvia) Ventspils | Trondheim, Norway |
| 18:30 CEST (UTC+2) | Karadas 17'; Brattbakk 29', 90+2'; Hoftun 45'; Solli 57'; Lukaševičs 90' (o.g.) | Report | | Stadium: Lerkendal Stadion; Attendance: 17,077; Referee: Mikko Vuorela (Finland) |

==== Second round ====
| 29 October 2003 First leg | Rosenborg (Norway) | 0–0 | (Serbia and Montenegro) Red Star Belgrade | Trondheim, Norway |
| 20:00 CET (UTC+1) | | Report | | Stadium: Lerkendal Stadion; Attendance: 15,000; Referee: Steve Bennett (England) |

| 27 November 2003 Second leg | Red Star Belgrade (Serbia and Montenegro) | 0–1 (0–1 agg.) | (Norway) Rosenborg | Belgrade, Serbia and Montenegro |
| 19:00 CET (UTC+1) | | Report | Brattbakk 50' | Stadium: Red Star Stadium; Attendance: 55,000; Referee: Paulo Costa (Portugal) |

Third round took place during the 2004 season.
