= 2003 Norwegian Football Cup final =

- Event: 2003 Norwegian Football Cup
| Bodø/Glimt | Rosenborg |
| 1 | 3 |
- After extra time
- Date: 9 November 2003
- Venue: Ullevaal Stadion, Oslo
- Referee: Terje Hauge
- Attendance: 25,447

The 2003 Norwegian Football Cup final was the final match of the 2003 Norwegian Football Cup, the 98th season of the Norwegian Football Cup, the premier Norwegian football cup competition organized by the Football Association of Norway (NFF). The match was played on 9 November 2003 at the Ullevaal Stadion in Oslo, and opposed two Tippeligaen sides Bodø/Glimt and Rosenborg. Rosenborg defeated Bodø/Glimt 3–1 after extra time to claim the Norwegian Cup for a ninth time in their history.

== Route to the final ==
| Bodø/Glimt | | | Round | Rosenborg | | |
|---|---|---|---|---|---|---|
| Verdal | A | 5–3 | Round 1 | Buvik | A | 17–0 |
| Mo | H | 2–1 | Round 2 | Clausenengen | A | 15–0 |
| Tromsdalen | A | 2–1 | Round 3 | Lofoten | A | 6–1 |
| Ørn-Horten | A | 3–1 | Round 4 | Lyn | H | 5–0 |
| Aalesund | H | 3–0 | Quarterfinal | Haugesund | A | 3–2 |
| Tromsø | A | 3–0 | Semifinal | Skeid | H | 2–1 |

== Match ==
=== Details ===
9 November 2003
13:15 CET (UTC+1)

| Bodø/Glimt | 1–3 (a.e.t.) | Rosenborg |
|---|---|---|
| Johansen 28' | Report | F. Johnsen 35'; Solli 105', 120' |

Ullevaal Stadion, Oslo
Attendance: 25,447
Referee: Terje Hauge (Olsvik)

| Bodø/Glimt | Rosenborg |

Bodø/Glimt:
| GK | 1 | (Norway) Tor Egil Horn |
| DF | 24 | (Norway) Kristoffer Paulsen Vatshaug | | (substituted off) 103' |
| DF | 4 | (Norway) Cato Andrè Hansen |
| DF | 22 | (Norway) Fredrik Kjølner |
| DF | 14 | (Norway) Håvard Halvorsen |
| MF | 6 | (Norway) Runar Berg |
| MF | 8 | (Norway) Olav Råstad |
| MF | 26 | (Norway) André Hanssen | (yellow card) 36' |
| FW | 9 | (Norway) Aasmund Bjørkan | | (substituted off) 68' |
| FW | 7 | (Norway) Stig Johansen (c) | (yellow card) 11' |
| FW | 18 | (Norway) Christian Berg | | (substituted off) 90' |
Substitutions:
| GK | 12 | (Norway) Jonas Kolstad |
| DF | 3 | (Norway) Hans Jørgen Andersen |
| FW | 11 | (Finland) Ville Lehtinen |
| MF | 19 | (Norway) Jan Egil Brekke | | (substituted on) 90' |
| FW | 20 | (Norway) Trond Olsen | | (substituted on) 103' |
| MF | 21 | (Norway) Per Ivar Steinbakk |
| FW | 23 | (Norway) Trond F. Ludvigsen | | (substituted on) 68' |
Coach:
(Norway) Øystein Gåre

Rosenborg:
| GK | 1 | (Norway) Espen Johnsen |
| DF | 5 | (Norway) Christer Basma |
| DF | 10 | (Norway) Vidar Riseth |
| DF | 3 | (Norway) Erik Hoftun (c) |
| DF | 21 | (Norway) Ståle Stensaas | (yellow card) 41' |
| MF | 6 | (Norway) Roar Strand | | (substituted off) 77' |
| MF | 7 | (Norway) Ørjan Berg |
| MF | 4 | (Norway) Fredrik Winsnes |
| FW | 17 | (Norway) Øyvind Storflor | | (substituted off) 84' |
| FW | 9 | (Norway) Frode Johnsen |
| FW | 22 | (Norway) Harald Brattbakk | (yellow card) 31' |
Substitutions:
| GK | 12 | (Iceland) Árni Gautur Arason |
| MF | 2 | (Norway) Odd Inge Olsen |
| FW | 8 | (Norway) Dagfinn Enerly |
| MF | 11 | (Norway) Jan Gunnar Solli | | (substituted on) 77' |
| DF | 14 | (Norway) Lars Blixt |
| FW | 20 | (Norway) Azar Karadas | | (substituted on) 84' |
| DF | 22 | (Norway) Torjus Hansén |
Coach:
(Norway) Åge Hareide
