= History of Rosenborg BK =

Norwegian football club history

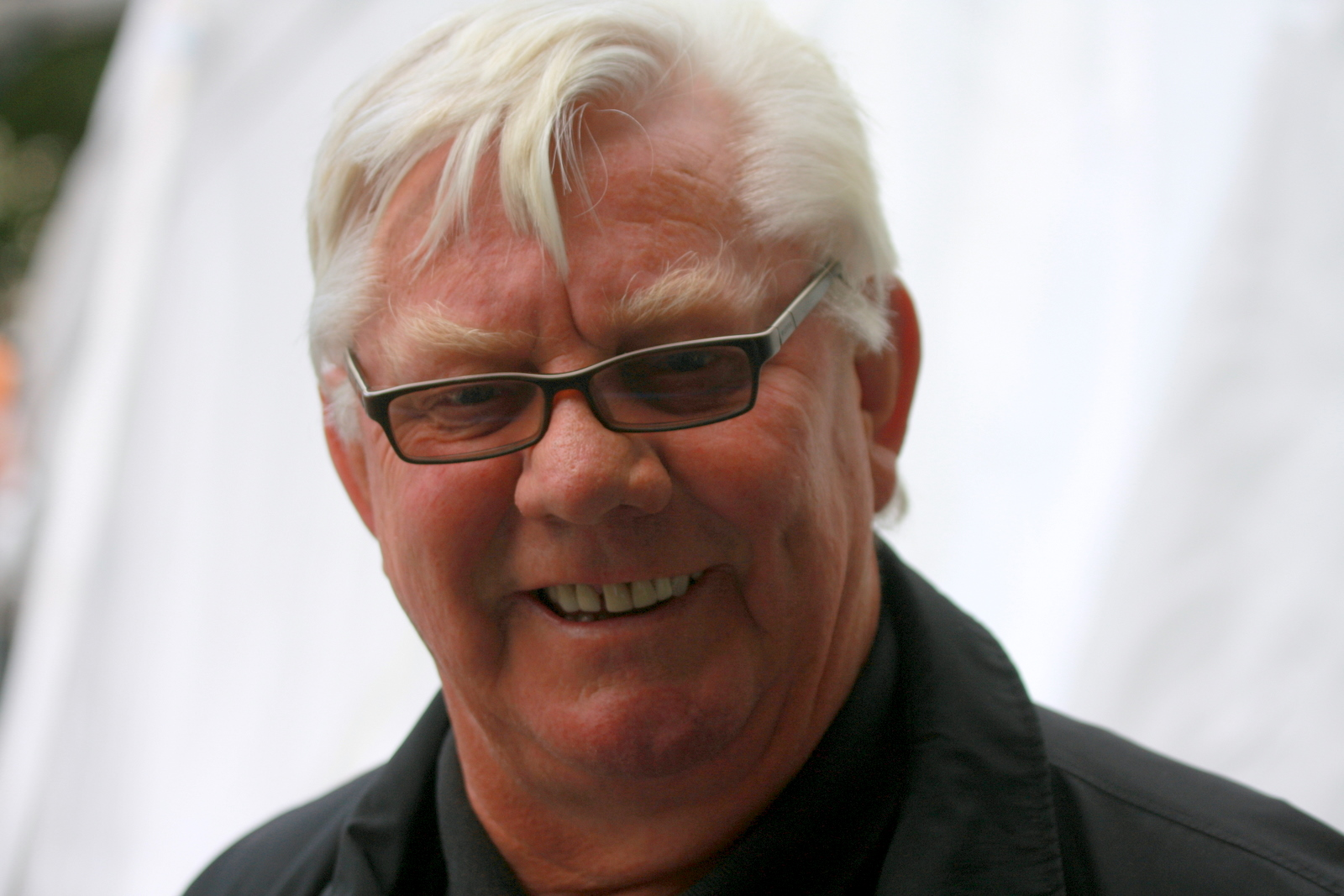
Nils Arne Eggen was manager for Rosenborg for several periods between 1971 and 2010

Rosenborg Ballklub is a football club from Trondheim, Norway. It was established in 1917 as Odd by 12 boys, and played local friendlies, became it was not permitted to join the Football Association of Norway (NFF). After permission was granted, it took the current name and joined the league system in 1928. Until 1937, Rosenborg played in the regional league, both in the A and B division, after numerous promotions and relegations. Since 1932, the team has played in the Norwegian Football Cup. It jointed the inaugural League of Norway in 1937, but the break-out of the Second World War in 1940 caused a halt to all organized sports.

In 1945, Rosenborg won the ad hoc regional league and play-offs, becoming district champions. It failed in the following season's qualification, and spent the following years up and down between the Third and Second Divisions. In 1958–59, it won the Third Division, and the following season won the Second Division, allowing Rosenborg to play in the Main League. Rosenborg took its first cup trophy in 1960, but in the important 1961–62 season failed to qualify for the new First Division the following season. The club spent four seasons in the Second Division, after which it has played at the top level except in the 1978 season. Rosenborg won the cup again in 1964, allowing it to play in the Cup Winners' Cup the following season. The league was won in 1967, 1969 and 1971—the latter also resulting in the double.

The next league trophy was won in 1985, and then in 1988 and 1990. From 1992 through 2004, Rosenborg took 13 consecutive league trophies, and has since also won three more. The club had limited success in the UEFA tournaments, never coming past the first round, until reaching the group stage of Champions League in 1995, which was subsequently reached eight consecutive times, and eleven times in total. The success during the 1990s has largely been credited to manager Nils Arne Eggen. After his 2002 retirement, the club went through eight managers, with the stable success falling.

== Odd ==
The club was founded by a group of twelve boys aged about 17 from the Rosenborg neighborhood on 19 May 1917. It was named Odd, after the club with the same name in Skien, which at the time was Norway's most successful team. The membership fee was set to 0.25 Norwegian krone (NOK) per week—the same price as a cinema ticket—which would allow them have sufficient funds to buy a kit set within a year. The team did some practices in the Solhaug area during the summer, but could not find any other teams to schedule matches against.

On 19 May 1918, treasurer Karl Skagen presented a complete kit for all twelve members. The top was blue with yellow detailing, while the shorts were white. The team's first match was held in mid-July against Falk, which Odd won 2–1. During the season, the club had problems with getting sufficient players to meet to the matches, particularly because of shift work. Until then, it was only the founders which had been members, but from 1919 new players were recruited. From that year, the club also started organizing dance parties.

Odd was like many of the other clubs in Trondheim not a member of NFF. Instead they played unofficial tournaments and matches against other private clubs in the area. During the early 1920s, the number of clubs joining NFF increased rapidly, and by 1923 Odd only played a single match during the entire season. In 1924, the annual meeting decided to start working with joining NFF through Trondheim Football District, although not without disagreement. This issue, along with a number of younger people joining the club, resulted in a generation change.

Trygve Falstad and Richard Olsen became the team's most important players, and at the same time started negotiating the right to join NFF. At that time, the football district did not want to accept additional clubs, stating that there were insufficient fields to play on, and that people wanting to play football were free to join existing clubs in the city. Olsen took over as club president in 1926 and sent an application to join the football district in July. It was passed by the district's board with a single decisive vote. Because of NFF's rules that no two clubs could have the same name, Odd changed its name to Rosenborg Ballklub.

== Pre-war years ==
Although being accepted in 1926, Rosenborg had a one-year quarantine before they were allowed to play in the regional league and first played in the league from the 1928 season. At the time, the district had leagues in two tiers, A and B, which played a single round robin tournament each summer season. Both in 1928 and 1929, Rosenborg won the league—the latter with six of six possible victories, but both times failed the promotion play-off, first against National and then against Rapp, both after extra time. In 1931, Rosenborg was successful, won all league games and beat National in the playoffs. The same year, the important player Øivind Skagen died of tuberculosis. The 1932 season was a failure; the team had no coach, and could go months without any training. The team lost three of four games, including 9–2 against Freidig. From that summer, the team introduced two trainings per week, but it was not sufficient to avoid relegation. The season also saw the club debut in the Norwegian Football Cup.

In January 1933, the club's star player Sigurd "Sikken" Fossum announced that he would transfer to SK Brage in the top league, the first incident of better clubs "fishing" a player in Central Norway. He criticized Rosenborg for not having sufficiently organized trainings, and in part because of this the trainings became more structured. The team succeeded at winning the 1934 B league and were again promoted to the A league after beating Rapp in a promotion play-off. But a revenge match against "Sikken" was not possible after he was killed in a work accident. At the end of the year, three more players left the club for Trondheims-Ørn, this time of political reasons. Rosenborg was located in a labor neighborhood, but had chosen to join NFF instead of the Workers' Federation of Sports (AIF). With the rising class awareness of the mid-1930s, socialist politicians and unionists encouraged people to take sides by instead joining worker sports clubs. Odd had considered joining AIF in the late 1920s, but mostly because of NFF's restrictive admittance policy. Nearly all members of the club were working-class, but the club's board stated that it was unnecessary to create politics out of sports.

In 1934, Rosenborg retained their place in the A league, placing fourth. In January 1935, the club established an ice hockey team. The goal was initially to establish a good training possibility for the players during the winter, when the city's football grounds were covered by ice and snow. The initiative was taken by Harald Petersen, Olav Fossum and Trygve Falstad, who were worried that the football team would again lose matches because they were outrun by the opponents. At first the training was done on a frozen lake at Lian, Liavannet. The following two seasons, Rosenborg were runners-up in the A league. In 1937, a lighting system was installed on the field at Solhaug, which allowed the pitch to be iced and training done on the field.

The 1937 season saw Rosenborg finish fifth in the A league, although for the first time advanced past the second round of the cup, reaching the round of 16, where they were beat 0–5 by Fredrikstad. From the 1937–38 season, the League of Norway was created, a national top league with 11 conferences with a play-off at the end of the season to establish a national champion. In the inaugural season, Rosenborg took part in a twelve-match, seven team league, ending sixth. The following season, Rosenborg won its conference and beat Kristiansund in the play-off quarter-final. In the semi-final, Skeid was held 0–0 until two minutes before the end of regular time, when Skeid scored the winning goal.

The 1939–40 season was canceled after the winter break because of the German invasion of Norway. Half-hearted attempts were made to keep sports running during the war, but by November 1940, the sports federations went on strike, ending all play for the duration of the occupation. Players from Rosenborg and other teams would secretly meet on remote fields in the evening and weekends and play unorganized matches, often with mixed teams. The teams were named Niffs and Fiffico, and results were announced on public places through cryptic poems not understandable by German soldiers. When people discussed players, names were never used, and instead they would be referred to by the teams they had played for. Rosenborg held training at local pitches, and would sometimes take day or week trips around Trøndelag to play friendly matches, often without or with fake travel permits. Throughout the Second World War, Rosenborgbanen was used by German soldiers who were stationed at Kristiansten Fortress.

== Promotions and relegations ==
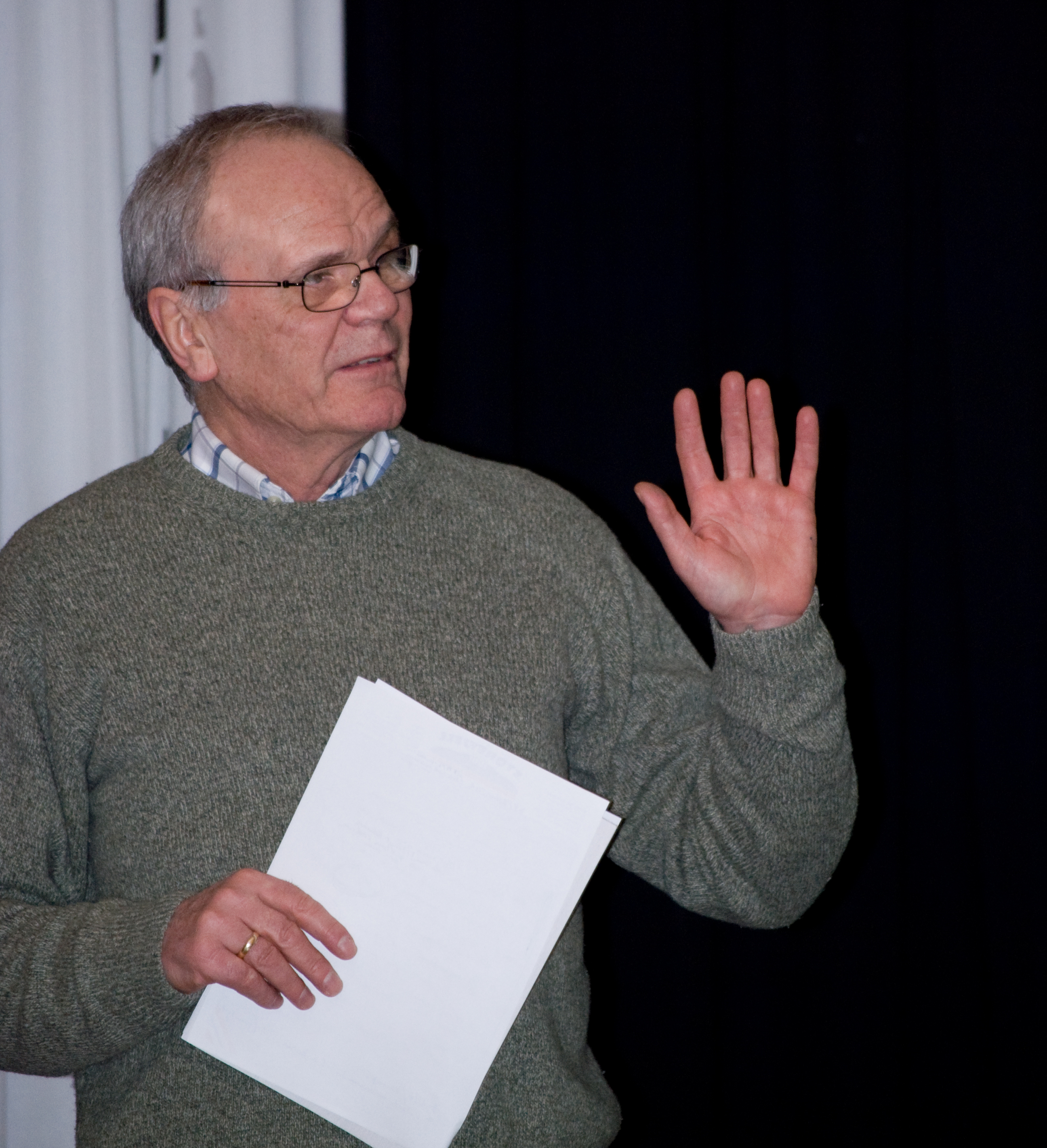
Eldar Hansen scored five goals during the two-match 1960 Cup Final

The first post-war game took place away against Buvik IL on 3 June 1945, first with the B-team losing 5–1 and then with the A-team winning 1–2. Sports clubs from Östersund in Sweden sent packages with shoes and kits to Rosenborg, resulting in Rosenborg's A-team playing in green kits and the other teams in white and red. The shoes were distributed to promising youth players, instead of the establish A-team players, to some of the older members' irritation. The 1945 season saw both a training tournament be played in Östersund, as well as Rosenborg win the A league and win the district championship after beating Falken 1–0—the team's first-ever title. Rosenborg also established a women's division, after initiative from 12 women, which entered the handball league. A handball team for men was established the following season, which won the district championships in its inaugural season.

The 1946–47 season saw the establishment of regional qualification leagues to determine which teams would qualify for the League of Norway. Rosenborg finished seventh in the league, and played the following year in the Third Division. In 1948, Harald Petersen resigned as president, after having held the position on and off since 1923, after NFF had excluded him after a professional boxer he had been manager for had played a match during the sports strike in 1941. However, he remained the team's head coach until 1954. The 1947–48 season saw Rosenborg win the conference league, but lose the promotion play-off. The following season, they again won the league, and this time succeeded at the promotion, allowing them to play in the Regional League in the 1949–50 season. Petersen used his Olympic silver-winning boxing client Henry Tiller and Hjalmar Andersen, later Olympic gold medalist in speed skating, to introduce new training methods in the club, which focused more on basic training, such as long-distance running and sit-ups. In the following three seasons, Rosenborg remained in the Regional League, finishing third in 1950–51, but finishing eight and last in the following season and being relegated back to Third Division. The team stayed two seasons there, finishing second in 1952–53, and winning the 1953–54 season, after Asbjørn Jøssund had taken over as manager and head coach.

The 1954–55 season saw the team remain in the Regional League, finishing fifth. In the 1955 Cup, the team reached the round of 16, where it lost marginally 4–2 against Larvik Turn, double-reigning Main League champions. The team was in need of younger players, with parts of the stem of the team retiring after the 1955 season. The 1955–56 season saw Rosenborg again relegated to the Third Division, just to see it win the following season and be promoted, to again finish last in the Regional League in the 1957–58 season and be relegated. In the 1958–59 season, Rosenborg won its conference of the Third Division for the fourth time in seven years, and the following year win its conference of the Regional League. The women's division was closed in 1958.

The team played in the Main League for the 1960–61 season, where it finished third in the Conference B. However, it was the cup which would make 1960 Rosenborg's break-through season. The previous season, the team had reached the round of 16, but in 1960 the team went all the way to the final, where it in the first match tied 3–3 against Odd, and in the second game won 3–2, with both games going into extra time, making Rosenborg Norwegian football champions. Five of Rosenborg's goals were scored by Eldar Hansen. In the 1961–62, Rosenborg entered the Marathon League, a 16-team, 30-game league which would last from the spring of 1961 to the fall of 1962, and allow the two conferences of the Main League to be merged into a single, top league—the ten-team First Division. John Krogh made his debut for Rosenborg that season, and also became the club's first player to play for the Norway national football team during 1962. The season also saw Rosenborg's first international friendly, losing 1–3 against Scotland's Dunfermline and 3–0 away. Rosenborg finished on ninth place, and missed the goal of reaching the First Division by two points and a single place.

Rosenborg was still not Trondheim's dominant football team, and clubs such as Brage, Falken, Freidig, Kvik, Nidelv and Ranheim were still capable of beating Rosenborg on a good day. Rosenborg signed forward Tor Kleveland ahead of the 1963 season, and still had the whole cup-winning team and Krogh, which made Rosenborg the most popular of the Trondheim teams. Up to 8,000 spectators would see matches at Lerkendal. The season ended with a third place, but afterwards Krogh transferred to Sweden's Högadal. Rosenborg again ended in third place in the league, behind Nidelv—the city's best team for the season. However, Rosenborg managed to reach the cup final, after beating Skeid in the round of 16, Vålerengen in the semi-finals, and won the cup after beating Sarpsborg 2–1 in the final. The season also saw a trip to Astrakhan in the Soviet Union.

In the 1965 season, forward Odd Iversen made his debut for the A team, scoring a hat trick against Kvik. That fall, Rosenborg played its first UEFA tournament, the Cup Winners' Cup. The first match was away against Iceland's KR Reykjavík, which Rosenborg won 3–1, a score repeated in the home match. In the second round, Rosenborg played Dynamo Kyiv; they lost 1–4 at home against a team featuring large parts of the Soviet Union national football team, while in the away match Rosenborg kept up with the Soviets, but finally lost 2–0. It is the only time Rosenborg has participated in the Cup Winners' Cup. In the final round, Rosenborg lost 1–2 against Brann, while Kvik lost 2–8 against Hødd, the exact score needed for Hødd to climb past Rosenborg on the table. Ahead of the 1966, Rosenborg lost a number of key players. Several new players were brought in, including reigning world champion in ski jumping, Bjørn Wirkola. The team won the league three rounds before the season end. The men's handball division was closed in 1966.

== Top league team ==
Nidelv's forward Harald Sunde, who played on the national team, transferred to Rosenborg. The forward duo were instrumental in Rosenborg's winning the 1967 First Division; other important players were Nils Arne Eggen, Jan Christiansen, Svein Haagenrud. After beating Brann 3–1 in front of 26,000 spectators at Lerkendal in the semi-final in the cup Rosenborg lost 1–4 against Lyn in the final. The 1968 season saw Rosenborg become runners-up in the league and reach the semi-finals in the cup. Iversen scored 30 goals in 18 league matches. The team also played Rapid Wien in the European Cup; the attendance of 22,492 spectators remains Rosenborg home European match record.

The following year, the Englishman George Curtis was hired as head coach. He broke with Rosenborg's tradition of playing offensive and entertaining football, and instead introduced a more rigid defensive strategy, with the wings often functioning as extra side backs. The number of scored goals decreased from 53 to 36, attendance fell, but the club won the league comfortably. The team played Southampton in the Inter-Cities Fairs Cup.

Up and till then, the selection of the team was made by a selection committee, while Curtis and his processors were coaches and not managers. Curtis demanded that if he was to continue as head coach, he was also to have the role as manager—the right to select the team. A selection committee, consisting of the former president Kjell Kruse, Eggen and Kleveland was selection, but Curtis given the right to select the team. Ahead of the 1970 season, Iversen and Sunde were sold to Belgium's Racing Mechelen for between NOK 200,000 and 300,000 each. To compensate, Geir Karlsen was brought in from Odd. The 1970 First Division resulted in even more defensive work, with the team securing a second place, with the team scoring 15 goals and only letting inn 5 goals in 18 matches. In the European Cup, the team lost 0–7 on aggregate against Standard Liège.

Curtis left Rosenborg after the season, and Eggen was hired as a new manager with Tor Røste Fossen as his assistant. He combined Curtis' defensive work with increased creativity in the offensive play, thus increasing the entertainment value and scoring more goals. With the strength of a strong back row, led by center backs Kåre Rønnes and Bjørn Rime, the club won its first double after beating Fredrikstad in the cup final. In the UEFA Cup, the team advanced past IFK Helsinki, and lost to Belgium's Lierse on the away goals rule. The following season started with a fall in enthusiasm among the players, and by mid-season was closer to relegation than a medal. The situation improved with the return of Hauge, and in the end the team ended in a fourth place and lost the cup final against Brann. In the European Cup, the club lost to Celtic.

The 1973 season saw Fossen take over as manager and Kleveland as president. Iversen returned from Belgium, after the club had raised the necessary NOK 130,000. Rosenborg ended as runners-up in both the league and the cup. The following season saw Rosenborg finish eighth in the league. In the UEFA Cup, Rosenborg went on its all-time biggest defeat, losing 1–9 against Hibernian. Rønning retired after the season, and became new manager along with Christiansen. The 1975 season ended with a fourth place in the league, and saw the break-through of Svein Grøndalen and Jan Hansen. After the season, Iversen transferred to Vålerengen.

Curtis had in the meantime become manager of the Norway national football team, a job he had held until mid-1974, when he was severely injured in a car accident, where his girlfriend was killed. He was rehired as Rosenborg manager for the 1976 season, but was weakened both physically and mentally after the accident. After a pre-season disagreement with him, Rime left for Røros in the Third Division. Rosenborg ended up losing for them in the cup. Curtis was fired in August, and Eggen, who had also taken over as manager of the national team, was hired as a consultant and de facto manager. In the league the club took an eighth place.

Rime was hired as coach ahead of the 1977 season, which ended in only a single win, last place in the league and relegation. The following season would see Rosenborg play a local derby for the first time in twelve years, against Strindheim, and the club management was worried that the relegation would be the end of the club's position as the city's premier team. The club moved its offices into a German barracks from the war, located outside Lerkendal and Eggen was again hired as coach. The season saw the break-through of three young players—Øivind Husby, Ola By Rise and Knut Torbjørn Eggen—and ended with Rosenborg winning the league and being promoted and Eggen becoming top scorer.

The following season saw Rosenborg finish sixth in the league. Ahead of the 1980 season, Iversen was bought from Vålerengen for NOK 50,000. The team finished fifth in the league. Rosenborg was missing a playmaker to lay in the central midfield. Ahead of the 1981 season, Rosenborg signed Sverre Brandhaug for NOK 100,000, the first time the club had to pay to sign local talent. The first 16 May game—held the evening before Constitution Day—was played that season, which became an annual event which most seasons became the most-spectated match. Attendance skyrocketed, with the Vålerengen match drawing 21,000 people. Although leading the league through most of the season, the team lost the four last matches, and ended in third place. Eggen concluded that while the team had many good individual players, they lacked sufficient cooperative coordination, which would later be the essence of his philosophy. In the 1982 season, where the team finished sixth in the league, Iversen was mostly used as a reserve; he retired afterwards and was given the club's first testimonial match.

Ahead of the 1983 season, Eggen chose to prioritize his teaching job, and Tommy Cavanagh was hired as manager. In Norwegian, the terms coach and manager are used interchangeably. Cavanagh had been coach for Manchester United, where he had done an excellent job at exactly that, but lacked abilities in team selection, tactics and inspiration. He used players in the wrong position, and instructed the ball to be kicked over the midfield, making it impossible to use the playmaker. He believed in breaking down the players and then building them up, and was unarguably good at the former. By the summer, his style was costing the club players: Eggen transferred to Orkanger in the Fourth Division, while Husby transferred to Brøndby in Denmark. Cavanagh was fired in August, at which time the club was second-last in the league, and Eggen took over as manager for the rest of the season. The team finished on a seventh place. President Erling Meirik withdrew as a consequence of the hiring, stating that in the future, the club should hire people based on more than their reputation and that they should seek judicial assistance with the contract.

Eggen had in 1982 proposed Bjørn Hansen as his successor, and after the Cavanagh incident, management hired Hansen. He was calm, pedagogical, tactical and continued with the same football philosophy as Eggen had been using. Forward Arne Dokken transferred from Panathinaikos and local talent defender Rune Bratseth was signed. The 1984 season resulted in a sixth place. Ahead of the 1985 season, Roger Albertsen, Trond Sollied and Gøran Sørloth were signed. In September, Hansen withdrew as manager at his own request, and was replaced by Dokken. The final game of the season would be a decisive match against Lillestrøm. The game set a Lerkendal attendance record of 28,569, and saw Rosenborg capture the league title after winning 1–0.

Torkild Brakstad was hired as manager ahead of the 1986 season. By July, after bad results, the players were in uproar and sent a formal letter to the management where they criticized most aspects of his work. Brakstad was fired in July, and Dokken was again hired as manager, on condition that he was also allowed to manage the team the following season. Dokken led the team to an eighth place in the league, and a victory over Linfield and loss for Red Star Belgrade in the European Cup. The 1987 season saw the odd rule that all league ties were to be determined with a penalty shootout, with a bonus point going to the winners. Along with moving games to Saturday, the goal was to make games more attractive. Instead, attendance hit rock bottom, with only 1,000 spectators watching the Lillestrøm game. Rosenborg had 11 penalty shootouts in 22 games, and lost 7 of them. The team finished fourth in the league.

== Eggen era ==
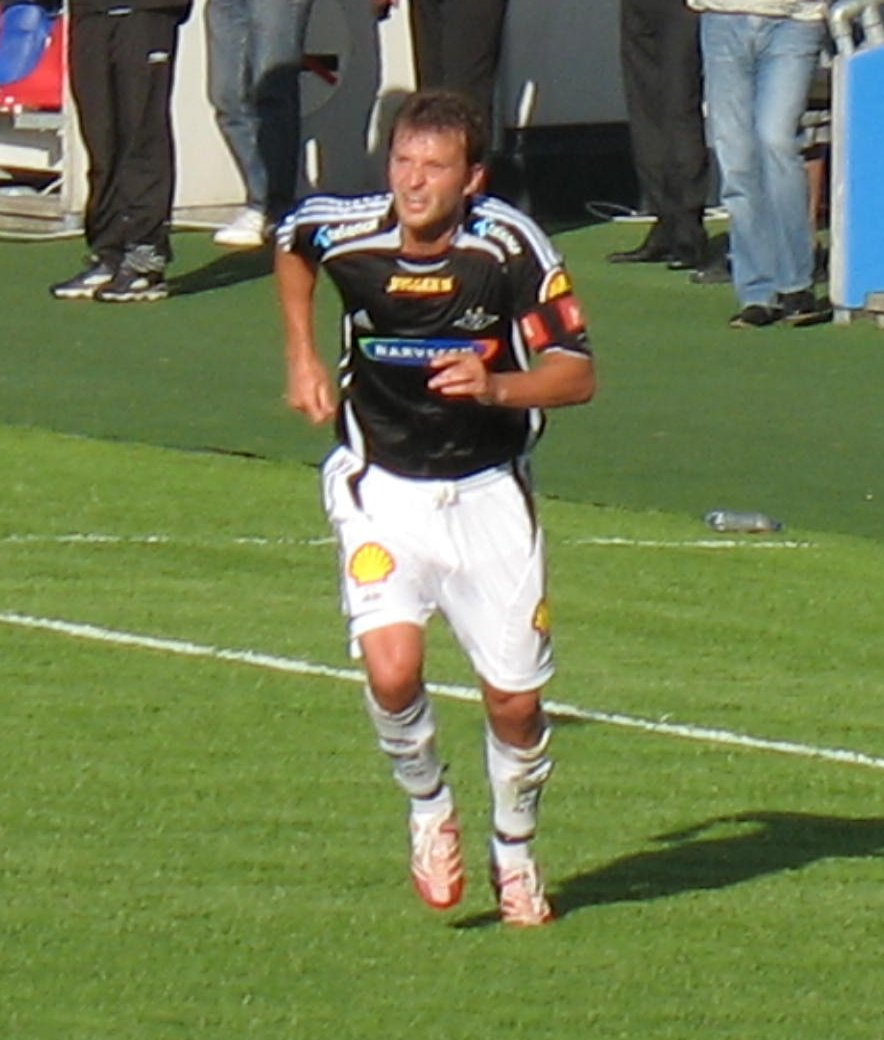
Roar Strand played 21 seasons for Rosenborg

Eggen had spent the last two season managing Moss, where he first had won the Second Division and then the First Division. A company, Rosenborg Sport A/S, was established to secure financing of the team, in cooperation with Forretningsbanken. The idea had been patronized by Eldar Hansen, who at the time was NFF president, and guaranteed that the necessary permissions would be given. Eggen was signed as coach, while Dokken took over as director of the new company. Two Bodø/Glimt players were signed, wing Mini Jakobsen and midfielder Ørjan Berg. The season saw Rosenborg claim the double, after beating Brann in two matches. It also saw Eldar Hansen return as president, after his period as NFF president was finished.

In the following season, the club lost 0–5 on aggregate against KV Mechelen in the European Cup and finished second in the league. After the season, By Rise attempted a transfer to Southampton, but this was stopped by the Professional Footballers' Association. The 1990 season saw Rosenborg win the double after beating Fyllingen in the cup final. In the UEFA Cup, the team lost 2–3 against the Soviet Chornomorets Odesa. The 1991 season saw the team be runners-up in both the cup and the league. The cup final was dominated by Rosenborg's reserve goalkeeper, Frode Olsen, who had been lent out to opponent Strømsgodset for the season. Eldar Hansen and half the press publicly supported replacing By Rise with Olsen. Rosenborg lost the cup final in part because of a poor match by Rise. The club lost against Italy's Sampdoria in the European Cup. Eggen stated that while the offensive 4-3-3 formation worked well in Norway against inferior teams, it was not as successful against superior teams for good football nations. Olsen was subsequently sold to Start.

After the season, Brandhaug retired, and was replaced by Bent Skammelsrud, who had been bought for a record NOK 600,000 during late 1990. Rosenborg signed the defender Stig Inge Bjørnebye, the midfielder Øyvind Leonhardsen and forward Tore André Dahlum. The 1992 season resulted the third double in five seasons, this time after winning the cup final against Lillestrøm. The team lost 3–5 on aggregate against Dynamo Moscow in the UEFA Cup. The season also saw criminal charges against Eldar Hansen and other members of the board, after it was discovered that the club had been conducting tax evasion, and the entire board had to withdraw and were fined. Nils Skutle was elected chairman in January 1993.

The 1993 season saw Rosenborg defend the league title for the first time; the team easily advanced past Luxembourg's Avenir Beggen, but lost marginally in the first round of Champions League to Austria Wien. At the time the national team was highly successful with Egil Olsen's defensive strategy, and some members of the press and players wanted Rosenborg to switch to a more defensive style, but this was rejected by Eggen. On 4 October 1993, a day after winning the league, several leading players demanded that Eggen withdraw, stating that they were not happy with his coaching style, particularly his behavior against individual players and his football knowledge. The following day, Eggen resigned as manager, but the resignation was not approved by the board. The issue was solved the same evening, when a compromise was reached regarding changes to Eggen's coaching style.

The 1994 season saw the return of the loaned-out players which would become central on the team: forward Harald Martin Brattbakk and midfielder Roar Strand. During the 1994 FIFA World Cup, Rosenborg players accounted for nearly a third of Norway's squad. In the UEFA Cup, Rosenborg won 1–0 home against Deportivo de La Coruña, and the Spanish team needed extra time to beat Rosenborg in the return match. The season also saw the trial of double matches in the cup semi-final, with Rosenborg losing 4–3 on aggregate against Molde, which would become on the club's main challengers the coming seasons.

By Rise retired ahead of the 1995 season and was replaced by Jørn Jamtfall. In the qualification, Rosenborg played Turkey's Beşiktaş. Rosenborg won the home match 3–0, and secured play in the group stage after losing 1–3 at İnönü Stadium. In the group stage, Rosenborg finished third, one point below Legia Warszawa, with Spartak Moscow finishing first and Blackburn Rovers last. Rosenborg took the double after beating Brann in the cup final.

Because only all-seater stadiums were to be allowed for UEFA matches from 1997, Rosenborg needed to expand Lerkendal, or face a limit of 2,800 spectators per game. A discussion with the municipality about ownership, the removal of the running track, and construction of new stands started. The Adidas Stand opened for the 1996 season. It saw Rosenborg qualify for Champions League by beating the previous season's semi-finalist, Panathinaikos. In the group stage, Rosenborg beat IFK Göteborg, at the time regarded as Scandinavia's best football club, in both matches, but failed to collect points against Porto. Ahead of the last match, against AC Milan at San Siro, Rosenborg needed to win to advance, after having lost 1–4 in the home match. The Norwegian team won 2–1, and met Juventus in the quarter-finals. After holding the reigning champions to 1–1, Rosenborg lost 2–0 at Stadio delle Alpi. Rosenborg beat Brann 10–0 and won the league five rounds before it finished.

The team's success in Europe increased foreign team's interest for the players. Iversen was sold in 1996, and in 1997 Rosenborg sold or lost as free agents, Løken, Bjørn Tore Kvarme, Trond Egil Soltvedt, Jon Olav Hjelde, Brattbakk and Ståle Stensaas. To compensate, side-back André Bergdølmo, forward Sigurd Rushfeldt and midfielder Runar Berg were bought. The 1997 season saw Rosenborg win the league with a record 87–20 goal difference, and qualify for Champions League by beating MTK Budapest. In the group stage, Rosenborg beat both Real Madrid and Porto 2–0, and Olympiacos 5–1 at Lerkendal, and only a last-minute goal by Olympiacos in the final 2–2 hindered Rosenborg from winning the group—in the unusual season that only group winners advanced to the quarter-finals.

The 1998 season saw Trond Sollied take over a manager for a season while Eggen took a sabbatical. Vegard Heggem was sold to Liverpool for a record NOK 44 million. Rosenborg won the league with only a single loss, but lost the cup final to Stabæk. Champions League participation was secured after beating Club Brugge on the away goal rule. In the group stage, both Rosenborg, Galatasaray and Juventus ended with 8 points, and Rosenborg not advancing on goal difference. The sales caused the continuity in the team was low, and only three who had been used during the Milan match, were used during the Juventus match.

Eggen returned ahead of the 1999 season, which also saw the sale of Rushfeldt and the purchase of John Carew. He had cost NOK 23 million, and was sold a year later for NOK 75 million. A new training ground was built outside Lerkendal, and the indoor Abrahallen was built for winter training. The season saw Rosenborg claim its seventh double and a walkover to the group stage of Champions League. Rosenborg became group winners after five matches, after among other things winning 0–3 at against Borussia Dortmund at Westfalenstadion.

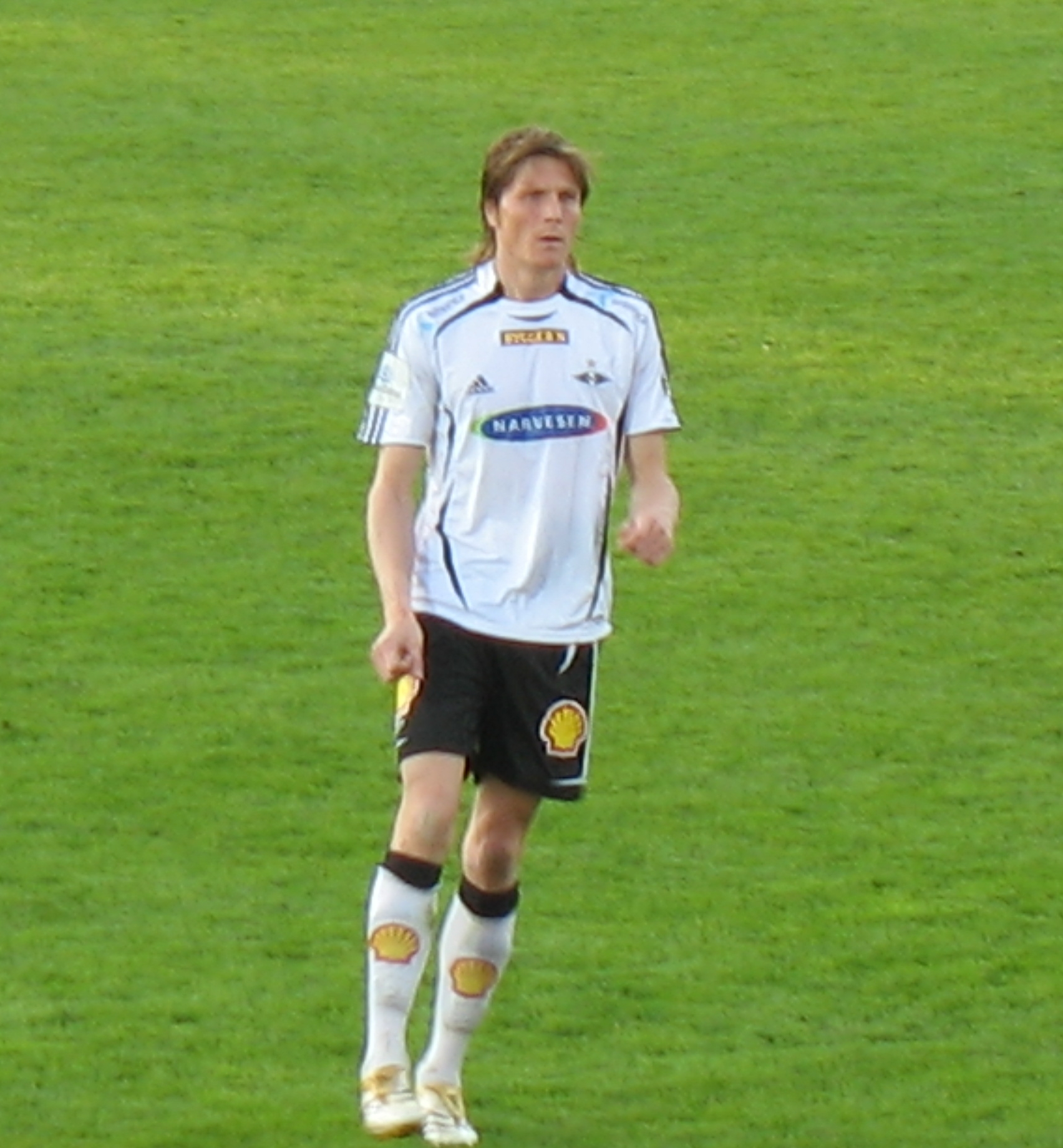
Frode Johnsen was signed in 2000 and stayed in Trondheim until 2006

The 2000 season saw Carew, Bergdølmo and Bragstad leave the club, and being replaced by forward Frode Johnsen. That year Rosenborg had the highest average player age in Champions League and was the only team to have played seven consecutive seasons in the group stage. While it saw a 6–0 victory over Helsingborg and 3–1 over Paris Saint-Germain at Lerkedal, the team lost 2–7 against the Paris team away. The 2001 season saw the return of Brattbakk and Stensaas. In Champions League, Rosenborg won only one game, and for the first time finish last in the group stage. Midway through the 2002 season, Eggen announced he would retire, and Åge Hareide was signed as manager. After a slow start to the season, Lyn had a ten-point lead, but Rosenborg eventually won the title. In September, Lerkendal was finished rebuilt as a modern all-seater, with a capacity for 21,166 spectators. In the Champions League group with Inter, Lyon and Ajax, Rosenborg failed to win a single victory, but managed four draws.

== Internationalization ==
One of Hareide's main priorities was to replace the aging key players with younger ones. Skammelsrud was the first to be retired, and the playmaker position was taken over by Ørjan Berg. He also increased the focus on defensive work. In the 2003 season, the team took the double, winning both the league and cup ahead of Bodø/Glimt. However, Rosenborg failed to beat Deportivo de La Coruña in the Champions League qualification, and instead played in the UEFA Cup. In September, Hareide was offered to take over as manager of the national team, after NFF had paid Rosenborg a large compensation.

By Rise, who had been assistant manager under both Hareide and Eggen since 1999, was hired as manager ahead of the 2004 season, with a two-year contract. By Rise brought the club to Champions League, but failed to win any games in the group stage. Two games before then end of the league, Rosenborg had not won a game in a month. By Rise was told he would have to withdraw after the season. Rosenborg won the match against Bodø/Glimt, and before the final round had the same number of points and goal difference as Vålerenga, although Rosenborg had more goals scored. In the simultaneous last matches, Rosenborg won 4–1 and Vålerenga won 3–0, securing Rosenborg their thirteens consecutive title on goals scored. The season also saw the first of three editions of the Scandinavian post-season Royal League. Rosenborg advanced to the second group stage, but did not advance from there.

Per Joar Hansen, By Rise's assistant, took over for the 2005 season, with Eggen as a mentor and Rune Skarsfjord and Bjørn Hansen as an assistants. It also saw the return of Kvarme, the purchase of defender Alejandro Lago, and the retirement of Hoftun. Alexander Tettey and Per Ciljan Skjelbred established themselves on the team, along with Swede Mikael Dorsin. By the summer break, Per Joar Hansen felt that Eggen was too dominant, and wanted him removed. After the team had lost 1–2 against Lillestrøm on 7 August, and it was clear the team would not win the league, Hansen resigned. Per-Mathias Høgmo was hired the following day. He qualified Rosenborg for Champions League after beating Steaua București, but only managed a seventh place in the league, having lost a higher percentage of games than Hansen.

The 2006 season saw Rosenborg not participate in an UEFA tournament for the first time since 1988. Steffen Iversen was bought, and would become the team's top scorer four of the following five seasons, along with Daniel Braaten and Marek Sapara. Høgmo hired a series of additional specialized coaches, including a mental coach, a fitness coach, a development coach and Knut Tørum as assistant. By July, Høgmo was burned out—in part because of pressure from journalist caused by mediocre results and constant changes to the positions—and Tørum took over as acting manager. He succeeded in changing the flow, and won the league after beating Brann two rounds before the end of the season.

Høgmo never returned, and Tørum became permanent manager for the 2007 season, but withdrew five games before the end of the season, leaving his assistant Trond Henriksen with the manager position. The club finished fifth in the league, but managed to reach Champions League, where the team won both legs against Valencia 2–0, and tied Chelsea at Stamford Bridge.

Erik Hamrén was hired as a new manager, but his existing contract hindered him starting until July, so Henriksen continued until then. When he took over the team, it was in ninth place, and he brought up to fifth by the end of the season. The club qualified for the UEFA Cup by co-winning the Intertoto Cup after beating NAC Breda; in the UEFA Cup, Rosenborg advanced to the group stage. In his second season, Hamrén succeed at winning the league, although the club lost for Kazakhstan's Qarabağ in the qualification for the Europa League and lost 5–0 for Molde in the cup quarter-final. Hamrén left the club midways during the 2010 season to become manager for Sweden. Eggen took over as manager again, and led them to the league title, without having lost a single league match. After advancing past Linfield and AIK, Rosenborg lost against Copenhagen on the away goal rule to play in Champions League, and instead played the group stage of the Europa League.

== See also ==
- List of Rosenborg BK seasons, for a statistical breakdown by season
