= List of Eliteserien players =

This is a list of Eliteserien players who have made 300 or more appearances in the Eliteserien. Statistics are updated as of 21 August 2022. Current Eliteserien players are shown in bold.

| Name | Nationality | Position | Apps | Goals | Club(s) | Years | Ref. |
|---|---|---|---|---|---|---|---|
| Daniel Berg Hestad | Norway | MF | 473 | 72 | Molde | 1993–2015 | |
| Morten Berre | Norway | FW | 452 | 102 | Skeid, Haugesund, Viking, Vålerenga | 1996–2015 | |
| Frode Kippe | Norway | DF | 441 | 44 | Lillestrøm | 1997–2019 | |
| Roar Strand | Norway | MF | 439 | 88 | Rosenborg, Molde | 1989–2010 | |
| Øyvind Storflor | Norway | MF | 421 | 70 | Rosenborg, Moss, Strømsgodset, Ranheim | 1999–2019 | |
| Espen Hoff | Norway | MF | 406 | 95 | Odd, Lyn, Stabæk, Start | 1999–2016 | |
| **Steffen Hagen** | Norway | DF | 404 | 12 | Odd | 2004– | |
| **Erling Knudtzon** | Norway | MF | 388 | 53 | Lyn, Lillestrøm, Molde | 2007– | |
| Christer Basma | Norway | DF | 350 | 8 | Kongsvinger, Stabæk, Rosenborg | 1993–2008 | |
| Håkon Opdal | Norway | GK | 347 | 1 | Brann, Start | 2002–2021 | |
| Ola By Rise | Norway | GK | 346 | 0 | Rosenborg | 1977–1995 | |
| Runar Berg | Norway | MF | 345 | 65 | Bodø/Glimt, Rosenborg, Lyn | 1989–2009 | |
| Jone Samuelsen | Norway | MF | 338 | 27 | Viking, Odd | 2003–2019 | |
| Freddy dos Santos | Norway | DF | 337 | 38 | Skeid, Molde, Vålerenga | 1996–2011 | |
| Trond Olsen | Norway | MF | 336 | 72 | Bodø/Glimt, Lillestrøm, Rosenborg, Viking | 2001–2018 | |
| Erik Hoftun | Norway | DF | 335 | 19 | Molde, Rosenborg, Bodø/Glimt | 1992–2007 | |
| Bjørn Johansen | Norway | MF | 333 | 32 | Tromsø, Viking | 1987–2005 | |
| Svein Mathisen | Norway | FW | 327 | 106 | Start | 1973–1989 | |
| Arild Sundgot | Norway | FW | 325 | 111 | Hødd, Lillestrøm | 1995–2012 | |
| Tommy Svindal Larsen | Norway | MF | 324 | 20 | Start, Stabæk, Odd | 1991–2011 | |
| Vegard Forren | Norway | DF | 322 | 11 | Molde, Brann | 2008–2021 | |
| Fredrik Kjølner | Norway | DF | 319 | 7 | Vålerenga, Molde, Bodø/Glimt, Sandefjord | 1994–2007 | |
| Jan-Derek Sørensen | Norway | FW | 319 | 79 | Lyn, Bodø/Glimt, Rosenborg, Vålerenga | 1992–2009 | |
| André Danielsen | Norway | DF | 318 | 26 | Viking | 2003–2019 | |
| Fredrik Nordkvelle | Norway | MF | 316 | 45 | Strømsgodset, Brann, Odd | 2007–2020 | |
| Simen Brenne | Norway | MF | 315 | 59 | Moss, Fredrikstad, Lillestrøm, Odd, Strømsgodset, Sarpsborg 08 | 2000–2015 | |
| Trygve Nygaard | Norway | MF | 312 | 19 | Haugesund, Viking | 1997–2013 | |
| Magne Hoseth | Norway | MF | 311 | 88 | Molde, Vålerenga, Stabæk, Viking, Aalesund, Kristiansund | 1999–2017 | |
| **Jonatan Tollås** | Norway | DF | 309 | 15 | Aalesund, Vålerenga | 2007– | |
| Arne Vidar Moen | Norway | DF | 309 | 13 | Tromsø, Brann, Lillestrøm | 1991–2005 | |
| **André Hansen** | Norway | GK | 308 | 0 | Lillestrøm, Odd, Rosenborg | 2009– | |
| Tom Gulbrandsen | Norway | MF | 307 | 59 | Mjøndalen, Lillestrøm | 1983–1997 | |
| André Muri | Norway | DF | 307 | 17 | Stabæk, Vålerenga, Odd | 2000–2014 | |
| Torgeir Bjarmann | Norway | DF | 306 | 37 | Lillestrøm | 1988–2003 | |
| Charles Berstad | Norway | DF | 303 | 10 | Kongsvinger, Bodø/Glimt | 1983–1998 | |
| Morten Fevang | Norway | DF | 301 | 45 | Odd | 1998–2013 | |
| Frode Johnsen | Norway | FW | 301 | 132 | Odd, Rosenborg | 1999–2015 | |
| Martin Andresen | Norway | MF | 300 | 61 | Moss, Viking, Stabæk, Molde, Brann, Vålerenga, Sandefjord | 1996–2015 | |
