= List of Rosenborg BK seasons =

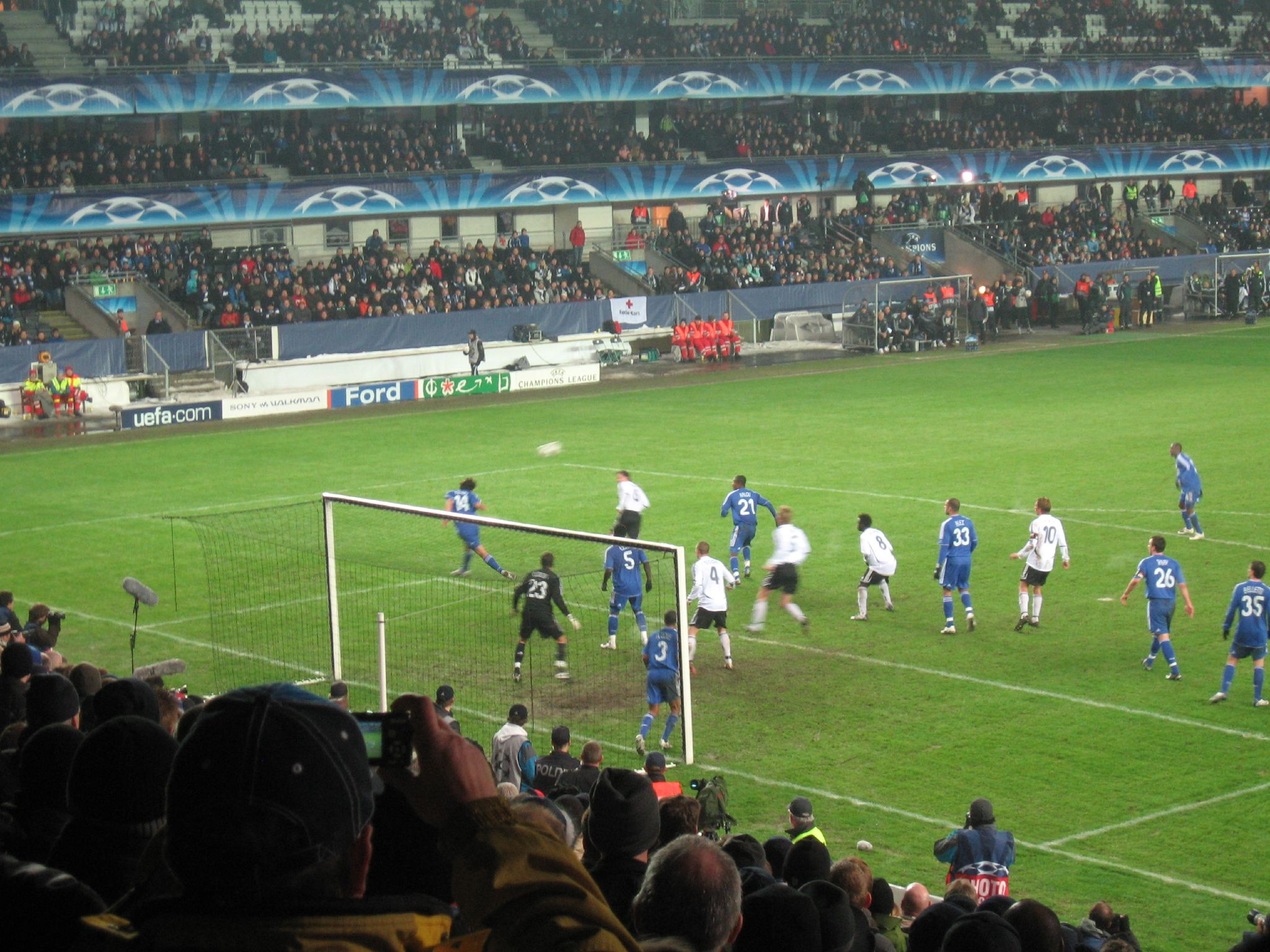
Rosenborg (white) playing Chelsea (blue) in a 2007–08 UEFA Champions League match at Lerkendal Stadion

Rosenborg Ballklub is an association football club based in Trondheim, Norway. It is Norway's most successful club, having won the Norwegian Premier League twenty-six times and the Norwegian Football Cup twelwe times. Although founded in 1917, it was not permitted to play Football Association of Norway-sanctioned matches until 1928 because of restrictions on the number of teams allowed to join the regional football association. It then joined the regional Class B and went through several promotions and relegations until joining the inaugural eleven-conference top-tier League of Norway in 1937–38. After World War II, the club moved between the Third Division and the Regional League (second tier), seeing promotion or relegation more seasons than not. The club reached the Main League in 1960–61, but was subsequently relegated after the 1961–62 season.

After four years at tier two, Rosenborg joined the First Division in 1967 and won the league that season. Since, Rosenborg has only played the 1978 season at the second tier. The First Division was renamed the Norwegian Premier League in 1991. The club entered the cup for the first time in 1932, claiming its first title in 1960. Rosenborg has experienced two golden eras; the first in the 1960s and early 1970s resulted in three league and three cup honors, in addition to an equal number of runner-up positions in both tournaments. The second golden era started with winning the league in 1985 and has resulted in nineteen league and six cup titles. Fourteen league titles were claimed under manager Nils Arne Eggen and sixteen have been won by midfielder Roar Strand. Rosenborg won thirteen consecutive league trophies between 1992 and 2004.

Rosenborg has played 206 matches in 32 seasons in Union of European Football Associations (UEFA) tournaments, starting with the 1965–66 European Cup Winners' Cup. Their only European trophy came when they co-won the 2008 UEFA Intertoto Cup. Rosenborg has entered the UEFA Champions League and its predecessor, the European Cup, twenty times, and reached the group stage eleven times, including eight consecutive seasons from 1995–96 though 2002–03. The best performance is reaching the quarter-finals in 1996–97, where they lost to Juventus. Rosenborg has played 16 seasons in the UEFA Europa League and its predecessors, the UEFA Cup and the Inter-Cities Fairs Cup. The club has also won the 2010 Superfinalen, Norway's defunct two-season super cup, and participated twice in the Royal League.

== Key ==
League table key

- P = Played
- W = Games won
- D = Games drawn
- L = Games lost
- F = Goals for
- A = Goals against
- Pts = Points
- Pos = Final position
- Att = Average attendance

Competition key

- LoN = League of Norway
- ML = Main League
- TL = Tippeligaen
- ES = Eliteserien
- 1D = First Division
- 2D = Second Division
- 3D = Third Division
- RL = Regional League
- RLQ = Regional League Qualifier
- A = Class A
- B = Class B
- CL = Champions League
- EL = Europa League
- ECL = Europa Conference League

Position key

- W = Winner
- CO = Co-winner
- RU = Runners-up
- SF = Semi-finals
- QF = Quarter-finals
- G = Group stage
- G2 = Second group stage
- PO = Play-off round
- Q1 = First qualifying round
- Q2 = Second qualifying round
- Q3 = Third qualifying round
- R1 = Round 1
- R2 = Round 2
- R3 = Round 3
- R4 = Round 4
- R32 = Round of 32

Champions	Runners-up	Promoted ↑	Relegated ↓	Top scorer in Rosenborg's league ♦

== Seasons ==
The following is a list of Rosenborg BK's seasons since they were permitted to play in Football Association of Norway-sanction matches from the 1928 season. It contains the results of the league, including the division, position and average league attendance; the result in the Norwegian Football Cup; participation in other official tournaments, including promotion and relegation play-offs, Champions League and Europa League; and the top goalscorer for the club in the domestic league and the number of goals he scored.

Rosenborg BK seasons
Season	League											Cup	Other competitions				Top goalscorer		Ref(s)
Season	Division	P	W	D	L	GF	GA	GD	Pts	Pos	Att	Cup	Other	CL	EL	ECL	Name	Goals	Ref(s)
1928	B	5	5	1	1	13	5	+8	5	1st	—	—	Play-off – Not promoted	—	—	—	—	—	
1929	B	6	6	0	0	25	6	+19	12	1st	—	—	Play-off – Not promoted	—	—	—	—	—	
1930	B	6	5	0	1	46	7	+39	10	2nd	—	—	—	—	—	—	—	—	
1931	B ↑	6	6	0	0	24	6	+18	12	1st	—	—	Play-off – Promoted	—	—	—	—	—	
1932	A ↓	4	1	0	3	5	18	−13	2	5th	—	R1	Play-off – Relegated	—	—	—	—	—	
1933	B ↑	6	6	0	0	20	7	+13	12	1st	—	Q2	Play-off – Promoted	—	—	—	—	—	
1934	A	8	3	1	4	20	7	+13	7	4th	—	R2	—	—	—	—	—	—	
1935	A	8	3	2	3	15	10	+5	8	2nd	—	R1	—	—	—	—	—	—	
1936	A	8	4	1	3	19	14	+5	9	2nd	—	R1	—	—	—	—	—	—	
1937	A	5	2	0	3	14	11	+3	4	5th	—	R4	—	—	—	—	—	—	
1937–38	LoN	12	4	0	8	22	37	−15	8	7th	—	R2	—	—	—	—	—	—	
1938–39	LoN	12	7	3	2	38	19	+19	17	1st	—	R3	Play-off – SF	—	—	—	—	—	
1939–40 (Note: The 1939–40 League of Norway was canceled mid-season due to the break-out of World War II)	LoN	—	—	—	—	—	—	—	—	—	—	R1	—	—	—	—	—	—	
1945	A	4	3	1	0	15	1	+14	7	1st	—	R1	Play-off – W	—	—	—	—	—	
1946–47	RLQ ↓	18	5	5	8	31	39	−8	15	7th	—	R2	—	—	—	—	—	—	
1947–48	3D	16	13	3	0	75	18	+57	29	1st	—	R1	—	—	—	—	—	—	
1948–49	3D ↑	14	9	2	3	49	19	+30	20	1st	—	R2	—	—	—	—	—	—	
1949–50	RL	14	6	2	6	23	30	−7	14	5th	—	R1	—	—	—	—	—	—	
1950–51	RL	14	7	2	5	20	19	+1	16	3rd	—	R1	—	—	—	—	—	—	
1951–52	RL ↓	14	1	2	11	14	42	−28	4	8th	—	R1	—	—	—	—	—	—	
1952–53	3D	12	7	2	3	26	20	+6	16	2nd	—	R1	—	—	—	—	—	—	
1953–54	3D ↑	12	8	3	1	34	11	+23	19	1st	—	Q1	—	—	—	—	—	—	
1954–55	RL	14	6	1	7	28	24	+4	13	5th	—	R2	—	—	—	—	—	—	
1955–56	RL ↓	14	3	4	7	15	27	−12	10	6th	—	R4	—	—	—	—	—	—	
1956–57	3D ↑	14	11	2	1	47	16	+31	24	1st	—	R3	—	—	—	—	—	—	
1957–58	RL ↓	14	2	1	11	20	35	−15	5	8th	—	Q2	—	—	—	—	—	—	
1958–59	3D ↑	14	12	1	1	95	8	+87	25	1st	—	R2	—	—	—	—	—	—	
1959–60	RL ↑	14	10	1	3	43	15	+28	21	1st	—	R4	—	—	—	—	—	—	
1960–61	ML (B)	14	6	4	4	28	28	0	16	3rd	—	W	—	—	—	—	—	—	
1961–62	ML ↓	30	13	3	13	55	60	−5	29	9th	—	QF (1961); SF (1962)	—	—	—	—	—	—	
1963	2D	14	6	4	4	36	23	+13	16	3rd	—	R3	—	—	—	—	—	—	
1964	2D	14	6	3	5	22	19	+3	15	3rd	—	W	—	—	—	—	—	—	
1965	2D	14	8	3	3	36	20	+16	19	2nd	—	R3	Cup Winner's Cup – R2	—	—	—	—	—	
1966	2D ↑	14	12	1	1	38	11	+27	25	1st	—	R4	—	—	—	—	—	—	
1967	1D	18	9	7	2	40	24	+16	25	1st	11,126	RU	—	—	—	—	Odd Iversen	17 ♦	
1968	1D	18	11	2	5	53	29	+24	24	2nd	11,748	SF	—	R1	—	—	Odd Iversen	30 ♦	
1969	1D	18	13	1	4	36	15	+21	27	1st	13,948	QF	—	—	R1	—	Odd Iversen	26 ♦	
1970	1D	18	10	4	4	15	5	+10	24	2nd	7,853	R4	—	R1	—	—	Erling Meirik	5	
1971	1D	18	9	6	3	25	11	+14	24	1st	8,434	W	—	—	R2	—	Arne Hanssen; Bjørn Wirkola	6	
1972	1D	22	6	10	6	22	19	+3	22	4th	6,702	RU	—	R1	—	—	Arne Hanssen	9	
1973	1D	22	10	7	5	32	18	+14	27	2nd	8,579	RU	—	—	—	—	Odd Iversen	9	
1974	1D	22	9	5	8	39	31	+8	23	8th	7,605	R4	—	—	R1	—	Odd Iversen	11	
1975	1D	22	11	5	6	36	28	+8	27	4th	9,604	SF	—	—	—	—	Odd Iversen	9	
1976	1D	22	7	7	8	24	29	−5	21	8th	6,584	R2	—	—	—	—	Magnar Florholmen	11	
1977	1D ↓	22	1	5	16	17	48	−31	7	12th	5,245	R4	—	—	—	—	Steinar Nilssen; Kjell Øyasæther	3	
1978	2D ↑	18	11	5	2	42	15	+27	27	1st	2,549	QF	—	—	—	—	Knut Torbjørn Eggen	10	
1979	1D	22	9	4	9	31	29	+2	22	6th	9,249	QF	—	—	—	—	Viggo Sundmoen; Jørgen Sørlie	7	
1980	1D	22	9	5	8	42	36	+6	23	5th	9,549	R4	—	—	—	—	Viggo Sundmoen	11	
1981	1D	22	9	8	5	35	24	+11	26	3rd	13,068	R4	—	—	—	—	Odd Iversen	9	
1982	1D	22	7	9	6	32	29	+3	23	6th	7,933	R3	—	—	—	—	Sverre Brandhaug	9	
1983	1D	22	7	7	8	41	38	+3	21	7th	7,571	R4	—	—	—	—	Håvard Moen	8	
1984	1D	22	8	7	7	36	37	−1	23	6th	7,371	QF	—	—	—	—	Sverre Brandhaug	13 ♦	
1985	1D	22	15	3	4	43	33	+10	33	1st	10,323	R4	—	—	—	—	Gøran Sørloth	12	
1986	1D	22	8	5	9	28	28	0	21	8th	6,529	SF	—	R2	—	—	Sverre Brandhaug	7	
1987	1D	22	8	4	7	33	25	+8	28	4th	5,213	SF	—	—	—	—	André Nieuwlaat	9	
1988	1D	22	14	5	3	33	25	+8	47	1st	12,070	W	—	—	—	—	Sverre Brandhaug	10	
1989	1D	22	13	5	4	56	29	+27	44	2nd	12,065	QF	—	R1	—	—	Mini Jakobsen	18 ♦	
1990	TL	22	13	5	4	60	24	+36	44	1st	11,115	W	—	—	R1	—	Mini Jakobsen	17	
1991	TL	22	10	6	6	38	28	+10	36	2nd	11,451	RU	—	R1	—	—	Karl Petter Løken	12 ♦	
1992	TL	22	14	4	4	58	19	+39	46	1st	13,569	W	—	—	R1	—	Tore André Dahlum	13	
1993	TL	22	14	5	3	47	30	+17	47	1st	11,750	R4	—	R1	—	—	Gøran Sørloth	7	
1994	TL	22	15	4	3	70	23	+47	49	1st	11,061	SF	—	—	R1	—	Harald Martin Brattbakk	17 ♦	
1995	TL	26	19	5	2	78	29	+49	62	1st	10,280	W	—	G	—	—	Harald Martin Brattbakk	17 ♦	
1996	TL	26	18	5	3	82	26	+56	59	1st	11,062	R4	—	QF	—	—	Harald Martin Brattbakk	26 ♦	
1997	TL	26	18	7	1	87	20	+67	61	1st	11,338	QF	—	G	—	—	Sigurd Rushfeldt	25 ♦	
1998	TL	26	20	3	3	79	23	+56	63	1st	13,163	RU	—	G	—	—	Sigurd Rushfeldt	27 ♦	
1999	TL	26	18	2	6	79	23	+56	56	1st	13,359	W	—	G2	—	—	Sigurd Rushfeldt	15	
2000	TL	26	16	6	4	61	26	+35	54	1st	11,944	R3	—	G	R3	—	Frode Johnsen	9	
2001	TL	26	17	6	3	71	30	+41	57	1st	12,070	R3	—	G	—	—	Frode Johnsen	17 ♦	
2002	TL	26	17	5	4	57	30	+27	56	1st	14,626	R4	—	G	—	—	Harald Martin Brattbakk	17 ♦	
2003	TL	26	19	4	3	68	28	+40	61	1st	15,825	W	—	Q3	R3	—	Harald Martin Brattbakk	17 ♦	
2004	TL	26	14	6	6	52	34	+18	48	1st	17,395	QF	Royal League – G2	G	—	—	Frode Johnsen	19 ♦	
2005	TL	26	10	4	12	50	42	+8	34	7th	17,541	R4	—	G	R32	—	Thorstein Helstad	13	
2006	TL	26	15	8	3	47	24	+23	53	1st	19,440	SF	Royal League – G	—	—	—	Steffen Iversen	17	
2007	TL	26	12	5	9	53	39	+14	41	5th	19,903	R4	—	G	R32	—	Steffen Iversen	13	
2008	TL	26	11	6	9	40	34	+6	39	5th	18,957	R2	Intertoto Cup – CW (Note: Rosenborg was one of 11 teams to advance to the 2008–09 UEFA Cup by winning all their stages of the 2008 UEFA Intertoto Cup. Braga advanced the furthest in the UEFA Cup and was declared the overall winner.)	—	G	—	Steffen Iversen	10	
2009	TL	30	20	9	1	60	22	+38	69	1st	17,635	QF	—	—	Q2	—	Rade Prica	17 ♦	
2010	TL	30	19	11	0	58	24	+34	68	1st	16,911	SF	Superfinalen – W	PO	G	—	Steffen Iversen	14	
2011	TL	30	14	7	9	69	44	+25	49	3rd	14,511	QF	—	Q3	PO	—	Rade Prica	16	
2012	TL	30	15	10	5	53	26	+27	55	3rd	13,394	R4	—	—	G	—	Rade Prica	11	
2013	TL	30	18	8	4	50	25	+25	62	2nd	14,806	RU	—	—	Q2	—	John Chibuike	9	
2014	TL	30	18	6	6	64	43	+21	60	2nd	13,915	R3	—	—	Q3	—	Alexander Søderlund	13	
2015	TL	30	21	6	3	73	27	+46	69	1st	18,039	W	—	—	G	—	Alexander Søderlund	22 ♦	
2016	TL	30	21	6	3	65	25	+40	69	1st	17,585	W	—	Q3	PO	—	Christian Gytkjær	19 ♦	
2017	ES	30	18	7	5	57	20	+37	61	1st	17,593	QF	Mesterfinalen – W	Q3	G	—	Nicklas Bendtner	19 ♦	
2018	ES	30	19	7	4	51	24	+27	64	1st	16,424	W	Mesterfinalen – W	Q2	G	—	Alexander Søderlund	8	
2019	ES	30	14	10	6	53	41	+12	52	3rd	12,704	R4	Mesterfinalen Cancelled	PO	G	—	Alexander Søderlund	8	
2020	ES	30	15	7	8	50	35	+15	52	4th	307 (Note: Restrictions due to COVID-19 pandemic)	Cancelled	—	—	PO	—	Kristoffer Zachariassen; Dino Islamović	12	
2021	ES	30	13	9	8	58	42	+16	48	5th	6,577 (Note: Restrictions due to COVID-19 pandemic)	R3	—	—	—	PO	Stefano Vecchia	11	
2022	ES	30	16	8	6	69	44	+25	56	3rd	13,092	R4	—	—	—	—	Casper Tengstedt	15	
2023	ES	30	11	6	13	46	50	-4	39	9th	14,098	R2	—	—	—	Q3	Ole Sæter	8	
2024	ES	30	16	5	9	52	39	+13	53	4th	13,816	R3	—	—	—	—	Ole Sæter	10	
2025	ES	30	11	9	10	45	42	+3	42	7th	14,443	QF	—	—	—	PO	Dino Islamović	14	
2026	ES (In progress)	26	14	4	8	53	32	+21	46	3rd	13,670	R4	—	—	—	—	Amin Chiakha	18	

== See also ==
- The Invincibles (football)

== Notes ==
Notes
