= 1996 Rosenborg BK season =

Rosenborg
1996 season
- Manager: Nils Arne Eggen
- Stadium: Lerkendal Stadion
- Tippeligaen: 1st
- Norwegian Cup: Fourth round
- Champions League: Quarter-finals
- Top goalscorer: League: Harald Brattbakk (28); All: Harald Brattbakk (41)
- Average home league attendance: 11,062

The 1996 season was Rosenborg's 18th consecutive year in Tippeligaen, their 33rd season in the top flight of Norwegian football and 17th season with Nils Arne Eggen as manager. They participated in Tippeligaen, the Cup and the 1996–97 UEFA Champions League, entering at the qualifying round stage.

== Squad ==
Squad at end of season

Note: Flags indicate national team as defined under FIFA eligibility rules; some limited exceptions apply. Players may hold more than one non-FIFA nationality.

No.	Pos.	Nation	Player
—	GK	NOR	Jørn Jamtfall
—	GK	NOR	Thomas André Ødegaard
—	DF	NOR	Bjørn Otto Bragstad
—	DF	NOR	Vegard Heggem
—	DF	NOR	Jon Olav Hjelde
—	DF	NOR	Erik Hoftun
—	DF	NOR	Bjørn Tore Kvarme
—	DF	NOR	Karl Petter Løken
—	DF	NOR	Ståle Stensaas
—	DF	NOR	Stian Tømmerdal
—	MF	NOR	Karl Oskar Fjørtoft

No.	Pos.	Nation	Player
—	MF	NOR	Bent Skammelsrud
—	MF	NOR	Tom Kåre Staurvik
—	MF	NOR	Trond Egil Soltvedt
—	MF	NOR	Kristian Sørli
—	MF	NOR	Roar Strand
—	MF	NOR	Fredrik Winsnes
—	MF	NOR	Johan-Petter Winsnes
—	FW	NOR	Harald Brattbakk
—	FW	NOR	Steffen Iversen
—	FW	NOR	Mini Jakobsen

=== Left club during season ===
Note: Flags indicate national team as defined under FIFA eligibility rules; some limited exceptions apply. Players may hold more than one non-FIFA nationality.

No.	Pos.	Nation	Player
—	MF	NOR	Kåre Ingebrigtsen (to Lillestrøm)

== Transfers ==
=== Out ===
- (Norway) Tom Kåre Staurvik - (Netherlands) NAC Breda
- (Norway) Steffen Iversen - (England) Tottenham Hotspur, £2,500,000, December
- (Norway) Kåre Ingebrigtsen - (Norway) Lillestrøm

== Results ==
=== Tippeligaen ===
==== Table ====
Pos	Team	Pld	W	D	L	GF	GA	GD	Pts	Qualification or relegation
1	Rosenborg (C)	26	18	5	3	82	26	+56	59	Qualification for the Champions League second qualifying round
2	Lillestrøm	26	13	7	6	54	36	+18	46	Qualification for the UEFA Cup second qualifying round
3	Viking	26	12	7	7	50	32	+18	43	Qualification for the UEFA Cup first qualifying round
4	Brann	26	11	9	6	64	50	+14	42	Qualification for the UEFA Cup first qualifying round
5	Tromsø	26	11	8	7	46	41	+5	41	Qualification for the Cup Winners' Cup first round

Source: fotball.no
Rules for classification: 1) points; 2) goal difference; 3) number of goals scored.
(C) Champions

=== Champions League ===
==== Qualifying round ====
7 August 1996 1st leg	Panathinaikos (Greece)	1–0	(Norway) Rosenborg	Athens, Greece
21:15	Warzycha 19'	Report		Stadium: Olympic Stadium; Attendance: 33,095; Referee: Michel Piraux (Belgium)

21 August 1996 2nd leg	Rosenborg (Norway)	3–0 (a.e.t.) (3–1 agg.)	(Greece) Panathinaikos	Trondheim, Norway
19:30	Strand 63'; Iversen 94'; Heggem 97'	Report		Stadium: Lerkendal Stadion; Attendance: 18,625; Referee: Paul Durkin (Scotland)

==== Group stage ====
Pos	Team	Pld	W	D	L	GF	GA	GD	Pts	Qualification
1	(Portugal) Porto	6	5	1	0	12	4	+8	16	Advance to knockout stage
2	(Norway) Rosenborg	6	3	0	3	7	11	−4	9	Advance to knockout stage
3	(Italy) Milan	6	2	1	3	13	11	+2	7	
4	(Sweden) IFK Göteborg	6	1	0	5	7	13	−6	3	

Source: UEFA

11 September 1996 1	IFK Göteborg (Sweden)	2–3	(Norway) Rosenborg	Gothenburg, Sweden
20:30	Erlingmark 38', 49'	Report	Jakobsen 32'; Iversen 52'; Brattbakk 64'	Stadium: Ullevi; Attendance: 23,682; Referee: Atanas Uzunov (Bulgaria)

25 September 1996 2	Rosenborg (Norway)	1–4	(Italy) Milan	Trondheim, Norway
20:30	Soltvedt 15'	Report	Simone 6', 21', 24'; Weah 55'	Stadium: Lerkendal Stadion; Attendance: 20,849; Referee: David Elleray (England)

16 October 1996 3	Rosenborg (Norway)	0–1	(Portugal) Porto	Trondheim, Norway
20:30		Report	Jardel 90'	Stadium: Lerkendal Stadion; Attendance: 20,412; Referee: Charles Agius (Malta)

30 October 1996 4	Porto (Portugal)	3–0	(Norway) Rosenborg	Porto, Portugal
19:30	Zahovič 32'; Drulović 41'; Artur 60'	Report		Stadium: Estádio das Antas; Attendance: 20,000; Referee: Bernd Heynemann (Germany)

20 November 1996 5	Rosenborg (Norway)	1–0	(Sweden) IFK Göteborg	Trondheim, Norway
20:30	Skammelsrud 66'	Report		Stadium: Lerkendal Stadion; Attendance: 19,849; Referee: Eric Blareau (Belgium)

4 December 1996 6	Milan (Italy)	1–2	(Norway) Rosenborg	Milan, Italy
20:30	Dugarry 45'	Report	Brattbakk 29'; Heggem 70'	Stadium: San Siro; Attendance: 28,965; Referee: Giorgos Bikas (Greece)

==== Knockout phase ====
5 March 1997 Quarter-finals 1st leg	Rosenborg (Norway)	1–1	(Italy) Juventus	Trondheim, Norway
20:30	Soltvedt 51'	Report	Vieri 53'	Stadium: Lerkendal Stadion; Attendance: 20,246; Referee: Marc Batta (France)

19 March 1997 Quarter-finals 2nd leg	Juventus (Italy)	2–0 (3–1 agg.)	(Norway) Rosenborg	Turin, Italy
20:30	Zidane 29'; Amoruso 89' (pen.)	Report		Stadium: Stadio delle Alpi; Attendance: 35,371; Referee: Vítor Melo Pereira (Portugal)
