= David Hanssen =

Norwegian footballer (born 1976)

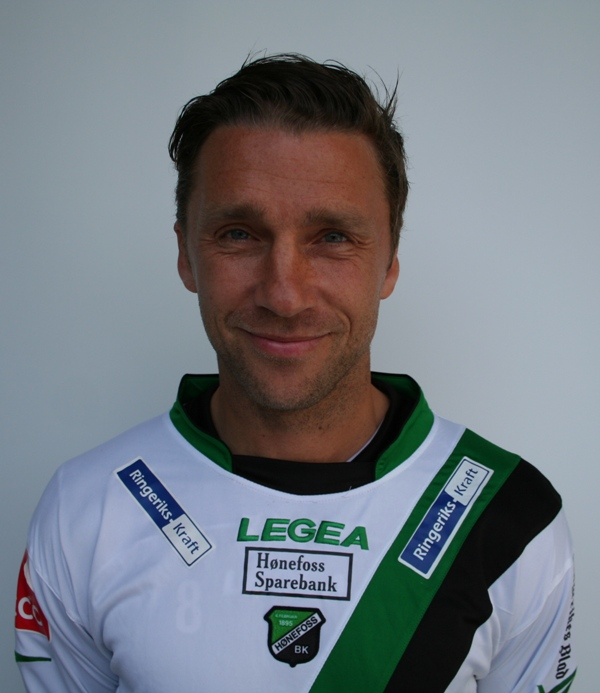
- David Hanssen while playing for Hønefoss

Personal information
- Full name: David Antonius Hanssen
- Date of birth: 13 November 1976 (age 49)
- Place of birth: Tromsø, Norway
- Height: 1.82 m (5 ft 11 1/2 in)
- Position: Midfielder

Team information
- Current team: Lommedalen (player-manager)

Senior career*
Years	Team	Apps	(Gls)
1997–2001	Stabæk	44	(3)
2001	Strømsgodset	19	(2)
2002–2004	Vålerenga	63	(12)
2005–2006	Start	7	(0)
2007–2011	Hønefoss	110	(21)
2012	Stabæk	17	(0)

Managerial career
- 2013–: Lommedalen
- * Club domestic league appearances and goals

David Antonius Hanssen (born 13 November 1976) is a Norwegian former professional footballer who played as a midfielder. He is currently player-manager at Lommedalen. Hanssen has previously played for Lillehammer FK, Faaberg, Stabæk, Strømsgodset, Vålerenga, Start, Hønefoss and Stabæk for a second time.

== Early life ==
He grew up in Reinøya near Tromsø, then moved to Follebu at the age of nine and Lillehammer three years later. His parents were Pentecostals.

== Club career ==
David Hanssen played at Stabæk for 4 seasons. He was later purchased by Strømsgodset, later by Vålerenga ahead of the 2002 season. He had a good spell, but injuries to his knee put his career at Vålerenga on hold. After one season in Start, he played five season for Hønefoss.

In 2012, Hanssen returned to his former club Stabæk. He made his re-debut for Stabæk on the opening day of the Norwegian Premier League season against Aalesund on 24 March 2012.

After the season, Hanssen decided to step down from professional football and joined the Third Division Lommedalen as player-manager, with Marcus Bakke as playing assistant.
