= Nils Skutle =

Norwegian football executive

Nils Skutle (born August 16, 1953, in Odda Municipality) was the director of the Norwegian football club Rosenborg BK. He was also a member of the Norwegian interest organization Norsk Toppfotball until 2009.
