= 2003 Norwegian Football Cup =

Norgesmesterskapet i fotball for herrer

Tournament details
- Country: Norway
- Teams: 128 (main competition)

Final positions
- Champions: Rosenborg (9th title)
- Runners-up: Bodø/Glimt

Tournament statistics
- Matches played: 127
- Goals scored: 551 (4.34 per match)
- Top goal scorer: Frode Johnsen (11)

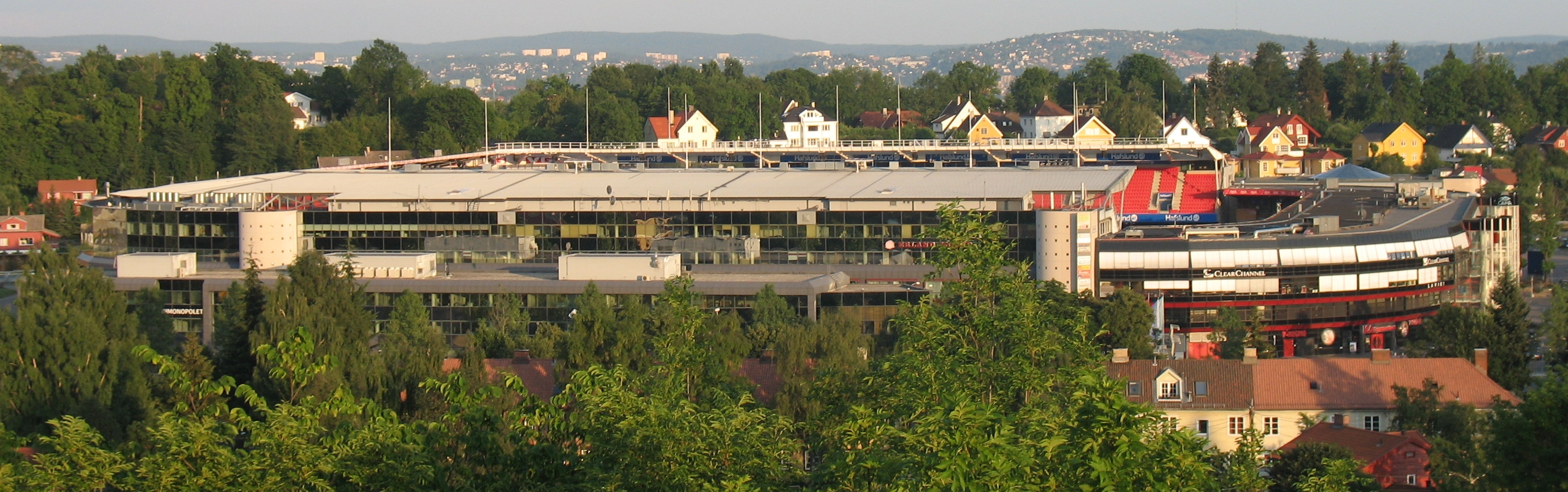
Ullevaal Stadion, Oslo - venue for the Norwegian Cup final

The 2003 Norwegian Football Cup was the 98th edition of the Norwegian Football Cup. Rosenborg won their 9th Norwegian Championship title after defeating Bodø/Glimt in the final with the score 3–1. The final was played on Sunday 9 November at Ullevaal stadion in Oslo.

Bodø/Glimt reached the final after beating Verdal, Mo, Tromsdalen, Ørn-Horten, Aalesund and Tromsø.

Rosenborg reached the final after beating Buvik, Clausenengen, Lofoten, Lyn, Haugesund and Skeid.

== Calendar ==
Below are the dates for each round as given by the official schedule:

Round	Date(s)	Number of fixtures	Clubs
First Round	6–7 May 2003	64	128 → 64
Second Round	21 May 2003	32	64 → 32
Third Round	25–26 June 2003	16	32 → 16
Fourth Round	6–7 August 2003	8	16 → 8
Quarter-finals	27 August 2003	4	8 → 4
Semi-finals	14 October 2003	2	4 → 2
Final	9 November 2003	1	2 → 1

== First round ==
Team 1	Score	Team 2
6 May 2003
Sprint/Jeløy	4–2	Fossum
Drøbak/Frogn	1–4	Borg
Ulf-Sandnes	0–4	Ålgård
Jotun	1–3	Hønefoss
7 May 2003
Kvik Halden	8–1	Grüner
Sparta Sarpsborg	4–2	Oslo Øst
Fredrikstad	8–1	Runar
Rakkestad	0–4	Stabæk
Moss	2–0	Tollnes
Frigg	2–0	Lørenskog
Mercantile	8–1	Åssiden
Groruddalen	0–8	HamKam
Bærum	2–0	Østsiden
Asker	0–4	Gjøvik/Lyn
Fjellhammar	0–6	Raufoss
Eidsvold Turn	0–1 (a.e.t.)	FK Tønsberg
Skjetten	2–1	Follo
Kongsvinger	3–1	Ringsaker
Nybergsund	3–0	Elverum
Lillehammer	2–1	Kjelsås
Brumunddal	0–6	Sogndal
Hamar	0–6	Molde
Kolbu/KK	0–7	Lyn
Birkebeineren	1–2	Ull/Kisa
Notodden	2–8	Sandefjord
Borre	2–3	Skeid
Ørn-Horten	1–0	Larvik Fotball
Eik-Tønsberg	1–4	Strømsgodset
Pors Grenland	5–1	Fagerborg
Skotfoss	1–5	Vålerenga
Arendal	1–2	Odd
Donn	1–1 (2–4 p)	Jerv
Flekkerøy	1–2	Start
Mandalskameratene	7–1	Randaberg
Egersund	2–3	Bryne
Klepp	4–0	Vardeneset
Vard Haugesund	2–1 (a.e.t.)	Vidar
Kopervik	1–5	Viking
Nest Sotra	2–1	Fana
Åsane	2–3	Hovding
Sandviken	0–3	Løv-Ham
Fyllingen	1–1 (5–4 p)	Varegg
Lyngbø	0–4	Brann
Hødd	7–0	Førde
Langevåg	0–1	Stryn
Skarbøvik	3–0	Volda
Haramsøy/Nordøy	0–2	Aalesund
Træff	0–5	Averøykameratene
Clausenengen	2–0	Sunndal
Buvik	0–17	Rosenborg
Strindheim	5–1	Nidelv
Ranheim	0–2	Byåsen
Kolstad	0–3	Levanger
Verdal	3–5	Bodø/Glimt
Steinkjer	4–1	Beitstad
Mo	1–0	Stålkameratene
Narvik	3–2	Skarp
Vesterålen	1–3	Lofoten
Tromsdalen	3–0	Skjervøy
Senja	1–9	Tromsø
Hammerfest	6–1	Bossekop
Alta	3–1	Harstad
Kirkenes	0–7	Lillestrøm
Trott	0–6	Haugesund

== Second round ==
Team 1	Score	Team 2
13 May 2003
Alta	2–2 (2–4 p)	Tromsdalen
Averøykameratene	0–3	Molde
Frigg	0–5	Vålerenga
Haugesund	1–0	Hovding
Rosenborg	15–0	Clausenengen
Start	4–2	Klepp
Strømsgodset	7–1	Bærum
Ålgård	0–1	Viking
19 May 2003
FK Tønsberg	0–2	Odd Grenland
21 May 2003
Bodø/Glimt	2–1	Mo
Borg	1–2	Fredrikstad
Bryne	5–1	Vard Haugesund
Byåsen	3–2 (a.e.t.)	Strindheim
Fyllingen	1–3	Brann
Gjøvik/Lyn	2–4 (a.e.t.)	Raufoss
HamKam	2–1	Skjetten
Hønefoss	0–0 (4–3 p)	Nybergsund
Jerv	0–1	Mandalskameratene
Kongsvinger	1–1 (1–3 p)	Ørn-Horten
Levanger	2–1	Steinkjer
Lillestrøm	7–2	Mercantile
Lofoten	6–0	Narvik
Løv-Ham	2–3	Nest-Sotra
Sandefjord	2–2 (5–3 p)	Pors Grenland
Skarbøvik	0–1	Hødd
Skeid	1–0 (a.e.t.)	Kvik Halden
Sogndal	10–0	Lillehammer
Sprint/Jeløy	0–4	Moss
Stryn	0–4	Aalesund
Tromsø	8–1	Hammerfest
22 May 2003
Stabæk	2–0	Sparta Sarpsborg
4 June 2003
Lyn	4–1	Ull/Kisa

== Third round ==
Team 1	Score	Team 2
25 June 2003
Fredrikstad	1–2	Lillestrøm
Moss	1–2	Stabæk
Vålerenga	2–1	Sandefjord
HamKam	2–3	Lyn
Raufoss	2–2 (4–1 p)	Hønefoss
Odd Grenland	1–2	Ørn-Horten
Mandalskameratene	3–0	Start
Viking	3–0	Nest-Sotra
Sogndal	1–0	Byåsen
Aalesund	4–2	Hødd
Molde	0–1	Skeid
Levanger	0–3	Tromsø
Lofoten	1–6	Rosenborg
Tromsdalen	1–2	Bodø/Glimt
26 June 2003
Haugesund	3–2	Bryne
Brann	4–3	Strømsgodset

== Fourth round ==
23 July 2003
19:00 CEST (UTC+2)

Rosenborg	5–0	Lyn
F. Johnsen 8', 62'; Strand 53'; Storflor 68'; Brattbakk 81'	Report

Lerkendal Stadion, Trondheim
Attendance: 7,531
Referee: Tommy Skjerven

6 August 2003
18:00 CEST (UTC+2)

Raufoss	6–1	Mandalskameratene
C. Johnsen 9'; Bjørkøy 16'; Moen 25', 82'; Ingolfsson 27' (pen.); Storbæk 47'	Report	Hagen 75'

Raufoss Stadion, Raufoss
Attendance: 1,352
Referee: Stig Rune Krokdal

6 August 2003
18:00 CEST (UTC+2)

Skeid	2–2 (a.e.t.)	Sogndal
Theting 38' (pen.); Braaten 98'	Report	Flo 3'; Ødegaard 102'
Penalties
Theting (penalty scored); Johannessen (penalty scored); Jacobsen (penalty missed); Grina (penalty scored); Noppi (penalty scored)	4–3	(penalty scored) Stadheim; (penalty missed) Flo; (penalty scored) Bolseth; (penalty missed) Heggestad; (penalty scored) Johansen

Voldsløkka Stadion, Oslo
Attendance: 1,470
Referee: Per Ivar Staberg

6 August 2003
18:00 CEST (UTC+2)

Ørn-Horten	1–3	Bodø/Glimt
Idris 64'	Report	Berg 29'; Bjørkan 31'; Johansen 61'

Lystlunden, Horten
Attendance: 1,691
Referee: Brage Sandmoen

6 August 2003
18:00 CEST (UTC+2)

Viking	1–2	Haugesund
Sanne 14'	Report	Wiken 27'; Grindheim 75'

Stavanger Stadion, Stavanger
Attendance: 3,510
Referee: Tom Henning Øvrebø

6 August 2003
18:20 CEST (UTC+2)

Lillestrøm	1–1 (a.e.t.)	Vålerenga
Strand 12'	Report	Grahn 56'
Penalties
Sundgot (penalty scored); Belsvik (penalty scored); Kippe (penalty scored); Søgård (penalty scored); Bjarmann (penalty scored); Winsnes (penalty scored); Kristoffersen (penalty scored); Berget (penalty scored); Andresen (penalty scored); Misund (penalty scored); Sundgot (penalty missed)	10–11	(penalty scored) K. Rekdal; (penalty scored) Hanssen; (penalty scored) Bolthof; (penalty scored) Kah; (penalty scored) Grahn; (penalty scored) Hovi; (penalty scored) dos Santos; (penalty scored) Gashi; (penalty scored) Ohr; (penalty scored) Holm; (penalty scored) K. Rekdal

Åråsen Stadion, Lillestrøm
Attendance: 9,941
Referee: Terje Hauge

7 August 2003
18:00 CEST (UTC+2)

Stabæk	2–4	Aalesund
Stenersen 36'; Andresen 81'	Report	Moldskred 22', 45', 89'; Aarøy 72'

Nadderud Stadion, Bærum
Attendance: 1,688
Referee: Roy Helge Olsen

7 August 2003
19:05 CEST (UTC+2)

Tromsø	1–0	Brann
M. G. Pedersen 60'	Report

Alfheim Stadion, Tromsø
Attendance: 1,628
Referee: Kjell Alseth

== Quarter-finals ==
27 August 2003
18:00 CEST (UTC+2)

Bodø/Glimt	3–0	Aalesund
Hanssen 24'; C. Berg 42'; R. Berg 85' (pen.)	Report

Aspmyra Stadion, Bodø
Attendance: 4,853
Referee: Terje Hauge

27 August 2003
18:00 CEST (UTC+2)

Tromsø	2–0	Raufoss
Kovacs 5'; Årst 25'	Report

Alfheim Stadion, Tromsø
Attendance: 2,443
Referee: Rune Pedersen

27 August 2003
18:00 CEST (UTC+2)

Vålerenga	1–3	Skeid
Hanssen 90'	Report	Grina 29'; Breive 63'; Braaten 84'

Ullevaal Stadion, Oslo
Attendance: 8,798
Referee: Roy Helge Olsen

17 September 2003
16:30 CEST (UTC+2)

Haugesund	2–3	Rosenborg
Rødahl 49'; Wiken 63'	Report	Karadas 10'; F. Johnsen 21'; Storflor 37'

Haugesund Stadion, Haugesund
Attendance: 8,057
Referee: Brage Sandmoen

== Semi-finals ==
2 October 2003
19:00 CEST (UTC+2)

Rosenborg	2–1	Skeid
Strand 32'; Brattbakk 36'	Report	Noppi 77'

Lerkendal Stadion, Trondheim
Attendance: 8,372
Referee: Tommy Skjerven

14 October 2003
19:00 CEST (UTC+2)

Tromsø	0–3	Bodø/Glimt
	Report	Hanssen 32'; Råstad 77'; Brekke 90'

Alfheim Stadion, Tromsø
Attendance: 8,478
Referee: Tom Henning Øvrebø

== Final ==
9 November 2003
13:15 CET (UTC+1)

Bodø/Glimt	1–3 (a.e.t.)	Rosenborg
Johansen 28'	Report	F. Johnsen 35'; Solli 105', 120'

Ullevaal Stadion, Oslo
Attendance: 25,447
Referee: Terje Hauge (Olsvik)
