= Christer George =

Norwegian footballer (born 1979)

Personal information
- Date of birth: 11 August 1979 (age 47)
- Place of birth: Oslo, Norway
- Height: 1.78 m (5 ft 10 in)
- Position: Midfielder

Youth career
- Grei
- Skeid

Senior career*
Years	Team	Apps	(Gls)
1997	Skeid	10	(0)
1998–2000	Strømsgodset	67	(22)
2000–2004	Rosenborg	78	(28)
2004	Córdoba	29	(1)
2005	AGF	41	(10)
2006–2010	Strømsgodset	59	(14)
2010	Fredericia	2	(0)
Total		286	(75)

International career
2003	Norway	2	(0)
- * Club domestic league appearances and goals

Christer George (born 11 August 1979) is a Norwegian former football player. His twin brother Michael plays handball on professional level.
