= Christian Berg =

Norwegian footballer (born 1978)

Personal information
- Date of birth: May 17, 1978 (age 48)
- Place of birth: Bodø, Norway
- Height: 1.77 m (5 ft 10 in)
- Position: Midfielder

Senior career*
Years	Team	Apps	(Gls)
1996–2005	Bodø/Glimt	144	(11)
2006–2007	Fredrikstad	18	(0)
2008–2013	Bodø/Glimt	138	(5)
2014–2015	Fredrikstad	24	(0)
- * Club domestic league appearances and goals as of 21 April 2014

Christian Berg (born 17 May 1978) is a retired Norwegian football midfielder. He was the captain of Bodø/Glimt, where he started his professional career in 1996. He has made over 200 appearances for the club.

He is not related to the three brothers Ørjan, Runar and Arild Berg, who have also played for Bodø/Glimt.

== Career statistics ==
As of 16 August 2014

Season	Club	Division	League		Cup		Total	
Season	Club	Division	Apps	Goals	Apps	Goals	Apps	Goals
1997	Bodø/Glimt	Tippeligaen	5	1	0	0	5	1
1998	Bodø/Glimt	Tippeligaen	20	0	0	0	20	0
1999	Bodø/Glimt	Tippeligaen	16	1	3	3	19	4
2000	Bodø/Glimt	Tippeligaen	5	0	1	1	6	1
2001	Bodø/Glimt	Tippeligaen	16	4	2	0	18	4
2002	Bodø/Glimt	Tippeligaen	17	2	4	0	21	2
2003	Bodø/Glimt	Tippeligaen	23	3	6	3	29	6
2004	Bodø/Glimt	Tippeligaen	17	0	1	0	19	0
2005	Bodø/Glimt	Tippeligaen	25	0	4	1	29	1
2006	Fredrikstad	Tippeligaen	14	0	4	0	18	0
2007	Fredrikstad	Tippeligaen	4	0	0	0	4	0
2008	Bodø/Glimt	Tippeligaen	24	1	2	0	26	1
2009	Bodø/Glimt	Tippeligaen	26	0	1	0	27	0
2010	Bodø/Glimt	Adeccoligaen	19	0	0	0	19	0
2011	Bodø/Glimt	Adeccoligaen	19	1	0	0	19	1
2012	Bodø/Glimt	Adeccoligaen	22	3	2	0	24	3
2013	Bodø/Glimt	Adeccoligaen	28	0	2	0	30	0
2014	Fredrikstad	1. divisjon	24	0	0	0	24	0
2015	Fredrikstad	OBOS-ligaen	0	0	0	0	0	0
Career Total			324	16	32	8	356	24

== Honours ==
=== Club ===
Fredrikstad

- Norwegian Football Cup (1): 2006
