= Erik Noppi =

Norwegian footballer (born 1970)

Personal information
- Date of birth: 5 March 1970 (age 56)
- Position: Defender

Senior career*
Years	Team	Apps	(Gls)
- Fremad
- Grue
- Nybergsund
1996–1997	Kongsvinger	39	(10)
1998–2003	Skeid		
- * Club domestic league appearances and goals

Erik Noppi (born 5 March 1970) is a retired Norwegian footballer.

In his early career he played for Fremad, Grue IL and Nybergsund IL. He joined Kongsvinger IL in 1996, and played 39 Norwegian Premier League games over two years. He then joined Skeid Fotball, playing there from 1998 to 2003. After retiring, he found work as a school teacher in Sagene.

In the winter of 1997 he went on trial with Aberdeen F.C., playing a reserve team match.
