= Fredrik Winsnes =

Norwegian footballer (born 1975)

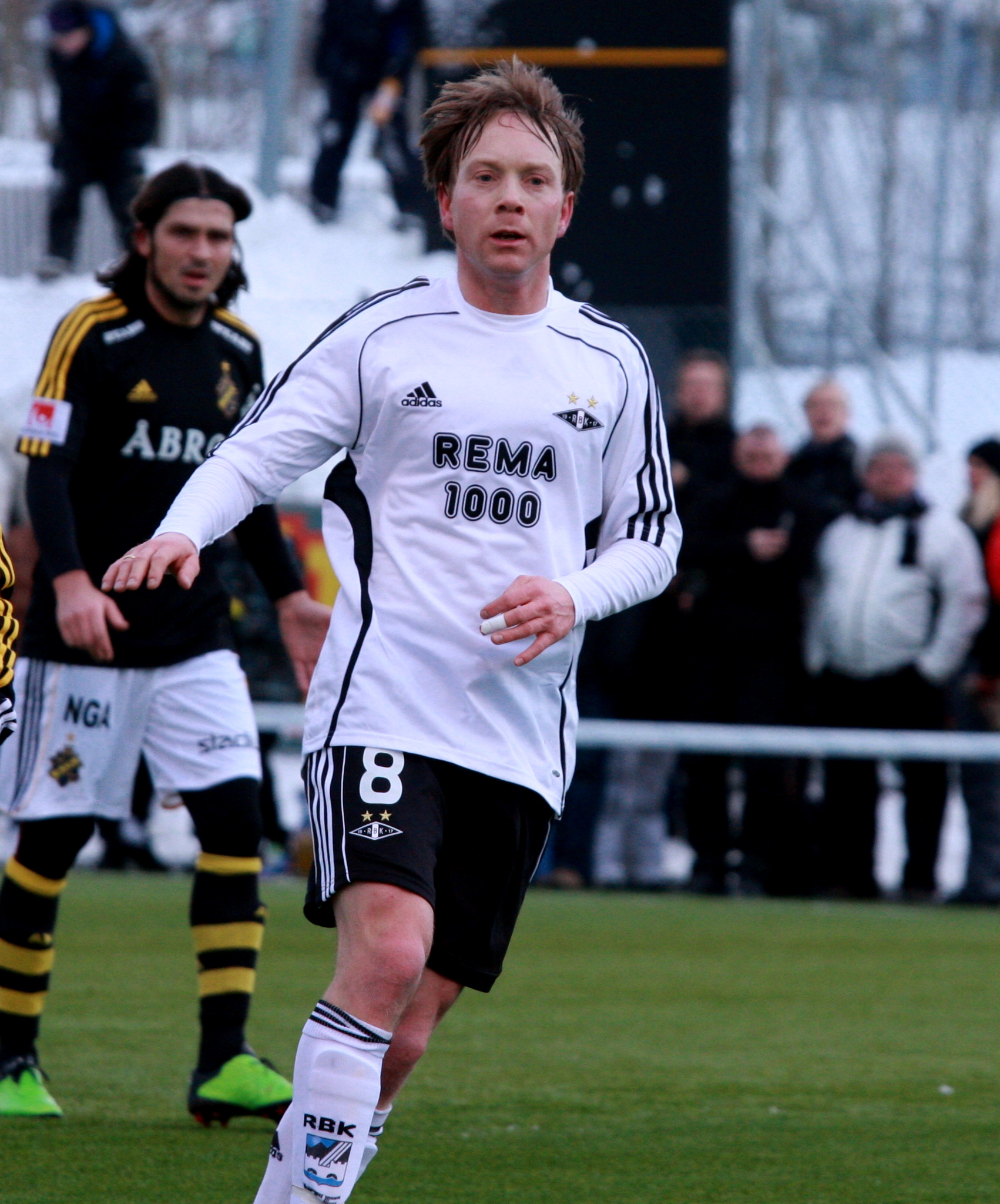
- Photo:Jarle Vines

Personal information
- Full name: Fredrik Guttormsen Lærum Winsnes
- Date of birth: 28 December 1975 (age 50)
- Place of birth: Trondheim, Norway
- Height: 1.73 m (5 ft 8 in)
- Position: Midfielder

Youth career
- Ranheim

Senior career*
Years	Team	Apps	(Gls)
1996–2005	Rosenborg	173	(14)
2002	→ Hammarby (loan)	25	(2)
2006–2007	AaB	45	(4)
2007–2009	Strømsgodset	67	(7)
2010–2011	Rosenborg	43	(1)
Total		353	(28)

International career
2001–2009	Norway	19	(0)
- * Club domestic league appearances and goals

Fredrik Guttormsen Lærum Winsnes (born 28 December 1975) is a Norwegian former professional footballer who played as a midfielder, primarily for Rosenborg BK in the Norwegian Premier League. He also played 19 games for the Norway national football team.

== Career ==
Born in Trondheim, Winsnes started his senior career with local team Rosenborg in 1996. He played nine seasons at Rosenborg, winning seven Norwegian Premier League championships and two Norwegian Cups. Though playing for Rosenborg until the end of 2005, he spent the 2002 season on loan at Swedish team Hammarby IF. In December 2005, he signed a three-year long deal with Aalborg Boldspilklub (AaB) in the Danish Superliga. He joined the AaB squad on 4 January 2006 during the training for the second half of the 2005–06 Superliga season.

He played one and a half season at AaB, helping them win bronze medals in the 2006–07 Superliga season; the best AaB result in eight years. After the season, he was named 2006-07 AaB Player of the Year. Having played a total 57 games and scored five goals for AaB, the birth of his daughter prompted Winsnes and his wife to move back to Norway to be closer to their family. He continued his career at Strømsgodset. August 20, 2008 he made a comeback on the Norwegian national team in a friendly match against Ireland, almost five years since his last match for Norway. After the 2009 season Winsnes returned to Rosenborg in his hometown Trondheim.

== Career statistics ==
Season	Club	Division	League		Cup		Total	
Season	Club	Division	Apps	Goals	Apps	Goals	Apps	Goals
2005–06	AaB	Superliga	13	1	0	0	13	1
2006–07	AaB	Superliga	32	3	0	0	32	3
2007	Strømsgodset	Tippeligaen	14	1	2	0	16	1
2008	Strømsgodset	Tippeligaen	25	3	5	2	30	5
2009	Strømsgodset	Tippeligaen	28	3	1	0	29	3
2010	Rosenborg	Tippeligaen	26	1	5	0	31	1
2011	Rosenborg	Tippeligaen	17	0	4	2	21	2
Career Total			155	12	17	4	172	16

== Honours ==
=== Club ===
Rosenborg

- Norwegian Premier League Champion (8): 1997, 1998, 1999, 2000, 2001, 2003, 2004, 2010
- Norwegian Cup Win (2): 1999, 2003

=== Individual ===
- AaB Player of the Year: 2006–07
