= Christer Basma =

Norwegian footballer (born 1972)

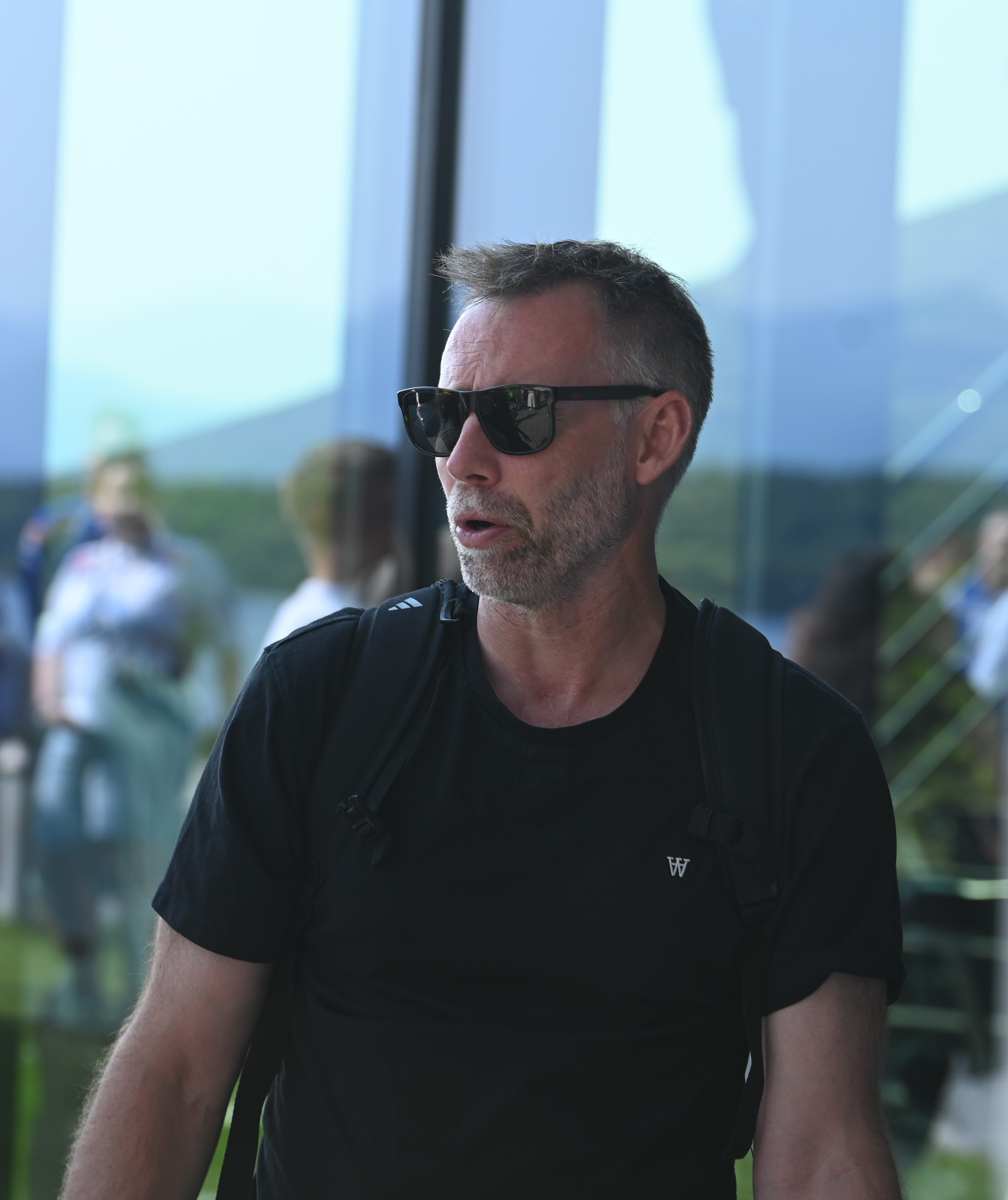

Personal information
- Full name: Ole Christer Basma
- Date of birth: 1 August 1972 (age 54)
- Place of birth: Norway
- Height: 1.89 m (6 ft 2 in)
- Position: Defender

Youth career
- –1990: Røyken og Spikkestad

Senior career*
| Years | Team | Apps | (Gls) |
| 1990–1992 | Bærum | | |
| 1993–1994 | Kongsvinger | 39 | (2) |
| 1995–1998 | Stabæk | 86 | (1) |
| 1998–2008 | Rosenborg | 225 | (5) |
| 2010 | Ranheim | 2 | (0) |

International career
| 1993 | Norway U-21 | 5 | (1) |
| 1995–2005 | Norway | 40 | (0) |
- * Club domestic league appearances and goals

Christer Basma (born 1 August 1972) is a Norwegian former footballer who played as a defender. He played 16 consecutive seasons Tippeligaen, for Kongsvinger, Stabæk and Rosenborg. With 350 top division appearances, Basma has made the eighth-highest number of appearances in Eliteserien. Basma was capped 40 times for Norway. He has later worked as assistant coach of Ranheim.

== Club career ==
Basma started his career with little Røyken og Spikkestad and then played for Bærum but his breakthrough came at Kongsvinger. He moved on to Stabæk, before he finally went to Rosenborg in 1998. With the Trondheim club he won Tippeligaen eight times and he featured in 40 Champions League games. His last game for Rosenborg BK on 27 January 2008 in the 4-0 loss against Valencia in the 2007–08 UEFA Cup, before his retired in January 2009.

After 16 consecutive season in Tippeligaen and 350 matches, Basma is the player with the fourth most matches in the Norwegian top-flight, only surpassed by Roar Strand, Daniel Berg Hestad and Morten Berre.

In 2010, while coaching Ranheim, he appeared on the field as defender, first in the Norwegian Cup against Kristiansund BK, and also in the First Division against Mjøndalen and Sandnes Ulf.

Basma played for the amateur side Mosvik IL in the 6. Divisjon in 2013, where he was teammate with the cross-country skier Petter Northug.

== International career ==
Basma made his debut for Norway in a November 1995 friendly match against Trinidad and Tobago and earned a total of 40 caps, scoring no goals. His last international match was a January 2005 friendly match against Bahrain.

== Coaching career ==
During the 2010 season he was assistant coach of Ranheim in the First Division, in a coaching team including Per Joar Hansen and Otto Ulseth.

== Honours ==
Rosenborg

- Norwegian top division: 1998, 1999, 2000, 2001, 2002, 2003, 2004, 2006
- Norwegian Cup: 1999, 2003
