= Ståle Stensaas =

Norwegian footballer and coach (born 1971)

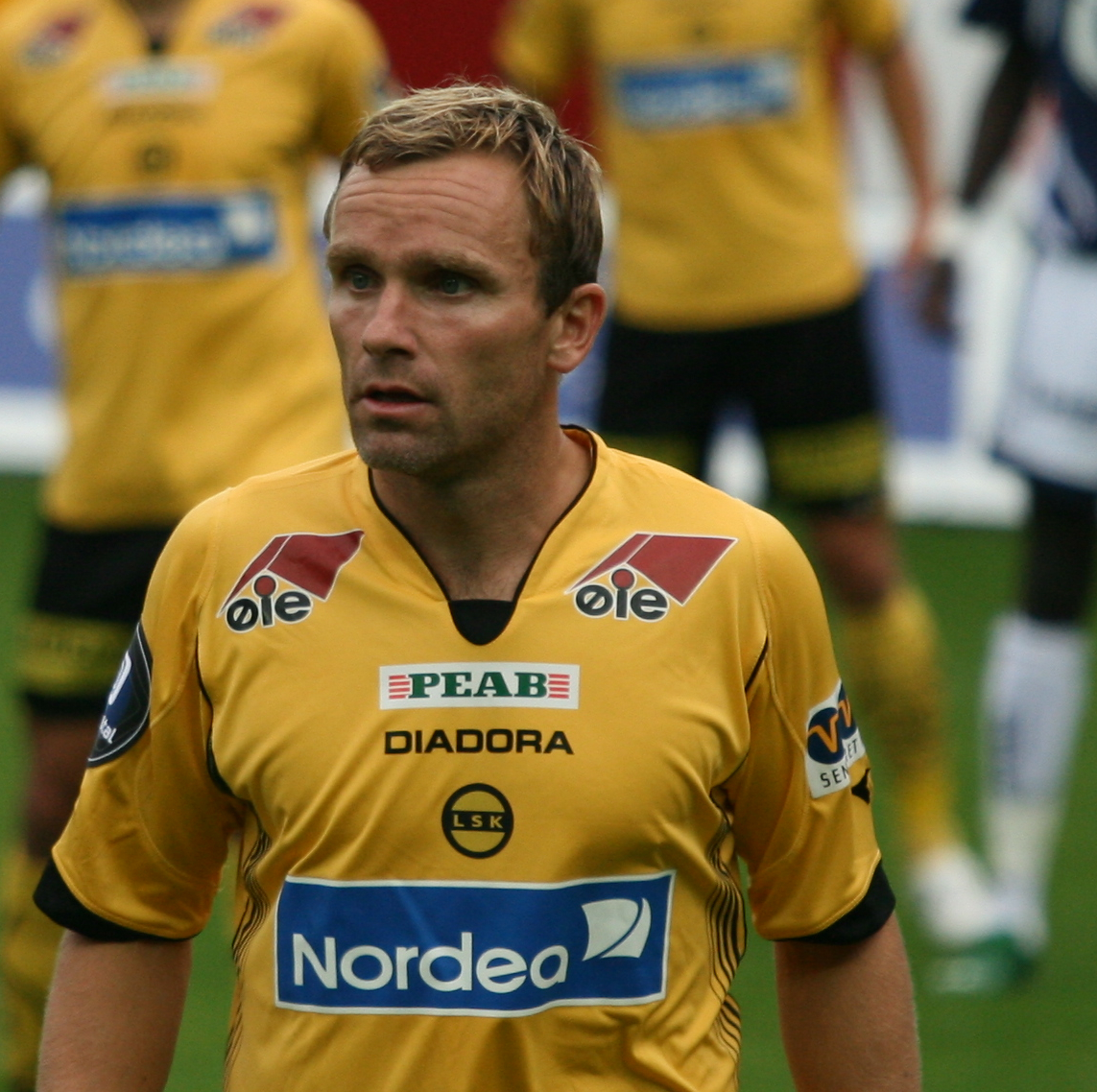

Personal information
- Full name: Ståle Stensaas
- Date of birth: 7 July 1971 (age 55)
- Place of birth: Trondheim, Norway
- Height: 1.79 m (5 ft 10 1/2 in)
- Position: Defender

Senior career*
Years	Team	Apps	(Gls)
1991–1997	Rosenborg	85	(2)
1997–2000	Rangers	20	(1)
1999	→ Nottingham Forest (loan)	7	(0)
2000–2007	Rosenborg	104	(12)
2007–2008	Lyn	24	(3)
2008	→ Lillestrøm (loan)	9	(1)

International career
2001–2008	Norway	9	(1)

Managerial career
- 2009: Rosenborg Junior Team
- * Club domestic league appearances and goals

Ståle Stensaas (born 7 July 1971) is a Norwegian football coach and former player. He spent the majority of his career at Rosenborg, and he is currently coaching Rosenborg's junior team.

== Career ==
Stensaas played for the Norwegian Tippeliga side Rosenborg from 1992 to 1997. One of the highlights of his career is his super goal against Blackburn Rovers in the UEFA Champions League in 1995. He was sold to Scottish club Rangers, where he scored goals against Kilmarnock in the league and Falkirk in the League Cup. He struggled to hold a place in the Rangers team and he returned to Rosenborg in 2000. Stensaas was sold to Lyn in the winter 2007, on a two-year contract. In the 2008 season he was on loan to Tippeligaen rivals Lillestrøm.

He has nine caps, and one goal.

After his career as professional football player ended in 2008, he started coaching Rosenborg's junior team. The team won the Norwegian junior championship in the 2009 season

== Personal life ==
Stensaas has three children: Andreas, Hanne and Sophie. He is a carpenter by profession, in addition to professional footballing.

== Honours ==
Rosenborg

- Norwegian Premier League Champion (8): 1994, 1995, 1996, 2000, 2001, 2002, 2003, 2004, 2006
- Norwegian Football Cup Win: 1995, 2003
