= Stig Johansen =

Norwegian footballer (born 1972)

Personal information
- Full name: Stig Johansen
- Date of birth: 13 June 1972 (age 54)
- Place of birth: Kabelvåg, Norway
- Height: 5 ft 10 in (1.78 m)
- Position: Striker

Youth career
- Kabelvåg

Senior career*
Years	Team	Apps	(Gls)
1995–1997	FK Bodø/Glimt	70	(45)
1997–1998	Southampton	6	(0)
1998	→ Bristol City (loan)	3	(0)
1998–2000	Helsingborgs IF	50	(9)
2001–2009	Bodø/Glimt	170	(45)
2011	Bodø/Glimt	5	(0)
2014	Kabelvåg	1	(0)
Total		305	(99)

International career
1997	Norway	3	(0)
- * Club domestic league appearances and goals as of 6 September 2014

Stig Johansen (born 13 June 1972) is a former Norwegian football striker.

He made his debut for Bodø/Glimt in 1993 and played 70 games before he was signed by English Premiership side Southampton, in 1997. His spell at the English side was spent mostly in the reserves and rarely played for the Saints. He also spent a period on loan at Bristol City, before being transferred to Swedish side Helsingborgs IF. In 2002, he returned to Bodø/Glimt. He has won three caps for Norway.

He announced his retirement in October 2009., but made a comeback in 2011 after being given a one-year contract with Bodø/Glimt.

On 31 August 2014 Johansen made comeback for his home club Kabelvåg, he just played one game to finish his career for good. He also open the new pitch for Kabelvåg.

== Career statistics ==
Season	Club	Division	League		Cup		Total	
Season	Club	Division	Apps	Goals	Apps	Goals	Apps	Goals
1995	Bodø/Glimt	Tippeligaen	26	19	0	0	26	19
1996	Bodø/Glimt	Tippeligaen	26	14	0	0	26	14
1997	Bodø/Glimt	Tippeligaen	18	12	0	0	18	12
1997–98	Southampton	Premier League	6	0	0	0	6	0
1997–98	Bristol City	Second Division	3	0	0	0	3	0
1998	Helsingborg	Allsvenskan	9	2	0	0	9	2
1999	Helsingborg	Allsvenskan	22	3	0	0	22	3
2000	Helsingborg	Allsvenskan	19	4	0	0	19	4
2001	Bodø/Glimt	Tippeligaen	18	4	3	2	21	6
2002	Bodø/Glimt	Tippeligaen	23	5	2	6	25	11
2003	Bodø/Glimt	Tippeligaen	22	7	4	2	26	9
2004	Bodø/Glimt	Tippeligaen	20	6	3	8	23	14
2005	Bodø/Glimt	Tippeligaen	16	5	1	0	17	5
2006	Bodø/Glimt	Adeccoligaen	17	5	1	2	18	7
2007	Bodø/Glimt	Adeccoligaen	11	0	1	1	12	1
2008	Bodø/Glimt	Tippeligaen	19	5	4	3	23	8
2009	Bodø/Glimt	Tippeligaen	24	8	2	0	26	8
2011	Bodø/Glimt	Adeccoligaen	5	0	0	0	5	0
2014	Kabelvåg	4. Divisjon	1	0	0	0	1	0
Career Total			305	99	21	24	326	123
