= Øyvind Storflor =

Norwegian footballer (born 1979)

- Storflor in 2005

Personal information
- Date of birth: 18 December 1979 (age 46)
- Place of birth: Trondheim, Norway
- Height: 1.80 m (5 ft 11 in)
- Positions: Midfielder; striker

Senior career*
Years	Team	Apps	(Gls)
1999–2001	Rosenborg	12	(1)
2000	→ Byåsen (loan)	11	(4)
2001–2002	Moss	50	(10)
2003–2008	Rosenborg	110	(20)
2009–2016	Strømsgodset	205	(33)
2017–2019	Ranheim	67	(4)
Total		455	(72)

International career
2005–2014	Norway	4	(0)
- * Club domestic league appearances and goals

Øyvind Storflor (born 18 December 1979) is a Norwegian former professional footballer. With 421 top division appearances, Storflor has made the fifth-highest number of appearances in Eliteserien.

== Club career ==
Storflor was born in Trondheim. He made his debut for Rosenborg BK in 1999. In 2000, he was loaned out for Byåsen, and in 2001 he was sold to Moss for 500,000 kr. In January 2003, Storflor returned to Rosenborg for NOK 1,000,000.

He came on a free transfer to Strømsgodset before the 2009 season. Winning the Norwegian Cup with the club in 2011 and Eliteserien in 2013, he stepped down to play for Ranheim in the 2017 season. However, the club achieved promotion from OBOS-ligaen through the play-offs the same year and has played in the top division since 2018. After the 2019 season Storflor decided to retire for football.

== International career ==
Storflor has four caps for the Norwegian national team. His first three caps all came in a pre-season tournament in January 2005. On 10 October 2014, he was subbed into the World Cup qualifying match versus Slovenia.

== Career statistics ==
As of 25 November 2019

Club	Season	Division	League		Cup		Europe		Total	
Club	Season	Division	Apps	Goals	Apps	Goals	Apps	Goals	Apps	Goals
Rosenborg	1999	Tippeligaen	4	0	0	0	0	0	4	0
Rosenborg	2000	Tippeligaen	8	1	0	0	1	0	9	1
Rosenborg	Total		12	1	0	0	1	0	13	1
Byåsen (loan)	2000	1. divisjon	11	4	0	0	0	0	11	4
Byåsen (loan)	Total		11	4	0	0	0	0	11	4
Moss	2001	Tippeligaen	25	2	3	2	0	0	28	5
Moss	2002	Tippeligaen	25	8	2	1	0	0	27	9
Moss	Total		50	10	5	3	0	0	55	13
Rosenborg	2003	Tippeligaen	16	8	5	3	6	1	27	12
Rosenborg	2004	Tippeligaen	24	2	3	2	9	1	36	5
Rosenborg	2005	Tippeligaen	20	5	4	6	10	1	34	12
Rosenborg	2006	Tippeligaen	24	3	5	3	0	0	29	6
Rosenborg	2007	Tippeligaen	14	1	4	1	6	0	24	2
Rosenborg	2008	Tippeligaen	12	1	2	0	2	0	16	1
Rosenborg	Total		110	20	23	15	33	3	166	38
Strømsgodset	2009	Tippeligaen	22	5	1	0	0	0	23	5
Strømsgodset	2010	Tippeligaen	24	4	6	0	0	0	30	4
Strømsgodset	2011	Tippeligaen	28	2	3	0	2	1	33	3
Strømsgodset	2012	Tippeligaen	27	4	5	3	0	0	32	7
Strømsgodset	2013	Tippeligaen	27	6	1	0	2	1	30	7
Strømsgodset	2014	Tippeligaen	26	4	3	1	2	0	31	5
Strømsgodset	2015	Tippeligaen	27	4	1	1	4	0	32	5
Strømsgodset	2016	Tippeligaen	24	4	3	1	1	0	28	5
Strømsgodset	Total		205	33	23	6	11	2	239	41
Ranheim	2017	OBOS-ligaen	23	0	1	0	0	0	24	0
Ranheim	2018	Eliteserien	23	3	1	0	0	0	24	3
Ranheim	2019	Eliteserien	21	1	4	0	0	0	24	1
Ranheim	Total		67	4	6	0	0	0	73	4
Career Total			455	72	57	24	45	5	558	101

== Honours ==
=== Club ===
Rosenborg

- Tippeligaen: 1999, 2000, 2003, 2004, 2006
- Norwegian Cup: 2003

Strømsgodset

- Tippeligaen: 2013
- Norwegian Cup: 2010

=== Individual ===
- Eliteserien Top assist provider: 2011, 2012, 2013
