= List of Eliteserien top scorers =

List of top goal scorers in the top flight of Norwegian football, currently known as Eliteserien. The statistics begin with the 1948–49 season. The League of Norway, played from 1937–38 to 1947–48, was divided in eleven conferences with different numbers of game weeks and is therefore not included in this statistics.

== Top scorers ==
=== By season ===
The following is a list of top scorers in the top football league of Norway by season.

†	Multiple top scorers in the season
*	Top scorer also won the league in the same season

Season	Player	Nat.	Club	Goals	Matches	G/M
1948–49	Arvid Havnås	Norway	Sandefjord	12	14	0.86
1949–50	Reidar Dørum	Norway	Ørn	13	14	0.93
1950–51	John Sveinsson	Norway	Lyn	19	14	1.36
1951–52	Jan Tangen	Norway	Strømmen	15	14	1.07
1952–53	Gunnar Thoresen†	Norway	Larvik Turn*	15	14	1.07
1952–53	Per Jacobsen†	Norway	Odd	15	14	1.07
1953–54	Gunnar Thoresen	Norway	Larvik Turn	15	14	1.07
1954–55	Harald Hennum	Norway	Skeid	13	14	0.93
1955–56	Willy Fossli	Norway	Asker	17	14	1.21
1956–57	Per Kristoffersen	Norway	Fredrikstad*	15	14	1.07
1957–58	Harald Hennum	Norway	Skeid	17	14	1.21
1958–59	Reidar Sundby	Norway	Larvik Turn	13	14	0.93
1959–60	Per Kristoffersen	Norway	Fredrikstad*	13	14	0.93
1960–61	Per Kristoffersen	Norway	Fredrikstad*	15	14	0.93
1961–62	Rolf Birger Pedersen	Norway	Brann*	26	30	0.87
1963	Leif Eriksen	Norway	Vålerenga	16	18	0.89
1964	Ole Stavrum	Norway	Lyn*	18	18	1.00
1965	Harald Berg	Norway	Lyn	19	18	1.06
1966	Per Kristoffersen	Norway	Fredrikstad	20	18	1.11
1967	Odd Iversen	Norway	Rosenborg	17	18	0.94
1968	Odd Iversen	Norway	Rosenborg	30	18	1.67
1969	Odd Iversen	Norway	Rosenborg*	26	18	1.44
1970	Steinar Pettersen	Norway	Strømsgodset*	16	18	0.89
1971	Jan Fuglset	Norway	Fredrikstad	17	18	0.94
1972	Egil Solberg†	Norway	Mjøndalen	16	22	0.73
1972	Johannes Vold†	Norway	Viking	16	22	0.73
1973	Stein Karlsen	Norway	HamKam	17	22	0.77
1974	Odd Berg	Norway	Molde	13	22	0.59
1975	Arne Dokken	Norway	Lillestrøm	18	22	0.82
1976	Jan Fuglset	Norway	Molde	17	22	0.77
1977	Trygve Johannessen	Norway	Viking	17	22	0.77
1978	Tom Lund	Norway	Lillestrøm	17	22	0.77
1979	Odd Iversen	Norway	Vålerenga	16	22	0.73
1980	Arne Dokken	Norway	Lillestrøm	14	22	0.64
1981	Pål Jacobsen	Norway	Vålerenga	16	22	0.73
1982	Tor Arne Granerud†	Norway	HamKam	11	22	0.50
1982	Trygve Johannessen†	Norway	Viking*	11	22	0.50
1983	Olav Nysæter	Norway	Kongsvinger	14	22	0.64
1984	Sverre Brandhaug	Norway	Rosenborg	13	22	0.77
1985	Jørn Andersen	Norway	Vålerenga	23	22	1.05
1986	Arve Seland	Norway	Start	12	22	0.55
1987	Jan Kristian Fjærestad	Norway	Moss*	18	22	0.82
1988	Jan Åge Fjørtoft	Norway	Lillestrøm	14	22	0.64
1989	Jahn Ivar Jakobsen	Norway	Rosenborg	18	22	0.82
1990	Tore André Dahlum	Norway	Start	20	22	0.91
1991	Karl Petter Løken	Norway	Rosenborg*	12	22	0.55
1992	Kjell Roar Kaasa	Norway	Kongsvinger	17	22	0.77
1993	Mons Ivar Mjelde	Norway	Lillestrøm	19	22	0.86
1994	Harald Martin Brattbakk	Norway	Rosenborg*	17	22	0.77
1995	Harald Martin Brattbakk	Norway	Rosenborg*	26	26	1.00
1996	Harald Martin Brattbakk	Norway	Rosenborg*	28	26	1.08
1997	Sigurd Rushfeldt	Norway	Rosenborg*	27	26	1.04
1998	Sigurd Rushfeldt	Norway	Rosenborg*	25	26	0.96
1999	Rune Lange	Norway	Tromsø	23	26	0.88
2000	Thorstein Helstad	Norway	Brann	18	24	0.75
2001	Frode Johnsen†	Norway	Rosenborg*	17	25	0.68
2001	Thorstein Helstad†	Norway	Brann	17	23	0.74
2001	Clayton Zane†	Australia	Lillestrøm	17	22	0.77
2002	Harald Martin Brattbakk	Norway	Rosenborg*	17	25	0.68
2003	Harald Martin Brattbakk	Norway	Rosenborg*	17	25	0.68
2004	Frode Johnsen	Norway	Rosenborg*	19	26	0.73
2005	Ole Martin Årst	Norway	Tromsø	16	26	0.62
2006	Daniel Nannskog	Sweden	Stabæk	19	26	0.73
2007	Thorstein Helstad	Norway	Brann*	22	24	0.92
2008	Daniel Nannskog	Sweden	Stabæk*	16	26	0.62
2009	Rade Prica	Sweden	Rosenborg*	17	28	0.61
2010	Baye Djiby Fall	Senegal	Molde	16	28	0.57
2011	Mustafa Abdellaoue	Norway	Tromsø	17	29	0.59
2012	Péter Kovács†	Hungary	Strømsgodset	14	28	0.50
2012	Zdeněk Ondrášek†	Czech Republic	Tromsø	14	29	0.48
2013	Frode Johnsen	Norway	Odd	16	30	0.53
2014	Viðar Örn Kjartansson	Iceland	Vålerenga	25	29	0.86
2015	Alexander Søderlund	Norway	Rosenborg*	22	27	0.81
2016	Christian Gytkjær	Denmark	Rosenborg*	19	28	0.68
2017	Nicklas Bendtner	Denmark	Rosenborg*	19	29	0.66
2018	Franck Boli	Ivory Coast	Stabæk	17	29	0.59
2019	Torgeir Børven	Norway	Odd	21	30	0.70
2020	Kasper Junker	Denmark	FK Bodø/Glimt*	27	25	1.08
2021	Ohi Omoijuanfo	Norway	Molde	27	29	0.93
2022	Amahl Pellegrino	Norway	Bodø/Glimt	25	27	0.93
2023	Amahl Pellegrino	Norway	Bodø/Glimt*	24	29	0.83
2024	Kristian Eriksen	Norway	Molde	14	28	0.50
2025	Daniel Karlsbakk	Norway	Sarpsborg 08	18	28	0.64

=== By player ===
Rank	Player	Country	Titles	Years
1	Harald Martin Brattbakk	Norway	5	1994, 1995, 1996, 2002, 2003
2	Per Kristoffersen	Norway	4	1956–57, 1959–60, 1960–61, 1966
2	Odd Iversen	Norway	4	1967, 1968, 1969, 1979
4	Thorstein Helstad	Norway	3	2000, 2001, 2007
4	Frode Johnsen	Norway	3	2001, 2004, 2013
6	Gunnar Thoresen	Norway	2	1952–53, 1953–54
6	Harald Hennum	Norway	2	1954–55, 1957–58
6	Jan Fuglset	Norway	2	1971, 1976
6	Arne Dokken	Norway	2	1975, 1980
6	Trygve Johannessen	Norway	2	1977, 1982
6	Sigurd Rushfeldt	Norway	2	1997, 1998
6	Daniel Nannskog	Sweden	2	2006, 2008
6	Amahl Pellegrino	Norway	2	2022, 2023
14	Arvid Havnås	Norway	1	1948–49
14	Reidar Dørum	Norway	1	1949–50
14	John Sveinsson	Norway	1	1950–51
14	Jan Tangen	Norway	1	1951–52
14	Per Jacobsen	Norway	1	1952–53
14	Willy Fossli	Norway	1	1955–56
14	Reidar Sundby	Norway	1	1958–59
14	Rolf Birger Pedersen	Norway	1	1961–62
14	Leif Eriksen	Norway	1	1963
14	Ole Stavrum	Norway	1	1964
14	Harald Berg	Norway	1	1965
14	Steinar Pettersen	Norway	1	1970
14	Egil Solberg	Norway	1	1972
14	Johannes Vold	Norway	1	1972
14	Stein Karlsen	Norway	1	1973
14	Odd Berg	Norway	1	1974
14	Tom Lund	Norway	1	1978
14	Pål Jacobsen	Norway	1	1981
14	Tor Arne Granerud	Norway	1	1982
14	Olav Nysæter	Norway	1	1983
14	Sverre Brandhaug	Norway	1	1984
14	Jørn Andersen	Norway	1	1985
14	Arve Seland	Norway	1	1986
14	Jan Kristian Fjærestad	Norway	1	1987
14	Jan Åge Fjørtoft	Norway	1	1988
14	Jahn Ivar Jakobsen	Norway	1	1989
14	Tore André Dahlum	Norway	1	1990
14	Karl Petter Løken	Norway	1	1991
14	Kjell Roar Kaasa	Norway	1	1992
14	Mons Ivar Mjelde	Norway	1	1993
14	Rune Lange	Norway	1	1999
14	Clayton Zane	Australia	1	2001
14	Ole Martin Årst	Norway	1	2005
14	Rade Prica	Sweden	1	2009
14	Baye Djiby Fall	Senegal	1	2010
14	Mustafa Abdellaoue	Norway	1	2011
14	Péter Kovács	Hungary	1	2012
14	Zdeněk Ondrášek	Czech Republic	1	2012
14	Viðar Örn Kjartansson	Iceland	1	2014
14	Alexander Søderlund	Norway	1	2015
14	Christian Gytkjær	Denmark	1	2016
14	Nicklas Bendtner	Denmark	1	2017
14	Franck Boli	Ivory Coast	1	2018
14	Torgeir Børven	Norway	1	2019
14	Kasper Junker	Denmark	1	2020
14	Ohi Omoijuanfo	Norway	1	2021
14	Kristian Eriksen	Norway	1	2024
14	Daniel Karlsbakk	Norway	1	2025

=== By club ===
	Club	Titles	Seasons
1	Rosenborg	19	1967, 1968, 1969, 1984, 1989, 1991, 1994, 1995, 1996, 1997, 1998, 2001, 2002, 2003, 2004, 2009, 2015, 2016, 2017
2	Lillestrøm	6	1975, 1978, 1980, 1988, 1993, 2001
3	Fredrikstad	5	1956–57, 1959–60, 1960–61, 1966, 1971
3	Vålerenga	5	1963, 1979, 1981, 1985, 2014
5	Brann	4	1961–62, 2000, 2001, 2007
5	Molde	4	1974, 1976, 2010, 2021
5	Tromsø	4	1999, 2005, 2011, 2012
8	Lyn	3	1950–51, 1964, 1965
8	Viking	3	1972, 1977, 1982
8	Stabæk	3	2006, 2008, 2018
8	Odd	3	1952–53, 2013, 2019
8	Bodø/Glimt	3	2020, 2022, 2023
13	Larvik Turn	2	1952–53, 1953–54
13	Skeid	2	1954–55, 1957–58
13	Start	2	1986, 1990
13	Kongsvinger	2	1983, 1992
13	Strømsgodset	2	1970, 2012
18	Sandefjord BK	1	1948–49
18	Ørn-Horten	1	1949–50
18	Strømmen	1	1951–52
18	Asker	1	1955–56
18	Mjøndalen	1	1972
18	HamKam	1	1982
18	Moss	1	1987
18	Sarpsborg 08	1	2025

=== By nationality ===
Country	Titles
Norway	69
Sweden	3
Denmark	3
Australia	1
Senegal	1
Hungary	1
Czech Republic	1
Iceland	1
Ivory Coast	1

== All-time topscorers with over 50 goals ==
The following is an all-time top-scorer list. Players who have scored 50 or more goals are included.

‡	Active player
**Bold**	Active player in 2024 Eliteserien

As of 28 May 2024

Rank	Player	Goals	Matches	Avg.	Seasons	Club(s)	
1	(Norway) Sigurd Rushfeldt	172	296	0.58	1992-2011	Tromsø, Rosenborg	
2	(Norway) Harald Brattbakk	166	255	0.65	1990-2005	Rosenborg, Bodø/Glimt	
3	(Norway) Petter Belsvik	159	292	0.54	1989-2003	Molde, HamKam, Start, Stabæk, Rosenborg, Vålerenga, Lillestrøm	
4	(Norway) Odd Iversen	158	225	0.70	1966-1982	Rosenborg, Vålerenga	
5	(Norway) Per Kristoffersen	146	194	0.75	1956-1968	Fredrikstad	
6	(Norway) Frode Johnsen	132	301	0.45	1999-2015	Odd, Rosenborg	
7	(Norway) Arne Pedersen	120	217	0.51	1951-1966	Fredrikstad	
8	(Norway) Thorstein Helstad	116	234	0.49	1995-2014	HamKam, Brann, Rosenborg, Lillestrøm	
8	(Norway) Bengt Sæternes	116	272	0.43	1996-2011	Viking, Bodø/Glimt, Brann, Vålerenga	
10	(Norway) Jostein Flo	112	213	0.53	1987-2001	Molde, Sogndal, Strømsgodset	
11	(Norway) Arild Sundgot	111	322	0.34	1995-2011	Hødd, Lillestrøm	
12	(Norway) Jan Fuglset	109	209	0.52	1967-1982	Fredrikstad, Molde	
13	(Norway) Svein Mathisen	106	327	0.32	1973-1989	IK Start	
14	(Norway) Ole Martin Årst	101	249	0.40	1995-2012	Tromsø, Start	
14	(Norway) Morten Berre	101	452	0.23	1996-2015	Skeid, Haugesund, Viking, Vålerenga	
16	(Norway) Mini Jakobsen	98	194	0.51	1988-2000	Rosenborg	
16	(Norway) Steffen Iversen	98	231	0.44	1995-2012	Rosenborg, Vålerenga	
18	(Norway) Henry Johannessen	96	139	0.69	1946-1961	Hødd, Fredrikstad	
19	(Norway) Espen Hoff	95	406	0.24	1999-2016	Odd, Lyn, Stabæk, Start	
20	(Norway) Harald Hennum	94	121	0.78	1949-1963	Frigg, Skeid	
20	(Norway) Amahl Pellegrino ‡	94	180	0.52	2014-2023	Lillestrøm, Mjøndalen, Strømsgodset, Kristiansund, Bodø/Glimt	
20	(Norway) **Thomas Lehne Olsen** ‡	94	221	0.42	2013-	Strømsgodset, Tromsø, Lillestrøm	
22	(Norway) Ohi Omoijuanfo ‡	92	250	0.36	2010-2021	Lillestrøm, Stabæk, Molde	
23	(Norway) Gunnar Thoresen	91	116	0.78	1947-1962	Larvik Turn	
24	(Norway) Willy Olsen	89	151	0.59	1949-1961	Fredrikstad	
24	(Norway) Tore André Dahlum	89	220	0.40	1989-1999	Start, Rosenborg	
24	(Norway) Gøran Sørloth	89	228	0.39	1984-1995	Strindheim, Rosenborg, Viking	
28	(Canada) Olivier Occéan	89	88	241	0.37	2004-2019	Odd, Lillestrøm, Mjøndalen
28	(Norway) Magne Hoseth	311	88	0.32	1999-2017	Molde, Vålerenga, Stabæk, Viking, Aalesund, Kristiansund	
30	(Norway) Alexander Søderlund	87	245	0.36	2011-2023	Haugesund, Rosenborg	
31	(Norway) Roar Strand	86	425	0.20	1990-2010	Rosenborg, Molde	
32	(Norway) Steinar Pettersen	85	153	0.56	1967-1975	Strømsgodset	
32	(Norway) Stig Johansen	85	213	0.40	1995-2009	Bodø/Glimt	
34	(Norway) Mons Ivar Mjelde	84	173	0.49	1990-2001	Brann, Lillestrøm, Sogndal	
34	(Norway) Sverre Brandhaug	84	225	0.37	1981-1991	Rosenborg	
36	(Norway) Ole Stavrum	82	96	0.85	1962-1967	Lyn	
36	(Norway) Pål Jacobsen	82	158	0.52	1973-1986	HamKam, Vålerenga	
38	(Norway) Willy Fossli	81	108	0.75	1952-1959	Asker	
38	(Norway) Kai Sjøberg	81	155	0.52	1961-1970	Skeid	
38	(Norway) Steinar Aase	81	211	0.38	1973-1985	Brann, Start	
41	(Norway) **Torgeir Børven** ‡	80	233	0.34	2009-	Odd, Vålerenga, Brann, Rosenborg	
42	(Norway) Mustafa Abdellaoue	79	237	0.33	2009-2020	Vålerenga, Tromsø, Aalesund, Strømsgodset, Sarpsborg, Sandefjord	
42	(Norway) Jan-Derek Sørensen	79	300	0.26	1992-2009	Lyn, Bodø/Glimt, Rosenborg, Vålerenga	
44	(Norway) Erik Nevland	78	189	0.42	1997-2012	Viking	
44	(Norway) **Veton Berisha** ‡	78	210	0.37	2011-	Viking, Brann, Molde	
44	(Norway) Geir Henæs	78	227	0.34	1977-1988	Moss	
44	(Hungary) Péter Kovács	78	234	0.34	2003-2017	Tromsø, Viking, Odd, Strømsgodset, Sarpsborg, Sandefjord	
48	(Norway) Per Jacobsen	77	164	0.47	1951-1962	Odd	
49	(Norway) Trygve Johannessen	76	178	0.43	1974-1985	Viking, Brann	
50	(Sweden) Daniel Nannskog	74	114	0.65	2006-2010	Stabæk	
51	(Norway) Jan Tangen	73	139	0.53	1950-1961	Strømmen	
51	(Iceland) Veigar Páll Gunnarsson	73	177	0.42	2001-2012	Strømsgodset, Stabæk, Vålerenga	
53	(Norway) Marcus Pedersen	72	164	0.44	2008-2022	HamKam, Strømsgodset, Vålerenga, Brann	
53	(Norway) Trond Olsen	72	336	0.21	2011-2018	Bodø/Glimt, Lillestrøm, Rosenborg, Viking	
53	(Norway) Daniel Berg Hestad	72	473	0.15	1993-2016	Molde	
56	(Norway) Reidar Sundby	71	110	0.65	1953-1962	Larvik Turn	
56	(Norway) Hans Nordahl	71	148	0.48	1949-1960	Skeid	
56	(Norway) Ingar Pettersen	71	174	0.41	1967-1976	Strømsgodset	
59	(Norway) Arne Larsen Økland	70	145	0.48	1976-1987	Vard, Bryne	
59	(Nigeria) Leke James ‡	70	149	0.47	2012-2020	Aalesund, Molde	
59	(Norway) Egil Solberg	70	150	0.47	1969-1982	Mjøndalen	
59	(Norway) Egil Østenstad	70	161	0.43	1990-2005	Viking	
59	(Norway) Øyvind Storflor	70	421	0.17	1998-2017	Rosenborg, Moss, Strømsgodset, Ranheim	
64	(Norway) Ola Dybwad-Olsen	69	142	0.49	1964-1978	Lyn	
65	(Norway) Harald Berg	68	131	0.52	1964-1979	Lyn, Bodø/Glimt	
66	(Norway) Stein Kollshaugen	67	178	0.38	1974-1987	Raufoss, Moss, HamKam	
67	(Norway) Raymond Kvisvik	66	247	0.27	1998-2009	Moss, Brann, Fredrikstad	
68	(Norway) Frank Strandli	65	153	0.42	1989-1999	Start, Brann, Lillestrøm	
68	(Norway) Ole Bjørn Sundgot	65	225	0.29	1991-2004	Molde, Lyn	
68	(Norway) Runar Berg	65	335	0.19	1991-2009	Rosenborg, Tromsø, Bodø/Glimt, Lyn	
71	(Norway) Åsbjørn Skjærpe	64	133	0.48	1955-1965	Viking	
71	(Norway) Arne Dokken	64	147	0.44	1975-1986	Strømsgodset, Lillestrøm, Rosenborg	
71	(Norway) Tom Lund	64	149	0.43	1975-1982	Lillestrøm	
71	(Norway) Karl Petter Løken	64	208	0.31	1987-1998	Rosenborg, Stabæk	
75	(Denmark) Christian Gytkjær ‡	63	121	0.52	2012-2016	Sandnes Ulf, Haugesund, Rosenborg	
75	(Norway) Geir Frigård	63	177	0.36	1990-2005	Lillestrøm, Kongsvinger, HamKam	
75	(Norway) Mushaga Bakenga ‡	63	180	0.35	2009-2023	Rosenborg, Molde, Tromsø, Ranheim, Odd, Stabæk	
78	(Norway) Pål Sæthrang	62	100	0.62	1963-1969	Skeid	
78	(Norway) Harry Kure	62	142	0.44	1950-1965	Selbak, Sarpsborg	
80	(Norway) Olav Håkon Blengsli	61	99	0.62	1962-1967	Steinkjer	
80	(Iceland) Tryggvi Gudmundsson	61	141	0.43	1998-2003	Tromsø, Stabæk	
80	(Norway) **Bård Finne** ‡	61	183	0.33	2012-	Brann, Vålerenga	
80	(Norway) Martin Andresen	61	294	0.21	1996-2009	Moss, Viking, Stabæk, Molde, Brann, Vålerenga	
84	(Norway) Rolf Birger Pedersen	60	121	0.50	1958-1968	Brann	
84	(Norway) Sten Glenn Håberg	60	193	0.31	1981-1992	Lillestrøm, Start, Brann	
84	(Norway) Bjørn Skjønsberg	60	197	0.30	1972-1983	Skeid, HamKam	
87	(Norway) Kjell Roar Kaasa	59	134	0.44	1992-1999	Kongsvinger, Lyn, Rosenborg, Stabæk, Vålerenga	
87	(Norway) Trond Egil Soltvedt	59	168	0.35	1989-1998	Viking, Brann, Rosenborg	
87	(Norway) Tom Gulbrandsen	59	307	0.19	1983-1997	Mjøndalen, Lillestrøm	
87	(Norway) Simen Brenne	59	315	0.19	2000-2015	Moss, Fredrikstad, Lillestrøm, Odd, Strømsgodset, Sarpsborg	
91	(Norway) Per Knudsen	58	176	0.33	1955-1967	Vålerenga	
92	(Sweden) Rade Prica	57	104	0.55	2009-2012	Rosenborg	
92	(Norway) Bjørn Tronstad	57	112	0.51	1974-1981	Brann	
92	(Norway) Tore André Flo	57	134	0.42	1994-2012	Sogndal, Tromsø, Brann, Vålerenga	
92	(Norway) Leif Eriksen	57	142	0.40	1959-1968	Vålerenga	
92	(Norway) Ola Kamara ‡	57	149	0.38	2009-	Stabæk, Strømsgodset, Molde	
92	(Norway) Einar Bruno Larsen	57	155	0.37	1959-1968	Vålerenga	
92	(Norway) Odd Johnsen	57	180	0.32	1982-1994	Mjøndalen, Brann, Strømsgodset	
92	(Norway) Bent Skammelsrud	57	272	0.21	1990-2002	Rosenborg	
100	(Norway) **Erling Knudtzon** ‡	56	416	0.13	2007-	Lyn, Lillestrøm, Molde	
101	(Norway) Andreas Lund	55	99	0.56	1995-2000	Start, Molde	
101	(Norway) Odd Wangen	55	132	0.42	1950-1961	Strømmen	
101	(Norway) Petter Vaagan Moen	55	274	0.20	2004-2016	HamKam, Brann, Lillestrøm, Strømsgodset	
104	(Norway) Per Ljostveit	54	99	0.55	1953-1961	Larvik Turn	
105	(Norway) Olav Nilsen	53	179	0.30	1960-1974	Viking	
105	(Norway) Alexander Ødegaard	53	227	0.23	2001-2010	Sogndal, Rosenborg, Viking	
107	(Norway) Rune Lange	52	92	0.57	1997-2008	Tromsø, Vålerenga	
108	(Iceland) Ríkharður Daðason	51	81	0.63	1998-2003	Viking, Lillestrøm, Fredrikstad	
108	(Ivory Coast) Franck Boli ‡	51	135	0.38	2012-2019	Stabæk, Aalesund	
108	(Norway) **Magnus Wolff Eikrem** ‡	51	209	0.24	2011-	Molde	
108	(Norway) Aasmund Bjørkan	51	250	0.20	1993-2005	Bodø/Glimt, Vålerenga	
112	(Norway) Arvid Havnås	50	105	0.48	1949-1960	Sandefjord	
112	(Norway) **Espen Ruud** ‡	50	323	0.15	2003-	Odd	
