= 1950 in Norwegian football =

Football in Norway
Men's football
- Hovedserien: Fram
- NM: Fredrikstad

Results from Norwegian football in 1950.

== Hovedserien 1949/50 ==
=== Group A ===
Pos	Team	Pld	W	D	L	GF	GA	GD	Pts	Qualification or relegation
1	Fram Larvik (C)	14	7	6	1	22	13	+9	20	Qualification for the championship final
2	Sarpsborg FK	14	5	7	2	24	17	+7	17	
3	Viking	14	5	6	3	28	20	+8	16	
4	Vålerengen	14	5	6	3	23	24	−1	16	
5	Lyn	14	5	3	6	21	21	0	13	
6	Selbak TIF	14	3	7	4	17	21	−4	13	
7	Ålgård (R)	14	1	7	6	8	18	−10	9	Relegation
8	Storm (R)	14	2	4	8	18	27	−9	8	Relegation

Source: RSSSF
(C) Champions; (R) Relegated

=== Group B ===
Pos	Team	Pld	W	D	L	GF	GA	GD	Pts	Qualification or relegation
1	Fredrikstad	14	8	5	1	38	11	+27	21	Qualification for the championship final
2	Sparta	14	9	3	2	26	9	+17	21	
3	Ørn	14	8	1	5	32	24	+8	17	
4	Skeid	14	6	4	4	19	18	+1	16	
5	Strømmen	14	5	3	6	19	25	−6	13	
6	Sandefjord BK	14	4	3	7	15	25	−10	11	
7	Ranheim (R)	14	3	3	8	10	29	−19	9	Relegation
8	Mjøndalen (R)	14	1	2	11	9	27	−18	4	Relegation

Source: RSSSF
(R) Relegated

=== Championship final ===
June 11: Fredrikstad - Fram 1-1

June 18: Fram - Fredrikstad 1-0 (agg. 2-1)

== First Division ==
=== District I ===
Pos	Team	Pld	W	D	L	GF	GA	GD	Pts	Qualification or relegation
1	Lisleby	14	11	0	3	64	16	+48	22	Play-off
2	Moss	14	8	3	3	30	16	+14	19	
3	Rakkestad	14	9	1	4	29	25	+4	19	
4	Mysen	14	7	1	6	25	31	−6	15	
5	Kvik (Halden)	14	5	3	6	22	20	+2	13	
6	Rapid	14	4	2	8	15	24	−9	10	
7	Tistedalen	14	2	5	7	11	35	−24	9	
8	Gleng	14	2	1	11	9	38	−29	5	Relegated

=== District II; Group A ===
Pos	Team	Pld	W	D	L	GF	GA	GD	Pts	Qualification or relegation
1	Geithus	14	10	3	1	25	16	+9	23	Play-off
2	Sagene	14	10	1	3	35	12	+23	21	
3	Lillestrøm	14	8	3	3	30	14	+16	19	
4	Asker	14	6	4	4	25	19	+6	16	
5	Drammens BK	14	6	2	6	32	27	+5	14	
6	Frigg	14	5	2	7	20	18	+2	12	Relegation play-off
7	Birkebeineren	14	1	2	11	14	44	−30	4	Relegated
8	Varg	14	1	1	12	17	48	−31	3	Relegated

=== District II; Group B ===
Pos	Team	Pld	W	D	L	GF	GA	GD	Pts	Qualification or relegation
1	Solberg	14	10	1	3	41	26	+15	21	Play-off
2	Sandaker	14	6	6	2	20	13	+7	18	
3	Nydalen	14	7	1	6	23	24	−1	15	
4	Drafn	14	6	2	6	26	18	+8	14	
5	Kjelsås	14	5	3	6	18	21	−3	13	
6	Kongsberg	14	5	2	7	23	21	+2	12	Relegation play-off
7	Jordal	14	4	3	7	14	30	−16	11	Relegated
8	Slemmestad	14	3	2	9	18	30	−12	8	Relegated

=== District III ===
Pos	Team	Pld	W	D	L	GF	GA	GD	Pts	Qualification or relegation
1	Hamar IL	14	8	4	2	37	15	+22	20	Play-off
2	Kapp	14	8	4	2	35	14	+21	20	
3	Gjøvik/Lyn	14	8	3	3	48	17	+31	19	
4	Fremad	14	8	1	5	47	22	+25	17	
5	Mesna	14	7	2	5	24	14	+10	16	
6	Hamarkameratene	14	6	3	5	27	22	+5	15	
7	Brumunddal	14	1	1	12	9	61	−52	3	Relegated
8	Gjøvik SK	14	0	2	12	10	72	−62	2	Relegated

=== District IV, Group A ===
Pos	Team	Pld	W	D	L	GF	GA	GD	Pts	Qualification or relegation
1	Odd	14	13	1	0	57	10	+47	27	Play-off
2	Pors	14	8	2	4	33	25	+8	18	
3	Falk	14	7	1	6	30	26	+4	15	
4	Skiens BK	14	7	1	6	30	28	+2	15	
5	Brevik	14	6	2	6	27	30	−3	14	
6	Stag	14	6	1	7	26	30	−4	13	
7	Tønsbergkam.	14	2	1	11	19	38	−19	5	Relegated
8	Rjukan	14	2	1	11	21	56	−35	5	Relegated

=== District IV; Group B ===
Pos	Team	Pld	W	D	L	GF	GA	GD	Pts	Qualification or relegation
1	Larvik Turn	14	10	2	2	55	12	+43	22	Play-off
2	Herkules	14	8	2	4	32	22	+10	18	
3	Borg	14	8	2	4	26	18	+8	18	
4	Snøgg	14	7	2	5	25	17	+8	16	
5	Eik	14	6	3	5	33	27	+6	15	
6	Skiens-Grane	14	5	3	6	22	25	−3	13	
7	Ulefoss	14	1	3	10	9	38	−29	5	Relegated
8	Skotfoss	14	1	3	10	5	48	−43	5	Relegated

=== District V, Group A ===
Pos	Team	Pld	W	D	L	GF	GA	GD	Pts	Qualification or relegation
1	Start	12	6	3	3	25	17	+8	15	Play-off
2	Jerv	12	6	2	4	19	19	0	14	
3	Flekkefjord	12	5	3	4	14	12	+2	13	
4	Grane (Arendal)	12	4	5	3	13	20	−7	13	
5	Mandalskam.	12	4	4	4	13	12	+1	12	
6	AIK Lund	12	2	5	5	13	15	−2	9	
7	Donn	12	2	4	6	17	19	−2	8	Relegated

=== District V, Group B ===
Pos	Team	Pld	W	D	L	GF	GA	GD	Pts	Qualification or relegation
1	Stavanger IF	14	12	1	1	63	12	+51	25	Play-off
2	Bryne	14	8	3	3	31	19	+12	19	
3	Vard	14	6	3	5	23	26	−3	15	
4	Nærbø	14	6	2	6	27	37	−10	14	
5	Djerv 1919	14	4	6	4	20	30	−10	14	
6	Ulf	14	5	3	6	26	23	+3	13	Relegated
7	Jarl	14	3	2	9	22	42	−20	8	Relegated
8	Kopervik	14	2	0	12	18	41	−23	4	Relegated

=== District VI ===
Pos	Team	Pld	W	D	L	GF	GA	GD	Pts	Qualification
1	Brann	10	8	0	2	39	14	+25	16	Play-off
2	Os	10	6	2	2	28	17	+11	14	
3	Varegg	10	4	2	4	19	23	−4	10	
5	Djerv	10	3	4	3	22	28	−6	10	
6	Årstad	10	3	3	4	22	18	+4	9	
7	Hardy	10	0	1	9	7	37	−30	1	

=== District VII ===
Pos	Team	Pld	W	D	L	GF	GA	GD	Pts	Qualification
1	Kristiansund	10	5	5	0	23	12	+11	15	Play-off
2	Aalesund	10	5	5	0	21	13	+8	15	
3	Molde	10	4	3	3	20	13	+7	11	
4	Braatt	10	3	4	3	18	19	−1	10	
5	Rollon	10	1	3	6	13	27	−14	5	
6	Clausenengen	10	0	4	6	10	21	−11	4	

=== District VIII ===
Pos	Team	Pld	W	D	L	GF	GA	GD	Pts	Qualification or relegation
1	Kvik (Trondheim)	14	11	0	3	37	14	+23	22	Play-off
2	Freidig	14	10	0	4	33	14	+19	20	
3	Brage	14	7	2	5	37	30	+7	16	
4	Falken	14	6	3	5	32	26	+6	15	
5	Rosenborg	14	6	2	6	23	30	−7	14	
6	Nessegutten	14	5	3	6	33	32	+1	13	Relegated
7	Stjørdal	14	2	2	10	19	43	−24	6	Relegated
8	Verdal	14	2	2	10	25	50	−25	6	Relegated

=== Play-off Preliminary Round ===
May 29: Solberg - Geithus 0-2

May 31: Odd - Larvik Turn 3-0

Start - Stavanger 2-3

June 4: Geithus - Solberg 1-1 (agg. 3-1)

Stavanger - Start 3-1 (agg. 6-3)

June 7: Larvik Turn - Odd 2-0 (agg. 2-3)

=== Play-off Group A ===
June 11: Stavanger - Brann 2-2

Hamar - Lisleby 1-3

June 18: Lisleby - Stavanger 2-0

Brann - Hamar 6-0

July 2: Lisleby - Brann 2-3

Stavanger - Hamar 5-2

Pos	Team	Pld	W	D	L	GF	GA	GD	Pts	Promotion
1	Brann	3	2	1	0	11	4	+7	5	Promoted
2	Lisleby	3	2	0	1	7	4	+3	4	Promoted
3	Stavanger IF	3	1	1	1	7	6	+1	3	
4	Hamar IL	3	0	0	3	3	14	−11	0	

=== Play-off Group B ===
June 11: Geithus - Odd 1-2

Kristiansund - Kvik 1-0

June 18: Odd - Kristiansund 2-0

Kvik - Geithus 5-2

July 2: Odd - Kvik 2-0

.Geithus - Kristiansund 1-1

Pos	Team	Pld	W	D	L	GF	GA	GD	Pts	Promotion
1	Odd	3	3	0	0	6	1	+5	6	Promoted
2	Kristiansund	3	1	1	1	2	3	−1	3	Promoted
3	Kvik (Trondheim)	3	1	0	2	5	5	0	2	
4	Geithus	3	0	1	2	4	8	−4	1	

=== Relegation play-off ===
Kongsberg - Frigg 1-1

Frigg - Kongsberg 2-0 (agg. 3-1)

Kongsberg relegated.

=== Promoted to first division ===
Akademisk, Askim, Baune, Bjørkelangen, Borgen, Bækkelaget, Flint, Hødd, Nordnes, Randaberg, Raufoss, Sportsklubben 31, Steinkjer, Strong, Sørfjell, Tryggkameratene, Tønsberg Turn, Urædd, Vang and Vidar.

== Norwegian Cup ==
=== Final ===
22 October 1950

Fredrikstad	3–0	Brann
Olsen 7'; Larsen 61'; Spydevold 64'	Report

Ullevaal Stadion, Oslo
Attendance: 35,367
Referee: Josef Larsen (Frigg)

== Northern Norwegian Cup ==
=== Final ===
Narvik/Nor	5–1	Nordild
	Report

== National team ==
22 June 1950 1948–51 Nordic Championship	Denmark	4–0	Norway	Copenhagen, Denmark
19:00 (UTC+1); Match 170	Petersen 21'; E. Hansen 38' (pen.); J. P. Hansen 48'; Jensen 58'	Report		Stadium: Københavns Idrætspark; Attendance: 35,500; Referee: Tore Sjöberg (Sweden)

15 August 1950 Friendly	Norway	2–2	Luxembourg	Bergen, Norway
18:00 (UTC+1); Match 171	Thoresen 60'; Andersen 78'	Report	Letsch 6'; Muller 59'	Stadium: Brann Stadion; Attendance: 16,000; Referee: Ernst Hansen (Denmark)

10 September 1950 1948–51 Nordic Championship	Norway	4–1	Finland	Oslo, Norway
13:15 (UTC+1); Match 172	Bredesen 10'; Andresen 50', 52'; Thoresen 81'	Report	Lilja 87'	Stadium: Ullevaal Stadion; Attendance: 28,935; Referee: Ludvig Jørkov (Denmark)

24 September 1950 1948–51 Nordic Championship	Norway	1–3	Sweden	Oslo, Norway
13:15 (UTC+1); Match 173	Karlsen 88' (pen.)	Report	Jönsson 53', 79'; Palmér 55'	Stadium: Ullevaal Stadion; Attendance: 35,552; Referee: Folke Nyberg (Finland)

5 November 1950 Friendly	Yugoslavia	4–0	Norway	Belgrade, Yugoslavia
14:15 (UTC+1); Match 174	Ognjanov 35', 46'; Mitić 40'; Rupnik 45'	Report		Stadium: JNA Stadium; Attendance: 55,000; Referee: Klaas Schipper (Netherlands)

26 November 1950 Friendly	Republic of Ireland	2–2	Norway	Dublin, Republic of Ireland
14:30 (UTC); Match 175	Carey 24'; Walsh 61'	Report	Bredesen 6'; Andresen 11'	Stadium: Dalymount Park; Attendance: 31,215; Referee: Henry Pearce (England)
