= 1950 Norwegian Football Cup =

Norgesmesterskapet i fotball for menn 1950

Tournament details
- Country: Norway
- Teams: 98 (main competition)

Final positions
- Champions: Fredrikstad (6th title)
- Runners-up: Brann

The 1950 Norwegian Football Cup was the 45th season of the Norwegian annual knockout football tournament. The tournament was open for all members of NFF, except those from Northern Norway. The final was played at Ullevaal Stadion in Oslo on 22 October 1950, and was contested by five-time former winners Fredrikstad and the two-time former winners Brann. Fredrikstad won the final 3–0, and secured their sixth title. Sarpsborg were the defending champions, but were eliminated by Fredrikstad in the semi-final.

The 10 teams that were involved in the series final and qualification for promotion to the Hovedserien (Fram (Larvik), Fredrikstad, Brann, Lisleby, Stavanger, Hamar, Odd, Kristiansund, Kvik (Trondheim) and Geithus) therefore got a walkover in the first and second round.

== First round ==
Team 1	Score	Team 2
Asker	2–1	Glassverket
Birkebeineren	0–2	Sagene
Bryne	2–0	Mandalskameratene
Clausenengen	1–5	Molde
Djerv	2–2 (a.e.t.)	Baune
Drafn	0–6	Sandefjord BK
Drammens BK	4–2	Urædd
Falken	1–2	Nessegutten
Fossekallen	4–5	Kapp
Frigg	1–2	Fremad Lillehammer
Gjøvik-Lyn	4–0	Vito
Grue	2–5	HamKam
Kjelsås	1–2	Jevnaker
Kvik (Halden)	1–4	Sandaker
Larvik Turn	3–1 (a.e.t.)	Vestfossen
Lillestrøm	5–3 (a.e.t.)	Mysen
Mesna	1–4	Lyn
Mjøndalen	3–1 (a.e.t.)	Skiens BK
Moss	3–1 (a.e.t.)	Spartacus
Nordnes	0–3	Os
Nærbø	1–2 (a.e.t.)	Viking
Pors	3–0	Snøgg
Rakkestad	0–1	Borgen
Ranheim	2–2 (a.e.t.)	Steinkjer
Raumnes & Årnes	0–4	Vålerengen
Rollon	2–3	Braatt
Rosenborg	0–1	Nidar
Sarpsborg	7–0	Hard
Selbak	8–1	Rygge
Skeid	3–1	Greåker
Skiens-Grane	0–3	Solberg
Skiold	2–0	Nydalen
Sportsklubben 1931 (Notodden)	3–0	Borg
Start	1–1 (a.e.t.)	Ålgård
Steinberg	0–1	Sparta
Storm	0–1	Kongsberg
Strømmen	4–2	Blaker
Tryggkam	1–1 (a.e.t.)	'Freidig
Vard	1–3	Jarl
Verdal	3–1	Brage
Vindbjart	4–3	Sørfjell
Ørn	3–1	Torp
Aalesund	2–0	Sandane
Årstad	1–0 (a.e.t.)	Djerv 1919
Replay
Baune	3–2	Djerv
Freidig	2–0	Tryggkam
Steinkjer	1–3	Ranheim
Ålgård	1–3	Start

== Second round ==
Team 1	Score	Team 2
Braatt	2–0	Molde
Freidig	2–0	Aalesund
Fremad Lillehammer	0–4	Sarpsborg
Gjøvik-Lyn	0–1 (a.e.t.)	Lillestrøm
Jarl	1–4	Årstad
Jevnaker	0–4	Skeid
Kapp	3–5	Drammens BK
Kongsberg	1–2	Moss
Lyn	3–1	Sportsklubben 1931 (Notodden)
Nessegutten	3–2 (a.e.t.)	Verdal
Os	3–2 (a.e.t.)	Bryne
Pors	0–0 (a.e.t.)	Mjøndalen
Ranheim	4–0	Nidar
Sagene	2–1	Selbak
Sandaker	3–0	Larvik Turn
Sandefjord BK	0–0 (a.e.t.)	Asker
Skiold	1–2	Ørn
Solberg	2–1	Strømmen
Sparta	4–2	HamKam
Start	3–1	Vindbjart
Viking	6–1	Baune
Vålerengen	3–0	Borgen
Replay
Asker	1–0	Sandefjord BK
Mjøndalen	1–1 (a.e.t.)	Pors
2nd replay
Pors	2–0	Mjøndalen

== Third round ==
Team 1	Score	Team 2
30 July 1950
Skeid	4–0	Solberg
Sandaker	2–3	Odd
Asker	2–1	Viking
Lillestrøm	3–2	Freidig
Drammens BK	1–3	Fredrikstad
Sarpsborg	9–0	Braatt
Hamar	2–3 (a.e.t.)	Sparta
Pors	4–2	Vålerengen
Start	1–2	Fram (Larvik)
Kvik (Trondheim)	7–1	Sagene
Lisleby	3–1	Geithus
Moss	2–6	Brann
Ørn	4–1	Nessegutten
Stavanger	4–2	Os
Årstad	1–5	Lyn
Kristiansund	4–2	Ranheim

== Fourth round ==
Team 1	Score	Team 2
27 August 1950
Stavanger	1–2 (a.e.t.)	Sarpsborg
Brann	4–1	Pors
Lyn	3–1	Lillestrøm
Sparta	5–2 (a.e.t.)	Asker
Kvik (Trondheim)	0–1	Ørn
Fredrikstad	6–1	Kristiansund
Odd	3–1	Lisleby
Fram (Larvik)	4–1	Skeid

== Quarter-finals ==
Team 1	Score	Team 2
1 October 1950
Lyn	3–1	Sparta
Brann	3–1	Odd
Sarpsborg	1–1 (a.e.t.)	Fram (Larvik)
Ørn	0–1	Fredrikstad
Replay: 4 October 1950
Fram (Larvik)	0–5	Sarpsborg

== Semi-finals ==
Team 1	Score	Team 2
8 October 1950
Fredrikstad	3–0	Sarpsborg
Brann	2–1	Lyn

== Final ==
22 October 1950

Fredrikstad	3–0	Brann
Olsen 7'; Larsen 61'; Spydevold 64'	Report

Ullevaal Stadion, Oslo
Attendance: 35,367
Referee: Josef Larsen (Frigg)

== See also ==
- 1949–50 Norwegian Main League
- 1950 in Norwegian football
