= Molde FK–Rosenborg BK rivalry =

Football rivalry in Norway

Molde FK v Rosenborg BK
- Teams: Molde; Rosenborg
- First meeting: 25 June 1967; Norwegian Cup 3rd round Rosenborg 4–1 Molde
- Latest meeting: 14 March 2025; Eliteserien; Molde 2–0 Rosenborg
- Next meeting: 22 November 2026; Eliteserien; Rosenborg v Molde
- Stadiums: Aker Stadion (Molde); Lerkendal Stadion (Rosenborg)

Statistics
- Total meetings: 104
- Most wins: Rosenborg (54)
- Most player appearances: Daniel Berg Hestad (43)
- All-time series: Molde: 34; Drawn: 16; Rosenborg: 54
- Largest victory: Molde 1–7 Rosenborg; 8 September 1990 (1990 1. divisjon)

The rivalry between Molde and Rosenborg is a notable one in Norwegian football as both clubs are recognised for having great history and traditions.

The rivalry had increased importance in the 1990s, as Rosenborg enjoyed the most successful period in the history of the club and Molde developed their team to become Rosenborgs biggest challenger for many seasons. From 1992 to 2004, Rosenborg became champions of Eliteserien thirteen times in succession. In the same period of time Molde won the Norwegian Cup in 1994 and finished second in the league four times (1995, 1998, 1999, 2002).

The status of the rivalry increased during the 90s due to numerous fights for the title. On 8 September 1990, Rosenborg won 7–1 away which, as of 2022, still is the biggest winning margin. The teams met in the semi-final of the 1994 Norwegian Cup. Molde won 2–1 at home and drew 2–2 in Trondheim, and with a 4–3 win on aggregate, Molde qualified for their third cup final. After having lost on aggregate, Rosenborg head coach Nils Arne Eggen called Molde's playing style for "arse-football" ("rævvafotball"). The term has later become a common way to describe football perceived as defensive or boring to watch.

In 2022, Molde won the league with four games to spare. Before the following game against Rosenborg, Rosenborg stated in a press release that they would refuse to stand guard of honour for the champions as they claimed Molde would use it to humiliate them.

== Honours ==
- † Numbers with this background and symbol are italicised to denote club holds record in the competition.

| Honour | Molde | Rosenborg | Total |
|---|---|---|---|
| Eliteserien | 5 | 26 † | 31 |
| Norwegian Cup | 6 | 12* † | 18 |
| Superfinalen / Mesterfinalen | 0 | 3 † | 3 |
| Overall | 11 | 41 | 52 |

- (*) = Shared with Odds BK.

== Results ==
=== Head-to-head ===
| Competition | Played | Molde wins | Drawn | Rosenborg wins | Molde goals | Rosenborg goals |
|---|---|---|---|---|---|---|
| Eliteserien | 92 | 29 | 15 | 48 | 108 | 155 |
| Norwegian Cup | 11 | 4 | 1 | 6 | 21 | 27 |
| Total | 103 | 33 | 16 | 54 | 129 | 182 |

=== All-time results ===
==== Molde in the league at home ====
| Date | Venue | Score | Competition |
|---|---|---|---|
| 21 August 1974 | Molde Stadion (old) | 2–1 | 1. divisjon |
| 12 May 1975 | Molde Stadion (old) | 1–0 | 1. divisjon |
| 22 August 1976 | Molde Stadion (old) | 3–0 | 1. divisjon |
| 28 August 1977 | Molde Stadion (old) | 2–0 | 1. divisjon |
| 5 October 1980 | Molde Stadion (old) | 0–2 | 1. divisjon |
| 31 May 1982 | Molde Stadion (old) | 1–1 | 1. divisjon |
| 19 August 1984 | Molde Stadion (old) | 2–2 | 1. divisjon |
| 2 June 1985 | Molde Stadion (old) | 0–2 | 1. divisjon |
| 14 September 1986 | Molde Stadion (old) | 1–0 | 1. divisjon |
| 13 June 1987 | Molde Stadion (old) | 1–1 | 1. divisjon |
| 21 August 1988 | Molde Stadion (old) | 2–4 | 1. divisjon |
| 6 May 1989 | Molde Stadion (old) | 3–1 | 1. divisjon |
| 8 September 1990 | Molde Stadion (old) | 1–7 | 1. divisjon |
| 4 May 1991 | Molde Stadion (old) | 4–1 | Tippeligaen |
| 9 August 1992 | Molde Stadion (old) | 2–0 | Tippeligaen |
| 20 June 1993 | Molde Stadion (old) | 0–2 | Tippeligaen |
| 2 July 1995 | Molde Stadion (old) | 2–2 | Tippeligaen |
| 30 June 1996 | Molde Stadion (old) | 0–3 | Tippeligaen |
| 22 June 1997 | Molde Stadion (old) | 0–4 | Tippeligaen |
| 26 September 1998 | Aker Stadion | 0–2 | Tippeligaen |
| 24 May 1999 | Aker Stadion | 0–2 | Tippeligaen |
| 12 July 2000 | Aker Stadion | 0–1 | Tippeligaen |
| 22 July 2001 | Aker Stadion | 1–1 | Tippeligaen |
| 17 August 2002 | Aker Stadion | 1–2 | Tippeligaen |
| 5 October 2003 | Aker Stadion | 0–2 | Tippeligaen |
| 29 August 2004 | Aker Stadion | 1–3 | Tippeligaen |
| 17 September 2005 | Aker Stadion | 4–1 | Tippeligaen |
| 13 August 2006 | Aker Stadion | 0–2 | Tippeligaen |
| 24 May 2008 | Aker Stadion | 1–2 | Tippeligaen |
| 27 August 2009 | Aker Stadion | 0–2 | Tippeligaen |
| 14 March 2010 | Aker Stadion | 1–2 | Tippeligaen |
| 8 May 2011 | Aker Stadion | 0–2 | Tippeligaen |
| 28 October 2012 | Aker Stadion | 2–0 | Tippeligaen |
| 26 October 2013 | Aker Stadion | 1–0 | Tippeligaen |
| 27 July 2014 | Aker Stadion | 3–1 | Tippeligaen |
| 20 September 2015 | Aker Stadion | 1–0 | Tippeligaen |
| 24 September 2016 | Aker Stadion | 1–3 | Tippeligaen |
| 12 August 2017 | Aker Stadion | 1–2 | Eliteserien |
| 30 September 2018 | Aker Stadion | 1–0 | Eliteserien |
| 28 April 2019 | Aker Stadion | 3–0 | Eliteserien |
| 20 June 2020 | Aker Stadion | 1–0 | Eliteserien |
| 21 November 2021 | Aker Stadion | 4–1 | Eliteserien |
| 23 October 2022 | Aker Stadion | 2–1 | Eliteserien |
| 16 April 2023 | Aker Stadion | 1–1 | Eliteserien |
| 11 May 2024 | Aker Stadion | 2–2 | Eliteserien |
| 1 November 2025 | Aker Stadion | 4–2 | Eliteserien |
| 14 March 2026 | Aker Stadion | 2–0 | Eliteserien |

==== Rosenborg in the league at home ====
| Date | Venue | Score | Competition |
|---|---|---|---|
| 15 May 1974 | Lerkendal Stadion | 2–1 | 1. divisjon |
| 25 August 1975 | Lerkendal Stadion | 3–2 | 1. divisjon |
| 15 May 1976 | Lerkendal Stadion | 1–0 | 1. divisjon |
| 19 May 1977 | Lerkendal Stadion | 2–0 | 1. divisjon |
| 16 June 1980 | Lerkendal Stadion | 2–5 | 1. divisjon |
| 5 September 1982 | Lerkendal Stadion | 0–1 | 1. divisjon |
| 16 May 1984 | Lerkendal Stadion | 3–1 | 1. divisjon |
| 8 September 1985 | Lerkendal Stadion | 4–1 | 1. divisjon |
| 13 August 1986 | Lerkendal Stadion | 1–1 | 1. divisjon |
| 12 September 1987 | Lerkendal Stadion | 0–2 | 1. divisjon |
| 23 May 1988 | Lerkendal Stadion | 4–2 | 1. divisjon |
| 30 July 1989 | Lerkendal Stadion | 1–1 | 1. divisjon |
| 10 June 1990 | Lerkendal Stadion | 0–1 | 1. divisjon |
| 28 July 1991 | Lerkendal Stadion | 3–0 | Tippeligaen |
| 10 May 1992 | Lerkendal Stadion | 2–0 | Tippeligaen |
| 12 September 1993 | Lerkendal Stadion | 2–0 | Tippeligaen |
| 4 October 1995 | Lerkendal Stadion | 2–0 | Tippeligaen |
| 14 April 1996 | Lerkendal Stadion | 2–0 | Tippeligaen |
| 19 October 1997 | Lerkendal Stadion | 2–1 | Tippeligaen |
| 1 July 1998 | Lerkendal Stadion | 1–2 | Tippeligaen |
| 29 August 1999 | Lerkendal Stadion | 2–1 | Tippeligaen |
| 29 April 2000 | Lerkendal Stadion | 0–1 | Tippeligaen |
| 22 April 2001 | Lerkendal Stadion | 2–1 | Tippeligaen |
| 9 May 2002 | Lerkendal Stadion | 3–0 | Tippeligaen |
| 14 June 2003 | Lerkendal Stadion | 5–0 | Tippeligaen |
| 16 May 2004 | Lerkendal Stadion | 0–2 | Tippeligaen |
| 22 May 2005 | Lerkendal Stadion | 1–1 | Tippeligaen |
| 30 April 2006 | Lerkendal Stadion | 0–1 | Tippeligaen |
| 10 August 2008 | Lerkendal Stadion | 3–1 | Tippeligaen |
| 16 May 2009 | Lerkendal Stadion | 2–2 | Tippeligaen |
| 22 August 2010 | Lerkendal Stadion | 3–1 | Tippeligaen |
| 7 August 2011 | Lerkendal Stadion | 3–1 | Tippeligaen |
| 8 July 2012 | Lerkendal Stadion | 1–0 | Tippeligaen |
| 20 May 2013 | Lerkendal Stadion | 0–0 | Tippeligaen |
| 4 May 2014 | Lerkendal Stadion | 0–2 | Tippeligaen |
| 27 June 2015 | Lerkendal Stadion | 1–1 | Tippeligaen |
| 28 May 2016 | Lerkendal Stadion | 3–1 | Tippeligaen |
| 8 April 2017 | Lerkendal Stadion | 2–1 | Eliteserien |
| 8 April 2018 | Lerkendal Stadion | 4–0 | Eliteserien |
| 27 October 2019 | Lerkendal Stadion | 3–1 | Eliteserien |
| 13 December 2020 | Lerkendal Stadion | 3–1 | Eliteserien |
| 24 May 2021 | Lerkendal Stadion | 2–3 | Eliteserien |
| 24 April 2022 | Lerkendal Stadion | 0–0 | Eliteserien |
| 5 November 2023 | Lerkendal Stadion | 3–1 | Eliteserien |
| 1 September 2024 | Lerkendal Stadion | 2–1 | Eliteserien |
| 27 April 2025 | Lerkendal Stadion | 0–0 | Eliteserien |

League home record
| Home Team | Wins | Losses | Draws |
| Molde | 19 | 20 | 7 |
| Rosenborg | 28 | 10 | 8 |

Overall League Head-to-head record
| Molde wins | Rosenborg wins | Draws |
| 29 | 48 | 15 |

==== Results in domestic cup matches ====
| Date | Venue | Matches | | | Competition |
| Date | Venue | Team 1 | Score | Team 2 | Competition |
|---|---|---|---|---|---|
| 25 June 1967 | Lerkendal Stadion | Rosenborg | 4–1 | Molde | Norwegian Cup 3rd Round |
| 15 August 1971 | Molde Stadion (old) | Molde | 0–1 | Rosenborg | Norwegian Cup 4th Round |
| 2 September 1973 | Lerkendal Stadion | Rosenborg | 3–0 | Molde | Norwegian Cup Quarter-final |
| 23 August 1978 | Lerkendal Stadion | Rosenborg | 2–0 | Molde | Norwegian Cup 4th Round |
| 22 August 1984 | Lerkendal Stadion | Rosenborg | 7–2 | Molde | Norwegian Cup 4th Round |
| 24 August 1988 | Molde Stadion (old) | Molde | 1–2 (a.e.t.) | Rosenborg | Norwegian Cup Quarter-final |
| 3 September 1994 | Molde Stadion (old) | Molde | 2–1 | Rosenborg | Norwegian Cup Semi-final 1st leg |
| 10 September 1994 | Lerkendal Stadion | Rosenborg | 2–2 | Molde | Norwegian Cup Semi-final 2nd leg |
| 9 August 2009 | Aker Stadion | Molde | 5–0 | Rosenborg | Norwegian Cup Quarter-final |
| 27 June 2012 | Aker Stadion | Molde | 4–3 | Rosenborg | Norwegian Cup 4th Round |
| 24 November 2013 | Ullevaal Stadion | Rosenborg | 2–4 | Molde | Norwegian Cup final |

Overall Domestic Cup Head-to-head record
| Molde wins | Rosenborg wins | Draws |
| 4 | 6 | 1 |

== Records and statistics ==
- First competitive meeting: Rosenborg 4–1 Molde, Norwegian Cup third round, 25 June 1967
- First league meeting: Rosenborg 2–1 Molde, 1. divisjon, 15 May 1974
- First Norwegian Cup meeting: Rosenborg 4–1 Molde, third round, 25 June 1967
- First away victory for Molde: 5–2 vs Rosenborg, 1. divisjon, 16 June 1980
- First away victory for Rosenborg: 1–0 vs Molde, Norwegian Cup, 15 August 1971
- Highest scoring game: Rosenborg 7–2 Molde, Norwegian Cup, 22 August 1984
- Largest winning margin (Rosenborg): 6 goals – 7–1 vs Molde, 1. divisjon, 8 September 1990
- Largest winning margin (Molde): 5 goals – 5–0 vs Rosenborg, Norwegian Cup quarter-final, 9 August 2009
- Most consecutive wins (Rosenborg): 5, joint record:
  - 4 October 1995 – 19 October 1997
  - 27 September 2009 – 7 August 2011
  - 28 May 2016 – 8 April 2018
- Most consecutive wins (Molde): 4, 26 October 2013 – 27 July 2014
- Longest undefeated run (Molde): 8 – 6 wins and 2 draws over 28 October 2012 to 20 September 2015
- Longest undefeated run (Rosenborg): 7 – 6 wins and 1 draw over 12 July 2000 to 5 October 2003
- Most consecutive draws: 2, 10 September 1994 – 2 July 1995
- Most games played against each other in a season: 3, in the 1984, 1988, 2009, 2012 and 2013 seasons

=== Doubles ===
Rosenborg have achieved the double in thirteen seasons (most recently in the 2017 season), while Molde have managed to win both league matches twice, in 2014 and 2021.

==== Rosenborg doubles ====
| Season | Home | Away |
|---|---|---|
| 1985 | 4–1 | 2–0 |
| 1988 | 4–1 | 4–2 |
| 1993 | 2–0 | 2–0 |
| 1996 | 2–0 | 3–0 |
| 1997 | 2–1 | 4–0 |
| 1999 | 2–1 | 2–0 |
| 2002 | 3–0 | 2–1 |
| 2003 | 5–0 | 2–0 |
| 2008 | 3–1 | 2–1 |
| 2010 | 3–1 | 2–1 |
| 2011 | 3–1 | 2–0 |
| 2016 | 3–1 | 3–1 |
| 2017 | 2–1 | 2–1 |

==== Molde doubles ====
| Season | Home | Away |
|---|---|---|
| 2014 | 3–1 | 2–0 |
| 2021 | 4–1 | 3–2 |

=== Most appearances ===
| Club | Player | League | Cup | Total |
|---|---|---|---|---|
| Molde | Daniel Berg Hestad | 38 | 5 | 43 |
| Rosenborg | Roar Strand^{1} | 26 | 3 | 29 |

^{1}Roar Strand played 29 games for Rosenborg and two games for Molde

== Players who have represented both clubs ==
The following footballers have played for both Molde and Rosenborg:

| Player | First Club | Dates at First Club | Dates at Second Club |
|---|---|---|---|
| Mushaga Bakenga | Rosenborg | 2007–2012 & 2016–2017 | 2015–2016 (loan) |
| Petter Belsvik | Molde | 1989–1991 | 2000–2001 |
| Karl Oskar Fjørtoft | Rosenborg | 1996–1997 | 1997–2002 |
| Hugo Hansen | Molde | 1989 | 1990–1991 |
| Erik Hoftun | Molde | 1992–1993 | 1994–2005 |
| Even Hovland | Molde | 2012–2014 | 2018–2021 |
| Martin Høyem | Rosenborg | 2001–2003 | 2003–2005 |
| Tor Gunnar Johnsen | Rosenborg | 1993 | 1994–1995 |
| Øyvind Leonhardsen | Molde | 1989–1991 | 1992–1994 |
| Odd Inge Olsen | Molde | 1997–2001 | 2001–2004 |
| Aksel Berget Skjølsvik | Rosenborg | 2006 | 2007–2010 |
| Magnus Stamnestrø | Molde | 2010–2014 | 2015–2018 |
| Christian Steen | Rosenborg | 1997 | 2008–2012 |
| Roar Strand | Rosenborg | 1989–2010 | 1993 (loan) |
| Rafik Zekhnini | Rosenborg | 2018 (loan) | 2021–2023 |

== Head-to-head ranking in Eliteserien ==
| P. | 63 | 64 | 65 | 66 | 67 | 68 | 69 | 70 | 71 | 72 | 73 | 74 | 75 | 76 | 77 | 78 | 79 | 80 | 81 | 82 | 83 | 84 | 85 | 86 | 87 | 88 | 89 | 90 | 91 | 92 | 93 | 94 | 95 | 96 | 97 | 98 | 99 | 00 | 01 | 02 | 03 | 04 | 05 | 06 | 07 | 08 | 09 | 10 | 11 | 12 | 13 | 14 | 15 | 16 | 17 | 18 | 19 | 20 | 21 | 22 | 23 |
|---|---|---|---|---|---|---|---|---|---|---|---|---|---|---|---|---|---|---|---|---|---|---|---|---|---|---|---|---|---|---|---|---|---|---|---|---|---|---|---|---|---|---|---|---|---|---|---|---|---|---|---|---|---|---|---|---|---|---|---|---|---|
| 1 | | | | | 1 | | 1 | | 1 | | | | | | | | | | | | | | 1 | | | 1 | | 1 | | 1 | 1 | 1 | 1 | 1 | 1 | 1 | 1 | 1 | 1 | 1 | 1 | 1 | | 1 | | | 1 | 1 | 1 | 1 | | 1 | 1 | 1 | 1 | 1 | 1 | | | 1 | |
| 2 | | | | | | 2 | | 2 | | | 2 | 2 | | | | | | | | | | | | | 2 | | 2 | | 2 | | | | 2 | | | 2 | 2 | | | 2 | | | | | | | 2 | | | | 2 | 2 | | | 2 | 2 | | 2 | 2 | | |
| 3 | | | | | | | | | | | | | | | 3 | | | | 3 | | | | | | | 3 | | 3 | | | | | | | | | | | | | | | | | | | | | 3 | 3 | | | | | | | 3 | | | 3 | |
| 4 | | | | | | | | | | 4 | | | 4 | | | | | | | | | | | | 4 | | 4 | | | | | | | | 4 | | | | | | | | | | | | | | | | | | | | | | | 4 | | | |
| 5 | | | | | | | | | | | | | | | | | | 5 | | | | | | | | | | | | | | | | | | | | | 5 | | | | | | 5 | 5 | | | | | | | | 5 | | | | | 5 | | 5 |
| 6 | | | | | | | | | | | | | | 6 | | | 6 | | | 6 | | 6 | | | | | | | | 6 | | | | | | | | | | | | | | | | | | | | | 6 | | 6 | | | | | | | | |
| 7 | | | | | | | | | | | | | | | | | | | | | 7 | | | | | | | | 7 | | | | | | | | | 7 | | | | | 7 | | | | | | | | | | | | | | | | | | |
| 8 | | | | | | | | | | | | 8 | 8 | 8 | | | | | | | | 8 | 8 | 8 | | | | | | | | | | 8 | | | | | | | | | | | | | | | | | | | | | | | | | | | |
| 9 | | | | | | | | | | | | | | | | | | | | | | | | 9 | | | | | | | | | | | | | | | | | 9 | | | | | 9 | | | | | | | | | | | | | | | 9 |
| 10 | | | | | | | | | | | | | | | | 10 | | 10 | | | | | | | | | | | | | 10 | | | | | | | | | | | | | | | | | | | | | | | | | | | | | | |
| 11 | | | | | | | | | | | | | | | | | | | | | | | | | | | | | | | | | | | | | | | | | | 11 | | | | | | 11 | | | | | | | | | | | | | |
| 12 | | | | | | | | | | | | | | | 12 | | | | | 12 | | | | | | | | | | | | | | | | | | | | | | | 12 | | | | | | | | | | | | | | | | | | |
| 13 | | | | | | | | | | | | | | | | | | | | | | | | | | | | | | | | | | | | | | | | | | | | | | | | | | | | | | | | | | | | | |
| 14 | | | | | | | | | | | | | | | | | | | | | | | | | | | | | | | | | | | | | | | | | | | | 14 | | | | | | | | | | | | | | | | | |
| 15 | | | | | | | | | | | | | | | | | | | | | | | | | | | | | | | | | | | | | | | | | | | | | | | | | | | | | | | | | | | | | |
| 16 | | | | | | | | | | | | | | | | | | | | | | | | | | | | | | | | | | | | | | | | | | | | | | | | | | | | | | | | | | | | | |

• Total: Rosenborg 44 times higher, Molde 13 times higher.
