= Sven Kloster =

Norwegian footballer (born 1970)

Personal information
- Date of birth: 24 August 1970 (age 56)
- Position: Defender

Youth career
- Kvinesdal

Senior career*
Years	Team	Apps	(Gls)
1986–1994	Kvinesdal		
1995–2001	Start	123	(10)
2002–?	Kvinesdal		
- * Club domestic league appearances and goals

Sven Kloster (born 24 August 1970) is a Norwegian former professional footballer who played as a defender. He played 123 league games and 9 cup games for IK Start, spending the years 1995, 1996 and 2000 in the highest league in Norway.

== Career ==
Kloster is from Liknes in Kvinesdal Municipality, and started his youth career in Kvinesdal IL. He became a part of their senior squad at the age of 15, playing as a striker at the time. His first senior goal came in the 1986 Norwegian Fourth Division against SK Stag–with Kloster scoring for five different teams in 1986: Kvinesdal's senior team, the senior B team, the U19 team, the U16 team and Agder's district team. In 1986 he also enrolled in Flekkefjord Upper Secondary School.

The team chased promotion to the third tier of Norwegian football, but Sven Kloster experienced a third place in 1986, second places in 1987, 1988 and 1989, third places in 1990 and 1991, and second places in 1992 and 1993. (The fourth tier changed its name to the Third Division in 1992.) The 1994 campaign ended in yet another second place.

After the 1994 season, Kloster ended his long career in Kvinesdal, and instead joined the largest team in the region, IK Start. Kloster was the first player from Kvinesdal to play for IK Start. When taking the step directly from the fourth to the first tier, Kloster mainly had to improve physically. On the other hand, coach Erik Ruthford Pedersen saw Kloster's technique as his main strength. Having played as forward, but also as a sweeper during his time in Kvinesdal, Kloster now envisioned being a midfielder as Start lost both Tommy Svindal Larsen and Erik Mykland.

He was repurposed as a defender as Start spent the years 1997 through 1999 on the second tier. In 1998, Kloster scored an important goal as Start beat Ullern 1–0 away, and also took several set pieces. Among others, he converted two free kicks in the 1998 cup, one of them settling the match against Lyngdal IL, his old rival team from Kvinesdal. Other times, he took the free kick as a "Start flick", a maneuver named for his team, which entails the free kick taker slightly flicking the ball into the air, whereupon a teammate strikes the ball on a volley.

In 1999, he played every league match as Start won promotion. Start had to go through the two-legged promotion playoff, and in the first leg, Kloster converted a penalty. The ball struck the post and went in off of the back of the opposing goalkeeper. Finally returning to Eliteserien in 2000, Kloster was considered for the right back position. The manager at the time, Jan Halvor Halvorsen, saw Kloster's main strengths as his passing and his view for passing opportunities.

After being relegated in 2000 and winning promotion in 2001, Start found themselves in a financial quagmire and wanted to terminate the contracts of several players, including Kloster. Following various negotiations, most of the Start players agreed to a pay cut; some were sold, whereas Start paid Kloster out of his remaining contract. He later featured for Kvinesdal again.

== Personal life ==
His favourite English team was Liverpool. In 2009 he was selected for an exhibition match between IK Start oldtimers against a team of Liverpool oldtimers including the likes of Bruce Grobbelaar, Jan Mølby, Phil Neal and Michael Thomas. Kloster took up golf as a hobby.

In December 2006 he married Lena Rannestad in the Norwegian Seamen's Church in Gran Canaria. Whilst she was from Moi, the couple settled in Kvinesdal. She embarked on a career as a politician, serving as deputy mayor of Kvinesdal Municipality.
