= Kjell Roar Kaasa =

Norwegian footballer (born 1966)

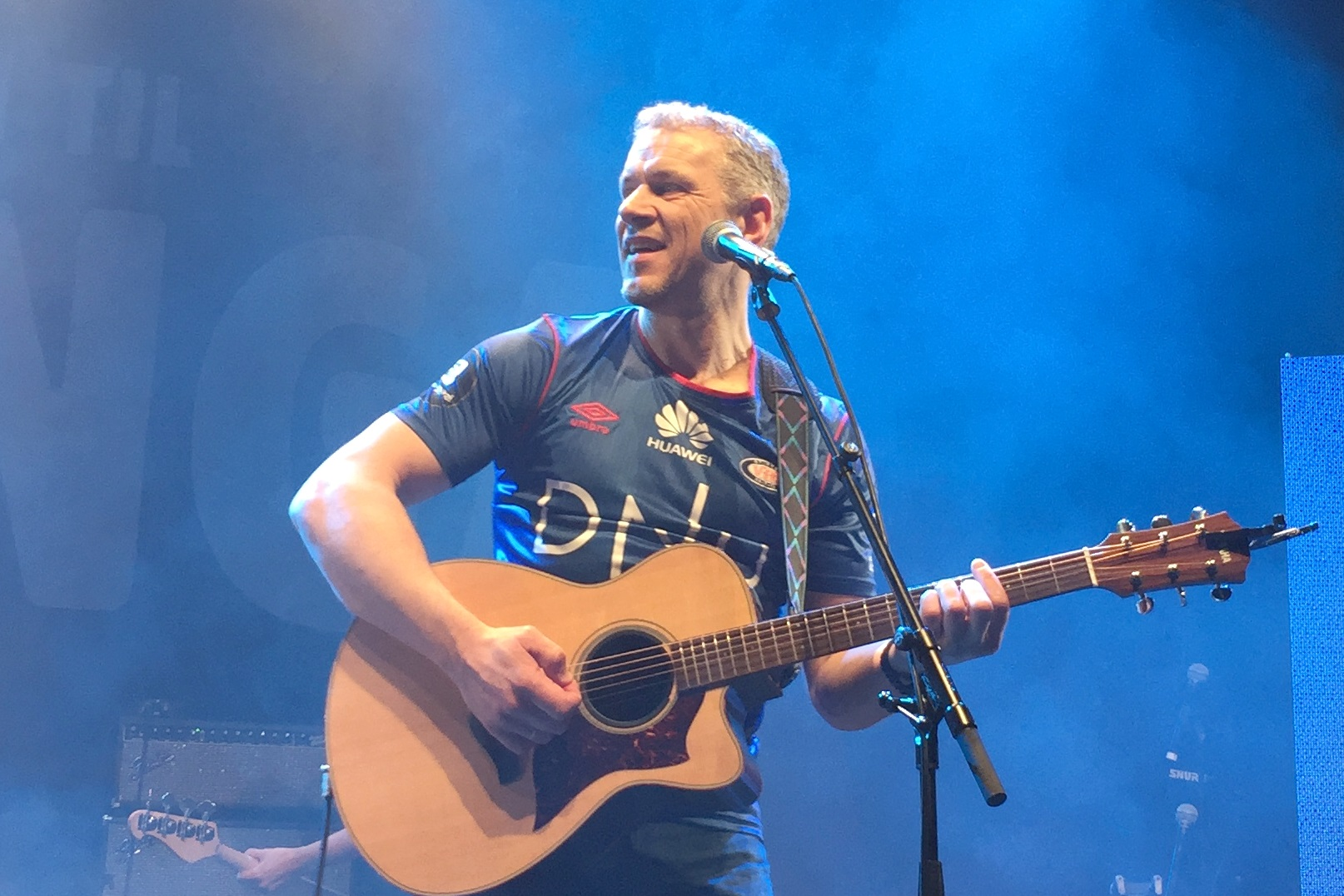
Kjell Roar Kaasa

Kjell Roar Kaasa (born 15 March 1966) is a Norwegian retired professional footballer who played as a striker.

Kaasa's clubs include Drangedal, Kjosen, Bøler, Skeid, Kongsvinger, Lyn, Rosenborg, Stabæk, Vålerenga, Follo and Manglerud Star.

== Career statistics ==
Appearances and goals by club, season and competition
Season	Club	League			National Cup		League Cup		Europe		Total	
Season	Club	Division	Apps	Goals	Apps	Goals	Apps	Goals	Apps	Goals	Apps	Goals
Kongsvinger	1992	Tippeligaen	20	17	3	6	—		—		23	23
Lyn	1993	Tippeligaen	21	13	0	0	—		—		21	13
Rosenborg	1994	Tippeligaen	22	6	2	3	—		—		24	9
Stabæk	1995	Tippeligaen	23	8	0	0	—		—		23	8
Stabæk	1996	Tippeligaen	26	8	0	0	—		—		26	8
Stabæk	Total		49	16	0	0	0	0	0	0	49	16
Vålerenga	1997	First Division	24	9	0	0	—		—		24	9
Vålerenga	1998	Tippeligaen	21	7	0	0	—		—		21	7
Vålerenga	1999	Tippeligaen	0	0	2	0	—		—		2	0
Vålerenga	Total		45	16	2	0	0	0	0	0	47	16
Lyn	1999	First Division	17	13	3	3	—		—		20	16
Lyn	2000	First Division	13	2	1	2	—		—		14	4
Lyn	Total		30	15	4	5	0	0	0	0	34	20
Career total			187	83	11	14	0	0	0	0	198	97

== Honours ==
- Tippeligaen top scorer: |1992 (17 goals)
