= 1977 Norwegian First Division =

33rd season of top-tier football league in Norway

1. divisjon
- Season: 1977
- Dates: 25 April – 16 October
- Champions: Lillestrøm; 3rd title
- Relegated: Ham Kam; Rosenborg; Mjøndalen
- European Cup: Lillestrøm
- Cup Winners' Cup: Bodø/Glimt
- UEFA Cup: Molde; Start
- Matches played: 132
- Goals scored: 396 (3 per match)
- Top goalscorer: Trygve Johannessen (17 goals)
- Biggest home win: Start 5–0 Mjøndalen (2 October 1977); Start 6–1 HamKam (16 October 1977)
- Biggest away win: Vålerengen 0–4 Lillestrøm (25 April 1977); Moss 0–4 Viking (1 May 1977); Start 0–4 Vålerengen (19 June 1977); Moss 0–4 Lillestrøm (10 September 1977); Rosenborg 2–6 HamKam (26 September 1977)
- Highest scoring: Brann 6–3 HamKam (15 August 1977)
- Longest winning run: Lillestrøm (6 games)
- Longest unbeaten run: Lillestrøm (17 games)
- Longest winless run: Rosenborg (17 games)
- Longest losing run: Mjøndalen; Rosenborg; Vålerenga (5 games)
- Highest attendance: 22,150; Brann 0–1 Bodø/Glimt (25 April 1977)
- Lowest attendance: 1,890; Mjøndalen 0–0 Rosenborg (9 October 1977)
- Average attendance: 7,339 ▲13.1%

The 1977 1. divisjon was the 33rd completed season of top division football in Norway.

== Overview ==
There were 12 teams in the division. Lillestrøm SK emerged as the championship victors, their third league title. Lillestrøm's 36 points was at the time a record for most points in a season, two more than Viking and Fredrikstad achieved in the 1972 season.

== Teams and locations ==
Note: Table lists in alphabetical order.

Team	Ap.	Location	Stadium
Bodø/Glimt	1	Bodø	Aspmyra Stadion
Brann	25	Bergen	Brann Stadion
Bryne	2	Bryne	Bryne Stadion
Hamarkameratene	8	Hamar	Briskeby
Lillestrøm	14	Lillestrøm	Åråsen Stadion
Mjøndalen	11	Mjøndalen	Nedre Eiker Stadion
Molde	6	Molde	Molde Stadion
Moss	4	Moss	Melløs Stadion
Rosenborg	15	Trondheim	Lerkendal Stadion
Start	10	Kristiansand	Kristiansand Stadion
Vålerengen	22	Oslo	Bislett Stadion
Viking	30	Stavanger	Stavanger Stadion

== League table ==
Pos	Team	Pld	W	D	L	GF	GA	GD	Pts	Qualification or relegation
1	Lillestrøm (C)	22	16	4	2	42	11	+31	36	Qualification for the European Cup first round
2	Bodø/Glimt	22	10	8	4	33	24	+9	28	Qualification for the Cup Winners' Cup first round
3	Molde	22	12	3	7	31	28	+3	27	Qualification for the UEFA Cup first round
4	Start	22	9	7	6	37	30	+7	25	Qualification for the UEFA Cup first round
5	Viking	22	9	5	8	41	34	+7	23	
6	Brann	22	8	6	8	40	35	+5	22	
7	Vålerengen	22	8	4	10	37	37	0	20	
8	Bryne	22	6	8	8	36	36	0	20	
9	Moss	22	7	6	9	28	39	−11	20	
10	Hamarkameratene (R)	22	6	6	10	37	42	−5	18	Relegation to Second Division
11	Mjøndalen (R)	22	7	4	11	17	32	−15	18	Relegation to Second Division
12	Rosenborg (R)	22	1	5	16	17	48	−31	7	Relegation to Second Division

Source: NIFS
Rules for classification: 1) points; 2) goal difference; 3) number of goals scored.
(C) Champions; (R) Relegated

== Results ==
Home \ Away	B/G	BRA	BRY	HAM	LIL	MIF	MOL	MOS	ROS	IKS	VIK	VÅL
Bodø/Glimt	—	2–2	0–2	2–0	1–1	0–1	4–1	3–1	0–0	1–0	1–0	1–1
Brann	0–1	—	1–1	6–3	2–1	2–0	1–2	1–1	4–0	4–1	1–1	1–1
Bryne	2–3	4–2	—	1–1	2–0	1–3	1–3	1–1	4–2	2–2	2–2	4–1
Hamarkameratene	1–1	0–2	2–2	—	0–1	4–0	1–0	4–2	3–2	0–1	1–2	0–1
Lillestrøm	3–1	3–1	1–1	2–1	—	4–0	3–0	4–0	1–0	1–0	3–1	1–0
Mjøndalen	1–2	0–0	2–0	2–2	0–1	—	0–1	1–2	0–0	0–0	3–1	1–0
Molde	0–1	1–0	2–2	1–0	0–0	2–0	—	3–1	2–0	0–0	3–2	4–1
Moss	1–0	1–0	1–0	2–2	0–4	2–0	2–3	—	2–2	1–1	0–4	0–1
Rosenborg	1–3	1–3	0–2	2–6	0–0	0–1	2–0	1–3	—	1–3	1–3	0–3
Start	3–3	3–1	1–0	6–1	0–2	5–0	1–2	1–1	2–1	—	2–1	0–4
Viking	2–2	3–4	2–1	1–1	1–2	2–0	2–1	3–2	0–0	2–3	—	5–1
Vålerengen	1–1	5–2	4–1	3–4	0–4	1–2	4–0	0–2	3–1	2–2	0–1	—

Source: nifs.no (in Norwegian)
Legend: Blue = home team win; Yellow = draw; Red = away team win.

== Season statistics ==
=== Top scorer ===
- (Norway) Trygve Johannessen, Viking – 17 goals

=== Attendances ===
Pos	Team	Total	High	Low	Average	Change
1	Brann	164,402	22,150	9,975	14,946	+5.8%
2	Vålerengen	108,182	19,127	4,399	9,835	n/a^{2}
3	Lillestrøm	92,725	12,515	5,785	8,430	+32.8%
4	Viking	88,747	12,140	5,858	8,068	−7.7%
5	Bodø/Glimt	84,316	9,652	5,672	7,665	n/a^{2}
6	Start	78,453	12,666	3,847	7,132	+8.7%
7	Bryne	69,110	12,236	4,012	6,283	+26.2%
8	Moss	63,384	7,583	3,715	5,762	n/a^{2}
9	Rosenborg	61,120	8,200	2,200	5,556	−16.7%
10	Molde	60,592	10,700	3,715	5,508	+53.6%
11	HamKam	52,130	7,948	3,025	4,739	−2.8%
12	Mjøndalen	45,522	8,022	1,890	4,138	−18.6%
	League total	968,683	22,150	1,890	7,339	+13.1%

Source: nifs.no
Notes:
2: Team played last season in 2. divisjon.
