= Dørum =

Dørum is a surname. Notable people with the surname include:

- Anneliese Dørum (1939–2000), Norwegian politician
- Aslak Dørum (born 1964), Norwegian writer and bassist
- Knut Dørum Lillebakk (born 1978), Norwegian footballer
- Odd Einar Dørum (born 1943), Norwegian politician
- Reidar Dørum (1925–2014), Norwegian footballer
