= Reidar Dørum =

Norwegian footballer (1925–2014)

Reidar "Tippen" Dørum (3 October 1925 – 16 December 2014) was a Norwegian footballer.

Dørum played for FK Ørn Horten for fifteen seasons between 1945 and 1966, except for a hiatus of six seasons from 1950 because of illness. He scored 250 goals in 150 official games, and became top goalscorer in the 1949–50 Hovedserien with twelve goals.

Outside sport he worked at Karljohansverns Verft. He died in December 2014.

== Honours ==
Individual

- Norwegian top division top scorer: 1949–50
