= Roar Strand =

Norwegian footballer (born 1970)

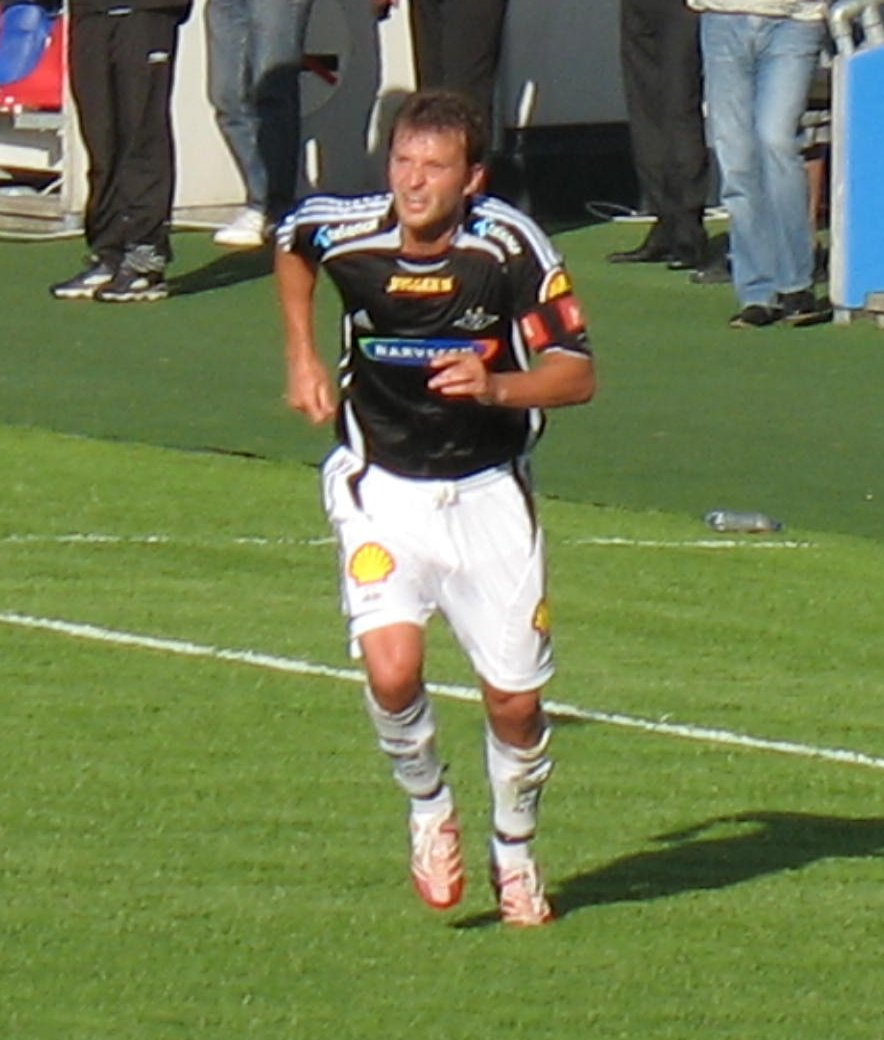
- Strand at Rosenborg

Personal information
- Date of birth: 2 February 1970 (age 56)
- Place of birth: Trondheim, Norway
- Height: 1.79 m (5 ft 10 in)
- Position: Midfielder

Senior career*
Years	Team	Apps	(Gls)
1989–2010	Rosenborg	645	(121)
1993	→ Molde (loan)	23	(9)
2013–2015	Mosvik	11	(4)
2016	Melhus	14	(8)
Total		693	(142)

International career
1994–2003	Norway	42	(4)

Managerial career
- 2022–2023: Rosenborg (assistant)
- * Club domestic league appearances and goals

Roar Strand (born 2 February 1970) is a Norwegian former professional footballer who played as a midfielder, mostly for Rosenborg. Strand was capped 42 times for the Norway national team. He is the player with the fourth-highest number of appearances in the Norwegian top division. He has won 16 league titles, more than any other player in history and the Norwegian Football Cup five times, and he has scored goals in 21 consecutive top flight seasons.

== Club career ==
Strand was born in Trondheim and played for Rosenborg his whole career, except for the 1993 season when he was loaned out to Molde FK, from he made his debut in 1989 till he retired in 2010. He mostly played as midfielder but as an allrounder he also played as winger and wingback.

Strand won the Norwegian top division 16 times (11 consecutive) as well as the Norwegian Football Cup five times with Rosenborg. He participated in the UEFA Champions League 11 times with Rosenborg and played 71 Champions League matches and 100 matches including the qualification matches. He is third on the list of most appearances in the Norwegian Premier Division.

Respected among players, fans of other Norwegian clubs as well as Rosenborg fans for only playing within Norway, the number 6 jersey he used in Rosenborg was retired in his honor. This is the only time Rosenborg has retired a jersey number.

Roar Strand has played over 400 matches in the Norwegian Tippeliga. Match number 400 was against HamKam on Sunday 21 September 2008. Sunday 19 April 2009 he played match number 600 for Rosenborg BK. That includes Norwegian top division, Norwegian Cup, European cups and Royal League.

Strand shares a European record with Manchester United's Ryan Giggs of scoring in 21 consecutive top flight seasons. That equals Pelé, but is behind Romario, who scored in 23 consecutive seasons.

Strand is one of only 19 players in Champions League history to have made 100 or more appearances in the competition for the same club.

== International career ==
Strand played for various youth teams between 1986 and 1989 before he was called up to the Norway U21 national team in 1990, where he played ten games and scored six goals.

In 1994, he was called up to the senior national team's squad for the 1994 World Cup in the United States, but he did not play. His debut came on 5 June in a 2–0 loss against Sweden in the preparation for the World Cup.

Strand played in the 1998 World Cup in France and in the 2000 European Football Championship in Belgium and the Netherlands. He retired from the national team in 2003, despite pressure for him to carry on.

He played 42 games and scored four goals for Norway.

== Career statistics ==
As of 1 November 2009

Appearances and goals by club, season and competition
Club	Season	League			Norwegian Cup		Continental		Total	
Club	Season	Division	Apps	Goals	Apps	Goals	Apps	Goals	Apps	Goals
Rosenborg	1989	Tippeligaen	12	0	2	0	1	0	15	0
Rosenborg	1990	Tippeligaen	19	6	6	0	2	0	27	6
Rosenborg	1991	Tippeligaen	22	3	4	0	2	1	28	4
Rosenborg	1992	Tippeligaen	17	1	3	1	1	0	21	2
Rosenborg	1994	Tippeligaen	22	6	5	1	4	2	31	9
Rosenborg	1995	Tippeligaen	23	4	8	0	8	2	39	6
Rosenborg	1996	Tippeligaen	23	3	3	0	10	1	36	4
Rosenborg	1997	Tippeligaen	23	2	3	1	8	4	34	7
Rosenborg	1998	Tippeligaen	23	12	4	2	8	1	35	15
Rosenborg	1999	Tippeligaen	13	4	3	0	12	1	28	5
Rosenborg	2000	Tippeligaen	17	5	1	0	10	3	28	8
Rosenborg	2001	Tippeligaen	25	8	2	2	8	1	35	11
Rosenborg	2002	Tippeligaen	19	2	3	0	7	0	29	2
Rosenborg	2003	Tippeligaen	18	2	5	4	7	1	30	7
Rosenborg	2004	Tippeligaen	23	4	4	1	10	1	37	6
Rosenborg	2005	Tippeligaen	23	4	2	2	9	1	34	7
Rosenborg	2006	Tippeligaen	18	3	5	0	-	-	23	3
Rosenborg	2007	Tippeligaen	19	2	1	1	9	0	30	3
Rosenborg	2008	Tippeligaen	20	4	1	1	7	0	29	5
Rosenborg	2009	Tippeligaen	22	1	2	0	2	0	26	1
Rosenborg	2010	Tippeligaen	15	3	2	0	2	0	16	3
Molde (loan)	1993	Tippeligaen	23	9	6	2	-	-	29	11
Career total			439	88	75	18	127	19	642	125

== Honours ==
Rosenborg

- Norwegian top division (16): 1990, 1992, 1994, 1995, 1996, 1997, 1998, 1999, 2000, 2001, 2002, 2003, 2004, 2006, 2009, 2010
- Norwegian Cup: 1990, 1992, 1995, 1999, 2003

Individual

- Kniksen award as midfielder of the year in 1998
- Kniksen's Honorary Award in 2001
- Norwegian Football Association Gold Watch
