= 1972 Norwegian First Division =

28th season of top-tier football league in Norway

1. divisjon
- Season: 1972
- Dates: 23 April – 15 October
- Champions: Viking; 2nd title
- Relegated: Sarpsborg FK; Hødd; Mjølner
- European Cup: Viking
- Cup Winners' Cup: Brann
- UEFA Cup: Fredrikstad; Strømsgodset
- Matches played: 132
- Goals scored: 306 (2.32 per match)
- Top goalscorer: Egil Solberg; Johannes Vold (16 goals)
- Biggest home win: Strømsgodset 9–3 Fredrikstad (11 May 1972)
- Biggest away win: Mjøndalen 1–4 Viking (11 June 1972); Mjølner 0–3 Strømsgodset (1 July 1972); HamKam 0–3 Viking (27 August 1972); Mjølner 0–3 Lyn (8 October 1972)
- Highest scoring: Strømsgodset 9–3 Fredrikstad (11 May 1972)
- Longest winning run: Viking (7 games)
- Longest unbeaten run: Strømsgodset (11 games)
- Longest winless run: Hødd; Mjølner; Sarpsborg FK (7 games)
- Longest losing run: Mjølner; Mjøndalen (5 games)
- Highest attendance: 14,160; Viking 2–0 Rosenborg (19 June 1972)
- Lowest attendance: 1,000; Hødd 0–1 Skeid (15 October 1972)
- Average attendance: 5,636 ▼14.3%

The 1972 1. divisjon was the 28th completed season of top division football in Norway.

== Overview ==
It was contested by 12 teams, and Viking FK won the championship, their second league title.

== Teams and locations ==
Note: Table lists in alphabetical order.

| Team | Ap. | Location | Stadium |
|---|---|---|---|
| Brann | 20 | Bergen | Brann Stadion |
| Fredrikstad | 27 | Fredrikstad | Fredrikstad Stadion |
| HamKam | 4 | Hamar | Briskeby |
| Hødd | 5 | Ulsteinvik | Høddvoll Stadion |
| Lyn | 19 | Oslo | Ullevaal Stadion |
| Mjølner | 1 | Narvik | Narvik Stadion |
| Mjøndalen | 6 | Mjøndalen | Nedre Eiker Stadion |
| Rosenborg | 10 | Trondheim | Lerkendal Stadion |
| Sarpsborg FK | 22 | Sarpsborg | Sarpsborg Stadion |
| Skeid | 25 | Oslo | Bislett Stadion |
| Strømsgodset | 7 | Drammen | Marienlyst Stadion |
| Viking | 25 | Stavanger | Stavanger Stadion |

== League table ==
| Pos | Team | Pld | W | D | L | GF | GA | GD | Pts | Qualification or relegation |
|---|---|---|---|---|---|---|---|---|---|---|
| 1 | Viking (C) | 22 | 16 | 2 | 4 | 42 | 15 | +27 | 34 | Qualification for the European Cup first round |
| 2 | Fredrikstad | 22 | 16 | 2 | 4 | 31 | 16 | +15 | 34 | Qualification for the UEFA Cup first round |
| 3 | Strømsgodset | 22 | 10 | 7 | 5 | 40 | 29 | +11 | 27 | Qualification for the UEFA Cup first round |
| 4 | Rosenborg | 22 | 6 | 10 | 6 | 22 | 19 | +3 | 22 | |
| 5 | Lyn | 22 | 7 | 7 | 8 | 29 | 22 | +7 | 21 | |
| 6 | Skeid | 22 | 8 | 5 | 9 | 26 | 26 | 0 | 21 | |
| 7 | Mjøndalen | 22 | 9 | 3 | 10 | 31 | 36 | −5 | 21 | |
| 8 | Brann | 22 | 7 | 6 | 9 | 22 | 23 | −1 | 20 | Qualification for the Cup Winners' Cup first round |
| 9 | HamKam | 22 | 6 | 8 | 8 | 14 | 18 | −4 | 20 | |
| 10 | Sarpsborg FK (R) | 22 | 6 | 6 | 10 | 21 | 30 | −9 | 18 | Relegation to Second Division |
| 11 | Hødd (R) | 22 | 4 | 6 | 12 | 18 | 39 | −21 | 14 | Relegation to Second Division |
| 12 | Mjølner (R) | 22 | 3 | 6 | 13 | 10 | 33 | −23 | 12 | Relegation to Second Division |

Source: NIFS
Rules for classification: 1) points; 2) goal difference; 3) number of goals scored.
(C) Champions; (R) Relegated

== Results ==
| Home \ Away | BRA | FRE | HAM | HØD | LYN | FKM | MIF | ROS | SRP | SKE | STM | VIK |
|---|---|---|---|---|---|---|---|---|---|---|---|---|
| Brann | — | 0–1 | 1–0 | 1–1 | 0–0 | 2–0 | 3–0 | 0–0 | 3–0 | 0–1 | 1–1 | 1–2 |
| Fredrikstad | 1–0 | — | 0–0 | 4–1 | 2–0 | 1–0 | 4–0 | 0–1 | 1–0 | 2–0 | 0–1 | 1–0 |
| HamKam | 3–1 | 0–1 | — | 0–1 | 1–0 | 0–0 | 1–2 | 1–1 | 0–0 | 2–0 | 1–1 | 0–3 |
| Hødd | 1–2 | 2–1 | 0–0 | — | 0–0 | 0–0 | 1–3 | 0–0 | 1–1 | 0–1 | 2–3 | 1–3 |
| Lyn | 0–1 | 0–0 | 0–0 | 3–0 | — | 1–1 | 1–1 | 0–0 | 5–1 | 1–3 | 5–1 | 2–3 |
| Mjølner | 0–1 | 1–2 | 0–0 | 1–3 | 0–3 | — | 3–0 | 2–2 | 1–0 | 1–0 | 0–3 | 0–1 |
| Mjøndalen | 4–2 | 1–2 | 2–0 | 2–0 | 3–2 | 3–0 | — | 2–2 | 2–0 | 0–1 | 3–0 | 1–4 |
| Rosenborg | 2–0 | 0–2 | 0–1 | 0–1 | 1–0 | 2–0 | 3–0 | — | 0–1 | 2–0 | 1–1 | 1–1 |
| Sarpsborg | 1–0 | 0–1 | 3–1 | 4–0 | 1–2 | 2–0 | 2–2 | 1–1 | — | 3–0 | 1–1 | 0–1 |
| Skeid | 2–2 | 0–1 | 0–2 | 4–1 | 1–2 | 5–0 | 2–0 | 2–2 | 0–0 | — | 1–1 | 1–0 |
| Strømsgodset | 1–1 | 9–3 | 0–1 | 2–1 | 1–2 | 2–0 | 1–0 | 2–1 | 4–0 | 1–1 | — | 3–1 |
| Viking | 2–0 | 0–1 | 2–0 | 4–1 | 1–0 | 0–0 | 2–0 | 2–0 | 4–0 | 3–1 | 3–1 | — |

Source: nifs.no (in Norwegian)
Legend: Blue = home team win; Yellow = draw; Red = away team win.

== Season statistics ==
=== Top scorers ===
- (Norway) Egil Solberg, Mjøndalen – 16 goals
- (Norway) Johannes Vold, Viking – 16 goals

=== Attendances ===
| Pos | Team | Total | High | Low | Average | Change |
|---|---|---|---|---|---|---|
| 1 | Viking | 123,400 | 14,160 | 6,319 | 11,218 | +9.0% |
| 2 | Brann | 95,300 | 12,900 | 6,300 | 8,664 | +12.4% |
| 3 | Strømsgodset | 83,690 | 10,600 | 5,600 | 7,608 | −12.5% |
| 4 | Rosenborg | 74,892 | 9,400 | 3,734 | 6,808 | −19.3% |
| 5 | Fredrikstad | 61,774 | 9,225 | 2,700 | 5,616 | −8.5% |
| 6 | Skeid | 54,572 | 9,985 | 2,771 | 4,961 | n/a^{2} |
| 7 | Mjøndalen | 49,950 | 6,800 | 1,900 | 4,541 | n/a^{2} |
| 8 | Lyn | 46,876 | 6,900 | 2,022 | 4,261 | −46.5% |
| 9 | HamKam | 43,300 | 6,000 | 2,071 | 3,936 | −12.8% |
| 10 | Sarpsborg FK | 41,519 | 9,200 | 1,667 | 3,774 | −8.2% |
| 11 | Mjølner | 40,593 | 6,143 | 1,500 | 3,690 | n/a^{2} |
| 12 | Hødd | 28,100 | 4,100 | 1,000 | 2,555 | −22.3% |
| | League total | 743,966 | 14,160 | 1,000 | 5,636 | −14.3% |

Source: nifs.no
Notes:
2: Team played last season in 2. divisjon.
