= Hans Andersen (footballer, born 1939) =

Danish footballer

Personal information
- Date of birth: 12 March 1939 (age 87)
- Position: Midfielder

Senior career*
Years	Team	Apps	(Gls)
1958–1972	Køge BK	267	(62)

International career
1963	Denmark	1	(0)
- * Club domestic league appearances and goals

Hans Andersen (born 12 March 1939) is a Danish former footballer who played as a midfielder for Køge BK and the Danish national team.
