= Trygve Johannessen =

Norwegian footballer (born 1953)

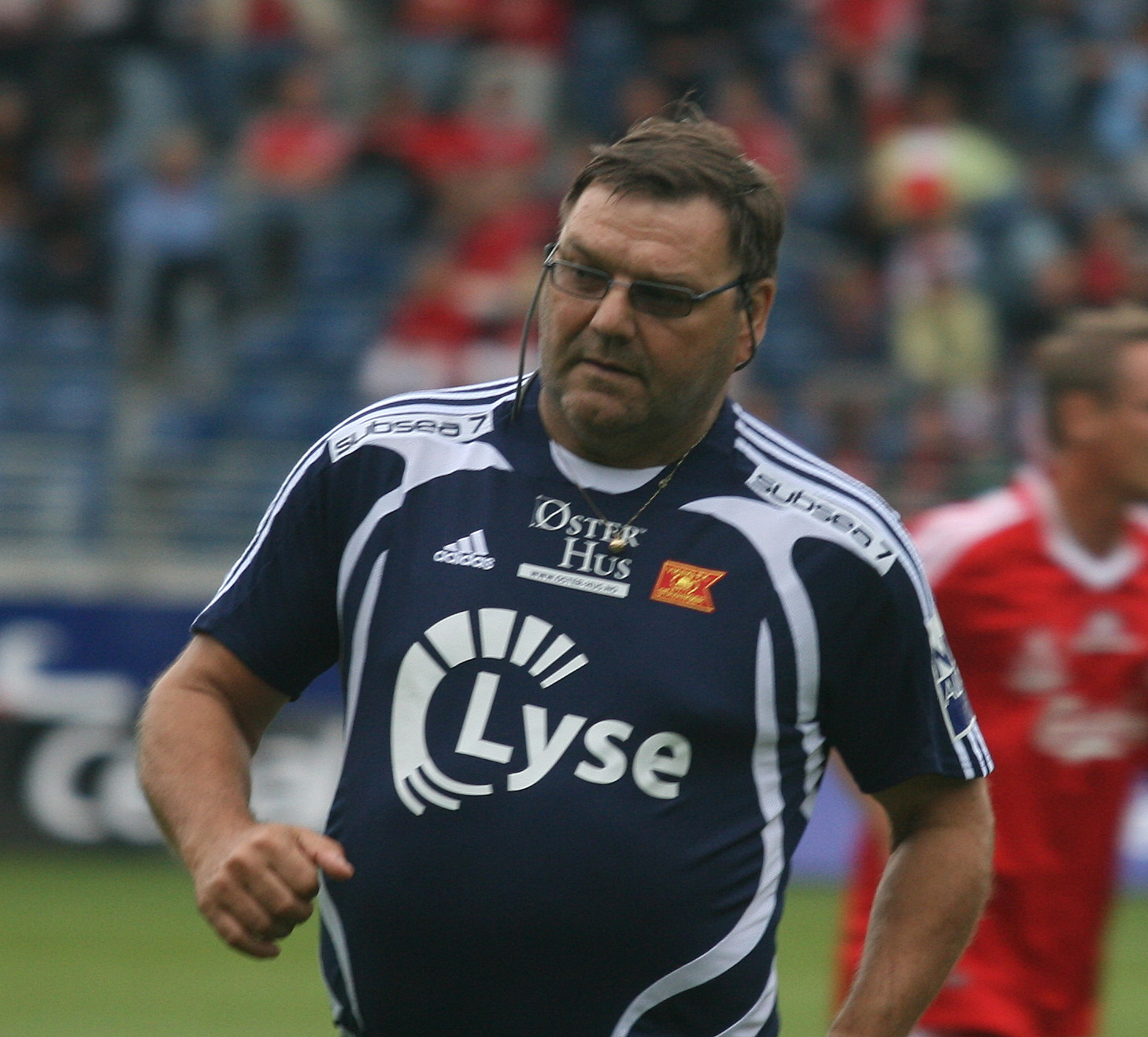
- Johannesen in 2008

Personal information
- Date of birth: 11 January 1953 (age 73)
- Place of birth: Askøy Municipality, Norway
- Position: Forward

Senior career*
Years	Team	Apps	(Gls)
1971–1973	Florvåg IF		
1974–1980	Viking	134	(55)
1981	FK Vidar		
1982	Viking	21	(0)
1983–1984	Vidar		
1984–85	Brann	32	(15)
1986–1986	Florvåg IF		

International career
1971	Norway U19	2	(0)
1973–1974	Norway U21	7	(1)
1975–1979	Norway	5	(0)
- * Club domestic league appearances and goals

Trygve Johannessen (born 11 January 1953) is a Norwegian former professional footballer who played as a forward. He is best known for his time at Viking, with whom he won four league titles and one cup between 1974 and 1982. He scored a total of 181 goals in 312 games for Viking (these numbers include friendlies).

== Career ==
Johannessen had many youth caps when he moved from Florvåg IF to Viking in the summer of 1974. Viking paid somewhat less than 40,000 kr for the player, at a time when money was seen as taboo in Norwegian football. Johannessen played well to hold his place in the team, and was for many years Viking's top scorer. He became top goalscorer in the first division with 17 goals in 1977 and 11 goals in 1982.

After a couple of seasons in the reserves at Viking, Johannessen was sold to neighbours Vidar in 1981. Here he was an unrivalled success. In the course of a season, he scored 56 goals and helped Vidar to promotion to the Second Division. In 1982, he returned to Viking. He won his fifth title with the club and together with Ham-Kam's Tor Arne Granerud he was top scorer with eleven goals.

In 1983, he returned to Vidar again, where he stayed for two seasons. Over his three seasons with Vidar, Johannessen played 109 games and scored 124 goals (including friendlies). In his first ten years of his career, Johannessen scored a total of 305 goals for the two Stavanger clubs. In 1985, he played one season for Brann and scored eleven league goals.

Johannessen finished his football career in Florvåg IF, where he started it. He later became manager of many local clubs, such as Florvåg, Løv-Ham, Follese FK and Askøy FK.

Johannessen won five caps and seven youth caps. He made his international debut with the Norway national team against the Soviet Union on 24 September 1975. His other caps were Olympic qualifying matches in 1979.
