= Gunnar Thoresen =

Norwegian footballer (1920–2017)

Personal information
- Full name: Gunnar Nils Thoresen
- Date of birth: 21 July 1920
- Place of birth: Larvik, Norway
- Date of death: 30 September 2017 (aged 97)
- Place of death: Larvik, Norway
- Position: Forward

Senior career*
Years	Team	Apps	(Gls)
1937–1962	Larvik Turn	261	(230)

International career
1946–1959	Norway	64	(22)
- * Club domestic league appearances and goals

Gunnar Nils Thoresen (21 July 1920 – 30 September 2017) was one of the greatest Norwegian footballers of the 1940s and 1950s. A forward, played 64 matches and scored 22 goals for the Norway national team and took part in the 1952 Summer Olympics. His last appearance for Norway came on 28 June 1959, less than a month before his 39th birthday, making him the oldest-ever Norwegian player to play for his national team.

On club level Thoresen spent his entire career with Larvik Turn. He made his first-team debut for the club on 17 May 1937, in a match against Lisleby. His career was interrupted by World War II, but quickly established himself among the best players in Norway when organized football resumed in 1945, and made his international debut against Denmark on 16 June 1946.

Thoresen was in Larvik Turn when they became league champions: 1952–53, 1954–55 and 1955–56. In addition he won the top scorer title twice. He scored 91 goals in 116 matches in his Norwegian top division career, an average of 0.78 goals per match. He appeared in his last match for Larvik Turn in 1962, having a career total of 425 goals in 472 first-team matches for the club (including friendlies). This makes him the highest-scoring Norwegian footballer of all-time.

Thoresen is the father of Hallvar Thoresen, who became a Norwegian international footballer, appeared for the Netherlands teams FC Twente and PSV Eindhoven, and was regarded in the 1980s as one of Norway's best players. Gunnar was capped 64 times, while Hallvar was to appear in 50 internationals, making them Norway's second-most capped father-son combination, following Odd and Steffen Iversen who were capped a combined 124 times.

Gunnar Thoresen died on 30 September 2017, at the age of 97.

== Honours ==
Larvik Turn

- Norwegian top division: 1952–53, 1954–55, 1955–56

Individual

- Norwegian top division top scorer: 1952–53, 1953–54
