= André Herfindal =

Norwegian footballer (born 1977)

André Herfindal (born 4 May 1977) is a Norwegian former professional footballer who played as a defender.

Born in Bergen, He played two cup-matches for Brann in 1995. His other clubs were Ny-Krohnborg, Sogndal, Åsane and Mandalskameratene. He captained the latter club for a couple of seasons.

In 2000, he scored a goal for Sogndal in the promotion play-offs to the Norwegian Premier League which sent Vålerenga into the Adeccoligaen.
