= 1998 Tippeligaen =

54th season of top-tier football league in Norway

Tippeligaen
- Season: 1998
- Dates: 13 April – 25 October
- Champions: Rosenborg; 13th title
- Relegated: Sogndal; Haugesund
- Champions League: Rosenborg; Molde
- UEFA Cup: Stabæk; Viking; Bodø/Glimt
- Intertoto Cup: Vålerenga
- Matches: 182
- Goals: 671 (3.69 per match)
- Top goalscorer: Sigurd Rushfeldt (27 goals)
- Biggest home win: Rosenborg 6–0 Moss (16 May 1998); Rosenborg 7–1 Strømsgodset (19 July 1998)
- Biggest away win: Sogndal 0–9 Stabæk (25 October 1998)
- Highest scoring: Kongsvinger 2–8 Rosenborg (9 September 1998)
- Highest attendance: 21,230; Rosenborg 6–0 Moss (16 May 1998)
- Lowest attendance: 841; Sogndal 0–9 Stabæk (25 October 1998)
- Average attendance: 5,267 ▲11.2%

The 1998 Tippeligaen was the 54th completed season of top division football in Norway. Each team played 26 games with 3 points given for wins and 1 for draws. Number thirteen and fourteen are relegated, number twelve has to play two qualification matches (home and away) against number three in the first division (where number one and two are directly promoted) for the last spot.

== Teams and locations ==
Note: Table lists in alphabetical order.

Team	Ap.	Location	Stadium
Bodø/Glimt	10	Bodø	Aspmyra Stadion
Brann	42	Bergen	Brann Stadion
Haugesund	2	Haugesund	Haugesund Stadion
Kongsvinger	16	Kongsvinger	Gjemselund Stadion
Lillestrøm	35	Lillestrøm	Åråsen Stadion
Molde	23	Molde	Nye Molde Stadion
Moss	18	Moss	Melløs Stadion
Rosenborg	35	Trondheim	Lerkendal Stadion
Sogndal	8	Sogndalsfjøra	Fosshaugane
Stabæk	4	Bærum	Nadderud Stadion
Strømsgodset	17	Drammen	Marienlyst Stadion
Tromsø	13	Tromsø	Alfheim Stadion
Vålerenga	39	Oslo	Ullevaal Stadion
Viking	49	Stavanger	Stavanger Stadion

== League table ==
Pos	Team	Pld	W	D	L	GF	GA	GD	Pts	Qualification or relegation
1	Rosenborg (C)	26	20	3	3	79	23	+56	63	Qualification for the Champions League group stage
2	Molde	26	16	6	4	70	34	+36	54	Qualification for the Champions League second qualifying round
3	Stabæk	26	16	5	5	63	29	+34	53	Qualification for the UEFA Cup first round (Note: Stabæk qualified for the UEFA Cup as Norwegian Cup winners.)
4	Viking	26	14	4	8	66	44	+22	46	Qualification for the UEFA Cup qualifying round (Note: Bodø/Glimt qualified for the UEFA Cup qualifying round through their Fair play ranking.)
5	Bodø/Glimt	26	9	9	8	47	47	0	36	Qualification for the UEFA Cup qualifying round
6	Brann	26	9	8	9	44	39	+5	35	Qualification for the Intertoto Cup second round
7	Vålerenga	26	10	3	13	44	48	−4	33	Qualification for the Intertoto Cup first round
8	Lillestrøm	26	9	6	11	41	49	−8	33	
9	Moss	26	10	2	14	36	55	−19	32	
10	Strømsgodset	26	9	5	12	40	61	−21	32	
11	Tromsø	26	7	7	12	39	48	−9	28	
12	Kongsvinger (O)	26	7	5	14	35	59	−24	26	Qualification for the relegation play-offs
13	Haugesund (R)	26	6	5	15	41	55	−14	23	Relegation to First Division
14	Sogndal (R)	26	4	4	18	26	80	−54	16	Relegation to First Division

Source: fotball.no
Rules for classification: 1) points; 2) goal difference; 3) number of goals scored.
(C) Champions; (O) Play-off winners; (R) Relegated

== Relegation play-offs ==
Kongsvinger won the play-offs against Kjelsås 7–2 on aggregate.

28 October 1998
14:00 CET (UTC+1)

Kongsvinger	2–2	Kjelsås
Bergman 30' (pen.); Gullerud 76'	Report	Theting 5'; Skonnord 10'

Gjemselund Stadion, Kongsvinger
Attendance: 2,016
Referee: Terje Hauge

31 October 1998
13:00 CET (UTC+1)

Kjelsås	0–5	Kongsvinger
	Report	Bergman 7', 59'; Alm 49'; Dybendal 78'; Solberg 87'

Grefsen Stadion, Oslo
Attendance: 3,293
Referee: Roy Helge Olsen

== Results ==
Home \ Away	BOD	BRA	HAU	KON	LIL	MOL	MOS	ROS	SOG	STB	STM	TRO	VÅL	VIK
Bodø/Glimt	—	2–2	3–2	0–0	1–1	0–2	2–1	2–6	3–0	1–3	6–2	3–2	2–1	3–1
Brann	2–1	—	2–2	3–0	1–2	2–2	0–1	0–0	4–0	2–0	0–1	3–1	3–0	1–4
Haugesund	5–4	2–3	—	1–1	0–2	2–3	5–1	0–3	4–0	0–1	1–1	1–1	3–1	1–4
Kongsvinger	0–0	2–2	0–1	—	3–0	0–3	2–4	2–8	3–2	1–5	2–1	2–1	1–3	1–1
Lillestrøm	0–0	1–1	5–0	0–3	—	1–1	3–4	0–3	0–1	2–3	2–4	2–1	3–2	2–3
Molde	1–0	2–2	4–1	4–1	4–0	—	6–0	0–2	4–0	1–1	1–3	2–2	4–1	4–4
Moss	0–1	3–0	2–0	2–0	1–2	0–2	—	1–3	1–1	1–0	3–1	3–2	3–2	0–1
Rosenborg	3–0	4–2	1–0	4–0	6–1	1–2	6–0	—	4–0	2–2	7–1	1–1	1–0	3–1
Sogndal	1–2	2–1	0–4	2–5	2–2	1–4	4–3	2–1	—	0–9	2–2	0–0	1–3	1–2
Stabæk	3–2	1–1	1–1	2–1	1–1	1–4	4–0	2–0	5–1	—	4–0	1–0	2–0	4–3
Strømsgodset	2–2	0–2	4–1	1–0	2–3	1–2	2–0	0–2	2–1	2–1	—	3–2	0–5	1–5
Tromsø	4–4	1–0	2–1	3–0	1–0	2–6	0–0	3–4	3–1	0–4	2–2	—	2–1	1–2
Vålerenga	2–2	3–2	3–2	2–3	1–5	3–1	1–0	0–2	4–0	2–0	1–1	1–0	—	2–2
Viking	1–1	2–3	3–1	4–2	0–1	3–1	5–2	1–2	5–1	1–3	4–1	1–2	3–0	—

Source: NIFS (in Norwegian)
Legend: Blue = home team win; Yellow = draw; Red = away team win.

== Season statistics ==
=== Top scorers ===
Rank	Player	Club	Goals
1	(Norway) Sigurd Rushfeldt	Rosenborg	27
2	(Norway) Rune Lange	Tromsø	20
3	(Norway) Petter Belsvik	Stabæk	19
3	(Norway) Jostein Flo	Strømsgodset	19
5	(Norway) Andreas Lund	Molde	16
6	(Iceland) Ríkharður Daðason	Viking	15
7	(Norway) Jahn Ivar "Mini" Jakobsen	Rosenborg	14
8	(Denmark) Christian Flindt Bjerg	Viking	12
8	(Norway) Kjetil Løvvik	Brann	12
8	(Norway) Raymond Kvisvik	Moss/Brann	12
8	(Norway) Roar Strand	Rosenborg	12

=== Attendances ===
Pos	Team	Total	High	Low	Average	Change
1	Rosenborg	171,129	21,230	8,864	13,164	+16.1%
2	Brann	116,693	12,290	7,236	8,976	−20.7%
3	Molde	110,712	13,308	6,036	8,516	+114.8%
4	Vålerenga	102,242	12,318	3,331	7,865	n/a^{1}
5	Viking	73,999	8,126	4,263	5,692	−12.8%
6	Strømsgodset	56,715	6,537	3,309	4,363	−21.7%
7	Haugesund	51,353	5,950	2,391	3,950	−18.2%
8	Lillestrøm	51,133	7,008	2,313	3,933	−3.3%
9	Tromsø	45,700	6,896	1,762	3,515	+9.9%
10	Bodø/Glimt	45,393	5,020	2,263	3,492	+5.0%
11	Stabæk	44,159	7,938	1,523	3,397	−0.4%
12	Moss	37,537	5,139	1,442	2,887	n/a^{1}
13	Kongsvinger	32,567	3,870	1,688	2,505	+2.6%
14	Sogndal	19,336	2,336	841	1,487	−18.8%
	League total	958,668	21,230	841	5,267	+11.2%

Source: nifs.no
Notes:
1: Team played last season in 1. divisjon.
