= Rune Lange =

Norwegian footballer (born 1977)

Personal information
- Date of birth: 24 June 1977 (age 49)
- Place of birth: Tromsø, Norway
- Height: 1.87 m (6 ft 2 in)
- Position: Forward

Youth career
- Fløya

Senior career*
Years	Team	Apps	(Gls)
1993–1994	Fløya	32	(39)
1995–1997	Tromsdalen	54	(30)
1997–2000	Tromsø	72	(50)
2000	Trabzonspor	12	(5)
2001–2006	Club Brugge	108	(52)
2006–2008	Vålerenga	17	(2)
2008	→ Tromsø (loan)	3	(0)
2009	→ Hartlepool United (loan)	3	(1)
2009	Kvik Halden	2	(1)
Total		303	(200)

International career
1997	Norway U20	1	(0)
1998–1999	Norway U21	18	(2)
2004	Norway	1	(0)
- * Club domestic league appearances and goals

Rune Lange (born 24 June 1977) is a Norwegian former professional footballer who played as a striker.

== Career ==
Lange hails from the city of Tromsø and joined the club Fløya at the age of five. As a 17-year-old, he became top scorer in the 3. divisjon (fourth tier) with 33 goals in 22 matches, and then moved on to play for Tromsdalen in the 1. divisjon (2nd tier). Lange stayed with the club for three seasons, during which he experienced a relegation and a season in the 2. divisjon (3rd tier).

During the summer of 1997, Lange signed for Tromsø, which played in the Tippeligaen (first tier). He scored seven goals in 11 matches for Tromsø during his first season, and nearly experienced another relegation, but Tromsø survived after having to play qualification matches. Lange also debuted for the Norway under-20 football team. In 1998, Lange scored 20 goals in 26 matches, and was almost sold to Coventry City. Lange stayed at Tromsø, however, as he could not come to an agreement with Coventry on the contract details. In 1999, Lange become top scorer of the Norwegian top division, scoring 23 goals. Lange also made his debut for the Norway U21s that season.

In 2000, Lange started as a player for Tromsø, but was sold to the Turkish side Trabzonspor in July. Lange only played 14 matches and scored seven goals in Turkey.

In April 2001 he moved to Belgian side Club Brugge, the team where he played until 2006.

In 2004, Lange debuted for the Norway national team, playing against Wales.

In February 2009, Lange signed for Hartlepool United on loan until the end of the 2008-09 season. In his third game for Hartlepool, his shoulder was dislocated. On 13 March 2009, Lange had surgery on his injured shoulder and was scheduled not to return to training for at least six weeks.

In September 2009 he signed for Kvik Halden (in the fourth tier of Norwegian football) until the remainder of the season, making four appearances (two league games and both play-off games).

As of March 2011 he was working as a scout for his former employer, Club Brugge.

== Career statistics ==
Appearances and goals by club, season and competition
Club	Season	League			Cup		Continental		Total	
Club	Season	Division	Apps	Goals	Apps	Goals	Apps	Goals	Apps	Goals
Fløya	1993	3. divisjon	10	6			—			
Fløya	1994	3. divisjon	22	33			—			
Fløya	Total		32	39						
Tromsdalen	1995	1. divisjon	21	4			—			
Tromsdalen	1996	1. divisjon	21	11			—			
Tromsdalen	1997	2. divisjon	12	15			—			
Tromsdalen	Total		54	30						
Tromsø	1997	Tippeligaen	9	4	0	0	4	2	13	6
Tromsø	1998	Tippeligaen	26	20	2	1	—		28	21
Tromsø	1999	Tippeligaen	26	23	5	5	—		31	28
Tromsø	2000	Tippeligaen	11	3	1	1	—		12	4
Tromsø	Total		72	50	8	7	4	2	84	59
Trabzonspor	2000–01	Süper Lig	12	5			—			
Club Brugge	2000–01	Belgian First Division	4	0	0	0	0	0	4	0
Club Brugge	2001–02	Belgian First Division	33	20	6	3	7	4	46	27
Club Brugge	2002–03	Belgian First Division	11	4	0	0	6	2	17	6
Club Brugge	2003–04	Belgian First Division	26	12	6	2	7	3	40	17
Club Brugge	2004–05	Belgian First Division	32	15	6	4	10	3	49	23
Club Brugge	2005–06	Belgian First Division	2	2	0	0	2	0	4	2
Club Brugge	Total		108	53	18	9	32	12	160	75
Vålerenga	2006	Tippeligaen	6	0	1	0	1	0	8	0
Vålerenga	2007	Tippeligaen	11	2	2	0	2	1	15	3
Vålerenga	2008	Tippeligaen	0	0	0	0	—		0	0
Vålerenga	Total		17	2	3	0	3	1	23	3
Tromsø	2008	Tippeligaen	3	0			—		3	0
Hartlepool United	2008–09	League 1	3	1	–				3	1
Career total			300	180						

== Honours ==
Club Brugge

- Belgian First Division: 2002–03, 2004–05
- Belgian Cup: 2001–02, 2003–04
- Belgian Supercup: 2002, 2003, 2004, 2005
