= Johannes Vold =

Norwegian footballer (born 1945)

Personal information
- Date of birth: 12 May 1945 (age 81)
- Position: Striker

Senior career*
Years	Team	Apps	(Gls)
1961–1970	Bryne		
1971–1973	Viking		
1974–1976	Vigrestad		

International career
1962–1963	Norway U19	3	(3)
1973	Norway	3	(1)
- * Club domestic league appearances and goals

Johannes Vold (born 12 May 1945) was a Norwegian football striker.

Playing ten seasons on the second and third tier with Bryne, he was picked up by Viking in 1971. Here he became league champion in 1972 and 1973 and joint top goalscorer in 1972. He represented Norway as a U19 and senior international.
