= Thorleif Larsen =

Norwegian footballer (1916-1975)

Personal information
- Date of birth: 7 December 1916
- Date of death: 21 June 1975 (aged 58)

International career
Years	Team	Apps	(Gls)
1945	Norway	2	(0)

Thorleif Larsen (7 December 1916 – 21 June 1975) was a Norwegian footballer. He played in two matches for the Norway national football team in 1945.
