= Egil Solberg =

Norwegian footballer (born 1949)

Personal information
- Date of birth: 18 April 1949 (age 77)
- Position: Striker

Senior career*
Years	Team	Apps	(Gls)
1969–1982	Mjøndalen		

International career
1972	Norway U21	1	(0)
1973	Norway	1	(0)
- * Club domestic league appearances and goals

Egil Solberg (born 18 April 1949) is a retired Norwegian football striker. He spent his entire career in Mjøndalen, and became league top goalscorer in 1972. Solberg represented Norway as an U21 and senior international.
