= 1999 Tippeligaen =

55th season of top-tier football league in Norway

Tippeligaen
- Season: 1999
- Dates: 10 April – 24 October
- Champions: Rosenborg; 14th title
- Relegated: Strømsgodset; Skeid; Kongsvinger
- Champions League: Rosenborg; Molde
- UEFA Cup: Brann; Lillestrøm; Stabæk
- Intertoto Cup: Vålerenga
- Matches played: 182
- Goals scored: 697 (3.83 per match)
- Top goalscorer: Rune Lange (23 goals)
- Biggest home win: Tromsø 8–2 Skeid (12 September 1999)
- Biggest away win: Skeid 0–6 Moss (9 May 1999); Skeid 1–7 Rosenborg (19 September 1999)
- Highest scoring: Tromsø 8–2 Skeid (12 September 1999)
- Highest attendance: 19,514; Rosenborg 3–1 Strømsgodset (16 May 1999)
- Lowest attendance: 665; Skeid 0–6 Moss (9 May 1999)
- Average attendance: 5,372 ▲2.0%

The 1999 Tippeligaen was the 55th completed season of top division football in Norway.

Each team played 26 games with 3 points given for wins and 1 for draws. Number thirteen and fourteen are relegated, number twelve had to play two qualification matches (home and away) against number three in the 1. divisjon (where number one and two were directly promoted) for the last spot.

== Teams and locations ==
Note: Table lists in alphabetical order.

| Team | Ap. | Location | Stadium |
|---|---|---|---|
| Bodø/Glimt | 11 | Bodø | Aspmyra Stadion |
| Brann | 43 | Bergen | Brann Stadion |
| Kongsvinger | 17 | Kongsvinger | Gjemselund Stadion |
| Lillestrøm | 36 | Lillestrøm | Åråsen Stadion |
| Molde | 24 | Molde | Molde Stadion |
| Moss | 19 | Moss | Melløs Stadion |
| Odd Grenland | 19 | Skien | Odd Stadion |
| Rosenborg | 36 | Trondheim | Lerkendal Stadion |
| Skeid | 34 | Oslo | Voldsløkka Stadion |
| Stabæk | 5 | Bærum | Nadderud Stadion |
| Strømsgodset | 18 | Drammen | Marienlyst Stadion |
| Tromsø | 14 | Tromsø | Alfheim Stadion |
| Vålerenga | 40 | Oslo | Ullevaal Stadion |
| Viking | 50 | Stavanger | Stavanger Stadion |

== League table ==
| Pos | Team | Pld | W | D | L | GF | GA | GD | Pts | Qualification or relegation |
|---|---|---|---|---|---|---|---|---|---|---|
| 1 | Rosenborg (C) | 26 | 18 | 2 | 6 | 75 | 33 | +42 | 56 | Qualification for the Champions League second qualifying round |
| 2 | Molde | 26 | 16 | 2 | 8 | 49 | 37 | +12 | 50 | Qualification for the UEFA Cup first round |
| 3 | Brann | 26 | 16 | 1 | 9 | 45 | 40 | +5 | 49 | Qualification for the UEFA Cup qualifying round (Note: SK Brann qualified as the runner-up of the 1999 Norwegian Football Cup.) |
| 4 | Lillestrøm | 26 | 15 | 3 | 8 | 60 | 41 | +19 | 48 | Qualification for the UEFA Cup qualifying round |
| 5 | Stabæk | 26 | 14 | 4 | 8 | 58 | 49 | +9 | 46 | Qualification for the Intertoto Cup first round |
| 6 | Tromsø | 26 | 13 | 5 | 8 | 70 | 46 | +24 | 44 | |
| 7 | Odd Grenland | 26 | 12 | 3 | 11 | 42 | 48 | −6 | 39 | |
| 8 | Viking | 26 | 11 | 3 | 12 | 51 | 48 | +3 | 36 | |
| 9 | Bodø/Glimt | 26 | 10 | 4 | 12 | 52 | 54 | −2 | 34 | |
| 10 | Moss | 26 | 9 | 2 | 15 | 39 | 46 | −7 | 29 | |
| 11 | Vålerenga | 26 | 8 | 4 | 14 | 40 | 53 | −13 | 28 | |
| 12 | Strømsgodset (R) | 26 | 7 | 3 | 16 | 46 | 68 | −22 | 24 | Qualification for the relegation play-offs |
| 13 | Skeid (R) | 26 | 7 | 2 | 17 | 36 | 75 | −39 | 23 | Relegation to First Division |
| 14 | Kongsvinger (R) | 26 | 6 | 2 | 18 | 34 | 59 | −25 | 20 | Relegation to First Division |

Source: fotball.no
Rules for classification: 1) points; 2) goal difference; 3) number of goals scored.
(C) Champions; (R) Relegated

== Relegation play-offs ==
- Start won the play-offs against Strømsgodset 3–2 on aggregate.
27 October 1999
18:00 CEST (UTC+2)

| Start | 2–2 | Strømsgodset |
|---|---|---|
| Kloster 7' (pen.); Nordseth 62' | Report | Wæhler 45'; Lemsalu 84' |

Kristiansand Stadion, Kristiansand
Attendance: 5,004
Referee: Rune Pedersen

31 October 1999
18:00 CET (UTC+1)

| Strømsgodset | 0–1 | Start |
|---|---|---|
| | Report | Leonardsen 90+2' |

Marienlyst Stadion, Drammen
Attendance: 5,979
Referee: Jonny Ditlefsen

Start won 3–2 on aggregate and was promoted to Tippeligaen. Strømsgodset was relegated to 1. divisjon.

== Results ==
| Home \ Away | BOD | BRA | KON | LIL | MOL | MOS | ODD | ROS | SKD | STB | STM | TRO | VÅL | VIK |
|---|---|---|---|---|---|---|---|---|---|---|---|---|---|---|
| Bodø/Glimt | — | 1–3 | 2–0 | 1–2 | 3–1 | 4–0 | 4–0 | 2–4 | 4–2 | 4–0 | 3–1 | 1–3 | 1–1 | 3–3 |
| Brann | 0–2 | — | 5–4 | 1–3 | 0–1 | 1–0 | 3–0 | 2–1 | 0–1 | 2–3 | 2–2 | 3–1 | 2–1 | 1–0 |
| Kongsvinger | 2–1 | 0–2 | — | 1–1 | 2–3 | 1–0 | 1–0 | 0–1 | 1–2 | 1–3 | 2–4 | 3–1 | 4–0 | 1–3 |
| Lillestrøm | 3–0 | 2–0 | 6–2 | — | 0–1 | 1–0 | 1–2 | 3–2 | 2–1 | 1–2 | 4–2 | 1–2 | 4–1 | 4–1 |
| Molde | 2–1 | 1–3 | 3–2 | 2–0 | — | 3–1 | 1–0 | 0–2 | 3–0 | 0–0 | 3–0 | 4–0 | 4–3 | 3–4 |
| Moss | 4–1 | 0–2 | 3–0 | 1–3 | 0–1 | — | 1–0 | 1–4 | 5–0 | 2–0 | 2–5 | 2–4 | 1–0 | 0–2 |
| Odd Grenland | 4–2 | 3–1 | 3–1 | 0–2 | 0–0 | 1–0 | — | 0–0 | 2–1 | 3–2 | 2–2 | 2–1 | 0–3 | 1–3 |
| Rosenborg | 6–1 | 2–3 | 4–1 | 4–0 | 2–1 | 5–0 | 3–5 | — | 3–0 | 2–1 | 3–1 | 2–2 | 4–2 | 3–2 |
| Skeid | 1–3 | 1–2 | 0–1 | 4–4 | 3–5 | 0–6 | 3–1 | 1–7 | — | 1–3 | 4–0 | 2–1 | 0–2 | 3–2 |
| Stabæk | 3–2 | 2–3 | 1–1 | 1–6 | 4–2 | 3–1 | 2–5 | 2–0 | 5–0 | — | 2–1 | 1–1 | 3–0 | 3–1 |
| Strømsgodset | 0–1 | 1–2 | 2–1 | 1–1 | 0–2 | 2–5 | 3–5 | 1–3 | 3–1 | 4–3 | — | 3–6 | 0–3 | 1–0 |
| Tromsø | 5–1 | 5–0 | 4–1 | 4–1 | 1–2 | 1–1 | 5–0 | 2–1 | 8–2 | 3–3 | 3–2 | — | 2–2 | 1–3 |
| Vålerenga | 1–1 | 1–2 | 2–1 | 3–1 | 2–0 | 1–2 | 2–1 | 0–5 | 2–2 | 1–3 | 2–3 | 1–3 | — | 4–2 |
| Viking | 3–3 | 4–0 | 3–0 | 2–4 | 4–1 | 1–1 | 1–2 | 0–2 | 0–1 | 2–3 | 3–2 | 2–1 | 2–0 | — |

Source: NIFS (in Norwegian)
Legend: Blue = home team win; Yellow = draw; Red = away team win.

== Season statistics ==
=== Top scorers ===
| Rank | Player | Club | Goals |
|---|---|---|---|
| 1 | (Norway) Rune Lange | Tromsø | 23 |
| 2 | (Norway) Andreas Lund | Molde | 21 |
| 3 | (Norway) Jostein Flo | Strømsgodset | 18 |
| 4 | (Iceland) Ríkharður Daðason | Viking | 17 |
| 5 | (Iceland) Heiðar Helguson | Lillestrøm | 16 |
| 5 | (Norway) Bengt Sæternes | Bodø/Glimt | 16 |
| 7 | (Norway) Sigurd Rushfeldt | Rosenborg | 15 |

=== Attendances ===
| Pos | Team | Total | High | Low | Average | Change |
|---|---|---|---|---|---|---|
| 1 | Rosenborg | 173,665 | 19,514 | 9,236 | 13,359 | +1.5% |
| 2 | Brann | 135,180 | 16,477 | 7,703 | 10,398 | +15.8% |
| 3 | Molde | 93,122 | 12,914 | 4,500 | 7,163 | −15.9% |
| 4 | Vålerenga | 86,138 | 12,231 | 3,481 | 6,626 | −15.8% |
| 5 | Viking | 79,408 | 12,501 | 4,137 | 6,108 | +7.3% |
| 6 | Odd Grenland | 61,777 | 7,493 | 2,525 | 4,752 | n/a^{1} |
| 7 | Lillestrøm | 58,306 | 6,571 | 2,585 | 4,485 | +14.0% |
| 8 | Tromsø | 54,936 | 6,286 | 3,023 | 4,226 | +20.2% |
| 9 | Strømsgodset | 51,430 | 7,316 | 1,665 | 3,956 | −9.3% |
| 10 | Stabæk | 48,974 | 6,126 | 2,722 | 3,767 | +10.9% |
| 11 | Bodø/Glimt | 43,146 | 5,966 | 1,910 | 3,319 | −5.0% |
| 12 | Moss | 37,663 | 3,666 | 1,844 | 2,897 | +0.3% |
| 13 | Kongsvinger | 31,059 | 4,025 | 1,222 | 2,389 | −4.6% |
| 14 | Skeid | 22,932 | 5,714 | 665 | 1,764 | n/a^{1} |
| | League total | 977,736 | 19,514 | 665 | 5,372 | +2.0% |

Source: nifs.no
Notes:
1: Team played last season in 1. divisjon.
