= 2000 Tippeligaen =

56th season of top-tier football league in Norway

Tippeligaen
- Season: 2000
- Dates: 8 April – 22 October
- Champions: Rosenborg; 15th title
- Relegated: Vålerenga; Start; Haugesund
- Champions League: Rosenborg; Brann
- UEFA Cup: Viking; Odd Grenland
- Matches: 182
- Goals: 626 (3.44 per match)
- Top goalscorer: Thorstein Helstad (18 goals)
- Biggest home win: Rosenborg 9–0 Bryne (15 October 2000)
- Biggest away win: Moss 1–6 Bodø/Glimt (2 August 2000)
- Highest scoring: Rosenborg 9–0 Bryne (15 October 2000)
- Highest attendance: 18,520; Brann 2–0 Moss (16 May 2000)
- Lowest attendance: 1,824; Moss 2–2 Haugesund (20 August 2000); Haugesund 1–0 Lillestrøm (22 October 2000)
- Average attendance: 5,725 ▲6.6%

The 2000 Tippeligaen was the 56th completed season of top division football in Norway.

Each team played 26 games with 3 points given for wins and 1 for draws. Number thirteen and fourteen are relegated, number twelve has to play two qualification matches (home and away) against number three in the first division (where number one and two are directly promoted) for the last spot.

== Teams and locations ==
Locations of the teams in 2000 Tippeligaen

Note: Table lists in alphabetical order.

Team	Ap.	Location	Stadium
Bodø/Glimt	12	Bodø	Aspmyra Stadion
Brann	44	Bergen	Brann Stadion
Bryne	14	Bryne	Bryne Stadion
Haugesund	3	Haugesund	Haugesund Stadion
Lillestrøm	37	Lillestrøm	Åråsen Stadion
Molde	25	Molde	Molde Stadion
Moss	20	Moss	Melløs Stadion
Odd Grenland	20	Skien	Odd Stadion
Rosenborg	37	Trondheim	Lerkendal Stadion
Stabæk	6	Bærum	Nadderud Stadion
Start	29	Kristiansand	Kristiansand Stadion
Tromsø	15	Tromsø	Alfheim Stadion
Vålerenga	41	Oslo	Ullevaal Stadion
Viking	51	Stavanger	Stavanger Stadion

== League table ==
Pos	Team	Pld	W	D	L	GF	GA	GD	Pts	Qualification or relegation
1	Rosenborg (C)	26	16	6	4	61	26	+35	54	Qualification for the Champions League third qualifying round
2	Brann	26	14	5	7	53	40	+13	47	Qualification for the Champions League second qualifying round
3	Viking	26	13	6	7	51	39	+12	45	Qualification for the UEFA Cup qualifying round
4	Tromsø	26	13	5	8	51	46	+5	44	
5	Stabæk	26	12	6	8	59	33	+26	42	
6	Lillestrøm	26	11	7	8	42	29	+13	40	
7	Molde	26	11	7	8	46	47	−1	40	
8	Odd Grenland	26	11	5	10	40	31	+9	38	Qualification for the UEFA Cup first round (Note: Odd Grenland qualified as the winner of the 2000 Norwegian Cup.)
9	Moss	26	8	8	10	38	44	−6	32	
10	Bodø/Glimt	26	6	10	10	48	59	−11	28	
11	Bryne	26	7	6	13	32	60	−28	27	
12	Vålerenga (R)	26	5	9	12	32	44	−12	24	Qualification for the relegation play-offs
13	Start (R)	26	5	6	15	40	66	−26	21	Relegation to First Division
14	Haugesund (R)	26	5	4	17	33	62	−29	19	Relegation to First Division

Source: fotball.no
Rules for classification: 1) points; 2) goal difference; 3) number of goals scored.
(C) Champions; (R) Relegated

== Relegation play-offs ==
Sogndal won the play-offs against Vålerenga. The score ended 3–3 on aggregate, Sogndal won on the away goals rule and Vålerenga were relegated to 1. divisjon.

25 October 2000
15:00 CET (UTC+1)

Sogndal	1–1	Vålerenga
Mørkøre 7'	Report	Viikmäe 72'

Fosshaugane Campus, Sogndalsfjøra
Attendance: 3,397
Referee: Tor Arne Fiskum

30 October 2000
19:00 CET (UTC+1)

Vålerenga	2–2	Sogndal
Rekdal 38'; Bjørkan 54'	Report	Herfindal 13'; Øren 86'

Ullevaal Stadion, Oslo
Attendance: 7,697
Referee: Terje Hauge

== Results ==
Home \ Away	BOD	BRA	BRY	HAU	LIL	MOL	MOS	ODD	ROS	STB	IKS	TRO	VÅL	VIK
Bodø/Glimt	—	3–2	1–1	2–2	3–0	2–2	4–1	1–2	0–3	3–3	3–4	1–4	0–0	1–2
Brann	0–2	—	0–0	2–1	0–2	4–0	2–0	0–0	1–1	2–2	2–1	2–0	3–1	4–1
Bryne	1–2	0–3	—	1–0	4–2	1–3	2–0	1–0	3–3	2–1	4–2	2–3	1–0	0–3
Haugesund	2–2	2–4	3–1	—	1–0	2–4	0–2	1–0	1–3	0–4	1–2	0–2	4–2	1–1
Lillestrøm	3–3	1–2	1–1	4–1	—	1–1	1–0	2–0	0–2	0–0	4–0	6–0	2–1	0–1
Molde	7–1	1–3	1–1	2–1	0–2	—	0–3	3–2	0–1	2–4	3–3	3–3	2–1	0–0
Moss	1–6	3–2	5–0	2–2	0–0	0–1	—	0–0	1–1	1–1	4–0	4–0	2–1	1–5
Odd Grenland	2–2	2–0	4–2	4–2	2–1	3–0	2–2	—	0–3	2–0	3–0	3–0	4–0	2–3
Rosenborg	2–1	4–4	9–0	4–1	2–1	0–1	5–1	2–0	—	3–0	1–2	1–1	2–1	1–2
Stabæk	6–1	7–1	2–0	2–0	0–2	6–1	2–0	1–2	0–2	—	1–0	2–3	4–0	1–1
Start	2–2	0–2	4–2	1–2	3–4	2–2	1–1	1–0	1–3	2–5	—	1–1	2–3	4–4
Tromsø	4–1	4–1	3–0	5–2	1–1	0–1	3–0	2–0	2–0	2–1	3–2	—	1–1	2–5
Vålerenga	1–1	0–1	2–2	2–0	0–1	1–5	2–2	0–0	2–2	0–0	3–0	4–1	—	3–1
Viking	2–0	2–6	3–0	4–1	1–1	0–1	1–2	2–1	0–1	1–4	3–0	2–1	1–1	—

Source: NIFS (in Norwegian)
Legend: Blue = home team win; Yellow = draw; Red = away team win.

== Season statistics ==
=== Top scorers ===
Rank	Player	Club	Goals
1	(Norway) Thorstein Helstad	Brann	18
2	(Iceland) Ríkharður Daðason	Viking	15
2	(Iceland) Tryggvi Gudmundsson	Tromsø	15
2	(Norway) Magne Hoseth	Molde	15
5	(Norway) Tommy Bergersen	Bodø/Glimt	13
5	(Norway) Erik Nevland	Viking	13
5	(Norway) Bengt Sæternes	Bodø/Glimt	13
8	(Norway) Frode Johnsen	Rosenborg	12
9	(Sweden) Hans Berggren	Haugesund	11
9	(Norway) Christian Michelsen	Stabæk	11
9	(Sweden) Andreas Ottosson	Start	11

Source: altomfotball.no

=== Attendances ===
Pos	Team	Total	High	Low	Average	Change
1	Rosenborg	155,278	18,129	9,540	11,944	−10.6%
2	Brann	148,061	18,520	6,417	11,389	+9.5%
3	Vålerenga	99,190	17,660	3,765	7,630	+15.2%
4	Molde	88,609	11,167	5,382	6,816	−4.8%
5	Viking	86,570	10,860	4,360	6,659	+9.0%
6	Start	72,164	8,004	3,659	5,551	n/a^{1}
7	Odd Grenland	62,324	8,623	2,369	4,794	+0.9%
8	Lillestrøm	61,716	9,054	2,849	4,747	+5.8%
9	Tromsø	51,039	6,408	2,656	3,926	−7.1%
10	Stabæk	48,998	6,345	2,488	3,769	+0.1%
11	Bryne	46,809	9,003	2,001	3,601	n/a^{1}
12	Haugesund	44,514	4,789	1,824	3,424	n/a^{1}
13	Bodø/Glimt	41,251	4,902	2,268	3,173	−4.4%
14	Moss	35,509	4,033	1,824	2,731	−5.7%
	League total	1,042,032	18,520	1,824	5,725	+6.6%

Source: nifs.no
Notes:
1: Team played last season in 1. divisjon.
