= 1949–50 Norwegian Main League =

6th season of top-tier football league in Norway

Hovedserien
- Season: 1949–50
- Champions: Fram Larvik; 1st title
- Relegated: Ålgård FK; Storm; Ranheim; Mjøndalen

The 1949–50 Hovedserien was the 6th completed season of top division football in Norway.

== Overview ==
It was contested by 16 teams, and Fram Larvik won the championship.

== Teams and locations ==
Note: Table lists in alphabetical order.

Group A
Team	Ap.	Location
Ålgård	4	Ålgård
Fram	4	Larvik
Lyn	5	Oslo
Sarpsborg FK	5	Sarpsborg
Selbak	3	Fredrikstad
Storm	5	Skien
Vålerengen	5	Oslo
Viking	5	Stavanger

Group B
Team	Ap.	Location
Fredrikstad	5	Fredrikstad
Mjøndalen	5	Nedre Eiker
Ørn	5	Horten
Ranheim	4	Trondheim
Sandefjord BK	4	Sandefjord
Skeid	4	Oslo
Sparta	3	Sarpsborg
Strømmen	1	Strømmen

== League tables ==
=== Group A ===
Pos	Team	Pld	W	D	L	GF	GA	GD	Pts	Qualification or relegation
1	Fram Larvik (C)	14	7	6	1	22	13	+9	20	Qualification for the championship final
2	Sarpsborg FK	14	5	7	2	24	17	+7	17	
3	Viking	14	5	6	3	28	20	+8	16	
4	Vålerengen	14	5	6	3	23	24	−1	16	
5	Lyn	14	5	3	6	21	21	0	13	
6	Selbak TIF	14	3	7	4	17	21	−4	13	
7	Ålgård (R)	14	1	7	6	8	18	−10	9	Relegation
8	Storm (R)	14	2	4	8	18	27	−9	8	Relegation

Source: RSSSF
(C) Champions; (R) Relegated

=== Group B ===
Pos	Team	Pld	W	D	L	GF	GA	GD	Pts	Qualification or relegation
1	Fredrikstad	14	8	5	1	38	11	+27	21	Qualification for the championship final
2	Sparta	14	9	3	2	26	9	+17	21	
3	Ørn	14	8	1	5	32	24	+8	17	
4	Skeid	14	6	4	4	19	18	+1	16	
5	Strømmen	14	5	3	6	19	25	−6	13	
6	Sandefjord BK	14	4	3	7	15	25	−10	11	
7	Ranheim (R)	14	3	3	8	10	29	−19	9	Relegation
8	Mjøndalen (R)	14	1	2	11	9	27	−18	4	Relegation

Source: RSSSF
(R) Relegated

== Results ==
=== Group A ===
Home \ Away	ÅLG	FRA	LYN	SAR	SEL	STO	VIF	VIK
Ålgård		0–2	1–1	1–1	0–0	1–0	1–1	1–3
Fram Larvik	0–0		0–2	3–2	3–0	1–1	1–1	2–1
Lyn	0–0	1–3		1–1	1–2	4–2	2–3	0–1
Sarpsborg FK	2–2	0–1	2–1		2–0	2–0	4–1	3–3
Selbak	2–0	1–1	2–3	1–1		1–1	2–4	2–2
Storms	2–0	0–1	4–2	1–2	0–1		1–1	2–2
Vålerengen	3–1	2–2	0–1	1–1	1–1	4–2		0–5
Viking	1–0	2–2	0–2	1–1	2–2	5–2	0–1	

Source: NIFS.no
Legend: Blue = home team win; Yellow = draw; Red = away team win.

=== Group B ===
Home \ Away	FFK	MJØ	ØRN	RAN	SBK	SKD	SPA	STR
Fredrikstad		4–2	8–0	4–0	1–1	2–2	1–1	5–0
Mjøndalen	0–1		0–2	0–1	0–3	1–0	0–1	2–2
Ørn	2–3	2–0		0–0	4–0	5–3	0–2	4–0
Ranheim	1–5	2–2	0–2		1–0	0–2	1–3	0–3
Sandefjord BK	1–4	3–0	1–5	3–1		0–0	1–0	1–2
Skeid	1–0	2–1	2–0	0–1	1–1		0–4	3–1
Sparta	0–0	2–1	3–2	1–1	4–0	1–2		3–0
Strømmen	0–0	2–0	2–4	4–1	2–0	1–1	0–1	

Source: NIFS.no
Legend: Blue = home team win; Yellow = draw; Red = away team win.

== Championship final ==
- Fredrikstad FK 1–1 Fram Larvik
- Fram Larvik 1–0 Fredrikstad FK
