= 1980 Molde FK season =

Molde
1980 season
- Chairman: Gunnar Hagbø
- Head coach: Torkild Brakstad
- Stadium: Molde Stadion
- 1. divisjon: 10th (relegated)
- Norwegian Cup: Fourth round vs. Fredrikstad
- Top goalscorer: League: Jan Fuglset (6); Rune Ulvestad (6); All: Jan Fuglset (9)
- Highest home attendance: 5,480 vs Bryne (27 April 1980)
- Lowest home attendance: 1,592 vs Vålerengen (8 June 1980)
- Average home league attendance: 3,105

The 1980 season was Molde's 8th season in the top flight of Norwegian football and their first since their promotion from 2. divisjon in 1979. This season Molde competed in 1. divisjon (first tier) and the Norwegian Cup.

In the league, Molde finished in 10th position, 11 points behind winners Start and were relegated to 2. divisjon.

Molde participated in the 1980 Norwegian Cup. On 6 August, they were eliminated by Fredrikstad after a 1–2 defeat at Fredrikstad Stadion in the fourth round.

== Squad ==
Note: Flags indicate national team as defined under FIFA eligibility rules; some limited exceptions apply. Players may hold more than one non-FIFA nationality.

No.	Pos.	Nation	Player
—	GK	NOR	Runar Bratli
—	GK	NOR	Inge Bratteteig
—	GK	NOR	Stein Hagen
—	GK	NOR	Roger Marhaug
—	DF	NOR	Stål Bjørkly
—	DF	NOR	Tor Gunnar Hagbø
—	DF	NOR	Åge Hareide
—	DF	NOR	Ivar Helge Mittet
—	DF	NOR	Odd Ivar Moen
—	DF	NOR	Ulrich Møller (Captain)
—	DF	NOR	Arnfinn Rye
—	DF	NOR	Einar Sekkeseter
—	DF	NOR	Bertil Stranden

No.	Pos.	Nation	Player
—	MF	NOR	Per Arne Aase
—	MF	NOR	Knut Bjørnå
—	MF	NOR	Gunnar Furu
—	MF	NOR	Stein Olav Hestad
—	MF	NOR	Torgeir Vatten
—	FW	NOR	Jan Fuglset
—	FW	NOR	Lars Tennfjord
—	FW	NOR	Rune Ulvestad
—		NOR	Stein Erik Blikås
—		NOR	Tor Hånde
—		NOR	Terje Rye
—		NOR	Ståle Stavem

== Friendlies ==
23 February 1980	Molde	5–2	Bergsøy	Molde
CET (UTC+1)	Goal	Report	Goal	Stadium: Kunstgressbanen (Lubbenes)

1 March 1980	Molde	7–0	Aalesund	Molde
CET (UTC+1)	Goal	Report		Stadium: Kunstgressbanen (Lubbenes)

8 March 1980	Molde	1–1 (5–4 p)	Rosenborg	Molde
CET (UTC+1)	Goal	Report	Goal	Stadium: Kunstgressbanen (Lubbenes)

9 March 1980	Molde	3–0	Hamarkameratene	Molde
CET (UTC+1)	Goal	Report		Stadium: Kunstgressbanen (Lubbenes)

16 March 1980	Molde	1–2	Strindheim	Molde
CET (UTC+1)	Goal	Report	Goal	Stadium: Kunstgressbanen (Lubbenes)

22 March 1980	Molde	2–1	Sunndal	Molde
CET (UTC+1)	Goal	Report	Goal	Stadium: Kunstgressbanen (Lubbenes)

2 April 1980	Hødd	3–1	Molde	Giske
CET (UTC+1)	Goal	Report	Goal

13 April 1980	Molde	3–0	Stabæk	Aalborg
CET (UTC+1)	Goal	Report

15 April 1980	Aalborg (Denmark)	0–2	(Norway) Molde	Aalborg
CET (UTC+1)		Report	Goal

16 April 1980	Randers (Denmark)	1–1	(Norway) Molde	Aalborg
CET (UTC+1)		Report	Goal	Stadium:

17 April 1980	Nørresundby (Denmark)	2–2	(Norway) Molde	Aalborg
CET (UTC+1)	Goal	Report	Goal

20 April 1980	Molde	0–0	Haugar	Eresfjord
CET (UTC+1)		Report

== Competitions ==
=== 1. divisjon ===
==== Results summary ====
Overall								Home								Away							
Pld	W	D	L	GF	GA	GD	Pts	Pld	W	D	L	GF	GA	GD	Pts	Pld	W	D	L	GF	GA	GD	Pts
22	6	6	10	30	39	–9	18	11	3	3	5	16	20	–4	9	11	3	3	5	14	19	–5	9

==== Positions by round ====
Round	1	2	3	4	5	6	7	8	9	10	11	12	13	14	15	16	17	18	19	20	21	22
Ground	H	A	A	H	A	H	A	H	A	H	A	A	H	H	A	H	A	H	A	H	A	H
Result	D	L	D	L	D	D	L	W	W	L	L	L	D	W	W	W	L	L	D	L	W	L
Position	3	8	8	10	10	10	11	10	9	7	9	10	11	9	8	8	8	9	9	10	9	10

Source: see below

==== Results ====
27 April 1980 1	Molde	2–2	Bryne	Molde
CET (UTC+1)	Hestad 61' (?)	Report	Unknown (?); Unknown (?)	Stadium: Molde Stadion; Attendance: 5,480

4 May 1980 2	Moss	2–0	Molde	Moss
CET (UTC+1)	Unknown (?); Unknown (?)	Report		Stadium: Melløs Stadion; Attendance: 4,727

11 May 1980 3	Lillestrøm	1–1	Molde	Lillestrøm
CET (UTC+1)	Unknown 12'	Report	Ulvestad 88'	Stadium: Åråsen Stadion; Attendance: 4,011

15 May 1980 4	Molde	1–2	Start	Molde
CET (UTC+1)	Ulvestad (?)	Report	Unknown (?); Unknown (?)	Stadium: Molde Stadion; Attendance: 4,450

18 May 1980 5	Skeid	0–0	Molde	Oslo
CET (UTC+1)		Report		Stadium: Bislett Stadion; Attendance: 2,461

26 May 1980 6	Molde	1–1	Fredrikstad	Molde
CET (UTC+1)	Ulvestad 44'	Report	Unknown 60'	Stadium: Molde Stadion; Attendance: 2,750

2 June 1980 7	Viking	4–0	Molde	Stavanger
CET (UTC+1)	Unknown (?); Unknown (?); Unknown (?); Unknown (?)	Report		Stadium: Stavanger Stadion; Attendance: 6,585

8 June 1980 8	Molde	3–1	Vålerengen	Molde
CET (UTC+1)	Tennfjord (?); Furu (?); Hagbø (?)	Report	Unknown (?)	Stadium: Molde Stadion; Attendance: 1,592

16 June 1980 9	Rosenborg	2–5	Molde	Trondheim
CET (UTC+1)	Nilssen 32' (pen.); Sundmoen 60'	Report	Fuglset (?); Ulvestad (?); Tennfjord (?); Møller (?)	Stadium: Lerkendal Stadion; Attendance: 8,700

22 June 1980 10	Molde	3–4	Bodø/Glimt	Molde
CET (UTC+1)	Unknown (?); Unknown (?); Unknown (?)	Report	Unknown (?); Unknown (?); Unknown (?); Unknown (?)	Stadium: Molde Stadion; Attendance: 2,436

29 June 1980 11	Lyn	2–1	Molde	Oslo
CET (UTC+1)	Ødegaard (?); Alexander (?)	Report	Vatten (?)	Stadium: Ullevaal Stadion; Attendance: 774

10 August 1980 12	Bryne	2–1	Molde	Bryne
CET (UTC+1)	Unknown 22' (o.g.); Unknown 39'	Report	Fuglset 37'	Stadium: Bryne Stadion; Attendance: 4,387

13 August 1980 13	Molde	1–1	Moss	Molde
CET (UTC+1)	Fuglset (?)	Report	Unknown (?)	Stadium: Molde Stadion; Attendance: 2,450

17 August 1980 14	Molde	3–1	Lillestrøm	Molde
CET (UTC+1)	Bjørkly 53'; Furu 59'; Moen (?)	Report	Unknown (?)	Stadium: Molde Stadion; Attendance: 3,450

24 August 1980 15	Start	0–1	Molde	Kristiansand
CET (UTC+1)		Report	Fuglset (?)	Stadium: Kristiansand Stadion; Attendance: 3,739

27 August 1982 16	Molde	2–1	Skeid	Molde
CET (UTC+1)	Fuglset (?); Rye (?)	Report	Unknown (?)	Stadium: Molde Stadion; Attendance: 2,640

7 September 1980 17	Fredrikstad	5–2	Molde	Fredrikstad
CET (UTC+1)	Unknown (?); Unknown (?); Unknown (?); Unknown (?); Unknown (?)	Report	Unknown (?); Unknown (?)	Stadium: Fredrikstad Stadion; Attendance: 3,862

14 September 1980 18	Molde	0–4	Viking	Molde
CET (UTC+1)		Report	Unknown (?); Unknown (?); Unknown (?); Unknown (?)	Stadium: Molde Stadion; Attendance: 2,450

28 September 1980 19	Vålerengen	1–1	Molde	Oslo
CET (UTC+1)	Unknown 87'	Report	Ulvestad (?)	Stadium: Bislett Stadion; Attendance: 5,208

3 October 1980 20	Molde	0–2	Rosenborg	Molde
CET (UTC+1)		Report	Husby 31'; Sørlie 72'	Stadium: Molde Stadion; Attendance: 3,780

12 October 1980 21	Bodø/Glimt	0–2	Molde	Bodø
CET (UTC+1)		Report	Moen (?); Ulvestad (?)	Stadium: Aspmyra Stadion; Attendance: 2,002

19 October 1980 22	Molde	0–1	Lyn	Molde
CET (UTC+1)		Report	Haslie 90+2'	Stadium: Molde Stadion; Attendance: 2,680

==== League table ====
Pos	Team	Pld	W	D	L	GF	GA	GD	Pts	Qualification or relegation
1	Start (C)	22	13	3	6	52	26	+26	29	Qualification for the European Cup first round
2	Bryne	22	12	5	5	44	22	+22	29	Qualification for the UEFA Cup first round
3	Lillestrøm	22	10	7	5	36	25	+11	27	
4	Viking	22	10	5	7	34	27	+7	25	
5	Rosenborg	22	9	5	8	42	36	+6	23	
6	Moss	22	8	7	7	33	27	+6	23	
7	Fredrikstad	22	9	5	8	35	39	−4	23	
8	Vålerengen	22	6	8	8	26	26	0	20	Qualification for the Cup Winners' Cup first round
9	Lyn	22	8	3	11	26	43	−17	19	
10	Molde (R)	22	6	6	10	30	39	−9	18	Relegation to Second Division
11	Skeid (R)	22	4	8	10	21	39	−18	16	Relegation to Second Division
12	Bodø/Glimt (R)	22	5	2	15	13	43	−30	12	Relegation to Second Division

Source: NIFS
Rules for classification: 1) points; 2) goal difference; 3) number of goals scored.
(C) Champions; (R) Relegated

=== Norwegian Cup ===
1980 First round	Valder	0–1	Molde	Valderøya
CEST (UTC+2)		Report	Unknown

18 June 1980 Second round	Molde	2–1	Ørsta	Molde
CEST (UTC+2)	Fuglset (?); Hestad (?)	Report	Håskjold 7'	Stadium: Molde Stadion

4 July 1980 Third round	Eid	1–3	Sunndal	Nordfjordeid
CEST (UTC+2)	Ulvestad 88'	Report	Fuglset (?); Hareide (?)	Attendance: 1,500

6 August 1980 Fourth round	Molde	1–2	Fredrikstad	Molde
CEST (UTC+2)	Hareide 74'	Report	Olsen 2'; Ahlsen 21'	Stadium: Molde Stadion; Attendance: 1,950; Referee: Roald Håvåg

== Squad statistics ==
=== Appearances and goals ===
Lacking information:

- Appearance statistics from 1. divisjon round 1 (at home against Fredrikstad) and round 17 (away against Fredrikstad) are missing.
- Goalscorers from 1. divisjon round 10 (3 goals against Bodø/Glimt) and round 17 (2 goals against Fredrikstad) are missing.
- Appearance statistics and one goalscorer from Norwegian Cup round 1 (against Valder) are missing.

No.	Pos	Nat	Player	Total		1. divisjon		Norwegian Cup	
No.	Pos	Nat	Player	Apps	Goals	Apps	Goals	Apps	Goals
	GK	(Norway) NOR	Runar Bratli	1	0	0	0	1	0
	GK	(Norway) NOR	Inge Bratteteig	9	0	8	0	1	0
	GK	(Norway) NOR	Stein Hagen	13	0	12	0	0+1	0
	GK	(Norway) NOR	Roger Marhaug	1	0	0	0	1	0
	DF	(Norway) NOR	Stål Bjørkly	18	1	16	1	2	0
	DF	(Norway) NOR	Tor Gunnar Hagbø	5	1	0+4	1	0+1	0
	DF	(Norway) NOR	Åge Hareide	25	2	22	0	3	2
	DF	(Norway) NOR	Odd Ivar Moen	19	2	14+4	2	1	0
	DF	(Norway) NOR	Ulrich Møller	16	1	11+2	1	2+1	0
	DF	(Norway) NOR	Einar Sekkeseter	11	0	9+1	0	0+1	0
	DF	(Norway) NOR	Bertil Stranden	16	0	12+1	0	3	0
	MF	(Norway) NOR	Per Arne Aase	7	0	5+1	0	1	0
	MF	(Norway) NOR	Knut Bjørnå	1	0	0+1	0	0	0
	MF	(Norway) NOR	Gunnar Furu	20	2	17+1	2	2	0
	MF	(Norway) NOR	Stein Olav Hestad	23	3	20	2	3	1
	MF	(Norway) NOR	Arnfinn Rye	20	1	17+1	1	2	0
	MF	(Norway) NOR	Torgeir Vatten	23	1	20	1	3	0
	FW	(Norway) NOR	Jan Fuglset	23	9	20	6	3	3
	FW	(Norway) NOR	Lars Tennfjord	11	2	5+3	2	2+1	0
	FW	(Norway) NOR	Rune Ulvestad	19	6	15+1	6	3	0

=== Goalscorers ===
Rank	Position	Nat.	Player	1. divisjon	Norwegian Cup	Total
1	FW	(Norway)	Jan Fuglset	6	3	9
2	FW	(Norway)	Rune Ulvestad	6	0	6
3	MF	(Norway)	Stein Olav Hestad	2	1	3
4	MF	(Norway)	Gunnar Furu	2	0	2
4	DF	(Norway)	Odd Ivar Moen	2	0	2
4	FW	(Norway)	Lars Tennfjord	2	0	2
4	DF	(Norway)	Åge Hareide	0	2	2
8	DF	(Norway)	Stål Bjørkly	1	0	1
8	DF	(Norway)	Tor Gunnar Hagbø	1	0	1
8	DF	(Norway)	Ulrich Møller	1	0	1
8	MF	(Norway)	Arnfinn Rye	1	0	1
8	MF	(Norway)	Torgeir Vatten	1	0	1
			Unknown	5	1	6
			TOTALS	30	7	37

== See also ==
- Molde FK seasons
