= 1976 Molde FK season =

Molde
1976 season
- Chairman: Jon Hoem
- Coaches: Torkild Brakstad; Jan Fuglset
- Stadium: Molde Stadion
- 1. divisjon: 6th
- Norwegian Cup: Fourth round vs Bodø/Glimt
- Top goalscorer: League: Jan Fuglset (17); All: Jan Fuglset (19)
- Highest home attendance: 4,768 vs Lillestrøm (25 April 1976)
- Lowest home attendance: 1,950 vs HamKam (1 August 1976)
- Average home league attendance: 3,585

The 1976 season was Molde's third consecutive year in the top flight, and their 5th season in total in the top flight of Norwegian football. This season Molde competed in 1. divisjon (first tier) and the Norwegian Cup.

In the league, Molde finished in 6th position, 10 points behind winners Lillestrøm.

== Squad ==
Note: Flags indicate national team as defined under FIFA eligibility rules; some limited exceptions apply. Players may hold more than one non-FIFA nationality.

No.	Pos.	Nation	Player
—	GK	NOR	Frank Aadland
—	GK	NOR	Inge Bratteteig
—	GK	NOR	Bjørn Nilsen
—	DF	NOR	Erik Brakstad
—	DF	NOR	Torkild Brakstad
—	DF	NOR	Stål Bjørkly
—	DF	NOR	Asbjørn Bjørseth
—	DF	NOR	Arild Haukaas
—	DF	NOR	Svein Kanestrøm
—	DF	NOR	Einar Sekkeseter
—	DF	NOR	Bertil Stranden
—	MF	NOR	Knut Bjørnå

No.	Pos.	Nation	Player
—	MF	NOR	Åge Hareide
—	MF	NOR	Karl Johannesen
—	MF	NOR	Ole Bjørn Kavli
—	MF	NOR	Olav Nausthaug
—	MF	NOR	Kjell Westerdahl
—	FW	NOR	Carl Apneseth
—	FW	NOR	Jan Fuglset
—	FW	NOR	Stein Olav Hestad
—	FW	NOR	Harry Hestad
—	FW	NOR	Odd Ivar Moen
—	FW	NOR	Bjørner Oshaug

== Friendlies ==
6 March 1976	Clausenengen	0–2	Molde
		Report	Goal

14 March 1976	Molde	4–0	Træff
	Goal	Report

20 March 1976	Sunndal	0–4	Molde
		Report	Goal

27 March 1976	Molde	3–0	Clausenengen
	Goal	Report

7 April 1976	Aalesund	0–1	Molde
		Report	Goal

10 April 1976	Molde	4–0	Kristiansund
	Goal	Report

14 April 1976	Rosenborg	0–0	Molde
		Report

19 April 1976	Molde	2–3	Hødd
	Goal	Report	Goal

4 May 1976	Sunndal	0–5	Molde
		Report	Goal

== Competitions ==
=== 1. divisjon ===
==== Results summary ====
Overall								Home								Away							
Pld	W	D	L	GF	GA	GD	Pts	Pld	W	D	L	GF	GA	GD	Pts	Pld	W	D	L	GF	GA	GD	Pts
22	9	3	10	34	29	+5	21	11	7	2	2	24	12	+12	16	11	2	1	8	10	17	–7	5

==== Positions by round ====
Round	1	2	3	4	5	6	7	8	9	10	11	12	13	14	15	16	17	18	19	20	21	22
Ground	H	A	H	A	H	A	H	A	H	A	H	A	H	A	H	A	H	A	H	A	H	A
Result	L	L	L	L	W	L	W	L	W	D	D	L	D	L	W	L	W	L	W	W	W	W
Position	9	11	12	12	11	11	11	11	10	10	10	10	10	10	10	10	10	10	10	8	7	6

Source: see below

==== Results ====
25 April 1976 1	Molde	1–2	Lillestrøm	Molde
	Fuglset ?'	Report	Unknown ?'; Unknown ?'	Stadium: Molde Stadion; Attendance: 4,768

2 May 1976 2	Hamarkameratene	4–2	Molde	Hamar
	Unknown ?'; Unknown ?'; Unknown ?'; Unknown ?'	Report	Hareide ?', ?'	Stadium: Briskeby; Attendance: 3,658

9 May 1976 3	Molde	2–3	Brann	Molde
	Unknown ?'; Unknown ?'	Report	Aase ?', ?'; Austbø ?'	Stadium: Molde Stadion; Attendance: 3,500

13 May 1976 3	Rosenborg	1–0	Molde	Trondheim
	Florholmen 75'	Report		Stadium: Lerkendal Stadion; Attendance: 8,305

23 May 1976 5	Molde	2–0	Bryne	Molde
	Fuglset ?', ?'	Report		Stadium: Molde Stadion; Attendance: 3,480

27 May 1976 6	Start	1–0	Molde	Kristiansand
	Unknown ?'	Report		Stadium: Kristiansand Stadion; Attendance: 4,221

30 May 1976 7	Molde	3–0	Fredrikstad	Molde
	Brakstad ?', ?'; Fuglset ?'	Report		Stadium: Molde Stadion; Attendance: 3,239

7 June 1976 8	Mjøndalen	2–0	Molde	Mjøndalen
	Unknown ?'; Unknown ?'	Report		Stadium: Nedre Eiker Stadion; Attendance: 5,323

11 June 1976 9	Molde	3–2	Viking	Molde
	Sekkeseter 61'; Hareide ?', ?'	Report	Unknown ?'; Unknown ?'	Stadium: Molde Stadion; Attendance: 2,507

20 June 1976 10	Vard	0–0	Molde	Haugesund
		Report		Stadium: Haugesund Stadion; Attendance: 6,394

27 June 1976 11	Molde	2–2	Strømsgodset	Molde
	Hareide ?'; Fuglset ?'	Report	Unknown ?'; Unknown ?'	Stadium: Molde Stadion; Attendance: 3,600

26 July 1976 12	Lillestrøm	4–0	Molde	Lillestrøm
	Unknown ?'; Unknown ?'; Unknown ?'; Unknown ?'	Report		Stadium: Åråsen Stadion; Attendance: 3,411

1 August 1976 13	Molde	1–1	Hamarkameratene	Molde
	Fuglset ?'	Report	Unknown ?'	Stadium: Molde Stadion; Attendance: 1,950

9 August 1976 14	Brann	1–0	Molde	Bergen
	Tronstad ?'	Report		Stadium: Brann Stadion; Attendance: 10,304

22 August 1976 15	Molde	3–0	Rosenborg	Molde
	Hareide ?', ?'; Moen ?'	Report		Stadium: Molde Stadion; Attendance: 3,929

29 August 1976 16	Bryne	1–0	Molde	Bryne
	Unknown ?'	Report		Stadium: Bryne Stadion; Attendance: 3,505

12 September 1976 17	Molde	2–0	Start	Molde
	Hareide ?'; Brakstad ?'	Report		Stadium: Molde Stadion; Attendance: 3,950

19 September 1976 18	Fredrikstad	2–1	Molde	Fredrikstad
	Unknown ?'; Unknown ?'	Report	Unknown ?'	Stadium: Fredrikstad Stadion; Attendance: 1,733

25 September 1976 19	Molde	2–1	Mjøndalen	Molde
	Brakstad ?'; Sekkeseter ?'	Report	Unknown ?'	Stadium: Molde Stadion; Attendance: 4,260

3 October 1976 20	Viking	0–1	Molde	Stavanger
		Report	Fuglset ?'	Stadium: Stavanger Stadion; Attendance: 5,400

10 October 1976 21	Molde	3–1	Vard	Molde
	Fuglset ?', ?', ?'	Report	Unknown ?'	Stadium: Molde Stadion; Attendance: 4,253

17 October 1976 22	Strømsgodset	1–6	Molde	Drammen
	Unknown ?'	Report	Fuglset ?', ?', ?', ?', ?', ?'	Stadium: Marienlyst Stadion; Attendance: 5,000

==== Table ====
Pos	Team	Pld	W	D	L	GF	GA	GD	Pts	Qualification or relegation
1	Lillestrøm (C)	22	13	5	4	39	19	+20	31	Qualification for the European Cup first round
2	Mjøndalen	22	13	4	5	40	23	+17	30	Qualification for the UEFA Cup first round
3	Brann	22	11	6	5	38	29	+9	28	Qualification for the Cup Winners' Cup first round
4	Start	22	8	8	6	23	19	+4	24	Qualification for the UEFA Cup first round
5	Viking	22	6	10	6	24	21	+3	22	
6	Molde	22	9	3	10	34	29	+5	21	
7	Hamarkameratene	22	7	7	8	31	29	+2	21	
8	Rosenborg	22	7	7	8	24	29	−5	21	
9	Bryne	22	6	7	9	30	35	−5	19	
10	Strømsgodset (R)	22	6	7	9	31	43	−12	19	Relegation to Second Division
11	Fredrikstad (R)	22	5	5	12	27	50	−23	15	Relegation to Second Division
12	Vard (R)	22	2	9	11	21	36	−15	13	Relegation to Second Division

Source: NIFS
Rules for classification: 1) points; 2) goal difference; 3) number of goals scored.
(C) Champions; (R) Relegated

=== Norwegian Cup ===
2 June 1976 First round	Molde	4–0	Varfjell	Molde
	Hareide ?', ?'; Johannesen ?', ?'	Report		Stadium: Molde Stadion; Attendance: 918

30 June 1976 Second round	Clausenengen	1–2	Molde	Kristiansund
	Unknown ?'	Report	Hareide ?'; Fuglset ?'	Stadium: Atlanten Stadion

1976 Third round	Molde	2–1	Bergsøy	Molde
	Hareide ?'; Moen ?'	Report	Unknown 1'	Stadium: Molde Stadion

1976 Fourth round	Bodø/Glimt	5–2 (a.e.t.)	Molde	Bodø
	Unknown ?'; Unknown ?'; Unknown ?'; Unknown ?'; Unknown ?'	Report	H. Hestad ?'; Fuglset ?'	Stadium: Aspmyra Stadion

== Squad statistics ==
=== Goalscorers ===
Rank	Position	Nat.	Player	1. divisjon	Norwegian Cup	Total
1	FW	(Norway)	Jan Fuglset	17	2	19
2	MF	(Norway)	Åge Hareide	8	4	12
3	DF	(Norway)	Torkild Brakstad	4	0	4
4	DF	(Norway)	Einar Sekkeseter	2	0	2
4	FW	(Norway)	Odd Ivar Moen	1	1	2
4	MF	(Norway)	Karl Johannesen	0	2	2
7	FW	(Norway)	Harry Hestad	0	1	1
			Unknown	2	0	2
			TOTALS	34	10	44

== See also ==
- Molde FK seasons
