= 1977 Molde FK season =

Molde
1977 season
- Chairman: Jon Hoem
- Coach: Huib Ruijgrok
- Stadium: Molde Stadion
- 1. divisjon: 3rd
- Norwegian Cup: First round vs Rollon
- Top goalscorer: League: Jan Fuglset (8); All: Jan Fuglset (9)
- Highest home attendance: 10,700 vs Lillestrøm (5 May 1977)
- Lowest home attendance: 3,715 vs Mjøndalen (14 August 1977)
- Average home league attendance: 5,508

The 1977 season was Molde's fourth consecutive year in the top flight, and their 6th season in total in the top flight of Norwegian football. This season Molde competed in 1. divisjon (first tier) and the Norwegian Cup.

In the league, Molde finished in 3rd position, 9 points behind winners Lillestrøm.

== Squad ==
Note: Flags indicate national team as defined under FIFA eligibility rules; some limited exceptions apply. Players may hold more than one non-FIFA nationality.

No.	Pos.	Nation	Player
—	GK	NOR	Torleif Bergsås
—	GK	NOR	Inge Bratteteig
—	GK	NOR	Stein Hagen
—	DF	NOR	Gudmund Bakken
—	DF	NOR	Stål Bjørkly
—	DF	NOR	Torkild Brakstad
—	DF	NOR	Svein Kanestrøm
—	DF	NOR	Kjell Arne Rød
—	DF	NOR	Einar Sekkeseter
—	DF	NOR	Snorre Strand
—	DF	NOR	Bertil Stranden
—	DF	NOR	Harald Stranden
—	MF	NOR	Per Arne Aase
—	MF	NOR	Knut Bjørnå

No.	Pos.	Nation	Player
—	MF	NOR	Arnfinn Groven
—	MF	NOR	Åge Hareide
—	MF	NOR	Arild Haukaas
—	MF	NOR	Ketil Hoem
—	MF	NOR	Olav Nausthaug
—	MF	NOR	Kjell Westerdahl
—	FW	NOR	Tor Aaram
—	FW	NOR	Jan Fuglset
—	FW	NED	Boudewijn de Geer (from August)
—	FW	NOR	Knut Harrang
—	FW	NOR	Stein Olav Hestad
—	FW	NOR	Harry Hestad
—	FW	NOR	Odd Ivar Moen
—	FW	NOR	Bjørner Oshaug

== Friendlies ==
13 March 1977	Sunndal	2–1	Molde
	Goal	Report	Goal

20 March 1977	Molde	2–1	Herd
	Goal	Report	Goal

27 March 1977	Molde	7–2	Steinkjer
	Goal	Report	Goal

31 March 1977	LFC (Netherlands)	0–0	(Norway) Molde
		Report

2 April 1977	Cambuur (Netherlands)	0–0	(Norway) Molde
		Report

2 April 1977	Sparta Rotterdam (Netherlands)	2–1	(Norway) Molde
	Goal	Report	Goal

6 April 1977	WCR (Netherlands)	2–1	(Norway) Molde
		Report	Goal

11 April 1977	Molde	2–1	Rosenborg
	Goal	Report	Goal

13 April 1977	Hødd	1–1	Molde
	Goal	Report	Goal

17 April 1977	Os	0–5	Molde
		Report	Goal

== Competitions ==
=== 1. divisjon ===
==== Results summary ====
Overall								Home								Away							
Pld	W	D	L	GF	GA	GD	Pts	Pld	W	D	L	GF	GA	GD	Pts	Pld	W	D	L	GF	GA	GD	Pts
22	12	3	7	31	28	+3	27	11	7	3	1	18	7	+11	17	11	5	0	6	13	21	–8	10

==== Results ====
21 April 1977 1	Hamarkameratene	1–0	Molde	Hamar
	Unknown ?'	Report		Stadium: Briskeby; Attendance: 4,166

1 May 1977 2	Molde	4–1	Vålerengen	Molde
	H. Hestad ?', ?'; Hareide ?'; Moen ?'	Report	Unknown ?'	Stadium: Molde Stadion; Attendance: 5,481

8 May 1977 3	Mjøndalen	0–1	Molde	Mjøndalen
		Report	Fuglset 83'	Stadium: Nedre Eiker Stadion; Attendance: 3,400

16 May 1977 4	Molde	3–2	Viking	Molde
	Fuglset ?'; H. Hestad ?'; Sekkeseter 67'	Report	Moen 5' (o.g.); Svendsen 85'	Stadium: Molde Stadion; Attendance: 5,400

19 May 1977 5	Rosenborg	2–0	Molde	Trondheim
	Florholmen 40', 90'	Report		Stadium: Lerkendal Stadion; Attendance: 7,900

22 May 1977 6	Molde	0–0	Start	Molde
		Report		Stadium: Molde Stadion; Attendance: 5,397

30 May 1977 7	Moss	2–3	Molde	Moss
	Unknown ?'; Unknown ?'	Report	Fuglset ?', ?'; Unknown ?' (o.g.)	Stadium: Melløs Stadion; Attendance: 5,331

5 June 1977 8	Molde	0–0	Lillestrøm	Molde
		Report		Stadium: Molde Stadion; Attendance: 10,700

13 June 1977 9	Brann	1–2	Molde	Bergen
	Unknown ?'	Report	S. Hestad ?', ?'	Stadium: Brann Stadion; Attendance: 16,641

19 June 1977 10	Molde	0–1	Bodø/Glimt	Molde
		Report	Unknown ?'	Stadium: Molde Stadion; Attendance: 8,700

26 June 1977 14	Bryne	1–3	Molde	Bryne
	Unknown ?'	Report	Fuglset ?'; Hareide ?', ?'	Stadium: Bryne Stadion; Attendance: 4,012

1 August 1977 12	Molde	1–0	Hamarkameratene	Molde
	Sekkeseter ?'	Report		Stadium: Molde Stadion; Attendance: 4,483

8 August 1977 13	Vålerengen	4–0	Molde	Oslo
	Unknown ?'; Unknown ?'; Unknown ?'; Unknown ?'	Report		Stadium: Bislett Stadion; Attendance: 7,321

14 August 1977 14	Molde	2–0	Mjøndalen	Molde
	de Geer ?'; Fuglset ?'	Report		Stadium: Molde Stadion; Attendance: 3,715

22 August 1977 15	Viking	2–1	Molde	Stavanger
	Unknown ?'; Unknown ?'	Report	Unknown ?'	Stadium: Stavanger Stadion; Attendance: 7,850

28 August 1977 16	Molde	2–0	Rosenborg	Molde
	Fuglset 37'; H. Hestad 75'	Report		Stadium: Molde Stadion; Attendance: 4,450

11 September 1977 17	Start	1–2	Molde	Kristiansand
	Unknown ?'	Report	de Geer ?'; Bjørnå ?'	Stadium: Kristiansand Stadion; Attendance: 5,767

18 September 1977 18	Molde	3–1	Moss	Molde
	Fuglset ?' (pen.); Unknown ?' (o.g.); Hareide ?'	Report	Unknown ?'	Stadium: Molde Stadion; Attendance: 3,379

25 September 1977 12	Lillestrøm	3–0	Molde	Lillestrøm
	Unknown ?'; Unknown ?'; Unknown ?'	Report		Stadium: Åråsen Stadion; Attendance: 7,345

2 October 1977 19	Molde	1–0	Brann	Molde
	Hareide 32'	Report		Stadium: Molde Stadion; Attendance: 3,782

9 October 1977 21	Bodø/Glimt	4–1	Molde	Bodø
	Unknown ?'; Unknown ?'; Unknown ?'; Unknown ?'	Report	Hareide ?'	Stadium: Aspmyra Stadion; Attendance: 8,865

16 October 1977 22	Molde	2–2	Bryne	Molde
	Oshaug ?'; Hareide ?'	Report	Unknown ?'; Unknown ?'	Stadium: Molde Stadion; Attendance: 4,316

==== Table ====
Pos	Team	Pld	W	D	L	GF	GA	GD	Pts	Qualification or relegation
1	Lillestrøm (C)	22	16	4	2	42	11	+31	36	Qualification for the European Cup first round
2	Bodø/Glimt	22	10	8	4	33	24	+9	28	Qualification for the Cup Winners' Cup first round
3	Molde	22	12	3	7	31	28	+3	27	Qualification for the UEFA Cup first round
4	Start	22	9	7	6	37	30	+7	25	Qualification for the UEFA Cup first round
5	Viking	22	9	5	8	41	34	+7	23	
6	Brann	22	8	6	8	40	35	+5	22	
7	Vålerengen	22	8	4	10	37	37	0	20	
8	Bryne	22	6	8	8	36	36	0	20	
9	Moss	22	7	6	9	28	39	−11	20	
10	Hamarkameratene (R)	22	6	6	10	37	42	−5	18	Relegation to Second Division
11	Mjøndalen (R)	22	7	4	11	17	32	−15	18	Relegation to Second Division
12	Rosenborg (R)	22	1	5	16	17	48	−31	7	Relegation to Second Division

Source: NIFS
Rules for classification: 1) points; 2) goal difference; 3) number of goals scored.
(C) Champions; (R) Relegated

=== Norwegian Cup ===
8 June 1977 First round	Rollon	2–1	Molde	Ålesund
	Thorsen ?'; Eidskrem 13'	Report	Fuglset ?'	Stadium: Aksla Stadion; Attendance: 600

== Squad statistics ==
=== Appearances and goals ===
Lacking information:

- One goalscorer from 1. divisjon round 15 (away against Viking) is missing.
- Appearance statistics from Norwegian Cup round 1 (against Rollon) is missing.

No.	Pos	Nat	Player	Total		1. divisjon		Norwegian Cup	
No.	Pos	Nat	Player	Apps	Goals	Apps	Goals	Apps	Goals
	GK	(Norway) NOR	Torleif Bergsås	1	0	0+1	0	0	0
	GK	(Norway) NOR	Inge Bratteteig	22	0	22	0	0	0
	DF	(Norway) NOR	Stål Bjørkly	15	0	15	0	0	0
	DF	(Norway) NOR	Torkild Brakstad	16	0	16	0	0	0
	DF	(Norway) NOR	Svein Kanestrøm	21	0	21	0	0	0
	DF	(Norway) NOR	Einar Sekkeseter	21	2	21	2	0	0
	DF	(Norway) NOR	Bertil Stranden	12	0	10+2	0	0	0
	MF	(Norway) NOR	Knut Bjørnå	17	1	16+1	1	0	0
	MF	(Norway) NOR	Åge Hareide	21	7	19+2	7	0	0
	MF	(Norway) NOR	Arild Haukaas	7	0	3+4	0	0	0
	MF	(Norway) NOR	Kjell Westerdahl	18	0	18	0	0	0
	FW	(Norway) NOR	Jan Fuglset	23	9	22	8	1	1
	FW	(Netherlands) NED	Boudewijn de Geer	9	2	8+1	2	0	0
	FW	(Norway) NOR	Harry Hestad	22	4	22	4	0	0
	FW	(Norway) NOR	Stein Olav Hestad	22	2	22	2	0	0
	FW	(Norway) NOR	Odd Ivar Moen	10	1	4+6	1	0	0
	FW	(Norway) NOR	Bjørner Oshaug	7	1	1+6	1	0	0

=== Goalscorers ===
Rank	Position	Nat.	Player	1. divisjon	Norwegian Cup	Total
1	FW	(Norway)	Jan Fuglset	8	1	9
2	MF	(Norway)	Åge Hareide	7	0	7
3	FW	(Norway)	Harry Hestad	4	0	4
4	FW	(Netherlands)	Boudewijn de Geer	2	0	2
4	FW	(Norway)	Stein Olav Hestad	2	0	2
4	DF	(Norway)	Einar Sekkeseter	2	0	2
7	MF	(Norway)	Knut Bjørnå	1	0	1
7	FW	(Norway)	Odd Ivar Moen	1	0	1
7	FW	(Norway)	Bjørner Oshaug	1	0	1
			Unknown	1	0	1
			Own goals	2	0	2
			TOTALS	31	1	32

== See also ==
- Molde FK seasons
