= 1975 Molde FK season =

Molde
1975 season
- Chairman: Jon Hoem
- Coach: Jack Johnsen
- Stadium: Molde Stadion
- 1. divisjon: 8th
- Norwegian Cup: Third round vs Aalesund
- UEFA Cup: First Round vs Öster
- Top goalscorer: Jan Fuglset (8)
- Highest home attendance: 5,200 vs Rosenborg (12 May 1975)
- Lowest home attendance: 2,669 vs Vålerenga (10 August 1975)
- Average home league attendance: 3,805
Home colours

The 1975 season was Molde's 2nd consecutive year in the top flight, and their 4th season in total in the top flight of Norwegian football.

This season, Molde debuted in European competitions. The team qualified for the 1975–76 UEFA Cup through their second-place finish in the 1974 1. divisjon and made their debut in UEFA competitions this season. The first European game was played against Swedish team Öster at home at Molde Stadion on 17 September 1975. Molde won the game 1–0.

== Squad ==
Note: Flags indicate national team as defined under FIFA eligibility rules; some limited exceptions apply. Players may hold more than one non-FIFA nationality.

No.	Pos.	Nation	Player
—	GK	NOR	Torleif Bergsås
—	GK	NOR	Kolbjørn Sylthe
—	DF	NOR	Erik Brakstad
—	DF	NOR	Stål Bjørkly
—	DF	NOR	Åge Hareide
—	DF	NOR	Svein Kanestrøm
—	DF	NOR	Bernt Roald
—	DF	NOR	Einar Sekkeseter
—	DF	NOR	Bertil Stranden
—	MF	NOR	Knut Bjørnå
—	MF	NOR	Torkild Brakstad
—	MF	NOR	Stein Olav Hestad

No.	Pos.	Nation	Player
—	MF	NOR	Ole Bjørn Kavli
—	MF	NOR	Kjell Westerdahl
—	FW	NOR	Odd Berg
—	FW	NOR	Jan Fuglset
—	FW	NOR	Harry Hestad
—		NOR	Tor Åram
—		NOR	Arild Haukås
—		NOR	Jan Magne Lønsethagen
—		NOR	Odd Ivar Moen
—		NOR	Endre Vågan
—		NOR	Oddvar Vassmo

== Friendlies ==
1 March 1975	Skarbøvik	0–3	Molde	Ålesund
			Goal	Stadium: Skarbøvik stadion

9 March 1975	Molde	0–0	Clausenengen	Molde

16 March 1975	Varegg	0–5	Molde	Bergen
			Goal

5 April 1975	Molde	2–2	Aalesund	Molde
	Goal		Goal

8 April 1975	Sunndal	0–2	Molde
			Goal

12 April 1975	Hamarkameratene	0–1	Molde
			Goal

13 April 1975	Hødd	0–3	Molde
			Goal

20 April 1975	Molde	0–1	Skeid
		Summary	Goal

== Competitions ==
=== 1. divisjon ===
==== Results summary ====
Overall								Home								Away							
Pld	W	D	L	GF	GA	GD	Pts	Pld	W	D	L	GF	GA	GD	Pts	Pld	W	D	L	GF	GA	GD	Pts
22	7	8	7	27	29	–2	22	11	3	3	5	9	14	–5	9	11	4	5	2	18	15	+3	13

==== Positions by round ====
Round	1	2	3	4	5	6	7	8	9	10	11	12	13	14	15	16	17	18	19	20	21	22
Ground	A	H	A	H	A	H	A	H	H	A	H	H	A	H	A	H	A	H	A	A	H	A
Result	D	L	W	W	W	W	D	L	W	L	L	L	W	D	L	L	W	D	D	D	D	D
Position	4	9	6	5	4	3	4	5	4	5	7	7	7	7	7	9	8	8	8	8	8	8

Source: see below

==== Results ====
27 April 1975 1	Mjøndalen	1–1	Molde	Mjøndalen
	Solberg		Fuglset; Berg (yellow card); H. Hestad (yellow card)	Stadium: Nedre Eiker Stadion; Attendance: 4,400

3 May 1975 2	Molde	1–2	Lillestrøm	Molde
	Fuglset		Goal	Stadium: Molde Stadion; Attendance: 4,533

7 May 1975 3	Vålerengen	0–2	Molde	Oslo
			T. Brakstad; Fuglset	Stadium: Bislett Stadion; Attendance: 6,237

12 May 1975 4	Molde	1–0	Rosenborg	Molde
	S. Hestad			Stadium: Molde Stadion; Attendance: 5,200

19 May 1975 5	Brann	0–2	Molde	Bergen
			H. Hestad (yellow card); S. Hestad; Bjørkly (yellow card)	Stadium: Brann Stadion; Attendance: 12,700

22 May 1975 6	Molde	2–1	Viking	Molde
	H.Hestad; T. Brakstad pen.'		Goal	Stadium: Molde Stadion; Attendance: 2,784

25 May 1975 7	Strømsgodset	1–1	Molde	Drammen
	12' (pen.)		Own goal	Stadium: Marienlyst; Attendance: 14,358

1 June 1975 8	Molde	0–2	Fredrikstad	Molde
			Goal	Stadium: Molde Stadion; Attendance: 4,904

4 June 1975 9	Molde	1–0	Os	Molde
	T. Brakstad pen.'			Stadium: Molde Stadion; Attendance: 3,393

14 June 1975 10	Start	3–1	Molde	Kristiansand
	Goal		Fuglset	Stadium: Kristiansand Stadion; Attendance: 5,073

22 June 1975 11	Molde	0–1	Skeid	Molde
			Goal	Stadium: Molde Stadion; Attendance: 3,432

27 July 1975 12	Molde	0–2	Mjøndalen	Molde
			Goal	Stadium: Molde Stadion; Attendance: 3,038

3 August 1975 13	Lillestrøm	1–2	Molde	Lillestrøm
	Goal		Moen; H. Hestad	Stadium: Åråsen Stadion; Attendance: 5,100

10 August 1975 14	Molde	0–0	Vålerengen	Molde
				Stadium: Molde Stadion; Attendance: 2,669

25 August 1975 15	Rosenborg	3–2	Molde	Trondheim
	Øyasæther 5'; Iversen 30'; Farstad 62'		T. Brakstad 22'; Fuglset 38'	Stadium: Lerkendal Stadion; Attendance: 11,000

31 August 1975 16	Molde	1–3	Brann	Molde
	Berg		Goal	Stadium: Molde Stadion; Attendance: 4,000

13 September 1975 17	Viking	1–2	Molde	Stavanger
	Goal		Hareide; Fuglset	Stadium: Stavanger Stadion; Attendance: 9,223

21 September 1975 18	Molde	2–2	Strømsgodset	Molde
	Westerdahl; Fuglset		Goal	Stadium: Molde Stadion; Attendance: 4,507

28 September 1975 19	Fredrikstad	2–2	Molde	Fredrikstad
	Goal		Fuglset; S. Hestad	Stadium: Fredrikstad Stadion; Attendance: 4,356

5 October 1975 20	Os	1–1	Molde	Os
	Goal		Hareide 83'	Stadium: Kuventræ Stadion; Attendance: 1,500

13 October 1975 21	Molde	1–1	Start	Molde
	Hareide 80'		Goal	Stadium: Molde Stadion; Attendance: 3,394

19 October 1975 22	Skeid	2–2	Molde	Oslo
	Goal		Moen; Moen	Stadium: Ullevaal Stadion; Attendance: 1,183

==== Table ====
Pos	Team	Pld	W	D	L	GF	GA	GD	Pts	Qualification or relegation
6	Mjøndalen	22	9	6	7	21	21	0	24	
7	Lillestrøm	22	10	3	9	27	20	+7	23	
8	Molde	22	7	8	7	27	29	−2	22	
9	Fredrikstad	22	8	6	8	31	35	−4	22	
10	Skeid (R)	22	5	7	10	18	23	−5	17	Relegation to Second Division

Source: NIFS
Rules for classification: 1) points; 2) goal difference; 3) number of goals scored.
(R) Relegated

=== Norwegian Cup ===
28 May 1975 First Round	Aksla	0–10	Molde	Ålesund
			Berg; Berg; Berg; H. Hestad; H. Hestad; H. Hestad; Bergsås pen.' S. Hestad; S. Hestad; Haukaas	Stadium: Aksla Stadion

11 June 1975 Second Round	Molde	5–0	Skarbøvik	Molde
	H. Hestad; H. Hestad; T. Brakstad; Berg; Own goal			Stadium: Molde Stadion; Attendance: 5,073

25 June 1975 Third Round	Aalesund	1–0	Molde	Ålesund
	Goal

=== UEFA Cup ===
==== First round ====
17 September 1975 First Round 1st Leg	Molde (Norway)	1–0	(Sweden) Öster	Molde
	Westerdahl 70'	Report		Stadium: Molde Stadion; Attendance: 4,507

1 October 1975 First Round 2nd Leg	Öster (Sweden)	6–0 (6–1 agg.)	(Norway) Molde	Växjö, Sweden
	Svensson 32'; Mattsson 60', 82'; Evesson 67'; Ejderstedt 75'; Isaksson 90'	Report		Stadium: Värendsvallen

== Squad statistics ==
=== Goal scorers ===
Rank	Pos.	Nat.	Player	1. divisjon	Norwegian Cup	UEFA Cup	Total
1	FW	(Norway)	Jan Fuglset	8	0	0	8
1	FW	(Norway)	Harry Hestad	3	5	0	8
3	MF	(Norway)	Torkild Brakstad	4	1	0	5
3	MF	(Norway)	Stein Olav Hestad	3	2	0	5
3	FW	(Norway)	Odd Berg	1	4	0	5
6	DF	(Norway)	Åge Hareide	3	0	0	3
6		(Norway)	Odd Ivar Moen	3	0	0	3
8	MF	(Norway)	Kjell Westerdahl	1	0	1	2
9	GK	(Norway)	Torleif Bergsås	0	1	0	1
9		(Norway)	Arild Haukaas	0	1	0	1
			Own goal	1	1	0	2
TOTALS				27	15	1	43

== See also ==
- Molde FK seasons
