= 1982 Molde FK season =

Molde
1982 season
- Chairman: Bernt Roald
- Head coach: Jan Fuglset
- Stadium: Molde Stadion
- 1. divisjon: 12th (relegated)
- Norwegian Cup: Runners-up
- Top goalscorer: League: Jan Berg (7); All: Jan Berg (9)
- Highest home attendance: 5,100 vs Bryne (16 May 1982)
- Lowest home attendance: 500 vs Åndalsnes (27 May 1982)
- Average home league attendance: 3,145

The 1982 season was Molde's 9th season in the top flight of Norwegian football and their first since their promotion from 2. divisjon in 1981. This season Molde competed in 1. divisjon (first tier) and the Norwegian Cup.

In the league, Molde finished in 12th position, 13 points behind winners Viking and were relegated to 2. divisjon.

Molde participated in the 1982 Norwegian Cup. On 19 September, they reached the first final in club history after their 1–0 win away against Viking at Stavanger Stadion. The team lost the final 2–3 against Brann at Ullevaal Stadion on 24 October. Rune Ulvestad and Steinar Henden scored Molde's goals in the final.

== Squad ==
Source: Note: Flags indicate national team as defined under FIFA eligibility rules; some limited exceptions apply. Players may hold more than one non-FIFA nationality.

No.	Pos.	Nation	Player
—	GK	NOR	Inge Bratteteig
—	GK	NOR	Stein Hagen
—	DF	NOR	Knut Hallvard Eikrem
—	DF	NOR	Tor Gunnar Hagbø
—	DF	NOR	Åge Hareide
—	DF	NOR	Ivar Helge Mittet
—	DF	NOR	Ulrich Møller (Captain)
—	DF	NOR	Einar Sekkeseter
—	DF	NOR	Bertil Stranden
—	MF	NOR	Per Arne Aase
—	MF	NOR	Jan Berg
—	MF	NOR	Stein Olav Hestad
—	MF	NOR	Leidulf Lyngstad

No.	Pos.	Nation	Player
—	MF	NOR	Geir Malmedal
—	MF	NOR	Knut Nesbø
—	FW	NOR	Steinar Henden
—	FW	NOR	Lars Tennfjord
—	FW	NOR	Rune Ulvestad
—		NOR	Stein Erik Blikås
—		NOR	Ove Heggem
—		NOR	Tore Nundal
—		NOR	Stig Monsen
—		NOR	Terje Sorthe
—		NOR	Ståle Stavem
—		NOR	Frank Tore Tangen
—		NOR	Hermod Thrana

== Friendlies ==
28 February 1982	Træff	0–0	Molde	Molde
CET (UTC+1)		Report		Stadium: Lubbenes kunstgress

6 March 1982	Molde	3–1	Aalesund	Molde
CET (UTC+1)	Goal	Report	Goal	Stadium: Lubbenes kunstgress

13 March 1982	Molde	1–0	Steinkjer	Molde
CET (UTC+1)	Goal	Report		Stadium: Lubbenes kunstgress

20 March 1982	Molde	3–1	Raufoss	Eresfjord
CET (UTC+1)	Goal	Report	Goal

21 March 1982	Brattvåg	2–3	Molde	Fjørtoft
CET (UTC+1)	Goal	Report	Goal

27 March 1982	Rosenborg	4–2	Molde	Lade, Trondheim
CET (UTC+1)	Goal	Report	Goal

2 April 1982	Egersund	1–3	Molde	Egersund
CET (UTC+1)	Goal	Report	Goal

4 April 1982	Bryne	2–1	Molde	Bryne
CET (UTC+1)	Goal	Report	Goal

18 April 1982	Varegg	0–2	Molde	Bergen
CET (UTC+1)		Report	Goal

20 April 1982	Kristiansund	3–4	Molde	Kristiansund
CET (UTC+1)	Goal	Report	Goal

17 July 1982	Kvik Halden	0–1	Molde
CET (UTC+1)		Report	Goal
Note: Tippekamp

19 July 1982	Larkollen	0–5	Molde
CET (UTC+1)		Report	Goal

== Competitions ==
=== 1. divisjon ===
==== Results summary ====
Overall								Home								Away							
Pld	W	D	L	GF	GA	GD	Pts	Pld	W	D	L	GF	GA	GD	Pts	Pld	W	D	L	GF	GA	GD	Pts
22	4	8	10	26	41	–15	16	11	2	6	3	9	12	–3	10	11	2	2	7	17	29	–12	6

==== Positions by round ====
Round	1	2	3	4	5	6	7	8	9	10	11	12	13	14	15	16	17	18	19	20	21	22
Ground	A	H	A	H	A	H	H	A	H	A	H	H	A	H	A	H	A	A	H	A	H	A
Result	D	W	L	L	L	W	D	W	L	L	D	D	L	L	L	D	L	W	D	D	D	L
Position	6	3	6	8	10	9	9	8	9	10	10	10	11	11	11	11	12	11	11	12	11	12

Source: see below

==== Results ====
25 April 1982 1	Sogndal	1–1	Molde	Sogndalsfjøra
CET (UTC+1)	Aabrekk 24'	Report	Sekkeseter 48'	Stadium: Fosshaugane

2 May 1982 2	Molde	2–1	Lillestrøm	Molde
CET (UTC+1)	Hestad 46'; Sekkeseter 63'	Report	Lund 19'	Stadium: Molde Stadion; Attendance: 4,405

9 May 1982 3	HamKam	2–1	Molde	Hamar
CET (UTC+1)	Unknown 28'; Unknown 33'	Report	Berg 45'	Stadium: Briskeby

16 May 1982 4	Molde	0–1	Bryne	Molde
CET (UTC+1)		Report	Unknown 52'	Stadium: Molde Stadion; Attendance: 5,254

20 May 1982 5	Mjøndalen	4–1	Molde	Mjøndalen
CET (UTC+1)	Unknown 4'; Unknown 49'; Unknown 62'; Unknown 85'	Report	Berg 30'	Stadium: Nedre Eiker Stadion

24 May 1982 6	Molde	1–0	Moss	Molde
CET (UTC+1)	Stranden 22'	Report		Stadium: Molde Stadion; Attendance: 2,250

31 May 1982 7	Molde	1–1	Rosenborg	Molde
CET (UTC+1)	Berg 28'	Report	Ødegaard 65'	Stadium: Molde Stadion; Attendance: 4,980

7 June 1982 8	Vålerengen	1–2	Molde	Oslo
CET (UTC+1)	Unknown 25'	Report	Ulvestad 13'; Malmedal 81'	Stadium: Bislett Stadion; Attendance: 7,655

13 June 1982 9	Molde	1–3	Viking	Molde
CET (UTC+1)	Ulvestad 32'	Report	Unknown 58'; Unknown 69'; Unknown 89'	Stadium: Molde Stadion; Attendance: 2,900

27 June 1982 10	Fredrikstad	2–1	Molde	Fredrikstad
CET (UTC+1)	Unknown 33'; Unknown 47' (pen.)	Report	Malmedal 62' (pen.)	Stadium: Fredrikstad Stadion; Attendance: 2,854

30 June 1982 11	Molde	0–0	Start	Molde
CET (UTC+1)		Report		Stadium: Molde Stadion; Attendance: 1,550

3 August 1982 12	Molde	0–0	Sogndal	Molde
CET (UTC+1)		Report		Stadium: Molde Stadion; Attendance: 1,950

8 August 1982 13	Lillestrøm	7–4	Molde	Lillestrøm
CET (UTC+1)	Lund ?', ?'; Himanka ?', ?'; Giske 48'; Sjåstad 53', ?'	Report	Malmedal 34'; Hestad 35'; Berg 62'; Tennfjord 90'	Stadium: Åråsen Stadion; Attendance: 2,835

15 August 1982 14	Molde	1–3	HamKam	Molde
CET (UTC+1)	Hestad 54'	Report	Skjønsberg 8'; Unknown 43'; Unknown 79'	Stadium: Molde Stadion; Attendance: 2,570

18 August 1982 15	Bryne	3–2	Molde	Bryne
CET (UTC+1)	Unknown 18'; Høyland 28'; Unknown 55'	Report	Berg 11'; Henden 60'	Stadium: Bryne Stadion; Attendance: 1,750

22 August 1982 16	Molde	2–2	Mjøndalen	Molde
CET (UTC+1)	Hestad 56'; Møller ?'	Report	Unknown 36'; Unknown 65'	Stadium: Molde Stadion; Attendance: 2,025

29 August 1982 17	Moss	4–1	Molde	Moss
CET (UTC+1)	Unknown 27'; Unknown 34'; Unknown 80'; Kollshaugen 85'	Report	Hestad ?'	Stadium: Melløs Stadion; Attendance: 3,279

5 September 1982 18	Rosenborg	0–1	Molde	Trondheim
CET (UTC+1)		Report	Ulvestad 17'	Stadium: Lerkendal Stadion; Attendance: 3,130

12 September 1982 19	Molde	1–1	Vålerengen	Molde
CET (UTC+1)	Malmedal ?' (pen.)	Report	Unknown 9' (pen.)	Stadium: Molde Stadion; Attendance: 3,206

26 September 1982 20	Viking	1–1	Molde	Stavanger
CET (UTC+1)	Svendsen 62'	Report	Berg ?'	Stadium: Stavanger Stadion; Attendance: 5,672

3 October 1982 21	Molde	0–0	Fredrikstad	Molde
CET (UTC+1)		Report		Stadium: Molde Stadion; Attendance: 4,312

10 October 1982 22	Start	4–2	Molde	Kristiansand
CET (UTC+1)	Unknown 5'; Unknown 51'; Unknown 54'; Stranden 72' (o.g.)	Report	Berg 15'; Fuglset 38'	Stadium: Kristiansand Stadion; Attendance: 3,200

==== League table ====
Pos	Team	Pld	W	D	L	GF	GA	GD	Pts	Qualification or relegation
1	Viking (C)	22	11	7	4	39	24	+15	29	Qualification for the European Cup first round
2	Bryne	22	10	6	6	25	25	0	26	Qualification for the UEFA Cup first round
3	Lillestrøm	22	11	3	8	35	26	+9	25	
4	Vålerengen	22	10	4	8	35	21	+14	24	
5	Hamarkameratene	22	11	2	9	33	35	−2	24	
6	Rosenborg	22	7	9	6	32	29	+3	23	
7	Mjøndalen	22	9	5	8	28	32	−4	23	
8	Moss	22	6	8	8	27	26	+1	20	
9	Start	22	7	6	9	28	32	−4	20	
10	Fredrikstad (R)	22	5	8	9	22	31	−9	18	Qualification for the relegation play-offs
11	Sogndal (R)	22	5	6	11	25	33	−8	16	Relegation to 2. divisjon
12	Molde (R)	22	4	8	10	26	41	−15	16	Relegation to 2. divisjon

Source: NIFS
Rules for classification: 1) points; 2) goal difference; 3) number of goals scored.
(C) Champions; (R) Relegated

=== Norwegian Cup ===
27 May 1982 First round	Molde	3–0	Åndalsnes	Molde
CEST (UTC+2)	Berg 39'; Aase 74'; Sorthe 85'	Report		Stadium: Lubbenes Kunstgress; Attendance: 500

23 June 1982 Second round	Tornado	0–1	Molde	Måløy
CEST (UTC+2)		Report	Ulvestad 20'	Attendance: 400

7 July 1982 Third round	Molde	1–0	Sunndal	Molde
CEST (UTC+2)	Ulvestad 88'	Report		Stadium: Molde Stadion; Attendance: 640

25 July 1982 Fourth round	Sogndal	2–5 (a.e.t.)	Molde	Sogndalsfjøra
CEST (UTC+2)	Bakke 52'; Opseth 57'	Report	Tennfjord 15', 105', 117'; Henden 37'; Ulvestad 99'	Stadium: Fosshaugane; Attendance: 1,824; Referee: Reinar Bjørnestad (Sandviken)

25 August 1982 Quarter-finals	Molde	2–1 (a.e.t.)	Fredrikstad	Molde
CEST (UTC+2)	Ulvestad 47'; Hestad 112'	Report	Ahlsen 12' (pen.) (penalty missed) 105'	Stadium: Molde Stadion; Attendance: 3,572; Referee: Roald Håvåg (Baune)

19 September 1982 Semi-finals	Viking	0–1	Molde	Stavanger
18:00 CEST (UTC+2)		Report	Berg 52'	Stadium: Stavanger Stadion; Attendance: 11,176; Referee: Jan Erik Olsen (Drammens BK)

==== Final ====
24 October 1982
13:15 CEST (UTC+2)
Final

Brann	3–2	Molde
Austvik 17'; Dalhaug 42'; MacLeod 58'	Report	Ulvestad 21'; Henden 37'

Ullevaal Stadion, Oslo
Attendance: 24,000
Referee: Torbjørn Aass (Brage)

== Squad statistics ==
=== Appearances and goals ===
Lacking information:

- Appearance statistics from Norwegian Cup rounds 1–4 and semi-finals are missing.

No.	Pos	Nat	Player	Total		1. divisjon		Norwegian Cup	
No.	Pos	Nat	Player	Apps	Goals	Apps	Goals	Apps	Goals
	GK	(Norway) NOR	Inge Bratteteig	25	0	21	0	4	0
	GK	(Norway) NOR	Stein Hagen	1	0	1	0	0	0
	DF	(Norway) NOR	Tor Gunnar Hagbø	23	0	21	0	2	0
	DF	(Norway) NOR	Ivar Helge Mittet	11	0	8+1	0	2	0
	DF	(Norway) NOR	Ulrich Møller	25	1	21	1	4	0
	DF	(Norway) NOR	Einar Sekkeseter	6	2	4+1	2	0+1	0
	DF	(Norway) NOR	Bertil Stranden	25	1	22	1	3	0
	MF	(Norway) NOR	Per Arne Aase	22	1	16+2	0	3+1	1
	MF	(Norway) NOR	Jan Berg	27	9	22	7	5	2
	MF	(Norway) NOR	Stein Olav Hestad	25	6	20+1	5	4	1
	MF	(Norway) NOR	Leidulf Lyngstad	14	0	14	0	0	0
	MF	(Norway) NOR	Geir Malmedal	22	4	17+2	4	3	0
	FW	(Norway) NOR	Jan Fuglset	3	1	2	1	0+1	0
	FW	(Norway) NOR	Steinar Henden	17	5	9+4	1	4	4
	FW	(Norway) NOR	Lars Tennfjord	9	2	2+6	1	1	1
	FW	(Norway) NOR	Rune Ulvestad	23	8	16+1	3	6	5
		(Norway) NOR	Stein Erik Blikås	14	0	7+7	0	0	0
		(Norway) NOR	Stig Monsen	7	0	5	0	1+1	0
		(Norway) NOR	Terje Sorthe	12	1	7+4	0	1	1
		(Norway) NOR	Ståle Stavem	9	0	6+2	0	1	0

=== Goalscorers ===
Rank	Position	Nat.	Player	1. divisjon	Norwegian Cup	Total
1	MF	(Norway)	Jan Berg	7	2	9
2	FW	(Norway)	Rune Ulvestad	3	5	8
3	MF	(Norway)	Stein Olav Hestad	5	1	6
4	FW	(Norway)	Steinar Henden	1	4	5
5	MF	(Norway)	Geir Malmedal	4	0	4
6	DF	(Norway)	Einar Sekkeseter	2	0	2
6	FW	(Norway)	Lars Tennfjord	1	1	2
8	FW	(Norway)	Jan Fuglset	1	0	1
8	DF	(Norway)	Ulrich Møller	1	0	1
8	DF	(Norway)	Bertil Stranden	1	0	1
8	MF	(Norway)	Per Arne Aase	0	1	1
8		(Norway)	Terje Sorthe	0	1	1
			TOTALS	26	15	41

== See also ==
- Molde FK seasons
