= 1978 Molde FK season =

Molde
1978 season
- Chairman: Sigmund Heggem
- Coach: Huib Ruijgrok
- Stadium: Molde Stadion
- 1. divisjon: 10th (relegated)
- Norwegian Cup: Fourth round vs Rosenborg
- UEFA Cup: First round vs Torpedo Moscow
- Top goalscorer: League: Stein Olav Hestad (6); All: Stein Olav Hestad (10)
- Highest home attendance: 5,742 vs Bodø/Glimt (4 May 1978)
- Lowest home attendance: 1,183 vs Moss (24 June 1978)
- Average home league attendance: 2,784

The 1978 season was Molde's fifth consecutive year in the top flight, and their 7th season in total in the top flight of Norwegian football. This season Molde competed in 1. divisjon (first tier), the Norwegian Cup and the 1978–79 UEFA Cup.

In the league, Molde finished in 10th position, 21 points behind winners Start and were relegated to the 2. divisjon. Molde entered the first round of the 1978–79 UEFA Cup. On 27 September, they were eliminated by Torpedo Moscow with a 3–7 loss on aggregate.

== Squad ==
Note: Flags indicate national team as defined under FIFA eligibility rules; some limited exceptions apply. Players may hold more than one non-FIFA nationality.

No.	Pos.	Nation	Player
—	GK	(Norway) NOR	Torleif Bergsås
—	GK	(Norway) NOR	Inge Bratteteig
—	DF	(Norway) NOR	Stål Bjørkly
—	DF	(Norway) NOR	Erik Brakstad
—	DF	(Norway) NOR	Torkild Brakstad
—	DF	(Norway) NOR	Tor Gunnar Hagbø
—	DF	(Norway) NOR	Svein Kanestrøm
—	DF	(Norway) NOR	Einar Sekkeseter
—	DF	(Norway) NOR	Bertil Stranden
—	MF	(Norway) NOR	Per Arne Aase

No.	Pos.	Nation	Player
—	MF	(Norway) NOR	Knut Bjørnå
—	MF	(Norway) NOR	Åge Hareide
—	MF	(Norway) NOR	Arild Haukaas
—	MF	(Norway) NOR	Arnfinn Rye
—	FW	(Norway) NOR	Jan Fuglset
—	FW	(Norway) NOR	Stein Olav Hestad
—	FW	(Norway) NOR	Harry Hestad
—	FW	(Norway) NOR	Odd Ivar Moen
—	FW	(Norway) NOR	Bjørner Oshaug
—	FW	(Norway) NOR	Rune Ulvestad

== Friendlies ==
12 March 1978	Clausenengen	2–2	Molde
	Goal	Report	Goal

18 March 1978	Sunndal	1–0	Molde
	Goal	Report

25 March 1978	Steinkjer	0–3	Molde
		Report	Goal

27 March 1978	Molde	3–0	Rosenborg
	Goal	Report

1 April 1978	Hødd	1–0	Molde
	Goal	Report

8 April 1978	BUCB (Netherlands)	2–1	(Norway) Molde
	Goal	Report	Goal

11 April 1978	De Valkeniers (Netherlands)	1–7	(Norway) Molde
	Goal	Report	Goal

12 April 1978	De Jegers (Netherlands)	1–7	(Norway) Molde
	Goal	Report	Goal

13 April 1978	Delft (Netherlands)	0–1	(Norway) Molde
		Report	Goal

== Competitions ==
=== 1. divisjon ===
==== Results summary ====
Overall								Home								Away							
Pld	W	D	L	GF	GA	GD	Pts	Pld	W	D	L	GF	GA	GD	Pts	Pld	W	D	L	GF	GA	GD	Pts
22	5	2	15	36	58	–22	12	11	3	0	8	22	33	–11	6	11	2	2	7	14	25	–11	6

==== Table ====
Pos	Team	Pld	W	D	L	GF	GA	GD	Pts	Qualification or relegation
1	Start (C)	22	13	7	2	30	13	+17	33	Qualification for the European Cup first round
2	Lillestrøm	22	11	9	2	45	22	+23	31	Qualification for the Cup Winners' Cup preliminary round
3	Viking	22	12	7	3	42	22	+20	31	Qualification for the UEFA Cup first round
4	Skeid	22	12	2	8	38	33	+5	26	Qualification for the UEFA Cup first round
5	Brann	22	11	3	8	52	42	+10	25	
6	Vålerengen	22	9	6	7	44	34	+10	24	
7	Bryne	22	7	8	7	27	30	−3	22	
8	Moss	22	8	4	10	39	38	+1	20	
9	Bodø/Glimt	22	6	6	10	37	37	0	18	
10	Molde (R)	22	5	2	15	36	58	−22	12	Relegation to Second Division
11	Lyn (R)	22	3	5	14	23	53	−30	11	Relegation to Second Division
12	Steinkjer (R)	22	1	9	12	20	51	−31	11	Relegation to Second Division

Source: NIFS
Rules for classification: 1) points; 2) goal difference; 3) number of goals scored.
(C) Champions; (R) Relegated

=== Norwegian Cup ===
8 June 1978 First round	Molde	7–0	Dovre	Molde
	S. Hestad ?', ?', ?'; T. Brakstad ?'; Rye ?'; Hagbø ?'; H. Hestad ?'	Report		Stadium: Molde Stadion

1978 Second round	Brekken	1–2	Molde	Brekken, Røros Municipality
	Stranden ?' (o.g.)	Report	S. Hestad ?'; T. Brakstad ?'

26 July 1978 Third round	Molde	1–0	Tornado	Molde
	H. Hestad ?'	Report		Stadium: Molde Stadion

23 August 1978 Fourth round	Rosenborg	2–0	Molde	Trondheim
	Eggen 28'; Sundmoen 70'	Report		Stadium: Lerkendal Stadion; Attendance: 8,687

=== UEFA Cup ===
13 September 1978 First round 1st Leg	Torpedo Moscow (Soviet Union)	4–0	(Norway) Molde	Moscow, Soviet Union
	Vasiliev 5'; Mironov 35'; Grishin 78'; Suchilin 86'	Report		Stadium: Eduard Streltsov Stadium

27 September 1978 First round 2nd Leg	Molde (Norway)	3–3 (3–7 agg.)	(Soviet Union) Torpedo Moscow	Molde, Norway
	T. Brakstad 43'; Bjørnå 53'; Fuglset 67'	Report	Vasiliev 26', 71'; Suchilin 81'	Stadium: Molde Stadion; Attendance: 2,813

== Squad statistics ==
=== Appearances and goals ===
Lacking information:

- Appearance statistics from 1. divisjon round 4 (away against Start), round 11 (at home against Moss), round 20 (at home against Vålerengen) and one goalscorer from round 4 (away against Start) are missing.
- Appearance statistics from Norwegian Cup round 2 (against Brekken) and round 3 (against Tornado) are missing.

No.	Pos	Nat	Player	Total		1. divisjon		Norwegian Cup		UEFA Cup	
No.	Pos	Nat	Player	Apps	Goals	Apps	Goals	Apps	Goals	Apps	Goals
	GK	(Norway) NOR	Torleif Bergsås	7	0	5	0	1	0	1	0
	GK	(Norway) NOR	Inge Bratteteig	21	0	15+3	0	2	0	1	0
	DF	(Norway) NOR	Stål Bjørkly	12	0	11	0	0	0	1	0
	DF	(Norway) NOR	Erik Brakstad	6	0	3+2	0	1	0	0	0
	DF	(Norway) NOR	Torkild Brakstad	23	5	17	2	4	2	2	1
	DF	(Norway) NOR	Tor Gunnar Hagbø	9	2	5	1	1+1	1	0+2	0
	DF	(Norway) NOR	Svein Kanestrøm	13	0	7+3	0	0+2	0	1	0
	DF	(Norway) NOR	Einar Sekkeseter	16	4	14	4	1	0	1	0
	DF	(Norway) NOR	Bertil Stranden	24	0	18	0	4	0	2	0
	MF	(Norway) NOR	Per Arne Aase	5	0	2+1	0	1+1	0	0	0
	MF	(Norway) NOR	Knut Bjørnå	19	4	16	3	1	0	2	1
	MF	(Norway) NOR	Åge Hareide	17	2	14	2	2	0	1	0
	MF	(Norway) NOR	Arild Haukaas	3	0	3	0	0	0	0	0
	MF	(Norway) NOR	Arnfinn Rye	17	6	12+1	5	2	1	2	0
	FW	(Norway) NOR	Jan Fuglset	13	6	10	5	1	0	2	1
	FW	(Norway) NOR	Harry Hestad	15	2	11+1	0	2+1	2	0	0
	FW	(Norway) NOR	Stein Olav Hestad	23	10	18	6	3	4	2	0
	FW	(Norway) NOR	Odd Ivar Moen	19	3	12+3	3	2	0	2	0
	FW	(Norway) NOR	Bjørner Oshaug	6	0	1+3	0	2	0	0	0
	FW	(Norway) NOR	Rune Ulvestad	17	4	12+2	4	1	0	2	0

=== Goalscorers ===
Rank	Position	Nat.	Player	1. divisjon	Norwegian Cup	UEFA Cup	Total
1	FW	(Norway)	Stein Olav Hestad	6	4	0	10
2	MF	(Norway)	Arnfinn Rye	5	1	0	6
2	FW	(Norway)	Jan Fuglset	5	0	1	6
4	DF	(Norway)	Torkild Brakstad	2	2	1	5
5	DF	(Norway)	Einar Sekkeseter	4	0	0	4
5	FW	(Norway)	Rune Ulvestad	4	0	0	4
5	MF	(Norway)	Knut Bjørnå	3	0	1	4
8	FW	(Norway)	Odd Ivar Moen	3	0	0	3
9	MF	(Norway)	Åge Hareide	2	0	0	2
9	MF	(Norway)	Tor Gunnar Hagbø	1	1	0	2
9	FW	(Norway)	Harry Hestad	0	2	0	2
			Unknown	1	0	0	1
			TOTALS	36	10	3	49

== See also ==
- Molde FK seasons
