= 1974 Molde FK season =

Molde
1974 season
- Chairman: Jon Hoem
- Coaches: Joseph Hooley (until 19 May); Torkild Brakstad, Jan Fuglset, Harry Hestad (from 20 May)
- Stadium: Molde Stadion
- 1. divisjon: 2nd
- Norwegian Cup: Quarter-finals vs Brann
- Top goalscorer: Odd Berg (13)
- Highest home attendance: 9,800 vs Viking (22 September 1974)
- Lowest home attendance: 4,000 vs Sarpsborg (23 June 1974)
- Average home league attendance: 5,294

The 1974 season was Molde's first year back in the top flight after their promotion from the 1973 2. divisjon, and their 3rd season in total in the top flight of Norwegian football.

This season, Molde competed in 1. divisjon and the 1974 Norwegian Football Cup. Molde finished as runners-up in the league, one point behind winners Viking.

== Squad ==
Note: Flags indicate national team as defined under FIFA eligibility rules; some limited exceptions apply. Players may hold more than one non-FIFA nationality.

| No. | Pos. | Nation | Player |
|---|---|---|---|
| — | GK | (Norway) NOR | Torleif Bergsås |
| — | GK | (Norway) NOR | Kolbjørn Sylthe |
| — | DF | (Norway) NOR | Erik Brakstad |
| — | DF | (Norway) NOR | Stål Bjørkly |
| — | DF | (Norway) NOR | Svein Kanestrøm |
| — | DF | (Norway) NOR | Bernt Roald |
| — | DF | (Norway) NOR | Einar Sekkeseter |
| — | DF | (Norway) NOR | Bertil Stranden |
| — | MF | (Norway) NOR | Knut Bjørnå |
| — | MF | (Norway) NOR | Torkild Brakstad |
| — | MF | (Norway) NOR | Stein Olav Hestad |

| No. | Pos. | Nation | Player |
|---|---|---|---|
| — | MF | (Norway) NOR | Ole Bjørn Kavli |
| — | MF | (Norway) NOR | Kjell Westerdahl |
| — | FW | (Norway) NOR | Odd Berg |
| — | FW | (Norway) NOR | Jan Fuglset |
| — | FW | (Norway) NOR | Harry Hestad |
| — | FW | (Norway) NOR | Bjørner Oshaug |
| — | | (Norway) NOR | Tore Hagh |
| — | | (Norway) NOR | Arild Haukaas |
| — | | (Norway) NOR | Jan Magne Lønsethagen |
| — | | (Norway) NOR | Odd Ivar Moen |

== Friendlies ==
| 13 January 1974 | Clausenengen | 0–1 | Molde |
| | | Report | Goal |

| 20 January 1974 | Aalesund | 1–5 | Molde |
| | Goal | Report | Goal |

| 3 February 1974 | Sunndal | 0–2 | Molde |
| | | Report | Goal |

| 24 February 1974 | Molde | 9–0 | Åndalsnes |
| | Goal | Report |

| 7 March 1974 | Molde | 3–1 | Langevåg |
| | Goal | Report | Goal |

| 24 March 1974 | Clausenengen | 2–3 | Molde |
| | Goal | Report | Goal |

| 31 March 1974 | Molde | 1–0 | Strømsgodset |
| | Goal | Report |

| 7 April 1974 | Molde | 2–1 | Mo |
| | Goal | Report | Goal |

| 15 April 1974 | Viking | 1–0 | Molde |
| | Goal | Report |

| 19 April 1974 | Molde | 1–1 | Steinkjer |
| | Goal | Report | Goal |

== Competitions ==
=== 1. divisjon ===
==== Results summary ====
| Overall | | | | | | | | Home | | | | | | | | Away | | | | | | | |
| Pld | W | D | L | GF | GA | GD | Pts | Pld | W | D | L | GF | GA | GD | Pts | Pld | W | D | L | GF | GA | GD | Pts |
|---|---|---|---|---|---|---|---|---|---|---|---|---|---|---|---|---|---|---|---|---|---|---|---|
| 22 | 12 | 6 | 4 | 40 | 18 | +22 | 30 | 11 | 7 | 2 | 2 | 23 | 9 | +14 | 16 | 11 | 5 | 4 | 2 | 17 | 9 | +8 | 14 |

==== Positions by round ====
| Round | 1 | 2 | 3 | 4 | 5 | 6 | 7 | 8 | 9 | 10 | 11 | 12 | 13 | 14 | 15 | 16 | 17 | 18 | 19 | 20 | 21 | 22 |
|---|---|---|---|---|---|---|---|---|---|---|---|---|---|---|---|---|---|---|---|---|---|---|
| Ground | H | A | H | A | H | A | H | A | H | A | H | A | H | A | H | A | H | A | H | A | H | A |
| Result | W | W | W | L | L | D | W | D | D | D | W | W | W | W | W | W | W | D | L | L | D | W |
| Position | 4 | 1 | 1 | 3 | 3 | 5 | 4 | 3 | 4 | 5 | 3 | 2 | 1 | 1 | 1 | 1 | 1 | 1 | 1 | 2 | 2 | 2 |

Source: see below

==== Results ====
| 28 April 1974 1 | Molde | 2–1 | Raufoss | Molde |
| | H. Hestad ?'; Berg ?' | Report | Unknown ?' | Stadium: Molde Stadion; Attendance: 4,500 |

| 6 May 1974 2 | Brann | 0–4 | Molde | Bergen |
| | | Report | Hagh ?'; S. Hestad ?'; H. Hestad ?'; Berg ?' | Stadium: Brann Stadion; Attendance: 13,500 |

| 12 May 1974 3 | Molde | 2–0 | Mjøndalen | Molde |
| | H. Hestad ?'; Berg ?' | Report | | Stadium: Molde Stadion; Attendance: 5,700 |

| 15 May 1974 4 | Rosenborg | 2–1 | Molde | Trondheim |
| | Næss 30'; Iversen 57' | Report | Berg 54' | Stadium: Lerkendal Stadion; Attendance: 21,362 |

| 19 May 1974 5 | Molde | 0–1 | Skeid | Molde |
| | | Report | Unknown ?' | Stadium: Molde Stadion; Attendance: 5,000; Referee: Reidar Bjørnestad |

| 26 May 1974 6 | Hamarkameratene | 1–1 | Molde | Hamar |
| | Unknown ?' | Report | Berg ?' | Stadium: Briskeby; Attendance: 4,313 |

| 3 June 1974 7 | Molde | 3–0 | Start | Molde |
| | Berg ?', ?'; T. Brakstad ?' | Report | | Stadium: Molde Stadion; Attendance: 4,000 |

| 10 June 1974 8 | Viking | 0–0 | Molde | Stavanger |
| | | Report | | Stadium: Stavanger Stadion; Attendance: 11,500 |

| 12 June 1974 9 | Molde | 1–1 | Vålerengen | Molde |
| | Berg ?' | Report | Unknown ?' | Stadium: Molde Stadion; Attendance: 4,200 |

| 16 June 1974 10 | Strømsgodset | 2–2 | Molde | Drammen |
| | Unknown ?'; Unknown ?' | Report | Fuglset ?', ?' | Stadium: Marienlyst Stadion; Attendance: 5,300 |

| 23 June 1974 11 | Molde | 5–1 | Sarpsborg | Molde |
| | Fuglset ?', ?'; Berg ?'; T. Brakstad ?'; H. Hestad ?' | Report | Unknown ?' | Stadium: Molde Stadion; Attendance: 4,000 |

| 28 July 1974 12 | Raufoss | 0–1 | Molde | Raufoss |
| | | Report | H. Hestad ?' | Stadium: Raufoss Stadion; Attendance: 1,786 |

| 4 August 1974 13 | Molde | 1–0 | Brann | Molde |
| | Berg ?' | Report | | Stadium: Molde Stadion; Attendance: 7,500 |

| 11 August 1974 14 | Mjøndalen | 0–2 | Molde | Mjøndalen |
| | | Report | Berg ?', ?' | Stadium: Nedre Eiker Stadion; Attendance: 3,650 |

| 21 August 1974 15 | Molde | 2–1 | Rosenborg | Molde |
| | H. Hestad 21'; S. Hestad 49' | Report | Didrichsen 39' | Stadium: Molde Stadion; Attendance: 4,000 |

| 27 August 1974 16 | Skeid | 0–2 | Molde | Oslo |
| | | Report | Fuglset ?'; H. Hestad ?' | Stadium: Ullevaal Stadion; Attendance: 7,366 |

| 1 September 1974 17 | Molde | 5–0 | Hamarkameratene | Molde |
| | Fuglset ?', ?', ?'; Berg ?'; S. Hestad ?' | Report | | Stadium: Molde Stadion; Attendance: 4,800 |

| 8 September 1974 18 | Start | 0–0 | Molde | Kristiansand |
| | | Report | | Stadium: Kristiansand Stadion; Attendance: 7,259 |

| 22 September 1974 19 | Molde | 0–2 | Viking | Molde |
| | | Report | Unknown ?'; Unknown ?' | Stadium: Molde Stadion; Attendance: 9,800 |

| 29 September 1974 20 | Vålerengen | 4–3 | Molde | Oslo |
| | Unknown; Unknown; Unknown; Unknown | Report | Fuglset ?' (?); H. Hestad | Stadium: Bislett Stadion; Attendance: 10,709 |

| 6 October 1974 21 | Molde | 2–2 | Strømsgodset | Molde |
| | Fuglset ?'; H. Hestad ?' | Report | Unknown ?'; Unknown ?' | Stadium: Molde Stadion; Attendance: 4,507 |

| 13 October 1974 22 | Sarpsborg | 0–1 | Molde | Sarpsborg |
| | | Report | H. Hestad ?' | Stadium: Sarpsborg Stadion; Attendance: 1,870 |

==== Table ====
| Pos | Team | Pld | W | D | L | GF | GA | GD | Pts | Qualification or relegation |
|---|---|---|---|---|---|---|---|---|---|---|
| 1 | Viking (C) | 22 | 11 | 9 | 2 | 31 | 10 | +21 | 31 | Qualification for the European Cup first round |
| 2 | Molde | 22 | 12 | 6 | 4 | 40 | 18 | +22 | 30 | Qualification for the UEFA Cup first round |
| 3 | Vålerengen | 22 | 12 | 4 | 6 | 33 | 25 | +8 | 28 | Qualification for the UEFA Cup first round |
| 4 | Brann | 22 | 9 | 9 | 4 | 36 | 20 | +16 | 27 | |
| 5 | Strømsgodset | 22 | 11 | 5 | 6 | 38 | 28 | +10 | 27 | |

Source: NIFS
Rules for classification: 1) points; 2) goal difference; 3) number of goals scored.
(C) Champions

=== Norwegian Cup ===
| 29 May 1974 First round | Molde | 3–0 | Åndalsnes |
| | Berg ?' (?); Fuglset ?' | Report |

| 19 June 1974 Second round | Kristiansund | 0–3 | Molde |
| | | Report | T. Brakstad ?'; Fuglset ?'; S. Hestad ?' |

| 25 June 1974 Third round | Molde | 4–0 | Ørsta |
| | Berg ?'; Fuglset ?' (?); Sekkeseter ?' | Report |

| 18 August 1974 Fourth round | Molde | 2–1 | Neset |
| | Fuglset ?'; S. Hestad ?' | Report | Unknown ?' |

| 8 September 1974 Quarter-finals | Brann | 2–1 | Molde | Bergen |
| | Aase 70'; Blindheim 89' | Report | Fuglset 88' | Stadium: Brann Stadion; Attendance: 17,500; Referee: Kaare Lindboe |

== Squad statistics ==
=== Goal scorers ===
| Rank | Pos. | Nat. | Player | 1. divisjon | Norwegian Cup | Total |
|---|---|---|---|---|---|---|
| 1 | FW | (Norway) | Jan Fuglset | 11 | 6 | 17 |
| 2 | FW | (Norway) | Odd Berg | 13 | 3 | 16 |
| 3 | FW | (Norway) | Harry Hestad | 10 | 0 | 10 |
| 4 | MF | (Norway) | Stein Olav Hestad | 3 | 2 | 5 |
| 5 | MF | (Norway) | Torkild Brakstad | 2 | 1 | 3 |
| 6 | | (Norway) | Tore Hagh | 1 | 0 | 1 |
| 6 | DF | (Norway) | Einar Sekkeseter | 0 | 1 | 1 |
| TOTALS | | | | 40 | 13 | 53 |

== See also ==
- Molde FK seasons
