= 1979 Molde FK season =

Molde
1979 season
- Chairman: Sigmund Heggem
- Head coach: Huib Ruijgrok
- Stadium: Molde Stadion
- 2. divisjon, group B: 2nd (promoted)
- Norwegian Cup: Fourth round vs. Bryne
- Top goalscorer: League: Stein Olav Hestad (11); All: Stein Olav Hestad (13)
- Highest home attendance: 4,520 vs Pors (14 October 1979)

The 1979 season was Molde's 19th season in the second tier of Norwegian football and their first since their relegation from 1. divisjon in 1978. This season, Molde competed in 2. divisjon (second tier), promotion play-offs and the Norwegian Cup.

In the league, Molde finished in 2nd position in 2. division group B, seven points behind winners Lyn and qualified for promotion play-offs. Molde won promotion to the 1980 1. divisjon after winning the play-offs 7–0 on aggregate against Pors.

Molde participated in the 1979 Norwegian Cup. Molde reached the fourth round, where they were eliminated by Bryne. Molde lost the fourth round 0–4 on away ground.

== Squad ==
Note: Flags indicate national team as defined under FIFA eligibility rules; some limited exceptions apply. Players may hold more than one non-FIFA nationality.

| No. | Pos. | Nation | Player |
|---|---|---|---|
| — | GK | (Norway) NOR | Inge Bratteteig |
| — | GK | (Norway) NOR | Roger Marhaug |
| — | DF | (Norway) NOR | Stål Bjørkly |
| — | DF | (Norway) NOR | Tor Gunnar Hagbø |
| — | DF | (Norway) NOR | Åge Hareide |
| — | DF | (Norway) NOR | Einar Sekkeseter |
| — | DF | (Norway) NOR | Bertil Stranden |
| — | MF | (Norway) NOR | Per Arne Aase |
| — | MF | (Norway) NOR | Knut Bjørnå |
| — | MF | (Norway) NOR | Stein Olav Hestad |

| No. | Pos. | Nation | Player |
|---|---|---|---|
| — | MF | (Norway) NOR | Leidulf Lyngstad |
| — | MF | (Norway) NOR | Knut Nesbø |
| — | MF | (Norway) NOR | Arnfinn Rye |
| — | FW | (Norway) NOR | Jan Fuglset |
| — | FW | (Norway) NOR | Lars Tennfjord |
| — | FW | (Norway) NOR | Rune Ulvestad |
| — | | (Norway) NOR | Tor Fuglset |
| — | | (Norway) NOR | Ståle Stavem |
| — | | (Norway) NOR | Per Vågan |

== Friendlies ==
| 17 February 1979 | Molde | 5–1 | Træff | Molde |
| CET (UTC+1) | Goal | Report | Goal |

| 24 February 1979 | Molde | 6–1 | Aalesund |
| CET (UTC+1) | Goal | Report | Goal |

| 3 March 1979 | Molde | 1–3 | Rosenborg |
| CET (UTC+1) | Goal | Report | Goal |

| 10 March 1979 | Molde | 2–3 | Bodø/Glimt |
| CET (UTC+1) | Goal | Report | Goal |

| 11 March 1979 | Molde | 4–0 | Steinkjer |
| CET (UTC+1) | Goal | Report |

| 24 March 1979 | Molde | 1–0 | Mjøndalen |
| CET (UTC+1) | Goal | Report |

| 1 April 1979 | Molde | 3–2 | Raufoss |
| CET (UTC+1) | Goal | Report | Goal |

| 8 April 1979 | Molde | 1–3 | Sunndal |
| CET (UTC+1) | Goal | Report | Goal |

| 11 April 1979 | Kristiansund | 2–2 | Molde |
| CET (UTC+1) | Goal | Report | Goal |

| 16 April 1979 | Rosenborg | 3–2 | Molde |
| CET (UTC+1) | Goal | Report | Goal |

| 22 April 1979 | Molde | 1–2 | Fredrikstad |
| CET (UTC+1) | Goal | Report | Goal |

== Competitions ==
=== 2. divisjon ===
==== Results summary ====
| Overall | | | | | | | | Home | | | | | | | | Away | | | | | | | |
| Pld | W | D | L | GF | GA | GD | Pts | Pld | W | D | L | GF | GA | GD | Pts | Pld | W | D | L | GF | GA | GD | Pts |
|---|---|---|---|---|---|---|---|---|---|---|---|---|---|---|---|---|---|---|---|---|---|---|---|
| 22 | 12 | 7 | 3 | 52 | 22 | +30 | 31 | 11 | 9 | 1 | 1 | 30 | 4 | +26 | 19 | 11 | 3 | 6 | 2 | 22 | 18 | +4 | 12 |

==== Positions by round ====
| Round | 1 | 2 | 3 | 4 | 5 | 6 | 7 | 8 | 9 | 10 | 11 | 12 | 13 | 14 | 15 | 16 | 17 | 18 | 19 | 20 | 21 | 22 |
|---|---|---|---|---|---|---|---|---|---|---|---|---|---|---|---|---|---|---|---|---|---|---|
| Ground | H | A | H | A | H | A | H | A | H | H | A | A | H | H | A | A | H | A | A | A | H | H |
| Result | W | W | L | L | W | D | W | D | W | W | W | D | D | W | D | W | W | D | L | D | W | W |
| Position | 1 | 1 | 2 | 3 | 2 | 3 | | 3 | 3 | 2 | 2 | 2 | 2 | 2 | 2 | 2 | 2 | 2 | 2 | 2 | 2 | 2 |

Source: see below

==== League table ====
| Pos | Team | Pld | W | D | L | GF | GA | GD | Pts | Promotion, qualification or relegation |
|---|---|---|---|---|---|---|---|---|---|---|
| 1 | Lyn (C, P) | 22 | 17 | 4 | 1 | 40 | 11 | +29 | 38 | Promotion to First Division |
| 2 | Molde (O, P) | 22 | 12 | 7 | 3 | 52 | 22 | +30 | 31 | Qualification for the promotion play-offs |
| 3 | Strindheim | 22 | 10 | 5 | 7 | 37 | 31 | +6 | 25 | |
| 4 | Frigg | 22 | 10 | 4 | 8 | 36 | 25 | +11 | 24 | |
| 5 | Hødd | 22 | 11 | 2 | 9 | 35 | 35 | 0 | 24 | |

Source: rsssf.no
Rules for classification: 1) points; 2) goal difference; 3) number of goals scored.
(C) Champions; (O) Play-off winners; (P) Promoted

=== Promotion play-offs ===
| 14 October 1979 Play-offs 1st Leg | Molde | 3–0 | Pors | Molde |
| CEST (UTC+2) | Ulvestad ?', ?'; H. Hestad ?' | Report | | Stadium: Molde Stadion; Attendance: 4,520 |

| 20 October 1979 Play-offs 2nd Leg | Pors | 0–4 (0–7 agg.) | Molde | Porsgrunn |
| CEST (UTC+2) | | Report | Ulvestad ?', ?'; Hareide ?'; Fuglset ?' (pen.) |

Molde won the promotion play-offs and were promoted to the 1. divisjon.

=== Norwegian Cup ===
| 1 June 1979 First round | Molde | 1–0 | Træff | Molde |
| CEST (UTC+2) | H. Hestad ?' (pen.) | Report |

| 4 July 1979 Second round | Kristiansund | 1–2 | Molde | Kristiansund |
| CEST (UTC+2) | Unknown ?' | Report | Fuglset ?', ?' | Stadium: Gressbanen |

| 25 July 1979 Third round | Molde | 4–2 | Skarbøvik | Molde |
| CEST (UTC+2) | S. Hestad 35', ?'; Fuglset ?', ?' | Report | Unknown ?'; Unknown ?' | Stadium: Molde Stadion |

| 12 August 1979 Fourth round | Bryne | 4–0 | Molde | Bryne |
| CEST (UTC+2) | Økland 10', 44', 48'; Hellvik 30' | Report | | Stadium: Bryne Stadion; Attendance: 2,118; Referee: Rolf Clausen |

== Squad statistics ==
=== Appearances and goals ===
Lacking information:

- Appearance statistics from league games in rounds 5–9 are missing.
- Two goalscorers from league games in round 7 (Stjørdals/Blink at home) and four goal scorers from round 14 (Nessegutten at home) are missing.
- Appearance statistics from Norwegian Cup round 1 (against Træff) are missing.

| No. | Pos | Nat | Player | Total | | 2. divisjon | | Norwegian Cup | | Promotion play-offs | |
| No. | Pos | Nat | Player | Apps | Goals | Apps | Goals | Apps | Goals | Apps | Goals |
|---|---|---|---|---|---|---|---|---|---|---|---|
| | GK | (Norway) NOR | Torleif Bergsås | 3 | 0 | 3 | 0 | 0 | 0 | 0 | 0 |
| | GK | (Norway) NOR | Inge Bratteteig | 13 | 0 | 10 | 0 | 3 | 0 | 0 | 0 |
| | GK | (Norway) NOR | Leif Arne Frostad | 4 | 0 | 3+1 | 0 | 0 | 0 | 0 | 0 |
| | GK | (Norway) NOR | Roger Marhaug | 4 | 0 | 2 | 0 | 0 | 0 | 2 | 0 |
| | DF | (Norway) NOR | Stål Bjørkly | 15 | 0 | 13 | 0 | 2 | 0 | 0 | 0 |
| | DF | (Norway) NOR | Tor Gunnar Hagbø | 13 | 0 | 7+2 | 0 | 2+1 | 0 | 0+1 | 0 |
| | DF | (Norway) NOR | Åge Hareide | 19 | 8 | 15 | 7 | 2 | 0 | 2 | 1 |
| | DF | (Norway) NOR | Einar Sekkeseter | 23 | 4 | 18 | 4 | 3 | 0 | 2 | 0 |
| | DF | (Norway) NOR | Bertil Stranden | 22 | 2 | 17 | 2 | 3 | 0 | 2 | 0 |
| | MF | (Norway) NOR | Per Arne Aase | 19 | 0 | 14 | 0 | 3 | 0 | 2 | 0 |
| | MF | (Norway) NOR | Knut Bjørnå | 20 | 1 | 17 | 1 | 3 | 0 | 0 | 0 |
| | MF | (Norway) NOR | Harry Hestad | 25 | 7 | 18+1 | 5 | 4 | 1 | 2 | 1 |
| | MF | (Norway) NOR | Stein Olav Hestad | 25 | 13 | 20 | 11 | 3 | 2 | 2 | 0 |
| | MF | (Norway) NOR | Leidulf Lyngstad | 2 | 0 | 1+1 | 0 | 0 | 0 | 0 | 0 |
| | MF | (Norway) NOR | Odd Ivar Moen | 12 | 1 | 8+1 | 1 | 0+1 | 0 | 2 | 0 |
| | MF | (Norway) NOR | Knut Nesbø | 5 | 0 | 3 | 0 | 0 | 0 | 2 | 0 |
| | MF | (Norway) NOR | Arnfinn Rye | 17 | 1 | 8+7 | 1 | 1+1 | 0 | 0 | 0 |
| | FW | (Norway) NOR | Jan Fuglset | 21 | 11 | 16 | 6 | 3 | 4 | 2 | 1 |
| | FW | (Norway) NOR | Lars Tennfjord | 5 | 1 | 1+3 | 1 | 0 | 0 | 0+1 | 0 |
| | FW | (Norway) NOR | Rune Ulvestad | 20 | 10 | 12+3 | 6 | 3 | 0 | 2 | 4 |
| | | (Norway) NOR | Jo Nesbø | 4 | 0 | 1+2 | 0 | 0+1 | 0 | 0 | 0 |
| | | (Norway) NOR | Kjell Arne Rød | 2 | 0 | 1+1 | 0 | 0 | 0 | 0 | 0 |
| | | (Norway) NOR | Terje Rye | 1 | 0 | 0+1 | 0 | 0 | 0 | 0 | 0 |
| | | (Norway) NOR | Ståle Stavem | 3 | 0 | 2+1 | 0 | 0 | 0 | 0 | 0 |

=== Goalscorers ===
| Rank | Position | Nat. | Player | 1. divisjon | Norwegian Cup | Promotion play-offs | Total |
|---|---|---|---|---|---|---|---|
| 1 | MF | (Norway) | Stein Olav Hestad | 11 | 2 | 0 | 13 |
| 2 | FW | (Norway) | Jan Fuglset | 6 | 4 | 1 | 11 |
| 3 | FW | (Norway) | Rune Ulvestad | 6 | 0 | 4 | 10 |
| 4 | DF | (Norway) | Åge Hareide | 7 | 0 | 1 | 8 |
| 5 | MF | (Norway) | Harry Hestad | 5 | 1 | 1 | 7 |
| 6 | DF | (Norway) | Einar Sekkeseter | 4 | 0 | 0 | 4 |
| 7 | DF | (Norway) | Bertil Stranden | 2 | 0 | 0 | 2 |
| 8 | MF | (Norway) | Knut Bjørnå | 1 | 0 | 0 | 1 |
| 8 | MF | (Norway) | Odd Ivar Moen | 1 | 0 | 0 | 1 |
| 8 | MF | (Norway) | Arnfinn Rye | 1 | 0 | 0 | 1 |
| 8 | FW | (Norway) | Lars Tennfjord | 1 | 0 | 0 | 1 |
| | | | Unknown | 6 | 0 | 0 | 6 |
| | | | Own goal | 1 | 0 | 0 | 1 |
| | | | TOTALS | 52 | 7 | 7 | 66 |

== See also ==
- Molde FK seasons
