= 1976 Norwegian First Division =

32nd season of top-tier football league in Norway

1. divisjon
- Season: 1976
- Dates: 25 April – 17 October
- Champions: Lillestrøm; 2nd title
- Relegated: Strømsgodset; Fredrikstad; Vard
- European Cup: Lillestrøm
- Cup Winners' Cup: Brann
- UEFA Cup: Mjøndalen; Start
- Matches played: 132
- Goals scored: 362 (2.74 per match)
- Top goalscorer: Jan Fuglset (17 goals)
- Biggest home win: HamKam 6–0 Bryne (20 June 1976)
- Biggest away win: Strømsgodset 1–6 Molde (17 October 1976)
- Highest scoring: Mjøndalen 5–3 Rosenborg (3 October 1976)
- Longest winning run: Brann (6 games)
- Longest unbeaten run: Brann (11 games)
- Longest winless run: Vard (16 games)
- Longest losing run: Fredrikstad; HamKam (5 games)
- Highest attendance: 22,401; Brann 0–2 Mjøndalen (17 October 1976)
- Lowest attendance: 1,289; Fredrikstad 1–0 Viking (10 October 1976)
- Average attendance: 6,488 ▼4.2%

The 1976 1. divisjon was the 32nd completed season of top division football in Norway.

== Overview ==
It was contested by 12 teams, and Lillestrøm SK won the championship, their second league title.

== Teams and locations ==
Note: Table lists in alphabetical order.

Team	Ap.	Location	Stadium
Brann	24	Bergen	Brann Stadion
Bryne	1	Bryne	Bryne Stadion
Fredrikstad	30	Fredrikstad	Fredrikstad Stadion
Hamarkameratene	7	Hamar	Briskeby
Lillestrøm	13	Lillestrøm	Åråsen Stadion
Mjøndalen	10	Mjøndalen	Nedre Eiker Stadion
Molde	5	Molde	Molde Stadion
Rosenborg	14	Trondheim	Lerkendal Stadion
Start	9	Kristiansand	Kristiansand Stadion
Strømsgodset	11	Drammen	Marienlyst Stadion
Vard	4	Haugesund	Haugesund Stadion
Viking	29	Stavanger	Stavanger Stadion

== League table ==
Pos	Team	Pld	W	D	L	GF	GA	GD	Pts	Qualification or relegation
1	Lillestrøm (C)	22	13	5	4	39	19	+20	31	Qualification for the European Cup first round
2	Mjøndalen	22	13	4	5	40	23	+17	30	Qualification for the UEFA Cup first round
3	Brann	22	11	6	5	38	29	+9	28	Qualification for the Cup Winners' Cup first round
4	Start	22	8	8	6	23	19	+4	24	Qualification for the UEFA Cup first round
5	Viking	22	6	10	6	24	21	+3	22	
6	Molde	22	9	3	10	34	29	+5	21	
7	Hamarkameratene	22	7	7	8	31	29	+2	21	
8	Rosenborg	22	7	7	8	24	29	−5	21	
9	Bryne	22	6	7	9	30	35	−5	19	
10	Strømsgodset (R)	22	6	7	9	31	43	−12	19	Relegation to Second Division
11	Fredrikstad (R)	22	5	5	12	27	50	−23	15	Relegation to Second Division
12	Vard (R)	22	2	9	11	21	36	−15	13	Relegation to Second Division

Source: NIFS
Rules for classification: 1) points; 2) goal difference; 3) number of goals scored.
(C) Champions; (R) Relegated

== Results ==
Home \ Away	BRA	BRY	FRE	HAM	LIL	MIF	MOL	ROS	IKS	STM	VAR	VIK
Brann	—	2–2	2–0	0–2	2–1	0–2	1–0	1–0	2–1	4–1	4–1	1–1
Bryne	1–1	—	0–2	4–0	3–2	0–2	1–0	0–1	1–1	5–0	1–1	1–1
Fredrikstad	2–2	2–5	—	1–1	0–3	1–4	2–1	1–1	3–0	0–1	3–3	1–0
Hamarkameratene	1–3	6–0	2–0	—	0–1	0–2	4–2	1–3	0–2	1–3	6–1	1–1
Lillestrøm	3–1	2–0	3–1	0–0	—	3–1	4–0	1–2	1–1	4–0	1–0	1–1
Mjøndalen	2–2	1–2	3–1	2–0	1–2	—	2–0	5–3	2–1	1–0	3–1	2–1
Molde	2–3	2–0	3–0	1–1	1–2	2–1	—	3–0	2–0	2–2	3–1	3–2
Rosenborg	3–1	3–1	1–1	1–1	0–1	0–0	1–0	—	0–0	1–1	2–1	1–1
Start	2–0	1–1	2–0	0–1	0–0	2–0	1–0	3–1	—	3–2	1–1	1–1
Strømsgodset	2–4	3–1	6–1	1–1	2–3	2–2	1–6	1–0	1–0	—	0–0	2–2
Vard	0–0	1–1	3–4	1–1	0–0	0–2	0–0	3–0	0–1	2–0	—	1–2
Viking	0–2	1–0	4–1	0–1	3–1	0–0	0–1	2–0	0–0	0–0	1–0	—

Source: nifs.no (in Norwegian)
Legend: Blue = home team win; Yellow = draw; Red = away team win.

== Season statistics ==
=== Top scorer ===
- (Norway) Jan Fuglset, Molde – 17 goals

=== Attendances ===
Pos	Team	Total	High	Low	Average	Change
1	Brann	155,458	22,401	7,914	14,133	+11.6%
2	Viking	96,122	12,070	4,614	8,738	−16.5%
3	Strømsgodset	74,807	11,744	4,500	6,801	−26.5%
4	Rosenborg	73,336	12,211	2,300	6,667	−30.6%
5	Start	72,181	10,041	4,087	6,562	−9.2%
6	Lillestrøm	69,808	10,696	3,300	6,346	+4.6%
7	Vard	68,574	8,842	2,609	6,234	n/a^{2}
8	Mjøndalen	55,904	8,900	2,500	5,082	+50.4%
9	Bryne	54,753	12,108	2,208	4,978	n/a^{2}
10	HamKam	53,631	11,500	2,000	4,876	n/a^{2}
11	Fredrikstad	42,418	6,274	1,289	3,856	−31.9%
12	Molde	39,436	4,768	1,950	3,585	−5.8%
	League total	856,428	22,401	1,289	6,488	−4.2%

Source: nifs.no
Notes:
2: Team played last season in 2. divisjon.
