= 1983 Molde FK season =

Molde
1983 season
- Chairman: Bernt Roald
- Head coach: Jan Fuglset
- Stadium: Molde Stadion
- 2. divisjon, group B: 1st (promoted)
- Norwegian Cup: Second Round vs. Kristiansund
- Top goalscorer: League: Jan Berg (17); All: Jan Berg (19)
- Highest home attendance: 3,950 vs. Strømsgodset (23 May 1983)
- Average home league attendance: 2,630

The 1983 season was Molde's 21st season in the second tier of Norwegian football and their first since their relegation from 1. divisjon in 1982. This season Molde competed in 2. divisjon group B and the Norwegian Cup.

In the league, Molde finished group B in 1st position, 5 points ahead of runners-up Strindheim.

Molde participated in the 1983 Norwegian Cup. They were knocked out by Kristiansund in the Second Round. The team lost 1–2 away at Kristiansund and were eliminated from the competition.

== Squad ==
Source: Note: Flags indicate national team as defined under FIFA eligibility rules; some limited exceptions apply. Players may hold more than one non-FIFA nationality.

No.	Pos.	Nation	Player
—	GK	(Norway) NOR	Inge Bratteteig
—	GK	(Norway) NOR	Stein Hagen
—	DF	(Norway) NOR	Knut Hallvard Eikrem
—	DF	(Norway) NOR	Tor Gunnar Hagbø
—	DF	(Norway) NOR	Ivar Helge Mittet
—	DF	(Norway) NOR	Ulrich Møller (Captain)
—	DF	(Norway) NOR	Bertil Stranden
—	MF	(Norway) NOR	Per Arne Aase
—	MF	(Norway) NOR	Stein Olav Hestad
—	MF	(Norway) NOR	Geir Malmedal

No.	Pos.	Nation	Player
—	MF	(Norway) NOR	Knut Nesbø
—	FW	(Norway) NOR	Jan Berg
—	FW	(Norway) NOR	Steinar Henden
—	FW	(Norway) NOR	Rune Ulvestad
—		(Norway) NOR	Geir Rune Dyrseth
—		(Norway) NOR	Roger Hagbø
—		(Norway) NOR	Stig Monsen
—		(Norway) NOR	Einar Sekkeseter
—		(Norway) NOR	Terje Sorthe

== Friendlies ==
19 February 1983	Molde	1–5	Kristiansund
CET (UTC+1)	Goal	Report	Goal

26 February 1983	Molde	2–2	Langevåg
CET (UTC+1)	Goal	Report	Goal

5 March 1983	Molde	6–0	Tynset
CET (UTC+1)	Goal	Report

12 March 1983	Molde	1–1	Tromsø
CET (UTC+1)	Goal	Report	Goal

19 March 1983	Molde	2–0	Hødd
CET (UTC+1)	Goal	Report

30 March 1983	Skarbøvik	0–2	Molde
CET (UTC+1)		Report	Goal

4 April 1983	Sunndal	1–0	Molde
CET (UTC+1)	Goal	Report

13 April 1983	Molde	3–1	Rosenborg
CET (UTC+1)	Goal	Report	Goal

15 April 1983	Ålgård	0–0	Molde
CET (UTC+1)		Report

17 April 1983	Bryne	0–2	Molde
CET (UTC+1)		Report	Goal

20 May 1983	Molde (Norway)	2–5	(England) Norwich City	Molde
CET (UTC+1)	Henden ?'; Berg 90'	Report	Unknown 44'; Unknown 47'; Unknown 65'	Stadium: Molde Stadion; Attendance: 3,100

10 July 1983	Pors	2–5	Molde	Porsgrunn
CET (UTC+1)	Unknown 31'; Unknown 46'	Report	Hestad 34' (pen.), 78' (pen.), 79'; Berg 43'; Henden 75'	Stadium: Kjølnes Stadion; Attendance: 1,000
Note: Tippekamp

17 July 1983	Molde	1–5	Fredrikstad	Molde
CET (UTC+1)	Henden 38'	Report	Unknown 3'; Unknown 25' (pen.); Unknown 34'; Unknown 84'; Unknown 90'	Stadium: Molde Stadion; Attendance: 1,500
Note: Tippekamp

23 July 1983	Steinkjer	1–3	Molde	Steinkjer
CET (UTC+1)	Unknown 58'	Report	Eikrem 53'; Ulvestad 84'; Berg 88'	Stadium: Guldbergaunet Stadion; Attendance: 500
Note: Tippekamp

== Competitions ==
=== 1. divisjon ===
==== Results summary ====
Overall								Home								Away							
Pld	W	D	L	GF	GA	GD	Pts	Pld	W	D	L	GF	GA	GD	Pts	Pld	W	D	L	GF	GA	GD	Pts
22	18	4	1	60	18	+42	38	11	9	2	0	31	7	+24	20	11	9	2	1	29	11	+18	18

==== Positions by round ====
Round	1	2	3	4	5	6	7	8	9	10	11	12	13	14	15	16	17	18	19	20	21	22
Ground	H	A	H	A	A	H	A	H	A	H	A	A	H	H	A	A	H	H	A	H	A	H
Result	W	W	W	D	D	D	W	W	W	W	W	L	W	D	W	W	W	W	W	W	W	W
Position	1	1	1	1	1	2	2	2	2	2	1	2	2	2	2	2	1	1	1	1	1	1

Source: see below

==== Results ====
24 April 1983 1	Molde	5–0	Bodø/Glimt	Molde
CET (UTC+1)	Malmedal 1' (pen.); Berg 43'; Hestad 50'; Mittet ?'; Eikrem 90'	Report		Stadium: Molde Stadion; Attendance: 3,000

1 May 1983 2	Aalesund	1–4	Molde	Ålesund
CET (UTC+1)	Unknown 13'	Report	Aase 4'; Henden 43'; Berg 50'; Hestad ?'	Stadium: Kråmyra Stadion; Attendance: 4,000

7 May 1983 3	Molde	3–1	Lyn	Molde
CET (UTC+1)	Malmedal (penalty missed); Berg 15'; Hestad 44'; Eikrem 78'	Report	Storskogen 50'	Stadium: Molde Stadion; Attendance: 3,200

12 May 1983 4	Strindheim	2–2	Molde	Trondheim
CET (UTC+1)	Unknown 29'; Unknown 32'	Report	Henden 13', 33'	Stadium: Lerkendal Stadion

14 May 1983 5	Steinkjer	1–1	Molde	Steinkjer
CET (UTC+1)	Unknown 51'	Report	Henden 50'	Stadium: Guldbergaunet Stadion

23 May 1983 6	Molde	0–0	Strømsgodset	Molde
CET (UTC+1)		Report		Stadium: Molde Stadion; Attendance: 3,950

28 May 1983 7	Mjølner	0–1	Molde	Narvik
CET (UTC+1)		Report	Eikrem 13'	Stadium: Narvik Stadion

5 June 1983 8	Molde	5–1	Hødd	Molde
CET (UTC+1)	Ulvestad 5', 76'; Berg 11'; Aase 52'; Hestad 74'	Report	Unknown 6'	Stadium: Molde Stadion; Attendance: 2,850

11 June 1983 9	Tromsø	0–1	Molde	Tromsø
CET (UTC+1)		Report	Nesbø 71'	Stadium: Alfheim Stadion

19 June 1983 10	Molde	2–1	Stjørdals-Blink	Molde
CET (UTC+1)	Eikrem 40'; Berg 76'	Report	Unknown 27'	Stadium: Molde Stadion; Attendance: 1,800

25 June 1983 11	Mo	1–2	Molde	Mo i Rana
CET (UTC+1)	Unknown ?'	Report	Eikrem ?', ?'	Stadium: Sagbakken Stadion; Attendance: 1,000

31 July 1983 12	Bodø/Glimt	2–1	Molde	Bodø
CET (UTC+1)	Unknown 69'; Unknown 72'	Report	Hestad 43' (pen.)	Stadium: Aspmyra Stadion; Attendance: 799

7 August 1983 13	Molde	5–1	Aalesund	Molde
CET (UTC+1)	Henden 30', 75', 87'; Berg 43', 66'	Report	Unknown 55'	Stadium: Molde Stadion; Attendance: 2,100

14 August 1983 14	Molde	1–1	Strindheim	Molde
CET (UTC+1)	Berg 10'	Report	Vatten ?'	Stadium: Molde Stadion

21 August 1983 15	Lyn	1–4	Molde	Oslo
CET (UTC+1)	Eibakk 85'	Report	Berg 38', 59', 80'; Sorthe 78'	Stadium: Ullevaal Stadion; Attendance: 529

28 August 1983 16	Strømsgodset	2–3	Molde	Drammen
CET (UTC+1)	Unknown 52'; Unknown 62' (pen.)	Report	Berg ?', 45'; Hestad 71'	Stadium: Marienlyst Stadion

4 September 1983 17	Molde	2–0	Steinkjer	Molde
CET (UTC+1)	Henden 35', 87'	Report		Stadium: Molde Stadion; Attendance: 2,970

11 September 1983 18	Molde	2–0	Mjølner	Molde
CET (UTC+1)	Stranden ?'; Ulvestad 75'	Report		Stadium: Molde Stadion; Attendance: 2,300

18 September 1983 19	Hødd	1–4	Molde	Ulsteinvik
CET (UTC+1)	Unknown 60'	Report	Møller 19'; Ulvestad 38'; Hestad 48' (pen.); Berg 54'	Stadium: Høddvoll Stadion

25 September 1983 20	Molde	4–1	Tromsø	Molde
CET (UTC+1)	Nesbø 3'; Stranden 18'; Berg 39'; Hestad 55' (pen.)	Report	Unknown 82'	Stadium: Molde Stadion; Attendance: 1,700

2 October 1983 21	Stjørdals-Blink	0–6	Molde	Stjørdalshalsen
CET (UTC+1)		Report	Møller 1'; Mittet 9'; Eikrem 45', ?'; Berg 47'; Aase ?'	Stadium: Øverlands Minde; Attendance: 850

9 October 1983 22	Molde	2–1	Mo	Molde
CET (UTC+1)	Henden 65'; Berg 77'	Report	Unknown 13'	Stadium: Molde Stadion; Attendance: 2,430

==== League table ====
Pos	Team	Pld	W	D	L	GF	GA	GD	Pts	Promotion, qualification or relegation
1	Molde (C, P)	22	17	4	1	60	18	+42	38	Promotion to 1. divisjon
2	Strindheim (O, P)	22	13	7	2	35	21	+14	33	Qualification for promotion play-offs
3	Steinkjer	22	11	6	5	50	24	+26	28	
4	Strømsgodset	22	9	9	4	35	23	+12	27	
5	Lyn	22	9	6	7	28	29	−1	24	
6	Tromsø	22	5	11	6	19	24	−5	21	
7	Mjølner	22	8	5	9	24	30	−6	21	
8	Hødd	22	8	2	12	32	46	−14	18	
9	Mo	22	6	5	11	22	24	−2	17	
10	Stjørdals-Blink (R)	22	6	5	11	24	39	−15	17	Relegation to 3. divisjon
11	Aalesund (R)	22	4	3	15	23	46	−23	11	Relegation to 3. divisjon
12	Bodø/Glimt (R)	22	2	5	15	13	41	−28	9	Relegation to 3. divisjon

Source: rsssf.no
Rules for classification: 1) points; 2) goal difference; 3) number of goals scored.
(C) Champions; (O) Play-off winners; (P) Promoted; (R) Relegated

=== Norwegian Cup ===
25 May 1983 First round	Molde	3 – 0	Clausenengen	Molde
CEST (UTC+2)	Berg 9', 24'; Eikrem 88'	Report		Stadium: Molde Stadion

8 June 1983 Second round	Kristiansund	2 – 1	Molde	Kristiansund
CEST (UTC+2)	Unknown; Unknown	Report	Unknown 55'

== Squad statistics ==
=== Appearances and goals ===
Lacking information:

- Appearance statistics from Norwegian Cup rounds 1–2 (4–6 players in round 1 and 11–13 players in round 2) and the goalscorer in round 2 are missing.

No.	Pos	Nat	Player	Total		2. divisjon		Norwegian Cup	
No.	Pos	Nat	Player	Apps	Goals	Apps	Goals	Apps	Goals
	MF	(Norway) NOR	Per Arne Aase	22	3	21	3	1	0
	FW	(Norway) NOR	Jan Berg	23	19	22	17	1	2
	GK	(Norway) NOR	Inge Bratteteig	18	0	18	0	0	0
	DF	(Norway) NOR	Knut Hallvard Eikrem	15	9	13+1	8	1	1
	DF	(Norway) NOR	Tor Gunnar Hagbø	23	0	22	0	1	0
	GK	(Norway) NOR	Stein Hagen	4	0	4	0	0	0
	FW	(Norway) NOR	Steinar Henden	19	10	16+2	10	1	0
	MF	(Norway) NOR	Stein Olav Hestad	23	8	21+1	8	1	0
	MF	(Norway) NOR	Geir Malmedal	12	1	9+3	1	0	0
	DF	(Norway) NOR	Ivar Helge Mittet	19	2	18+1	2	0	0
		(Norway) NOR	Stig Monsen	6	0	1+5	0	0	0
	DF	(Norway) NOR	Ulrich Møller	22	2	22	2	0	0
	MF	(Norway) NOR	Knut Nesbø	11	2	8+2	2	1	0
		(Norway) NOR	Einar Sekkeseter	12	0	9+3	0	0	0
		(Norway) NOR	Terje Sorthe	7	1	3+4	1	0	0
	DF	(Norway) NOR	Bertil Stranden	19	2	18+1	2	0	0
	FW	(Norway) NOR	Rune Ulvestad	20	4	17+3	4	0	0

=== Goalscorers ===
Rank	Position	Nat.	Player	2. divisjon	Norwegian Cup	Total
1	FW	(Norway)	Jan Berg	17	2	19
2	FW	(Norway)	Steinar Henden	10	0	10
3	DF	(Norway)	Knut Hallvard Eikrem	8	1	9
4	MF	(Norway)	Stein Olav Hestad	8	0	8
5	FW	(Norway)	Rune Ulvestad	4	0	4
6	MF	(Norway)	Per Arne Aase	3	0	3
7	DF	(Norway)	Ivar Helge Mittet	2	0	2
7	DF	(Norway)	Ulrich Møller	2	0	2
7	MF	(Norway)	Knut Nesbø	2	0	2
7	DF	(Norway)	Bertil Stranden	2	0	2
11	MF	(Norway)	Geir Malmedal	1	0	1
11		(Norway)	Terje Sorthe	1	0	1
			Unknown	0	1	1
			TOTALS	60	4	64

== See also ==
- Molde FK seasons
