= Jan Fuglset =

Norwegian footballer (born 1945)

Personal information
- Full name: Jan Fuglset
- Date of birth: 1 October 1945 (age 81)
- Place of birth: Molde, Norway
- Position: Striker

Senior career*
Years	Team	Apps	(Gls)
1963–1967	Molde	79	(48)
1967–1972	Fredrikstad	93	(52)
1973–1982	Molde	116	(57)
Total		288	(157)

International career
1970–1974	Norway	20	(6)

Managerial career
- 1982–1984: Molde
- 1992–1993: Molde
- * Club domestic league appearances and goals

Jan Fuglset (born 1 October 1945) is a Norwegian former professional football player. Fuglset is known as one of the leading goal-scorers in the Norwegian top division with 109 goals from 1967–1982. He is the brother of Tor Fuglset.

== Club career ==
Fuglset started his career in his hometown club Molde FK. From 1967 to 1972 he played for Fredrikstad FK, while he took a teacher-education in Halden. In 1971 he became top goal scorer in the First Division with 17 goals. In 93 first tier matches for Fredrikstad, he scored 52 goals.

In 1973, he was back in Molde, and played for Molde FK until he retired from football in 1982. In the final game of the 1976 league season, he scored all goals in a 6–0 drubbing of Strømsgodset IF, which saved his club from relegation, and relegated the opposition instead. Six goals in one game is still, as of 2019, a joint record for the Norwegian top division that Fuglset share with Odd Iversen. The six goals made him top goal scorer in 1976 with 17 goals. He became top scorer in the top division for Fredrikstad in 1971 and for Molde in 1976 and is, alongside Thorstein Helstad, Odd Iversen, Frode Johnsen one of only four players who have become top scorer in the Norwegian top flight with two different clubs.

== Career statistics ==
Appearances and goals by club, season and competition
Club	Season	League			Norwegian Cup		Continental		Other		Total	
Club	Season	Division	Apps	Goals	Apps	Goals	Apps	Goals	Apps	Goals	Apps	Goals
Molde	1963	Norwegian Third Division	9	4		0	–				9	4
Molde	1964	Norwegian Third Division	12	4	4	1	–				16	5
Molde	1965	Norwegian Third Division	14	17	2	1	–				16	18
Molde	1966	Norwegian Third Division	14	17	3	4	–				17	21
Molde	1967	Norwegian Third Division	11	7	3	4	–				14	11
Molde	Total		60	49	12	10	–	–	–	–	72	59
Fredrikstad	1968	Norwegian First Division	?	10	?	?	?	?	?	?	?	?
Fredrikstad	1969	Norwegian First Division	?	7	?	?	?	?	?	?	?	?
Fredrikstad	1970	Norwegian First Division	?	6	?	?	?	?	?	?	?	?
Fredrikstad	1971	Norwegian First Division	18	17	?	?	?	?	?	?	?	?
Fredrikstad	1972	Norwegian First Division	?	12	?	?	?	?	?	?	?	?
Fredrikstad	Total			52								
Molde	1973	Norwegian Second Division	18	18	4	1	–				22	19
Molde	1974	Norwegian First Division	20	11	5	6	–				25	17
Molde	1975	Norwegian First Division	19	8	1	0	1	0	–		21	8
Molde	1976	Norwegian First Division	20	17	3	2	–				23	19
Molde	1977	Norwegian First Division	21	8	1	1	–				22	9
Molde	1978	Norwegian First Division	10	5	1	0	2	1	–		13	6
Molde	1979	Norwegian Second Division	19	6	4	4	–		2	1	25	12
Molde	1980	Norwegian First Division	22	6	4	3	–				26	9
Molde	1981	Norwegian Second Division	16	3	4	3	–		2	0	22	6
Molde	1982	Norwegian First Division	2	1	1	0	–				3	1
Molde	1983	Norwegian Second Division	0	0	1	0	–				1	0
Molde	Total		167	83	29	20	3	1	4	1	203	105

== International career ==
Jan Fuglset was capped 20 times for Norway and scored six international goals. He made his debut against Finland on 17 June 1970. His first two international goals came in his third match in an international friendly against Iceland on 26 May 1971, a game Norway won 3-1. His last international appearance was against Yugoslavia on 30 October 1974.

=== International goals ===
Scores and results list Norway's goal tally first.

International goals by date, venue, cap, opponent, score, result and competition
No.	Date	Venue	Cap	Opponent	Score	Result	Competition
1	26 May 1971	Brann Stadion, Bergen, Norway	3	Iceland	2–1	3–1	Friendly
2	26 May 1971	Brann Stadion, Bergen, Norway	3	Iceland	3–1	3–1	Friendly
3	25 August 1971	Helsinki Olympic Stadium, Helsinki, Finland	8	Finland	1–0	1–1	Nordic Championship
4	26 September 1971	Ullevaal Stadion, Oslo, Norway	10	Denmark	1–3	1–4	Nordic Championship
5	3 August 1972	Stavanger Stadion, Stavanger, Norway	14	Iceland	1–0	4–1	1974 FIFA World Cup qualification
6	17 September 1972	Ullevaal Stadion, Oslo, Norway	15	Sweden	1–1	1–3	Nordic Championship

== Coaching career ==
Fuglset served as a player-coach in 1976, and was the head coach of Molde in two periods.

== Honours ==
=== As player ===
Fredrikstad

- Norwegian Cup: Runner-up 1969, Runner-up 1971

Individual

- Norwegian top division top scorer: 1971, 1976

=== As coach ===
Molde

- Norwegian Cup: Runner-up 1982
