= Steinar Nilssen =

Norwegian footballer (born 1954)

Personal information
- Date of birth: 9 December 1954 (age 71)

International career
Years	Team	Apps	(Gls)
1979	Norway	1	(0)

Steinar Nilssen (born 9 December 1954) is a Norwegian footballer. He played in one match for the Norway national football team in 1979.
