= Viggo Sundmoen =

Norwegian footballer and manager (born 1954)

Personal information
- Date of birth: 24 April 1954 (age 72)
- Place of birth: Os Municipality, Hedmark, Norway
- Position: Forward

Senior career*
Years	Team	Apps	(Gls)
1978–81	Rosenborg	69	(27)
1982–85	HamKam	80	
- * Club domestic league appearances and goals

Viggo Sundmoen (born 24 April 1954) is a Norwegian former footballer from Os Municipality in Hedmark, who played for Rosenborg (1978–81) and HamKam (1982–85). He became Rosenborg's top scorer in the 1979 season with seven and 1980 season with eleven goals. Sundmoen was known for his great speed and was thus given the nickname the Os Express.
