= Jan Berg (footballer, born 1965) =

Norwegian footballer

Personal information
- Date of birth: 14 May 1965 (age 61)
- Place of birth: Molde, Norway
- Position: Midfielder

Senior career*
Years	Team	Apps	(Gls)
1981–1988	Molde	151	(44)
1988–1989	Elche	13	(1)
1989–1991	Rayo Vallecano	47	(4)
1991–1995	Molde	27	(3)
Total		216	(50)

International career
1982–1990	Norway	15	(0)
1983–1986	Norway Olympic	8	(0)
- * Club domestic league appearances and goals

Jan Berg (born 14 May 1965) is a Norwegian former professional footballer, who played at both professional and international levels as a midfielder.

== Career ==
Berg played club football in Norway and Spain for Molde, Elche and Rayo.

Berg earned 23 caps for Norway between 1982 and 1990 at all senior levels – 15 at full international level, 7 in Olympic Qualifiers, and one at the 1984 Summer Olympics.

== Personal life ==
His brother is Odd Berg. He is also the brother-in-law of Stein Olav Hestad and maternal uncle of Daniel Berg Hestad
