= Huib Ruijgrok =

Dutch former football coach

Personal information
- Date of birth: 26 April 1944 (age 82)
- Place of birth: The Hague

Managerial career
- Years: Team
- 1977–1979: Molde FK
- 1980: Fredrikstad FK
- 1980–1983: De Graafschap
- 1983–1984: SVV
- 1984–1987: HBS Craeyenhout
- 1996–1997: HBS Craeyenhout

Huib Ruijgrok (born 26 April 1944) is a Dutch former football coach.

He coached Molde FK, Fredrikstad FK, De Graafschap, Schiedamse Voetbal Vereniging, and HBS Craeyenhout.
