= Odd Ivar Moen =

Norwegian football player (born 1955)

Personal information
- Date of birth: 6 March 1955 (age 71)
- Position: Defender

Team information
- Current team: Molde FK (chairman)

Senior career*
Years	Team	Apps	(Gls)
–1973	Fræna		
1974–1980	Molde		
1984	Fram Larvik		
1985–1987	Molde	38	(4)

International career
1972–1973	Norway U19	5	(0)
- * Club domestic league appearances and goals

Odd Ivar Moen (born 6 March 1955) is a Norwegian businessman and former football player. He is currently the chairman of Eliteserien club Molde.

== Playing career ==
=== Early career ===
He started his senior career at Fræna FK and left to play for Molde in 1974.

=== Molde ===
Moen played a total of ten seasons at Molde. He made his debut for the club on 27 July 1975 in Moldes 0–2 loss to Mjøndalen at Molde Stadion. He appeared as a 72nd minute substitute for Stein Olav Hestad in the second leg of the 1975–76 UEFA Cup first round against Öster. On 30 May 1987, he made his final appearance for Molde in the club's Norwegian Cup win against Kristiansund in the first round of the competition. Moen played a total of 103 top division games for Molde scoring 15 goals.

=== International career ===
Odd Ivar Moen played a total of five games for Norway under-19 between 1972 and 1973. On 8 August 1972, he debuted against Denmark when he came in as a substitute in a 1–1 draw. He played his last match at international level on 4 June 1973, in a game Norway lost 1–2 to Netherlands under-19.

== After playing career ==
Moen became a member of the board at Molde FK in 2001. He was vice-chairman from 2012 until 1 December 2015, when he became acting chairman after Øystein Neerland left the position to become director at the club. In February 2016, he was elected chairman at Molde.
