= Old Fredrikstad Stadion =

Football stadium in Fredrikstad, Norway

Coordinates: 59°13′10″N 10°55′42″E

Fredrikstad stadion
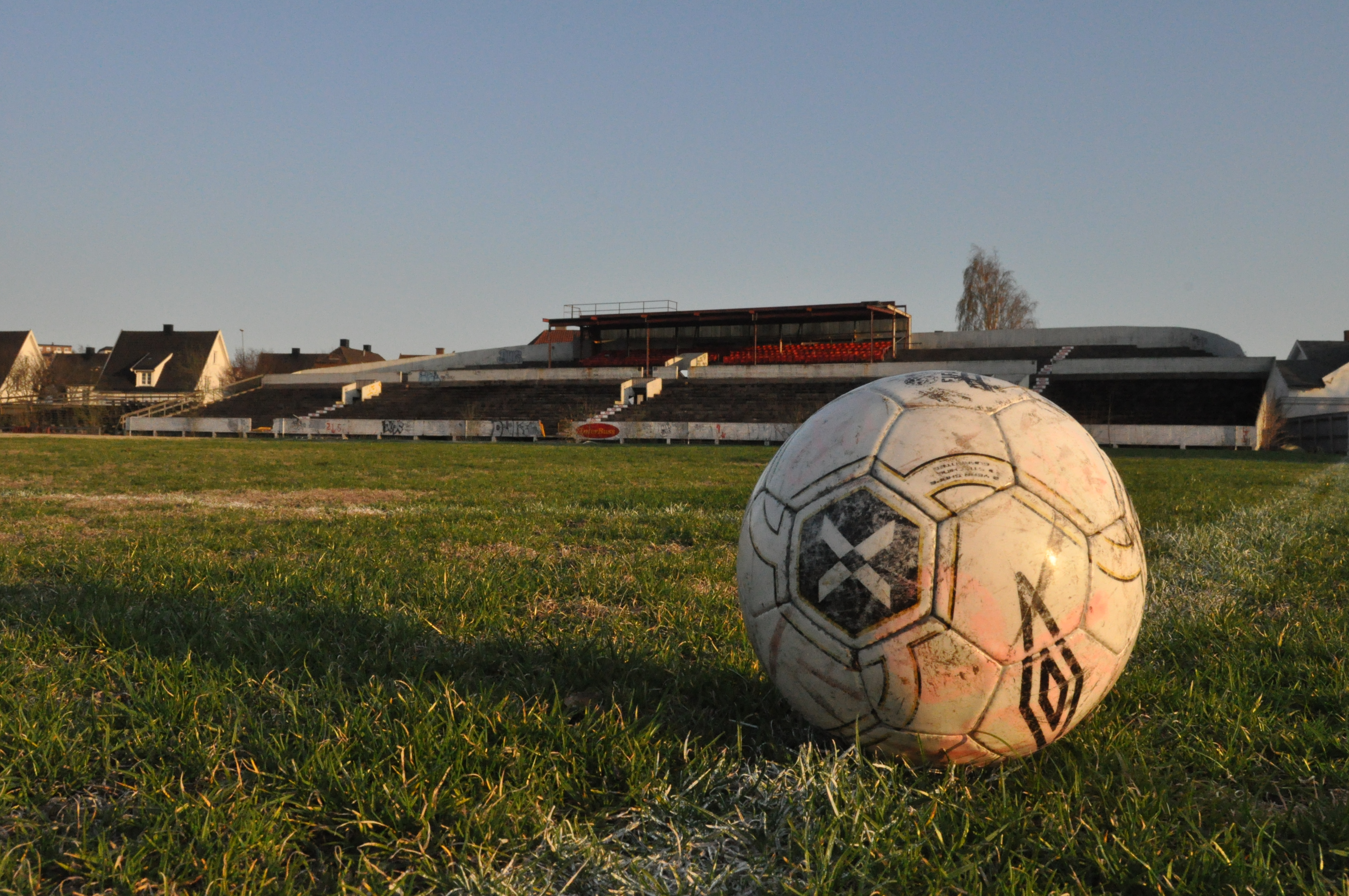
- Interactive map of Fredrikstad stadion
- Capacity: 10,500

Construction
- Opened: 1914
- Closed: 2007
- Demolished: 2011

Tenant
- Fredrikstad FK (1914–2007)

Fredrikstad Stadion was the homeground of the Norwegian top division football club Fredrikstad FK until the end of the 2006 season, due to their new and modernized stadium at the borough of Kråkerøy, only a few minutes away from the city center. The stadium opened in 1914 named Fredrikstad Idræts- og Fotbaldplads.

The venue has hosted the Norwegian Athletics Championships in 1915 and 1921. The venue has hosted Norway national under-21 football team matches times, playing 1–0 against Iceland on 30 May 1978, 2–3 against Wales on 20 September 1983 and 1–0 against Netherlands on 22 September 1992. The total capacity of the stadium was approximately 10,500. The spectator's record is approximately 15,000.

The old stadium had a long history since it was built in the 1920s. It hosted the Norwegian Cup final in 1925, a game Brann won 3–0 against Sarpsborg. But it was nonetheless highly worn out and out of date at the end. The stadium no longer exists, it was condemned to make place for flats and offices in the winter 2011/2012.
