= Harry Hestad =

Norwegian footballer and coach (born 1944)

- Hestad playing for FC Den Haag in 1972

Personal information
- Full name: Harry Asbjørn Hestad
- Date of birth: 7 November 1944 (age 81)
- Place of birth: Molde, Norway
- Position: Winger

Senior career*
Years	Team	Apps	(Gls)
1961–1970	Molde	207	(29)
1970–1972	FC Den Haag	55	(7)
1972–1979	Molde	150	(16)
Total		412	(52)

International career
1969–1976	Norway	31	(5)

Managerial career
- 1969: Molde (player-coach)
- 1986–1989: Molde
- 1995: Træff
- * Club domestic league appearances and goals

Harry Asbjørn Hestad (born 7 November 1944) is a Norwegian former football player and coach. Just as his brother Stein Olav Hestad, Hestad played for Molde almost his entire career, only interrupted by two seasons in the Dutch club FC Den Haag. He was also an active player for the Norwegian national team from 1969 through 1976, scoring five goals in 31 matches.

== Club career ==
=== Molde FK ===
Hestad was born in Molde, and played 503 games for the local team Molde FK. He made his debut in 1961, and in 1969 he became player-manager together with Torkild Brakstad.

=== FC Den Haag ===
Hestad played for FC Den Haag together with Harald Berg for two seasons. His team played the final of the 1971–72 KNVB Cup, where Den Haag lost 2–3 against Ajax. In the Eredivisie, Den Haag achieved a 3rd and 4th place during his time at the club.

=== Second spell at Molde ===
Hestad returned to Molde in 1972 after two season in Netherlands, and spent the second half of the 1972 season as player-coach alongside Torkild Brakstad. On 25 June 1972, he played his first game after his return, a second tier game Molde lost 2–4 away against Steinkjer. Hestad was a part of the Molde team who won silver medal in the 1974 1. divisjon, the club's first medal in the top division. He played for Molde for the rest of his career until he retired in 1979.

== International career ==
Harry Hestad was capped 31 times for Norway, scoring five goals. He made his debut against Mexico on 8 May 1969.

His first two international goals came against Guatemala, in a Friendly match on 13 November 1969, a game Norway won 3–1.

His last international appearance was against Denmark on 24 June 1976.

=== International goals ===
Scores and results list Norway's goal tally first.

#	Date	Venue	Opponent	Result	Competition	Scored
1-2	13 November 1969	Guatemala City	Guatemala	3–1	Friendly match	2
3	3 August 1972	Stavanger	Iceland	4–1	1974 FIFA World Cup qualification	1
4	12 September 1973	Oslo	Netherlands	1–2	1974 FIFA World Cup qualification	1
5	8 August 1974	Gothenburg	Sweden	1–2	Friendly match	1

== Managerial career ==
From 1986 to 1989, he was head coach at Molde alongside Åge Hareide. Under their leadership, Molde finished 2nd in the league in 1987, 3rd in 1988 and lost the 1989 Cup Final. He was also the head coach of Træff in 1995, and later on Malmefjorden and Fræna.

== Personal life ==
He is the brother of Stein Olav Hestad, with whom he was a teammate for several seasons at Molde, and the uncle of former footballer Daniel Berg Hestad.
