= Kristiansand Stadion =

Stadion in Norway

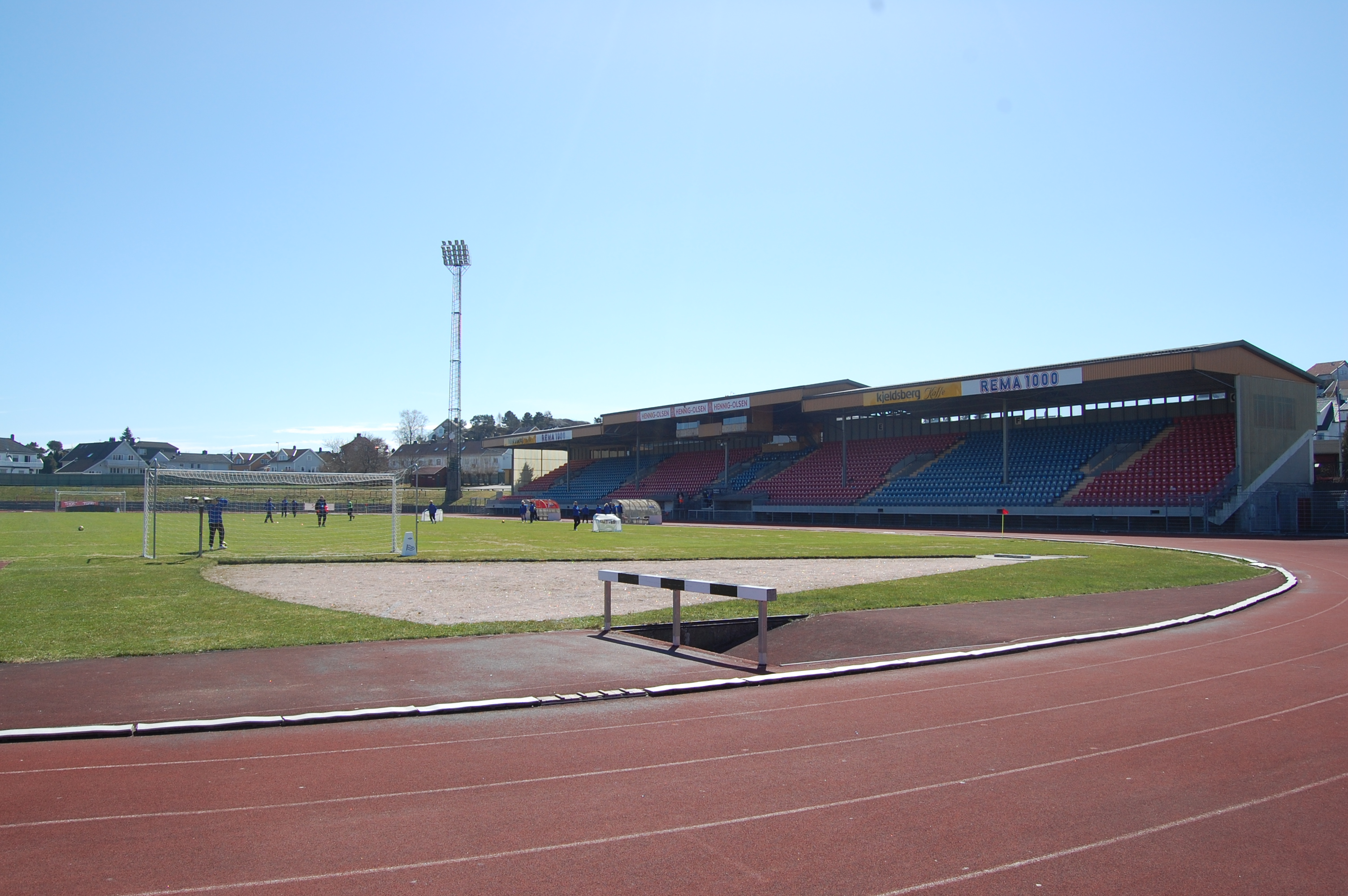
- Kristiansand Stadion, seen from the north
- Interactive map of Kristiansand Stadion
- Location: Østre Ringvei 2, 4632 Kristiansand
- Coordinates: 58°8′51″N 8°1′17″E
- Owner: Kristiansand kommune
- Operator: Kristiansand kommune
- Capacity: 16,600
- Surface: Grass

Construction
- Opened: 11 July 1948

Tenants
- FK Donn (football); Kristiansands IF (athletics)

Kristiansand stadion is a multi-use stadium in Kristiansand, Norway. The stadium holds 16,600 people. It was mostly used for football matches and was the home ground of I.K. Start. In 2007, Sør Arena replaced Kristiansand stadion as home ground for IK Start.

== Football ==
The venue hosted Norway national under-21 football team matches twice, the first home game ever, losing 1–2 against Sweden on 31 May 1969 and winning 3–1 over Hungary on 9 October 1990.

== Athletics ==
The stadium is also used for athletics, the home team being Kristiansands IF. The venue hosted the Norwegian Athletics Championships in 1970, 1996 and 2012.

In 2019, the stadium hosted the under-20 Nordic championships in athletics.

== Other sport ==
In 1964, the stadium held motorcycle speedway, when the semi-final of the Norwegian Individual Speedway Championship was held there.
