= Stavanger Stadion =

Football stadium in Stavanger, Norway

- Interactive map of Stavanger Stadion
- Location: Stavanger, Norway
- Coordinates: 58.9652°N 5.7114°E
- Capacity: 5,000
- Record attendance: 18,892 (Viking–Odd, 4 October 1959)

Construction
- Opened: 13 August 1917

Tenant
- Viking FK 1917 - 2004

Stavanger Stadion is a multi-use stadium in Stavanger, Norway. It was used mostly for football matches and hosted the home matches of Viking FK. The stadium opened on 13 August 1917, and was able to hold 17,555 people at the end of its life as Viking's home ground in 2004. The west stand was the largest single-tier spectator stand in the country. The other stands were small roofless terraces without seating.

== History ==
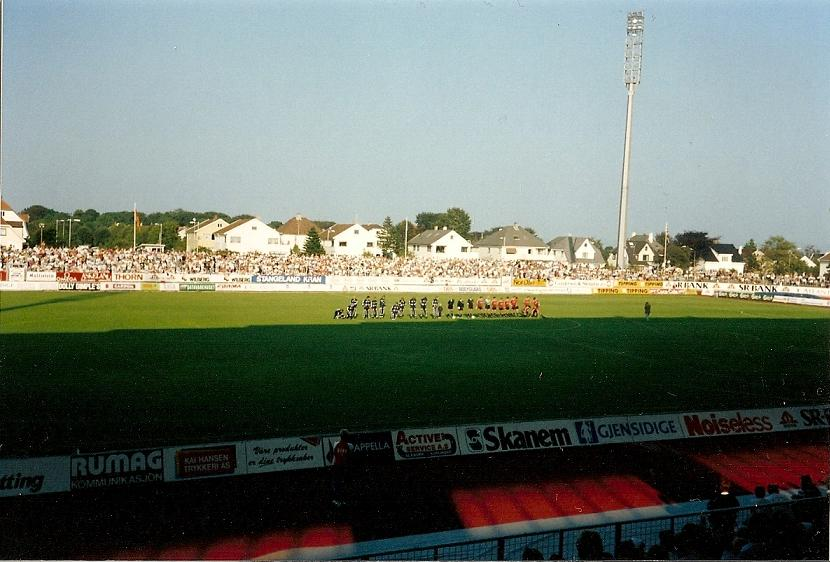
Stavanger Stadion in 1991, seen from the west stand

Stavanger Stadion was closed in 2004 when Viking Stadion opened, but was reopened a few years later as a track and field stadium after a major reconstruction of the spectator stands. Some of the seats from the old main stand were donated to Sandnes Idrettspark.

Unlike Viking Stadion, which was built outside the city centre, Stavanger Stadion is located within walking distance from downtown Stavanger.

The attendance record of 18,892 spectators dates from 4 October 1959, when Viking met Odd in the semi-final of the Norwegian Cup.

The venue has hosted the Norwegian Athletics Championships in 1923, 1956 and 1972.

Between 1966 and 1990 Stavanger Stadion hosted nine Norway international matches, including a 2-1 win against England in 1971 and four 1-1 draws with Finland in 1966, 1975, 1979 and 1982 respectively. The remaining four matches included a 3-0 win against Bermuda in 1969, a 4-1 win against Iceland in 1972, a 1-1 draw against East Germany in 1983, and a 2-1 defeat to Sweden in 1990. The Sweden game was the last international Norway played at the stadium and was also the only one of the nine matches they played there that ended with a defeat.

The venue also hosted the Norway national under-21 football team on seven occasions, playing 0–0 against the Netherlands 5 June 1974, 6–0 against Italy on 5 June 1991, 1–1 against England on 1 June 1993, 3–1 against Poland on 21 September 1993, 3–4 against the Czech Republic on 15 August 1995, 2–2 against England on 10 October 1995 and 1–2 against Poland on 24 March 2001.
