= Stein Olav Hestad =

Norwegian footballer (born 1952)

Personal information
- Date of birth: 30 June 1952 (age 74)
- Place of birth: Molde, Norway
- Position: Midfielder

Senior career*
Years	Team	Apps	(Gls)
1971–1989	Molde		

International career
1974–1975	Norway U21	7	(0)
- * Club domestic league appearances and goals

Stein Olav "Laffen" Hestad (born 30 June 1952) is a Norwegian former footballer. Hestad spent his entire playing career at Molde FK, where he previously had club record with 681 first-team matches, including 249 matches in the Norwegian top division. Unlike his brother, Harry, "Laffen" was never capped for Norway.

== Club career ==
Hestad got his debut in a competitive match on 1 May 1971 in a second tier league game Molde lost 0–1 at home to Aalesund. He played a total of 249 top division matches for Molde and scored 27 goals. He won the silver medal in the Norwegian league in 1974 and 1987. He was also in Molde's losing Norwegian Cup finalist teams in both the 1982 Norwegian Football Cup and 1989 Norwegian Football Cup.

== International career ==
Hestad played seven matches for the Norway national under-21 football team.

== Personal life ==
He is the brother of Harry Hestad, with whom he was a teammate for several seasons at Molde.

He is the father of the footballers Daniel Berg Hestad, who surpassed him in number of first-team matches for Molde FK, and Peter Berg Hestad, as well as brother-in-law with the footballers Odd Berg and Jan Berg.
