= Molde Idrettspark =

Sports venue in Molde, Norway

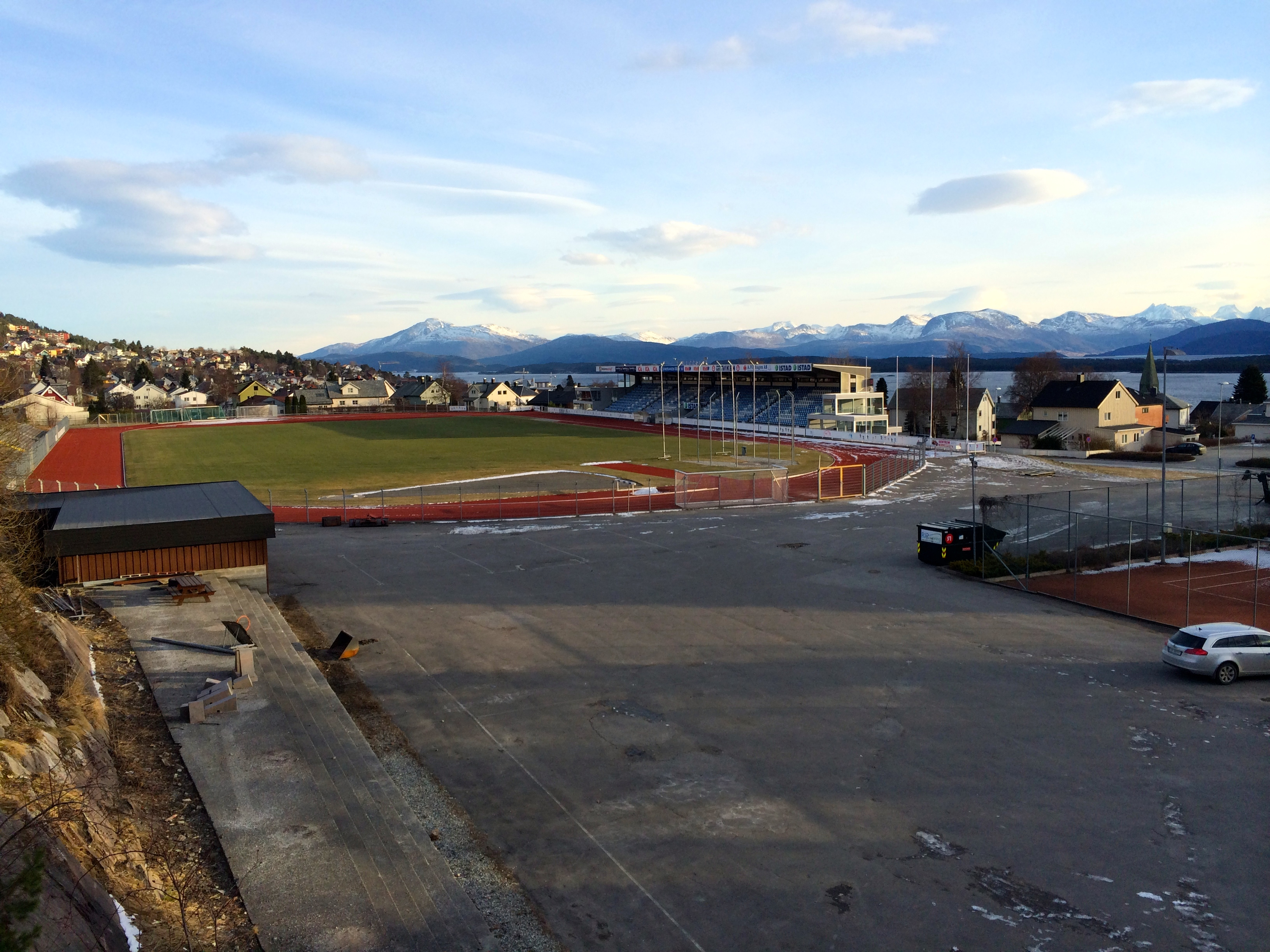
- Interactive map of Molde Idrettspark
- Former names: Molde stadion (–1998)
- Location: Molde, Norway
- Coordinates: 62°44′26″N 7°09′19″E
- Owner: Molde Municipality
- Capacity: 1,400 (seats)
- Surface: Grass; All-weather running track
- Record attendance: 14,793

Construction
- Opened: 28 August 1955

Tenants
- SK Træff (football); IL Molde-Olymp (athletics); Molde FK (football, 1955–1998)

Molde Idrettspark, until 1998 known as Molde Stadion, is a multi-purpose stadium located in Molde, Norway. It serves as the home ground for the athletics team IL Molde-Olymp and the football clubs SK Træff and reserve and development teams of Molde FK. Prior to the 1998 opening of Aker Stadion it also served as the home ground for Molde FK's Eliteserien team. The stadium opened on 28 August 1955 and had an approximate capacity for 15,000 spectators. The current seated capacity is 1,400.

== History ==
Until 1955, Molde FK had been playing their games at Rivalbanen. Molde Stadion opened on 28 August 1955 with a second tier league match between Molde FK and Kristiansund FK. Arne Hemnes scored the first goal, the only goal of the game, thus the home team won 1–0. Approximately 2,500 spectators attended the opening game. Molde played in the top division, the Main League in 1958, after which the stadium was not used for top-level football again until Molde was promoted to the 1974 1. divisjon. That year saw an expansion of the terraces. The seated stand was built by the club in the mid-1980s. However, the costs were too much for the club to bear and was a contributing factor to the club's near bankruptcy in 1991.

The record attendance of 14,793 dates from 10 October 1987, the 1987 league title decisive match against Moss FK which Molde lost 0–2. Molde's first team moved to the new Molde Stadion (now Aker Stadion) in 1998. Molde FK played a total of 227 top division matches at Molde Idrettspark.
