= 1993 Molde FK season =

Molde
1993 season
- Chairman: Sondre Kåfjord
- Head coaches: Jan Fuglset; Ulrich Møller
- Stadium: Molde Stadion
- Tippeligaen: 10th (relegated)
- Norwegian Cup: Quarter-final vs. Brann
- Top goalscorer: League: Roar Strand (10); All: Roar Strand (13)
- Highest home attendance: 7,029 vs Rosenborg (20 June 1993)
- Average home league attendance: 3,520

The 1993 season was Molde's 19th season in the top flight of Norwegian football. This season Molde competed in Tippeligaen and the Norwegian Cup.

In Tippeligaen, Molde finished in 10th position and had to play relegation play-offs against second tier teams Strømsgodset and Bryne. Molde finished the play-offs in second place and were relegated to 1. divisjon after having lost 0–2 at home against Strømsgodset and drew 2–2 away against Bryne.

Molde participated in the 1993 Norwegian Cup. They reached the quarter-finals where they were knocked out after losing 0–2 away to Brann.

== Squad ==
Source: Note: Flags indicate national team as defined under FIFA eligibility rules; some limited exceptions apply. Players may hold more than one non-FIFA nationality.

No.	Pos.	Nation	Player
—	GK	(Norway) NOR	Morten Bakke
—	GK	(Norway) NOR	Are Lervik
—	DF	(Scotland) SCO	Arthur Albiston
—	DF	(Spain) ESP	Flaco
—	DF	(Norway) NOR	Sindre Eid
—	DF	(Norway) NOR	Erik Hoftun
—	DF	(Norway) NOR	Ulrich Møller (Captain)
—	DF	(Norway) NOR	Sindre Rekdal
—	DF	(Norway) NOR	Trond Strande
—	DF	(Norway) NOR	Roger Svendsen
—	MF	(Norway) NOR	Jan Berg
—	MF	(Norway) NOR	Stig Hasselvold
—	MF	(Norway) NOR	Daniel Berg Hestad

No.	Pos.	Nation	Player
—	MF	(Norway) NOR	Tarje Nordstrand Jacobsen
—	MF	(Norway) NOR	Morten Kristiansen
—	MF	(Norway) NOR	André Nevstad
—	MF	(Norway) NOR	Petter Rudi
—	MF	(Norway) NOR	Roar Strand
—	MF	(Norway) NOR	Berdon Sønderland
—	FW	(Norway) NOR	Kjell Gunnar Ildhusøy
—	FW	(England) ENG	Steve Kinsey
—	FW	(Norway) NOR	Hans Ivar Klefstad
—	FW	(Norway) NOR	Øystein Neerland
—	FW	(Norway) NOR	Ole Bjørn Sundgot
—		(Norway) NOR	Mads Kringstad

== Friendlies ==
23 January 1993	Bodø/Glimt	1 – 1	Molde	Bodø
CET (UTC+1)	Goal	Report	Goal	Stadium: Nordlandshallen
Note: Molde won on penalties

24 January 1993	Molde	2 – 1	Viking	Bodø
CET (UTC+1)	Goal	Report	Goal	Stadium: Nordlandshallen

13 February 1993	Molde	3 – 1	Averøykameratene	Molde
CET (UTC+1)	Goal	Report	Goal	Stadium: Lubbenes kunstgress

2 March 1993	Molde	5 – 1	Aalesund	Molde
CET (UTC+1)	Goal	Report	Goal	Stadium: Lubbenes kunstgress

5 March 1993	Molde	4 – 3	Rosenborg	Molde
CET (UTC+1)	Goal	Report	Goal	Stadium: Lubbenes kunstgress

10 March 1993	Molde	1 – 3	Hødd	Molde
CET (UTC+1)	Goal	Report	Goal	Stadium: Lubbenes kunstgress

16 March 1993	Molde (Norway)	1 – 4	(Sweden) Norrköping	Cyprus
CET (UTC+1)	Goal	Report	Goal

18 March 1993	Molde	1 – 1	Brann	Cyprus
CET (UTC+1)	Goal	Report	Goal

21 March 1993	Molde (Norway)	0 – 0	(Sweden) Spånga	Cyprus
CET (UTC+1)		Report

26 March 1993	Rosenborg	3 – 1	Molde	Trondheim
CET (UTC+1)	Goal	Report	Goal	Stadium: Strindheim kunstgress

3 April 1993	Molde	0 – 0	Strindheim	Harøy
CET (UTC+1)		Report

7 April 1993	Molde	0 – 0	HamKam	Harøy
CET (UTC+1)		Report

14 April 1993	Molde	0 – 1	Hødd	Rekdal, Vestnes Municipality
CET (UTC+1)		Report	Goal

18 April 1993	Bryne	2 – 1	Molde	Bryne
CET (UTC+1)	Goal	Report	Goal

25 April 1993	Molde	1 – 0	Bodø/Glimt	Torvikbukt, Gjemnes Municipality
CET (UTC+1)	Goal	Report

== Competitions ==
=== Tippeligaen ===
==== Results summary ====
Overall								Home						Away					
Pld	W	D	L	GF	GA	GD	Pts	W	D	L	GF	GA	GD	W	D	L	GF	GA	GD
22	5	7	10	23	36	−13	22	4	4	3	14	12	+2	1	3	7	9	24	−15

Source: nifs.no

==== Positions by round ====
Round	1	2	3	4	5	6	7	8	9	10	11	12	13	14	15	16	17	18	19	20	21	22
Ground	H	A	A	H	A	H	A	H	A	H	A	A	H	H	A	H	A	H	A	H	A	H
Result	D	D	D	L	L	W	L	L	L	D	W	L	D	W	L	W	L	W	L	D	D	L
Position	5	7	8	11	11	10	11	12	12	12	10	12	12	12	12	10	10	8	9	9	10	10

Source: see below

==== Results ====
2 May 1993 1	Molde	1 – 1	Fyllingen	Molde
18:00 CET (UTC+1)	Strand 14'	Report	Høysæther 51'	Stadium: Molde Stadion; Attendance: 3,350; Referee: Svein G. Hermansen

9 May 1993 2	HamKam	1 – 1	Molde	Hamar
18:00 CET (UTC+1)	Belsvik 62'	Report	Sundgot 71'	Stadium: Briskeby; Attendance: 3,060; Referee: Arild Thorp

16 May 1993 3	Brann	1 – 1	Molde	Bergen
18:00 CET (UTC+1)	Eskelinen 39'	Report	Sundgot 52'	Stadium: Brann Stadion; Attendance: 23,163; Referee: Rune Pedersen

20 May 1993 4	Molde	0 – 2	Bodø/Glimt	Molde
18:00 CET (UTC+1)		Report	Staurvik 26'; Brattbakk 28'	Stadium: Molde Stadion; Attendance: 4,602; Referee: Thorbjørn Aass

23 May 1993 5	Start	4 – 0	Molde	Kristiansand
18:00 CET (UTC+1)	Strandli 4', 18', 84'; Tønnessen 37'	Report		Stadium: Kristiansand Stadion; Attendance: 6,387; Referee: Håkon Bondal

13 June 1993 7	Lyn	5 – 3	Molde	Oslo
18:00 CET (UTC+1)	Kolle 60' (pen.), 79' (pen.); Michelsen 63'; Kaasa 75'; Amundsen 86'	Report	Nevstad 12' (pen.); Hestad 50'; Flaco 83'	Stadium: Ullevaal Stadion; Attendance: 5,903; Referee: Lars Olav Rogstad

16 June 1993 6	Molde	3 – 2	Viking	Molde
19:00 CET (UTC+1)	Strand 28', 86'; Rudi 65'	Report	Østenstad 57'; Tveit 72'	Stadium: Molde Stadion; Attendance: 3,012; Referee: Terje Singsaas

20 June 1993 8	Molde	0 – 2	Rosenborg	Molde
18:00 CET (UTC+1)		Report	Sørloth 59'; Løken 88'	Stadium: Molde Stadion; Attendance: 7,029; Referee: Tore Hollung

27 June 1993 9	Lillestrøm	3 – 0	Molde	Lillestrøm
18:00 CET (UTC+1)	Bjarmann 65'; Karlsson 76', 90'	Report		Stadium: Åråsen Stadion; Attendance: 4,445; Referee: Sven Kjelbrott

4 July 1993 10	Molde	1 – 1	Kongsvinger	Molde
18:00 CET (UTC+1)	Sønderland 68'	Report	Håpnes 30'	Stadium: Molde Stadion; Attendance: 2,465; Referee: Terje Hauge

18 July 1993 11	Tromsø	0 – 1	Molde	Tromsø
18:00 CET (UTC+1)	Kræmer (red card) 48'	Report	Kristiansen (penalty missed); Rudi 48' (pen.)	Stadium: Alfheim Stadion; Attendance: 3,881; Referee: Sven Kjelbrott

25 July 1993 12	Fyllingen	2 – 1	Molde	Bergen
18:00 CET (UTC+1)	Berntsen 61' (pen.); Høysæther 74'	Report	Strand 26'	Stadium: Varden Amfi; Attendance: 1,739; Referee: Frode Kvam

1 August 1993 13	Molde	0 – 0	HamKam	Molde
18:00 CET (UTC+1)		Report	Belsvik (penalty missed)	Stadium: Molde Stadion; Attendance: 3,082; Referee: Rune Pedersen

8 August 1993 14	Molde	2 – 0	Brann	Molde
18:00 CET (UTC+1)	Strand 28', 80'	Report		Stadium: Molde Stadion; Attendance: 3,940; Referee: Tore Hollung

15 August 1993 15	Bodø/Glimt	3 – 0	Molde	Bodø
18:00 CET (UTC+1)	Johnsen 19'; Berstad 35'; Normark 80'	Report	Rudi (penalty missed)	Stadium: Aspmyra Stadion; Attendance: 5,720; Referee: Terje Hauge

22 August 1993 16	Molde	1 – 0	Start	Molde
18:00 CET (UTC+1)	Kinsey 64'	Report		Stadium: Molde Stadion; Attendance: 2,943; Referee: Thorbjørn Aass

29 August 1993 17	Viking	1 – 0	Molde	Stavanger
18:00 CET (UTC+1)	Ulfstein 62'	Report		Stadium: Stavanger Stadion; Attendance: 6,801; Referee: Per-Arne Larsgård

5 September 1993 18	Molde	6 – 3	Lyn	Molde
18:00 CET (UTC+1)	Hoftun 1', 21', 67', 79'; Strand 33', 41'	Report	Johnsen 24'; Wæhler 45' (pen.); Kaasa 52'	Stadium: Molde Stadion; Attendance: 2,005; Referee: Terje Singsaas

12 September 1993 19	Rosenborg	2 – 0	Molde	Trondheim
15:00 CET (UTC+1)	Skammelsrud 5'; Løken 58'	Report		Stadium: Lerkendal Stadion; Attendance: 10,960; Referee: Håkon Bondal

26 September 1993 20	Molde	0 – 0	Lillestrøm	Molde
15:00 CET (UTC+1)		Report		Stadium: Molde Stadion; Attendance: 3,556; Referee: Arild Thorp

3 October 1993 21	Kongsvinger	2 – 2	Molde	Kongsvinger
15:00 CET (UTC+1)	Engerbakk 14'; Frigård 42'	Report	Strande 3'; Strand 29'	Stadium: Gjemselund Stadion; Attendance: 2,852; Referee: Svein G. Hermansen

17 October 1993 22	Molde	0 – 1	Tromsø	Molde
13:00 CET (UTC+1)		Report	Rushfeldt 46'	Stadium: Molde Stadion; Attendance: 2,740; Referee: Tore Hollung

==== League table ====
Pos	Team	Pld	W	D	L	GF	GA	GD	Pts	Qualification or relegation
8	Kongsvinger	22	7	4	11	33	41	−8	25	
9	Start	22	6	5	11	26	29	−3	23	
10	Molde (R)	22	5	7	10	23	36	−13	22	Qualification for the relegation play-offs
11	Lyn (R)	22	6	4	12	39	53	−14	22	Relegation to First Division
12	Fyllingen (R)	22	4	5	13	21	55	−34	17	Relegation to First Division

Source: fotball.no
(R) Relegated

=== Relegation play-offs ===
Due to their tenth-place finish in Tippeligaen, Molde contested in the play-offs for qualification to next season's Tippeligaen. Molde drew in the away game against Bryne (2nd in the 1. divisjon - Group B) and lost at home against Strømsgodset (2nd in the 1. divisjon - Group A). Strømsgodset won both their games and were promoted to Tippeligaen. Molde were relegated to the 1. divisjon.

23 October 1993 1	Bryne	2 – 2	Molde	Bryne
CEST (UTC+1)	Bø 17'; Oldeide 66' (pen.); Oldeide (red card) ?'	Report	Strande 16'; Sønderland 49'	Stadium: Bryne Stadion; Attendance: 1,727; Referee: Arild Haugstad, Faaberg

27 October 1993 2	Molde	0 – 2	Strømsgodset	Molde
CEST (UTC+2)		Report	Kuvicek 16'; Bakke 58'	Stadium: Molde Stadion; Attendance: 3,526; Referee: Roy Helge Olsen, Lyn

Pos	Team	Pld	W	D	L	GF	GA	GD	Pts	Qualification or relegation
1	Strømsgodset (O, P)	2	2	0	0	4	0	+4	6	Promotion to Tippeligaen
2	Molde (R)	2	0	1	1	2	4	−2	1	Relegation to 1. divisjon
3	Bryne	2	0	1	1	2	4	−2	1	Remained in 1. divisjon

Source: rsssf.no
(O) Play-off winners; (P) Promoted; (R) Relegated

=== Norwegian Cup ===
12 May 1993 First round	Clausenengen	1 – 6	Molde	Kristiansund
CEST (UTC+2)	Solskjær 22'	Report	Kristiansen 16'; Øystein Neerland 30', 58', 70'; Rudi 80'; Strand 86'	Attendance: 300

26 May 1993 Second round	Byåsen	0 – 3	Molde	Trondheim
CEST (UTC+2)		Report	Strand 7', 11'	Attendance: 800

22 June 1993 Third round	Molde	1 – 0	Strindheim	Molde
CEST (UTC+2)	Hestad 70'	Report		Stadium: Molde Stadion

21 July 1993 Fourth round	Fana	0 – 6	Molde	Bergen
CEST (UTC+2)		Report	Hestad 29'; S. Rekdal 44'; Strande 50'; Rudi 62' (pen.); Neerland 63'; Ildhusøy 81'	Stadium: Varden Amfi; Attendance: 1,000; Referee: Per Arne Larsgård

18 August 1993 Quarter-final	Brann	2 – 0	Molde	Bergen
CEST (UTC+2)	A. Stavrum 25'; O. Stavrum 40'	Report		Stadium: Brann Stadion; Attendance: 12,320; Referee: Arlid Thorp

== Squad statistics ==
=== Appearances and goals ===
Lacking information:

- Appearance statistics from Norwegian Cup quarter-final and relegation play-offs 1st leg are incomplete.
- One goalscorer in Norwegian Cup second round (against Byåsen) is missing.

No.	Pos	Nat	Player	Total		Tippeligaen		Norwegian Cup		Play-offs	
No.	Pos	Nat	Player	Apps	Goals	Apps	Goals	Apps	Goals	Apps	Goals
	DF	(Scotland) SCO	Arthur Albiston	10	0	9	0	0	0	1	0
	GK	(Norway) NOR	Morten Bakke	28	0	22	0	4	0	2	0
	DF	(Norway) NOR	Sindre Eid	1	0	0	0	0+1	0	0	0
	DF	(Spain) ESP	Flaco	20	1	18	1	2	0	0	0
	MF	(Norway) NOR	Stig Hasselvold	9	0	5+1	0	3	0	0	0
	MF	(Norway) NOR	Daniel Berg Hestad	18	3	6+9	1	3	2	0	0
	DF	(Norway) NOR	Erik Hoftun	28	4	22	4	4	0	2	0
	FW	(Norway) NOR	Kjell Gunnar Ildhusøy	4	1	0+2	0	0+1	1	0+1	0
	MF	(Norway) NOR	Tarje Nordstrand Jacobsen	16	0	7+4	0	3+1	0	0+1	0
	FW	(England) ENG	Steve Kinsey	4	1	4	1	0	0	0	0
	FW	(Norway) NOR	Hans Ivar Klefstad	1	0	0+1	0	0	0	0	0
	MF	(Norway) NOR	Morten Kristiansen	24	1	12+8	0	3+1	1	0	0
	DF	(Norway) NOR	Ulrich Møller	24	0	20	0	4	0	0	0
	FW	(Norway) NOR	Øystein Neerland	19	4	11+4	0	2+1	4	1	0
	MF	(Norway) NOR	André Nevstad	16	1	11+1	1	3	0	1	0
	DF	(Norway) NOR	Sindre Rekdal	25	1	16+3	0	4	1	2	0
	MF	(Norway) NOR	Petter Rudi	29	4	22	2	5	2	2	0
	MF	(Norway) NOR	Roar Strand	29	12	22	9	5	3	2	0
	DF	(Norway) NOR	Trond Strande	21	3	16	1	3	1	2	1
	FW	(Norway) NOR	Ole Bjørn Sundgot	5	2	4	2	1	0	0	0
	DF	(Norway) NOR	Roger Svendsen	2	0	2	0	0	0	0	0
	MF	(Norway) NOR	Berdon Sønderland	16	2	12	1	0+2	0	2	1

=== Goalscorers ===
Rank	Position	Nat.	Player	Tippeligaen	Norwegian Cup	Play-offs	Total
1	MF	(Norway)	Roar Strand	9	3	0	12
2	MF	(Norway)	Petter Rudi	2	2	0	4
2	FW	(Norway)	Øystein Neerland	0	4	0	4
4	DF	(Norway)	Erik Hoftun	3	0	0	3
4	MF	(Norway)	Daniel Berg Hestad	1	2	0	3
4	DF	(Norway)	Trond Strande	1	1	1	3
7	FW	(Norway)	Ole Bjørn Sundgot	2	0	0	2
7	MF	(Norway)	Berdon Sønderland	1	0	1	2
9	DF	(Spain)	Flaco	1	0	0	1
9	FW	(England)	Steve Kinsey	1	0	0	1
9	MF	(Norway)	André Nevstad	1	0	0	1
9	FW	(Norway)	Kjell Gunnar Ildhusøy	0	1	0	1
9	MF	(Norway)	Morten Kristiansen	0	1	0	1
9	DF	(Norway)	Sindre Rekdal	0	1	0	1
			Unknown	0	1	0	1
			TOTALS	22	16	2	40

== See also ==
- Molde FK seasons
