= 1994 Molde FK season =

Molde
1994 season
- Chairman: Sondre Kåfjord
- Head coach: Åge Hareide
- Stadium: Molde Stadion
- 1. divisjon, group 2: 2nd (promoted)
- Norwegian Cup: Winners
- Top goalscorer: League: Arild Stavrum (19); All: Arild Stavrum (26)
- Highest home attendance: 7,343 vs Rosenborg (3 September 1994)

The 1994 season was Molde's seventh season in the second tier of Norwegian football since 1963, the first since their last promotion to the first tier in 1983. This season Molde competed in 1. divisjon and the Norwegian Cup.

In 1. divisjon's group 2, Molde finished in 2nd position, 4 points behind winners Hødd and was promoted to the 1995 Tippeligaen.

Molde participated in the 1994 Norwegian Cup. They won the final 3–2 against Lyn and won their first major trophy in the club's history.

== Squad ==
Source: Note: Flags indicate national team as defined under FIFA eligibility rules; some limited exceptions apply. Players may hold more than one non-FIFA nationality.

No.	Pos.	Nation	Player
—	GK	NOR	Morten Bakke
—	GK	NOR	Trond Hjelle
—	DF	NOR	Sindre Eid
—	DF	ESP	Flaco
—	DF	NOR	Knut Anders Fostervold
—	DF	NOR	Ulrich Møller (Captain)
—	DF	NOR	Sindre Rekdal
—	DF	NOR	Trond Strande
—	MF	NOR	Jan Berg
—	MF	NOR	Daniel Berg Hestad
—	MF	NOR	Tarje Nordstrand Jacobsen

No.	Pos.	Nation	Player
—	MF	NOR	André Nevstad
—	MF	NOR	Kjetil Rekdal (on loan from Lierse)
—	MF	NOR	Petter Rudi
—	MF	NOR	Berdon Sønderland
—	FW	NOR	Tor Eskil Grande
—	FW	NOR	Tor Gunnar Johnsen
—	FW	NOR	Hans Ivar Klefstad
—	FW	NOR	Arild Stavrum
—	FW	NOR	Ole Bjørn Sundgot
—		NOR	Frode Kvalshaug
—		NOR	Robert Pettersen

== Friendlies ==
12 February 1994	Molde	0 – 3	Rosenborg	Tromsø
CET (UTC+1)		Report	Goal

13 February 1994	Molde	2 – 2	Brann	Tromsø
CET (UTC+1)	Goal	Report	Goal

28 February 1994	Molde	1 – 1	Langevåg	Molde
CET (UTC+1)	Goal	Report	Goal	Stadium: Lubbenes kunstgressbane

3 March 1994	Molde	3 – 1	Aalesund	Molde
CET (UTC+1)	Goal	Report	Goal	Stadium: Lubbenes kunstgressbane

5 March 1994	Molde	2 – 0	Hødd	Molde
CET (UTC+1)	Goal	Report		Stadium: Lubbenes kunstgressbane

9 March 1994	Molde	3 – 3	Brann	Molde
CET (UTC+1)	Goal	Report	Goal	Stadium: Lubbenes kunstgressbane

11 March 1994	Molde	0 – 7	Rosenborg	Molde
CET (UTC+1)		Report	Goal	Stadium: Lubbenes kunstgressbane

19 March 1994	Molde	1 – 2	Nardo	Molde
CET (UTC+1)	Goal	Report	Goal	Stadium: Lubbenes kunstgressbane

22 March 1994	Molde	6 – 0	Åndalsnes	Molde
CET (UTC+1)	Goal	Report		Stadium: Lubbenes kunstgressbane

26 March 1994	Molde	3 – 4	Aalesund	Molde
CET (UTC+1)	Goal	Report	Goal	Stadium: Lubbenes kunstgressbane

28 March 1994	Molde	3 – 0	Hødd	Molde
CET (UTC+1)	Goal	Report		Stadium: Lubbenes kunstgressbane

6 April 1994	Chester (England)	2 – 6	(Norway) Molde	England
CET (UTC+1)	Goal	Report	Goal

8 April 1994	Oldham Athletic U (England)	0 – 0	(Norway) Molde	England
CET (UTC+1)		Report

10 April 1994	HamKam	1 – 1	Molde	Hamar
CET (UTC+1)	Goal	Report	Goal

17 April 1994	Hødd	4 – 2	Molde	Ulsteinvik
CET (UTC+1)	Goal	Report	Goal	Stadium: Høddvoll Stadion

23 April 1994	Molde	4 – 1	Stjørdals-Blink	Torvikbukt, Gjemnes Municipality
CET (UTC+1)	Goal	Report	Goal

2 August 1994	Molde (Norway)	0 – 1	(England) Oldham Athletic	Molde
CET (UTC+1)		Report	Goal	Stadium: Molde Stadion

8 October 1994	Stabæk	3 – 1	Molde	Oslo
CET (UTC+1)	Goal	Report	Goal

15 October 1994	Molde	6 – 3	Aalesund	Molde
CET (UTC+1)	Goal	Report	Goal	Stadium: Molde Stadion

== Competitions ==
=== 1. divisjon ===
==== Results summary ====
Overall								Home						Away					
Pld	W	D	L	GF	GA	GD	Pts	W	D	L	GF	GA	GD	W	D	L	GF	GA	GD
22	13	3	6	44	25	+19	42	8	1	2	27	8	+19	5	2	4	17	17	0

Source: nifs.no

==== Positions by round ====
Round	1	2	3	4	5	6	7	8	9	10	11	12	13	14	15	16	17	18	19	20	21	22
Ground	A	H	A	H	A	H	H	A	H	A	H	H	A	H	A	H	A	A	H	A	H	A
Result	W	W	L	W	D	W	W	W	L	D	W	D	L	L	W	W	W	W	W	L	W	L
Position	5	2	4	2	3	2	1	1	3	3	3	2	2	4	4	3	2	2	2	2	2	2

Source: see below

==== Results ====
1 May 1994 1	Åndalsnes	0 – 1	Molde	Åndalsnes
18:00 CET (UTC+1)		Report	Nevstad 40' (pen.)	Stadium: Øran Stadion; Attendance: 2,578

8 May 1994 2	Molde	2 – 1	Hødd	Molde
CET (UTC+1)	Flaco 70'; Sønderland 90'	Report	12'	Stadium: Molde Stadion; Attendance: 2,500

15 May 1994 3	Fana	1 – 0	Molde	Bergen
18:00 CET (UTC+1)	Unknown 23'	Report		Stadium: Fana Stadion

23 May 1994 4	Molde	1 – 0	Vard	Molde
18:00 CET (UTC+1)	Rudi 76'	Report		Stadium: Molde Stadion

29 May 1994 5	Bryne	2 – 2	Molde	Bryne
18:00 CET (UTC+1)	Unknown 2'; Unknown 74' (pen.)	Report	Sundgot 19', 81'	Stadium: Bryne Stadion; Attendance: 995

5 June 1994 6	Molde	5 – 1	Jevnaker	Molde
CET (UTC+1)	Stavrum 8', 13', 50', 90'; Rudi 28'	Report	Unknown 89'	Stadium: Molde Stadion

12 June 1994 7	Molde	4 – 1	Mjøndalen	Molde
CET (UTC+1)	Nevstad 40'; Stavrum 59', 63', 77'	Report	Unknown 13'; Unknown (red card)	Stadium: Molde Stadion

19 June 1994 8	Åsane	0 – 1	Molde	Bergen
18:00 CET (UTC+1)	Unknown (penalty missed)	Report	Fostervold 20'	Stadium: Myrdal Stadion

26 June 1994 9	Molde	0 – 1	Fyllingen	Molde
18:00 CET (UTC+1)		Report	Unknown 30'	Stadium: Molde Stadion; Attendance: 1,751

3 July 1994 10	Vidar	0 – 0	Molde	Stavanger
18:00 CET (UTC+1)		Report		Stadium: Lassa gressbane

10 July 1994 11	Molde	2 – 0	Eik-Tønsberg	Molde
18:00 CET (UTC+1)	Sundgot 7', 65'	Report		Stadium: Molde Stadion; Attendance: 1,169

17 July 1994 12	Molde	0 – 0	Åndalsnes	Molde
18:00 CET (UTC+1)	Møller (red card) 60'	Report		Stadium: Molde Stadion

24 July 1994 13	Hødd	3 – 0	Molde	Ulsteinvik
CET (UTC+1)	Unknown 47'; Unknown 57' (pen.); Unknown 90'	Report		Stadium: Høddvoll Stadion; Attendance: 3,000

7 August 1994 14	Molde	2 – 3	Fana	Molde
18:00 CET (UTC+1)	S. Rekdal 10' (pen.); Stavrum 43'	Report	Unknown; Unknown; Unknown	Stadium: Molde Stadion; Attendance: 1,667

14 August 1994 15	Vard	0 – 2	Molde	Haugesund
CET (UTC+1)		Report	K. Rekdal 41'; Flaco 74'	Stadium: Haugesund Stadion; Attendance: 701

21 August 1994 16	Molde	4 – 1	Bryne	Molde
18:00 CET (UTC+1)	Johnsen 16'; Berg 20'; Stavrum 45', 46'	Report	Unknown 65'	Stadium: Molde Stadion; Attendance: 2,264

25 August 1994 18	Mjøndalen	1 – 4	Molde	Mjøndalen
CET (UTC+1)	Unknown 41'	Report	Fostervold 6'; Stavrum 15', 83', 88'	Stadium: Nedre Eiker Stadion; Attendance: 427

28 August 1994 17	Jevnaker	0 – 4	Molde	Jevnaker
CET (UTC+1)		Report	Stavrum 13', 90'; Sundgot 76'; K. Rekdal ?'	Stadium: Jevnaker Stadion; Attendance: 1,500

31 August 1994 19	Molde	3 – 0	Åsane	Molde
17:45 CET (UTC+1)	K. Rekdal 44', 55'; Sundgot 65'	Report		Stadium: Molde Stadion; Attendance: 1,913

18 September 1994 20	Fyllingen	7 – 1	Molde	Bergen
CET (UTC+1)	Goal	Report	Sundgot 62'	Stadium: Varden Amfi; Attendance: 700

25 September 1994 21	Molde	4 – 0	Vidar	Molde
CET (UTC+1)	Sundgot 15'; Stavrum 19', 68', 89'	Report		Stadium: Molde Stadion; Attendance: 1,708

2 October 1994 22	Eik-Tønsberg	3 – 1	Molde	Tønsberg
13:00 CET (UTC+1)	47'; 56'; 59'	Report	Stavrum 45'; Sundgot 83'	Stadium: Tønsberg gressbane

==== League table ====
Pos	Team	Pld	W	D	L	GF	GA	GD	Pts	Promotion, qualification or relegation
1	Hødd (C, P)	22	14	4	4	52	22	+30	46	Promotion to Tippeligaen
2	Molde (P)	22	13	3	6	44	25	+19	42	Cup Winners' Cup qualifying and promotion to Tippeligaen (Note: Molde qualified for the Cup Winners' Cup as Norwegian Cup winners.)
3	Fyllingen	22	12	5	5	45	25	+20	41	
4	Eik-Tønsberg	22	10	5	7	40	30	+10	35	
5	Bryne	22	8	6	8	36	36	0	30	

Source: fotball.no
(C) Champions; (P) Promoted

=== Norwegian Cup ===
4 May 1994 First round	Surnadal	1 – 4	Molde	Surnadal
CEST (UTC+2)	Henden 3'	Report	Sundgot 9'; Rudi 25'; Hestad 67', 72'	Stadium: Syltøran Stadion; Attendance: 340; Referee: Jan Roger Strømsvåg

19 May 1994 Second round	Ørsta	1 – 8	Molde	Ørsta
CEST (UTC+2)	83'	Report	Fostervold 3'; Sundgot 14'; Stavrum 23', 24', 37', 65', 74'; Nevstad 78' (pen.)

8 June 1994 Third round	Orkdal	1 – 2	Molde	Fannrem
CEST (UTC+2)	Staveli 82'	Report	Sundgot 34', 89'	Stadium: Fannremsmoen Stadion; Attendance: 950

20 July 1994 Fourth round	Molde	4 – 3	Jevnaker	Molde
CEST (UTC+2)	Klefstad 9', 25'; Fostervold 15'; Hestad 87'	Report	Løhre 47', 67'; Bondehagen 64'	Stadium: Molde Stadion; Attendance: 1,495; Referee: Svein G. Hermansen

17 August 1994 Quarter-final	Molde	2 – 0	Tromsø	Molde
CEST (UTC+2)	K. Rekdal 29' (pen.); Berg 43'	Report		Stadium: Molde Stadion; Attendance: 4,066; Referee: Terje Hauge

3 September 1994 Semi-final 1st leg	Molde	2 – 1	Rosenborg	Molde
CEST (UTC+2)	Johnsen 73'; Stavrum 78'	Report	Bergersen 40'	Stadium: Molde Stadion; Attendance: 7,343; Referee: Rune Pedersen

10 September 1994 Semi-final 2nd leg	Rosenborg	2 – 2 (2 – 3 agg.)	Molde	Trondheim
CEST (UTC+2)	Brattbakk 31'; Kaasa 85'	Report	Sundgot 20'; K. Rekdal 66'	Stadium: Lerkendal Stadion; Attendance: 10,845; Referee: Sven Kjelbrott

==== Final ====
23 October 1994
13:15 CEST (UTC+2)
Final

Molde	3 – 2	Lyn
Jacobsen 12'; Sundgot 42'; Stavrum 48'	Report	Tessem 9'; Sørensen 59'

Ullevaal Stadion, Oslo
Attendance: 24,524
Referee: Terje Singsaas (Rosenborg)

== Squad statistics ==
=== Appearances and goals ===
Appearance statistics from Norwegian Cup rounds 2–4 are incomplete.

No.	Pos	Nat	Player	Total		1. divisjon		Norwegian Cup	
No.	Pos	Nat	Player	Apps	Goals	Apps	Goals	Apps	Goals
	GK	(Norway) NOR	Morten Bakke	28	0	22	0	6	0
	MF	(Norway) NOR	Jan Berg	8	2	2+4	1	1+1	1
	DF	(Spain) ESP	Flaco	25	2	18+2	2	5	0
	DF	(Norway) NOR	Knut Anders Fostervold	28	4	21+1	2	6	2
	FW	(Norway) NOR	Tom-Eskil Grande	2	0	0+1	0	0+1	0
	MF	(Norway) NOR	Daniel Berg Hestad	25	3	9+10	0	4+2	3
	MF	(Norway) NOR	Tarje Nordstrand Jacobsen	14	1	9+2	0	3	1
	FW	(Norway) NOR	Tor Gunnar Johnsen	19	2	11+3	1	2+3	1
	FW	(Norway) NOR	Hans Ivar Klefstad	8	2	2+4	0	1+1	2
		(Norway) NOR	Frode Kvalshaug	5	0	2+2	0	1	0
	DF	(Norway) NOR	Ulrich Møller	20	0	15+1	0	4	0
	MF	(Norway) NOR	André Nevstad	17	3	12+1	2	3+1	1
		(Norway) NOR	Robert Pettersen	1	0	0+1	0	0	0
	MF	(Norway) NOR	Kjetil Rekdal	12	6	8	4	4	2
	DF	(Norway) NOR	Sindre Rekdal	21	1	15+2	1	4	0
	MF	(Norway) NOR	Petter Rudi	26	3	22	2	4	1
	FW	(Norway) NOR	Arild Stavrum	28	26	21+1	19	6	7
	DF	(Norway) NOR	Trond Strande	23	0	19	0	4	0
	FW	(Norway) NOR	Ole Bjørn Sundgot	20	15	12+2	9	6	6
	MF	(Norway) NOR	Berdon Sønderland	24	1	20+1	1	3	0

=== Goalscorers ===
Rank	Position	Nat.	Player	1. divisjon	Norwegian Cup	Total
1	FW	(Norway)	Arild Stavrum	19	7	26
2	FW	(Norway)	Ole Bjørn Sundgot	9	6	15
3	MF	(Norway)	Kjetil Rekdal	4	2	6
4	DF	(Norway)	Knut Anders Fostervold	2	2	4
5	MF	(Norway)	Daniel Berg Hestad	0	3	3
5	MF	(Norway)	André Nevstad	2	1	3
5	MF	(Norway)	Petter Rudi	2	1	3
8	DF	(Spain)	Flaco	2	0	2
8	MF	(Norway)	Jan Berg	1	1	2
8	FW	(Norway)	Tor Gunnar Johnsen	1	1	2
8	FW	(Norway)	Hans Ivar Klefstad	0	2	2
12	DF	(Norway)	Sindre Rekdal	1	0	1
12	MF	(Norway)	Berdon Sønderland	1	0	1
12	MF	(Norway)	Tarje Nordstrand Jacobsen	0	1	1
			TOTALS	44	27	71

== See also ==
- Molde FK seasons
