= 1992 Molde FK season =

Molde
1992 season
- Chairman: Sondre Kåfjord
- Head coaches: Jan Fuglset; Ulrich Møller
- Stadium: Molde Stadion
- Tippeligaen: 6th
- Norwegian Cup: Third Round vs. Melhus
- Top goalscorer: League: Ole Bjørn Sundgot (12); All: Ole Bjørn Sundgot (16)
- Highest home attendance: 8,099 vs Rosenborg (9 August 1992)
- Average home league attendance: 4,133

The 1992 season was Molde's 18th season in the top flight of Norwegian football. This season Molde competed in Tippeligaen and the Norwegian Cup.

In Tippeligaen, Molde finished in 6th position, 10 points behind winners Rosenborg.

Molde participated in the 1992 Norwegian Cup. They reached the third round where they were knocked out by third tier side Melhus after losing 1–2 at home ground.

== Squad ==
Source: Note: Flags indicate national team as defined under FIFA eligibility rules; some limited exceptions apply. Players may hold more than one non-FIFA nationality.

No.	Pos.	Nation	Player
—	GK	NOR	Morten Bakke
—	GK	NOR	Are Lervik
—	DF	SCO	Arthur Albiston
—	DF	NOR	Erik Hoftun
—	DF	ESP	Flaco
—	DF	NOR	Sindre Eid
—	DF	NOR	Ulrich Møller (Captain)
—	DF	NOR	Sindre Rekdal
—	DF	NOR	Roger Svendsen
—	DF	NOR	Trond Strande
—	MF	NOR	Jan Berg
—	MF	NOR	Stig Hasselvold

No.	Pos.	Nation	Player
—	MF	NOR	Tarje Nordstrand Jacobsen
—	MF	NOR	Jahn Richard Johnsen
—	MF	NOR	Morten Kristiansen
—	MF	NOR	Petter Rudi
—	FW	NOR	Stein Jørgen Dahle
—	FW	NOR	Kjell Gunnar Ildhusøy
—	FW	ENG	Paul Moulden (on loan from Oldham Athletic)
—	FW	NOR	Øystein Neerland
—	FW	NOR	Ole Bjørn Sundgot
—		NOR	Per A. Gjerdalen
—		NOR	Mads Kringstad
—		NOR	Svend J. Svendsen

== Friendlies ==
15 February 1992	Molde	4 – 2	Averøykameratene	Molde
CET (UTC+1)	Goal	Report	Goal	Stadium: Lubbenes kunstgress

23 February 1992	Molde	2 – 1	Hødd	Molde
CET (UTC+1)	Goal	Report	Goal	Stadium: Lubbenes kunstgress

6 March 1992	Molde	0 – 1	Sogndal	Molde
CET (UTC+1)		Report	Goal	Stadium: Lubbenes kunstgress

14 March 1992	Molde (Norway)	0 – 1	(Sweden) Hässleholm	Cyprus
CET (UTC+1)		Report	Goal

16 March 1992	Molde (Norway)	0 – 1	(Sweden) Örebro	Cyprus
CET (UTC+1)		Report	Goal

18 March 1992	Molde	0 – 3	Tromsø	Cyprus
CET (UTC+1)		Report	Goal

5 April 1992	Molde	2 – 1	Strindheim	Sunndalsøra
CET (UTC+1)	Goal	Report	Goal

11 April 1992	Aalesund	4 – 4	Molde	Ålesund
CET (UTC+1)	Goal	Report	Goal

15 April 1992	Molde	1 – 1	Hødd	Rekdal, Vestnes
CET (UTC+1)	Goal	Report	Goal

20 April 1992	Bryne	2 – 0	Molde	Bryne
CET (UTC+1)	Goal	Report

== Competitions ==
=== Tippeligaen ===
==== Results summary ====
Overall								Home						Away					
Pld	W	D	L	GF	GA	GD	Pts	W	D	L	GF	GA	GD	W	D	L	GF	GA	GD
22	11	3	8	30	30	0	36	6	2	3	15	10	+5	5	1	5	15	20	−5

Source: nifs.no

==== Positions by round ====
Round	1	2	3	4	5	6	7	8	9	10	11	12	13	14	15	16	17	18	19	20	21	22
Ground	H	A	A	H	A	H	A	H	A	H	A	A	H	H	A	H	A	H	A	H	A	H
Result	W	W	L	W	L	L	L	D	W	L	D	W	W	W	W	W	W	L	L	D	L	W
Position	6	2	5	3	5	6	8	8	5	8	7	6	6	6	6	5	4	4	4	5	6	6

Source: see below

==== Results ====
26 April 1992 1	Molde	1 – 0	Tromsø	Molde
CET (UTC+1)	Sundgot 88'	Report		Stadium: Molde Stadion; Attendance: 3,031; Referee: Roy Helge Olsen

3 May 1992 2	Sogndal	0 – 1	Molde	Sogndalsfjøra
CET (UTC+1)		Report	Kristiansen 89'	Stadium: Fosshaugane; Attendance: 1,912; Referee: Terje Hauge

10 May 1992 3	Rosenborg	2 – 0	Molde	Trondheim
CET (UTC+1)	Sørloth 38'; Skammelsrud 46'	Report		Stadium: Lerkendal Stadion; Attendance: 14,044; Referee: Kjell Nordby

16 May 1992 4	Molde	2 – 0	Mjøndalen	Molde
CET (UTC+1)	Dahle 6', 8'	Report		Stadium: Molde Stadion; Attendance: 4,473; Referee: Bjørn Kronborg

24 May 1992 5	HamKam	3 – 0	Molde	Hamar
CET (UTC+1)	Ytterland 13', 80'; Solbakken 76'	Report		Stadium: Briskeby; Attendance: 3,643; Referee: Sven Kjelbrott

31 May 1992 6	Molde	0 – 4	Lillestrøm	Molde
CET (UTC+1)		Report	Nysæther 12', 20'; McManus 43', 54'	Stadium: Molde Stadion; Attendance: 3,128; Referee: Svein G. Hermansen

8 June 1992 7	Start	2 – 1	Molde	Kristiansand
CET (UTC+1)	Tønnessen 63'; B. T. Hansen 89'	Report	Dahle 61'	Stadium: Kristiansand Stadion; Attendance: 7,325; Referee: Arild Haugstad

14 June 1992 8	Molde	0 – 0	Viking	Molde
CET (UTC+1)		Report		Stadium: Molde Stadion; Attendance: 2,473; Referee: Thorbjørn Aass

21 June 1992 9	Brann	2 – 3	Molde	Bergen
CET (UTC+1)	Morley 78'; Nybø 83'	Report	Kristiansen 1'; Sundgot 35'; Rekdal 73'	Stadium: Brann Stadion; Attendance: 7,590; Referee: Egil Nervik

28 June 1992 10	Molde	0 – 2	Kongsvinger	Molde
CET (UTC+1)		Report	Bergman 22'; Francis 52'	Stadium: Molde Stadion; Attendance: 2,750; Referee: Arild Haugstad

5 July 1992 11	Lyn	1 – 1	Molde	Oslo
CET (UTC+1)	Olsen 71'	Report	Berg 90'	Stadium: Ullevaal Stadion; Attendance: 1,503; Referee: Erling Haugen

26 July 1992 13	Molde	3 – 0	Sogndal	Molde
CET (UTC+1)	Albiston 1'; Sundgot 42', 88'	Report		Stadium: Molde Stadion; Attendance: 3,090; Referee: Rune Pedersen

5 August 1992 12	Tromsø	1 – 3	Molde	Tromsø
CET (UTC+1)	Rushfeldt 85'	Report	Sundgot 26', 40'; Neerland 88'	Stadium: Alfheim Stadion; Attendance: 1,893; Referee: Jonny Ditlefsen

9 August 1992 14	Molde	2 – 0	Rosenborg	Molde
CET (UTC+1)	Sundgot 21', 34'	Report		Stadium: Molde Stadion; Attendance: 8,099; Referee: Tore Hollung

16 August 1992 15	Mjøndalen	0 – 4	Molde	Mjøndalen
CET (UTC+1)		Report	Dahle 7'; Rudi 40', 44'; Sundgot 87'	Stadium: Nedre Eiker Stadion; Attendance: 1,377; Referee: Terje Singsaas

23 August 1992 16	Molde	4 – 1	HamKam	Molde
CET (UTC+1)	Hoftun 11'; Sundgot 70', 84', 90'	Report	Kristiansen 81'	Stadium: Molde Stadion; Attendance: 4,720; Referee: Sven Kjelbrott

30 August 1992 17	Lillestrøm	1 – 2	Molde	Lillestrøm
CET (UTC+1)	Frigård 78'	Report	S. Rekdal 9'; Albiston 32'	Stadium: Åråsen Stadion; Attendance: 4,668; Referee: Egil Nervik

13 September 1992 18	Molde	0 – 1	Start	Molde
CET (UTC+1)		Report	Strandli 90'	Stadium: Molde Stadion; Attendance: 5,974; Referee: Terje Hauge

20 September 1992 19	Viking	5 – 0	Molde	Stavanger
CET (UTC+1)	Fjetland 25'; Meinseth 55'; Storvik 85'; Aase 87'; Solberg 88'	Report		Stadium: Stavanger Stadion; Attendance: 9,243; Referee: Egil Nervik

27 September 1992 20	Molde	1 – 1	Brann	Molde
CET (UTC+1)	Dahle 54'	Report	Soltvedt 10'	Stadium: Molde Stadion; Attendance: 3,950; Referee: Arild Thorp

4 October 1992 21	Kongsvinger	3 – 0	Molde	Kongsvinger
CET (UTC+1)	Kaasa 9', 48', 51'	Report		Stadium: Gjemselund Stadion; Attendance: 3,212; Referee: Terje Hauge

18 October 1992 22	Molde	2 – 1	Lyn	Molde
CET (UTC+1)	Neerland 36'; Albiston 82'	Report	Holte 68'	Stadium: Molde Stadion; Attendance: 2,450; Referee: Svein G. Hermansen

==== League table ====
Pos	Team	Pld	W	D	L	GF	GA	GD	Pts	Qualification or relegation
4	Lillestrøm	22	11	5	6	48	28	+20	38	Qualification for the Cup Winners' Cup qualifying round
5	Lyn	22	11	4	7	33	29	+4	37	
6	Molde	22	11	3	8	30	30	0	36	
7	Brann	22	4	12	6	26	30	−4	24	
8	Tromsø	22	6	6	10	22	37	−15	24	

Source: fotball.no

=== Norwegian Cup ===
28 May 1992 First round	Averøykameratene	0 – 5	Molde	Kristiansund
CEST (UTC+2)		Report	Sundgot 24', 60'; Moulden 45', 56'; Flaco 73'	Stadium: Atlanten Stadion; Attendance: 1,001; Referee: Roe Lien

10 June 1992 Second round	Stranda	1 – 5	Molde	Svolvær
CEST (UTC+2)	Forbord 49'	Report	Dahle 13', 23', 40'; Sundgot 48'; Bakke 75' (pen.)	Stadium: Stranda Stadion; Attendance: 478; Referee: Ola Aarheim

24 June 1992 Third round	Molde	1 – 2 (a.e.t.)	Melhus	Molde
CEST (UTC+2)	Sundgot 31'	Report	T. Hansen 72'; Kjeldsberg 108'	Stadium: Molde Stadion; Attendance: 750; Referee: Tor Sunde

== Squad statistics ==
=== Appearances and goals ===
Lacking information:

- Appearance statistics from Norwegian Cup rounds 1–2 (6–9 players in first round, 1–4 players in second round) are missing.

No.	Pos	Nat	Player	Total		Tippeligaen		Norwegian Cup	
No.	Pos	Nat	Player	Apps	Goals	Apps	Goals	Apps	Goals
	DF	(Scotland) SCO	Arthur Albiston	16	3	15	3	1	0
	GK	(Norway) NOR	Morten Bakke	24	1	22	0	2	1
	MF	(Norway) NOR	Jan Berg	13	1	6+5	1	1+1	0
	FW	(Norway) NOR	Stein Jørgen Dahle	24	8	18+4	5	2	3
	DF	(Spain) ESP	Flaco	23	1	18+2	0	3	1
	MF	(Norway) NOR	Stig Hasselvold	11	0	7+3	0	1	0
	DF	(Norway) NOR	Erik Hoftun	23	1	22	1	1	0
	FW	(Norway) NOR	Kjell Gunnar Ildhusøy	1	0	0+1	0	0	0
	MF	(Norway) NOR	Tarje Nordstrand Jacobsen	7	0	3+4	0	0	0
	MF	(Norway) NOR	Jahn Richard Johnsen	1	0	0+1	0	0	0
	MF	(Norway) NOR	Morten Kristiansen	23	2	22	2	1	0
	FW	(England) ENG	Paul Moulden	6	2	1+3	0	1+1	2
	DF	(Norway) NOR	Ulrich Møller	25	0	22	0	3	0
	FW	(Norway) NOR	Øystein Neerland	10	2	3+7	2	0	0
	FW	(Norway) NOR	Bjørn Nilsen	14	0	9+4	0	1	0
	DF	(Norway) NOR	Sindre Rekdal	21	2	18+1	2	2	0
	MF	(Norway) NOR	Petter Rudi	22	2	17+3	2	2	0
	DF	(Norway) NOR	Trond Strande	18	0	17	0	1	0
	FW	(Norway) NOR	Ole Bjørn Sundgot	25	16	22	12	3	4
	DF	(Norway) NOR	Roger Svendsen	1	0	0	0	0+1	0

=== Goalscorers ===
Rank	Position	Nat.	Player	Tippeligaen	Norwegian Cup	Total
1	FW	(Norway)	Ole Bjørn Sundgot	12	4	16
2	FW	(Norway)	Stein Jørgen Dahle	5	3	8
3	DF	(Scotland)	Arthur Albiston	3	0	3
4	MF	(Norway)	Morten Kristiansen	2	0	2
4	FW	(Norway)	Øystein Neerland	2	0	2
4	DF	(Norway)	Sindre Rekdal	2	0	2
4	MF	(Norway)	Petter Rudi	2	0	2
4	FW	(England)	Paul Moulden	0	2	2
9	MF	(Norway)	Jan Berg	1	0	1
9	DF	(Norway)	Erik Hoftun	1	0	1
9	GK	(Norway)	Morten Bakke	0	1	1
9	DF	(Spain)	Flaco	0	1	1
			TOTALS	30	11	41

== See also ==
- Molde FK seasons
