= 1991 Molde FK season =

Molde
1991 season
- Chairman: Bernt Roald
- Head coach: Åge Hareide (until 18 August); Ulrich Møller (player-coach) (from 18 August)
- Stadium: Molde Stadion
- Tippeligaen: 7th
- Norwegian Cup: Fourth Round vs. Fyllingen
- Top goalscorer: League: Øystein Neerland (11); All: Øystein Neerland (15)
- Highest home attendance: 6,258 vs Viking (1 September 1991)
- Average home league attendance: 3,298

The 1991 season was Molde's 17th season in the top flight of Norwegian football. This season Molde competed in Tippeligaen and the Norwegian Cup.

In Tippeligaen, Molde finished in 7th position, 14 points behind winners Viking.

Molde participated in the 1991 Norwegian Cup. They reached the fourth round where they were knocked out by Fyllingen after losing 3–0 at away ground.

== Squad ==
Source: Note: Flags indicate national team as defined under FIFA eligibility rules; some limited exceptions apply. Players may hold more than one non-FIFA nationality.

No.	Pos.	Nation	Player
—	GK	NOR	Morten Bakke
—	DF	NOR	Ulrich Møller (Captain)
—	DF	ENG	Adrian Pennock (on loan from Norwich City)
—	DF	NOR	Sindre Rekdal
—	DF	NOR	Geir Sperre
—	DF	NOR	Trond Strande
—	MF	NOR	Jan Berg
—	MF	NOR	Morten Kristiansen
—	MF	NOR	Jan Erlend Kruse

No.	Pos.	Nation	Player
—	MF	NOR	Øyvind Leonhardsen
—	MF	NOR	Bjørn Nilsen
—	MF	NOR	Petter Rudi
—	FW	NOR	Stein Holsvik
—	FW	NOR	Petter Belsvik
—	FW	NOR	Øystein Neerland
—	FW	NOR	Ole Bjørn Sundgot
—	FW	NOR	Frode Tømmerbakk
—		NOR	Per Arne Gjerdalen

== Competitions ==
=== Tippeligaen ===
==== Results summary ====
Overall								Home						Away					
Pld	W	D	L	GF	GA	GD	Pts	W	D	L	GF	GA	GD	W	D	L	GF	GA	GD
22	7	6	9	33	38	−5	27	4	3	4	18	22	−4	3	3	5	15	16	−1

Source: nifs.no

==== Positions by round ====
Round	1	2	3	4	5	6	7	8	9	10	11	12	13	14	15	16	17	18	19	20	21	22
Ground	A	H	H	A	H	A	H	A	H	A	H	H	A	A	H	A	H	A	H	A	H	A
Result	L	W	D	D	L	L	L	D	D	W	L	W	L	D	D	L	L	W	W	L	W	W
Position	11	5	6	5	8	9	12	12	12	11	11	11	12	12	11	12	12	11	9	9	9	7

Source: see below

==== Results ====
28 April 1991 1	Lyn	2 – 0	Molde	Oslo
CET (UTC+1)	Sundby 49'; Amundsen 85'	Report		Stadium: Ullevaal Stadion; Attendance: 7,100; Referee: Bjørn Kronborg

4 May 1991 2	Molde	4 – 1	Rosenborg	Molde
CET (UTC+1)	Neerland 8'; Belsvik 34', 49', 70'	Report	Sørloth 18'	Stadium: Molde Stadion; Attendance: 5,300; Referee: Arild Haugstad

12 May 1991 3	Molde	1 – 1	Fyllingen	Molde
CET (UTC+1)	Holsvik 84'	Report	Tengs 8'	Stadium: Molde Stadion; Attendance: 3,581; Referee: Egil Nervik

16 May 1991 4	Brann	2 – 2	Molde	Bergen
CET (UTC+1)	Nybø 17'; Hadler-Olsen 72'	Report	Neerland 10'; Holsvik 80'	Stadium: Brann Stadion; Attendance: 14,158; Referee: Erling Haugen

20 May 1991 5	Molde	0 – 4	Start	Molde
CET (UTC+1)		Report	Dahlum 21'; Klepp 47', 54'; Strømme 86'	Stadium: Molde Stadion; Attendance: 2,207; Referee: Sven Kjelbrott

26 May 1991 6	Viking	3 – 2	Molde	Stavanger
CET (UTC+1)	Håland 69'; Storvik 80'; Meinseth 87'	Report	Kruse 61'; Belsvik 70'	Stadium: Stavanger Stadion; Attendance: 10,858; Referee: Tore Hollung

9 June 1991 7	Molde	0 – 7	Strømsgodset	Molde
CET (UTC+1)		Report	Storskogen 11', 13'; Johnsen 25', 53', 87'; Nordeide 45'; Andersen 62'	Stadium: Molde Stadion; Attendance: 3,081; Referee: Terje Hauge

16 June 1991 8	Sogndal	0 – 0	Molde	Sogndalsfjøra
CET (UTC+1)		Report		Stadium: Fosshaugane; Attendance: 2,183; Referee: Bjørn Kronborg

23 June 1991 9	Molde	3 – 3	Lillestrøm	Molde
CET (UTC+1)	Belsvik 27'; Neerland 38'; Nilsen 41'	Report	Gulbrandsen 18'; Eidsvik 80'; Frigård 86'	Stadium: Molde Stadion; Attendance: 2,108; Referee: Roy Helge Olsen

30 June 1991 10	Kongsvinger	1 – 4	Molde	Kongsvinger
CET (UTC+1)	Engerbakk 59'	Report	Leonhardsen 39'; Neerland 41'; Belsvik 58'; Kristiansen 68'	Stadium: Gjemselund Stadion; Attendance: 2,743; Referee: Rune Pedersen

7 July 1991 11	Molde	1 – 2	Tromsø	Molde
CET (UTC+1)	Belsvik 46'	Report	Berg-Johansen 50'; Kræmer 66'	Stadium: Molde Stadion; Attendance: 3,402; Referee: Arild Thorp

21 July 1991 12	Molde	3 – 0	Lyn	Molde
CET (UTC+1)	Neerland 33', 61'; Belsvik 76'	Report		Stadium: Molde Stadion; Attendance: 2,860; Referee: Tore Hollung

28 July 1991 13	Rosenborg	3 – 0	Molde	Trondheim
CET (UTC+1)	Tangen 51', 90+1'; Strand 60'	Report		Stadium: Lerkendal Stadion; Attendance: 11,286; Referee: Arild Haugstad

4 August 1991 14	Fyllingen	2 – 2	Molde	Bergen
CET (UTC+1)	I. Ludvigsen 77'; Jörgensen 89'	Report	Neerland 53'; Nilsen 73'	Stadium: Krohnsminde; Attendance: 1,942; Referee: Terje Singsaas

11 August 1991 15	Molde	1 – 1	Brann	Molde
CET (UTC+1)	Neerland 5'	Report	Ahlsen 65'	Stadium: Molde Stadion; Attendance: 2,150; Referee: Sven Kjelbrott

18 August 1991 16	Start	1 – 0	Molde	Kristiansand
CET (UTC+1)	Pettersen 85'	Report		Stadium: Kristiansand Stadion; Attendance: 7,404; Referee: Roy Helge Olsen

1 September 1991 17	Molde	0 – 3	Viking	Molde
CET (UTC+1)		Report	Tveit 6', 88'; Meinseth 77'	Stadium: Molde Stadion; Attendance: 3,258; Referee: Per-Arne Larsgård

8 September 1991 18	Strømsgodset	0 – 2	Molde	Drammen
CET (UTC+1)		Report	Neerland 64'; Nilsen 67'	Stadium: Marienlyst Stadion; Attendance: 4,689; Referee: Rune Pedersen

22 September 1991 19	Molde	2 – 0	Sogndal	Molde
CET (UTC+1)	Leonhardsen 44'; Sundgot 72'	Report		Stadium: Molde Stadion; Attendance: 2,321; Referee: Kjell Nordby

29 September 1991 20	Lillestrøm	1 – 0	Molde	Lillestrøm
CET (UTC+1)	Amundsen 61'	Report		Stadium: Åråsen Stadion; Attendance: 1,822; Referee: Tore Hollung

6 October 1991 21	Molde	3 – 0	Kongsvinger	Molde
CET (UTC+1)	Neerland 48'; Sundgot 75'; Pennock 84'	Report		Stadium: Molde Stadion; Attendance: 3,005; Referee: Terje Singsaas

13 October 1991 22	Tromsø	1 – 3	Molde	Tromsø
CET (UTC+1)	Berg 68'	Report	Neerland 8'; Sundgot 18'; Kruse 61'	Stadium: Alfheim Stadion; Attendance: 2,722; Referee: Rune Pedersen

==== League table ====
Pos	Team	Pld	W	D	L	GF	GA	GD	Pts
5	Lillestrøm	22	9	4	9	31	27	+4	31
6	Tromsø	22	9	4	9	28	34	−6	31
7	Molde	22	7	6	9	33	38	−5	27
8	Kongsvinger	22	7	6	9	26	34	−8	27
9	Sogndal	22	7	6	9	22	31	−9	27

Source: fotball.no

=== Norwegian Cup ===
29 May 1991 First round	Isfjorden	0 – 8	Molde	Isfjorden
CEST (UTC+2)		Report	Holsvik 38', 39'; Belsvik 40' (pen.), 87'; Strande 58'; Neerland 66', 85'; Nilsen 68'

1991 Second round	Molde	3 – 1	Åndalsnes	Molde
CEST (UTC+2)	Neerland 4', 27'; Belsvik 73'	Report	Unknown 38'	Stadium: Molde Stadion

26 June 1991 Third round	Aalesund	1 – 2	Molde	Ålesund
CEST (UTC+2)	Unknown 90' (pen.)	Report	Pennock 3'; Belsvik 25'	Stadium: Kråmyra Stadion; Attendance: 2,000

24 July 1991 Fourth round	Fyllingen	3 – 0	Molde	Bergen
CEST (UTC+2)	Ludvigsen 3'; Unknown 39' (pen.); Unknown 45+2'	Report		Stadium: Krohnsminde; Attendance: 1,943

== Squad statistics ==
=== Appearances and goals ===
No.	Pos	Nat	Player	Total		Tippeligaen		Norwegian Cup	
No.	Pos	Nat	Player	Apps	Goals	Apps	Goals	Apps	Goals
	GK	(Norway) NOR	Morten Bakke	26	0	22	0	4	0
	FW	(Norway) NOR	Petter Belsvik	26	12	21+1	8	4	4
	MF	(Norway) NOR	Jan Berg	10	0	3+5	0	1+1	0
		(Norway) NOR	Per Arne Gjerdalen	2	0	0+2	0	0	0
	FW	(Norway) NOR	Stein Holsvik	7	4	1+4	2	1+1	2
	MF	(Norway) NOR	Morten Kristiansen	26	1	22	1	4	0
	MF	(Norway) NOR	Jan Erlend Kruse	25	2	20+1	2	4	0
	MF	(Norway) NOR	Øyvind Leonhardsen	24	2	21	2	3	0
	DF	(Norway) NOR	Ulrich Møller	26	0	22	0	4	0
	FW	(Norway) NOR	Øystein Neerland	26	15	22	11	4	4
	FW	(Norway) NOR	Bjørn Nilsen	24	4	21	3	2+1	1
	DF	(England) ENG	Adrian Pennock	18	2	15	1	3	1
	DF	(Norway) NOR	Sindre Rekdal	26	0	22	0	4	0
	MF	(Norway) NOR	Petter Rudi	13	0	1+11	0	0+1	0
	DF	(Norway) NOR	Geir Sperre	22	0	18	0	4	0
	DF	(Norway) NOR	Trond Strande	2	1	0+1	0	0+1	1
	FW	(Norway) NOR	Ole Bjørn Sundgot	19	3	11+6	3	1+1	0
	FW	(Norway) NOR	Frode Tømmerbakk	4	0	0+3	0	1	0

=== Goalscorers ===
Rank	Position	Nat.	Player	Tippeligaen	Norwegian Cup	Total
1	FW	(Norway)	Øystein Neerland	11	4	15
2	FW	(Norway)	Petter Belsvik	8	4	12
3	FW	(Norway)	Bjørn Nilsen	3	1	4
3	FW	(Norway)	Stein Holsvik	2	2	4
5	FW	(Norway)	Ole Bjørn Sundgot	3	0	3
6	MF	(Norway)	Jan Erlend Kruse	2	0	2
6	MF	(Norway)	Øyvind Leonhardsen	2	0	2
6	DF	(England)	Adrian Pennock	1	1	2
9	MF	(Norway)	Morten Kristiansen	1	0	1
9	DF	(Norway)	Trond Strande	0	1	1
			TOTALS	33	13	46

== See also ==
- Molde FK seasons
