= 1994 Norwegian Football Cup final =

- Event: 1994 Norwegian Football Cup
Molde	Lyn
3	2
- Date: 23 October 1994
- Venue: Ullevaal Stadion, Oslo
- Referee: Terje Singsaas
- Attendance: 24,524

The 1994 Norwegian Football Cup final was the 89th final of the Norwegian Football Cup. It was played on 23 October 1994 at Ullevaal Stadion, in Oslo, Norway. The final was contested between Molde and Lyn. Molde won the game 3–2 and won their first title. This was Molde's 3rd cup final, while Lyn traveled to Ullevaal for the 13th time. The winner earned a place in the 1995–96 UEFA Cup Winners' Cup.

== Route to the final ==
Molde			Round	Lyn		
Surnadal	4–1 (A)		Round 1	Selbak	3–2 (A)	
Ørsta	8–1 (A)		Round 2	Ski	2–0 (H)	
Orkdal	2–1 (A)		Round 3	Eik-Tønsberg	2–1 (A)	
Jevnaker	4–3 (H)		Round 4	HamKam	2–0 (H)	
Tromsø	2–0 (H)		Quarterfinal	Hødd	5–3 aet (A)	
Rosenborg	2–1 (H)	2–2 (A)	Semifinal	Moss	2–0 (H)	1–2 (A)

== Match ==
=== Details ===
23 October 1994
13:15 CET (UTC+1)

Molde	3–2	Lyn
Jacobsen 12'; Sundgot 42'; Stavrum 48'	Report	Tessem 9'; Sørensen 59'

Ullevaal Stadion, Oslo
Attendance: 24,524
Referee: Terje Singsaas (Rosenborg)

Molde	Lyn

Molde:
GK	1	(Norway) Morten Bakke
RB	2	(Norway) Trond Strande
CB		(Norway) Sindre Rekdal
CB	4	(Spain) Flaco	(yellow card) 58'
LB		(Norway) Knut Anders Fostervold
CM	6	(Norway) Ulrich Møller (c)	(yellow card) 7'
CM	8	(Norway) Tarje Nordstrand Jacobsen		(substituted off) 86'
CM	10	(Norway) Kjetil Rekdal
RW	11	(Norway) Daniel Berg Hestad		(substituted off) 80'
CF	9	(Norway) Arild Stavrum
LW	7	(Norway) Ole Bjørn Sundgot
Substitutions:
MF		(Norway) Tor Gunnar Johnsen		(substituted in) 80'
MF		(Norway) André Nevstad		(substituted in) 86'
Head Coach:
(Norway) Åge Hareide

Lyn:
GK	12	(Norway) Ståle Oldeide
RB	3	(Norway) Thomas Østvold	(substituted off) 90'
CB	(Norway) Thomas Wæhler
CB	(Finland) Anders Eriksson
LB	(Norway) Sigbjørn Kolnes	(yellow card) 6'
RM	(Norway) Axel Kolle
CM	(Norway) Stein Amundsen
LM	(Norway) Sture Fladmark
RW	5	(Norway) Jan Derek Sørensen
CF	10	(Norway) Jo Tessem
LW	(Norway) Tommy Bergersen	(substituted off) 75'
Substitutions:
MF	(Norway) Tom Buer	(substituted in) 90'
MF	(Norway) Anders Rønnevig	(substituted in) 75'
Head Coach:
(Sweden) Olle Nordin

== See also ==
- 1994 Norwegian Football Cup
- 1994 Tippeligaen
- 1994 1. divisjon
