= Sundgot =

Sundgot is a Norwegian surname. Notable people with the surname include:

- Arild Sundgot (born 1978), Norwegian former football striker
- Jorunn Sundgot-Borgen (born 1961), Norwegian professor of sports medicine
- Ole Bjørn Sundgot (born 1972), Norwegian former professional footballer and manager
- Ole Sebastian Sundgot (born 2001), Norwegian footballer
- Otto Sundgot (born 1951), Norwegian former footballer
