= Tarje Nordstrand Jacobsen =

Norwegian footballer and executive (born 1974)

Personal information
- Date of birth: 5 May 1974 (age 52)
- Height: 1.82 m (6 ft 0 in)
- Position: Midfielder

Youth career
- –1991: Molde

Senior career*
| Years | Team | Apps | (Gls) |
| 1992–1995 | Molde | 39 | (0) |
| 1996–1997 | Hødd | | |
| 1998–2001 | Haugesund | 102 | (11) |
| 2002–2005 | Løv-Ham | | |
| 2005 | → Notodden (loan) | | |
| 2006 | Molde 2 | | |

International career
| 1992 | Norway U18 | 5 | (0) |
| 1993 | Norway U20 | 5 | (0) |
| 1994 | Norway U21 | 2 | (0) |
- * Club domestic league appearances and goals

Tarje Nordstrand Jacobsen (born 5 May 1974) is a Norwegian former footballer who played as a midfielder. He is best known as a player and managing director of Molde FK, also playing in the Eliteserien for FK Haugesund and the First Division for Haugesund, Hødd and Løv-Ham.

== Club career ==
He played for Molde FK in his youth years. On 10 May 1992, Jacobsen got his senior debut for the club in Molde's 0–2 league defeat against Rosenborg at Lerkendal Stadion. In 1994, he won the Norwegian Cup with Molde, scoring Molde's first goal in the cup final which they won 3–2 over Lyn. He also helped Molde win promotion to Eliteserien, played Molde's Eliteserien campaign in 1995 in which they finished runners-up, before staying two seasons in IL Hødd. He was not satisfied with Molde's final contract draft, or what he considered to be his prospects of regular playtime.

When Jacobsen joined Hødd, the team had been relegated from the 1995 Eliteserien and invested in swift re-promotion. Jacobsen reportedly cost 220,000 kr. As the 1996 season progressed, Hødd instead faced a battle against relegation to the Second Division. Jacobsen was credited with the goals that decisively saved Hødd from relegation, as he scored twice against Strindheim in late September to secure a draw. Jacobsen played every minute of the 1996 campaign, except for one match where he was substituted off, and was the only one among Hødd's regular players to not receive any cards.

As he too had believed the team would win promotion, Jacobsen left Hødd after the 1997 season as the team had failed for second time. Jacobsen went on trial at FK Haugesund. Despite breaking a wrist during the trial, Jacobsen was signed by Haugesund on 31 December 1997, returning to Eliteserien and full-time football.

Initially, Haugesund were relegated from the 1998 Eliteserien. That year he also made his debut as a left back, covering for the usual left back Øyvind Mellemstrand, and was even "man of the match" in his new role, according to the local paper. Jacobsen lost his starting place in early 1999, but later regained it. He scored seven league goals in the 1999 1. divisjon, which ended in re-promotion. In 2001 he was more often used as a winger; Unusually for a winger, however, Jacobsen did not record a single assist during the season, rather being known for stamina and doing "legwork".

By the end of 2001, FK Haugesund faced a severe financial struggle, mandating 20% wage cuts from all the players. Jacobsen instead agreed to a severance package, becoming a free agent. Jacobsen was originally among the five players singled out for a larger pay cut, which the club had to retract. Four of these five players plus two others took the severance packages, including Jacobsen. Due to a perceived lack of respect and trust, Jacobsen had sought out a solution where he could leave Haugesund rather than continue. At the same time, he conveyed that the players had been lenient in their financial demands as to save the club from bankruptcy. He also praised the players' union NISO for steering the situation away from "unprecedented chaos". In 2004, Jacobsen became licensed as a football agent, and was contracted by NISO to oversee players' rights in football transfers.

He moved to Bergen to study at the Norwegian School of Economics, also dating the TV 2 sports anchor Guro Fostervold. Jacobsen signed for Second Division club Løv-Ham and continued his playing career there. Already after one month, Jacobsen played a friendly match for SK Brann, but remained in Løv-Ham. With this team he advanced to the First Division, winning promotion in 2004.

From July 2005 he had a loan stint at Second Division club Notodden FK. He had been called by Notodden coach Dag Eilev Fagermo who inquired about available players to bolster the squad, and Jacobsen suggested himself. In 2006, as Nordstrand Jacobsen was employed by Molde FK, he was semi-retired as a player, but featured for Molde FK 2 in the Second Division. Among others, he played in the debut match of a 15-year old Magnus Wolff Eikrem in April 2006. The next month, he was sent off in another match.

== International career ==
Tarje Nordstrand Jacobsen was capped 5 times for Norway under-19 in 1992, 5 times for Norway under-20 in 1993, and 2 times for Norway under-21 in 1994. He was selected for the 1992 UEFA European Under-18 Championship and the 1993 FIFA World Youth Championship.

== After retirement ==
Ahead of the 2006 season, Nordstrand Jacobsen became managing director and head of the sports committee in Molde FK. This season ended in failure, as Molde ended last in the 2006 Eliteserien and were relegated. With the manager being sacked, Nordstrand Jacobsen was leading the effort to find a new manager, but backed out of negotiations with Kjetil Rekdal.

Molde later bounced back to take the club's first league championships in 2011, 2012 and 2014. Tarje Nordstrand Jacobsen left his position in December 2015. In 2019 he became chairman of the board in SK Træff.

== Personal life ==
Up to his late teenages, Jacobsen was also an alpine skier. Representing the club Molde og Omegn IF, he participated in national races, among others with Andrine Flemmen.

For some time, he studied history at Volda University College.
