= 1993 in Norwegian football =

Football in Norway
- Season: 1993

Men's football
- Tippeligaen: Rosenborg
- 1. divisjon: VIF Fotball (Group A); Sogndal (Group B)
- 2. divisjon: Jevnaker (Group 1); Åndalsnes (Group 2); Stabæk (Group 3); Vidar (Group 4); Stjørdals-Blink (Group 5); Alta (Group 6)
- Cupen: Bodø/Glimt

Women's football
- 1. divisjon: Sprint-Jeløy
- Cupen: Trondheims-Ørn

The 1993 season was the 88th season of competitive football in Norway.

== Men's football ==
=== League season ===
==== Promotion and relegation ====
League	Promoted to league	Relegated from league
Tippeligaen	Bodø/Glimt; Fyllingen	Sogndal; Mjøndalen
1. divisjon	Åsane; Åssiden; Mjølner; Nardo; Skeid; Ski	Odd; Pors; Fredrikstad; Os; Stjørdals-Blink; Haugar

==== Tippeligaen ====
Pos	Team	Pld	W	D	L	GF	GA	GD	Pts	Qualification or relegation
1	Rosenborg (C)	22	14	5	3	47	30	+17	47	Qualification for the UEFA Cup preliminary round
2	Bodø/Glimt	22	14	3	5	51	24	+27	45	Qualification for the Cup Winners' Cup qualifying round
3	Lillestrøm	22	13	3	6	47	26	+21	42	Qualification for the UEFA Cup preliminary round
4	Viking	22	13	2	7	38	27	+11	41	
5	Ham-Kam	22	10	3	9	42	39	+3	33	
6	Tromsø	22	6	8	8	25	25	0	26	
7	Brann	22	7	5	10	31	38	−7	26	
8	Kongsvinger	22	7	4	11	33	41	−8	25	
9	Start	22	6	5	11	26	29	−3	23	
10	Molde (R)	22	5	7	10	23	36	−13	22	Qualification for the relegation play-offs
11	Lyn (R)	22	6	4	12	39	53	−14	22	Relegation to First Division
12	Fyllingen (R)	22	4	5	13	21	55	−34	17	Relegation to First Division

Source: fotball.no
Rules for classification: 1) points; 2) goal difference; 3) number of goals scored.
(C) Champions; (R) Relegated

==== 1. divisjon ====
===== Group A =====
Pos	Team	Pld	W	D	L	GF	GA	GD	Pts	Promotion, qualification or relegation
1	VIF Fotball (C, P)	22	13	4	5	52	29	+23	43	Promotion to Tippeligaen
2	Strømsgodset (O, P)	22	12	3	7	43	37	+6	39	Qualification for the promotion play-offs
3	Eik-Tønsberg	22	10	6	6	42	27	+15	36	
4	Nardo	22	10	5	7	39	28	+11	35	
5	Tromsdalen	22	8	10	4	34	30	+4	34	
6	Strindheim	22	9	5	8	27	25	+2	32	
7	Mjøndalen	22	9	3	10	33	40	−7	30	
8	Skeid	22	7	8	7	32	34	−2	29	
9	Mjølner	22	8	5	9	35	38	−3	29	
10	Åssiden (R)	22	7	5	10	30	47	−17	26	Relegation to Second Division
11	Elverum (R)	22	7	1	14	28	37	−9	22	Relegation to Second Division
12	Strømmen (R)	22	3	3	16	31	54	−23	12	Relegation to Second Division

Source: nifs.no
Rules for classification: 1) points; 2) goal difference; 3) number of goals scored.
(C) Champions; (O) Play-off winners; (P) Promoted; (R) Relegated

===== Group B =====
Pos	Team	Pld	W	D	L	GF	GA	GD	Pts	Promotion, qualification or relegation
1	Sogndal (C, P)	22	14	5	3	51	24	+27	47	Promotion to Tippeligaen
2	Bryne	22	12	7	3	52	25	+27	43	Qualification for the promotion play-offs
3	Moss	22	13	2	7	53	33	+20	41	
4	Drøbak/Frogn	22	13	2	7	46	29	+17	41	
5	Bærum	22	10	4	8	40	41	−1	34	
6	Fana	22	7	7	8	34	36	−2	28	
7	Hødd	22	8	4	10	38	52	−14	28	
8	Åsane	22	7	4	11	36	49	−13	25	
9	Vard	22	5	7	10	29	34	−5	22	
10	Djerv 1919 (R)	22	5	7	10	30	39	−9	22	Relegation to Second Division
11	Ski (R)	22	6	3	13	18	35	−17	21	Relegation to Second Division
12	Aalesund (R)	22	4	4	14	28	58	−30	16	Relegation to Second Division

Source: nifs.no
Rules for classification: 1) points; 2) goal difference; 3) number of goals scored.
(C) Champions; (P) Promoted; (R) Relegated

==== 2. divisjon ====
===== Group 1 =====
Pos	Team	Pld	W	D	L	GF	GA	GD	Pts	Promotion or relegation
1	Jevnaker (P)	22	13	7	2	62	21	+41	46	Promotion to First Division
2	Fredrikstad	22	13	4	5	56	33	+23	43	
3	Råde	22	12	4	6	48	40	+8	40	
4	Nybergsund	22	11	5	6	48	31	+17	38	
5	Ullern	22	9	5	8	47	50	−3	32	
6	Grue	22	8	5	9	38	46	−8	29	
7	Sprint-Jeløy	22	8	5	9	38	51	−13	29	
8	Mercantile	22	7	7	8	28	34	−6	28	
9	Selbak	22	7	4	11	41	45	−4	25	
10	Grei (R)	22	7	3	12	34	32	+2	24	Relegation to Third Division
11	Frigg (R)	22	4	5	13	32	54	−22	17	Relegation to Third Division
12	Galterud (R)	22	3	6	13	31	66	−35	15	Relegation to Third Division

(P) Promoted; (R) Relegated

===== Group 2 =====
Pos	Team	Pld	W	D	L	GF	GA	GD	Pts	Promotion or relegation
1	Åndalsnes (Note: 3 bonus points awarded?) (P)	21	13	2	6	42	28	+14	44	Promotion to First Division
2	Sørumsand	22	12	6	4	39	28	+11	42	
3	Lørenskog	22	11	5	6	42	28	+14	38	
4	Odd	22	11	4	7	44	33	+11	37	
5	Lillestrøm 2	22	10	6	6	39	30	+9	36	
6	Ørsta	22	7	9	6	31	32	−1	30	
7	Pors	22	8	5	9	32	39	−7	29	
8	Kjelsås	22	8	3	11	38	38	0	27	
9	Volda	22	8	2	12	41	43	−2	26	
10	Eidsvold Turn (R)	22	6	5	11	31	37	−6	23	Relegation to Third Division
11	Sogndal 2 (R)	22	6	5	11	28	43	−15	23	Relegation to Third Division
12	Kolbotn (R)	22	3	4	15	20	48	−28	13	Relegation to Third Division

(P) Promoted; (R) Relegated

===== Group 3 =====
Pos	Team	Pld	W	D	L	GF	GA	GD	Pts	Promotion or relegation
1	Stabæk (P)	22	16	2	4	51	26	+25	50	Promotion to First Division
2	Sandefjord	22	15	4	3	78	21	+57	49	
3	Falk	22	12	4	6	37	36	+1	40	
4	Fram Larvik	22	10	5	7	42	33	+9	35	
5	Ørn-Horten	22	10	5	7	27	26	+1	35	
6	Brann 2	22	10	3	9	50	55	−5	33	
7	Lyn 2	22	10	2	10	34	39	−5	32	
8	Os	22	7	6	9	29	39	−10	27	
9	Runar	22	6	5	11	28	36	−8	23	
10	Florvåg (R)	22	5	5	12	32	49	−17	20	Relegation to Third Division
11	Stord (R)	22	3	6	13	27	47	−20	15	Relegation to Third Division
12	Løv-Ham (R)	22	3	3	16	28	56	−28	12	Relegation to Third Division

(P) Promoted; (R) Relegated

===== Group 4 =====
Pos	Team	Pld	W	D	L	GF	GA	GD	Pts	Promotion or relegation
1	Vidar (P)	22	18	3	1	59	18	+41	57	Promotion to First Division
2	Start 2	22	12	7	3	54	30	+24	43	
3	Flekkefjord	22	11	6	5	50	37	+13	39	
4	Ålgård	22	10	6	6	44	33	+11	36	
5	Klepp	22	9	4	9	45	40	+5	31	
6	Viking 2	22	7	8	7	43	35	+8	29	
7	Haugar (Note: Haugar merged and formed FK Haugesund from the next season.)	22	7	5	10	37	51	−14	26	
8	Ulf-Sandnes	22	7	5	10	39	57	−18	26	
9	Vedavåg	22	6	7	9	39	46	−7	25	
10	Donn (R)	22	4	7	11	30	42	−12	19	Relegation to Third Division
11	Jerv (R)	22	3	8	11	29	40	−11	17	Relegation to Third Division
12	Egersund (R)	22	3	4	15	27	67	−40	13	Relegation to Third Division

(P) Promoted; (R) Relegated

===== Group 5 =====
Pos	Team	Pld	W	D	L	GF	GA	GD	Pts	Promotion or relegation
1	Stjørdals-Blink (P)	22	15	4	3	66	19	+47	49	Promotion to First Division
2	Kolstad	22	14	3	5	55	37	+18	45	
3	Steinkjer	22	13	4	5	59	44	+15	43	
4	Byåsen	22	11	6	5	53	38	+15	39	
5	Rosenborg 2	22	11	5	6	46	27	+19	38	
6	Melhus	22	8	6	8	35	36	−1	30	
7	Sunndal	22	7	8	7	37	39	−2	29	
8	Orkdal	22	8	4	10	49	40	+9	28	
9	Namsos	22	8	2	12	42	54	−12	26	
10	Surnadal (R)	22	6	2	14	30	55	−25	20	Relegation to Third Division
11	Averøykameratene (R)	22	3	5	14	22	52	−30	14	Relegation to Third Division
12	Nessegutten (R)	22	2	3	17	27	80	−53	9	Relegation to Third Division

(P) Promoted; (R) Relegated

===== Group 6 =====
Pos	Team	Pld	W	D	L	GF	GA	GD	Pts	Promotion or relegation
1	Alta (P)	22	12	8	2	57	28	+29	44	Promotion to First Division
2	Grovfjord	22	14	2	6	46	31	+15	44	
3	Gevir Bodø	22	12	4	6	64	41	+23	40	
4	Harstad	101	12	2	87	41	27	+14	38	
5	Sortland	22	9	7	6	49	37	+12	34	
6	Skarp	22	10	2	10	38	40	−2	32	
7	Lyngen/Karnes	22	9	4	9	37	38	−1	31	
8	Stålkameratene	22	8	4	10	43	52	−9	28	
9	Tromsø 2	22	7	5	10	58	42	+16	26	
10	Fauske/Sprint (R)	22	8	1	13	40	57	−17	25	Relegation to Third Division
11	Honningsvåg (R)	22	6	6	10	30	48	−18	24	Relegation to Third Division
12	Polarstjernen (R)	22	2	1	19	16	78	−62	7	Relegation to Third Division

(P) Promoted; (R) Relegated

=== Norwegian Cup ===
==== Final ====
24 October 1993
13:15 CET (UTC+1)

Bodø/Glimt	2–0	Strømsgodset
Johnsen 65'; Staurvik 82'	Report

Ullevaal Stadion, Oslo
Attendance: 26,315
Referee: Sven Kjellbrott (Haugerud)

== Women's football ==
=== League season ===
==== 1. divisjon ====
Pos	Team	Pld	W	D	L	GF	GA	GD	Pts	Relegation
1	Sprint/Jeløy (C)	18	15	2	1	69	22	+47	47	
2	Trondheims-Ørn	18	12	2	4	78	22	+56	38	
3	Asker	18	11	1	6	41	27	+14	34	
4	Donn	18	10	2	6	37	40	−3	32	
5	Sandviken	18	10	1	7	41	31	+10	31	
6	Setskog/Høland	18	7	2	9	36	36	0	23	
7	Klepp	18	6	1	11	28	55	−27	19	
8	Fløya	18	6	0	12	15	33	−18	18	
9	Grand Bodø (R)	18	4	4	10	23	52	−29	16	Relegation to Second Division
10	Jardar (R)	18	1	1	16	13	63	−50	4	Relegation to Second Division

(C) Champions; (R) Relegated

=== Norwegian Women's Cup ===
==== Final ====
- Trondheims-Ørn 3–2 Asker

== UEFA competitions ==
=== UEFA Champions League ===
==== Preliminary round ====
Team 1	Agg.	Team 2	1st leg	2nd leg
Avenir Beggen (Luxembourg)	0–3	(Norway) Rosenborg	0–2	0–1

==== First round ====
Team 1	Agg.	Team 2	1st leg	2nd leg
Rosenborg (Norway)	4–5	Austria Wien	3–1	1–4

=== European Cup Winners' Cup ===
==== Qualifying round ====
Team 1	Agg.	Team 2	1st leg	2nd leg
Nikol Tallinn (Estonia)	1–8	(Norway) Lillestrøm	0–4	1–4

==== First round ====
Team 1	Agg.	Team 2	1st leg	2nd leg
Lillestrøm (Norway)	2–3	(Italy) Torino	0–2	2–1

=== UEFA Cup ===
==== First round ====
Team 1	Agg.	Team 2	1st leg	2nd leg
Östers IF (Sweden)	2–7	(Norway) Kongsvinger	1–3	1–4

==== Second round ====
Team 1	Agg.	Team 2	1st leg	2nd leg
Kongsvinger (Norway)	1–3	(Italy) Juventus	1–1	0–2

== National teams ==
=== Norway men's national football team ===
==== Results ====
10 February 1993 Friendly	Portugal	1–1	Norway	Faro, Portugal
CET (UTC+1)	Oceano 56'	Report	Sørloth 87'	Stadium: Estádio de São Luís; Attendance: 6,000; Referee: Antonio Martín Navarrete (Spain)
