= Flaco =

Flaco may refer to:

- Flaco (owl), an owl that escaped Central Park Zoo in New York City
- Flaco (athlete), a Spanish soccer player
- Flaco Jiménez, an American singer
- José Manuel López (footballer), Argentine footballer nicknamed Flaco López
