= Petter Rudi =

Norwegian footballer (born 1973)

Personal information
- Full name: Petter Normann Rudi
- Date of birth: 17 September 1973 (age 53)
- Place of birth: Kristiansund, Norway
- Position: Midfielder

Senior career*
Years	Team	Apps	(Gls)
1991–1997	Molde	138	(8)
1996	→Gent (loan)	6	(0)
1997	→Perugia (loan)	14	(1)
1997–2000	Sheffield Wednesday	77	(8)
2000–2001	Molde	15	(2)
2001–2002	Lokeren	13	(2)
2002–2003	Germinal Beerschot	13	(0)
2003–2004	Austria Wien	4	(0)
2004–2006	Molde	68	(7)
2006–2007	Gent	12	(3)
Total		360	(31)

International career
1991	Norway U17	9	(2)
1992	Norway U18	5	(0)
1993	Norway U20	3	(0)
1992–1995	Norway U21	35	(7)
1995–2006	Norway	46	(3)
- * Club domestic league appearances and goals

Petter Normann Rudi (born 17 September 1973) is a Norwegian former professional footballer who played as a midfielder.

He notably played in the Premier League for Sheffield Wednesday and in Serie A for Perugia. He also played for Molde, Gent, Lokeren, Germinal Beerschot and Austria Wien. He was capped 46 times by Norway, scoring 3 goals.

== Club career ==
As midfielder, Rudi has played with several European clubs. These are Gent, Perugia, Sheffield Wednesday, Lokeren, Germinal Beerschot, Austria Wien and Molde.

=== Molde ===
At 17 years old, Rudi became part of Molde's senior squad in the 1991 season. He got his debut on 12 May 1991 in a league game the club drew 1–1 against Fyllingen. Rudi scored his first goals for Molde on 16 August 1992, when he scored a brace against Mjøndalen in Molde's 4–0 win at Nedre Eiker Stadion. Molde were relegated from the top division in 1993, but Rudi played all games in the following season and contributed to Molde being promoted back to Tippeligaen. Rudi was suspended in the final of the 1994 Norwegian Cup where Molde defeated Lyn 3–2 and won the club's first major trophy.

=== Sheffield Wednesday ===
Rudi was signed by David Pleat in October 1997 from Molde. He made his debut against Spurs, and his style of play made him popular with the Wednesday fans. Rudi became a regular starter under Ron Atkinson later that season after Pleat was sacked. The Norwegian failed to score in his first season, he did however score in the 5–3 penalty shoot-out victory against Watford in the third round of the FA Cup.

Rudi made 79 and six sub appearances for Wednesday, scoring eight goals.

== International career ==
Rudi played a total of 52 games and scored nine goals for Norway at international youth level.

During his career, Rudi was capped 46 times for Norway, and scored three goals, perhaps most notably the opening goal of Norway's 4–2 win against Brazil in 1997.

== Career statistics ==
=== Club ===
Club	Season	Division	League		Cup (Note: Includes the Norwegian Cup, Coppa Italia and FA Cup)		League Cup		Europe		Other (Note: All appearances in relegation play-offs)		Total	
Club	Season	Division	Apps	Goals	Apps	Goals	Apps	Goals	Apps	Goals	Apps	Goals	Apps	Goals
Molde	1991	Tippeligaen	12	0	1	0	—		—		—		13	0
Molde	1992	Tippeligaen	20	2	2	0	—		—		—		22	2
Molde	1993	Tippeligaen	22	2	5	2	—		—		2	0	29	4
Molde	1994	1. divisjon (2)	22	2	4	1	—		—		—		26	3
Molde	1995	Tippeligaen	25	1	2	0	—		4 (Note: Appearances in UEFA Cup Winners' Cup)	0	—		31	1
Molde	1996	Tippeligaen	26	0	4	0	—		2 (Note: Appearances in UEFA Cup qualifying round)	0	—		32	0
Molde	1997	Tippeligaen	11	1	0	0	—		—		—		11	1
Molde	Total		138	8	18	3	—	—	6	0	2	0	164	11
Perugia (loan)	1996–97	Serie A	14	1	0	0	—		—		—		14	1
Sheffield Wednesday	1997–98	Premier League	22	0	0	0	0	0	—		—		22	0
Sheffield Wednesday	1998–99	Premier League	34	6	3	1	1	0	—		—		40	7
Sheffield Wednesday	1999–2000	Premier League	20	2	1	0	4	1	—		—		25	3
Sheffield Wednesday	2000–01	First Division	1	0	0	0	0	0	—		—		1	0
Sheffield Wednesday	Total		77	8	4	1	5	1	—	—	—	—	86	10
Molde	2000	Tippeligaen	3	0	1	1	—		2 (Note: Appearances in UEFA Cup)	0	—		6	1
Molde	2001	Tippeligaen	12	2	1	0	—		—		—		13	2
Molde	Total		15	2	2	1	—	—	2	0	—	—	19	3
Molde	2004	Tippeligaen	26	3	3	1	—		—		—		29	4
Molde	2005	Tippeligaen	16	3	3	0	—		—		2	0	21	3
Molde	2006	Tippeligaen	26	1	1	0	—		4	0	—		31	1
Molde	Total		68	7	7	1	—	—	4	0	2	0	81	8
Molde Total			221	17	27	5	—	—	12	0	4	0	264	22

=== International ===
National team	Year	Apps	Goals
Norway	1995	2	0
Norway	1996	5	0
Norway	1997	8	3
Norway	1998	5	0
Norway	1999	7	0
Norway	2000	0	0
Norway	2001	6	0
Norway	2002	0	0
Norway	2003	3	0
Norway	2004	2	0
Norway	2005	5	0
Norway	2006	3	0
Norway	Total	46	3

== Honours ==
Molde

- Norwegian Cup: 1994, 2005

Austria Wien

- Austrian Football Bundesliga: 2003–04

== Post-playing career ==
Petter Rudi retired from football in 2007 after his contract with Gent was not renewed. He has since worked many years for Molde as a scout and analyst.

On 29 March 2026, it was announced that Petter Rudi has been diagnosed with amyotrophic lateral sclerosis (ALS), also known as motor neuron disease.
