= Otto Sundgot =

Norwegian footballer (born 1951)

Personal information
- Full name: Otto Sundgot
- Date of birth: 23 February 1951 (age 75)
- Place of birth: Norway
- Position: Midfielder

Senior career*
Years	Team	Apps	(Gls)
1968–1974	Hødd		
1975–1976	Viking	29	(1)
1977–1988	Hødd		

International career
	Norway U18	6	(0)
	Norway U21	1	(0)
- * Club domestic league appearances and goals

Otto Sundgot (born 23 February 1951) is a Norwegian former footballer.

Sundgot played for Hødd most of his career and scored 183 goal in 668 matches for the club. He is the second-most capped player at Hødd, only beaten by André Nevstad. Sundgot was in 2012 voted the third best player in the history of Hødd, behind Kjetil Hasund and Nevstad. Sundgot had a spell at Viking between 1975 and 1976, where he played 29 matches and scored 1 goal in the league, and played as a centre-back when Viking won the league in 1975.

Sundgot was not capped at senior level, but played six matches for the Norwegian U18 team, and one match for the under-21 team.

He is the father of the footballers Ole Bjørn Sundgot and Arild Sundgot.
