= Ståle Oldeide =

Norwegian footballer (born 1966)

Personal information
- Date of birth: 25 December 1966 (age 59)
- Position: Goalkeeper

Youth career
- Åkra

Senior career*
Years	Team	Apps	(Gls)
–1986	Åkra		
1987–1993	Bryne		
1994–1996	Lyn	19	(1)
1996	→ Åkra (loan)		
1997–1998	Haugesund		
1998	→ Viborg (loan)		
c. 1998–2013	Åkra		
- * Club domestic league appearances and goals

Ståle Oldeide (born 25 December 1966) is a retired Norwegian football goalkeeper.

Starting his career in Åkra IL, he joined regional greats Bryne FK in 1987. Oldeide was bought by ambitious Lyn Fotball in 1994. Failing to secure promotion to Eliteserien, he did however score a penalty in 1994. In 1996 he went on loan to Åkra, and from there to FK Haugesund as the newly promoted first-tier team's reserve goalkeeper in 1997. In 1998 he did not play, but spent time on loan in Viborg FF in the spring. After that he spent about fifteen years on the books of Åkra.

Oldeide was a substitute for the 1987 Norwegian Football Cup Final, which Bryne won, and played the 1994 Norwegian Football Cup Final, which Lyn lost.
