= Egil Ulfstein =

Norwegian footballer (born 1971)

Personal information
- Date of birth: 1 October 1971 (age 55)
- Place of birth: Ulsteinvik, Norway
- Height: 1.88 m (6 ft 2 in)
- Position: Defender

Senior career*
Years	Team	Apps	(Gls)
1988–1992	Hødd		
1993–1997	Viking		
1998–2004	Brann		

International career
1990	Norway u-19	2	(0)
1992–1993	Norway u-21	19	(2)
1995	Norway	2	(0)
- * Club domestic league appearances and goals

Egil Ulfstein (born 1 October 1971) is a retired Norwegian football defender.

A son of IL Hødd legend Jan Ulfstein, Egil Ulfstein played for Hødd himself and represented Norway on u-21 level. Ahead of the 1993 season he was bought by Viking, moving to Brann in 1998. He was also capped twice for Norway in a 1995 tour of the Caribbean. In the 2004 season he only featured in a single match, a cup thrashing of Hødd. Brann and Ulfstein went on to become cup champions, but Ulfstein retired after the season.
