= André Nevstad =

Norwegian footballer (born 1972)

Personal information
- Full name: André Leif Nevstad
- Date of birth: 12 May 1972 (age 54)
- Place of birth: Norway
- Position: Midfielder

Youth career
- Hødd

Senior career*
Years	Team	Apps	(Gls)
1988–1992	Hødd		
1993–1994	Molde	28	(3)
1995–2008	Hødd		

International career
1992–1993	Norway U21	3	(0)

Managerial career
- 2016–2019: Hødd (director of sports)
- 2020–: Mjøndalen (managing director)
- * Club domestic league appearances and goals

André Leif Nevstad (born 12 May 1972) is a retired Norwegian football midfielder.

He came through the youth ranks of Hødd, where he stayed his entire career, except for the seasons 1993 and 1994 in rivals Molde FK. At Molde, he became Norwegian Cup champion in 1994, appearing as an 86th minute substitute in the 1994 Norwegian Football Cup Final. He was capped for Norway at under-21 level. Most of all, he became a club legend in Hødd, recording a total of 683 matches across all competitions.

Nevstad was hired in the IL Hødd administration in 1996, and worked there continuously until 2019, when he resigned as director of sports. He is married and has three children one named Vetle. In 2020 he replaced Kenneth W. Karlsen as managing director of Mjøndalen IF.
