= Rekdal =

Surname list

Rekdal is a surname and a location in Møre og Romsdal, Norway. Notable people with the surname include:

- Anders Rekdal (born 1987), Norwegian freestyle skier
- Kjetil Rekdal (born 1968), Norwegian footballer
- Paisley Rekdal, American poet
- Sindre Rekdal (born 1970), Norwegian football player
