= Pål Håpnes =

Norwegian footballer and manager (born 1970)

Personal information
- Date of birth: 28 June 1970 (age 56)
- Position: Midfielder

Youth career
- Lunner

Senior career*
Years	Team	Apps	(Gls)
- Lunner
–1992	Gran		
1993–1999	Kongsvinger	106	(7)
1998	→ Moss (loan)	3	(0)
2000–2002	Bryne		
2002–2003	Kongsvinger	20	(6)
2004	Vinger		

Managerial career
- –2014: Kongsvinger (junior)
- 2008: Kongsvinger (assistant)
- 2015–2018: Kongsvinger (women)
- * Club domestic league appearances and goals

Pål Håpnes (born 28 June 1970) is a retired Norwegian football midfielder and later manager.

He went from Lunner to Gran before playing over 100 first-tier league games for Kongsvinger. In 1998 he was loaned to Moss. After two and a half seasons in Bryne from 2000 to 2002 he returned to Kongsvinger in the summer of 2002, now residing on the third tier. In 2004 he played briefly for lowly Vinger FK before retiring, and was hired at the Norwegian School of Elite Sport in Kongsvinger and Kongsvinger's junior team. In the autumn of 2008 he doubled as the senior team's assistant coach. From 2015 through 2018 he coached Kongsvinger's women's team.
