= Trond Strande =

Norwegian footballer and coach (born 1970)

Personal information
- Date of birth: 24 November 1970 (age 55)
- Place of birth: Molde, Norway
- Height: 1.78 m (5 ft 10 in)
- Position: Defender

Team information
- Current team: Molde (assistant coach)

Youth career
- –1986: Elnesvågen IL
- 1987: Fræna FK
- 1988–1990: Molde FK

Senior career*
Years	Team	Apps	(Gls)
1991–2007	Molde FK	275	(9)
- * Club domestic league appearances and goals

Trond Strande (born 24 November 1970) is a Norwegian football coach and former player who is assistant coach in Eliteserien club Molde. He spent his entire career playing for Molde FK and was a regular on Molde's team from 1991 to 2007.

== Club career ==
Strande was born in Molde, and grew up in Elnesvågen. As a youngster, Strande started to play football for Elnesvågen IL, and made his debut for the first-team at the age of 15. In 1987, he played for Fræna FK, where he was a regular on both the youth-team and the first-team. Strande joined the youth-team of Molde FK the next season.

Trond Strande was taken up in Molde's senior squad in 1990, and he made his debut on 28 April 1991 against Lyn, when he came on as a substitute in the 86th minute. This match was the opening match of the 1991 season, and also the match Morten Bakke made his debut for Molde.

The highlights of his career is the two cup championships in 1994 and 2005, and Molde's participation in the Champions League in 1999, from which he is remembered for several eminent dribble raid up the right side. Strande is also well remembered for his stoppage-time equalizing free-kick goal against local rivals Aalesund on 18 October 2003.

In December 2005, Strande stated that he was ready to take over as Molde's head coach after Bo Johansson, if the club management asked for it. But Molde appointed Arild Stavrum as new coach before the 2006 season and Strande continued as a player until he retired after helping Molde gain promotion to Tippeligaen in the 2007 season.

Trond Strande played a total of 238 matches in Tippeligaen, and 520 matches in total. Alongside Vegard Forren and Mattias Moström, he is the only player to have appearances for Molde in 12 consecutive top division seasons.

== Coaching career ==
After his retirement, he has worked at Akerakademiet (Molde FK's youth academy) and been coach for Molde's U17-team.

In 2015, he became assistant coach for Molde's first team.

== Career statistics ==
Season	Club	Division	League		Cup		Europe		Other (Note: Includes other competitive matches, including Promotion/relegation play-offs)		Total	
Season	Club	Division	Apps	Goals	Apps	Goals	Apps	Goals	Apps	Goals	Apps	Goals
1991	Molde	Tippeligaen	1	0	1	1	—		—		2	1
1992	Molde	Tippeligaen	17	0	≥1	0	—		—		18	0
1993	Molde	Tippeligaen	16	1	3	1	—		2 (Note: Two appearances and one goal in Tippeligaen Relegation play-offs)	1	21	3
1994	Molde	1. divisjon	19	0	4	0	—		—		23	0
1995	Molde	Tippeligaen	17	0	≥1	0	0	0	—		18	0
1996	Molde	Tippeligaen	17	0	3	0	2 (Note: Appearances in the UEFA Cup Winners' Cup)	0	—		22	0
1997	Molde	Tippeligaen	23	0	2	0	—		—		25	0
1998	Molde	Tippeligaen	2	0	0	0	0	0	—		2	0
1999	Molde	Tippeligaen	21	0	6	0	8 (Note: Five appearances in Champions League group stage and three appearances in Champions League qualifying rounds)	0	—		35	0
2000	Molde	Tippeligaen	16	0	2	0	1 (Note: Appearance(s) in the UEFA Cup, including qualifying rounds)	0	—		19	0
2001	Molde	Tippeligaen	19	2	3	0	—		—		22	2
2002	Molde	Tippeligaen	22	1	2	0	—		—		24	1
2003	Molde	Tippeligaen	17	2	1	0	5	0	—		23	2
2004	Molde	Tippeligaen	16	1	0	0	—		—		16	1
2005	Molde	Tippeligaen	23	1	4	0	—		0	0	27	1
2006	Molde	Tippeligaen	11	1	0	0	2	0	—		13	1
2007	Molde	1. divisjon	18	0	0	0	—		—		18	0
Career Total			275	9	≥33	2	18	0	2	1	328	12

== Honours ==
- Norwegian Cup: 1994, 2005
- 1. divisjon: 2007

== See also ==
- List of one-club men
