= Thomas Wæhler =

Norwegian footballer (born 1973)

Thomas Wæhler (born 28 July 1973) is a Norwegian football defender who last played for Norwegian team Skeid. He has played professionally with Lyn and Strømsgodset IF, including stints in the Norwegian Premier League in 1992–1993 and 1997–2001.

He is married to retired international footballer Kristine Edner.
