= Tor Gunnar Johnsen =

Norwegian footballer (born 1971)

Personal information
- Date of birth: October 13, 1971 (age 55)
- Place of birth: Trondheim, Norway
- Height: 1.88 m (6 ft 2 in)
- Position: Forward

Youth career
- Nardo FK
- Rosenborg BK

Senior career*
| Years | Team | Apps | (Gls) |
| 1993 | Rosenborg BK | 5 | (2) |
| 1994–1995 | Molde FK | 19 | (1) |
| 1996–1997 | Kongsvinger IL | 17 | (1) |
| 1998–2002 | Odd Grenland | 59 | (9) |
- * Club domestic league appearances and goals as of 24 May 2009

Tor Gunnar Johnsen is a retired Norwegian football forward. He is the father of Dennis Tørset Johnsen and Mikael Tørset Johnsen.
