= Stein Amundsen =

Norwegian footballer (born 1966)

Personal information
- Full name: Stein Røssevold Amundsen
- Date of birth: 9 February 1966 (age 60)
- Position: Forward

Youth career
- –1988: Lillestrøm

Senior career*
Years	Team	Apps	(Gls)
–1987	Drøbak-Frogn		
1988–1991	Lillestrøm	66	(17)
1992–1997	Lyn	107	(28)

International career
1986–1989	Norway u-21	9	(1)
- * Club domestic league appearances and goals

Stein Amundsen (born 9 February 1966) is a Norwegian former football striker.

== Career ==
He started his career in Drøbak-Frogn and was picked up by Lillestrøm SK in 1988. His career was crowned with the 1989 1. divisjon title, which he secured with the decisive winning goal. He amassed 66 league games over four seasons. He was bought by Lyn in 1992, eventually being converted to midfielder as well as team captain. He played the 1994 Norwegian Football Cup Final, which Lyn lost.

Upon retiring in 1997, he entered dentist training and eventually settled as a dentist in Hvitsten. He married and had one daughter.
