= Flaco (athlete) =

Spanish footballer and coach

Personal information
- Full name: Jose Maria Avizanda Glaria
- Date of birth: 24 May 1966 (age 60)
- Place of birth: Pamplona, Spain
- Height: 1.90 m (6 ft 3 in)
- Position: Defender

Senior career*
Years	Team	Apps	(Gls)
1985–1986	Deportivo Aragón	?	(?)
1986–1990	Rayo Vallecano	72	(2)
1992–1996	Molde	?	(?)

Managerial career
- Averøykameratene
- Bryn
- * Club domestic league appearances and goals

José María Avizanda Glaría (Note: In this Spanish name, the first or paternal surname is Avizanda and the second or maternal family name is Glaría.) (born 24 May 1966), better known as Flaco, is a Spanish football coach and former player. He won the Norwegian Football Cup with Molde in 1994. Flaco has played for Rayo Vallecano from 1986 to 1990, where he was a teammate of Jan Berg. When he left Rayo Vallecano for Molde, he became the first and for many years the only Spaniard to have played in the Norwegian Premier League. During his coaching career he has coached Averøykameratene and Bryn from Møre og Romsdal. After 17 years in Norway, he now lives in Spain.

== Career statistics ==
Club	Season	Division	League		Cup		Total	
Club	Season	Division	Apps	Goals	Apps	Goals	Apps	Goals
1986–87	Rayo Vallecano	Segunda División	6	0	?	?	6	0
1987–88	Rayo Vallecano	Segunda División	20	1	?	?	20	1
1988–89	Rayo Vallecano	Segunda División	35	1	?	?	35	1
1989-90	Rayo Vallecano	La Liga	11	0	?	?	11	0
Rayo Vallecano Total			72	2	?	?	72	2

Source: Bdfutbol.com
