= 1994 Norwegian First Division =

Season of the Norwegian soccer championships

1. divisjon
- Season: 1994
- Champions: Strindheim; Hødd
- Promoted: Strindheim; Stabæk; Hødd; Molde
- Relegated: Stjørdals/Blink; Bærum; Vidar; Mjøndalen
- Cup Winners' Cup: Molde
- Matches played: 264
- Goals scored: 875 (3.31 per match)
- Top goalscorer: Arild Stavrum (19 goals)

The 1994 1. divisjon, Norway's second-tier football league, began play on 1 May 1994 and ended on 2 October 1994. The league was contested by 24 teams, divided in two groups. Due to an expansion from 12 to 14 teams in Tippeligaen, the top two teams of each group won promotion to Tippeligaen and the bottom two teams were relegated to the 2. divisjon. This was the first season the two groups were named with numbers instead of letters.

Strindheim, Hødd, Stabæk and Molde won promotion to Tippeligaen, while Stjørdals/Blink, Bærum, Vidar, Mjøndalen was relegated to the 2. divisjon.

== Tables ==
=== Group 1 ===
Pos	Team	Pld	W	D	L	GF	GA	GD	Pts	Promotion, qualification or relegation
1	Strindheim (C, P)	22	14	4	4	59	23	+36	46	Promotion to Tippeligaen
2	Stabæk (P)	22	13	3	6	43	32	+11	42	Promotion to Tippeligaen
3	Drøbak/Frogn	22	11	5	6	39	25	+14	38	
4	Nardo	22	11	5	6	32	33	−1	38	
5	Lyn	22	10	4	8	35	24	+11	34	
6	Skeid	22	9	5	8	55	45	+10	32	
7	Moss	22	8	5	9	40	38	+2	29	
8	Alta	22	8	3	11	31	37	−6	27	
9	Tromsdalen	22	8	2	12	41	49	−8	26	
10	Mjølner	22	7	5	10	32	43	−11	26	
11	Stjørdals-Blink (R)	22	6	4	12	31	45	−14	22	Relegation to Second Division
12	Bærum (R)	22	4	1	17	22	61	−39	13	Relegation to Second Division

Source: fotball.no
Rules for classification: 1) points; 2) goal difference; 3) number of goals scored.
(C) Champions; (P) Promoted; (R) Relegated

=== Group 2 ===
Pos	Team	Pld	W	D	L	GF	GA	GD	Pts	Promotion, qualification or relegation
1	Hødd (C, P)	22	14	4	4	52	22	+30	46	Promotion to Tippeligaen
2	Molde (P)	22	13	3	6	44	25	+19	42	Cup Winners' Cup qualifying and promotion to Tippeligaen (Note: Molde qualified for the Cup Winners' Cup as Norwegian Cup winners.)
3	Fyllingen	22	12	5	5	45	25	+20	41	
4	Eik-Tønsberg	22	10	5	7	40	30	+10	35	
5	Bryne	22	8	6	8	36	36	0	30	
6	Fana	22	8	6	8	30	34	−4	30	
7	Jevnaker	22	9	2	11	41	42	−1	29	
8	Åsane	22	8	4	10	34	48	−14	28	
9	Vard Haugesund	22	8	3	11	19	25	−6	27	
10	Åndalsnes	22	7	4	11	26	36	−10	25	
11	Vidar (R)	22	5	5	12	24	46	−22	20	Relegation to Second Division
12	Mjøndalen (R)	22	4	5	13	24	46	−22	17	Relegation to Second Division

Source: fotball.no
Rules for classification: 1) points; 2) goal difference; 3) number of goals scored.
(C) Champions; (P) Promoted; (R) Relegated

== Top goalscorers ==
- 19 goals:

Arild Stavrum, Molde

- 17 goals:

Anders Michelsen, Drøbak/Frogn

- 13 goals:

Kent Bergset, Fyllingen
Jan Petter Olsen, Skeid

- 12 goals:

Atle H. Markussen, Eik
Fredrik Gärdeman, Stabæk

- 11 goals:

Tommy Sylte, Hødd
Per Joar Hansen, Stjørdals-Blink
Terje Ellingsen, Mjølner

== See also ==
- 1994 Tippeligaen
- 1994 2. divisjon
- 1994 3. divisjon
