= IL Averøykameratene =

Norwegian football club

- Full name: Idrettslaget Averøykameratene
- Founded: 1951
- Ground: Bruhagen stadion, Bruhagen
- Manager: (Faroe Islands) Kurt Mørkøre
- League: Third Division
- 2011: Third Division / 9, 11th
Home colours

Idrettslaget Averøykameratene is a Norwegian association football club from Averøy Municipality, Møre og Romsdal.

The men's football team currently plays in the Third Division, the fourth tier of Norwegian football. It had a stint in the Norwegian Second Division before being relegated after the 1999 season. In 2002 they won their Third Division group, and in the two-leg playoff they beat Bergsøy IL 6–1 on aggregate. They were relegated from the 2003 Norwegian Second Division. In 2006 they prevailed again, beating Skarbøvik IF 5–4 on aggregate, but they were relegated from the 2007 Norwegian Second Division.
