= 1995 Tippeligaen =

51st season of top-tier football league in Norway

Tippeligaen
- Season: 1995
- Dates: 21 April – 22 October
- Champions: Rosenborg; 10th title
- Relegated: Hødd; Strindheim; Ham Kam
- Champions League: Rosenborg
- UEFA Cup: Molde; Bodø/Glimt
- Cup Winners' Cup: Brann
- Intertoto Cup: Lillestrøm
- Matches: 182
- Goals: 689 (3.79 per match)
- Top goalscorer: Harald Martin Brattbakk (26 goals)
- Biggest home win: Rosenborg 9–1 HamKam (2 September 1995)
- Biggest away win: Molde 0–7 Tromsø (2 September 1995)
- Highest scoring: VIF Fotball 9–2 Strindheim (24 September 1995)
- Highest attendance: 17,106; Rosenborg 5–2 Stabæk (16 May 1995)
- Lowest attendance: 600; Strindheim 1–5 Hødd (22 October 1995)
- Average attendance: 5,013 ▼11.0%

The 1995 Tippeligaen was the 51st completed season of top division football in Norway. Each team played 26 games with 3 points given for wins and 1 for draws. Number twelve, thirteen and fourteen are relegated. The winners of the two groups of the first division were promoted, as well as the winner of a play-off match between the two second placed teams in the two groups of the first division.

== Teams and locations ==
Note: Table lists in alphabetical order.

Team	Ap.	Location	Stadium
Bodø/Glimt	7	Bodø	Aspmyra Stadion
Brann	39	Bergen	Brann Stadion
HamKam	18	Hamar	Briskeby
Hødd	6	Ulsteinvik	Høddvoll Stadion
Kongsvinger	13	Kongsvinger	Gjemselund Stadion
Lillestrøm	32	Lillestrøm	Åråsen Stadion
Molde	20	Molde	Molde Stadion
Rosenborg	32	Trondheim	Lerkendal Stadion
Stabæk	1	Bærum	Nadderud Stadion
Start	27	Kristiansand	Kristiansand Stadion
Strindheim	2	Trondheim	Lerkendal Stadion
Tromsø	10	Tromsø	Alfheim Stadion
VIF Fotball	37	Oslo	Ullevaal Stadion
Viking	46	Stavanger	Stavanger Stadion

== League table ==
Pos	Team	Pld	W	D	L	GF	GA	GD	Pts	Qualification or relegation
1	Rosenborg (C)	26	19	5	2	78	29	+49	62	Qualification for the Champions League second qualifying round
2	Molde	26	14	5	7	60	47	+13	47	Qualification for the UEFA Cup qualifying round
3	Bodø/Glimt	26	12	7	7	65	43	+22	43	Qualification for the UEFA Cup qualifying round
4	Lillestrøm	26	11	8	7	50	36	+14	41	Qualification for the Intertoto Cup group stage
5	Viking	26	12	4	10	55	42	+13	40	
6	Tromsø	26	11	5	10	53	42	+11	38	
7	VIF Fotball	26	11	6	9	47	44	+3	37 (Note: VIF Fotball were deducted two points due to financial issues.)	
8	Start	26	11	1	14	51	52	−1	34	
9	Stabæk	26	9	6	11	36	40	−4	33	
10	Brann	26	9	5	12	40	50	−10	32	Qualification for the Cup Winners' Cup qualifying round
11	Kongsvinger	26	7	8	11	37	54	−17	29	
12	Hødd (R)	26	8	4	14	38	57	−19	28	Relegation to First Division
13	Ham-Kam (R)	26	8	3	15	33	66	−33	27	Relegation to First Division
14	Strindheim (R)	26	4	5	17	36	77	−41	17	Relegation to First Division

Source: fotball.no
Rules for classification: 1) points; 2) goal difference; 3) number of goals scored.
(C) Champions; (R) Relegated

== Promotion play-offs ==
- Strømsgodset won the play-offs against Sogndal, 3–1 on aggregate.
8 October 1995
15:00 CEST (UTC+2)

Strømsgodset	3–1	Sogndal
Isaksen 16', 39'; Karlsen 43'	Report	Flo 88'

Marienlyst Stadion, Drammen
Attendance: 4,298
Referee: Tom Henning Øvrebø

15 October 1995
13:00 CEST (UTC+2)

Sogndal	0–0	Strømsgodset
	Report

Fosshaugane, Sogndalsfjøra
Attendance: 3,194
Referee: Tore Hollung

== Results ==
Home \ Away	BOD	BRA	HK	HØD	KON	LIL	MOL	ROS	STB	IKS	STR	TRO	VIF	VIK
Bodø/Glimt	—	3–1	5–0	4–0	2–2	3–3	3–2	1–2	0–1	1–2	3–2	1–2	2–2	6–2
Brann	4–2	—	4–1	1–2	1–1	1–1	0–6	1–1	1–0	0–4	4–1	4–2	2–1	2–1
HamKam	0–6	1–3	—	2–1	2–1	0–2	1–2	1–3	5–0	0–0	0–0	0–1	1–0	0–5
Hødd	0–0	1–0	4–1	—	3–0	0–1	2–2	1–4	1–1	2–1	1–1	2–3	3–0	0–1
Kongsvinger	1–2	1–0	4–1	2–1	—	1–3	0–2	1–1	0–0	2–0	5–1	1–1	2–2	3–4
Lillestrøm	1–1	1–3	2–2	6–0	3–1	—	0–1	1–3	2–2	3–1	3–0	5–4	1–3	4–1
Molde	0–3	4–2	3–2	7–2	3–1	1–2	—	2–2	1–0	2–1	4–1	0–7	0–1	5–4
Rosenborg	3–3	3–1	9–1	6–1	6–0	2–1	2–0	—	5–2	4–1	2–1	2–0	3–2	1–0
Stabæk	4–0	3–0	3–1	3–1	0–0	0–2	3–1	2–1	—	1–3	3–0	0–2	0–2	2–0
Start	2–5	1–0	1–2	0–2	6–2	2–1	1–3	1–3	4–1	—	4–6	2–1	0–1	0–2
Strindheim	1–1	2–2	2–4	1–5	1–3	1–1	1–3	0–5	2–1	2–6	—	1–0	1–2	5–3
Tromsø	0–4	2–2	4–1	4–1	8–0	0–0	2–2	1–2	2–2	1–4	1–0	—	2–1	1–0
VIF Fotball	0–4	3–1	1–2	3–2	1–3	0–0	2–2	2–1	2–2	4–1	9–2	2–1	—	1–1
Viking	6–0	2–0	0–2	3–0	0–0	3–1	2–2	2–2	2–0	1–3	2–1	3–1	5–0	—

Source: NIFS (in Norwegian)
Legend: Blue = home team win; Yellow = draw; Red = away team win.

== Season statistics ==
=== Top scorers ===
Rank	Player	Club	Goals
1	(Norway) Harald Martin Brattbakk	Rosenborg	26
2	(Norway) Petter Belsvik	Start	22
3	(Norway) Ole Gunnar Solskjær	Molde	20
4	(Norway) Stig Johansen	Bodø/Glimt	19
5	(Norway) Tore André Flo	Tromsø	18
6	(Norway) Arild Stavrum	Molde	16

=== Attendances ===
Pos	Team	Total	High	Low	Average	Change
1	Rosenborg	133,646	17,106	4,985	10,280	−7.1%
2	Brann	110,971	14,068	6,426	8,536	−11.9%
3	Viking	103,499	12,416	6,028	7,961	−2.1%
4	VIF Fotball	84,027	11,982	3,006	6,464	+9.5%
5	Molde	64,836	12,990	2,228	4,987	n/a^{1}
6	Start	63,507	10,064	1,670	4,885	−7.5%
7	Lillestrøm	63,008	10,877	2,621	4,847	−7.9%
8	Bodø/Glimt	57,214	5,804	2,668	4,401	−3.8%
9	Tromsø	54,733	9,173	1,376	4,210	−4.1%
10	Stabæk	42,894	7,762	1,631	3,300	n/a^{1}
11	Hødd	40,998	5,366	1,974	3,154	n/a^{1}
12	Kongsvinger	34,087	3,997	1,849	2,622	−25.6%
13	HamKam	33,903	4,926	1,527	2,608	−17.5%
14	Strindheim	25,128	12,271	600	1,933	n/a^{1}
	League total	912,451	17,106	600	5,013	−11.0%

Source: nifs.no
Notes:
1: Team played last season in 1. divisjon.
