= Ulrich Møller =

Norwegian footballer (born 1962)

Personal information
- Full name: Ulrich Møller
- Date of birth: 11 December 1962 (age 63)
- Place of birth: Molde, Norway
- Position: Defender

Senior career*
Years	Team	Apps	(Gls)
1980–1994	Molde		

International career
1987	Norway	2	(0)

Managerial career
- 1991–1993: Molde
- * Club domestic league appearances and goals

Ulrich Møller (born 11 December 1962) is a Norwegian former footballer, who played his entire senior career for Molde. He played as a defender and was capped twice for Norway.

== Career ==
Møller was born in Molde, but was training with the Dutch club FC Den Haag and played youth matches for the club at the age of 16. After a half year in the Netherlands, he returned to Molde and made his senior debut for Molde in the First Division on 15 May 1980, in the home match against Start.

While Asbjørn Halvorsen is the youngest captain in a Norwegian Cup final, Møller became the youngest captain in a Norwegian Cup final at Ullevaal Stadion when Molde lost the cup final against Brann in 1982.

Møller was the captain of Molde in their three first finals, but had to wait till 1994 before he could lift the trophy. That final was his last match as a player. Møller is the player with the fifth-highest number of top division appearances for Molde, with 250 matches spanning from 1980 to 1993.

He was player-coach for Molde between 1991 and 1993, and has later worked in the club's administrative staff as marketing director among other things.

== International career ==
Ulrich Møller was capped two times for Norway in 1987. On 23 September 1987, he made his debut against Iceland in a European Championships qualifying match Norway lost 0–1 at Ullevaal Stadion. One month later, Møller got his second and last cap when Norway lost 1–3 away to East Germany on 28 October 1987.

== Honours ==
- Norwegian Cup: 1994
