= Sindre Rekdal =

Norwegian football player (born 1970)

Personal information
- Full name: Sindre Magne Rekdal
- Date of birth: 16 July 1970 (age 56)
- Position: Midfielder

Senior career*
Years	Team	Apps	(Gls)
1988–1998	Molde	123	(9)
1998–1999	Eendracht Aalst	?	(?)
1999–2000	Dender	?	(?)
2000–2002	Eendracht Aalst	?	(?)
2003	Follo	29	(1)
- * Club domestic league appearances and goals

Sindre Magne Rekdal (born 16 July 1970) is a Norwegian former football player, most notably for Molde FK.

== Career ==
=== Molde ===
Rekdal started his senior career at Molde in 1988. On 3 July 1988, he made his debut for the club as a substitute in Molde's 2–2 draw at home ground against Vålerengen. On 21 June 1992, he scored his first goal in Molde's 3–2 away win over Brann. He was in the starting lineup in the final of the 1994 Norwegian Cup where Molde won the club's first major trophy after defeating Lyn 3–2 on 23 October.

In his last season at Molde, Rekdal was removed from the first-team squad and placed in the reserve squad, allegedly to make room for younger players. His brother, Kjetil Rekdal later said that this move was a result of an earlier conflict between the club and his brother. The conflict ended when Sindre Rekdal signed for Belgian side Eendracht Aalst later in the 1998 season. Rekdal played 123 top division games and scored 9 goals during his 11 seasons at Molde.

=== Belgium and later career ===
Rekdal signed for Eendracht Aalst in 1998 and spent a total of five seasons in Belgium, including a spell at Dender. In 2003, his last year as active footballer, Rekdal played one season for third-tier side Follo.

== Personal life ==
He is the brother of football coach and former Norway international and Molde player Kjetil Rekdal.
