= Morten Bakke =

Norwegian footballer (born 1968)

Personal information
- Date of birth: 16 December 1968 (age 57)
- Place of birth: Hedalen, Norway
- Height: 1.90 m (6 ft 3 in)
- Position: Goalkeeper

Youth career
- Hedalen
- Aurdal
- Faaberg

Senior career*
| Years | Team | Apps | (Gls) |
| 1991–2001 | Molde | 260 | (0) |
| 1998 | → Wimbledon (loan) | 0 | (0) |
| 2001–2002 | Vålerenga IF | 37 | (0) |
| 2003–2004 | Raufoss IL | 8 | (0) |
| 2005 | Hønefoss BK | | |

International career
| 2000–2001 | Norway | 2 | (0) |

Managerial career
- 2009–: Hønefoss (goalkeeping coach)
- * Club domestic league appearances and goals

Morten Bakke (born 16 December 1968) is a retired Norwegian football goalkeeper.

== Club career ==
During his career, Bakke played for several clubs, most notably Molde and Vålerenga.

He scored from the penalty mark in a 1992 Norwegian Football Cup game against Stranda.

== International career ==
He made his debut for Norway in a February 2000 friendly match against Sweden and was Norway's third-choice goalkeeper at Euro 2000. Bakke earned his second and last cap in a January 2001 friendly match against South Korea.
