= Ole Bjørn Sundgot =

Norwegian footballer and manager (born 1972)

Personal information
- Date of birth: 21 March 1972 (age 54)
- Place of birth: Ulsteinvik, Norway
- Height: 6 ft 1 in (1.85 m)
- Positions: Striker; full back

Senior career*
Years	Team	Apps	(Gls)
–1990	Hødd		
1991–1996	Molde	109	(49)
1995–1996	→ Oldham Athletic (loan)	0	(0)
1996–1997	Bradford City	25	(6)
1997–2000	Molde	39	(8)
2000–2004	Lyn	116	(19)
2005	Hønefoss	14	(3)

International career
1995	Norway	1	(0)

Managerial career
- 2008–2010: Hønefoss
- 2020-: Sunndal IL
- * Club domestic league appearances and goals

Ole Bjørn Sundgot (born 21 March 1972) is a Norwegian former professional footballer who played as a striker, for Molde, Bradford City and Lyn. His brother is Arild Sundgot. Ole Bjørn Sundgot is currently the head coach of Sunndal IL in Norwegian 4th division (5th tier).

== Playing career ==
Sundgot was born in Ulsteinvik and began his career at Hødd, before he joined Molde ahead of the 1991 season where he made his breakthrough, forming a striker partnership with Arild Stavrum and Ole Gunnar Solskjær. Solskjær famously moved to Manchester United while Sundgot spent a period on loan at English club Oldham Athletic, but never played a single first-team match due to injury. He was later snapped up by Chris Kamara at Bradford City. He played up front with Swedish striker Rob Steiner. Sundgot scored six goals in his first season but just a couple of months into the 1997–98 season he moved back to Molde. From there he later moved to Lyn and Hønefoss.

He was capped once by Norway, coming on as a substitute for Jostein Flo in a 1995 friendly against Ghana.

== Managerial career ==
In 2008, he was hired as manager of Hønefoss, his last club as a player.

== Personal life ==
Sundgot comes from a family of footballers, and is the son of former Hødd and Viking player Otto Sundgot and the brother of the former Lillestrøm player Arild Sundgot.
