= 1956–59 Nordic Football Championship =

Tournament details
- Host countries: Denmark; Finland; Norway; Sweden
- Dates: 10 June 1956 – 18 October 1959
- Teams: 4

Final positions
- Champions: Sweden (5th title)
- Runners-up: Norway
- Third place: Denmark
- Fourth place: Finland

Tournament statistics
- Matches played: 24
- Goals scored: 110 (4.58 per match)
- Top scorer(s): (Sweden) Agne Simonsson (7 goals)

The 1956–59 Nordic Football Championship was the seventh tournament staged. Four Nordic countries participated: Denmark, Finland, Norway and Sweden. Sweden won the tournament, its fifth Nordic Championship win.

== Results ==
=== 1956 ===
10 June 1956
14:00 (UTC+2:00)

| Finland | 1-3 | Sweden |
|---|---|---|
| Lahtinen 20' | Report | Ekström 26'; Löfgren 35'; Sandell 44' |

Olympic Stadium, Helsinki
Attendance: 15,465
Referee: Helge Andersen (Denmark)
24 June 1956
13:30 (UTC+1:00)

| Denmark | 2-3 | Norway |
|---|---|---|
| Lundberg 61' (pen.); Pedersen 81' | Report | Dybwad 3'; Sandengen 10', 64' |

Idrætsparken Copenhagen
Attendance: 35,600
Referee: Sten Ahlner (Sweden)
26 August 1956
13:15 (UTC+1:00)

| Norway | 1-1 | Finland |
|---|---|---|
| Høivik 62' | Report | Forsgren 8' |

Ullevaal Stadion, Oslo
Attendance: 20,345
Referee: Gösta Lindberg (Sweden)
16 September 1956
14:00 (UTC+2:00)

| Finland | 0-4 | Denmark |
|---|---|---|
| | Report | Pedersen 31'; J. Hansen 39'; Andersen 44', 87' |

Olympic Stadium, Helsinki
Attendance: 14,914
Referee: Øivind Helgesen (Norway)
16 September 1956
13:15 (UTC+1:00)

| Norway | 3-1 | Sweden |
|---|---|---|
| Gundersen 15', 59'; Kure 55' | Report | Sandberg 71' |

Ullevaal Stadion, Oslo
Attendance: 32,952
Referee: Väinö Niemi (Finland)
21 October 1956
13:30 (UTC+1:00)

| Sweden | 1-1 | Denmark |
|---|---|---|
| Löfgren 81' | Report | J. P. Hansen 28' |

Råsunda Stadium, Stockholm
Attendance: 36,700
Referee: Orjo Pättiniemi (Finland)

=== 1957 ===
30 June 1957
13:30 (UTC+1:00)

| Denmark | 1-2 | Sweden |
|---|---|---|
| J. P. Hansen 17' (pen.) | Report | Källgren 40', 77' |

Idrætsparken Copenhagen
Attendance: 51,600
Referee: Gunnar Andersen (Norway)
1 September 1957
14:00 (UTC+2:00)

| Finland | 0-4 | Norway |
|---|---|---|
| | Report | Kristiansen 7', 60'; Kristoffersen 18'; Hennum 40' |

Olympic Stadium, Helsinki
Attendance: 15,684
Referee: Sten Ahlner (Sweden)
22 September 1957
13:15 (UTC+1:00)

| Norway | 2-2 | Denmark |
|---|---|---|
| Kristoffersen 21', 34' | Report | Pedersen 9'; Kjær 65' |

Ullevaal Stadion, Oslo
Attendance: 33,321
Referee: Yrjö Kaivola (Finland)
22 September 1957
14:00 (UTC+1:00)

| Sweden | 5-1 | Finland |
|---|---|---|
| Gren 18', 50', 77'; Källgren 62'; Jonsson 73' | Report | Sundelin 72' |

Råsunda Stadium, Stockholm
Attendance: 22,192
Referee: Carl Frederik Jørgensen (Denmark)
13 October 1957
13:30 (UTC+1:00)

| Denmark | 3-0 | Finland |
|---|---|---|
| F. Hansen 55'; Nielsen 62'; Machon 71' | Report |

Idrætsparken Copenhagen
Attendance: 33,200
Referee: GBobby Davidson (Scotland)
13 October 1957
13:30 (UTC+1:00)

| Sweden | 5-2 | Norway |
|---|---|---|
| Simonsson 1', 56'; Sandberg 48'; Ekström 62'; Gren 90' | Report | Hennum 80' (pen.); Thoresen 83' |

Råsunda Stadium, Stockholm
Attendance: 29,840
Referee: Albert Dusch (West Germany)

=== 1958 ===
15 June 1958
18:00 (UTC+1:00)

| Norway | 2-0 | Finland |
|---|---|---|
| Pedersen 35'; Hennum 54' | Report |

Ullevaal Stadion, Oslo
Attendance: 17,173
Referee: Gottfried Dienst (Switzerland)
29 June 1958
18:30 (UTC+1:00)

| Denmark | 1-2 | Norway |
|---|---|---|
| P. Pedersen 56' | Report | Borgen 2'; A. Pedersen 58' |

Idrætsparken Copenhagen
Attendance: 31,500
Referee: Gösta Lindberg (Sweden)
20 August 1958
18:15 (UTC+2:00)

| Finland | 1-7 | Sweden |
|---|---|---|
| Korpela 52' | Report | Börjesson 13', 18'; Jonsson 39', 50', 69'; Källgren 65'; Simonsson 90' |

Olympic Stadium, Helsinki
Attendance: 13,395
Referee: Harald Heltberg (Norway)
14 September 1958
13:15 (UTC+1:00)

| Finland | 1-4 | Denmark |
|---|---|---|
| Pahlman 80' | Report | Pedersen 13'; Machon 48'; Danielsen 51', 68' |

Olympic Stadium, Helsinki
Attendance: 9,272
Referee: Pyotr Belov (Soviet Union)
14 September 1958
13:15 (UTC+1:00)

| Norway | 0-2 | Sweden |
|---|---|---|
| | Report | Börjesson 2'; Simonsson 56' |

Ullevaal Stadion, Oslo
Attendance: 32,791
Referee: Carl Frederik Jørgensen (Denmark)
26 October 1958
13:30 (UTC+1:00)

| Sweden | 4-4 | Denmark |
|---|---|---|
| Berndtsson 9'; Börjesson 32'; Gren 40' (pen.), 70' | Report | Mdsen 11', 87'; Enoksen 36'; Sørensen 53' |

Råsunda Stadium, Stockholm
Attendance: 43,938
Referee: Orjo Pättiniemi (Finland)

=== 1959 ===
21 June 1959
13:30 (UTC+1:00)

| Denmark | 0-6 | Sweden |
|---|---|---|
| | Report | Bild 10', 44'; Simonsson 35'; Berndtsson 40', 85'; Backman 42' |

Idrætsparken Copenhagen
Attendance: 53,000
Referee: Albert Alsteen (Belgium)
28 June 1959
19:00 (UTC+2:00)

| Finland | 2-4 | Norway |
|---|---|---|
| Kankkonen 75', 88' | Report | Larsen 6'; Hennum 10', 49'; Borgen 18' |

Olympic Stadium, Helsinki
Attendance: 11,915
Referee: Aage Poulsen (Denmark)
2 August 1959
18:00 (UTC+1:00)

| Sweden | 3-1 | Finland |
|---|---|---|
| Bild 7'; Börjesson 23'; Simonsson 48' | Report | Nevalainen 13' |

Malmö Stadion, Malmö
Attendance: 19,555
Referee: Carl Frederik Jørgensen (Denmark)
13 September 1959
13:15 (UTC+2:00)

| Norway | 2-4 | Denmark |
|---|---|---|
| A. Sørensen 38'; Kristiansen 56' | Report | Nielsen 29'; Enoksen 53', 89'; Pedersen 64' |

Ullevaal Stadion, Oslo
Attendance: 30,142
Referee: Ken Aston (England)
4 October 1959
13:30 (UTC+1:00)

| Denmark | 4-0 | Finland |
|---|---|---|
| Nielsen 20', 22', 53'; Kramer 81' | Report |

Idrætsparken Copenhagen
Attendance: 35,500
Referee: Leif Gulliksen (Norway)
18 October 1959

| Sweden | 6-2 | Norway |
|---|---|---|
| Simonsson 14'; Berndtsson 21'; Börjesson 26', 48', 75'; Thillberg 61' | Report | Backe 67'; Hennum 77' |

Ullevi, Gothenburg
Attendance: 49,673
Referee: Aatos Marttila (Finland)

== Table ==
'Two points for a victory, one point for a draw, no points for a loss.

| | Team | Pld | W | D | L | GF | GA | GD | Pts |
|---|---|---|---|---|---|---|---|---|---|
| 1 | Sweden | 12 | 9 | 2 | 1 | 45 | 17 | +28 | 20 |
| 2 | Norway | 12 | 6 | 2 | 4 | 27 | 26 | +1 | 14 |
| 3 | Denmark | 12 | 5 | 3 | 4 | 30 | 23 | +7 | 13 |
| 4 | Finland | 12 | 0 | 1 | 11 | 8 | 44 | –36 | 1 |

== Winners ==
1956–59 Nordic Football Championship winners

Sweden
Fifth title

== Statistics ==
=== Goalscorers ===
There were 110 goals scored in 24 matches, for an average of 4.58 goals per match.

7 goals

- (Sweden) Agne Simonsson

6 goals

- (Denmark) Poul Pedersen
- (Norway) Harald Hennum
- (Sweden) Gunnar Gren
- (Sweden) Rune Börjesson

4 goals

- (Denmark) Harald Nielsen
- (Sweden) Henry Källgren
- (Sweden) Bengt Berndtsson
- (Sweden) Torbjörn Jonsson

3 goals

- (Denmark) Henning Enoksen
- (Norway) Kjell Kristiansen
- (Norway) Per Kristoffersen
- (Sweden) Harry Bild

2 goals

- (Denmark) Jens Peter Hansen
- (Denmark) Mogens Machon
- (Denmark) John Danielsen
- (Denmark) Ole Madsen
- (Denmark) Ove Andersen
- (Finland) Hannu Kankkonen
- (Sweden) Jan Ekström
- (Sweden) Gösta Löfgren
- (Sweden) Reino Börjesson
- (Sweden) Gösta Sandberg
- (Norway) Knut Sandengen
- (Norway) Finn Gundersen
- (Norway) Arne Pedersen
- (Norway) Bjørn Borgen

1 goal

- (Denmark) John Kramer
- (Denmark) Peder Kjær
- (Denmark) Finn Hansen
- (Denmark) Ove Bech Nielsen
- (Denmark) Jørgen Hansen
- (Denmark) Knud Lundberg
- (Denmark) Jørn Sørensen
- (Finland) Olavi Lahtinen
- (Finland) Kai Pahlman
- (Finland) Unto Nevalainen
- (Finland) Olli Forsgren
- (Finland) Matti Sundelin
- (Finland) Kauko Korpela
- (Sweden) Nils-Åke Sandell
- (Sweden) Lennart Backman
- (Sweden) Henry Thillberg
- (Norway) Åge Sørensen
- (Norway) Arne Høivik
- (Norway) Harry Kure
- (Norway) Gunnar Dybwad
- (Norway) Rolf Bjørn Backe
- (Norway) Gunnar Thoresen
- (Norway) Ragnar Larsen

== See also ==
Balkan Cup
Baltic Cup
Central European International Cup
Mediterranean Cup
