= List of Molde FK seasons =

This is a list of seasons played by Molde Fotballklubb in Norwegian and European football, regional league seasons from 1915 to 1937 and national league seasons from 1937–38 to the most recent completed season. It details the club's achievements in major competitions, and the top scorers for some season. The statistics is up to date as of the end of the 2024 season.

== 1915–1936 ==
Season	Regional league		Cup
Season	Division	Pos	Cup
1915	Kretsserien (Romsdalske)	4th	DNP
1916	Kretsserien (Romsdalske)	4th	DNP
1917	Did not compete due to World War I.		DNP
1918	Did not compete due to World War I.		DNP
1919	Kretsserien (Romsdalske)	—N/a	DNP
1920	Kretsserien (Romsdalske)	—N/a	DNP
1921	Kretsserien (Romsdalske)	—N/a	QR
1922	Kretsserien (Romsdalske)	1st	1R
1923	Kretsserien (Romsdalske)	—N/a	1R
1924	Kretsserien (Romsdalske)	—N/a	DNP
1925	Kretsserien (Romsdalske)	—N/a	2R
1926	Kretsserien (Romsdalske)	—N/a	1R
1927	Kretsserien (Romsdalske)	—N/a	DNP
1928	Kretsserien (Romsdalske)	—N/a	DNP
1929	Kretsserien (Romsdalske)	—N/a	DNP
1930	Kretsserien (Nordmøre og Romsdal)	—N/a	1R
1931	Kretsserien (Nordmøre og Romsdal)	—N/a	1R
1932	Kretsserien (Nordmøre og Romsdal)	—N/a	QR
1933	Kretsserien (Nordmøre og Romsdal)	—N/a	DNP
1934	Kretsserien (Romsdal)	—N/a	DNP
1935	Kretsserien (Romsdal)	1st	DNP
1936	Kretsserien (Romsdal)	—N/a	DNP
1937	Kretsserien (Romsdal)	—N/a	1R

== 1937– ==
Season	League											Cup	Europe	Top goalscorer		Ref
Season	Tier	Division (Grp.)	P	W	D	L	GF	GA	Pts	Pos.	Att.	Cup	Europe	Name	Goals	Ref
1937–38	2	2. divisjon (VII)								1st	—	1R				
1938–39	2	2. divisjon (VII)								1st	—	1R				
1939–40	1	Norgesserien (VII)	6	1	0	5	8	19	2	n/a	—	2R				
1945	—		No league season									1R				
1946	—		No league season									1R				
1947	—		No league season									1R				
1947–48	1	Norgesserien (VII)	10	5	1	4	16	13	11	↓ 3rd	—	1R				
1948–49	2	1. divisjon (VII)	10	6	1	3	21	9	13	1st	—	2R		Holen	5*	
1949–50	2	1. divisjon (VII)	10	4	3	3	20	13	11	3rd	—	2R		O. Legernes, Hemnes	5*	
1950–51	2	1. divisjon (VII)	10	6	2	2	18	6	14	2nd	—	2R		A. Legernes	4*	
1951–52	2	Landsdelss. (Møre)	14	5	1	8	23	20	11	6th	—	3R				
1952–53	2	Landsdelss. (Møre)	14	9	1	4	40	23	19	2nd	—	3R				
1953–54	2	Landsdelss. (Møre)	14	10	3	1	43	13	21	1st	—	3R				
1954–55	2	Landsdelss. (Møre)	14	4	5	5	26	18	13	2nd	—	3R				
1955–56	2	Landsdelss. (Møre)	14	13	0	1	39	6	26	1st	—	3R		Elvsaas	20	
1956–57	2	Landsdelss. (Møre)	14	11	2	1	60	12	24	↑ 1st	—	3R		Eikrem; Elvsaas	14; 13*	
1957–58	1	Hovedserien (B)	14	1	5	8	18	38	7	↓ 7th	—	3R		Eikrem, Elvsaas	6	
1958–59	2	Landsdelss. (Møre)	14	6	3	5	33	25	15	4th	—	1R				
1959–60	2	Landsdelss. (Møre)	14	4	2	8	26	28	10	6th	—	2R				
1960–61	2	Landsdelss. (Møre)	14	4	5	5	26	29	13	5th	—	2R				
1961–62	2	Landsdelss. (Møre)	21	8	3	10	42	51	19	↓ 4th	—	2R				
1963	3	3. div (Møre)	14	3	4	7	22	34	10	5th	—	1R				
1964	3	3. div (Møre)	14	7	4	3	28	16	18	2nd	—	4R				
1965	3	3. div (Møre)	14	10	1	3	37	16	21	2nd	—	3R		Fuglset	15*	
1966	3	3. div (Møre)	14	9	1	4	35	18	19	2nd	—	3R		Fuglset	16*	
1967	3	3. div (Møre)	14	9	1	4	38	16	19	2nd	—	3R		Austnes, Fuglset	7*	
1968	3	3. div (Møre)	14	10	2	2	30	12	22	2nd	—	QF		Hestad	12	
1969	3	3. div (Møre)	14	10	2	2	34	11	22	1st	—	2R		Hestad	14*	
1970	3	3. div (Møre)	14	10	3	1	28	8	23	↑ 1st	—	1R		O. Berg	12*	
1971	2	2. divisjon (B)	14	4	3	7	16	19	11	6th	—	4R		O. Berg	7	
1972	2	2. divisjon (B)	18	9	3	6	29	23	21	5th	—	QF		O. Berg	9*	
1973	2	2. divisjon (B)	18	14	3	1	58	19	31	↑ 1st	—	QF		Hestad; O. Berg; Fuglset	9*; 7*; 7*	
1974	1	1. divisjon	22	12	6	4	40	18	30	2nd	5,294	QF		O. Berg	13	
1975	1	1. divisjon	22	7	8	7	27	29	22	8th	3,805	4R	UEFA Cup – R1	Fuglset	8	
1976	1	1. divisjon	22	9	3	10	34	29	21	6th	3,585	4R		Fuglset	17	
1977	1	1. divisjon	22	12	3	7	31	28	27	3rd	5,508	1R		Fuglset	8	
1978	1	1. divisjon	22	5	2	15	30	39	12	↓ 10th	2,784	4R	UEFA Cup – R1	Hestad, Fuglset, Rye	5	
1979	2	2. divisjon (B)	22	12	7	3	52	22	31	↑ 2nd	—	4R		Hestad	12	
1980	1	1. divisjon	22	6	6	10	30	39	18	↓ 10th	3,105	4R		Fuglset	7	
1981	2	2. divisjon (B)	22	10	9	3	41	20	29	↑ 2nd	—	4R		Ulvestad	13*	
1982	1	1. divisjon	22	4	8	10	26	41	16	↓ 12th	3,145	2nd		J. Berg	8	
1983	2	2. divisjon (B)	22	17	4	1	60	18	38	↑ 1st	—	2R		J. Berg	16	
1984	1	1. divisjon	22	7	7	8	36	41	21	8th	3,345	4R		Hestad	6	
1985	1	1. divisjon	22	7	7	8	25	33	21	8th	2,714	1R		Ulvestad	6	
1986	1	1. divisjon	22	7	6	9	26	33	20	9th	2,702	3R		Rekdal	6	
1987	1	1. divisjon	22	11	5	6	27	20	38	2nd	4,431	3R		J. Berg, Rekdal	7	
1988	1	1. divisjon	22	10	9	3	40	32	37	3rd	3,473	QF	UEFA Cup – R1	Flo, Rekdal	10	
1989	1	1. divisjon	22	11	4	7	40	32	37	4th	3,437	2nd		Flo	12	
1990	1	Tippeligaen	22	12	4	6	34	29	40	3rd	3,369	4R		Belsvik	12	
1991	1	Tippeligaen	22	7	6	9	33	38	27	7th	3,298	4R		Neerland	11	
1992	1	Tippeligaen	22	11	3	8	30	30	36	6th	4,133	QF		Sundgot	12	
1993	1	Tippeligaen	22	5	7	10	23	36	22	↓ 10th	3,520	QF		Strand	9	
1994	2	1. divisjon (2)	22	13	3	6	44	25	42	↑ 2nd	—	W		Stavrum	19	
1995	1	Tippeligaen	26	14	5	7	60	47	47	2nd	4,987	4R	Cup Winner's Cup – R1	Solskjær	20	
1996	1	Tippeligaen	26	9	6	11	45	38	33	8th	4,246	4R	UEFA Cup – QR2	Solskjær	11	
1997	1	Tippeligaen	26	13	6	7	47	36	45	4th	3,965	2R		Olsen	13	
1998	1	Tippeligaen	26	16	6	4	70	34	54	2nd	8,516	QF	UEFA Cup – QR2	Lund	16	
1999	1	Tippeligaen	26	16	2	8	49	37	50	2nd	7,163	SF	Champions League – R1	Lund	21	
2000	1	Tippeligaen	26	11	7	8	46	47	40	7th	6,816	QF	UEFA Cup – 1R	Hoseth	15	
2001	1	Tippeligaen	26	13	5	8	54	41	44	5th	6,601	4R		Hoseth	10	
2002	1	Tippeligaen	26	15	5	6	48	26	50	2nd	6,193	3R		Lindbæk, Hulsker	9	
2003	1	Tippeligaen	26	9	4	13	32	41	31	9th	5,945	3R	UEFA Cup – R2	Hoseth	11	
2004	1	Tippeligaen	26	7	10	9	34	37	31	11th	5,554	3R		Hulsker, Mork, Hoseth	4	
2005	1	Tippeligaen	26	8	6	12	40	46	30	12th	6,512	W		Friend	10	
2006	1	Tippeligaen	26	7	4	15	29	50	25	↓ 14th	6,127	3R	UEFA Cup – R1	P. P. Diouf	5	
2007	2	1. divisjon	30	22	3	5	62	28	69	↑ 1st	6,344	1R		M. B. Diouf	10	
2008	1	Tippeligaen	26	8	6	12	39	43	31	9th	8,203	SF		Mota	12	
2009	1	Tippeligaen	30	17	5	8	62	35	56	2nd	7,965	2nd		M. B. Diouf	16	
2010	1	Tippeligaen	30	10	10	10	42	45	40	11th	8,413	3R	Europa League – 3QR	Fall	16	
2011	1	Tippeligaen	30	17	7	6	55	38	58	1st	9,817	QF		P. P Diouf	12	
2012	1	Tippeligaen	30	19	5	6	51	31	62	1st	9,338	SF	Champions League – 3QR; Europa League – GS	Angan	13	
2013	1	Tippeligaen	30	12	8	10	47	38	44	6th	8,828	W	Champions League – 3QR; Europa League – PO	Chima Chukwu	9	
2014	1	Tippeligaen	30	22	5	3	62	24	71	1st	9,243	W	Europa League – 3QR	Elyounoussi	13	
2015	1	Tippeligaen	30	15	7	8	62	31	52	6th	8,952	QF	Champions League – 3QR; Europa League – R32	Kamara	14	
2016	1	Tippeligaen	30	13	6	11	48	42	45	5th	8,392	3R		Elyounoussi, Singh	5	
2017	1	Eliteserien	30	16	6	8	50	35	54	2nd	7,785	SF		Bergmann Sigurðarson	16	
2018	1	Eliteserien	30	18	5	7	63	36	59	2nd	7,111	2R	Europa League – PO	Haaland	12	
2019	1	Eliteserien	30	21	5	4	72	31	68	1st	6,956	3R	Europa League – PO	James	17	
2020	1	Eliteserien	30	20	2	8	77	36	62	2nd	200	Cancelled	Europa League – R16	James	13	
2021	1	Eliteserien	30	18	6	6	70	40	60	2nd	600	W	Europa Conference League – Q3	Omoijuanfo	27	
2022	1	Eliteserien	30	25	3	2	71	25	78	1st	6,388	QF	Europa Conference League – GS	Fofana	15	
2023	1	Eliteserien	30	15	6	9	65	39	51	5th	6,681	W	Europa Conference League – KRPO	Breivik; Brynhildsen; Grødem	7	
2024	1	Eliteserien	30	15	7	8	64	36	52	5th	7,175	2nd	Europa League – PO; Conference League – R16	Eikrem	14	
