= List of Molde FK managers =

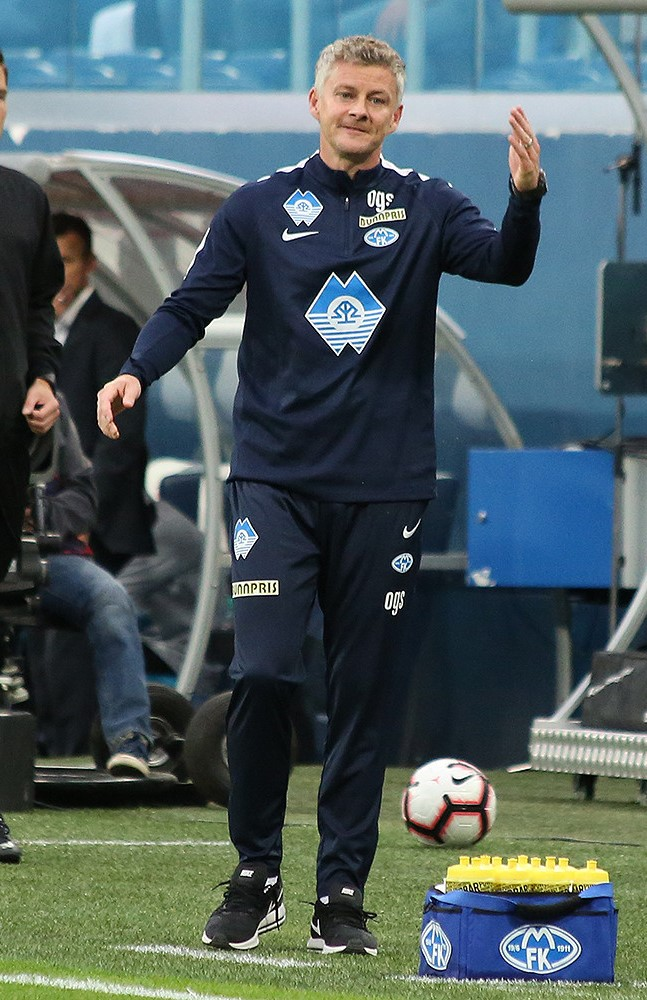
Ole Gunnar Solskjær, the most decorated manager or head coach in the history of Molde Fotballklubb

Molde FK is a Norwegian professional football club based in Molde, Møre og Romsdal. The club was founded as International in 1911, and changed its name to Molde in 1915. Molde FK currently play in the Eliteserien, the top tier of Norwegian football. They have not been out of the top tier since 2007. They have been involved in European football several times since their debut in 1975. In 1999 Molde became the second Norwegian club to enter the UEFA Champions League.

Erling Moe is the current manager of the club since taking over as a caretaker manager on 19 December 2018 when Ole Gunnar Solskjær left the position to manage Manchester United as a caretaker manager. On 29 April 2019 it was announced that Moe signed a contract as permanent head coach till the end of the 2020 season.

The most successful person to manage Molde is Ole Gunnar Solskjær, who won two Eliteserien titles and one Norwegian Cup, all in his first of two managerial spells at the club. The longest-serving head coach in terms of games is Åge Hareide, who lead Molde in 280 games in all competitions between 1986 and 1997.

== Statistics ==
The list shows every person with the main responsibility for Molde FKs performances since this position was created ahead of the 1956–57 season. This role has had different names over the years; "Coach", "Head Coach" and "Manager".

Information correct as of 9 December 2023. Only competitive matches are counted (League, Promotion/relegation play-offs, Cup, Europe).

Table headers

- Nationality – If the manager played international football as a player, the country/countries he played for are shown. Otherwise, the manager's nationality is given as their country of birth.
- From – The year of the manager's first game for Molde FK.
- To – The year of the manager's last game for Molde FK.
- P – The number of games managed for Molde FK.
- W – The number of games won as a manager.
- D – The number of games draw as a manager.
- L – The number of games lost as a manager.
- GF – The number of goals scored under his management.
- GA – The number of goals conceded under his management.
- Win% – The total winning percentage under his management.
- Honours – The trophies won while managing Molde FK.

Key

- (n/a) = Information not available
- ^{p} = Player-manager

List of Molde FK managers
Image	Name	Nationality	From	To	P	W	D	L	GF	GA	Win% (Note: Win% is rounded to two decimal places)	Honours	Notes
	Arne Legernes^{p} and Gunnar Talsethagen	Norway	1956	1957	(n/a)	(n/a)	(n/a)	(n/a)	(n/a)	(n/a)	(n/a)		
	Charlie Pohl	Germany	1958	1958	(n/a)	(n/a)	(n/a)	(n/a)	(n/a)	(n/a)	(n/a)		
	Gunnar Talsethagen (Note: Results from the Norwegian Cup is missing.)	Norway	1959	1961	31	9	7	15	56	61	29.03		
	Ulf Møller^{p}	Norway	1962	1962	23	9	3	11	47	55	39.13		
	Gunnar Talsethagen	Norway	1963	1968	102	59	14	29	245	141	57.84		
	Harry Hestad^{p} and Torkild Brakstad^{p}	Norway	1969	1969	20	12	3	5	48	19	60.00	1 3. divisjon (Møre) title	
	Torkild Brakstad^{p}	Norway	1970	1971	36	18	8	10	53	34	50.00	1 3. divisjon (Møre) title	
	Torkild Brakstad^{p} and Harry Hestad^{p} (Note: Hestad from 1 July when he returned from FC Den Haag.)	Norway	1 January 1972	1972	23	12	4	7	45	28	52.17		
	Jan Fuglset^{p}	Norway	1973	1973	23	18	3	2	67	22	78.26	1 2. divisjon (B) title	
	Joseph Hooley	England	7 January 1974	19 May 1974	5	3	0	2	9	4	60.00		
	Torkild Brakstad^{p} and Harry Hestad^{p} and Jan Fuglset^{p} (caretakers)	Norway	20 May 1974	1974	22	13	6	3	41	17	59.09		
	Jack Johnsen	Denmark	2 February 1975	1975	27	10	8	9	43	36	37.04		
	Torkild Brakstad^{p} and Jan Fuglset^{p}	Norway	16 January 1976	1976	26	12	3	11	44	36	46.15		
	Huib Ruijgrok	Netherlands	1 March 1977	1979	77	35	13	29	140	127	45.45		
	Torkild Brakstad	Norway	4 January 1980	31 December 1981	53	22	16	15	89	71	41.51		
	Jan Fuglset^{p} (Note: Fuglset retired after the 1981 season, but due to injuries he appeared in 3 matches in the 1982 season.)	Norway	11 January 1982	21 July 1984	68	34	16	18	132	94	50.00	1 2. divisjon (B) title	
	Joseph Hooley	England	22 July 1984	1984	11	4	3	4	20	23	36.36		
	Hans Backe	Sweden	7 January 1985	1985	23	7	7	9	25	35	30.43		
	Harry Hestad and Åge Hareide^{p} (Note: Hareide retired as player after the 1987 season.)	Norway	4 January 1986	1989	110	52	28	30	187	128	47.27		
	Åge Hareide	Norway	5 January 1990	18 August 1991	46	21	10	15	82	70	45.65		
	Ulrich Møller^{p} (caretaker)	Norway	18 August 1991	31 December 1991	6	4	0	2	10	5	66.67		
	Jan Fuglset and Ulrich Møller^{p}	Norway	1 January 1992	31 December 1993	52	22	10	20	80	72	42.31		
	Åge Hareide	Norway	1 January 1994	31 December 1997	124	64	23	37	250	177	51.61	1 Norwegian Cup	
	Erik Brakstad	Norway	1 January 1998	31 October 2000	104	55	19	30	213	157	52.88		
	Gunder Bengtsson	Sweden	1 January 2001	22 May 2003	67	36	12	19	148	80	53.73		
	Odd Berg (caretaker)	Norway	22 May 2003	31 December 2003	27	11	2	14	36	41	40.74		
	Reidar Vågnes	Norway	1 January 2004	5 March 2005	59	19	14	26	77	86	32.20		
	Bo Johansson	Sweden	18 March 2005	31 December 2005	33	15	6	12	57	55	45.45	1 Norwegian Cup	
	Arild Stavrum	Norway	1 January 2006	8 November 2006	33	10	6	17	60	58	30.30		
	Kjell Jonevret	Sweden	1 January 2007	30 August 2010	125	61	27	37	233	172	48.80	1 1. divisjon title	
	Uwe Rösler	Germany	31 August 2010	31 December 2010	8	6	2	0	11	3	75.00		
	Ole Gunnar Solskjær	Norway	10 January 2011	2 January 2014	125	69	25	31	236	143	55.20	2 Eliteserien titles 1 Norwegian Cup	
	Tor Ole Skullerud	Norway	13 January 2014	6 August 2015	65	42	12	11	146	56	64.62	1 Eliteserien title 1 Norwegian Cup	
	Erling Moe (caretaker)	Norway	7 August 2015	21 October 2015	15	7	4	4	24	17	46.67		
	Ole Gunnar Solskjær	Norway	21 October 2015	19 December 2018	118	66	19	33	221	143	55.93		
	Erling Moe	Norway	19 December 2018 (Note: Moe served as caretaker manager until 29 April 2019, when he was hired on a permanent basis.)	8 December 2024	274	169	39	66	534	275	61.68	2 Eliteserien titles 2 Norwegian Cups	
	Per-Mathias Høgmo	Norway	9 January 2025	Present	00	00	00	00	000	000	—		

=== Longest-serving managers ===
This list contains managers leading Molde FK in more than 100 matches.

Longest-serving Molde FK managers
Nr	Name	Nationality	Games	W	D	L	GF	GA	Win%
1	Åge Hareide	Norway	280	137	61	82	519	375	48.93
2	Erling Moe	Norway	274	169	39	66	534	275	61.68
3	Ole Gunnar Solskjær	Norway	243	135	44	64	457	286	55.56
4	Jan Fuglset	Norway	191	99	38	54	364	241	51.83
5	Torkild Brakstad	Norway	180	89	40	51	320	205	49.44
6	Harry Hestad	Norway	175	89	41	45	321	192	50.86
7	Gunnar Talsethagen	Norway	133	68	21	44	301	202	51.13
8	Kjell Jonevret	Sweden	125	61	27	37	233	172	48.80
9	Erik Brakstad	Norway	104	55	19	30	213	157	52.88
