= 1956 in Norwegian football =

Football in Norway
- Season: 1956

Men's football
- Hovedserien: Larvik Turn
- Landsdelsserien: Sparta (Group East/South); Strømmen (Group East/North); Start (Group South/West A1); Ulf (Group South/West A2); Årstad (Group South/West B); Molde (Group Møre); Steinkjer (Group Trøndelag)
- NM: Skeid

The 1956 season was the 51st season of competitive football in Norway.

== Hovedserien 1955/56 ==
Larvik Turn won the Hovedserien title for the third and, as of 2025, final time.

=== Group A ===
Pos	Team	Pld	W	D	L	GF	GA	GD	Pts	Qualification or relegation
1	Larvik Turn (C)	14	10	1	3	40	15	+25	21	Qualification for the championship final
2	Sandefjord BK	14	7	2	5	26	19	+7	16	
3	Viking	14	5	5	4	25	26	−1	15	
4	Vålerengen	14	5	4	5	23	28	−5	14	
5	Rapid	14	4	4	6	23	26	−3	12	
6	Odd	14	4	4	6	18	24	−6	12	
7	Brann (R)	14	4	3	7	27	27	0	11	Relegation
8	Varegg (R)	14	3	5	6	15	32	−17	11	Relegation

Source: RSSSF
(C) Champions; (R) Relegated

=== Group B ===
Pos	Team	Pld	W	D	L	GF	GA	GD	Pts	Qualification or relegation
1	Fredrikstad	14	13	1	0	54	17	+37	27	Qualification for the championship final
2	Asker	14	11	1	2	41	16	+25	23	
3	Skeid	14	7	3	4	34	18	+16	17	
4	Lillestrøm	14	6	1	7	19	25	−6	13	
5	Frigg	14	6	0	8	27	37	−10	12	
6	Sarpsborg FK	14	3	5	6	27	30	−3	11	
7	Kvik (R)	14	2	2	10	12	44	−32	6	Relegation
8	Ranheim (R)	14	1	1	12	12	39	−27	3	Relegation

Source: RSSSF
(R) Relegated

=== Championship final ===
June 3: Larvik Turn-Fredrikstad 3-2

== Landsdelsserien 1955/56 ==
=== Group Østland/Søndre ===
Pos	Team	Pld	W	D	L	GF	GA	GD	Pts	Promotion or relegation
1	Sparta (P)	14	9	2	3	28	16	+12	20	Promotion to Hovedserien
2	Greåker	14	7	4	3	33	12	+21	18	
3	Snøgg	14	6	4	4	33	25	+8	16	
4	Fram	14	7	0	7	22	28	−6	14	
5	Pors	14	4	5	5	23	25	−2	13	
6	Ørn	14	4	4	6	16	20	−4	12	
7	Moss	14	4	3	7	29	26	+3	11	
8	Herkules (R)	14	2	4	8	13	45	−32	8	Relegation to 3. divisjon

Source: rsssf.no
Rules for classification: 1) points; 2) goal difference; 3) number of goals scored.
(P) Promoted; (R) Relegated

=== Group Østland/Nordre ===
Pos	Team	Pld	W	D	L	GF	GA	GD	Pts	Promotion or relegation
1	Strømmen (P)	14	12	1	1	48	17	+31	25	Promotion to Hovedserien
2	Lyn	14	7	3	4	40	20	+20	17	
3	Kapp	14	7	3	4	37	22	+15	17	
4	Raufoss	14	7	3	4	36	26	+10	17	
5	Vestfossen	14	5	3	6	29	34	−5	13	
6	Gjøvik-Lyn	14	4	3	7	21	28	−7	11	
7	Hamar	14	3	2	9	26	51	−25	8	
8	Drafn (R)	14	1	2	11	14	53	−39	4	Relegation to 3. divisjon

Source: rsssf.no
Rules for classification: 1) points; 2) goal difference; 3) number of goals scored.
(P) Promoted; (R) Relegated

=== Group Sørland/Vestland, A1 ===
Pos	Team	Pld	W	D	L	GF	GA	GD	Pts	Qualification or relegation
1	Start	12	8	4	0	32	8	+24	20	Qualification for the promotion play-offs
2	Donn	12	6	3	3	34	23	+11	15	
3	Jerv	12	5	3	4	36	24	+12	13	
4	Flekkefjord	12	6	1	5	23	17	+6	13	
5	Grane	12	4	2	6	25	35	−10	10	
6	Sørfjell	12	3	1	8	17	35	−18	7	
7	Nedenes (R)	12	1	4	7	18	43	−25	6	Relegation to 3. divisjon

Source: rsssf.no
Rules for classification: 1) points; 2) goal difference; 3) number of goals scored.
(R) Relegated

=== Group Sørland/Vestland, A2 ===
Pos	Team	Pld	W	D	L	GF	GA	GD	Pts	Qualification or relegation
1	Ulf	14	8	5	1	29	14	+15	21	Qualification for the promotion play-offs
2	Vard	14	7	3	4	25	15	+10	17	
3	Stavanger	14	7	3	4	29	22	+7	17	
4	Bryne	14	5	4	5	34	27	+7	14	
5	Djerv 1919	14	6	1	7	22	23	−1	13	
6	Vidar	14	5	3	6	17	23	−6	13	
7	Varhaug (R)	14	5	2	7	25	38	−13	12	Relegation to 3. divisjon
8	Kopervik (R)	14	1	3	10	12	31	−19	5	Relegation to 3. divisjon

Source: rsssf.no
Rules for classification: 1) points; 2) goal difference; 3) number of goals scored.
(R) Relegated

=== Group Sørland/Vestland, B ===
Pos	Team	Pld	W	D	L	GF	GA	GD	Pts	Qualification or relegation
1	Årstad (O, P)	12	11	1	0	45	7	+38	23	Qualification for the promotion play-offs
2	Baune	12	6	2	4	26	18	+8	14	
3	Nordnes	12	5	2	5	21	23	−2	12	
4	Nymark	12	4	2	6	18	27	−9	10	
5	Os	12	4	1	7	22	30	−8	9	
6	Fana (R)	12	3	3	6	15	31	−16	9	Relegation to 3. divisjon
7	Djerv (R)	12	2	3	7	17	28	−11	7	Relegation to 3. divisjon

Source: rsssf.no
Rules for classification: 1) points; 2) goal difference; 3) number of goals scored.
(O) Play-off winners; (P) Promoted; (R) Relegated

=== Group Møre ===
Pos	Team	Pld	W	D	L	GF	GA	GD	Pts	Qualification or relegation
1	Molde	14	13	0	1	39	6	+33	26	Qualification for the promotion play-offs
2	Kristiansund	14	11	1	2	40	16	+24	23	
3	Langevåg	14	7	2	5	37	27	+10	16	
4	Hødd	14	6	1	7	27	23	+4	13	
5	Aalesund	14	3	4	7	20	23	−3	10	
6	Braatt	14	4	2	8	21	37	−16	10	
7	Clausenengen (R)	14	3	1	10	20	38	−18	7	Relegation to 3. divisjon
8	Framtid (R)	14	3	1	10	15	49	−34	7	Relegation to 3. divisjon

Source: rsssf.no
Rules for classification: 1) points; 2) goal difference; 3) number of goals scored.
(R) Relegated

=== Group Trøndelag ===
Pos	Team	Pld	W	D	L	GF	GA	GD	Pts	Qualification or relegation
1	Steinkjer (O, P)	14	11	2	1	50	22	+28	24	Qualification for the promotion play-offs
2	Sverre	14	8	3	3	36	24	+12	19	
3	Brage	14	8	2	4	38	26	+12	18	
4	Freidig	14	7	2	5	29	20	+9	16	
5	Stjørdals/Blink	14	5	4	5	28	32	−4	14	
6	Rosenborg (R)	14	3	4	7	15	27	−12	10	Relegation to 3. divisjon
7	Falken (R)	14	4	1	9	26	39	−13	9	Relegation to 3. divisjon
8	Wing (R)	14	1	0	13	9	41	−32	2	Relegation to 3. divisjon

Source: rsssf.no
Rules for classification: 1) points; 2) goal difference; 3) number of goals scored.
(O) Play-off winners; (P) Promoted; (R) Relegated

=== Play-off Sørland/Vestland ===
June 3: Ulf - Start 6-3

June 10: Årstad - Ulf 2-0

Årstad promoted.

=== Play-off Møre/Trøndelag ===
June 3: Molde - Steinkjer 2-4

June 10: Steinkjer - Molde 3-2 (agg. 7–4)

Steinkjer promoted.

== First Division ==
=== District I ===
1. Lisleby (Promoted)
2. Selbak
3. Sprint/Jeløy
4. Hafslund
5. Borgen
6. Tune
7. Torp
8. Askim

=== District II, Group A ===
1. Mjøndalen (Play-off)
2. Åssiden
3. Geithus
4. Sagene
5. Jevnaker
6. Solberg
7. Steinberg
8. Liull

=== District II, Group B ===
1. Spartacus (Play-off)
2. Sandaker
3. Bjørkelangen
4. Grue
5. Grüner
6. Sørli
7. Aurskog
8. Aasen

=== District III ===
1. Hamarkameratene (Play-off)
2. Fremad
3. Einastrand
4. Vardal
5. Gjøvik SK
6. Mesna
7. Vang
8. Stange

=== District IV, Group A ===
1. Eik (Play-off)
2. Tønsberg Turn
3. Urædd
4. Brevik
5. Kragerø
6. Teie
7. Tønsbergkam.
8. Sem

=== District IV, Group B ===
1. Storm (Play-off)
2. Borg
3. Rjukan
4. Ulefoss
5. Gjerpen
6. Drangedal
7. Skiens BK
8. Gvarv

=== District V, Group A1 (Aust-Agder) ===
1. Risør (Play-off)
2. Trauma
3. Rygene
4. Dristug
5. Arendals BK
Tvedestrand (withdrew)

=== District V, Group A2 (Vest-Agder) ===
1. Vindbjart (Play-off)
2. AIK Lund
3. Vigør
4. Mandalskam.
5. Farsund
6. Våg

=== District V, Group B1 (Rogaland) ===
1. Nærbø (Promoted)
2. Ålgård
3. Randaberg
4. Egersund
5. Klepp
6. Brusand

=== District V, Group B2 (Rogaland) ===
1. Jarl (Promoted)
2. Buøy
3. Haugar
4. Torvastad
5. Vaulen
6. Riska

=== District VI, Group A (Bergen) ===
1. Hardy (Play-off)
2. Sandviken
3. Fjellkameratene
4. Viggo
5. Laksevåg
6. Trane
7. Minde

=== District VI, Group B (Midthordland) ===
1. Erdal (Play-off)
2. Voss
3. Florvåg
4. Eidsvåg (Åsane)
5. Ålvik
6. Fyllingen
7. Kjøkkelvik

=== District VII, Group A (Sunnmøre) ===
1. Rollon (Play-off)
2. Herd
3. Volda
4. Aksla
5. Velled./Ringen
6. Sykkylven
7. Hareid
8. Ørsta

=== District VII, Group B (Romsdal) ===
1. Kleive (Play-off)
2. Åndalsnes
3. Eide
4. Måndalen
5. Isfjorden
6. Frode
7. Olymp (withdrew)

=== District VII, Group C (Nordmøre) ===
1. Framtid (Play-off)
2. Dahle
3. Goma
4. Halsa
5. Sunndal
6. Tingvoll
7. Nordlandet
8. Enge

=== District VIII, Group A1 (Sør-Trøndelag) ===
1. Heimdal (Play-off)
2. Melhus
3. Flå
4. Leik
5. Leinstrand

Hommelvik (disqualified)

=== District VIII, Group A2 (Nord-Trøndelag) ===
1. Troll (Play-off)
2. Orkanger
3. Løkken
4. Rindal
5. Svorkmo
6. Orkdal

=== District VIII, Group B (Trondheim og omegn) ===
1. Trond (Play-off)
2. National
3. Tryggkameratene
4. Nidar
5. Ørn (Trondheim)
6. Strindheim
7. NTHI
8. Rapp

=== District VIII, Group C (Fosen) ===
1. Opphaug (Play-off)
2. Fevåg
3. Stadsbygd
4. Lensvik
5. Beian
6. Uthaug
Rissa (withdrew)

=== District VIII, Group D (Nord-Trøndelag/Namdal) ===
1. Nessegutten (Play-off)
2. Verdal
3. Neset
4. Namsos
5. Malm
6. Fram (Skatval)
7. Byafossen

Blink (withdrew and merged with Stjørdal)

=== District IX ===
1. Mo
2. Bodø/Glimt
3. Brønnøysund
4. Mosjøen
5. Grand
6. Saltdalkam.

=== District X ===
1. Harstad
2. Mjølner
3. Narvik/Nor
4. Tromsø
5. Finnsnes
6. Ballangen

=== Play-off District II/III ===
Spartacus - Mjøndalen 1-2

Mjøndalen - Hamarkameratene 3-1

Hamarkameratene - Spartacus 2-4

Pos	Team	Pld	W	D	L	GF	GA	GD	Pts	Promotion
1	Mjøndalen	2	2	0	0	5	2	+3	4	Promoted
2	Spartacus	2	1	0	1	5	4	+1	2	Promoted
3	Hamarkameratene	2	0	0	2	3	7	−4	0	

=== Championship District II ===
Spartacus - Mjøndalen 1-2

=== Play-off District IV ===
Eik - Storm 2-0

Storm - Eik 0-5 (agg. 0–7)

Eik promoted

=== Play-off District V ===
Vindbjart - Risør 0-3

Risør - Vindbjart 2-4 (agg. 5–4)

Risør promoted.

=== Championship District V ===
Jarl - Nærbø 6-3

Nærbø - Jarl 1-1 (agg. 4–7)

Risør - Jarl 2-5

=== Play-off District VI ===
Hardy - Erdal 1-0

Hardy promoted.

=== Play-off District VII ===
Kleive - Rollon 1-2

Framtid - Kleive 7-0

Rollon - Framtid 1-3

Pos	Team	Pld	W	D	L	GF	GA	GD	Pts	Promotion
1	Framtid	2	2	0	0	10	1	+9	4	Promoted
2	Rollon	2	1	0	1	3	4	−1	2	Promoted
3	Kleive	2	0	0	2	1	9	−8	0	

=== Play-off District VIII ===
Heimdal - Troll?

Opphaug - Troll 1-7

Trond - Nessegutten 0-1

Opphaug - Trond 1-3

Troll - Nessegutten 2-3

Nessegutten - Opphaug 7-1

Troll - Trond 3-1

Pos	Team	Pld	W	D	L	GF	GA	GD	Pts	Promotion
1	Nessegutten	3	3	0	0	11	3	+8	6	Promoted
2	Troll	3	2	0	1	12	5	+7	4	Promoted
3	Trond	3	1	0	2	4	5	−1	2	
4	Opphaug	3	0	0	3	3	17	−14	0	

=== Relegation play-off District II ===
Steinberg - Aurskog 0-8

Steinberg relegated.

== National Cup ==
Skeid won the national cup championship for the third consecutive year.

=== Final ===
21 October 1956

Skeid	2–1	Larvik Turn
Hennum 21'; Gundersen 28'	Report	Sundby 65'

Ullevaal Stadion, Oslo
Attendance: 33,444
Referee: Gunnar Andersen (Ulefoss)

== Northern Norwegian Cup ==
=== Final ===
Tromsø	2–0	Harstad
	Report

== National team ==
Date	Venue	Opponent	Res.*	Comp.	Norwegian goalscorers
May 30	Oslo	Poland	0–0	F	
June 13	Oslo	West Germany	1–3	F	Gunnar Dybwad
June 24	Copenhagen	Denmark	3–2	NC series	Gunnar Dybwad, Knut Sandengen
June 28	Bucharest	Romania	0–2	F	
August 26	Oslo	Finland	1–1	NC series	Arne Høivik
September 16	Oslo	Sweden	3–1	NC series	Harry Kure, Finn Gundersen (2)
October 28	Warsaw	Poland	3–5	F	Harry Kure, Gunnar Dybwad (2)

Note: Norway's goals first
Explanation:

- F = Friendly

October 28: Poland – Norway 5–3
