= 1955–56 Molde FK season =

Molde
1955–56 season
- Chairman: Johan Furseth
- Coach: Birger Karlberg
- Stadium: Rivalbanen (until 21 August 1955); Molde Stadion (from 28 August 1955)
- Landsdelsserien (Møre): 1st
- Norwegian Cup: Third Round vs Sparta
- Top goalscorer: League: Kåre Elvsaas (20); All: Kåre Elvsaas (23)

The 1955–56 season was Molde's 8th consecutive year in the second tier of Norwegian football, their fifth in Landsdelsserien.

This season, Molde competed in Landsdelsserien and the 1956 Norwegian Cup.

== Season events ==
On 28 August 1955, Molde opened their new stadium with a 1–0 win against Aalesund. Arne Hemnes scored the first goal in the 34th minute of the game. Approximately 2,500 spectators attended the opening game at Molde Stadion.

== Squad ==
Note: Flags indicate national team as defined under FIFA eligibility rules; some limited exceptions apply. Players may hold more than one non-FIFA nationality.

| No. | Pos. | Nation | Player |
|---|---|---|---|
| — | GK | (Norway) NOR | Sigurd Moe |
| — | GK | (Norway) NOR | Petter Pettersson |
| — | DF | (Norway) NOR | Harry Elvsaas |
| — | DF | (Norway) NOR | Tor Hammervoll |
| — | DF | (Norway) NOR | Monrad Lange |
| — | DF | (Norway) NOR | Terje Mjåseth |
| — | DF | (Norway) NOR | Ulf Myhre |
| — | DF | (Norway) NOR | Ulf Møller |
| — | DF | (Norway) NOR | Kjell Sandberg |
| — | MF | (Norway) NOR | Magnar Bugge |

| No. | Pos. | Nation | Player |
|---|---|---|---|
| — | MF | (Norway) NOR | Rolf Huseby |
| — | MF | (Norway) NOR | Arne Legernes |
| — | MF | (Norway) NOR | Bjørn Legernes |
| — | MF | (Norway) NOR | Lars Lie |
| — | MF | (Norway) NOR | K. Samuelsen |
| — | MF | (Norway) NOR | Per Sandhaug |
| — | FW | (Norway) NOR | Kåre Elvsaas |
| — | FW | (Norway) NOR | Arne Hemnes |
| — | FW | (Norway) NOR | Arnvid Sannes |
| — | FW | (Norway) NOR | Magnar Årøe |

== Friendlies ==
| 22 April 1956 | Rollon | 2 – 4 | Molde | Ålesund |
| | Goal | | K. Elvsaas; K. Elvsaas; A. Legernes; Hemnes | Stadium: Nørvebanen |

| 29 April 1956 | Molde | 10 – 1 | Clausenengen | Molde |
| | K. Elvsaas; K. Elvsaas; K. Elvsaas; K. Elvsaas; K. Elvsaas; Eikrem; Eikrem; Årøe; Årøe; Hemnes | | Goal | Stadium: Reknesbanen |

| 6 May 1956 | Molde | 3 – 1 | Sunndalen | Molde |
| | Goal | | Goal | Stadium: Rivalbanen; Attendance: 500 |

== Competitions ==
=== Landsdelsserien (Møre) ===
==== Results summary ====
| Overall | | | | | | | | Home | | | | | | Away | | | | | |
| Pld | W | D | L | GF | GA | GD | Pts | W | D | L | GF | GA | GD | W | D | L | GF | GA | GD |
|---|---|---|---|---|---|---|---|---|---|---|---|---|---|---|---|---|---|---|---|
| 14 | 13 | 0 | 1 | 39 | 6 | +33 | 39 | 7 | 0 | 0 | 21 | 3 | +18 | 6 | 0 | 1 | 18 | 3 | +15 |

Source: see below

==== Results ====
| 7 August 1955 1 | Langevåg | 0 – 5 | Molde | Langevåg |
| | | | K. Elvsaas; K. Elvsaas; K. Elvsaas; Årøe; Årøe |

| 13 August 1955 2 | Molde | 5 – 0 | Clausenengen | Molde |
| | K. Elvsaas; K. Elvsaas; K. Elvsaas; Årøe; Årøe | | | Stadium: Rivalbanen |

| 21 August 1955 3 | Molde | 4 – 1 | Træff | Molde |
| | K. Elvsaas; K. Elvsaas; Bugge; Hemnes | | Goal | Stadium: Rivalbanen |

| 28 August 1955 4 | Molde | 1 – 0 | Kristiansund | Molde |
| | Hemnes 34' | | | Stadium: Molde Stadion; Attendance: 2,500 |

| 4 September 1955 5 | Molde | 2 – 0 | Hødd | Molde |
| | K. Elvsaas; K. Elvsaas | | | Stadium: Molde Stadion |

| 17 September 1955 6 | Braatt | 0 – 2 | Molde | Kristiansund |
| | | | K. Elvsaas; Hemnes |

| 25 September 1955 7 | Aalesund | 0 – 1 | Molde | Ålesund |
| | | | Bugge 30' | Stadium: Aksla Stadion; Attendance: 1,000 |

| 1955 8 | Molde | 5 – 2 | Langevåg | Molde |
| | K. Elvsaas 9'; K. Elvsaas 12'; K. Elvsaas; Hemnes; Bugge | | Salen 12' | Stadium: Molde Stadion |

| 8 October 1955 9 | Clausenengen | 1 – 3 | Molde | Kristiansund |
| | Goal | | K. Elvsaas; Hemnes; Bugge |

| 1956 10 | Kristiansund | 1 – 0 | Molde | Kristiansund |
| | Goal | | | Attendance: 2,000 |

| 13 May 1956 11 | Hødd | 1 – 3 | Molde | Ulsteinvik |
| | Goal | | K. Elvsaas; K. Elvsaas; Årøe |

| May 1956 12 | Træff | 0 – 4 | Molde | Molde |
| | | | Sandhaug; Hemnes; Mjåseth; K. Elvsaas | Attendance: 400 |

| 19 May 1956 13 | Molde | 3 – 0 | Braatt | Molde |
| | Bugge; A. Legernes pen.' K. Elvsaas | | | Stadium: Rivalbanen |

| 27 May 1956 14 | Molde | 1 – 0 | Aalesund | Molde |
| | K. Elvsaas 30' | | | Stadium: Rivalbanen |

==== Table ====
| Pos | Team | Pld | W | D | L | GF | GA | GD | Pts | Qualification or relegation |
|---|---|---|---|---|---|---|---|---|---|---|
| 1 | Molde | 14 | 13 | 0 | 1 | 39 | 6 | +33 | 26 | Qualification for promotion play-offs |
| 2 | Kristiansund | 14 | 11 | 1 | 2 | 40 | 16 | +24 | 23 | |
| 3 | Langevåg | 14 | 7 | 2 | 5 | 37 | 27 | +10 | 16 | |
| 4 | Hødd | 14 | 6 | 1 | 7 | 27 | 23 | +4 | 13 | |
| 5 | Aalesund | 14 | 3 | 4 | 7 | 20 | 23 | −3 | 10 | |
| 6 | Braatt | 14 | 4 | 2 | 8 | 21 | 37 | −16 | 10 | |
| 7 | Clausenengen | 14 | 3 | 1 | 10 | 20 | 38 | −18 | 7 | Relegation |
| 8 | Træff | 14 | 3 | 1 | 10 | 15 | 49 | −34 | 7 | Relegation |

Source: RSSSF

=== Promotion play-offs ===
| 3 June 1956 1st Leg | Molde | 2 – 4 | Steinkjer | Molde |
| | Eikrem; A. Legernes | | Goal | Stadium: Molde Stadion; Attendance: 3,200; Referee: Borgersen, Mercantile |

| 10 June 1956 2nd Leg | Steinkjer | 2 – 3 (7–4 agg.) | Molde | Steinkjer |
| | Dybwad; Kotte | | Eikrem; Lange | Stadium: Guldbergaunet Stadion; Attendance: 6,000 |

=== 1956 Norwegian Cup ===
| 6 June 1956 First round | Molde | 2 – 1 (a.e.t.) | Træff | Molde |
| | K. Elvsaas; K. Elvsaas | | Goal | Stadium: Rivalbanen; Attendance: 400 |

| 17 June 1956 Second Round | Langevåg | 2 – 4 (a.e.t.) | Molde | Langevåg |
| | Goal | | Sandhaug |

| 1956 Third Round | Molde | 2 – 2 (a.e.t.) | Sparta | Molde |
| | K. Elvsaas; A. Legernes 68' (pen.) | | 30' | Stadium: Molde Stadion; Attendance: 3,000 |

| 1956 Third Round Replay | Sparta | 1 – 0 | Molde | Sarpsborg |
| | Goal |

== Season statistics ==
=== Appearances and goals ===
- 3 of 4 goals from Molde's Norwegian Cup second round game against Langevåg lacks information about goal scorer.

| No. | Pos | Nat | Player | Total | | League | | Cup | | Play-offs | |
| No. | Pos | Nat | Player | Apps | Goals | Apps | Goals | Apps | Goals | Apps | Goals |
|---|---|---|---|---|---|---|---|---|---|---|---|
| | GK | (Norway) NOR | Sigurd Moe | 20 | 0 | 14 | 0 | 4 | 0 | 2 | 0 |
| | GK | (Norway) NOR | Petter Pettersson | 1 | 0 | 0 | 0 | 0+1 | 0 | 0 | 0 |
| | DF | (Norway) NOR | Harry Elvsaas | 1 | 0 | 1 | 0 | 0 | 0 | 0 | 0 |
| | DF | (Norway) NOR | Tor Hammervold | 15 | 0 | 10 | 0 | 3 | 0 | 2 | 0 |
| | DF | (Norway) NOR | Monrad Lange | 17 | 0 | 12 | 0 | 3 | 0 | 2 | 0 |
| | DF | (Norway) NOR | Terje Mjåseth | 20 | 1 | 14 | 1 | 4 | 0 | 2 | 0 |
| | DF | (Norway) NOR | Ulf Møller | 11 | 0 | 5 | 0 | 4 | 0 | 2 | 0 |
| | DF | (Norway) NOR | Ulf Myhre | 15 | 0 | 9 | 0 | 4 | 0 | 2 | 0 |
| | DF | (Norway) NOR | Kjell Sandberg | 18 | 0 | 13 | 0 | 3 | 0 | 2 | 0 |
| | MF | (Norway) NOR | Magnar Bugge | 13 | 5 | 11 | 5 | 2 | 0 | 0 | 0 |
| | MF | (Norway) NOR | Rolf Huseby | 4 | 0 | 4 | 0 | 0 | 0 | 0 | 0 |
| | MF | (Norway) NOR | Arne Legernes | 11 | 3 | 5 | 1 | 4 | 1 | 2 | 1 |
| | MF | (Norway) NOR | Bjørn Legernes | 4 | 0 | 4 | 0 | 0 | 0 | 0 | 0 |
| | MF | (Norway) NOR | Lars Lie | 1 | 0 | 1 | 0 | 0 | 0 | 0 | 0 |
| | MF | (Norway) NOR | K. Samuelsen | 1 | 0 | 1 | 0 | 0 | 0 | 0 | 0 |
| | MF | (Norway) NOR | Per Sandhaug | 13 | 2 | 7 | 1 | 3+1 | 1 | 2 | 0 |
| | FW | (Norway) NOR | Magnar Årøe | 20 | 5 | 14 | 5 | 4 | 0 | 2 | 0 |
| | FW | (Norway) NOR | Aslak Eikrem | 9 | 2 | 3 | 0 | 4 | 0 | 2 | 2 |
| | FW | (Norway) NOR | Kåre Elvsaas | 20 | 23 | 14 | 20 | 4 | 3 | 2 | 0 |
| | FW | (Norway) NOR | Arne Hemnes | 12 | 6 | 12 | 6 | 0 | 0 | 0 | 0 |
| | FW | (Norway) NOR | Arnvid Sannes | 2 | 0 | 0 | 0 | 2 | 0 | 0 | 0 |

=== Goal scorers ===
- 3 of 4 goals from Molde's Norwegian Cup second round game against Langevåg lacks information about goal scorer.

| Rank | Nat. | Player | League | Cup | Play-offs | Total |
|---|---|---|---|---|---|---|
| 1 | (Norway) | Kåre Elvsaas | 20 | 3 | 0 | 23 |
| 2 | (Norway) | Arne Hemnes | 6 | 0 | 0 | 6 |
| 3 | (Norway) | Magnar Bugge | 5 | 0 | 0 | 6 |
| 3 | (Norway) | Magnar Årøe | 5 | 0 | 0 | 6 |
| 5 | (Norway) | Arne Legernes | 1 | 1 | 1 | 3 |
| 6 | (Norway) | Per Sandhaug | 1 | 1 | 0 | 2 |
| 6 | (Norway) | Aslak Eikrem | 0 | 0 | 2 | 2 |
| 8 | (Norway) | Terje Mjåseth | 1 | 0 | 0 | 1 |
| 8 | (Norway) | Monrad Lange | 0 | 0 | 1 | 1 |
| Unknown | | | 0 | 3 | 0 | 3 |
| TOTALS | | | 39 | 8 | 4 | 51 |

== See also ==
- Molde FK seasons
