= Brakstad =

Brakstad is a Norwegian surname. Notable people with the surname include:

- Erik Brakstad (born 1951), Norwegian soccer player and coach
- Torkild Brakstad (1945–2021), Norwegian soccer player and coach
