= 1951–52 Molde FK season =

Molde
1951–52 season
- Chairman: Ivar Aarøe
- Coach: Ole Silseth
- Stadium: Rivalbanen
- Landsdelsserien (Møre): 6th
- Norwegian Cup: Third round vs Freidig

The 1951–52 season was Molde's 4th consecutive year in the second tier of Norwegian football, their first in Landsdelsserien, which began this season.

This season, Molde competed in the inaugural season of Landsdelsserien and the 1952 Norwegian Cup.

== Squad ==
Note: Flags indicate national team as defined under FIFA eligibility rules; some limited exceptions apply. Players may hold more than one non-FIFA nationality.

No.	Pos.	Nation	Player
—	GK	NOR	Sigurd Moe
—	GK	NOR	Fridtjof Ødegård
—	DF	NOR	Harry Elvsaas
—	DF	NOR	Harry Gjerde
—	DF	NOR	Kåre Harrang
—	DF	NOR	Hans Jacobsen
—	DF	NOR	Tor Hammervoll
—	DF	NOR	Monrad Lange
—	DF	NOR	Terje Mjåseth
—	DF	NOR	Kjell Sandberg
—	DF	NOR	Ole Silseth
—	DF	NOR	Gunnar Talsethagen

No.	Pos.	Nation	Player
—	MF	NOR	Jon Berg
—	MF	NOR	Arne Legernes
—	MF	NOR	Bjørn Legernes
—	MF	NOR	Ivar Melsæther
—	FW	NOR	Birger Arnestad
—	FW	NOR	Kåre Elvsaas
—	FW	NOR	Arne Hemnes
—	FW	NOR	Kåre Holen
—	FW	NOR	Odd Legernes
—	FW	NOR	Ingvar Outzen
—	FW	NOR	Arnvid Sannes
—	FW	NOR	Magnar Årøe

== Friendlies ==
31 May 1951	Molde	1 – 0	Træff	Molde
	Arnestad

8 June 1951	Molde	1 – 0	Træff	Molde
	Hemnes

14 October 1951	Molde	0 – 1	Kristiansund	Molde
			Goal

27 April 1952	Molde	2 – 1	Kleive	Molde
	Goal		Goal

27 April 1952	Molde	2 – 0	Træff	Molde
	Goal

16 May 1952	Molde	6 – 1	Clausenengen
	K. Elvsaas; K. Elvsaas; Holen; A. Legernes; Hemnes; Årøe		Goal

== Competitions ==
=== Landsdelsserien (Møre) ===
==== Results ====
1951 1	Clausenengen	1 – 7	Molde	Kristiansund
	Goal		O. Legernes; O. Legernes; O. Legernes; O. Legernes; Sannes; B. Legernes; Melsæther

1951 2	Rollon	1 – 0	Molde	Ålesund
	Goal

1951 3	Molde	1 – 2	Langevåg	Molde
	Goal		Goal

1951 4	Hødd	1 – 0	Molde	Ulsteinvik
	Goal

1951 5	Kristiansund	1 – 2	Molde	Kristiansund
	Goal		Goal

2 September 1951 6	Molde	0 – 1	Aalesund	Molde
			Goal	Stadium: Molde Stadion; Attendance: 600

8 September 1951 7	Braatt	0 – 2	Molde	Kristiansund
			O. Legernes; Arnestad

23 September 1951 8	Molde	2 – 4	Rollon	Molde
	Goal		Goal	Stadium: Molde Stadion

29 April 1952 9	Molde	2 – 3	Clausenengen	Molde
	K. Elvsaas o.g.'		Goal	Stadium: Molde Stadion

4 May 1952 10	Langevåg	2 – 1	Molde	Langevåg
	Goal		A. Legernes pen.'

11 May 1952 11	Molde	2 – 3	Hødd	Molde
	Goal		Goal	Stadium: Molde Stadion; Attendance: 400

25 May 1952 12	Molde	3 – 2	Kristiansund	Molde
	Årøe; Årøe; Holen		Goal	Stadium: Molde Stadion; Attendance: 400

June 1952 13	Aalesund	0 – 1	Molde	Ålesund
			A. Legernes pen.'

8 June 1952 14	Molde	0 – 0	Braatt	Molde

==== Table ====
Pos	Team	Pld	W	D	L	GF	GA	GD	Pts	Qualification or relegation
1	Hødd	14	7	4	3	36	28	+8	18	Qualification for promotion play-offs
2	Aalesund	14	8	2	4	20	14	+6	18	
3	Langevåg	14	7	3	4	33	25	+8	17	
4	Kristiansund	14	6	2	6	39	41	−2	14	
5	Clausenengen	14	4	4	6	26	36	−10	12	
6	Molde	14	5	1	8	23	20	+3	11	
7	Braatt	14	2	7	5	23	28	−5	11	Relegation
8	Rollon	14	4	3	7	22	30	−8	11	Relegation

Source: RSSSF

=== 1952 Norwegian Cup ===
Molde qualified for the 1952 Norwegian Cup by defeating Veblungsnes in the qualifying round. By defeating Hødd in the second round, Molde reached the third round of the Norwegian Cup for the first time in club history.

22 May 1952 First qualifying round	Molde	5 – 1	Veblungsnes
	Goal		Goal

15 June 1952 First Round	Molde	5 – 0	Clausenengen	Molde
	K. Elvsaas; K. Elvsaas; Årøe; Holen; A. Legernes			Stadium: Molde Stadion

1952 Second Round	Molde	5 – 1	Hødd	Molde
	K. Elvsaas; K. Elvsaas; K. Elvsaas; Lange; Lange		Goal	Stadium: Rivalbanen

27 July 1952 Third Round	Freidig	5 – 2	Molde	Trondheim
	Goal		Goal	Stadium: Lerkendal Stadion

== Season statistics ==
=== Appearances ===
Name	Nationality	Position	League	Cup	Total
Birger Arnestad	Norway	FW	7	4	11
Magnar Årøe	Norway	FW	3	4	7
Jon Berg	Norway	MF	7	0	7
Harry Gjerde	Norway	DF	6	0	6
Tor Hammervoll	Norway	DF	3	1	4
Kåre Harrang	Norway	DF	8	0	8
Arne Hemnes	Norway	FW	13	4	17
Kåre Holen	Norway	FW	5	2	7
Hans Jacobsen	Norway	DF	8	0	8
Harry Elvsaas	Norway	DF	1	0	1
Kåre Elvsaas	Norway	FW	5	4	9
Monrad Lange	Norway	DF	13	2	15
Arne Legernes	Norway	MF	9	4	13
Bjørn Legernes	Norway	MF	6	1	7
Odd Legernes	Norway	FW	8	1	9
Ivar Melsæther	Norway	MF	2	0	2
Terje Mjåseth	Norway	DF	13	4	17
Sigurd Moe	Norway	GK	10	4	14
Ingvar Outzen	Norway	FW	1	0	1
Kjell Sandberg	Norway	DF	3	3	6
Arnvid Sannes	Norway	FW	14	4	18
Ole Silseth	Norway	DF	2	0	2
Gunnar Talsethagen	Norway	DF	3	0	3
Fridtjof Ødegård	Norway	GK	4	0	4

== See also ==
- Molde FK seasons
