= 1955 in Norwegian football =

Football in Norway
- Season: 1955

Men's football
- Hovedserien: Larvik Turn
- Landsdelsserien: Rapid (Group East/South); Frigg (Group East/North); Jerv (Group South/West A1); Bryne (Group South/West A2); Varegg (Group South/West B); Kristiansund (Group Møre); Kvik (Group Trøndelag)
- NM: Skeid

The 1955 season was the 50th season of competitive football in Norway.

== Hovedserien 1954/55 ==
=== Group A ===
Pos	Team	Pld	W	D	L	GF	GA	GD	Pts	Qualification or relegation
1	Fredrikstad	14	7	5	2	43	24	+19	19	Qualification for the championship final
2	Viking	14	6	3	5	23	24	−1	15	
3	Odd	14	6	3	5	20	25	−5	15	
4	Vålerengen	14	4	6	4	22	21	+1	14	
5	Brann	14	5	4	5	23	24	−1	14	
6	Lillestrøm	14	6	2	6	27	30	−3	14	
7	Fram Larvik (R)	14	6	1	7	21	24	−3	13	Relegation
8	Sparta (R)	14	1	6	7	21	28	−7	8	Relegation

Source: RSSSF
(R) Relegated

=== Group B ===
Pos	Team	Pld	W	D	L	GF	GA	GD	Pts	Qualification or relegation
1	Larvik Turn (C)	14	10	1	3	40	16	+24	21	Qualification for the championship final
2	Skeid	14	9	1	4	34	22	+12	19	
3	Sandefjord BK	14	8	3	3	26	23	+3	19	
4	Asker	14	7	2	5	27	20	+7	16	
5	Sarpsborg FK	14	5	4	5	27	33	−6	14	
6	Ranheim	14	4	2	8	20	29	−9	10	
7	Strømmen (R)	14	2	3	9	22	27	−5	7	Relegation
8	Freidig (R)	14	2	2	10	13	39	−26	6	Relegation

Source: RSSSF
(C) Champions; (R) Relegated

=== Championship final ===
June 5: Larvik Turn - Fredrikstad 4–2

== Landsdelsserien 1954/55 ==
=== Group Østland/Søndre ===
Pos	Team	Pld	W	D	L	GF	GA	GD	Pts	Promotion or relegation
1	Rapid (P)	14	8	3	3	27	20	+7	19	Promotion to Hovedserien
2	Snøgg	14	6	5	3	27	19	+8	17	
3	Moss	14	6	3	5	36	22	+14	15	
4	Pors	14	5	5	4	28	27	+1	15	
5	Ørn	14	6	2	6	27	29	−2	14	
6	Eik (R)	14	4	5	5	28	28	0	13	Relegation to 3. divisjon
7	Askim (R)	14	3	4	7	16	31	−15	10	Relegation to 3. divisjon
8	Tønsberg Turn (R)	14	3	3	8	16	29	−13	9	Relegation to 3. divisjon

Source: rsssf.no
Rules for classification: 1) points; 2) goal difference; 3) number of goals scored.
(P) Promoted; (R) Relegated

=== Group Østland/Nordre ===
Pos	Team	Pld	W	D	L	GF	GA	GD	Pts	Promotion or relegation
1	Frigg (P)	14	10	3	1	33	12	+21	23	Promotion to Hovedserien
2	Kapp	14	7	3	4	34	28	+6	17	
3	Raufoss	14	7	1	6	25	20	+5	15	
4	Lyn	14	5	5	4	20	20	0	15	
5	Vestfossen	14	6	2	6	21	27	−6	14	
6	Gjøvik-Lyn	14	5	2	7	16	22	−6	12	
7	Hamarkameratene (R)	14	4	2	8	17	24	−7	10	Relegation to 3. divisjon
8	Geithus (R)	14	2	2	10	18	31	−13	6	Relegation to 3. divisjon

Source: rsssf.no
Rules for classification: 1) points; 2) goal difference; 3) number of goals scored.
(P) Promoted; (R) Relegated

=== Group Sørland/Vestland, A1 ===
Pos	Team	Pld	W	D	L	GF	GA	GD	Pts	Qualification or relegation
1	Jerv	12	9	0	3	39	18	+21	18	Qualification for the promotion play-offs
2	Start	12	8	1	3	36	19	+17	17	
3	Flekkefjord	12	7	2	3	30	18	+12	16	
4	Donn	12	7	0	5	30	21	+9	14	
5	Sørfjell	12	5	2	5	16	29	−13	12	
6	Grane	12	1	2	9	14	28	−14	4	
7	AIK Lund (R)	12	1	1	10	11	43	−32	3	Relegation to 3. divisjon

Source: rsssf.no
Rules for classification: 1) points; 2) goal difference; 3) number of goals scored.
(R) Relegated

=== Group Sørland/Vestland, A2 ===
Pos	Team	Pld	W	D	L	GF	GA	GD	Pts	Qualification or relegation
1	Bryne	14	10	1	3	41	18	+23	21	Qualification for the promotion play-offs
2	Ulf	14	7	4	3	23	18	+5	18	
3	Vard	14	5	3	6	27	21	+6	13	
4	Stavanger	14	6	1	7	27	26	+1	13	
5	Djerv 1919	14	6	1	7	21	27	−6	13	
6	Vidar	14	5	2	7	24	35	−11	12	
7	Ålgård (R)	14	5	1	8	27	32	−5	11	Relegation to 3. divisjon
8	Nærbø (R)	14	4	3	7	25	38	−13	11	Relegation to 3. divisjon

Source: rsssf.no
Rules for classification: 1) points; 2) goal difference; 3) number of goals scored.
(R) Relegated

=== Group Sørland/Vestland, B ===
Pos	Team	Pld	W	D	L	GF	GA	GD	Pts	Qualification or relegation
1	Varegg (O, P)	12	5	5	2	25	13	+12	15	Qualification for the promotion play-offs
2	Baune	12	4	4	4	20	18	+2	12	
3	Årstad	12	6	0	6	20	19	+1	12	
4	Djerv	12	5	2	5	23	25	−2	12	
5	Os	12	3	5	4	29	32	−3	11	
6	Nymark	12	4	3	5	19	23	−4	11	
7	Nordnes	12	5	1	6	16	22	−6	11	

Source: rsssf.no
Rules for classification: 1) points; 2) goal difference; 3) number of goals scored.
(O) Play-off winners; (P) Promoted

=== Group Møre ===
Pos	Team	Pld	W	D	L	GF	GA	GD	Pts	Qualification or relegation
1	Kristiansund	14	10	2	2	35	15	+20	22	Qualification for the promotion play-offs
2	Hødd	14	8	3	3	33	19	+14	19	
3	Aalesund	14	5	4	5	25	24	+1	14	
4	Langevåg	14	5	4	5	25	30	−5	14	
5	Molde	14	4	5	5	26	18	+8	13	
6	Clausenengen	14	5	3	6	25	25	0	13	
7	Rollon (R)	14	5	1	8	20	37	−17	11	Relegation to 3. divisjon
8	Sykkylven (R)	14	2	2	10	20	41	−21	6	Relegation to 3. divisjon

Source: rsssf.no
Rules for classification: 1) points; 2) goal difference; 3) number of goals scored.
(R) Relegated

=== Group Trøndelag ===
Pos	Team	Pld	W	D	L	GF	GA	GD	Pts	Qualification or relegation
1	Kvik (O, P)	14	10	2	2	31	11	+20	22	Qualification for the promotion play-offs
2	Sverre	14	8	0	6	40	25	+15	16	
3	Brage	14	6	3	5	37	28	+9	15	
4	Falken	14	6	2	6	22	29	−7	14	
5	Rosenborg	14	6	1	7	28	24	+4	13	
6	Steinkjer	14	5	2	7	33	38	−5	12	
7	Verdal (R)	14	5	2	7	19	26	−7	12	Relegation to 3. divisjon
8	Neset (R)	14	3	2	9	16	45	−29	8	Relegation to 3. divisjon

Source: rsssf.no
Rules for classification: 1) points; 2) goal difference; 3) number of goals scored.
(O) Play-off winners; (P) Promoted; (R) Relegated

=== Play-off Sørland/Vestland ===
- Jerv - Bryne 2-2 (extra time)
- Bryne - Jerv 2–1
- Bryne - Varegg 2–3

Varegg promoted.

=== Play-off Møre/Trøndelag ===
- Kvik - Kristiansund 4–0
- Kristiansund - Kvik 2-1 (agg. 2–5)

Kvik (Trondheim) promoted.

== First Division 1954/55 ==
=== District I ===
1. Greåker (Promoted)
2. Selbak
3. Lisleby
4. Tune
5. Torp
6. Hafslund
7. Mysen
8. Tistedalen

=== District II, Group A ===
1. Drafn (Play-off)
2. Mjøndalen
3. Spartacus
4. Solberg
5. Grüner
6. Jevnaker
7. Stabæk
8. Hard

=== District II, Group B ===
1. Aurskog (Play-off)
2. Sagene
3. Aasen
4. Sandaker
5. Steinberg
6. Grue
7. Drammens BK
8. Birkebeineren

=== District III ===
1. Hamar IL (Play-off)
2. Vang
3. Gjøvik SK
4. Fremad
5. Mesna
6. Vardal
7. Brumunddal
8. Storhamar

=== District IV, Group A ===
1. Sem (Play-off)
2. Borg
3. Storm
4. Brevik
5. Kragerø
6. Holmestrand
7. Borre
8. Stag

=== District IV, Group B ===
1. Herkules (Play-off)
2. Skiens BK
3. Urædd
4. Ulefoss
5. Drangedal
6. Rjukan
7. Fossum (Skien)
8. Sp.klubben 31

=== District V, Group A1 (Aust-Agder) ===
1. Nedenes (Play-off)
2. Rygene
3. Risør
4. Arendals BK
5. Trauma
Lillesand (withdrew)

=== District V, Group A2 (Vest-Agder) ===
1. Vigør (Play-off)
2. Mandalskam.
3. Vindbjart
4. Farsund
5. Torridal
6. Lyngdal

=== District V, group B1 (Rogaland) ===
1. Varhaug (Promoted)
2. Jarl
3. Klepp
4. Vaulen
5. Egersund
6. Ganddal

=== District V, Group B2 (Rogaland) ===
1. Kopervik (Promoted)
2. Buøy
3. Torvastad
4. Haugar
5. Randaberg
6. Sauda

=== District VI, Group A (Bergen) ===
1. Fjellkameratene (Play-off)
2. Sandviken
3. Trane
4. Hardy
5. Laksevåg
6. Minde
7. Bergens-Sparta

=== District VI, Group B (Midthordland) ===
1. Fana (Play-off)
2. Voss
3. Erdal
4. Ålvik
5. Fyllingen
6. Florvåg
7. Eidsvåg (Åsane)

=== District VII, Group A (Sunnmøre) ===
1. Herd (Play-off)
2. Ørsta
3. Aksla
4. Volda
5. Skarbøvik
6. Hovdebygda
7. Spjelkavik
8. Stranda

=== District VII, Group B (Romsdal) ===
1. Træff (Play-off)
2. Isfjorden
3. Kleive
4. Eide
5. Åndalsnes
6. Olymp
7. Frode

=== District VII, Group C (Nordmøre) ===
1. Braatt (Play-off)
2. Halsa
3. Dahle
4. Enge
5. Sunndal
6. Goma
7. Nordlandet
8. Averøykam.

=== District VIII, Group A1 (Sør-Trøndelag) ===
1. Hommelvik (Play-off)
2. Heimdal
3. Flå
4. Steinar
5. Leik
6. Børsa

=== District VIII, Group A2 (Sør-Trøndelag) ===
1. Troll (Play-off)
2. Løkken
3. Orkanger
4. Svorkmo
5. Rindal
6. Dalguten

=== District VIII, Group B (Trondheim og omegn) ===
1. Wing (Play-off)
2. National
3. Tryggkameratene
4. Trond
5. Ørn (Trondheim)
6. Nidar
7. NTHI
Nidelv withdrew

=== District VIII, Group C (Fosen) ===
1. Opphaug (Play-off)
2. Stadsbygd
3. Beian
4. Rissa
5. Uthaug
Lensvik disqualified

=== District VIII, Group D (Nord-Trøndelag/Namdal) ===
1. Stjørdal (Play-off)
2. Malm
3. Nessegutten
4. Namsos
5. Blink
6. Varden (Meråker)
7. Skogn
8. Bangsund

=== District IX ===
1. Bodø/Glimt
2. Brønnøysund
3. Saltdalkam.
4. Mo
5. Grand
6. Stålkameratene

=== District X (Unofficial) ===
1. Harstad
2. Narvik/Nor
3. Tromsø
4. Mjølner
5. Finnsnes

=== Play-off District II/III ===
Drafn - Aurskog 2-2
Aurskog - Hamar 1–2
Hamar - Drafn 1–1

=== Table ===
Pos	Team	Pld	W	D	L	GF	GA	GD	Pts	Promotion
1	Hamar IL	2	1	1	0	3	2	+1	3	Promoted
2	Drafn	2	0	2	0	3	3	0	2	Promoted
3	Aurskog	2	0	1	1	3	4	−1	1	

=== Championship District II ===
Aurskog - Drafn 3–2

=== Play-off District IV ===
Herkules - Sem 1–0
Sem - Herkules 0-1 (agg. 0–2)

Herkules promoted

=== Play-off District V ===
Vigør - Nedenes 1–2
Nedenes - Vigør 3-1 (agg. 5–2)

Nedenes promoted.

=== Championship District V ===
Varhaug - Kopervik 2-2
Kopervik - Varhaug 0-2 (agg. 2–4)
Nedenes - Varhaug 0–5

=== Play-off District VI ===
Fana - Fjellkameratene 4–1
Fjellkameratene - Fana 1–3

Fana promoted

=== Play-off District VII ===
Træff - Braatt 5–2
Herd - Træff 0–2
Braatt - Herd 4–2

=== Table ===
Pos	Team	Pld	W	D	L	GF	GA	GD	Pts	Promotion
1	Træff	2	2	0	0	7	2	+5	4	Promoted
2	Braatt	2	1	0	1	6	7	−1	2	Promoted
3	Herd	2	0	0	2	2	6	−4	0	

=== Play-off District VIII ===
Hommelvik - Stjørdal 1–2
Stjørdal - Wing 1–2
Wing - Hommelvik 1–0

=== Table ===
Pos	Team	Pld	W	D	L	GF	GA	GD	Pts	Promotion
1	Wing	2	2	0	0	3	1	+2	4	Promoted
2	Stjørdal	2	1	0	1	3	3	0	2	Promoted
3	Hommelvik	2	0	0	2	1	3	−2	0	

4. Opphaug withdrew

=== Relegation play-off District IV ===
Holmestrand-Rjukan 1–3

Holmestrand relegated

== Norwegian Cup ==
=== Final ===
23 October 1955

Skeid	5–0	Lillestrøm
Hennum 1', 15'; Farem 50', 76', 84'	Report

Ullevaal Stadion, Oslo
Attendance: 33,825
Referee: Henry Klausen (Sarpsborg)

== Northern Norwegian Cup ==
=== Final ===
Harstad	1–0	Bodø/Glimt
	Report

== National team ==
Date	Venue	Opponent	Res.*	Comp.	Norwegian goalscorers
May 8	Oslo	Hungary	0 - 5	F	
May 25	Bislett Stadion, Oslo	Republic of Ireland	1 - 3	F	Arne Kotte
June 12	Oslo	Romania	0 - 1	F	
August 14	Helsinki	Finland	3 - 1	F	Harry Kure, Harald Hennum (2)
September 11	Oslo	Denmark	1 - 1	F	
September 25	Stockholm	Sweden	1 - 1	F	Arne Kotte
November 6	Amsterdam	Netherlands	0 - 3	F	
November 16	Karlsruhe	West Germany	0 - 2	F	

Note: Norway's goals first
Explanation:

- F = Friendly
