= Henry Källgren =

Swedish footballer

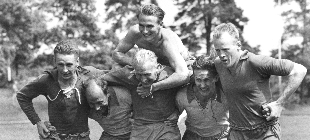
- Kurt Hamrin (on top), Reino Börjesson, Gunnar Gren, Bengt Berndtsson, Henry Källgren and Bror Mellberg (from left to right) with Team Sweden during a camp in preparation for the 1958 FIFA World Cup in Sweden

Personal information
- Date of birth: 13 March 1931
- Place of birth: Norrköping, Sweden
- Date of death: 21 January 2005 (aged 73)
- Place of death: Helsingborg, Sweden
- Position: Striker

Youth career
- Norrköpings FF

Senior career*
Years	Team	Apps	(Gls)
1951–1960	IFK Norrköping	181	(126)
1960–1963	Norrby IF		

International career
1953–1958	Sweden	8	(8)
- * Club domestic league appearances and goals

Henry Källgren (13 March 1931 – 21 January 2005) was a Swedish footballer who played at both professional and international levels as a striker.

== Career ==
=== Club career ===
Källgren played club football for IFK Norrköping between 1951 and 1960, scoring a total of 126 goals in 181 games. In 1960 Källgren made a controversial move to Norrby IF where he played for 3 seasons before retiring from football in 1963.

=== International career ===
Källgren represented the national team at the 1958 FIFA World Cup, and earned a total of eight caps between 1953 and 1958.
