= 1954–55 Landsdelsserien =

Norwegian football league season

Landsdelsserien
- Season: 1954–55
- Promoted: Rapid; Frigg; Varegg; Kvik
- Relegated: Eik; Askim; Tønsberg; Hamarkameratene; Geithus; AIK Lund; Ålgård; Nærbø; Rollon; Sykkylven; Verdal; Neset

The 1954–55 Landsdelsserien was a Norwegian second-tier football league season.

The league was contested by 54 teams, divided into a total of seven groups from four districts; Østland/Søndre, Østland/Nordre, Sørland/Vestre and Møre/Trøndelag. The two group winners in the Østland districts, Rapid and Frigg promoted directly to the 1955–56 Hovedserien. The other five group winners qualified for promotion play-offs to compete for two spots in the following season's top flight. Varegg and Kvik won the play-offs and were promoted.

== Tables ==
=== District Østland/Søndre ===
Pos	Team	Pld	W	D	L	GF	GA	GD	Pts	Promotion or relegation
1	Rapid (P)	14	8	3	3	27	20	+7	19	Promotion to Hovedserien
2	Snøgg	14	6	5	3	27	19	+8	17	
3	Moss	14	6	3	5	36	22	+14	15	
4	Pors	14	5	5	4	28	27	+1	15	
5	Ørn	14	6	2	6	27	29	−2	14	
6	Eik (R)	14	4	5	5	28	28	0	13	Relegation to 3. divisjon
7	Askim (R)	14	3	4	7	16	31	−15	10	Relegation to 3. divisjon
8	Tønsberg Turn (R)	14	3	3	8	16	29	−13	9	Relegation to 3. divisjon

Source: rsssf.no
Rules for classification: 1) points; 2) goal difference; 3) number of goals scored.
(P) Promoted; (R) Relegated

=== District Østland/Nordre ===
Pos	Team	Pld	W	D	L	GF	GA	GD	Pts	Promotion or relegation
1	Frigg (P)	14	10	3	1	33	12	+21	23	Promotion to Hovedserien
2	Kapp	14	7	3	4	34	28	+6	17	
3	Raufoss	14	7	1	6	25	20	+5	15	
4	Lyn	14	5	5	4	20	20	0	15	
5	Vestfossen	14	6	2	6	21	27	−6	14	
6	Gjøvik-Lyn	14	5	2	7	16	22	−6	12	
7	Hamarkameratene (R)	14	4	2	8	17	24	−7	10	Relegation to 3. divisjon
8	Geithus (R)	14	2	2	10	18	31	−13	6	Relegation to 3. divisjon

Source: rsssf.no
Rules for classification: 1) points; 2) goal difference; 3) number of goals scored.
(P) Promoted; (R) Relegated

=== District Sørland/Vestland ===
==== Group A1 ====
Pos	Team	Pld	W	D	L	GF	GA	GD	Pts	Qualification or relegation
1	Jerv	12	9	0	3	39	18	+21	18	Qualification for the promotion play-offs
2	Start	12	8	1	3	36	19	+17	17	
3	Flekkefjord	12	7	2	3	30	18	+12	16	
4	Donn	12	7	0	5	30	21	+9	14	
5	Sørfjell	12	5	2	5	16	29	−13	12	
6	Grane	12	1	2	9	14	28	−14	4	
7	AIK Lund (R)	12	1	1	10	11	43	−32	3	Relegation to 3. divisjon

Source: rsssf.no
Rules for classification: 1) points; 2) goal difference; 3) number of goals scored.
(R) Relegated

==== Group A2 ====
Pos	Team	Pld	W	D	L	GF	GA	GD	Pts	Qualification or relegation
1	Bryne	14	10	1	3	41	18	+23	21	Qualification for the promotion play-offs
2	Ulf	14	7	4	3	23	18	+5	18	
3	Vard	14	5	3	6	27	21	+6	13	
4	Stavanger	14	6	1	7	27	26	+1	13	
5	Djerv 1919	14	6	1	7	21	27	−6	13	
6	Vidar	14	5	2	7	24	35	−11	12	
7	Ålgård (R)	14	5	1	8	27	32	−5	11	Relegation to 3. divisjon
8	Nærbø (R)	14	4	3	7	25	38	−13	11	Relegation to 3. divisjon

Source: rsssf.no
Rules for classification: 1) points; 2) goal difference; 3) number of goals scored.
(R) Relegated

==== Group B ====
Pos	Team	Pld	W	D	L	GF	GA	GD	Pts	Qualification or relegation
1	Varegg (O, P)	12	5	5	2	25	13	+12	15	Qualification for the promotion play-offs
2	Baune	12	4	4	4	20	18	+2	12	
3	Årstad	12	6	0	6	20	19	+1	12	
4	Djerv	12	5	2	5	23	25	−2	12	
5	Os	12	3	5	4	29	32	−3	11	
6	Nymark	12	4	3	5	19	23	−4	11	
7	Nordnes	12	5	1	6	16	22	−6	11	

Source: rsssf.no
Rules for classification: 1) points; 2) goal difference; 3) number of goals scored.
(O) Play-off winners; (P) Promoted

=== District Møre/Trøndelag ===
==== Møre ====
Pos	Team	Pld	W	D	L	GF	GA	GD	Pts	Qualification or relegation
1	Kristiansund	14	10	2	2	35	15	+20	22	Qualification for the promotion play-offs
2	Hødd	14	8	3	3	33	19	+14	19	
3	Aalesund	14	5	4	5	25	24	+1	14	
4	Langevåg	14	5	4	5	25	30	−5	14	
5	Molde	14	4	5	5	26	18	+8	13	
6	Clausenengen	14	5	3	6	25	25	0	13	
7	Rollon (R)	14	5	1	8	20	37	−17	11	Relegation to 3. divisjon
8	Sykkylven (R)	14	2	2	10	20	41	−21	6	Relegation to 3. divisjon

Source: rsssf.no
Rules for classification: 1) points; 2) goal difference; 3) number of goals scored.
(R) Relegated

==== Trøndelag ====
Pos	Team	Pld	W	D	L	GF	GA	GD	Pts	Qualification or relegation
1	Kvik (O, P)	14	10	2	2	31	11	+20	22	Qualification for the promotion play-offs
2	Sverre	14	8	0	6	40	25	+15	16	
3	Brage	14	6	3	5	37	28	+9	15	
4	Falken	14	6	2	6	22	29	−7	14	
5	Rosenborg	14	6	1	7	28	24	+4	13	
6	Steinkjer	14	5	2	7	33	38	−5	12	
7	Verdal (R)	14	5	2	7	19	26	−7	12	Relegation to 3. divisjon
8	Neset (R)	14	3	2	9	16	45	−29	8	Relegation to 3. divisjon

Source: rsssf.no
Rules for classification: 1) points; 2) goal difference; 3) number of goals scored.
(O) Play-off winners; (P) Promoted; (R) Relegated

== Promotion play-offs ==
Sørland/Vestland
Results A1–A2

- Jerv 2–2 (a.e.t.) Bryne
- Bryne 2–1 Jerv

Results A–B

- Bryne 2–3 Varegg

Varegg won 3–2 over Bryne and were promoted to Hovedserien.

Møre/Trøndelag

- Kvik 4–0 Kristiansund
- Kristiansund 2–1 Kvik

Kvik won 5–2 on aggregate and were promoted to Hovedserien.
