= 1956 Norwegian Football Cup =

Norgesmesterskapet i fotball for menn 1956

Tournament details
- Country: Norway
- Teams: 128 (main competition)

Final positions
- Champions: Skeid (4th title)
- Runners-up: Larvik Turn

The 1956 Norwegian Football Cup was the 51st season of the Norwegian annual knockout football tournament. The tournament was open for all members of NFF, except those from Northern Norway. The final was played at Ullevaal Stadion in Oslo on 21 October 1956, and was contested the defending champions Skeid, and Larvik Turn who contested their first final. Skeid successfully defended their title with a 5–0 victory in the final.

== First round ==
| Team 1 | Score | Team 2 |
|---|---|---|
| Asker | 5–0 | Aasen |
| Aurskog | 3–6 | Lyn |
| Bjørkelangen | 1–2 | Strømmen |
| Brann | 3–1 | Djerv |
| Brevik | 0–5 | Borg |
| Buøy | 1–0 | Stavanger |
| Clausenengen | 1–2 | Braatt |
| Djerv 1919 | 4–1 | Kopervik |
| Donn | 3–1 | Nedenes |
| Drafn | 1–2 | Kongsberg |
| Eik | 3–1 | Drammens BK |
| Falk | 2–3 | Mjøndalen |
| Flekkefjord | 0–2 (a.e.t.) | Bryne |
| Florø | 1–2 | Langevåg |
| Freidig | 3–1 | Nessegutten |
| Fremad Lillehammer | 10–0 | Tynset |
| Frigg | 10–1 | Sørli |
| Geithus | 1–0 | Stabæk |
| Gjerpen | 0–4 | Sandefjord BK |
| Gjøvik SK | 2–3 | Vålerengen |
| Grane (Arendal) | 4–3 | Herkules |
| Greåker | 3–1 | Kvik (Halden) |
| Grue | 1–4 | Hamar |
| Grüner | 1–2 | Sagene |
| HamKam | 4–2 | Mesna |
| Hardy | 0–6 | Årstad |
| Hødd | 5–1 | Aalesund |
| Jevnaker | 2–1 | Fram (Larvik) |
| Jotun | 0–2 | Raufoss |
| Kapp | 4–1 | Grei |
| Kragerø | 2–7 | Odd |
| Kristiansund | 5–1 | Dahle |
| Kvik (Trondheim) | 8–1 | Wing |
| Lillestrøm | 11–0 | Einastrand |
| Lisleby | 5–1 | Sandaker |
| Molde | 2–1 (a.e.t.) | Træff |
| National | 1–1 (a.e.t.) | Sverre |
| Nordnes | 3–3 (a.e.t.) | Fjellkameratene |
| Os | 4–0 | Nymark |
| Ranheim | 2–0 | Falken |
| Rapid | 3–0 | Tune |
| Rjukan | 1–2 | Pors |
| Sarpsborg | 4–1 | Mysen |
| Selbak | 5–0 | Spartacus |
| Skeid | 6–1 | Lillestrøm/Fram |
| Ski | 2–5 (a.e.t.) | Sparta |
| Skiens BK | 0–2 | Larvik Turn |
| Snøgg | 5–0 | Tønsberg-Kameratene |
| Steinkjer | 3–1 | Neset |
| Sterling | 1–9 | Moss |
| Stjørdals-Blink | 1–3 | Rosenborg |
| Strømsgodset | 1–0 | Vestfossen |
| Sørfjell | 1–3 | Start |
| Torp | 1–3 | Fredrikstad |
| Tryggkam | 1–4 | Brage |
| Tønsberg Turn | 2–1 | Ulefoss |
| Ulf | 3–2 | Varhaug |
| Urædd | 5–1 | Ørn |
| Vang | 0–3 | Gjøvik-Lyn |
| Varegg | 7–0 | Fana |
| Vidar | 0–4 | Vard |
| Vigør | 1–8 | Jerv |
| Viking | 6–1 | Jarl |
| Voss | 0–1 | Baune |
Replay
| Fjellkameratene | 1–3 | Nordnes |
| Sverre | 3–1 | National |

== Second round ==
| Team 1 | Score | Team 2 |
|---|---|---|
| Baune | 0–0 (a.e.t.) | Djerv 1919 |
| Borg | 1–5 | Snøgg |
| Braatt | 1–6 | Ranheim |
| Brage | 1–1 (a.e.t.) | Freidig |
| Bryne | 0–3 | Viking |
| Fredrikstad | 8–0 | Geithus |
| Gjøvik-Lyn | 0–2 | Asker |
| Hamar | 2–3 (a.e.t.) | Sarpsborg |
| HamKam | 3–2 | Frigg |
| Hødd | 2–1 | Kristiansund |
| Jerv | 2–2 (a.e.t.) | Donn |
| Kongsberg | 3–3 (a.e.t.) | Kapp |
| Langevåg | 2–4 (a.e.t.) | Molde |
| Larvik Turn | 2–1 | Selbak |
| Lyn | 1–7 | Greåker |
| Mjøndalen | 2–1 | Eik |
| Moss | 3–0 | Lillestrøm |
| Odd | 2–1 | Grane (Arendal) |
| Os | 1–6 | Brann |
| Pors | 1–2 | Lisleby |
| Raufoss | 3–2 | Rapid |
| Rosenborg | 2–0 | Steinkjer |
| Sagene | 0–6 | Skeid |
| Sandefjord BK | 5–0 | Jevnaker |
| Sparta | 7–2 | Tønsberg Turn |
| Start | 0–3 | Urædd |
| Strømmen | 8–0 | Strømsgodset |
| Sverre | 1–3 | Kvik (Trondheim) |
| Ulf | 4–0 | Buøy |
| Vard | 2–1 | Varegg |
| Vålerengen | 2–0 | Fremad Lillehammer |
| Årstad | 1–0 | Nordnes |
Replay
| Djerv 1919 | 1–0 | Baune |
| Donn | 5–1 | Jerv |
| Freidig | 1–3 | Brage |
| Kapp | 9–2 | Kongsberg |

== Third round ==
| Team 1 | Score | Team 2 |
|---|---|---|
12 August 1956
| Sarpsborg | 0–1 | Raufoss |
| Greåker | 3–1 | Strømmen |
| Lisleby | 2–2 (a.e.t.) | Odd |
| Asker | 7–1 | Brage |
| Skeid | 6–2 | Mjøndalen |
| Kapp | 2–0 | Rosenborg |
| Urædd | 0–11 | Fredrikstad |
| Snøgg | 3–1 | Sandefjord BK |
| Donn | 0–1 | Vålerengen |
| Viking | 2–1 | Vard |
| Djerv 1919 | 0–2 | Årstad |
| Brann | 2–0 | Ulf |
| Hødd | 0–5 | Larvik Turn |
| Molde | 2–2 (a.e.t.) | Sparta |
| Ranheim | 2–3 (a.e.t.) | Moss |
| Kvik (Trondheim) | 4–0 | HamKam |
Replay: 26 August 1956
| Odd | 5–3 | Lisleby |
Replay: 27 August 1956
| Sparta | 1–0 | Molde |

== Fourth round ==
| Team 1 | Score | Team 2 |
|---|---|---|
2 September 1956
| Fredrikstad | 6–0 | Kvik (Trondheim) |
| Moss | 0–8 | Skeid |
| Vålerengen | 2–1 (a.e.t.) | Snøgg |
| Raufoss | 1–2 (a.e.t.) | Viking |
| Larvik Turn | 7–2 | Kapp |
| Årstad | 1–6 | Asker |
| Odd | 4–1 | Greåker |
| Sparta | 2–3 | Brann |

== Quarter-finals ==
| Team 1 | Score | Team 2 |
|---|---|---|
23 September 1956
| Skeid | 5–1 | Odd |
| Larvik Turn | 3–3 (a.e.t.) | Fredrikstad |
| Viking | 2–0 | Vålerengen |
| Asker | 3–2 | Brann |
Replay: 30 September 1956
| Fredrikstad | 2–2 (a.e.t.) | Larvik Turn |
2nd replay: 7 October 1956
| Larvik Turn | 3–1 (Note: Played in Horten.) | Fredrikstad |

== Semi-finals ==
| Team 1 | Score | Team 2 |
|---|---|---|
7 October 1956
| Skeid | 1–0 | Asker |
14 October 1956
| Viking | 1–1 (a.e.t.) | Larvik Turn |
Replay: 17 October 1956
| Larvik Turn | 2–1 | Viking |

== Final ==
21 October 1956

| Skeid | 2–1 | Larvik Turn |
|---|---|---|
| Hennum 21'; Gundersen 28' | Report | Sundby 65' |

Ullevaal Stadion, Oslo
Attendance: 33,444
Referee: Gunnar Andersen (Ulefoss)

Skeid:
| GK | Øivind Johannessen |
| DF | Arne Winther |
| DF | Knut Gudem |
| MF | Jan Gulbrandsen |
| MF | Leif Belgen |
| MF | Jack Farem |
| FW | Jan Erik Wold |
| FW | Hans Nordahl |
| FW | Harald Hennum |
| FW | Finn Gundersen |
| FW | Bernhard Johansen |

Larvik Turn:
| GK | Thor Kristiansen |
| DF | Markus Borgersen |
| DF | Harry Boye Karlsen |
| MF | Einar Danielsen |
| MF | Asbjørn Hansen |
| MF | Øivind Johansen |
| FW | Erling Mathisen |
| FW | Gunnar Thoresen |
| FW | Reidar Sundby |
| FW | Per Ljostveit |
| FW | Finn Rismyhr |

== See also ==
- 1955–56 Norwegian Main League
- 1956 in Norwegian football
