= 1925 in Norwegian football =

Football in Norway
Men's football
- NM: Brann

Results from Norwegian football in 1925.

== Class A of local association leagues ==
Class A of local association leagues (kretsserier) is the predecessor of a national league competition.

League	Champion
Østfold	Sarpsborg
Oslo	Frigg
Follo	Ski
Aker	Ekeberg
Lillestrøm og omegn	Lillestrøm SK
Øvre Romerike	Sørumsand
Eidsvoll og omegn	Eidsvold IF
Hamar og omegn	Stange
Opland	Lyn (Gjøvik)
Glommendalen	Kongsvinger
Nordre Østerdalen	Tynset
Trysil og Engerdal	Østby
Øvre Buskerud	Hokksund
Drammen og omegn	Drafn
Vestfold	Ørn
Grenland	Storm
Øvre Telemark	Rjukan
Aust-Agder	Grane (Arendal)
Vest-Agder	Start
Rogaland	Stavanger IF
Hordaland	Voss
Bergen	Djerv
Sogn og Fjordane	Florø
Søndmøre	Aalesund
Romsdalske	Kristiansund
Sør-Trøndelag	Ranheim
Trondhjem	Kvik (Trondhjem)
Nord-Trøndelag	Neset
Namdal	Namsos
Helgeland	Mosjøen
Lofoten og Vesterålen	Narvik/Nor
Troms	Skarp
Finnmark	Vardø

== Norwegian Cup ==
=== Final ===
18 October 1925

Brann	3–0	Sarpsborg
A. Olsen 14'; Berstad 65', 73'	Report

Fredrikstad Stadion, Fredrikstad
Attendance: 10,000
Referee: Fridtjof Johansen (Holmestrand)

== National team ==
7 June 1925 Friendly	Norway	1–0	Finland	Oslo, Norway
12:30 (UTC+1); Match 60	Olsen 86'	Report		Stadium: Gressbanen; Attendance: 12,000; Referee: Axel Bergqvist (Sweden)

21 June 1925 1924–28 Nordic Championship	Denmark	5–1	Norway	Copenhagen, Denmark
(UTC+1); Match 61	Nilsson 7', 71'; Nielsen 49'; Rohde 73'; Ei. Larsen 81'	Report	Lunde 60'	Stadium: Københavns Idrætspark; Attendance: 23,000; Referee: Noel Watson (England)

23 August 1925 1924–28 Nordic Championship	Norway	3–7	Sweden	Oslo, Norway
12:30 (UTC+1); Match 62	Berstad 3', 34'; Lunde 68'	Report	Rydell 22', 42', 44', 62'; Kaufeldt 30', 89'; Haglund 71'	Stadium: Gressbanen; Attendance: 15,000; Referee: Lauritz Andersen (Denmark)
