= Bjørn Borgen =

Norwegian footballer (1937-2015)

Personal information
- Date of birth: 22 September 1937
- Place of birth: Fredrikstad, Norway
- Date of death: 18 November 2015 (aged 78)
- Position: Right winger

Youth career
- Ørn Fjeldberg
- 1948–1955: Fredrikstad

Senior career*
Years	Team	Apps	(Gls)
1956–1958	Fredrikstad		
1959	Lyn		
1960–1968	Fredrikstad		

International career
1957–1966	Norway	35	(6)
- * Club domestic league appearances and goals

Bjørn Borgen (22 September 1937 – 18 November 2015) was a Norwegian footballer who played for Fredrikstad and Lyn, as well as the national team, as a right winger. He later became a coach active in the lower leagues.

== Early career ==
Born in Fredrikstad, Borgen began his career with local team Ørn Fjeldberg before joining Fredrikstad in 1948 at the age of 11, alongside Per Kristoffersen. He won the 1955 Norwegian Junior Cup with the team. He made his debut for the first-team the next year.

=== Debut with the Norway national team ===
By 1957 he was a first-team regular, and had also made his debut for the national team. He suffered from behavioural problems in 1958, and eventually left the club in January 1959 to work in a clothes shop in Oslo and play for Lyn. He returned to Fredrikstad in October 1959, and in 1960 became the youngest Norwegian international to collect 25 caps. That same year he also turned down a professional contract offer from Italian club Fiorentina.

== Later career ==
Borgen spent a significant part of the 1962 season injured. He retired from playing in 1968, alongside Kristoffersen. With Fredrikstad he won the league championship three times, and also the national cup three times. He scored 6 goals in 35 senior international appearances for Norway, and also represented them at youth level.

He later became a coach of lower-league teams, including Rapid, Moss, Trosvik and Rolvsøy. He also played for Rolvsøy in a Cup match in 1972, against Fredrikstad.

== Death and legacy ==
Borgen died on 18 November 2015 following a long illness. Kristoffersen subsequently described him as the best right winger Norway has ever produced.
