= 1955 Norwegian Football Cup =

Norgesmesterskapet i fotball for menn 1955

Tournament details
- Country: Norway
- Teams: 128 (main competition)

Final positions
- Champions: Skeid (3rd title)
- Runners-up: Lillestrøm

The 1955 Norwegian Football Cup was the 50th season of the Norwegian annual knockout football tournament. The tournament was open for all members of NFF, except those from Northern Norway. The final was played at Ullevaal Stadion in Oslo on 23 October 1955, and was contested the defending champions Skeid, and Lillestrøm, who also lost the final in 1953. Skeid successfully defended their title with a 5–0 victory in the final.

== First round ==
Team 1	Score	Team 2
AIK Lund	0–7	Stavanger
Asker	13–0	Bjørkelangen
Askim	0–3	Lisleby
Aurskog	2–0	Hard
Baune	0–2 (a.e.t.)	Jotun
Borg	2–6	Larvik Turn
Buøy	1–1 (a.e.t.)	Bryne
Donn	1–1 (a.e.t.)	Ulf
Drafn	1–1 (a.e.t.)	Eiker
Drammens BK	1–0	Ørn
Eik	1–0	Grane (Arendal)
Falken	0–1	Nessegutten
Fana	1–4 (a.e.t.)	Brann
Fram (Larvik)	3–1	Kragerø
Fredrikstad	5–0	Tune
Fremad Lillehammer	2–2 (a.e.t.)	Brage
Geithus	4–1	Sagene
Gjøvik-Lyn	11–1	Brumunddal
Greåker	4–1	Borgen
Grue	0–8	Frigg
Hamar	4–0	Grüner
Hødd	1–1 (a.e.t.)	Eid
Jerv	1–3	Nedenes
Kongsberg	4–5 (a.e.t.)	Snøgg
Kristiansund	5–1	Træff
Kvik (Trondheim)	2–1	Tryggkam
Langesund	5–2	Herkules
Lillestrøm	3–0	Stabæk
Lillestrøm/Fram	1–2	Vålerengen
Lyn	7–2	Gjøvik SK
Mjøndalen	4–2	Sarpsborg
Moelven	1–8	Kapp
Molde	1–0	Braatt
Moss	0–1	Drøbak-Frogn
Neset	1–3	Rosenborg
Nordnes	5–1	Nymark
Nærbø	3–2	Start
Odd	6–1	Rjukan
Orkanger	0–0 (a.e.t.)	Clausenengen
Os	1–2 (a.e.t.)	Varegg
Rollon	0–2	Aalesund
Sandaker	4–0	Rapid
Selbak	2–0	Aasen
Sparta	1–0	Grei
Spartacus	4–2	Raufoss
Stag	1–4	Sandefjord BK
Steinberg	1–2	Sem
Steinkjer	2–2 (a.e.t.)	Freidig
Stord	2–3	Djerv 1919
Storm	3–1	Ulefoss
Strømmen	7–2	Ski
Sverre	3–1	Malm
Sykkylven	0–5	Langevåg
Sørfjell	1–6	Pors
Tønsberg Turn	3–0	Solberg
Urædd	4–1	Brevik
Vang	0–1	Skeid
Vard	1–0	Årstad
Vardal	2–5	HamKam
Verdal	0–2	Ranheim
Vestfossen	4–1	Jevnaker
Viking	4–0	Vidar
Voss	1–2	Djerv
Ålgård	5–1	Flekkefjord
Replay
Brage	4–2	Fremad Lillehammer
Bryne	1–3	Buøy
Clausenengen	1–0	Orkanger
Eid	1–5	Hødd
Eiker	1–3	Drafn
Freidig	3–2	Steinkjer
Ulf	2–3	Donn

== Second round ==
Team 1	Score	Team 2
Brage	4–3 (a.e.t.)	Kvik (Trondheim)
Brann	2–1	Hødd
Buøy	3–2	Vard
Clausenengen	1–4	Molde
Djerv	0–2	Varegg
Djerv 1919	1–2	Viking
Donn	1–2	Nærbø
Drafn	3–1	Geithus
Drøbak-Frogn	0–5	Fredrikstad
Freidig	2–1	Kristiansund
Frigg	1–0	Drammens BK
Gjøvik-Lyn	1–0	Jotun
HamKam	2–0	Greåker
Kapp	3–2	Sandaker
Larvik Turn	19–0	Langesund
Lillestrøm	5–3 (a.e.t.)	Selbak
Lisleby	3–1	Fram (Larvik)
Nedenes	0–9	Odd
Nessegutten	1–2	Rosenborg
Pors	1–0	Mjøndalen
Ranheim	1–2	Sverre
Sandefjord BK	6–0	Spartacus
Sem	0–4	Asker
Skeid	4–1	Eik
Snøgg	7–0	Urædd
Sparta	3–1	Aurskog
Stavanger	1–2	Ålgård
Storm	1–0	Vestfossen
Strømmen	3–1	Hamar
Tønsberg Turn	1–3	Lyn
Vålerengen	8–0	Nordnes
Aalesund	0–1	Langevåg

== Third round ==
Team 1	Score	Team 2
25 June 1955
Lyn	2–2 (a.e.t.)	Frigg
26 June 1955
Fredrikstad	4–0	Gjøvik-Lyn
Asker	1–0	Storm
Kapp	4–3	Brage
Larvik Turn	5–1	Snøgg
Pors	2–4	Sandefjord BK
Odd	5–1	Drafn
Ålgård	2–6	Brann
Varegg	4–2	Buøy
Langevåg	3–7	Strømmen
Molde	0–3	Lillestrøm
Rosenborg	4–2	Sparta
Sverre	3–1	Freidig
28 June 1955
HamKam	0–1	Skeid
Lisleby	3–2 (a.e.t.)	Vålerengen
3 July 1955
Nærbø	1–2	Viking
Replay: 2 July 1955
Frigg	0–4	Lyn

== Fourth round ==
Team 1	Score	Team 2
20 August 1955
Lillestrøm	4–3	Lyn
21 August 1955
Fredrikstad	8–1	Varegg
Skeid	5–1	Sverre
Strømmen	3–3 (a.e.t.)	Odd
Sandefjord BK	5–0	Kapp
Viking	4–0	Lisleby
Brann	1–3	Asker
Rosenborg	2–4	Larvik Turn
Replay: 28 August 1955
Odd	1–2	Strømmen

== Quarter-finals ==
Team 1	Score	Team 2
4 September 1955
Asker	4–1	Fredrikstad
Lillestrøm	1–0	Strømmen
Skeid	2–1	Sandefjord BK
Larvik Turn	1–2	Viking

== Semi-finals ==
Team 1	Score	Team 2
3 October 1955
Asker	0–1	Lillestrøm
Viking	1–2	Skeid

== Final ==
23 October 1955

Skeid	5–0	Lillestrøm
Hennum 1', 15'; Farem 50', 76', 84'	Report

Ullevaal Stadion, Oslo
Attendance: 33,825
Referee: Henry Klausen (Sarpsborg)

Skeid:
GK	Øivind Johannessen
DF	Arne Winther
DF	Knut Gudem
MF	Jan Gulbrandsen
MF	Leif Belgen
MF	Finn Gundersen
FW	Jan Erik Wold
FW	Hans Nordahl
FW	Harald Hennum
FW	Bernhard Johansen
FW	Jack Farem

Lillestrøm:
GK	Anders Binde
DF	Hans Hansen
DF	Kjell Waaler
MF	Rolf Wahl
MF	Ivar Christiansen
MF	Svein Bergersen
FW	Odd Karlsen
FW	Ivar Hansen
FW	Sverre Borgersen
FW	Gunnar Arnesen
FW	Per Sæther

== See also ==
- 1954–55 Norwegian Main League
- 1955 in Norwegian football
