= 1925 Norwegian Football Cup =

Norgesmesterskapet i fotball for menn 1925

Tournament details
- Country: Norway
- Teams: 94

Final positions
- Champions: Brann (2nd title)
- Runners-up: Sarpsborg

The 1925 Norwegian Football Cup was the 24th season of the Norwegian annual knockout football tournament. The tournament was open for all members of NFF, except those from Northern Norway. Brann won their second title, having beaten Sarpsborg in the final. Odd were the defending champions, but were eliminated by Ørn in the quarterfinal.

== First round ==
Team 1	Score	Team 2
Blink	1–3	Rapp
Brage	3–1	Røros
Bøn	4–2	Fet
Djerv	9–0	Vard
Drammens BK	5–2	Gjeithus
Eidsvold	8–0	Sørumsand
Egersund	0–3	Viking
Fagforeningenes IL (Hamar)	4–0	Tynset
Falk	1–3	Torp
Flekkefjord	4–3 (a.e.t.)	Vidar
Gjøa	5–0	Roy
Grane	5–4	Donn
Hafslund	3–2	Mercantile
Kristiansund	3–2	Braatt
Kraakstad	1–7	Hasle
Larvik Turn	3–2	Skotfos
Lillestrøm BK	2–0	Dokken
Lisleby	3–1	Ski
Mandalskameratene	0–1	Start
Mjøndalen	5–0	Tell
Molde	4–2	Fremad
Namsos	2–2 (a.e.t.)	Steinkjer
Nesset	1–2	Kvik (Trondhjem)
Pors	3–5 (a.e.t.)	Holmestrand
Rjukan	10–3	Kongsberg
Rollon	3–0 (a.e.t.)	Hødd
Skiold	6–2	Agnes
Snøgg	6–5	Haugsund
Stabæk	3–1	Norrøna
Stange	0–2	Lyn (Gjøvik)
Stavanger	5–2	Brodd
Storm	11–0	Ulefos
Strinden	6–3	Steinar
Sverre	2–0	Freidig
Tryggkameratene	1–3	Ranheim
Tønsberg Turn	4–0	Kampørn
Vigør	1–12	Fram
Vikersund	1–4	Strømsgodset
Voss	0–2	Hardy
Vaalerengen	4–1	Liv
Aalesund,	Bye	
Brann	Bye	
Drafn	Bye	
Frigg	Bye	
Hamar	Bye	
Kvik (Fredrikshald)	Bye	
Lillestrøm	Bye	
Lyn	Bye	
Odd	Bye	
Ready	Bye	
Sarpsborg	Bye	
Trygg	Bye	
Urædd	Bye	
Ørn	Bye	
Replay
Steinkjer	4–2	Namsos

== Second round ==
Team 1	Score	Team 2
Brage	1–0	Ranheim
Drafn	4–3	Holmestrand
Eidsvold	2–3	Drammens BK
Fagforeningenes IL (Hamar)	0–1	Bøn
Fram	4–1	Grane
Fredrikstad	4–1	Hafslund
Hasle	1–0	Lillestrøm BK
Kristiansund	4–1	Hødd
Kvik (Fredrikshald)	4–1	Frigg
Kvik (Trondhjem)	3–1	Hamar
Larvik Turn	8–1	Lillestrøm
Rapp	2–4	Sverre
Sarpsborg	6–0	Tønsberg Turn
Skiold	3–2	Hardy
Stabæk	2–5	Gjøa
Stavanger	2–0	Start
Steinkjer	3–1	Strinden
Storm	2–0	Snøgg
Strømsgodset	5–2	Lyn
Torp	2–0	Ready
Viking	8–1	Flekkefjord
Urædd	2–1	Rjukan
Vaalerengen	2–1	Lisleby
Aalesund	5–1	Molde
Brann	Bye	
Djerv	Bye	
Lyn (Gjøvik)	Bye	
Mjøndalen	Bye	
Moss	Bye	
Odd	Bye	
Trygg	Bye	
Ørn	Bye	

== Third round ==
Team 1	Score	Team 2
Aalesund	5–0	Kristiansund
Brann	4–0	Trygg
Drafn	2–2 (a.e.t.)	Storm
Fram	0–1	Fredrikstad
Gjøa	2–1	Mjøndalen
Lyn (Gjøvik)	6–0	Bøn
Kvik (Fredrikshald)	4–1	Torp
Kvik (Trondhjem)	8–1	Steinkjer
Larvik Turn	5–1	Drammen
Odd	3–1	Strømsgodset
Stavanger	2–0	Moss
Sverre	1–2	Brage
Urædd	1–2	Sarpsborg
Viking	6–3 (a.e.t.)	Djerv
Vaalerengen	6–0	Hasle
Ørn	6–1	Skiold
Replay
Storm	3–3 (a.e.t.)	Drafn
2nd replay
Drafn	4–0	Storm

== Fourth round ==
Team 1	Score	Team 2
Brann	5–0	Stavanger
Drafn	0–1	Ørn
Fredrikstad	7–2	Lyn (Gjøvik)
Kvik (Trondhjem)	1–0 (a.e.t.)	Brage
Larvik Turn	2–4	Kvik (Fredrikshald)
Odd	3–2	Vaalerengen
Sarpsborg	5–1	Gjøa
Viking	2–1	Aalesund

== Quarter-finals ==
Team 1	Score	Team 2
Brann	5–3	Fredrikstad
Sarpsborg	3–0	Kvik (Fredrikshald)
Viking	3–2	Kvik (Trondhjem)
Ørn	3–2	Odd

== Semi-finals ==
Team 1	Score	Team 2
Brann	3–1	Viking
Sarpsborg	1–0	Ørn

== Final ==
18 October 1925

Brann	3–0	Sarpsborg
A. Olsen 14'; Berstad 65', 73'	Report

Fredrikstad Stadion, Fredrikstad
Attendance: 10,000
Referee: Fridtjof Johansen (Holmestrand)

== See also ==
- 1925 in Norwegian football
