= Finn Alfred Hansen =

Danish footballer (born 1935)

Personal information
- Date of birth: 9 October 1935 (age 91)

International career
Years	Team	Apps	(Gls)
1957–1958	Denmark	4	(1)

Finn Alfred Hansen (born 9 October 1935) is a Danish footballer. He played in four matches for the Denmark national football team from 1957 to 1958.
