= Åge Sørensen =

Norwegian footballer (1937–2022)

Personal information
- Full name: Åge Leif Sørensen
- Date of birth: 18 May 1937
- Place of birth: Oslo, Norway
- Date of death: 18 March 2022 (aged 84)
- Place of death: Oslo, Norway
- Position: Forward

Senior career*
Years	Team	Apps	(Gls)
1955–1969	Vålerenga		

International career
1955	Norway U19	1	(0)
1955–1959	Norway U21	4	(0)
1959–1961	Norway	4	(1)
1961–1964	Norway B	3	(0)
- * Club domestic league appearances and goals

Åge Sørensen (18 May 1937 – 18 March 2022) was a Norwegian footballer who played as a forward. He made four appearances for the Norway national team from 1959 to 1961.
