= Jan Ekström =

Swedish footballer

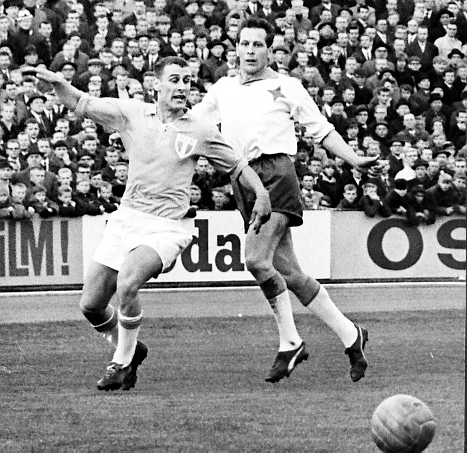
- Åke Johansson facing Jan Ekström (left) in an April 1964 Allsvenskan game between Malmö FF and IFK Norrköping at Malmö Stadion

Personal information
- Full name: Jan Ekström
- Date of birth: 11 October 1937 (age 89)
- Place of birth: Sweden
- Position: Midfielder

Senior career*
Years	Team	Apps	(Gls)
1955–1960	Malmö FF		
- IFK Hässleholm
- Sandvikens IF
1964–1966	Malmö FF		

International career
1956–1957	Sweden	5	(2)
- * Club domestic league appearances and goals

Jan Ekström (born 11 October 1937) is a Swedish former footballer who played as a midfielder.
