= Gunnar Talsethagen =

Norwegian writer and association footballer (1931–2021)

Personal information
- Full name: Gunnar Talsethagen
- Date of birth: 15 March 1931
- Place of birth: Molde, Norway
- Date of death: 11 December 2021 (aged 90)

Senior career*
Years	Team	Apps	(Gls)
- Molde

Managerial career
- 1956–1957: Molde
- 1959–1961: Molde
- 1963–1968: Molde
- * Club domestic league appearances and goals

Gunnar Talsethagen (15 March 1931 − 11 December 2021) was a Norwegian author and former football player, football coach and lecturer. As an active player, Talsethagen spent most of his entire career at Molde FK. He grew up in Molde.

== Coaching career ==
Gunnar Talsethagen had three spells as head coach at Molde FK between 1956 and 1968. His first season as coach, he was still playing and shared the responsibilities with co-head coach Arne Legernes throughout the 1956–57 season. In 1959, he began his second spell as Molde's head coach. He was replaced by Ulf Møller in 1962, but was back as head coach in 1963. Molde, a third tier club at the time, were led by Talsethagen until the end of the 1968 season. During his third and final spell as Molde's head coach, Talsethagen managed the team in a total of 102 matches and won 59 of them.

== Career as writer ==
In 2000, Talsethagen's book Gatelangs i Molde was published. The book contains stories about streets and roads in the municipality of Molde.

== Managerial statistics ==
Managerial record by team and tenure
Team	From	To	Record				
Team	From	To	P	W	D	L	Win %
Molde	1959	1961	31	9	7	15	29.03
Molde	1963	1968	102	59	14	29	57.84
Total			133	68	21	44	51.13
