= Odd Berg (footballer) =

Norwegian footballer and coach (born 1952)

Personal information
- Full name: Odd Sigurd Berg
- Date of birth: 3 January 1952 (age 74)
- Place of birth: Molde, Norway
- Position: Forward

Senior career*
Years	Team	Apps	(Gls)
1968–1975	Molde	?	(?)
1976	Lyn	?	(?)

International career
1974	Norway U21	2	(0)

Managerial career
- 1978–1979: Træff
- 2003: Molde
- 2004–2005: Molde (assistant)
- 2015: Start (assistant)
- * Club domestic league appearances and goals

Odd Sigurd Berg (born 3 January 1952) is a Norwegian football coach and former player. As a player, he played mostly for Molde FK. In 1974, he became top goalscorer in the top division with 13 goals, the first Molde-player to become top scorer in the top division. He later coached Molde, both as an assistant and head coach.

== Playing career ==
Berg played for Molde from 1968 to 1975. In 1973, he contributed to Molde's promotion to 1. divisjon, the first tier. He became the club's first ever first-tier top scorer by scoring 13 goals in the 1974 season, where Molde finished in second place and were awarded silver medals. Berg was capped twice for Norway under-21 in 1974. He played half a season for Lyn in the 1976 season, before retiring from top level football. However, Berg kept on playing in lower leagues for several years.

== Coaching career ==
Odd Berg was appointed head coach at Molde on 22 May 2003, after Gunder Bengtsson left the position. Molde finished 9th in the 2003 season. At the end of the season, Reidar Vågnes replaced Berg as Molde's head coach. Berg stated that he was disappointed by the club's decision, but stayed at the club as assistant coach till the end of the 2005 season.

In the 2015 season, Berg was assistant coach at Start.

== Personal life ==
His brother is Jan Berg. Unlike his brother, Odd Berg was never capped for Norway. He is also the brother-in-law of Stein Olav Hestad and the maternal uncle of Daniel Berg Hestad, both of whom played many years for Molde.
