= Mogens Machon =

Danish footballer (born 1934)

Personal information
- Date of birth: 7 October 1934 (age 92)

International career
Years	Team	Apps	(Gls)
1957–1958	Denmark	6	(2)

Mogens Machon (born 7 October 1934) is a Danish footballer. He played in six matches for the Denmark national football team from 1957 to 1958.
