= Finn Gundersen =

Norwegian ice hockey player and footballer (1933-2014)

Personal information
- Nationality: Norwegian
- Born: 16 April 1933 Oslo, Norway
- Died: 30 July 2014 (aged 81)

Sport
- Sport: Ice hockey; Football

Finn Harry Gundersen (16 April 1933 – 30 July 2014) was a Norwegian ice hockey player and football player, born in Oslo, Norway.

== Ice hockey career ==
He played for the Norway men's national ice hockey team, and participated at the Winter Olympics in 1952, where the Norwegian team placed 9th. He was also Norwegian Champions in ice hockey in 1959 with Tigrene.

== Football career ==
He played football for Skeid where he won the Norwegian Football Cup in 1954, 1955 and 1956. An attacking midfielder, he played professional football for Hellas Verona in Italy in 1957–58, and represented the Norway national football team ten times scoring two goals.

== International goals ==
Norway score listed first, score column indicates score after each Gundersen goal.

International goals by date, venue, cap, opponent, score, result and competition
No.	Date	Venue	Opponent	Score	Result	Competition
1	16 September 1956	Ullevaal Stadion, Oslo, Norway	Sweden	1–0	3–1	1956–59 Nordic Football Championship
2	16 September 1956	Ullevaal Stadion, Oslo, Norway	Sweden	3–0	3–1	1956–59 Nordic Football Championship
