= Peder Kjær =

Danish footballer (born 1935)

Personal information
- Date of birth: 23 February 1935 (age 91)

International career
Years	Team	Apps	(Gls)
1957	Denmark	3	(1)

Peder Kjær (born 23 February 1935) is a Danish footballer. He played in three matches for the Denmark national football team in 1957.
