= 1956–57 Norwegian Main League =

13th season of top-tier football league in Norway

Hovedserien
- Season: 1956–57
- Champions: Fredrikstad; 7th title
- Relegated: Årstad; Sarpsborg FK; Vålerengen; Rapid

The 1956–57 Hovedserien was the 13th completed season of top division football in Norway.

== Overview ==
It was contested by 16 teams, and Fredrikstad won the championship, their seventh league title. Sarpsborg FK was one of three teams to have appeared in all 12 completed editions of the top division, but was relegated at the end of the season.

== Teams and locations ==
Note: Table lists in alphabetical order.

Group A
Team	Ap.	Location
Årstad	6	Bergen
Larvik Turn	8	Larvik
Odd	10	Skien
Sandefjord BK	11	Sandefjord
Sarpsborg FK	12	Sarpsborg
Skeid	11	Oslo
Sparta	9	Sarpsborg
Viking	12	Stavanger

Group B
Team	Ap.	Location
Asker	6	Asker
Fredrikstad	12	Fredrikstad
Frigg	5	Oslo
Lillestrøm	7	Lillestrøm
Rapid	3	Moss
Steinkjer	3	Steinkjer
Strømmen	7	Strømmen
Vålerengen	10	Oslo

== League tables ==
=== Group A ===
Pos	Team	Pld	W	D	L	GF	GA	GD	Pts	Qualification or relegation
1	Odd	14	7	6	1	23	14	+9	20	Qualification for the championship final
2	Larvik Turn	14	7	3	4	25	16	+9	17	
3	Sandefjord BK	14	8	1	5	23	14	+9	17	
4	Skeid	14	5	5	4	25	19	+6	15	
5	Viking	14	5	5	4	19	15	+4	15	
6	Sparta	14	2	6	6	17	28	−11	10	
7	Årstad (R)	14	3	3	8	21	32	−11	9	Relegation to Landsdelsserien
8	Sarpsborg FK (R)	14	3	3	8	14	29	−15	9	Relegation to Landsdelsserien

Source: RSSSF
(R) Relegated

=== Group B ===
Pos	Team	Pld	W	D	L	GF	GA	GD	Pts	Qualification or relegation
1	Fredrikstad (C)	14	11	1	2	60	25	+35	23	Qualification for the championship final
2	Strømmen	14	8	2	4	39	22	+17	18	
3	Lillestrøm	14	7	2	5	21	22	−1	16	
4	Asker	14	5	4	5	34	35	−1	14	
5	Steinkjer	14	5	4	5	26	41	−15	14	
6	Frigg	14	5	2	7	25	26	−1	12	
7	Vålerengen (R)	14	5	1	8	20	29	−9	11	Relegation to Landsdelsserien
8	Rapid (R)	14	2	0	12	15	40	−25	4	Relegation to Landsdelsserien

Source: RSSSF
(C) Champions; (R) Relegated

== Results ==
=== Group A ===
Home \ Away	ÅRS	LAR	ODD	SBK	SAR	SKD	SPA	VIK
Årstad		1–3	0–0	1–3	2–0	1–2	3–2	2–0
Larvik Turn	5–2		3–1	0–2	4–0	3–1	1–1	1–0
Odd	2–2	1–1		1–0	2–1	4–1	5–2	2–2
Sandefjord BK	3–1	0–1	1–2		3–0	1–1	3–0	1–0
Sarpsborg FK	3–2	1–1	0–1	1–3		1–1	1–1	1–0
Skeid	1–1	1–0	0–1	4–0	4–0		4–0	3–3
Sparta	7–3	2–1	0–0	0–2	1–4	1–1		0–0
Viking	1–0	3–1	1–1	2–1	4–1	3–1	0–0	

Source: NIFS.no
Legend: Blue = home team win; Yellow = draw; Red = away team win.

=== Group B ===
Home \ Away	ASK	FFK	FRI	LIL	RAP	SFK	STR	VIF
Asker		3–7	2–1	4–1	6–1	3–3	3–3	2–0
Fredrikstad	2–2		6–3	3–1	7–1	9–2	7–3	4–0
Frigg	6–0	1–4		2–1	2–0	3–4	1–1	1–1
Lillestrøm	2–1	2–0	0–2		2–0	1–1	1–0	2–0
Rapid	3–2	1–2	1–2	2–4		1–2	0–2	4–1
Steinkjer	0–0	2–5	2–0	2–2	4–0		2–5	2–1
Strømmen	2–3	2–1	2–0	4–0	1–0	10–0		2–1
Vålerengen	4–3	2–3	2–1	1–2	3–1	1–0	3–2	

Source: NIFS.no
Legend: Blue = home team win; Yellow = draw; Red = away team win.

== Championship final ==
- Fredrikstad 6–1 Odd
