= Reidar Vågnes =

Norwegian footballer and coach (born 1950)

Personal information
- Date of birth: 10 January 1950 (age 76)
- Position: Defender

Senior career*
Years	Team	Apps	(Gls)
- Hødd
1973–?	Langevåg		
- Aalesund

Managerial career
- 1986–1987: Hareid
- 1990–1992: Hødd
- 1993–?: Norway U20 Women
- 1998–1999: Molde (assistant)
- 2004: Molde
- 2010: Hønefoss
- * Club domestic league appearances and goals

Reidar Vågnes (born 10 January 1950) is a Norwegian football coach and former player.

As a player, Vågnes played one season in the top flight in Norwegian football. His club, Hødd were relegated from the 1972 Norwegian First Division. In 1973, he went on to play for his local club Langevåg. Vågnes played later for Aalesund.

Vågnes coached Hareid in 1986 and 1987. He took over after Otto Sundgot as Hødd coach in 1990, assisted by Kjetil Hasund. He resigned in the summer 1992. Late 1993 he was appointed as coach for the Under-20 girls national team. Vågnes is best known for his time in Molde Fotballklubb as assistant under Erik Brakstad through the 1998 and 1999 seasons and as head coach for Molde in 2004. Between 2000 and 2003, he was part of the staff in Aalesunds Fotballklubb. After his period in Molde he was back in Aalesund on 23 November 2006. On 29 June 2010 he was appointed as manager in Hønefoss for the rest of the 2010 season. He did not want a contract extension when the 2010 season was finished and left the club after their relegation in the end of the season.
