= Alexander Olsen =

Norwegian footballer (1899-1975)

Personal information
- Date of birth: 5 March 1899
- Place of birth: Bergen, Norway
- Date of death: 4 June 1975 (aged 76)

International career
Years	Team	Apps	(Gls)
1919–1932	Norway	37	(1)

Alexander Olsen (5 March 1899 – 4 June 1975) was a Norwegian footballer. He played in 37 matches for the Norway national football team from 1919 to 1932. He was also part of Norway's squad for the football tournament at the 1920 Summer Olympics, but he did not play in any matches.
