= Erik Brakstad =

Norwegian footballer and coach (born 1951)

Personal information
- Date of birth: 19 April 1951 (age 75)
- Place of birth: Molde, Norway
- Position: Defender

Senior career*
Years	Team	Apps	(Gls)
1968–1976	Molde		
1977	Træff		
1978–1979	Molde		

Managerial career
- 1977: Træff (playing coach)
- 1994–1996: Hødd
- 1997: Molde (assistant)
- 1998–2000: Molde
- 2001: Bryne
- 2001: Hødd
- 2002: Moss
- 2004–2005: Kristiansund
- 2006: Hødd
- 2009–2014: Træff
- * Club domestic league appearances and goals

Erik Brakstad (born 19 April 1951) is a Norwegian former football player and coach. He is best known for his career as coach. Brakstad has both played for and been head coach for Molde and Træff. He is the brother of Torkild Brakstad.

== Coaching career ==
=== Early career ===
Brakstad was born in Molde. As a coach, he began his career as a playing coach in Træff. After several years as Træff coach he went on to coach Hødd. As Hødd coach, Brakstad won the 1994 Norwegian First Division and gained promotion to the 1995 Tippeligaen. The team reached the semifinal in the 1995 Norwegian Cup, and in the league they finished 12th in their first season back in the top flight and was relegated.

=== Molde ===
After three seasons in Hødd, Brakstad went on to Molde to be assistant coach under Åge Hareide. When Hareide left the club after the 1997 season, Brakstad took over as head coach in Molde. With Brakstad as head coach, Molde were runners-up in Tippeligaen in both 1998 and 1999. In 1998 he led the club during a 21-game unbeaten run, which still, as of 2019, is a club record. In 1999, under Brakstad's management, Molde became the second Norwegian club to enter the UEFA Champions League. On 20 October 1999, he led the team to their first Champions League win in club history by defeating Olympiacos 3–2 at home. On 31 October 2000, Brakstad was sacked from his position as head coach in Molde.

=== Bryne ===
Brakstad went on to coach Bryne in 2001. He signed a three-year contract with the club. On 18 June 2001, Brakstad resigned from his position as Bryne's head coach, effecting immediately.

=== Moss ===
After leaving Bryne, Brakstad had a short spell back in Hødd in 2001. 21 August 2001 was Brakstad presented as head coach in Moss, starting 1 January 2002. On 28 August 2002, he was removed from his position as head coach in Moss and was succeeded by Rune Tangen.

=== Later career ===
On 17 November 2003, Brakstad was appointed as the first head coach in the recently founded club Kristiansund BK. With Kristiansund, he won the 2005 Third Division play-offs and gained promotion to the Second Division in 2006. In 2006, Brakstad was appointed as head coach in Hødd for the third time in his career. In 2009, Brakstad started his second spell as head coach in Træff. After the 2014 season, Brakstad chose to quit his job as head coach in Træff.

== Personal life ==
Brakstad currently works as a teacher at Bekkevoll Youth School in Molde.

== See also ==
- List of Molde FK managers
