= Knut Sandengen =

Norwegian footballer (1932-1969)

Personal information
- Date of birth: 26 May 1932
- Date of death: 8 February 1969 (aged 36)

International career
Years	Team	Apps	(Gls)
1956	Norway	2	(0)

Knut Sandengen (26 May 1932 – 8 February 1969) was a Norwegian footballer. He played in four matches for the Norway national football team in 1956.
