= Arne Høivik =

Norwegian footballer (1932–2017)

Arne Fredrik Høivik (9 January 1932 – 16 March 2017) was a Norwegian footballer. He played for Eik-Tønsberg his entire career, including several seasons in the top Norwegian league, which were crowned with a league silver in 1960 and league bronze in 1961. He was capped four times for the Norwegian national team, scoring once.
