= Torkild Brakstad =

Norwegian footballer and coach (1945–2021)

Personal information
- Full name: Torkild Brakstad
- Date of birth: 20 September 1945
- Place of birth: Molde, Norway
- Date of death: 14 May 2021 (aged 75)
- Place of death: Molde, Norway
- Position: Central defender

Youth career
- Molde

Senior career*
Years	Team	Apps	(Gls)
1962–1973	Molde		
1974–1978	Molde	104	(12)

International career
1974	Norway	3	(0)

Managerial career
- 1969–1974: Molde
- 1976: Molde
- 1978: Molde
- 1983–1984: Tromsø
- 1986: Rosenborg
- 1986: Molde
- * Club domestic league appearances and goals

Torkild Brakstad (20 September 1945 – 14 May 2021) was a Norwegian football player and manager.

Brakstad played as a central defender for his hometown team Molde FK from 1962 to 1978. Between 1974 and 1978, while Molde was in the Norwegian Premier League, Brakstad played 108 matches and scored 12 goals. Brakstad was capped three times on the Norway national team in 1974.

Brakstad acted as playing manager of Molde FK from 1969 to 1974 and in 1976 and as a manager from 1980 and 1981 and in 1986. He was also manager of Tromsø IL 1983–1984 and of Rosenborg BK 1986.

== Personal life ==
He was the brother of former Molde player and coach Erik Brakstad.

He died on 14 May 2021 in his hometown Molde.
