= Reino Börjesson =

Swedish footballer (1929–2023)

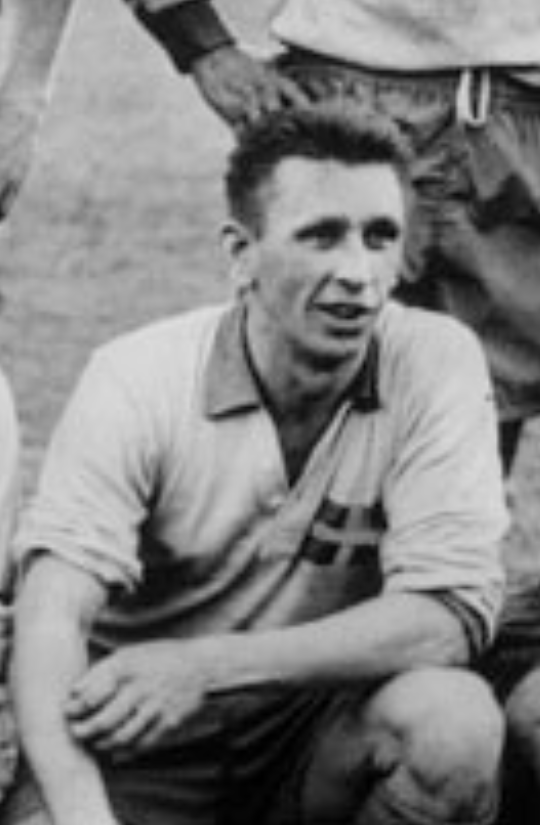
- Börjesson with Sweden during the 1958 FIFA World Cup

Personal information
- Date of birth: 4 February 1929
- Place of birth: Partille, Sweden
- Date of death: 21 October 2023 (aged 94)
- Place of death: Partille
- Position: Midfielder

Senior career*
Years	Team	Apps	(Gls)
1948–1950	Jonsereds IF		
1950–1953	IFK Göteborg	50	(27)
1953–1958	Norrby IF		
1959–1961	Örgryte IS		

International career
1951–1958	Sweden	10	(2)
Medal record
Men's Football
Representing Sweden
FIFA World Cup
Runner-up	1958 Sweden
- * Club domestic league appearances and goals

Reino Erik Börjesson (4 February 1929 – 21 October 2023) was a Swedish professional footballer who played as a midfielder for Jonsereds IF, IFK Göteborg, Norrby IF, and Örgryte IS. He played ten international matches for Sweden and participated in the 1958 FIFA World Cup Final when Sweden lost 5–2 to Brazil.

== Personal life and death ==
Börjesson was born to a Swedish father, footballer Erik Börjesson, and Finnish mother, Hilja. He died on 21 October 2023, at the age of 94.
