= 1955–56 Norwegian Main League =

12th season of top-tier football league in Norway

Hovedserien
- Season: 1955–56
- Champions: Larvik Turn; 3rd title
- Relegated: Brann; Varegg; Kvik (Trondheim); Ranheim

The 1955–56 Hovedserien was the 12th completed season of top division football in Norway.

== Overview ==
It was contested by 16 teams, and Larvik Turn won the championship, their third league title.

== Teams and locations ==
Note: Table lists in alphabetical order.

Group A
Team	Ap.	Location
Brann	9	Bergen
Larvik Turn	7	Larvik
Odd	9	Skien
Rapid	2	Moss
Sandefjord BK	10	Sandefjord
Vålerengen	9	Oslo
Varegg	3	Bergen
Viking	11	Stavanger

Group B
Team	Ap.	Location
Asker	5	Asker
Fredrikstad	11	Fredrikstad
Frigg	4	Oslo
Kvik	3	Trondheim
Lillestrøm	6	Lillestrøm
Ranheim	7	Trondheim
Sarpsborg FK	11	Sarpsborg
Skeid	10	Oslo

== League tables ==
=== Group A ===
Pos	Team	Pld	W	D	L	GF	GA	GD	Pts	Qualification or relegation
1	Larvik Turn (C)	14	10	1	3	40	15	+25	21	Qualification for the championship final
2	Sandefjord BK	14	7	2	5	26	19	+7	16	
3	Viking	14	5	5	4	25	26	−1	15	
4	Vålerengen	14	5	4	5	23	28	−5	14	
5	Rapid	14	4	4	6	23	26	−3	12	
6	Odd	14	4	4	6	18	24	−6	12	
7	Brann (R)	14	4	3	7	27	27	0	11	Relegation
8	Varegg (R)	14	3	5	6	15	32	−17	11	Relegation

Source: RSSSF
(C) Champions; (R) Relegated

=== Group B ===
Pos	Team	Pld	W	D	L	GF	GA	GD	Pts	Qualification or relegation
1	Fredrikstad	14	13	1	0	54	17	+37	27	Qualification for the championship final
2	Asker	14	11	1	2	41	16	+25	23	
3	Skeid	14	7	3	4	34	18	+16	17	
4	Lillestrøm	14	6	1	7	19	25	−6	13	
5	Frigg	14	6	0	8	27	37	−10	12	
6	Sarpsborg FK	14	3	5	6	27	30	−3	11	
7	Kvik (R)	14	2	2	10	12	44	−32	6	Relegation
8	Ranheim (R)	14	1	1	12	12	39	−27	3	Relegation

Source: RSSSF
(R) Relegated

== Results ==
=== Group A ===
Home \ Away	SKB	LAR	ODD	RAP	SBK	VIF	VAR	VIK
Brann		2–1	6–2	1–3	2–1	2–2	1–2	4–1
Larvik Turn	2–1		2–1	2–2	6–1	3–1	2–0	3–0
Odd	3–1	1–0		3–1	1–0	1–2	1–1	1–1
Rapid	1–1	1–2	2–0		0–1	1–1	3–3	5–3
Sandefjord BK	1–0	1–2	4–1	4–1		5–1	0–0	1–1
Vålerengen	3–2	1–2	0–0	3–2	2–5		0–2	2–2
Varegg	3–2	0–11	1–1	0–1	1–2	0–3		0–3
Viking	2–2	3–2	3–2	2–0	1–0	1–2	2–2	

Source: NIFS.no
Legend: Blue = home team win; Yellow = draw; Red = away team win.

=== Group B ===
Home \ Away	ASK	FFK	FRI	KVI	LIL	RAN	SAR	SKD
Asker		2–4	2–1	9–0	2–1	2–1	1–1	3–1
Fredrikstad	2–1		2–0	8–1	4–1	3–2	4–1	2–0
Frigg	1–3	2–7		4–1	2–1	3–1	2–7	1–2
Kvik	1–2	0–4	1–2		0–1	0–0	3–1	0–5
Lillestrøm	1–4	2–3	4–0	1–0		2–1	3–1	0–0
Ranheim	0–4	0–3	0–4	1–3	4–0		0–3	1–4
Sarpsborg FK	1–4	4–4	2–4	1–1	1–2	2–0		1–1
Skeid	1–2	1–4	4–1	5–1	3–0	6–1	1–1	

Source: NIFS.no
Legend: Blue = home team win; Yellow = draw; Red = away team win.

== Championship final ==
- Larvik Turn 3–2 Fredrikstad
