= Arne Legernes =

Norwegian footballer (1931–2022)

Personal information
- Date of birth: 18 May 1931
- Place of birth: Molde, Norway
- Date of death: 14 August 2022 (aged 91)
- Place of death: Nesodden, Norway
- Position: Midfielder

Youth career
- 1945–1948: Molde

Senior career*
| Years | Team | Apps | (Gls) |
| 1948–1953 | Molde | | |
| 1954–1955 | Freidig | 18 | (4) |
| 1956–1957 | Molde | | |
| 1958–1962 | Larvik Turn | 62 | (9) |

International career
| 1955–1961 | Norway | 41 | (1) |
- * Club domestic league appearances and goals

Arne Legernes (18 May 1931 – 14 August 2022) was a Norwegian footballer, who played as a midfielder.

He played for Molde, making his senior debut in 1948. His brothers Odd, Bjørn and Tore also played for the club. Because of electrical engineering studies in Trondheim, he transferred to first-tier team Freidig in 1954, but came back to Molde in 1956 and contributed to Molde's promotion to 1957–58 Norwegian Main League. He played one match for Molde in Norwegian Main League against Sandefjord on 28 July 1957, before he moved to Larvik. In Larvik he had gotten a new job and started to play for Larvik Turn, where he played the rest of his active career.

Legernes also played for the Norway national team 41 times and scored one goal.

In 1969, Legernes moved to Asker and became a coach of Stabæk (from 1970 to 1972 and 1982), Asker and Jevnaker (1984–1985).

Legernes died on 14 August 2022, at the age of 89.
