= SK Rapid (Norway) =

Norwegian football club

- Full name: Sportsklubben Rapid
- Founded: 25 August 1925
- Dissolved: 11 February 2011
- Ground: Melløs Stadion
Home colours

Sportsklubben Rapid was a Norwegian association football club located in Moss, Norway that was founded on 25 August 1925.

The club played in Hovedserien, the top league of Norwegian football, in 1955–56, 1956–57, 1959–60 and 1960–61. The club also used to play bandy.

SK Rapid and Athene Moss fielded a cooperative women-team in 2010, and on 11 February 2011 the two clubs merged to form Rapid Athene, and the old clubs ceased to exist.
