= 1985 Molde FK season =

Molde
1985 season
- Chairman: Bernt Roald
- Head coach: Hans Backe
- Stadium: Molde Stadion
- 1. divisjon: 8th
- Norwegian Cup: First Round vs. Clausenengen
- Top goalscorer: League: Rune Ulvestad (6); All: Rune Ulvestad (6)
- Highest home attendance: 3,550 vs Mjøndalen (19 May 1985)
- Lowest home attendance: 1,580 vs Kongsvinger (22 June 1985)
- Average home league attendance: 2,714

The 1985 season was Molde's 11th season in the top flight of Norwegian football. This season Molde competed in 1. divisjon (first tier) and the Norwegian Cup.

In the league, Molde finished in 8th position, 12 points behind winners Roenborg.

Molde participated in the 1985 Norwegian Cup. They were knocked out by Clausenengen in the First Round. The team lost 0–2 in Kristiansund and were eliminated from the competition.

== Squad ==
Source: Note: Flags indicate national team as defined under FIFA eligibility rules; some limited exceptions apply. Players may hold more than one non-FIFA nationality.

No.	Pos.	Nation	Player
—	GK	(Norway) NOR	Inge Bratteteig
—	GK	(Norway) NOR	Pål Husøy
—	DF	(Norway) NOR	Knut Hallvard Eikrem
—	DF	(Norway) NOR	Tor Gunnar Hagbø
—	DF	(Norway) NOR	Åge Hareide
—	DF	(Norway) NOR	Arnfinn Isaksen
—	DF	(Norway) NOR	Ulrich Møller (Captain)
—	MF	(Norway) NOR	Marvin Arnesen
—	MF	(Norway) NOR	Jan Berg
—	MF	(Norway) NOR	Stein Olav Hestad
—	MF	(Norway) NOR	Geir Malmedal

No.	Pos.	Nation	Player
—	MF	(Norway) NOR	Odd Ivar Moen
—	MF	(Norway) NOR	Knut Nesbø
—	MF	(Norway) NOR	Kjetil Rekdal
—	FW	(Norway) NOR	Steinar Henden
—	FW	(Norway) NOR	Rune Ulvestad
—		(Norway) NOR	Geir Heggdal
—		(Norway) NOR	Ove Heggem
—		(Norway) NOR	Rolf René Olsen
—		(Norway) NOR	Terje Sorthe
—		(Norway) NOR	Bjarne Stormyr

== Friendlies ==
1985	Molde	3–0	Brann
CET (UTC+1)	Goal	Report
Note: Nissan Cup

12 January 1985	Molde	2–1	Rosenborg
CET (UTC+1)	Goal	Report	Goal
Note: Nissan Cup

3 February 1985	Vidar	4–1	Molde
CET (UTC+1)	Goal	Report	Goal
Note: Nissan Cup

17 February 1985	Bryne	0–0	Molde
CET (UTC+1)		Report
Note: Nissan Cup

23 February 1985	Viking	0–2	Molde
CET (UTC+1)		Report	Goal
Note: Nissan Cup

2 March 1985	Molde	3–0	Strindheim
CET (UTC+1)	Goal	Report
Note: Nissan Cup

9 March 1985	Djurgården (Sweden)	1–0	(Norway) Molde
CET (UTC+1)	Goal	Report

10 March 1985	Västerås (Sweden)	2–0	(Norway) Molde
CET (UTC+1)	Goal	Report

16 March 1985	Molde	0–3	Hødd
CET (UTC+1)		Report	Goal

23 March 1985	Molde	2–1	Start
CET (UTC+1)	Goal	Report	Goal
Note: Nissan Cup

30 March 1985	Sunndal	0–2	Molde
CET (UTC+1)		Report	Goal

10 April 1985	Sunndal	0–0	Molde
CET (UTC+1)		Report

13 April 1985	Molde	3–0	Steinkjer
CET (UTC+1)	Goal	Report

20 April 1985	Mjøndalen	2–1	Molde
CET (UTC+1)	Goal	Report	Goal
Note: Nissan Cup Final

28 April 1985	Molde	1–2	Kristiansund
CET (UTC+1)	Goal	Report	Goal

13 July 1985	Molde	4–0	Brann	Molde
CET (UTC+1)	Goal	Report		Stadium: Molde Stadion
Note: Tippekamp

20 July 1985	Molde	0–4	Rosenborg	Molde
CET (UTC+1)		Report	Goal	Stadium: Molde Stadion
Note: Tippekamp

27 July 1985	Mjøndalen	2–1	Molde
CET (UTC+1)	Goal	Report	Goal
Note: Tippekamp

== Competitions ==
=== 1. divisjon ===
==== Results summary ====
Overall								Home								Away							
Pld	W	D	L	GF	GA	GD	Pts	Pld	W	D	L	GF	GA	GD	Pts	Pld	W	D	L	GF	GA	GD	Pts
22	7	7	8	25	33	–8	21	11	6	3	2	16	11	+5	15	11	1	4	6	9	22	–13	6

==== Positions by round ====
Round	1	2	3	4	5	6	7	8	9	10	11	12	13	14	15	16	17	18	19	20	21	22
Ground	H	A	H	A	H	A	H	A	H	H	A	A	H	A	H	A	H	A	H	A	A	H
Result	D	L	L	W	W	D	L	L	D	W	L	D	W	D	W	D	W	L	W	L	L	D
Position	8	10	12	8	4	4	8	8	8	8	9	10	8	7	6	6	6	7	6	7	7	8

Source: see below

==== Results ====
6 May 1985 2	Viking	2 – 1	Molde	Stavanger
CET (UTC+1)	Maudal 73', 77'	Report	Berg 74'	Stadium: Stavanger Stadion; Attendance: 5,243

8 May 1985 1	Molde	0 – 0	Eik	Molde
CET (UTC+1)		Report		Stadium: Molde Stadion; Attendance: 2,550
Note: The game was scheduled to be played at 27 April, but was postponned due to weather conditions in Molde.

12 May 1985 3	Molde	1 – 3	Lillestrøm	Molde
CET (UTC+1)	Berg 24'	Report	Osvold 4'; Vaadal 33'; Sundby 56'	Stadium: Molde Stadion; Attendance: 3,250

16 May 1985 4	Vålerengen	0 – 2	Molde	Oslo
CET (UTC+1)		Report	Ulvestad 55'; Berg 57'	Stadium: Bislett Stadion; Attendance: 3,042

19 May 1985 5	Molde	3 – 2	Mjøndalen	Molde
CET (UTC+1)	Ulvestad 13'; Hareide 68'; Berg 76'	Report	Røed 19'; Gulbrandsen 40'	Stadium: Molde Stadion; Attendance: 3,350

27 May 1985 6	Brann	0 – 0	Molde	Bergen
CET (UTC+1)		Report		Stadium: Brann Stadion; Attendance: 10,318

2 June 1985 7	Molde	0 – 2	Rosenborg	Molde
CET (UTC+1)		Report	Brandhaug 68'; Svorkmo 78'	Stadium: Molde Stadion; Attendance: 3,380

9 June 1985 8	Bryne	4 – 0	Molde	Bryne
CET (UTC+1)	Mæland 30'; Folkvord 41'; Kleppa 64'; Madsen 87'	Report		Stadium: Bryne Stadion; Attendance: 2,781

16 June 1985 9	Molde	1 – 1	Start	Molde
CET (UTC+1)	Nesbø 44'	Report	Håberg 76'	Stadium: Molde Stadion; Attendance: 2,420

22 June 1985 10	Molde	1 – 0	Kongsvinger	Molde
CET (UTC+1)	Ulvestad 35'	Report		Stadium: Molde Stadion; Attendance: 1,580

30 June 1985 11	Moss	6 – 2	Molde	Moss
CET (UTC+1)	Nieuwlaat 18'; Fjærestad 23', 31', 61'; Henæs 55'; Tangen 60'	Report	Ulvestad 9'; Arnesen 89'	Stadium: Melløs Stadion; Attendance: 2,278

4 August 1985 12	Eik	1 – 1	Molde	Tønsberg
CET (UTC+1)	Antonsen 42'	Report	Hestad 86'	Stadium: Tønsberg Gressbane; Attendance: 2,119

11 August 1985 13	Molde	3 – 0	Viking	Molde
CET (UTC+1)	Ulvestad 4', 51'; Arnesen 89'	Report		Stadium: Molde Stadion; Attendance: 1,590

18 August 1985 14	Lillestrøm	0 – 0	Molde	Lillestrøm
CET (UTC+1)		Report		Stadium: Åråsen Stadion; Attendance: 4,120

25 August 1985 15	Molde	2 – 0	Vålerengen	Molde
CET (UTC+1)	Hareide 17'; Moen 66'	Report		Stadium: Molde Stadion; Attendance: 2,380

28 August 1985 16	Mjøndalen	0 – 0	Molde	Mjøndalen
CET (UTC+1)		Report		Stadium: Nedre Eiker Stadion; Attendance: 1,778

1 September 1985 17	Molde	2 – 1	Brann	Molde
CET (UTC+1)	Henden 25', 65'	Report	Johannessen 26'	Stadium: Molde Stadion; Attendance: 3,911

8 September 1985 18	Rosenborg	4 – 1	Molde	Trondheim
CET (UTC+1)	Nilssen 12', 60'; Sørloth 19'; Svorkmo 43'	Report	Berg 27'	Stadium: Lerkendal Stadion; Attendance: 6,085

15 September 1985 19	Molde	2 – 1	Bryne	Molde
CET (UTC+1)	Rekdal 30'; Moen 68'	Report	Økland 24'	Stadium: Molde Stadion; Attendance: 2,250

29 September 1985 20	Start	3 – 1	Molde	Kristiansand
CET (UTC+1)	Seland 2', 72'; Lydersen 37'	Report	Hareide 68'	Stadium: Kristiansand Stadion; Attendance: 2,090

6 October 1985 21	Kongsvinger	2 – 1	Molde	Kongsvinger
CET (UTC+1)	Sagen 65'; Sanderud 89'	Report	Henden 13'	Stadium: Gjemselund Stadion; Attendance: 1,879

12 October 1985 22	Molde	1 – 1	Moss	Molde
CET (UTC+1)	Rekdal 17'	Report	Eibakk 85'	Stadium: Molde Stadion; Attendance: 3,350

==== League table ====
Pos	Team	Pld	W	D	L	GF	GA	GD	Pts	Qualification or relegation
6	Start	22	9	3	10	40	44	−4	21	
7	Viking	22	8	5	9	28	36	−8	21	
8	Molde	22	7	7	8	25	33	−8	21	
9	Bryne	22	6	8	8	34	29	+5	20	
10	Moss (R)	22	7	5	10	29	34	−5	19	Qualification for the relegation play-offs

Source: nifs.no
Rules for classification: 1) points; 2) goal difference; 3) number of goals scored.
(R) Relegated

=== Norwegian Cup ===
30 May 1985 First round	Clausenengen	2 – 0	Molde	Kristiansund
CEST (UTC+2)	Unknown; Unknown	Report

== Squad statistics ==
=== Appearances and goals ===
Lacking information:

- Appearance statistics from Norwegian Cup round 1 (11–13 players) are missing.

No.	Pos	Nat	Player	Total		1. divisjon		Norwegian Cup	
No.	Pos	Nat	Player	Apps	Goals	Apps	Goals	Apps	Goals
	MF	(Norway) NOR	Marvin Arnesen	22	2	20+2	2	0	0
	MF	(Norway) NOR	Jan Berg	22	5	22	5	0	0
	GK	(Norway) NOR	Torleif Bergsås	1	0	1	0	0	0
	GK	(Norway) NOR	Inge Bratteteig	16	0	16	0	0	0
	DF	(Norway) NOR	Knut Hallvard Eikrem	22	0	22	0	0	0
	DF	(Norway) NOR	Tor Gunnar Hagbø	11	0	11	0	0	0
	DF	(Norway) NOR	Åge Hareide	22	3	22	3	0	0
		(Norway) NOR	Ove Heggem	1	0	0+1	0	0	0
	FW	(Norway) NOR	Steinar Henden	7	3	3+4	3	0	0
	MF	(Norway) NOR	Stein Olav Hestad	18	1	17+1	1	0	0
	GK	(Norway) NOR	Pål Husøy	6	0	5+1	0	0	0
	DF	(Norway) NOR	Arnfinn Isaksen	11	0	11	0	0	0
	MF	(Norway) NOR	Geir Malmedal	5	0	3+2	0	0	0
	MF	(Norway) NOR	Odd Ivar Moen	20	2	17+3	2	0	0
	DF	(Norway) NOR	Ulrich Møller	22	0	22	0	0	0
	MF	(Norway) NOR	Knut Nesbø	18	1	12+6	1	0	0
		(Norway) NOR	Rolf René Olsen	5	0	2+3	0	0	0
	MF	(Norway) NOR	Kjetil Rekdal	13	2	13	2	0	0
		(Norway) NOR	Terje Sorthe	6	0	2+4	0	0	0
		(Norway) NOR	Bjarne Stormyr	2	0	2	0	0	0
	FW	(Norway) NOR	Rune Ulvestad	22	6	19+3	6	0	0

=== Goalscorers ===
Rank	Position	Nat.	Player	1. divisjon	Norwegian Cup	Total
1	FW	(Norway)	Rune Ulvestad	6	0	6
2	MF	(Norway)	Jan Berg	5	0	5
3	DF	(Norway)	Åge Hareide	3	0	3
3	FW	(Norway)	Steinar Henden	3	0	3
5	MF	(Norway)	Marvin Arnesen	2	0	2
5	MF	(Norway)	Odd Ivar Moen	2	0	2
5	MF	(Norway)	Kjetil Rekdal	2	0	2
8	MF	(Norway)	Stein Olav Hestad	1	0	1
8	MF	(Norway)	Knut Nesbø	1	0	1
			TOTALS	25	0	25

== See also ==
- Molde FK seasons
