= 1986 Molde FK season =

Molde
1986 season
- Chairman: Nils Olav Kringstad
- Head coaches: Åge Hareide; Harry Hestad
- Stadium: Molde Stadion
- 1. divisjon: 9th
- Norwegian Cup: Third Round vs. Hødd
- Top goalscorer: League: Kjetil Rekdal (6); All: Kjetil Rekdal (8)
- Highest home attendance: 5,350 vs Lillestrøm (19 October 1986)
- Lowest home attendance: 100 vs Åndalsnes (23 June 1986)
- Average home league attendance: 2,702

The 1986 season was Molde's 12th season in the top flight of Norwegian football. This season Molde competed in 1. divisjon (first tier) and the Norwegian Cup.

In the league, Molde finished in 9th position, 13 points behind winners Lillestrøm.

Molde participated in the 1986 Norwegian Cup. They reached the Third Round where they lost 0–2 away against Hødd and were eliminated from the competition.

== Squad ==
Source: Note: Flags indicate national team as defined under FIFA eligibility rules; some limited exceptions apply. Players may hold more than one non-FIFA nationality.

No.	Pos.	Nation	Player
—	GK	(Norway) NOR	Inge Bratteteig
—	GK	(Norway) NOR	Pål Husøy
—	DF	(Norway) NOR	Knut Hallvard Eikrem
—	DF	(Norway) NOR	Tor Gunnar Hagbø
—	DF	(Norway) NOR	Åge Hareide
—	DF	(Norway) NOR	Ulrich Møller (Captain)
—	DF	(Norway) NOR	Geir Sperre
—	DF	(Norway) NOR	Ole Erik Stavrum
—	MF	(Norway) NOR	Marvin Arnesen
—	MF	(Norway) NOR	Jan Berg
—	MF	(Norway) NOR	Stein Olav Hestad

No.	Pos.	Nation	Player
—	MF	(Norway) NOR	Geir Malmedal
—	MF	(Norway) NOR	Odd Ivar Moen
—	MF	(Norway) NOR	Kjetil Rekdal
—	FW	(Norway) NOR	Johan Høgset
—	FW	(Norway) NOR	Rune Ulvestad
—		(Norway) NOR	Børre Bjørsvik
—		(Norway) NOR	Geir Heggdal
—		(Norway) NOR	Robert Kleve
—		(Norway) NOR	Jøran Nyheim
—		(Norway) NOR	Tommy Undhjem
—		(Norway) NOR	Erlend Vestre

== Friendlies ==
18 January 1986	Molde	7–1	Sunndal
CET (UTC+1)	Goal	Report	Goal

25 January 1986	Molde	3–1	Sogndal
CET (UTC+1)	Goal	Report	Goal
Note: Nissan Cup

1 February 1986	Rosenborg	2–3	Molde
CET (UTC+1)	Goal	Report	Goal
Note: Nissan Cup

28 February 1986	Molde	0–2	Clausenengen
CET (UTC+1)		Report	Goal

8 March 1986	Molde	2–0	Sunndal
CET (UTC+1)	Goal	Report

13 March 1986	Brann	0–0	Molde
CET (UTC+1)		Report
Note: Nissan Cup

19 March 1986	Molde	5–1	Viking
CET (UTC+1)	Goal	Report	Goal
Note: Nissan Cup

22 March 1986	Molde	0–1	Bryne
CET (UTC+1)		Report	Goal
Note: Nissan Cup

26 March 1986	Molde	2–1	Hødd
CET (UTC+1)	Goal	Report	Goal

2 April 1986	Molde	0–1	Rosenborg
CET (UTC+1)		Report	Goal

5 April 1986	Kristiansund	3–0	Molde
CET (UTC+1)	Goal	Report

7 April 1986	Molde	2–1	Strømsgodset
CET (UTC+1)	Goal	Report	Goal

12 April 1986	Aalesund	0–1	Molde
CET (UTC+1)		Report	Goal

16 April 1986	Åndalsnes	1–3	Molde
CET (UTC+1)	Goal	Report	Goal

19 April 1986	Molde	1–2	Faaberg
CET (UTC+1)	Goal	Report	Goal

12 July 1986	Molde	3–2	Bryne	Molde
CET (UTC+1)	Moen 34', 75'; Rekdal 57'	Report	Unknown 24'; Unknown 82'	Stadium: Molde Stadion
Note: Tippekamp

19 July 1986	Tromsø	1–0	Molde	Tromsø
CET (UTC+1)	Unknown 34'	Report		Stadium: Vallhall Stadion
Note: Tippekamp

26 July 1986	Molde	2–1	Skeid	Molde
CET (UTC+1)	Moen 55'; Ulvestad ?'	Report	Unknown 65' (pen.)	Stadium: Molde Stadion
Note: Tippekamp

28 July 1986	Clausenengen	3–3	Molde	Kristiansund
CET (UTC+1)	Unknown 6'; Unknown 21'; Unknown 60'	Report	Høgset 26'; Stavrum 54'; Møller 65'	Stadium: Atlanten Stadion; Attendance: 300

== Competitions ==
=== 1. divisjon ===
==== Results summary ====
Overall								Home								Away							
Pld	W	D	L	GF	GA	GD	Pts	Pld	W	D	L	GF	GA	GD	Pts	Pld	W	D	L	GF	GA	GD	Pts
22	7	6	9	26	33	–7	20	11	2	3	6	11	21	–10	7	11	5	3	3	15	12	+3	13

==== Positions by round ====
Round	1	2	3	4	5	6	7	8	9	10	11	12	13	14	15	16	17	18	19	20	21	22
Ground	A	H	A	H	A	H	H	A	H	A	H	A	A	H	A	H	A	H	A	H	A	H
Result	D	L	D	W	L	L	L	W	L	L	D	L	D	L	W	D	W	W	W	D	W	L
Position	4	10	10	8	9	10	10	10	10	10	10	11	10	10	10	10	10	9	9	9	9	9

Source: see below

==== Results ====
27 April 1986 1	HamKam	1 – 1	Molde	Hamar
CET (UTC+1)	Jacobsen 65'	Report	Unknown 69' (o.g.)	Stadium: Briskeby; Attendance: 4,607

4 May 1986 2	Molde	0 – 4	Start	Molde
CET (UTC+1)		Report	Seland 30', 89'; Trædal 50'; Mathisen 69'	Stadium: Molde Stadion; Attendance: 3,250

8 May 1986 3	Kongsvinger	0 – 0	Molde	Kongsvinger
CET (UTC+1)		Report		Stadium: Gjemselund Stadion; Attendance: 2,590

11 May 1986 4	Molde	2 – 0	Viking	Molde
CET (UTC+1)	Bjørsvik 18'; Moen 89'	Report		Stadium: Molde Stadion; Attendance: 2,250

19 May 1986 6	Molde	1 – 4	Strømmen	Molde
CET (UTC+1)	Hareide 72' (pen.)	Report	Steinlein 5'; Kallstad 20'; Johansen 56'; Unknown 78'	Stadium: Molde Stadion; Attendance: 2,280

31 May 1986 7	Molde	1 – 2	Vålerengen	Molde
CET (UTC+1)	Hareide 47'	Report	Davidsen 66'; Johansen 87'	Stadium: Molde Stadion; Attendance: 1,350

7 June 1986 8	Tromsø	0 – 2	Molde	Tromsø
CET (UTC+1)		Report	Berg 33'; Moen 82'	Stadium: Valhall Stadion; Attendance: 3,200

14 June 1986 9	Molde	1 – 3	Bryne	Molde
CET (UTC+1)	Høgset 37'	Report	Folkvord 65'; Fjeldstad 83'; Madsen 88'	Stadium: Molde Stadion; Attendance: 1,560

18 June 1986 5	Mjøndalen	2 – 0	Molde	Mjøndalen
CET (UTC+1)	Aulie 2'; Steinsholt 56'	Report		Stadium: Nedre Eiker Stadion; Attendance: 749

26 June 1986 10	Lillestrøm	3 – 0	Molde	Lillestrøm
CET (UTC+1)	Richardsen 20'; Håberg 48', 79'	Report		Stadium: Åråsen Stadion; Attendance: 1,112

3 August 1986 11	Molde	2 – 2	HamKam	Molde
CET (UTC+1)	Hestad 65'; Rekdal 71'	Report	Fjørtoft 8'; Skogheim 67'	Stadium: Molde Stadion; Attendance: 2,250

10 August 1986 12	Start	1 – 0	Molde	Kristiansand
CET (UTC+1)	Mathisen 86'	Report		Stadium: Kristiansand Stadion; Attendance: 3,019

13 August 1986 13	Rosenborg	1 – 1	Molde	Trondheim
CET (UTC+1)	Sørloth 73'	Report	Høgset 78'	Stadium: Lerkendal Stadion; Attendance: 4,983

17 August 1986 14	Molde	0 – 2	Kongsvinger	Molde
CET (UTC+1)		Report	Hagaløkken 15'; Nystuen 74'	Stadium: Molde Stadion; Attendance: 2,450

24 August 1986 15	Viking	0 – 2	Molde	Stavanger
CET (UTC+1)		Report	Rekdal 20', 72'	Stadium: Stavanger Stadion; Attendance: 4,623

31 August 1986 16	Molde	2 – 2	Mjøndalen	Molde
CET (UTC+1)	Ulvestad 11'; Arnesen 66'	Report	Markussen 35'; Ørbeck 58'	Stadium: Molde Stadion; Attendance: 2,230

7 September 1986 17	Strømmen	1 – 3	Molde	Strømmen
CET (UTC+1)	Johansen 26'	Report	Berg ?'; Ulvestad ?', 42'	Stadium: Strømmen Stadion; Attendance: 1,114

14 September 1986 18	Molde	1 – 0	Rosenborg	Molde
CET (UTC+1)	Eggen 10' (o.g.)	Report		Stadium: Molde Stadion; Attendance: 2,960

27 September 1986 19	Vålerengen	2 – 3	Molde	Oslo
CET (UTC+1)	Løberg 1'; Johansen 8'	Report	Rekdal 21'; Hareide 52'; Høgset 72'	Stadium: Bislett Stadion; Attendance: 1,057

5 October 1986 20	Molde	1 – 1	Tromsø	Molde
CET (UTC+1)	Rekdal 85'	Report	Rismo 59'	Stadium: Molde Stadion; Attendance: 3,500

12 October 1986 21	Bryne	1 – 3	Molde	Bryne
CET (UTC+1)	Økland 62'	Report	Rekdal 22'; Berg 51'; Ulvestad 59'	Stadium: Bryne Stadion; Attendance: 2,752

19 October 1986 22	Molde	0 – 1	Lillestrøm	Molde
CET (UTC+1)		Report	Krogsæter 12'	Stadium: Molde Stadion; Attendance: 5,350

==== League table ====
Pos	Team	Pld	W	D	L	GF	GA	GD	Pts	Qualification or relegation
1	Lillestrøm (C)	22	16	1	5	40	17	+23	33	Qualification for the European Cup first round
2	Mjøndalen	22	11	5	6	36	25	+11	27	Qualification for the UEFA Cup first round
3	Kongsvinger	22	11	5	6	27	27	0	27	
4	Start	22	9	6	7	31	22	+9	24	
5	HamKam	22	8	8	6	34	30	+4	24	
6	Bryne	22	11	1	10	32	31	+1	23	
7	Vålerengen	22	9	4	9	29	28	+1	22	
8	Rosenborg	22	8	5	9	28	28	0	21	
9	Molde	22	7	6	9	26	33	−7	20	
10	Tromsø (Note: Tromsø qualified for the UEFA Cup Winners' Cup as Norwegian Cup winners.) (O)	22	6	6	10	23	32	−9	18	Cup Winners' Cup first round and relegation play-offs
11	Viking (R)	22	5	7	10	23	33	−10	17	Relegation to Second Division
12	Strømmen (R)	22	2	4	16	23	46	−23	8	Relegation to Second Division

Source: nifs.no
(C) Champions; (O) Play-off winners; (R) Relegated

=== Norwegian Cup ===
11 June 1986 First round	Træff	0 – 5	Molde	Molde
CEST (UTC+2)		Report	Unknown; Rekdal 21' (pen.), 77'; Hareide 60'; Høgset 70'	Attendance: 200

23 June 1986 Second round	Molde	1 – 0	Åndalsnes	Molde
CEST (UTC+2)	Sperre 35'	Report		Stadium: Molde Stadion; Attendance: 100

2 July 1986 Third round	Hødd	2 – 0	Molde	Ulsteinvik
CEST (UTC+2)	Unknown; Unknown	Report		Stadium: Høddvoll Stadion

== Squad statistics ==
=== Appearances and goals ===
Lacking information:

- Appearance statistics from Norwegian Cup rounds 1–3 (7–9 players in rounds 1–2 and 11–13 players in round 3) and one goalscorer from round 1 are missing.

No.	Pos	Nat	Player	Total		1. divisjon		Norwegian Cup	
No.	Pos	Nat	Player	Apps	Goals	Apps	Goals	Apps	Goals
	MF	(Norway) NOR	Marvin Arnesen	16	1	14+2	1	0	0
	MF	(Norway) NOR	Jan Berg	23	3	22	3	1	0
		(Norway) NOR	Børre Bjørsvik	6	1	2+4	1	0	0
	GK	(Norway) NOR	Inge Bratteteig	20	0	20	0	0	0
	DF	(Norway) NOR	Knut Hallvard Eikrem	22	0	22	0	0	0
	DF	(Norway) NOR	Tor Gunnar Hagbø	11	0	6+5	0	0	0
	DF	(Norway) NOR	Åge Hareide	19	4	18	3	1	1
	MF	(Norway) NOR	Stein Olav Hestad	19	1	17+1	1	1	0
	GK	(Norway) NOR	Pål Husøy	2	0	2	0	0	0
	FW	(Norway) NOR	Johan Høgset	18	4	10+7	3	1	1
	MF	(Norway) NOR	Geir Malmedal	13	0	8+4	0	1	0
	MF	(Norway) NOR	Odd Ivar Moen	18	2	13+5	2	0	0
	DF	(Norway) NOR	Ulrich Møller	22	0	22	0	0	0
		(Norway) NOR	Jøran Nyheim	1	0	0+1	0	0	0
	MF	(Norway) NOR	Kjetil Rekdal	24	8	21+1	6	2	2
	DF	(Norway) NOR	Geir Sperre	20	1	16+3	0	1	1
	DF	(Norway) NOR	Ole Erik Stavrum	17	0	17	0	0	0
	FW	(Norway) NOR	Rune Ulvestad	13	4	12+1	4	0	0
		(Norway) NOR	Tommy Unhjem	1	0	0+1	0	0	0

=== Goalscorers ===
Rank	Position	Nat.	Player	1. divisjon	Norwegian Cup	Total
1	MF	(Norway)	Kjetil Rekdal	6	2	8
2	FW	(Norway)	Rune Ulvestad	4	0	4
2	DF	(Norway)	Åge Hareide	3	1	4
2	FW	(Norway)	Johan Høgset	3	1	4
5	MF	(Norway)	Jan Berg	3	0	3
6	MF	(Norway)	Odd Ivar Moen	2	0	2
7	MF	(Norway)	Marvin Arnesen	1	0	1
7		(Norway)	Børre Bjørsvik	1	0	1
7	MF	(Norway)	Stein Olav Hestad	1	0	1
7	DF	(Norway)	Geir Sperre	0	1	1
			Unknown	0	1	1
			Own goals	2	0	2
			TOTALS	24	6	30

== See also ==
- Molde FK seasons
