= 1987 Molde FK season =

Molde
1987 season
- Chairman: Nils Olav Kringstad
- Head coaches: Åge Hareide; Harry Hestad
- Stadium: Molde Stadion
- 1. divisjon: 2nd
- Norwegian Cup: Third Round vs. Sunndal
- Top goalscorer: League: Jan Berg (7); Kjetil Rekdal (7); All: Kjetil Rekdal (12)
- Highest home attendance: 14,793 vs Moss (10 October 1987)
- Lowest home attendance: 796 vs Langevåg (24 June 1987)
- Average home league attendance: 4,431

The 1987 season was Molde's 13th season in the top flight of Norwegian football. This season Molde competed in 1. divisjon (first tier) and the Norwegian Cup.

In the league, Molde finished in 2nd position, 3 points behind winners Moss. On 10 October, Molde met Moss at Molde Stadion in the final round of the season. They would have become champions if they had defeated Moss, but lost the game 0–2. The match attended 14,973 spectators, which is the all-time home attendance record for Molde FK.

Molde participated in the 1987 Norwegian Cup. They reached the Third Round where they lost 0–2 away against Sunndal and were eliminated from the competition.

== Squad ==
Source: Note: Flags indicate national team as defined under FIFA eligibility rules; some limited exceptions apply. Players may hold more than one non-FIFA nationality.

No.	Pos.	Nation	Player
—	GK	(Norway) NOR	Inge Bratteteig
—	GK	(Norway) NOR	Thor André Olsen
—	DF	(Norway) NOR	Even Blakstad
—	DF	(Norway) NOR	Knut Hallvard Eikrem
—	DF	(Norway) NOR	Tor Gunnar Hagbø
—	DF	(Norway) NOR	Åge Hareide
—	DF	(Norway) NOR	Lasse Møller
—	DF	(Norway) NOR	Ulrich Møller (Captain)
—	DF	(Norway) NOR	Geir Sperre
—	DF	(Norway) NOR	Ole Erik Stavrum

No.	Pos.	Nation	Player
—	MF	(Norway) NOR	Marvin Arnesen
—	MF	(Norway) NOR	Jan Berg
—	MF	(Norway) NOR	Stein Olav Hestad
—	MF	(Norway) NOR	Kjetil Rekdal
—	MF	(Norway) NOR	Finn Renna
—	FW	(Norway) NOR	Jostein Flo
—	FW	(Norway) NOR	Johan Høgset
—	FW	(Norway) NOR	Øystein Neerland
—		(Norway) NOR	Geir Heggdal
—		(Norway) NOR	Atle Strande

== Friendlies ==
17 January 1987	Molde	2–0	Bud	Molde
CET (UTC+1)	Goal	Report		Stadium: Lubbenes kunstgress

23 January 1987	Molde	7–0	Kristiansund	Molde
CET (UTC+1)	Goal	Report		Stadium: Lubbenes kunstgress

31 January 1987	Molde	4–0	Langevåg	Molde
CET (UTC+1)	Goal	Report		Stadium: Lubbenes kunstgress

7 February 1987	Tromsø	0–1	Molde
CET (UTC+1)		Report	Goal
Note: Nissan Cup

14 February 1987	Molde	4–1	Vidar
CET (UTC+1)	Goal	Report	Goal
Note: Nissan Cup

21 February 1987	Molde	3–0	Kristiansund	Molde
CET (UTC+1)	Goal	Report		Stadium: Lubbenes kunstgress

28 February 1987	Molde	3–0	Faaberg	Molde
CET (UTC+1)	Goal	Report		Stadium: Lubbenes kunstgress

7 March 1987	Molde	1–0	Start
CET (UTC+1)	Goal	Report
Note: Nissan Cup

13 March 1987	Brann	0–2	Molde
CET (UTC+1)		Report	Goal
Note: Nissan Cup

14 March 1987	Clausenengen	0–2	Molde	Kristiansund
CET (UTC+1)		Report	Goal

15 March 1987	Aalesund	1–2	Molde	Kristiansund
CET (UTC+1)	Goal	Report	Goal

18 March 1987	Rosenborg	0–2	Molde
CET (UTC+1)		Report	Goal
Note: Nissan Cup

28 March 1987	Molde	1–0	Bryne
CET (UTC+1)	Goal	Report
Note: Nissan Cup

1 April 1987	Skarbøvik	0–8	Molde
CET (UTC+1)		Report	Goal

4 April 1987	Viking	0–0	Molde
CET (UTC+1)		Report
Note: Nissan Cup

6 April 1987	RVC	3–2	Molde	The Hague, Netherlands
CET (UTC+1)	Goal	Report	Goal

7 April 1987	Wilhelmers	3–2	Molde	The Hague, Netherlands
CET (UTC+1)	Goal	Report	Goal

9 April 1987	AFC	1–0	Molde	The Hague, Netherlands
CET (UTC+1)	Goal	Report

10 April 1987	HBS	1–4	Molde	The Hague, Netherlands
CET (UTC+1)	Goal	Report	Goal

20 April 1987	Molde	4–0	Moss
CET (UTC+1)	Goal	Report
Note: Nissan Cup Final

== Competitions ==
=== 1. divisjon ===
==== Results summary ====
Overall									Home									Away								
Pld	W	DW	DL	L	GF	GA	GD	Pts	Pld	W	DW	DL	L	GF	GA	GD	Pts	Pld	W	DW	DL	L	GF	GA	GD	Pts
22	11	3	2	6	27	20	+7	41	11	6	1	2	2	15	9	+6	22	11	5	2	0	4	12	11	+1	19

==== Positions by round ====
Round	1	2	3	4	5	6	7	8	9	10	11	12	13	14	15	16	17	18	19	20	21	22
Ground	H	A	H	A	H	A	H	A	A	H	A	A	H	A	H	A	H	A	H	H	A	H
Result	L	L	W	DW	DL	W	DW	W	W	DL	L	W	W	DW	W	L	W	W	W	W	L	L
Position	8	12	10	8	10	6	5	3	3	3	5	4	4	3	2	3	2	2	2	1	2	2

Source: see below

==== Results ====
2 May 1987 1	Molde	1 – 2	Start	Molde
CET (UTC+1)	Berg 81'	Report	Maridal 44'; Mathisen 55'	Stadium: Molde Stadion; Attendance: 3,860; Referee: Thorodd Presberg

9 May 1987 2	Bryne	2 – 1	Molde	Bryne
CET (UTC+1)	Økland 15'; Ekker 19'	Report	Berg 79'	Stadium: Bryne Stadion; Attendance: 2,545; Referee: Harald Hansen

16 May 1987 3	Molde	1 – 0	Mjøndalen	Molde
CET (UTC+1)	Flo 90'	Report		Stadium: Molde Stadion; Attendance: 2,650; Referee: Thorbjørn Aass

20 May 1987 4	Tromsø	0 – 0 (5–6 p)	Molde	Tromsø
CET (UTC+1)		Report		Stadium: Alfheim Stadion; Attendance: 2,975; Referee: Sven Kjelbrott

23 May 1987 5	Molde	1 – 1 (1–3 p)	Kongsvinger	Molde
CET (UTC+1)	Hareide 59'	Report	Faldmo 63'	Stadium: Molde Stadion; Attendance: 2,545; Referee: Lars Kåre Rogne

8 June 1987 6	Vålerengen	1 – 2	Molde	Oslo
CET (UTC+1)	Skjærvik 88'	Report	Rekdal 31', 52'	Stadium: Bislett Stadion; Attendance: 2,611; Referee: Per-Arne Larsgård

13 June 1987 7	Molde	1 – 1 (4–2 p)	Rosenborg	Molde
CET (UTC+1)	Rekdal 76'	Report	Brandhaug 30'	Stadium: Molde Stadion; Attendance: 3,200; Referee: Erling Haugen

20 June 1987 8	HamKam	0 – 2	Molde	Hamar
CET (UTC+1)		Report	Neerland 4', 56'	Stadium: Briskeby; Attendance: 2,201; Referee: Jan Erik Olsen

27 June 1987 9	Brann	0 – 2	Molde	Bergen
CET (UTC+1)		Report	Neerland 58'; Arnesen 86'	Stadium: Brann Stadion; Attendance: 6,873; Referee: Kaare Lindboe

4 July 1987 10	Molde	0 – 0 (7–8 p)	Lillestrøm	Molde
CET (UTC+1)		Report		Stadium: Molde Stadion; Attendance: 4,025

11 July 1987 11	Moss	5 – 0	Molde	Moss
CET (UTC+1)	Henæs 30'; Bachke 31', 80'; Gislason 37'; Fjærestad 81'	Report		Stadium: Melløs Stadion; Attendance: 2,653

18 July 1987 12	Start	0 – 2	Molde	Kristiansand
CET (UTC+1)		Report	Rekdal 52', 79'	Stadium: Kristiansand Stadion; Attendance: 1,070

8 August 1987 13	Molde	1 – 0	Bryne	Molde
CET (UTC+1)	Flo 25'	Report		Stadium: Molde Stadion; Attendance: 3,260

15 August 1987 14	Mjøndalen	0 – 0 (4–5 p)	Molde	Mjøndalen
CET (UTC+1)		Report		Stadium: Nedre Eiker Stadion; Attendance: 1,801

22 August 1987 15	Molde	2 – 1	Tromsø	Molde
CET (UTC+1)	Berg 25', 75'	Report	Rismo 13'	Stadium: Molde Stadion; Attendance: 3,260

29 August 1987 16	Kongsvinger	1 – 0	Molde	Kongsvinger
CET (UTC+1)	Holtet 87'	Report		Stadium: Gjemselund Stadion; Attendance: 1,757

5 September 1987 17	Molde	4 – 0	Vålerengen	Molde
CET (UTC+1)	Neerland 18', 51'; Rekdal 78'; Berg 80'	Report		Stadium: Molde Stadion; Attendance: 3,125

12 September 1987 18	Rosenborg	0 – 2	Molde	Trondheim
CET (UTC+1)		Report	Hagbø 31'; Arnesen 33'	Stadium: Lerkendal Stadion; Attendance: 5,927

16 September 1987 19	Molde	2 – 1	HamKam	Molde
CET (UTC+1)	Neerland 34'; Stavrum 85'	Report	Eikebråten 29'	Stadium: Molde Stadion; Attendance: 4,160

26 September 1987 20	Molde	2 – 1	Brann	Molde
CET (UTC+1)	Berg 39', 83'	Report	Møller 30'	Stadium: Molde Stadion; Attendance: 3,860

3 October 1987 21	Lillestrøm	2 – 1	Molde	Lillestrøm
CET (UTC+1)	Håberg 22'; Larsen 39'	Report	Rekdal 31'	Stadium: Åråsen Stadion; Attendance: 4,680

10 October 1987 22	Molde	0 – 2	Moss	Molde
CET (UTC+1)		Report	Bachke 59'; Henæs 89'	Stadium: Molde Stadion; Attendance: 14,793

==== League table ====
Pos	Team	Pld	W	PKW	PKL	L	GF	GA	GD	Pts	Qualification or relegation
1	Moss (C)	22	13	2	1	6	44	30	+14	44	Qualification for the European Cup first round
2	Molde	22	11	3	2	6	27	20	+7	41	Qualification for the UEFA Cup first round
3	Kongsvinger	22	9	4	4	5	32	22	+10	39	
4	Rosenborg	22	8	4	7	3	33	25	+8	39	
5	Bryne	22	11	0	1	10	32	27	+5	34	Qualification for the Cup Winners' Cup preliminary round
6	Tromsø	22	5	7	2	8	19	31	−12	31	
7	Vålerengen	22	8	1	4	9	26	27	−1	30	
8	Brann	22	7	3	3	9	25	28	−3	30	
9	Lillestrøm	22	7	3	2	10	22	21	+1	29	
10	HamKam (R)	22	7	3	2	10	27	34	−7	29	Qualification for the relegation play-offs
11	Mjøndalen (R)	22	6	2	3	11	26	34	−8	25	Relegation to the Second Division
12	Start (R)	22	6	2	3	11	30	44	−14	25	Relegation to the Second Division

Source: nifs.no
(C) Champion; (R) Relegated

=== Norwegian Cup ===
30 May 1987 First round	Kristiansund	1 – 3 (a.e.t.)	Molde	Kristiansund
CEST (UTC+2)	Unknown	Report	Neerland 34', ?'; Flo ?'	Attendance: 1,200

24 June 1987 Second round	Molde	11 – 0	Langevåg	Molde
CEST (UTC+2)	Rekdal; Arnesen; Møller; Neerland; Rekdal; Rekdal; Rekdal; Neerland; Bratteteig ?' (pen.); Rekdal; Arnesen	Report		Stadium: Molde Stadion; Attendance: 796

8 July 1987 Third round	Sunndal	2 – 0	Molde	Sunndalsøra
CEST (UTC+2)	Torve; Øien	Report

== Squad statistics ==
=== Appearances and goals ===
Lacking information:

- Appearance statistics from Norwegian Cup rounds 2 (6–8 players) and 3 (8–10 players) are missing.

No.	Pos	Nat	Player	Total		1. divisjon		Norwegian Cup	
No.	Pos	Nat	Player	Apps	Goals	Apps	Goals	Apps	Goals
	MF	(Norway) NOR	Marvin Arnesen	23	4	21	2	2	2
	MF	(Norway) NOR	Jan Berg	22	7	20	7	2	0
	DF	(Norway) NOR	Even Blakstad	1	0	0+1	0	0	0
	GK	(Norway) NOR	Inge Bratteteig	13	1	10+1	0	2	1
	DF	(Norway) NOR	Knut Hallvard Eikrem	22	0	21	0	1	0
	FW	(Norway) NOR	Jostein Flo	21	3	18+1	2	2	1
	DF	(Norway) NOR	Tor Gunnar Hagbø	23	1	22	1	1	0
	DF	(Norway) NOR	Åge Hareide	15	1	8+7	1	0	0
	MF	(Norway) NOR	Stein Olav Hestad	16	0	13+3	0	0	0
	FW	(Norway) NOR	Johan Høgset	14	0	0+13	0	0+1	0
	FW	(Norway) NOR	Odd Ivar Moen	1	0	0	0	0+1	0
	DF	(Norway) NOR	Lasse Møller	3	0	1+2	0	0	0
	DF	(Norway) NOR	Ulrich Møller	24	1	21	0	3	1
	FW	(Norway) NOR	Øystein Neerland	23	10	20+1	6	2	4
	GK	(Norway) NOR	Thor André Olsen	13	0	13	0	0	0
	MF	(Norway) NOR	Kjetil Rekdal	20	12	19	7	1	5
	MF	(Norway) NOR	Finn Renna	14	0	6+8	0	0	0
	DF	(Norway) NOR	Geir Sperre	13	0	9+3	0	1	0
	DF	(Norway) NOR	Ole Erik Stavrum	22	1	21	1	1	0

=== Goalscorers ===
Rank	Position	Nat.	Player	1. divisjon	Norwegian Cup	Total
1	MF	(Norway)	Kjetil Rekdal	7	5	12
2	FW	(Norway)	Øystein Neerland	6	4	10
3	MF	(Norway)	Jan Berg	7	0	7
4	MF	(Norway)	Marvin Arnesen	2	2	4
5	FW	(Norway)	Jostein Flo	2	1	3
6	DF	(Norway)	Tor Gunnar Hagbø	1	0	1
6	DF	(Norway)	Åge Hareide	1	0	1
6	DF	(Norway)	Ole Erik Stavrum	1	0	1
6	GK	(Norway)	Inge Bratteteig	0	1	1
6	DF	(Norway)	Ulrich Møller	0	1	1
			TOTALS	27	14	41

== See also ==
- Molde FK seasons
