= 1984 Molde FK season =

Molde
1984 season
- Chairman: Bernt Roald
- Head coach: Jan Fuglset (until 21 July 1984); Joseph Hooley (from 22 July 1984)
- Stadium: Molde Stadion
- 1. divisjon: 8th
- Norwegian Cup: Fourth Round vs. Rosenborg
- Top goalscorer: League: Stein Olav Hestad (6); Rune Ulvestad (6); All: Rune Ulvestad (10)
- Highest home attendance: 5,149 vs Rosenborg (21 August 1984)
- Lowest home attendance: 485 vs Spjelkavik (30 May 1984)
- Average home league attendance: 3,345

The 1984 season was Molde's 10th season in the top flight of Norwegian football and their first since their promotion from 2. divisjon in 1983. This season Molde competed in 1. divisjon (first tier) and the Norwegian Cup.

In the league, Molde finished in 8th position, 11 points behind winners Vålerengen.

Molde participated in the 1984 Norwegian Cup. They were knocked out by Rosenborg in the Fourth Round. The team lost 2–7 at Molde Stadion and were eliminated from the competition.

== Squad ==
Source: Note: Flags indicate national team as defined under FIFA eligibility rules; some limited exceptions apply. Players may hold more than one non-FIFA nationality.

No.	Pos.	Nation	Player
—	GK	NOR	Inge Bratteteig
—	GK	NOR	Bjørnar Myking
—	DF	NOR	Alf Gunnar Dahl
—	DF	NOR	Knut Hallvard Eikrem
—	DF	NOR	Tor Gunnar Hagbø
—	DF	NOR	Åge Hareide
—	DF	NOR	Ulrich Møller (Captain)
—	DF	NOR	Bertil Stranden
—	MF	NOR	Per Arne Aase
—	MF	NOR	Jan Berg
—	MF	NOR	Stein Olav Hestad

No.	Pos.	Nation	Player
—	MF	NOR	Geir Malmedal
—	MF	NOR	Knut Nesbø
—	FW	NOR	Steinar Henden
—	FW	NOR	Rune Ulvestad
—		NOR	Børre Bjørsvik
—		NOR	Lars Tore Brandeggen
—		NOR	Ove Heggem
—		NOR	Tore Jermstad
—		NOR	Stig Monsen
—		NOR	Einar Sekkeseter
—		NOR	Terje Sorthe

== Friendlies ==
4 February 1984	Molde	7–1	Rival	Molde
CET (UTC+1)	Goal	Report	Goal

11 February 1984	Molde	1–1	Åndalsnes
CET (UTC+1)	Goal	Report	Goal

15 February 1984	Molde	2–2	Kristiansund
CET (UTC+1)	Goal	Report	Goal

18 February 1984	Molde	7–0	Sunndal
CET (UTC+1)	Goal	Report

3 March 1984	Molde	2–2	Steinkjer
CET (UTC+1)	Goal	Report	Goal

11 March 1984	Molde	2–1	Hødd
CET (UTC+1)	Goal	Report	Goal

17 March 1984	Molde	2–2	Sunndal
CET (UTC+1)	Goal	Report	Goal

24 March 1984	Molde	1–1	Rosenborg
CET (UTC+1)	Goal	Report	Goal

31 March 1984	Aalesund	1–6	Molde
CET (UTC+1)	Goal	Report	Goal

10 April 1984	Cambridge United (England)	2–4	(Norway) Molde
CET (UTC+1)	Goal	Report	Goal

13 April 1984	Molde	1–3	Lillestrøm
CET (UTC+1)	Goal	Report	Goal

18 April 1984	Åndalsnes	3–1	Molde
CET (UTC+1)	Goal	Report	Goal

23 April 1984	Sogndal	0–2	Molde
CET (UTC+1)		Report	Goal

1984	Molde	0–1	Kongsvinger	Molde
CET (UTC+1)		Report	Unknown 44'	Stadium: Molde Stadion; Attendance: 900
Note: Tippecup

21 July 1984	Molde	1–6	Moss	Molde
CET (UTC+1)	Henden 85'	Report	Unknown; Unknown; Unknown; Unknown; Unknown; Unknown	Stadium: Molde Stadion
Note: Tippecup

27 July 1984	Rosenborg	4–2	Molde	Molde
CET (UTC+1)	Unknown 20'; Brandhaug 43' (pen.); Unknown 53'; Unknown 65'	Report	Nesbø 35'; Møller 89'	Stadium: Molde Stadion; Attendance: 400
Note: Tippekamp

1984	Molde	5–0	Rival	Molde
CET (UTC+1)	Unknown; Unknown; Unknown; Unknown; Unknown	Report

== Competitions ==
=== 1. divisjon ===
==== Results summary ====
Overall								Home								Away							
Pld	W	D	L	GF	GA	GD	Pts	Pld	W	D	L	GF	GA	GD	Pts	Pld	W	D	L	GF	GA	GD	Pts
22	7	7	8	36	41	–5	21	11	5	3	3	21	17	+4	13	11	2	4	5	15	24	–9	8

==== Positions by round ====
Round	1	2	3	4	5	6	7	8	9	10	11	12	13	14	15	16	17	18	19	20	21	22
Ground	H	A	H	A	H	A	H	A	A	H	A	A	H	A	H	A	H	A	H	H	A	H
Result	L	D	L	L	W	W	W	D	L	D	D	L	W	L	D	W	L	L	W	D	D	W
Position	12	10	12	12	10	8	7	7	8	7	10	10	8	9	8	8	8	9	8	8	8	8

Source: see below

==== Results ====
29 April 1984 1	Molde	0–3	Start	Molde
CET (UTC+1)		Report	Håberg 13'; Ervik 35', 51'	Stadium: Molde Stadion; Attendance: 5,108

6 May 1984 2	Moss	2–2	Molde	Moss
CET (UTC+1)	Henæs 19', 41'	Report	Hestad 23'; Ulvestad 86'	Stadium: Melløs Stadion; Attendance: 4,239

13 May 1984 3	Molde	0–1	Vålerengen	Molde
CET (UTC+1)		Report	Gran 31'	Stadium: Molde Stadion; Attendance: 4,000

16 May 1984 4	Rosenborg	3–1	Molde	Trondheim
CET (UTC+1)	Brandhaug 62', 77', 87'	Report	Ulvestad 66'	Stadium: Lerkendal Stadion; Attendance: 18,566

20 May 1984 5	Molde	3–0	Fredrikstad	Molde
CET (UTC+1)	Berg 37'; Eikrem 55'; Nesbø 85'	Report		Stadium: Molde Stadion; Attendance: 3,200

3 June 1984 7	Molde	2–1	Eik	Molde
CET (UTC+1)	Ulvestad 2'; Berg 40'	Report	Holm 84'	Stadium: Molde Stadion; Attendance: 3,222

11 June 1984 8	Kongsvinger	1–1	Molde	Kongsvinger
CET (UTC+1)	Nystuen 60'	Report	Hestad 8' (pen.)	Stadium: Gjemselund Stadion; Attendance: 3,909

17 June 1984 9	Lillestrøm	5–1	Molde	Lillestrøm
CET (UTC+1)	Smedås 35'; Opseth 63'; Krogsæter 67' (pen.); Erlandsen 69'; Vaadal 80'	Report	Henden 77'	Stadium: Åråsen Stadion; Attendance: 4,035

24 June 1984 10	Molde	4–4	Strindheim	Molde
CET (UTC+1)	Henden 25', 84'; Ulvestad 69'; Møller 75'	Report	Sørloth 6', 9'; Myrenget 18', 64'	Stadium: Molde Stadion; Attendance: 2,000

28 June 1984 6	Viking	0–1	Molde	Stavanger
CET (UTC+1)		Report	Dahl 9'	Stadium: Stavanger Stadion; Attendance: 4,013

1 July 1984 11	Bryne	1–1	Molde	Bryne
CET (UTC+1)	Kleppa 31'	Report	Henden 77'	Stadium: Bryne Stadion; Attendance: 3,026

18 July 1984 12	Start	4–2	Molde	Kristiansand
CET (UTC+1)	Klepp 57'; Osvold 60'; Emanuelsen 64'; Seland 89'	Report	Hestad 20' (pen.); Dahl 84'	Stadium: Kristiansand Stadion; Attendance: 2,394

12 August 1984 13	Molde	3–0	Moss	Molde
CET (UTC+1)	Stranden 49'; Berg 57', 66'	Report		Stadium: Molde Stadion; Attendance: 3,417

15 August 1984 14	Vålerengen	3–0	Molde	Oslo
CET (UTC+1)	Bergsvand 44'; Davidsen 55'; Nilsen 83'	Report		Stadium: Bislett Stadion; Attendance: 4,069

19 August 1984 15	Molde	2–2	Rosenborg	Molde
CET (UTC+1)	Ulvestad 30'; Hestad 70'	Report	Dokken 13', 58'	Stadium: Molde Stadion; Attendance: 3,250

26 August 1984 16	Fredrikstad	2–4	Molde	Fredrikstad
CET (UTC+1)	Audsen 68'; Lund 78'	Report	Hareide 3'; Møller 8', 67'; Hestad 90' (pen.)	Stadium: Fredrikstad Stadion; Attendance: 3,725

2 September 1984 17	Molde	1–3	Viking	Molde
CET (UTC+1)	Sorthe 68'	Report	Refvik 6'; Lundal 16'; Hammer 77'	Stadium: Molde Stadion; Attendance: 3,230

9 September 1984 18	Eik	2–1	Molde	Tønsberg
CET (UTC+1)	Antonsen 31' (pen.); Stranden 85' (o.g.)	Report	Hareide 86'	Stadium: Tønsberg Gressbane; Attendance: 2,000

16 September 1984 19	Molde	1–0	Kongsvinger	Molde
CET (UTC+1)	Møller 50'	Report		Stadium: Molde Stadion; Attendance: 2,986

30 September 1984 20	Molde	0–0	Lillestrøm	Molde
CET (UTC+1)		Report		Stadium: Molde Stadion; Attendance: 2,980

7 October 1984 21	Strindheim	1–1	Molde	Trondheim
CET (UTC+1)	Tørset 35'	Report	Hestad (penalty missed); Nesbø 85'	Stadium: Lerkendal Stadion; Attendance: 900

14 October 1984 22	Molde	5–3	Bryne	Molde
CET (UTC+1)	Hareide 14'; Nesbø 32'; Ulvestad 52'; Møller 64'; Hestad 88'	Report	Folkvord 7'; Norheim 69'; Herrem 88'	Stadium: Molde Stadion; Attendance: 2,450

==== League table ====
Pos	Team	Pld	W	D	L	GF	GA	GD	Pts	Qualification or relegation
1	Vålerengen (C)	22	13	6	3	40	14	+26	32	Qualification for the European Cup first round
2	Viking	22	9	7	6	33	23	+10	25	Qualification for the UEFA Cup first round
3	Start	22	10	5	7	33	29	+4	25	
4	Bryne	22	7	10	5	37	36	+1	24	
5	Lillestrøm	22	8	7	7	39	30	+9	23	
6	Rosenborg	22	8	7	7	36	37	−1	23	
7	Kongsvinger	22	9	5	8	29	32	−3	23	
8	Molde	22	7	7	8	36	41	−5	21	
9	Eik	22	8	3	11	30	36	−6	19	
10	Moss (O)	22	4	9	9	26	30	−4	17	Qualification for the relegation play-offs
11	Fredrikstad (R)	22	5	7	10	23	35	−12	17	Cup Winners' Cup first round and relegation to the Second Division
12	Strindheim (R)	22	5	5	12	18	37	−19	15	Relegation to the Second Division

Source: NIFS
Rules for classification: 1) points; 2) goal difference; 3) number of goals scored.
(C) Champions; (O) Play-off winners; (R) Relegated

=== Norwegian Cup ===
30 May 1984 First round	Molde	3 – 1	Spjelkavik	Molde
CEST (UTC+2)	Ulvestad 30', 56', 58'	Report	Unknown	Stadium: Molde Stadion; Attendance: 485

14 June 1984 Second round	Hareid	0 – 4	Molde	Hareid
CEST (UTC+2)		Report	Berg 11'; Hestad 18'; Henden 28'; Ulvestad 48'	Attendance: 1,200

22 June 1984 Third round	Molde	2 – 1	Sunndal	Molde
CEST (UTC+2)	Henden 49'; Hareide 90+2'	Report	Unknown 73'	Stadium: Molde Stadion

22 August 1984 Fourth round	Molde	2 – 7	Rosenborg	Molde
CEST (UTC+2)	Sorthe 41'; Dahl 85'	Report	Hansen 20'; Eggen 23'; Angvik 28', 33', 49', 90'; Jenshus 52'	Stadium: Molde Stadion; Attendance: 5,149; Referee: Steinar Aas

== Squad statistics ==
=== Appearances and goals ===
No.	Pos	Nat	Player	Total		1. divisjon		Norwegian Cup	
No.	Pos	Nat	Player	Apps	Goals	Apps	Goals	Apps	Goals
	MF	(Norway) NOR	Per Arne Aase	9	0	2+5	0	1+1	0
	MF	(Norway) NOR	Jan Berg	24	5	21	4	3	1
		(Norway) NOR	Børre Bjørsvik	8	0	4	0	2+2	0
	GK	(Norway) NOR	Inge Bratteteig	25	0	22	0	3	0
	DF	(Norway) NOR	Alf Gunnar Dahl	25	3	22	2	3	1
	DF	(Norway) NOR	Knut Hallvard Eikrem	18	1	7+9	1	1+1	0
	DF	(Norway) NOR	Tor Gunnar Hagbø	19	0	14+1	0	4	0
	DF	(Norway) NOR	Åge Hareide	20	4	17	3	2+1	1
		(Norway) NOR	Ove Heggem	4	0	2+2	0	0	0
	FW	(Norway) NOR	Steinar Henden	16	6	11+2	4	3	2
	MF	(Norway) NOR	Stein Olav Hestad	23	7	19+1	6	3	1
	MF	(Norway) NOR	Geir Malmedal	12	0	9+2	0	0+1	0
		(Norway) NOR	Stig Monsen	7	0	4+1	0	1+1	0
	GK	(Norway) NOR	Bjørnar Myking	2	0	0	0	1+1	0
	DF	(Norway) NOR	Ulrich Møller	26	5	22	5	4	0
	MF	(Norway) NOR	Knut Nesbø	26	3	22	3	4	0
		(Norway) NOR	Einar Sekkeseter	4	0	1+2	0	1	0
		(Norway) NOR	Terje Sorthe	16	2	6+9	1	1	1
	DF	(Norway) NOR	Bertil Stranden	19	1	16	1	3	0
	FW	(Norway) NOR	Rune Ulvestad	25	10	21	6	4	4

=== Goalscorers ===
Rank	Position	Nat.	Player	1. divisjon	Norwegian Cup	Total
1	FW	(Norway)	Rune Ulvestad	6	4	10
2	MF	(Norway)	Stein Olav Hestad	6	1	7
3	FW	(Norway)	Steinar Henden	4	2	6
4	DF	(Norway)	Ulrich Møller	5	0	5
4	MF	(Norway)	Jan Berg	4	1	5
6	DF	(Norway)	Åge Hareide	3	1	4
7	MF	(Norway)	Knut Nesbø	3	0	3
7	DF	(Norway)	Alf Gunnar Dahl	2	1	3
9		(Norway)	Terje Sorthe	1	1	2
10	DF	(Norway)	Knut Hallvard Eikrem	1	0	1
10	DF	(Norway)	Bertil Stranden	1	0	1
			TOTALS	36	11	47

== See also ==
- Molde FK seasons
