= 1981 Molde FK season =

Molde
1981 season
- Chairman: Gunnar Hagbø
- Head coach: Torkild Brakstad
- Stadium: Molde Stadion
- 2. divisjon, group B: 2nd (promoted)
- Norwegian Cup: Fourth round vs. Bryne
- Top goalscorer: League: Rune Ulvestad (13); All: Rune Ulvestad (15)
- Highest home attendance: 4,022 vs Pors

The 1981 season was Molde's 20th season in the second tier of Norwegian football and their first since their relegation from 1. divisjon in 1980. This season Molde competed in 2. divisjon (second tier) and the Norwegian Cup.

In the league, Molde finished in 2nd position in 2. divisjon group B, 2 points behind winners Sogndal and qualified for promotion play-offs. Molde won promotion to the 1982 1. divisjon after winning the play-offs on goal difference against Brann and Pors.

Molde participated in the 1981 Norwegian Cup. Molde reached the fourth round where they were eliminated by Bryne. Molde lost the fourth round 2–4 on away ground after extra time.

== Squad ==
Source: Note: Flags indicate national team as defined under FIFA eligibility rules; some limited exceptions apply. Players may hold more than one non-FIFA nationality.

No.	Pos.	Nation	Player
—	GK	(Norway) NOR	Runar Bratli
—	GK	(Norway) NOR	Inge Bratteteig
—	GK	(Norway) NOR	Stein Hagen
—	GK	(Norway) NOR	Roger Marhaug
—	DF	(Norway) NOR	Stål Bjørkly
—	DF	(Norway) NOR	Tor Gunnar Hagbø
—	DF	(Norway) NOR	Åge Hareide
—	DF	(Norway) NOR	Ivar Helge Mittet
—	DF	(Norway) NOR	Ulrich Møller
—	DF	(Norway) NOR	Einar Sekkeseter
—	DF	(Norway) NOR	Bertil Stranden
—	MF	(Norway) NOR	Per Arne Aase

No.	Pos.	Nation	Player
—	MF	(Norway) NOR	Stein Olav Hestad
—	MF	(Norway) NOR	Leidulf Lyngstad
—	MF	(Norway) NOR	Knut Nesbø
—	FW	(Norway) NOR	Jan Fuglset
—	FW	(Norway) NOR	Lars Tennfjord
—	FW	(Norway) NOR	Rune Ulvestad
—		(Norway) NOR	Paul Arne Håskjold
—		(Norway) NOR	Lasse Havnes
—		(Norway) NOR	Lars Even Østigård
—		(Norway) NOR	Frank Tore Tangen
—		(Norway) NOR	Terje Sorthe

== Friendlies ==
28 February 1981	Molde	2–1	Kristiansund	Molde
CET (UTC+1)	Goal	Report	Goal	Stadium: Lubbenes kunstgress

7 March 1981	Molde	1–1	Skarbøvik	Molde
CET (UTC+1)	Goal	Report	Goal	Stadium: Lubbenes kunstgress

14 March 1981	Molde	1–1	Hamarkameratene	Molde
CET (UTC+1)	Goal	Report	Goal	Stadium: Lubbenes kunstgress

15 March 1981	Molde	2–1	Steinkjer	Molde
CET (UTC+1)	Goal	Report	Goal	Stadium: Lubbenes kunstgress

21 March 1981	Molde	1–2	Nessegutten	Molde
CET (UTC+1)	Goal	Report	Goal	Stadium: Lubbenes kunstgress

22 March 1981	Molde	9–1	Sørumsand	Molde
CET (UTC+1)	Goal	Report	Goal	Stadium: Lubbenes kunstgress

28 March 1981	Rosenborg	0–1	Molde	Lade, Trondheim
CET (UTC+1)		Report	Goal

29 March 1981	Molde	3–1	Ørsta	Molde
CET (UTC+1)	Goal	Report	Goal	Stadium: Lubbenes kunstgress

4 April 1981	Hødd	3–1	Molde	Vigra
CET (UTC+1)	Goal	Report	Goal

11 April 1981	Bryn	1–5	Molde	Farstad
CET (UTC+1)	Goal	Report	Goal

12 April 1981	Os	1–2	Molde	Bergen
CET (UTC+1)	Goal	Report	Goal

15 April 1981	Skarbøvik	0–0	Molde	Hessa, Ålesund Municipality
CET (UTC+1)		Report

20 April 1981	Hamarkameratene	1–0	Molde	Hamar
CET (UTC+1)	Goal	Report

20 July 1981	Røros	1–2	Molde	Røros
CET (UTC+1)	Unknown 85'	Report	Ulvestad ?', ?'	Attendance: 700
Note: Tippekamp

27 July 1981	Molde	4–1	Træff	Molde
CET (UTC+1)	Ulvestad 4'; Fuglset ?'; Hareide ?'; Hestad ?'	Report	Unknown ?'

== Competitions ==
=== 2. divisjon ===
==== Results summary ====
Overall								Home								Away							
Pld	W	D	L	GF	GA	GD	Pts	Pld	W	D	L	GF	GA	GD	Pts	Pld	W	D	L	GF	GA	GD	Pts
22	10	9	3	41	20	+21	29	11	6	5	0	24	8	+16	17	11	4	4	3	17	12	+5	12

==== Positions by round ====
Round	1	2	3	4	5	6	7	8	9	10	11	12	13	14	15	16	17	18	19	20	21	22
Ground	A	H	H	A	H	A	H	A	H	H	A	A	H	A	H	A	H	A	H	A	A	H
Result	L	D	D	L	D	D	W	W	W	D	W	D	D	D	W	W	W	W	W	D	W	W
Position					11	11	10	4	4	4	4	4	4	4	4	4	3	3	3	3	2	2

Source: see below

==== League table ====
Pos	Team	Pld	W	D	L	GF	GA	GD	Pts	Promotion, qualification or relegation
1	Sogndal (C, P)	22	12	7	3	44	14	+30	31	Promotion to First Division
2	Molde (O, P)	22	10	9	3	41	20	+21	29	Qualification for the promotion play-offs
3	Mo	22	8	11	3	33	20	+13	27	
4	Sunndal	22	6	11	5	25	26	−1	23	
5	Varegg	22	7	9	6	31	35	−4	23	

Source: rsssf.no
Rules for classification: 1) points; 2) goal difference; 3) number of goals scored.
(C) Champions; (O) Play-off winners; (P) Promoted

=== Promotion play-offs ===
Pos	Team	Pld	W	D	L	GF	GA	GD	Pts	Promotion or relegation
1	Molde (O, P)	2	1	0	1	3	2	+1	2	Promotion to First Division
2	Brann (R)	2	1	0	1	2	2	0	2	Relegation to Second Division
3	Pors	2	1	0	1	3	4	−1	2	Remained in Second Division

Source: rsssf.no
Rules for classification: 1) points; 2) goal difference; 3) number of goals scored.
(O) Play-off winners; (P) Promoted; (R) Relegated

Results

1981 Play-offs	Molde	3–1	Pors	Molde
CEST (UTC+2)	Hestad 33'; Stranden 63'; Lyngstad 83'	Report	Unknown 8'	Stadium: Molde Stadion; Attendance: 4,022

24 October 1981 Play-offs	Brann	1–0	Molde	Bergen
CEST (UTC+2)	Giske ?'	Report		Stadium: Brann Stadion; Attendance: 15,000

Molde won the qualification round and was promoted to the 1. divisjon.

=== Norwegian Cup ===
28 May 1981 First round	Velledalen/Ringen	0–2	Molde	Velledalen, Sykkylven Municipality
CEST (UTC+2)		Report	Unknown; Unknown

24 June 1981 Second round	Molde	0–0	Aalesund	Molde
CEST (UTC+2)		Report		Stadium: Molde Stadion

8 July 1981 Second round Replay	Aalesund	2–3	Molde	Ålesund
CEST (UTC+2)	Unknown; Unknown	Report	Ulvestad 42' (67); Hareide 52'	Stadium: Kråmyra Stadion

12 July 1981 Third round	Molde	4–2	Strindheim	Molde
CEST (UTC+2)	Fuglset 41', ?'; Hestad 49'; Lyngstad ?'	Report	Unknown; Unknown	Stadium: Molde Stadion; Attendance: 1,621

5 August 1981 Fourth round	Bryne	4–2 (a.e.t.)	Molde	Bryne
CEST (UTC+2)	Hellvik 18'; Fjeldstad 52'; Mæland 95'; Mellomstrand 97'	Report	Engstrøm 40' (o.g.); Aase 54'	Stadium: Bryne Stadion; Attendance: 1,825; Referee: Per Arne Larsgård

== Squad statistics ==
=== Appearances and goals ===
Lacking information:

- Appearance statistics from league games in rounds 1 (Mo away), 13 (Mo home) and 16 (Bergsøy away) are missing.
- Three goalscorers from league games in round 11 (Kristiansund away) are missing.
- Two goalscorers from Norwegian Cup round 1 (Velledalen/Ringen away) are missing.

No.	Pos	Nat	Player	Total		2. divisjon		Norwegian Cup		Promotion play-offs	
No.	Pos	Nat	Player	Apps	Goals	Apps	Goals	Apps	Goals	Apps	Goals
	GK	(Norway) NOR	Inge Bratteteig	27	0	20	0	5	0	2	0
	GK	(Norway) NOR	Stein Hagen	1	0	1	0	0	0	0	0
	DF	(Norway) NOR	Stål Bjørkly	2	0	2	0	0	0	0	0
	DF	(Norway) NOR	Tor Gunnar Hagbø	26	0	19	0	5	0	2	0
	DF	(Norway) NOR	Åge Hareide	20	7	15	6	5	1	0	0
	DF	(Norway) NOR	Ivar Helge Mittet	10	0	4+4	0	1+1	0	0	0
	DF	(Norway) NOR	Ulrich Møller	19	0	12+2	0	3	0	2	0
	DF	(Norway) NOR	Einar Sekkeseter	23	1	16	1	5	0	2	0
	DF	(Norway) NOR	Bertil Stranden	26	3	19	2	5	0	2	1
	MF	(Norway) NOR	Per Arne Aase	22	2	15+1	1	4	1	2	0
	MF	(Norway) NOR	Stein Olav Hestad	26	7	19	5	4+1	1	2	1
	MF	(Norway) NOR	Leidulf Lyngstad	25	3	18	1	5	1	2	1
	MF	(Norway) NOR	Knut Nesbø	25	1	15+3	1	4+1	0	0+2	0
	FW	(Norway) NOR	Jan Fuglset	21	4	12+3	2	4	2	2	0
	FW	(Norway) NOR	Lars Tennfjord	15	2	6+8	2	0+1	0	0	0
	FW	(Norway) NOR	Rune Ulvestad	25	15	17+1	13	5	2	2	0
		(Norway) NOR	Paul Arne Håskjold	8	0	2+4	0	0+2	0	0	0
		(Norway) NOR	Lasse Havnes	1	0	0+1	0	0	0	0	0
		(Norway) NOR	Hoseth	1	0	1	0	0	0	0	0
		(Norway) NOR	Terje Sorthe	10	2	4+3	2	0+1	0	2	0
		(Norway) NOR	Frank Tore Tangen	1	0	0+1	0	0	0	0	0

=== Goalscorers ===
Rank	Position	Nat.	Player	1. divisjon	Norwegian Cup	Promotion play-offs	Total
1	FW	(Norway)	Rune Ulvestad	13	2	0	15
2	MF	(Norway)	Åge Hareide	6	1	0	7
2	MF	(Norway)	Stein Olav Hestad	5	1	1	7
4	FW	(Norway)	Jan Fuglset	2	2	0	4
5	MF	(Norway)	Leidulf Lyngstad	1	1	1	3
5	DF	(Norway)	Bertil Stranden	2	0	1	3
7		(Norway)	Terje Sorthe	2	0	0	2
7	FW	(Norway)	Lars Tennfjord	2	0	0	2
7	MF	(Norway)	Per Arne Aase	1	1	0	2
10	MF	(Norway)	Knut Nesbø	1	0	0	1
10	DF	(Norway)	Einar Sekkeseter	1	0	0	1
			Unknown	3	2	0	5
			Own goals	2	1	0	3
			TOTALS	41	11	3	55

== See also ==
- Molde FK seasons
