= 1985 Norwegian First Division =

41st season of top-tier football league in Norway

1. divisjon
- Season: 1985
- Dates: 27 April – 13 October
- Champions: Rosenborg; 4th title
- Relegated: Moss; Brann; Eik
- European Cup: Rosenborg
- UEFA Cup: Vålerengen
- Cup Winners' Cup: Lillestrøm
- Matches played: 132
- Goals scored: 396 (3 per match)
- Top goalscorer: Jørn Andersen (23 goals)
- Biggest home win: Lillestrøm 5–2 Eik (16 May 1985)
- Biggest away win: Start 0–7 Vålerengen (19 May 1985)
- Highest scoring: Moss 6–2 Molde (30 June 1985)
- Highest attendance: 28,569; Rosenborg 1–0 Lillestrøm (12 October 1985)
- Lowest attendance: 835; Eik 1–0 Bryne (16 October 1985)
- Average attendance: 4,403 ▲2.2%
- All statistics correct as of end of the 1985 season.

The 1985 1. divisjon was the 41st completed season of top division football in Norway. The season began on 27 April 1985 and ended on 13 October 1985.

22 games were played with 2 points given for wins and 1 for draws. Number eleven and twelve were relegated. The winners of the two groups of the 2. divisjon were promoted, as well as the winner of a series of play-off matches between the two second-placed teams in the two groups of the 2. divisjon and number ten in the 1. divisjon.

Rosenborg BK won the league after defeating league leader Lillestrøm S.K. 1–0 in the 22nd and final round. The game was attended by 28,569 spectators, which is, as of 2019, still a league record attendance for a single game in the Norwegian top flight.

== Teams and locations ==
Note: Table lists in alphabetical order.

Team	Ap.	Location	Stadium
Brann	30	Bergen	Brann Stadion
Bryne	10	Bryne	Bryne Stadion
Eik	8	Tønsberg	Tønsberg Gressbane
Kongsvinger	3	Kongsvinger	Gjemselund Stadion
Lillestrøm	22	Lillestrøm	Åråsen Stadion
Mjøndalen	15	Mjøndalen	Nedre Eiker Stadion
Molde	11	Molde	Molde Stadion
Moss	12	Moss	Melløs Stadion
Rosenborg	22	Trondheim	Lerkendal Stadion
Start	18	Kristiansand	Kristiansand Stadion
Vålerengen	30	Oslo	Bislett Stadion
Viking	38	Stavanger	Stavanger Stadion

== League table ==
Pos	Team	Pld	W	D	L	GF	GA	GD	Pts	Qualification or relegation
1	Rosenborg (C)	22	15	3	4	43	22	+21	33	Qualification for the European Cup first round
2	Lillestrøm	22	12	8	2	39	11	+28	32	Qualification for the Cup Winners' Cup first round
3	Vålerengen	22	9	6	7	44	31	+13	24	Qualification for the UEFA Cup first round
4	Kongsvinger	22	9	6	7	33	34	−1	24	
5	Mjøndalen	22	9	4	9	40	31	+9	22	
6	Start	22	9	3	10	40	44	−4	21	
7	Viking	22	8	5	9	28	36	−8	21	
8	Molde	22	7	7	8	25	33	−8	21	
9	Bryne	22	6	8	8	34	29	+5	20	
10	Moss (R)	22	7	5	10	29	34	−5	19	Qualification for the relegation play-offs
11	Brann (R)	22	8	3	11	26	34	−8	19	Relegation to Second Division
12	Eik (R)	22	2	4	16	15	57	−42	8	Relegation to Second Division

Source: nifs.no
Rules for classification: 1) points; 2) goal difference; 3) number of goals scored.
(C) Champions; (R) Relegated

== Results ==
Home \ Away	BRA	BRY	EIK	KON	LIL	MIF	MOL	MOS	ROS	IKS	VIK	VÅL
Brann	—	2–1	3–0	0–1	0–1	1–3	0–0	1–0	0–1	1–4	4–1	3–0
Bryne	0–1	—	6–0	1–1	1–1	1–1	4–0	2–1	1–2	0–0	2–0	1–1
Eik	1–2	1–0	—	0–1	0–1	1–2	1–1	0–0	1–4	0–3	4–0	1–1
Kongsvinger	0–0	2–3	3–1	—	0–0	0–5	2–1	2–3	2–0	6–0	3–1	2–1
Lillestrøm	1–0	1–1	8–0	1–1	—	6–1	0–0	0–2	3–0	2–0	2–2	1–1
Mjøndalen	3–3	1–2	2–1	5–1	0–1	—	0–0	0–1	1–1	4–1	3–0	0–1
Molde	2–1	2–1	0–0	1–0	1–3	3–2	—	1–1	0–2	1–1	3–0	2–0
Moss	1–2	1–1	2–0	2–2	0–2	0–2	6–2	—	2–3	1–0	1–1	3–2
Rosenborg	4–0	3–1	5–1	1–1	1–0	3–1	4–1	1–0	—	1–0	1–2	1–2
Start	3–2	3–2	6–1	5–1	0–2	0–3	3–1	3–0	1–2	—	3–2	0–7
Viking	1–0	1–1	4–0	3–0	0–3	2–0	2–1	2–1	0–1	1–1	—	1–0
Vålerengen	6–0	4–2	3–1	0–2	0–0	2–1	0–2	5–1	2–2	4–3	2–2	—

Source: nifs.no (in Norwegian)
Legend: Blue = home team win; Yellow = draw; Red = away team win.

== Relegation play-offs ==
The qualification matches were contested between Moss (10th in the 1. divisjon), Sogndal (2nd in the 2. divisjon - Group A), and Tromsø (2nd in the 2. divisjon - Group B). Tromsø won and was promoted to the 1. divisjon.

Results

- Tromsø - Sogndal 1–0
- Sogndal - Moss 0–2
- Moss - Tromsø 0–1

Table

Pos	Team	Pld	W	D	L	GF	GA	GD	Pts	Promotion or relegation
1	Tromsø (O, P)	2	2	0	0	2	0	+2	4	Promotion to First Division
2	Moss (R)	2	1	0	1	2	1	+1	2	Relegation to Second Division
3	Sogndal	2	0	0	2	0	3	−3	0	Remained in Second Division

Source: rsssf.no
(O) Play-off winners; (P) Promoted; (R) Relegated

== Season statistics ==
=== Top scorers ===
Rank	Player	Club	Goals
1	(Norway) Jørn Andersen	Vålerengen	23
2	(Norway) Odd Johnsen	Mjøndalen	18
3	(Norway) Cato Holtet	Kongsvinger	14
4	(Norway) Trygve Johannessen	Brann	11
4	(Norway) Arve Seland	Start	11
4	(Norway) Joar Vaadal	Lillestrøm	11
7	(Norway) Sverre Brandhaug	Rosenborg	10
7	(Norway) Paul Folkvord	Bryne	10
7	(Norway) Gøran Sørloth	Rosenborg	10
10	(Norway) Tom Sundby	Lillestrøm	9
11	(Norway) Kjetil Sagen	Kongsvinger	8
12	(Norway) Nils Ove Hellvik	Viking	7
12	(Norway) Geir Henæs	Moss	7
12	(Norway) Sten Glenn Håberg	Start	7
12	(Norway) Vidar Sanderud	Kongsvinger	7

=== Attendances ===
Pos	Team	Total	High	Low	Average	Change
1	Rosenborg	113,554	28,569	5,925	10,323	+40.0%
2	Brann	96,806	13,305	5,582	8,801	n/a^{2}
3	Viking	67,719	13,541	3,326	6,156	+11.7%
4	Lillestrøm	53,091	8,364	2,216	4,826	+19.6%
5	Vålerengen	49,070	8,293	2,207	4,461	−18.7%
6	Bryne	39,758	8,670	2,271	3,614	+4.8%
7	Moss	33,251	5,252	1,670	3,023	−16.4%
8	Kongsvinger	31,361	4,063	1,879	2,851	−0.2%
9	Start	30,331	3,920	1,651	2,757	−27.4%
10	Molde	29,850	3,550	1,580	2,714	−18.9%
11	Mjøndalen	26,035	3,352	1,264	2,367	n/a^{2}
12	Eik	22,112	3,418	835	2,010	−46.0%
	League total	592,938	28,569	835	4,492	+4.2%

Source: nifs.no
Notes:
2: Team played last season in 2. divisjon.
