= Tom Sundby =

Norwegian footballer (born 1960)

Personal information
- Date of birth: 15 December 1960 (age 65)
- Place of birth: Larvik, Norway
- Height: 1.85 m (6 ft 1 in)
- Positions: Striker; midfielder

Youth career
- ?–1976: Stag
- 1977: Larvik Turn

Senior career*
Years	Team	Apps	(Gls)
1978–1980	Larvik Turn	?	(?)
1981–1982	Lyn	9	(3)
1983–1986	Lillestrøm	83	(22)
1986–1988	Iraklis	38	(7)
1990–1992	Lyn	?	(?)

International career
1983–1988	Norway	39	(6)
Medal record
Lillestrøm
Runner-up	1. division	1985
Winner	1. division	1986
Winner	Norwegian Football Cup	1985
Runner-up	Norwegian Football Cup	1986
Iraklis
Runner-up	Greek Football Cup	1987
- * Club domestic league appearances and goals

Tom Sundby (born 15 December 1960) is a former Norwegian footballer. A midfielder who scored 6 goals in 39 caps for the national team, he participated in the 1984 Summer Olympics. His father Reidar Sundby was a football player. The elder brother Reidar Sundby jr also and once went to Twente with his friend Hallvar Thoresen.

== Career ==
=== Youth and Lyn ===
Raised in Stavern Sundby followed in the footsteps of his father, Reidar Sundby, began playing football, first at the youth side of the local club Stag, then in Larvik Turn. On 24 September 1977, 16-year-old Sundby played for the Youth Cup qualifying final, which ended 2–0 defeat, then very next day 25 September he made his debut in Larvik Turn's A-team jersey for which he scored twice and the team won the victory over Strømsgodset at the last matchday of the season. As LT relegated, he played together with his elder brother Reidar Sundby jr. for two years in 3. division. At the last matchday of the season 1980, he scored the opening goal, showed his talent and became the best player of the match though Larvik Turn defeated and slipped down to the third place. It was said that he could go to Netherlands to become a professional like his clubmate Hallvar Thoresen. In 1981, Sundby chose to go to 1. division club Lyn, where Reidar jr. once signed a contract in 1980 but never could appeared to the match due to the injury. He made his first appearance to the 1. division on 10 August 1981, for the match between Lyn and Moss which was 5–0 ended, he scored his first goal for Lyn at 65 minutes of the match. He played 9 matches and scored 3 goals in 1981, 24 complete 2. division as Lyn relegated and The Cup matches and 2 goals in 1982.

=== Lillestrøm and Iraklis ===
Then he was brought to Lillestrøm as a replacement for Tom Lund, whom they lost to retirement. He signed a 1-year-contract on 14 December 1982. He made his first appearance for Lillestrøm at the away match against Kongsvinger on 24 April 1983, then scored his first league goal at the home match against Eik-Tønsberg which was 3–0 goal at 25 minutes of the match, on 1 May 1983.

Having developed fully at the sparkling club matches during the spring season, on 15 June 1983 Sundby made his debut for Norway national A team at the Olympic qualifying match against Finland as the substitute for Øivind Tomteberget. It's 29 years since his father Reidar Sundby played his first and only match with the flag on his chest. "But it is still dad who is ahead in the international competition. He got a whole match in 1954, while I only let go for 13 minutes. But I have at least got a leg up in Røste Fossen's list of national team players - so it is only to be hoped that it does not stop with the meagre quarter", he said. Norway was invited to participate in the 1984 Summer Olympics in June as East Germany withdrew. On 11 July 1984, Sundby was selected for the Norwegian Olympic football squad, together with his clubmates Joar Vaadal and André Krogsæter. Having been pressed for time, 24 July arrived in USA, 29 July played against Chile 0–0 draw, 31 July against France 1–2 defeat, 2 August against Qatar 2–0 win. His shirt number was 10.

Sundby took part in the training match between Norway and Italy in raining foggy Lecche on 25 September 1985. Next to number 11 Hallvar Thoresen, he number 8 played in and dominated the left midfield against Bruno Conti and Salvatore Bagni. Norway beat The World Champion with 2–1, and jubilated in the dressing room.

Sundby scored against Denmark on 16 October 1985 in Ullevaal, 1–0 43 minutes of the match. Hallvar Thoresen took a free kick at the right side, Sundby hit it with a header from the near side and the ball arced perfectly into the left side of the goal. Unfortunately it was a game of two halves, missing Svein Fjælberg due to the injury was too big. Against France on 14 October 1987 in Parc des Princes, 1-1 80 minutes of the match. Kjetil Osvold took a free kick approx. 45 degrees diagonally, from a distance of 12,5m in front of the goal Sundby hit it with a header to the ground, and the ball bounced off and into the under left of the goal.

With Lillestrøm, 1985: Sundby finished the second place in the 1. division as LSK defeated by competing Rosenborg with 0–1 and slipped down from the top position after they had led for 12 rounds, at the last matchday on 12 October 1985. Then on 20 October 1985, he won the title 1985 Norwegian Football Cup beating Vålerenga with 4–1 in the glorious Ullevaal, was given The King's Cup by Olav V of Norway. 1986: he won the league gold, which was brought by his only goal of the penultimate game of the season on 12 October 1986 against Strømmen IF with 1–0. Then on 26 October 1986, he lost at the Finale of the 1986 Norwegian Football Cup to Tromsø IL with 4–1.

Sundby was named the Player of the Year 1985 from Aftenposten and 1986 from VG.

On 13 September 1986 He signed a new 2-year-contract with Lillestrøm. On 10 December 1986 he signed a contract with a Alpha Ethniki club Iraklis to become a professional, which had been a dream of his elder brother Reidar jr. and Tom. Since eight years ago when Reidar jr arranged training at Go Ahead for Tom, many foreign clubs - FC Brugge, Gent, Ajax, FC Metz, Mannheim, Darmstadt, Tennis Borussia and Køln - had been mentioned.

On 21 December 1986 Sundby made his first official appearance for Iraklis, heading a long goal-scoring pass to Sakis Anastasiadis at the match against the city rival PAOK with 48000 spectators and pleased Reidar jr who sat in the honour lounge. He played there for two years. Iraklis loved him.

On 21 June 1987, the finale of the 45th Greek Cup was held between Iraklis and OFI, The Olympic Stadium of Athens "Spyros Louis" in front of 23578 fans. As 1–1 at the end of the normal duration of the match, the title was decided on the penalty-shootout. Sundby, being the first taker, missed out. Following 2 of 3 teammates were denied. Iraklis became the runner-up. On 11 September 1988 at the premiere match of the season, he scored 2 of the 3 Iraklis goals, then flew back to Norway.

=== Injured and Comeback at Lyn ===
On 14 September 1988, in the first minute of the match against Scotland, which was Norway's first qualifying match of the 1990 World Cup, Sundby got seriously injured by a tackle from Steve Nicol who was being a right-back surprisingly there in the centre midfield. At that very moment Sundby was moving to shield the ball elegantly. He left the pitch with a bandage around his right knee, fans kept calling his name.

He was very close to a contract with Fiorentina or Nice but had to be sidelined for two years because of that injury, effectively ruining his professional career.

Sundby made a comeback at 2 division Lyn in 1990. He, though playing with only one leg, and Lyn was promoted to 1. division, where he finished 4th in 1991 (Sundby 16 league matches 3 goals), 5th in 1992 (20 league matches 3 goals). He "gave up" as a footballer at the age of 32 in 1993 with 14 league matches 5 goals being one of the best players in Norway then. His retirement from top football was announced in February. Farewell match for Lyn was held at Ullevaal on 25 July 1993, with Spurs. "Of course it was fun to play at Ullevaal again" said Sundby there. "If there's a crisis in Lyn and need for me, I'll think about it (a comeback) once again. But I do not believe that we are going into such situation". Lyn was relegated that year.

He worked for Asics Norway A/S as a general manager.

He was a leader of Football Group in Snarøya Sportsklubb.

Sundby works as marketing director of Norges Fotballforbund since 1 October 2007.

Kjetil Osvold, a former teammate in Lillestrøm and national team both, answered when he was asked who is the best footballer he has ever played with: "Tom Sundby. He had all, a complete football player - simply."

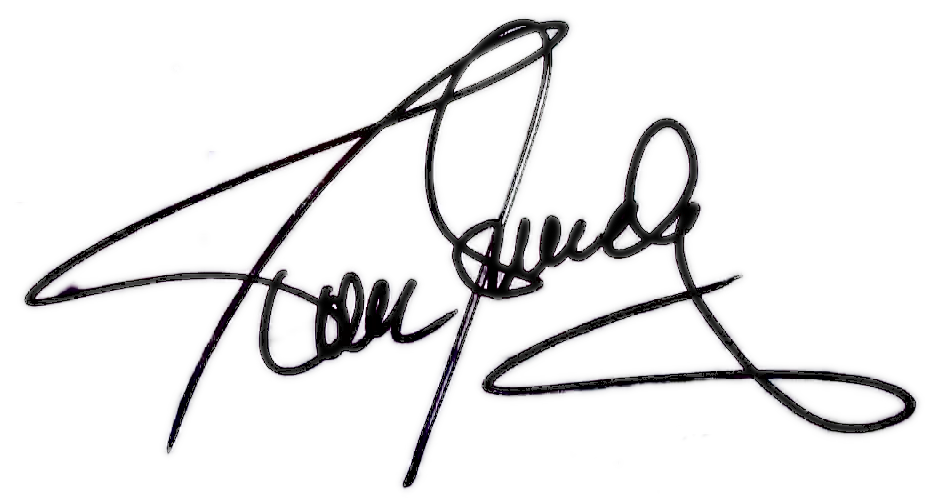
Sundby Autograf
