= Nesbø =

Nesbø is a Norwegian surname. Notable people with the surname include:

- Jo Nesbø (born 1960), Norwegian writer, musician, economist, soccer player, and reporter
- Knut Nesbø (1961–2013), Norwegian sports reporter, brother of Jo
