= Di Derre =

Norwegian pop rock band

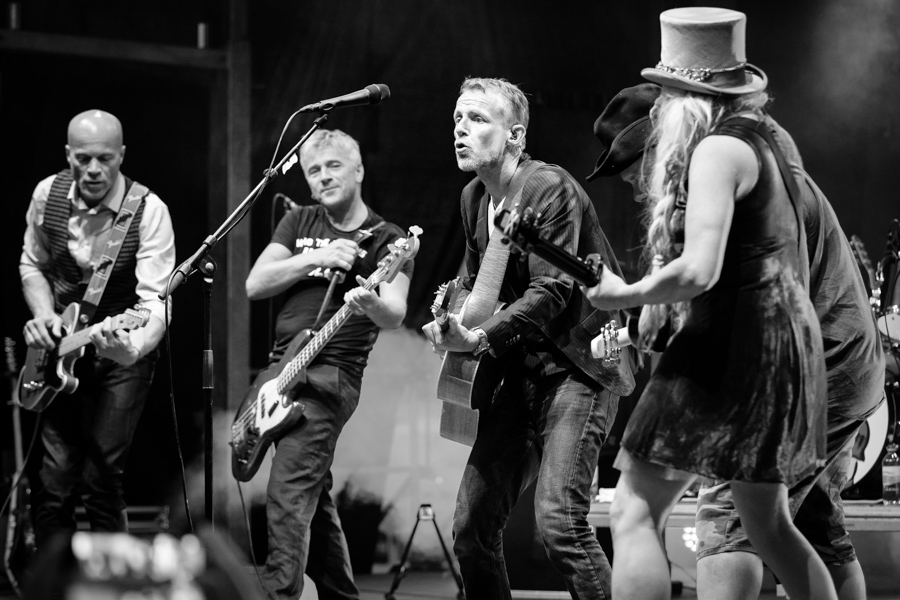
- Di Derre - Kongsberg Jazzfestival 2018

Background information
- Origin: Oslo, Norway
- Genres: Pop rock
- Years active: 1992–present
- Labels: Universal
- Members: Jo Nesbø; Magnus Larsen jr. Espen Stenhammer; Halvor Holter; Unni Wilhelmsen
- Past members: Knut Nesbø; Sverre Beyer

Di Derre is a Norwegian Pop rock band, founded in 1992. They were awarded the Gammleng-prisen in 1996.

== Band members ==
- Jo Nesbø – vocals, guitar
- Espen Stenhammer – drums
- Magnus Larsen jr. – bass guitar, vocals
- Halvor Holter – keyboards
- Unni Wilhelmsen – vocals, guitar (joined September 2013)

Former members

- Knut Nesbø – vocals, guitar (died in 2013)
- Sverre Beyer – drummer (died 2002)

== Discography ==
Year	Album	Peak positions
Year	Album	NOR
1994	Jenter & sånn	1
1995	Den forrige - den derre	29
1995	Den derre	12
1996	Gym	2
1998	Slå meg på popmusikk	12
2006	Di beste med Di Derre (compilation)	4
2013	Historien om et band (compilation)	7
2018	Høyenhall	19
