= Tore Kallstad =

Norwegian footballer (born 1965)

Personal information
- Date of birth: 1 August 1965 (age 61)

Youth career
- Strømmen

Senior career*
Years	Team	Apps	(Gls)
–1991	Strømmen		
1992–1993	Lillestrøm	14	(1)
1993–	Strømmen		

International career
1983	Norway U19	5	(0)
1985–1986	Norway U21	9	(2)

Managerial career
- 1998–1999: Strømmen
- 2000: Strømmen (assistant)
- * Club domestic league appearances and goals

Tore Kallstad (born 1 August 1965) is a Norwegian former professional footballer.

== Career ==
Kallstad started his youth career in Strømmen IF. He was capped five times for Norway U19 and nine times for Norway U21.

Kallstad made his senior debut for Strømmen IF in 1982. He helped win promotions from the 1985 2. divisjon and the 1987 2. divisjon, spending two years in the top flight in 1986 and 1988. Those were Strømmen's only years in the top flight, and with 43 games and 13 goals, Kallstad was both Strømmen's most capped and most scoring player in the highest league. Kallstad eventually tried his luck in Strømmen's bigger neighboring club, Lillestrøm SK. He played 13 matches in the 1992 Eliteserien, but only once in 1993, and decided to rejoin Strømmen in the spring of 1993.

In 1998, Kallstad took over Strømmen as co-coach (with Hans Finstad). Joar Hoff was sacked as Strømmen was facing relegation from the 1998 2. divisjon to the fourth tier. While the new coaches could not avoid relegation, Kallstad and new co-coach Hans Tvedte steered the team to a clear promotion from the 1999 3. divisjon. Kallstad chose to become Tvedte's assistant in 2000.

== Personal life ==
He is an uncle of Andreas Thorud.
