= Reidar Sundby =

Norwegian footballer (1926–2014)

Reidar Sundby (17 October 1926 – 27 October 2014) was a Norwegian footballer who played as a forward.

He started his career in Stag, and joined Larvik Turn in 1952. With his team he won the 1952–53 Norwegian Main League, the 1954–55 Norwegian Main League and the 1955–56 Norwegian Main League—and became top goalscorer in the 1958–59 Norwegian Main League. He scored 71 goals in 110 first-tier games for Larvik Turn.

He was capped once for Norway, in 1954, and scored in the game against Sweden. He later coached Stag.

He died in October 2014. He was the father of Tom Sundby.
