= 1987 Norwegian First Division =

43rd season of top-tier football league in Norway

1. divisjon
- Season: 1987
- Dates: 2 May – 10 October
- Champions: Moss; 1st title
- Relegated: HamKam; Mjøndalen; Start
- European Cup: Moss
- UEFA Cup: Molde
- Cup Winners' Cup: Bryne
- Matches played: 132
- Goals scored: 343 (2.6 per match)
- Top goalscorer: Jan Kristian Fjærestad (18 goals)
- Biggest home win: Moss 5–0 Molde (10 July 1987); Start 6–1 HamKam (3 October 1987); Brann 5–0 Tromsø (10 October 1987)
- Biggest away win: Rosenborg 1–4 Moss (20 June 1987); Mjøndalen 1–4 Bryne (12 September 1987)
- Highest scoring: Kongsvinger 3–4 Start(20 June 1987); Start 6–1 HamKam (3 October 1987)
- Highest attendance: 15,320; Brann 1–0 Vålerengen (16 May 1987)
- Lowest attendance: 1,070; Start 0–2 Molde (15 July 1987)
- Average attendance: 3,553 ▲10.0%

The 1987 1. divisjon was the 43rd completed season of top division football in Norway. The season began on 2 May 1987 and ended on 10 October 1987.

22 rounds were played. Number eleven and twelve were relegated. The winners of the two groups of the 2. divisjon were promoted, as well as the winner of a series of play-off matches between the two second placed teams in the two groups of the 2. divisjon and number ten in the 1. divisjon.

For the first time in the Norwegian top flight, three rather than two points were given for wins. There was also another, more controversial new rule for points: if a match was drawn, two points would be given to the winner of a penalty shootout, and one point to the loser of the shootout. This rule, suggested by Tom A. Schanke and appointed by the Norwegian Football Association in February 1987, was highly controversial and liquidated after the 1987 season. Note that if draws would end as draws with one point to each, as usual, Tromsø IL would have been placed 10th with a possibility of being relegated.

== Overview ==
Moss FK, coached by Nils Arne Eggen, won the league for the first and, as of the 2024 season, last time. The victory was not settled until the final round of the league, with Moss beating runners-up Molde FK (who would have grabbed the gold if they defeated Moss) 2-0 at away grounds.

== Teams and locations ==
Note: Table lists in alphabetical order.

Team	Ap.	Location	Stadium
Brann	31	Bergen	Brann Stadion
Bryne	12	Bryne	Bryne Stadion
HamKam	14	Hamar	Briskeby
Kongsvinger	5	Kongsvinger	Gjemselund Stadion
Lillestrøm	24	Lillestrøm	Åråsen Stadion
Mjøndalen	17	Mjøndalen	Nedre Eiker Stadion
Molde	13	Molde	Molde Stadion
Moss	13	Moss	Melløs Stadion
Rosenborg	24	Trondheim	Lerkendal Stadion
Start	20	Kristiansand	Kristiansand Stadion
Tromsø	2	Tromsø	Alfheim Stadion
Vålerengen	32	Oslo	Bislett Stadion

== League table ==
Pos	Team	Pld	W	PKW	PKL	L	GF	GA	GD	Pts	Qualification or relegation
1	Moss (C)	22	13	2	1	6	44	30	+14	44	Qualification for the European Cup first round
2	Molde	22	11	3	2	6	27	20	+7	41	Qualification for the UEFA Cup first round
3	Kongsvinger	22	9	4	4	5	32	22	+10	39	
4	Rosenborg	22	8	4	7	3	33	25	+8	39	
5	Bryne	22	11	0	1	10	32	27	+5	34	Qualification for the Cup Winners' Cup preliminary round
6	Tromsø	22	5	7	2	8	19	31	−12	31	
7	Vålerengen	22	8	1	4	9	26	27	−1	30	
8	Brann	22	7	3	3	9	25	28	−3	30	
9	Lillestrøm	22	7	3	2	10	22	21	+1	29	
10	HamKam (R)	22	7	3	2	10	27	34	−7	29	Qualification for the relegation play-offs
11	Mjøndalen (R)	22	6	2	3	11	26	34	−8	25	Relegation to the Second Division
12	Start (R)	22	6	2	3	11	30	44	−14	25	Relegation to the Second Division

Source: nifs.no
(C) Champion; (R) Relegated

== Results ==
Results in brackets indicate the results from penalty shoot-outs whenever games were drawn.

Home \ Away	BRA	BRY	HAM	KON	LIL	MIF	MOL	MOS	ROS	IKS	TRO	VÅL
Brann	—	1–3	0–0^{(5–4)}	2–1	0–1	1–1^{(11–12)}	0–2	3–1	1–1^{(5–6)}	1–0	5–0	1–0
Bryne	1–2	—	4–2	4–1	1–0	3–0	2–1	1–2	0–2	0–1	0–1	2–1
HamKam	4–1	1–0	—	2–2^{(5–3)}	2–1	1–1^{(4–3)}	0–2	2–0	3–0	3–0	1–1^{(4–5)}	3–5
Kongsvinger	2–0	4–0	0–1	—	1–0	1–0	1–0	0–1	1–1^{(2–4)}	3–4	0–0^{(4–5)}	2–2^{(4–2)}
Lillestrøm	0–0^{(3–4)}	0–1	1–0	0–2	—	1–0	2–1	1–2	1–1^{(5–4)}	5–1	3–0	0–0^{(6–5)}
Mjøndalen	2–0	1–4	2–0	1–1^{(4–5)}	1–3	—	0–0^{(4–5)}	3–0	1–3	2–1	3–0	3–0
Molde	2–1	1–0	2–1	1–1^{(1–3)}	0–0	1–0	—	0–2	1–1^{(4–2)}	1–2	2–1	4–0
Moss	3–2	0–2	4–1	1–3	2–1	4–2	5–0	—	1–1^{(10–9)}	5–1	4–2	1–0
Rosenborg	0–0^{(4–5)}	2–2^{(4–3)}	1–1^{(5–6)}	0–0^{(4–5)}	3–2	3–0	0–2	1–4	—	4–1	2–0	1–1^{(5–4)}
Start	3–1	0–1	6–1	0–0^{(4–2)}	0–0^{(3–1)}	3–0	1–0	2–2^{(2–4)}	1–3	—	2–2^{(7–8)}	1–3
Tromsø	1–1^{(5–4)}	3–1	2–0	1–3	1–0	2–1	0–0^{(5–6)}	0–0^{(7–6)}	1–1^{(4–1)}	1–1^{(3–1)}	—	0–1
Vålerengen	0–2	1–0	1–0	1–3	2–0	2–2^{(3–5)}	1–2	2–0	1–2	4–0	0–0^{(3–2)}	—

Source: nifs.no (in Norwegian)
Legend: Blue = home team win; Yellow = draw; Red = away team win.

== Relegation play-offs ==
The qualification matches were contested between Hamarkameratene (10th in the 1. divisjon), Djerv 1919 (2nd in the 2. divisjon - Group A), and Lyn (2nd in the 2. divisjon - Group B). Djerv 1919 won and was promoted to the 1. divisjon.

Results

- Lyn – Djerv 1919 0–1
- Hamarkameratene – Lyn 1–1
- Djerv 1919 – Hamarkameratene 3–0

Table

Pos	Team	Pld	W	D	L	GF	GA	GD	Pts	Promotion or relegation
1	Djerv 1919 (O, P)	2	2	0	0	4	0	+4	6	Promoted to the First Division
2	Lyn	2	0	1	1	1	2	−1	1	Remained in the Second Division
3	HamKam (R)	2	0	1	1	1	4	−3	1	Relegated to the Second Division

Source: rsssf.no
(O) Play-off winners; (P) Promoted; (R) Relegated

== Season statistics ==
=== Top scorers ===
Rank	Player	Club	Goals
1	(Norway) Jan Kristian Fjærestad	Moss	18
2	(Norway) Cato Holtet	Kongsvinger	11
3	(Norway) Jan Åge Fjørtoft	Ham-Kam	10
4	(Norway) Geir Henæs	Moss	9
4	(Norway) André Nieuwlaat	Rosenborg	9
4	(Norway) Børre Meinseth	Bryne	9
7	(Norway) Carsten Bachke	Moss	8
7	(Norway) Arne Larsen Økland	Bryne	8
9	(Norway) Jan Berg	Molde	7
9	(Norway) Arnfinn Engerbakk	Kongsvinger	7
9	(Norway) Sten Glenn Håberg	Lillestrøm	7
9	(Norway) Kjetil Rekdal	Molde	7
9	(Norway) Gøran Sørloth	Rosenborg	7

=== Attendances ===
Pos	Team	Total	High	Low	Average	Change
1	Brann	90,907	15,320	6,013	8,264	n/a^{2}
2	Rosenborg	57,340	15,293	1,170	5,213	−20.2%
3	Molde	48,738	14,793	2,545	4,431	+64.0%
4	Tromsø	37,306	5,350	2,099	3,391	+2.0%
5	Lillestrøm	35,693	6,270	2,207	3,245	−16.6%
6	Bryne	32,157	5,088	2,018	2,923	−7.1%
7	Moss	31,792	4,095	2,118	2,890	n/a^{2}
8	HamKam	29,900	3,563	1,695	2,718	−14.2%
9	Vålerengen	28,009	4,833	1,606	2,546	−14.5%
10	Start	27,423	4,012	1,070	2,493	−17.6%
11	Kongsvinger	25,706	3,213	1,493	2,337	+1.4%
12	Mjøndalen	21,886	2,863	1,217	1,990	−4.7%
	League total	466,857	15,320	1,070	3,537	+8.5%

Source: nifs.no
Notes:
2: Team played last season in 2. divisjon.
