= 1986 Norwegian First Division =

42nd season of top-tier football league in Norway

1. divisjon
- Season: 1986
- Dates: 27 April – 19 October
- Champions: Lillestrøm; 4th title
- Relegated: Viking; Strømmen
- European Cup: Lillestrøm
- UEFA Cup: Mjøndalen
- Cup Winners' Cup: Tromsø
- Matches played: 132
- Goals scored: 352 (2.67 per match)
- Top goalscorer: Arve Seland (12 goals)
- Biggest home win: Mjøndalen 4–0 Kongsvinger (7 June 1986); Viking 4–0 Strømmen (5 October 1986); Start 6–2 Tromsø (19 October 1986)
- Biggest away win: Molde 0–4 Start (4 May 1986)
- Highest scoring: Viking 6–4 Ham-Kam (7 September 1986)
- Highest attendance: 28,569; Rosenborg 3–2 Tromsø (16 May 1986)
- Lowest attendance: 202; Strømmen 1–2 Mjøndalen (19 October 1986)
- Average attendance: 3,261 ▼24.3%

The 1986 1. divisjon was the 42nd completed season of top division football in Norway. The season began on 27 April 1986 and ended on 19 October 1986.

22 games were played with 2 points given for wins and 1 for draws. Number eleven and twelve were relegated. The winners of the two groups of the 2. divisjon were promoted, as well as the winner of a series of play-off matches between the two second-placed teams in the two groups of the 2. divisjon and number ten in the 1. divisjon.

Lillestrøm SK won the league, after a slow start but later 11 consecutive wins. It was Lillestrøm's fourth title. Viking and Strømmen were relegated to the 2. divisjon. The league had low attendances this year.

== Teams and locations ==
Note: Table lists in alphabetical order.

Team	Ap.	Location	Stadium
Bryne	11	Bryne	Bryne Stadion
HamKam	13	Hamar	Briskeby
Kongsvinger	4	Kongsvinger	Gjemselund Stadion
Lillestrøm	23	Lillestrøm	Åråsen Stadion
Mjøndalen	16	Mjøndalen	Nedre Eiker Stadion
Molde	12	Molde	Molde Stadion
Rosenborg	23	Trondheim	Lerkendal Stadion
Start	19	Kristiansand	Kristiansand Stadion
Strømmen	12	Strømmen	Strømmen Stadion
Tromsø	1	Tromsø	Alfheim Stadion
Vålerengen	31	Oslo	Bislett Stadion
Viking	39	Stavanger	Stavanger Stadion

== League table ==
Pos	Team	Pld	W	D	L	GF	GA	GD	Pts	Qualification or relegation
1	Lillestrøm (C)	22	16	1	5	40	17	+23	33	Qualification for the European Cup first round
2	Mjøndalen	22	11	5	6	36	25	+11	27	Qualification for the UEFA Cup first round
3	Kongsvinger	22	11	5	6	27	27	0	27	
4	Start	22	9	6	7	31	22	+9	24	
5	HamKam	22	8	8	6	34	30	+4	24	
6	Bryne	22	11	1	10	32	31	+1	23	
7	Vålerengen	22	9	4	9	29	28	+1	22	
8	Rosenborg	22	8	5	9	28	28	0	21	
9	Molde	22	7	6	9	26	33	−7	20	
10	Tromsø (Note: Tromsø qualified for the UEFA Cup Winners' Cup as Norwegian Cup winners.) (O)	22	6	6	10	23	32	−9	18	Cup Winners' Cup first round and relegation play-offs
11	Viking (R)	22	5	7	10	23	33	−10	17	Relegation to Second Division
12	Strømmen (R)	22	2	4	16	23	46	−23	8	Relegation to Second Division

Source: nifs.no
(C) Champions; (O) Play-off winners; (R) Relegated

== Results ==
Home \ Away	BRY	HAM	KON	LIL	MIF	MOL	ROS	IKS	SØM	TRO	VIK	VÅL
Bryne	—	0–2	4–1	0–2	0–1	1–3	3–1	1–0	4–1	2–1	2–0	0–1
HamKam	2–0	—	2–1	2–3	3–2	1–1	1–1	2–2	1–0	2–0	1–1	3–5
Kongsvinger	1–0	2–1	—	1–0	0–0	0–0	2–1	0–0	3–0	1–1	1–0	2–1
Lillestrøm	3–0	0–2	4–1	—	3–1	3–0	1–0	3–1	1–0	2–0	3–1	3–0
Mjøndalen	4–2	0–0	4–0	2–0	—	2–0	0–2	3–4	3–1	2–0	0–1	4–1
Molde	1–3	2–2	0–2	0–1	2–2	—	1–0	0–4	1–4	1–1	2–0	1–2
Rosenborg	3–2	1–0	1–3	1–1	3–0	1–1	—	1–0	3–0	3–2	4–1	1–2
Start	0–1	1–0	0–1	2–0	0–0	1–0	2–0	—	2–1	6–2	2–2	1–2
Strømmen	3–4	0–1	4–1	1–2	1–2	1–3	1–1	1–1	—	1–2	0–0	1–3
Tromsø	0–1	1–1	3–2	2–1	1–2	0–2	2–0	0–0	1–1	—	2–0	1–1
Viking	1–2	6–4	1–1	0–3	1–1	0–2	0–0	1–2	4–0	1–0	—	1–0
Vålerengen	0–0	1–1	0–1	0–1	0–1	2–3	3–0	1–0	3–1	0–1	1–1	—

Source: nifs.no (in Norwegian)
Legend: Blue = home team win; Yellow = draw; Red = away team win.

== Relegation play-offs ==
The qualification matches were contested between Tromsø (10th in the 1. divisjon), Drøbak/Frogn (2nd in the 2. divisjon - Group A), and Vidar (2nd in the 2. divisjon - Group B). Tromsø won and remained in the 1. divisjon.

Results

- Drøbak/Frogn – Vidar 1–2
- Tromsø – Drøbak/Frogn 2–0
- Vidar – Tromsø 0–1

Pos	Team	Pld	W	D	L	GF	GA	GD	Pts	Promotion or relegation
1	Tromsø (O)	2	2	0	0	3	0	+3	4	Remained in the First Division
2	Vidar	2	1	0	1	2	2	0	2	Remained in the Second Division
3	Drøbak/Frogn	2	0	0	2	1	4	−3	0	Remained in the Second Division

Source: rsssf.no
(O) Play-off winners

== Season statistics ==
=== Top scorers ===
Rank	Player	Club	Goals
1	(Norway) Arve Seland	Start	12
2	(Norway) Freddy Ørbeck	Mjøndalen	11
3	(Norway) Arne Larsen Økland	Bryne	10
4	(Norway) Paul Folkvord	Bryne	9
4	(Norway) Sten Glenn Håberg	Lillestrøm	9
4	(Norway) Odd Johnsen	Mjøndalen	9
7	(Norway) Paal Fredheim	Vålerengen	8
8	(Norway) Sverre Brandhaug	Rosenborg	7
8	(Norway) Jan Åge Fjørtoft	Ham-Kam	7
8	(Norway) Egil Johansen	Vålerengen	7
8	(Norway) Tore Kallstad	Strømmen	7

=== Attendances ===
Pos	Team	Total	High	Low	Average	Change
1	Rosenborg	71,818	19,325	2,593	6,529	−36.8%
2	Viking	47,732	11,300	1,932	4,339	−29.5%
3	Lillestrøm	42,806	5,896	1,112	3,891	−19.4%
4	Tromsø	36,589	6,118	756	3,326	n/a^{2}
5	HamKam	34,821	5,038	1,244	3,166	n/a^{2}
6	Bryne	34,600	5,025	1,891	3,145	−13.0%
7	Start	30,240	6,335	1,101	3,024	n/a^{2}
8	Vålerengen	32,747	6,284	919	2,977	−33.3%
9	Molde	29,719	5,350	1,350	2,702	−0.4%
10	Kongsvinger	25,360	4,532	1,381	2,305	−19.2%
11	Mjøndalen	22,972	3,717	749	2,088	−11.8%
12	Strømmen	14,476	4,061	202	1,448	n/a^{2}
	League total	423,880	19,325	202	3,261	−24.3%

Source: nifs.no
Notes:
2: Team played last season in 2. divisjon.
