= Carsten Bachke =

Norwegian footballer (born 1963)

Personal information
- Full name: Carsten Anders Bachke
- Date of birth: 14 October 1963 (age 63)
- Position: Midfielder

Senior career*
Years	Team	Apps	(Gls)
–1984	Ekholt		
1985–1990	Moss		

International career
1987–1988	Norway	6	(0)
- * Club domestic league appearances and goals

Carsten Bachke (born 14 October 1963) is a retired Norwegian football midfielder. He joined Moss FK from Ekholt BK ahead of the 1985 season. Following a career where he won the Norwegian league in 1987 and was capped 6 times for Norway, he retired after the 1990 season.
