= 1987 in Norwegian football =

Football in Norway
- Season: 1987

Men's football
- 1. divisjon: Moss
- 2. divisjon: Sogndal (Group A); Strømmen (Group B)
- Cupen: Bryne

Women's football
- 1. divisjon: Klepp
- Cupen: Sprint/Jeløy

The 1987 season was the 82nd season of competitive football in Norway.

== Men's football ==
=== League season ===
==== Promotion and relegation ====
League	Promoted to league	Relegated from league
1. divisjon	Moss; Brann	Viking; Strømmen
2. divisjon	Bodø/Glimt; Lyn; Odd; Råde; Strindheim; Varegg	Bærum; Grand Bodø; Jerv; Mo; Steinkjer; Strømsgodset

==== 1. divisjon ====
For the first time in the Norwegian top flight, three rather than two points were given for wins. There was also another, more controversial new rule for points: if a match was drawn, two points would be given to the winner of a penalty shootout, and one point to the loser of the shootout. This rule, suggested by Tom A. Schanke and appointed by the Norwegian Football Association in February 1987, was highly controversial and liquidated after the 1987 season. Note that if draws would end as draws with one point to each, as usual, Tromsø IL would have been placed 10th with a possibility of being relegated.

Moss FK, coached by Nils Arne Eggen, won the league for the first and, as of the 2019 season, last time. The victory was not settled until the final round of the league, with Moss beating runners-up Molde FK (who would have grabbed the gold if they defeated Moss) 2–0 at away grounds.

Pos	Team	Pld	W	PKW	PKL	L	GF	GA	GD	Pts	Qualification or relegation
1	Moss (C)	22	13	2	1	6	44	30	+14	44	Qualification for the European Cup first round
2	Molde	22	11	3	2	6	27	20	+7	41	Qualification for the UEFA Cup first round
3	Kongsvinger	22	9	4	4	5	32	22	+10	39	
4	Rosenborg	22	8	4	7	3	33	25	+8	39	
5	Bryne	22	11	0	1	10	32	27	+5	34	Qualification for the Cup Winners' Cup preliminary round
6	Tromsø	22	5	7	2	8	19	31	−12	31	
7	Vålerengen	22	8	1	4	9	26	27	−1	30	
8	Brann	22	7	3	3	9	25	28	−3	30	
9	Lillestrøm	22	7	3	2	10	22	21	+1	29	
10	HamKam (R)	22	7	3	2	10	27	34	−7	29	Qualification for the relegation play-offs
11	Mjøndalen (R)	22	6	2	3	11	26	34	−8	25	Relegation to the Second Division
12	Start (R)	22	6	2	3	11	30	44	−14	25	Relegation to the Second Division

Source: nifs.no
(C) Champion; (R) Relegated

==== 2. divisjon ====
===== Group A =====
Pos	Team	Pld	W	PKW	PKL	L	GF	GA	GD	Pts	Promotion, qualification or relegation
1	Sogndal (C, P)	22	13	4	2	3	43	21	+22	49	Promotion to First Division
2	Djerv 1919 (O, P)	22	13	0	5	4	36	22	+14	44	Qualification for the promotion play-offs
3	Vidar	22	13	1	2	6	48	34	+14	43	
4	Fredrikstad	22	13	0	1	8	50	38	+12	40	
5	Drøbak/Frogn	22	8	4	3	7	33	21	+12	35	
6	Faaberg	22	8	3	5	6	26	27	−1	35	
7	Odd	22	9	1	4	8	41	31	+10	33	
8	Viking	22	7	5	1	9	31	27	+4	32	
9	Vard	22	6	5	1	10	25	32	−7	29	
10	Raufoss (R)	22	6	2	2	12	24	48	−24	24	Relegation to Third Division
11	Råde (R)	22	3	2	4	13	23	45	−22	17	Relegation to Third Division
12	Varegg (R)	22	2	4	1	15	24	58	−34	15	Relegation to Third Division

Source: rsssf.no
Rules for classification: 1) points; 2) goal difference; 3) number of goals scored.
(C) Champion; (O) Play-off winner; (P) Promoted; (R) Relegated

===== Group B =====
Pos	Team	Pld	W	PKW	PKL	L	GF	GA	GD	Pts	Promotion, qualification or relegation
1	Strømmen (C, P)	22	13	2	3	4	44	32	+12	46	Promotion to First Division
2	Lyn	22	11	2	5	4	38	29	+9	42	Qualification for the promotion play-offs
3	Aalesund	22	10	3	3	6	45	35	+10	39	
4	Mjølner	22	7	8	2	5	33	24	+9	39	
5	Namsos	22	8	5	1	8	37	36	+1	35	
6	Sunndal	21	8	2	3	8	28	33	−5	31	
7	Bodø/Glimt	22	9	0	4	9	38	33	+5	31	
8	Eik	22	7	3	4	8	31	28	+3	31	
9	Strindheim	22	6	5	2	9	25	37	−12	30	
10	Ørn-Horten (R)	22	8	2	2	10	38	36	+2	30	Relegation to Third Division
11	Skeid (R)	22	4	3	5	10	25	35	−10	23	Relegation to Third Division
12	Hødd (R)	22	4	0	4	14	23	47	−24	16	Relegation to Third Division

Source: rsssf.no
Rules for classification: 1) points; 2) goal difference; 3) number of goals scored.
(C) Champion; (P) Promoted; (R) Relegated

=== Norwegian Cup ===
==== Final ====
25 October 1987
13:15 CEST (UTC+2)

Bryne	1–0 (a.e.t.)	Brann
Ekker 102'	Report

Ullevaal Stadion, Oslo
Attendance: 23,080
Referee: Kjell Nordby (Rygge)

== Women's football ==
=== League season ===
==== 1. divisjon ====
Pos	Team	Pld	W	PKW	PKL	L	GF	GA	GD	Pts	Relegation
1	Klepp (C)	18	11	3	0	4	44	23	+21	39	
2	Sprint/Jeløy	18	10	2	2	4	42	16	+26	36	
3	Asker	18	8	3	2	5	38	32	+6	32	
4	Sandviken	18	9	2	0	7	34	24	+10	31	
5	Bøler	18	8	2	2	6	30	22	+8	30	
6	Trondheims-Ørn	18	8	2	2	6	17	20	−3	30	
7	Setskog	18	7	0	4	7	25	35	−10	25	
8	BUL	18	6	1	1	10	24	29	−5	21	
9	Troll (R)	18	2	2	3	11	17	33	−16	13	Relegation to Second Division
10	Grand (R)	18	4	0	1	13	17	54	−37	13	Relegation to Second Division

(C) Champion; (R) Relegated

=== Norwegian Women's Cup ===
==== Final ====
- Sprint/Jeløy 2–1 Klepp

== UEFA competitions ==
=== European Cup ===
==== First round ====
Team 1	Agg.	Team 2	1st leg	2nd leg
Lillestrøm (Norway)	5–3	(Northern Ireland) Linfield	1–1	4–2

==== Second round ====
Team 1	Agg.	Team 2	1st leg	2nd leg
Lillestrøm (Norway)	0–1	(France) Bordeaux	0–0	0–1

=== European Cup Winners' Cup ===
==== First round ====
Team 1	Agg.	Team 2	1st leg	2nd leg
St Mirren (Scotland)	1–0	(Norway) Tromsø	1–0	0–0

=== UEFA Cup ===
==== First round ====
Team 1	Agg.	Team 2	1st leg	2nd leg
Mjøndalen (Norway)	1–5	(West Germany) Werder Bremen	0–5 (Report)	1–0 (Report)

== National teams ==
=== Norway men's national football team ===
==== Results ====
Source:
