= Farstad =

Farstad is a surname. Notable people with the surname include:

- Christian Farstad (born 1969), Canadian bobsleigher
- Pål Farstad (born 1959), Norwegian politician
- Sverre Farstad (1920–1978), Norwegian speed skater
- Thomas Farstad (born 2003), Norwegian actor, famous for his role of Moses in the 2023 short film Jesus The Return

== See also ==
- Farstad Shipping, Norwegian shipping company
- Solstad Farstad, Norwegian shipping company
