= Andreas Thorud =

Norwegian footballer (born 1984)

Personal information
- Full name: Andreas Aas Thorud
- Date of birth: 14 February 1984 (age 42)
- Height: 1.90 m (6 ft 3 in)
- Position: Defender

Senior career*
Years	Team	Apps	(Gls)
- Skjetten
2003–2004	Lillestrøm	8	(0)
2007	Lørenskog		
2008	Manglerud Star		
2009	Lørenskog		
- * Club domestic league appearances and goals

Andreas Aas Thorud (born 14 February 1984) is a Norwegian former defender.

Thorud started his career in Skjetten SK. He was brought to regional greats Lillestrøm SK ahead of the 2003 season. He got one Norwegian Premier League game in 2003, and five in 2004, without scoring. In total, Thorud played 30 games for Lillestrøm and made 1 goal. In 2004, he was awarded the "Show Racism the Red Card-prize" by NISO and Norsk Folkehjelp for his work and writings against racism.

After the 2004 season he made something of a shock move when he retired from professional football, only 20 years old, even though the new coach Uwe Røsler wanted to give him the chance as a first team regular. Ahead of the 2007 season, he signed for Lørenskog IF after extensive studies and traveling in America, Asia and Europe. Ahead of the 2008 season he was wanted by second-tier club Sandnes Ulf, but joined Manglerud Star to stay in Oslo. After one season he returned to Lørenskog but made his final retirement from football in June 2009.

He studied philosophy, religious history, theology, psychology and sociology at the University of Oslo in the period 2004-2014. His masters thesis in philosophy is a study of the Russian-born French philosopher Alexandre Kojève with the title "Amicus Alexandre Kojève".

Thorud is certified as a Philosophical Practitioner through the Norwegian Society for Philosophical Practice.
