= Steinar Aulie =

Norwegian footballer (born 1959)

Personal information
- Date of birth: 6 September 1959 (age 67)
- Position: Defender

International career
| Years | Team | Apps | (Gls) |
| 1982 | Norway | 1 | (0) |

Steinar Aulie (born 6 September 1959) is a Norwegian footballer. He played in one match for the Norway national football team in 1982.
