= Jan Madsen =

Norwegian footballer (born 1965)

Personal information
- Date of birth: 9 January 1965 (age 61)

International career
Years	Team	Apps	(Gls)
1988	Norway	1	(0)

Jan Madsen (born 9 January 1965) is a Norwegian footballer. He played in one match for the Norway national football team in 1988.
