= Vidar Sanderud =

Norwegian footballer (born 1961)

Vidar Sanderud (born 14 December 1961) is a retired Norwegian football defender.

He played for Disenå IL and Oppstad IL before joining Kongsvinger IL. Between 1983 and 1993 he played 219 Norwegian Premier League games and scored 16 goals. He also featured in their 1993–94 UEFA Cup run, and retired after their loss to Juventus FC.

He started working in Vital Forsikring, and was later hired in the Football Association of Norway.
