= Åge Hareide =

Norwegian football player and coach (1953–2025)

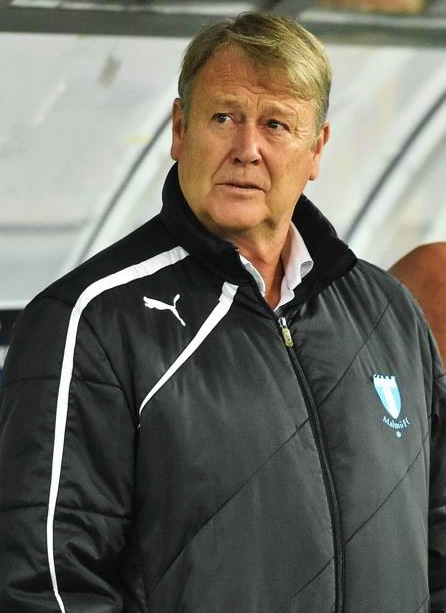
- Hareide as Malmö manager in 2015

Personal information
- Full name: Åge Fridtjof Hareide
- Date of birth: 23 September 1953
- Place of birth: Hareid Municipality, Norway
- Date of death: 18 December 2025 (aged 72)
- Place of death: Molde Municipality, Norway
- Position: Defender

Senior career*
Years	Team	Apps	(Gls)
1970–1975	Hødd	37	(2)
1975–1981	Molde	93	(21)
1981–1982	Manchester City	24	(0)
1982–1984	Norwich City	40	(2)
1984–1987	Molde	72	(10)
Total		266	(35)

International career
1976–1986	Norway	50	(5)

Managerial career
- 1985–1991: Molde
- 1993–1997: Molde
- 1998–1999: Helsingborg
- 2000–2002: Brøndby
- 2003: Rosenborg
- 2003–2008: Norway
- 2009: Örgryte
- 2009–2012: Viking
- 2012: Helsingborg (caretaker)
- 2014–2015: Malmö FF
- 2016–2020: Denmark
- 2020–2021: Rosenborg
- 2022: Malmö FF (caretaker)
- 2023–2024: Iceland
- * Club domestic league appearances and goals

Åge Fridtjof Hareide (23 September 1953 – 18 December 2025) was a Norwegian football player and coach. In his playing career, he played for Hødd and Molde in Norway as well as Manchester City and Norwich City in England. Hareide was capped 50 times playing for Norway. In his coaching career he managed multiple clubs, as well as the national teams of Norway, Denmark, and Iceland.

As a coach, Hareide won league titles in all of the Scandinavian countries, In Sweden with Helsingborgs IF in 1999 and with Malmö FF in 2014, in Denmark with Brøndby in 2001–02 and in his native Norway with Rosenborg in 2003. Hareide was in charge of the Norway national team from 2003 to 2008. While at Malmö during his first time in charge at the club, he notably took the team to the modern-day UEFA Champions League group stages for the first two times in the club's history. He coached Denmark to a round of 16 finish at the 2018 FIFA World Cup before appointed coach of Iceland in 2023. Following his time with Iceland, he announced his retirement from coaching.

== Playing career ==
During his playing career, Hareide played for Hødd, Molde, Manchester City and Norwich City. When Hareide made his debut for Manchester City on 24 October 1981, he became only the second Norwegian player (after Einar Aas) to play in the English top division.

He was also an active player for the Norway national team between 1976 and 1986, scoring five goals in 50 matches. Among the highlights of Hareide's international career was the 2–1 victory against England in a 1981 World Cup qualifier, and the 3–1 win against Yugoslavia in a 1983 European Championship qualifier where Hareide scored the third goal.

== Coaching career ==
As a coach Hareide has won three European countries' national league championships, namely that of Denmark, Sweden and his native Norway, making him the only coach to have won the league in three Scandinavian countries. Other coaches who have won league titles in three countries include fellow Scandinavians Trond Sollied and Sven-Göran Eriksson, while Ernst Happel, Giovanni Trapattoni, José Mourinho and Carlo Ancelotti have won championships in four countries.

=== Early managerial career ===
In the mid-1990s, Norwegian millionaires Kjell Inge Røkke and Bjørn Rune Gjelsten were reportedly interested in bringing Hareide back to Manchester City as manager if their bid to take over the club was successful, but the takeover bid failed and Hareide never returned to the club. When the pair tried to take over Leeds United around the same time, it was once again reported that Hareide would be installed as manager if the takeover bid succeeded, but this bid too failed and Hareide was never put in charge at Elland Road. However, the pair finally succeeded in a takeover bid for fellow English Premier League club Wimbledon in June 1997, and Hareide appeared all set to become the new manager of the club in a move that would have ousted the incumbent Joe Kinnear. But this never happened either.

=== Norway ===
Hareide was employed as the coach of the Norway national football team at the end of 2003, replacing Nils Johan Semb, after one season as coach of Rosenborg. On 8 December 2008, after having failed to take Norway to any international tournaments, and having had a bad start to the 2010 FIFA World Cup qualifying campaign, Hareide resigned from his position as national team coach of Norway. On 9 December 2008, Hareide announced that he was stepping down as coach of the Norway national team.

=== Viking ===
On 10 June 2009, it was announced that he would be coaching Örgryte. On 1 December 2009, the former Norway national team head coach left the Swedish club to join Viking, from Stavanger to replace Uwe Rösler. Following Egil Østenstad resignation as director of football in Viking, Viking announced in September 2011 that Hareide would be manager of Viking, and that Josep Clotet Ruiz would be hired as coach from the 2012-season onwards, similar to the organization English clubs and Molde have, with Ole Gunnar Solskjær as manager and Mark Dempsey as coach. Viking finished 9th in 2010, Hareide's first season, and 11th in 2011. With the team positioned on 10th place on 9 June 2012, Hareide was released by Viking because of the bad results.

=== Second spell at Helsingborg ===
Following Conny Karlsson's resignation in Helsingborgs IF, the club hired Hareide, the last coach who won Allsvenskan with Helsingborgs IF, except Karlsson, as head coach until the end of the 2012 season.

=== Malmö FF ===
Hareide was brought out of retirement from his managerial career by being appointed the new manager of the reigning Swedish champions Malmö FF on 9 January 2014. He had immediate success at the club as he led the team to defend their Allsvenskan title and qualify for the group stage of the 2014–15 UEFA Champions League in his first season. For this successful season Hareide was awarded Allsvenskan manager of the year. He was also nominated for coach of the year at Svenska idrottsgalan.

=== Denmark ===
On 10 December 2015, Hareide was announced as the new manager of the Denmark national football team replacing Morten Olsen, who had stepped down following the UEFA Euro 2016 qualification. Hareide began his new job on 1 March 2016. In November 2017, he managed his Denmark team to qualification for the 2018 FIFA World Cup in Russia. This was achieved with a 5-1 aggregate play-off win over Ireland.

Hareide was the Danish coach at the 2018 FIFA World Cup. He managed Denmark to 2nd place in their group before they were eliminated in the round of 16 in a penalty shootout against Croatia.

Hareide continued as manager of in the UEFA Euro 2020 qualifying. Under his leadership Denmark qualified for the UEFA Euro 2020. It was revealed that Kasper Hjulmand would replace him as manager of the Danish team following the tournament. However, due to the COVID-19 pandemic the tournament was postponed, and Hareide's contract expired. When he left he had not lost in ordinary time for the last 34 games, and his last defeat was on 11 October 2016 against Montenegro.

=== Rosenborg ===
In August 2020, he became the head coach of Rosenborg for a second tenure.

=== Malmö FF ===
In September 2022, Hareide was announced as the new interim manager for Malmö FF.

=== Iceland ===
On 14 April 2023, Hareide was announced as the new manager of the Iceland national football team. He resigned from his position on 25 November 2024. A day later, he announced his retirement from coaching.

== Media career ==
Hareide resigned as the Norway national team coach then worked as an expert Norwegian Premier League commentator for the Norwegian Broadcasting Corporation.

== Death ==
On 24 November 2025, it was revealed that Hareide had been diagnosed with brain cancer earlier in the year. Hareide later died on 18 December 2025, aged 72.

== Career statistics ==
=== Club ===
Appearances and goals by club, season and competition
Club	Season	League			Cup		Other		Total	
Club	Season	Division	Apps	Goals	Apps	Goals	Apps	Goals	Apps	Goals
Hødd	1970	First Division	1	0						
Hødd	1971	First Division	16	1						
Hødd	1972	First Division	20	1						
Hødd	1973	Second Division								
Hødd	1974	Second Division								
Hødd	1975	Second Division								
Hødd	Total									
Molde	1975	First Division	9	3						
Molde	1976	First Division	22	9						
Molde	1977	First Division	21	7						
Molde	1978	First Division	19	2						
Molde	1979	Second Division								
Molde	1980	First Division	22	0						
Molde	1981	Second Division								
Molde	Total									
Manchester City	1981–82	First Division	16	0						
Manchester City	1982–83	First Division	8	0						
Manchester City	Total		24	0						
Norwich City	1982–83	First Division	12	0						
Norwich City	1983–84	First Division	28	2						
Norwich City	Total		40	2						
Molde	1984	First Division	17	3						
Molde	1985	First Division	22	3						
Molde	1986	First Division	18	3						
Molde	1987	First Division	15	1						
Molde	Total		72	10						
Career total										

=== International ===
Scores and results list Norway's goal tally first, score column indicates score after each Hareide goal.

List of international goals scored by Åge Hareide
No.	Date	Venue	Opponent	Score	Result	Competition
1	29 October 1980	Bern, Switzerland	Switzerland	1–0	2–1	1982 FIFA World Cup qualification
2	15 June 1982	Oslo, Norway	Denmark	1–0	2–1	1981–85 Nordic Football Championship
3	13 October 1982	Oslo, Norway	Yugoslavia	3–1	3–1	UEFA Euro 1984 qualifying
4	7 September 1983	Oslo, Norway	Bulgaria	1–0	1–2	UEFA Euro 1984 qualifying

== Managerial statistics ==
Team	From	To	Record				
Team	From	To	G^{1}	W	D	L	Win %
Molde^{2}	1986; 1993	1991; 1997	239	107	58	74	44.77
Helsingborgs IF	1 January 1998	31 December 1999	76	43	17	16	56.58
Brøndby^{2}	1 January 2000	15 April 2002	93	48	23	22	51.61
Rosenborg	1 January 2003	27 November 2003	43	32	6	5	74.42
Norway	1 January 2004	8 December 2008	58	24	18	16	41.38
Örgryte	10 June 2009	1 December 2009	18	6	5	7	33.33
Viking	1 December 2009	9 June 2012	81	31	23	27	38.27
Helsingborgs IF	14 June 2012	6 December 2012	31	14	7	10	45.16
Malmö FF	9 January 2014	9 December 2015	95	49	20	26	51.58
Denmark	1 March 2016	31 July 2020	42	21	18	3	50.00
Rosenborg	1 September 2020	31 December 2021	55	28	12	15	50.91
Malmö FF	6 September 2022	31 December 2022	15	3	3	9	20.00
Iceland	14 April 2023	25 November 2024	20	8	2	10	40.00
Total			866	414	212	240	47.81

^{1} Only competitive matches are counted.
^{2} For these earlier statistics, only league matches are collected.

== Honours ==
=== Manager ===
Molde

- Norwegian Football Cup: 1994

Helsingborgs IF

- Allsvenskan: 1999
- Svenska Cupen: 1997–98

Brøndby

- Danish Superliga: 2001–02

Rosenborg

- Tippeligaen: 2003
- Norwegian Football Cup: 2003

Malmö FF

- Allsvenskan: 2014
- Svenska Supercupen: 2014

=== Individual ===
- Allsvenskan Manager of the Year: 2014
