= Jan Kristian Fjærestad =

Norwegian footballer (born 1963)

Personal information
- Date of birth: 4 September 1963 (age 63)
- Place of birth: Moss, Norway
- Position: Forward

Senior career*
Years	Team	Apps	(Gls)
1982–1983	Hafslund IF		
1984–1990	Moss FK		

International career
1987–1988	Norway MNT	5	(1)
- * Club domestic league appearances and goals

Jan Kristian Fjærestad (born 4 September 1963) is a retired Norwegian football striker. He played for Moss F.K., and became the Norwegian Premier League's top goalscorer with 18 goals in 1987, the season Moss won the league title.

The same year Fjærestad was called up to represent the national team by the new coach Tord Grip. Fjærestad was capped seven times, scoring once.
