= Cato Holtet =

Norwegian footballer (born 1963)

Cato Holtet (born 3 March 1963) is a retired Norwegian football striker.

He played for Eidsvold IF and Lillestrøm SK before joining Kongsvinger IL ahead of the 1985 season. Between 1985 and 1990 he scored 46 goals in 95 Norwegian Premier League games for the club. This is still a club record. He joined Flisa IL ahead of the 1991 season.
