= Rune Ulvestad =

Norwegian footballer and coach (born 1957)

Personal information
- Full name: Rune Ivar Ulvestad
- Date of birth: 28 March 1957 (age 69)
- Place of birth: Norway
- Position: Forward

Senior career*
Years	Team	Apps	(Gls)
1977	Brattvåg		
1978–1986	Molde		
1987–1988	Aalesund		
- * Club domestic league appearances and goals

Rune Ulvestad (born 28 March 1957) is a Norwegian football coach and former player. He played as a forward for Molde from 1978 to 1986. After his active career, Ulvestad has been coaching Herd. He is the father of the footballers Pål Erik, Fredrik and Dan Peter Ulvestad.

== Career ==
After playing for Brattvåg IL, Ulvestad joined Molde FK ahead of the 1978-season, and was Molde's top goalscorer in 1981 and 1985. Ulvestad scored Molde's first goal in the final of the 1982 Norwegian Cup, a game Molde lost 2–3 against Brann. Ulvestad played a total of 107 matches and scored 29 goals for Molde in the top division until he joined Aalesunds FK after the 1986-season.

Ulvestad have later been coaching SK Herd.

== Personal life ==
Ulvestad is the father of the footballers Dan Peter, Pål Erik, Fredrik and Andreas. In 2011, Fredrik won the Norwegian Cup with Aalesund, while Pål Erik won Tippeligaen with Molde.
