= Knut Nesbø =

Norwegian sports reporter (1961–2013)

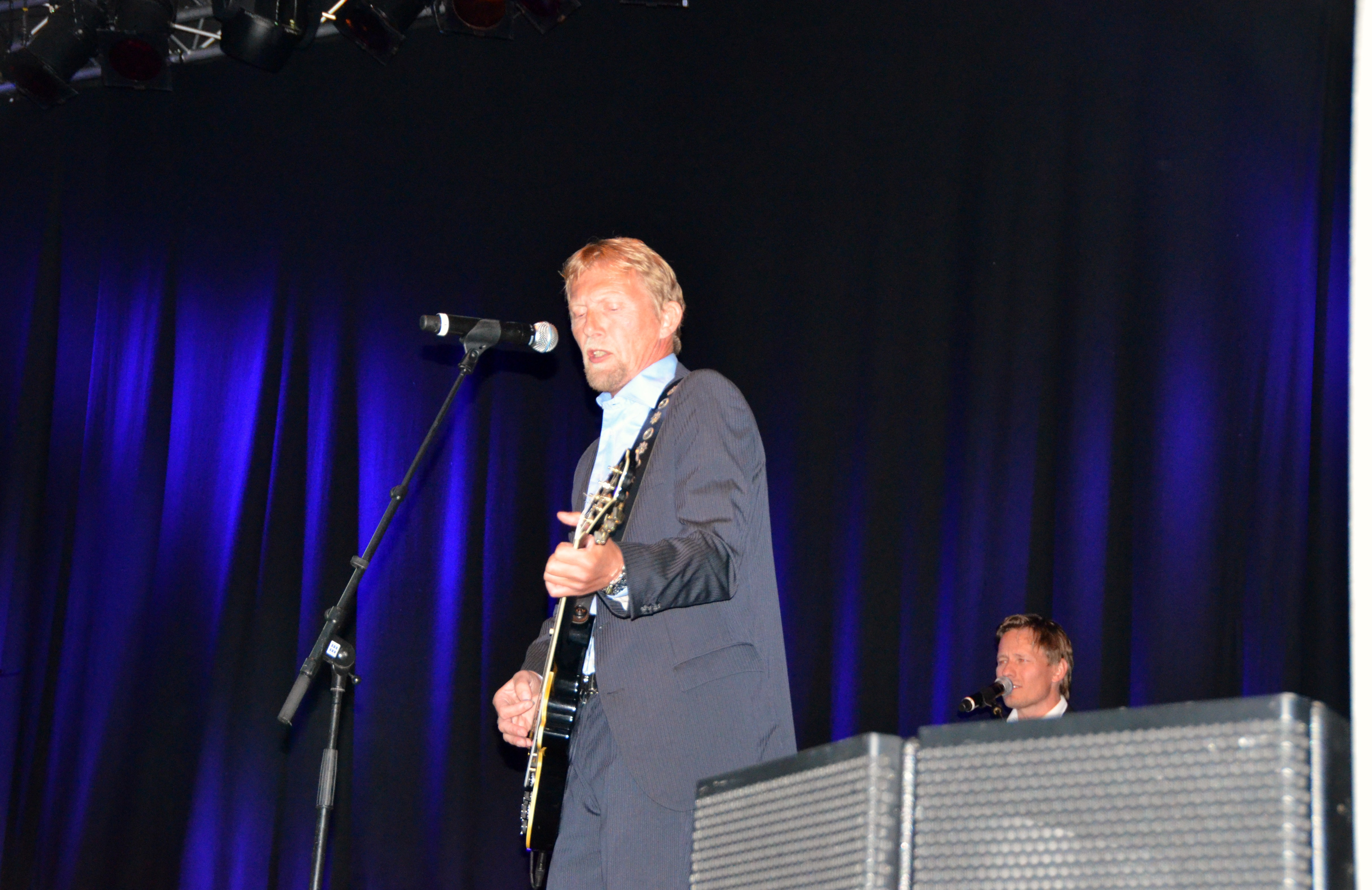
- Nesbø performing with Di Derre
- Born: 26 April 1961
- Died: 8 February 2013 (aged 51)

Knut Nesbø (26 April 1961 – 8 February 2013) was a Norwegian sports reporter with the Norwegian Broadcasting Corporation.

He was a former semi-professional footballer (soccer player) who played for Molde and Lyn in the 1980s. In 1990, he played nineteen league matches for low-level Stabæk IF. Nesbø was the guitarist of the Norwegian pop/rock band Di Derre, which also featured his brother Jo Nesbø as the lead singer. He died in 2013 of cancer.
