= Joar Vaadal =

Norwegian footballer (born 1960)

Personal information
- Born: 2 August 1960 (age 65) Steinkjer, Norway

Sport
- Sport: Football
- Club: Lillestrøm SK

Joar Vaadal (born 2 August 1960) is a Norwegian football player. He was born in Steinkjer. He played for the club Lillestrøm, and also for the Norwegian national team. He competed at the 1984 Summer Olympics in Los Angeles.
