= Arve Seland =

Norwegian footballer (born 1963)

Personal information
- Full name: Leif Arve Seland
- Date of birth: 12 December 1963 (age 62)
- Place of birth: Arendal, Norway
- Height: 1.85 m (6 ft 1 in)
- Position: Forward

Senior career*
Years	Team	Apps	(Gls)
?–1983	FK Jerv		
1984–1986	IK Start		
1986–1987	Mulhouse	10	(2)
1987–1989	K.F.C. Winterslag		
1989–1991	IK Start		
1992–?	Øyestad IF		

International career
1984–1985	Norway U21	8	(2)
1984–1987	Norway	10	(1)
- * Club domestic league appearances and goals

Leif Arve Seland (born 12 December 1963), known as Arve Seland, is a Norwegian former footballer who played as a forward. He played for IK Start, and also for the Norway national team. He competed at the 1984 Summer Olympics in Los Angeles.
