= Gjemselund Stadion =

Football stadium in Kongsvinger, Norway

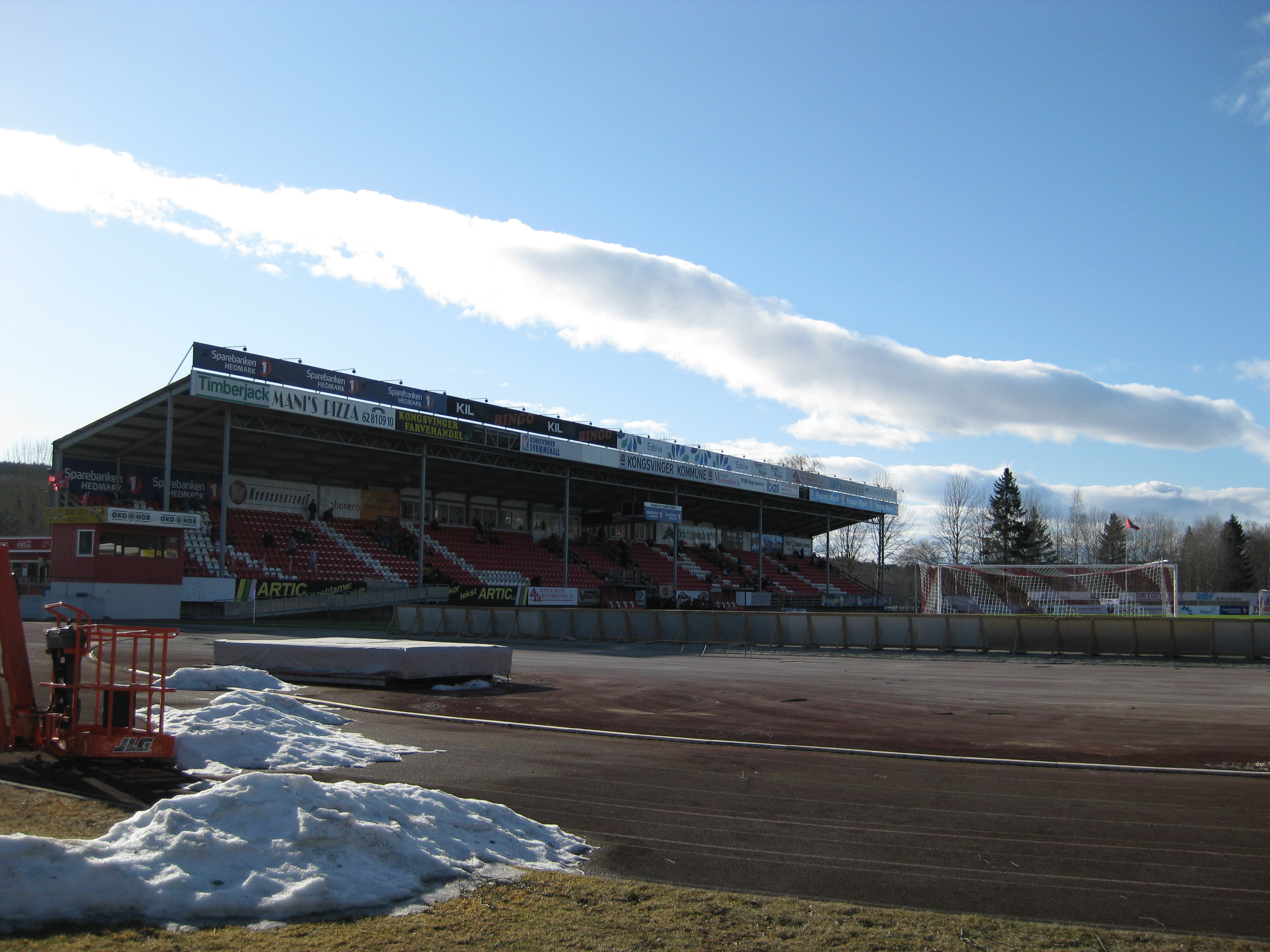
- Interactive map of Gjemselund Stadion
- Location: Kongsvinger, Innlandet, Norway
- Coordinates: 60°11′43″N 11°59′14″E
- Operator: Kongsvinger Municipality
- Capacity: 5,824
- Surface: Artificial turf
- Record attendance: 6,794 (Kongsvinger vs Vålerengen, 26 June 1983)
- Field size: 109 by 69 metres (119.2 yd × 75.5 yd)

Construction
- Opened: 14 June 1953
- Expanded: 1982, 1986–87, 2010

Tenants
- KIL Toppfotball; KIL Fotball

Gjemselund Stadion is a football stadium in the town of Kongsvinger in Kongsvinger Municipality in Innlandet county, Norway and the home ground of Norwegian second tier club Kongsvinger IL Toppfotball.

Until 2008, it was also used for track and field meets, having got rubber track in 1986. The venue hosted the Norwegian Athletics Championships in 1968. The stadium received artificial turf with under-soil heating ahead of the 2009 season.

== Attendances ==
The record attendance of 6,794 spectators dates from 26 June 1983, when Kongsvinger lost a top division game against Vålerengen with the score 0–3. Capacity has since been reduced by new regulations.

=== Average attendances ===
This shows the average attendance on Kongsvinger's home games in the league since 2012.

†	1. divisjon
	2. divisjon

Attendance
Season	Avg	Min	Max	Rank	Ref.
2012	1,261	958	2,183	7†	
2013	1,043	572	2,044	9†	
2014–2015	N/A				
2016	1,595	1,254	2,852	8†	
2017	1,401	1,089	2,580	7†	
2018	1,532	1,024	2,912	7†	
