= 1962 in Norwegian football =

Football in Norway
- Season: 1962

Men's football
- Hovedserien: Brann
- Landsdelsserien: Sarpsborg (Group East/South); Gjøvik-Lyn (Group East/North); Start (Group South/West A); Haugar (Group South/West B); Aalesund (Group Møre); Kvik (Group Trøndelag)
- NM: Gjøvik-Lyn

The 1962 season was the 57th season of competitive football in Norway.

== Hovedserien 1961/62 ==
SK Brann won their first of two consecutive league championships.

Pos	Team	Pld	W	D	L	GF	GA	GD	Pts	Qualification or relegation
1	Brann (C)	30	21	4	5	94	44	+50	46	
2	Steinkjer	30	18	5	7	81	43	+38	41	
3	Fredrikstad	30	18	5	7	80	45	+35	41	Qualification for the European Cup preliminary round
4	Frigg	30	15	10	5	59	43	+16	40	
5	Lyn	30	16	5	9	86	66	+20	37	
6	Vålerengen	30	15	6	9	75	41	+34	36	
7	Viking	30	14	7	9	49	48	+1	35	
8	Skeid	30	11	11	8	63	40	+23	33	
9	Rosenborg (R)	30	14	3	13	55	60	−5	31	Relegation to Second Division
10	Odd (R)	30	10	7	13	57	68	−11	27	Relegation to Second Division
11	Eik (R)	30	9	8	13	47	59	−12	26	Relegation to Second Division
12	Sandefjord BK (R)	30	11	3	16	35	51	−16	25	Relegation to Second Division
13	Lisleby (R)	30	8	3	19	42	74	−32	19	Relegation to Second Division
14	Ørn-Horten (R)	30	7	3	20	45	91	−46	17	Relegation to Second Division
15	Greåker (R)	30	4	8	18	35	75	−40	16	Relegation to Second Division
16	Larvik Turn (R)	30	3	4	23	35	90	−55	10	Relegation to Second Division

Source: NIFS
Rules for classification: 1) points; 2) goal difference; 3) number of goals scored.
(C) Champions; (R) Relegated

First division reduced from 16 to 10 teams

== Landsdelsserien ==
=== Group Østland/Søndre ===
Pos	Team	Pld	W	D	L	GF	GA	GD	Pts	Qualification or relegation
1	Sarpsborg (O, P)	21	16	2	3	64	19	+45	34	Qualification for the promotion play-offs
2	Østsiden	21	12	3	6	46	27	+19	27	
3	Sparta (R)	21	11	4	6	43	32	+11	26	Qualification for the relegation play-offs
4	Rapid (R)	21	11	4	6	37	39	−2	26	Relegation to 3. divisjon
5	Pors (R)	21	7	4	10	36	43	−7	18	Relegation to 3. divisjon
6	Moss (R)	21	7	3	11	28	30	−2	17	Relegation to 3. divisjon
7	Fram (R)	21	5	5	11	34	42	−8	15	Relegation to 3. divisjon
8	Heddal (R)	21	1	3	17	14	70	−56	5	Relegation to 3. divisjon

Source: rsssf.no
Rules for classification: 1) points; 2) goal difference; 3) number of goals scored.
(O) Play-off winners; (P) Promoted; (R) Relegated

=== Group Østland/Nordre ===
Pos	Team	Pld	W	D	L	GF	GA	GD	Pts	Qualification or relegation
1	Gjøvik-Lyn (O, P)	21	11	8	2	49	32	+17	30	Qualification for the promotion play-offs
2	Lillestrøm	21	11	5	5	60	47	+13	27	
3	Raufoss (O)	21	8	7	6	40	39	+1	23	Qualification for the relegation play-offs
4	Strømmen (R)	21	8	7	6	27	26	+1	23	Relegation to 3. divisjon
5	Asker (R)	21	8	3	10	48	33	+15	19	Relegation to 3. divisjon
6	Aurskog (R)	21	7	5	9	40	47	−7	19	Relegation to 3. divisjon
7	Mjøndalen (R)	21	7	1	13	47	57	−10	15	Relegation to 3. divisjon
8	Hamarkameratene (R)	21	4	4	13	31	61	−30	12	Relegation to 3. divisjon

Source: rsssf.no
Rules for classification: 1) points; 2) goal difference; 3) number of goals scored.
(O) Play-off winners; (P) Promoted; (R) Relegated

=== Group Sørland/Vestland, A ===
Pos	Team	Pld	W	D	L	GF	GA	GD	Pts	Qualification or relegation
1	Start	21	14	5	2	67	27	+40	33	Qualification for the promotion play-offs
2	Jerv (R)	21	11	6	4	52	36	+16	28	Relegation to 3. divisjon
3	Grane (R)	21	7	10	4	51	50	+1	24	Relegation to 3. divisjon
4	Flekkefjord (R)	21	6	8	7	45	43	+2	20	Relegation to 3. divisjon
5	Vigør (R)	21	7	6	8	46	47	−1	20	Relegation to 3. divisjon
6	Sørfjell (R)	21	8	4	9	51	54	−3	20	Relegation to 3. divisjon
7	Vindbjart (R)	21	7	4	10	64	72	−8	18	Relegation to 3. divisjon
8	Nedenes (R)	21	1	3	17	33	80	−47	5	Relegation to 4. divisjon

Source: rsssf.no
Rules for classification: 1) points; 2) goal difference; 3) number of goals scored.
(R) Relegated

=== Group Sørland/Vestland, B ===
Pos	Team	Pld	W	D	L	GF	GA	GD	Pts	Qualification or relegation
1	Haugar	21	15	1	5	54	28	+26	31	Qualification for the promotion play-offs
2	Ulf (R)	21	14	1	6	49	21	+28	29	Relegation to 3. divisjon
3	Vard (R)	21	12	2	7	52	36	+16	26	Relegation to 3. divisjon
4	Bryne (R)	21	12	1	8	59	37	+22	25	Relegation to 3. divisjon
5	Jarl (R)	21	10	1	10	34	47	−13	21	Relegation to 3. divisjon
6	Stavanger (R)	21	7	3	11	31	34	−3	17	Relegation to 3. divisjon
7	Randaberg (R)	21	6	4	11	30	48	−18	16	Relegation to 3. divisjon
8	Buøy (R)	21	1	1	19	12	70	−58	3	Relegation to 4. divisjon

Source: rsssf.no
Rules for classification: 1) points; 2) goal difference; 3) number of goals scored.
(R) Relegated

=== Group Sørland/Vestland, C ===
Pos	Team	Pld	W	D	L	GF	GA	GD	Pts	Qualification or relegation
1	Os	18	13	3	2	39	14	+25	29	Qualification for the promotion play-offs
2	Djerv (R)	18	9	4	5	32	28	+4	22	Relegation to 3. divisjon
3	Årstad (R)	18	9	3	6	43	22	+21	21	Relegation to 3. divisjon
4	Varegg (R)	18	7	3	8	26	31	−5	17	Relegation to 3. divisjon
5	Trane (R)	18	5	5	8	20	32	−12	15	Relegation to 3. divisjon
6	Fana (R)	18	5	4	9	22	34	−12	14	Relegation to 3. divisjon
7	Nordnes (R)	18	1	6	11	14	35	−21	8	Relegation to 3. divisjon

Source: rsssf.no
Rules for classification: 1) points; 2) goal difference; 3) number of goals scored.
(R) Relegated

=== Group Møre ===
Pos	Team	Pld	W	D	L	GF	GA	GD	Pts	Qualification or relegation
1	Aalesund	21	16	3	2	51	16	+35	35	Qualification for the promotion play-offs
2	Langevåg (R)	21	13	4	4	65	31	+34	30	Relegation to 3. divisjon
3	Hødd (R)	21	13	3	5	66	30	+36	29	Relegation to 3. divisjon
4	Molde (R)	21	8	3	10	42	51	−9	19	Relegation to 3. divisjon
5	Kristiansund (R)	21	8	2	11	39	43	−4	18	Relegation to 3. divisjon
6	Clausenengen (R)	21	6	2	13	34	50	−16	14	Relegation to 3. divisjon
7	Braatt (R)	21	5	4	12	35	64	−29	14	Relegation to 3. divisjon
8	Skarbøvik (R)	21	4	1	16	31	78	−47	9	Relegation to 4. divisjon

Source: rsssf.no
Rules for classification: 1) points; 2) goal difference; 3) number of goals scored.
(R) Relegated

=== Group Trøndelag ===
Pos	Team	Pld	W	D	L	GF	GA	GD	Pts	Qualification or relegation
1	Kvik	21	14	3	4	45	17	+28	31	Qualification for the promotion play-offs
2	Freidig (R)	21	12	3	6	48	30	+18	27	Relegation to 3. divisjon
3	Nessegutten (R)	21	9	6	6	44	35	+9	24	Relegation to 3. divisjon
4	Brage (R)	21	8	7	6	40	34	+6	23	Relegation to 3. divisjon
5	Sverre (R)	21	9	2	10	36	41	−5	20	Relegation to 3. divisjon
6	Falken (R)	21	4	8	9	26	37	−11	16	Relegation to 3. divisjon
7	Ranheim (R)	21	8	0	13	36	52	−16	16	Relegation to 3. divisjon
8	Verdal (R)	21	4	3	14	32	61	−29	11	Relegation to 4. divisjon

Source: rsssf.no
Rules for classification: 1) points; 2) goal difference; 3) number of goals scored.
(R) Relegated

=== Promotion play-off Sørland/Vestland ===
- Haugar - Start 2-0
- Start - Os 2-4
- Os - Haugar 3-2

Pos	Team	Pld	W	D	L	GF	GA	GD	Pts	Qualification
1	Os (O)	2	2	0	0	7	4	+3	4	Qualification for the promotion play-offs final round
2	Haugar	2	1	0	1	4	3	+1	2	Qualification for the 1963 2. divisjon
3	Start	2	0	0	2	2	6	−4	0	Qualification for the 1963 2. divisjon

Source: rsssf.no
Rules for classification: 1) points; 2) goal difference; 3) number of goals scored.
(O) Play-off winners

=== Promotion play-off Møre/Trøndelag ===
- Kvik - Aalesund 0 - 0
- Aalesund - Kvik 2 - 0 (agg. 2 - 0)

Aalesund to promotion play-off

=== Promotion play-off ===
- Sarpsborg - Os 2-0
- Gjøvik/Lyn - Aalesund 1-1
- Os - Sarpsborg 0-3 (agg. 0-5)
- Aalesund- Gjøvik/Lyn 1-2 (agg. 2-3)

Gjøvik/Lyn and Sarpsborg promoted.

=== Relegation play-off ===
- Raufoss - Sparta 4-0
- Sparta - Raufoss 2-2 (agg. 2-6)

Sparta relegated.

== Third division ==
=== District I ===
1. Askim

2. Hafslund
3. Sprint/Jeløy
4. Kvik (Halden)
5. Tune
6. Navestad
7. Gresvik
8. Selbak
9. Tistedalen
10. Borgar

=== District II, group A ===
1. Sagene          		(Play-off)
------
2. Drafn
3. Geithus
4. Vestfossen
5. Raumnes/Årnes
6. Strømsgodset
7. Grue
8. Ski

=== District II, group B ===
1. Åssiden         Play-off
-------
2. Drammens BK
3. Sandaker (*)
4. Slemmestad
5. Kjellmyra
6. Skiold
7. Røa
8. Kongsvinger

(*) Sandaker merged with Aasen to form Sandaker/Aasen

=== District III, group A (Oplandene) ===
1. Kapp            	(Play-off)
----
2. Brumunddal
3. Redalen
4. Fremad
5. Moelven
6. Gjøvik SK
7. Hamar IL
8. Lena

=== District III, group B1 (Sør-Østerdal) ===
1. Nordre Trysil   	(Play-off)
-------------
2. Trysilgutten
3. Nybergsund
4. Ytre Rendal
5. Koppang
6. Elverum
7. Engerdal

=== District III, group B2 (Nord-Østerdal) ===
1. Brekken         (Play-off)
-------
2. Røros
3. Folldal
4. Tynset
5. Nansen
6. Tylldal
7. Haltdalen

=== District III, group B3 (Sør-Gudbrandsdal) ===
1. Kvam            (Play-off)
----
2. Faaberg
3. Fåvang
4. Follebu
5. Ringebu
6. Vinstra

=== District III, group B4 (Nord-Gudbrandsdal) ===
1. Sel             	(Play-off)
---
2. Otta
3. Dovre
4. Faukstad
5. Dombås
6. Heidal
7. Lesjaskog
8. Lesja 		(withdrew)

=== District IV, group A (Vestfold) ===
1. Runar           		(Play-off)
-----
2. Stag
3. Holmestrand
4. Tønsberg Turn
5. Falk
6. Tønsbergkam.
7. Borre
8. Flint

=== District IV, group B (Grenland) ===
1. Skiens-Grane    		(Play-off)
------------
2. Borg
3. Urædd
4. Kragerø
5. Herkules
6. Skiens BK
7. Brevik
8. Storm

=== District IV, group B (Øvre Telemark) ===
1. Snøgg           		(Play-off)
-----
2. Rjukan
3. Ulefoss
4. Skade
5. Gvarv
6. Drangedal
7. Kjapp

=== District V, group A1 (Aust-Agder) ===
1. Arendals BK
-----------
2. Risør
3. Rygene
4. Tvedestrand
5. Dristug
6. Gjerstad 		(withdrew)

=== District V, group A2 (Vest-Agder) ===
1. Donn
----
2. Giv Akt
3. Våg
4. Mandalskam.
5. Lyngdal
6. Torridal

=== District V, group B1 (Rogaland) ===
1. Egersund        		(Play-off)
--------
2. Klepp
3. Vidar
4. Ålgård
5. Varhaug
6. Sola
7. Vaulen
8. Sandnes AIF (Saif)

=== District V, group B2 (Rogaland) ===
1. Djerv 1919      		(Play-off)
----------
2. Nærbø
3. Kopervik
4. Figgjo
5. Åkra
6. Hinna
7. Ganddal
8. Torvastad

=== District V, group C (Sunnhordland) ===
1. Odda            		(Play-off)
----
2. Stord
3. Rubbestadnes
4. Fonna
5. Etne

=== District VI, group A (Bergen) ===
1. Hardy           		(Play-off)
-----
2. Sandviken
3. Laksevåg
4. Baune
5. Fjellkameratene
6. Nymark
7. Bergens-Sparta

=== District VI, group B (Midthordland) ===
1. Arna            		(Play-off)
----
2. Erdal
3. Kjøkkelvik
4. Dale (Dalekvam)
5. Follese
6. Voss
7. Florvåg

=== District VI, group C (Sogn og fjordane) ===
1. Jotun           		(Play-off)
-----
2. Sogndal
3. Sandane
4. Høyang
5. Måløy
6. Eid
7. Dale (Sunnfjord)
8. Florø

=== District VII, group A (Sunnmøre) ===
1. Velled./Ringen  		(Play-off)
--------------
2. Herd
3. Rollon
4. Ørsta
5. Spjelkavik
6. Sykkylven
7. Aksla
8. Volda
9. Stordal

10. Hovdebygda

11. Brattvåg
12. Bergsøy

=== District VII, group B (Romsdal) ===
1. Træff           			(Play-off)
-----
2. Nord-Gossen
3. Eidsvåg (Romsdal)
4. Åndalsnes
5. Harøy
6. Bryn
7. Isfjorden
8. Frode

=== District VII, group C (Nordmøre) ===
1. Dahle           		(Play-off)
-----
2. Søya
3. Sunndal
4. Bjørn
5. Todalen
6. Framtid
7. Bøfjord
8. Nordlandet

=== District VIII, group A (Sør-Trøndelag) ===
1. Orkanger        		(Play-off)
--------
2. Orkdal
3. Løkken
4. Troll
5. Rindal
6. Flå
7. Svorkmo
8. Leik

=== District VIII, group B (Trondheim og omegn) ===
1. Nidelv          			(Play-off)
------
2. Tryggkameratene
3. Heimdal
4. Strinda
5. Trond
6. Vestbyen
7. National
8. Wing

=== District VIII, group C (Fosen) ===
1. Brekstad        			(Play-off)
--------
2. Hasselvika
3. Opphaug
4. Ørland Flystasjon (IØF)
5. Fevåg
6. Beian
7. Bjugn 				(withdrew)

=== District VIII, group D (Nord-Trøndelag/Namdal) ===
1. Stjørdals/Blink 			(Play-off)
---------------
2. Bangsund
3. Fram (Skatval)
4. Neset
5. Vikavarvet
6. Snåsa
7. Namsos
8. Byafossen

=== District IX ===
1. Bodø/Glimt
2. Mo
3. Brønnøysund
4. Stålkameratene
5. Grand
6. Sandnessjøen

=== District X ===
1. Mjølner
2. Andenes
3. Narvik/Nor
4. Tromsø
5. Harstad
6. Svolvær

=== Play-off District II ===
- Sagene - Åssiden 2-0
- Åssiden - Sagene 1-1 (agg. 1-3)

Sagene stay up.

=== Play-off District III ===
- Brekken - Nordre Trysil 3-1

Nordre Trysil relegated.

- Kvam - Sel 10-3

Sel relegated.

- Brekken - Kvam 2-0

Kvam relegated.

- Kapp - Brekken 5-2
- Brekken - Kapp 2–7 (agg. 4-12)

Kapp stay up.

=== Play-off District II/III ===
- Åssiden - Brekken 5-0

Åssiden stay up, Brekken relegated.

=== Play-off District IV ===
- Snøgg - Skiens-Grane 3-1
- Skiens-Grane - Runar 1-4
- Runar - Snøgg 6-1

Pos	Team	Pld	W	D	L	GF	GA	GD	Pts	Relegation
1	Runar	2	2	0	0	10	2	+8	4	
2	Snøgg	2	1	0	1	4	7	−3	2	Relegated
3	Skiens-Grane	2	0	0	2	2	7	−5	0	Relegated

=== Play-off District V ===
- Egersund - Djerv 1919 2-0
- Djerv 1919 - Egersund 3-4 (agg. 3-6)

Egersund stay up.

- Odda - Djerv 1919 2-2
- Djerv 1919 - Odda 3-0 (agg. 5-2)

Djerv 1919 stay up, Odda relegated.

=== Championship District V ===
- Arendals BK - Donn 2-3
- Donn - Arendals BK 3-0 (agg. 6-2)
- Donn - Egersund not played

=== Play-off District VI ===
- Hardy - Arna 1-0

Hardy stay up.

- Arna - Jotun 0-3

Jotun stay up, Arna relegated.

=== Play-off District VII ===
- Velledalen/Ringen - Dahle 0-2
- Træff - Velledalen/Ringen 2-2
- Dahle - Træff 3-3

Pos	Team	Pld	W	D	L	GF	GA	GD	Pts	Relegation
1	Dahle	2	1	1	0	5	3	+2	3	
2	Træff	2	0	2	0	5	5	0	2	
3	Velled./Ringen	2	0	1	1	2	4	−2	1	Relegated

=== Play-off District VIII ===
- Brekstad - Nidelv 0-3
- Stjørdals/Blink - Orkanger 3-0
- Brekstad - Orkanger 1-4
- Nidelv - Stjørdals/Blink 4-1
- Stjørdals/Blink - Brekstad 2-0
- Orkanger - Nidelv 0-2

Pos	Team	Pld	W	D	L	GF	GA	GD	Pts	Relegation
1	Nidelv	3	3	0	0	9	1	+8	6	
2	Stjørdals/Blink	3	2	0	1	6	4	+2	4	
3	Orkanger	3	1	0	2	4	6	−2	2	Relegated
4	Brekstad	3	0	0	3	1	9	−8	0	Relegated

== Norwegian Cup ==
SK Gjøvik-Lyn won their first (and as of 2025, only) cup by defeating SK Vard Haugesund in the cup final, 2-0.

=== Final ===
28 October 1962

Gjøvik-Lyn	2–0	Vard
Backe 20', 62'	Report

Ullevaal Stadion, Oslo
Attendance: 31,157
Referee: Georg Dragvoll (Brage)

== Northern Norwegian Cup ==
=== Final ===
Harstad	2–1	Bodø/Glimt
	Report

== European Cups ==
=== Norwegian representatives ===
- Fredrikstad (Champions Cup)

=== First round ===
- September 5: Fredrikststad - Vasas Budapest (Hungary) 1 - 4
- September 19: Vasas Budapest - Fredrikstad 7 - 0 (agg. 11 - 1)

== National team ==
Date	Venue	Opponent	Res.*	Competition	Norwegian goalscorers
May 16	Oslo	Netherlands	2–1	Friendly	Roald Jensen, Bjørn Borgen
June 11	Copenhagen	Denmark	1–6	NC series	Trygve Andersen
June 21	Oslo	Sweden	0–2	ECQ	
July 3	Trondheim	Malta	5–0	Friendly	Arne Pedersen, John Krogh, Olav Nilsen (3)
July 9	Reykjavík	Iceland	3–1	Friendly	Arne Pedersen, Olav Nilsen (2)
August 26	Bergen	Finland	2–1	NC Series	Ragnar Nikolai Larsen, Olav Nilsen
September 16	Oslo	Sweden	2–1	NC Series	Roald Jensen, Erik Johansen
November 4	Malmö	Sweden	1–1	ECQ	John Krogh

Note: Norway's goals first
Explanation:

- ECQ = European Championship Qualifier
