= 1952 in Norwegian football =

Football in Norway
Men's football
- Hovedserien: Fredrikstad
- Landsdelsserien: Larvik Turn (Group East/South); Lillestrøm (Group East/North); Flekkefjord (Group South/West A1); Ålgård (Group South/West A2); Varegg (Group South/West B); Hødd (Group Møre); Ranheim (Group Trøndelag)
- NM: Sparta

Results from Norwegian football in 1952.

== 1951–52 league season ==
=== Hovedserien ===
==== Group A ====
Pos	Team	Pld	W	D	L	GF	GA	GD	Pts	Qualification or relegation
1	Brann	14	8	1	5	27	21	+6	17	Qualification for the championship final
2	Skeid	14	6	3	5	33	19	+14	15	
3	Odd	14	7	1	6	30	23	+7	15	
4	Viking	14	5	5	4	21	19	+2	15	
5	Asker	14	6	2	6	27	23	+4	14	
6	Årstad	14	5	4	5	22	35	−13	14	
7	Vålerengen (R)	14	5	3	6	25	22	+3	13	Relegation
8	Ørn (R)	14	2	5	7	21	44	−23	9	Relegation

Source: RSSSF
(R) Relegated

==== Group B ====
Pos	Team	Pld	W	D	L	GF	GA	GD	Pts	Qualification or relegation
1	Fredrikstad (C)	14	12	2	0	41	16	+25	26	Qualification for the championship final
2	Sarpsborg	14	8	1	5	22	15	+7	17	
3	Sparta	14	5	4	5	18	18	0	14	
4	Lyn	14	5	4	5	19	20	−1	14	
5	Sandefjord	14	5	3	6	16	19	−3	13	
6	Strømmen	14	5	2	7	25	23	+2	12	
7	Kvik (Trondheim) (R)	14	5	2	7	23	25	−2	12	Relegation
8	Snøgg (R)	14	0	4	10	9	37	−28	4	Relegation

Source: RSSSF
(C) Champions; (R) Relegated

==== Championship final ====
June 22: Fredrikstad - Brann 3-1

=== Landsdelsserien ===
==== Group Østland/Søndre ====
Pos	Team	Pld	W	D	L	GF	GA	GD	Pts	Promotion or relegation
1	Larvik Turn (P)	14	12	1	1	47	8	+39	25	Promotion to Hovedserien
2	Pors	14	10	1	3	31	17	+14	21	
3	Fram	14	7	2	5	19	14	+5	16	
4	Lisleby	14	7	2	5	27	23	+4	16	
5	Selbak	14	6	2	6	14	18	−4	14	
6	Eik (R)	14	4	3	7	17	25	−8	11	Relegation to 3. divisjon
7	Kvik Halden (R)	14	2	2	10	4	21	−17	6	Relegation to 3. divisjon
8	Stag (R)	14	1	1	12	9	42	−33	3	Relegation to 3. divisjon

Source: rsssf.no
Rules for classification: 1) points; 2) goal difference; 3) number of goals scored.
(P) Promoted; (R) Relegated

==== Group Østland/Nordre ====
Pos	Team	Pld	W	D	L	GF	GA	GD	Pts	Promotion or relegation
1	Lillestrøm (P)	14	9	4	1	31	15	+16	22	Promotion to Hovedserien
2	Frigg	14	6	5	3	26	17	+9	17	
3	Kapp	14	6	5	3	29	21	+8	17	
4	Solberg	14	5	5	4	20	18	+2	15	
5	Drafn	14	5	3	6	20	26	−6	13	
6	Geithus	14	5	2	7	16	22	−6	12	
7	Sandaker (R)	14	3	3	8	19	29	−10	9	Relegation to 3. divisjon
8	Gjøvik-Lyn (R)	14	1	5	8	14	27	−13	7	Relegation to 3. divisjon

Source: rsssf.no
Rules for classification: 1) points; 2) goal difference; 3) number of goals scored.
(P) Promoted; (R) Relegated

==== Group Sørland/Vestland, A1 ====
Pos	Team	Pld	W	D	L	GF	GA	GD	Pts	Qualification or relegation
1	Flekkefjord	12	9	1	2	38	11	+27	19	Qualification for the promotion play-offs
2	Jerv	12	7	3	2	25	17	+8	17	
3	Start	12	5	4	3	25	17	+8	14	
4	Donn	12	5	3	4	26	20	+6	13	
5	Sørfjell	12	5	0	7	22	32	−10	10	
6	Mandalskameratene	12	3	4	5	19	33	−14	10	
7	Grane (R)	12	0	1	11	9	34	−25	1	Relegation to 3. divisjon

Source: rsssf.no
Rules for classification: 1) points; 2) goal difference; 3) number of goals scored.
(R) Relegated

==== Group Sørland/Vestland, A2 ====
Pos	Team	Pld	W	D	L	GF	GA	GD	Pts	Qualification or relegation
1	Ålgård	14	9	3	2	29	11	+18	21	Qualification for the promotion play-offs
2	Djerv 1919	14	8	2	4	32	16	+16	18	
3	Vard	14	8	0	6	26	22	+4	16	
4	Nærbø	14	6	3	5	25	19	+6	15	
5	Bryne	14	6	2	6	24	23	+1	14	
6	Ulf	14	4	5	5	14	20	−6	13	
7	Jarl (R)	14	2	5	7	17	27	−10	9	Relegation to 3. divisjon
8	Randaberg (R)	14	2	2	10	10	39	−29	6	Relegation to 3. divisjon

Source: rsssf.no
Rules for classification: 1) points; 2) goal difference; 3) number of goals scored.
(R) Relegated

==== Group Sørland/Vestland B ====
Pos	Team	Pld	W	D	L	GF	GA	GD	Pts	Qualification or relegation
1	Varegg (O, P)	12	8	1	3	41	18	+23	17	Qualification for the promotion play-offs
2	Os	12	8	1	3	34	21	+13	17	
3	Djerv	12	7	0	5	23	19	+4	14	
4	Nordnes	12	5	2	5	21	18	+3	12	
5	Nymark	12	5	1	6	21	25	−4	11	
6	Baune	12	4	0	8	22	29	−7	8	
7	Hardy	12	2	1	9	8	40	−32	5	

Source: rsssf.no
Rules for classification: 1) points; 2) goal difference; 3) number of goals scored.
(O) Play-off winners; (P) Promoted

==== Group Møre ====
Pos	Team	Pld	W	D	L	GF	GA	GD	Pts	Qualification or relegation
1	Hødd	14	7	4	3	36	28	+8	18	Qualification for the promotion play-offs
2	Aalesund	14	8	2	4	20	14	+6	18	
3	Langevåg	14	7	3	4	33	25	+8	17	
4	Kristiansund	14	6	2	6	39	41	−2	14	
5	Clausenengen	14	4	4	6	26	36	−10	12	
6	Molde	14	5	1	8	23	20	+3	11	
7	Braatt (R)	14	2	7	5	23	28	−5	11	Relegation to 3. divisjon
8	Rollon (R)	14	4	3	7	22	30	−8	11	Relegation to 3. divisjon

Source: rsssf.no
Rules for classification: 1) points; 2) goal difference; 3) number of goals scored.
(R) Relegated

==== Group Trøndelag ====
Pos	Team	Pld	W	D	L	GF	GA	GD	Pts	Qualification or relegation
1	Ranheim (O, P)	14	10	3	1	29	12	+17	23	Qualification for the promotion play-offs
2	Freidig	14	10	2	2	24	10	+14	22	
3	Falken	14	9	1	4	21	11	+10	19	
4	Steinkjer	14	5	4	5	27	23	+4	14	
5	Neset	14	5	2	7	28	30	−2	12	
6	Brage	14	5	2	7	25	28	−3	12	
7	Wing (R)	14	1	4	9	9	21	−12	6	Relegation to 3. divisjon
8	Rosenborg (R)	14	1	2	11	14	42	−28	4	Relegation to 3. divisjon

Source: rsssf.no
Rules for classification: 1) points; 2) goal difference; 3) number of goals scored.
(O) Play-off winners; (P) Promoted; (R) Relegated

==== Promotion play-offs ====
===== Sørland/Vestland =====
Ålgård - Flekkefjord 2-0

Varegg - Ålgård 2-2 (extra time)

Varegg - Ålgård 2-1

Varegg promoted.

===== Møre/Trøndelag =====
Ranheim - Hødd 2-0

Ranheim promoted.

=== First Division ===
==== District I ====
1. Moss (Promoted)
2. Greåker
3. Sprint
4. Rakkestad
5. Asim
6. Rapid
7. Borgen
8. Tistedalen

==== District II, Group A ====
1. Jevnaker (Play-off)
2. Aurskog
3. Nydalen
4. Bjørkelangen
5. Saene
6. Mercantile/Trygg
7. Akdemisk
8. Bækkelaget

==== District II, Group B ====
1. Drammens BK (Play-off)
2. Kongsberg
3. Kjelsås
4. Mjøndalen
5. Aaen
6. Grei
7. Strong
8. Jordal

==== District III ====
1. Hamarkameratene (Play-off)
2. Raufoss
3. Hamar IL
4. Vang
5. Fremad
6. Mesna
7. Brumunddal
8. Bøverbru

==== District IV, Group A ====
1. Herkules (Play-off)
2. Storm
3. Urædd
4. Tønsberg Turn
5. Flint
6. Falk
7. Tollnes
8. Holmestrand

==== District IV, group B ====
1. Skiens BK Play-off
2. Rjukan
3. Borg
4. Brevik
5. Skiens-Grane
6. Ulefoss
7. Sp.klubben 31
8. Langesund

==== District V, Group A1 (Aust-Agder) ====
1. Trauma (Play-off)
2. Arendals BK
3. Risør
4. Nedenes
5. Nidarås
6. Tvedestrand

==== District V, Group A2 (Aust-Agder) ====
1. Vindbjart (Play-off)
2. AIK Lund
3. Bakke
4. Vigør
5. Farsund
6. Torridal

==== District V, Group B1 (Rogaland) ====
1. Klepp (Promoted)
2. Varhaug
3. Brodd
4. Orre
5. Pol
6. Ganddal

==== District V, B2 (Rogaland) ====
1. Stavanger IF (Promoted)
2. Haugar
3. Buøy
4. Vidar
5. Kopervik
6. Staal

==== District VI, Group A (Bergen) ====
1. Fjellkameratene (Play-off)
2. Laksevåg
3. Minde
4. Bergens-Sparta
5. Trane
6. Frøya
7. Viggo

==== District VI, Group B (Midthordland) ====
1. Voss (Play-off)
2. Florvåg
3. Dale (Dalekvam)
4. Fana
5. Erdal

==== District VII, Group A (Sunnmøre/Romsdal) ====
1. Ørsta (Promoted)
2. Spjelkavik
3. Skarbøvik
4. Veblungsnes
5. Volda
6. Åndalsnes
7. Aksla
8. Hareid

==== District VII, Group B (Nordmøre/Romsdal) ====
1. Træff (Promoted)
2. Nordlandet
3. Averøykam.
4. Halsa
5. Goma
6. Sunndal
7. Bjørn
8. Rensvik

==== District VIII, Group A (Sør-Trøndelag) ====
1. Løkken (Play-off)
2. Melhus
3. Svorkmo
4. Troll
5. Orkanger
6. Heimdal
7. Oppdal

==== District VIII, Group B (Trondheim og omegn) ====
1. National (Play-off)
2. Nidar
3. Tryggkameratene
4. Ørn (Trondheim)
5. Trond
6. Tempe
7. Vestbyen
8. Strindheim

==== District VIII, Group C (Fosen) ====
1. Opphaug (Play-off)
2. Beian
3. Lensvik
4. Uthaug
5. Stadsbygd
6. Fevåg
7. Brekstad

==== District VIII, Group D (Nord-Trøndelag) ====
1. Nessegutten (Play-off)
2. Sverre
3. Stjørdal
4. Verdal
5. Malm
6. Blink
7. Frostakameratene

==== Play-off, District II/III ====
Jevnaker - Drammens BK 2-1

Drammens BK - Hamarkameratene 0-1

Hamarkameratene - Jevnaker 3-4

==== Table ====
Pos	Team	Pld	W	D	L	GF	GA	GD	Pts	Promotion
1	Jevnaker	2	2	0	0	6	4	+2	4	Promoted
2	Hamarkameratene	2	1	0	1	4	4	0	2	Promoted
3	Drammens BK	2	0	0	2	1	3	−2	0	

==== Championship District II ====
Jevnaker - Drammens BK 2-1

Drammens BK - Jevnaker 0-2 (agg. 1-4)

==== Play-off District IV ====
Herkules - Skiens BK 2-0

Herkules promoted.

==== Relegation play-off District IV ====
Falk - Ulefoss 1-1 (extra time)

Falk - Ulefoss 0-1 (in Porsgrunn)

Falk relegated

==== Play-off District V ====
Trauma - Vindbjart 4-0

Vindbjart - Trauma 1-1 (agg. 1-5)

Trauma promoted.

==== Championship District V ====
Stavanger IF - Klepp 5–1

Klepp - Stavanger IF 0-3 (agg. 1-8)

Trauma - Stavanger IF 0-2 (in Flekkefjord)

==== Play-off District VI ====
Fjellkameratene - Voss 1-2

Voss - Fjellkameratene 3-2 (agg. 5-3)

Voss promoted.

==== Championship District VII ====
Ørsta - Træff 6-1 (in Ålesund)

==== Play-off District VIII ====
Løkken - Opphaug 7-2

Nessegutten - Løkken 5-3

Opphaug - National 0-6

National - Nessegutten 1-3

National - Løkken 1-0

Nessegutten - Opphaug 10-2

==== Table ====
Pos	Team	Pld	W	D	L	GF	GA	GD	Pts	Promotion
1	Nessegutten	3	3	0	0	18	6	+12	6	Promoted
2	National	3	2	0	1	8	3	+5	4	Promoted
3	Løkken	3	1	0	2	10	8	+2	2	
4	Opphaug	3	0	0	3	4	23	−19	0	

== Norwegian Cup ==
=== Final ===
26 October 1952

Sparta	3–2	Solberg
K. Sørensen 78' (pen.), 84'; O. Sørensen 89'	Report	Pedersen 10' (o.g.); Svendsen 34' (o.g.)

Ullevaal Stadion, Oslo
Attendance: 30,639
Referee: Helge Ladim (Grüner)

== Northern Norwegian Cup ==
=== Final ===
Bodø/Glimt	2–1	Tromsø
	Report

== National team ==
Date	Venue	Opponent	Res.*	Competition	Norwegian goalscorers
June 10	Oslo	Finland	1–2	Friendly	Henry Johannessen
June 25	Zagreb	Yugoslavia	1–4	Friendly	Jan Sagvaag
July 21	Tampere	Sweden	1–4	OG 1/8 final	Odd Wang Sørensen
August 31	Oslo	Finland	7–2	Friendly	Kjell Kristiansen (3), Gunnar Thoresen (2), Odd Wang Sørensen (2)
October 5	Oslo	Sweden	1–2	Friendly	Henry Johannessen
October 19	Copenhagen	Denmark	3–1	Friendly	Tor Jevne, Odd Wang Sørensen, Hans Nordahl

Note: Norway's goals first
Explanation:

- OG = 1952 Summer Olympics
