= 1951–52 Landsdelsserien =

Landsdelsserien
- Season: 1951–52
- Promoted: Larvik Turn; Lillestrøm; Varegg; Ranheim
- Relegated: Eik; Kvik Halden; Stag; Sandaker; Gjøvik-Lyn; Grane; Jarl; Randaberg; Braatt; Rollon; Wing; Rosenborg

The 1951–52 Landsdelsserien was a Norwegian second-tier football league season, the first named Landsdelsserien.

The league was contested by 54 teams, divided into a total of seven groups from four districts; Østland/Søndre, Østland/Nordre, Sørland/Vestland and Møre/Trøndelag. The two group winners in the Østland districts, Larvik Turn and Lillestrøm promoted directly to the 1952–53 Hovedserien. The other five group winners qualified for promotion play-offs to compete for two spots in the following season's top flight. Varegg and Ranheim won the play-offs and were promoted.

== Tables ==
=== District Østland/Søndre ===
Pos	Team	Pld	W	D	L	GF	GA	GD	Pts	Promotion or relegation
1	Larvik Turn (P)	14	12	1	1	47	8	+39	25	Promotion to Hovedserien
2	Pors	14	10	1	3	31	17	+14	21	
3	Fram	14	7	2	5	19	14	+5	16	
4	Lisleby	14	7	2	5	27	23	+4	16	
5	Selbak	14	6	2	6	14	18	−4	14	
6	Eik (R)	14	4	3	7	17	25	−8	11	Relegation to 3. divisjon
7	Kvik Halden (R)	14	2	2	10	4	21	−17	6	Relegation to 3. divisjon
8	Stag (R)	14	1	1	12	9	42	−33	3	Relegation to 3. divisjon

Source: rsssf.no
Rules for classification: 1) points; 2) goal difference; 3) number of goals scored.
(P) Promoted; (R) Relegated

=== District Østland/Nordre ===
Pos	Team	Pld	W	D	L	GF	GA	GD	Pts	Promotion or relegation
1	Lillestrøm (P)	14	9	4	1	31	15	+16	22	Promotion to Hovedserien
2	Frigg	14	6	5	3	26	17	+9	17	
3	Kapp	14	6	5	3	29	21	+8	17	
4	Solberg	14	5	5	4	20	18	+2	15	
5	Drafn	14	5	3	6	20	26	−6	13	
6	Geithus	14	5	2	7	16	22	−6	12	
7	Sandaker (R)	14	3	3	8	19	29	−10	9	Relegation to 3. divisjon
8	Gjøvik-Lyn (R)	14	1	5	8	14	27	−13	7	Relegation to 3. divisjon

Source: rsssf.no
Rules for classification: 1) points; 2) goal difference; 3) number of goals scored.
(P) Promoted; (R) Relegated

=== District Sørland/Vestland ===
==== Group A1 ====
Pos	Team	Pld	W	D	L	GF	GA	GD	Pts	Qualification or relegation
1	Flekkefjord	12	9	1	2	38	11	+27	19	Qualification for the promotion play-offs
2	Jerv	12	7	3	2	25	17	+8	17	
3	Start	12	5	4	3	25	17	+8	14	
4	Donn	12	5	3	4	26	20	+6	13	
5	Sørfjell	12	5	0	7	22	32	−10	10	
6	Mandalskameratene	12	3	4	5	19	33	−14	10	
7	Grane (R)	12	0	1	11	9	34	−25	1	Relegation to 3. divisjon

Source: rsssf.no
Rules for classification: 1) points; 2) goal difference; 3) number of goals scored.
(R) Relegated

==== Group A2 ====
Pos	Team	Pld	W	D	L	GF	GA	GD	Pts	Qualification or relegation
1	Ålgård	14	9	3	2	29	11	+18	21	Qualification for the promotion play-offs
2	Djerv 1919	14	8	2	4	32	16	+16	18	
3	Vard	14	8	0	6	26	22	+4	16	
4	Nærbø	14	6	3	5	25	19	+6	15	
5	Bryne	14	6	2	6	24	23	+1	14	
6	Ulf	14	4	5	5	14	20	−6	13	
7	Jarl (R)	14	2	5	7	17	27	−10	9	Relegation to 3. divisjon
8	Randaberg (R)	14	2	2	10	10	39	−29	6	Relegation to 3. divisjon

Source: rsssf.no
Rules for classification: 1) points; 2) goal difference; 3) number of goals scored.
(R) Relegated

==== Group B ====
Pos	Team	Pld	W	D	L	GF	GA	GD	Pts	Qualification or relegation
1	Varegg (O, P)	12	8	1	3	41	18	+23	17	Qualification for the promotion play-offs
2	Os	12	8	1	3	34	21	+13	17	
3	Djerv	12	7	0	5	23	19	+4	14	
4	Nordnes	12	5	2	5	21	18	+3	12	
5	Nymark	12	5	1	6	21	25	−4	11	
6	Baune	12	4	0	8	22	29	−7	8	
7	Hardy	12	2	1	9	8	40	−32	5	

Source: rsssf.no
Rules for classification: 1) points; 2) goal difference; 3) number of goals scored.
(O) Play-off winners; (P) Promoted

=== District Møre/Trøndelag ===
==== Møre ====
Pos	Team	Pld	W	D	L	GF	GA	GD	Pts	Qualification or relegation
1	Hødd	14	7	4	3	36	28	+8	18	Qualification for the promotion play-offs
2	Aalesund	14	8	2	4	20	14	+6	18	
3	Langevåg	14	7	3	4	33	25	+8	17	
4	Kristiansund	14	6	2	6	39	41	−2	14	
5	Clausenengen	14	4	4	6	26	36	−10	12	
6	Molde	14	5	1	8	23	20	+3	11	
7	Braatt (R)	14	2	7	5	23	28	−5	11	Relegation to 3. divisjon
8	Rollon (R)	14	4	3	7	22	30	−8	11	Relegation to 3. divisjon

Source: rsssf.no
Rules for classification: 1) points; 2) goal difference; 3) number of goals scored.
(R) Relegated

==== Trøndelag ====
Pos	Team	Pld	W	D	L	GF	GA	GD	Pts	Qualification or relegation
1	Ranheim (O, P)	14	10	3	1	29	12	+17	23	Qualification for the promotion play-offs
2	Freidig	14	10	2	2	24	10	+14	22	
3	Falken	14	9	1	4	21	11	+10	19	
4	Steinkjer	14	5	4	5	27	23	+4	14	
5	Neset	14	5	2	7	28	30	−2	12	
6	Brage	14	5	2	7	25	28	−3	12	
7	Wing (R)	14	1	4	9	9	21	−12	6	Relegation to 3. divisjon
8	Rosenborg (R)	14	1	2	11	14	42	−28	4	Relegation to 3. divisjon

Source: rsssf.no
Rules for classification: 1) points; 2) goal difference; 3) number of goals scored.
(O) Play-off winners; (P) Promoted; (R) Relegated

== Promotion play-offs ==
Sørland/Vestland
Results A1–A2

- Ålgård 2–0 Flekkefjord

Results A–B

- Varegg 2–2 (a.e.t.) Ålgård
- Varegg 2–1 Ålgård

Varegg won 2–1 over Ålgård and were promoted to Hovedserien.

Møre/Trøndelag

- Ranheim 2–0 Hødd

Ranheim won 2–0 over Hødd and were promoted to Hovedserien.
