= Landsdelsserien =

Norwegian football league

- Organising body: Norwegian Football Federation
- Founded: 1951
- Folded: 1962
- Country: Norway
- Number of clubs: 54 (1951–1961); 55 (1961–1962)
- Level on pyramid: 2
- Promotion to: Hovedserien
- Relegation to: 3. divisjon
- Domestic cup(s): Norwegian Cup
- International cup(s): European Cup Winners' Cup (1960–1962)

Landsdelsserien is a former division in Norwegian football and from 1951 to 1962, it was the second tier division in the Norwegian football league system. Following the creation of the new 1. divisjon in 1963, the division folded and its district groups were replaced by national groups in the new second tier; 2. divisjon.

== History ==
Landsdelsserien consisted of seven district groups of seven or eight team in each group. The two winners of the groups from Eastern Norway were promoted directly to the following season's top division, at the time named Hovedserien (English: The Main League). The remaining five winner qualified for promotion play-offs to compete for two spots in the following season's top division. In the 1961–62 season, only two teams promoted. Teams from Northern Norway did not participate in the national league system until 1972 and thus did not participate in Landsdelsserien.

=== Competition format ===
From	To	Group(s)	Teams	Match-weeks	Season Start	Season End	Dir. promoted	Promotion play-off spots
1951–52	1960–61	7	54	12–14	Autumn	Spring	2	5
1961–62		7	55	18–21	Autumn	Spring	2	5

== Landsdelsserien winners ==
Winners from districts east/south and east/north were promoted to the top division. The remaining five winner qualified for promotion play-offs to compete for two spots in the following season's top division. In the 1961–62 season, only two teams promoted. Promoted teams are shown in bold.

Season	East/South	East/North	West/South A	West/South B	West/South C	Møre	Trøndelag
1951–52	Larvik Turn	Lillestrøm	Flekkefjord	Ålgård	**Varegg**	Hødd	**Ranheim**
1952–53	Moss	Geithus	Flekkefjord	Djerv 1919	**Nordnes**	Langevåg	**Freidig**
1953–54	Fram (Larvik)	Vålerengen	Flekkefjord	Bryne	**Brann**	Molde	**Ranheim**
1954–55	Rapid	Frigg	Jerv	Bryne	**Varegg**	Kristiansund	**Kvik**
1955–56	Sparta	Strømmen	Start	Ulf	**Årstad**	Molde	**Steinkjer**
1956–57	Eik	Raufoss	Donn	Stavanger	**Brann**	**Molde**	Sverre
1957–58	Greåker	Kapp	Jerv	Stavanger	**Årstad**	Kristiansund	**Freidig**
1958–59	Rapid	Vålerengen	**Start**	Bryne	Os	Hødd	**Brage**
1959–60	Lisleby	Lyn	Vindbjart	**Stavanger**	Årstad	Kristiansund	**Rosenborg**
1960–61	Ørn	Frigg	Start	Ulf	**Brann**	Langevåg	**Steinkjer**
1961–62	Sarpsborg	Gjøvik-Lyn	Start	Haugar	Os	Aalesund	Kvik
