= 1959–60 Landsdelsserien =

Landsdelsserien
- Season: 1959–60
- Promoted: Lisleby; Lyn; Stavanger; Rosenborg
- Relegated: Snøgg; Sagene; Kapp; Grane; Donn; Kopervik; Sandviken; Nymark; Skarbøvik; Clausenengen; Ranheim; Neset

The 1959–60 Landsdelsserien was a Norwegian second-tier football league season.

The league was contested by 54 teams, divided into a total of seven groups from four districts; Østland/Søndre, Østland/Nordre, Sørland/Vestre and Møre/Trøndelag. The two group winners in the Østland districts, Ørn and Frigg promoted directly to the 1960–61 Hovedserien. The other five group winners qualified for promotion play-offs to compete for two spots in the following season's top flight. Stavanger and Rosenborg won the play-offs and were promoted.

== Tables ==
=== District Østland/Søndre ===
Pos	Team	Pld	W	D	L	GF	GA	GD	Pts	Promotion or relegation
1	Lisleby (P)	14	10	2	2	32	13	+19	22	Promotion to Hovedserien
2	Sarpsborg	14	9	4	1	31	12	+19	22	
3	Moss	14	7	4	3	26	17	+9	18	
4	Fram	14	7	2	5	24	25	−1	16	
5	Pors	14	4	6	4	26	21	+5	14	
6	Selbak	14	5	2	7	20	23	−3	12	
7	Sparta	14	1	3	10	19	37	−18	5	
8	Snøgg (R)	14	1	1	12	14	44	−30	3	Relegation to 3. divisjon

Source: rsssf.no
Rules for classification: 1) points; 2) goal difference; 3) number of goals scored.
(P) Promoted; (R) Relegated

=== District Østland/Nordre ===
Pos	Team	Pld	W	D	L	GF	GA	GD	Pts	Promotion or relegation
1	Lyn (P)	14	9	2	3	36	25	+11	20	Promotion to Hovedserien
2	Mjøndalen	14	7	4	3	37	27	+10	18	
3	Gjøvik-Lyn	14	7	3	4	32	24	+8	17	
4	Asker	14	8	0	6	36	23	+13	16	
5	Sandaker	14	6	3	5	25	25	0	15	
6	Frigg	14	6	2	6	38	29	+9	14	
7	Sagene (R)	14	2	2	10	19	44	−25	6	Relegation to 3. divisjon
8	Kapp (R)	14	2	2	10	21	47	−26	6	Relegation to 3. divisjon

Source: rsssf.no
Rules for classification: 1) points; 2) goal difference; 3) number of goals scored.
(P) Promoted; (R) Relegated

=== District Sørland/Vestland ===
==== Group A ====
Pos	Team	Pld	W	D	L	GF	GA	GD	Pts	Qualification or relegation
1	Vindbjart	12	8	1	3	27	15	+12	17	Qualification for the promotion play-offs
2	Sørfjell	12	7	2	3	25	13	+12	16	
3	Jerv	12	6	2	4	33	22	+11	14	
4	Flekkefjord	12	6	1	5	22	18	+4	13	
5	Nedenes	12	5	1	6	17	35	−18	11	
6	Grane (R)	12	3	1	8	18	26	−8	7	Relegation to 3. divisjon
7	Donn (R)	12	3	0	9	19	32	−13	6	Relegation to 3. divisjon

Source: rsssf.no
Rules for classification: 1) points; 2) goal difference; 3) number of goals scored.
(R) Relegated

==== Group B ====
Pos	Team	Pld	W	D	L	GF	GA	GD	Pts	Qualification or relegation
1	Stavanger (O, P)	14	10	2	2	40	19	+21	22	Qualification for the promotion play-offs
2	Vard	14	9	2	3	30	16	+14	20	
3	Haugar	14	6	3	5	28	22	+6	15	
4	Djerv 1919	14	6	1	7	22	20	+2	13	
5	Vidar	14	6	1	7	25	31	−6	13	
6	Bryne	14	6	1	7	23	33	−10	13	
7	Egersund	14	5	2	7	22	24	−2	12	
8	Kopervik (R)	14	1	2	11	17	42	−25	4	Relegation to 3. divisjon

Source: rsssf.no
Rules for classification: 1) points; 2) goal difference; 3) number of goals scored.
(O) Play-off winners; (P) Promoted; (R) Relegated

==== Group C ====
Pos	Team	Pld	W	D	L	GF	GA	GD	Pts	Qualification or relegation
1	Årstad	12	8	3	1	26	11	+15	19	Qualification for the promotion play-offs
2	Os	12	7	2	3	36	21	+15	16	
3	Fana	12	5	3	4	24	18	+6	13	
4	Varegg	12	4	4	4	23	23	0	12	
5	Nordnes	12	3	4	5	10	14	−4	10	
6	Sandviken (R)	12	4	1	7	18	31	−13	9	Relegation to 3. divisjon
7	Nymark (R)	12	2	1	9	8	27	−19	5	Relegation to 3. divisjon

Source: rsssf.no
Rules for classification: 1) points; 2) goal difference; 3) number of goals scored.
(R) Relegated

=== District Møre/Trøndelag ===
==== Møre ====
Pos	Team	Pld	W	D	L	GF	GA	GD	Pts	Qualification or relegation
1	Kristiansund	14	9	3	2	37	18	+19	21	Qualification for the promotion play-offs
2	Hødd	14	10	1	3	36	19	+17	21	
3	Aalesund	14	7	4	3	24	20	+4	18	
4	Braatt	14	7	3	4	34	29	+5	17	
5	Langevåg	14	5	2	7	26	30	−4	12	
6	Molde	14	4	2	8	26	28	−2	10	
7	Skarbøvik (R)	14	3	2	9	29	38	−9	8	Relegation to 3. divisjon
8	Clausenengen (R)	14	2	1	11	12	42	−30	5	Relegation to 3. divisjon

Source: rsssf.no
Rules for classification: 1) points; 2) goal difference; 3) number of goals scored.
(R) Relegated

==== Trøndelag ====
Pos	Team	Pld	W	D	L	GF	GA	GD	Pts	Qualification or relegation
1	Rosenborg (O, P)	14	10	1	3	43	15	+28	21	Qualification for the promotion play-offs
2	Kvik	14	8	4	2	31	19	+12	20	
3	Freidig	14	8	1	5	37	31	+6	17	
4	Steinkjer	14	5	6	3	39	27	+12	16	
5	Nessegutten	14	7	2	5	25	17	+8	16	
6	Sverre	14	5	5	4	28	32	−4	15	
7	Ranheim (R)	14	1	3	10	20	44	−24	5	Relegation to 3. divisjon
8	Neset (R)	14	0	2	12	9	47	−38	2	Relegation to 3. divisjon

Source: rsssf.no
Rules for classification: 1) points; 2) goal difference; 3) number of goals scored.
(O) Play-off winners; (P) Promoted; (R) Relegated

== Promotion play-offs ==
Sørland/Vestland
Results

- Vindbjart 1–1 Stavanger
- Årstad 2–2 Vindbjart
- Stavanger 1–3 Årstad

Pos	Team	Pld	W	D	L	GF	GA	GD	Pts	Qualification
1	Stavanger (O, P)	2	2	0	0	7	4	+3	4	Promotion to Hovedserien
2	Årstad	2	1	0	1	7	6	+1	2	Remained in Landsdelsserien
3	Vindbjart	2	0	0	2	4	8	−4	0	Remained in Landsdelsserien

Source: rsssf.no
Rules for classification: 1) points; 2) goal difference; 3) number of goals scored.
(O) Play-off winners; (P) Promoted

Møre/Trøndelag

- Rosenborg 4–0 Kristiansund
- Kristiansund 0–5 Rosenborg

Rosenborg won 9–0 on aggregate and were promoted to Hovedserien.
