= List of Molde FK records and statistics =

Molde FK is a Norwegian professional football club based in Molde, Møre og Romsdal. The club was founded as International in 1911. The club changed its name to Molde in 1915. Molde FK currently play in the Eliteserien, the top tier of Norwegian football. They have not been out of the top tier since 2007. They have been involved in European football several times since their first time in 1975. In 1999 Molde became the second Norwegian club to enter the UEFA Champions League.

This list encompasses the major honours won by Molde FK and records set by the club, their managers and their players. The player records section includes details of the club's leading goalscorers and those who have made most appearances in first-team competitions. It also records club's attendance records, both at Molde Idrettspark, their home until 1997 season, and Aker Stadion, their home from 1998 and forward.

The club's record appearance maker is Daniel Berg Hestad, who made 666 competitive appearances between 1993 and 2016, and the club's record goalscorer is Jan Fuglset, who scored 164 goals between 1963 and 1982.

== Honours ==
Molde FK's first major trophy was the 1994 Norwegian Football Cup where Lyn were beaten 3–2 in the final. Their most recent trophy came in December 2023, when they won the Norwegian Cup for the sixth time.

=== Domestic ===
==== League ====
Norwegian Top Flight: 5

- Tippeligaen/Eliteserien (Level 1): 5
  - 2011, 2012, 2014, 2019, 2022

2. divisjon/1. divisjon (Level 2): 3

- 2. divisjon (Level 2): 2
  - 1973, 1983
- 1. divisjon (Level 2): 1
  - 2007

==== Cup ====
- Norwegian Football Cup: 6
  - 1994, 2005, 2013, 2014, 2021, 2023

=== European performances ===
- UEFA Champions League Group Stage: 1
  - 1999–2000
- UEFA Europa League Group Stage: 4
  - 2012–13 (GS), 2015–16 (round of 32), 2020–21 (round of 16), 2023–24 (GS)
- UEFA Europa Conference League Group Stage: 1
  - 2022–23 (GS)

== Players ==
All current players are bolded.

=== Appearances ===
- Youngest first-team player: Sander Svendsen – 15 years, 275 days (against Aalesund, Tippeligaen, 8 May 2013)
- Oldest first-team player: Daniel Berg Hestad – 40 years, 215 days (against Sevilla, Europa League, 25 February 2016)
- Most consecutive League appearances: **139** – Morten Bakke, 12,510 minutes between 9 May 1996 – 8 July 2001

==== Most overall appearances ====
As of match played 9 December 2022. Competitive matches only.

Key
§	A minimum number due to lack of information

	Name	Years	League	Cup	Europe	Other (Note: Includes other competitive competitions, including the Eliteserien play-offs, Norwegian Super Cup, Royal League)	Total
1	(Norway) Daniel Berg Hestad	1993–2002; 2005–2016	516	81	66	3 (Note: Appearance(s) in Eliteserien Promotion/relegation play-offs)	**666**
2	(Norway) Stein Olav Hestad	1971–1989	317 §	34 §	6	4 (Note: Appearances in promotion play-offs)	**361** §
3	(Norway) Vegard Forren	2007–2012; 2013–2016; 2017–2019	293	39	52	0	**384**
4	(Sweden) Mattias Moström	2007–2020	290	35	43	0	**365**
5	(Norway) Magne Hoseth	1998–2004; 2006–2014	284	47	33	0	**364**
6	(Norway) Ulrich Møller	1980–1994	302 §	43 §	2	2	**349** §
7	(Norway) Trond Strande	1991–2007	275	33 §	18	2	**328** §
8	(Norway) Morten Bakke	1991–2001	260	37 §	20	0	**317** §
9	(Norway) **Magnus Wolff Eikrem**	2011–2013; 2018–present	212	22	63	0	**297**
10	(Pakistan) Etzaz Hussain	2012–2015; 2017–2022	202	29	63	0	**294**

=== Most appearances in the top flight ===
The following is a list of the ten Molde players with the most appearances in the top division.

Nr	Player	Years	Matches
1	Daniel Berg Hestad	1993–2003, 2005–2016	473
2	Vegard Forren	2007–2013, 2013–2017, 2017–2019	286
3	Mattias Moström	2007–2020	273
4	Magne Hoseth	1999–2004, 2006–2014	260
5	Ulrich Møller	1980–1994	250
6	Stein Olav Hestad	1971–1989	249
7	Trond Strande	1991–2007	238
8	Morten Bakke	1991–2001	235
9	Etzaz Hussain	2012–2015, 2017–2022	202
10	Petter Rudi	1991–2006	199

Last updated: 13 November 2022

==== Most appearances in European Competitions ====
Appearances in UEFA Champions League, UEFA Europa League, UEFA Cup, UEFA Europa Conference League and UEFA Cup Winners' Cup are counted. Qualification games are included.

Nr	Player	Years	Matches
1	Daniel Berg Hestad	1993–2016	66
2	Etzaz Hussain	2012–2022	63
2	**Magnus Wolf Eikrem**	2012–present	63
4	Vegard Forren	2007–2019	52
5	**Eirik Hestad**	2012–2021	46
6	Mattias Moström	2007–2020	43
7	**Martin Linnes**	2012–present	41
8	Fredrik Aursnes	2016–2021	35
9	**Kristoffer Haugen**	2018–present	34
9	**Erling Knudtzon**	2019–present	34

Last updated: 3 November 2022

=== Goalscorers ===
- Most goals scored in all competitions: **174** – Jan Fuglset
- Most goals in a season in all competitions: **39** – Andreas Lund, 1999
- Most League goals in a season: **27**
  - Ohi Omoijuanfo, Eliteserien (level 1), 2021
- Top League scorer with fewest goals in a season: **4**
  - Magne Hoseth, 2004
  - Bernt Hulsker, 2004
  - Thomas Mork, 2004
- Most goals scored in a match: **6** – Jan Fuglset v Strømsgodset, 17 October 1976

=== Most goals scored ===
The following is a list of the twelve Molde players who have scored the most top division goals.

Nr.	Player	Years	Goals
1	Magne Hoseth	1999–2004, 2006–2014	84
2	Daniel Berg Hestad	1993–2002, 2005–2016	72
3	Jan Fuglset	1973–1982	57
4	Ohi Omoijuanfo	2019–2021	54
5	Ole Bjørn Sundgot	1991–1999	47
6	Andreas Lund	1996–2000	42
7	Odd Inge Olsen	1996–2001	41
8	**Magnus Wolff Eikrem**	2011–2013, 2018–present	39
9	Øystein Neerland	1987–1993	35
10	Pape Paté Diouf	2006–2011, 2012, 2014–2016	34
10	Daniel Chima Chukwu	2010–2015, 2018–2019	34

Last updated: 13 November 2022

=== Award winners ===
Kniksen Award (1990–2013)/"Golden Ball" (2014–)

- Goalkeeper of the Year:

Morten Bakke, 1995
Espen Bugge Pettersen, 2011
Ørjand Håskjold Nyland, 2014, 2015

- Defender of the Year:

Knut Olav Rindarøy, 2009
Vegard Forren, 2012
Martin Linnes, 2014

- Midfielder of the Year:

Øyvind Leonhardsen, 1991
Makhtar Thioune, 2009
Magnus Wolff Eikrem, 2011, 2012

- Manager/Coach of the Year:

Ole Gunnar Solskjær, 2011, 2012
Tor Ole Skullerud, 2014
Erling Moe, 2022

- Breakthrough of the Year:

Erling Haaland, 2018

- Young Player of the Year:

Sivert Mannsverk, 2022

=== Internationals ===
- First international: Arne Legernes for Norway against Poland, 30 May 1956
  - The first non-Norwegian to be capped: Jákup Mikkelsen for Faroe Islands against Yugoslavia, 15 August 2001
- Most international caps (total): **88** - Eiður Guðjohnsen - Iceland (4 while with the club)
- Most international caps as a Molde player: **35** - Åge Hareide - Norway

=== Transfers ===
==== Highest transfer fees received ====
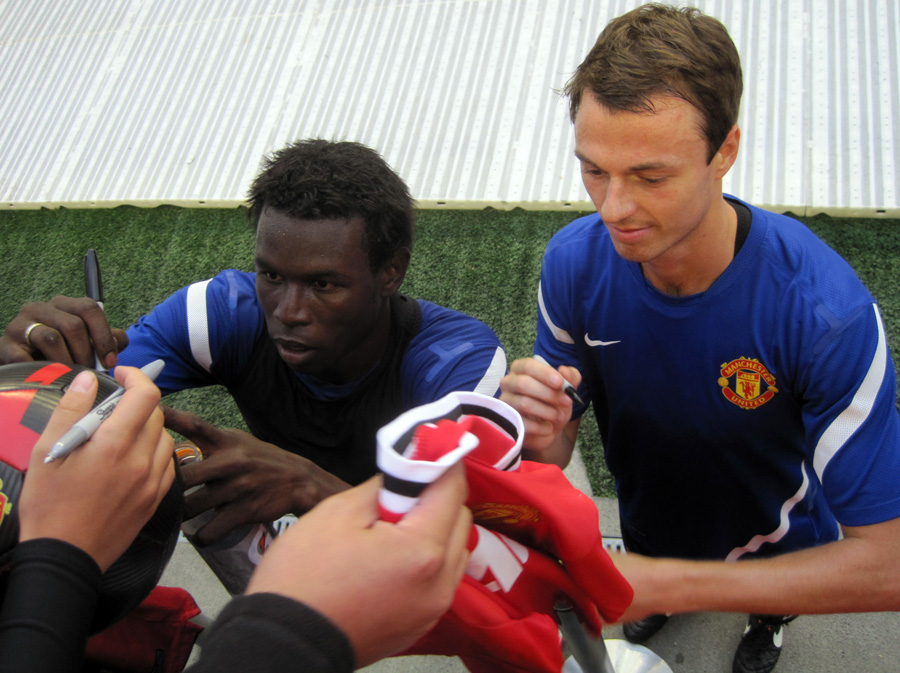
Mame Biram Diouf (left) after signing for Manchester United.

The club's record sale came in January 2023, when David Datro Fofana was sold to Chelsea for €12 million. August 2018, when Erling Haaland was sold to Red Bull Salzburg for €5,0 million. The previous record was set in August 2018, when Molde sold Erling Haaland to Red Bull Salzburg for €5,0 million.

	Player	To	Fee	Dat
1	(Ivory Coast) David Datro Fofana	(England) Chelsea	€12,0 million	Jan 2023
2	(Norway) Erling Haaland	(Austria) Red Bull Salzburg	€5,0 million	Aug 2018
3	(Senegal) Mame Biram Diouf	(England) Manchester United	€4,5 million	July 2009
4	(Norway) Vegard Forren	(England) Southampton	€3,5 million	Jan 2013
5	(Norway) Mohamed Elyounoussi	(Switzerland) Basel	€3,2 million	Jul 2016
6	(Norway) Mats Møller Dæhli	(Wales) Cardiff	€3,0 million	Jan 2014
7	(Norway) Ole Gunnar Solskjær	(England) Manchester United	€2,5 million	Jul 1996
8	(Senegal) Pape Paté Diouf	(Denmark) FC Copenhagen	€2,4 million	July 2011
9	(Norway) Martin Linnes	(Turkey) Galatasaray	€2,0 million	Jan 2016
10	(Canada) Rob Friend	(Netherlands) Heerenveen	€2,0 million	July 2006

== Team records ==
=== Divisional movements ===
Tier	Series	Years	Last	Promotions	Relegations
1	Eliteserien	48	2024	—	1947–48, 1957–58, 1978, 1980, 1982, 1993, 2006
2	Landsdelsserien (Regional) (1937–1962)	15	1961–62	1956–57	1961–62
2	1. divisjon (1963–)	8	2007	1973, 1979, 1981, 1983, 1994, 2007	never
3	2. divisjon	8	1970	1970	never
79 years of national league football in Norway since 1937

=== Matches ===
- First competitive match: Kristiansund 2–2 International, 5 August 1912
- First Norwegian Football Cup match: Rollon 2–1 Molde, qualifying round 1921
- First League match:
- First match at Molde Stadion: Molde 1–0 Aalesund, 28 August 1955
- First match at Aker Stadion: Molde 4–0 Lillestrøm, 18 April 1998
- First European match: Molde 1–0 Östers IF, UEFA Cup 1st Round, first leg, 17 September 1975

==== Record wins ====
- Record win:

12–1 v Rollon, Møreligaen (level 2), 26 May 1957
12–1 v Mandalskameratene, 1. divisjon (level 2), 26 August 2007
11–0 v Langevåg, Norwegian Football Cup 2nd round, 24 June 1987
11–0 v Bergsøy, Norwegian Football Cup 2nd round, 21 June 1989
11–0 v Eidsvåg, Norwegian Football Cup 1st round, 1 May 2011

- Record League win:

12–1 v Rollon, Møreligaen (level 2), 26 May 1957
12–1 v Mandalskameratene, 1. divisjon (level 2), 26 August 2007

- Record Eliteserien win: 8–0 v Moss, Tippeligaen, 21 April 1996
- Record Norwegian Football Cup win:

11–0 v Langevåg, 2nd round, 24 June 1987
11–0 v Bergsøy, 2nd round, 21 June 1989
11–0 v Eidsvåg, 1st round, 1 May 2011

- Record European win: 7–1 v KR, Europa League first qualifying round, first leg, 11 July 2019
- Record Champions League win: 3–2 v Olympiacos, Champions League Group Stage, second leg, 20 October 1999
- Record home win:

12–1 v Rollon, Møreligaen (level 2), 26 May 1957
12–1 v Mandalskameratene, 1. divisjon (level 2), 26 August 2007
11–0 v Langevåg, 2nd round, 24 June 1987
11–0 v Bergsøy, 2nd round, 21 June 1989

- Record away win: 11–0 v Eidsvåg, 1st round, 1 May 2011

==== Record defeats ====
- Record defeat: 0–8 v Stabæk, Tippeligaen, 29 October 2006
- Record League defeat: 0–8 v Stabæk, Tippeligaen, 29 October 2006
- Record Eliteserien defeat: 0–8 v Stabæk, Tippeligaen, 29 October 2006
- Record Norwegian Football Cup defeat:

0–7 v Rollon, 1st round, 1930
1–8 v Kristiansund, 1st round, 1931

- Record European defeat: 0–6 v Öster, UEFA Cup 1st Round, 1 October 1975
- Record Champions League defeat: 1–4 v Real Madrid, Group stage, second leg, 21 September 1999
- Record home defeat:

0–7 v Strømsgodset, Tippeligaen, 9 June 1991
0–7 v Tromsø, Tippeligaen, 2 September 1995

- Record away defeat: 0–8 v Stabæk, Tippeligaen, 29 October 2006

==== Streaks ====
Only top-tier seasons

- Longest unbeaten run (all major competitions): 26 matches, 13 April 1998 to 22 August 1998
- Longest unbeaten run (League): 24 matches, from 13 April 2014 to 18 October 2014
- Longest unbeaten run from start of the season (League): 21 matches, from the start of the 1998 season to 20 September 1998
- Longest winning streak (League): 17 matches,

from 10 July 2022 to 13 November 2022

- Longest losing streak (League): 5 matches,

from 11 August 1996 to 8 September 1996
from 31 July 2005 to 10 September 2005

- Longest drawing streak (League): 5 matches, from 21 September 1975 to 19 October 1975
- Longest streak without a win (League): 10 matches,

from 1 October 2006 to 27 April 2008
from 24 May 2010 to 29 August 2010

- Longest scoring run (League): 40 matches,
  - From 23 June 2018 to 29 September 2019
- Longest non-scoring run (League): 5 matches, from 20 October 1996 to 8 May 1997
- Longest streak without conceding a goal (League): 4 matches,

from 4 May 2002 to 9 June 2002
from 18 September 2022 to 16 October 2022

==== Wins/draws/losses in a season ====
Only top-tier seasons.

- Most wins in a league season: 25 – 2022
- Most draws in a league season: 10 – 2004, 2010
- Most defeats in a league season: 15 – 1978, 2006
- Fewest wins in a league season: 1 – 1957–58
- Fewest wins in a league season (30 games): 10 – 2010
- Fewest draws in a league season: 2 – 1978, 1999
- Fewest draws in a league season (30 games): 3 – 2022
- Fewest defeats in a league season: 2 – 2022
- Highest league win margin: 18 points in 2022, ahead of Bodø/Glimt
- Smallest league win margin: 4 points in 2012, ahead of Strømsgodset

=== Goals ===
Only top-tier seasons.

- Most League goals scored in a season:

In a 30 game season: 77 – 2020
In a 26 game season: 70 – 1998
In a 22 game season: 40 – 1974, 1988, 1989
In a 14 game season: 18 – 1957–58

- Fewest League goals scored:

In a 30 game season: 42 – 2010
In a 26 game season: 29 – 2006
In a 22 game season: 23 – 1993
In a 14 game season: 18 – 1957–58

- Most League goals conceded in a season:

In a 30 game season: 45 – 2010
In a 26 game season: 50 – 2006
In a 22 game season: 41 – 1982, 1984
In a 14 game season: 38 – 1957–58

- Fewest League goals conceded:

In a 30 game season: 24 – 2014
In a 26 game season: 26 – 2002
In a 22 game season: 18 – 1974
In a 14 game season: 38 – 1957–58

=== Points ===
Only top-tier seasons.

- Most points in a season:

Two points for a win:

30 in 22 matches, 1. divisjon, 1974
7 in 14 matches, Hovedserien, 1957–58

Three points for a win:

78 in 30 matches, Eliteserien, 2022
54 in 26 matches, Tippeligaen, 1998
40 in 22 matches, 1. divisjon, 1990

- Fewest points in a season:

Two points for a win:

12 in 22 matches, 1. divisjon, 1978
7 in 14 matches, Hovedserien, 1957–58

Three points for a win:

40 in 30 matches, Tippeligaen, 2010
25 in 26 matches, Tippeligaen, 2006
22 in 22 matches, Tippeligaen, 1993

=== Attendances ===
- Highest home attendance: 14,793 v Moss, 10 October 1987
- Highest home attendance at Aker Stadion: 13,308 v Rosenborg, 26 September 1998
- Highest away attendance: 43,651 v Steaua București 25 October 2012

== Record by opponent ==
As of 13 November 2022

=== Key ===
- The records include the results of matches played in divisions of Norwegian football (from 1937 to present). Wartime matches are regarded as unofficial and are excluded, as are matches from the abandoned 1939–40 season. Test Matches are not included.
- † Teams with this background and symbol in the "Club" column are competing in the 2023 Eliteserien alongside Molde.
- ‡ Clubs with this background and symbol in the "Club" column are defunct.
- P = matches played; W = matches won; D = matches drawn; L = matches lost; F = Goals scored; A = Goals conceded; Win% = percentage of total matches won

=== League record ===
1963–2022:

Molde FK league record by opponent
Club	P	W	D	L	P	W	D	L	P	W	D	L	GF	GA	Win% (Note: Win% is rounded to two decimal places)
Club	Home				Away				Total						Win%
Aalesund †	23	15	3	5	23	14	6	3	46	29	9	8	93	44	63.04
Åndalsnes	5	4	1	0	5	4	0	1	10	8	1	1	21	8	80.00
Åsane	1	1	0	0	1	1	0	0	2	2	0	0	4	0	100.00
Aurskog	1	1	0	0	1	0	1	0	2	1	1	0	2	0	50.00
Bergsøy	2	1	1	0	2	0	1	1	4	1	2	1	6	6	25.00
Bodø/Glimt †	28	17	1	10	28	13	4	11	56	30	5	21	115	91	53.57
Braatt	3	2	0	1	3	2	1	0	6	4	1	1	19	8	66.67
Brann †	38	23	6	9	38	15	8	15	76	38	14	24	140	109	50.00
Brumunddal	1	1	0	0	1	1	0	0	2	2	0	0	7	1	100.00
Bryn	1	1	0	0	1	1	0	0	2	2	0	0	8	0	100.00
Bryne	17	11	3	3	17	5	3	9	34	16	6	12	65	52	47.06
Clausenengen	9	8	1	0	9	5	0	4	18	13	1	4	44	21	72.22
Dahle	1	1	0	0	1	0	1	0	2	1	1	0	4	3	50.00
Djerv 1919	1	1	0	0	1	1	0	0	2	2	0	0	2	0	100.00
Eidsvold Turn	1	1	0	0	1	1	0	0	2	2	0	0	5	0	100.00
Eik-Tønsberg	3	2	1	0	3	0	1	2	6	2	2	2	8	7	33.33
Fana	1	0	0	1	1	0	0	1	2	0	0	2	2	4	0.00
Florvåg	1	1	0	0	1	1	0	0	2	2	0	0	6	2	100.00
Fredrikstad	12	7	2	3	12	4	3	5	24	11	5	8	39	28	45.83
Frigg	2	1	0	1	2	0	0	2	4	1	0	3	4	12	25.00
Fyllingen ‡	4	1	2	1	4	0	2	2	8	1	4	3	10	16	12.50
Gossen	2	2	0	0	2	2	0	0	4	4	0	0	14	2	100.00
HamKam †	15	7	6	2	15	5	4	6	30	12	10	8	45	38	40.00
Haugesund †	17	13	1	3	17	9	5	3	34	22	6	6	61	42	64.71
Herd	7	4	2	1	7	2	0	5	14	6	2	6	21	19	42.86
Hødd	7	5	1	1	7	3	1	3	14	8	2	4	43	28	57.14
Hønefoss	4	3	1	0	4	2	2	0	8	5	3	0	13	3	62.50
Jerv	1	0	1	0	1	1	0	0	2	1	1	0	5	3	50.00
Jevnaker	1	1	0	0	1	1	0	0	2	2	0	0	9	1	100.00
Kongsvinger	17	10	2	5	17	7	4	6	34	17	6	11	52	38	50.00
Kristiansund BK	6	4	1	1	6	2	1	3	12	6	2	4	19	16	50.00
Kristiansund FK	6	5	1	0	6	3	2	1	12	8	3	1	33	9	66.67
Langevåg	8	5	1	2	8	2	2	4	16	7	3	6	30	21	43.75
Lillestrøm †	42	16	14	12	42	12	12	18	84	28	26	30	107	128	33.33
Løv-Ham ‡	1	1	0	0	1	1	0	0	2	2	0	0	5	1	100.00
Lyn	16	9	1	6	16	8	2	6	32	17	3	12	59	46	53.13
Mandalskameratene	1	1	0	0	1	1	0	0	2	2	0	0	15	1	100.00
Mjølner	4	3	1	0	4	2	2	0	8	5	3	0	17	4	62.50
Mjøndalen	14	11	2	1	14	7	4	3	28	18	6	4	52	24	64.29
Mo	3	2	1	0	3	1	1	1	6	3	2	1	11	7	50.00
Moss	17	8	5	4	17	9	4	4	34	17	9	8	62	47	50.00
Nessegutten	2	2	0	0	2	0	1	1	4	2	1	1	10	6	50.00
Notodden	1	1	0	0	1	0	0	1	2	1	0	1	1	2	50.00
Odd †	22	14	5	3	22	4	10	8	44	18	15	11	69	44	40.91
Ørsta	2	2	0	0	2	2	0	0	4	4	0	0	12	2	100.00
Os	1	1	0	0	1	0	1	0	2	1	1	0	2	1	50.00
Ranheim	2	1	0	1	2	1	0	1	4	2	0	2	8	8	50.00
Raufoss	4	1	0	3	4	2	0	2	8	3	0	5	7	14	37.50
Rosenborg †	43	18	5	20	43	10	7	26	86	28	12	46	98	145	32.56
Sandefjord †	9	5	2	2	9	4	2	3	18	9	4	5	43	29	50.00
Sandnes Ulf	3	3	0	0	3	2	1	0	6	5	1	0	15	5	83.33
Sarpsborg 08 †	11	7	3	1	11	3	2	6	22	10	5	7	46	24	45.45
Sarpsborg FK	1	1	0	0	1	1	0	0	2	2	0	0	6	1	100.00
Skarbøvik	4	3	1	0	4	3	1	0	8	6	2	0	17	7	75.00
Skeid	9	2	3	4	9	5	2	2	18	7	5	6	30	24	38.89
Sogndal	20	13	5	2	20	9	5	6	40	22	10	8	81	51	55.00
Sparta Sarpsborg	1	1	0	0	1	1	0	0	2	2	0	0	3	1	100.00
Spjelkavik	1	1	0	0	1	1	0	0	2	2	0	0	6	0	100.00
Stabæk †	26	15	8	3	26	12	3	11	52	27	11	14	101	81	51.92
Start	31	14	7	10	31	9	8	14	62	23	15	24	101	88	37.10
Steinkjer	7	4	1	2	7	2	3	2	14	6	4	4	29	19	42.86
Stjørdals-Blink	2	2	0	0	2	1	1	0	4	3	1	0	12	4	75.00
Strindheim	4	1	3	0	4	2	2	0	8	3	5	0	19	12	37.50
Strømmen	2	1	0	1	2	1	1	0	4	2	1	1	7	5	50.00
Strømsgodset †	26	13	8	5	26	15	5	6	52	28	13	11	98	68	53.85
Sunndal	1	0	1	0	1	0	1	0	2	0	2	0	0	0	0.00
Træff	1	0	1	0	1	1	0	0	2	1	1	0	5	2	50.00
Tromsdalen	1	1	0	0	1	1	0	0	2	2	0	0	3	1	100.00
Tromsø †	35	22	9	4	35	17	9	9	70	39	18	13	140	78	55.71
Vålerenga †	39	24	6	9	39	19	8	12	78	43	14	21	147	91	55.13
Vard Haugesund	3	2	1	0	3	1	2	0	6	3	3	0	10	5	50.00
Varegg	1	0	1	0	1	1	0	0	2	1	1	0	7	1	50.00
Verdal	1	1	0	0	1	1	0	0	2	2	0	0	4	0	100.00
Vidar	1	1	0	0	1	0	1	0	2	1	1	0	4	0	50.00
Viking †	41	17	9	15	41	12	8	21	82	29	17	36	130	145	35.37
VRF	4	4	0	0	4	3	1	0	8	7	1	0	26	5	87.50
