= 1955–56 Landsdelsserien =

Landsdelsserien
- Season: 1955–56
- Promoted: Sparta; Strømmen; Årstad; Steinkjer
- Relegated: Herkules; Drafn; Nedenes; Varhaug; Kopervik; Fana; Djerv; Clausenengen; Træff; Rosenborg; Falken; Wing

The 1955–56 Landsdelsserien was a Norwegian second-tier football league season.

The league was contested by 54 teams, divided into a total of seven groups from four districts; Østland/Søndre, Østland/Nordre, Sørland/Vestre and Møre/Trøndelag. The two group winners in the Østland districts, Sparta and Strømmen promoted directly to the 1956–57 Hovedserien. The other five group winners qualified for promotion play-offs to compete for two spots in the following season's top flight. Årstad and Steinkjer won the play-offs and were promoted.

== Tables ==
=== District Østland/Søndre ===
Pos	Team	Pld	W	D	L	GF	GA	GD	Pts	Promotion or relegation
1	Sparta (P)	14	9	2	3	28	16	+12	20	Promotion to Hovedserien
2	Greåker	14	7	4	3	33	12	+21	18	
3	Snøgg	14	6	4	4	33	25	+8	16	
4	Fram	14	7	0	7	22	28	−6	14	
5	Pors	14	4	5	5	23	25	−2	13	
6	Ørn	14	4	4	6	16	20	−4	12	
7	Moss	14	4	3	7	29	26	+3	11	
8	Herkules (R)	14	2	4	8	13	45	−32	8	Relegation to 3. divisjon

Source: rsssf.no
Rules for classification: 1) points; 2) goal difference; 3) number of goals scored.
(P) Promoted; (R) Relegated

=== District Østland/Nordre ===
Pos	Team	Pld	W	D	L	GF	GA	GD	Pts	Promotion or relegation
1	Strømmen (P)	14	12	1	1	48	17	+31	25	Promotion to Hovedserien
2	Lyn	14	7	3	4	40	20	+20	17	
3	Kapp	14	7	3	4	37	22	+15	17	
4	Raufoss	14	7	3	4	36	26	+10	17	
5	Vestfossen	14	5	3	6	29	34	−5	13	
6	Gjøvik-Lyn	14	4	3	7	21	28	−7	11	
7	Hamar	14	3	2	9	26	51	−25	8	
8	Drafn (R)	14	1	2	11	14	53	−39	4	Relegation to 3. divisjon

Source: rsssf.no
Rules for classification: 1) points; 2) goal difference; 3) number of goals scored.
(P) Promoted; (R) Relegated

=== District Sørland/Vestland ===
==== Group A1 ====
Pos	Team	Pld	W	D	L	GF	GA	GD	Pts	Qualification or relegation
1	Start	12	8	4	0	32	8	+24	20	Qualification for the promotion play-offs
2	Donn	12	6	3	3	34	23	+11	15	
3	Jerv	12	5	3	4	36	24	+12	13	
4	Flekkefjord	12	6	1	5	23	17	+6	13	
5	Grane	12	4	2	6	25	35	−10	10	
6	Sørfjell	12	3	1	8	17	35	−18	7	
7	Nedenes (R)	12	1	4	7	18	43	−25	6	Relegation to 3. divisjon

Source: rsssf.no
Rules for classification: 1) points; 2) goal difference; 3) number of goals scored.
(R) Relegated

==== Group A2 ====
Pos	Team	Pld	W	D	L	GF	GA	GD	Pts	Qualification or relegation
1	Ulf	14	8	5	1	29	14	+15	21	Qualification for the promotion play-offs
2	Vard	14	7	3	4	25	15	+10	17	
3	Stavanger	14	7	3	4	29	22	+7	17	
4	Bryne	14	5	4	5	34	27	+7	14	
5	Djerv 1919	14	6	1	7	22	23	−1	13	
6	Vidar	14	5	3	6	17	23	−6	13	
7	Varhaug (R)	14	5	2	7	25	38	−13	12	Relegation to 3. divisjon
8	Kopervik (R)	14	1	3	10	12	31	−19	5	Relegation to 3. divisjon

Source: rsssf.no
Rules for classification: 1) points; 2) goal difference; 3) number of goals scored.
(R) Relegated

==== Group B ====
Pos	Team	Pld	W	D	L	GF	GA	GD	Pts	Qualification or relegation
1	Årstad (O, P)	12	11	1	0	45	7	+38	23	Qualification for the promotion play-offs
2	Baune	12	6	2	4	26	18	+8	14	
3	Nordnes	12	5	2	5	21	23	−2	12	
4	Nymark	12	4	2	6	18	27	−9	10	
5	Os	12	4	1	7	22	30	−8	9	
6	Fana (R)	12	3	3	6	15	31	−16	9	Relegation to 3. divisjon
7	Djerv (R)	12	2	3	7	17	28	−11	7	Relegation to 3. divisjon

Source: rsssf.no
Rules for classification: 1) points; 2) goal difference; 3) number of goals scored.
(O) Play-off winners; (P) Promoted; (R) Relegated

=== District Møre/Trøndelag ===
==== Møre ====
Pos	Team	Pld	W	D	L	GF	GA	GD	Pts	Qualification or relegation
1	Molde	14	13	0	1	39	6	+33	26	Qualification for the promotion play-offs
2	Kristiansund	14	11	1	2	40	16	+24	23	
3	Langevåg	14	7	2	5	37	27	+10	16	
4	Hødd	14	6	1	7	27	23	+4	13	
5	Aalesund	14	3	4	7	20	23	−3	10	
6	Braatt	14	4	2	8	21	37	−16	10	
7	Clausenengen (R)	14	3	1	10	20	38	−18	7	Relegation to 3. divisjon
8	Framtid (R)	14	3	1	10	15	49	−34	7	Relegation to 3. divisjon

Source: rsssf.no
Rules for classification: 1) points; 2) goal difference; 3) number of goals scored.
(R) Relegated

==== Trøndelag ====
Pos	Team	Pld	W	D	L	GF	GA	GD	Pts	Qualification or relegation
1	Steinkjer (O, P)	14	11	2	1	50	22	+28	24	Qualification for the promotion play-offs
2	Sverre	14	8	3	3	36	24	+12	19	
3	Brage	14	8	2	4	38	26	+12	18	
4	Freidig	14	7	2	5	29	20	+9	16	
5	Stjørdals/Blink	14	5	4	5	28	32	−4	14	
6	Rosenborg (R)	14	3	4	7	15	27	−12	10	Relegation to 3. divisjon
7	Falken (R)	14	4	1	9	26	39	−13	9	Relegation to 3. divisjon
8	Wing (R)	14	1	0	13	9	41	−32	2	Relegation to 3. divisjon

Source: rsssf.no
Rules for classification: 1) points; 2) goal difference; 3) number of goals scored.
(O) Play-off winners; (P) Promoted; (R) Relegated

== Promotion play-offs ==
Sørland/Vestland
Results A1–A2

- Ulf 6–3 Start

Results A–B

- Årstad 2–0 Ulf

Årstad won 2–0 over Ulf and were promoted to Hovedserien.

Møre/Trøndelag

- Molde 2–4 Steinkjer
- Steinkjer 3–2 Molde

Steinkjer won 7–4 on aggregate and were promoted to Hovedserien.
