= 1956–57 Landsdelsserien =

Landsdelsserien
- Season: 1956–57
- Promoted: Eik; Raufoss; Brann; Molde
- Relegated: Snøgg; Ørn; Pors; Spartacus; Hamar; Risør; Nærbø; Vidar; Nymark; Framtid; Ranheim; Troll

The 1956–57 Landsdelsserien was a Norwegian second-tier football league season.

The league was contested by 54 teams, divided into a total of seven groups from four districts; Østland/Søndre, Østland/Nordre, Sørland/Vestre and Møre/Trøndelag. The two group winners in the Østland districts, Eik and Raufoss promoted directly to the 1957–58 Hovedserien. The other five group winners qualified for promotion play-offs to compete for two spots in the following season's top flight. Brann and Molde won the play-offs and were promoted.

== Tables ==
=== District Østland/Søndre ===
Pos	Team	Pld	W	D	L	GF	GA	GD	Pts	Promotion or relegation
1	Eik (P)	14	11	0	3	44	19	+25	22	Promotion to Hovedserien
2	Fram	14	9	3	2	31	14	+17	21	
3	Greåker	14	8	3	3	28	17	+11	19	
4	Moss	14	7	0	7	32	29	+3	14	
5	Lisleby	14	6	0	8	28	36	−8	12	
6	Snøgg (R)	14	4	1	9	24	43	−19	9	Relegation to 3. divisjon
7	Ørn (R)	14	3	2	9	18	33	−15	8	Relegation to 3. divisjon
8	Pors (R)	14	3	1	10	23	37	−14	7	Relegation to 3. divisjon

Source: rsssf.no
Rules for classification: 1) points; 2) goal difference; 3) number of goals scored.
(P) Promoted; (R) Relegated

=== District Østland/Nordre ===
Pos	Team	Pld	W	D	L	GF	GA	GD	Pts	Promotion or relegation
1	Raufoss (P)	14	9	1	4	38	21	+17	19	Promotion to Hovedserien
2	Kapp	14	8	2	4	44	28	+16	18	
3	Mjøndalen	14	6	4	4	28	21	+7	16	
4	Gjøvik-Lyn	14	7	2	5	25	25	0	16	
5	Lyn	14	5	2	7	27	33	−6	12	
6	Vestfossen	14	5	2	7	19	26	−7	12	
7	Spartacus (R)	14	4	2	8	23	34	−11	10	Relegation to 3. divisjon
8	Hamar (R)	14	1	7	6	23	39	−16	9	Relegation to 3. divisjon

Source: rsssf.no
Rules for classification: 1) points; 2) goal difference; 3) number of goals scored.
(P) Promoted; (R) Relegated

=== District Sørland/Vestland ===
==== Group A1 ====
Pos	Team	Pld	W	D	L	GF	GA	GD	Pts	Qualification or relegation
1	Donn	12	9	1	2	44	15	+29	19	Qualification for the promotion play-offs
2	Jerv	12	6	2	4	30	25	+5	14	
3	Grane	12	7	0	5	25	24	+1	14	
4	Start	12	6	1	5	38	24	+14	13	
5	Sørfjell	12	6	1	5	40	28	+12	13	
6	Flekkefjord	12	5	1	6	25	30	−5	11	
7	Lyngdal (R)	12	0	0	12	15	71	−56	0	Relegation to 3. divisjon

Source: rsssf.no
Rules for classification: 1) points; 2) goal difference; 3) number of goals scored.
(R) Relegated

==== Group A2 ====
Pos	Team	Pld	W	D	L	GF	GA	GD	Pts	Qualification or relegation
1	Stavanger	14	10	2	2	32	19	+13	22	Qualification for the promotion play-offs
2	Vard	14	7	1	6	30	26	+4	15	
3	Bryne	14	6	2	6	25	22	+3	14	
4	Jarl	14	5	3	6	22	19	+3	13	
5	Djerv 1919	14	4	5	5	18	20	−2	13	
6	Ulf	14	6	1	7	28	31	−3	13	
7	Nærbø (R)	14	5	2	7	27	36	−9	12	Relegation to 3. divisjon
8	Vidar (R)	14	3	4	7	16	25	−9	10	Relegation to 3. divisjon

Source: rsssf.no
Rules for classification: 1) points; 2) goal difference; 3) number of goals scored.
(R) Relegated

==== Group B ====
Pos	Team	Pld	W	D	L	GF	GA	GD	Pts	Qualification or relegation
1	Brann (O, P)	12	9	1	2	40	10	+30	19	Qualification for the promotion play-offs
2	Varegg	12	8	2	2	45	19	+26	18	
3	Nordnes	12	6	2	4	19	13	+6	14	
4	Baune	12	6	0	6	28	31	−3	12	
5	Os	12	3	3	6	14	29	−15	9	
6	Hardy	12	3	2	7	14	26	−12	8	
7	Nymark (R)	12	1	2	9	8	40	−32	4	Relegation to 3. divisjon

Source: rsssf.no
Rules for classification: 1) points; 2) goal difference; 3) number of goals scored.
(O) Play-off winners; (P) Promoted; (R) Relegated

=== District Møre/Trøndelag ===
==== Møre ====
Pos	Team	Pld	W	D	L	GF	GA	GD	Pts	Qualification or relegation
1	Molde (O, P)	14	11	2	1	60	12	+48	24	Qualification for the promotion play-offs
2	Langevåg	14	8	3	3	37	20	+17	19	
3	Kristiansund	14	9	0	5	36	22	+14	18	
4	Hødd	14	7	4	3	33	21	+12	18	
5	Aalesund	14	4	5	5	22	24	−2	13	
6	Braatt	14	4	3	7	30	40	−10	11	
7	Rollon	14	2	3	9	13	52	−39	7	
8	Framtid (R)	14	0	2	12	7	47	−40	2	Relegation to 3. divisjon

Source: rsssf.no
Rules for classification: 1) points; 2) goal difference; 3) number of goals scored.
(O) Play-off winners; (P) Promoted; (R) Relegated

==== Trøndelag ====
Pos	Team	Pld	W	D	L	GF	GA	GD	Pts	Qualification or relegation
1	Sverre	14	8	3	3	39	26	+13	19	Qualification for the promotion play-offs
2	Brage	14	6	6	2	36	19	+17	18	
3	Kvik	14	5	7	2	24	15	+9	17	
4	Freidig	14	4	7	3	31	14	+17	15	
5	Nessegutten	14	5	5	4	22	20	+2	15	
6	Stjørdals/Blink	14	5	4	5	20	31	−11	14	
7	Ranheim (R)	14	3	3	8	23	27	−4	9	Relegation to 3. divisjon
8	Troll (R)	14	1	3	10	8	51	−43	5	Relegation to 3. divisjon

Source: rsssf.no
Rules for classification: 1) points; 2) goal difference; 3) number of goals scored.
(R) Relegated

== Promotion play-offs ==
Sørland/Vestland
Results A1–A2

- Stavanger 4–1 Donn

Results A–B

- Brann 4–1 Stavanger

Brann won 4–1 over Stavanger and were promoted to Hovedserien.

Møre/Trøndelag

- Molde 0–1 Sverre
- Sverre 2–5 Molde

Molde won 5–3 on aggregate and were promoted to Hovedserien.
