= 1958–59 Landsdelsserien =

Landsdelsserien
- Season: 1958–59
- Promoted: Rapid; Vålerengen; Start; Brage
- Relegated: Sprint/Jeløy; Vestfossen; Fremad; Lena; Ulf; Nærbø; Hardy; Baune; Volda; Dahle; Verdal; Falken

The 1958–59 Landsdelsserien was a Norwegian second-tier football league season.

The league was contested by 54 teams, divided into a total of seven groups from four districts; Østland/Søndre, Østland/Nordre, Sørland/Vestre and Møre/Trøndelag. The two group winners in the Østland districts, Rapid and Vålerengen promoted directly to the 1959–60 Hovedserien. The other five group winners qualified for promotion play-offs to compete for two spots in the following season's top flight. Start and Brage won the play-offs and were promoted.

== Tables ==
=== District Østland/Søndre ===
Pos	Team	Pld	W	D	L	GF	GA	GD	Pts	Promotion or relegation
1	Rapid (P)	14	7	6	1	23	13	+10	20	Promotion to Hovedserien
2	Selbak	14	7	4	3	34	21	+13	18	
3	Fram	14	6	5	3	24	23	+1	17	
4	Sarpsborg	14	6	4	4	28	15	+13	16	
5	Pors	14	6	4	4	31	21	+10	16	
6	Moss	14	6	4	4	23	20	+3	16	
7	Sparta	14	2	2	10	14	42	−28	6	
8	Sprint/Jeløy (R)	14	1	1	12	17	39	−22	3	Relegation to 3. divisjon

Source: rsssf.no
Rules for classification: 1) points; 2) goal difference; 3) number of goals scored.
(P) Promoted; (R) Relegated

=== District Østland/Nordre ===
Pos	Team	Pld	W	D	L	GF	GA	GD	Pts	Promotion or relegation
1	Vålerengen (P)	14	10	4	0	43	10	+33	24	Promotion to Hovedserien
2	Frigg	14	11	1	2	38	22	+16	23	
3	Lyn	14	8	1	5	29	21	+8	17	
4	Sandaker	14	7	2	5	23	18	+5	16	
5	Sagene	14	5	2	7	20	29	−9	12	
6	Vestfossen (R)	14	3	3	8	32	37	−5	9	Relegation to 3. divisjon
7	Fremad (R)	14	3	1	10	25	45	−20	7	Relegation to 3. divisjon
8	Lena (R)	14	1	2	11	24	52	−28	4	Relegation to 3. divisjon

Source: rsssf.no
Rules for classification: 1) points; 2) goal difference; 3) number of goals scored.
(P) Promoted; (R) Relegated

=== District Sørland/Vestland ===
==== Group A ====
Pos	Team	Pld	W	D	L	GF	GA	GD	Pts	Qualification
1	Start (O, P)	12	12	0	0	48	18	+30	24	Qualification for the promotion play-offs
2	Donn	12	7	2	3	30	21	+9	16	
3	Jerv	12	6	1	5	36	27	+9	13	
4	Grane	12	5	2	5	24	23	+1	12	
5	Flekkefjord	12	4	2	6	23	32	−9	10	
6	Nedenes	12	2	1	9	22	42	−20	5	
7	Sørfjell	12	2	0	10	20	40	−20	4	

Source: rsssf.no
Rules for classification: 1) points; 2) goal difference; 3) number of goals scored.
(O) Play-off winners; (P) Promoted

==== Group B ====
Pos	Team	Pld	W	D	L	GF	GA	GD	Pts	Qualification or relegation
1	Bryne	14	8	4	2	31	17	+14	20	Qualification for the promotion play-offs
2	Haugar	14	7	3	4	20	11	+9	17	
3	Egersund	14	5	5	4	22	23	−1	15	
4	Stavanger	14	6	2	6	37	26	+11	14	
5	Djerv 1919	14	6	1	7	19	28	−9	13	
6	Vard	14	4	4	6	22	21	+1	12	
7	Ulf (R)	14	5	2	7	18	26	−8	12	Relegation to 3. divisjon
8	Nærbø (R)	14	3	3	8	17	34	−17	9	Relegation to 3. divisjon

Source: rsssf.no
Rules for classification: 1) points; 2) goal difference; 3) number of goals scored.
(R) Relegated

==== Group C ====
Pos	Team	Pld	W	D	L	GF	GA	GD	Pts	Qualification or relegation
1	Os	12	10	1	1	36	14	+22	21	Qualification for the promotion play-offs
2	Sandviken	12	5	4	3	23	21	+2	14	
3	Varegg	12	6	2	4	18	18	0	14	
4	Nymark	12	4	5	3	16	13	+3	13	
5	Nordnes	12	5	2	5	10	14	−4	12	
6	Hardy (R)	12	1	3	8	10	19	−9	5	Relegation to 3. divisjon
7	Baune (R)	12	1	3	8	10	24	−14	5	Relegation to 3. divisjon

Source: rsssf.no
Rules for classification: 1) points; 2) goal difference; 3) number of goals scored.
(R) Relegated

=== District Møre/Trøndelag ===
==== Møre ====
Pos	Team	Pld	W	D	L	GF	GA	GD	Pts	Qualification or relegation
1	Hødd	14	10	3	1	51	16	+35	23	Qualification for the promotion play-offs
2	Kristiansund	14	9	2	3	44	11	+33	20	
3	Aalesund	14	7	5	2	22	20	+2	19	
4	Molde	14	6	3	5	33	26	+7	15	
5	Langevåg	14	4	4	6	24	33	−9	12	
6	Clausenengen	14	4	4	6	27	39	−12	12	
7	Volda (R)	14	3	2	9	27	49	−22	8	Relegation to 3. divisjon
8	Dahle (R)	14	1	1	12	14	48	−34	3	Relegation to 3. divisjon

Source: rsssf.no
Rules for classification: 1) points; 2) goal difference; 3) number of goals scored.
(R) Relegated

==== Trøndelag ====
Pos	Team	Pld	W	D	L	GF	GA	GD	Pts	Qualification or relegation
1	Brage (O, P)	14	7	5	2	25	17	+8	19	Qualification for the promotion play-offs
2	Nessegutten	14	7	3	4	31	23	+8	17	
3	Kvik	14	5	5	4	25	18	+7	15	
4	Steinkjer	14	6	3	5	25	25	0	15	
5	Neset	14	6	3	5	22	24	−2	15	
6	Sverre	14	5	3	6	23	24	−1	13	
7	Verdal (R)	14	4	5	5	25	28	−3	13	Relegation to 3. divisjon
8	Falken (R)	14	2	1	11	13	30	−17	5	Relegation to 3. divisjon

Source: rsssf.no
Rules for classification: 1) points; 2) goal difference; 3) number of goals scored.
(O) Play-off winners; (P) Promoted; (R) Relegated

== Promotion play-offs ==
Sørland/Vestland
Results

- Bryne 0–2 Start
- Start 2–0 Os
- Os 4–0 Bryne

Pos	Team	Pld	W	D	L	GF	GA	GD	Pts	Qualification
1	Start (O, P)	2	2	0	0	4	0	+4	4	Promotion to Hovedserien
2	Os	2	1	0	1	4	2	+2	2	Remained in Landsdelsserien
3	Bryne	2	0	0	2	0	6	−6	0	Remained in Landsdelsserien

Source: rsssf.no
Rules for classification: 1) points; 2) goal difference; 3) number of goals scored.
(O) Play-off winners; (P) Promoted

Møre/Trøndelag

- Hødd 2–3 Brage
- Brage 5–3 Hødd

Brage won 8–5 on aggregate and were promoted to Hovedserien.
