= 1953–54 Landsdelsserien =

Landsdelsserien
- Season: 1953–54
- Promoted: Fram; Vålerengen; Brann; Ranheim
- Relegated: Selbak; Lisleby; Sagene; Solberg; Trauma; Buøy; Kopervik; Voss; Fjell-Kameraterne; Ørsta; Halsa; Wing

The 1953–54 Landsdelsserien was a Norwegian second-tier football league season.

The league was contested by 54 teams, divided into a total of seven groups from four districts; Østland/Søndre, Østland/Nordre, Sørland/Vestre and Møre/Trøndelag. The two group winners in the Østland districts, Fram and Vålerengen promoted directly to the 1954–55 Hovedserien. The other five group winners qualified for promotion play-offs to compete for two spots in the following season's top flight. Brann and Ranheim won the play-offs and were promoted.

== Tables ==
=== District Østland/Søndre ===
Pos	Team	Pld	W	D	L	GF	GA	GD	Pts	Promotion or relegation
1	Fram (P)	14	9	2	3	33	16	+17	20	Promotion to Hovedserien
2	Eik	14	9	0	5	31	22	+9	18	
3	Pors	14	8	1	5	32	29	+3	17	
4	Ørn	14	7	3	4	25	23	+2	17	
5	Snøgg	14	5	4	5	20	24	−4	14	
6	Askim	14	5	1	8	22	24	−2	11	
7	Selbak (R)	14	3	3	8	19	26	−7	9	Relegation to 3. divisjon
8	Lisleby (R)	14	2	2	10	18	36	−18	6	Relegation to 3. divisjon

Source: rsssf.no
Rules for classification: 1) points; 2) goal difference; 3) number of goals scored.
(P) Promoted; (R) Relegated

=== District Østland/Nordre ===
Pos	Team	Pld	W	D	L	GF	GA	GD	Pts	Promotion or relegation
1	Vålerengen (P)	14	8	5	1	31	11	+20	21	Promotion to Hovedserien
2	Kapp	14	8	3	3	37	25	+12	19	
3	Lyn	14	8	2	4	30	15	+15	18	
4	Frigg	14	4	6	4	23	23	0	14	
5	Hamarkameratene	14	3	6	5	16	31	−15	12	
6	Raufoss	14	4	3	7	25	30	−5	11	
7	Sagene (R)	14	3	3	8	24	32	−8	9	Relegation to 3. divisjon
8	Solberg (R)	14	1	6	7	22	41	−19	8	Relegation to 3. divisjon

Source: rsssf.no
Rules for classification: 1) points; 2) goal difference; 3) number of goals scored.
(P) Promoted; (R) Relegated

=== District Sørland/Vestland ===
==== Group A1 ====
Pos	Team	Pld	W	D	L	GF	GA	GD	Pts	Qualification or relegation
1	Flekkefjord	12	10	2	0	49	6	+43	22	Qualification for the promotion play-offs
2	Start	12	6	3	3	36	14	+22	15	
3	Jerv	12	5	3	4	20	15	+5	13	
4	Donn	12	4	4	4	23	26	−3	12	
5	AIK Lund	12	4	3	5	20	30	−10	11	
6	Sørfjell	12	3	2	7	12	33	−21	8	
7	Trauma (R)	12	1	1	10	8	44	−36	3	Relegation to 3. divisjon

Source: rsssf.no
Rules for classification: 1) points; 2) goal difference; 3) number of goals scored.
(R) Relegated

==== Group A2 ====
Pos	Team	Pld	W	D	L	GF	GA	GD	Pts	Qualification or relegation
1	Bryne	14	8	5	1	45	18	+27	21	Qualification for the promotion play-offs
2	Ålgård	14	9	1	4	24	17	+7	19	
3	Djerv 1919	14	5	5	4	27	26	+1	15	
4	Stavanger	14	5	4	5	28	23	+5	14	
5	Vard	14	6	2	6	31	29	+2	14	
6	Nærbø	14	4	4	6	17	30	−13	12	
7	Buøy (R)	14	5	1	8	22	31	−9	11	Relegation to 3. divisjon
8	Kopervik (R)	14	1	4	9	11	31	−20	6	Relegation to 3. divisjon

Source: rsssf.no
Rules for classification: 1) points; 2) goal difference; 3) number of goals scored.
(R) Relegated

==== Group B ====
Pos	Team	Pld	W	D	L	GF	GA	GD	Pts	Qualification or relegation
1	Brann (O, P)	12	9	3	0	40	8	+32	21	Qualification for the promotion play-offs
2	Årstad	12	6	3	3	23	19	+4	15	
3	Baune	12	5	3	4	21	19	+2	13	
4	Djerv	12	4	3	5	15	21	−6	11	
5	Os	12	3	3	6	22	26	−4	9	
6	Voss (R)	12	4	1	7	14	25	−11	9	Relegation to 3. divisjon
7	Fjell-Kameraterne (R)	12	2	2	8	17	34	−17	6	Relegation to 3. divisjon

Source: rsssf.no
Rules for classification: 1) points; 2) goal difference; 3) number of goals scored.
(O) Play-off winners; (P) Promoted; (R) Relegated

=== District Møre/Trøndelag ===
==== Møre ====
Pos	Team	Pld	W	D	L	GF	GA	GD	Pts	Qualification or relegation
1	Molde	14	10	3	1	43	13	+30	23	Qualification for the promotion play-offs
2	Kristiansund	14	9	2	3	44	22	+22	20	
3	Aalesund	14	9	2	3	32	17	+15	20	
4	Langevåg	14	6	3	5	42	26	+16	15	
5	Hødd	14	5	3	6	35	28	+7	13	
6	Rollon	13	2	4	7	17	38	−21	8	
7	Ørsta (R)	14	1	4	9	14	40	−26	6	Relegation to 3. divisjon
8	Halsa (R)	14	2	2	10	17	60	−43	6	Relegation to 3. divisjon

Source: rsssf.no
Rules for classification: 1) points; 2) goal difference; 3) number of goals scored.
(R) Relegated

==== Trøndelag ====
Pos	Team	Pld	W	D	L	GF	GA	GD	Pts	Qualification or relegation
1	Ranheim (O, P)	14	10	3	1	35	12	+23	23	Qualification for the promotion play-offs
2	Kvik	14	8	1	5	24	25	−1	17	
3	Sverre	14	7	2	5	37	28	+9	16	
4	Steinkjer	14	7	2	5	28	26	+2	16	
5	Brage	14	5	4	5	35	30	+5	14	
6	Falken	14	4	4	6	26	23	+3	12	
7	Neset	14	3	2	9	19	47	−28	8	
8	Wing (R)	14	1	4	9	14	27	−13	6	Relegation to 3. divisjon

Source: rsssf.no
Rules for classification: 1) points; 2) goal difference; 3) number of goals scored.
(O) Play-off winners; (P) Promoted; (R) Relegated

== Promotion play-offs ==
Sørland/Vestland
Results A1–A2

- Flekkefjord 1–0 Bryne

Results A–B

- Brann 6–0 Flekkefjord

Brann won 6–0 over Flekkefjord and were promoted to Hovedserien.

Møre/Trøndelag

- Ranheim 2–0 Molde

Ranheim won 2–0 over Molde and were promoted to Hovedserien.
