= 1961–62 Landsdelsserien =

Landsdelsserien
- Season: 1961–62
- Promoted: Sarpsborg; Gjøvik-Lyn
- Relegated: 45 teams

The 1961–62 Landsdelsserien was a Norwegian second-tier football league season, the last named Landsdelsserien.

The league was contested by 55 teams, divided into a total of seven groups from four districts; Østland/Søndre, Østland/Nordre, Sørland/Vestre and Møre/Trøndelag. The seven group winners qualified for promotion play-offs to compete for two spots in the 1963 1. divisjon. Sarpsborg and Gjøvik-Lyn won the play-offs and were promoted to the top flight. Due to a format change in the league system, 45 teams were relegated to the 1963 3. divisjon.

== Tables ==
=== District Østland/Søndre ===
Pos	Team	Pld	W	D	L	GF	GA	GD	Pts	Qualification or relegation
1	Sarpsborg (O, P)	21	16	2	3	64	19	+45	34	Qualification for the promotion play-offs
2	Østsiden	21	12	3	6	46	27	+19	27	
3	Sparta (R)	21	11	4	6	43	32	+11	26	Qualification for the relegation play-offs
4	Rapid (R)	21	11	4	6	37	39	−2	26	Relegation to 3. divisjon
5	Pors (R)	21	7	4	10	36	43	−7	18	Relegation to 3. divisjon
6	Moss (R)	21	7	3	11	28	30	−2	17	Relegation to 3. divisjon
7	Fram (R)	21	5	5	11	34	42	−8	15	Relegation to 3. divisjon
8	Heddal (R)	21	1	3	17	14	70	−56	5	Relegation to 3. divisjon

Source: rsssf.no
Rules for classification: 1) points; 2) goal difference; 3) number of goals scored.
(O) Play-off winners; (P) Promoted; (R) Relegated

=== District Østland/Nordre ===
Pos	Team	Pld	W	D	L	GF	GA	GD	Pts	Qualification or relegation
1	Gjøvik-Lyn (O, P)	21	11	8	2	49	32	+17	30	Qualification for the promotion play-offs
2	Lillestrøm	21	11	5	5	60	47	+13	27	
3	Raufoss (O)	21	8	7	6	40	39	+1	23	Qualification for the relegation play-offs
4	Strømmen (R)	21	8	7	6	27	26	+1	23	Relegation to 3. divisjon
5	Asker (R)	21	8	3	10	48	33	+15	19	Relegation to 3. divisjon
6	Aurskog (R)	21	7	5	9	40	47	−7	19	Relegation to 3. divisjon
7	Mjøndalen (R)	21	7	1	13	47	57	−10	15	Relegation to 3. divisjon
8	Hamarkameratene (R)	21	4	4	13	31	61	−30	12	Relegation to 3. divisjon

Source: rsssf.no
Rules for classification: 1) points; 2) goal difference; 3) number of goals scored.
(O) Play-off winners; (P) Promoted; (R) Relegated

=== District Sørland/Vestland ===
==== Group A ====
Pos	Team	Pld	W	D	L	GF	GA	GD	Pts	Qualification or relegation
1	Start	21	14	5	2	67	27	+40	33	Qualification for the promotion play-offs
2	Jerv (R)	21	11	6	4	52	36	+16	28	Relegation to 3. divisjon
3	Grane (R)	21	7	10	4	51	50	+1	24	Relegation to 3. divisjon
4	Flekkefjord (R)	21	6	8	7	45	43	+2	20	Relegation to 3. divisjon
5	Vigør (R)	21	7	6	8	46	47	−1	20	Relegation to 3. divisjon
6	Sørfjell (R)	21	8	4	9	51	54	−3	20	Relegation to 3. divisjon
7	Vindbjart (R)	21	7	4	10	64	72	−8	18	Relegation to 3. divisjon
8	Nedenes (R)	21	1	3	17	33	80	−47	5	Relegation to 4. divisjon

Source: rsssf.no
Rules for classification: 1) points; 2) goal difference; 3) number of goals scored.
(R) Relegated

==== Group B ====
Pos	Team	Pld	W	D	L	GF	GA	GD	Pts	Qualification or relegation
1	Haugar	21	15	1	5	54	28	+26	31	Qualification for the promotion play-offs
2	Ulf (R)	21	14	1	6	49	21	+28	29	Relegation to 3. divisjon
3	Vard (R)	21	12	2	7	52	36	+16	26	Relegation to 3. divisjon
4	Bryne (R)	21	12	1	8	59	37	+22	25	Relegation to 3. divisjon
5	Jarl (R)	21	10	1	10	34	47	−13	21	Relegation to 3. divisjon
6	Stavanger (R)	21	7	3	11	31	34	−3	17	Relegation to 3. divisjon
7	Randaberg (R)	21	6	4	11	30	48	−18	16	Relegation to 3. divisjon
8	Buøy (R)	21	1	1	19	12	70	−58	3	Relegation to 4. divisjon

Source: rsssf.no
Rules for classification: 1) points; 2) goal difference; 3) number of goals scored.
(R) Relegated

==== Group C ====
Pos	Team	Pld	W	D	L	GF	GA	GD	Pts	Qualification or relegation
1	Os	18	13	3	2	39	14	+25	29	Qualification for the promotion play-offs
2	Djerv (R)	18	9	4	5	32	28	+4	22	Relegation to 3. divisjon
3	Årstad (R)	18	9	3	6	43	22	+21	21	Relegation to 3. divisjon
4	Varegg (R)	18	7	3	8	26	31	−5	17	Relegation to 3. divisjon
5	Trane (R)	18	5	5	8	20	32	−12	15	Relegation to 3. divisjon
6	Fana (R)	18	5	4	9	22	34	−12	14	Relegation to 3. divisjon
7	Nordnes (R)	18	1	6	11	14	35	−21	8	Relegation to 3. divisjon

Source: rsssf.no
Rules for classification: 1) points; 2) goal difference; 3) number of goals scored.
(R) Relegated

=== District Møre/Trøndelag ===
==== Møre ====
Pos	Team	Pld	W	D	L	GF	GA	GD	Pts	Qualification or relegation
1	Aalesund	21	16	3	2	51	16	+35	35	Qualification for the promotion play-offs
2	Langevåg (R)	21	13	4	4	65	31	+34	30	Relegation to 3. divisjon
3	Hødd (R)	21	13	3	5	66	30	+36	29	Relegation to 3. divisjon
4	Molde (R)	21	8	3	10	42	51	−9	19	Relegation to 3. divisjon
5	Kristiansund (R)	21	8	2	11	39	43	−4	18	Relegation to 3. divisjon
6	Clausenengen (R)	21	6	2	13	34	50	−16	14	Relegation to 3. divisjon
7	Braatt (R)	21	5	4	12	35	64	−29	14	Relegation to 3. divisjon
8	Skarbøvik (R)	21	4	1	16	31	78	−47	9	Relegation to 4. divisjon

Source: rsssf.no
Rules for classification: 1) points; 2) goal difference; 3) number of goals scored.
(R) Relegated

==== Trøndelag ====
Pos	Team	Pld	W	D	L	GF	GA	GD	Pts	Qualification or relegation
1	Kvik	21	14	3	4	45	17	+28	31	Qualification for the promotion play-offs
2	Freidig (R)	21	12	3	6	48	30	+18	27	Relegation to 3. divisjon
3	Nessegutten (R)	21	9	6	6	44	35	+9	24	Relegation to 3. divisjon
4	Brage (R)	21	8	7	6	40	34	+6	23	Relegation to 3. divisjon
5	Sverre (R)	21	9	2	10	36	41	−5	20	Relegation to 3. divisjon
6	Falken (R)	21	4	8	9	26	37	−11	16	Relegation to 3. divisjon
7	Ranheim (R)	21	8	0	13	36	52	−16	16	Relegation to 3. divisjon
8	Verdal (R)	21	4	3	14	32	61	−29	11	Relegation to 4. divisjon

Source: rsssf.no
Rules for classification: 1) points; 2) goal difference; 3) number of goals scored.
(R) Relegated

== Promotion play-offs ==
=== First round ===
Sørland/Vestland
Results

- Haugar 2–0 Start
- Start 2–4 Os
- Os Os 3–2 Haugar

Pos	Team	Pld	W	D	L	GF	GA	GD	Pts	Qualification
1	Os (O)	2	2	0	0	7	4	+3	4	Qualification for the promotion play-offs final round
2	Haugar	2	1	0	1	4	3	+1	2	Qualification for the 1963 2. divisjon
3	Start	2	0	0	2	2	6	−4	0	Qualification for the 1963 2. divisjon

Source: rsssf.no
Rules for classification: 1) points; 2) goal difference; 3) number of goals scored.
(O) Play-off winners

Møre/Trøndelag

- Kvik 0–0 Aalesund
- Aalesund 2–0 Kvik

Aalesund won 2–0 on aggregate and qualified for the final round.

=== Final round ===
Results

- Sarpsborg 2–0 Os
- Os 0–3 Sarpsborg

Sarpsborg won 5–0 on aggregate and were promoted to the 1. divisjon.

- Gjøvik-Lyn 1–1 Aalesund
- Aalesund 1–2 Gjøvik-Lyn

Gjøvik-Lyn won 3–2 on aggregate and were promoted to the 1. divisjon.

== Relegation play-offs ==
- Raufoss 4–0 Sparta
- Sparta 2–2 Raufoss

Raufoss won 6–2 on aggregate and remained in 2. divisjon. Sparta were relegated to the 3. divisjon.
