= 1960–61 Norwegian Main League =

17th season of top-tier football league in Norway

Hovedserien
- Season: 1960–61
- Champions: Fredrikstad; 9th title
- Relegated: Strømmen; Stavanger; Lillestrøm; Rapid
- European Cup: Fredrikstad

The 1960–61 Hovedserien was the 17th completed season of top division football in Norway.

== Overview ==
It was contested by 16 teams, and Fredrikstad won the championship, their second consecutive league title and ninth title overall.

== Teams and locations ==
Note: Table lists in alphabetical order.

Group A
Team	Ap.	Location
Fredrikstad	16	Fredrikstad
Larvik Turn	12	Larvik
Odd	14	Skien
Lisleby	5	Fredrikstad
Stavanger	4	Stavanger
Strømmen	11	Strømmen
Vålerengen	12	Oslo
Viking	16	Stavanger

Group B
Team	Ap.	Location
Eik	4	Tønsberg
Greåker	3	Sarpsborg
Lillestrøm	11	Lillestrøm
Lyn	9	Oslo
Rapid	5	Moss
Rosenborg	3	Trondheim
Sandefjord BK	15	Sandefjord
Skeid	15	Oslo

== League tables ==
=== Group A ===
Pos	Team	Pld	W	D	L	GF	GA	GD	Pts	Qualification or relegation
1	Fredrikstad (C)	14	10	2	2	43	21	+22	22	Qualification for the championship final
2	Vålerengen	14	6	2	6	24	17	+7	14	
3	Viking	14	5	4	5	24	24	0	14	
4	Larvik Turn	14	4	6	4	24	30	−6	14	
5	Odd	14	4	5	5	26	29	−3	13	
6	Lisleby	14	5	3	6	20	26	−6	13	
7	Strømmen (R)	14	3	5	6	16	22	−6	11	Relegation to Landsdelsserien
8	Stavanger (R)	14	3	5	6	15	23	−8	11	Relegation to Landsdelsserien

Source: RSSSF
(C) Champions; (R) Relegated

=== Group B ===
Pos	Team	Pld	W	D	L	GF	GA	GD	Pts	Qualification or relegation
1	Eik	14	8	2	4	35	21	+14	18	Qualification for the championship final
2	Lyn	14	7	3	4	41	27	+14	17	
3	Rosenborg	14	6	4	4	28	28	0	16	
4	Greåker	14	8	0	6	22	26	−4	16	
5	Sandefjord	14	6	2	6	34	32	+2	14	
6	Skeid	14	3	6	5	21	20	+1	12	
7	Lillestrøm (R)	14	4	3	7	29	33	−4	11	Relegation to Landsdelsserien
8	Rapid (R)	14	3	2	9	19	42	−23	8	Relegation to Landsdelsserien

Source: RSSSF
(R) Relegated

== Results ==
=== Group A ===
Home \ Away	FFK	LAR	LIS	ODD	STA	STR	VIF	VIK
Fredrikstad		1–2	5–2	4–1	5–1	3–0	2–1	4–1
Larvik Turn	2–2		0–2	2–1	0–0	1–1	1–2	4–2
Lisleby	1–4	1–3		2–2	1–2	1–1	1–0	1–0
Odd	3–4	5–3	1–1		1–1	2–0	0–0	2–2
Stavanger	0–0	2–2	2–1	2–4		0–2	1–2	0–1
Strømmen	0–1	2–2	2–3	5–2	1–1		0–1	0–4
Vålerengen	4–2	8–1	1–2	1–2	0–3	0–1		3–0
Viking	3–6	1–1	3–1	2–0	3–0	1–1	1–1	

Source: NIFS.no
Legend: Blue = home team win; Yellow = draw; Red = away team win.

=== Group B ===
Home \ Away	EIK	GRE	LIL	LYN	RAP	RBK	SBK	SKD
Eik		0–1	4–1	5–2	8–1	0–2	2–1	2–2
Greåker	1–0		4–2	1–3	2–1	3–2	0–3	2–0
Lillestrøm	1–2	3–0		0–3	5–1	2–2	4–0	0–3
Lyn	1–3	4–0	3–3		8–2	1–2	4–1	2–2
Rapid	2–3	2–1	2–1	2–3		0–1	2–1	1–3
Rosenborg	4–3	1–2	3–0	1–5	2–2		4–4	1–0
Sandefjord BK	1–2	4–3	5–5	3–0	3–0	5–2		0–4
Skeid	1–1	1–2	1–2	2–2	1–1	1–1	0–3	

Source: NIFS.no
Legend: Blue = home team win; Yellow = draw; Red = away team win.

== Championship final ==
- Fredrikstad 2–0 Eik

== Bronze final ==
- Vålerengen 6–4 Lyn
