= Øyestad IF =

Norwegian football club

- Full name: Øyestad Idrettsforening
- Founded: 1 April 1929
- Ground: Multicom Arena, Nedenes (football); Sør Amfi (handball)
- League: Fourth Division
- 2024: 1st (Fifth Division)

Øyestad Idrettsforening is a Norwegian multi-sports/alliance club from Arendal Municipality, originally founded in 1929 in Øyestad Municipality. The team colours are red and black.

It has sections for association football, team handball, orienteering, Nordic skiing and general sports for children.

== History ==
The club was founded on 1 April 1929 as Nedenes IL.

After the Second World War, Nedenes played in the Landsdelsserien, the second tier of men's football in Norway, in 1955–56, followed by a continuous spell from 1958–59 through 1961–62.

On 17 November 1963, Nedenes IL was merged with Nidarås IL, founded in 1946, and the new name Øyestad IF was taken.

The club is best known for its men's handball team, which competes under the moniker ØIF Arendal. Its elite status prompted Øyestad IF to become an alliance sports club in 2009, with the various sports as separate legal entities. The alliance consists of three legally and financially independent clubs and several smaller entities directly under the alliance. The board consists of the leaders of each club and smaller entity.

=== Current organisation ===
Øyestad IF Alliance consists of three legally and financially independent clubs plus some smaller groups:

- Øyestad IF fotball (football/soccer)
- Øyestad IF håndball (handball)
- Øyestad IF håndball elite (ØIF Arendal elite handball)
- several smaller groups directly under the alliance board

== Handball ==
After the men's team reached the elite series in 2009, they were split from the original handball club, forming a new club for this team ony. This new club got the name ØIF Arendal.

The remaining handball group has teams and players from boys/girls ages 8–9 all the way up to the senior level. As an independent sports club, their formal name is Øyestad IF håndball, or simply Øyestad. They play their home matches in Nedeneshallen.

The men's team plays division 2 (third level in Norway), and many of the young players are in the ØIF Arendal roster. The women's team play division 5 – in Arendal, the women’s handball development program is organized under IK Grane.

Since 2024, the club also has a team for wheelchair handball.

== Football ==
Øyestad IF fotball has teams for all ages, including a men's veteran team. Their slogan is As many as possible – for as long as possible.

In the 1990s, Øyestad bounced between the Second Division in 1992, Third Division in 1993–1994, Second in 1995, Third in 1996–1997, Fourth in 1998 and Third in 1999–2000. In the cup, the team reached the second round in 1992, third round in 1993, first round in 1994 and 1995.

In 2000, Øyestad IF took part in a large merger of the football teams in Arendal, forming FK Arendal. This new club replaced Øyestad in the league system from the 2001 season, and Øyestad IF Football started fresh from Sixth Division. The men's football team currently plays in the Fourth Division, the fifth tier of football in Norway.

The women's football team currently (2025) plays in the Fifth Division.
