= 1952–53 Norwegian Main League =

9th season of top-tier football league in Norway

Hovedserien
- Season: 1952–53
- Champions: Larvik Turn; 1st title
- Relegated: Brann; Årstad; Lyn; Ranheim

The 1952–53 Hovedserien was the 9th completed season of top division football in Norway.

== Overview ==
16 teams competed. Larvik Turn & IF won the championship, their first league title.

== Teams and locations ==
Note: Table lists in alphabetical order.

Group A
Team	Ap.	Location
Årstad	5	Bergen
Brann	7	Bergen
Fredrikstad	8	Fredrikstad
Sarpsborg FK	8	Sarpsborg
Skeid	7	Oslo
Strømmen	4	Strømmen
Varegg	1	Bergen
Viking	8	Stavanger

Group B
Team	Ap.	Location
Asker	2	Asker
Larvik Turn	4	Larvik
Lillestrøm	3	Lillestrøm
Lyn	8	Oslo
Odd	6	Skien
Ranheim	5	Trondheim
Sandefjord BK	7	Sandefjord
Sparta	6	Sarpsborg

== League tables ==
=== Group A ===
Pos	Team	Pld	W	D	L	GF	GA	GD	Pts	Qualification or relegation
1	Skeid	14	10	3	1	48	10	+38	23	Qualification for the championship final
2	Fredrikstad	14	7	4	3	40	19	+21	18	
3	Sarpsborg FK	14	7	4	3	20	17	+3	18	
4	Viking	14	7	3	4	23	17	+6	17	
5	Strømmen	14	6	3	5	30	21	+9	15	
6	Varegg	14	3	2	9	16	39	−23	8	
7	Brann (R)	14	2	3	9	9	36	−27	7	Relegation
8	Årstad (R)	14	2	2	10	11	38	−27	6	Relegation

Source: RSSSF
(R) Relegated

=== Group B ===
Pos	Team	Pld	W	D	L	GF	GA	GD	Pts	Qualification or relegation
1	Larvik Turn (C)	14	10	2	2	44	11	+33	22	Qualification for the championship final
2	Asker	14	6	7	1	20	14	+6	19	
3	Lillestrøm	14	6	4	4	25	22	+3	16	
4	Sandefjord BK	14	6	3	5	25	32	−7	15	
5	Odd	14	5	3	6	34	30	+4	13	
6	Sparta	14	5	2	7	15	22	−7	12	
7	Lyn (R)	14	3	2	9	24	31	−7	8	Relegation
8	Ranheim (R)	14	3	1	10	12	37	−25	7	Relegation

Source: RSSSF
(C) Champions; (R) Relegated

== Results ==
=== Group A ===
Home \ Away	ÅRS	SKB	FRE	SAR	SKD	STR	VAR	VIK
Årstad		0–1	3–2	0–0	0–2	0–4	0–1	1–2
Brann	0–0		1–8	1–1	1–7	0–2	1–1	0–3
Fredrikstad	7–2	2–0		2–2	2–2	2–1	7–0	2–1
Sarpsborg FK	3–1	3–0	0–1		1–0	1–0	2–1	1–3
Skeid	5–0	2–0	3–3	4–0		8–1	5–0	1–0
Strømmen	6–0	4–1	1–1	2–3	0–0		4–0	0–0
Varegg	3–4	1–2	1–0	1–2	1–6	3–2		2–3
Viking	2–0	2–1	2–1	1–1	1–3	2–3	1–1	

Source: NIFS.no
Legend: Blue = home team win; Yellow = draw; Red = away team win.

=== Group B ===
Home \ Away	ASK	LAR	LIL	LYN	ODD	RAN	SBK	SPA
Asker		0–0	2–2	2–2	2–1	2–0	1–0	0–0
Larvik Turn	1–1		4–0	4–0	3–2	6–0	12–0	3–0
Lillestrøm	1–1	2–0		2–0	2–2	3–1	2–0	1–0
Lyn	0–1	5–1	0–0		2–3	6–2	1–3	2–3
Odd	1–3	1–3	7–1	2–4		1–1	2–2	4–2
Ranheim	0–2	0–1	0–6	1–0	2–4		0–4	4–0
Sandefjord BK	3–3	0–4	3–2	4–1	3–2	2–0		1–1
Sparta	3–0	0–2	2–1	3–1	0–2	0–1	1–0	

Source: NIFS.no
Legend: Blue = home team win; Yellow = draw; Red = away team win.

== Championship final ==
- Larvik Turn 3–2 Skeid
