= John Krogh =

Norwegian footballer (1938–2019)

Personal information
- Full name: John Olav Krogh
- Date of birth: 12 September 1938
- Place of birth: Trondheim, Norway
- Date of death: 18 January 2019 (aged 80)
- Position: Forward

Senior career*
Years	Team	Apps	(Gls)
1957–1960	SK Freidig		
1961–1963	Rosenborg BK		

International career
1962–1963	Norway	11	(4)
- * Club domestic league appearances and goals

John Olav Krogh (12 September 1938 – 18 January 2019) was a Norwegian footballer who played as a forward.

Born in Trondheim, he played for SK Freidig (1957–60) and Rosenborg BK (1961–63).

He earned 11 caps for Norway, scoring four goals. He made his debut for them on 21 June 1962 in a 0–2 loss to neighbours Sweden at the Ullevaal Stadion in Oslo, in the first leg of the preliminary round of qualification for the 1964 European Nations' Cup. In his next game on 3 July, he scored his first international goal, the third of a 5–0 friendly win over Malta in his hometown. On 4 November, in the second leg at the Malmö Stadion, he opened a 1–1 draw that sent the Swedes through 3–1 on aggregate.
