= 1957–58 Norwegian Main League =

14th season of top-tier football league in Norway

Hovedserien
- Season: 1957–58
- Champions: Viking; 1st title
- Relegated: Frigg; Sparta; Molde; Steinkjer

The 1957–58 Hovedserien was the 14th completed season of top division football in Norway.

== Overview ==
It was contested by 16 teams, and Viking won the championship, their first league title.

== Teams and locations ==
Note: Table lists in alphabetical order.

Group A
Team	Ap.	Location
Brann	10	Bergen
Frigg	6	Oslo
Larvik Turn	9	Larvik
Odd	11	Skien
Raufoss	4	Raufoss
Sparta	10	Sarpsborg
Strømmen	8	Strømmen
Viking	13	Stavanger

Group B
Team	Ap.	Location
Asker	7	Asker
Eik	1	Tønsberg
Fredrikstad	13	Fredrikstad
Lillestrøm	8	Lillestrøm
Molde	2	Molde
Sandefjord BK	12	Sandefjord
Skeid	12	Oslo
Steinkjer	4	Steinkjer

== League tables ==
=== Group A ===
Pos	Team	Pld	W	D	L	GF	GA	GD	Pts	Qualification or relegation
1	Viking (C)	14	9	3	2	32	14	+18	21	Qualification for the championship final
2	Larvik Turn	14	9	3	2	36	22	+14	21	
3	Strømmen	14	8	2	4	29	16	+13	18	
4	Brann	14	8	1	5	26	28	−2	17	
5	Raufoss	14	7	0	7	35	30	+5	14	
6	Odd	14	7	0	7	30	26	+4	14	
7	Frigg (R)	14	3	0	11	20	38	−18	6	Relegation to Landsdelsserien
8	Sparta (R)	14	0	1	13	10	44	−34	1	Relegation to Landsdelsserien

Source: RSSSF
(C) Champions; (R) Relegated

=== Group B ===
Pos	Team	Pld	W	D	L	GF	GA	GD	Pts	Qualification or relegation
1	Skeid	14	11	1	2	41	13	+28	23	Qualification for the championship final
2	Fredrikstad	14	9	3	2	45	18	+27	21	
3	Asker	14	6	5	3	36	26	+10	17	
4	Sandefjord	14	5	5	4	16	16	0	15	
5	Lillestrøm	14	6	1	7	34	32	+2	13	
6	Eik	14	5	3	6	22	27	−5	13	
7	Molde (R)	14	1	5	8	18	38	−20	7	Relegation to Landsdelsserien
8	Steinkjer (R)	14	1	1	12	17	59	−42	3	Relegation to Landsdelsserien

Source: RSSSF
(R) Relegated

== Results ==
=== Group A ===
Home \ Away	SKB	FRI	LAR	ODD	RAU	SPA	STR	VIK
Brann		1–0	3–3	3–1	1–0	5–0	3–2	1–3
Frigg	2–3		2–3	5–1	0–2	4–1	1–4	0–2
Larvik Turn	3–2	3–0		0–1	5–2	4–0	2–1	2–1
Odd	6–0	7–2	3–1		2–3	2–0	1–2	1–2
Raufoss	1–2	4–1	1–3	0–3		7–2	2–1	1–2
Sparta	1–2	0–2	2–3	1–2	2–4		0–1	1–1
Strømmen	5–0	2–0	1–1	5–0	2–6	1–0		0–0
Viking	1–0	5–1	3–3	2–0	4–2	6–0	0–2	

Source: NIFS.no
Legend: Blue = home team win; Yellow = draw; Red = away team win.

=== Group B ===
Home \ Away	ASK	EIK	FFK	LIL	MOL	SBK	SKD	SFK
Asker		1–1	5–2	3–1	3–3	0–0	2–2	6–1
Eik	4–0		1–2	2–0	3–1	0–0	0–4	4–2
Fredrikstad	3–1	4–1		4–3	6–1	1–0	1–2	9–0
Lillestrøm	2–6	3–1	2–2		4–0	3–1	1–3	4–2
Molde	1–1	1–3	1–1	0–3		1–1	0–4	5–2
Sandefjord BK	1–2	0–0	0–0	5–2	2–1		2–1	3–1
Skeid	3–1	7–2	1–2	2–1	2–0	4–0		3–1
Steinkjer	2–5	2–0	0–8	1–5	3–3	0–1	0–3	

Source: NIFS.no
Legend: Blue = home team win; Yellow = draw; Red = away team win.

== Championship final ==
- Viking 2–0 Skeid
