= 1963 Norwegian Second Division =

2. divisjon
- Season: 1963
- Champions: Sandefjord BK (Group A); Raufoss (Group B)
- Promoted: Sandefjord BK; Raufoss
- Relegated: Larvik Turn; Os; Aalesund; Lisleby

The 1963 2. divisjon was the first Norwegian national second-tier football league season.

The league was contested by 16 teams, divided into two groups; A and B. The winners of group A and B were promoted to the 1964 1. divisjon. The two lowest placed teams in both groups were relegated to the 3. divisjon.

== Overview ==
=== Summary ===
Sandefjord BK won group A with 24 points. Raufoss won group B with 21 points. Both teams were promoted to the 1964 1. divisjon.

== Tables ==
=== Group A ===
Pos	Team	Pld	W	D	L	GF	GA	GD	Pts	Promotion, qualification or relegation
1	Sandefjord BK (C, P)	14	11	2	1	38	13	+25	24	Promotion to First Division
2	Eik	14	8	4	2	30	18	+12	20	
3	Start	14	8	1	5	26	23	+3	17	
4	Haugar	14	7	1	6	33	29	+4	15	
5	Odd	14	4	3	7	27	27	0	11	
6	Ørn	14	4	3	7	22	26	−4	11	
7	Larvik Turn (R)	14	3	4	7	17	21	−4	10	Relegation to Third Division
8	Os (R)	14	2	0	12	13	49	−36	4	Relegation to Third Division

Source: rsssf.no
Rules for classification: 1) points; 2) goal difference; 3) number of goals scored.
(C) Champions; (P) Promoted; (R) Relegated

=== Group B ===
Pos	Team	Pld	W	D	L	GF	GA	GD	Pts	Promotion, qualification or relegation
1	Raufoss (C, P)	14	10	1	3	30	19	+11	21	Promotion to First Division
2	Lillestrøm	14	8	4	2	41	26	+15	20	
3	Rosenborg	14	6	4	4	36	23	+13	16	
4	Østsiden	14	7	2	5	37	30	+7	16	
5	Greåker	14	5	2	7	19	26	−7	12	
6	Kvik	14	3	5	6	16	22	−6	11	
7	Aalesund (R)	14	4	2	8	11	24	−13	10	Relegation to Third Division
8	Lisleby (R)	14	2	2	10	17	37	−20	6	Relegation to Third Division

Source: rsssf.no
Rules for classification: 1) points; 2) goal difference; 3) number of goals scored.
(C) Champions; (P) Promoted; (R) Relegated
