= Jan Sagvaag =

Norwegian footballer (1926-2014)

Jan Martin Sagvaag (20 October 1926 - 7 March 2014) was a Norwegian footballer.

He played club football for Årstad IL, which had spells on the highest tier, the Main League, in the 1950s. Sagvaag started the international against Yugoslavia in June 1952, and scored Norway's only goal in the 1-4 loss. However, he was not capped again. He died in 2014.
