= SK Wing =

Norwegian sports club

Logo.

Sportsklubben Wing is a Norwegian sports club from Øya, Trondheim, founded on 24 August 1924. Formerly a multi-sports club, in 1993 SK Wing became an umbrella team for various independent sports sections.

The children's club Fremad was founded on 24 August 1924, practising association football. On 13 May 1935 it was merged with Kampørn (founded 1928) to form SK Wing. Their sports codes became football, track and field, ice hockey, weightlifting and from 1938 orienteering. Among their members was Ernst Larsen.

In the 1980s, Wing also had a successful handball team for men. Among the players was Morten Schønfeldt. In 1993, the different sport codes were demerged into independent sections. Most went defunct, but the orienteering club lived on as Wing OK, and Wing Hockey became among Norway's leading ice hockey teams for women.

Wing OK co-hosted the 2010 World Orienteering Championships.
