= Flekkefjord FK =

Norwegian football club

- Full name: Flekkefjord Fotballklubb
- Founded: 31 March 1905
- Ground: Uenes stadion, Flekkefjord
- League: Fourth Division
- 2024: 4th

Flekkefjord Fotballklubb is a Norwegian association football club based in the town of Flekkefjord in Flekkefjord Municipality, Agder county, Norway.

Founded on 31 March 1905, it is the oldest exclusively football club in Southern Norway and the only one founded before the dissolution of the union between Norway and Sweden. The team colours are red and black.

The men's football team currently plays in the Fourth Division, the fifth tier of football in Norway, as does the women's team.

Before the Second World War, Flekkefjord FK played in the League of Norway. After the war, the league was resumed in 1947–48 which ended in relegation for Flekkefjord. Flekkefjord FK played in the Landsdelsserien, the second tier of Norway, as long as the Landsdelsserien existed, from the 1951–52 season through the 1961–62 season. The team notably lost in a playoff to the highest tier three years in a row. Winning the Southern Norway group in 1952, 1953 and 1954, all three playoffs ended with promotion for Bergen-based teams: Varegg, Nordnes and Brann.

Flekkefjord FK had notable cup runs in 1938 (third round, lost to Odd), 1949 (third round, lost to Brann), 1953 (third round, lost to Viking), 1968 (fourth round, lost 9–0 to Lyn), and 1969 (third round, lost to Mjøndalen).

In more recent times, Flekkefjord lost to Start in 1989 (first round), 1992 (first round) and 1997 (second round); to Viking in 1994 (second round) and 2012 (first round); to Brann in 1996 (second round); to Bryne in 1999 (first round) and to Fana in 1995 (second round).

Throughout the 1990s, Flekkefjord FK was a mainstay in the Second Division until its relegation in 2000. In the 2003 Third Division they faced further relegation, followed by another Third Division spell in 2006 and 2007.

On 18 September 2007, it was decided to attempt to make an elite team Lister FK in Western Agder, comprising Flekkefjord FK and Kvinesdal IL. The merger was discontinued in February 2011.
