= IK Grane =

Norwegian multi-sports club

- Full name: Idrettsklubben Grane
- Founded: 10 February 1902
- Ground: Norac stadion, Arendal
- League: Division 5

Idrettsklubben Grane is a Norwegian multi-sports club from Arendal. It has sections for association football, team handball, athletics and orienteering.

The club was founded on 10 February 1902 and named after Grani of Norse mythology.

The men's football team was a contender on national level before the Second World War, playing a number of seasons in the League of Norway. In the 1947–48 League of Norway, which was the last edition of the competition before the advent of the Main League, Grane failed to qualify for the Main League. Grane spent most of the 1950s in the Landsdelsserien, until its discontinuation in 1962, when Grane once again failed to qualify for the new Second Division.

In the early 1990s, the men's football team played in the Third Division until 1993. The club participated in the short-lived cooperation project FK Arendal. Grane returned to the Third Division with two stints from 2004 to 2007 and 2009 to 2010.

In 2010, Grane was ready to form another cooperation team, this time together with IF Trauma of Tromøya. On 27 September 2010, they founded Arendal Fotball. For several years after that, Grane did not field a senior team. A men's football team was refounded. As of 2024, it plays in the Fifth Division, the sixth tier of Norwegian football.

The women's handball team played intermittently in the First Division, the second tier of Norwegian handball.

Individual sportspeople include athlete Hans Olav Uldal and orienteer Jørgen Rostrup.
