= IL Sørfjell =

Norwegian sports club

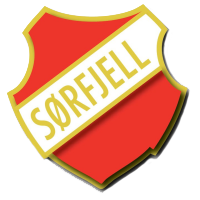
- Full name: Idrettslaget Sørfjell
- Founded: 16 April 1916
- Ground: Gressbanen, Eydehavn; Stuenes stadion, Saltrød
Home colours

Idrettslaget Sørfjell is a Norwegian sports club from Eydehavn. It has sections for association football, athletics, team handball, ice hockey, floorball and beach volleyball.

It was founded on 16 April 1916 as Eydehavn IF. In 1934 it merged with the club IL Fjell from Saltrød. In 1945 it merged with the workers' sports club Stokken AIL and took the name Fjell/Stokken. It was later changed to IL Sørfjell. In 1953 it had no sections for floorball, volleyball or hockey, but had sections for Nordic skiing and speed skating.

The men's football team currently plays in the Fifth Division, the sixth tier of Norwegian football. It played in the Fourth Division as late as in 2008, and in the Third Division as late as in 2005. Before that they had a Third Division streak from 1992 to 1999.
