= IL Varegg =

Norwegian sports club

Home colours

Idrettslaget Varegg is a sports club in Bergen. It has sections for football, orienteering, cross-country skiing and track and field.

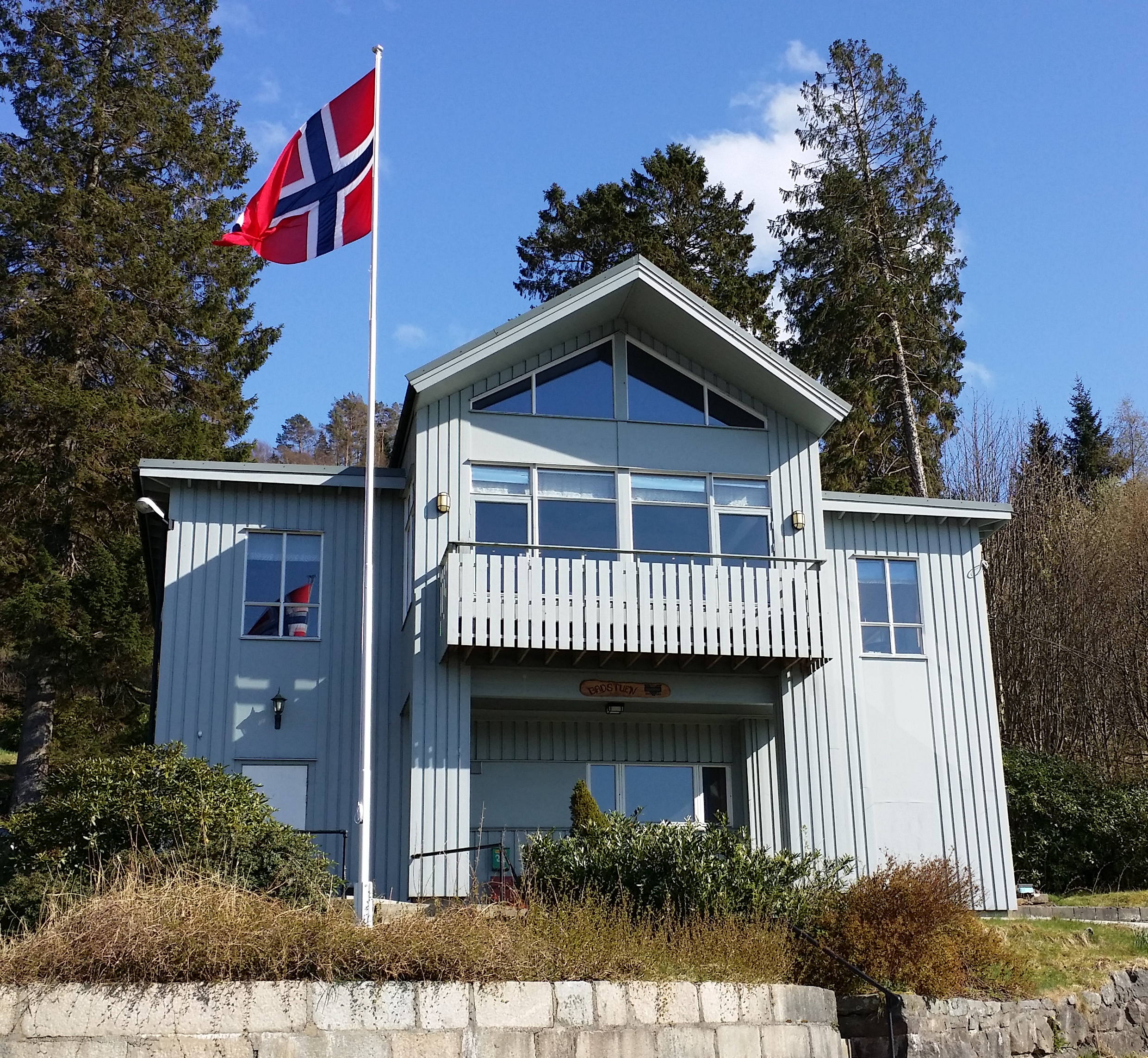
'Badstuen', the club house of Varegg

The club hosts 'Stoltzekleiven Opp', an annual fell running race up the mountain Sandviksfjellet.

== History ==
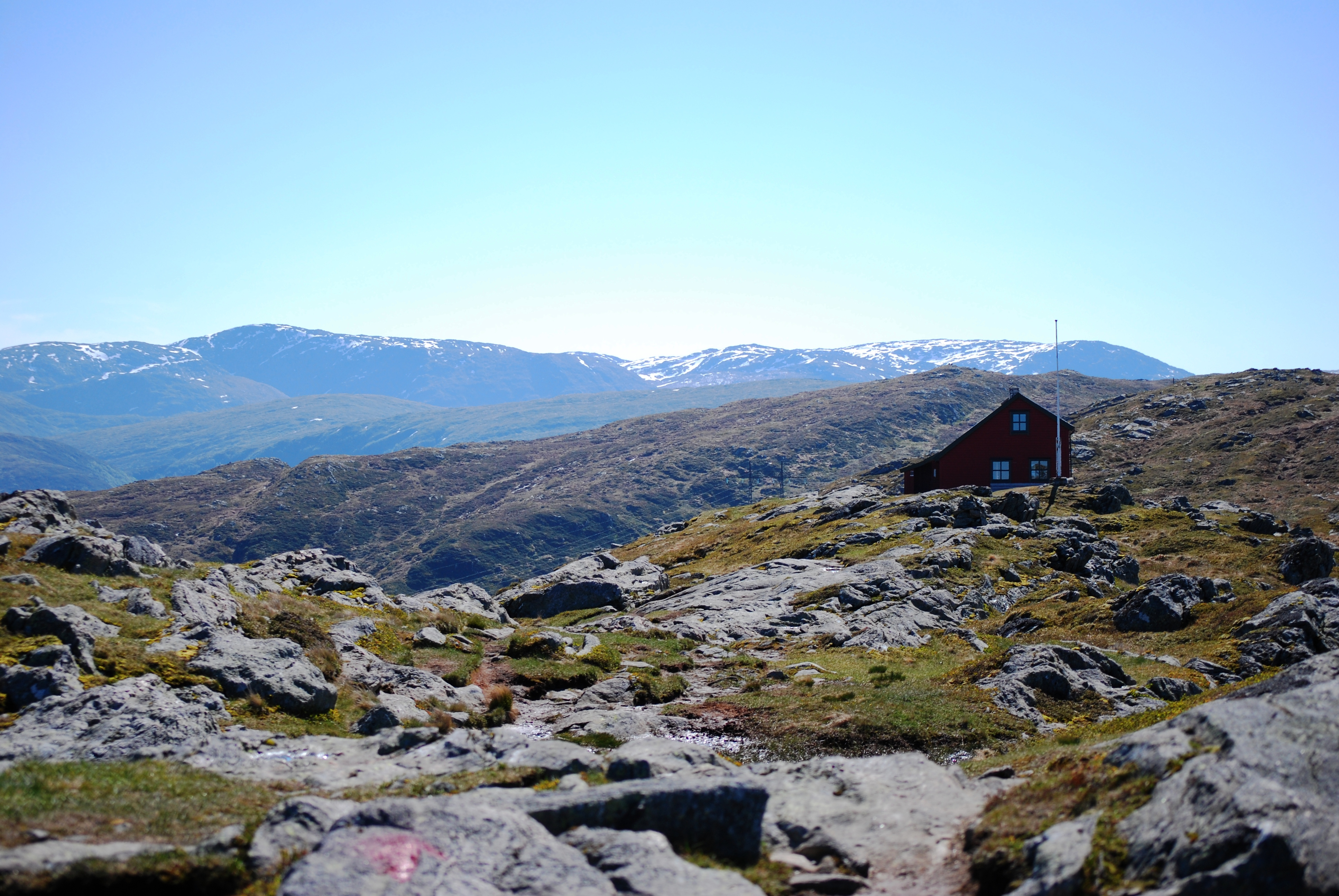
The mountain Vardegga (front), with the shack Vikinghytten.

The club was founded as 'Falk' in 1921, but applied to change its name to 'Sparta' in 1925. The new name was not accepted by Norges Idrettsforbund, and the members chose the name Pallas instead. In 1947, Pallas merged with 'Høydekameratene' and was renamed to Varegg, after the mountain Vardegga.

Varegg played in the top division of Norwegian football for three seasons in the 1950s, attracting average crowds of about 6,000. Their best finish was 6th in Group A in 1952/53, ahead of local rivals SK Brann and Årstad IL, who were relegated. Varegg were narrowly relegated in the 1955/56 season though beating rivals Brann in both games, and have not played in the top flight since.

In the 1971 Norwegian Football Cup Varegg reached the quarter-finals, and attracted a crowd of more than 20,000 at Krohnsminde against eventual winners Rosenborg BK. Varegg lost the match 0–1. Eleven years later, in 1982, an infamous 1–9 loss at home against Brann in the last round of the 1982 league season saw Brann promoted to the top tier on goal difference, ahead of Steinkjer I&FK, who suspected foul play between the two Bergen clubs.

Varegg played three seasons in the Norwegian second tier division in the 1980s. Until the rise of suburban teams such as Fyllingen, Åsane, Fana and Løv-Ham in the late 1980s, Varegg was recognized as the second best club in Bergen, after Brann.

Varegg have since played in lower divisions. As of 2026, they play in the 3 division group 3.
