= Langevåg IL =

Norwegian sports club

- Full name: Langevåg Idrettslag
- Short name: LIL
- Founded: 1920
- Ground: Langevåg Stadion
- League: 4. divisjon
- 2019: 5. divisjon (Sunnmøre), 1st of 12; (promoted)
Home colours

Langevåg Idrettslag is a sports club located in Langevåg in Sula Municipality, Norway. It has sections for association football, team handball and electric floorball.

== Football ==
Langevåg played their first game on Langevåg Stadion in 1921. In 1961, the team played play-offs for promotion to Hovedserien, the Norwegian top division, but lost 3–4 on aggregate against Steinkjer. 7,700 spectators attended the home game, which is the attendance record at Langevåg Stadion.

The men's football team currently plays in 4. divisjon, the fifth tier of the Norwegian football league system, since their promotion from the sixth tier in 2019. They last played in the 2. divisjon (third tier) in 2002 and 2003.

Norwegian international, Cecilie Fiskerstrand has played for the club.

=== Recent seasons ===
Season		Pos.	Pl.	W	D	L	GS	GA	P	Cup	Notes	Ref.
2012	4. divisjon	↓ 12	22	5	3	14	28	48	18	dnq	Relegated to 5. divisjon	
2013	5. divisjon	↑ 1	18	15	3	0	67	23	48	dnq	Promoted to 4. divisjon	
2014	4. divisjon	9	22	7	6	9	37	50	27	dnq		
2015	4. divisjon	9	22	7	5	10	49	50	26	dnq		
2016	4. divisjon	2	22	13	5	4	68	29	44	dnq		
2017	4. divisjon	↓ 11	22	6	1	15	31	64	19	First qualifying round	Relegated to 5. divisjon	
2018	5. divisjon	3	22	13	5	4	69	31	44	dnq		
2019	5. divisjon	↑ 1	22	15	3	4	72	33	48	dnq	Promoted to 4. divisjon	
