= Os TF =

Norwegian sports club

Os Turnforening
- Founded: 1919
- Ground: Kuventræ Stadion, Os
- Manager: Endre Brenne
- League: 3. divisjon
- 2024: 3. divisjon group 1, 3rd of 14
Home colours	Away colours

Os Turnforening is a multi-sports club from Osøyro in Bjørnafjorden Municipality, Norway. It has sections for association football, team handball, gymnastics and track and field.

== General history ==
The club was founded in 1905. The football section is semi-independent and counts 1919 as its founding year.

== Football ==
The men's football team the club has played once, the 1975 season, in the top tier of Norwegian football, then known as the 1. divisjon. The team plays at Kuventræ Stadion and in the 3. divisjon. It last played in the 2. divisjon in 2010. The club's manager is the retired defender of the Hungary national team, Zsolt Korcsmár .
