= List of SK Brann seasons =

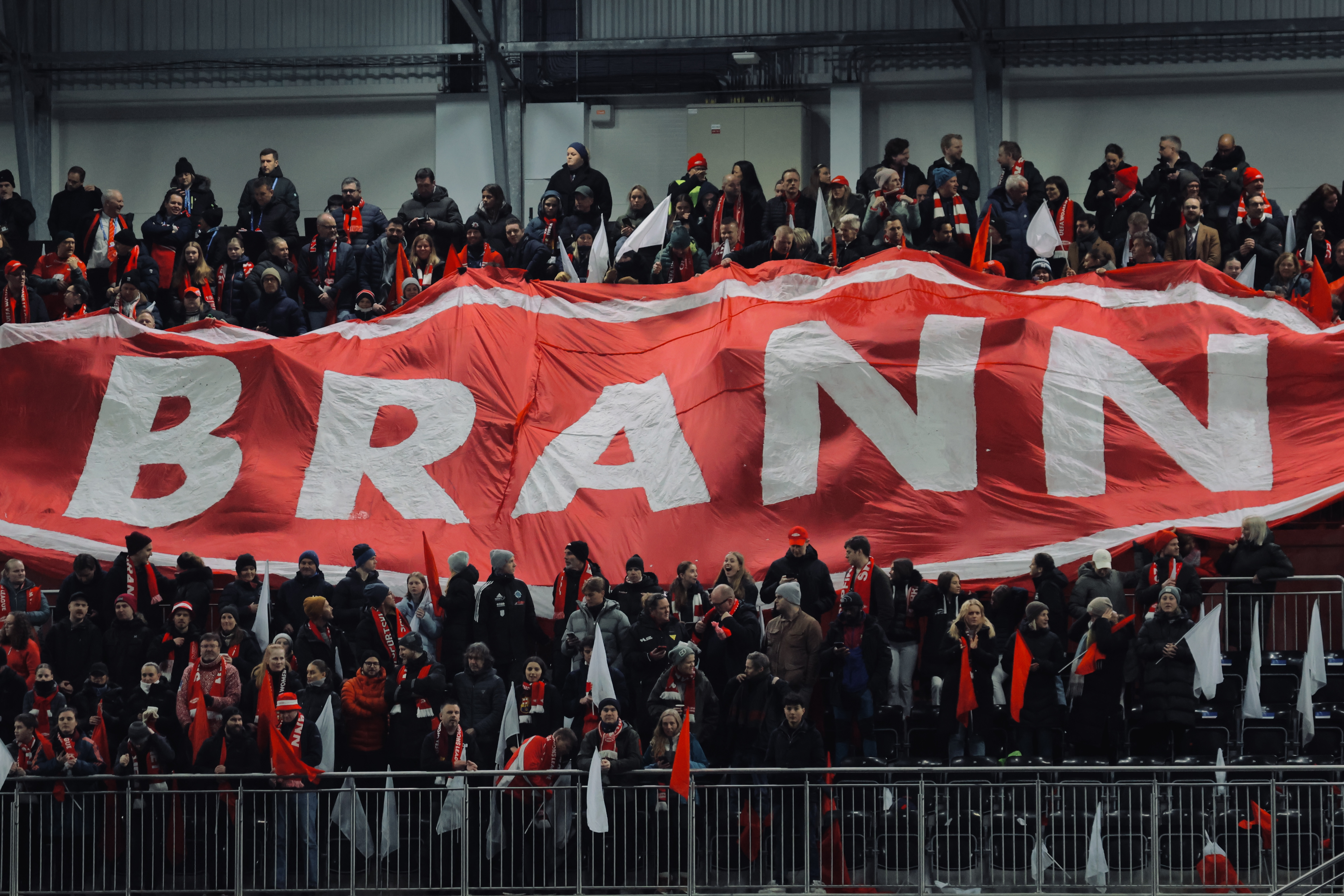
Brann supporters with a tifo during the home leg against Barcelona in the 2023–24 UEFA Women's Champions League quarter-finals.

SK Brann is a Norwegian football club from Bergen, Norway. The club was founded in 1908 and is one of the most popular in Norway. They have won Eliteserien three times, and the Norwegian Football Cup seven times. As of 2025 Brann have played in the top tier of Norwegian football for 68 seasons, the second most of any club. Since 2022 Brann have had a women's team playing in Toppserien.

== Key ==
- Pld = Matches played
- W = Matches won
- D = Matches drawn
- L = Matches lost
- GF = Goals for
- GA = Goals against
- Pts = Points
- Pos = Final position
- QR = Qualifying round
- Q1 = First qualifying round
- Q2 = Second qualifying round
- Q3 = Third qualifying round
- PO = Play-off round
- GS2 = Second group stage
- LP = League phase
- R1 = Round 1
- R2 = Round 2
- R3 = Round 3
- R4 = Round 4
- R32 = Round of 32
- QF = Quarter-finals
- SF = Semi-finals

| Winners | Runners-up | Third place | Promoted | Relegated | Top scorer in Brann's division ♦ |

== Men's team ==
=== Regional league era (1911–1937) ===
Results of league and cup competitions by season
| Season | League | | | | | | | | | Cup |
| Season | Division | Pld | W | D | L | GF | GA | Pts | Pos | Cup |
|---|---|---|---|---|---|---|---|---|---|---|
| 1911 | Kretsserien | 6 | 4 | 1 | 1 | 28 | 11 | 9 | 2nd | — |
| 1912 | Kretsserien | 3 | 2 | 0 | 1 | 17 | 4 | 4 | 1st | — |
| 1913 | Kretsserien | 4 | 3 | 1 | 0 | 17 | 5 | 7 | 1st | R1 |
| 1914 | Kretsserien | 4 | 4 | 0 | 0 | 25 | 2 | 6 | 1st | R2 |
| 1915 | Kretsserien | 6 | 5 | 1 | 0 | 30 | 9 | 11 | 1st | R2 |
| 1916 | Kretsserien | 6 | 6 | 0 | 0 | 30 | 7 | 12 | 1st | R1 |
| 1917 | Kretsserien | 2 | 2 | 0 | 0 | 4 | 23 | 0 | 1st | Runners-up |
| 1918 | Kretsserien | 6 | 6 | 0 | 0 | 31 | 1 | 12 | 1st | Runners-up |
| 1919 | Kretsserien | 2 | 2 | 0 | 0 | 22 | 1 | 4 | 1st | R2 |
| 1920 | Kretsserien | 3 | 3 | 0 | 0 | 9 | 0 | 6 | 1st | QF |
| 1921 | Kretsserien | 3 | 3 | 0 | 0 | 19 | 4 | 6 | 1st | SF |
| 1922 | Kretsserien | 3 | 3 | 0 | 0 | 9 | 3 | 6 | 1st | R4 |
| 1923 | Kretsserien | 3 | 3 | 0 | 0 | 14 | 1 | 6 | 1st | Winners |
| 1924 | Kretsserien | 3 | 2 | 0 | 1 | 11 | 0 | 4 | 1st | SF |
| 1925 | Kretsserien | 3 | 2 | 0 | 1 | 5 | 3 | 4 | 2nd | Winners |
| 1926 | Kretsserien | 3 | 3 | 0 | 0 | 12 | 2 | 6 | 1st | QF |
| 1927 | Kretsserien | 8 | 8 | 0 | 0 | 59 | 11 | 16 | 1st | QF |
| 1928 | Kretsserien | 5 | 4 | 0 | 1 | 29 | 8 | 8 | 1st | QF |
| 1929 | Kretsserien | 5 | 4 | 0 | 1 | 21 | 4 | 8 | 1st | QF |
| 1930 | Kretsserien | 5 | 4 | 0 | 1 | 25 | 4 | 8 | 1st (Note: Ended equal on points with Djerv and Hardy, who they beat in play-off matches for the championship.) | R2 |
| 1931 | Kretsserien | 5 | 4 | 0 | 1 | 17 | 4 | 8 | 2nd | QF |
| 1932 | Kretsserien | 5 | 4 | 0 | 1 | 23 | 3 | 8 | 1st (Note: Ended equal on points with Hardy, who they beat in a play-off match for the championship.) | R3 |
| 1933 | Kretsserien | 5 | 3 | 2 | 0 | 12 | 5 | 8 | 2nd | R4 |
| 1934 | Kretsserien | 5 | 5 | 0 | 0 | 23 | 2 | 10 | 1st | R2 |
| 1935 | Kretsserien | 7 | 6 | 0 | 1 | 28 | 6 | 12 | 1st | R2 |
| 1936 | Kretsserien | 6 | 4 | 1 | 1 | 23 | 4 | 9 | 2nd | R2 |
| 1937 | Kretsserien | 6 | 4 | 1 | 1 | 10 | 7 | 9 | 1st | R3 |

=== National league era (1937–present) ===
Results of league and cup competitions by season
| Season | League | | | | | | | | | | Cup | UEFA / Other | | Top goalscorer(s) (Note: Goals in all competitions are counted.) | |
| Season | Division | Tier | Pld | W | D | L | GF | GA | Pts | Pos | Cup | Competition | Result | Player(s) | Goals |
|---|---|---|---|---|---|---|---|---|---|---|---|---|---|---|---|
| 1937–38 | Norgesserien (VI) | 1 | 10 | 5 | 2 | 3 | 31 | 21 | 12 | 2nd | R3 | N/A (Note: Norwegian teams were not invited to join European competition until the 1960–61 European Cup.) | | (Norway) Tom Faye | 9 |
| 1938–39 | Norgesserien (VI) | 1 | 10 | 4 | 2 | 4 | 14 | 18 | 10 | 3rd | R1 | N/A | | (Norway) Reidar Zahl | 5 |
| 1939–40 | Norgesserien (VI) (Note: The 1939–40 Norgesserien was abandoned following the German invasion of Norway.) | 1 | 7 | 3 | 0 | 4 | 15 | 16 | 6 | 3rd | R4 | N/A | | (Norway) Leiv Naustdal (Norway) Finn Strøm-Erichsen (Norway) Reidar Zahl | 5 |
No competitive football was played between 1940 and 1945 due to World War II
| 1945 | Kretsserien (Note: The 1945 season only saw competitive football played at the regional level.) | N/A | 6 | 3 | 2 | 1 | 11 | 4 | 8 | 3rd | R2 | N/A | | (Norway) Sigurd Zachariassen (Norway) Reidar Zahl | 4 (Note: Goalscoring data for the 1945 season is incomplete.) |
| 1946–47 | Norgesserien qualifiers↑ (Note: Due to the long break caused by World War II, the 1946–47 season saw the 20 different regional footballing associations host qualifiers for the 1947–48 Norgesserien.) | N/A | 14 | 9 | 3 | 2 | 53 | 15 | 21 | 1st | R4 | N/A | | (Norway) Gunnar Skagen | 22 |
| 1947–48 | Norgesserien (VI) | 1 | 10 | 9 | 1 | 0 | 38 | 5 | 19 | 1st (Note: Knocked out by Viking in the quarter-finals of the championship play-offs.) | QF | N/A | | (Norway) Sigurd Zachariassen | 17 |
| 1948–49 | Hovedserien (A)↓ | 1 | 14 | 1 | 2 | 11 | 25 | 43 | 4 | 8th | R4 | N/A | | (Norway) Gunnar Skagen | 9 |
| 1949–50 | First Division (VI)↑ | 2 | 10 | 8 | 0 | 2 | 39 | 14 | 16 | 1st | R4 | N/A | | (Norway) Gunnar Skagen | 20 |
| 1950–51 | Hovedserien (A) | 1 | 14 | 5 | 3 | 6 | 24 | 30 | 13 | 5th | Runners-up | N/A | | (Norway) Gunnar Skagen | 17 |
| 1951–52 | Hovedserien (A) | 1 | 14 | 8 | 1 | 5 | 27 | 21 | 17 | 1st (Note: Lost the championship final against Fredrikstad.) | R2 | N/A | | (Norway) Sigurd Zachariassen | 9 |
| 1952–53 | Hovedserien (A)↓ | 1 | 14 | 2 | 3 | 9 | 9 | 36 | 7 | 7th | SF | N/A | | (Norway) Gunnar Skagen | 9 |
| 1953–54 | Landsdelsserien (B)↑ | 2 | 12 | 9 | 3 | 0 | 40 | 8 | 21 | 1st | R4 | N/A | | (Norway) Gunnar Skagen | 12 |
| 1954–55 | Hovedserien (A) | 1 | 14 | 5 | 4 | 5 | 23 | 24 | 14 | 5th | R4 | N/A | | (Norway) Odd Mjåtvedt | 8 |
| 1955–56 | Hovedserien (A)↓ | 1 | 14 | 4 | 3 | 7 | 27 | 27 | 11 | 7th | R4 | N/A | | (Norway) Gunnar Skagen | 11 |
| 1956–57 | Landsdelsserien (B)↑ | 2 | 12 | 9 | 1 | 2 | 40 | 10 | 19 | 1st | QF | N/A | | (Norway) Odd Mjåtvedt (Norway) Roald Paulsen | 8 |
| 1957–58 | Hovedserien (A) | 1 | 14 | 8 | 1 | 5 | 26 | 28 | 17 | 4th | R4 | N/A | | (Norway) Hilmar Paulsen | 15 |
| 1958–59 | Hovedserien (A) | 1 | 14 | 5 | 2 | 7 | 21 | 27 | 12 | 5th | QF | N/A | | (Norway) Thor Hafsås (Norway) Rolf Birger Pedersen | 8 |
| 1959–60 | Hovedserien (A)↓ | 1 | 14 | 4 | 3 | 7 | 19 | 29 | 11 | 7th | QF | N/A | | (Norway) Rolf Birger Pedersen | 9 |
| 1960–61 | Landsdelsserien (C)↑ | 2 | 12 | 9 | 3 | 0 | 45 | 9 | 21 | 1st | R4 | — | | (Norway) Rolf Birger Pedersen | 22 |
| 1961–62 | Hovedserien (Note: The 1961 and 1962 seasons were combined into a single "Marathon League" as part of the process of unifying the first tier of Norwegian football into a single national division.) | 1 | 30 | 21 | 4 | 5 | 94 | 44 | 46 | 1st | SF QF | — | | (Norway) Roald Jensen (Norway) Rolf Birger Pedersen (Note: Pedersen top scorer in Hovedserien with 26 goals.) | 35♦ |
| 1963 | First Division | 1 | 18 | 10 | 4 | 4 | 46 | 27 | 24 | 1st | R4 | — | | (Norway) Roald Jensen | 17 |
| 1964 | First Division↓ | 1 | 18 | 3 | 6 | 9 | 17 | 32 | 12 | 9th | QF | — | | (Norway) Rolf Birger Pedersen | 9 |
| 1965 | Second Division (B) | 2 | 14 | 7 | 5 | 2 | 25 | 19 | 19 | 3rd | QF | — | | (Norway) Knut Vatle | 9 |
| 1966 | Second Division (B) | 2 | 14 | 7 | 2 | 5 | 19 | 13 | 16 | 3rd | R4 | — | | (Norway) Harald Johannessen | 9 |
| 1967 | Second Division (B)↑ | 2 | 14 | 9 | 2 | 3 | 39 | 18 | 20 | 1st | SF | — | | (Norway) Jan Erik Osland | 15 |
| 1968 | First Division | 1 | 18 | 8 | 3 | 7 | 31 | 32 | 19 | 5th | QF | — | | (Norway) Johan Johannessen | 11 |
| 1969 | First Division | 1 | 18 | 6 | 6 | 6 | 20 | 26 | 18 | 6th | R4 | — | | (Norway) Endre Blindheim | 13 |
| 1970 | First Division | 1 | 18 | 9 | 5 | 4 | 18 | 11 | 23 | 4th | QF | — | | (Norway) Egil Austbø (Norway) Harald Johannessen | 5 |
| 1971 | First Division | 1 | 18 | 3 | 5 | 10 | 14 | 31 | 11 | 9th | R3 | — | | (Norway) Kjell Øyasæter | 4 |
| 1972 | First Division | 1 | 22 | 7 | 6 | 9 | 22 | 23 | 20 | 8th | Winners | — | | (Norway) Jan Erik Osland (Norway) Kjell Øyasæter | 9 |
| 1973 | First Division | 1 | 22 | 9 | 5 | 8 | 31 | 27 | 23 | 5th | QF | Cup Winners' Cup | R2 | (Norway) Endre Blindheim (Norway) Kjell Øyasæter | 12 |
| 1974 | First Division | 1 | 22 | 9 | 9 | 4 | 36 | 20 | 27 | 4th | SF | — | | (Norway) Kjell Øyasæter | 13 |
| 1975 | First Division | 1 | 22 | 10 | 7 | 5 | 36 | 27 | 27 | 2nd | R4 | — | | (Norway) Bjørn Tronstad | 12 |
| 1976 | First Division | 1 | 22 | 11 | 6 | 5 | 38 | 29 | 28 | 3rd | Winners | UEFA Cup | R1 | (Norway) Steinar Aase | 21 |
| 1977 | First Division | 1 | 22 | 8 | 6 | 8 | 40 | 35 | 22 | 6th | R4 | Cup Winners' Cup | R2 | (Norway) Bjørn Tronstad | 22 |
| 1978 | First Division | 1 | 22 | 11 | 3 | 8 | 52 | 42 | 25 | 5th | Runners-up | — | | (Norway) Steinar Aase | 20 |
| 1979 | First Division↓ | 1 | 22 | 3 | 4 | 15 | 18 | 40 | 10 | 12th | SF | — | | (Norway) Bjørn Tronstad | 10 |
| 1980 | Second Division (B)↑ | 2 | 22 | 14 | 6 | 2 | 40 | 21 | 34 | 1st | SF | — | | (Norway) Øyvind Pettersen | 10 |
| 1981 | First Division↓ | 1 | 22 | 5 | 7 | 10 | 26 | 40 | 17 | 10th | R4 | — | | (Norway) Ingvar Dalhaug | 7 |
| 1982 | Second Division (B)↑ | 2 | 22 | 13 | 6 | 3 | 44 | 21 | 32 | 1st | Winners | — | | (Norway) Ingvar Dalhaug | 14 |
| 1983 | First Division↓ | 1 | 22 | 7 | 6 | 9 | 31 | 32 | 20 | 10th | R3 | Cup Winners' Cup | R1 | (Norway) Anders Giske | 11 |
| 1984 | Second Division (B)↑ | 2 | 22 | 14 | 4 | 4 | 61 | 28 | 32 | 1st | SF | — | | (Norway) Tore Hadler-Olsen | 21 |
| 1985 | First Division↓ | 1 | 22 | 8 | 3 | 11 | 26 | 34 | 19 | 11th | R4 | — | | (Norway) Trygve Johannessen | 12 |
| 1986 | Second Division (B)↑ | 2 | 22 | 15 | 5 | 2 | 46 | 13 | 35 | 1st | R3 | — | | (Norway) Halvor Storskogen | 14 |
| 1987 (Note: The 1987 season saw the introduction of three points for a win.) | First Division | 1 | 22 | 7 | 3+3 (Note: During the 1987 season draws in the league were decided by penalty shoot-out, with the winner receiving two points and the loser one. Brann drew six games, and both won and lost three shoot-outs.) | 9 | 25 | 28 | 30 | 8th | Runners-up | — | | (Norway) Odd Johnsen (Norway) Halvor Storskogen | 7 |
| 1988 | First Division | 1 | 22 | 7 | 4 | 11 | 16 | 30 | 25 | 9th | Runners-up | — | | (Norway) Odd Johnsen | 12 |
| 1989 | First Division | 1 | 22 | 9 | 3 | 10 | 28 | 31 | 30 | 7th | R2 | Cup Winners' Cup | R1 | (Norway) Atle Torvanger | 9 |
| 1990 | Tippeligaen | 1 | 22 | 11 | 6 | 5 | 34 | 25 | 39 | 4th | SF | — | | (Norway) Mons Ivar Mjelde | 13 |
| 1991 | Tippeligaen | 1 | 22 | 6 | 8 | 8 | 21 | 24 | 26 | 10th | R4 | — | | (Norway) Sten Glenn Håberg | 7 |
| 1992 | Tippeligaen | 1 | 22 | 4 | 12 | 6 | 26 | 30 | 24 | 7th | R3 | — | | (Norway) Trond Egil Soltvedt | 8 |
| 1993 | Tippeligaen | 1 | 22 | 7 | 5 | 10 | 31 | 38 | 26 | 7th | SF | — | | (Norway) Trond Egil Soltvedt | 18 |
| 1994 | Tippeligaen | 1 | 22 | 9 | 4 | 9 | 38 | 46 | 31 | 6th | QF | — | | (Norway) Trond Egil Soltvedt | 17 |
| 1995 | Tippeligaen | 1 | 26 | 9 | 5 | 12 | 40 | 50 | 32 | 10th | Runners-up | — | | (Norway) Frank Strandli | 13 |
| 1996 | Tippeligaen | 1 | 26 | 11 | 9 | 6 | 64 | 50 | 42 | 4th | R4 | Cup Winners' Cup | QF | (Norway) Mons Ivar Mjelde | 25 |
| 1997 | Tippeligaen | 1 | 26 | 15 | 5 | 6 | 59 | 37 | 50 | 2nd | R4 | UEFA Cup | Q2 | (Norway) Mons Ivar Mjelde | 20 |
| 1998 | Tippeligaen | 1 | 26 | 9 | 8 | 9 | 44 | 39 | 35 | 6th | SF | UEFA Cup | R1 | (Norway) Kjetil Løvvik | 17 |
| 1999 | Tippeligaen | 1 | 26 | 16 | 1 | 9 | 45 | 40 | 49 | 3rd | Runners-up | Intertoto Cup | R2 | (Norway) Kjetil Løvvik | 12 |
| 2000 | Tippeligaen | 1 | 26 | 14 | 5 | 7 | 53 | 40 | 47 | 2nd | R4 | UEFA Cup | R1 | (Norway) Thorstein Helstad (Note: 18 goals in Tippeligaen.) | 19♦ |
| 2001 | Tippeligaen | 1 | 26 | 12 | 5 | 9 | 63 | 48 | 41 | 7th | QF | Champions League | Q2 | (Norway) Thorstein Helstad (Note: 17 goals in Tippeligaen, joint top scorer with Frode Johnsen of Rosenborg and Clayton Zane of Lillestrøm.) | 20♦ |
| 2002 | Tippeligaen | 1 | 26 | 8 | 3 | 15 | 35 | 52 | 27 | 12th | R4 | UEFA Cup | QR | (Norway) Tommy Knarvik | 9 |
| 2003 | Tippeligaen | 1 | 26 | 10 | 7 | 9 | 45 | 47 | 37 | 6th | R4 | — | | (Norway) Petter Furuseth | 10 |
| 2004 | Tippeligaen | 1 | 26 | 12 | 4 | 10 | 46 | 40 | 40 | 3rd | Winners | Royal League | GS2 | (Scotland) Robbie Winters | 26 |
| 2005 | Tippeligaen | 1 | 26 | 10 | 7 | 9 | 44 | 32 | 37 | 6th | QF | UEFA Cup | R1 | (Scotland) Charlie Miller | 13 |
| 2006 | Tippeligaen | 1 | 26 | 14 | 4 | 8 | 39 | 36 | 46 | 2nd | R4 | UEFA Cup Royal League | Q2 QF | (Norway) Bengt Sæternes | 10 |
| 2007 | Tippeligaen | 1 | 26 | 17 | 3 | 6 | 59 | 39 | 54 | 1st | R4 | UEFA Cup | R32 | (Norway) Thorstein Helstad (Note: 22 goals in Tippeligaen.) | 27♦ |
| 2008 | Tippeligaen | 1 | 26 | 8 | 9 | 9 | 36 | 36 | 33 | 8th | R4 | Champions League UEFA Cup | Q3 R1 | (Norway) Thorstein Helstad | 13 |
| 2009 | Tippeligaen | 1 | 30 | 12 | 8 | 10 | 51 | 49 | 44 | 5th | QF | — | | (Norway) Erik Huseklepp | 15 |
| 2010 | Tippeligaen | 1 | 30 | 8 | 10 | 12 | 48 | 50 | 34 | 13th | R2 | — | | (Norway) Petter Vaagan Moen | 15 |
| 2011 | Tippeligaen | 1 | 30 | 14 | 6 | 10 | 51 | 49 | 48 | 4th | Runners-up | — | | (Nigeria) Kim Ojo | 18 |
| 2012 | Tippeligaen | 1 | 30 | 13 | 3 | 14 | 57 | 50 | 42 | 6th | SF | — | | (Nigeria) Kim Ojo | 15 |
| 2013 | Tippeligaen | 1 | 30 | 11 | 6 | 13 | 46 | 46 | 39 | 8th | R3 | — | | (Austria) Martin Pušić | 13 |
| 2014 | Tippeligaen↓ | 1 | 30 | 8 | 5 | 17 | 41 | 54 | 29 | 14th | QF | — | | (Sweden) Jakob Orlov | 10 |
| 2015 | OBOS-ligaen↑ | 2 | 30 | 14 | 11 | 5 | 46 | 35 | 53 | 2nd | R4 | — | | (Norway) Erik Huseklepp | 10 |
| 2016 | Tippeligaen | 1 | 30 | 16 | 6 | 8 | 42 | 27 | 54 | 2nd | R1 | — | | (Norway) Steffen Lie Skålevik | 6 |
| 2017 | Eliteserien | 1 | 30 | 13 | 8 | 9 | 51 | 36 | 47 | 5th | R4 | Europa League Mesterfinalen | Q2 Runners-up | (Norway) Kristoffer Barmen | 8 |
| 2018 | Eliteserien | 1 | 30 | 17 | 7 | 6 | 45 | 31 | 58 | 3rd | R4 | — | | (Norway) Steffen Lie Skålevik | 9 |
| 2019 | Eliteserien | 1 | 30 | 10 | 10 | 10 | 32 | 37 | 40 | 9th | R4 | Europa League | Q1 | (Ivory Coast) Daouda Bamba | 8 |
| 2020 | Eliteserien | 1 | 30 | 9 | 9 | 12 | 40 | 49 | 36 | 10th | Canceled (Note: The 2020 Norwegian Football Cup was canceled due to the COVID-19 pandemic in Norway.) | — | | (Ivory Coast) Daouda Bamba | 10 |
| 2021 | Eliteserien↓ | 1 | 30 | 5 | 11 | 14 | 38 | 55 | 26 | 14th | R4 | — | | (Norway) Aune Heggebø | 11 |
| 2022 | OBOS-ligaen↑ | 2 | 30 | 26 | 3 | 1 | 95 | 16 | 81 | 1st | Winners | — | | (Norway) Bård Finne (Note: 16 goals in OBOS-ligaen, joint top scorer with Gift Orban of Stabæk.) | 23♦ |
| 2023 | Eliteserien | 1 | 30 | 19 | 4 | 7 | 55 | 35 | 61 | 2nd | QF | Conference League | PO | (Norway) Bård Finne | 29 |
| 2024 | Eliteserien | 1 | 30 | 17 | 8 | 5 | 55 | 33 | 59 | 2nd | R3 | Conference League | PO | (Norway) Aune Heggebø | 15 |
| 2025 | Eliteserien | 1 | 30 | 17 | 5 | 8 | 55 | 46 | 56 | 4th | R3 | Champions League Europa League | Q2 LP | (Denmark) Emil Kornvig | 11 |

== Women's team ==
Results of league and cup competitions by season
| Season | League | | | | | | | | | | Cup | UEFA / Other | | Top goalscorer(s) | |
| Season | Division | Tier | Pld | W | D | L | GF | GA | Pts | Pos | Cup | Competition | Result | Player(s) | Goals |
|---|---|---|---|---|---|---|---|---|---|---|---|---|---|---|---|
| 2022 | Toppserien (Note: The 2022 Toppserien was played with a play-off system. The top numbers represent the league phase where all the teams met each other twice, while the bottom numbers represent the championship play-off phase where the four best teams entered with a pre-determined amount of points before facing each other twice.) | 1 | 18 6 | 14 4 | 3 2 | 1 0 | 53 10 | 13 4 | 45 20 | 1st | Winners | Champions League | Q2 | (Norway) Maria Brochmann | 16 |
| 2023 | Toppserien | 1 | 27 | 13 | 7 | 7 | 52 | 30 | 46 | 4th | QF | Champions League | QF | (Norway) Maria Brochmann | 14 |
| 2024 | Toppserien | 1 | 27 | 19 | 1 | 7 | 70 | 24 | 58 | 2nd | SF | — | | (Norway) Anna Aahjem (Note: 18 goals in Toppserien.) | 19♦ |
| 2025 | Toppserien | 1 | 27 | 24 | 2 | 1 | 90 | 11 | 74 | 1st | SF | Champions League Europa Cup | Q3 Q2 | (Scotland) Lauren Davidson | 18 |
