= 1963 SK Brann season =

SK Brann
1963 season
- Manager: Oddvar Hansen
- 1. Divisjon: 1st
- Norwegian Cup: Fourth round
- Top goalscorer: League: Roald Jensen (10); All: Roald Jensen (16)
- Highest home attendance: 20,897 vs Fredrikstad (19 May 1963)
- Lowest home attendance: 10,750 vs Gjøvik-Lyn (28 July 1963)

The 1963 season was Brann's 1st season after the league changed to 10 teams and was named 1. Divisjon.

== First Division ==
Date	Opponents	H / A	Result F – A	Scorers	Attendance
28 April 1963	Gjøvik-Lyn	A	0 – 2		10,437
4 May 1963	Frigg	H	8 – 1	Pedersen (2), Jensen (2), Paulsen (2), B.O. Andersen, Hetleøen	17,071
30 May 1963	Skeid	A	1 – 2	?	18,534
19 May 1963	Fredrikstad	H	1 – 1	Pedersen	20,897
22 May 1963	Viking	A	1 – 1	Paulsen	10,600
26 May 1963	Lyn	H	0 – 6		14,704
9 June 1963	Steinkjer	A	3 – 0	Paulsen (2), B.O. Andersen	7,813
15 June 1963	Sarpsborg	H	7 – 1	Jensen (2), Pedersen (2), Paulsen, B.O. Andersen, Hauge	12,016
24 June 1963	Vålerenga	A	4 – 2	Pedersen, T. Andersen, Paulsen, Oppedal	13,409
28 July 1963	Gjøvik-Lyn	H	3 – 1	B.O. Andersen, Pedersen, Hauge	10,750
6 August 1963	Frigg	A	3 – 4	Jensen, Pedersen, B.O. Andersen	10,855
18 August 1963	Skeid	H	2 – 1	Jensen, Pedersen	12,584
21 August 1963	Fredrikstad	A	1 – 1	B.O. Andersen	9,214
24 August 1963	Viking	H	2 – 1	Jensen (2)	15,733
8 September 1963	Lyn	A	3 – 1	Pedersen, Jensen, Paulsen	11,088
22 September 1963	Steinkjer	H	3 – 0	Jensen, T. Andersen, Hauge	17,133
6 October 1963	Sarpsborg	A	1 – 1	Hauge	7,192
13 October 1963	Vålerenga	H	3 – 1	B.O. Andersen (2), Amundsen	20,030

=== Table ===
Pos	Team	Pld	W	D	L	GF	GA	GD	Pts	Qualification or relegation
1	Brann (C)	18	10	4	4	46	27	+19	24	
2	Lyn	18	10	3	5	38	28	+10	23	Qualification for the European Cup first round
3	Skeid	18	9	2	7	41	26	+15	20	Qualification for the Cup Winners' Cup first round
4	Fredrikstad	18	7	6	5	32	25	+7	20	
5	Frigg	18	6	6	6	31	40	−9	18	

Source: NIFS
Rules for classification: 1) points; 2) goal difference; 3) number of goals scored.
(C) Champions

== Cup ==
Date	Round	Opponents	H / A	Result F – A	Scorers	Attendance
6 June 1963	Round 1	Trane	H	7 – 0	Pedersen (2), T. Andersen (2), Hauge (2), Jensen	?
21 June 1963	Round 2	Fana	H	9 – 0	Jensen (5), Ellingsen (2), Pedersen, Hauge	?
11 August 1963	Round 3	Bryne	A	2 – 1	Hetleøen, Amundsen	?
1 September 1963	Round 4	Sagene	H	0 – 1		?

== Squad statistics ==
Pos.	Name	League		Cup		Total	
Pos.	Name	Apps	Goals	Apps	Goals	Apps	Goals
FW	(Norway) Roald Jensen	18	10	4	6	22	16
FW	(Norway) Rolf Birger Pedersen	18	10	4	3	22	13
FW	(Norway) Bjørn Odmar Andersen	18	8	3	0	21	8
MF	(Norway) Trygve Andersen	18	2	3	2	21	4
DF	(Norway) Gunnar Tiller	18	0	3	0	21	0
FW	(Norway) Roald Paulsen	17	8	2	0	19	8
GK	(Norway) Arthur Larsen	17	0	3	0	20	0
MF	(Norway) Odd Oppedal	13	1	1	0	14	1
DF	(Norway) Tore Nordtvedt	12	0	0	0	12	0
FW	(Norway) Torgeir Hauge	10	4	3	3	13	7
?	(Norway) Harald Gundersen	10	0	0	0	10	0
?	(Norway) Per Pettersen	9	0	0	0	9	0
FW	(Norway) Leif Amundsen	9	1	4	1	13	2
DF	(Norway) Arild Hetleøen	5	1	2	1	7	2
MF	(Norway) Kjell Schou-Andreassen	5	0	1	0	6	0
GK	(Norway) Ivar Farestvedt	1	0	0	0	1	0
GK	(Norway) Sigurd Antonsen	1	0	1	0	2	0
?	(Norway) Kjell Ellingsen	0	0	1	2	1	2
