= 1961 in Norwegian football =

Football in Norway
- Season: 1961

Men's football
- Hovedserien: Fredrikstad
- Landsdelsserien: Ørn (Group East/South); Frigg (Group East/North); Start (Group South/West A); Ulf (Group South/West B); Brann (Group South/West C); Langevåg (Group Møre); Steinkjer (Group Trøndelag)
- NM: Fredrikstad

The 1961 season was the 56th season of competitive football in Norway.

== Hovedserien ==
=== Group A ===
Pos	Team	Pld	W	D	L	GF	GA	GD	Pts	Qualification or relegation
1	Fredrikstad (C)	14	10	2	2	43	21	+22	22	Qualification for the championship final
2	Vålerengen	14	6	2	6	24	17	+7	14	
3	Viking	14	5	4	5	24	24	0	14	
4	Larvik Turn	14	4	6	4	24	30	−6	14	
5	Odd	14	4	5	5	26	29	−3	13	
6	Lisleby	14	5	3	6	20	26	−6	13	
7	Strømmen (R)	14	3	5	6	16	22	−6	11	Relegation to Landsdelsserien
8	Stavanger (R)	14	3	5	6	15	23	−8	11	Relegation to Landsdelsserien

Source: RSSSF
(C) Champions; (R) Relegated

=== Group B ===
Pos	Team	Pld	W	D	L	GF	GA	GD	Pts	Qualification or relegation
1	Eik	14	8	2	4	35	21	+14	18	Qualification for the championship final
2	Lyn	14	7	3	4	41	27	+14	17	
3	Rosenborg	14	6	4	4	28	28	0	16	
4	Greåker	14	8	0	6	22	26	−4	16	
5	Sandefjord	14	6	2	6	34	32	+2	14	
6	Skeid	14	3	6	5	21	20	+1	12	
7	Lillestrøm (R)	14	4	3	7	29	33	−4	11	Relegation to Landsdelsserien
8	Rapid (R)	14	3	2	9	19	42	−23	8	Relegation to Landsdelsserien

Source: RSSSF
(R) Relegated

=== Championship final ===
June 16: Fredrikstad - Eik 2 - 0

=== Bronze final ===
June 14: Vålerengen - Lyn 6 - 4

== Landsdelsserien ==
=== Group Østland/Søndre ===
Pos	Team	Pld	W	D	L	GF	GA	GD	Pts	Promotion or relegation
1	Ørn (P)	14	9	1	4	45	23	+22	19	Promotion to Hovedserien
2	Sarpsborg	14	8	3	3	26	13	+13	19	
3	Moss	14	7	4	3	27	19	+8	18	
4	Fram	14	7	2	5	24	21	+3	16	
5	Pors	14	7	2	5	19	30	−11	16	
6	Sparta	14	5	1	8	18	25	−7	11	
7	Selbak (R)	14	3	2	9	23	31	−8	8	Relegation to 3. divisjon
8	Askim (R)	14	2	1	11	11	31	−20	5	Relegation to 3. divisjon

Source: rsssf.no
Rules for classification: 1) points; 2) goal difference; 3) number of goals scored.
(P) Promoted; (R) Relegated

=== Group Østland/Nordre ===
Pos	Team	Pld	W	D	L	GF	GA	GD	Pts	Promotion or relegation
1	Frigg (P)	14	10	1	3	38	14	+24	21	Promotion to Hovedserien
2	Mjøndalen	14	7	3	4	35	28	+7	17	
3	Asker	14	6	4	4	26	17	+9	16	
4	Gjøvik-Lyn	14	8	0	6	30	30	0	16	
5	Raufoss	14	5	5	4	28	19	+9	15	
6	Fremad (R)	14	4	2	8	25	38	−13	10	
7	Sandaker (R)	14	3	3	8	18	31	−13	9	Relegation to 3. divisjon
8	Geithus (R)	14	3	2	9	20	43	−23	8	Relegation to 3. divisjon

Source: rsssf.no
Rules for classification: 1) points; 2) goal difference; 3) number of goals scored.
(P) Promoted; (R) Relegated

=== Group Sørland/Vestland, A ===
Pos	Team	Pld	W	D	L	GF	GA	GD	Pts	Qualification or relegation
1	Start	12	11	1	0	40	9	+31	23	Qualification for the promotion play-offs
2	Sørfjell	12	8	2	2	34	22	+12	18	
3	Jerv	12	6	1	5	26	35	−9	13	
4	Vindbjart	12	5	0	7	28	23	+5	10	
5	Flekkefjord	12	3	2	7	19	29	−10	8	
6	Nedenes	12	3	1	8	25	31	−6	7	
7	Våg (R)	12	2	1	9	13	36	−23	5	Qualification for the relegation play-offs

Source: rsssf.no
Rules for classification: 1) points; 2) goal difference; 3) number of goals scored.
(R) Relegated

=== Group Sørland/Vestland, B ===
Pos	Team	Pld	W	D	L	GF	GA	GD	Pts	Qualification or relegation
1	Ulf	14	7	5	2	26	10	+16	19	Qualification for the promotion play-offs
2	Vard	14	7	5	2	22	9	+13	19	
3	Bryne	14	8	2	4	28	14	+14	18	
4	Haugar	14	7	4	3	32	19	+13	18	
5	Jarl	14	6	1	7	26	33	−7	13	
6	Vidar (R)	14	3	6	5	14	19	−5	12	Relegation to 3. divisjon
7	Djerv 1919 (R)	14	2	4	8	10	28	−18	8	Relegation to 3. divisjon
8	Egersund (R)	14	1	3	10	7	33	−26	5	Relegation to 3. divisjon

Source: rsssf.no
Rules for classification: 1) points; 2) goal difference; 3) number of goals scored.
(R) Relegated

=== Group Sørland/Vestland, C ===
Pos	Team	Pld	W	D	L	GF	GA	GD	Pts	Qualification or relegation
1	Brann (O, P)	12	9	3	0	45	9	+36	21	Qualification for the promotion play-offs
2	Os	12	7	2	3	30	20	+10	16	
3	Varegg	12	7	1	4	24	17	+7	15	
4	Årstad	12	4	3	5	9	13	−4	11	
5	Fana	12	4	1	7	20	24	−4	9	
6	Trane	12	1	5	6	6	25	−19	7	
7	Nordnes	12	1	3	8	6	32	−26	5	

Source: rsssf.no
Rules for classification: 1) points; 2) goal difference; 3) number of goals scored.
(O) Play-off winners; (P) Promoted

=== Group Møre ===
Pos	Team	Pld	W	D	L	GF	GA	GD	Pts	Qualification or relegation
1	Langevåg	14	12	0	2	63	15	+48	24	Qualification for the promotion play-offs
2	Hødd	14	10	2	2	53	20	+33	22	
3	Aalesund	14	9	1	4	32	23	+9	19	
4	Braatt	14	6	2	6	25	33	−8	14	
5	Molde	14	4	5	5	26	29	−3	13	
6	Kristiansund	14	3	5	6	25	31	−6	11	
7	Herd (R)	14	3	3	8	18	32	−14	9	Relegation to 3. divisjon
8	Framtid (R)	14	0	0	14	9	68	−59	0	Relegation to 3. divisjon

Source: rsssf.no
Rules for classification: 1) points; 2) goal difference; 3) number of goals scored.
(R) Relegated

=== Group Trøndelag ===
Pos	Team	Pld	W	D	L	GF	GA	GD	Pts	Qualification or relegation
1	Steinkjer (O, P)	14	13	0	1	63	18	+45	26	Qualification for the promotion play-offs
2	Kvik	14	10	1	3	32	11	+21	21	
3	Brage	14	7	2	5	21	19	+2	16	
4	Freidig	14	5	5	4	27	22	+5	15	
5	Nessegutten	14	6	1	7	22	32	−10	13	
6	Falken	14	3	2	9	14	26	−12	8	
7	Sverre	14	2	3	9	16	43	−27	7	
8	Fram (R)	14	3	0	11	28	52	−24	6	Relegation to 3. divisjon

Source: rsssf.no
Rules for classification: 1) points; 2) goal difference; 3) number of goals scored.
(O) Play-off winners; (P) Promoted; (R) Relegated

=== Play-off Sørland/Vestland ===
- Brann - Ulf 1-1
- Ulf - Start 2-2
- Start - Brann 1-3

Pos	Team	Pld	W	D	L	GF	GA	GD	Pts	Qualification
1	Brann (O, P)	2	1	1	0	4	2	+2	3	Promotion to Hovedserien
2	Ulf	2	0	2	0	3	3	0	2	Remained in Landsdelsserien
3	Start	2	0	1	1	3	5	−2	1	Remained in Landsdelsserien

Source: rsssf.no
Rules for classification: 1) points; 2) goal difference; 3) number of goals scored.
(O) Play-off winners; (P) Promoted

=== Play-off Møre/Trøndelag ===
- Langevåg - Steinkjer 3-3
- Steinkjer - Langevåg 3-2 (agg. 6-5)

Steinkjer promoted

=== Relegation play-off ===
Våg- Vigør 0 - 5 (in Vennesla)

Våg relegated

== Third division ==
=== District I ===
1. Østsiden        	(Promoted)
2. Tistedalen
3. Hafslund
4. Tune
5. Sprint/Jeløy
6. Navestad
7. Gresvik
8. Ørje

=== District II, group A ===
1. Vestfossen      		(Play-off)
2. Drafn
3. Åssiden
4. Sagene
5. Røa
6. Liull
7. Fossekallen
8. Spartacus

=== District II, group B ===
1. Aurskog         		(Play-off)
2. Drammens BK
3. Kongsvinger
4. Slemmestad
5. Grue
6. Strømsgodset
7. Kjelsås
8. Sterling

=== District III, group A (Oplandene) ===
1. Hamarkameratene 	(Play-off)
2. Kapp
3. Hamar IL
4. Lena
5. Brumunddal
6. Gjøvik SK
7. Mesna
8. Einastrand

=== District III, group B1 (Sør-Østerdal) ===
1. Ytre Rendal     	(Play-off)
2. Trysilgutten
3. Elverum
4. Nordre Trysil
5. Koppang
6. Nybergsund
7. Innsats

=== District III, group B2 (Sør-Gudbrandsdal) ===
1. Kvam            	(Play-off)
2. Faaberg
3. Fåvang
4. Follebu
5. Vinstra
6. Sør-Fron 		(withdrew)

=== District III, group B3 (Nord-Gudbrandsdal) ===
Lesja           (Play-off)

Table unknown.

=== District IV, group A (Vestfold) ===
1. Runar           		(Play-off)
2. Holmestrand
3. Tønsberg Turn
4. Falk
5. Flint
6. Tønsebergkam.
7. Borre
8. Teie

=== District IV, group B (Grenland) ===
1. Skiens-Grane    		(Play-off)
2. Urædd
3. Herkules
4. Borg
5. Brevik
6. Kragerø
7. Gjerpen
8. Langesund

=== District IV, group B (Øvre Telemark) ===
1. Heddal          		(Play-off)
2. Snøgg
3. Drangedal
4. Gvarv
5. Rjukan
6. Ulefoss

=== District V, group A1 (Aust-Agder) ===
1. Grane (Arendal) 		(Play-off)
2. Risør
3. Rygene
4. Dristug
5. Arendals BK
6. Mykland 			(withdrew)

=== District V, group A2 (Vest-Agder) ===
1. Vigør           		(Play-off)
2. Donn
3. Mandalskam.
4. Giv Akt
5. Torridal
6. Farsund

=== District V, group B1 (Rogaland) ===
1. Buøy            		(Play-off)
2. Nærbø
3. Varhaug
4. Hinna
5. Ålgård
6. Figgjo
7. Riska

=== District V, group B2 (Rogaland) ===
1. Randaberg       		(Play-off)
2. Klepp
3. Kopervik
4. Sola
5. Vaulen
6. Torvastad
7. Orre

=== District V, group C (Sunnhordland) ===
1. Stord           		(Play-off)
2. Odda
3. Fonna
4. Rubbestadnes
5. Solid
6. Tyssedal 			(withdrew)

=== District VI, group A (Bergen) ===
1. Djerv           		(Play-off)
2. Nymark
3. Fjellkameratene
4. Laksevåg
5. Sandviken
6. Hardy
7. Bergens-Sparta

=== District VI, group B (Midthordland) ===
1. Arna            		(Play-off)
2. Erdal
3. Voss
4. Follese
5. Kjøkkelvik
6. Florvåg
7. Osterøy

=== District VII, group A (Sunnmøre) ===
1. Skarbøvik       		(Play-off)
2. Velled./Ringen
3. Rollon
4. Aksla
5. Ørsta
6. Hovdebygda
7. Volda
8. Brattvåg

=== District VII, group B (Romsdal) ===
1. Træff           		(Play-off)
2. Åndalsnes
3. Nord-Gossen
4. Eidsvåg (Romsdal)
5. Isfjorden
6. Frode
7. Eide

=== District VII, group C (Nordmøre) ===
1. Clausenengen    		(Play-off)
2. Dahle
3. Todalen
4. Sunndal
5. Nordlandet
6. Bøfjord
7. Goma
8. Tingvoll 			(withdrew)

=== District VIII, group A (Sør-Trøndelag) ===
1. Troll           			(Play-off)
2. Løkken
3. Orkanger
4. Svorkmo
5. Leik
6. Orkdal
7. Melhus
8. Støren 			(withdrew)

=== District VIII, group B (Trondheim og omegn) ===
1. Ranheim         		(Play-off)
2. Tryggkameratene
3. Nidelv
4. National
5. Trond
6. Vestbyen
7. Wing
8. Trondheims/Ørn

=== District VIII, group C (Fosen) ===
1. Brekstad        		(Play-off)
2. Fevåg
3. Hasselvika
4. Beian
5. Opphaug
6. Bjugn
7. Stadsbygd 		(withdrew)

=== District VIII, group D (Nord-Trøndelag/Namdal) ===
1. Verdal          		(Play-off)
2. Neset
3. Stjørdals/Blink
4. Bangsund
5. Namsos
6. Snåsa
7. Henning
8. Malm

=== District IX ===
1. Bodø/Glimt
2. Mo
3. Stålkameratene
4. Brønnøysund
5. Sandnessjøen
6. Mosjøen

=== District X ===
1. Mjølner
2. Harstad
3. Narvik/Nor
4. Andenes
5. Tromsø
6. Lia-Brage

=== Play-off District II ===
- Aurskog - Vestfossen 1-2
- Vestfossen - Aurskog 1-3 (agg. 3-4)

Aurskog promoted.

=== Play-off District III ===
1. Ytre Rendal    		(Play-off)
- - - - - - - - - - - - - - - - - - -
2. Kvam
3. Lesja

- Ytre Rendal - Hamarkameratene 0-1
- Hamarkameratene - Ytre Rendal 4-1 (agg. 5-1)

Hamarkameratene promoted

=== Play-off District IV ===
- Runar - Skiens-Grane 5-3
- Heddal - Runar 1-1
- Skiens-Grane - Heddal 0-3

Pos	Team	Pld	W	D	L	GF	GA	GD	Pts	Promotion
1	Heddal	2	1	1	0	4	1	+3	3	Promoted
2	Runar	2	1	1	0	6	4	+2	3	
3	Skiens-Grane	2	0	0	2	3	8	−5	0	

=== Play-off District V ===
- Vigør - Grane 3 - 1
- Grane - Vigør 4 - 2 (agg. 5 - 5)
- Grane - Vigør 3 - 1 (in Grimstad)

Grane (Arendal) promoted

- Våg - Vigør 0 - 5 (in Vennesla)

Vigør promoted

- Buøy - Randaberg 0 - 0
- Randaberg - Buøy 4 - 0 (agg. 4 - 0)

Randaberg promoted

Buøy - Stord 5 - 0 (in Haugesund)

Buøy promoted

=== Championship District V ===
- Grane - Randaberg (not played)

=== Play-off District VI ===
- Arne - Djerv 1 - 1
- Djerv - Arna 12 - 0 (agg. 13 - 1)

Djerv promoted

=== Play-off District VII ===
- Træff - Clausenengen 0 - 9
- Skarbøvik - Træff 3 - 0
- Clausenengen - Skarbøvik 3 - 2

Pos	Team	Pld	W	D	L	GF	GA	GD	Pts	Promotion
1	Clausenengen	2	2	0	0	12	2	+10	4	Promoted
2	Skarbøvik	2	1	0	1	5	3	+2	2	Promoted
3	Træff	2	0	0	2	0	12	−12	0	

=== Play-off District VIII ===
- Brekstad - Verdal 0-3
- Ranheim - Troll 4-0
- Troll - Brekstad 2-3
- Verdal - Ranheim 2-1
- Ranheim - Brekstad 5-1
- Troll - Verdal 1-6

Pos	Team	Pld	W	D	L	GF	GA	GD	Pts	Promotion
1	Verdal	3	3	0	0	11	2	+9	6	Promoted
2	Ranheim	3	2	0	1	10	3	+7	4	Promoted
3	Brekstad	3	1	0	2	4	10	−6	2	
4	Troll	3	0	0	3	3	13	−10	0	

== Norwegian Cup ==
=== Final ===
22 October 1961

Fredrikstad	7–0	Haugar
Borgen 37'; Olsen 43', 77'; Kristoffersen 47', 63'; Pedersen 57'; Kristiansen 67' (pen.)	Report

Ullevaal Stadion, Oslo
Attendance: 30,273
Referee: Bjørn Borgersen (Mercantile)

== Northern Norwegian Cup ==
=== Final ===
Mjølner	2–1	Bodø/Glimt
	Report

== European cups ==
=== Norwegian representatives ===
- Fredrikstad (Champions Cup)

=== Preliminary rounds ===
September 6: Standard Liege (Belgium) - Fredrikstad 2 - 1

September 20: Fredrikstad - Standard Liege 0 - 2 (agg. 4 - 1)

== National team ==
Date	Venue	Opponent	Res.*	Competition	Norwegian goalscorers
May 16	Bergen	Mexico	1–1	Friendly	Rolf Bjørn Backe
June 1	Oslo	Turkey	0–1	WCQ	
June 27	Helsinki	Finland	1–4	NC series	Rolf Birger Pedersen
July 1	Moscow	Soviet Union	2–5	WCQ	Bjørn Borgen, Eldar Hansen
August 23	Oslo	Soviet Union	0–3	WCQ	
September 17	Oslo	Denmark	0–4	NC series	
October 22	Gothenburg	Sweden	0–2	NC series	
October 29	Istanbul	Turkey	1–2	WCQ	Roald Jensen
November 5	Gzira	Malta	1–1	Friendly	Arne Kotte

Note: Norway's goals first
Explanation:

- WCQ = 1962 World Cup Qualifier
