= 1960 in Norwegian football =

Football in Norway
- Season: 1960

Men's football
- Hovedserien: Fredrikstad
- Landsdelsserien: Lisleby (Group East/South); Lyn (Group East/North); Vindbjart (Group South/West A); Stavanger (Group South/West B); Årstad (Group South/West C); Kristiansund (Group Møre); Rosenborg (Group Trøndelag)
- NM: Rosenborg

The 1960 season was the 55th season of competitive football in Norway.

== Hovedserien 1959/60 ==
=== Group A ===
Pos	Team	Pld	W	D	L	GF	GA	GD	Pts	Qualification or relegation
1	Lillestrøm	14	8	3	3	28	21	+7	19	Qualification for the championship final
2	Vålerengen	14	8	2	4	27	21	+6	18	
3	Viking	14	6	4	4	25	18	+7	16	
4	Larvik Turn	14	7	1	6	32	22	+10	15	
5	Greåker	14	5	4	5	25	20	+5	14	
6	Sandefjord BK	14	5	4	5	16	18	−2	14	
7	Brann (R)	14	4	3	7	19	29	−10	11	Relegation to Landsdelsserien
8	Start (R)	14	1	3	10	15	38	−23	5	Relegation to Landsdelsserien

Source: RSSSF
(R) Relegated

=== Group B ===
Pos	Team	Pld	W	D	L	GF	GA	GD	Pts	Qualification or relegation
1	Fredrikstad (C)	14	10	3	1	41	16	+25	23	Qualification for the championship final
2	Eik	14	8	1	5	30	21	+9	17	
3	Skeid	14	7	3	4	30	23	+7	17	
4	Rapid	14	6	3	5	21	26	−5	15	
5	Odd	14	5	3	6	25	25	0	13	
6	Strømmen	14	5	3	6	23	27	−4	13	
7	Raufoss (R)	14	2	4	8	20	36	−16	8	Relegation to Landsdelsserien
8	Brage (R)	14	1	4	9	14	30	−16	6	Relegation to Landsdelsserien

Source: RSSSF
(C) Champions; (R) Relegated

=== Championship final ===
June 15: Fredrikstad - Lillestrøm 6 - 2

=== Bronze final ===
June 16: Eik - Vålerengen 4 - 2

== Landsdelsserien ==
=== Group Østland/Søndre ===
Pos	Team	Pld	W	D	L	GF	GA	GD	Pts	Promotion or relegation
1	Lisleby (P)	14	10	2	2	32	13	+19	22	Promotion to Hovedserien
2	Sarpsborg	14	9	4	1	31	12	+19	22	
3	Moss	14	7	4	3	26	17	+9	18	
4	Fram	14	7	2	5	24	25	−1	16	
5	Pors	14	4	6	4	26	21	+5	14	
6	Selbak	14	5	2	7	20	23	−3	12	
7	Sparta	14	1	3	10	19	37	−18	5	
8	Snøgg (R)	14	1	1	12	14	44	−30	3	Relegation to 3. divisjon

Source: rsssf.no
Rules for classification: 1) points; 2) goal difference; 3) number of goals scored.
(P) Promoted; (R) Relegated

=== Group Østland/Nordre ===
Pos	Team	Pld	W	D	L	GF	GA	GD	Pts	Promotion or relegation
1	Lyn (P)	14	9	2	3	36	25	+11	20	Promotion to Hovedserien
2	Mjøndalen	14	7	4	3	37	27	+10	18	
3	Gjøvik-Lyn	14	7	3	4	32	24	+8	17	
4	Asker	14	8	0	6	36	23	+13	16	
5	Sandaker	14	6	3	5	25	25	0	15	
6	Frigg	14	6	2	6	38	29	+9	14	
7	Sagene (R)	14	2	2	10	19	44	−25	6	Relegation to 3. divisjon
8	Kapp (R)	14	2	2	10	21	47	−26	6	Relegation to 3. divisjon

Source: rsssf.no
Rules for classification: 1) points; 2) goal difference; 3) number of goals scored.
(P) Promoted; (R) Relegated

=== Group Sørland/Vestland, A ===
Pos	Team	Pld	W	D	L	GF	GA	GD	Pts	Qualification or relegation
1	Vindbjart	12	8	1	3	27	15	+12	17	Qualification for the promotion play-offs
2	Sørfjell	12	7	2	3	25	13	+12	16	
3	Jerv	12	6	2	4	33	22	+11	14	
4	Flekkefjord	12	6	1	5	22	18	+4	13	
5	Nedenes	12	5	1	6	17	35	−18	11	
6	Grane (R)	12	3	1	8	18	26	−8	7	Relegation to 3. divisjon
7	Donn (R)	12	3	0	9	19	32	−13	6	Relegation to 3. divisjon

Source: rsssf.no
Rules for classification: 1) points; 2) goal difference; 3) number of goals scored.
(R) Relegated

=== Group Sørland/Vestland, B ===
Pos	Team	Pld	W	D	L	GF	GA	GD	Pts	Qualification or relegation
1	Stavanger (O, P)	14	10	2	2	40	19	+21	22	Qualification for the promotion play-offs
2	Vard	14	9	2	3	30	16	+14	20	
3	Haugar	14	6	3	5	28	22	+6	15	
4	Djerv 1919	14	6	1	7	22	20	+2	13	
5	Vidar	14	6	1	7	25	31	−6	13	
6	Bryne	14	6	1	7	23	33	−10	13	
7	Egersund	14	5	2	7	22	24	−2	12	
8	Kopervik (R)	14	1	2	11	17	42	−25	4	Relegation to 3. divisjon

Source: rsssf.no
Rules for classification: 1) points; 2) goal difference; 3) number of goals scored.
(O) Play-off winners; (P) Promoted; (R) Relegated

=== Group Sørland/Vestland, C ===
Pos	Team	Pld	W	D	L	GF	GA	GD	Pts	Qualification or relegation
1	Årstad	12	8	3	1	26	11	+15	19	Qualification for the promotion play-offs
2	Os	12	7	2	3	36	21	+15	16	
3	Fana	12	5	3	4	24	18	+6	13	
4	Varegg	12	4	4	4	23	23	0	12	
5	Nordnes	12	3	4	5	10	14	−4	10	
6	Sandviken (R)	12	4	1	7	18	31	−13	9	Relegation to 3. divisjon
7	Nymark (R)	12	2	1	9	8	27	−19	5	Relegation to 3. divisjon

Source: rsssf.no
Rules for classification: 1) points; 2) goal difference; 3) number of goals scored.
(R) Relegated

=== Group Møre ===
Pos	Team	Pld	W	D	L	GF	GA	GD	Pts	Qualification or relegation
1	Kristiansund	14	9	3	2	37	18	+19	21	Qualification for the promotion play-offs
2	Hødd	14	10	1	3	36	19	+17	21	
3	Aalesund	14	7	4	3	24	20	+4	18	
4	Braatt	14	7	3	4	34	29	+5	17	
5	Langevåg	14	5	2	7	26	30	−4	12	
6	Molde	14	4	2	8	26	28	−2	10	
7	Skarbøvik (R)	14	3	2	9	29	38	−9	8	Relegation to 3. divisjon
8	Clausenengen (R)	14	2	1	11	12	42	−30	5	Relegation to 3. divisjon

Source: rsssf.no
Rules for classification: 1) points; 2) goal difference; 3) number of goals scored.
(R) Relegated

=== Group Trøndelag ===
Pos	Team	Pld	W	D	L	GF	GA	GD	Pts	Qualification or relegation
1	Rosenborg (O, P)	14	10	1	3	43	15	+28	21	Qualification for the promotion play-offs
2	Kvik	14	8	4	2	31	19	+12	20	
3	Freidig	14	8	1	5	37	31	+6	17	
4	Steinkjer	14	5	6	3	39	27	+12	16	
5	Nessegutten	14	7	2	5	25	17	+8	16	
6	Sverre	14	5	5	4	28	32	−4	15	
7	Ranheim (R)	14	1	3	10	20	44	−24	5	Relegation to 3. divisjon
8	Neset (R)	14	0	2	12	9	47	−38	2	Relegation to 3. divisjon

Source: rsssf.no
Rules for classification: 1) points; 2) goal difference; 3) number of goals scored.
(O) Play-off winners; (P) Promoted; (R) Relegated

=== Play-off Sørland/Vestland ===
- Vindbjart - Stavanger 2-3
- Årstad - Vindbjart 5-2
- Stavanger - Årstad 4-2

Pos	Team	Pld	W	D	L	GF	GA	GD	Pts	Qualification
1	Stavanger (O, P)	2	2	0	0	7	4	+3	4	Promotion to Hovedserien
2	Årstad	2	1	0	1	7	6	+1	2	Remained in Landsdelsserien
3	Vindbjart	2	0	0	2	4	8	−4	0	Remained in Landsdelsserien

Source: rsssf.no
Rules for classification: 1) points; 2) goal difference; 3) number of goals scored.
(O) Play-off winners; (P) Promoted

=== Play-off Møre/Trøndelag ===
- Rosenborg - Kristiansund 4 - 0
- Kristiansund - Rosenborg 0 - 5 (agg. 0 - 9)

Rosenborg promoted

== Third Division ==
=== District I ===
1. Askim           (Promoted)
2. Sprint/Jeløy
3. Hafslund
4. Ørje
5. Navestad
6. Gresvik
7. Tune
8. Mysen

=== District II, group A ===
1. Geithus         (Play-off)
2. Vestfossen
3. Strømsgodset
4. Spartacus
5. Åssiden
6. Kjelsås
7. Sørli
8. Ski

=== District II, group B ===
1. Drammens BK     (Play-off)
2. Aurskog
3. Grue
5. Liull
6. Slemmestad
7. Røa
8. Bjørkelangen
9. Aasen

=== District III, group A (Oplandene) ===
1. Fremad          (Play-off)
2. Mesna
3. Gjøvik SK
4. Lena
5. Hamarkameratene
6. Hamar IL
7. Stange
8. Biri

=== District III, group B1 (Sør-Østerdal) ===
1. Nybergsund      (Play-off)
2. Elverum
3. Ytre Rendal
4. Trysilgutten
5. Koppang
6. Innsats
7. Engerdal

=== District III, group B2 (Sør-Gudbrandsdal) ===
1. Kvam            (Play-off)
2. Fåvang
3. Follebu
4. Vinstra
5. Sør-Fron
6. Øyer 	(withdrew)

=== District III, group B3 (Nord-Gudbrandsdal) ===
1. Dovre           (Play-off)

Table unknown.

=== District IV, group A (Vestfold) ===
1. Ørn             	(Play-off)
2. Runar
3. Falk
4. Holmestrand
5. Tønsberg Turn
6. Tønsbergkam.
7. Teie
8. Borre

=== District IV, group B (Grenland) ===
1. Skiens-Grane    (Play-off)
2. Urædd
3. Brevik
4. Langesund
5. Herkules
6. Kragerø
7. Storm
8. Skidar

=== District IV, group B (Øvre-Telemark) ===
1. Rjukan          	(Play-off)
2. Heddal
3. Ulefoss
4. Drangedal
5. Skade
6. Sportsklubben 31

=== District V, group A1 (Aust-Agder) ===
1. Rygene          	(Play-off)
2. Risør
3. Dristug
4. Arendals BK
5. Tvedestrand
6. Froland 		(withdrew)

=== District V, group A2 (Vest-Agder) ===
1. Våg             	(Play-off)
2. Mandalskam.
3. Vigør
4. Torridal
5. Farsund
6. Lyngdal

=== District V, group B1 (Rogaland) ===
1. Jarl            		(Play-off)
2. Nærbø
3. Randaberg
4. Klepp
5. Varhaug
6. Orre

=== District V, group B2 (Rogaland) ===
1. Ulf             (Play-off)
2. Riska
3. Buøy
4. Ålgård
5. Vaulen
6. Åkra

=== District V, group C (Sunnhordland) ===
1. Stord           	(Play-off)
2. Odda
3. Rubbestadnes
4. Fonna
5. Solid
6. Halsnøy

=== District VI, group A (Bergen) ===
1. Trane           	(Play-off)
2. Djerv
3. Hardy
4. Fjellkameratene
5. Laksevåg
6. Baune
7. Ny-Krohnborg

=== District VI, group B (Midthordland) ===
1. Voss            		(Play-off)
2. Erdal
3. Follese
4. Kjøkkelvik
5. Florvåg
6. Arna
7. Dale (Dalekvam)

=== District VII, group A (Sunnmøre) ===
1. Herd            	(Play-off)
2. Aksla
3. Rollon
4. Ørsta
5. Velled./Ringen
6. Volda
7. Sykkylven
8. Spjelkavik

=== District VII, group B (Romsdal) ===
1. Træff           		(Play-off)
2. Nord-Gossen
3. Eidsvåg (Romsdal)
4. Eide
5. Åndalsnes
6. Isfjorden
7. Bud

=== District VII, group C (Nordmøre) ===
1. Framtid         (Play-off)
2. Dahle
3. Nordlandet
4. Sunndal
5. Goma
6. Todalen
7. Bjørn
8. Vågen

=== District VIII, group A (Sør-Trøndelag) ===
1. Løkken          (Play-off)
2. Orkanger
3. Vikavarvet
4. Svorkmo
5. Leik
6. Troll
7. Melhus
8. Flå

=== District VIII, group B (Trondheim og omegn) ===
1. Falken          		(Play-off)
2. Tryggkameratene
3. National
4. Trondheims/Ørn
5. Wing
6. Trond
7. NTHI
8. Nidar

=== District VIII, group C (Fosen) ===
1. Opphaug         	(Play-off)
2. Fevåg
3. Brekstad
4. Stadsbygd
5. Beian
6. Hasselvika
7. Nes IL 		(Disqualified)

=== District VIII, group D (Nord-Trøndelag/Namdal) ===
1. Fram (Skatval)  	(Play-off)
2. Stjørdals/Blink
3. Verdal
4. Namsos
5. Snåsa
6. Malm
7. Leksvik
8. Byafossen

=== District IX ===
1. Bodø/Glimt
2. Brønnøysund
3. Stålkameratene
4. Mo
5. Mosjøen
6. Vega

=== District X ===
1. Narvik/Nor
2. Harstad
3. Mjølner
4. Tromsø
5. Lia-Brage
6. Skarp

=== Play-off District II ===
- Drammen BK - Geithus 5 - 3
- Geithus - Drammens BK 4 - 1 (agg. 7 - 9)

Geithus promoted

=== Play-off District III ===
1. Kvam             	(Play-off)
- - - - - - - - - - - - - - - - - - -
2. Dovre
3. Nybergsund

- Fremad - Kbam 8 - 1
- Kvam - Fremad 1 - 3 (agg. 2 - 11)

Fremad promoted

=== Play-off District IV ===
- Ørn - Rjukan 6 - 0
- Skiens-Grane - Ørn 1 - 2
- Rjukan - Skiens-Grane 2 - 4

Pos	Team	Pld	W	D	L	GF	GA	GD	Pts	Promotion
1	Ørn	2	2	0	0	8	1	+7	4	Promoted
2	Skiens-Grane	2	1	0	1	5	4	+1	2	
3	Rjukan	2	0	0	2	2	10	−8	0	

=== Play-off District V ===
- Rygene - Våg 1 - 2
- Våg - Rygene 6 - 1 (agg. 8 - 2)

Våg promoted

- Jarl - Ulf 0 - 2
- Ulf - Jarl 2 - 1 (agg. 4 - 1)

Ulf promoted

- Jarl - Stord 2 - 2, after extra time (in Kopervik)
- Jarl - Stord 2 - 1 (in Haugesund)

Jarl promoted

=== Championship District V ===
- Våg - Ulf (not played)

=== Championship District VI ===
- Trane - Voss 4 - 1

Trane promoted

=== Play-off District VII ===
- Træff - Herd 0 - 5
- Herd - Framtid 4 - 0
- Framtid - Træff 6 - 0

Pos	Team	Pld	W	D	L	GF	GA	GD	Pts	Promotion
1	Herd	2	2	0	0	9	0	+9	4	Promoted
2	Framtid	2	1	0	1	6	7	−1	2	Promoted
3	Træff	2	0	0	2	3	11	−8	0	

=== Play-off District VIII ===
- Opphaug - Løkken 4 - 5
- Falken - Fram 3 - 1
- Opphaug - Falken 0 - 2
- Fram - Løkken 4 - 1
- Løkken - Falken 0 - 3
- Fram - Opphaug 5 - 3

Pos	Team	Pld	W	D	L	GF	GA	GD	Pts	Promotion
1	Falken	3	3	0	0	8	1	+7	6	Promoted
2	Fram (Skatval)	3	2	0	1	10	7	+3	4	Promoted
3	Løkken	3	1	0	2	6	11	−5	2	
4	Opphaug	3	0	0	3	7	12	−5	0	

== Norwegian Cup ==
=== Final ===
23 October 1960
13:15 CET (UTC+1)

Odd	3–3 (a.e.t.)	Rosenborg
Jacobsen 30'; Ødegaard 35' (pen.); Larsen 117'	Report	Hansen 42', 75', 108'

Ullevaal Stadion, Oslo
Attendance: 31,135
Referee: Harald Heltberg (Frigg)

Replay

30 October 1960
13:15 CET (UTC+1)

Rosenborg	3–2 (a.e.t.)	Odd
Hansen 30', 109'; Fornes 103'	Report	Ødegaard 61'; Larsen 106'

Ullevaal Stadion, Oslo
Attendance: 29,743
Referee: Arnold Nilsen (Nymark)

== Northern Norwegian Cup ==
=== Final ===
Mjølner	2–1	Harstad
	Report

== European Cups ==
=== Norwegian representatives ===
- Fredrikstad (Champions cup)

=== Preliminary round ===
- August 31: Fredrikstad - Ajax (Netherlands) 4 - 3
- September 7: Ajax - Fredrikstad 0 - 0 (agg. 3 - 4)

=== First round ===
- October 9: AGF Aarhus (Denmark) - Fredrikstad 3 - 0
- October 16: Fredrikstad - AGF Aarhus 0 - 1 (agg. 0 - 4)

== National team ==
Date	Venue	Opponent	Res.*	Competition	Norwegian goalscorers
May 26	Copenhagen	Denmark	0–3	NC series	
June 9	Oslo	Iceland	4–0	Friendly	Bjørn Borgen, Rolf Bjørn Backe, Gunnar Dybwad, Ragnar Nikolai Larsen
June 22	Oslo	Austria	1–2	Friendly	Rolf Bjørn Backe
August 28	Oslo	Finland	6–3	NC series	Rolf Birger Pedersen (2), Roald Jensen, Harald Hennum, Axel Berg (2)
September 18	Oslo	Sweden	3–1	NC series	Bjørn Borgen, Rolf Birger Pedersen, Harald Hennum
November 6	Dublin	Republic of Ireland	1–3	Friendly	Harald Hennum

Note: Norway's goals first
