= List of Norwegian football champions =

The Norwegian football champions (Norwegian: Seriemester i fotball) or Eliteserien champions, are the winners of the highest-level football league in Norway. Norgesserien was competed three times with eleven conferences and play-offs from 1937–38 to 1947–48. It was then replaced by the two-conference Hovedserien, which was replaced by the single-conference 1. divisjon in 1963. The top tier changed its name to the Tippeligaen in 1990, and to the current Eliteserien for 2017 and beyond. The winners of this title are not considered Norwegian football champions, as the title is reserved for the winners of the Norwegian Football Cup.

Sixteen clubs from ten cities have won the honor. With 26 titles Rosenborg is the most successful team, including 13 consecutive titles from 1992 through 2004. In the early years, Fredrikstad was highly successful, winning the first two titles and taking nine titles until 1960–61. Viking then took over dominance and rose to become the second-most winning team with their four consecutive titles from 1972 through 1975. The double—winning the league and cup the same season—has occurred fourteen times by six clubs.

At the end of the 1937–38 season, Fredrikstad were the first club to be crowned champions in the history of the championship. Rosenborg have won 26 titles, the most of any club. Fredrikstad are second with nine. Rosenborg dominated during the 1990s and 2000s, winning 13 consecutive league titles from 1992 to 2004. Fredrikstad secured all their titles before the league changed its format to a one-group top division in 1963. Third-most title winning team Viking dominated in the 1970s when they won five of their eight titles. Rosenborg and Viking are the only teams to have won the league title three or more consecutive times. All the clubs which have ever been crowned champions are still in existence today and all take part in the top six tiers of the Norwegian football league system - the football pyramid.

== Format ==
Attempts to create a national league were started in 1914–16 with the Test League, although this never held any official status. The first official league competition was the League of Norway, which started being contested in the 1937–38 season. It consisted of eleven double round robin conferences, each with six or seven teams, with the conference winners playing a two-legged, four-round play-off. Only two full seasons were contested before it was interrupted by World War II, but the league saw a final season be competed in 1947–48. The Main League started in the 1948–49 season, and saw two conferences each with eight teams. At the season end, the conference winners met for a two-legged final. In the 1959–60 and 1960–61, also bronze matches were played between the two conference runners-up.

The final season, in 1961–62, saw all 16 teams collected in a single league which was played over one and a half years. Starting with the 1963, ten team were collected into a single league, named the First Division. At the same time, the season changed from a winter to a summer league. From the 1972 season, teams from Northern Norway were also allowed to participate in the 1. divisjon, for the first time creating a pan-national league. The same season saw the number of teams increase from ten to twelve. The league was renamed to Tippeligaen in 1990, after the sponsor Norsk Tipping, and in 1997 a single-conference league was created below the top league for the first time. The Tippeligaen was expanded to 14 teams from the 1995 season and to 16 teams from the 2009 season.

== List ==
The following is a list of winners (gold), runners-up (silver) and third place (bronze) teams in the highest-level football league in Norway. It also shows teams that won the double.

Team won the double by winning the Norwegian Football Cup the same season

Season	League	Gold	Silver	Bronze	Winning manager
1937–38	Norgesserien	Fredrikstad	Lyn	—	
1938–39	Norgesserien	Fredrikstad (2)	Skeid	—	
1947–48	Norgesserien	Freidig	Sparta	—	
1948–49	Hovedserien	Fredrikstad (3)	Vålerenga	—	
1949–50	Hovedserien	Fram Larvik	Fredrikstad	—	
1950–51	Hovedserien	Fredrikstad (4)	Odd	—	
1951–52	Hovedserien	Fredrikstad (5)	Brann	—	
1952–53	Hovedserien	Larvik Turn	Skeid	—	
1953–54	Hovedserien	Fredrikstad (6)	Skeid	—	
1954–55	Hovedserien	Larvik Turn (2)	Fredrikstad	—	
1955–56	Hovedserien	Larvik Turn (3)	Fredrikstad	—	
1956–57	Hovedserien	Fredrikstad (7)	Odd	—	
1957–58	Hovedserien	Viking	Skeid	—	
1958–59	Hovedserien	Lillestrøm	Fredrikstad	—	
1959–60	Hovedserien	Fredrikstad (8)	Lillestrøm	Eik-Tønsberg	
1960–61	Hovedserien	Fredrikstad (9)	Eik-Tønsberg	Vålerenga	
1961–62	Hovedserien	Brann	Steinkjer	Fredrikstad	
1963	1. divisjon	Brann (2)	Lyn	Skeid	Oddvar Hansen
1964	1. divisjon	Lyn	Fredrikstad	Sarpsborg	John Sveinsson
1965	1. divisjon	Vålerenga	Lyn	Sarpsborg	Anton Ploderer
1966	1. divisjon	Skeid	Fredrikstad	Lyn	Brede Borgen
1967	1. divisjon	Rosenborg	Skeid	Lyn	Knut Næss
1968	1. divisjon	Lyn (2)	Rosenborg	Viking	Knut Osnes
1969	1. divisjon	Rosenborg (2)	Fredrikstad	Strømsgodset	George Curtis
1970	1. divisjon	Strømsgodset	Rosenborg	Ham-Kam	Einar Larsen
1971	1. divisjon	Rosenborg (3)	Lyn	Viking	Nils Arne Eggen; Tor Røste Fossen
1972	1. divisjon	Viking (2)	Fredrikstad	Strømsgodset	Kjell Schou-Andreassen
1973	1. divisjon	Viking (3)	Rosenborg	Start	Sverre Andersen
1974	1. divisjon	Viking (4)	Molde	Vålerenga	Stuart Williams
1975	1. divisjon	Viking (5)	Brann	Start	Olav Nilsen
1976	1. divisjon	Lillestrøm (2)	Mjøndalen	Brann	Joar Hoff
1977	1. divisjon	Lillestrøm (3)	Bodø/Glimt	Molde	Joe Hooley
1978	1. divisjon	Start	Lillestrøm	Viking	Karsten Johannessen
1979	1. divisjon	Viking (6)	Moss	Start	Tony Knapp
1980	1. divisjon	Start (2)	Bryne	Lillestrøm	Karsten Johannessen
1981	1. divisjon	Vålerenga (2)	Viking	Rosenborg	Leif Eriksen
1982	1. divisjon	Viking (7)	Bryne	Lillestrøm	Kjell Schou-Andreassen
1983	1. divisjon	Vålerenga (3)	Lillestrøm	Start	Gunder Bengtsson
1984	1. divisjon	Vålerenga (4)	Viking	Start	Gunder Bengtsson; Per Anders Sjøvold; Dag Vestlund
1985	1. divisjon	Rosenborg (4)	Lillestrøm	Vålerenga	Bjørn Hansen; Arne Dokken; Harald Sunde
1986	1. divisjon	Lillestrøm (4)	Mjøndalen	Kongsvinger	Tom Lund
1987	1. divisjon	Moss	Molde	Kongsvinger	Nils Arne Eggen
1988	1. divisjon	Rosenborg (5)	Lillestrøm	Molde	Nils Arne Eggen
1989	1. divisjon	Lillestrøm (5)	Rosenborg	Tromsø	David Hay
1990	Tippeligaen	Rosenborg (6)	Tromsø	Molde	Nils Arne Eggen
1991	Tippeligaen	Viking (8)	Rosenborg	Start	Benny Lennartsson
1992	Tippeligaen	Rosenborg (7)	Kongsvinger	Start	Nils Arne Eggen
1993	Tippeligaen	Rosenborg (8)	Bodø/Glimt	Lillestrøm	Nils Arne Eggen
1994	Tippeligaen	Rosenborg (9)	Lillestrøm	Viking	Nils Arne Eggen
1995	Tippeligaen	Rosenborg (10)	Molde	Bodø/Glimt	Nils Arne Eggen
1996	Tippeligaen	Rosenborg (11)	Lillestrøm	Viking	Nils Arne Eggen
1997	Tippeligaen	Rosenborg (12)	Brann	Strømsgodset	Nils Arne Eggen
1998	Tippeligaen	Rosenborg (13)	Molde	Stabæk	Trond Sollied
1999	Tippeligaen	Rosenborg (14)	Molde	Brann	Nils Arne Eggen
2000	Tippeligaen	Rosenborg (15)	Brann	Viking	Nils Arne Eggen
2001	Tippeligaen	Rosenborg (16)	Lillestrøm	Viking	Nils Arne Eggen
2002	Tippeligaen	Rosenborg (17)	Molde	Lyn	Nils Arne Eggen
2003	Tippeligaen	Rosenborg (18)	Bodø/Glimt	Stabæk	Åge Hareide
2004	Tippeligaen	Rosenborg (19)	Vålerenga	Brann	Ola By Rise
2005	Tippeligaen	Vålerenga (5)	Start	Lyn	Kjetil Rekdal
2006	Tippeligaen	Rosenborg (20)	Brann	Vålerenga	Per-Mathias Høgmo; Knut Tørum
2007	Tippeligaen	Brann (3)	Stabæk	Viking	Mons Ivar Mjelde
2008	Tippeligaen	Stabæk	Fredrikstad	Tromsø	Jan Jönsson
2009	Tippeligaen	Rosenborg (21)	Molde	Stabæk	Erik Hamrén
2010	Tippeligaen	Rosenborg (22)	Vålerenga	Tromsø	Erik Hamrén; Nils Arne Eggen
2011	Tippeligaen	Molde	Tromsø	Rosenborg	Ole Gunnar Solskjær
2012	Tippeligaen	Molde (2)	Strømsgodset	Rosenborg	Ole Gunnar Solskjær
2013	Tippeligaen	Strømsgodset (2)	Rosenborg	Haugesund	Ronny Deila
2014	Tippeligaen	Molde (3)	Rosenborg	Odd	Tor Ole Skullerud
2015	Tippeligaen	Rosenborg (23)	Strømsgodset	Stabæk	Kåre Ingebrigtsen
2016	Tippeligaen	Rosenborg (24)	Brann	Odd	Kåre Ingebrigtsen
2017	Eliteserien	Rosenborg (25)	Molde	Sarpsborg 08	Kåre Ingebrigtsen
2018	Eliteserien	Rosenborg (26)	Molde	Brann	Kåre Ingebrigtsen; Rini Coolen
2019	Eliteserien	Molde (4)	Bodø/Glimt	Rosenborg	Erling Moe
2020	Eliteserien	Bodø/Glimt	Molde	Vålerenga	Kjetil Knutsen
2021	Eliteserien	Bodø/Glimt (2)	Molde	Viking	Kjetil Knutsen
2022	Eliteserien	Molde (5)	Bodø/Glimt	Rosenborg	Erling Moe
2023	Eliteserien	Bodø/Glimt (3)	Brann	Tromsø	Kjetil Knutsen
2024	Eliteserien	Bodø/Glimt (4)	Brann	Viking	Kjetil Knutsen
2025	Eliteserien	Viking (9)	Bodø/Glimt	Tromsø	Bjarte Lunde Aarsheim Morten Jensen

== Total titles won ==
=== By club ===
The following is a breakdown of top three league positions by team and also presents the team's home city or town. Teams in bold compete in the Eliteserien as of the 2024 season.

Club	City	Gold	Silver	Bronze	Winning years
**Rosenborg**	Trondheim	26	7	5	1967, 1969, 1971, 1985, 1988, 1990, 1992, 1993, 1994, 1995, 1996, 1997, 1998, 1999, 2000, 2001, 2002, 2003, 2004, 2006, 2009, 2010, 2015, 2016, 2017, 2018
**Fredrikstad**	Fredrikstad	9	9	1	1937–38, 1938–39, 1948–49, 1950–51, 1951–52, 1953–54, 1956–57, 1959–60, 1960–61
**Viking**	Stavanger	9	2	10	1957–58, 1972, 1973, 1974, 1975, 1979, 1982, 1991, 2025
**Molde**	Molde	5	11	3	2011, 2012, 2014, 2019, 2022
Lillestrøm	Lillestrøm	5	8	3	1958–59, 1976, 1977, 1986, 1989
**Vålerenga**	Oslo	5	3	5	1965, 1981, 1983, 1984, 2005
**Bodø/Glimt**	Bodø	4	6	1	2020, 2021, 2023, 2024
**Brann**	Bergen	3	8	4	1961–62, 1963, 2007
Larvik Turn	Larvik	3	0	0	1952–53, 1954–55, 1955–56
Lyn	Oslo	2	4	4	1964, 1968
**Strømsgodset**	Drammen	2	2	3	1970, 2013
Start	Kristiansand	2	1	7	1978, 1980
Skeid	Oslo	1	5	1	1966
Stabæk	Bærum	1	1	4	2008
Moss	Moss	1	1	0	1987
Fram Larvik	Larvik	1	0	0	1949–50
Freidig	Trondheim	1	0	0	1947–48
**Tromsø**	Tromsø	0	2	5	—
Odd	Skien	0	2	2	—
**Bryne**	Bryne	0	2	0	—
Mjøndalen	Nedre Eiker	0	2	0	—
Kongsvinger	Kongsvinger	0	1	2	—
Eik-Tønsberg	Tønsberg	0	1	1	—
Sparta	Sarpsborg	0	1	0	—
Steinkjer	Steinkjer	0	1	0	—
Sarpsborg	Sarpsborg	0	0	2	—
**Ham-Kam**	Hamar	0	0	1	—
**Haugesund**	Haugesund	0	0	1	—
**Sarpsborg 08**	Sarpsborg	0	0	1	—

Titles won by club (%)
1. Rosenborg BK – 26 (32.5%)
2. Fredrikstad FK - 9 (11.2%)
3. Viking FK - 9 (11.2%)
4. Molde FK - 5 (6.25%)
5. Lillestrøm SK - 5 (6.25%)
6. Vålerenga Fotball - 5 (6.25%)
7. FK Bodø/Glimt - 4 (3.75%)
8. SK Brann - 3 (3.75%)
9. Larvik Turn - 3 (3.75%)
10. IK Start - 2 (2.50%)
11. Strømsgodset - 2 (2.50%)
12. Lyn 1896 FK - 2 (2.50%)
13. Other Teams - 5 (6.25%)

=== By region ===
Region	Number of titles	Clubs	Winning seasons
Eastern Norway	30	Fredrikstad (9), Lillestrøm (5), Vålerenga (5), Larvik Turn (3), Lyn (2), Strømsgodset (2), Fram Larvik (1), Moss (1), Skeid (1), Stabæk (1)	1937–38, 1938–39, 1948–49, 1949–50, 1950–51, 1951–52, 1952–53, 1953–54, 1954–55, 1955–56, 1956–57, 1958–59, 1959–60, 1960–61, 1964, 1965, 1966, 1968, 1970, 1976, 1977, 1981, 1983, 1984, 1986, 1987, 1989, 2005, 2008, 2013
Trøndelag	27	Rosenborg (26), Freidig (1)	1947–48, 1967, 1969, 1971, 1985, 1988, 1990, 1992, 1993, 1994, 1995, 1996, 1997, 1998, 1999, 2000, 2001, 2002, 2003, 2004, 2006, 2009, 2010, 2015, 2016, 2017, 2018
Western Norway	17	Viking (9), Molde (5), Brann (3)	1957–58, 1961–62, 1963, 1972, 1973, 1974, 1975, 1979, 1982, 1991, 2007, 2011, 2012, 2014, 2019, 2022, 2025
Northern Norway	4	Bodø/Glimt (4)	2020, 2021, 2023, 2024
Southern Norway	2	Start (2)	1978, 1980

=== By city / town ===
City / Town	Championships	Clubs	Winning seasons
Trondheim	27	Rosenborg (26), Freidig (1)	1947–48, 1967, 1969, 1971, 1985, 1988, 1990, 1992, 1993, 1994, 1995, 1996, 1997, 1998, 1999, 2000, 2001, 2002, 2003, 2004, 2006, 2009, 2010, 2015, 2016, 2017, 2018
Fredrikstad	9	Fredrikstad (9)	1937–38, 1938–39, 1948–49, 1950–51, 1951–52, 1953–54, 1956–57, 1959–60, 1960–61
Stavanger	9	Viking (9)	1957–58, 1972, 1973, 1974, 1975, 1979, 1982, 1991, 2025
Oslo	8	Vålerenga (5), Lyn (2), Skeid (1)	1964, 1965, 1966, 1968, 1981, 1983, 1984, 2005
Molde	5	Molde (5)	2011, 2012, 2014, 2019, 2022
Lillestrøm	5	Lillestrøm (5)	1958–59, 1976, 1977, 1986, 1989
Larvik	4	Larvik Turn (3), Fram Larvik (1)	1949–50, 1952–53, 1954–55, 1955–56
Bodø	4	Bodø/Glimt (4)	2020, 2021, 2023, 2024
Bergen	3	Brann (3)	1961–62, 1963, 2007
Kristiansand	2	Start (2)	1978, 1980
Drammen	2	Strømsgodset (2)	1970, 2013
Moss	1	Moss (1)	1987
Bærum	1	Stabæk (1)	2008
