= Trygve Andersen (footballer) =

Norwegian footballer (born 1934)

Personal information
- Full name: Trygve Andersen
- Date of birth: 10 July 1934 (age 92)
- Place of birth: Askøy Municipality, Norway
- Position: Midfielder

Senior career*
Years	Team	Apps	(Gls)
1950–1955	Florvåg	?	(?)
1956–1960	Årstad	?	(?)
1961–1966	Brann	76	(5)

International career
1957–1965	Norway	27	(1)
- * Club domestic league appearances and goals

Trygve Andersen (born 10 July 1934) is a retired Norwegian football player. He played as a midfielder, and represented the Norway national team on 27 occasions between 1957 and 1965, scoring one goal.

== Career statistics ==
Season	Club	Division	League		National Cup		League Cup		Europe		Total	
Season	Club	Division	Apps	Goals	Apps	Goals	Apps	Goals	Apps	Goals	Apps	Goals
1960–61	Brann	Landsdelsserien	5	0	1	0	—		—		6	0
1961–62	Brann	Hovedserien	27	3	10	0	—		—		37	3
1963	Brann	1. divisjon	18	2	3	2	—		—		21	4
1964	Brann	1. divisjon	18	0	5	1	—		—		23	1
1965	Brann	2. divisjon	5	0	1	0	—		—		6	0
1966	Brann	2. divisjon	3	0	2	1	—		—		5	1
Career total			76	5	22	4	0	0	0	0	98	9

== Honours ==
Brann

- 1. divisjon: 1961–62, 1963
