= All-time Eliteserien table =

Norwegian football club rankings

The All-time Eliteserien table is a ranking of Norwegian football clubs based on their all-time performance in Eliteserien, the highest division in Norwegian football. The table is calculated giving 3 points for a victory and 1 point for a draw, although historically games before the 1987 season only gave two points for a victory. The table starts with the establishment of a single national top division with the 1963 Norwegian First Division.

== Table ==
The table is up to date as of the end of the 2025 season.

†	Club in league as of 2026

All-time table
Rank	Club	S	P	W	D	L	GF	GA	Pts
1	Rosenborg†	58	1448	776	344	328	2916	1692	2672
2	Viking†	58	1432	621	372	439	2318	1921	2235
3	Molde†	47	1222	576	261	385	2132	1679	1989
4	Brann†	54	1340	544	314	482	2100	1994	1946
5	Lillestrøm†	49	1254	527	323	404	1988	1622	1903
6	Vålerenga†	51	1274	486	311	477	1941	1870	1766
7	Tromsø†	37	986	372	237	377	1388	1433	1353
8	Strømsgodset	37	958	360	210	388	1514	1585	1290
9	Bodø/Glimt†	30	804	340	189	275	1441	1216	1209
10	Start†	38	932	322	218	392	1351	1505	1184
11	Odd	28	768	302	175	291	996	1124	1155
12	Stabæk	26	728	283	176	269	1156	1102	1025
13	Fredrikstad†	27	618	230	153	235	900	916	843
14	Lyn	26	584	212	142	230	876	911	778
15	HamKam†	25	594	191	144	259	754	938	717
16	Haugesund	19	558	188	127	243	757	877	691
17	Moss	19	442	153	102	187	622	701	561
18	Kongsvinger	18	424	154	90	180	600	700	554
19	Aalesund†	16	464	146	106	212	591	786	544
20	Bryne	18	420	141	103	176	598	670	526
21	Sarpsborg 08†	14	420	136	116	168	585	670	524
22	Sogndal	18	468	124	124	220	566	830	496
23	Skeid	18	376	138	69	169	506	603	483
24	Mjøndalen	17	406	127	90	189	489	634	471
25	Sandefjord Fotball†	13	382	101	80	201	490	684	383
26	Kristiansund†	8	240	82	66	92	332	383	312
27	Sarpsborg FK	11	206	71	49	86	253	295	262
28	Frigg	8	148	45	41	62	176	255	176
29	Hødd	6	120	28	25	67	146	240	109
30	Steinkjer	5	94	27	24	433	122	166	105
31	Hønefoss	3	90	20	29	41	92	151	89
32	Sandnes Ulf	3	90	21	24	45	107	167	87
33	KFUM†	2	60	17	21	22	77	77	72
34	Fyllingen	3	66	17	19	30	65	106	70
35	Ranheim	2	60	19	12	29	79	105	69
36	Eik Tønsberg	3	66	19	12	35	79	125	69
37	Raufoss	3	62	11	15	36	59	117	48
38	Strindheim	2	48	9	10	29	54	114	37
39	Mjølner	2	44	7	9	28	33	83	30
40	Strømmen	2	44	6	9	29	39	80	27
41	Sandefjord BK	2	36	6	7	23	29	80	25
42	Jerv	1	30	5	5	20	30	69	20
43	Haugar	1	22	2	12	8	20	38	18
44	Lisleby	1	18	4	5	9	22	26	17
45	Gjøvik-Lyn	1	18	5	1	12	29	47	16
46	Vard Haugesund	1	22	2	9	11	21	36	15
47	Djerv 1919	1	22	3	4	15	17	59	13
48	Pors	1	18	3	1	14	10	46	10
49	Os	1	22	0	5	17	15	50	5
