= Leif Eriksen (footballer, born 1940) =

Norwegian footballer (1940–2024)

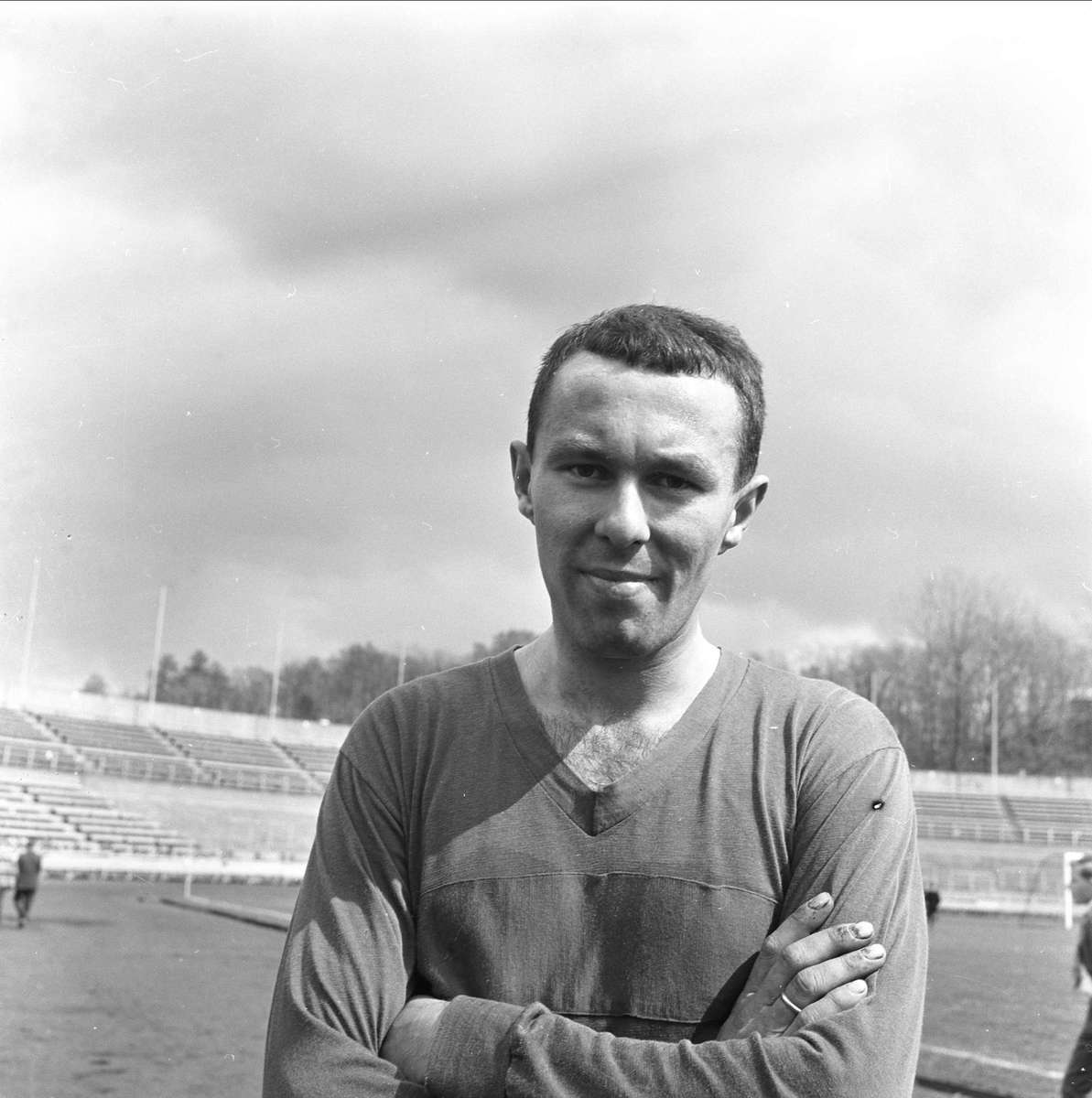
- Eriksen in 1963

Personal information
- Date of birth: 14 May 1940
- Place of birth: Oslo, German-occupied Norway
- Date of death: 31 January 2024 (aged 83)
- Place of death: Oslo, Norway
- Position: Forward

Senior career*
Years	Team	Apps	(Gls)
1958–1968	Vålerenga		
1969–1970	Eidsvold Turn		
1971–1972	Vålerenga		

International career
1960–1962	Norway U21	4	(1)
1961–1964	Norway B	5	(2)
1964–1968	Norway	4	(1)

Managerial career
- 1970: Eidsvold Turn
- 1971–1972: Vålerenga
- 1974–1975: Jevnaker IF
- 1976–1978: Skeid
- 1979–1981: Vålerenga
- 1982: Vålerenga
- * Club domestic league appearances and goals

Leif Eriksen (14 May 1940 – 31 January 2024) was a Norwegian football player and coach. A forward, he spent most of his career in Vålerenga, and became league top goalscorer in 1963. Eriksen represented Norway as a U21, B and senior international.

== Club career ==
Making his debut at 17 years of age in 1958, Eriksen played a total of 142 top-tier games for Vålerenga in which he scored 58 goals. This makes him Vålerenga's second-leading scorer all-time in the Norwegian Premier League behind Morten Berre who scored 62 goals.

In 1963, Eriksen scored 16 goals to become top scorer in the Norwegian top division. In 1965, he was a member of the Vålerenga side that became league champions for the first time in club history. In the championship-deciding game against Steinkjer, Eriksen fractured his foot, but was somehow able to finish the match (substitutions were at that time not allowed after the start of the second half).

== International career ==
Eriksen made his senior debut for Norway in a May 1964 friendly match against Ireland, coming on as a 20th-minute substitute for Roald Jensen, and earned a total of four caps, scoring one goal. His final international was an August 1968 Nordic Football Championship match against Finland.

== Coaching career ==
Eriksen left Vålerenga in 1969 to become player-manager at Eidsvold Turn. He returned to Vålerenga as player-manager two years later. After finishing his playing career, Eriksen returned to Vålerenga for a second spell as manager in 1979, and guided the club to victory in the 1980 Norwegian Cup, which was followed by winning Vålerenga's first league championship since his own playing days in 1981.

== Personal life ==
Leif Eriksen's son Bengt Eriksen also became a footballer who had two spells as a midfielder for Vålerenga between 1983 and 1993, and later became manager of Skeid. Bengt Eriksen also worked as a football pundit for TV 2 from 2003 to 2011.

== Death ==
Eriksen died on 31 January 2024, at the age of 83.
