= Oppedal =

Oppedal is a surname. It may refer to:

- Odd Oppedal (1936–2018), Norwegian footballer
- Oppedal, or Ytre Oppedal, a village and ferry terminal in Gulen Municipality in Vestland county, Norway
