= Sondre Jensen =

Norwegian footballer (born 1971)

Personal information
- Full name: Sondre Flemming Jensen
- Date of birth: 15 November 1971 (age 54)
- Place of birth: Bergen, Norway
- Position: Midfielder

Senior career*
Years	Team	Apps	(Gls)
1990–1991	Brann	5	(0)
- Fyllingen

International career
1989	Norway U18	1	(0)
- * Club domestic league appearances and goals

Sondre Jensen (born 15 November 1971) is a Norwegian former footballer who played as a midfielder.

Sondre Jensen debuted for SK Brann in the highest league in 1990 and played five times for the club in 1990 and 1991. He was also capped once for the Norway U18 national team in a game against Sweden in 1989. However he is most known for being the son of the Brann-legend Roald "Kniksen" Jensen.

He later played for Fyllingen. After his football career Sondre Jensen has worked as a postman for Posten Norge, the Norwegian postal service, in Loddefjord in Bergen.
