= 1961 Norwegian Football Cup =

Norgesmesterskapet i fotball for menn 1961

Tournament details
- Country: Norway
- Teams: 128 (main competition)

Final positions
- Champions: Fredrikstad (8th title)
- Runners-up: Haugar

The 1961 Norwegian Football Cup was the 56th season of the Norwegian annual knockout football tournament. The tournament was open for all members of NFF, except those from Northern Norway. Rosenborg were the defending champions, but they were eliminated by the second-tier team Brann in the quarterfinal.

The final was played at Ullevaal Stadion in Oslo on 22 October 1961, and was contested by the seven-times former winners Fredrikstad and the second-tier team Haugar who made their debut in the Norwegian Cup final. Fredrikstad won their eighth Norwegian Cup title with an impressive 7–0 win against Haugar in the final, and also secured the double for the third time.

== First round ==
Team 1	Score	Team 2
Askim	2–1	Kjelsås
Aurskog	9–2	Grorud
Brann	5–0	Nordnes
Braatt	5–3	Framtid
Brevik	1–0	Sandefjord BK
Bryne	0–1 (a.e.t.)	Stavanger
Buøy	1–2 (a.e.t.)	Ulf
Drafn	0–3	Asker
Eik	2–1	Skiold
Flekkefjord	3–4 (a.e.t.)	Egersund
Fram (Larvik)	1–0	Skiens-Grane
Fram (Skatval)	1–8	Rosenborg
Fredrikstad	2–0 (a.e.t.)	Hafslund
Freidig	6–0	Tryggkameratene
Fremad	6–0	Kvam
Geithus	2–0	Spartacus
Greåker	2–1 (a.e.t.)	Liull
Grue	0–2	Brumunddal
Hamar	0–2	Strømmen
Heggedal	1–3	Vestfossen
Hødd	4–0	Herd
Jerv	1–3	Vindbjart
Jevnaker	1–1 (a.e.t.)	Drammens BK
Jotun	2–0	Varegg
Kongsvinger	0–6	Gjøvik-Lyn
Langevåg	3–0	Skarbøvik
Lillestrøm	4–3	Raumnes & Årnes
Lyn	11–1	Sinsen
Løkken/Røros	0–4	Kvik (Trondheim)
Mjøndalen	4–1	Nordstrand
Nedenes	1–4	Vigør
Nymark	1–0	Fana
Odd	2–3	Urædd
Odda	1–4	Haugar
Os	1–0	Fjellkameratene
Pors	3–1	Borg
Rapid	4–0	Røa
Ranheim	3–1	Nessegutten
Raufoss	3–0	Lena
Redalen	1–2	Kapp
Runar	1–3	Lisleby
Sandaker	1–0	Østsiden
Selbak	3–1	Tistedalen
Skeid	3–0	Navestad
Ski	0–5	Vålerengen
Snøgg	1–3	Larvik Turn
Sprint/Jeløy	0–2	Sarpsborg
Sparta	0–1	Ørje
Start	2–2 (a.e.t.)	Vaag
Steinkjer	4–2	Verdal
Svorkmo	2–8	Brage
Sørfjell	8–3	Kragerø
Sverre	0–1 (a.e.t.)	Falken
Troll	1–3	Molde
Træff	2–2 (a.e.t.)	Kristiansund
Tønsbergkameratene	1–4	Moss
Vang	1–2	HamKam
Vard	6–0	Trane
Velledalen/Ringen	1–2	Aalesund
Vidar	3–2	Djerv 1919
Viking	3–0	Jarl
Ørn	5–1	Herkules
Årstad	1–0	Sogndal
Åssiden	1–2 (a.e.t.)	Frigg
Replay
Drammens BK	4–1	Jevnaker
Kristiansund	4–0	Træff
Vaag	1–2	Start

== Second round ==
Team 1	Score	Team 2
Asker	3–0	Fram (Larvik)
Brage	2–3	Raufoss
Brevik	0–6	Ørn
Brumunddal	2–1	Lyn
Drammens BK	2–6	Fredrikstad
Egersund	4–0	Start
Falken	3–5	Steinkjer
Fremad	1–2	Skeid
Frigg	5–0	Selbak
Gjøvik-Lyn	9–2	Rapid
HamKam	4–0	Mjøndalen
Haugar	3–0	Årstad
Kapp	0–2	Lillestrøm
Kristiansund	2–2 (a.e.t.)	Freidig
Kvik (Trondheim)	2–0	Braatt
Larvik Turn	0–1	Geithus
Lisleby	6–1	Ørje
Molde	0–1	Hødd
Moss	1–0	Sandaker
Nymark	0–4	Brann
Os	1–2	Vard
Ranheim	1–2	Rosenborg
Sarpsborg	5–0	Aurskog
Stavanger	6–1	Vidar
Strømmen	3–0	Jotun
Ulf	3–2 (a.e.t.)	Sørfjell
Urædd	0–2	Eik
Vestfossen	4–0	Greåker
Vigør	1–3	Viking
Vindbjart	5–1	Pors
Vålerengen	5–1	Askim
Aalesund	2–1	Langevåg
Replay
Freidig	2–1	Kristiansund

== Third round ==
Team 1	Score	Team 2
6 August 1961
Fredrikstad	5–2	Vestfossen
Moss	3–0	Vålerengen
Skeid	3–0	Egersund
HamKam	3–5	Sarpsborg
Lillestrøm	2–2 (a.e.t.)	Brumunddal
Raufoss	4–2	Lisleby
Geithus	1–3	Frigg
Ørn	2–5	Ulf
Eik	0–2	Asker
Viking	1–3	Haugar
Vard	4–2	Vindbjart
Brann	4–0	Stavanger
Hødd	0–1	Gjøvik-Lyn
Freidig	1–2	Strømmen
Rosenborg	1–0	Aalesund
Steinkjer	4–1	Kvik (Trondheim)
Replay: 9 August 1961
Brumunddal	3–4	Lillestrøm

== Fourth round ==
Team 1	Score	Team 2
27 August 1961
Frigg	2–0	Vard
Strømmen	0–3	Brann
Ulf	0–1 (a.e.t.)	Moss
Sarpsborg	3–3 (a.e.t.)	Raufoss
Steinkjer	6–1	Lillestrøm
Haugar	2–1	Skeid
Asker	0–1	Rosenborg
Gjøvik-Lyn	2–5 (a.e.t.)	Fredrikstad
Replay: 30 August 1961
Raufoss	1–0	Sarpsborg

== Quarter-finals ==
Team 1	Score	Team 2
10 September 1961
Fredrikstad	4–1	Moss
Rosenborg	2–3	Brann
Frigg	0–1	Haugar
Raufoss	2–5	Steinkjer

== Semi-finals ==
Team 1	Score	Team 2
1 October 1961
Brann	0–1	Fredrikstad
Haugar	1–0 (a.e.t.)	Steinkjer

== Final ==
22 October 1961

Fredrikstad	7–0	Haugar
Borgen 37'; Olsen 43', 77'; Kristoffersen 47', 63'; Pedersen 57'; Kristiansen 67' (pen.)	Report

Ullevaal Stadion, Oslo
Attendance: 30,273
Referee: Bjørn Borgersen (Mercantile)

== See also ==
- 1960–61 Norwegian Main League
- 1961 in Norwegian football
