= Odd Oppedal =

Norwegian footballer (1936–2018)

Personal information
- Full name: Odd Ove Oppedal
- Date of birth: 17 June 1936
- Place of birth: Bergen, Norway
- Date of death: 27 May 2018 (aged 81)
- Place of death: Bergen, Norway
- Position: Midfielder

Senior career*
Years	Team	Apps	(Gls)
1953–1964	Brann	126	(16)

International career
1962	Norway	1	(0)
- * Club domestic league appearances and goals

Odd Ove Oppedal (17 June 1936 – 27 May 2018) was a Norwegian footballer who played as a midfielder for Brann from 1953 to 1964. He played a total of 175 league and cup matches for the club, scoring 20 goals. He was captain of the Brann teams that won the Norwegian Premier League in 1962 and 1963.

Oppedal was capped once by Norway, in a 1962 friendly against Finland in his hometown Bergen.
