= Kjell Øyasæter =

Norwegian footballer (born 1950)

Personal information
- Date of birth: 8 February 1950 (age 76)
- Place of birth: Norway
- Position: Forward

Senior career*
Years	Team	Apps	(Gls)
1969–1970	Rosenborg	19	(0)
1970–1974	Brann	77	(31)
1975–1977	Rosenborg	59	(9)
Total		155	(40)
- * Club domestic league appearances and goals

Kjell Øyasæter (born 8 February 1950) is a Norwegian former footballer who played as a forward. He played 80 league matches for Rosenborg in 1969 and between 1975 and 1977, and 77 league matches for Brann between 1970 and 1971. Øyasæter became Rosenborg's top scorer in the 1977 season, with three goals.
