= Rolf Birger Pedersen =

Norwegian footballer (1939-2001)

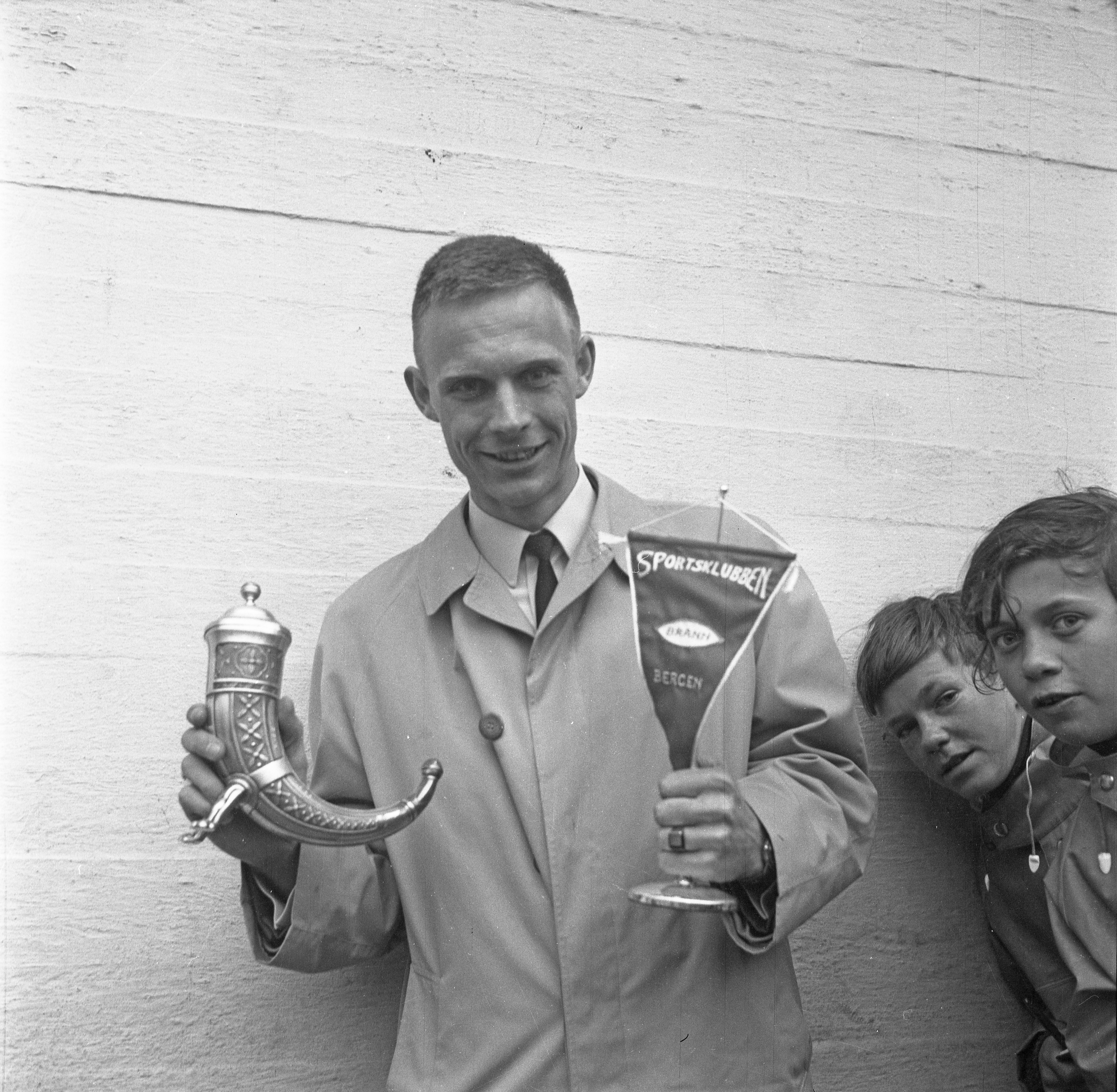
- Pedersen in 1969

Personal information
- Date of birth: 23 September 1939
- Place of birth: Bergen, Norway
- Date of death: 22 March 2001 (aged 61)
- Place of death: Bergen, Norway
- Position: Striker

Senior career*
Years	Team	Apps	(Gls)
1957–1972	Brann	335	(245)

International career
1958–1962	Norway	15	(5)
- * Club domestic league appearances and goals

Rolf Birger "Pesen" Pedersen (23 September 1939 - 22 March 2001) was a Norwegian footballer and football coach. He grew up near Brann Stadion, and later became one of Brann's most legendary players. He was also capped 15 times for the Norway national football team, scoring 5 goals.

Pesen was a creative and goalscoring midfielder, and is considered by many to be Brann's best player in their championship-seasons 1962 and 1963. Pedersen was particularly known for his remarkably hard shots. It is told that he once shot a goalkeeper into the goal, and he shot a keeper so hard that he fainted. He never reached the same level in the following seasons, possibly losing his motivation after being so successful in his younger years. Nevertheless, his track record in Brann is impressive, with 335 matches and a record high 245 goals in the red jersey.

After his retirement in 1972, Pesen continued his football life as head coach in many of the Bergen-based clubs in the lower divisions. Later he held many different positions in his old club Brann, culminating in his run as chairman of the club. In the late 1990s he was made responsible for Brann Stadion.

In 2000 Pesen was diagnosed with cancer, and for a while it looked like he would pull through, but he had a fallback, and died on 22 March 2001 at the age of 61.

== Career statistics ==
Season	Club	Division	League		National Cup		League Cup		Europe		Total	
Season	Club	Division	Apps	Goals	Apps	Goals	Apps	Goals	Apps	Goals	Apps	Goals
1956–57	Brann	Landsdelsserien	2	2	1	0	—		—		3	2
1957–58	Brann	Hovedserien	14	4	3	0	—		—		17	4
1958–59	Brann	Hovedserien	13	4	5	5	—		—		18	9
1959–60	Brann	Hovedserien	12	5	4	3	—		—		16	8
1960–61	Brann	Landsdelsserien	10	16	5	7	—		—		15	23
1961–62	Brann	Hovedserien	29	26	10	6	—		—		39	32
1963	Brann	1. divisjon	18	10	4	3	—		—		22	13
1964	Brann	1. divisjon	17	4	5	5	—		—		22	9
1965	Brann	2. divisjon	7	0	3	2	—		—		10	2
1966	Brann	2. divisjon	10	2	2	2	—		—		12	4
1967	Brann	2. divisjon	11	7	6	5	—		—		17	12
1968	Brann	1. divisjon	17	6	5	3	—		—		22	9
1972	Brann	1. divisjon	7	0	2	2	—		—		9	2
Career total			167	86	55	43	0	0	0	0	222	129

== Honours ==
- Norwegian top division: 1961–62, 1963

Individual

- Norwegian top division top scorer: 1961–62
