= Roald Jensen =

Norwegian footballer (1943–1987)

Personal information
- Date of birth: 11 January 1943
- Place of birth: Bergen, Norway
- Date of death: 6 October 1987 (aged 44)
- Place of death: Bergen, Norway
- Height: 1.70 m (5 ft 7 in)
- Position: Winger

Youth career
- 1953–1956: Dynamo
- 1956–1959: Brann

Senior career*
Years	Team	Apps	(Gls)
1960–1964	Brann	82	(51)
1965–1971	Heart of Midlothian	74	(19)
1971–1973	Brann	40	(9)

International career
1959–1960	Norway U19	2	(0)
1960	Norway U21	0	(0)
1960–1971	Norway	31	(5)
Medal record
SK Brann
Gold medal – first place	Norwegian Main League	1961–62
Gold medal – first place	Norwegian First Division	1963
Gold medal – first place	Norwegian Cup	1972
Heart of Midlothian F.C.
Silver medal – second place	Scottish Football League	1964–65
Silver medal – second place	Scottish Cup	1967–68
- * Club domestic league appearances and goals

Roald Jensen (11 January 1943 – 6 October 1987), nicknamed "Kniksen", was one of Norway's most celebrated football players. He played for Brann and Heart of Midlothian ("Hearts"). Knicksen is a local Bergen word meaning "juggler".

From an early age, Jensen was interested in football. He made his senior-team debut with Brann in 1960, while still only 17. He made his debut for the Norway national team the same year. Brann, with Jensen, won the league in 1961–62 and in 1963. After Brann's relegation in 1964, Jensen transferred to professional football in Scotland as Heart of Midlothian's first non-British player. While he was in Scotland, Jensen was unable to play for Norway, as the national team did not allow professional players at that time.

In 1971 Jensen returned to Brann and won the Norwegian championship (cup) with the club in 1972. Jensen retired from football after the 1973 season, when he was 30 years old. Jensen died in 1987 while playing football for Brann's old-boys' team. The Kniksen award, a prize that acclaims the best players in Norwegian football, is named after Jensen. In 1995 a statue of Jensen was erected outside Brann Stadion in Bergen.

== Early life ==
Roald Jensen was born in Bergen, Norway and grew up at Eidsvågsneset, Bergen. He was the son of architect Karl Ingolf Jensen and Kirsten Alice Rokne. His brother Kjell Jensen was also a footballer. As a child, Jensen played in the garden with a football for hours on end. In the SK Brann club biography, Gje meg en B - !, Boka om Brann, he describes a situation when he lost a small ball he got when he was four years old as the most unhappy time of his life. When he was ten years old, he was a founding member of a football club called Dynamo. In a game Dynamo won 22–0, Jensen scored 15 goals. Jensen was also a member of the buekorps ("Archery Brigade") Nordnæs Bataillon.

Jensen joined Brann at age 13, and dominated on the club's youth teams. Even as a youth player, he was noticed for his extreme technical skills. In 1959, SK Brann's junior team won the National Championship. The final at Brann Stadion was attended by 16,000 people.

Jensen finished high school and attended Bergen Technical School for two years, before he decided to concentrate on football.

== Senior career ==
=== Brann (1960–1964) ===
Jensen played his first senior match for Brann against Viking in April 1960. Because he was only 17, the club had to get a special permit in order to use him. He played all six of the remaining games of the 1959–60 league season, scoring two goals. Despite Roald Jensen's early success, Brann was relegated to the regional league Landsdelserien ("Regional series"). Roald Jensen played all eight games in the Landsdelserien in the fall of 1960. Roald Jensen soon became famous for his ball control and his accurate shots and passes. He became Norway's biggest sports star and a darling of the media, and earned the moniker "Kniksen", which translates into "juggler" in English.

After the 1961 spring season, Brann were promoted from Landsdelserien. The Norwegian League system was reorganized, and the autumn season was the start of a marathon campaign that lasted throughout 1962. Ten out of 30 games were played that autumn, and Jensen was on the pitch in all of the games, scoring five goals. Jensen also played in all of Brann's games in the Norwegian cup in 1961, which ended in October when Fredrikstad FK defeated them in the semifinal at Brann Stadion. The attendance for that game, 24,800 people, is to this day the record at Brann stadium. Jensen was in and out of the national team in 1961, but played seven games.

In the 1961–62 season, Jensen helped Brann win their first ever League Championship. In the book Godfoten, Nils Arne Eggen describes a situation where Jensen and Rolf Birger Pedersen, in the next-to-last game of the season against Rosenborg, took off their football shoes and humiliated their opponents by playing in their socks in a demonstration of superiority. However, the fact is disputed, and Pedersen denied that it ever happened. Brann won the game 4–1, with Jensen scoring one goal. Following that season, Jensen was named "striker of the year" by the newspaper Verdens Gang, and "player of the year" in Sportsboken, a sports yearbook published in Norway.

Brann repeated their success and won the Norwegian First Division in 1963.

=== Hearts (1965–1970) ===
Jensen transferred to Hearts after the 1964 season, while SK Brann was relegated, and debuted as the Jambo's first overseas international on 2 January 1965. He stayed with Hearts until 1971. His Hearts career was plagued by injuries, but he still played 170 games and scored 31 goals. An important goal was the extra-time winner against Morton in the 1968 Scottish Cup semifinal; however, the Jam Tarts lost the resultant final 3–1 to Dunfermline Athletic.

=== Back in Brann (1971–1973) ===
Jensen returned to Brann in the summer of 1971. He played the final nine games in the league that season, scoring two goals. Despite Jensen's return, Brann ended ninth—second from the bottom in the league. Usually this would mean relegation, but the league was expanded to 12 teams in 1972, and only one team was relegated.

Controversy started in the pre-season during 1972, when Jensen ended up in a fight with the referee during an indoor tournament in Haukelandshallen. Jensen was suspended for six months, unable to play half the season. Jensen returned after the summer break, and Brann ended up in the cup final, beating Rosenborg 1–0, 47 years after Brann's last cup triumph. Despite his long suspension, Jensen was named "footballer of the year" in Norway after playing a total of ten games and scoring three goals in league and cup.

Jensen played regularly through the 1973 season, and at age 30, he was expected to play for many years to come. After a quarrel on the pitch, manager Ray Freeman took away Jensen's status as team captain. However, the club's board insisted that Jensen was to remain captain. When Jensen also ended up in conflict with new manager Billy Elliott, he and his brother Kjell chose to retire. His last game as a Brann player was in the European Cup Winners Cup, against Glentoran, on 7 November 1973.

In total, Jensen played 244 games for Brann, and is regarded as the club's greatest player ever.

=== National team ===
Jensen made his international debut for Norway in a friendly against Austria on 22 June 1960, aged just 17 years and 161 days, which makes him the third-youngest player to have appeared for Norway's senior national team. Although the selection committee was skeptical of him, due to his young age, Jensen earned excellent reviews for his performance against Austria, and kept his place in the team. Jensen scored his first international goal, becoming the Norway team's youngest-ever goalscorer, in his second game, against Finland on 28 August 1960 – a game Norway won 6–3. However, his breakthrough for Norway was in a game against Sweden on 18 September 1960, where Jensen and his Brann teammate Rolf Birger Pedersen, charmed the entire country with their magnificent football and shy appearance. Norway won the game 3–1.

Jensen remained a regular in the Norway side throughout the early 1960s, and on 7 November 1963, following a game against Scotland, he became the youngest-ever player to receive the Gold Watch for having played 25 senior international games. However, due to the Norwegian FA's self-imposed "amateur rule", Jensen became ineligible for the national team when he joined Hearts in 1964, and did not play for his country again until 1969, when the amateur rule was lifted. In total, Jensen played 31 international games for Norway, and scored five goals, earning his 31st and final cap in a match against Hungary on 27 October 1971.

== Outside football ==
Roald Jensen married Eva Sofie Jetmundsen on 15 July 1967. Before his comeback for Brann in 1971, Jensen worked for Fiskernes Bank in Bergen. After he retired from football, he continued to work in Bergen's banking and insurance sector.

Jensen played for Brann's various old-boys' teams. He died of heart failure on 6 October 1987, while on the football field training with Brann's old-boys' team Gamlekara. Thousands attended his funeral in Fyllingsdalen's church. In 1990 and 1991, Jensen's son Sondre Jensen made five appearances for SK Brann. He is the father-in-law of the Norwegian football manager and former player Roy Wassberg, and the grandfatherfather of the current player Niklas Jensen Wassberg.

A bronze statue of Kniksen made by the Norwegian sculptor Per Ung was installed outside Brann Stadion in 1995. In 2008, a large area outside the two new stands at Brann Stadion was named "Kniksens plass" after Roald Jensen. This also became SK Brann's new address.

== The Kniksen award ==
In Roald Jensen's honour, the Kniksen award is given to Norwegian football players after each football season. The award is handed out by Norsk Toppfotball, and has been awarded annually since 1990. There are separate awards for best goalkeeper, defender, midfielder, striker, manager, and referee. It is recognized as Norwegian football's most prestigious award.

== Career statistics ==
Appearances and goals by club, season and competition
Club	Season	League			National cup		League cup		Europe		Total	
Club	Season	Division	Apps	Goals	Apps	Goals	Apps	Goals	Apps	Goals	Apps	Goals
Brann	1959–60	Hovedserien	14	8	2	1	—		—		16	9
Brann	1960–61	Landsdelsserien	12	12	4	3	—		—		16	15
Brann	1961–62	Hovedserien	30	24	10	7	—		—		40	31
Brann	1963	1. divisjon	18	10	4	6	—		—		22	16
Brann	1964	1. divisjon	16	3	4	5	—		—		20	8
Brann	Total		90	57	24	22	0	0	0	0	114	69
Heart of Midlothian	1964–65	Scottish Division One	15	3	3	0	—		—		18	3
Heart of Midlothian	1965–66	Scottish Division One	5	0	0	0	4	0	—		9	0
Heart of Midlothian	1966–67	Scottish Division One	7	0	5	1	—		—		12	1
Heart of Midlothian	1967–68	Scottish Division One	15	5	6	3	1	1	—		22	9
Heart of Midlothian	1968–69	Scottish Division One	22	7	2	0	2	0	—		26	7
Heart of Midlothian	1969–70	Scottish Division One	5	3	0	0	—		—		5	3
Heart of Midlothian	1970–71	Scottish Division One	5	1	1	0	4	1	—		10	2
Heart of Midlothian	Total		74	19	17	4	11	2	0	0	102	25
Brann	1971	1. divisjon	9	2	0	0	—		—		9	2
Brann	1972	1. divisjon	10	3	4	0	—		—		14	3
Brann	1973	1. divisjon	21	4	5	1	—		4	1	30	6
Brann	Total		40	9	9	1	0	0	4	1	53	11
Career total			204	85	50	27	11	2	4	1	269	115
