= Arild Hetleøen =

Norwegian footballer (1942–2023)

Personal information
- Date of birth: 28 December 1942
- Place of birth: Bergen, German-occupied Norway
- Date of death: 16 September 2023 (aged 80)
- Place of death: Bergen, Norway
- Position: Central defender

Senior career*
Years	Team	Apps	(Gls)
1960–1963	Brann	27	(8)
1964	Bodø/Glimt		
1965–1972	Brann	100	(1)

International career
1970–1971	Norway	4	(0)
- * Club domestic league appearances and goals

Arild Hetleøen (28 December 1942 – 16 September 2023) was a Norwegian footballer. Originally an inside forward who was later converted to central defender, Hetleøen spent the majority of his football career with his hometown club Brann, winning Norwegian league titles in 1962 and 1963. In total, he played 127 league games for Brann, scoring nine goals. In 1964, Hetleøen played for Bodø/Glimt while stationed in Bodø during his military service.

Hetleøen played four matches for the Norway national team, making his debut against Denmark in September 1970 when he came on as a substitute for Thor Spydevold. His last international appearance came nine months later, in a European Championship qualifier against Bulgaria in June 1971.

Arild Hetleøen died on 16 September 2023, at the age of 80.
