= Rolf Bjørn Backe =

Norwegian footballer (1934-2012)

- Born: 1934; Gjøvik
- Died: 2012 (aged 77–78)
- Occupation: Footballer

Rolf Bjørn Backe (21 November 1934 – 11 September 2012) was a Norwegian footballer, bandy player, and business person. He was born in Gjøvik. He became the Norwegian cup champion with the club SK Gjøvik-Lyn in 1962, scoring twice in the final. He played 18 matches for the national football team.
