= Roald Paulsen =

Norwegian footballer (1938–2021)

Personal information
- Date of birth: 6 November 1938
- Date of death: 26 July 2021 (aged 92)

International career
Years	Team	Apps	(Gls)
1962	Norway	1	(0)

Roald Paulsen (6 November 1938 – 26 July 2021) was a Norwegian footballer. He played in one match for the Norway national football team in 1962. Paulsen died on 26 July 2021, at the age of 82.
