= 1966 Norwegian Second Division =

2. divisjon
- Season: 1966
- Champions: Strømsgodset (Group A); Rosenborg (Group B)
- Promoted: Strømsgodset; Rosenborg
- Relegated: Sandefjord; Lillestrøm; Baune; Falken

The 1966 2. divisjon was a Norwegian second-tier football league season.

The league was contested by 16 teams, divided into two groups; A and B. The winners of group A and B were promoted to the 1967 1. divisjon. The two lowest placed teams in both groups were relegated to the 3. divisjon.

== Overview ==
=== Summary ===
Strømsgodset won group A with 20 points. Rosenborg won group B with 25 points. Both teams were promoted to the 1967 1. divisjon.

== Tables ==
=== Group A ===
| Pos | Team | Pld | W | D | L | GF | GA | GD | Pts | Promotion, qualification or relegation |
|---|---|---|---|---|---|---|---|---|---|---|
| 1 | Strømsgodset (C, P) | 14 | 9 | 2 | 3 | 51 | 27 | +24 | 20 | Promotion to First Division |
| 2 | Aurskog | 14 | 8 | 4 | 2 | 41 | 24 | +17 | 20 | |
| 3 | Gjøvik-Lyn | 14 | 6 | 3 | 5 | 36 | 29 | +7 | 15 | |
| 4 | Eik | 14 | 6 | 3 | 5 | 25 | 28 | −3 | 15 | |
| 5 | Snøgg | 14 | 5 | 3 | 6 | 30 | 32 | −2 | 13 | |
| 6 | Raufoss | 14 | 4 | 4 | 6 | 24 | 27 | −3 | 12 | |
| 7 | Sandefjord (R) | 14 | 4 | 4 | 6 | 21 | 30 | −9 | 12 | Relegation to Third Division |
| 8 | Lillestrøm (R) | 14 | 1 | 3 | 10 | 25 | 56 | −31 | 5 | Relegation to Third Division |

Source: rsssf.no
Rules for classification: 1) points; 2) goal difference; 3) number of goals scored.
(C) Champions; (P) Promoted; (R) Relegated

=== Group B ===
| Pos | Team | Pld | W | D | L | GF | GA | GD | Pts | Promotion, qualification or relegation |
|---|---|---|---|---|---|---|---|---|---|---|
| 1 | Rosenborg (C, P) | 14 | 12 | 1 | 1 | 38 | 11 | +27 | 25 | Promotion to First Division |
| 2 | Viking | 14 | 8 | 2 | 4 | 24 | 20 | +4 | 18 | |
| 3 | Brann | 14 | 7 | 2 | 5 | 19 | 13 | +6 | 16 | |
| 4 | Nidelv | 14 | 6 | 2 | 6 | 28 | 24 | +4 | 14 | |
| 5 | Bryne | 14 | 6 | 1 | 7 | 21 | 23 | −2 | 13 | |
| 6 | Start | 14 | 4 | 3 | 7 | 26 | 23 | +3 | 11 | |
| 7 | Baune (R) | 14 | 4 | 0 | 10 | 17 | 36 | −19 | 8 | Relegation to Third Division |
| 8 | Falken (R) | 14 | 3 | 1 | 10 | 20 | 43 | −23 | 7 | Relegation to Third Division |

Source: rsssf.no
Rules for classification: 1) points; 2) goal difference; 3) number of goals scored.
(C) Champions; (P) Promoted; (R) Relegated
