= 1960–61 Landsdelsserien =

Landsdelsserien
- Season: 1960–61
- Promoted: Ørn; Frigg; Brann; Steinkjer
- Relegated: Selbak; Askim; Fremad Lillehammmer; Sandaker; Geithus; Våg; Vidar; Djerv 1919; Egersund; Herd; Framtid; Fram

The 1960–61 Landsdelsserien was a Norwegian second-tier football league season.

The league was contested by 54 teams, divided into a total of seven groups from four districts; Østland/Søndre, Østland/Nordre, Sørland/Vestre and Møre/Trøndelag. The two group winners in the Østland districts, Ørn and Frigg promoted directly to the 1961–62 Hovedserien. The other five group winners qualified for promotion play-offs to compete for two spots in the following season's top flight. Brann and Steinkjer won the play-offs and were promoted.

== Tables ==
=== District Østland/Søndre ===
Pos	Team	Pld	W	D	L	GF	GA	GD	Pts	Promotion or relegation
1	Ørn (P)	14	9	1	4	45	23	+22	19	Promotion to Hovedserien
2	Sarpsborg	14	8	3	3	26	13	+13	19	
3	Moss	14	7	4	3	27	19	+8	18	
4	Fram	14	7	2	5	24	21	+3	16	
5	Pors	14	7	2	5	19	30	−11	16	
6	Sparta	14	5	1	8	18	25	−7	11	
7	Selbak (R)	14	3	2	9	23	31	−8	8	Relegation to 3. divisjon
8	Askim (R)	14	2	1	11	11	31	−20	5	Relegation to 3. divisjon

Source: rsssf.no
Rules for classification: 1) points; 2) goal difference; 3) number of goals scored.
(P) Promoted; (R) Relegated

=== District Østland/Nordre ===
Pos	Team	Pld	W	D	L	GF	GA	GD	Pts	Promotion or relegation
1	Frigg (P)	14	10	1	3	38	14	+24	21	Promotion to Hovedserien
2	Mjøndalen	14	7	3	4	35	28	+7	17	
3	Asker	14	6	4	4	26	17	+9	16	
4	Gjøvik-Lyn	14	8	0	6	30	30	0	16	
5	Raufoss	14	5	5	4	28	19	+9	15	
6	Fremad (R)	14	4	2	8	25	38	−13	10	
7	Sandaker (R)	14	3	3	8	18	31	−13	9	Relegation to 3. divisjon
8	Geithus (R)	14	3	2	9	20	43	−23	8	Relegation to 3. divisjon

Source: rsssf.no
Rules for classification: 1) points; 2) goal difference; 3) number of goals scored.
(P) Promoted; (R) Relegated

=== District Sørland/Vestland ===
==== Group A ====
Pos	Team	Pld	W	D	L	GF	GA	GD	Pts	Qualification or relegation
1	Start	12	11	1	0	40	9	+31	23	Qualification for the promotion play-offs
2	Sørfjell	12	8	2	2	34	22	+12	18	
3	Jerv	12	6	1	5	26	35	−9	13	
4	Vindbjart	12	5	0	7	28	23	+5	10	
5	Flekkefjord	12	3	2	7	19	29	−10	8	
6	Nedenes	12	3	1	8	25	31	−6	7	
7	Våg (R)	12	2	1	9	13	36	−23	5	Qualification for the relegation play-offs

Source: rsssf.no
Rules for classification: 1) points; 2) goal difference; 3) number of goals scored.
(R) Relegated

==== Group B ====
Pos	Team	Pld	W	D	L	GF	GA	GD	Pts	Qualification or relegation
1	Ulf	14	7	5	2	26	10	+16	19	Qualification for the promotion play-offs
2	Vard	14	7	5	2	22	9	+13	19	
3	Bryne	14	8	2	4	28	14	+14	18	
4	Haugar	14	7	4	3	32	19	+13	18	
5	Jarl	14	6	1	7	26	33	−7	13	
6	Vidar (R)	14	3	6	5	14	19	−5	12	Relegation to 3. divisjon
7	Djerv 1919 (R)	14	2	4	8	10	28	−18	8	Relegation to 3. divisjon
8	Egersund (R)	14	1	3	10	7	33	−26	5	Relegation to 3. divisjon

Source: rsssf.no
Rules for classification: 1) points; 2) goal difference; 3) number of goals scored.
(R) Relegated

==== Group C ====
Pos	Team	Pld	W	D	L	GF	GA	GD	Pts	Qualification or relegation
1	Brann (O, P)	12	9	3	0	45	9	+36	21	Qualification for the promotion play-offs
2	Os	12	7	2	3	30	20	+10	16	
3	Varegg	12	7	1	4	24	17	+7	15	
4	Årstad	12	4	3	5	9	13	−4	11	
5	Fana	12	4	1	7	20	24	−4	9	
6	Trane	12	1	5	6	6	25	−19	7	
7	Nordnes	12	1	3	8	6	32	−26	5	

Source: rsssf.no
Rules for classification: 1) points; 2) goal difference; 3) number of goals scored.
(O) Play-off winners; (P) Promoted

=== District Møre/Trøndelag ===
==== Møre ====
Pos	Team	Pld	W	D	L	GF	GA	GD	Pts	Qualification or relegation
1	Langevåg	14	12	0	2	63	15	+48	24	Qualification for the promotion play-offs
2	Hødd	14	10	2	2	53	20	+33	22	
3	Aalesund	14	9	1	4	32	23	+9	19	
4	Braatt	14	6	2	6	25	33	−8	14	
5	Molde	14	4	5	5	26	29	−3	13	
6	Kristiansund	14	3	5	6	25	31	−6	11	
7	Herd (R)	14	3	3	8	18	32	−14	9	Relegation to 3. divisjon
8	Framtid (R)	14	0	0	14	9	68	−59	0	Relegation to 3. divisjon

Source: rsssf.no
Rules for classification: 1) points; 2) goal difference; 3) number of goals scored.
(R) Relegated

==== Trøndelag ====
Pos	Team	Pld	W	D	L	GF	GA	GD	Pts	Qualification or relegation
1	Steinkjer (O, P)	14	13	0	1	63	18	+45	26	Qualification for the promotion play-offs
2	Kvik	14	10	1	3	32	11	+21	21	
3	Brage	14	7	2	5	21	19	+2	16	
4	Freidig	14	5	5	4	27	22	+5	15	
5	Nessegutten	14	6	1	7	22	32	−10	13	
6	Falken	14	3	2	9	14	26	−12	8	
7	Sverre	14	2	3	9	16	43	−27	7	
8	Fram (R)	14	3	0	11	28	52	−24	6	Relegation to 3. divisjon

Source: rsssf.no
Rules for classification: 1) points; 2) goal difference; 3) number of goals scored.
(O) Play-off winners; (P) Promoted; (R) Relegated

== Promotion play-offs ==
Sørland/Vestland
Results

- Brann 1–1 Ulf
- Ulf 2–2 Start
- Start 1–3 Brann

Pos	Team	Pld	W	D	L	GF	GA	GD	Pts	Qualification
1	Brann (O, P)	2	1	1	0	4	2	+2	3	Promotion to Hovedserien
2	Ulf	2	0	2	0	3	3	0	2	Remained in Landsdelsserien
3	Start	2	0	1	1	3	5	−2	1	Remained in Landsdelsserien

Source: rsssf.no
Rules for classification: 1) points; 2) goal difference; 3) number of goals scored.
(O) Play-off winners; (P) Promoted

Møre/Trøndelag

- Langevåg 3–3 Steinkjer
- Steinkjer 3–2 Langevåg

Steinkjer won 6–5 on aggregate and were promoted to Hovedserien.

== Relegation play-offs ==
- Våg 0–5 Vigør

Vigør won 5–0 on aggregate and were promoted to Landsdelsserien. Våg were relegated to 3. divisjon.
