= 1963 Norwegian First Division =

19th season of top-tier football league in Norway

1. divisjon
- Season: 1963
- Dates: 26 April – 13 October
- Champions: Brann; 2nd title
- Relegated: Steinkjer; Gjøvik-Lyn
- European Cup: Lyn
- Cup Winners' Cup: Skeid
- Inter-Cities Fairs Cup: Vålerengen
- Matches played: 90
- Goals scored: 336 (3.73 per match)
- Top goalscorer: Leif Eriksen (16 goals)
- Biggest home win: Brann 8–1 Frigg (4 May 1963)
- Biggest away win: Frigg 0–7 Vålerengen (19 May 1963)
- Highest scoring: Brann 8–1 Frigg (4 May 1963)
- Longest winning run: Brann; Lyn; Skeid (4 games)
- Longest unbeaten run: Lyn (10 games)
- Longest winless run: Gjøvik-Lyn (10 games)
- Longest losing run: Gjøvik-Lyn (6 games)
- Highest attendance: 20,897; Brann 1–1 Fredrikstad (19 May 1963)
- Lowest attendance: 2,375; Gjøvik-Lyn 2–1 Sarpsborg FK (13 October 1963)
- Average attendance: 7,871

The 1963 1. divisjon was the 19th completed season of top division football in Norway. This was the first regular season when all the top flight teams played in the same group.

== Overview ==
It was contested by 10 teams, and Brann won their second consecutive championship title.

Lyn lead the table after 9 games, and qualified for the 1963–64 European Cup.

Steinkjer and Gjøvik-Lyn finished 9th and 10th and were relegated to the 2. divisjon.

== Teams and locations ==
Note: Table lists in alphabetical order.

Team	Ap.	Location
Brann	14	Bergen
Fredrikstad	18	Fredrikstad
Frigg	8	Oslo
Gjøvik-Lyn	4	Gjøvik
Lyn	11	Oslo
Sarpsborg FK	13	Sarpsborg
Skeid	17	Oslo
Steinkjer	6	Steinkjer
Vålerengen	14	Oslo
Viking	18	Stavanger

== League table ==
Pos	Team	Pld	W	D	L	GF	GA	GD	Pts	Qualification or relegation
1	Brann (C)	18	10	4	4	46	27	+19	24	
2	Lyn	18	10	3	5	38	28	+10	23	Qualification for the European Cup first round
3	Skeid	18	9	2	7	41	26	+15	20	Qualification for the Cup Winners' Cup first round
4	Fredrikstad	18	7	6	5	32	25	+7	20	
5	Frigg	18	6	6	6	31	40	−9	18	
6	Sarpsborg FK	18	6	5	7	26	35	−9	17	
7	Viking	18	6	5	7	26	37	−11	17	
8	Vålerengen	18	7	2	9	44	37	+7	16	Qualification for the Inter-Cities Fairs Cup first round
9	Steinkjer (R)	18	5	4	9	23	34	−11	14	Relegation to Second Division
10	Gjøvik-Lyn (R)	18	5	1	12	29	47	−18	11	Relegation to Second Division

Source: NIFS
Rules for classification: 1) points; 2) goal difference; 3) number of goals scored.
(C) Champions; (R) Relegated

== Results ==
Home \ Away	SKB	FFK	FRI	GJØ	LYN	SAR	SKD	SFK	VIK	VIF
Brann		1–1	8–1	3–1	0–6	7–1	2–1	3–0	2–1	3–1
Fredrikstad	1–1		2–0	1–2	4–0	3–3	1–0	4–2	4–1	1–3
Frigg	4–3	1–1		1–0	0–3	2–2	3–3	1–1	5–1	0–7
Gjøvik-Lyn	2–0	2–2	1–4		2–3	2–1	1–4	1–2	5–1	0–7
Lyn	1–3	2–1	2–2	1–3		2–0	2–1	3–3	0–2	5–0
Sarpsborg	1–1	3–1	2–1	3–0	2–0		1–3	1–1	1–2	1–0
Skeid	2–1	0–1	3–0	5–2	1–1	4–2		3–2	4–1	1–3
Steinkjer	0–3	0–1	1–3	2–0	1–2	0–1	1–0		2–2	2–1
Viking	1–1	2–1	0–0	3–2	2–3	1–1	1–0	1–3		2–2
Vålerengen	2–4	2–2	0–3	4–3	1–2	5–0	1–6	4–0	1–2	

Source: NIFS.no
Legend: Blue = home team win; Yellow = draw; Red = away team win.

== Season statistics ==
=== Top scorer ===
- Leif Eriksen, Vålerengen – 16 goals

=== Attendances ===
Pos	Team	Total	High	Low	Average	Change
1	Brann	140,918	20,897	10,750	15,658	n/a
2	Vålerengen	88,301	16,600	4,973	9,811	n/a
3	Skeid	81,597	18,534	4,518	9,066	n/a
4	Viking	67,346	10,600	5,000	7,483	n/a
5	Lyn	67,117	13,947	2,684	7,457	n/a
6	Fredrikstad	62,889	12,000	4,000	6,988	n/a
7	Frigg	59,281	10,855	2,519	6,587	n/a
8	Steinkjer	50,313	8,000	3,500	5,590	n/a
9	Gjøvik-Lyn	48,037	10,437	1,500	5,337	n/a
10	Sarpsborg FK	42,569	7,500	1,800	4,730	n/a
	League total	708,368	20,897	1,500	7,871	n/a

Source: nifs.no
