= Steinkjer FK =

Norwegian football club

Steinkjer F.K.
- Full name: Steinkjer Fotballklubb
- Nickname: SFK
- Founded: 29 May 1910; 115 years ago
- Ground: Guldbergaunet stadion Steinkjer
- Capacity: 5000
- Manager: Geir Jenshus
- League: 4. divisjon
- 2024: 4. divisjon, 6th of 12
Home colours	Away colours

Steinkjer FK is a Norwegian football club from the town of Steinkjer, currently playing in the 4. divisjon, the fifth tier in the Norwegian league system, after being relegated from 3. divisjon in 2023. The club was founded in 1910. Steinkjer played in the top league in 1937–38, 1938–39, 1956–57, 1957–58, 1961–62, 1963, 1965, 1966, 1967 and 1978. Their strongest performance in the league was in the 1961–62 season when they finished second, only beaten by Brann.

== Home ground ==
Their home ground is Guldbergaunet Stadion. The record attendance through all times is 13,997 against Lyn in the Norwegian cup semi final 1970. This is an artificial pitch, which was ready in May 2003.

== Notable former managers ==
- (England) Bill Foulkes
- (Republic of Ireland) Tony Dunne

In 1982, Bill Foulkes (ex-Manchester United) was succeeded as manager of Steinkjer FK by his former United team-mate Tony Dunne. Tony Dunne had previously been an assistant manager for Bolton Wanderers, and had made numerous appearances for the Republic of Ireland national football team, captaining the side on four occasions.

== Recent history ==
Season		Pos.	Pl.	W	D	L	GS	GA	P	Cup	Notes
2006	2. divisjon	9	26	11	3	12	56	59	36	Second round	
2007	2. divisjon	11	26	9	3	14	49	75	30	Second round	
2008	2. divisjon	11	26	10	1	15	56	68	31	Second round	
2009	2. divisjon	12	26	8	5	13	47	70	29	Second round	
2010	2. divisjon	9	26	9	4	13	40	56	31	Second round	
2011	2. divisjon	↓ 14	26	3	2	21	43	106	11	First round	Relegated to the 3. divisjon
2012	3. divisjon	5	26	12	6	8	56	44	42	Second qualifying round	
2013	3. divisjon	7	26	11	4	11	70	66	37	First round	
2014	3. divisjon	4	26	14	5	7	72	40	47	First round	
2015	3. divisjon	3	26	19	1	6	108	35	58	Second qualifying round	
2016	3. divisjon	3	26	17	2	7	99	46	53	Second qualifying round	
2017	3. divisjon	3	26	12	4	10	65	61	40	First round	
2018	3. divisjon	8	26	10	4	12	48	46	34	Second round	
2019	3. divisjon	↓ 14	26	2	5	19	20	73	11	First round	Relegated to the 4. divisjon
2020	Season cancelled										
2021	4. divisjon	↑ 1	10	8	1	1	35	7	25	Did not qualify	Promoted to the 3. divisjon after play-offs
2022	3. divisjon	10	26	10	2	14	36	61	32	First qualifying round	
2023	3. divisjon	↓ 12	26	8	2	16	42	81	26	Second qualifying round	Relegated to the 4. divisjon
2024	4. divisjon	6	22	9	5	8	56	49	32	First qualifying round	
