= 1961–62 Norwegian Main League =

18th season of top-tier football league in Norway

Hovedserien
- Season: 1961–62
- Champions: Brann; 1st title
- Relegated: Rosenborg; Odd; Eik-Tønsberg; Sandefjord; Lisleby; Ørn-Horten; Greåker; Larvik Turn
- European Cup: Fredrikstad
- Matches played: 240
- Goals scored: 938 (3.91 per match)
- Average attendance: 4,734

The 1961–62 Hovedserien was the 18th completed season of top division football in Norway.

== Overview ==
It was contested by 16 teams, and Brann won the championship, their first league title.

== Teams and locations ==
Note: Table lists in alphabetical order.

Team	Ap.	Location
Brann	13	Bergen
Eik	5	Tønsberg
Fredrikstad	17	Fredrikstad
Frigg	7	Oslo
Greåker	4	Sarpsborg
Larvik Turn	13	Larvik
Lisleby	6	Fredrikstad
Lyn	10	Oslo
Odd	15	Skien
Ørn-Horten	8	Horten
Rosenborg	4	Trondheim
Sandefjord BK	16	Sandefjord
Skeid	16	Oslo
Steinkjer	5	Steinkjer
Vålerengen	13	Oslo
Viking	17	Stavanger

== League table ==
Pos	Team	Pld	W	D	L	GF	GA	GD	Pts	Qualification or relegation
1	Brann (C)	30	21	4	5	94	44	+50	46	
2	Steinkjer	30	18	5	7	81	43	+38	41	
3	Fredrikstad	30	18	5	7	80	45	+35	41	Qualification for the European Cup preliminary round
4	Frigg	30	15	10	5	59	43	+16	40	
5	Lyn	30	16	5	9	86	66	+20	37	
6	Vålerengen	30	15	6	9	75	41	+34	36	
7	Viking	30	14	7	9	49	48	+1	35	
8	Skeid	30	11	11	8	63	40	+23	33	
9	Rosenborg (R)	30	14	3	13	55	60	−5	31	Relegation to Second Division
10	Odd (R)	30	10	7	13	57	68	−11	27	Relegation to Second Division
11	Eik (R)	30	9	8	13	47	59	−12	26	Relegation to Second Division
12	Sandefjord BK (R)	30	11	3	16	35	51	−16	25	Relegation to Second Division
13	Lisleby (R)	30	8	3	19	42	74	−32	19	Relegation to Second Division
14	Ørn-Horten (R)	30	7	3	20	45	91	−46	17	Relegation to Second Division
15	Greåker (R)	30	4	8	18	35	75	−40	16	Relegation to Second Division
16	Larvik Turn (R)	30	3	4	23	35	90	−55	10	Relegation to Second Division

Source: NIFS
Rules for classification: 1) points; 2) goal difference; 3) number of goals scored.
(C) Champions; (R) Relegated

== Results ==
Home \ Away	SKB	EIK	FFK	FRI	GRE	LAR	LIS	LYN	ODD	ØRN	RBK	SBK	SKD	SFK	VIF	VIK
Brann		3–0	4–1	1–2	5–0	4–2	3–0	3–2	3–3	1–0	6–1	3–1	1–1	4–1	4–1	4–1
Eik	1–2		1–0	1–2	3–0	3–0	3–1	2–4	2–2	1–3	1–1	0–5	2–2	0–3	2–5	5–0
Fredrikstad	6–3	4–3		0–0	1–0	5–0	3–0	6–3	10–0	1–5	2–0	3–1	3–0	2–1	1–1	4–2
Frigg	4–0	2–1	0–0		1–1	3–2	2–2	2–5	5–1	4–2	2–1	2–1	1–0	1–1	2–1	3–0
Greåker	1–6	1–2	0–2	3–3		0–0	4–2	1–1	4–1	1–4	1–1	0–3	1–1	1–3	3–1	1–2
Larvik Turn	1–6	0–1	0–1	2–2	4–0		2–3	0–5	2–3	2–2	3–1	2–0	0–3	0–4	0–2	0–4
Lisleby	3–1	2–1	1–3	0–2	4–2	4–4		2–0	0–1	4–0	2–4	0–2	0–6	4–4	1–2	1–4
Lyn	2–5	1–2	2–1	3–1	5–1	4–1	3–0		5–3	4–3	3–2	3–1	6–0	3–6	1–6	2–2
Odd	3–5	1–1	1–1	1–2	2–2	3–0	0–1	2–1		7–2	5–2	1–0	2–2	1–2	3–1	0–1
Ørn	0–7	3–3	1–2	1–4	1–0	5–2	2–1	1–3	0–5		3–0	1–2	0–5	0–6	0–3	1–3
Rosenborg	1–4	3–0	4–2	3–2	4–2	4–3	0–2	1–3	2–1	2–0		1–0	3–1	1–0	2–0	3–1
Sandefjord BK	0–1	1–1	1–7	2–0	1–0	2–1	1–0	0–1	4–2	2–1	2–1		0–2	0–0	0–3	0–1
Skeid	1–1	0–2	1–1	1–1	4–0	7–0	4–0	2–2	1–2	1–1	2–3	4–1		0–1	3–3	2–2
Steinkjer	1–2	1–1	3–5	5–2	6–2	2–0	5–1	4–3	0–0	7–0	3–1	3–1	1–3		2–1	5–1
Vålerengen	2–2	6–1	4–1	1–1	0–1	5–2	3–0	3–3	5–0	3–2	3–3	7–1	0–2	0–1		3–0
Viking	2–0	1–1	3–2	1–1	2–2	2–0	3–1	3–3	2–1	2–0	1–0	0–0	0–2	3–0	0–1	

Source: NIFS.no
Legend: Blue = home team win; Yellow = draw; Red = away team win.

== Notes and references ==
- Norway - List of final tables (RSSSF)
