= 1967 in Norwegian football =

Football in Norway
- Season: 1967

Men's football
- 1. divisjon: Rosenborg
- 2. divisjon: Viking (Group A); Brann (Group B)
- NM: Lyn

The 1967 season was the 62nd season of competitive football in Norway.

== 1. divisjon ==
Pos	Team	Pld	W	D	L	GF	GA	GD	Pts	Qualification or relegation
1	Rosenborg (C)	18	9	7	2	40	24	+16	25	Qualification for the European Cup first round
2	Skeid	18	10	2	6	42	26	+16	22	Qualification for the Inter-Cities Fairs Cup first round
3	Lyn	18	9	3	6	39	30	+9	21	Qualification for the Cup Winners' Cup first round
4	Frigg	18	8	4	6	22	22	0	20	
5	Vålerengen	18	7	4	7	27	33	−6	18	
6	Fredrikstad	18	7	2	9	27	25	+2	16	
7	Sarpsborg FK	18	5	6	7	18	24	−6	16	
8	Strømsgodset	18	7	1	10	30	34	−4	15	
9	Steinkjer (R)	18	5	5	8	21	31	−10	15	Relegation to Second Division
10	Odd (R)	18	5	2	11	18	35	−17	12	Relegation to Second Division

Source: NIFS
Rules for classification: 1) points; 2) goal difference; 3) number of goals scored.
(C) Champions; (R) Relegated

== 2. divisjon ==
=== Group A ===
Pos	Team	Pld	W	D	L	GF	GA	GD	Pts	Promotion, qualification or relegation
1	Viking (C, P)	14	11	0	3	56	18	+38	22	Promotion to First Division
2	Start	14	9	2	3	39	24	+15	20	
3	Ørn-Horten	14	7	1	6	26	25	+1	15	
4	Bryne	14	5	4	5	31	31	0	14	
5	Eik	14	4	6	4	29	32	−3	14	
6	Vigør	14	4	4	6	25	27	−2	12	
7	Lisleby (R)	14	4	2	8	16	32	−16	10	Relegation to Third Division
8	Snøgg (R)	14	1	3	10	19	52	−33	5	Relegation to Third Division

Source: rsssf.no
Rules for classification: 1) points; 2) goal difference; 3) number of goals scored.
(C) Champions; (P) Promoted; (R) Relegated

=== Group B ===
Pos	Team	Pld	W	D	L	GF	GA	GD	Pts	Promotion, qualification or relegation
1	Brann (C, P)	14	9	2	3	39	18	+21	20	Promotion to First Division
2	Mjøndalen	14	8	1	5	25	20	+5	17	
3	Hødd	14	6	4	4	37	29	+8	16	
4	Aurskog	14	7	2	5	31	24	+7	16	
5	Gjøvik-Lyn	14	7	2	5	26	25	+1	16	
6	Raufoss	14	6	1	7	18	27	−9	13	
7	Nidelv (R)	14	2	4	8	14	33	−19	8	Relegation to Third Division
8	Kvik (R)	14	3	0	11	19	33	−14	6	Relegation to Third Division

Source: rsssf.no
Rules for classification: 1) points; 2) goal difference; 3) number of goals scored.
(C) Champions; (P) Promoted; (R) Relegated

== 3. divisjon ==
=== Group Østland/Søndre ===
Team	G	W	D	L	Goals	P	Notes
Pors	14	10	4	0	33-10	24	Promoted
Fram (Larvik)	14	8	3	3	26-17	19
Moss	14	6	4	4	19-19	16
Sandefjord	14	5	5	4	27-21	15
Østsiden	14	6	3	5	21-25	15
Larvik Turn	14	2	8	4	18-18	12	Relegated
Runar	14	1	4	9	17-29	6	Relegated
Heddal	14	2	1	11	12-34	5	Relegated

=== Group Øsland/Nordre ===
Team	G	W	D	L	Goals	P	Notes
Hamarkameratene	14	10	2	2	35-14	22	Promoted
Strømmen	14	8	4	2	34-12	20
Hamar IL	14	7	3	4	28-23	17
Sagene	14	6	3	5	27-23	15
Stabæk	14	6	2	6	21-19	14
Lillestrøm	14	3	4	7	19-29	10
Mesna	14	3	2	9	15-35	8
Moelven	14	2	2	10	10-44	6	Relegated

=== Group Sørland/Vestland, A ===
Team	G	W	D	L	Goals	P	Notes
Flekkefjord	14	11	1	2	44-15	23	Play-off
Sørfjell	14	8	3	3	26-17	19
Jerv	14	7	2	5	43-32	16
Grane Arendal	14	6	3	5	33-26	15
Donn	14	6	2	6	22-27	14
Vindbjart	14	5	3	6	22-23	13
Rygene	14	3	2	9	25-40	8	Relegated
Øyestad	14	2	0	12	9-44	4	Relegated

=== Group Sørland/Vestland, B ===
Team	G	W	D	L	Goals	P	Notes
Vard	14	11	0	3	43-24	22	Play-off
Odda	14	9	1	4	32-28	19
Ulf	14	8	1	5	37-22	17
Buøy	14	7	1	6	30-27	15
Jarl	14	7	1	6	19-22	15
Haugar	14	5	2	7	26-28	12
Vidar	14	3	2	9	14-29	8
Ålgård	14	2	0	12	19-40	4	Relegated

=== Group Sørland/Vestland, C ===
Team	G	W	D	L	Goals	P	Notes
Varegg	14	10	2	2	39-17	22	Play-off
Sogndal	14	7	3	4	31-18	17
Baune	14	8	1	5	26-20	17
Os	14	8	1	5	19-15	17
Årstad	14	6	1	7	22-23	13
Ny-Krohnborg	14	3	4	7	15-33	10
Nymark	14	3	2	9	16-28	8	Relegated
Florvåg	14	2	4	8	25-39	8	Relegated

=== Group Møre ===
Team	G	W	D	L	Goals	P	Notes
Aalesund	14	12	2	0	49-11	26	Play-off
Molde	14	9	1	4	40-16	19
Herd	14	7	3	4	24-14	7
Langevåg	14	7	2	5	30-28	16
Clausenengen	14	5	0	9	19-29	10
Velledalen/Ringen	14	4	1	9	17-36	9
Kristiansund	14	2	4	8	13-39	8
Spjelkavik	14	2	3	9	12-31	7	Relegated

=== Group Trøndelag ===
Team	G	W	D	L	Goals	P	Notes
Falken	14	9	2	3	35-20	20	Play-off
Sverre	14	8	2	4	35-29	18
Brekstad	14	8	0	6	30-22	16
Namsos	14	7	2	5	29-28	16
Løkken	14	6	2	6	29-26	14	Relegated
Verdal	14	4	4	6	24-23	12	Relegated
Nessegutten	14	4	1	9	19-34	9	Relegated
Freidig	14	2	3	9	16-35	7	Relegated

=== District IX-X ===
Team	G	W	D	L	Goals	P	Notes
Mjølner	10	6	2	2	18-9	14
Mo	10	4	4	2	13-9	12
Bodø/Glimt	10	4	2	4	21-14	10
Harstad	10	4	1	5	11-12	9
Stålkameratene	10	2	5	3	6-10	9
Narvik/Nor	10	2	2	6	7-22	6	Relegated

=== District XI ===
Team	G	W	D	L	Goals	P	Notes
Alta	10	6	2	2	28-12	14
Kirkenes	10	7	0	3	29-15	14
Stein	10	6	2	2	27-14	14
Honningsvåg	10	3	3	4	17-21	9
Norild	10	3	3	4	17-21	9
Kvalsund	10	0	0	10	7-51	9	Relegated

=== Play-off Sørland/Vestland ===
- Varegg - Vard 1–4
- Flekkefjord - Varegg 1–2
- Vard - Flekkefjord 7–2

Team	G	W	D	L	Goals	P	Notes
Vard	2	2	0	0	11-3	4	Promoted
Varegg	2	1	0	1	3-5	2
Flekkefjord	2	0	0	2	3-9	0

=== Play-off Møre/Trøndelag ===
- Aalesund - Falken 1–1
- Falken - Aalesund 0-1 (agg. 1–2)

Aalesund promoted

=== Northern Norway Championship ===
- Mjølner - Alta 11–0

== 4. divisjon ==
=== District I ===
Team	Notes
Sparta	Play-off
Ørje
Navestad
Borgen
Askim
Kvik Halden
Selbak
Mysen
Greåker
Torp

=== District II, Group A ===
Team	Notes
Drafn	Play-off
Eidsvold Turn
Asker
Kongsberg
Spartacus
Svelvik
Vito
Lunner

=== District II, Group B ===
Team	Notes
Åssiden	Play-off
Kampørn
Grue
Kongsvinger
Slemmestad
Skiold
Liull
Flisa

=== District III, Group A (Oplandene) ===
Team	Notes
Brumunddal	Play-off
Vardal
Redalen
Fremad
Lena
Kapp
Stange
Ottestad

=== District III, Group B1 (Sør-Østerdal) ===
Team	Notes
Nordre Trysil	Play-off
Nybergsund
Østby
Koppang
Elverum
Trysilgutten
Ytre Rendal
Engerdal

=== District III, Group B2 (Nord-Østerdal) ===
Team	Notes
Brekken	Play-off
Røros
Tynset
Ålen
Haltdalen
Folldal
Nansen
Os

=== District III, Group B3 (Sør-Gudbrandsdal) ===
Team	Notes
Faaberg	Play-off
Kvam
Follebu
Fåvang
Vinstra

=== District III, Group B4 (Nord-Gudbrandsdal) ===
Team	Notes
Sel	Play-off
Vågå
Dovre
Faukstad
Otta
Dombås

=== District IV, Group A (Vestfold) ===
Team	Notes
Stag	Play-off
Nanset
Tønsbergkameratene
Tønsberg Turn
Halsen
Sandar
Teie
Holmestrand
Store Bergan
Falk

=== District IV, Group B (Telemark) ===
Team	Notes
Brevik	Play-off
Herkules
Gvarv
Urædd
Borg
Kragerø
Gjerpen
Ulefoss
Drangedal
Kjapp

=== District V, Group A1 (Aust-Agder) ===
Team	Notes
Risør	Promoted
Tvedestrand
Arendals BK
Lillesand
Trauma
Lia
Froland
Dristug

=== District V, Group A2 (Vest-Agder) ===
Team	Notes
Mandalskameratene	Promoted
Kvinesdal
Farsund
Våg
Giv Akt
Lyngdal
Torridal

=== District V, Group B1 (Rogaland) ===
Team	Notes
Stavanger IF	Play-off
Kopervik
Randaberg
Djerv 1919
Sandnes AIF
Brodd
Sola
Nord

=== District V, Group B2 (Rogaland) ===
Team	Notes
Klepp	Play-off
Nærbø
Vigrestad
Pol
Varhaug
Egersund
Engøy
Oltedal

=== District V, Group B3 (Sunnhordland) ===
Team	Notes
Stord	Play-off

- Table unknown

=== District VI, Group A (Bergen) ===
Team	Notes
Sandviken	Play-off
Nordnes
Fjellkameratene
BSI
Djerv
Hardy
Laksevåg
Orion

=== District VI, Group B (Midthordland) ===
Team	Notes
Arna	Play-off
Fana
Radøy
Dale
Erdal
Voss
Follese
Ramsøy	Disqualified

=== District VI, Group C (Sogn og fjordane) ===
Team	Notes
Jotun	Play-off
Tornado
Høyang
Eid
Stryn
Måløy
Førde
Sandane

=== District VII, Group A (Sunnmøre) ===
Team	Notes
Skarbøvik	Play-off
Ørsta
Sykkylven
Bergsøy
Rollon
Stranda
Blindheim
Valder

=== District VII, Group B (Romsdal) ===
Team	Notes
Åndalsnes	Play-off
Gossen
Eidsvåg
Træff
Bryn
Isfjorden
Fiksdal
Harøy

=== District VII, Group C (Nordmøre) ===
Team	Notes
Bøfjord	Play-off
Søya
Todalen
Surnadal
Sunndal
Braatt
Tingvoll
Grykameratene

=== District VIII, Group A (Sør-Trøndelag) ===
Team	Notes
Flå	Play-off
Rindal
Orkdal
Melhus
Orkanger
Glimt Gjølme
Svorkmo
Vårglimt

=== District VIII, Group B (Trondheim) ===
Team	Notes
Strinda	Play-off
Sverresborg
Brage
Heimdal
Ranheim
Astor
Hommelvik
Selsbakk	Withdrew

=== District VIII, Group C (Fosen) ===
Team	Notes
Hasselvika	Play-off
Stadsbygd
Bjugn
Leksvik
Opphaug
Rissa
Nes IL
Fevåg

=== District VIII, Group D (Nord-Trøndelag/Namdal) ===
Team	Notes
Neset	Play-off
Stjørdals/Blink
Beitstad
Fram Skatval
Bangsund
Sprova
Henning
Meråkeralliansen

=== Play-off District I/IV ===
- Sparta - Stag 1–3
- Stag - Brevik 4–2
- Brevik - Sparta 2–0

Team	G	W	D	L	Goals	P	Notes
Stag	2	2	0	0	7-3	4	Promoted
Brevik	2	1	0	1	4-4	2	Promoted
Sparta	2	0	0	2	1-5	0

=== Play-off District II/III ===
- Nordre Trysil - Brekken 1–0
- Sel - Faaberg 3–7
- Faaberg - Nordre Trysil 0–3
- Brumunddal - Drafn 0–3
- Åssiden - Nordre Trysil 3–1
- Drafn - Åssiden 2–0
- Nordre Trysil - Brumunddal 1–1
- Brumunddal - Åssiden 1–1
- Drafn - Nordre Trysil 2–1

Team	G	W	D	L	Goals	P	Notes
Drafn	3	3	0	0	7-1	6	Promoted
Åssiden	3	1	1	1	4-4	3	Promoted
Brumunddal	3	0	2	1	2-5	2
Nordre Trysil	3	0	1	2	3-6	1

=== Championship District III ===
- Brumunddal - Nordre Trysil 6–1

=== Play-off District V ===
- Klepp - Stavanger 1–2
- Stord - Klepp 2–4
- Stavanger - Stord 2–2

Team	G	W	D	L	Goals	P	Notes
Stavanger IF	2	1	1	0	4-3	3	Promoted
Klepp	2	1	0	1	5-4	2	Promoted
Stord	2	0	1	1	4-6	1

=== Championship District V ===
- Risør - Mandalskameratene 3–3
- Mandalskameratene - Risør 3–1

=== Play-off District VI ===
- Jotun - Arna 2–0
- Arna - Sandviken 0–1
- Sandviken - Jotun 4–0

Team	G	W	D	L	Goals	P	Notes
Sandviken	2	2	0	0	5-0	4	Promoted
Jotun	2	1	0	1	2-4	2	Promoted
Arna	2	0	0	2	0-3	0

=== Play-off District VII ===
- Skarbøvik - Åndalsnes 1–6
- Åndalsnes - Bøfjord 3–1
- Bøfjord - Skarbøvik 0–3

Team	G	W	D	L	Goals	P	Notes
Åndalsnes	2	2	0	0	9-2	4	Promoted
Skarbøvik	2	1	0	1	4-6	2	Promoted
Bøfjord	2	0	0	2	1-6	0

=== Play-off District VIII ===
- Neset - Strinda 1–1
- Flå - Hasselvika 2–2
- Strinda - Flå 0–1
- Hasselvika - Neset 2–1
- Strinda - Hasselvika 2–3
- Flå - Neset 0–3

Team	G	W	D	L	Goals	P	Notes
Hasselvika	3	2	1	0	7-5	5	Promoted
Neset	3	1	1	1	5-3	3	Promoted
Flå	3	1	1	1	3-5	3
Strinda	3	0	1	2	3-5	1

== Norwegian Cup ==
=== Final ===
29 October 1967
13:15 CET (UTC+1)

Lyn	4–1	Rosenborg
Dybwad-Olsen 10' (pen.); H. Berg 25', 42'; K. Berg 52' (pen.)	Report	Iversen 34'

Ullevaal Stadion, Oslo
Attendance: 27,389
Referee: Ivar Hornslien (Nydalen)

== Northern Norwegian Cup ==
=== Final ===
Bodø/Glimt	2–1	Mo
	Report

== European Cups 1967/68 ==
=== Norwegian representatives ===
- Skeid (UEFA Champions League)
- Fredrikstad (Cup Winners Cup)
- Lyn (Fairs Cup)

=== European Cup ===
==== First round ====
September 20:

- Skeid - Sparta Prague (Czechoslovakia) 0–1

October 4

- Sparta Prague - Skeid 1-1 (agg. 2–1)

=== European Cup Winners' Cup ===
==== First round ====
September 20

- Fredrikstad - Setubal (Portugal) 1–5

October 5

- Setubal - Fredrikstad 2-1 (agg. 7–2)

=== Fairs Cup ===
==== First round ====
September 19

- Bologna (Italy) - Lyn 2–0

October 4

- Lyn - Bologna 0-0 (agg. 0–2)

== National team ==
Date	Venue	Opponent	Res.*	Competition	Norwegian goalscorers
June 1	Helsinki	Finland	2–0	Friendly	Nils Olav Nilsen (2)
June 8	Oslo	Portugal	1–2	ECQ	Odd Iversen
June 29	Oslo	Bulgaria	0–0	ECQ
September 3	Oslo	Sweden	3–1	ECQ	Harald Johan Berg, Harald Sunde, Sven Otto Birkeland
September 24	Oslo	Denmark	0–5	Friendly
November 5	Stockholm	Sweden	2–5	ECQ	Odd Iversen, Nils Olav Nilsen
November 12	Porto	Portugal	1–2	ECQ	Nils Olav Nilsen

Note: Norway's goals first
Explanation:

- ECQ = UEFA Euro 1968 qualifier
