= Jan Christiansen =

Norwegian footballer and coach (born 1941)

Personal information
- Full name: Jan Clifford Christiansen
- Date of birth: 8 April 1941 (age 85)
- Position: Midfielder

Senior career*
Years	Team	Apps	(Gls)
1962–1963	Lillestrøm		
1966–1975	Rosenborg	169	(25)
1976	Røros		

International career
1969–1973	Norway	13	(0)

Managerial career
- 1975: Rosenborg
- 1976: Røros
- * Club domestic league appearances and goals

Jan Clifford Christiansen (born 8 April 1941) is a Norwegian former football player and coach. He played for Rosenborg BK in Trondheim from 1966 to 1975, earning three league titles and one cup championship. Christiansen was capped 13 times for Norway national football team. Christiansen coached Rosenborg BK in the 1975 season.

== Biography ==
Jan Christiansen came to Trondheim in 1965 as student at the Norwegian Institute of Technology. Prior to this, he had played football for his hometown team Enebakk IF and in the second division for Lillestrøm. From 1966, Christiansen played regularly as midfielder for Rosenborg. In the seasons 1967–1975 while Rosenborg played in the Norwegian top division, Christiansen played 160 matches and scored 25 goals. Christiansen was captain of both Rosenborg BK and the Norwegian national team.

Christiansen was playing coach of Rosenborg BK in the 1975 season, and in the 1976 season he was playing coach of Røros IL. Christiansen is now retired, and lives in Enebakk.

== Honours ==
Rosenborg BK

- Norwegian Premier League champion: 1967, 1969, 1971,
- Norwegian Premier League runner-up: 1968, 1970, 1973
- Norwegian Cup champion: 1971
- Norwegian Cup runner-up: 1967, 1972, 1973
