= Rosenborg BK league record by opponent =

Association football club in Trondheim, Norway

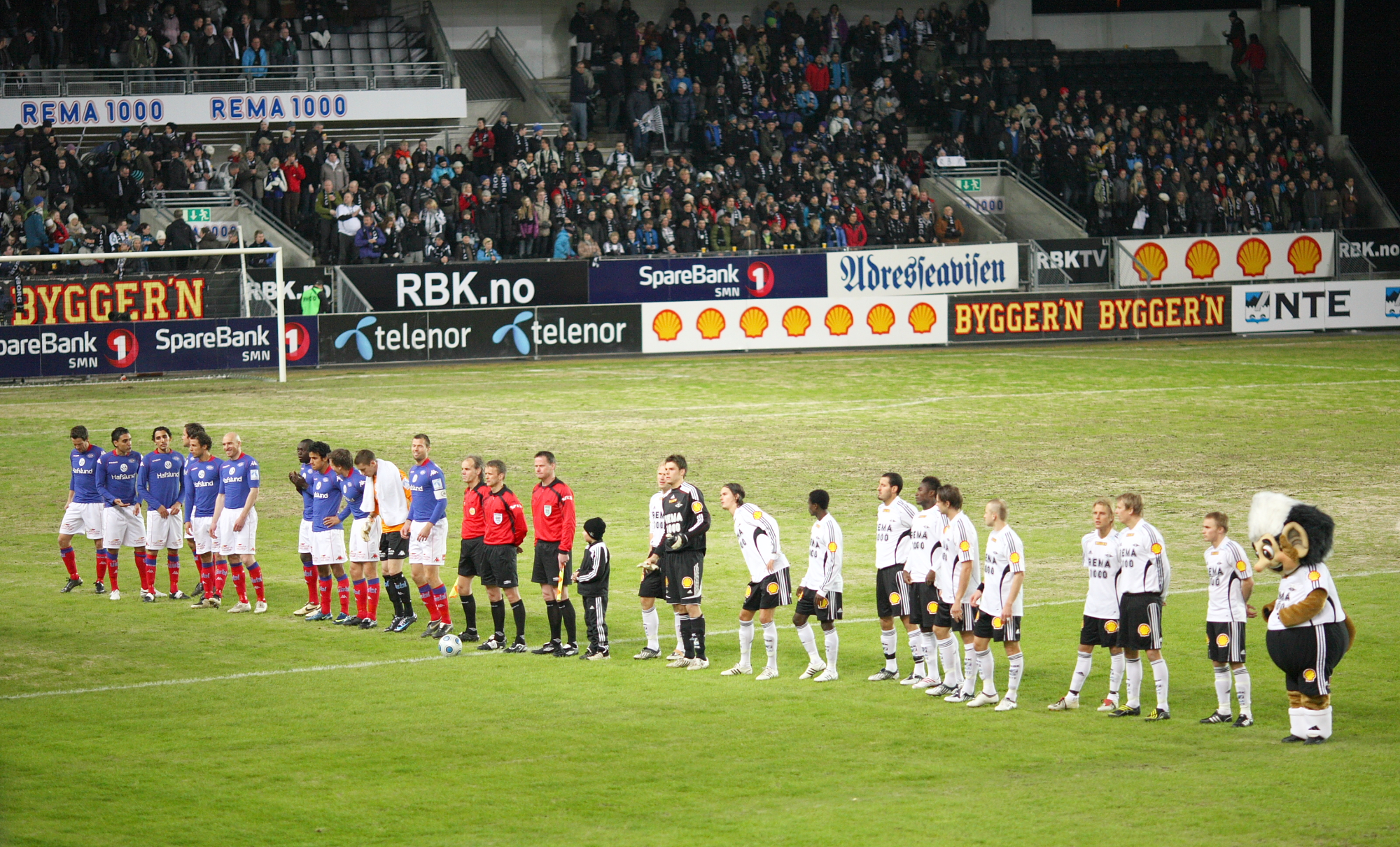
Pre-match lineup at a home league game against Vålerenga (in blue) on 15 March 2009

Rosenborg Ballklub is an association football club based in Trondheim, Norway. The most successful club in Norway, Rosenborg has won the Norwegian Premier League 22 times and the Norwegian Football Cup 9 times. Although founded in 1917, it was not permitted to play in matches sanctioned by the Football Association of Norway until 1928. Rosenborg joined the top league in 1967 and won it in the club's inaugural top tier season. It has only spent one season outside the top tier since, which was in 1978.

Viking is the club with which Rosenborg has played the most, in 41 seasons. It is also the club which Rosenborg has drawn and lost against the most—28 and 26 times, respectively. With 40 seasons, Brann has played the second-most times and is the club Rosenborg has beat the most times. Rosenborg's main rivalries are against Brann and Molde. Strindheim is the only other team from Trondheim that Rosenborg has played against in the top league. The two groundshared Lerkendal Stadium in Strindheim's top-league 1984 and 1995 seasons.

SK Haugar, which only played in the same division as Rosenborg in 1981, is the only team which has beaten Rosenborg more times than Rosenborg has beaten it. Haugar and Vard are the only teams against which Rosenborg holds a negative goal difference. Along with Nessegutten, Haugar is the only team Rosenborg has never beaten. Conversely, Rosenborg has won every league match against Djerv 1919, Os, Pors and Stjørdals-Blink; Rosenborg holds a clean sheet against the latter three. Nessegutten and Stjørdals-Blink are the only teams Rosenborg has exclusively played while in the Second Division.

== League record since 1967 ==
The following is a record of results against all clubs Rosenborg BK has played in the domestic league from the 1967 season and onwards. For all seasons except 1978, this represented the teams in the Norwegian First Division and from 1991 the Norwegian Premier League, while for 1978 this represents the Second Division. The table includes games played (P), games won (W), games drawn (D), games lost (L), goals for (GF), goals against (GA) and the winning percentage (Win%), in addition to the first and last years the two clubs met in the league. The statistics are complete as of the end of the 2012 season.

Rosenborg BK league record by opponent
Club	P	W	D	L	P	W	D	L	P	W	D	L	GF	GA	Win%	First	Last
Club	Home				Away				Total						Win%	First	Last
Aalesund	8	4	4	0	8	5	2	1	16	9	6	1	33	18	56.3	2003	2012
Bodø/Glimt	18	14	2	2	18	14	3	1	36	28	5	3	95	37	77.8	1977	2009
Brann	40	23	11	6	40	16	13	11	80	39	24	17	177	92	48.8	1968	2012
Bryne	16	10	2	4	16	7	3	6	32	17	5	10	76	55	53.1	1976	2003
Djerv 1919	1	1	0	0	1	1	0	0	2	2	0	0	14	1	100.0	1988	1988
Eik-Tønsberg	3	2	0	1	3	1	1	1	6	3	1	2	16	12	50.0	1983	1985
Fredrikstad	21	13	4	4	21	8	7	6	42	21	11	10	73	52	50.0	1967	2012
Frigg	5	3	2	0	5	1	3	1	10	4	5	1	12	6	40.0	1967	1978
Fyllingen	3	3	0	0	3	2	1	0	6	5	1	0	17	3	83.3	1990	1993
HamKam	22	15	4	3	22	6	6	10	44	21	10	13	90	52	47.7	1970	2008
Haugar	1	0	0	1	1	0	1	0	2	0	1	1	1	3	0.0	1981	1981
Haugesund	6	5	0	1	6	4	2	0	12	9	2	1	34	12	75.0	1997	2012
Hødd	6	5	0	1	6	4	2	0	12	9	2	1	30	10	75.0	1969	1995
Hønefoss	2	1	0	1	2	2	0	0	4	3	0	1	9	2	75.0	2010	2012
Kongsvinger	19	14	4	1	19	5	6	8	38	19	10	9	86	44	50.0	1978	2010
Lillestrøm	37	20	13	4	37	13	9	15	74	33	22	19	135	93	44.6	1975	2012
Lyn	21	15	4	2	21	11	6	4	42	26	10	6	91	44	61.9	1967	2009
Mjølner	2	2	0	0	2	1	1	0	4	3	1	0	12	4	75.0	1972	1989
Mjøndalen	13	6	2	5	13	4	5	4	26	10	7	9	39	29	38.5	1972	1992
Molde	33	20	5	8	33	18	5	10	66	38	10	18	120	71	57.6	1974	2012
Moss	18	11	2	5	18	6	10	2	36	17	12	7	76	43	47.2	1977	2002
Nessegutten	1	0	1	0	1	0	1	0	2	0	2	0	2	2	0.0	1978	1978
Odd Grenland	14	9	3	2	14	9	4	1	28	18	7	3	68	24	64.3	1967	2012
Os	1	1	0	0	1	1	0	0	2	2	0	0	5	3	100.0	1975	1975
Pors	1	1	0	0	1	1	0	0	2	2	0	0	3	0	100.0	1970	1970
Raufoss	3	1	2	0	3	2	1	0	6	3	3	0	10	4	50.0	1973	1978
Sandefjord	4	4	0	0	4	3	1	0	8	7	1	0	19	5	87.5	2006	2010
Sandnes Ulf	1	1	0	0	1	0	1	0	2	1	1	0	3	1	50.0	2006	2010
Sarpsborg	7	3	2	2	7	4	2	1	14	7	4	3	25	10	50.0	1967	1974
Sarpsborg 08	1	1	0	0	1	1	0	0	2	2	0	0	10	0	100.0	2011	2011
Skeid	13	13	0	0	13	7	3	3	26	20	3	3	71	19	76.9	1967	1999
Sogndal	14	13	1	0	14	6	6	2	28	19	7	2	81	30	67.9	1982	2012
Stabæk	17	11	1	5	17	5	5	7	34	16	6	12	59	46	47.1	1996	2012
Start	31	19	7	5	31	12	7	12	62	31	14	17	127	82	50.0	1969	2011
Steinkjer	1	1	0	0	1	0	1	0	2	1	1	0	3	2	50.0	1967	1967
Stjørdals-Blink	1	1	0	0	1	1	0	0	2	2	0	0	13	0	100.0	1978	1978
Strindheim	3	3	0	0	3	2	1	0	6	5	1	0	17	2	83.3	1978	1995
Strømmen	3	2	1	0	3	2	1	0	6	4	2	0	15	2	66.7	1978	1988
Strømsgodset	24	17	5	2	24	11	3	10	48	28	8	12	114	56	58.3	1967	2012
Tromsø	26	15	8	3	26	9	8	9	52	24	16	12	90	63	46.2	1986	2012
Vard	1	1	0	0	1	0	0	1	2	1	0	1	2	4	50.0	1976	1976
Viking	42	18	14	10	42	12	15	15	84	30	29	25	116	111	35.7	1968	2012
Vålerenga	34	21	4	9	34	12	12	10	68	33	16	19	139	91	48.5	1967	2012
