= Kåre Rønnes =

Norwegian footballer and manager (born 1938)

Personal information
- Full name: Kåre Rønnes
- Date of birth: 13 January 1938 (age 88)
- Place of birth: Trondheim, Norway
- Positions: Defender; midfielder

Youth career
- Rosenborg

Senior career*
Years	Team	Apps	(Gls)
1956–1974	Rosenborg	275	(30)

International career
1960	Norway U-21	1	(1)
1961	Norway B	1	(0)

Managerial career
- 1975: Rosenborg
- 1976–1977: Strindheim
- * Club domestic league appearances and goals

Kåre Rønnes (born 13 January 1938) is a Norwegian former football player and coach. He played all his career in Rosenborg BK, Trondheim.

== Biography ==
Kåre Rønnes played for his hometown team Rosenborg 19 consecutive seasons (1956 to 1974), a record shared with Ola By Rise. Roar Strand has played 19 successive seasons for the club. Rønnes played in all positions on the field, including goalkeeper, but mostly midfielder in the first part of his career, and defender in the later part. As young as 22 he became captain of the team.

No accurate statistics exist on the number of matches Rønnes played, but it is estimated to 700. Totally in the seasons 1961–1962 and 1967–1974 while Rosenborg played in the Norwegian top division, Rønnes played 178 matches and scored 17 goals.

Rønnes was capped once for Norway U-21 national team.

Rønnes was manager of Rosenborg BK in the 1975 season, coaching the team to fourth position, equal in points with runner-up Brann and Start in the third position. Rønnes continued his managerial career in Strindheim IL in the 1976 and 1977 seasons, coaching Strindheim from the third to the second level in Norwegian football.

== Honours ==
=== Club ===
Rosenborg BK

- Norwegian Premier League Champion: 1967, 1969, 1971,
- Norwegian Premier League Runner up: 1968, 1970, 1973
- Norwegian Cup Win: 1960, 1964, 1971
- Norwegian Cup Runner up: 1967, 1972, 1973

=== Individual ===
Rønnes is appointed honorary member of Rosenborg BK.
