= Tore Nordtvedt =

Norwegian footballer (born 1944)

Personal information
- Full name: Tore Nordtvedt
- Date of birth: 24 May 1944 (age 82)
- Place of birth: Bergen, Norway
- Positions: Left full back; left wing back

Youth career
- SK Brann

Senior career*
| Years | Team | Apps | (Gls) |
| 1963–1979 | SK Brann | 305 | (1) |
- * Club domestic league appearances and goals

Tore Nordtvedt (born 24 May 1944) is a retired Norwegian football player. Nordtvedt played his entire 16-year career at SK Brann.

He debuted against Lyn Oslo in the championship season of 1963 when he was 18 years old. He played at the club from 1963 to 1979. Nordtvedt played a total of 557 games for Brann, which is a club record.

== Career statistics ==
| Season | Club | Division | League | | National Cup | | League Cup | | Europe | | Total | |
| Season | Club | Division | Apps | Goals | Apps | Goals | Apps | Goals | Apps | Goals | Apps | Goals |
|---|---|---|---|---|---|---|---|---|---|---|---|---|
| 1963 | Brann | 1. divisjon | 12 | 0 | 4 | 0 | — | | — | | 16 | 0 |
| 1964 | Brann | 1. divisjon | 18 | 0 | 5 | 0 | — | | — | | 23 | 0 |
| 1965 | Brann | 2. divisjon | 14 | 0 | 5 | 0 | — | | — | | 19 | 0 |
| 1966 | Brann | 2. divisjon | 14 | 0 | 4 | 0 | — | | — | | 18 | 0 |
| 1967 | Brann | 2. divisjon | 14 | 0 | 6 | 0 | — | | — | | 20 | 0 |
| 1968 | Brann | 1. divisjon | 18 | 0 | 6 | 0 | — | | — | | 24 | 0 |
| 1969 | Brann | 1. divisjon | 17 | 0 | 4 | 0 | — | | — | | 21 | 0 |
| 1970 | Brann | 1. divisjon | 18 | 0 | 7 | 0 | — | | — | | 25 | 0 |
| 1971 | Brann | 1. divisjon | 17 | 0 | 3 | 0 | — | | — | | 20 | 0 |
| 1972 | Brann | 1. divisjon | 22 | 0 | 7 | 0 | — | | — | | 29 | 0 |
| 1973 | Brann | 1. divisjon | 20 | 0 | 4 | 0 | — | | 4 | 0 | 28 | 0 |
| 1974 | Brann | 1. divisjon | 21 | 0 | 5 | 0 | — | | — | | 26 | 0 |
| 1975 | Brann | 1. divisjon | 21 | 1 | 4 | 0 | — | | — | | 25 | 1 |
| 1976 | Brann | 1. divisjon | 22 | 0 | 7 | 0 | — | | 2 | 0 | 31 | 0 |
| 1977 | Brann | 1. divisjon | 20 | 0 | 4 | 0 | — | | 4 | 0 | 28 | 0 |
| 1978 | Brann | 1. divisjon | 21 | 0 | 6 | 0 | — | | — | | 27 | 0 |
| 1979 | Brann | 1. divisjon | 16 | 0 | 2 | 0 | — | | — | | 18 | 0 |
| Career total | | | 305 | 1 | 83 | 0 | 0 | 0 | 10 | 0 | 398 | 1 |

== Honours ==
Brann

- 1. divisjon: 1963
- Norwegian Cup: 1972, 1976
