= Harald Sunde (footballer) =

Norwegian footballer and manager (born 1944)

Personal information
- Date of birth: 21 February 1944 (age 82)
- Place of birth: Trondheim, Norway
- Positions: Striker; midfielder

Youth career
- Nidelv

Senior career*
Years	Team	Apps	(Gls)
–1965	Nidelv		
1966–1970	Rosenborg	54	(21)
1970–1972	Racing Mechelen		
1972–1974	Rosenborg	45	(8)
1975–1977	Orkanger		
1978	Rosenborg		
1979	Rosenborg	5	(1)

International career
1963–1964	Norway U21	4	(2)
1964–1973	Norway	39	(5)

Managerial career
- 1975–1977: Orkanger
- 1983: Rosenborg
- * Club domestic league appearances and goals

Harald Sunde (born 21 February 1944) is a Norwegian former football player and coach. He played for Rosenborg BK in Trondheim in three periods from 1967 to 1979, in seven seasons in the Norwegian Premier League he played 104 matches and scored 30 goals. Sunde was capped 39 times for Norway national football team and scored five goals. Sunde coached Rosenborg BK in parts of the 1983 season.

== Career ==
Harald Sunde started his football career in Nidelv IL in Trondheim, which in the early sixties was one of the best clubs in the city. Sunde was capped for Norway junior team in 1961 and for Norway u-21 in 1963 and the Norway national football team in 1964. When Rosenborg BK in 1967 was promoted to the top division Sunde transferred to Rosenborg BK. In Rosenborg Sunde was striker together with Odd Iversen, the 1967 season was successful with league gold medals. 1968 Rosenborg came second, and earned gold medals again in 1969.

In 1970 Sunde and Iversen were both sold to Racing Mechelen in Belgium. Sunde returned to Rosenborg in 1972.

In 1975 Sunde became playing coach for Orkanger IF, and he returned to Rosenborg in 1978 when Rosenborg was in the second division. Nils Arne Eggen had taken over the role as head coach and Rosenborg managed to return to the top division after one season in the second division. In his last season 1979 Sunde played five league matches. In the eighties Sunde had different coaching roles in Rosenborg, amongst these a period as head coach in 1983.

== Honours ==
Rosenborg BK

- Norwegian Premier League champion: 1967, 1969
- Norwegian Premier League runner-up: 1968, 1973
- Norwegian Cup runner-up 1967, 1973

== Personal life ==
He is a grandfather of Jesper Reitan-Sunde.
