= Eliteserien records and statistics =

The top tier of Norwegian football has existed as a one-league top flight since 1963. The league was renamed Eliteserien for the start of the 2017 season. The following page details the football records and statistics of the Norwegian top flight since 1963.

== League records ==
=== Titles ===
- Most titles: 26, Rosenborg
- Most consecutive title wins: 13, Rosenborg (1992 – 2004)
- Biggest title-winning margin: 19 points, 2020; Bodø/Glimt (81 points) over Molde (62 points)
- Smallest title-winning margin: 0 points and 0 goal difference (+18) – 2004; Rosenborg (52 scored goals) over Vålerenga (40 scored goals). Both finished on 48 points and +18 in goal difference, but Rosenborg won the title with a superior number of goals scored – the only time that the number of goals scored has determined Eliteserien.

=== Wins ===
- Most wins in a season (30 games): 26, Bodø/Glimt (2020)
- Most wins in a season (26 games): 20, Rosenborg (1998)
- Most wins in a season (22 games): 16, joint record:
  - Viking (1972)
  - Lillestrøm (1977, 1986, 1989)
- Most wins in a season (18 games): 14, Lyn (1968)
- Fewest wins in a season (26/30 games): 2, joint record:
  - Start (2002, 2016)
  - Lyn (2009)
  - Sandefjord (2010)
  - Aalesund (2020)
- Fewest home wins in a season (9/11 games): 0, joint record:
  - Sandefjord (1965)
  - Os (1975)
  - Steinkjer (1978)
- Most home wins in a season (15 games): 15,
  - Bodø/Glimt (2020)
- Fewest home wins in a season (15 games): 1, joint record:
  - Lyn (2009)
  - Sandefjord (2022)
- Most away wins in a season (15 games): 13,
  - Molde (2022)
- Fewest away wins in a season: 0, joint record:
  - Brann (1964, 1979, 1992)
  - Sandefjord (1965)
  - Strømsgodset (1967, 1994)
  - Frigg (1968)
  - Mjølner (1972)
  - Raufoss (1974)
  - Os (1975)
  - Vard (1976)
  - Rosenborg (1977)
  - Lyn (1981, 1997)
  - Mjøndalen (1982, 1988, 2015)
  - Eik-Tønsberg (1985)
  - Moss (1988)
  - Strømmen (1990)
  - Viking (1992)
  - Sogndal (1992, 2004)
  - Fyllingen (1993)
  - Bryne (2000, 2003)
  - Sandefjord (2007, 2010, 2015)
  - Sarpsborg 08 (2011)
  - Tromsø (2013)
  - Sandnes Ulf (2014)
  - Start (2016)
- Most consecutive wins: 17,
  - Molde (2022–)
- Most consecutive games without a win: 39, Start (12 July 2015 – 18 September 2016)

=== Defeats ===
- Fewest defeats in a season (30 games): 0, Rosenborg (2010)
- Longest unbeaten run: 33 games, Rosenborg (18 October 2009 – 7 November 2010)
- Most defeats in total: 423, Brann
- Fewest home defeats in a season (15 games): 0, joint record:
  - Rosenborg (2010, 2015)
  - Vålerenga (2010)
  - Strømsgodset (2012, 2013)
  - Molde (2019)
  - Odd (2019)
  - Bodø/Glimt (2020)
- Fewest away defeats in a season (15 games): 0, joint record:
  - Rosenborg (2009, 2010)
  - Molde (2022)
- Most consecutive defeats: 11, Vålerenga (6 August 1989 – 6 May 1990)
- Most consecutive defeats in a season: 10, joint record:
  - Os (1975)
  - Strømsgodset (1994)
  - Bryne (2003)
- Most consecutive games unbeaten from beginning of season: 30, Rosenborg
- Most consecutive home games unbeaten: 46, Strømsgodset (26 June 2011 – 6 July 2014)
- Most consecutive away games unbeaten: 30, Rosenborg (23 March 2009 – 31 October 2010)

=== Draws ===
- Most draws in a season (30 games): 15, Sarpsborg 08 (2019)
- Most draws in a season (22/26 games): 12 – joint record:
  - Haugar (1981)
  - Brann (1992)
  - Vålerenga (2002)
  - Viking (2004)
- Most draws in a season (18 games): 9, Lyn (1966)
- Most home draws in a season: 9, Sarpsborg 08 (2019)
- Most away draws in a season: 8, Bodø/Glimt (2018)
- Fewest home draws in a season (30 games): 0 – joint record:
  - Molde (2012)
  - Rosenborg (2010, 2016)
  - Bodø/Glimt (2020)
- Fewest away draws in a season (30 games): 0 – joint record:
  - Bodø/Glimt (2014, 2022)
  - Viking (2015)
  - Sandefjord (2022)
- Most consecutive draws:
- Most draws in total: 354, Viking

=== Attendances ===
- Highest attendance, single game: 28,569, Rosenborg 1–0 Lillestrøm (at Lerkendal Stadion, 12 October 1985)
- Lowest attendance, single game: 202, Strømmen 1–2 Mjøndalen (at Strømmen Stadion, 19 October 1986)
- Highest average attendance, season: 19,903, Rosenborg (2007)
- Lowest average attendance, season: 1,448, Strømmen (1986)

These figures do not take into account the 2020 and 2021 seasons, when many matches had an attendance of zero due to public health measures adopted to control the COVID-19 pandemic.

=== Goals ===
- Most goals scored in a season: 103, Bodø/Glimt (2020)
- Fewest goals scored in a season (30 games): 23, joint record:
  - Start (2016)
  - Aalesund (2020)
- Fewest goals scored in a season (26 games): 21, Start (2002)
- Fewest goals scored in a season (18/22 games): 10, joint record:
  - Pors (1970)
  - Mjølner (1972)
- Most goals conceded in a season: 85, Aalesund (2020)
- Most goals conceded in a season (22 games): 59, Djerv 1919 (1988)
- Most goals conceded in a season (18 games): 57, Sandefjord BK (1965)
- Fewest goals conceded in a season (26/30 games): 20, Rosenborg (1997, 2017)
- Best goal difference in a season: 71, Bodø/Glimt (2020)
- Most goals scored in a season by a relegated team: 41, joint record:
  - Tromsø (2013)
  - Brann (2014)
- Most goals scored at home in a season: 59, Bodø/Glimt (2020)
- Fewest goals scored at home in a season (15 games): 10, Stabæk (2012)
- Most goals conceded at home in a season (15 games): 36, Mjøndalen (2015)
- Most goals conceded at home in a season (13 games): 38, Sogndal (1998)
- Fewest goals conceded at home in a season (15 games): 6, Brann (2016)
- Most goals scored away in a season (13 games): 44, Rosenborg (1997)
- Most goals scored away in a season (15 games): 44, Bodø/Glimt (2020)
- Fewest goals scored away in a season (15 games): 8, joint record:
  - Sandefjord (2010)
  - Start (2016)
- Most goals conceded away in a season (15 games): 41, joint record:
  - Hønefoss (2010)
  - Stabæk (2012)
- Fewest goals conceded away in a season (15 games): 10, joint record:
  - Molde (2014)
  - Rosenborg (2017, 2018)
- Most goals scored in total: 2,773, Rosenborg
- Most goals conceded in total: 1,880, Brann

=== Points ===
- Most points in a season: 81, Bodø/Glimt (2020)
- Most points in a season (26 games): 63, Rosenborg (1998)
- Most points in a season (22 games, 3 points for a win): 52, Lillestrøm (1989)
- Most points in a season (22 games, 2 points for a win): 36, Lillestrøm (1977)
- Most points in a season (18 games, 2 points for a win): 28, Lyn (1968)
- Fewest points in a season (30 games): 9, FK Haugesund (2025)
- Fewest points in a season (26 games): 11, Start (2002)
- Fewest points in a season (22 games, 3 points for a win): 12, joint record:
  - Djerv 1919 (1988)
  - Moss (1990)
- Fewest points in a season (22 games, 2 points for a win): 5, Os (1975)
- Fewest points in a season (18 games, 2 points for a win): 2, Sandefjord BK (1965)
- Most points in a season without winning the league: 62, joint record:
  - Rosenborg (2013)
  - Molde (2020)
- Fewest points in a season while winning the league (30 games): 58, Molde (2011)
- Fewest points in a season while winning the league (26 games): 46, Vålerenga (2005)
- Most points in a season while being relegated:
  - 30 games: 34, Fredrikstad (2009)
  - 26 games: 29, joint record:
    - Moss (1996)
    - Odd Grenland (2006)
- Fewest points in a season while surviving relegation (30 games): 22, Start (2015)

== Player records ==
=== Appearances ===
- Most appearances: 473, Daniel Berg Hestad (23 May 1993 to 8 November 2015)
- Most appearances at one club: 473, Daniel Berg Hestad
- Oldest player: Thorleif «Toffa» Olsen, 41 years and 332 days (for Vålerengen v. Brann, 13 October 1963)
- Youngest player: Gabriel Rajkovic, 15 years and 20 days (for Vålerenga v. Sandefjord, 15 March 2026)
- Most seasons appeared in: 22, Roar Strand (every season from 1989 to 2010)

As of match played 1 December 2024

| Rank | Player | Years | Apps |
|---|---|---|---|
| 1 | (Norway) Daniel Berg Hestad | 1993–2016 | 473 |
| 2 | (Norway) Steffen Hagen | 2006–present | 462 |
| 3 | (Norway) Morten Berre | 1996–2015 | 452 |
| 4 | (Norway) Frode Kippe | 1997–2019 | 441 |
| 5 | (Norway) Roar Strand | 1989–2010 | 439 |
| 6 | (Norway) Øyvind Storflor | 1999–2019 | 421 |
| 7 | (Norway) Erling Knudtzon | 2007–present | 420 |
| 8 | (Norway) Espen Hoff | 1999–2016 | 406 |
| 9 | (Norway) Christer Basma | 1993–2008 | 350 |
| 10 | (Norway) Håkon Opdal | 2002–2021 | 347 |

=== Goals ===
- Most goals: 172, Sigurd Rushfeldt
- Most goals at one club: 151, Harald Martin Brattbakk (Rosenborg)
- Oldest goalscorer: 41 years and 323 days, Thorleif «Toffa» Olsen (for Vålerengen v. Skeid, 4 October 1963)
- Youngest goalscorer: Martin Ødegaard, 15 years and 151 days (for Strømsgodset v. Sarpsborg 08, 16 May 2014)
- Most seasons scored in: 21, Roar Strand (every season from 1990 to 2010)

| Rank | Name | Goals | Games | Goals per game | Playing position | First goal | Last goal |
|---|---|---|---|---|---|---|---|
| 1 | (Norway) Sigurd Rushfeldt | 172 | 299 | 0.58 | Forward | 1992 | 2011 |
| 2 | (Norway) Harald Martin Brattbakk | 166 | 255 | 0.69 | Forward | 1990 | 2005 |
| 3 | (Norway) Petter Belsvik | 159 | 292 | 0.54 | Forward | 1989 | 2003 |
| 4 | (Norway) Odd Iversen | 158 | 225 | 0.70 | Forward | 1967 | 1982 |
| 5 | (Norway) Per Kristoffersen | 145^{1} | 194 | 0.75 | Forward | 1956–57 | 1968 |
| 6 | (Norway) Frode Johnsen | 132 | 301 | 0.44 | Forward | 1999 | 2015 |
| 7 | (Norway) Thorstein Helstad | 116 | 234 | 0.50 | Forward | 1995 | 2013 |
| 7 | (Norway) Bengt Sæternes | 116 | 280 | 0.41 | Forward | 1996 | 2011 |
| 9 | (Norway) Jostein Flo | 114 | 213 | 0.54 | Forward | 1987 | 2001 |
| 10 | (Norway) Arild Sundgot | 111 | 325 | 0.34 | Forward | 1995 | 2011 |

Note: ^{1} Per Kristoffersen's goals scored before 1963 are included in the statistics.

- Most goals in one season: 30, Odd Iversen (Rosenborg) in 1968
- Most Eliteserien hat-tricks: 11, Sigurd Rushfeldt
- Most goals in a game: 6, joint record:
  - Odd Iversen (for Rosenborg v. Vålerengen 20 October 1968) W 7–2
  - Jan Fuglset (for Molde v. Strømsgodset 17 October 1976) W 1–6

- Fastest goal: 11 seconds, Erik Mjelde (for Brann v. Haugesund 15 April 2011)
- Fastest hat-trick: 2 minutes 30 seconds, Erik Karlsen (for Lillestrøm v. Mjøndalen 1 May 1977)
- Most consecutive seasons to score at least 25 goals: 2, joint record:
  - Odd Iversen (1968–1969 for Rosenborg)
  - Harald Martin Brattbakk (1995–1996 for Rosenborg)
  - Sigurd Rushfeldt (1997–1998 for Rosenborg)
- Most consecutive seasons to score at least 15 goals: 4, joint record:
  - Petter Belsvik (1993 for HamKam, 1994–95 for Start, 1996 for Stabæk)
  - Harald Martin Brattbakk (1994–1997 for Rosenborg)
- Most different clubs to score for: 7, Petter Belsvik (for Molde, HamKam, Start, Stabæk, Rosenborg, Vålerenga, Lillestrøm)

=== Disciplinary ===
- Most yellow cards in a season: 10, joint record:
  - Fegor Ogude (2011)
  - Kjetil Wæhler (2016)
  - Flamur Kastrati (2018)
- Most red cards in a season: 3, joint record:
  - Raoul Kouakou (2002, 2003)
  - Frode Kippe (2007)

=== Goalkeepers ===
- Longest consecutive run without conceding a goal: 730 minutes, Sondre Rossbach (for Odd, 1 November 2015 – 24 April 2016)

=== Youngest goalscorers ===
This is a list of the top 10 youngest players to score a goal in Eliteserien.

| | Player | Date | Team | Age | Opposition |
|---|---|---|---|---|---|
| 1 | Martin Ødegaard | 16 May 2014 | Strømsgodset | 15 years, 151 days | Sarpsborg 08 |
| 2 | Håkon Lorentzen | 10 November 2013 | Brann | 16 years, 100 days | Tromsø |
| 3 | Kristoffer Ajer | 21 April 2014 | Start | 16 years, 164 days | Sarpsborg 08 |
| 4 | Kjetil Sigurdsen | 14 September 1986 | Bryne | 16 years, 207 days | Tromsø |
| 5 | Mikkel Bro Hansen | 12 September 2025 | Bodø/Glimt | 16 years, 230 days | KBK |
| 6 | Sander Svendsen | 21 April 2014 | Molde | 16 years, 259 days | Sarpsborg 08 |
| 7 | Ohi Omoijuanfo | 7 November 2010 | Lillestrøm | 16 years, 300 days | Strømsgodset |
| 8 | Kjetil Rekdal | 15 September 1985 | Molde | 16 years, 313 days | Bryne |
| 9 | Trond Fredrik Ludvigsen | 2 May 1999 | Bodø/Glimt | 16 years, 314 days | Brann |
| 10 | Benjamin Thoresen Faraas | 14 August 2022 | HamKam | 16 years, 340 days | Vålerenga |

== Match records ==
=== Scorelines ===
- Biggest home win: 10–0, Rosenborg v. Brann (5 May 1996)
- Biggest away win: 0–9, Sogndal v. Stabæk (25 October 1998)
- Biggest loss by reigning champions: 1–8
  - Lyn 1–8 Strømsgodset (16 May 1969), after Lyn won the 1968 season
- Highest scoring: 11–2, Lyn v. Viking (28 July 1968)
- Highest scoring draw: 5–5, Viking v. Vålerenga (2 August 2014)

== All-time Eliteserien table ==
The all-time Eliteserien table is a cumulative record of all match results, points and goals of every team that has played in the Eliteserien since the start of a one-league top flight in the 1961–62 season. The table that follows is accurate as of the end of the 2024 season. Teams in bold are part of the 2025 Eliteserien. Numbers in bold are the record (highest either positive or negative) numbers in each column.

| Pos. | Club | S | Pld | Win | Draw | Loss | GF | GA | GD | Pts | 1st | 2nd | 3rd | Relegated | Best Pos. |
|---|---|---|---|---|---|---|---|---|---|---|---|---|---|---|---|
| 1 | **Rosenborg** | 58 | **1448** | **779** | 338 | 331 | **2926** | 1710 | **1216** | **2675** | **26** | 7 | 5 | 2 | **1** |
| 2 | **Viking** | **58** | 1432 | 613 | **374** | 445 | 2290 | 1933 | 357 | 2213 | 8 | 2 | **10** | 3 | **1** |
| 3 | **Brann** | 54 | 1340 | 548 | 313 | **479** | 2139 | **1992** | 147 | 1957 | 3 | 7 | 4 | 7 | **1** |
| 4 | **Molde** | 46 | 1192 | 564 | 258 | 370 | 2086 | 1637 | 449 | 1950 | 5 | **11** | 3 | 5 | **1** |
| 5 | Lillestrøm | 49 | 1254 | 527 | 323 | 404 | 1988 | 1622 | 366 | 1903 | 4 | 7 | 3 | 2 | **1** |
| 6 | **Vålerenga** | 51 | 1274 | 488 | 313 | 473 | 1967 | 1861 | 106 | 1774 | 5 | 3 | 5 | 6 | **1** |
| 7 | **Tromsø** | 36 | 956 | 354 | 234 | 368 | 1338 | 1397 | −59 | 1296 | | 2 | 4 | 3 | 2 |
| 8 | **Strømsgodset** | 36 | 928 | 354 | 208 | 366 | 1477 | 1513 | −36 | 1270 | 2 | 2 | 3 | 5 | **1** |
| 9 | Start | 37 | 932 | 322 | 218 | 392 | 1351 | 1505 | −154 | 1184 | 2 | 1 | 7 | **10** | **1** |
| 10 | **Bodø/Glimt** | 29 | 774 | 318 | 185 | 271 | 1356 | 1188 | 168 | 1139 | 4 | 5 | 1 | 4 | **1** |
| 11 | Odd | 29 | 798 | 312 | 182 | 304 | 1181 | 1223 | −42 | 1117 | | 2 | 2 | 4 | 2 |
| 12 | Stabæk | 26 | 728 | 283 | 176 | 269 | 1156 | 1102 | 54 | 1025 | 1 | 1 | 4 | 4 | **1** |
| 13 | **Fredrikstad** | 27 | 618 | 237 | 149 | 232 | 942 | 926 | 16 | 860 | | 5 | 1 | 6 | 2 |
| 14 | Lyn | 27 | 614 | 228 | 147 | 239 | 962 | 977 | −15 | 831 | 2 | 3 | 4 | 7 | **1** |
| 15 | **Haugesund** | 18 | 528 | 186 | 124 | 218 | 735 | 797 | −62 | 682 | | | 1 | 2 | 3 |
| 16 | **HamKam** | 24 | 564 | 181 | 137 | 246 | 712 | 891 | −179 | 680 | | | 1 | 8 | 3 |
| 17 | Moss | 19 | 442 | 153 | 102 | 187 | 622 | 701 | −79 | 561 | 1 | 1 | | 4 | **1** |
| 18 | Kongsvinger | 18 | 424 | 154 | 90 | 180 | 600 | 700 | −100 | 554 | | 1 | 2 | 2 | 2 |
| 19 | Aalesund | 16 | 464 | 146 | 106 | 212 | 591 | 786 | −195 | 544 | | | | 5 | 4 |
| 20 | Skeid | 19 | 406 | 149 | 80 | 177 | 569 | 643 | −74 | 527 | 1 | 1 | 1 | 5 | **1** |
| 21 | Sogndal | 18 | 468 | 124 | 124 | 220 | 566 | 830 | −264 | 496 | | | | 8 | 6 |
| 22 | **Bryne** | 17 | 390 | 133 | 96 | 161 | 561 | 614 | −53 | 495 | | 2 | | 2 | 2 |
| 23 | **Sarpsborg 08** | 13 | 390 | 125 | 108 | 157 | 537 | 620 | −83 | 483 | | | 1 | 1 | 3 |
| 24 | Mjøndalen | 17 | 406 | 127 | 90 | 189 | 489 | 634 | −145 | 471 | | 2 | | 7 | 2 |
| 25 | **Sandefjord Fotball** | 12 | 352 | 86 | 77 | 189 | 435 | 642 | −207 | 335 | | | | 4 | 8 |
| 26 | **Kristiansund** | 7 | 210 | 73 | 59 | 78 | 298 | 324 | −26 | 278 | | | | 1 | 5 |
| 27 | Sarpsborg FK^{1} | 11 | 206 | 71 | 49 | 86 | 253 | 295 | −42 | 262 | | | 2 | 2 | 3 |
| 28 | Frigg | 9 | 178 | 60 | 51 | 67 | 235 | 298 | −63 | 231 | | | | 3 | 4 |
| 29 | Steinkjer | 7 | 124 | 45 | 29 | 50 | 203 | 209 | −6 | 164 | | 1 | | 3 | 2 |
| 30 | Hødd | 6 | 120 | 28 | 25 | 67 | 146 | 240 | −94 | 109 | | | | 3 | 8 |
| 31 | Eik Tønsberg | 4 | 96 | 28 | 20 | 48 | 126 | 184 | −58 | 104 | | | | 2 | 5 |
| 32 | Hønefoss | 3 | 90 | 20 | 29 | 41 | 92 | 151 | −59 | 89 | | | | 2 | 13 |
| 33 | Sandnes Ulf | 3 | 90 | 21 | 24 | 45 | 107 | 167 | −60 | 87 | | | | 1 | 13 |
| 34 | Fyllingen | 3 | 66 | 17 | 19 | 30 | 65 | 106 | −41 | 70 | | | | 2 | 7 |
| 35 | Ranheim | 2 | 60 | 19 | 12 | 29 | 79 | 105 | −26 | 69 | | | | 1 | 7 |
| 36 | Sandefjord BK | 3 | 66 | 17 | 10 | 39 | 64 | 131 | −67 | 61 | | | | 1 | 7 |
| 37 | Raufoss | 3 | 62 | 11 | 15 | 36 | 59 | 117 | −58 | 48 | | | | 2 | 9 |
| 38 | Lisleby | 2 | 48 | 12 | 8 | 28 | 64 | 100 | −36 | 44 | | | | 1 | 9 |
| 39 | **KFUM** | 1 | 30 | 9 | 10 | 11 | 35 | 36 | −1 | 37 | | | | 0 | 8 |
| 40 | Strindheim | 2 | 48 | 9 | 10 | 29 | 54 | 114 | −60 | 37 | | | | 2 | 12 |
| 41 | Mjølner | 2 | 44 | 7 | 9 | 28 | 33 | 83 | −50 | 30 | | | | 2 | 12 |
| 42 | Strømmen | 2 | 44 | 6 | 9 | 29 | 39 | 80 | −41 | 27 | | | | 2 | 11 |
| 43 | Ørn Horten | 1 | 30 | 7 | 3 | 20 | 45 | 91 | −46 | 24 | | | | 1 | 14 |
| 44 | Jerv | 1 | 30 | 5 | 5 | 20 | 30 | 69 | −39 | 20 | | | | 1 | 16 |
| 45 | Greåker | 1 | 30 | 4 | 8 | 18 | 35 | 75 | −40 | 20 | | | | 1 | 15 |
| 46 | Haugar | 1 | 22 | 2 | 12 | 8 | 20 | 38 | −18 | 18 | | | | 1 | 11 |
| 47 | Gjøvik-Lyn^{2} | 1 | 18 | 5 | 1 | 12 | 29 | 47 | −18 | 16 | | | | 1 | 10 |
| 48 | Vard Haugesund | 1 | 22 | 2 | 9 | 11 | 21 | 36 | −15 | 15 | | | | 1 | 12 |
| 49 | Djerv 1919 | 1 | 22 | 3 | 4 | 15 | 17 | 59 | −42 | 13 | | | | 1 | 12 |
| 50 | Larvik Turn | 1 | 30 | 3 | 4 | 23 | 35 | 90 | −55 | 13 | | | | 1 | 16 |
| 51 | Pors | 1 | 18 | 3 | 1 | 14 | 10 | 46 | −36 | 10 | | | | 1 | 10 |
| 52 | Os | 1 | 22 | 0 | 5 | 17 | 15 | 50 | −35 | 5 | | | | 1 | 12 |

League at the beginning of 2025:

| Eliteserien |
| First Division |
| Second Division |
| Third Division |
| Fourth Division or lower |

- ^{1}By a 2007 agreement, Sarpsborg FK merged into Sarpsborg 08, and Sarpsborg FK continued as an amateur club, currently playing in the 4. divisjon.
- ^{2}By a 2013 agreement, SK Gjøvik-Lyn merged with Gjøvik Fotballforening and changed the club's name to Fotballklubben Gjøvik-Lyn. FK Gjøvik-Lyn regards itself as custodian of SK Gjøvik-Lyn's statistics.

| Leaders | Years | Seasons |
|---|---|---|
| Brann | 1961–1963 | 2 |
| Lyn | 1964–1971 | 8 |
| Fredrikstad | 1972–1974 | 3 |
| Viking | 1975–1991 | 17 |
| Rosenborg | 1992–Present | 33 |

== Managers ==
- Most Eliteserien titles: 15, Nils Arne Eggen (Rosenborg in 1971, 1988, 1990, 1992, 1993, 1994, 1995, 1996, 1997, 1999, 2000, 2001, 2002 and 2010 and Moss in 1987)
- Most consecutive Eliteserien titles: 6, Nils Arne Eggen (Rosenborg in 1992, 1993, 1994, 1995, 1996, 1997)
