= 1966 in Norwegian football =

Football in Norway
- Season: 1966

Men's football
- 1. divisjon: Skeid
- 2. divisjon: Strømsgodset (Group A); Rosenborg (Group B)
- NM: Fredrikstad

The 1966 season was the 61st season of competitive football in Norway.

== 1. divisjon ==
Pos	Team	Pld	W	D	L	GF	GA	GD	Pts	Qualification or relegation
1	Skeid (C)	18	9	7	2	31	20	+11	25	Qualification for the European Cup first round
2	Fredrikstad	18	10	4	4	37	20	+17	24	Qualification for the Cup Winners' Cup first round
3	Lyn	18	6	9	3	28	24	+4	21	Qualification for the Inter-Cities Fairs Cup first round
4	Frigg	18	8	4	6	21	15	+6	20	
5	Vålerengen	18	9	1	8	32	35	−3	19	
6	Steinkjer	18	7	3	8	31	29	+2	17	
7	Odd	18	5	4	9	21	29	−8	14	
8	Sarpsborg FK	18	4	6	8	16	24	−8	14	
9	Lisleby (R)	18	4	5	9	22	26	−4	13	Relegation to Second Division
10	Hødd (R)	18	5	3	10	29	46	−17	13	Relegation to Second Division

Source: NIFS
Rules for classification: 1) points; 2) goal difference; 3) number of goals scored.
(C) Champions; (R) Relegated

== 2. divisjon ==
=== Group A ===
Pos	Team	Pld	W	D	L	GF	GA	GD	Pts	Promotion, qualification or relegation
1	Strømsgodset (C, P)	14	9	2	3	51	27	+24	20	Promotion to First Division
2	Aurskog	14	8	4	2	41	24	+17	20	
3	Gjøvik-Lyn	14	6	3	5	36	29	+7	15	
4	Eik	14	6	3	5	25	28	−3	15	
5	Snøgg	14	5	3	6	30	32	−2	13	
6	Raufoss	14	4	4	6	24	27	−3	12	
7	Sandefjord (R)	14	4	4	6	21	30	−9	12	Relegation to Third Division
8	Lillestrøm (R)	14	1	3	10	25	56	−31	5	Relegation to Third Division

Source: rsssf.no
Rules for classification: 1) points; 2) goal difference; 3) number of goals scored.
(C) Champions; (P) Promoted; (R) Relegated

=== Group B ===
Pos	Team	Pld	W	D	L	GF	GA	GD	Pts	Promotion, qualification or relegation
1	Rosenborg (C, P)	14	12	1	1	38	11	+27	25	Promotion to First Division
2	Viking	14	8	2	4	24	20	+4	18	
3	Brann	14	7	2	5	19	13	+6	16	
4	Nidelv	14	6	2	6	28	24	+4	14	
5	Bryne	14	6	1	7	21	23	−2	13	
6	Start	14	4	3	7	26	23	+3	11	
7	Baune (R)	14	4	0	10	17	36	−19	8	Relegation to Third Division
8	Falken (R)	14	3	1	10	20	43	−23	7	Relegation to Third Division

Source: rsssf.no
Rules for classification: 1) points; 2) goal difference; 3) number of goals scored.
(C) Champions; (P) Promoted; (R) Relegated

== 3. divisjon ==
=== Group Østland/Søndre ===
Team	G	W	D	L	Goals	P	Notes
Ørn	14	10	2	2	36-19	22	Promoted
Pors	14	9	2	3	24-16	20
Larvik Turn	14	5	6	3	21-13	16
Østsiden	14	5	4	5	22-15	14
Moss	14	5	3	6	16-21	13
Runar	14	5	3	6	21-27	13
Askim	14	3	1	10	16-26	7	Relegated
Gvarv	14	2	3	9	15-35	7	Relegated

=== Group Østland/Nordre ===
Team	G	W	D	L	Goals	P	Notes
Mjøndalen	14	9	3	2	33-18	21	Promoted
Strømmen	14	7	5	2	28-20	19
Sagene	14	7	2	5	24-18	16
Moelven	14	6	3	5	18-25	15
Hamarkameratene	14	5	3	6	29-24	13
Hamar IL	14	4	4	6	23-23	12
Drafn	14	4	3	7	21-22	11	Relegated
Kongsvinger	14	0	5	9	12-38	5	Relegated

=== Group Sørland/Vestland, A ===
Team	G	W	D	L	Goals	P	Notes
Vigør	14	9	4	1	41-17	22	Play-off
Flekkefjord	14	10	0	4	35-16	20
Donn	14	6	5	3	31-16	17
Jerv	14	6	4	4	44-26	16
Øyestad	14	5	3	6	23-39	13
Grane Arendal	14	2	5	7	17-28	9
Sørfjell	14	3	3	8	21-44	9
Mandalskameratene	14	1	4	9	15-41	6	Relegated

=== Group Sørland/Vestland, B ===
Team	G	W	D	L	Goals	P	Notes
Vard	14	12	0	2	52-17	24	Play-off
Jarl	14	9	1	4	31-18	19
Buøy	14	6	5	3	29-16	17
Haugar	14	7	2	5	28-21	16
Ulf	14	7	2	5	23-25	16
Vidar	14	4	4	6	22-28	12
Nærbø	14	2	1	11	11-33	5	Relegated
Randaberg	14	1	1	12	10-48	3	Relegated

=== Group Sørland/Vestland, C ===
Team	G	W	D	L	Goals	P	Notes
Os	14	8	4	2	19-9	20	Play-off
Sogndal	14	7	3	4	32-14	17
Varegg	14	7	3	4	34-18	17
Årstad	14	3	9	2	16-13	15
Ny-Krohnborg	14	5	4	5	26-25	14
Sandviken	14	4	5	5	19-19	13	Relegated
Jotun	14	5	3	6	23-27	13	Relegated
Sandane	14	1	1	12	12-56	3	Relegated

=== Group Møre ===
Team	G	W	D	L	Goals	P	Notes
Herd	14	11	1	2	38-11	23	Play-off
Molde	14	9	1	4	35-18	19
Aalesund	14	8	2	4	29-23	18
Velled./Ringen	14	6	2	6	24-30	14
Langevåg	14	6	1	7	34-27	13
Clausenengen	14	4	3	7	26-32	11
Braatt	14	2	3	9	13-32	7	Relegated
Åndalsnes	14	2	3	9	17-43	7	Relegated

=== Group Trøndelag ===
Team	G	W	D	L	Goals	P	Notes
Kvik (Trondheim)	14	9	3	2	39-13	21	Play-off
Nessegutten	14	8	4	2	34-23	20
Løkken	14	7	2	5	26-21	16
Sverre	14	5	4	5	19-19	14
Freidig	14	5	3	6	18-25	13
Verdal	14	2	7	5	26-32	11
Hasselvika	14	3	3	8	17-30	9	Relegated
Stjørdals/Blink	14	1	6	7	19-35	8	Relegated

=== District IX ===
Team	G	W	D	L	Goals	P	Notes
Mo	10	8	2	0	36-5	18
Bodø/Glimt	10	7	2	1	37-9	16
Stålkameratene	10	6	1	3	27-12	13
Mosjøen	10	3	1	6	22-32	7	Relegated
Brønnøysund	10	2	0	8	8-34	4	Relegated
Grand	10	1	0	9	11-49	2	Relegated

=== District X ===
Team	G	W	D	L	Goals	P	Notes
Mjølner	10	8	0	2	42-10	16
Harstad	10	8	0	2	34-13	16
Narvik/Nor	10	5	2	3	20-15	12
Lyngen	10	3	4	3	18-30	10	Relegated
Tromsø	10	2	2	6	12-25	6	Relegated
Bardufoss/Omegn	10	0	0	10	11-44	0	Relegated

=== District XI ===
Team	G	W	D	L	Goals	P	Notes
Stein	10	6	1	3	28-16	13
Kirkenes	10	6	1	3	18-18	13
Norild	10	6	0	4	25-15	12
Alta	10	5	1	4	20-14	11
Kvalsund	10	3	1	6	13-27	7
Vardø	10	1	2	7	12-26	4	Relegated

=== Play-off Sørland/Vestland ===
- Vigør - Vard 2-2
- Vard - Os 1-0
- Os - Vigør 1-2

Team	G	W	D	L	Goals	P	Notes
Vigør	2	1	1	0	4-3	3	Promoted
Vard	2	1	1	0	3-2	3
Os	2	0	0	2	1-3	0

=== Play-off Møre/Trøndelag ===
- Kvik - Herd 2-1
- Herd - Kvik 2-2 (agg. 3-4)
- Kvik (Trondheim) promoted

=== Northern Norway Championship ===
- Mjølner - Stein 5-0
- Mo - Mjølner 1-3
- Stein - Mo (Cancelled)

Team	G	W	D	L	Goals	P	Notes
Mjølner	2	2	0	0	8-1	4	champion
Mo	1	0	0	1	1-3	0
Stein	1	0	0	1	0-5	0

== 4. divisjon ==
=== District I ===
Team	Notes
Sparta	Play-off
Kvik Halden
Torp
Greåker
Navestad
Selbak
Ørje
Gresvik
Sprint/Jeløy
Lervik

=== District II, Group A ===
Team	Notes
Kongsberg	Play-off
Slemmestad
Svelvik
Skiold
Åssiden
Liv
Drammens BK
Geithus

=== District II, Group B ===
Team	Notes
Stabæk	Play-off
Flisa
Asker
Liull
Eidsvold Turn
Spartacus
Raumnes/Årnes
Kjellmyra

=== District III, Group A (Oplandene) ===
Team	Notes
Mesna	Play-off
Brumunddal
Redalen
Fremad
Vardal
Lena
Stange
Vang

=== District III, Group B1 (Sør-Østerdal) ===
Team	Notes
Nordre Trysil	Play-off
Ytre Rendal
Nybergsund
Elverum
Koppang
Engerdal
Trysilgutten
Vestre Trysil

=== District III, Group B2 (Nord-Østerdal) ===
Team	Notes
Røros	Play-off
Brekken
Tynset
Folldal
Nansen
Ålen
Os (Østerdalen)
Kvikne

=== District III, Group B3 (Sør-Gudbrandsdal) ===
Team	Notes
Faaberg	Play-off
Kvam
Follebu
Østre Gausdal
Vinstra
Fåvang

=== District III, Group B4 (Nord-Gudbrandsdal) ===
Team	Notes
Sel	Play-off
Faukstad
Vågå
Otta
Dovre
Lesja

=== District IV, Group A (Vestfold) ===
Team	Notes
Fram Larvik	Play-off
Stag
Tønsberg Turn
Halsen
Falk
Holmestrand
Sandar
Store Bergan
Tønsbergkameratene
Sem

=== District IV, Group B (Grenland) ===
Team	Notes
Brevik	Play-off
Borg
Urædd
Herkules
Kragerø
Langesund
Skiens-Grane
Skidar

=== District IV, Group B (Øvre Telemark) ===
Team	Notes
Heddal	Play-off
Ulefoss
Kjapp
Snøgg 2
Drangedal
Skade
Rjukan
Kjosen
Seljord
Skarphedin

=== District V, Group A1 (Aust-Agder) ===
Team	Notes
Rygene	Promoted
Risør
Tvedestrand
Arendals BK
Dristug
Lillesand
Trauma	Withdrew

=== District V, Group A2 (Vest-Agder) ===
Team	Notes
Vindbjart	Promoted
Våg
Giv Akt
Kvinesdal
Farsund
Lyngdal
Just

=== District V, Group B1 (Rogaland) ===
Team	Notes
Ålgård	Play-off
Klepp
Sola
Egersund
Varhaug
Vigrestad
Brusand
Havørn

=== District V, Group B2 (Rogaland) ===
Team	Notes
Stavanger IF	Play-off
Engøy
Kopervik
Pol
Brodd
Djerv 1919
Nord
Åkra

=== District V, Group B3 (Sunnhordland) ===
Team	Notes
Odda	Play-off
Fonna
Bremnes
Stord
Etne
Trio
Halsnøy

=== District VI, Group A (Bergen) ===
Team	Notes
Nymark	Play-off
Djerv
Fjellkameratene
Nordnes
Hardy
Laksevåg
Trane

=== District VI, Group B (Midthordland) ===
Team	Notes
Florvåg	Play-off
Fana
Arna
Erdal
Voss
Radøy
Ramsøy

=== District VI, Group C (Sogn og fjordane) ===
Team	Notes
Tornado	Play-off
Eid
Høyang
Måløy
Syrstrand
Florø
Haugen
Dale (Sunnfjord)

=== District VII, Group A (Sunnmøre) ===
Team	Notes
Spjelkavik	Play-off
Skarbøvik
Ørsta
Rollon
Valder
Bergsøy
Sykkylven
Stordal

=== District VII, Group B (Romsdal) ===
Team	Notes
Nord-Gossen	Play-off
Eidsvåg
Træff
Bryn
Fiksdal
Fræna
Eide
Rival

=== District VII, Group C (Nordmøre) ===
Team	Notes
Kristiansund	Play-off
Todalen
Bøfjord
Sunndal
Søya
Surnadal
Nordlandet
Dahle

=== District VIII, Group A (Sør-Trøndelag) ===
Team	Notes
Orkdal	Play-off
Rindal
Melhus
Flå
Orkanger
Glimt Gjølme
Troll
Skaun

=== District VIII, Group B (Trondheim) ===
Team	Notes
Brage	Play-off
Ranheim
Sverresborg
Heimdal
Selsbakk
Astor
Tryggkameratene
Trondheims/Ørn

=== District VIII, Group C (Fosen) ===
Team	Notes
Brekstad	Play-off
Leksvik
Stadsbygd
Fevåg
Opphaug
Rissa
Beian

=== District VIII, Group D (Nord-Trøndelag/Namdal) ===
Team	Notes
Namsos	Play-off
Fram Skatval
Neset
Henning
Beitstad
Bangsund
Aasguten
Skogn

=== Play-off District I/IV ===
- Heddal - Fram 1-1
- Brevik - Sparta 3-2
- Sparta - Heddal 1-2
- Fram - Brevik 6-0
- Sparta - Frem 1-2
- Brevik - Heddal 2-2

Team	G	W	D	L	Goals	P	Notes
Fram Larvik	3	2	1	0	9-2	5	Promoted
Heddal	3	1	2	0	5-4	4	Promoted
Brevik	3	1	1	1	5-10	3
Sparta	3	0	0	3	4-7	0

=== Play-off District II/III ===
- Røros - Nordre Trysil 2-6
- Faaberg - Sel 4-3
- Faaberg - Nordre Trysil 5-2
- Faaberg - Stabæk 2-3
- Kongsberg - Mesna 0-0
- Stabæk - Kongsberg 3-1
- Mesna - Faaberg 1-0
- Mesna - Stabæk 2-2
- Kongsberg - Faaberg 2-1

Team	G	W	D	L	Goals	P	Notes
Stabæk	3	2	1	0	8-5	5	Promoted
Mesna	3	1	2	0	3-2	4	Promoted
Kongsberg	3	1	1	1	3-4	3
Faaberg	3	0	0	3	3-6	0

=== Play-off District V ===
- Odda - Stavanger 2-0
- Ålgård - Odda 2-2
- Stavanger - Ålgård 3-4

Team	G	W	D	L	Goals	P	Notes
Odda	2	1	1	0	4-2	3	Promoted
Ålgård	2	1	1	0	6-5	3	Promoted
Stavanger IF	2	0	0	2	3-6	0

=== Championship District V ===
- Vindbjart - Rygene 9-1
- Vindbjart - Odda (not played)

=== Play-off District VI ===
- Florvåg - Tornado 5-2
- Tornado - Nymark 1-1
- Nymark - Florvåg 3-1

Team	G	W	D	L	Goals	P	Notes
Nymark	2	1	1	0	4-2	3	Promoted
Florvåg	2	1	0	1	6-5	2	Promoted
Tornado	2	0	1	1	3-6	1

=== Play-off District VII ===
- Spjelkavik - Kristiansund 0-0
- Nord-Gossen - Spjelkavik 1-1
- Kristiansund - Nord-Gossen 2-0

Team	G	W	D	L	Goals	P	Notes
Kristiansund	2	1	1	0	2-0	3	Promoted
Spjelkavik	2	0	2	0	1-1	2	Promoted
Nord-Gossen	2	0	1	1	1-3	1

=== Play-off District VIII ===
- Namsos - Brekstad 4-3
- Orkdal - Brage 1-0
- Brekstad - Brage 3-3
- Namsos - Orkdal 3-2
- Brage - Namsos 1-0
- Brekstad - Orkdal 3-3

Team	G	W	D	L	Goals	P	Notes
Namsos	3	2	0	1	7-6	4	Promoted
Brekstad	3	1	1	1	9-9	Promoted
Orkdal	3	1	1	1	6-6	3
Brage	3	1	0	2	3-4	2

== Norwegian Cup ==
=== Final ===
30 October 1966

Fredrikstad	3–2	Lyn
Borgen 33', 59'; Pedersen 89' (pen.)	Report	Berg 54'; Stavrum 67'

Ullevaal Stadion, Oslo
Attendance: 30,335
Referee: Hans Granlund (Heggedal)

== Northern Norwegian Cup ==
=== Final ===
Mjølner	3–1	Bodø/Glimt
	Report

== European Cup ==
=== Norwegian representatives ===
- Vålerengen (Champions Cup)
- Skeid (Cup Winners Cup)
- Frigg (Fairs Cup)

=== Champions Cup ===
==== First round ====
17 Nentori Tirana (Albania) withdrew and Vålerengen had a walkover.

==== Second round ====
October 25: Vålerengen - Linfield (Northern Ireland) 1–4

November 8: Linfield - Vålerengen 1–1 (agg. 5–2)

=== Cup Winners' Cup ===
==== First round ====
August 30: Skeid - Zaragoza (Spain) 3–2

October 12: Zaragoza - Skeid 3–1 (agg. 5–4)

=== Fairs Cup ===
==== First round ====
August 24: Frigg - Dunfermline (Scotland) 1–3

September 28: Dunfermline - Frigg 3–1 (agg. 6–2)

== National team ==
Date	Venue	Opponent	Res.*	Competition	Norwegian goalscorers
June 12	Lisbon	Portugal	0–4	Friendly
June 26	Copenhagen	Denmark	1–0	Friendly	Erik Johansen
June 29	Oslo	England	1–6	Friendly	Harald Sunde
August 14	Stavanger	Finland	1–1	Friendly	Arne Knut Pedersen
September 18	Oslo	Sweden	2–4	Friendly	Kjetil Hasund, Harald Johan Berg
November 13	Sofia	Bulgaria	2–4	ECQ	Kjetil Hasund (2)
November 19	Cologne	West Germany	0–3	Friendly

Note: Norway's goals first
Explanation:

- ECQ = European Championship Qualifier
