= 1972 in Norwegian football =

Football in Norway
- Season: 1972

Men's football
- 1. divisjon: Viking
- 2. divisjon: Start (Group A); Frigg (Group B)
- Cupen: Brann

The 1972 season was the 67th season of competitive football in Norway.

Viking FK won the title on goal difference with Fredrikstad FK finishing runners-up, while Jan Erik Osland's goal gave SK Brann a 1–0 win over Rosenborg BK in the Norwegian cup final.

== Men's football ==
=== League season ===
==== Promotion and relegation ====
League	Promoted to league	Relegated from league
1. divisjon	Mjøndalen; Skeid; Mjølner	Frigg
2. divisjon	Brumunddal; Bryne; Clausenengen; Florvåg; Moss; Sandefjord BK; Vålerengen; Verdal	Drafn; Aurskog; Eidsvold Turn; Svolvær

==== 1. divisjon ====
Viking FK won the championship, their second league title.

Pos	Team	Pld	W	D	L	GF	GA	GD	Pts	Qualification or relegation
1	Viking (C)	22	16	2	4	42	15	+27	34	Qualification for the European Cup first round
2	Fredrikstad	22	16	2	4	31	16	+15	34	Qualification for the UEFA Cup first round
3	Strømsgodset	22	10	7	5	40	29	+11	27	Qualification for the UEFA Cup first round
4	Rosenborg	22	6	10	6	22	19	+3	22	
5	Lyn	22	7	7	8	29	22	+7	21	
6	Skeid	22	8	5	9	26	26	0	21	
7	Mjøndalen	22	9	3	10	31	36	−5	21	
8	Brann	22	7	6	9	22	23	−1	20	Qualification for the Cup Winners' Cup first round
9	HamKam	22	6	8	8	14	18	−4	20	
10	Sarpsborg FK (R)	22	6	6	10	21	30	−9	18	Relegation to Second Division
11	Hødd (R)	22	4	6	12	18	39	−21	14	Relegation to Second Division
12	Mjølner (R)	22	3	6	13	10	33	−23	12	Relegation to Second Division

Source: NIFS
Rules for classification: 1) points; 2) goal difference; 3) number of goals scored.
(C) Champions; (R) Relegated

==== 2. divisjon ====
===== Group A =====
Pos	Team	Pld	W	D	L	GF	GA	GD	Pts	Promotion, qualification or relegation
1	Start (C, P)	18	10	4	4	29	23	+6	24	Promotion to First Division
2	Pors	18	11	0	7	35	16	+19	22	Qualification for the promotion play-offs
3	Østsiden	18	9	4	5	22	17	+5	22	
4	Moss	18	8	5	5	29	20	+9	21	
5	Odd	18	7	5	6	22	21	+1	19	
6	Sandefjord BK	18	6	4	8	24	25	−1	16	
7	Florvåg	18	6	4	8	31	34	−3	16	
8	Vard	18	6	4	8	23	26	−3	16	
9	Bryne (O)	18	6	2	10	21	30	−9	14	Qualification for the relegation play-offs
10	Ulf (R)	18	3	4	11	18	42	−24	10	Relegation to Third Division

Source: rsssf.no
Rules for classification: 1) points; 2) goal difference; 3) number of goals scored.
(C) Champions; (O) Play-off winners; (P) Promoted; (R) Relegated

===== Group B =====
Pos	Team	Pld	W	D	L	GF	GA	GD	Pts	Promotion, qualification or relegation
1	Frigg (C, P)	18	13	3	2	45	16	+29	29	Promotion to First Division
2	Raufoss (O, P)	18	12	2	4	41	15	+26	26	Qualification for the promotion play-offs
3	Steinkjer	18	9	6	3	28	16	+12	24	
4	Stabæk	18	8	5	5	23	13	+10	21	
5	Molde	18	9	3	6	29	23	+6	21	
6	Aalesund	18	7	4	7	16	16	0	18	
7	Clausenengen	18	5	6	7	18	27	−9	16	
8	Vålerengen	18	5	4	9	15	18	−3	14	
9	Brumunddal (R)	18	3	4	11	15	36	−21	10	Qualification for the relegation play-offs
10	Verdal (R)	18	0	1	17	6	56	−50	1	Relegation to Third Division

Source: rsssf.no
Rules for classification: 1) points; 2) goal difference; 3) number of goals scored.
(C) Champions; (O) Play-off winners; (P) Promoted; (R) Relegated

===== District IX–X =====
Pos	Team	Pld	W	D	L	GF	GA	GD	Pts	Qualification or relegation
1	Mo (C)	14	10	3	1	32	12	+20	23	Qualification for the promotion play-offs
2	Bodø/Glimt	14	4	8	2	23	10	+13	16	
3	Harstad	14	6	4	4	29	18	+11	16	
4	Mosjøen	14	5	5	4	21	15	+6	15	
5	Stålkameratene	14	6	3	5	18	13	+5	15	
6	Lyngen (R)	14	4	7	3	13	16	−3	15	Relegation to Third Division
7	Tromsø (R)	14	3	3	8	12	23	−11	9	Relegation to Third Division
8	Saltdalkameratene (R)	14	1	1	12	9	50	−41	3	Relegation to Third Division

Source: rsssf.no
Rules for classification: 1) points; 2) goal difference; 3) number of goals scored.
(C) Champions; (R) Relegated

===== District XI =====
Pos	Team	Pld	W	D	L	GF	GA	GD	Pts	Relegation
1	Stein (C)	12	9	1	2	33	10	+23	19	
2	Norild	12	7	3	2	17	7	+10	17	
3	Vadsø Turn	12	4	5	3	16	13	+3	13	
4	Kirkenes	12	5	2	5	25	20	+5	12	
5	Polarstjernen	12	2	5	5	10	20	−10	9	
6	Rafsbotn	12	4	1	7	17	32	−15	9	
7	Sandnes (R)	12	2	1	9	14	30	−16	5	Relegation to Third Division

Source: rsssf.no
Rules for classification: 1) points; 2) goal difference; 3) number of goals scored.
(C) Champions; (R) Relegated

=== Norwegian Cup ===
==== Final ====
22 October 1972
13:15 CET (UTC+1)

Brann	1–0	Rosenborg
Osland 13'	Report

Ullevaal Stadion, Oslo
Attendance: 17,700
Referee: Kjell Wahlen (Skeid)

== UEFA competitions ==
=== European Cup ===
==== First round ====
Team 1	Agg.	Team 2	1st leg	2nd leg
Celtic (Scotland)	5–2	(Norway) Rosenborg	2–1	3–1

=== European Cup Winners' Cup ===
==== First round ====
Team 1	Agg.	Team 2	1st leg	2nd leg
Hajduk Split (Socialist Federal Republic of Yugoslavia)	2–0	(Norway) Fredrikstad	1–0	1–0

=== UEFA Cup ===
==== First round ====
Team 1	Agg.	Team 2	1st leg	2nd leg
Lyn (Norway)	3–12	(England) Tottenham	3–6 (Report)	0–6 (Report)
Viking (Norway)	1–0	(Iceland) IBV	1–0 (Report)	0–0 (Report)

==== Second round ====
Team 1	Agg.	Team 2	1st leg	2nd leg
Viking (Norway)	2–9	(West Germany) 1. FC Köln	1–0 (Report)	1–9 (Report)

== National team ==
=== Results ===
23 February 1972 Friendly	Israel	2–1	Norway	Tel Aviv, Israel
CET (UTC+1)	Nur Bar 32', 73'	Report	Tor Egil Johansen 29'	Stadium: Bloomfield Stadium; Attendance: 12,000; Referee: Anton Bucheli (Sweden)
