= 2007 Norwegian First Division =

1. divisjon
- Season: 2007
- Dates: 9 April – 4 November
- Champions: Molde
- Promoted: Molde; HamKam; Bodø/Glimt
- Relegated: Raufoss; Tromsdalen; Skeid; Mandalskameratene
- Matches: 240
- Goals: 787 (3.28 per match)
- Top goalscorer: Kenneth Kvalheim (23 goals)
- Biggest home win: Molde 12–1 Mandalskameratene (26 August 2007)
- Biggest away win: Hønefoss 0–5 Kongsvinger (4 November 2007)
- Highest scoring: Molde 12–1 Mandalskameratene (26 August 2007)

2007 Clubs

The 2007 1. divisjon season (referred to as Adeccoligaen for sponsorship reasons) was a Norwegian second-tier football season. The season began on 9 April 2007 and concluded on 4 November 2007. It was the tenth and final season in which teams competed for two automatic promotion spots and one playoff spot.

The 1. divisjon was won by Molde, who finished one point ahead of Ham-Kam. Both clubs were relegated from the Tippeligaen in 2006 and were promoted back to the highest level after only one season. Bodø/Glimt finished third and defeated Odd Grenland in the playoff to earn promotion.

Of the four teams promoted from the 2. divisjon in 2006, only Notodden managed to hold on to their spot. They played in the 1. divisjon for the first time in their history, finishing in ninth place (Snøgg and Heddal, the club's predecessors, have both played in the second tier, last in 1967 and 1961 respectively).

Raufoss returned to the 1. divisjon after being relegated in 2004 and were able to finish in eleventh place. However, due to financial problems and failure to meet demands on infrastructure, the Football Association of Norway decided not to award Raufoss the required license for play in the top two divisions. Raufoss were demoted to the 2. divisjon and their place given to Sparta Sarpsborg, who finished in thirteenth place.

Mandalskameratene and Skeid were relegated to the 2. divisjon after one season. They were joined by Tromsdalen, who survived for two seasons.

== League table ==
| Pos | Team | Pld | W | D | L | GF | GA | GD | Pts | Promotion or relegation |
|---|---|---|---|---|---|---|---|---|---|---|
| 1 | Molde (C, P) | 30 | 22 | 3 | 5 | 62 | 28 | +34 | 69 | Promotion to Tippeligaen |
| 2 | Ham-Kam (P) | 30 | 21 | 5 | 4 | 82 | 36 | +46 | 68 | Promotion to Tippeligaen |
| 3 | Bodø/Glimt (O, P) | 30 | 17 | 4 | 9 | 66 | 39 | +27 | 55 | Qualification for the promotion play-offs (Note: The third-placed team in the 1. divisjon and the 12th-placed team in the Tippeligaen met in a playoff at the end of the season.) |
| 4 | Kongsvinger | 30 | 16 | 5 | 9 | 56 | 42 | +14 | 53 | |
| 5 | Moss | 30 | 15 | 8 | 7 | 46 | 37 | +9 | 53 | |
| 6 | Bryne | 30 | 14 | 7 | 9 | 57 | 38 | +19 | 49 | |
| 7 | Sogndal | 30 | 13 | 5 | 12 | 48 | 44 | +4 | 44 | |
| 8 | Haugesund | 30 | 10 | 9 | 11 | 49 | 52 | −3 | 39 | |
| 9 | Notodden | 30 | 11 | 3 | 16 | 49 | 54 | −5 | 36 | |
| 10 | Hønefoss | 30 | 8 | 11 | 11 | 34 | 52 | −18 | 35 | |
| 11 | Raufoss (Note: Raufoss were relegated after failing to obtain a license due to financial irregularities. Sarpsborg Sparta, who were relegated initially, were given Raufoss spot in the following season.) (R) | 30 | 10 | 5 | 15 | 37 | 61 | −24 | 35 | Relegation to Second Division |
| 12 | Løv-Ham | 30 | 9 | 6 | 15 | 39 | 44 | −5 | 33 | |
| 13 | Sarpsborg Sparta | 30 | 8 | 8 | 14 | 50 | 52 | −2 | 32 | |
| 14 | Tromsdalen (R) | 30 | 7 | 8 | 15 | 37 | 56 | −19 | 29 | Relegation to Second Division |
| 15 | Skeid (R) | 30 | 4 | 8 | 18 | 32 | 60 | −28 | 20 | Relegation to Second Division |
| 16 | Mandalskameratene (R) | 30 | 4 | 7 | 19 | 43 | 92 | −49 | 19 | Relegation to Second Division |

Source: nifs.no
Rules for classification: 1) points; 2) goal difference; 3) number of goals scored.
(C) Champions; (O) Play-off winners; (P) Promoted; (R) Relegated

== Results ==
| Home \ Away | B/G | BFK | HAM | FKH | HBK | KIL | LØV | MAN | MOL | MOS | NFK | RIL | SKD | SDL | SS | TUIL |
|---|---|---|---|---|---|---|---|---|---|---|---|---|---|---|---|---|
| Bodø/Glimt | — | 2–0 | 6–1 | 3–0 | 3–1 | 1–1 | 3–1 | 8–1 | 1–2 | 1–2 | 2–0 | 5–0 | 4–1 | 2–0 | 2–0 | 2–1 |
| Bryne | 0–2 | — | 3–0 | 4–2 | 0–0 | 1–2 | 1–1 | 3–0 | 2–0 | 1–2 | 3–2 | 6–0 | 3–0 | 2–1 | 3–1 | 4–0 |
| Ham-Kam | 2–3 | 2–1 | — | 3–3 | 2–0 | 4–0 | 1–1 | 6–0 | 0–2 | 1–1 | 3–1 | 5–0 | 5–1 | 3–0 | 2–0 | 5–0 |
| Haugesund | 2–1 | 2–2 | 2–4 | — | 0–0 | 2–2 | 3–0 | 2–1 | 2–4 | 2–2 | 2–1 | 1–2 | 1–1 | 3–1 | 2–1 | 4–1 |
| Hønefoss | 0–0 | 1–4 | 2–2 | 1–1 | — | 0–5 | 1–0 | 2–1 | 0–3 | 0–1 | 4–1 | 1–0 | 4–3 | 0–0 | 2–2 | 2–2 |
| Kongsvinger | 1–4 | 0–0 | 0–1 | 0–2 | 3–0 | — | 0–1 | 3–2 | 1–2 | 2–1 | 2–1 | 2–1 | 2–0 | 2–4 | 3–0 | 4–1 |
| Løv-Ham | 4–0 | 2–1 | 1–3 | 4–1 | 3–1 | 1–2 | — | 4–0 | 0–1 | 1–2 | 5–2 | 0–1 | 0–0 | 0–1 | 2–2 | 3–2 |
| Mandalskameratene | 3–3 | 1–2 | 0–3 | 1–3 | 2–2 | 2–0 | 3–0 | — | 0–3 | 3–3 | 4–3 | 2–3 | 1–1 | 2–2 | 1–2 | 1–3 |
| Molde | 4–2 | 3–2 | 0–2 | 3–1 | 1–1 | 0–2 | 4–1 | 12–1 | — | 3–0 | 1–0 | 0–2 | 0–0 | 2–1 | 1–0 | 1–0 |
| Moss | 0–1 | 4–0 | 0–0 | 2–1 | 1–1 | 1–3 | 1–0 | 3–0 | 0–0 | — | 3–1 | 2–0 | 2–0 | 2–1 | 2–1 | 1–1 |
| Notodden | 2–3 | 1–0 | 0–1 | 3–1 | 4–0 | 0–3 | 3–0 | 3–1 | 2–0 | 0–2 | — | 2–2 | 4–3 | 0–1 | 1–0 | 3–1 |
| Raufoss | 3–1 | 1–1 | 1–4 | 2–1 | 0–2 | 2–4 | 0–0 | 1–4 | 1–2 | 2–0 | 1–2 | — | 2–1 | 3–2 | 1–1 | 1–2 |
| Skeid | 1–0 | 1–2 | 0–4 | 1–1 | 0–3 | 1–3 | 1–0 | 2–2 | 0–1 | 2–2 | 1–1 | 4–1 | — | 0–2 | 1–3 | 4–0 |
| Sogndal | 2–0 | 1–2 | 3–4 | 1–2 | 4–1 | 3–0 | 0–2 | 3–2 | 2–3 | 2–0 | 1–1 | 2–1 | 2–1 | — | 1–1 | 2–1 |
| Sparta Sarpsborg | 4–1 | 3–3 | 2–4 | 0–0 | 3–0 | 2–2 | 3–1 | 6–1 | 1–2 | 1–2 | 2–5 | 1–2 | 3–1 | 2–2 | — | 0–1 |
| Tromsdalen | 0–0 | 1–1 | 3–5 | 1–0 | 1–2 | 2–2 | 1–1 | 1–1 | 1–2 | 5–1 | 2–0 | 1–1 | 2–0 | 0–1 | 0–2 | — |

Source: NIFS (in Norwegian)
Legend: Blue = home team win; Yellow = draw; Red = away team win.

== Top goalscorers ==
| Rank | Scorer | Club | Goals |
|---|---|---|---|
| 1 | (Norway) Kenneth Kvalheim | Notodden | 23 |
| 2 | (Brazil) Thiago Martins | Bodø/Glimt | 17 |
| 3 | (Nigeria) Oluwasegun Abiodun | Ham-Kam | 15 |
| 3 | (Norway) Håvard Flo | Sogndal | 15 |
| 3 | (Norway) Bjørnar Johannessen | Sparta Sarpsborg | 15 |
| 6 | (Austria) Roman Kienast | Ham-Kam | 14 |
| 6 | (Sweden) Peter Samuelsson | Kongsvinger | 14 |
| 8 | (Burkina Faso) John Pelu | Kongsvinger | 12 |
| 9 | (Denmark) Allan Borgvardt | Bryne | 11 |
| 9 | (Norway) Trond Olsen | Bodø/Glimt | 11 |
| 9 | (Norway) Kjetil Ruthford Pedersen | Mandalskameratene | 11 |
| 9 | (Bosnia and Herzegovina) Samir Šarić | Løv-Ham | 11 |

== Relegated teams ==
These two teams were relegated from the Tippeligaen in 2006:

- Ham-Kam
- Molde

== Promoted teams ==
These four teams were promoted from the 2. divisjon at the start of the season:

- Mandalskameratene
- Notodden
- Raufoss
- Skeid
