= 1972 Norwegian Second Division =

2. divisjon
- Season: 1972
- Champions: Start (Group A); Frigg (Group B); Mo (District IX–X); Stein (District XI)
- Promoted: Start (Group A); Frigg (Group B); Raufoss (Group B)
- Relegated: Sandnes Ulf (Group A); Brumunddal (Group B); Verdal (Group B)

The 1972 2. divisjon was a Norwegian second-tier football league season.

The league was contested by 35 teams, divided into a total of four groups; A and B (non-Northern Norwegian teams) and two district groups which contained teams from Northern Norway: district IX–X and district XI. The winners of group A and B were promoted to the 1973 1. divisjon, while the winners of the district groups qualified for the Northern Norwegian final. The second placed teams in group A and B met the winner of the district IX–X in a qualification round where the winner was promoted to 1. divisjon. The winner of district XI was not eligible for promotion. The bottom team in group A and B were relegated to the 3. divisjon. The two second last teams in group A and B met in a qualification round where the losing team was relegated to the 3. divisjon.

== Overview ==
=== Summary ===
Start won group A with 24 points. Frigg won group B with 29 points. Both teams promoted to the 1973 1. divisjon. Raufoss won the qualification play-offs and was also promoted.

== Tables ==
=== Group A ===
Pos	Team	Pld	W	D	L	GF	GA	GD	Pts	Promotion, qualification or relegation
1	Start (C, P)	18	10	4	4	29	23	+6	24	Promotion to First Division
2	Pors	18	11	0	7	35	16	+19	22	Qualification for the promotion play-offs
3	Østsiden	18	9	4	5	22	17	+5	22	
4	Moss	18	8	5	5	29	20	+9	21	
5	Odd	18	7	5	6	22	21	+1	19	
6	Sandefjord BK	18	6	4	8	24	25	−1	16	
7	Florvåg	18	6	4	8	31	34	−3	16	
8	Vard	18	6	4	8	23	26	−3	16	
9	Bryne (O)	18	6	2	10	21	30	−9	14	Qualification for the relegation play-offs
10	Ulf (R)	18	3	4	11	18	42	−24	10	Relegation to Third Division

Source: rsssf.no
Rules for classification: 1) points; 2) goal difference; 3) number of goals scored.
(C) Champions; (O) Play-off winners; (P) Promoted; (R) Relegated

=== Group B ===
Pos	Team	Pld	W	D	L	GF	GA	GD	Pts	Promotion, qualification or relegation
1	Frigg (C, P)	18	13	3	2	45	16	+29	29	Promotion to First Division
2	Raufoss (O, P)	18	12	2	4	41	15	+26	26	Qualification for the promotion play-offs
3	Steinkjer	18	9	6	3	28	16	+12	24	
4	Stabæk	18	8	5	5	23	13	+10	21	
5	Molde	18	9	3	6	29	23	+6	21	
6	Aalesund	18	7	4	7	16	16	0	18	
7	Clausenengen	18	5	6	7	18	27	−9	16	
8	Vålerengen	18	5	4	9	15	18	−3	14	
9	Brumunddal (R)	18	3	4	11	15	36	−21	10	Qualification for the relegation play-offs
10	Verdal (R)	18	0	1	17	6	56	−50	1	Relegation to Third Division

Source: rsssf.no
Rules for classification: 1) points; 2) goal difference; 3) number of goals scored.
(C) Champions; (O) Play-off winners; (P) Promoted; (R) Relegated

=== District IX–X ===
Pos	Team	Pld	W	D	L	GF	GA	GD	Pts	Qualification or relegation
1	Mo (C)	14	10	3	1	32	12	+20	23	Qualification for the promotion play-offs
2	Bodø/Glimt	14	4	8	2	23	10	+13	16	
3	Harstad	14	6	4	4	29	18	+11	16	
4	Mosjøen	14	5	5	4	21	15	+6	15	
5	Stålkameratene	14	6	3	5	18	13	+5	15	
6	Lyngen (R)	14	4	7	3	13	16	−3	15	Relegation to Third Division
7	Tromsø (R)	14	3	3	8	12	23	−11	9	Relegation to Third Division
8	Saltdalkameratene (R)	14	1	1	12	9	50	−41	3	Relegation to Third Division

Source: rsssf.no
Rules for classification: 1) points; 2) goal difference; 3) number of goals scored.
(C) Champions; (R) Relegated

=== District XI ===
Pos	Team	Pld	W	D	L	GF	GA	GD	Pts	Relegation
1	Stein (C)	12	9	1	2	33	10	+23	19	
2	Norild	12	7	3	2	17	7	+10	17	
3	Vadsø Turn	12	4	5	3	16	13	+3	13	
4	Kirkenes	12	5	2	5	25	20	+5	12	
5	Polarstjernen	12	2	5	5	10	20	−10	9	
6	Rafsbotn	12	4	1	7	17	32	−15	9	
7	Sandnes (R)	12	2	1	9	14	30	−16	5	Relegation to Third Division

Source: rsssf.no
Rules for classification: 1) points; 2) goal difference; 3) number of goals scored.
(C) Champions; (R) Relegated

== Promotion play-offs ==
=== Results ===
- Mo – Raufoss Fotball 0–4
- Pors – Mo 2–2
- Raufoss Fotball – Pors 2–2

Raufoss won the qualification round and won promotion to the 1. divisjon.

=== Play-off table ===
Pos	Team	Pld	W	D	L	GF	GA	GD	Pts	Promotion
1	Raufoss (O, P)	2	1	1	0	6	2	+4	3	Promotion to First Division
2	Pors	2	0	2	0	4	4	0	2	
3	Mo	2	0	1	1	2	6	−4	1	

Source: rsssf.no
Rules for classification: 1) points; 2) goal difference; 3) number of goals scored.
(O) Play-off winners; (P) Promoted

== Relegation play-offs ==
=== Results ===
- Brumunddal – Bryne 3–2
- Bryne – Brumunddal 2–1

4–4 on aggregate.

==== Replay ====
- Bryne – Brumunddal 4–0

Bryne won the qualification round and remained in the 2. divisjon. Brummunddal was relegated to the 3. divisjon.

== Northern Norwegian Final ==
A Northern Norwegian Final was played between the winners of the two district groups, Mo and Stein.

- Mo – Stein 6–1
