= Stein Karlsen =

Norwegian footballer (born 1948)

Personal information
- Date of birth: 1 September 1948 (age 78)
- Position: Striker

Senior career*
Years	Team	Apps	(Gls)
1970–1976	Hamkam		

International career
1973	Norway	1	(0)
- * Club domestic league appearances and goals

Stein Karlsen (born 1 September 1948) is a retired Norwegian football striker. Born in Hamar, he spent his career in Hamkam, and became league top goalscorer in 1973. Karlsen represented Norway as a senior international in the 1973 season.
