= 1968 Norwegian Second Division =

2. divisjon
- Season: 1968
- Champions: Start (Group A); Hødd (Group B)
- Promoted: Start; Hødd
- Relegated: Odd; Vard; Steinkjer; Gjøvik-Lyn
- Cup Winners' Cup: Mjøndalen

The 1968 2. divisjon was a Norwegian second-tier football league season.

The league was contested by 16 teams, divided into two groups; A and B. The winners of group A and B were promoted to the 1969 1. divisjon. The two lowest placed teams in both groups were relegated to the 3. divisjon.

== Overview ==
=== Summary ===
Start won group A with 24 points. Hødd won group B with 19 points. Both teams were promoted to the 1969 1. divisjon.

== Tables ==
=== Group A ===
| Pos | Team | Pld | W | D | L | GF | GA | GD | Pts | Promotion, qualification or relegation |
|---|---|---|---|---|---|---|---|---|---|---|
| 1 | Start (C, P) | 14 | 11 | 2 | 1 | 36 | 18 | +18 | 24 | Promotion to First Division |
| 2 | Bryne | 14 | 9 | 1 | 4 | 37 | 25 | +12 | 19 | |
| 3 | Pors | 14 | 5 | 5 | 4 | 21 | 19 | +2 | 15 | |
| 4 | Vigør | 14 | 5 | 2 | 7 | 19 | 23 | −4 | 12 | |
| 5 | Eik | 14 | 4 | 4 | 6 | 15 | 19 | −4 | 12 | |
| 6 | Ørn | 14 | 4 | 3 | 7 | 26 | 29 | −3 | 11 | |
| 7 | Odd (R) | 14 | 4 | 3 | 7 | 22 | 25 | −3 | 11 | Relegation to Third Division |
| 8 | Vard (R) | 14 | 3 | 2 | 9 | 24 | 42 | −18 | 8 | Relegation to Third Division |

Source: rsssf.no
Rules for classification: 1) points; 2) goal difference; 3) number of goals scored.
(C) Champions; (P) Promoted; (R) Relegated

=== Group B ===
| Pos | Team | Pld | W | D | L | GF | GA | GD | Pts | Promotion, qualification or relegation |
|---|---|---|---|---|---|---|---|---|---|---|
| 1 | Hødd (C, P) | 14 | 7 | 5 | 2 | 22 | 12 | +10 | 19 | Promotion to First Division |
| 2 | Aalesund | 14 | 8 | 2 | 4 | 27 | 15 | +12 | 18 | |
| 3 | Hamarkameratene | 14 | 8 | 2 | 4 | 23 | 17 | +6 | 18 | |
| 4 | Mjøndalen | 14 | 6 | 4 | 4 | 32 | 18 | +14 | 16 | Qualification for the Cup Winners' Cup first round (Note: As Lyn qualified for the European Cup, their European Cup Winners' Cup place as Norwegian Cup winners defaulted to Mjøndalen, the runners-up.) |
| 5 | Raufoss | 14 | 4 | 5 | 5 | 20 | 20 | 0 | 13 | |
| 6 | Aurskog | 14 | 4 | 3 | 7 | 17 | 21 | −4 | 11 | |
| 7 | Steinkjer (R) | 14 | 3 | 3 | 8 | 18 | 38 | −20 | 9 | Relegation to Third Division |
| 8 | Gjøvik-Lyn (R) | 14 | 1 | 6 | 7 | 20 | 38 | −18 | 8 | Relegation to Third Division |

Source: rsssf.no
Rules for classification: 1) points; 2) goal difference; 3) number of goals scored.
(C) Champions; (P) Promoted; (R) Relegated
