= 1967 Norwegian Second Division =

2. divisjon
- Season: 1967
- Champions: Viking (Group A); Brann (Group B)
- Promoted: Viking; Brann
- Relegated: Lisleby; Snøgg; Nidelv; Kvik

The 1967 2. divisjon was a Norwegian second-tier football league season.

The league was contested by 16 teams, divided into two groups; A and B. The winners of group A and B were promoted to the 1968 1. divisjon. The two lowest placed teams in both groups were relegated to the 3. divisjon.

== Overview ==
=== Summary ===
Viking won group A with 22 points. Brann won group B with 20 points. Both teams were promoted to the 1968 1. divisjon.

== Tables ==
=== Group A ===
Pos	Team	Pld	W	D	L	GF	GA	GD	Pts	Promotion, qualification or relegation
1	Viking (C, P)	14	11	0	3	56	18	+38	22	Promotion to First Division
2	Start	14	9	2	3	39	24	+15	20	
3	Ørn-Horten	14	7	1	6	26	25	+1	15	
4	Bryne	14	5	4	5	31	31	0	14	
5	Eik	14	4	6	4	29	32	−3	14	
6	Vigør	14	4	4	6	25	27	−2	12	
7	Lisleby (R)	14	4	2	8	16	32	−16	10	Relegation to Third Division
8	Snøgg (R)	14	1	3	10	19	52	−33	5	Relegation to Third Division

Source: rsssf.no
Rules for classification: 1) points; 2) goal difference; 3) number of goals scored.
(C) Champions; (P) Promoted; (R) Relegated

=== Group B ===
Pos	Team	Pld	W	D	L	GF	GA	GD	Pts	Promotion, qualification or relegation
1	Brann (C, P)	14	9	2	3	39	18	+21	20	Promotion to First Division
2	Mjøndalen	14	8	1	5	25	20	+5	17	
3	Hødd	14	6	4	4	37	29	+8	16	
4	Aurskog	14	7	2	5	31	24	+7	16	
5	Gjøvik-Lyn	14	7	2	5	26	25	+1	16	
6	Raufoss	14	6	1	7	18	27	−9	13	
7	Nidelv (R)	14	2	4	8	14	33	−19	8	Relegation to Third Division
8	Kvik (R)	14	3	0	11	19	33	−14	6	Relegation to Third Division

Source: rsssf.no
Rules for classification: 1) points; 2) goal difference; 3) number of goals scored.
(C) Champions; (P) Promoted; (R) Relegated
