= Odd Iversen =

Norwegian footballer (1945–2014)

Personal information
- Full name: Odd Helge Iversen
- Date of birth: 6 November 1945
- Place of birth: Trondheim, Norway
- Date of death: 29 December 2014 (aged 69)
- Place of death: Trondheim, Norway
- Position: Striker

Youth career
- 1964: Trond

Senior career*
Years	Team	Apps	(Gls)
1964–1965	Rosenborg 2	13	(13)
1965–1969	Rosenborg	54	(73)
1969–1972	Racing Mechelen	44	(27)
1973–1975	Rosenborg	42	(29)
1976–1979	Vålerenga	65	(35)
1980–1982	Rosenborg	64	(21)
Total		282	(198)

International career
1966	Norway U21	5	(4)
1967–1979	Norway	45	(19)
- * Club domestic league appearances and goals

Odd "Ivers" Iversen (6 November 1945 – 29 December 2014) was a Norwegian footballer who played as a striker; he is notable for his former record of 158 goals in Norwegian top tier football, as well as his still-standing record of 30 goals in a single season.

== Career ==
Iversen began his career in Rosenborg in 1964, and would spend twelve of his eighteen years as a top tier footballer in the club. He is often regarded as one of the greatest Norwegian footballers ever, and was the top goalscorer four times in the Norwegian top division (1967, 1968, 1969 and 1979). Upon retirement in 1982, he became the first Norwegian player in history to get a testimonial match by his club (Rosenborg).

At the time of his death he still held the record of most goals scored in one season (30 goals in 18 matches), a record that as of November 2020 still stands. During his career as a footballer he scored 158 goals in the top division, a record that stood for more than 20 years until it was broken by Petter Belsvik (159) in 2003. Since then, Harald Martin Brattbakk (166) and Sigurd Rushfeldt (172) have also passed Iversen in the all-time goalscoring chart.

In addition to Rosenborg, Iversen also played for Vålerenga and Racing Mechelen in Belgium. He also got 45 caps and 19 goals for the Norway national team.

== Personal life and death ==
Odd Iversen was born and grew up in Trondheim in the working class neighborhood of Møllenberg. He is the father of former professional footballer Steffen Iversen. He died in Trondheim in the early hours of 29 December 2014 from an unspecified illness, aged 69.

== Honours ==
Rosenborg

- Norwegian top division: 1967, 1969

Individual

- Norwegian top division top scorer: 1967, 1968, 1969, 1979
