= 1973 Norwegian First Division =

29th season of top-tier football league in Norway

1. divisjon
- Season: 1973
- Dates: 1 May – 14 October
- Champions: Viking; 3rd title
- Relegated: Frigg; Lyn; Fredrikstad
- European Cup: Viking
- Cup Winners' Cup: Strømsgodset
- UEFA Cup: Rosenborg; Start
- Matches played: 132
- Goals scored: 306 (2.32 per match)
- Top goalscorer: Stein Karlsen (17 goals)
- Biggest home win: Rosenborg 5–0 Brann (30 July 1973)
- Biggest away win: Mjøndalen 0–3 Strømsgodset (1 May 1973); Start 0–3 Viking (23 May 1973); Fredrikstad 1–4 Brann (11 June 1973); Raufoss 1–4 Frigg (29 July 1973); HamKam 0–3 Viking (5 August 1973); Skeid 0–3 Raufoss (13 August 1973)
- Highest scoring: Brann 5–2 Lyn (23 May 1973)
- Longest winning run: Viking (6 games)
- Longest unbeaten run: Viking (15 games)
- Longest winless run: Fredrikstad; HamKam (7 games)
- Longest losing run: HamKam (7 games)
- Highest attendance: 16,450; Viking 1–1 Rosenborg (25 June 1973)
- Lowest attendance: 829; Lyn 3–0 Fredrikstad (7 October 1973)
- Average attendance: 5,590 ▼0.8%

The 1973 1. divisjon was the 29th completed season of top division football in Norway.

== Overview ==
It was contested by 12 teams, and Viking FK won the championship, their second consecutive league title and their third top-flight title overall.

Fredrikstad, who was the only remaining team to have played all 28 completed seasons in the top division, was relegated in the end of the season.

== Teams and locations ==
Note: Table lists in alphabetical order.

Team	Ap.	Location	Stadium
Brann	21	Bergen	Brann Stadion
Fredrikstad	28	Fredrikstad	Fredrikstad Stadion
Frigg	15	Oslo	
HamKam	5	Hamar	Briskeby
Lyn	20	Oslo	Ullevaal Stadion
Mjøndalen	7	Mjøndalen	Nedre Eiker Stadion
Raufoss	8	Raufoss	Raufoss Stadion
Rosenborg	11	Trondheim	Lerkendal Stadion
Skeid	26	Oslo	
Start	6	Kristiansand	Kristiansand Stadion
Strømsgodset	8	Drammen	Marienlyst Stadion
Viking	26	Stavanger	Stavanger Stadion

== League table ==
Pos	Team	Pld	W	D	L	GF	GA	GD	Pts	Qualification or relegation
1	Viking (C)	22	13	6	3	30	13	+17	32	Qualification for the European Cup first round
2	Rosenborg	22	10	7	5	32	18	+14	27	Qualification for the UEFA Cup first round
3	Start	22	10	6	6	28	22	+6	26	Qualification for the UEFA Cup first round
4	HamKam	22	9	7	6	29	25	+4	25	
5	Brann	22	9	5	8	31	27	+4	23	
6	Strømsgodset	22	9	4	9	30	27	+3	22	Qualification for the Cup Winners' Cup first round
7	Skeid	22	8	6	8	20	21	−1	22	
8	Raufoss	22	7	7	8	21	26	−5	21	
9	Mjøndalen	22	7	7	8	21	26	−5	21	
10	Frigg (R)	22	5	8	9	21	27	−6	18	Relegation to Second Division
11	Lyn (R)	22	5	6	11	23	31	−8	16	Relegation to Second Division
12	Fredrikstad (R)	22	3	5	14	20	43	−23	11	Relegation to Second Division

Source: NIFS
Rules for classification: 1) points; 2) goal difference; 3) number of goals scored.
(C) Champions; (R) Relegated

== Results ==
Home \ Away	BRA	FRE	FRI	HAM	LYN	MIF	RAU	ROS	SKE	IKS	STM	VIK
Brann	—	5–0	0–1	0–0	5–2	3–0	0–1	0–1	1–1	2–1	1–0	1–0
Fredrikstad	1–4	—	0–1	2–1	0–2	0–0	1–2	2–2	1–3	1–1	4–1	0–2
Frigg	0–2	1–2	—	0–2	2–1	2–2	1–2	0–0	2–0	1–1	0–0	1–1
HamKam	3–3	1–1	1–1	—	1–1	2–0	2–0	2–1	0–1	2–1	2–0	0–3
Lyn	0–1	3–0	1–1	0–2	—	0–1	2–0	1–1	0–0	1–0	1–3	0–1
Mjøndalen	1–1	2–1	4–1	2–2	3–1	—	1–0	2–1	1–2	0–1	0–3	0–1
Raufoss	1–1	1–1	1–4	0–2	2–2	0–0	—	0–2	2–2	0–2	2–0	0–0
Rosenborg	5–0	1–0	1–0	2–0	1–1	0–1	2–0	—	3–0	1–1	3–2	2–0
Skeid	3–0	1–0	1–0	0–1	1–2	0–0	0–3	0–0	—	2–0	0–1	0–1
Start	1–0	3–1	2–0	2–2	2–1	0–0	0–1	3–1	1–0	—	1–1	0–3
Strømsgodset	1–0	5–2	1–1	3–0	2–0	3–1	0–2	2–1	1–2	1–3	—	0–1
Viking	4–1	1–0	2–1	2–1	2–1	2–0	1–1	1–1	1–1	1–2	0–0	—

Source: nifs.no (in Norwegian)
Legend: Blue = home team win; Yellow = draw; Red = away team win.

== Season statistics ==
=== Top scorer ===
- (Norway) Stein Karlsen, HamKam – 17 goals

=== Attendances ===
Pos	Team	Total	High	Low	Average	Change
1	Viking	127,283	16,450	6,800	11,571	+3.1%
2	Brann	96,865	15,198	4,467	8,806	+1.6%
3	Rosenborg	94,470	11,524	5,400	8,579	+26.0%
4	Strømsgodset	87,235	12,500	4,600	7,930	+4.2%
5	Start	73,052	10,658	4,611	6,641	n/a^{2}
6	Skeid	42,270	6,454	1,324	3,843	−22.5%
7	HamKam	41,747	6,438	2,128	3,795	−3.6%
8	Fredrikstad	39,011	6,212	1,000	3,546	−36.9%
9	Lyn	36,269	6,324	829	3,297	−22.6%
10	Mjøndalen	35,683	5,963	1,500	3,244	−28.6%
11	Frigg	33,146	7,468	1,929	3,013	n/a^{2}
12	Raufoss	30,932	6,000	1,400	2,812	n/a^{2}
	League total	737,863	16,450	829	5,590	−0.8%

Source: nifs.no
Notes:
2: Team played last season in 2. divisjon.
