= 1969 Norwegian First Division =

25th season of top-tier football league in Norway

1. divisjon
- Season: 1969
- Dates: 27 April – 19 October
- Champions: Rosenborg; 2nd title
- Relegated: Start; Lyn
- European Cup: Rosenborg
- Cup Winners' Cup: Strømsgodset
- Inter-Cities Fairs Cup: Sarpsborg FK
- Matches played: 90
- Goals scored: 252 (2.8 per match)
- Top goalscorer: Odd Iversen (26 goals)
- Biggest home win: Rosenborg 5–0 Brann (4 May 1969); Fredrikstad 5–0 Hødd (10 August 1969)
- Biggest away win: Lyn 1–8 Strømsgodset (16 May 1969)
- Highest scoring: Lyn 1–8 Strømsgodset (16 May 1969)
- Longest winning run: Skeid (5 games)
- Longest unbeaten run: Rosenborg (8 games)
- Longest winless run: Hødd (10 games)
- Longest losing run: Hødd; Lyn (5 games)
- Highest attendance: 24,350; Skeid 2–0 Rosenborg (18 August 1969)
- Lowest attendance: 2,000; Hødd 0–0 Sarpsborg FK (22 June 1969)
- Average attendance: 7,590 ▼2.4%

The 1969 1. divisjon was the 25th completed season of top division football in Norway.

== Overview ==
It was contested by 10 teams, and Rosenborg BK won the championship, their second league title.

== Teams and locations ==
Note: Table lists in alphabetical order.

Team	Ap.	Location
Brann	17	Bergen
Fredrikstad	24	Fredrikstad
Hødd	2	Ulsteinvik
Lyn	17	Oslo
Rosenborg	7	Trondheim
Sarpsborg FK	19	Sarpsborg
Skeid	23	Oslo
Start	5	Kristiansand
Strømsgodset	4	Drammen
Viking	22	Stavanger

== League table ==
Pos	Team	Pld	W	D	L	GF	GA	GD	Pts	Qualification or relegation
1	Rosenborg (C)	18	13	1	4	36	15	+21	27	Qualification for the European Cup first round
2	Fredrikstad	18	8	6	4	28	15	+13	22	
3	Strømsgodset	18	8	6	4	34	22	+12	22	Qualification for the Cup Winners' Cup first round
4	Skeid	18	9	2	7	29	22	+7	20	
5	Viking	18	6	6	6	18	17	+1	18	
6	Brann	18	6	6	6	20	26	−6	18	
7	Sarpsborg FK	18	6	5	7	22	22	0	17	Qualification for the Inter-Cities Fairs Cup first round
8	Hødd	18	4	4	10	24	39	−15	12	
9	Start (R)	18	5	2	11	20	35	−15	12	Relegation to Second Division
10	Lyn (R)	18	4	4	10	21	39	−18	12	Relegation to Second Division

Source: NIFS
Rules for classification: 1) points; 2) goal difference; 3) number of goals scored.
(C) Champions; (R) Relegated

== Results ==
Home \ Away	BRA	FRE	HØD	LYN	ROS	SRP	SKE	STA	STM	VIK
Brann	—	1–1	2–2	2–1	0–1	2–0	2–2	2–1	2–1	1–0
Fredrikstad	1–0	—	5–0	2–0	4–2	0–1	1–3	3–1	1–1	1–1
Hødd	0–1	1–3	—	2–2	1–2	0–0	3–3	5–1	1–0	1–2
Lyn	1–1	0–4	5–1	—	1–2	3–1	1–3	0–2	1–8	1–0
Rosenborg	5–0	2–0	2–1	3–0	—	2–0	4–0	2–0	3–1	0–1
Sarpsborg	5–2	1–0	1–3	2–2	0–1	—	0–2	3–0	2–0	0–0
Skeid	1–0	0–1	4–0	0–2	2–0	2–0	—	2–1	0–1	0–1
Start	1–1	1–1	3–0	2–0	1–4	0–3	2–1	—	3–4	1–0
Strømsgodset	2–0	0–0	2–1	1–1	0–0	2–2	2–1	3–0	—	3–1
Viking	0–0	0–0	1–2	3–0	3–1	1–1	1–3	1–0	2–2	—

Source: nifs.no (in Norwegian)
Legend: Blue = home team win; Yellow = draw; Red = away team win.

== Season statistics ==
=== Top scorer ===
- (Norway) Odd Iversen, Rosenborg – 26 goals

=== Attendances ===
Pos	Team	Total	High	Low	Average	Change
1	Rosenborg	125,536	21,000	8,750	13,948	+18.7%
2	Skeid	84,148	24,350	4,383	9,350	+4.5%
3	Strømsgodset	81,348	16,678	6,000	9,039	−1.3%
4	Brann	71,750	10,000	5,100	7,972	−19.2%
5	Lyn	71,375	13,300	3,907	7,931	−2.0%
6	Viking	70,600	10,100	6,500	7,844	−13.5%
7	Start	58,105	9,700	2,817	6,456	n/a^{2}
8	Fredrikstad	54,500	11,000	3,800	6,056	+15.9%
9	Sarpsborg FK	34,958	7,900	2,228	3,884	+19.7%
10	Hødd	30,800	5,500	2,000	3,422	n/a^{2}
	League total	683,120	24,350	2,000	7,590	−2.4%

Source: nifs.no
Notes:
2: Team played last season in 2. divisjon.
