= 1967 Norwegian First Division =

23rd season of top-tier football league in Norway

1. divisjon
- Season: 1967
- Dates: 27 April – 22 October
- Champions: Rosenborg; 1st title
- Relegated: Steinkjer; Odd
- European Cup: Rosenborg
- Cup Winners' Cup: Lyn
- Inter-Cities Fairs Cup: Skeid
- Matches played: 90
- Goals scored: 284 (3.16 per match)
- Top goalscorer: Odd Iversen (17 goals)
- Biggest home win: Rosenborg 6–0 Odd (18 June 1967)
- Biggest away win: Steinkjer 2–8 Lyn (20 August 1967)
- Highest scoring: Steinkjer 2–8 Lyn (20 August 1967)
- Longest winning run: Skeid (4 games)
- Longest unbeaten run: Rosenborg (9 games)
- Longest winless run: Sarpsborg FK (7 games)
- Longest losing run: Strømsgodset (5 games)
- Highest attendance: 14,981; Rosenborg 0–0 Frigg (10 May 1967)
- Lowest attendance: 1,660; Vålerengen 1–2 Frigg (20 October 1967)
- Average attendance: 6,250 ▲36.1%

The 1967 1. divisjon was the 23rd completed season of top division football in Norway.

== Overview ==
It was contested by 10 teams, and Rosenborg BK won the championship, their first league title.

== Teams and locations ==
Note: Table lists in alphabetical order.

Team	Ap.	Location
Fredrikstad	22	Fredrikstad
Frigg	12	Oslo
Lyn	15	Oslo
Odd	18	Skien
Rosenborg	5	Trondheim
Sarpsborg FK	17	Sarpsborg
Skeid	21	Oslo
Steinkjer	9	Steinkjer
Strømsgodset	2	Drammen
Vålerengen	18	Oslo

== League table ==
Pos	Team	Pld	W	D	L	GF	GA	GD	Pts	Qualification or relegation
1	Rosenborg (C)	18	9	7	2	40	24	+16	25	Qualification for the European Cup first round
2	Skeid	18	10	2	6	42	26	+16	22	Qualification for the Inter-Cities Fairs Cup first round
3	Lyn	18	9	3	6	39	30	+9	21	Qualification for the Cup Winners' Cup first round
4	Frigg	18	8	4	6	22	22	0	20	
5	Vålerengen	18	7	4	7	27	33	−6	18	
6	Fredrikstad	18	7	2	9	27	25	+2	16	
7	Sarpsborg FK	18	5	6	7	18	24	−6	16	
8	Strømsgodset	18	7	1	10	30	34	−4	15	
9	Steinkjer (R)	18	5	5	8	21	31	−10	15	Relegation to Second Division
10	Odd (R)	18	5	2	11	18	35	−17	12	Relegation to Second Division

Source: NIFS
Rules for classification: 1) points; 2) goal difference; 3) number of goals scored.
(C) Champions; (R) Relegated

== Results ==
Home \ Away	FRE	FRI	LYN	ODD	ROS	SRP	SKE	STE	STM	VÅL
Fredrikstad	—	1–2	1–1	2–1	2–2	0–2	2–1	0–1	4–0	2–3
Frigg	2–1	—	1–3	1–1	2–2	2–0	0–1	3–3	1–0	3–1
Lyn	3–2	1–0	—	1–2	4–0	2–1	5–3	0–0	3–2	1–2
Odd	0–1	0–1	0–2	—	1–1	0–1	2–1	2–0	3–1	2–3
Rosenborg	2–1	0–0	2–0	6–0	—	2–2	4–3	2–1	3–1	4–0
Sarpsborg	0–3	1–2	0–0	3–0	1–0	—	1–1	1–0	0–0	1–1
Skeid	1–0	4–0	4–2	3–1	2–5	4–0	—	1–0	4–0	4–1
Steinkjer	2–0	1–0	2–8	1–2	1–1	2–2	0–4	—	2–0	1–1
Strømsgodset	2–3	1–0	4–1	4–1	0–1	4–2	3–1	4–2	—	4–1
Vålerengen	0–2	1–2	4–2	3–0	3–3	1–0	0–0	0–2	2–0	—

Source: nifs.no (in Norwegian)
Legend: Blue = home team win; Yellow = draw; Red = away team win.

== Season statistics ==
=== Top scorer ===
- (Norway) Odd Iversen, Rosenborg – 17 goals

=== Attendances ===
Pos	Team	Total	High	Low	Average	Change
1	Rosenborg	100,135	14,981	8,000	11,126	n/a^{2}
2	Skeid	79,339	12,444	4,468	8,815	+20.0%
3	Vålerengen	69,663	13,841	1,660	7,740	+32.0%
4	Strømsgodset	61,701	12,201	4,500	6,856	n/a^{2}
5	Frigg	54,586	12,083	1,865	6,065	+12.2%
6	Lyn	53,178	13,800	2,663	5,909	+9.8%
7	Sarpsborg FK	40,601	8,717	2,050	4,511	+100.5%
8	Steinkjer	37,300	8,000	2,500	4,144	+22.3%
9	Fredrikstad	36,283	7,200	2,300	4,031	−12.6%
10	Odd	29,686	4,000	2,986	3,298	−9.9%
	League total	562,472	14,981	1,660	6,250	+36.1%

Source: nifs.no
Notes:
2: Team played last season in 2. divisjon.
