= 1968 Norwegian First Division =

24th season of top-tier football league in Norway

1. divisjon
- Season: 1968
- Dates: 25 April – 20 October
- Champions: Lyn; 2nd title
- Relegated: Frigg; Vålerengen
- European Cup: Lyn
- Cup Winners' Cup: Mjøndalen
- Inter-Cities Fairs Cup: Rosenborg; Skeid
- Matches played: 90
- Goals scored: 320 (3.56 per match)
- Top goalscorer: Odd Iversen (30 goals)
- Biggest home win: Strømsgodset 10–1 Lyn (16 June 1968); Lyn 11–2 Viking (28 July 1968)
- Biggest away win: Skeid 0–6 Fredrikstad (23 September 1968)
- Highest scoring: Lyn 11–2 Viking (28 July 1968)
- Longest winning run: Lyn (8 games)
- Longest unbeaten run: Lyn; Rosenborg (8 games)
- Longest winless run: Vålerengen (8 games)
- Longest losing run: Vålerengen (6 games)
- Highest attendance: 21,624; Rosenborg 2–4 Lyn (11 August 1968)
- Lowest attendance: 834; Frigg 0–2 Skeid (20 October 1968)
- Average attendance: 7,778 ▲24.4%

The 1968 1. divisjon was the 24th completed season of top division football in Norway.

== Overview ==
It was contested by 10 teams, and Lyn from Oslo won the championship, their second title. Lyn's 28 points was at the time a record for most points in a season, one more than Vålerengen achieved in the 1965 season. Frigg and Vålerengen were relegated to the 1969 2. divisjon.

Odd Iversen of Rosenborg scored 30 goals this season, which as of the start of the 2019 season is still a league record. On 20 October, Iversen scored six goals in Rosenborg's 7–2 win against Vålerengen. That is still a joint league record for most goals scored in one game, an achievement Jan Fuglset copied in 1976.

== Teams and locations ==
Note: Table lists in alphabetical order.

Team	Ap.	Location
Brann	16	Bergen
Fredrikstad	23	Fredrikstad
Frigg	13	Oslo
Lyn	16	Oslo
Rosenborg	6	Trondheim
Sarpsborg FK	18	Sarpsborg
Skeid	22	Oslo
Strømsgodset	3	Drammen
Vålerengen	19	Oslo
Viking	21	Stavanger

== League table ==
Pos	Team	Pld	W	D	L	GF	GA	GD	Pts	Qualification or relegation
1	Lyn (C)	18	14	0	4	57	33	+24	28	Qualification for the European Cup first round
2	Rosenborg	18	11	2	5	53	29	+24	24	Qualification for the Inter-Cities Fairs Cup first round
3	Viking	18	9	3	6	34	32	+2	21	
4	Strømsgodset	18	9	1	8	48	27	+21	19	
5	Brann	18	8	3	7	31	32	−1	19	
6	Skeid	18	9	1	8	22	33	−11	19	Qualification for the Inter-Cities Fairs Cup first round
7	Sarpsborg FK	18	5	5	8	14	25	−11	15	
8	Fredrikstad	18	6	2	10	28	34	−6	14	
9	Frigg (R)	18	3	5	10	15	37	−22	11	Relegation to Second Division
10	Vålerengen (R)	18	3	4	11	18	38	−20	10	Relegation to Second Division

Source: NIFS
Rules for classification: 1) points; 2) goal difference; 3) number of goals scored.
(C) Champions; (R) Relegated

== Results ==
Home \ Away	BRA	FRE	FRI	LYN	ROS	SRP	SKE	STM	VIK	VÅL
Brann	—	2–3	2–2	0–2	0–4	2–0	2–0	2–1	2–2	2–0
Fredrikstad	1–3	—	1–1	1–4	0–1	4–1	0–2	0–3	2–1	1–0
Frigg	0–4	0–1	—	2–5	2–1	1–0	0–2	4–1	0–0	1–2
Lyn	1–4	3–1	5–0	—	3–1	2–0	2–1	1–6	11–2	2–0
Rosenborg	7–1	2–1	0–0	2–4	—	1–1	6–0	3–2	1–2	7–2
Sarpsborg	1–2	3–2	0–0	0–4	2–5	—	1–1	2–0	0–0	0–0
Skeid	2–0	0–6	2–1	0–3	0–2	1–0	—	2–4	2–1	3–0
Strømsgodset	2–0	2–1	3–1	10–1	3–0	0–1	1–2	—	2–3	1–1
Viking	2–1	3–0	6–0	2–1	2–5	0–1	3–0	2–1	—	0–2
Vålerengen	2–2	1–1	2–0	1–3	2–3	0–1	1–2	1–6	1–3	—

Source: nifs.no (in Norwegian)
Legend: Blue = home team win; Yellow = draw; Red = away team win.

== Season statistics ==
=== Top scorer ===
- (Norway) Odd Iversen, Rosenborg – 30 goals

=== Attendances ===
Pos	Team	Total	High	Low	Average	Change
1	Rosenborg	105,769	21,624	3,275	11,752	+5.6%
2	Brann	88,800	15,600	7,000	9,867	n/a^{2}
3	Strømsgodset	82,424	12,500	7,300	9,158	+33.6%
4	Viking	81,638	13,600	2,900	9,071	n/a^{2}
5	Skeid	80,557	12,451	3,904	8,951	+1.5%
6	Lyn	72,805	17,709	4,549	8,089	+36.9%
7	Vålerengen	62,109	13,100	2,111	6,901	−10.8%
8	Frigg	49,687	10,831	834	5,521	−9.0%
9	Fredrikstad	47,010	8,340	2,028	5,223	+29.6%
10	Sarpsborg FK	29,214	5,600	995	3,246	−28.0%
	League total	700,013	21,624	834	7,778	+24.4%

Source: nifs.no
Notes:
2: Team played last season in 2. divisjon.
