= 1964 in Norwegian football =

Football in Norway
- Season: 1964

Men's football
- 1. divisjon: Lyn
- 2. divisjon: Odd (Group A); Steinkjer (Group B)
- NM: Rosenborg

The 1964 season was the 59th season of competitive football in Norway.

== 1. divisjon ==
Lyn Fotball won their first league title in 1964.

Pos	Team	Pld	W	D	L	GF	GA	GD	Pts	Qualification or relegation
1	Lyn (C)	18	10	6	2	39	16	+23	26	Qualification for the first round of the 1964–65 European Cup and the 1965–66 European Cup
2	Fredrikstad	18	9	6	3	40	21	+19	24	
3	Sarpsborg FK	18	10	3	5	30	16	+14	23	
4	Frigg	18	6	8	4	28	29	−1	20	
5	Skeid	18	5	7	6	24	22	+2	17	
6	Vålerengen	18	6	5	7	18	21	−3	17	Qualification for the Inter-Cities Fairs Cup
7	Sandefjord BK	18	6	5	7	17	23	−6	17	
8	Viking	18	5	4	9	22	37	−15	14	
9	Brann (R)	18	3	6	9	17	32	−15	12	Relegation to Second Division
10	Raufoss (R)	18	3	4	11	22	40	−18	10	Relegation to Second Division

Source: NIFS
Rules for classification: 1) points; 2) goal difference; 3) number of goals scored.
(C) Champions; (R) Relegated

== 2. divisjon ==
=== Group A ===
Pos	Team	Pld	W	D	L	GF	GA	GD	Pts	Promotion, qualification or relegation
1	Odd (C, P)	14	8	4	2	28	17	+11	20	Promotion to First Division
2	Gjøvik-Lyn	14	8	3	3	35	11	+24	19	
3	Eik	14	8	2	4	25	24	+1	18	
4	Start	14	6	3	5	26	24	+2	15	
5	Årstad	14	4	5	5	19	26	−7	13	
6	Ørn	14	6	0	8	28	24	+4	12	
7	Fram Larvik (R)	14	4	2	8	18	33	−15	10	Relegation to Third Division
8	Haugar (R)	14	0	5	9	12	32	−20	5	Relegation to Third Division

Source: rsssf.no
Rules for classification: 1) points; 2) goal difference; 3) number of goals scored.
(C) Champions; (P) Promoted; (R) Relegated

=== Group B ===
Pos	Team	Pld	W	D	L	GF	GA	GD	Pts	Promotion, qualification or relegation
1	Steinkjer (C, P)	14	10	1	3	35	14	+21	21	Promotion to First Division
2	Nidelv	14	8	1	5	24	17	+7	17	
3	Rosenborg	14	6	3	5	22	19	+3	15	Qualification for the Cup Winners' Cup first round (Note: Rosenborg qualified for the European Cup Winners' Cup as Norwegian Cup winners.)
4	Østsiden	14	5	4	5	25	23	+2	14	
5	Lillestrøm	14	6	2	6	25	25	0	14	
6	Kvik	14	5	4	5	20	25	−5	14	
7	Strømmen (R)	14	5	3	6	17	17	0	13	Relegation to Third Division
8	Greåker (R)	14	2	0	12	16	44	−28	4	Relegation to Third Division

Source: rsssf.no
Rules for classification: 1) points; 2) goal difference; 3) number of goals scored.
(C) Champions; (P) Promoted; (R) Relegated

== 3. divisjon ==
=== Group Østland/Søndre ===
Team	Pld	W	D	L	GF	GA	GD	Pts	Promotion or relegation
Lisleby	14	9	3	2	25	13	+12	21	Promoted
Snøgg	14	8	1	5	33	24	+9	17	
Moss	14	8	1	5	27	19	+8	17	
Larvik Turn	14	6	4	4	20	17	+3	16	
Runar	14	7	1	6	28	23	+5	15	
Askim	14	4	3	7	17	21	−4	11	Relegated
Sparta	14	3	2	9	16	36	−20	8	Relegated
Hafslund	14	3	1	10	13	26	−13	7	Relegated

=== GroupØstland/Nordre ===
Team	Pld	W	D	L	GF	GA	GD	Pts	Promotion or relegation
Aurskog	14	10	0	4	48	28	+20	20	Promoted
Mjøndalen	14	8	2	4	30	32	−2	18	
Strømsgodset	14	6	3	5	37	27	+10	15	
Hamarkameratene	14	5	4	5	29	24	+5	14	
Sagene	14	6	1	7	21	29	−8	13	
Fremad	14	5	2	7	21	32	−11	12	
Asker	14	2	6	6	15	22	−7	10	Relegated
Åssiden	14	4	2	8	15	22	−7	10	Relegated

=== Group Sørland/Vestland, A ===
Team	Pld	W	D	L	GF	GA	GD	Pts	Qualification or relegation
Donn	14	10	2	2	52	18	+34	22	Play-off
Vigør	14	7	4	3	34	30	+4	18	
Jerv	14	5	5	4	41	33	+8	15	
Vindbjart	14	6	3	5	36	30	+6	15	
Grane (Arendal)	14	5	4	5	29	35	−6	14	
Flekkefjord	14	4	5	5	27	29	−2	13	
Mandalskameratene	14	4	0	10	25	40	−15	8	Relegated
Øyestad	14	3	1	10	21	50	−29	7	Relegated

=== Group Sørland/Vestland, B ===
Team	Pld	W	D	L	GF	GA	GD	Pts	Qualification or relegation
Bryne	14	10	2	2	46	17	+29	22	Play-off
Ulf	14	10	1	3	38	22	+16	21	
Vard	14	8	2	4	40	21	+19	18	
Jarl	14	8	2	4	30	25	+5	18	
Nærbø	14	3	5	6	20	25	−5	11	
Djerv 1919	14	3	2	9	20	42	−22	8	
Vidar	14	2	3	9	21	31	−10	7	Relegated
Stavanger IF	14	3	1	10	12	44	−32	7	Relegated

=== Group Sørland/Vestland, C ===
Team	Pld	W	D	L	GF	GA	GD	Pts	Qualification or relegation
Os	14	11	3	0	36	12	+24	25	Play-off
Ny-Krohnborg	14	8	3	3	26	12	+14	19	
Varegg	14	7	3	4	29	16	+13	17	
Jotun	14	7	3	4	31	27	+4	17	
Djerv	14	7	2	5	29	20	+9	16	
Arna	14	4	1	9	25	35	−10	9	
Nordnes	14	1	3	10	10	38	−28	5	Relegated
Hardy	14	1	2	11	6	28	−22	4	Relegated

=== Group Møre ===
Team	Pld	W	D	L	GF	GA	GD	Pts	Qualification
Hødd	14	11	3	0	47	13	+34	25	Play-off
Molde	14	7	4	3	28	16	+12	18	
Aalesund	14	7	4	3	26	16	+10	18	
Langevåg	14	6	5	3	27	22	+5	17	
Herd	14	6	3	5	23	22	+1	15	
Kristiansund	14	3	4	7	29	30	−1	10	
Åndalsnes	14	3	3	8	24	43	−19	9	
Braat	14	0	0	14	13	55	−42	0	

=== Group Trøndelag ===
Team	Pld	W	D	L	GF	GA	GD	Pts	Qualification or relegation
Verdal	14	10	3	1	38	13	+25	23	Play-off
Falken	14	11	1	2	30	16	+14	23	
Sverre	14	6	3	5	21	17	+4	15	
Brage	14	4	5	5	15	20	−5	13	
Nessegutten	14	4	4	6	22	25	−3	12	
Løkken	14	5	1	8	25	23	+2	11	
Freidig	14	5	1	8	16	34	−18	11	Relegated
Ranheim	14	1	2	11	19	38	−19	4	Relegated

=== District IX ===
Team	Pld	W	D	L	GF	GA	GD	Pts	Relegation
Bodø/Glimt	10	10	0	0	39	5	+34	20	
Mo	10	6	1	3	23	19	+4	13	
Stålkameratene	10	3	3	4	16	16	0	9	
Mosjøen	10	3	2	5	7	17	−10	8	
Saltdalkameratene	10	2	2	6	8	16	−8	6	
Brønnøysund	10	1	2	7	11	31	−20	4	Relegated

=== District X ===
Team	Pld	W	D	L	GF	GA	GD	Pts	Relegation
Narvik/Nor	10	6	3	1	29	13	+16	15	
Harstad	10	6	3	1	31	17	+14	15	
Tromsø	10	6	2	2	19	15	+4	14	
Mjølner	10	3	4	3	26	15	+11	10	
Bardufoss/Omegn	10	0	3	7	15	31	−16	3	
Mellembygd	10	1	1	8	13	42	−29	3	Relegated

=== District XI ===
Team	Pld	W	D	L	GF	GA	GD	Pts	Relegation
Kirkenes	10	9	0	1	37	15	+22	18	
Alta	10	6	0	4	21	20	+1	12	
Norild	10	5	1	4	24	22	+2	11	
Stein	10	5	0	5	23	22	+1	10	
Honningsvåg	10	3	1	6	16	21	−5	7	
Sørild	10	1	0	9	18	39	−21	2	Relegated

=== Play-off Sørland/Vestland ===
October 4: Os - Bryne 1-2

October 11: Donn - Os 2-2

October 18: Bryne - Donn 1-1

Team	Pld	W	D	L	GF	GA	GD	Pts	Promotion
Bryne	2	2	0	0	4	2	+2	4	Promoted
Donn	2	0	1	1	3	4	−1	1	
Os	2	0	1	1	3	4	−1	1	

=== Play-off Møre/Trøndelag ===
October 11: Verdal - Hødd 0-2

October 18: Hødd - Verdal 4-2 (agg. 6-2)

Hødd promoted

== 4. divisjon ==
=== District I ===
Team	Notes
Selbak	Play-off
Torp
Kvik (Halden)
Navestad
Borgen
Rapid
Sprint/Jeløy
Rakkestad
Tistedalen
Tune

=== District II, Group A ===
Team	Notes
Drafn	Play-off
Spartacus
Geitehus
Svelvik
Stabæk
Vestfossen
Kongsberg
Røa

=== District II, Group B ===
Team	Notes
Liv	Play-off
Slemmestad
Kjellmyra
Skiold
Drammens BK
Eidsvold Turn
Furuset
Sandaker/Aasen

=== District III, Group A (Oplandene) ===
Team	Notes
Hamar IL	Play-off
Brumunddal
Kapp
Mesna
Stange
Redalen
Gjøvik SK
Biri

=== District III, Group B1 (Sør-Østerdal) ===
Team	Notes
Nordre Trysil	Play-off
Nybergsund
Trysilgutten
Ytre Rendal
Koppang
Elverum
Innsats
Østby

=== District III, Group B2 (Nord-Østerdal) ===
Team	Notes
Brekken	Play-off
Røros
Ålen
Folldal
Nansen
Kvikne
Tynset
Tylldal

=== District III, Group B3 (Sør-Gudbrandsdal) ===
Team	Notes
Faaberg	Play-off
Kvam
Fåvang
Follebu
Østre Gausdal
Vinstra
Ringebu

=== District III, Group B4 (Nord-Gudbrandsdal) ===
Team	Notes
Dovre	Play-off
Sel
Vågå
Faukstad
Lesja
Otta

=== District IV, Group A (Vestfold) ===
Team	Notes
Tønsbergkameratene	Play-off
Holmestrand
Stag
Tønsberg Turn
Sem
Store Bergan
Falk
Flint

=== District IV, Group B (Grenland) ===
Team	Notes
Pors	Play-off
Urædd
Borg
Brevik
Storm
Skiens BK
Langesund
Skiens-Grane

=== District IV, Group B (Øvre Telemark) ===
Team	Notes
Ulefoss	Play-off
Rjukan
Gvarv
Heddal
Drangedal
Skade
Skarphedin
Kjapp

=== District V, Group A1 (Aust-Agder) ===
Team	Notes
Sørfjell	Promoted
Rygene
Arendals BK
Risør
Trauma
Tvedestrand

=== District V, Group A2 (Vest-Agder) ===
Team	Notes
Våg	Promoted
Farsund
Torridal
Lyngdal
Giv Akt
Kvinesdal

=== District V, Group B1 (Rogaland) ===
Team	Notes
Ålgård	Play-off
Klepp
Sola
Egersund
Varhaug
Brusand
Moi
Figgjo

=== District V, Group B2 (Rogaland) ===
Team	Notes
Buøy	Play-off
Randaberg
Brodd
Åkra
Nord
Hinna
Kopervik
Ganndal

=== District V, Group C (Sunnhordland) ===
Team	Notes
Odda	Play-off
Stord
Fonna
Etne
Trio
Halsnøy

=== District VI, Group A (Bergen) ===
Team	Notes
Baune	Play-off
Trane
Nymark
Sandviken
Fjellkameratene
Laksevåg
Minde

=== District VI, Group B (Midthordland) ===
Team	Notes
Fana	Play-off

=== District VI, Group C (Sogn og Fjordane) ===
Team	Notes
Sogndal	Play-off
Eid
Sandane
Måløy
Dale (Sunnfjord)
Florø
Tornado
Vik

=== District VII, Group A (Sunnmøre) ===
Team	Notes
Rollon	Play-off
Spjelkavik
Velled./Ringen
Sykkylven
Valder
Ørsta
Skarbøvik
Aksla

=== District VII, Group B (Romsdal) ===
Team	Notes
Nord-Gossen	Play-off
Træff
Fiksdal
Bryn
Eidsvåg (Romsdal)
Tresfjord
Harøy
Fræna

=== District VII, Group C (Nordmøre) ===
Team	Notes
Clausenengen	Play-off
Søya
Sunndal
Framtid
Dahle
Bøfjord
Tingvoll
Goma

=== District VIII, Group A (Sør-Trøndelag) ===
Team	Notes
Flå	Play-off
Orkanger
Rindal
Troll
Oppdal
Melhus
Dalguten
Leik

=== District VIII, Group B (Trondheim og omegn) ===
Team	Notes
Heimdal	Play-off
Trondheims/Ørn
Tryggkameratene
Strinda
Sverresborg
Strindheim
Vestbyen
Trond

=== District VIII, Group C (Fosen) ===
Team	Notes
Hasselvika	Play-off
Brekstad
Fevåg
Opphaug
Rissa
Bjugn
Ørland Flystasjon	Withdrew

=== District VIII, Group D (Nord-Trøndelag/Namdal) ===
Team	Notes
Fram (Skatval)	Play-off
Stjørdals/Blink
Namsos
Neset
Vikavarvet
Henning
Snåsa
Sprova

=== Play-off District I/IV ===
- Selbak - Tønsbergkameratene 5-1
- Ulefoss - Pors 2-4
- Pors - Selbak 4-0
- Tønsbergkameratene - Ulefoss 2-0
- Tønsbergkameratene - Pors 2-2
- Selbak - Ulefoss 9-1

Team	Pld	W	D	L	GF	GA	GD	Pts	Promotion
Pors	3	2	1	0	10	4	+6	5	Promoted
Selbak	3	2	0	1	14	6	+8	4	Promoted
Tønsbergkameratene	3	1	1	1	5	7	−2	3	
Ulefoss	3	0	0	3	3	15	−12	0	

=== Play-off District II ===
- Liv - Drafn 0-2
- Drafn - Liv 3-1 (agg. 5-1)

Drafn promoted

=== Play-off District III ===
- Brekken - Nordre Trysil 1-0
- Faaberg - Dovre 2-1
- Faaberg - Brekken 2-4
- Brekken - Hamar IL 1-7
- Hamar IL - Brekken 3-1

Hamar IL promoted

=== Play-off District V ===
- Buøy - Ålgård 2-0
- Ålgård - Buøy 1-1 (agg. 1-3)

Buøy promoted

- Ålgård - Odda 1-2 (in Haugesund)

Odda promoted

=== Championship District V ===
- Våg - Sørfjell 3-1
- Sørfjell - Våg (not played)

=== Play-off District VI ===
- Sogndal - Baune 1-0
- Baune - Fana 6-0
- Fana - Sogndal 0-1

Team	Pld	W	D	L	GF	GA	GD	Pts	Promotion
Sogndal	2	2	0	0	2	0	+2	4	Promoted
Baune	2	1	0	1	6	1	+5	2	Promoted
Fana	2	0	0	2	0	7	−7	0	

=== Play-off District VII ===
- Clausenengen - Nord-Gossen 1-2
- Nord-Gossen - Rollon 2-1
- Rollon - Clausenengen 1-1

Team	Pld	W	D	L	GF	GA	GD	Pts	Promotion
Nord-Gossen	2	2	0	0	4	2	+2	4	Promoted
Clausenengen	2	0	1	1	2	3	−1	1	
Rollon	2	0	1	1	2	3	−1	1	

- Clausenengen - Rollon 4-3 (in Molde)

Clausenengen promoted

=== Play-off District VIII ===
- Fram - Sandviken 3-3
- Flå - Heimdal 5-1
- Hasselvika - Flå 1-2
- Heimdal - Fram 2-2
- Hasselvika - Heimdal 3-0
- Fram - Flå 0-1

Team	Pld	W	D	L	GF	GA	GD	Pts	Promotion
Flå	3	3	0	0	8	2	+6	6	Promoted
Hasselvika	3	1	1	1	7	5	+2	3	Promoted
Fram (Skatval)	3	0	2	1	5	6	−1	2	
Heimdal	3	0	1	2	3	10	−7	1	

== Norwegian Cup ==
Rosenborg BK defeated Sarpsborg FK 2-1 in the cup final. It was Rosenborg's second cup win, after the 1960 cup.

=== Final ===
25 October 1964
13:15 CET (UTC+1)

Rosenborg	2–1	Sarpsborg
Kleveland 32'; Pedersen 55'	Report	Kjølholdt 85' (pen.)

Ullevaal Stadion, Oslo
Attendance: 24,665
Referee: Johan Riseth (Namsos)

== Northern Norwegian Cup ==
=== Final ===
Bodø/Glimt	4–3	Mjølner
	Report

== European Cups ==
=== Norwegian representatives ===
- Lyn (Champions Cup
- Skeid (Cup Winners Cup)
- Vålerengen (Fairs Cup)

=== First round ===
September 9: Reipas Lahti (Finland) - Lyn 2-1

October 7: Lyn - Reipas Lahti 3-0 (agg. 4-2)

=== Second round ===
November 4: DWS Amsterdam (Netherlands) - Lyn 5-0

November 18: Lyn - DWS Amsterdam 1-3 (agg. 1-8)

=== First round ===
September 15: Skeid - Haka Valkeakoski (Finland) 1-0

October 7: Haka Valkeakoski - Skeid 2-0 (agg. 2-1)

=== First round ===
September 23: Vålerengen - Everton (England) 2-5

October 14: Everton - Vålerengen 4-2 (agg. 9-4)

== National team ==
Date	Venue	Opponent	Res.*	Competition	Norwegian goalscorers
May 13	Oslo	Republic of Ireland	1–4	Friendly	Leif Eriksen
July 1	Bergen	Switzerland	3–2	Friendly	Erik Johansen, Einar Bruno Larsen, Olav Nilsen
August 20	Trondheim	Finland	2–0	Friendly	Harald Berg, Finn Seeman
September 20	Oslo	Sweden	1–1	Friendly	Finn Seeman
October 11	Copenhagen	Denmark	0–2	Friendly	
November 8	Luxembourg	Luxembourg	2–0	WCQ	Harald Berg, Erik Johansen
November 11	Paris	France	0–1	WCQ	

Note: Norway's goals first
Explanation:

- WCQ = World Cup Qualifier
