= 1965 Norwegian Second Division =

2. divisjon
- Season: 1965
- Promoted: Lisleby; Hødd
- Relegated: Østsiden; Ørn; Årstad; Kvik

The 1965 2. divisjon was a Norwegian second-tier football league season. The league was contested by 16 teams in two groups, with 8 teams in each group. The two group-winners, Lisleby and IL Hødd, won promotion to the 1966 1. divisjon, while the two bottom teams from each group, Østsiden, Ørn, Årstad and Kvik, were relegated to the third tier.

== Team changes from 1964 ==
The 1964 season saw Odd and Steinkjer win promotion to the top-flight. They were replaced by Brann and Raufoss, who were relegated after finishing ninth and tenth respectively in the 1964 1. divisjon.

Fram and Haugar from Group A, in addition to Strømmen and Greåker from Group B, were relegated to the third tier after the 1964 season. Lisleby, Aurskog, Bryne and Hødd won promotion from the third tier.

== Season summary ==
Lisleby won Group A three points ahead of Gjøvik-Lyn, and were promoted to the 1. divisjon. Østsiden and Ørn were relegated from Group A.

Brann, who won the 1963 1. divisjon, had ambitions to make the stay at the second-tier at short as possible, and were aiming for promotion despite having lost their big star, Roald "Kniksen" Jensen to Scottish club Hearts. Brann won their first three matches in Group B, and did not lose a single game in the first half of the season, until they lost against Bryne in August. Rosenborg, who won the 1964 Norwegian Cup and made their debut in European football this season, were one of Brann's challengers for promotion in Group B. When Brann missed a penalty and drew 0–0 against Årstad in the penultimate match, while Rosenborg won 2–1 against Kvik after Tor Kleveland scored the winning goal on a penalty, Verdens Gang reported that Rosenborg had secured promotion even though they were only two points ahead of Brann and Hødd, and had a 12 and 6 goals better goal-difference respectively.

Rosenborg had to travel to Bergen to meet Brann in the last match, while Hødd met Kvik at Lerkendal Stadion, Rosenborg's home ground. When Brann won 2-1 against Rosenborg, Hødd had to win with five goals to win promotion ahead of Rosenborg. Hødd won 8–2 and was promoted to the top-flight for the first time in the club's history. That Kvik lost to Hødd by such a large margin, especially when Hødd were only leading 3–2 half-way through the second half until it was announced that Brann were in the lead against Rosenborg, was not popular amongst the Rosenborg supporters in Trondheim. They claimed that Kvik lost to Hødd by six goals, only to prevent their rivals Rosenborg being promoted. Kvik finished the season with four points, and was relegated along with Årstad.

== Tables ==
=== Group A ===
Pos	Team	Pld	W	D	L	GF	GA	GD	Pts	Promotion or relegation
1	Lisleby (C, P)	14	8	3	3	20	14	+6	19	Promotion to First Division
2	Raufoss	14	7	3	4	30	22	+8	17	
3	Gjøvik-Lyn	14	6	4	4	31	19	+12	16	
4	Eik	14	6	3	5	25	21	+4	15	
5	Lillestrøm	14	6	1	7	29	29	0	13	
6	Aurskog	14	4	3	7	16	26	−10	11	
7	Østsiden (R)	14	3	5	6	16	28	−12	11	Relegation to Third Division
8	Ørn (R)	14	3	4	7	17	25	−8	10	Relegation to Third Division

Source: rsssf.no
Rules for classification: 1) points; 2) goal difference; 3) number of goals scored.
(C) Champions; (P) Promoted; (R) Relegated

=== Group B ===
Pos	Team	Pld	W	D	L	GF	GA	GD	Pts	Promotion or relegation
1	Hødd (C, P)	14	7	5	2	41	24	+17	19	Promotion to First Division
2	Rosenborg	14	8	3	3	36	20	+16	19	
3	Brann	14	7	5	2	25	19	+6	19	
4	Nidelv	14	4	7	3	24	21	+3	15	
5	Bryne	14	6	2	6	28	26	+2	14	
6	Start	14	5	2	7	23	23	0	12	
7	Årstad (R)	14	4	2	8	15	29	−14	10	Relegation to Third Division
8	Kvik (R)	14	1	2	11	16	46	−30	4	Relegation to Third Division

Source: rsssf.no
Rules for classification: 1) points; 2) goal difference; 3) number of goals scored.
(C) Champions; (P) Promoted; (R) Relegated
