= Tingstad =

Tingstad is a surname. Notable people with the surname include:

- Birger Tingstad (1939–2012), Norwegian footballer
- Eric Tingstad (born 1954), American record producer, musician, songwriter, and composer
