= Kjell Hvidsand =

Norwegian footballer (1941-2014)

Kjell Hvidsand (16 January 1941 – 14 November 2014) was a Norwegian footballer.

Hvidsand played for Rosenborg BK between 1960 and 1970. He won the Norwegian Football Cup in 1960 and 1964 and the 1969 Norwegian First Division. He also played eight games in different European competitions.
