= 1964 Norwegian Second Division =

Norwegian national second-tier football league season

2. divisjon
- Season: 1964
- Champions: Odd (Group A); Steinkjer (Group B)
- Promoted: Odd; Steinkjer
- Relegated: Fram Larvik; Haugar; Strømmen; Greåker
- Cup Winners' Cup: Rosenborg

The 1964 2. divisjon was the second Norwegian national second-tier football league season.

The league was contested by 16 teams, divided into two groups; A and B. The winners of group A and B were promoted to the 1965 1. divisjon. The two lowest placed teams in both groups were relegated to the 3. divisjon.

== Overview ==
=== Summary ===
Odd won group A with 20 points. Steinkjer won group B with 21 points. Both teams were promoted to the 1965 1. divisjon.

== Tables ==
=== Group A ===
Pos	Team	Pld	W	D	L	GF	GA	GD	Pts	Promotion, qualification or relegation
1	Odd (C, P)	14	8	4	2	28	17	+11	20	Promotion to First Division
2	Gjøvik-Lyn	14	8	3	3	35	11	+24	19	
3	Eik	14	8	2	4	25	24	+1	18	
4	Start	14	6	3	5	26	24	+2	15	
5	Årstad	14	4	5	5	19	26	−7	13	
6	Ørn	14	6	0	8	28	24	+4	12	
7	Fram Larvik (R)	14	4	2	8	18	33	−15	10	Relegation to Third Division
8	Haugar (R)	14	0	5	9	12	32	−20	5	Relegation to Third Division

Source: rsssf.no
Rules for classification: 1) points; 2) goal difference; 3) number of goals scored.
(C) Champions; (P) Promoted; (R) Relegated

=== Group B ===
Pos	Team	Pld	W	D	L	GF	GA	GD	Pts	Promotion, qualification or relegation
1	Steinkjer (C, P)	14	10	1	3	35	14	+21	21	Promotion to First Division
2	Nidelv	14	8	1	5	24	17	+7	17	
3	Rosenborg	14	6	3	5	22	19	+3	15	Qualification for the Cup Winners' Cup first round (Note: Rosenborg qualified for the European Cup Winners' Cup as Norwegian Cup winners.)
4	Østsiden	14	5	4	5	25	23	+2	14	
5	Lillestrøm	14	6	2	6	25	25	0	14	
6	Kvik	14	5	4	5	20	25	−5	14	
7	Strømmen (R)	14	5	3	6	17	17	0	13	Relegation to Third Division
8	Greåker (R)	14	2	0	12	16	44	−28	4	Relegation to Third Division

Source: rsssf.no
Rules for classification: 1) points; 2) goal difference; 3) number of goals scored.
(C) Champions; (P) Promoted; (R) Relegated
