= 1964 Norwegian Football Cup =

Norgesmesterskapet i fotball for menn 1964

Tournament details
- Country: Norway
- Teams: 128 (main competition)

Final positions
- Champions: Rosenborg (2nd title)
- Runners-up: Sarpsborg

The 1964 Norwegian Football Cup was the 59th edition of the Norwegian annual knockout football tournament. The Cup was won by Rosenborg after beating Sarpsborg in the cup final with the score 2–1. This was Rosenborg's second Norwegian Cup title.

== First round ==
Team 1	Score	Team 2
Arna	1–2 (a.e.t.)	Nymark
Asker	3–0	Spartacus
Askim	1–3	Aurskog
Bodø/Glimt	3–1	Harstad
Borgen Sarpsborg	1–0	Sparta
Brage	2–3	Åndalsnes
Brann	10–0	Hardy
Brumunddal	2–3 (a.e.t.)	Gjøvik-Lyn
Bryne	3–1	Egersund
Clausenengen	3–4	Kristiansund
Djerv	3–0	Voss
Drafn	4–1	Mjøndalen
Eidsvold Turn	2–2 (a.e.t.)	Sagene
Freidig	1–2	Kvik (Trondheim)
Fremad Lillehammer	4–0	Sel
Frigg	5–1	Furuset
Grane	0–3	Borg
Greåker	3–2	Kvik (Halden)
Hasselvika	1–3	Falken
Herd	1–2	Langevåg
Jarl	2–2 (a.e.t.)	Randaberg
Jerv	3–1	Øyestad
Jotun	0–3	HamKam'
Kjellmyra	0–3	Lillestrøm
Kongsberg	0–4	Eik
Kråkstad	0–11	Fredrikstad
Larvik Turn	6–0	Kragerø
Lisleby	2–1	Selbak
Lyn	4–0	Sørli
Mjølner	1–1 (a.e.t.)	Tromsø
Molde	9–0	Braatt
Moss	1–1 (a.e.t.)	Skiold
Nærbø	1–4	Mandalskameratene
Os	0–1	Baune
Pors	4–2	Snøgg
Ranheim	0–11	Nidelv
Raufoss	4–2	Lena
Røros	1–2	Koppang
Rollon	1–0	Hødd
Rosenborg	6–1	Freidig
Sandaker/Aasen	0–6	Skeid
Sandefjord BK	2–0	Herkules
Sarpsborg	4–0	Lervik
Sem	1–1 (a.e.t.)	Fram (Larvik)
Skiens-Grane	0–4	Runar
Start	3–1	Flekkefjord
Steinkjer	8–1	Sverre
Strømmen	1–0	Skreia
Strømsgodset	1–0	Hafslund
Sørfjell	0–4	Donn
Tryggkameratene	0–3	Nessegutten
Tønsberg Turn	0–5	Åssiden
Ulf	1–0	Viking
Vard	1–1 (a.e.t.)	Ny-Krohnborg
Varegg	2–3	Djerv 1919
Velledalen/Ringen	1–3	Aalesund
Verdal	1–0	Orkanger
Vidar	3–0	Haugar
Vigør	1–0	Stavanger
Vindbjart	0–5	Odd
Vålerengen	3–0	Jevnaker
Årstad	5–1	Nordnes
Ørn	6–0	Drammens BK
Østsiden	6–0	Stabæk
Replay
Fram (Larvik)	3–0	Sem
Ny-Krohnborg	1–3	Vard
Randaberg	1–0	Jarl
Sagene	0–1	Eidsvold Turn
Skiold	0–3	Moss
Tromsø	2–1	Mjølner

== Second round ==
Team 1	Score	Team 2
Aurskog	0–2	Borgen Sarpsborg
Baune	2–5	Bryne
Bodø/Glimt	6–0	Verdal
Borg	2–5 (a.e.t.)	Vålerengen
Djerv 1919	2–2 (a.e.t.)	Djerv
Donn	0–0 (a.e.t.)	Ulf
Eidsvold Turn	2–0	Frigg
Eik	0–3	Larvik Turn
Falken	0–2	Molde
Fram (Larvik)	2–3	Vigør
Fredrikstad	2–0	Asker
Gjøvik-Lyn	3–1	Fremad Lillehammer
Greåker	2–1	Lisleby
HamKam	1–1 (a.e.t.)	Strømmen
Jerv	1–1 (a.e.t.)	Sandefjord BK
Kristiansund	3–4	Rosenborg
Langevåg	0–2	Raufoss
Lillestrøm	1–2	Drafn
Mandalskameratene	2–1	Start
Moss	2–4	Sarpsborg
Nessegutten	1–3	Steinkjer
Nidelv	2–1	Tromsø
Nymark	1–3	Årstad
Randaberg	1–0	Vidar
Runar	2–4	Ørn
Skeid	7–0	Koppang
Aalesund	0–1	Rollon
Åndalsnes	0–5	Kvik (Trondheim)
Åssiden	1–2	Østsiden
Lyn	6–3	Strømsgodset
Odd	2–1	Pors
Brann	5–1	Vard
Replay
Djerv	2–4	Djerv 1919
Ulf	3–2	Donn
Strømmen	1–2	HamKam
Sandefjord BK	4–0	Jerv

== Third round ==
Team 1	Score	Team 2
2 August 1964
Larvik Turn	1–0	Lyn
Sarpsborg	2–1	Eidsvold Turn
Raufoss	3–1	Greåker
Drafn	8–4 (a.e.t.)	Nidelv
Sandefjord BK	3–1	Randaberg
Ulf	0–2	Odd
Molde	3–2	Fredrikstad
Rosenborg	2–0	Rollon
Østsiden	0–3	HamKam
Bryne	1–3	Årstad
Borgen Sarpsborg	0–3	Skeid
Vigør	2–1	Ørn
Kvik (Trondheim)	0–3	Gjøvik-Lyn
Vålerengen	4–3	Mandalskameratene
Djerv 1919	1–4	Brann
Steinkjer	5–2	Bodø/Glimt

== Fourth round ==
Team 1	Score	Team 2
23 August 1964
Årstad	3–2 (a.e.t.)	Raufoss
Molde	0–2	Vålerengen
Odd	1–0	Larvik Turn
Vigør	1–2	Sandefjord BK
Skeid	1–2	Rosenborg
HamKam	1–2	Brann
Gjøvik-Lyn	0–2	Steinkjer
Drafn	2–5	Sarpsborg

== Quarter-finals ==
Team 1	Score	Team 2
6 September 1964
Sarpsborg	1–0	Steinkjer
Vålerengen	4–2 (a.e.t.)	Brann
Årstad	1–3 (a.e.t.)	Odd
Rosenborg	3–1 (a.e.t.)	Sandefjord BK

== Semi-finals ==
Team 1	Score	Team 2
18 October 1964
Rosenborg	3–1	Vålerengen
Odd	1–1 (a.e.t.)	Sarpsborg
Replay: 21 October 1964
Sarpsborg	2–0 (a.e.t.)	Odd

== Final ==
25 October 1964
13:15 CET (UTC+1)

Rosenborg	2–1	Sarpsborg
Kleveland 32'; Pedersen 55'	Report	Kjølholdt 85' (pen.)

Ullevaal Stadion, Oslo
Attendance: 24,665
Referee: Johan Riseth (Namsos)

Rosenborg's squad: Sverre Fornes, Knut Jensen, Kjell Hvidsand, Kåre Rønnes, Harald Gulbrandsen, Egil Nygaard, Tore Pedersen, Birger Thingstad, Tore Lindvåg, Eldar Hansen and Tor Kleveland.
