= Rosenborg BK in European football =

Norwegian football club

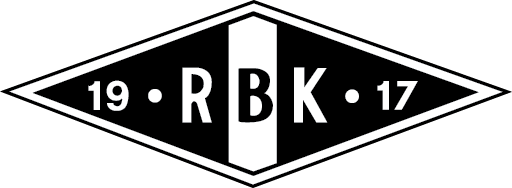
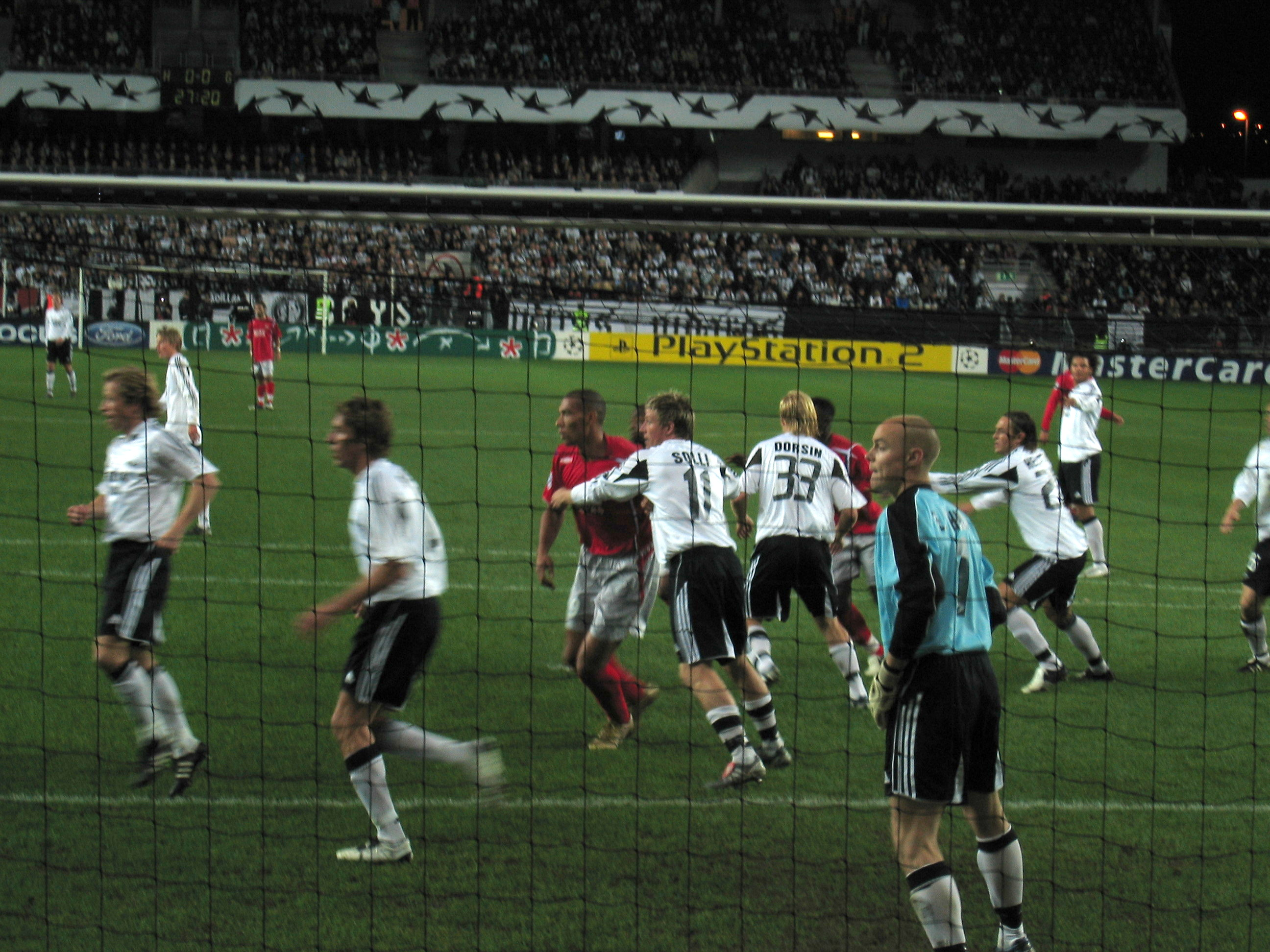
- Top: Rosenborg BK's official logo Bottom: Rosenborg playing against Lyon at Lerkendal Stadion during the 2005–06 UEFA Champions League
- Club: Rosenborg
- First entry: 1965–66 European Cup Winners' Cup
- Latest entry: 2025–26 UEFA Conference League

Titles
- Champions League: 0 (Best result: Quarter-finals in 1996–97)
- Europa League: 0 (Best result: Round 3/Round of 32 thrice, firstly in 2003–04, then secondly in 2005–06, and thirdly in 2007–08)
- Conference League: 0 (Best result: Play-off round twice, firstly in 2021–22, then secondly in 2025–26)

Rosenborg Ballklub is an association football club which currently competes in Eliteserien (formerly known as Tippeligaen) from Trondheim, Trøndelag, central Norway and, at the same time, the most important in the country by far, both in terms of domestic performances as well as in terms of European record, thus surpassing close rivals Molde by a significant extent. With its rich history and tradition, the team has participated in 32 seasons of Union of European Football Associations (UEFA) club competitions, including 21 seasons in the European Cup and Champions League (UCL), 16 seasons in the UEFA Cup and Europa League (UEL), one season in the Cup Winners' Cup, and one season in the Intertoto Cup. In addition, the club had also participated in two editions of the new UEFA competition UEFA Europa Conference League (UECL). Their home stadium is Lerkendal.

Rosenborg has played six times in the UEFA Cup after qualifying via the Champions League and once via the Intertoto Cup. It has played 206 UEFA games, resulting in 81 wins, 39 draws, and 86 defeats. The club's first appearance was in the 1965–66 European Cup Winners' Cup, and it subsequently entered tournaments in six seasons until 1974–75. The club's next appearance was in the 1986–87 European Cup, and then in the 1989–90 European Cup.

Since then, Rosenborg has been involved in a UEFA tournament every season except the 2006–07 season. The club's best performance is reaching the quarter-finals of the 1996–97 Champions League, while their only European trophy came when they co-won the 2008 UEFA Intertoto Cup.

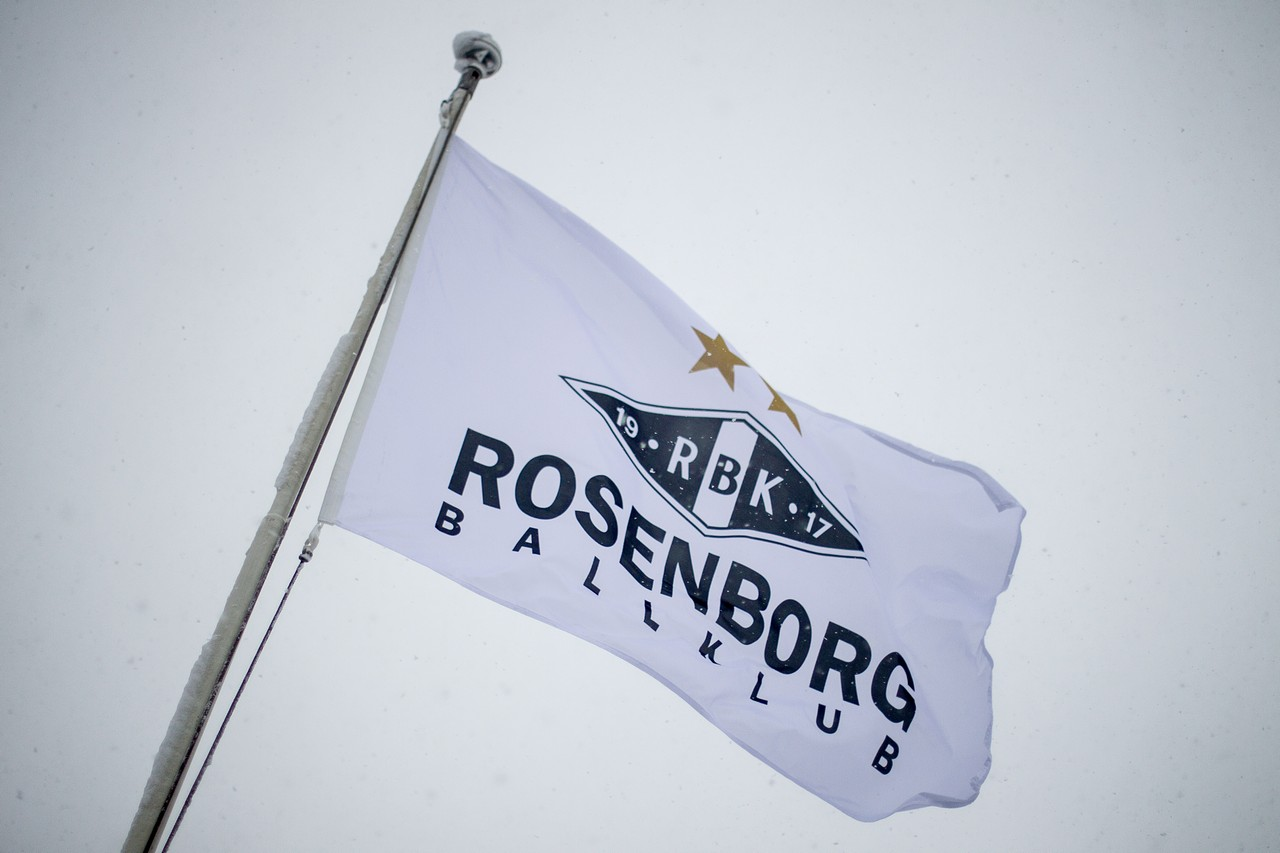
Flag depicting Rosenborg BK's official logo in Trondheim, Norway.

Since the competition's introduction, Rosenborg are one of the few clubs to have advanced from the first qualifying round of the UEFA Europa League all the way to the group stage, and have achieved this on two occasions (another Norwegian club, Tromsø, were successful with the help of a disqualification).

The club plays its home matches at Lerkendal Stadion, an all-seater stadium in Trondheim. Since the last rebuilding in 2002, it can host 21,166 spectators. Rosenborg's record attendance in a European match of 22,492 dates from the 1968–69 European Cup match against Rapid Wien.

Rosenborg's biggest win is 7–1 against Astana in the 2007–08 UEFA Champions League qualification, while the biggest defeat is 1–9 against Hibernian in the 1974–75 UEFA Cup. With 133 caps, Roar Strand has appeared in the most UEFA matches for Rosenborg, while Harald Brattbakk has scored the most goals with 28. Rosenborg has played Juventus, Porto, and Real Madrid six times, more than any other team.

== Key ==
- S = Seasons
- P = Played
- W = Games won
- D = Games drawn
- L = Games lost
- F = Goals for
- A = Goals against
- aet = Match determined after extra time
- ag = Match determined by away goals rule
- QF = Quarter-finals
- Group = Group stage
- Group 2 = Second group stage
- PO = Play-off round
- R32 = Round of 32
- R3 = Round 3
- R2 = Round 2
- R1 = Round 1
- Q3 = Third qualification round
- Q2 = Second qualification round
- Q1 = First qualification round
- Q = Qualification round

== All-time statistics ==
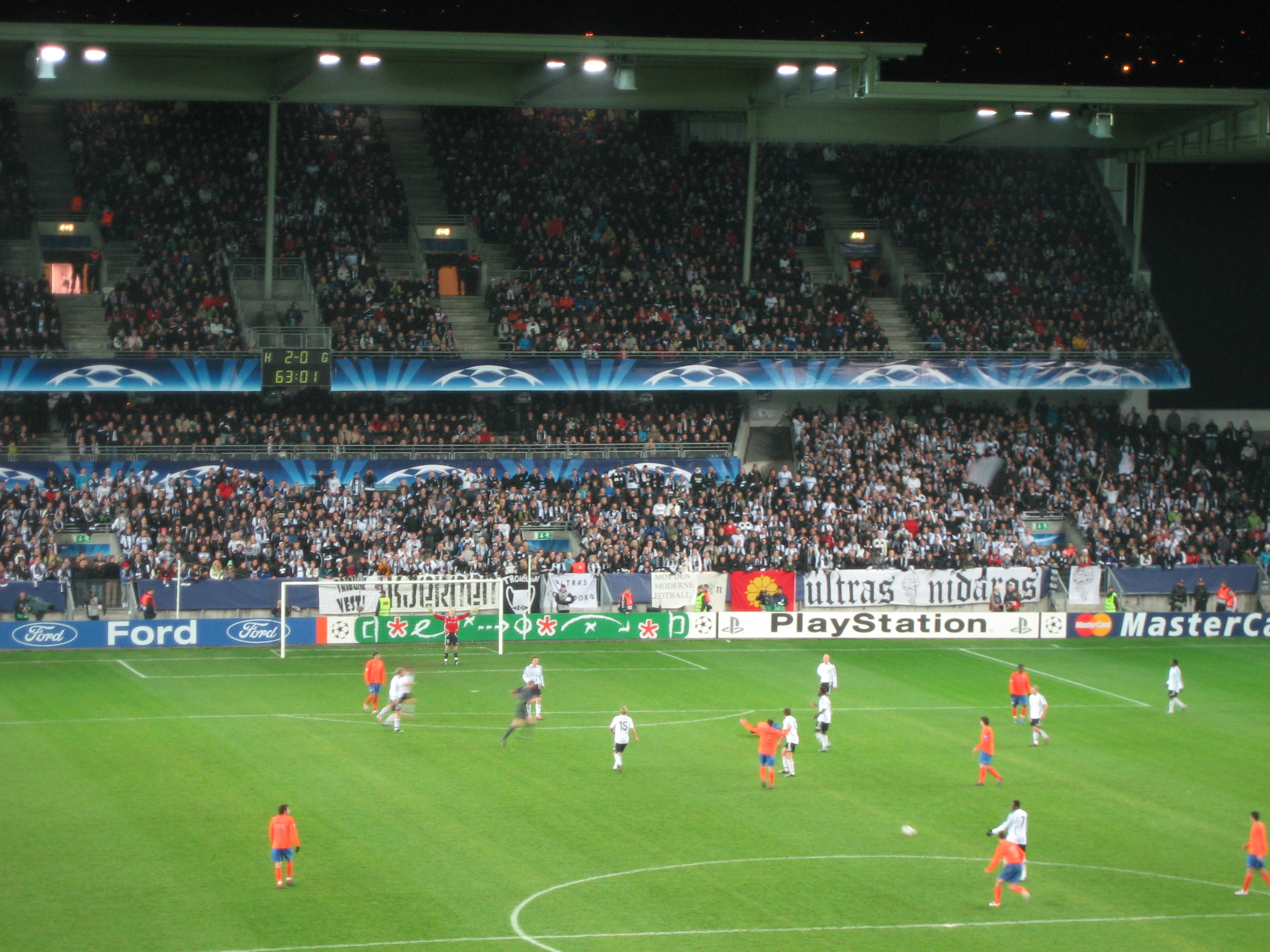
Rosenborg playing against Valencia at Lerkendal Stadion during the 2007–08 UEFA Champions League

The following is a list of the all-time statistics from Rosenborg's games in the four UEFA tournaments it has participated in, as well as the overall total. The list contains the tournament, the number of games played (P), won (W), drawn (D) and lost (L). The number of goals scored (GF), goals against (GA), goal difference (GD) and the percentage of matches won (Win%).

Updated 28 August 2025

Tournament	P	W	D	L	GF	GA	GD	Win%
Champions League / European Cup	152	58	31	63	224	232	−8	38.16
Europa League / UEFA Cup	114	45	20	49	164	163	+1	39.47
UEFA Conference League	16	10	2	4	34	21	+13	62.50
Cup Winners' Cup	4	2	0	2	7	8	−1	50.00
UEFA Intertoto Cup	4	3	0	1	9	2	+7	75.00
Total	290	118	53	119	438	426	+12	40.69

== Matches ==
The following is a complete list of matches played by Rosenborg in UEFA tournaments. It includes the season, tournament, the stage, the opponent club and its country, the date, the venue and the score, with Rosenborg's score noted first. It is up to date as of 28 August 2025.

List of Rosenborg BK matches in European football
Season	Tournament	Stage	Opponent		Date	Venue	Score	Ref.
Season	Tournament	Stage	Team	Country	Date	Venue	Score	Ref.
1965–66	Cup Winners' Cup	R1	KR Reykjavík	Iceland	24 August 1965	KR-völlur, Reykjavík	3–1	
1965–66	Cup Winners' Cup	R1	KR Reykjavík	Iceland	12 September 1965	Lerkendal Stadion, Trondheim	3–1	
1965–66	Cup Winners' Cup	R2	Dynamo Kyiv	Soviet Union	24 October 1965	Lerkendal Stadion, Trondheim	1–4	
1965–66	Cup Winners' Cup	R2	Dynamo Kyiv	Soviet Union	28 October 1965	Lobanovskyi Dynamo Stadium, Kyiv	0–2	
1968–69	European Cup	R1	Rapid Wien	Austria	18 September 1968	Lerkendal Stadion, Trondheim	1–3	
1968–69	European Cup	R1	Rapid Wien	Austria	2 October 1968	Ernst-Happel-Stadion, Vienna	3–3	
1969–70	Inter-Cities Fairs Cup	R1	Southampton	England	17 September 1969	Lerkendal Stadion, Trondheim	1–0	
1969–70	Inter-Cities Fairs Cup	R1	Southampton	England	1 October 1969	The Dell, Southampton	0–2	
1970–71	European Cup	R1	Standard Liège	Belgium	16 September 1970	Lerkendal Stadion, Trondheim	0–2	
1970–71	European Cup	R1	Standard Liège	Belgium	30 September 1970	Stade Maurice Dufrasne, Liège	0–5	
1971–72	UEFA Cup	R1	IFK Helsinki	Finland	15 September 1971	Lerkendal Stadion, Trondheim	3–0	
1971–72	UEFA Cup	R1	IFK Helsinki	Finland	29 September 1971	Töölön Pallokenttä, Helsinki	1–0	
1971–72	UEFA Cup	R2	Lierse	Belgium	20 October 1971	Ullevaal Stadion, Oslo (Note: Rosenborg played the 1971–72 UEFA Cup match at home against Lierse at Ullevaal Stadion in Oslo due to weather conditions making it impossible to play at their home ground Lerkendal stadion.)	4–1	
1971–72	UEFA Cup	R2	Lierse	Belgium	3 November 1971	Herman Vanderpoortenstadion, Lier	0–3 (a)	
1972–73	European Cup	R1	Celtic	Scotland	13 September 1972	Celtic Park, Glasgow	1–2	
1972–73	European Cup	R1	Celtic	Scotland	27 September 1972	Lerkendal Stadion, Trondheim	1–3	
1974–75	UEFA Cup	R1	Hibernian	Scotland	18 September 1974	Lerkendal Stadion, Trondheim	2–3	
1974–75	UEFA Cup	R1	Hibernian	Scotland	2 October 1974	Easter Road, Edinburgh	1–9	
1986–87	European Cup	R1	Linfield	Northern Ireland	17 September 1986	Lerkendal Stadion, Trondheim	1–0	
1986–87	European Cup	R1	Linfield	Northern Ireland	1 October 1986	Windsor Park, Belfast	1–1	
1986–87	European Cup	R2	Red Star Belgrade	(Socialist Federal Republic of Yugoslavia) Yugoslavia	22 October 1986	Lerkendal Stadion, Trondheim	0–3	
1986–87	European Cup	R2	Red Star Belgrade	(Socialist Federal Republic of Yugoslavia) Yugoslavia	5 November 1986	Stadion Crvena Zvezda, Belgrade	1–4	
1989–90	European Cup	R1	Mechelen	Belgium	13 September 1989	Lerkendal Stadion, Trondheim	0–0	
1989–90	European Cup	R1	Mechelen	Belgium	27 September 1989	Argosstadion Achter de Kazerne, Mechelen	0–5	
1990–91	UEFA Cup	R1	Chornomorets Odesa	Soviet Union	19 September 1990	Spartak Stadium, Odessa	1–3	
1990–91	UEFA Cup	R1	Chornomorets Odesa	Soviet Union	3 October 1990	Lerkendal Stadion, Trondheim	2–1	
1991–92	European Cup	R1	Sampdoria	Italy	18 September 1991	Stadio Luigi Ferraris, Genoa	0–5	
1991–92	European Cup	R1	Sampdoria	Italy	2 October 1991	Lerkendal Stadion, Trondheim	1–2	
1992–93	UEFA Cup	R1	Dynamo Moscow	Russia	16 September 1992	Dynamo Stadium, Moscow	1–5	
1992–93	UEFA Cup	R1	Dynamo Moscow	Russia	30 September 1992	Lerkendal Stadion, Trondheim	2–0	
1993–94	Champions League	Q	Avenir Beggen	Luxembourg	18 August 1993	Stade rue Henri Dunant, Luxembourg	2–0	
1993–94	Champions League	Q	Avenir Beggen	Luxembourg	1 September 1993	Lerkendal Stadion, Trondheim	1–0	
1993–94	Champions League	R1	Austria Wien	Austria	15 September 1993	Lerkendal Stadion, Trondheim	3–1	
1993–94	Champions League	R1	Austria Wien	Austria	29 September 1993	Franz Horr Stadium, Vienna	1–4	
1994–95	UEFA Cup	Q	Grevenmacher	Luxembourg	9 August 1994	Op Flohr Stadion, Grevenmacher	2–1	
1994–95	UEFA Cup	Q	Grevenmacher	Luxembourg	23 August 1994	Lerkendal Stadion, Trondheim	6–0	
1994–95	UEFA Cup	R1	Deportivo La Coruña	Spain	13 September 1994	Lerkendal Stadion, Trondheim	1–0	
1994–95	UEFA Cup	R1	Deportivo La Coruña	Spain	27 September 1994	Estadio Riazor, A Coruña	1–4 (a.e.t.)	
1995–96	Champions League	Q	Beşiktaş	Turkey	9 August 1995	Lerkendal Stadion, Trondheim	3–0	
1995–96	Champions League	Q	Beşiktaş	Turkey	23 August 1995	BJK İnönü Stadium, Istanbul	1–3	
1995–96	Champions League	Group	Legia Warsaw	Poland	13 September 1995	Wojska Polskiego Stadium, Warsaw	1–3	
1995–96	Champions League	Group	Blackburn Rovers	England	27 September 1995	Lerkendal Stadion, Trondheim	2–1	
1995–96	Champions League	Group	Spartak Moskva	Russia	18 October 1995	Lerkendal Stadion, Trondheim	2–4	
1995–96	Champions League	Group	Spartak Moskva	Russia	1 November 1995	Lokomotiv Stadium, Moscow	1–4	
1995–96	Champions League	Group	Legia Warsaw	Poland	22 November 1995	Lerkendal Stadion, Trondheim	4–0	
1995–96	Champions League	Group	Blackburn Rovers	England	6 December 1995	Ewood Park, Blackburn	1–4	
1996–97	Champions League	Q	Panathinaikos	Greece	7 August 1996	Leoforos Alexandras Stadium, Athens	0–1	
1996–97	Champions League	Q	Panathinaikos	Greece	21 August 1996	Lerkendal Stadion, Trondheim	3–0 (a.e.t.)	
1996–97	Champions League	Group	IFK Göteborg	Sweden	11 September 1996	Ullevi, Gothenburg	3–2	
1996–97	Champions League	Group	Milan	Italy	25 September 1996	Lerkendal Stadion, Trondheim	1–4	
1996–97	Champions League	Group	Porto	Portugal	16 October 1996	Lerkendal Stadion, Trondheim	0–1	
1996–97	Champions League	Group	Porto	Portugal	30 October 1996	Estádio das Antas, Porto	0–3	
1996–97	Champions League	Group	IFK Göteborg	Sweden	20 November 1996	Lerkendal Stadion, Trondheim	1–0	
1996–97	Champions League	Group	Milan	Italy	4 December 1996	San Siro, Milan	2–1	
1996–97	Champions League	QF	Juventus	Italy	5 March 1997	Lerkendal Stadion, Trondheim	1–1	
1996–97	Champions League	QF	Juventus	Italy	19 March 1997	Stadio delle Alpi, Turin	0–2	
1997–98	Champions League	Q2	MTK Budapest	Hungary	14 August 1997	Hidegkuti Nándor Stadium, Budapest	1–0	
1997–98	Champions League	Q2	MTK Budapest	Hungary	27 August 1997	Lerkendal Stadion, Trondheim	3–1	
1997–98	Champions League	Group	Real Madrid	Spain	17 September 1997	Santiago Bernabéu Stadium, Madrid	1–4	
1997–98	Champions League	Group	Olympiacos	Greece	1 October 1997	Lerkendal Stadion, Trondheim	5–1	
1997–98	Champions League	Group	Porto	Portugal	22 October 1997	Lerkendal Stadion, Trondheim	2–0	
1997–98	Champions League	Group	Porto	Portugal	5 November 1997	Estádio das Antas, Porto	1–1	
1997–98	Champions League	Group	Real Madrid	Spain	27 November 1997	Lerkendal Stadion, Trondheim	2–0	
1997–98	Champions League	Group	Olympiacos	Greece	10 December 1997	Olympic Stadium, Athens	2–2	
1998–99	Champions League	Q2	Club Brugge	Belgium	12 August 1998	Lerkendal Stadion, Trondheim	2–0	
1998–99	Champions League	Q2	Club Brugge	Belgium	26 August 1998	Jan Breydel Stadium, Bruges	2–4 (a)	
1998–99	Champions League	Group	Athletic Bilbao	Spain	16 September 1998	San Mamés Stadium, Bilbao	1–1	
1998–99	Champions League	Group	Juventus	Italy	30 September 1998	Lerkendal Stadion, Trondheim	1–1	
1998–99	Champions League	Group	Galatasaray	Turkey	21 October 1998	Lerkendal Stadion, Trondheim	3–0	
1998–99	Champions League	Group	Galatasaray	Turkey	4 November 1998	Ali Sami Yen Stadium, Istanbul	0–3	
1998–99	Champions League	Group	Athletic Bilbao	Spain	25 November 1998	Lerkendal Stadion, Trondheim	2–1	
1998–99	Champions League	Group	Juventus	Italy	9 December 1998	Stadio delle Alpi, Turin	0–2	
1999–2000	Champions League	Group	Boavista	Portugal	14 September 1999	Estádio do Bessa, Porto	3–0	
1999–2000	Champions League	Group	Feyenoord	Netherlands	22 September 1999	Lerkendal Stadion, Trondheim	2–2	
1999–2000	Champions League	Group	Borussia Dortmund	Germany	29 September 1999	Lerkendal Stadion, Trondheim	2–2	
1999–2000	Champions League	Group	Borussia Dortmund	Germany	19 October 1999	Westfalenstadion, Dortmund	3–0	
1999–2000	Champions League	Group	Boavista	Portugal	27 October 1999	Lerkendal Stadion, Trondheim	2–0	
1999–2000	Champions League	Group	Feyenoord	Netherlands	2 November 1999	Feijenoord Stadion, Rotterdam	0–1	
1999–2000	Champions League	Group 2	Bayern Munich	Germany	24 November 1999	Lerkendal Stadion, Trondheim	1–1	
1999–2000	Champions League	Group 2	Real Madrid	Spain	7 December 1999	Santiago Bernabéu Stadium, Madrid	1–3	
1999–2000	Champions League	Group 2	Dynamo Kyiv	Ukraine	29 February 2000	Olympic NSC, Kyiv	1–2	
1999–2000	Champions League	Group 2	Dynamo Kyiv	Ukraine	8 March 2000	Lerkendal Stadion, Trondheim	1–2	
1999–2000	Champions League	Group 2	Bayern Munich	Germany	14 March 2000	Olympiastadion, Munich	1–2	
1999–2000	Champions League	Group 2	Real Madrid	Spain	22 March 2000	Lerkendal Stadion, Trondheim	0–1	
2000–01	Champions League	Q2	Shelbourne	(Republic of Ireland) Ireland	26 July 2000	Tolka Park, Dublin	3–1	
2000–01	Champions League	Q2	Shelbourne	(Republic of Ireland) Ireland	2 August 2000	Lerkendal Stadion, Trondheim	1–1	
2000–01	Champions League	Q3	Dunaferr	Hungary	9 August 2000	Dunaferr Arena, Dunaújváros	2–2	
2000–01	Champions League	Q3	Dunaferr	Hungary	23 August 2000	Lerkendal Stadion, Trondheim	2–1	
2000–01	Champions League	Group	Paris-Saint Germain	France	13 September 2000	Lerkendal Stadion, Trondheim	3–1	
2000–01	Champions League	Group	Bayern Munich	Germany	19 September 2000	Olympiastadion, Munich	1–3	
2000–01	Champions League	Group	Helsingborg	Sweden	26 September 2000	Lerkendal Stadion, Trondheim	6–1	
2000–01	Champions League	Group	Helsingborg	Sweden	18 October 2000	Olympia, Helsingborg	0–2	
2000–01	Champions League	Group	Paris-Saint Germain	France	24 October 2000	Parc des Princes, Paris	2–7	
2000–01	Champions League	Group	Bayern Munich	Germany	8 November 2000	Lerkendal Stadion, Trondheim	1–1	
2000–01	UEFA Cup	R3	Alavés	Spain	23 November 2000	Estadio Mendizorrotza, Vitoria-Gasteiz	1–1	
2000–01	UEFA Cup	R3	Alavés	Spain	7 December 2000	Lerkendal Stadion, Trondheim	1–3	
2001–02	Champions League	Q3	Inter Bratislava	Slovakia	8 August 2001	Štadión Pasienky, Bratislava	3–3	
2001–02	Champions League	Q3	Inter Bratislava	Slovakia	22 August 2001	Lerkendal Stadion, Trondheim	4–0	
2001–02	Champions League	Group	Porto	Portugal	18 September 2001	Lerkendal Stadion, Trondheim	1–2	
2001–02	Champions League	Group	Juventus	Italy	25 September 2001	Lerkendal Stadion, Trondheim	1–1	
2001–02	Champions League	Group	Celtic	Scotland	10 October 2001	Celtic Park, Glasgow	0–1	
2001–02	Champions League	Group	Juventus	Italy	17 October 2001	Stadio delle Alpi, Turin	0–1	
2001–02	Champions League	Group	Celtic	Scotland	23 October 2001	Lerkendal Stadion, Trondheim	2–0	
2001–02	Champions League	Group	Porto	Portugal	31 October 2001	Estádio das Antas, Porto	0–1	
2002–03	Champions League	Q3	Brøndby	Denmark	14 August 2002	Lerkendal Stadion, Trondheim	1–0	
2002–03	Champions League	Q3	Brøndby	Denmark	28 August 2002	Brøndby Stadium, Copenhagen	3–2	
2002–03	Champions League	Group	Internazionale	Italy	17 September 2002	Lerkendal Stadion, Trondheim	2–2	
2002–03	Champions League	Group	Lyon	France	25 September 2002	Stade de Gerland, Lyon	0–5	
2002–03	Champions League	Group	Ajax	Netherlands	2 October 2002	Lerkendal Stadion, Trondheim	0–0	
2002–03	Champions League	Group	Ajax	Netherlands	22 October 2002	Amsterdam Arena, Amsterdam	1–1	
2002–03	Champions League	Group	Internazionale	Italy	30 October 2002	San Siro, Milan	0–3	
2002–03	Champions League	Group	Lyon	France	12 November 2002	Lerkendal Stadion, Trondheim	1–1	
2003–04	Champions League	Q2	Bohemian	(Republic of Ireland) Ireland	30 July 2003	Dalymount Park, Dublin	1–0	
2003–04	Champions League	Q2	Bohemian	(Republic of Ireland) Ireland	6 August 2003	Lerkendal Stadion, Trondheim	4–0	
2003–04	Champions League	Q3	Deportivo La Coruña	Spain	13 August 2003	Lerkendal Stadion, Trondheim	0–0	
2003–04	Champions League	Q3	Deportivo La Coruña	Spain	26 August 2003	Estadio Riazor, A Coruña	0–1	
2003–04	UEFA Cup	R1	Ventspils	Latvia	24 September 2003	Ventspils Olimpiskais Stadions, Ventspils	4–1	
2003–04	UEFA Cup	R1	Ventspils	Latvia	15 October 2003	Lerkendal Stadion, Trondheim	6–0	
2003–04	UEFA Cup	R2	Red Star Belgrade	Serbia and Montenegro	29 October 2003	Lerkendal Stadion, Trondheim	0–0	
2003–04	UEFA Cup	R2	Red Star Belgrade	Serbia and Montenegro	27 November 2003	Stadion Crvena Zvezda, Belgrade	1–0	
2003–04	UEFA Cup	R3	Benfica	Portugal	26 February 2004	Estádio da Luz, Lisbon	0–1	
2003–04	UEFA Cup	R3	Benfica	Portugal	3 March 2004	Lerkendal Stadion, Trondheim	2–1 (a)	
2004–05	Champions League	Q2	Sheriff Tiraspol	Moldova	28 July 2004	Lerkendal Stadion, Trondheim	2–1	
2004–05	Champions League	Q2	Sheriff Tiraspol	Moldova	4 August 2004	Sheriff Stadium, Tiraspol	2–0	
2004–05	Champions League	Q3	Maccabi Haifa	Israel	11 August 2004	Lerkendal Stadion, Trondheim	2–1	
2004–05	Champions League	Q3	Maccabi Haifa	Israel	24 August 2004	Ramat Gan Stadium, Ramat Gan	3–2 (a.e.t.)	
2004–05	Champions League	Group	Panathinaikos	Greece	14 September 2004	Leoforos Alexandras Stadium, Athens	1–2	
2004–05	Champions League	Group	Arsenal	England	29 September 2004	Lerkendal Stadion, Trondheim	1–1	
2004–05	Champions League	Group	PSV Eindhoven	Netherlands	20 October 2004	Lerkendal Stadion, Trondheim	1–2	
2004–05	Champions League	Group	PSV Eindhoven	Netherlands	2 November 2004	Philips Stadion, Eindhoven	0–1	
2004–05	Champions League	Group	Panathinaikos	Greece	24 November 2004	Lerkendal Stadion, Trondheim	2–2	
2004–05	Champions League	Group	Arsenal	England	7 December 2004	Highbury, London	1–5	
2005–06	Champions League	Q3	Steaua București	Romania	10 August 2005	Stadionul Steaua, Bucharest	1–1	
2005–06	Champions League	Q3	Steaua București	Romania	23 August 2005	Lerkendal Stadion, Trondheim	3–2	
2005–06	Champions League	Group	Olympiacos	Greece	13 September 2005	Karaiskakis Stadium, Piraeus	3–1	
2005–06	Champions League	Group	Lyon	France	28 September 2005	Lerkendal Stadion, Trondheim	0–1	
2005–06	Champions League	Group	Real Madrid	Spain	19 October 2005	Santiago Bernabéu Stadium, Madrid	1–4	
2005–06	Champions League	Group	Real Madrid	Spain	1 November 2005	Lerkendal Stadion, Trondheim	0–2	
2005–06	Champions League	Group	Olympiacos	Greece	23 November 2005	Lerkendal Stadion, Trondheim	1–1	
2005–06	Champions League	Group	Lyon	France	6 December 2005	Stade de Gerland, Lyon	1–2	
2005–06	UEFA Cup	R32	Zenit St. Petersburg	Russia	15 February 2006	Lerkendal Stadion, Trondheim	0–2	
2005–06	UEFA Cup	R32	Zenit St. Petersburg	Russia	23 February 2006	Petrovsky Stadium, Saint Petersburg	1–2	
2007–08	Champions League	Q2	Astana	Kazakhstan	1 August 2007	Kazhimukan Munaitpasov Stadium, Astana	3–1	
2007–08	Champions League	Q2	Astana	Kazakhstan	8 August 2007	Lerkendal Stadion, Trondheim	7–1	
2007–08	Champions League	Q3	Tampere United	Finland	15 August 2007	Ratina Stadion, Tampere	3–0	
2007–08	Champions League	Q3	Tampere United	Finland	29 August 2007	Lerkendal Stadion, Trondheim	2–0	
2007–08	Champions League	Group	Chelsea	England	18 September 2007	Stamford Bridge, London	1–1	
2007–08	Champions League	Group	Schalke 04	Germany	3 October 2007	Lerkendal Stadion, Trondheim	0–2	
2007–08	Champions League	Group	Valencia	Spain	24 October 2007	Lerkendal Stadion, Trondheim	2–0	
2007–08	Champions League	Group	Valencia	Spain	6 November 2007	Estadio Mestalla, Valencia	2–0	
2007–08	Champions League	Group	Chelsea	England	28 November 2007	Lerkendal Stadion, Trondheim	0–4	
2007–08	Champions League	Group	Schalke 04	Germany	11 December 2007	Arena AufSchalke, Gelsenkirchen	1–3	
2007–08	UEFA Cup	R32	Fiorentina	Italy	14 February 2008	Lerkendal Stadion, Trondheim	0–1	
2007–08	UEFA Cup	R32	Fiorentina	Italy	21 February 2008	Stadio Artemio Franchi, Florence	1–2	
2008–09	Intertoto Cup	R2	Ekranas	Lithuania	6 July 2008	Aukštaitija Stadium, Panevėžys	3–1	
2008–09	Intertoto Cup	R2	Ekranas	Lithuania	13 July 2008	Lerkendal Stadion, Trondheim	4–0	
2008–09	Intertoto Cup	R3	NAC Breda	Netherlands	19 July 2008	Rat Verlegh Stadion, Breda	0–1	
2008–09	Intertoto Cup	R3	NAC Breda	Netherlands	27 July 2008	Lerkendal Stadion, Trondheim	2–0	
2008–09	UEFA Cup	Q2	Djurgården	Sweden	14 August 2008	Råsunda Stadium, Stockholm	1–2	
2008–09	UEFA Cup	Q2	Djurgården	Sweden	28 August 2008	Lerkendal Stadion, Trondheim	5–0	
2008–09	UEFA Cup	R1	Brøndby	Denmark	18 September 2008	Brøndby Stadium, Copenhagen	2–1	
2008–09	UEFA Cup	R1	Brøndby	Denmark	2 October 2008	Lerkendal Stadion, Trondheim	3–2	
2008–09	UEFA Cup	Group	Club Brugge	Belgium	23 October 2008	Lerkendal Stadion, Trondheim	0–0	
2008–09	UEFA Cup	Group	Saint-Étienne	France	6 November 2008	Stade Geoffroy-Guichard, Saint-Étienne	0–3	
2008–09	UEFA Cup	Group	Valencia	Spain	27 November 2008	Lerkendal Stadion, Trondheim	0–4	
2008–09	UEFA Cup	Group	Copenhagen	Denmark	4 December 2008	Parken Stadion, Copenhagen	1–1	
2009–10	Europa League	Q1	Runavík	Faroe Islands	2 July 2009	Tórsvøllur, Tórshavn	3–0	
2009–10	Europa League	Q1	Runavík	Faroe Islands	9 July 2009	Lerkendal Stadion, Trondheim	3–1	
2009–10	Europa League	Q2	Qarabağ	Azerbaijan	16 July 2009	Lerkendal Stadion, Trondheim	0–0	
2009–10	Europa League	Q2	Qarabağ	Azerbaijan	23 July 2009	Tofiq Bahramov Stadium, Baku	0–1	
2010–11	Champions League	Q2	Linfield	Northern Ireland	14 July 2010	Windsor Park, Belfast	0–0	
2010–11	Champions League	Q2	Linfield	Northern Ireland	21 July 2010	Lerkendal Stadion, Trondheim	2–0	
2010–11	Champions League	Q3	AIK	Sweden	28 July 2010	Råsunda Stadium, Stockholm	1–0	
2010–11	Champions League	Q3	AIK	Sweden	4 August 2010	Lerkendal Stadion, Trondheim	3–0	
2010–11	Champions League	PO	Copenhagen	Denmark	17 August 2010	Lerkendal Stadion, Trondheim	2–1	
2010–11	Champions League	PO	Copenhagen	Denmark	25 August 2010	Parken Stadion, Copenhagen	0–1 (a)	
2010–11	Europa League	Group	Bayer Leverkusen	Germany	16 September 2010	BayArena, Leverkusen	0–4	
2010–11	Europa League	Group	Aris	Greece	30 September 2010	Lerkendal Stadion, Trondheim	2–1	
2010–11	Europa League	Group	Atlético Madrid	Spain	21 October 2010	Estadio Vicente Calderón, Madrid	0–3	
2010–11	Europa League	Group	Atlético Madrid	Spain	4 November 2010	Lerkendal Stadion, Trondheim	1–2	
2010–11	Europa League	Group	Bayer Leverkusen	Germany	1 December 2010	Lerkendal Stadion, Trondheim	0–1	
2010–11	Europa League	Group	Aris	Greece	16 December 2010	Kleanthis Vikelidis Stadium, Thessaloniki	0–2	
2011–12	Champions League	Q2	Breiðablik	Iceland	13 July 2011	Lerkendal Stadion, Trondheim	5–0	
2011–12	Champions League	Q2	Breiðablik	Iceland	20 July 2011	Kópavogsvöllur, Kópavogur	0–2	
2011–12	Champions League	Q3	Viktoria Plzeň	Czech Republic	27 July 2011	Lerkendal Stadion, Trondheim	0–1	
2011–12	Champions League	Q3	Viktoria Plzeň	Czech Republic	3 August 2011	Stadion města Plzně, Plzeň	2–3	
2011–12	Europa League	PO	AEK Larnaca	Cyprus	18 August 2011	Lerkendal Stadion, Trondheim	0–0	
2011–12	Europa League	PO	AEK Larnaca	Cyprus	25 August 2011	Antonis Papadopoulos Stadium, Larnaca	1–2	
2012–13	Europa League	Q1	Crusaders	Northern Ireland	5 July 2012	Seaview, Belfast	3–0	
2012–13	Europa League	Q1	Crusaders	Northern Ireland	12 July 2012	Lerkendal Stadion, Trondheim	1–0	
2012–13	Europa League	Q2	Ordabasy	Kazakhstan	19 July 2012	Lerkendal Stadion, Trondheim	2–2	
2012–13	Europa League	Q2	Ordabasy	Kazakhstan	26 July 2012	Kazhimukan Munaitpasov Stadium, Almaty	2–1	
2012–13	Europa League	Q3	Servette	Switzerland	2 August 2012	Stade de Genève, Geneva	1–1	
2012–13	Europa League	Q3	Servette	Switzerland	9 August 2012	Lerkendal Stadion, Trondheim	0–0 (a)	
2012–13	Europa League	PO	Legia Warsaw	Poland	23 August 2012	Polish Army Stadium, Warsaw	1–1	
2012–13	Europa League	PO	Legia Warsaw	Poland	30 August 2012	Lerkendal Stadion, Trondheim	2–1	
2012–13	Europa League	Group	Rapid Wien	Austria	20 September 2012	Ernst-Happel-Stadion, Vienna	2–1	
2012–13	Europa League	Group	Bayer Leverkusen	Germany	4 October 2012	Lerkendal Stadion, Trondheim	0–1	
2012–13	Europa League	Group	Metalist Kharkiv	Ukraine	25 October 2012	Lerkendal Stadion, Trondheim	1–2	
2012–13	Europa League	Group	Metalist Kharkiv	Ukraine	8 November 2012	Metalist Stadium, Kharkiv	1–3	
2012–13	Europa League	Group	Rapid Wien	Austria	22 November 2012	Lerkendal Stadion, Trondheim	3–2	
2012–13	Europa League	Group	Bayer Leverkusen	Germany	6 December 2012	BayArena, Leverkusen	0–1	
2013–14	Europa League	Q1	Crusaders	Northern Ireland	4 July 2013	Seaview, Belfast	2–1	
2013–14	Europa League	Q1	Crusaders	Northern Ireland	11 July 2013	Lerkendal Stadion, Trondheim	7–2	
2013–14	Europa League	Q2	St Johnstone	Scotland	18 July 2013	Lerkendal Stadion, Trondheim	0–1	
2013–14	Europa League	Q2	St Johnstone	Scotland	25 July 2013	McDiarmid Park, Perth	1–1	
2014–15	Europa League	Q1	Jelgava	Latvia	3 July 2014	Lerkendal Stadion, Trondheim	4–0	
2014–15	Europa League	Q1	Jelgava	Latvia	10 July 2014	Olympic Sports Center of Zemgale, Jelgava	2–0	
2014–15	Europa League	Q2	Sligo Rovers	(Republic of Ireland) Ireland	17 July 2014	Lerkendal Stadion, Trondheim	1–2	
2014–15	Europa League	Q2	Sligo Rovers	(Republic of Ireland) Ireland	24 July 2014	The Showgrounds, Sligo	3–1	
2014–15	Europa League	Q3	Karabükspor	Turkey	31 July 2014	Dr. Necmettin Şeyhoğlu Stadium, Karabük	0–0	
2014–15	Europa League	Q3	Karabükspor	Turkey	7 August 2014	Lerkendal Stadion, Trondheim	1–1	
2015–16	Europa League	Q1	Víkingur	Faroe Islands	2 July 2015	Sarpugerði, Norðragøta	2–0	
2015–16	Europa League	Q1	Víkingur	Faroe Islands	9 July 2015	Lerkendal Stadion, Trondheim	0–0	
2015–16	Europa League	Q2	KR	Iceland	16 July 2015	KR-völlur, Iceland	1–0	
2015–16	Europa League	Q2	KR	Iceland	23 July 2015	Lerkendal Stadion, Trondheim	3–0	
2015–16	Europa League	Q3	Debrecen	Hungary	30 July 2015	Nagyerdei Stadion, Debrecen	3–2	
2015–16	Europa League	Q3	Debrecen	Hungary	6 August 2015	Lerkendal Stadion, Trondheim	3–1	
2015–16	Europa League	PO	Steaua București	Romania	20 August 2015	Arena Națională, Bucharest	3–0	
2015–16	Europa League	PO	Steaua București	Romania	27 August 2015	Lerkendal Stadion, Trondheim	0–1	
2015–16	Europa League	Group G	Saint-Étienne	France	17 September 2015	Stade Geoffroy-Guichard, Saint-Étienne	2–2	
2015–16	Europa League	Group G	Dnipro	Ukraine	1 October 2015	Lerkendal Stadion, Trondheim	0–1	
2015–16	Europa League	Group G	Lazio	Italy	22 October 2015	Stadio Olimpico, Rome	1–3	
2015–16	Europa League	Group G	Lazio	Italy	5 November 2015	Lerkendal Stadion, Trondheim	0–2	
2015–16	Europa League	Group G	Saint-Étienne	France	26 November 2015	Lerkendal Stadion, Trondheim	1–1	
2015–16	Europa League	Group G	Dnipro	Ukraine	10 December 2015	Dnipro-Arena, Dnipropetrovsk	0–3	
2016–17	Champions League	Q2	Norrköping	Sweden	13 July 2016	Lerkendal Stadion, Trondheim	3–1	
2016–17	Champions League	Q2	Norrköping	Sweden	20 July 2016	Nya Parken, Norrköping	2–3	
2016–17	Champions League	Q3	APOEL	Cyprus	27 July 2016	Lerkendal Stadion, Trondheim	2–1	
2016–17	Champions League	Q3	APOEL	Cyprus	2 August 2016	GSP Stadium, Nicosia	0–3	
2016–17	Europa League	PO	Austria Wien	Austria	18 August 2016	Ernst Happel Stadium, Vienna	1–2	
2016–17	Europa League	PO	Austria Wien	Austria	25 August 2016	Lerkendal Stadion, Trondheim	1–2	
2017–18	Champions League	Q2	Dundalk	(Republic of Ireland) Ireland	12 July 2017	Oriel Park, Dundalk	1–1	
2017–18	Champions League	Q2	Dundalk	(Republic of Ireland) Ireland	19 July 2017	Lerkendal Stadion, Trondheim	2–1	
2017–18	Champions League	Q3	Celtic	Scotland	26 July 2017	Celtic Park, Glasgow	0–0	
2017–18	Champions League	Q3	Celtic	Scotland	2 August 2017	Lerkendal Stadion, Trondheim	0–1	
2017–18	Europa League	PO	Ajax Amsterdam	Netherlands	17 August 2017	Amsterdam Arena, Amsterdam	1–0	
2017–18	Europa League	PO	Ajax Amsterdam	Netherlands	24 August 2017	Lerkendal Stadion, Trondheim	3–2	
2017–18	Europa League	Group L	Real Sociedad	Spain	14 September 2017	Anoeta Stadium, San Sebastián	0–4	
2017–18	Europa League	Group L	FK Vardar	(North Macedonia) Macedonia	28 September 2017	Lerkendal Stadion, Trondheim	3–1	
2017–18	Europa League	Group L	FC Zenit Saint Petersburg	Russia	19 October 2017	Krestovsky Stadium, Saint Petersburg	1–3	
2017–18	Europa League	Group L	FC Zenit Saint Petersburg	Russia	2 November 2017	Lerkendal Stadion, Trondheim	1–1	
2017–18	Europa League	Group L	Real Sociedad	Spain	23 November 2017	Lerkendal Stadion, Trondheim	0–1	
2017–18	Europa League	Group L	FK Vardar	(North Macedonia) Macedonia	7 December 2017	Philip II Arena, Skopje	1–1	
2018–19	Champions League	Q1	Valur	Iceland	11 July 2018	Hlíðarendi Stadium, Reykjavík	0–1	
2018–19	Champions League	Q1	Valur	Iceland	18 July 2018	Lerkendal Stadion, Trondheim	3–1	
2018–19	Champions League	Q2	Celtic	Scotland	25 July 2018	Celtic Park, Glasgow	1–3	
2018–19	Champions League	Q2	Celtic	Scotland	1 August 2018	Lerkendal Stadion, Trondheim	0–0	
2018–19	Europa League	Q3	Cork City	(Republic of Ireland) Ireland	9 August 2018	Turners Cross, Cork	2–0	
2018–19	Europa League	Q3	Cork City	(Republic of Ireland) Ireland	16 August 2018	Lerkendal Stadion, Trondheim	3–0	
2018–19	Europa League	PO	KF Shkëndija	(North Macedonia) Macedonia	23 August 2018	Lerkendal stadion, Trondheim	3–1	
2018–19	Europa League	PO	KF Shkëndija	(North Macedonia) Macedonia	30 August 2018	Philip II Arena, Skopje	2–0	
2018–19	Europa League	Group B	Celtic	Scotland	20 September 2018	Celtic Park, Glasgow	0–1	
2018–19	Europa League	Group B	RB Leipzig	Germany	4 October 2018	Lerkendal Stadion, Trondheim	1–3	
2018–19	Europa League	Group B	Red Bull Salzburg	Austria	25 October 2018	Red Bull Arena, Salzburg	0–3	
2018–19	Europa League	Group B	Red Bull Salzburg	Austria	8 November 2018	Lerkendal Stadion, Trondheim	2–5	
2018–19	Europa League	Group B	Celtic	Scotland	29 November 2018	Lerkendal Stadion, Trondheim	0–1	
2018–19	Europa League	Group B	RB Leipzig	Germany	13 December 2018	Red Bull Arena, Leipzig	1–1	
2019–20	Champions League	Q1	Linfield	Northern Ireland	10 July 2019	Windsor Park, Belfast	2–0	
2019–20	Champions League	Q1	Linfield	Northern Ireland	17 July 2019	Lerkendal Stadion, Trondheim	4–0	
2019–20	Champions League	Q2	BATE Borisov	Belarus	24 July 2019	Borisov Arena, Barysaw	1–2	
2019–20	Champions League	Q2	BATE Borisov	Belarus	31 July 2019	Lerkendal Stadion, Trondheim	2–0	
2019–20	Champions League	Q3	Maribor	Slovenia	7 August 2019	Ljudski vrt, Maribor	3–1	
2019–20	Champions League	Q3	Maribor	Slovenia	13 August 2019	Lerkendal Stadion, Trondheim	3–1	
2019–20	Champions League	PO	Dinamo Zagreb	Croatia	21 August 2019	Stadion Maksimir, Zagreb	0–2	
2019–20	Champions League	PO	Dinamo Zagreb	Croatia	27 August 2019	Lerkendal Stadion, Trondheim	1–1	
2019–20	Europa League	Group D	LASK	Austria	19 September 2019	Linzer Stadion, Linz	0–1	
2019–20	Europa League	Group D	PSV Eindhoven	Netherlands	3 October 2019	Lerkendal Stadion, Trondheim	1–4	
2019–20	Europa League	Group D	Sporting CP	Portugal	24 October 2019	Estádio José Alvalade, Lisbon	0–1	
2019–20	Europa League	Group D	Sporting CP	Portugal	7 November 2019	Lerkendal Stadion, Trondheim	0–2	
2019–20	Europa League	Group D	LASK	Austria	28 November 2019	Lerkendal Stadion, Trondheim	1–2	
2019–20	Europa League	Group D	PSV Eindhoven	Netherlands	12 December 2019	Philips Stadion, Eindhoven	1–1	
2020–21	Europa League	Q1	Breiðablik	Iceland	27 August 2020	Lerkendal Stadion, Trondheim	4–2	
2020–21	Europa League	Q2	Ventspils	Latvia	17 September 2020	Ventspils Olimpiskais Stadions, Ventspils	5–1	
2020–21	Europa League	Q3	Alanyaspor	Turkey	24 September 2020	Lerkendal Stadion, Trondheim	1–0	
2020–21	Europa League	PO	PSV Eindhoven	Netherlands	1 October 2020	Lerkendal Stadion, Trondheim	0–2	
2021–22	Conference League	Q2	FH	Iceland	22 July 2021	Kaplakriki, Hafnarfjörður	2–0	
2021–22	Conference League	Q2	FH	Iceland	29 July 2021	Lerkendal Stadion, Trondheim	4–1	
2021–22	Conference League	Q3	Domžale	Slovenia	5 August 2021	Lerkendal Stadion, Trondheim	6–1	
2021–22	Conference League	Q3	Domžale	Slovenia	10 August 2021	Stožice Stadium, Ljubljana	2–1	
2021–22	Conference League	PO	Rennes	France	19 August 2021	Roazhon Park, Rennes	0–2	
2021–22	Conference League	PO	Rennes	France	26 August 2021	Lerkendal Stadion, Trondheim	1–3	
2023–24	Conference League	Q2	Crusaders	Northern Ireland	27 July 2023	Seaview, Belfast	2–2	
2023–24	Conference League	Q2	Crusaders	Northern Ireland	3 August 2023	Lerkendal Stadion, Trondheim	3–2 (a.e.t.)	
2023–24	Conference League	Q3	Heart of Midlothian	Scotland	10 August 2023	Lerkendal Stadion, Trondheim	2–1	
2023–24	Conference League	Q3	Heart of Midlothian	Scotland	17 August 2023	Tynecastle Park, Edinburgh	1–3	
2025–26	Conference League	Q2	Banga	Lithuania	24 July 2025	Lerkendal Stadion, Trondheim	5–0	
2025–26	Conference League	Q2	Banga	Lithuania	31 July 2025	Gargždai Stadium, Gargždai	2–0	
2025–26	Conference League	Q3	Hammarby IF	Sweden	7 August 2025	Lerkendal Stadion, Trondheim	0–0	
2025–26	Conference League	Q3	Hammarby IF	Sweden	14 August 2025	3Arena, Stockholm	1–0	
2025–26	Conference League	PO	Mainz 05	Germany	21 August 2025	Lerkendal Stadion, Trondheim	2–1	
2025–26	Conference League	PO	Mainz 05	Germany	28 August 2025	Mewa Arena, Mainz	1–4	

== By club ==
The following list shows statistics against opposing teams Rosenborg has played three or more matches against in UEFA tournaments. It shows the club and its country, games played (P), won (W), drawn (D) and lost (L), goals for (F) and against (A). Statistics are as of 28th August 2025. The statistics include goals scored during extra time where applicable; in these games, the result given is the result at the end of extra time.

Club	Country	P	W	D	L	F	A
Celtic	Scotland	10	1	2	7	5	12
Crusaders	Northern Ireland	6	5	1	0	18	7
Juventus	Italy	6	0	3	3	3	8
Linfield	Northern Ireland	6	4	2	0	10	1
Porto	Portugal	6	1	1	4	4	8
Real Madrid	Spain	6	1	0	5	5	14
PSV Eindhoven	Netherlands	5	0	1	4	3	10
Ajax Amsterdam	Netherlands	4	2	2	0	5	3
Bayer Leverkusen	Germany	4	0	0	4	0	7
Austria Wien	Austria	4	1	0	3	6	9
Bayern Munich	Germany	4	0	2	2	4	7
Brøndby	Denmark	4	4	0	0	9	5
Deportivo La Coruña	Spain	4	1	1	2	2	5
Dynamo Kyiv	Ukraine	4	0	0	4	3	10
KR Reykjavík	Iceland	4	4	0	0	10	2
Legia Warsaw	Poland	4	2	1	1	8	5
Lyon	France	4	0	1	3	2	9
Olympiacos	Greece	4	2	2	0	11	5
Rapid Wien	Austria	4	2	1	1	9	9
Steaua București	Romania	4	2	1	1	7	4
Panathinaikos	Greece	4	1	1	2	6	5
Red Star Belgrade	(Socialist Federal Republic of Yugoslavia) Yugoslavia	4	1	1	2	2	7
Zenit Saint Petersburg	Russia	4	0	1	3	3	8
Breiðablik	Iceland	3	2	0	1	9	4
Club Brugge	Belgium	3	1	1	1	4	4
Copenhagen	Denmark	3	1	1	1	3	3
Saint-Étienne	France	3	0	2	1	3	6
Valencia	Spain	3	2	0	1	4	4
Ventspils	Latvia	3	3	0	0	15	2

== UEFA club coefficient ==
Season	Rank	Change	Points	Ref
1965/66	112	New	1.000	
1966/67	125	▼13	1.000	
1967/68	128	▼3	1.000	
1968/69	103	▲25	1.500	
1969/70	71	▲32	2.500	
1970/71	107	▼36	1.500	
1971/72	57	▲50	3.000	
1972/73	63	▼6	3.000	
1973/74	71	▼8	2.500	
1974/75	112	▼41	1.500	
1975/76	111	▲1	1.500	
1986/87	195	New	0.750	
1987/88	200	▼5	0.750	
1988/89	195	▲5	0.750	
1989/90	139	▲56	1.250	
1990/91	86	▲53	2.250	
1991/92	111	▼25	1.500	
1992/93	71	▲40	2.500	
1993/94	48	▲23	3.500	
1994/95	41	▲7	4.000	
1995/96	42	▼1	3.833	
1996/97	24	▲18	4.958	
1997/98	20	▲20	5.458	
1998/99	39	▼19	41.866	
1999/00	35	▲4	51.050	
2000/01	35	–	53.800	
2001/02	49	▼14	47.737	
2002/03	62	▼13	42.787	
2003/04	48	▲14	42.226	
2004/05	58	▼10	36.665	
2005/06	65	▼7	35.921	
2006/07	80	▼15	31.509	
2007/08	72	▲8	35.400	
2008/09	71	▲1	28.760	
2009/10	87	▼16	23.980	
2010/11	101	▼14	19.375	
2011/12	91	▲10	20.935	
2012/13	109	▼18	16.835	
2013/14	149	▼40	11.355	
2014/15	146	▲3	11.875	
2015/16	136	▲10	12.850	
2016/17	138	▼2	12.665	
2017/18	135	▲3	9.000	
2018/19	116	▲19	11.500	
2019/20	110	▲6	13.500	
2020/21	109	▲1	14.000	
2021/22	104	▲5	15.000	
2022/23	134	▼30	11.000	
2023/24	143	▼9	10.000	
2024/25	189	▼46	7.937	
2025/26	200	▼11	8.247	
