= Sverre Fornes =

Norwegian footballer (1932–2021)

Personal information
- Date of birth: 25 April 1932
- Place of birth: Trondheim, Norway
- Date of death: 16 September 2021 (aged 89)
- Place of death: Trondheim, Norway
- Position: Goalkeeper

Senior career*
| Years | Team | Apps | (Gls) |
| 1948–1965 | Rosenborg | 68 | (0) |

International career
| 1960 | Norway B | 2 | (0) |
- * Club domestic league appearances and goals

Sverre Fornes (25 April 1932 – 16 September 2021) was a Norwegian footballer who played goalkeeper for Rosenborg BK between 1948 and 1965. He also played two matches for Norway B in 1960. He became Norwegian Football Cup champion twice, in 1960 and 1964.

There are no official statistics for the number of Fornes' matches, but an unofficial counting of 500 was made public before his last match in 1965. He also played for Rosenborg's handball team and its ice hockey team, Rosenborg IHK.
