= Birger Tingstad =

Norwegian footballer (1939-2012)

Birger Tingstad (12 December 1939 – 25 December 2012) was a Norwegian football midfielder.

He played for Rosenborg BK from the late 1950s to 1970, amassing 179 competitive games and 40 goals. He helped win the Norwegian Football Cup in 1960 and 1964 as well as the 1967 Norwegian First Division (highest tier). Tingstad also played ice hockey for Rosenborg.
