= 1964 Norwegian First Division =

20th season of top-tier football league in Norway

1. divisjon
- Season: 1964
- Dates: 24 April – 4 October
- Champions: Lyn; 1st title
- Relegated: Brann; Raufoss
- European Cup: Lyn (both 1964–65 and 1965–66)
- Cup Winners' Cup: Rosenborg
- Matches played: 90
- Goals scored: 257 (2.86 per match)
- Top goalscorer: Ole Stavrum (18 goals)
- Biggest home win: Fredrikstad 9–1 Raufoss (27 September 1964)
- Biggest away win: Brann 0–7 Lyn (8 August 1964)
- Highest scoring: Fredrikstad 9–1 Raufoss (27 September 1964)
- Longest winning run: Lyn (6 games)
- Longest unbeaten run: Lyn (11 games)
- Longest winless run: Skeid (8 games)
- Longest losing run: Raufoss (6 games)
- Highest attendance: 16,500; Brann 2–0 Sarpsborg FK (2 September 1964)
- Lowest attendance: 1,786; Skeid 1–1 Frigg (19 June 1964)
- Average attendance: 6,186 ▼21.4%

The 1964 1. divisjon was the 20th completed season of top division football in Norway.

== Overview ==
It was contested by 10 teams, and FC Lyn Oslo won their first championship title. At the time, Lyn Oslo's 26 points were a record for the most points in one season. Brann and Raufoss were relegated to the 2. divisjon.

This season, two spots in the European Cup were awarded. Lyn lead the league after 9 rounds and qualified for the 1964–65 European Cup. At the end of the season, Lyn won the league, their first league title, and qualified also for the 1965–66 European Cup. This was the last Norwegian top flight season, the leader after half a season were awarded a European Cup spot.

== Teams and locations ==
Note: Table lists in alphabetical order.

Team	Ap.	Location
Brann	15	Bergen
Fredrikstad	19	Fredrikstad
Frigg	9	Oslo
Lyn	12	Oslo
Raufoss	7	Raufoss
Sandefjord BK	17	Sandefjord
Sarpsborg FK	14	Sarpsborg
Skeid	18	Oslo
Vålerengen	15	Oslo
Viking	19	Stavanger

== League table ==
Pos	Team	Pld	W	D	L	GF	GA	GD	Pts	Qualification or relegation
1	Lyn (C)	18	10	6	2	39	16	+23	26	Qualification for the first round of the 1964–65 European Cup and the 1965–66 European Cup
2	Fredrikstad	18	9	6	3	40	21	+19	24	
3	Sarpsborg FK	18	10	3	5	30	16	+14	23	
4	Frigg	18	6	8	4	28	29	−1	20	
5	Skeid	18	5	7	6	24	22	+2	17	
6	Vålerengen	18	6	5	7	18	21	−3	17	Qualification for the Inter-Cities Fairs Cup
7	Sandefjord BK	18	6	5	7	17	23	−6	17	
8	Viking	18	5	4	9	22	37	−15	14	
9	Brann (R)	18	3	6	9	17	32	−15	12	Relegation to Second Division
10	Raufoss (R)	18	3	4	11	22	40	−18	10	Relegation to Second Division

Source: NIFS
Rules for classification: 1) points; 2) goal difference; 3) number of goals scored.
(C) Champions; (R) Relegated

== Results ==
Home \ Away	SKB	FFK	FRI	LYN	RAU	SBK	SFK	SKD	VIK	VIF
Brann		0–2	3–3	0–7	0–1	3–1	2–0	2–2	5–0	1–1
Fredrikstad	4–0		2–2	0–2	9–1	2–1	2–1	1–1	4–2	0–1
Frigg	0–0	1–1		0–6	2–1	0–2	2–0	2–1	4–3	3–1
Lyn	4–1	1–2	2–2		2–1	1–1	1–0	3–2	2–1	2–3
Raufoss	0–0	4–4	0–3	0–2		3–0	1–4	1–3	0–0	1–2
Sandefjord BK	1–0	0–0	1–1	1–1	3–1		1–2	1–0	1–3	2–0
Sarpsborg	1–0	3–1	1–0	0–0	3–2	4–0		1–0	4–1	0–0
Skeid	4–0	1–1	1–1	0–1	1–4	0–0	0–0		3–1	3–2
Viking	1–0	0–2	1–1	2–2	1–0	2–0	1–6	1–1		1–0
Vålerengen	0–0	0–3	3–1	0–0	1–1	0–1	2–0	0–1	2–1	

Source: NIFS.no
Legend: Blue = home team win; Yellow = draw; Red = away team win.

== Season statistics ==
=== Top scorer ===
- (Norway) Ole Stavrum, Lyn – 18 goals

=== Attendance ===
Pos	Team	Total	High	Low	Average	Change
1	Brann	113,300	16,500	6,000	12,589	−19.6%
2	Viking	70,493	14,000	4,250	7,833	+4.7%
3	Vålerengen	67,870	11,903	4,035	7,541	−23.1%
4	Lyn	63,249	14,127	2,745	7,028	−5.8%
5	Skeid	61,786	11,159	1,786	6,865	−24.3%
6	Fredrikstad	45,060	11,500	2,300	5,007	−28.3%
7	Sarpsborg FK	38,486	9,326	2,400	4,276	−9.6%
8	Frigg	38,478	7,149	2,789	4,275	−35.1%
9	Raufoss	32,100	5,000	2,000	3,567	n/a^{2}
10	Sandefjord BK	25,877	5,125	2,100	2,875	n/a^{2}
	League total	556,699	16,500	1,786	6,186	−21.4%

Source: nifs.no
Notes:
2: Team played last season in 2. divisjon.
