= 1965 Norwegian First Division =

21st season of top-tier football league in Norway

1. divisjon
- Season: 1965
- Dates: 23 April – 10 October
- Champions: Vålerengen; 1st title
- Relegated: Viking; Sandefjord BK
- European Cup: Vålerengen
- Cup Winners' Cup: Skeid
- Inter-Cities Fairs Cup: Frigg
- Matches: 90
- Goals: 307 (3.41 per match)
- Top goalscorer: Harald Berg (19 goals)
- Biggest home win: Fredrikstad 6–0 Sarpsborg FK (17 August 1965)
- Biggest away win: Sandefjord 1–8 Lyn (4 August 1965)
- Highest scoring: Fredrikstad 7–3 Skeid (17 August 1965)
- Longest winning run: Sarpsborg FK (6 games)
- Longest unbeaten run: Fredrikstad; Frigg; Sarpsborg FK; Vålerengen (7 games)
- Longest winless run: Sandefjord BK (18 games)
- Longest losing run: Sandefjord BK (9 games)
- Highest attendance: 17,063; Lyn 2–2 Vålerengen (14 May 1965)
- Lowest attendance: 400; Sandefjord 2–4 Sarpsborg (3 October 1965)
- Average attendance: 5,034 ▼18.6%

The 1965 1. divisjon was the 21st completed season of top division football in Norway.

== Overview ==
The season was contested by 10 teams, and Vålerengen won their first championship.

Vålerenga's 27 points was at the time a record for most points in a season, one more than Lyn achieved in the previous season. Viking and Sandefjord BK were relegated to the 2. divisjon.

== Teams and locations ==
Note: Table lists in alphabetical order.

Team	Ap.	Location
Fredrikstad	20	Fredrikstad
Frigg	10	Oslo
Lyn	13	Oslo
Odd	16	Skien
Sandefjord BK	18	Sandefjord
Sarpsborg FK	15	Sarpsborg
Skeid	19	Oslo
Steinkjer	7	Steinkjer
Vålerengen	16	Oslo
Viking	20	Stavanger

== League table ==
Pos	Team	Pld	W	D	L	GF	GA	GD	Pts	Qualification or relegation
1	Vålerengen (C)	18	12	3	3	39	25	+14	27	Qualification for the European Cup first round
2	Lyn	18	12	2	4	57	22	+35	26	
3	Sarpsborg FK	18	10	3	5	32	24	+8	23	
4	Steinkjer	18	9	3	6	27	21	+6	21	
5	Fredrikstad	18	8	4	6	40	31	+9	20	
6	Skeid	18	8	1	9	28	30	−2	17	Qualification for the Cup Winners' Cup first round
7	Odd	18	7	2	9	30	35	−5	16	
8	Frigg	18	5	5	8	22	30	−8	15	Qualification for the Inter-Cities Fairs Cup first round
9	Viking (R)	18	5	3	10	20	32	−12	13	Relegation to Second Division
10	Sandefjord BK (R)	18	0	2	16	12	57	−45	2	Relegation to Second Division

Source: NIFS
Rules for classification: 1) points; 2) goal difference; 3) number of goals scored.
(C) Champions; (R) Relegated

== Results ==
Home \ Away	FFK	FRI	LYN	ODD	SBK	SRP	SKD	STN	VIK	VIF
Fredrikstad		4–3	2–2	2–1	3–0	6–0	7–3	0–1	1–1	2–2
Frigg	1–0		1–0	1–1	3–0	3–3	0–3	0–1	2–1	1–2
Lyn	3–1	4–0		5–0	5–1	1–0	2–1	2–3	3–1	2–2
Odd	4–0	2–0	3–2		5–1	1–1	0–1	0–2	2–0	1–2
Sandefjord BK	0–6	2–2	1–8	1–2		2–4	0–2	1–1	1–3	0–2
Sarpsborg	0–0	2–0	3–0	3–0	3–0		1–2	2–1	1–0	2–1
Skeid	2–3	0–1	1–5	3–4	1–0	1–3		1–0	4–0	1–0
Steinkjer	1–2	0–0	1–4	5–0	2–0	3–0	2–1		3–1	0–0
Viking	3–0	2–2	0–2	3–2	2–1	0–2	1–1	2–0		0–1
Vålerengen	4–1	3–2	1–7	3–2	3–1	3–2	1–0	5–1	4–0	

Source: NIFS.no
Legend: Blue = home team win; Yellow = draw; Red = away team win.

== Season statistics ==
=== Top scorer ===
- (Norway) Harald Berg, Lyn – 19 goals

=== Attendances ===
Pos	Team	Total	High	Low	Average	Change
1	Lyn	71,083	17,063	2,900	7,898	+12.4%
2	Vålerengen	64,336	14,580	3,350	7,148	−5.2%
3	Viking	54,969	8,035	3,805	6,108	−22.0%
4	Skeid	54,102	11,500	2,347	6,011	−12.4%
4	Frigg	51,071	10,214	2,292	5,675	+32.7%
6	Steinkjer	44,500	7,500	2,000	4,944	n/a^{2}
7	Sarpsborg FK	35,070	9,000	1,200	3,897	−8.9%
8	Fredrikstad	32,451	7,704	1,246	3,606	−28.0%
9	Odd	30,562	5,198	1,574	3,396	n/a^{2}
10	Sandefjord BK	14,900	3,000	400	1,656	−42.4%
	League total	453,044	17,063	400	5,034	−18.6%

Source: nifs.no
Notes:
2: Team played last season in 2. divisjon.
