= Martin Kjølholdt =

Norwegian footballer (1938-1989)

Martin Kjølholdt (22 January 1938 – 12 April 1989) was a Norwegian footballer. He played for Sarpsborg FK most of his career, and was capped twice for Norway. He left the club ahead of the 1969 season to become player-coach for Rygge IL. Kjølholdt has also chaired Sarpsborg BK.
