= Finland national football team results (1911–1939) =

This article provides details of international football games played by the Finland national football team from 1911 to 1939.

They competed in the 1912 Summer Olympics in Stockholm, where they pulled off two major upsets by beating Italy and the Russian Empire, but losing the bronze medal match against the Netherlands. Finland had to wait for over two decades to participate in another major tournament, the 1936 Summer Olympics, where they got knocked-out in the first round by Peru. In the following year, in 1937, Finland participated in the FIFA World Cup qualification for the first time, losing all three matches to Sweden, Germany, and Estonia. Notable figures during these years were Verner Eklöf, Aulis Koponen, and Gunnar Åström, who all scored at least 16 goals between 1919 and 1937.

== Results ==
=== 1911 ===
22 October Friendly	Finland (Russian Empire)	2–5	Sweden	Eläintarha Stadium, Helsinki
	Lindbäck 3'; Jerima 5'		Ericsson 40'; Persson 46'; Brolin 65', 86'; Andersson 88'	Attendance: 1,000; Referee: Arve Eerikäinen (Finland)

=== 1912 ===
27 June Friendly	Sweden	7–1	Finland	Solna, Sweden
20:00 (UTC+1:00)	Lorichs 1', 50', 65'; Dahlström 52', 87'; Persson 80', 88'	Report	Wiberg 38'	Stadium: Råsunda IP; Attendance: 3,000; Referee: Hugo Meisl (Austria)

29 June 1912 Summer Olympics; First round	Finland	3–2 (a.e.t.)	Italy	Stockholm, Sweden
11:00 CET (UTC+01:00)	Öhman 2'; Soinio 40'; Wiberg 105'	Report	Bontadini 10'; Sardi 25'	Stadium: Tranebergs Idrottsplats; Attendance: 600; Referee: Hugo Meisl (Austria)

30 June 1912 Summer Olympics; Quarter-finals	Finland	2–1 (a.e.t.)	Russia	Stockholm
10:00 CET (UTC+01:00)	Wiberg 30'; Öhman 80'	Report; Report	Butusov 72'	Stadium: Tranebergs Idrottsplats; Attendance: 200; Referee: Per Sjoblom (Sweden)

2 July 1912 Summer Olympics Semi-finals	England Amateurs; Great Britain	4–0	Finland	Stockholm, Sweden
15:00 (UTC+1:00)	Holopainen 2' (o.g.); Walden 7', 77'; Knight (penalty missed); Woodward 82'	Report		Stadium: Olympic Stadium; Attendance: 4,000; Referee: Ruben Gelbord (Sweden)

4 July 1912 Summer Olympics Bronze Medal match	Netherlands	9–0	Finland	Solna, Stockholm, Sweden
15:00	Vos 29', 43', 46', 74', 78' van der Sluis 24', 57' de Groot 28', 86'	Report		Stadium: Råsunda; Attendance: 1,000; Referee: Per Sjoblom (Sweden)

=== 1914 ===
24 May Friendly	Sweden	4–3	Finland	Solna, Sweden
14:00 (UTC+1:00)	Bergström 22'; Swensson 59', 82'; Gunnarsson 85'	Report	Schybergson 35', 62'; Johansson 48'	Stadium: Råsunda IP; Attendance: 2,000; Referee: August Heiberg Kahrs (Norway)

=== 1919 ===
29 May Friendly	Sweden	1–0	Finland	Stockholm, Sweden
13:30 (UTC+1:00)	Svedberg 71' (pen.)	Report		Stadium: Stockholm Olympic Stadium; Attendance: 8,000; Referee: Hagbard Vestergaard (Denmark)

28 September Friendly	Finland	3–3	Sweden	Helsinki, Finland
13:00 (UTC+1:40)	Wickström 22', 37'; Thorn 75'	Report	Kock 78', 88'; Arontzon 83'	Stadium: Töölön Pallokenttä; Attendance: 4,500; Referee: Hagbard Vestergaard (Denmark)

== 1920s ==
=== 1920 ===
30 May Friendly	Sweden	1–0	Finland	Stockholm, Sweden
14:00 (UTC+1:00)	Dahl 38', 69'; Krantz 75', 76'	Report		Stadium: Stockholm Olympic Stadium; Attendance: 10,000; Referee: Paul Putz (Belgium)

19 September Friendly	Finland	1–0	Sweden	Helsinki, Finland
14:00 (UTC+1:40)	Öhman 36'	Report		Stadium: Töölön Pallokenttä; Attendance: 4,500; Referee: Thorvald Johnson (Norway)

17 October Friendly	Finland	6–0	Estonia	Helsinki, Finland
13:00 UTC+2	Öhman 5'; Eklöf 10', 80'; Österholm 15'; Tanner 35', 70'	Report1; Report2		Stadium: Töölön Pallokenttä; Attendance: 2,500; Referee: Kaarlo Soinio (Finland)

=== 1921 ===
25 May Friendly	Norway	3–2	Finland	Kristiania, Norway
19:00 (UTC+1); Match 42	Berstad 30', 43'; Paulsen 48'	Report	Eklöf 15'; Mantila 31'	Stadium: Gressbanen; Attendance: 14,000; Referee: Ernst Albihn (Sweden)

29 May Friendly	Sweden	0–3	Finland	Stockholm, Sweden
13:30 (UTC+1:00)	Öhman 10'; Kelin 28', 89'	Report		Stadium: Stockholm Olympic Stadium; Attendance: 12,000; Referee: Lauritz Andersen (Denmark)

31 July Friendly	Finland	2–3	Austria	Helsinki, Finland
	Mantila 26'; Blum 65' (o.g.)	Report	Uridil 47', 80'; Neumann 68'	Stadium: Töölön Pallokenttä; Attendance: 8,000; Referee: Wolf Boas (Netherlands)

28 August Friendly	Estonia	0–3	Finland	Tallinn, Estonia
18:00 UTC+2		Report1; Report2	Grannas 3'; Hirvonen 9'; Eklöf 78' (pen.)	Stadium: Tiigiveski Spordiplats; Attendance: 2,500; Referee: Bengt Sjöström (Finland)

18 September Friendly	Finland	3–3	Germany	Helsinki, Finland
13:00 (UTC+2:00)	Eklöf 12'; Thorn 54'; Öhman 88'	Report	Herberger 5', 66'; Kalb 7'	Stadium: Töölön Pallokenttä; Attendance: 8,000; Referee: Gösta Björk (Sweden)

=== 1922 ===
5 June Friendly	Finland	1–4	Sweden	Helsinki, Finland
18:00 (UTC+2:00)	Katajavuori 20'	Report	Edlund 5', 47'; Kaufeldt 10', 73'	Stadium: Töölön Pallokenttä; Attendance: 5,000; Referee: Hugo Meisl (Austria)

13 July Friendly	Finland	1–5	Hungary	Helsinki, Finland
18:30 (UTC+2:00)	Kelin 56'	Report	Schwarz 22', 83'; Fogl 64'; Pataki 69', 81'	Stadium: Töölön Pallokenttä; Attendance: 5,000; Referee: Artur Björklund (Sweden)

11 August Friendly	Finland	10–2	Estonia	Helsinki, Finland
18:30 UTC+2	Mantila 4', 85'; Öhman 10', 15' (pen.), 37', 46', 55', 59'; Eklöf 52', 58'; Mantila 85'	Report1; Report2	Kuulmann 40'; Tell 42'	Stadium: Töölön Pallokenttä; Attendance: 2,000; Referee: Gösta Löfgren (Finland)

26 August Friendly	Finland	1–3	Norway	Helsinki, Finland
17:30 (UTC+2); Match 47	Eklöf 60'	Report	Nielsen 38'; Strøm 43'; Gundersen 85'	Stadium: Töölön Pallokenttä; Attendance: 5,000; Referee: Eric Gustavsson (Sweden)

=== 1923 ===
17 June Friendly	Norway	3–0	Finland	Kristiania, Norway
12:30 (UTC+1); Match 50	Strøm 29', 60'; Johnsen 75'	Report		Stadium: Gressbanen; Attendance: 12,000; Referee: John Fowler (England)

29 May Friendly	Sweden	5–4	Finland	Gävle, Sweden
19:15 (UTC+1:00)	Rydell 1'; Paulsson 31', 48', 64'; Carlsson 37'	Report	Kelin 4'; Linna 20', 54'; Eklöf 66'	Stadium: Strömvallen; Attendance: 4,055; Referee: Peco Bauwens (Germany)

12 August Friendly	Germany	1–2	Finland	Dresden, Germany
16:00 (UTC+1:00)	Claus-Oehler 31'	Report	Müller 10' (o.g.); Linna 27'	Stadium: Dresdner Kampfbahn; Attendance: 25,000; Referee: Job Mutters (Netherlands)

15 August Friendly	Austria	2–1	Finland	Vienna, Austria
	Wieser 5', 75'	Report	Eklöf 42'	Stadium: Hohe Warte Stadium; Attendance: 35,000; Referee: František Cejnar (Czechoslovakia)

19 August Friendly	Hungary	3–1	Finland	Budapest, Hungary
17:00 (UTC+1:00)	Braun 50' (pen.), 53'; Hirzer 86'	Report	Linna 37'	Stadium: Üllői úti stadion Attendance: 16,000; Referee: Max Seemann (Austria)

23 September Friendly	Finland	5–3	Poland	Helsinki, Finland
	Eklöf 15', 37'; Linna 23'; Korma 60', 70'	Report	Staliński 37', 80'; Müller 83'	Stadium: Töölön Pallokenttä; Attendance: 3,000; Referee: August Silber-Sillak (Estonia)

30 September Friendly	Estonia	2–1	Finland	Tallinn, Estonia
15:00 UTC+2	Tell 24'; Joll 84'	Report1; Report2	Österlund 67'	Stadium: Spordi Staadion; Attendance: 4,000; Referee: Julius Reinans (Estonia)

=== 1924 ===
17 June Friendly	Finland	2–4	Turkey	Helsinki, Finland
	Kelin 28'; Fallström 86'	Report	3', 15', 37', 87' Sporel	Stadium: Töölön Pallokenttä; Attendance: 6,000; Referee: Gösta Löfgren (Finland)

28 July Friendly	Finland	5–7	Sweden	Helsinki, Finland
19:00 (UTC+2:00)	Fallström 8', 15'; Eklöf 25'; Koponen 29'; Karjagin 42'	Report	Haglund 18', 89'; Kock 35' (pen.), 77' (pen.), 84' (pen.); Karlsson 65', 70'	Stadium: Töölön Pallokenttä; Attendance: 3,500; Referee: Julius Reinans (Estonia)

10 August Friendly	Poland	1–0	Finland	Legia, Poland
17:00	Reyman 59'	Report		Stadium: Stadion Agrykola; Attendance: 4,000; Referee: Mihály Iváncsics (Hungary)

14 August Friendly	Latvia	0–2	Finland	Riga, Latvia
18:00	Fallström 13'; Koponen 26'	Report		Stadium: LSB Stadions; Attendance: 4,000; Referee: Heinrich Plhak (Austria)

23 August Friendly	Finland	2–0	Norway	Helsinki, Finland
17:50 (UTC+2); Match 57	Kanerva 34'; Fallström 42'	Report		Stadium: Töölön Pallokenttä; Attendance: 3,000; Referee: Ruben Gelbord (Sweden)

14 September Friendly	Finland	4–0	Estonia	Helsinki, Finland
13:30 UTC+2	Kanerva 20'; Soinio 50'; Koponen 65', 85'	Report1; Report2		Stadium: Töölön Pallokenttä; Attendance: 4,000; Referee: Axel Bergqvist (Sweden)

=== 1925 ===
7 June Friendly	Norway	1–0	Finland	Oslo, Norway
12:30 (UTC+1); Match 60	Olsen 86'	Report		Stadium: Gressbanen; Attendance: 12,000; Referee: Axel Bergqvist (Sweden)

9 June Friendly	Sweden	4–0	Finland	Gothenburg, Sweden
19:15 (UTC+1:00)	Johansson 8', 23', 72' (pen.), 85'	Report		Stadium: Slottsskogsvallen; Attendance: 7,500; Referee: Ragnvald Smedvik (Germany)

26 June Friendly	Finland	3–5	Germany	Helsinki, Finland
19:00 (UTC+2:00)	Kelin 28'; Koponen 50' (pen.), 83'	Report	Pömpner 52', 71', 79'; Ruch 75' (pen.); Voß 87'	Stadium: Töölön Pallokenttä; Attendance: 3,500; Referee: Sigfrid Benzer (Sweden)

5 July Friendly	Estonia	2–0	Finland	Tallinn, Estonia
19:00 UTC+2	Pihlak 20', 45' (pen.)	Report1; Report2		Stadium: Kalevi staadion Attendance: 3,000; Referee: Imre Józsa (Hungary)

10 July Friendly	Finland	1–2	Austria	Helsinki, Finland
	Eklöf 4' (pen.)	Report	Dumser 40'; Wesely 50'	Stadium: Töölön Pallokenttä; Attendance: 4,000; Referee: Axel Bergqvist (Sweden)

9 August Friendly	Finland	3–1	Latvia	Helsinki, Finland
18:00 (UTC+2); Match 57	Eklöf 74'; Fallström 79', 85'	Report	Tauriņš 72'	Stadium: Töölön Pallokenttä; Attendance: 2,000; Referee: Theodor Malm (Sweden)

30 August Friendly	Finland	2–2	Poland	Helsinki, Finland
15:00 (UTC+1:00)	Linna 40'; Kulmala 85'	Report	Staliński 57'; Kałuża 60'	Stadium: Tölö bollplan Attendance: 2,500; Referee: Trygve Høgberg (Norway)

27 September Friendly	Denmark	3–3	Finland	Aarhus, Denmark
14:00 (UTC+1)	Kelin 18' (o.g.); Jørgensen 61', 67'	Report	Eklöf 24', 35'; Koponen 41'	Stadium: Aarhus Stadium; Attendance: 15,000; Referee: Job Mutters (Netherlands)

=== 1926 ===
6 June Friendly	Finland	2–5	Norway	Helsinki, Finland
18:00 (UTC+2); Match 63	Kanerva 70', 85'	Report	Gundersen 13', 75', 89'; Jacobsen 56'; Andersen 60'	Stadium: Töölön Pallokenttä; Attendance: 4,000; Referee: Knut Lundstedt (Sweden)

20 June Friendly	Finland	3–2	Denmark	Helsinki, Finland
18:00 (UTC+2)	Lönnberg 6'; Kelin 37'; Lönnberg 70'	Report	Petersen 12'; Bøge 16'	Stadium: Tölö bollplan Attendance: 5,000; Referee: Gustaf Ekberg (Sweden)

26 July Friendly	Finland	2–3	Sweden	Helsinki, Finland
18:15 (UTC+2:00)	Kanerva 5'; Saario 28'	Report	Hedström 62', 82'; Sundberg 84'	Stadium: Töölön Pallokenttä; Attendance: 4,000; Referee: Peco Bauwens (Germany)

12 August Friendly	Latvia	1–4	Finland	Riga, Latvia
18:30	Strazdiņš 87'	Report	Koponen 13', 20'; Silve 25'; Lönnberg 74'	Stadium: LSB Stadions; Attendance: 4,000; Referee: August Silber (Estonia)

5 September Friendly	Finland	1–1	Estonia	Helsinki, Finland
12:30 UTC+2	Saario 70'	Report1; Report2	Koskinen 36' (o.g.)	Stadium: Töölön Pallokenttä; Attendance: 3,000; Referee: Elias Englund (Sweden)

=== 1927 ===
12 June Friendly	Sweden	6–2	Finland	Stockholm, Sweden
13:15 (UTC+1:00)	Hallbäck 24', 88'; Kaufeldt 33'; Johansson 71', 85'; Dahl 79'	Report	Åström 73', 87'	Stadium: Stockholm Olympic Stadium; Attendance: 17,000; Referee: Ragnvald Smedvik (Germany)

15 June Friendly	Norway	3–1	Finland	Aker, Norway
19:30 (UTC+1); Match 68	Møller 24'; Strøm 47'; Berstad 63'	Report	Åström 54'	Stadium: Ullevaal Stadion; Attendance: 16,000; Referee: Arthur Björklund (Sweden)

10 August Friendly	Estonia	2–1	Finland	Tallinn, Estonia
18:30 UTC+2	Pihlak 11'; Joll 59'	Report1; Report2	Kulmala 52'	Stadium: Kadriorg Stadium; Attendance: 5,000; Referee: Axel Bergqvist (Sweden)

11 September Friendly	Finland	3–1	Latvia	Helsinki, Finland
13:00 (UTC+2); Match 57	Koponen 40'; Lauks 41' (o.g.); Fallström 74'	Report	Šeibelis 49'	Stadium: Töölön Pallokenttä; Attendance: 2,500; Referee: Heinrich Paal (Estonia)

=== 1928 ===
3 June Friendly	Finland	0–6	Norway	Helsinki, Finland
14:30 (UTC+2); Match 72		Report	E. Andersen 4', 16'; Gundersen 32', 52'; S. Andersen 61'; Helgesen 62'	Stadium: Töölön Pallokenttä; Attendance: 6,000; Referee: Ragnar Bäckström (Sweden)

12 August Friendly	Finland	2–2	Estonia	Helsinki, Finland
13:00 UTC+2	Åström 30'; Kanerva 63'	Report1; Report2	Paal 41', 74'	Stadium: Töölön Pallokenttä; Attendance: 3,000; Referee: Alf Hillerström (Sweden)

19 August Friendly	Latvia	2–1	Finland	Riga, Latvia
17:00	Pavlovs 62', 87'	Report	Lönnberg 90' (pen.)	Stadium: LSB Stadions; Attendance: 1,000; Referee: Heinrich Paal (Estonia)

2 September Friendly	Finland	2–3	Sweden	Helsinki, Finland
13:00 (UTC+2:00)	Malmgren 60'; Kanerva 77'	Report	Bergström 3'; Andersson 8', 79'	Stadium: Töölön Pallokenttä; Attendance: 5,000; Referee: Karl August Andersen (Norway)

=== 1929 ===
14 June 1929–32 Nordic Championship	Sweden	3–1	Finland	Stockholms Stadion, Stockholm
19:15 (UTC+1:00)	Lundahl 38' (pen.), 44'; Holmberg 76'	Report	Koponen 75'	Attendance: 16,982; Referee: Frederik Schieldrop (Norway)

18 June 1929–32 Nordic Championship	Norway	4–0	Finland	Aker, Norway
19:30 (UTC+1); Match 77	Juve 8', 15', 73'; Er. Andersen 30'	Report		Stadium: Ullevaal Stadion; Attendance: 12,000; Referee: Carl Olsson (Sweden)

25 July Friendly	Estonia	1–1	Finland	Tallinn, Estonia
19:00 UTC+2	Koponen 10'	Report1; Report2	Kull 17'	Stadium: Kadriorg Stadium; Attendance: 3,000; Referee: Gustaf Ekberg (Sweden)

27 August Friendly	Finland	2–1	Estonia	Helsinki, Finland
17:45 UTC+1	Lönnberg 15' (pen.); Koponen 57'	Report1; Report2	Pihlak 49'	Stadium: Töölön Pallokenttä; Attendance: 3,000; Referee: Osborn Wenzel (Sweden)

15 September Friendly	Finland	3–1	Latvia	Helsinki, Finland
13:00 (UTC+2); Match 57	Svanström 10'; Närvänen 13'; Suontausta 17'	Report	Pētersons 43'	Stadium: Töölön Pallokenttä; Attendance: 4,000; Referee: Axel Bergqvist (Sweden)

13 October 1929–32 Nordic Championship	Denmark	8–0	Finland	Copenhagen, Denmark
13:30 (UTC+1)	Jørgensen 11', 41', 73'; Hansen 30', 34'; Uldaler 61'; Eriksen 70'; Rohde 87'	Report		Stadium: Idrætsparken; Attendance: 20,000; Referee: Moritz Fuchs (Germany)

20 October Friendly	Germany	4–0	Finland	Altona, Germany
15:00 (UTC+1:00)	Szepan 52'; Sackenheim 61', 81'; Hofmann 70'	Report		Stadium: Altonaer Stadion; Attendance: 20,000; Referee: Bjarne Bech (Norway)

== 1930s ==
=== 1930 ===
1 June 1929–32 Nordic Championship	Norway	6–2	Finland	Aker, Norway
13:00 (UTC+1); Match 81	H. Pettersen 12'; Juve 17', 42', 66'; M. Pettersen 30', 88'	Report	Saario 66'; Åström 82'	Stadium: Ullevaal Stadion; Attendance: 13,000; Referee: Otto Remke (Denmark)

16 June 1929–32 Nordic Championship	Finland	1–6	Denmark	Tölö bollplan, Helsinki
19:00 (UTC+2:00)	Kanerva 88'	Report	Hansen 1'; Kleven 13'; Uldaler 17', 50'; Eriksen 60'; Jørgensen 63'	Attendance: 6,000; Referee: Carl Olsson (Sweden)

4 August Friendly	Latvia	3–0	Finland	Riga, Latvia
18:00	Pētersons 4'; Pavlovs 46'; Dambrēvics 69'	Report		Stadium: LSB Stadions; Attendance: 3,000; Referee: Georg Muntau (Germany)

6 August Friendly	Estonia	4–0	Finland	Tallinn, Estonia
18:00 UTC+2	Karm 21', 86'; Brenner 42', 67'	Report1; Report2		Stadium: Kadriorg Stadium; Attendance: 3,000; Referee: Gustavs Kruminš (Latvia)

28 September 1929–32 Nordic Championship	Finland	4–4	Sweden	Tölö bollplan, Helsinki
13:00 (UTC+2:00)	Lehtinen 9', 40', 41'; Koponen 15'	Report	Karlsson 26', 53', 64'; Andersson 60'	Attendance: 7,152; Referee: Otto Remke (Denmark)

=== 1931 ===
17 June Friendly	Finland	3–1	Estonia	Helsinki, Finland
19:00 UTC+2	Strömsten 2'; Åström 36', 44'	Report1; Report2	Räästas 53'	Stadium: Töölön Pallokenttä; Attendance: 3,851; Referee: Ivar Gustafsson (Sweden)

3 July 1929–32 Nordic Championship	Sweden	8–2	Finland	Stockholm, Sweden
19:00 (UTC+1:00)	Gardtman 12'; Zetterberg 18', 25', 30', 55'; Hansson 35', 65', 73'	Report	Lintamo 78'; Grönlund 88' (pen.)	Stadium: Stockholms Stadion; Attendance: 20,000; Referee: Otto Remke (Denmark)

19 August Friendly	Finland	4–0	Latvia	Helsinki, Finland
18:30 (UTC+2); Match 57	Grönlund 11', 23'; Malmgren 15'; Åström 36'	Report		Stadium: Töölön Pallokenttä; Attendance: 3,500; Referee: Heinrich Paal (Estonia)

6 September 1929–32 Nordic Championship	Finland	4–4	Norway	Helsinki, Finland
Match 88	Kanerva 3'; Salin 5'; Åström 49', 75'	Report	A. Børresen 9'; Johannesen 24'; Pettersen 32'; L. Børresen 56'	Stadium: Töölön Pallokenttä; Attendance: 700; Referee: Knut Lensing (Sweden)

11 October 1929–32 Nordic Championship	Denmark	2–3	Finland	Copenhagen, Denmark
13:30 (UTC+1)	Uldaler 20'; Malmgren 23'	Report	Strömsten 40', 77'; Åström 86'	Stadium: Idrætsparken; Attendance: 22,000; Referee: Ivan Eklind (Sweden)

=== 1932 ===
16 May Friendly	Sweden	7–1	Finland	Stockholm, Sweden
14:00 (UTC+1:00)	Rydell 12', 20', 62'; Nilsson 30', 57'; Persson 34'; Holmberg 85'	Report	Kanerva 10'	Stadium: Stockholms Stadion; Attendance: 20,500; Referee: Per Andersen (Norway)

10 June 1929–32 Nordic Championship	Finland	1–3	Sweden	Helsinki, Finland
15:30 (UTC+2:00)	Grönlund 3'	Report	Nilsson 2'; Gardtman 51'; Holmberg 64' (pen.)	Stadium: Tölö bollplan Attendance: 7,000; Referee: Thoralf Kristiansen (Norway)

17 June 1929–32 Nordic Championship	Norway	2–1	Finland	Aker, Norway
19:30 (UTC+1); Match 91	Johannesen 51'	Report	Grönlund 35'	Stadium: Ullevaal Stadion; Attendance: 18,000; Referee: Carl Olsson (Sweden)

1 July Friendly	Finland	1–4	Germany	Helsinki, Finland
19:00 (UTC+2:00)	Åström 14'	Report	Hofmann 7', 80', 81'; Rutz 77'; Hofmann 70'	Stadium: Töölön Pallokenttä; Attendance: 3,917; Referee: John Erik Andersson (Sweden)

17 August Friendly	Estonia	0–3	Finland	Tallinn, Estonia
18:30 UTC+2		Report1; Report2	Salin 9'; Neuman-Tarimäe 25' (o.g.); Lintamo 37'	Stadium: Kadriorg Stadium; Attendance: 5,000; Referee: Alfreds Lazdinš (Latvia)

30 August 1929–32 Nordic Championship	Finland	4–2	Denmark	Tölö bollplan, Helsinki
18:00 (UTC+2:00)	Malmgren 26', 55'; Lintamo 35', 70'	Report	Jørgensen 19', 63'	Attendance: 7,500; Referee: Elias Englund (Sweden)

=== 1933 ===
14 July 1933–36 Nordic Championship	Sweden	2–0	Finland	Stockholm, Sweden
19:00 (UTC+1:00)	Kroon 58' (pen.); Bunke 86'	Report		Stadium: Stockholms Stadion; Attendance: 15,246; Referee: Poul Yssing (Denmark)

9 August Friendly	Finland	9–2	Lithuania	Helsinki, Finland
18:30 (UTC+2:00)	Åström 2', 70'; Grönlund 19', 62'; Ronkanen 32', 56'; Karjagin 41', 83'; Viinioksa 7'	Report	Z. Sabaliauskas 4', 87'	Stadium: Töölön Pallokenttä; Attendance: 3,196; Referee: Voldemar Rõks (Estonia)

16 August Friendly	Finland	2–1	Estonia	Helsinki, Finland
18:15 UTC+2	Weckström 48'; Einman 65' (o.g.)	Report1; Report2	Ader 39'	Stadium: Töölön Pallokenttä; Attendance: 3,950; Referee: Ragnar Bäckström (Sweden)

3 September 1933–36 Nordic Championship	Finland	1–5	Norway	Helsinki, Finland
(UTC+2); Match 97	Åström 32'	Report	Juve 20', 36', 46'; Viinioksa 49' (o.g.); Hansen 83'	Stadium: Töölön Pallokenttä; Attendance: 6,271; Referee: Gustaf Ekberg (Sweden)

8 October 1933–36 Nordic Championship	Denmark	2–0	Finland	Copenhagen, Denmark
13:30 (UTC+1)	Taarup 30'; Uldaler 57'	Report		Stadium: Idrætsparken; Attendance: 24,000; Referee: Thoralf Kristiansen (Norway)

=== 1934 ===
3 July 1933–36 Nordic Championship	Finland	2–1	Denmark	Pallokenttä, Helsinki
19:00 (UTC+2:00)	Taipale 19'; Salin 63'	Report	Lundsteen 30'	Attendance: 5,722; Referee: Georg Wittbolt (Sweden)

8 August 1934 Turaani Turniir	Estonia	1–1	Finland	Tallinn, Estonia
18:30 UTC+2	Siimenson 60'	Report1; Report2	Taipale 20'	Stadium: Kadriorg Stadium; Attendance: 5,000; Referee: Ragnar Bäckström (Sweden)

9 August 1934 Turaani Turniir	Hungary	4–3	Finland	Tallinn, Estonia
18:30 (UTC+2:00)	Taipale 13'; Kylmälä 30'; Malmgren 71', 73'	Report		Stadium: Kadriorg Stadium; Attendance: 3,000; Referee: Ragnar Bäckström (Sweden)

14 August Friendly	Latvia	1–1	Finland	Riga, Latvia
18:00	Priede 59'	Report	Kylmälä 78'	Stadium: LSB Stadions; Attendance: 3,000; Referee: Valerijonas Balčiūnas (Lithuania)

16 August Friendly	Lithuania	1–0	Finland	Kaunas, Lithuania
17:00 (UTC+2:00)	Kersnauskas 57'	Report		Stadium: Kariuomenės Stadionas; Attendance: 5,000; Referee: Juris Rēdlihs (Latvia)

2 September 1933–36 Nordic Championship	Norway	4–2	Finland	Aker, Norway
13:15 (UTC+1); Match 102	Berglie 14', 21' (pen.); Kvammen 24'; Hansen 26'	Report	Lönnberg 27', 67'	Stadium: Ullevaal Stadion; Attendance: 15,000; Referee: Einer Ulrich (Denmark)

23 September 1934 1933–36 Nordic Championship	Finland	5–4	Sweden	Helsinki, Finland
14:15 (UTC+2:00)	Koponen 2', 21'; Lintamo 33', 50'; Åström 49'	Report	Persson 6', 42', 87'; Keller 59'	Stadium: Töölön Pallokenttä; Attendance: 10,442; Referee: Otto Remke (Denmark)

=== 1935 ===
6 June Friendly	Finland	4–1	Latvia	Helsinki, Finland
19:00 (UTC+2); Match 57	Kanerva 50' (pen.); Weckström 60', 65'; Lintamo 85'	Report	Vestermans 25'	Stadium: Töölön Pallokenttä; Attendance: 4,000; Referee: Ivan Eklind (Sweden)

12 June 1933–36 Nordic Championship	Sweden	2–2	Finland	Stockholm, Sweden
19:15 (UTC+1:00)	Persson 46'; Nyberg 80'	Report	Weckström 11', 70'	Stadium: Stockholms Stadion; Attendance: 14,500; Referee: Thoralf Kristiansen (Norway)

7 August Friendly	Finland	2–2	Estonia	Helsinki, Finland
18:30 UTC+2	Larvo 38', 85'	Report1; Report2	Uukkivi 29'; Eelma 52'	Stadium: Töölön Pallokenttä; Attendance: 4,359; Referee: Otto Ohlsson (Sweden)

18 August Friendly	Germany	6–0	Finland	Munich, Germany
16:00 (UTC+1:00)	Lehner 3', 30', 56'; Conen 43', 46', 75'	Report		Stadium: Heinrich-Zisch-Stadion; Attendance: 35,000; Referee: Bruno Pfützner (Czechoslovakia)

8 September 1933–36 Nordic Championship	Finland	1–5	Norway	Helsinki, Finland
13:00 (UTC+2); Match 107	Larvo 28'	Report	Hoel 23', 52', 62'; Jamissen 68'; Kvammen 88'	Stadium: Töölön Pallokenttä; Attendance: 6,557; Referee: Ivar Gustafsson (Sweden)

6 October 1933–36 Nordic Championship	Denmark	5–1	Finland	Copenhagen, Denmark
13:30 (UTC+1)	Thielsen 8'; Uldaler 37', 41' (pen.); Sørensen 51'; Kleven 59'	Report	Grönlund 48'	Stadium: Idrætsparken; Attendance: 27,000; Referee: John Johansson (Sweden)

=== 1936 ===
30 June 1933–36 Nordic Championship	Finland	1–4	Denmark	Helsinki, Finland
19:00 (UTC+2:00)	Salin 17'	Report	Jørgensen 65', 81'; Kleven 77'; Hansen 89'	Stadium: Pallokenttä; Attendance: 8,357; Referee: Sölve Flisberg (Sweden)

6 August 1936 Summer Olympics first round	Peru	7–3	Finland	Berlin Hertha-BSC-Platz
	Fernández 17', 33', 47', 49', 70'; Villanueva 21', 67'	Report	Kanerva 42' (pen.); Grönlund 75'; Larvo 80'	Attendance: 2,500; Referee: Rinaldo Barlassina (ITA)

20 August Friendly	Estonia	2–2	Finland	Tallinn, Estonia
18:00 UTC+2	Uukkivi 63'; Kuremaa 69'	Report1; Report2	Grönlund 36'; Weckström 64'	Stadium: Kadriorg Stadium; Attendance: 4,500; Referee: Ragnar Bäckström (Sweden)

6 September 1933–36 Nordic Championship	Norway	0–2	Finland	Aker, Norway
13:15 (UTC+1); Match 117		Report	Weckström 3'; Lehtonen 48'	Stadium: Ullevaal Stadion; Attendance: 17,000; Referee: Otto Remke (Denmark)

27 September 1933–36 Nordic Championship	Finland	1–2	Sweden	Helsinki, Finland
13:00 (UTC+2:00)	Kanerva 85' (pen.)	Report	Jonasson 44'; Ericsson 50'	Stadium: Töölön Pallokenttä; Attendance: 11,922; Referee: Kolbjørn Dæhlen (Norway)

=== 1937 ===
20 May Friendly	Finland	0–8	England	Helsinki, Finland
		Report1; Report2	Kirchen 6'; Payne 27', 56'; Steele 36', 52'; Johnson 44'; Willingham 75'; Robinson 87'	Stadium: Töölön Pallokenttä; Attendance: 9,533; Referee: Rudolf Eklöw (Sweden)

16 June 1938 FIFA World Cup qualification Group 1	Sweden	4–0	Finland	Stockholm, Sweden
	Bunke 60', 82'; Persson 65'; Svanström 68'	Report		Stadium: Solna Råsunda Stadion; Attendance: 19,554; Referee: Kolbjørn Daehlen (Norway)

29 June 1938 FIFA World Cup qualification Group 1	Finland	0–2	Germany	Helsinki, Finland
		Report	Lehner 26'; Urban 38'	Stadium: Pallokenttä; Attendance: 6,519; Referee: Otto Remke (Denmark)

19 August 1938 FIFA World Cup qualification Group 1	Finland	0–1	Estonia	Turku, Finland
18:00 UTC+2		Report1; Report2	Kuremaa 56'	Stadium: Tapiolan urheilupuisto Attendance: 4,797; Referee: Ivan Eklind (Sweden)

5 September 1937–47 Nordic Championship	Finland	0–2	Norway	Helsinki, Finland
12:30 (UTC+1); Match 123		Report	Martinsen 21', 53'	Stadium: Töölön Pallokenttä; Attendance: 7,881; Referee: Sölve Flisberg (Sweden)

17 October 1937–47 Nordic Championship	Denmark	2–1	Finland	Copenhagen, Denmark
13:30 (UTC+1)	Andersen 48'; Friedmann 58'	Report	Mäkelä 24'	Stadium: Idrætsparken; Attendance: 27,000; Referee: Alfred Birlem (Germany)

=== 1938 ===
15 June Friendly	Sweden	2–0	Finland	Stockholm, Sweden
19:30	Lagerkrantz 9'; Bergström 70'	Report		Stadium: Solna Råsunda Stadion; Attendance: 11,044; Referee: Oscar Carlsen (Norway)

17 June 1937–47 Nordic Championship	Norway	9–0	Finland	Aker, Norway
19:30 (UTC+1); Match 130	Isaksen 3'; Brustad 11', 22', 25', 33'; Kvammen 17' (pen.), 51'; Andersen 67'; Arnesen 70'	Report		Stadium: Ullevaal Stadion; Attendance: 28,000; Referee: Valdemar Laursen (Denmark)

4 July 1938 1937–47 Nordic Championship	Finland	2–4	Sweden	Helsinki Olympic Stadium, Helsinki, Finland
19:00 (UTC+2:00)	Lintamo 2'; Granström 37'	Report	Lagerkrantz 27', 67'; Bergström 51'; Nyberg 74'	Attendance: 15,366; Referee: Peco Bauwens (Germany)

17 August Friendly	Estonia	1–3	Finland	Tallinn, Estonia
18:30 UTC+2	Siimenson 39'	Report1; Report2	Weckström 27'; Eronen 85'; Lehtonen 87'	Stadium: Kadriorg Stadium; Attendance: 6,000; Referee: Karl Brust (Germany)

31 August 1937–47 Nordic Championship	Finland	2–1	Denmark	Pallokenttä, Helsinki, Finland
18:00 (UTC+2:00)	Lintamo 15'; Lehtonen 46'	Report	Sørensen 59'	Attendance: 11,368; Referee: Rudolf Eklöv (Sweden)

18 September Friendly	Finland	3–1	Lithuania	Helsinki, Finland
14:00 (UTC+2:00)	Lehtonen 30', 56', 75'	Report	Jaškevičius 16'	Stadium: Helsingin Olympiastadion; Attendance: 6,547; Referee: Eduard Eelma (Estonia)

=== 1939 ===
9 June 1937–47 Nordic Championship	Sweden	5–1	Finland	Råsunda Stadium, Solna, Sweden
19:30 (UTC+1:00)	Andersson 13'; Persson 30', 64', 67'; Grahn 35' (pen.)	Report	Nilsson 10' (o.g.)	Attendance: 16,989; Referee: Reidar Randers Johansen (Norway)

15 June Friendly; DBU 50th Anniversary Tournament; Semifinal	Denmark	5–0	Finland	Copenhagen, Denmark
13:30 (UTC+1)	Thielsen 16' (pen.); Kaj Hansen 35', 58'; Søbirk 42', 54'	Report		Stadium: Idrætsparken; Attendance: 19,000; Referee: Willy Peters (Germany)

20 July Friendly	Finland	2–3	Italy	Helsinki, Finland
17:00 EET (UTC+02:00)	Lehtonen 21'; Weckström 41'	Report	Piola 12', 28', 84'	Stadium: Helsinki Olympic Stadium; Attendance: 15,547; Referee: Ivan Eklind (Sweden)

4 August Friendly	Finland	4–2	Estonia	Helsinki, Finland
19:00 UTC+2	Kylmälä 48', 66', 78'; Eronen 88'	Report1; Report2	Uukkivi 9'; Kass 52'	Stadium: Helsinki Olympic Stadium; Attendance: 6,154; Referee: Arvīds Jurgens (Latvia)

3 September 1937–47 Nordic Championship	Finland	1–2	Norway	Helsinki, Finland
17:00 (UTC+2); Match 140	Eronen 63'	Report	Andersen 7', 60'	Stadium: Helsinki Olympic Stadium; Attendance: 8,729; Referee: Rudolf Eklöw (Sweden)

17 September 1937–47 Nordic Championship	Denmark	8–1	Finland	Idrætsparken, Copenhagen, Denmark
13:30 (UTC+1:00)	Nielsen 24'; Thiesen 39', 57', 89'; Lindbäck 48' (o.g.); Jørgensen 67'; Albrechtsen 77'; Søbirk 87'	Report	Granström 69'	Attendance: 20,000; Referee: Eklind (Sweden)

24 September Friendly	Finland	0–3	Latvia	Helsinki, Finland
14:00 (UTC+2); Match 57	Vanags 39', 49'; Kaņeps 60'	Report	Vestermans 25'	Stadium: Helsingin Olympiastadion; Attendance: 4,097; Referee: Otto Remke (Denmark)
