= Sweden men's national football team results (1920–1939) =

This article provides details of international football games played by the Sweden men's national football team from 1920 to 1939.

During this period, they competed at two Summer Olympics, the 1920 Antwerp Games and the 1936 Berlin Games, where they were knocked-out by the Netherlands in the quarter-finals and Japan in the first round, respectively. They also competed at two FIFA World Cups in 1934 and 1938, being eliminated by Germany in the quarter-finals and by Hungary in the semifinals, respectively. They also played the inaugural edition of the Nordic Football Championship in 1924–28, winning the 1933–36 edition.

== 1920s ==
=== 1920 ===
30 May Friendly	Sweden	1–0	Finland	Stockholm, Sweden
14:00 (UTC+1:00)	Dahl 38', 69'; Krantz 75', 76'	Report		Stadium: Stockholm Olympic Stadium; Attendance: 10,000; Referee: Paul Putz (Belgium)

6 June Friendly	Sweden	0–1	Finland	Stockholm, Sweden
18:00 (UTC+1:00)	Martenet 82'	Report		Stadium: Stockholm Olympic Stadium; Attendance: 12,000; Referee: Willem Eijmers (Netherlands)

27 June Friendly	Norway	0–3	Sweden	Kristiania, Norway
13:00 (UTC+1)		Report	Andersson 10'; Bergström 22'; Karlsson 65'	Stadium: Gressbanen; Attendance: 14,000; Referee: Hagbard Vestergaard (Denmark)

28 August 1920 Summer Olympics first round	Sweden	9–0	Greece	Antwerp, Belgium
17:30	Olsson 4', 79'; Karlsson 15', 20', 21', 51', 85'; Wicksell 25'; Dahl 31'	Report		Stadium: Olympic Stadium; Attendance: 5,000; Referee: Charles Barette (BEL)

29 August 1920 Summer Olympics, Quarter-final	Netherlands	5–4 (a.e.t.)	Sweden	Antwerp, Belgium
10:00	Groosjohan 10', 57'; J. Bulder 44', 88' (pen.); De Natris 115'	Report	Karlsson 16', 32'; Olsson 20'; Dahl 72'	Stadium: Stadion Broodstraat; Attendance: 5000; Referee: Josef Fanta (Czechoslovakia)

1 September 1920 Summer Olympics Repechage first round	Spain	2–1	Sweden	Antwerp, Belgium
15:30 (UTC+1:00)	Belauste 50'; Acedo 80'	Report	25' Dahl	Stadium: Broodstraat; Attendance: 1,500; Referee: Giovanni Mauro (Italy)

19 September Friendly	Finland	1–0	Sweden	Helsinki, Finland
14:00 (UTC+1:40)	Öhman 36'	Report		Stadium: Töölön Pallokenttä; Attendance: 4,500; Referee: Thorvald Johnson (Norway)

26 September Friendly	Sweden	0–0	Norway	Stockholm, Sweden
14:00 (UTC+1)		Report		Stadium: Olympic Stadium; Attendance: 16,000; Referee: Willem Boas (Netherlands)

10 October Friendly	Sweden	0–2	Denmark	Stockholm, Sweden
14:00 (UTC+1)		Report	Hansen 19'; Michael Rohde 41'	Stadium: Råsunda; Attendance: 12,000; Referee: Willem Boas (Netherlands)

=== 1921 ===
26 March Friendly	Austria	2–2	Sweden	Vienna, Austria
	Kuthan 43', 86'	Report	Horndahl 5'; E. Andersson 88'	Stadium: Simmeringer Had; Attendance: 35,000; Referee: Wolf Boas (Netherlands)

29 May Friendly	Sweden	0–3	Finland	Stockholm, Sweden
13:30 (UTC+1:00)	Öhman 10'; Kelin 28', 89'	Report		Stadium: Stockholm Olympic Stadium; Attendance: 12,000; Referee: Lauritz Andersen (Denmark)

19 June Friendly	Norway	3–1	Sweden	Kristiania, Norway
12:30 (UTC+1)	Gundersen 44'; Strøm 48'; Resberg 73'	Report	Kock 75'	Stadium: Gressbanen; Attendance: 15,000; Referee: Jack Howcroft (England)

22 July Friendly	Estonia	0–0	Sweden	Tallinn, Estonia
19:00 UTC+2		Report1; Report2		Stadium: Tiigiveski Spordiplats; Attendance: 3,500; Referee: Karlo Akel (Estonia)

24 July Friendly	Sweden	1–3	Austria	Stockholm, Sweden
	Dahl 44'	Report	Uridil 9'; Kuthan 17', 59'	Stadium: Stockholm Olympic Stadium; Attendance: 18,000; Referee: Wolf Boas (Netherlands)

18 September Friendly	Sweden	0–3	Norway	Stockholm, Sweden
12:30 (UTC+1)		Report	Gundersen 9'; Holm 19'; Wilhelms 44'	Stadium: Olympic Stadium; Attendance: 12,000; Referee: Lauritz Andersen (Denmark)

9 October Friendly	Sweden	0–0	Denmark	Stockholm, Sweden
13:30 (UTC+1)		Report		Stadium: Råsunda; Attendance: 18,000; Referee: Ragnvald Smedvik (Norway)

6 November Friendly	Hungary	4–2	Sweden	Budapest, Hungary
14:30 (UTC+1:00)	Orth 15', 49', 54'; Schlosser 72'	Report	Carlsson 70' (pen.), 87'	Stadium: Üllői úti stadion Attendance: 34,000; Referee: Willem Boas (Netherlands)

13 November Friendly	Czechoslovakia	2–2	Sweden	Prague, Czechoslovakia
14:30 (UTC+1:00)	Janda 32', 54'	Report	Carlsson 30'; Edlund 65'	Stadium: Stadion Letná; Attendance: 10,000; Referee: Heinrich Retschury (Austria)

=== 1922 ===
28 May Friendly	Sweden	1–2	Poland	Stockholm, Sweden
13:45	Svedberg 56'	Report	Klotz 27' (pen.); Garbień 74'	Stadium: Stockholms Olympiastadion; Attendance: 16,142; Referee: Hugo Meisl (Austria)

5 June Friendly	Finland	1–4	Sweden	Helsinki, Finland
18:00 (UTC+2:00)	Katajavuori 20'	Report	Edlund 5', 47'; Kaufeldt 10', 73'	Stadium: Töölön Pallokenttä; Attendance: 5,000; Referee: Hugo Meisl (Austria)

9 July Friendly	Sweden	1–1	Hungary	Solna, Sweden
14:00 (UTC+1:00)	Börjesson 43'	Report	Hirzer 77'	Stadium: Råsunda Stadium; Attendance: 14,000; Referee: Per Andersen (Norway)

13 August Friendly	Sweden	0–2	Czechoslovakia	Stockholm, Sweden
14:00 (UTC+1:00)		Report	Sloup 29'; Dvořáček 37'	Stadium: Stockholms Stadion; Attendance: 17,000; Referee: Lauritz Andersen (Denmark)

23 August Friendly	Sweden	0–0	Norway	Stockholm, Sweden
17:30 (UTC+1)		Report		Stadium: Olympic Stadium; Attendance: 14,000; Referee: Einer Ulrich (Denmark)

24 September Friendly	Norway	0–5	Sweden	Kristiania, Norway
12:30 (UTC+1)		Report	Malm 4', 25'; Dahl 30', 40', 75'	Stadium: Gressbanen; Attendance: 15,000; Referee: Lauritz Andersen (Denmark)

1 October Friendly	Denmark	1–2	Sweden	Copenhagen, Denmark
13:30 (UTC+1)	Nielsen 38'	Report	H. Dahl 26'; A. Dahl 58'	Stadium: Københavns Idrætspark; Attendance: 23,000; Referee: Willem Eijmers (Netherlands)

=== 1923 ===
21 May Friendly	Sweden	2–4	England	Stockholm, Sweden
13:30 (UTC+1:00)	Dahl	Report1; Report2	Walker; Thornewell; Moore	Stadium: Råsunda; Attendance: 12,000; Referee: Hugo Meisl (Austria)

10 June Friendly	Sweden	4–2	Austria	Gothenburg, Sweden
	H. Dahl 39'; Olsson 43'; C. Dahl 73', 88'	Report	Swatosch 40'; Wieser 52'	Stadium: Slottsskogsvallen; Attendance: 9,500; Referee: Karel Herites (Czechoslovakia)

20 June Friendly	Sweden	5–4	Finland	Gävle, Sweden
19:15 (UTC+1:00)	Rydell 1'; Paulsson 31', 48', 64'; Carlsson 37'	Report	Kelin 4'; Linna 20', 54'; Eklöf 66'	Stadium: Strömvallen; Attendance: 4,055; Referee: Peco Bauwens (Germany)

29 June Friendly	Sweden	2–1	Germany	Stockholm, Sweden
19:00 (UTC+1:00)	Seiderer 43'	Report	H. Dahl 47'; A. Dahl 64'	Stadium: Olympic Stadium; Attendance: 16,000; Referee: Ragnvald Smedvik (Norway)

16 September Friendly	Norway	2–3	Sweden	Kristiania, Norway
12:30 (UTC+1)	Wilhelms 28'; Ulrichsen 65' (pen.)	Report	Kaufeldt 52'; Kock 73'; Rydell 80'	Stadium: Gressbanen; Attendance: 14,000; Referee: Lauritz Andersen (Denmark)

14 October Friendly	Sweden	1–3	Denmark	Stockholm, Sweden
13:30 (UTC+1)	Sundberg 81' (pen.)	Report	Jørgensen 20'; Nilsson 27'; Vilhelmsen 87'	Stadium: Råsunda; Attendance: 18,000; Referee: Tom Robertson (Scotland)

28 October Friendly	Hungary	2–1	Sweden	Budapest, Hungary
15:00 (UTC+1:00)	Eisenhoffer 11', 36'	Report	Detter 2'	Stadium: Üllői úti stadion Attendance: 35,000; Referee: Willy Schmieger (Austria)

1 November Friendly	Poland	2–2	Sweden	Kraków, Poland
15:00	Staliński 7', 49'	Report	Dahl 15'; Helgesson 78'	Stadium: Stadion Cracovia; Attendance: 10,000; Referee: Imre Vértes (Hungary)

=== 1924 ===
18 May Friendly	Sweden	5–1	Poland	Stockholm, Sweden
14:00	Rydell 6', 61', 83'; Olsson 49'; Svensson 69'	Report	Batsch 57'	Stadium: Olympiastadion; Attendance: 13,000; Referee: Willem Boas (Netherlands)

29 May 1924 Summer Olympics Second round	Sweden	8–1	Belgium	Colombes, France
16:00	Kock 8', 24', 77'; Rydell 20', 61', 83'; Brommesson 30'; Keller 46'	Report	Larnoe 67'	Stadium: Stade Olympique; Attendance: 8,532; Referee: Heinrich Retschury (Austria)

1 June 1924 Summer Olympics Quarter-finals	Sweden	5–0	Egypt	Paris, France
16:00	Kaufeldt 5', 71'; Brommesson 31', 34'; Rydell 49'	Report		Stadium: Stade Pershing; Attendance: 6,484; Referee: Henri Christophe (Belgium)

5 June 1924 Summer Olympics Semi-finals	Switzerland	2–1	Sweden	Colombes, France
17:00	Abegglen 15', 77'	Report	Kock 41'	Stadium: Stade Olympique; Attendance: 7,448; Referee: Mihaly Ivancsics (Hungary)

8 June 1924 Summer Olympics Bronze medal match	Sweden	1–1	Netherlands	Colombes, France
16:00	Kaufeldt 44'	Report	le Fèvre 77'	Stadium: Stade Olympique; Attendance: 9,915; Referee: Heinrich Retschury (Austria)

9 June 1924 Summer Olympics Bronze medal match	Sweden	3–1	Netherlands	Colombes, France
14:30	Rydell 34', 77'; Lundqvist 42'	Report	Formenoy 43' (pen.)	Stadium: Stade Olympique; Attendance: 40,522; Referee: Youssuf Mohamed (Egypt)

15 June 1924–28 Nordic Championship	Denmark	2–3	Sweden	Copenhagen, Denmark
13:00 (UTC+1)	Olsen 2'; Nilsson 47'	Report	Kaufeldt 59'; Rydell 71', 75'	Stadium: Idrætsparken; Attendance: 25,000; Referee: Noel Watson (England)

29 June Friendly	Sweden	5–0	Egypt	Stockholm, Sweden
14:00 UTC+1	Keller 13'; Rydell 19', 21', 24', 56'	Report		Stadium: Stockholm Olympic Stadium; Attendance: 17,000; Referee: Sophus Hansen (Denmark)

25 July Friendly	Sweden	5–2	Estonia	Stockholm, Sweden
18:45 UTC+1	Haglund 22'; Keller 40'; Kock 63'; Kaufeldt 89'	Report1; Report2	Üpraus 2'; Väli 61'	Stadium: Stockholm Olympic Stadium; Attendance: 4,000; Referee: Gösta Löfgren (Finland)

28 July Friendly	Finland	5–7	Sweden	Helsinki, Finland
19:00 (UTC+2:00)	Fallström 8', 15'; Eklöf 25'; Koponen 29'; Karjagin 42'	Report	Haglund 18', 89'; Kock 35' (pen.), 77' (pen.), 84' (pen.); Karlsson 65', 70'	Stadium: Töölön Pallokenttä; Attendance: 3,500; Referee: Julius Reinans (Estonia)

31 August International Friendly	Germany	1–4	Sweden	Berlin, Germany
16:30 (UTC+1:00)	Harder 28'	Report	Wenzel 19'; Malm 80'; Rydberg 81'; Carlsson 89'	Stadium: Deutsches Stadion; Attendance: 20,000; Referee: Félix Herren (Switzerland)

21 September 1924–28 Nordic Championship	Sweden	6–1	Norway	Solna, Sweden
14:00 (UTC+1)	Keller 2'; Kaufeldt 44', 54'; Rydell 78', 86', 89'	Report	Berstad 32'	Stadium: Råsunda IP; Attendance: 8,000; Referee: John Langenus (Belgium)

9 November Friendly	Austria	1–1	Sweden	Vienna, Austria
	Wesely 23' (pen.)	Report	Paulsson 41'	Stadium: Simmeringer Had; Attendance: 40,000; Referee: Marcel Slawick (France)

16 November Friendly	Italy	2–2	Sweden	Milan, Italy
14:30 CET (UTC+01:00)	Magnozzi 12', 54'	Report	Kaufeldt 2'; Malm 22'	Stadium: Campo di Viale Lombardia; Attendance: 25,000; Referee: Imre Vertes (Hungary)

=== 1925 ===
9 June Friendly	Sweden	4–0	Finland	Gothenburg, Sweden
19:15 (UTC+1:00)	Johansson 8', 23', 72' (pen.), 85'	Report		Stadium: Slottsskogsvallen; Attendance: 7,500; Referee: Ragnvald Smedvik (Germany)

14 June 1924–28 Nordic Championship	Sweden	0–2	Denmark	Stockholm, Sweden
14:00 (UTC+1)		Report	Larsen 37'; Nielsen 65'	Stadium: Stockholms Stadion; Attendance: 19,000; Referee: Noel Watson (England)

21 June Friendly	Sweden	1–0	Germany	Stockholm, Sweden
14:00 (UTC+1:00)	Johansson 9'	Report		Stadium: Olympic Stadium; Attendance: 10,000; Referee: Lauritz Andersen (Denmark)

12 July Friendly	Sweden	6–2	Hungary	Stockholm, Sweden
15:00 (UTC+1:00)	Johansson 3', 27', 50'; Rydell 19', 78'; Kaufeldt 84'	Report	Takács 51', 71'	Stadium: Olympic Stadium; Attendance: 17,000; Referee: Sophus Hansen (Denmark)

23 August 1924–28 Nordic Championship	Norway	3–7	Sweden	Oslo, Norway
12:30 (UTC+1)	Berstad 3', 34'; Lunde 68'	Report	Rydell 22', 42', 44', 62'; Kaufeldt 30', 89'; Haglund 71'	Stadium: Gressbanen; Attendance: 15,000; Referee: Lauritz Andersen (Denmark)

5 July Friendly	Sweden	2–4	Austria	Stockholm, Sweden
	Rydell 64'; Keller 82'	report	Horvath 11', 22', 61'; Swatosch 60'	Stadium: Stockholm Olympic Stadium; Attendance: 14,000; Referee: Peco Bauwens (Germany)

1 November Friendly	Poland	2–6	Sweden	Kraków, Poland
14:00 (UTC+1:00)	Sperling 23'; Kuchar 62'	Report	Dahl 7', 9'; Johansson 25', 28', 30'; Rydberg 40'	Stadium: Stadion Cracovii; Attendance: 6,000; Referee: František Cejnar (Czechoslovakia)

=== 1926 ===
9 June 1924–28 Nordic Championship	Sweden	3–2	Norway	Stockholm, Sweden
19:15 (UTC+1)	Kaufeldt 31'; Rydell 60', 69'	Report	Andersen 19'; Gundersen 26'	Stadium: Olympic Stadium; Attendance: 13,500; Referee: František Cejnar (Czechoslovakia)

13 June Friendly	Sweden	2–2	Czechoslovakia	Stockholm, Sweden
14:00 (UTC+1:00)	Kaufeldt 75'; Holmberg 89'	Report	Novák 49', 77'	Stadium: Stockholms Stadion; Attendance: 15,000; Referee: Lauritz Andersen (Denmark)

20 June Friendly	Germany	3–3	Sweden	Nuremberg, Germany
16:00 (UTC+1:00)	Harder 21', 35', 43'	Report	Hallbäck 26', 82'; Olsson 34'	Stadium: Zabo; Attendance: 10,000; Referee: Lauritz Andersen (Denmark)

3 July Friendly	Czechoslovakia	4–2	Sweden	Prague, Czechoslovakia
15:00 (UTC+1:00)	Mareš 19'; Jelínek 25'; Novák 54'; Meduna 64'	Report	Holmberg 44'; Johansson 87'	Stadium: Stadion Letná; Attendance: 17,000; Referee: Eugen Braun (Austria)

18 July Friendly	Sweden	5–3	Italy	Stockholm, Sweden
16:00 CET (UTC+01:00)	Rydberg 2'; Holmberg 5'; Kroon 22'; Johansson 63', 89' (pen.)	Report	Levratto 32', 85'; L. Cevenini 57'	Stadium: Tranebergs Idrottsplats; Attendance: 12,000; Referee: Sophus Hansen (Denmark)

20 July Friendly	Latvia	4–1	Sweden	Riga, Latvia
18:30 (UTC+2:00)	Strazdiņš 6'; Šeibelis 41' (pen.); Tauriņš 47'; Pavlovs 66'	Report	Hedström 3'	Stadium: LSB Stadions; Attendance: 5,000; Referee: Alexander McKibbin (Estonia)

23 July Friendly	Sweden	5–2	Estonia	Stockholm, Sweden
18:45 UTC+1	Haglund 22'; Keller 40'; Kock 63'; Kaufeldt 89'	Report1; Report2	Üpraus 2'; Väli 61'	Stadium: Stockholm Olympic Stadium; Attendance: 4,000; Referee: Gösta Löfgren (Finland)

26 July Friendly	Finland	2–3	Sweden	Helsinki, Finland
18:15 (UTC+2:00)	Kanerva 5'; Saario 28'	Report	Hedström 62', 82'; Sundberg 84'	Stadium: Töölön Pallokenttä; Attendance: 4,000; Referee: Peco Bauwens (Germany)

3 October 1924–28 Nordic Championship	Denmark	2–0	Sweden	Copenhagen, Denmark
13:30 (UTC+1)	Bendixen 41' (pen.); Rohde 70'	Report		Stadium: Idrætsparken; Attendance: 26,000; Referee: Peco Bauwens (Germany)

3 October Friendly	Sweden	3–1	Poland	Stockholm, Sweden
13:00 (UTC+1)	Rydberg 30', 31'; Keller 43'	Report	Adamek 54'	Stadium: Stockholm Olympic Stadium; Attendance: 17,000; Referee: Ragnvald Smedvik (Norway)

7 November Friendly	Austria	3–1	Sweden	Vienna, Austria
	Horvath 1'; Klima 44'; Sindelar 83'	Report	Rydberg 14'	Stadium: Hohe Warte Stadium; Attendance: 38,000; Referee: Peco Bauwens (Germany)

14 November Friendly	Hungary	3–1	Sweden	Budapest, Hungary
14:00 (UTC+1:00)	Braun 4'; Opata 30'; Kohut 67'	Report	Svensson 85'	Stadium: Üllői úti stadion Attendance: 26,000; Referee: Eugen Braun (Austria)

=== 1927 ===
3 April Friendly	Belgium	2–1	Sweden	Forest, Belgium
15:00	Braine 6'; Adams 50'	Report	Rydell 46'	Stadium: La Butte; Attendance: 17,000; Referee: Willem Eijmers (Netherlands)

29 May Friendly	Sweden	12–0	Latvia	Stockholm, Sweden
14:30 UTC+1	Hallbäck 9', 30', 31', 44', 77', 84'; Rydell 11', 65', 85'; Johansson 40'; Kaufeldt 48'; Andersson 80'	Report		Stadium: Stockholm Olympic Stadium; Attendance: 19,000; Referee: Peco Bauwens (Germany)

12 June Friendly	Sweden	6–2	Finland	Stockholm, Sweden
13:15 (UTC+1:00)	Hallbäck 24', 88'; Kaufeldt 33'; Johansson 71', 85'; Dahl 79'	Report	Åström 73', 87'	Stadium: Stockholm Olympic Stadium; Attendance: 17,000; Referee: Ragnvald Smedvik (Germany)

19 June 1924–28 Nordic Championship	Sweden	0–0	Denmark	Stockholm, Sweden
14:00 (UTC+1:00)		Report		Stadium: Stockholms Stadion; Attendance: 20,000; Referee: John Langenus (Belgium)

26 June 1924–28 Nordic Championship	Norway	3–5	Sweden	Oslo, Norway
13:00 (UTC+1)	Berstad 5', 80'; Gundersen 89'	Report	Rydell 18', 23', 65'; Olsson 38', 68'	Stadium: Gressbanen; Attendance: 10,000; Referee: Otto Remke (Denmark)

1 July Friendly	Sweden	3–1	Estonia	Norrköping, Sweden
19:00 UTC+1	Keller 2', 69', 79'	Report1; Report2	Paal 69'	Stadium: Norrköpings Idrottspark; Attendance: 5,134; Referee: Sophus Hansen (Denmark)

4 September Friendly	Sweden	7–0	Belgium	Stockholm, Sweden
14:00 (UTC+1:00)	Kroon 27', 81'; Kaufeldt 43', 80'; Brommesson 50'; Persson 71'; Holmberg 82'	Report		Stadium: Stockholms Stadion; Attendance: 18,558; Referee: Sophus Hansen (Denmark)

6 November Friendly	Switzerland	2–2	Sweden	Zürich, Switzerland
14:30 (UTC+1:00)	Ramseyer 20' (pen.); Abegglen 26'	Report	Rydell 21'; Kroon 33'	Stadium: Letzigrund; Attendance: 17,840; Referee: Eugen Braun (Austria)

13 November Friendly	Netherlands	1–0	Sweden	Amsterdam, Netherlands
14:00	Ghering 85'	Report		Attendance: 5000; Referee: Harry Kingscott (England)

=== 1928 ===
7 June 1924–28 Nordic Championship	Sweden	6–1	Norway	Stockholm, Sweden
19:15 (UTC+1)	Keller 15', 70'; Lundahl 22', 57'; Kroon 28', 76'	Report	Helgesen 54'	Stadium: Olympic Stadium; Attendance: 19,000; Referee: Otto Remke (Denmark)

1 July Friendly	Poland	2–1	Sweden	Katowice, Poland
18:30	Staliński 25', 70'	Report	Persson 10'	Stadium: 1. FC Katowice's field Attendance: 17,000; Referee: Peco Bauwens (Germany)

6 July Friendly	Latvia	0–4	Sweden	Riga, Latvia
19:00 (UTC+2:00)		Report	Lööf 14', 17', 35'; Pettersson 25'	Stadium: LSB Stadions; Attendance: 4,000; Referee: Ernst Thomaschky (Germany)

9 July Friendly	Estonia	0–1	Sweden	Tallinn, Estonia
19:00 UTC+2		Report1; Report2	Pettersson 81'	Stadium: Kadriorg Stadium; Attendance: 4,500; Referee: Matti Aalto (Finland)

29 July Friendly	Sweden	2–3	Austria	Stockholm, Sweden
	Lundahl 17', 22'	Report	Gschweidl 25'; Smistik 35'; Seidl 71'	Stadium: Stockholm Olympic Stadium; Attendance: 17,000; Referee: Lauritz Andersen (Denmark)

2 September Friendly	Finland	2–3	Sweden	Helsinki, Finland
13:00 (UTC+2:00)	Malmgren 60'; Kanerva 77'	Report	Bergström 3'; Andersson 8', 79'	Stadium: Töölön Pallokenttä; Attendance: 5,000; Referee: Karl August Andersen (Norway)

30 September Friendly	Sweden	2–0	Germany	Stockholm, Sweden
13:00 (UTC+1:00)	Lundahl 44' (pen.); Olsson 89'	Report		Stadium: Olympic Stadium; Attendance: 20,000; Referee: Sophus Hansen (Denmark)

7 October 1924–28 Nordic Championship	Denmark	3–1	Sweden	Copenhagen, Denmark
13:30 (UTC+1)	Rohde 6'; Jørgensen 8'; Nilsson 31'	Report	Rydell 32'	Stadium: Idrætsparken; Attendance: 27,500; Referee: Fritz Spranger (Germany)

=== 1929 ===
9 June Friendly	Sweden	6–2	Netherlands	Stockholm, Sweden
14:00 (UTC+1:00)	Dahl 11'; Rydell 17', 70', 77'; Kools 74' (o.g.); Nilsson 84'	Report	Smeets 74', 80'	Stadium: Stockholms Stadion; Attendance: 17,000; Referee: Otto Remke (Denmark)

14 June 1929–32 Nordic Championship	Sweden	3–1	Finland	Stockholm, Sweden
19:15 (UTC+1:00)	Lundahl 38' (pen.), 44'; Holmberg 76'	Report	Koponen 75'	Stadium: Stockholms Stadion; Attendance: 16,982; Referee: Frederik Schieldrop (Norway)

16 June 1929–32 Nordic Championship	Sweden	3–2	Denmark	Gothenburg, Sweden
13:00 (UTC+1)	Nilsson 9'; Kaufeldt 31'; Kroon 49'	Report	Larsen 64'; Uldaler 66'	Stadium: Slottsskogsvallen; Attendance: 20,553; Referee: Peco Bauwens (Germany)

7 July Friendly	Sweden	4–1	Estonia	Landskrona, Sweden
18:00 UTC+1	Lundahl 14', 65'; Kroon 20'; Dahl 79' (pen.)	Report1; Report2	Joll 88'	Stadium: Landskrona IP; Attendance: 10,000; Referee: Otto Remke (Denmark)

28 July Friendly	Sweden	10–0	Latvia	Malmö, Sweden
18:00 UTC+1	Hallbäck 10', 67'; Rydell 13'; Kroon 15', 63'; Andersson 46', 77', 87'; Helgesson 62'; Nilsson 83'	Report		Stadium: Malmö Idrottsplats; Attendance: 8,944; Referee: Otto Remke (Denmark)

29 September 1929–32 Nordic Championship	Norway	2–1	Sweden	Aker, Norway
13:00 (UTC+1)	Juve 21'; O. Gundersen 66'	Report	Kroon 33'	Stadium: Ullevaal Stadion; Attendance: 24,200; Referee: Lauritz Andersen (Denmark)

== 1930s ==
=== 1930 ===
15 June Friendly	Sweden	1–0	Belgium	Stockholm, Sweden
14:00 (UTC+1:00)	Kroon 82'	Report		Stadium: Stockholms Stadion; Attendance: 17,500; Referee: Louis Baert (Belgium)

22 June 1929–32 Nordic Championship	Denmark	6–1	Sweden	Copenhagen, Denmark
13:30 (UTC+1:00)	Jørgensen 17', 65', 88'; Eriksen 45'; Kleven 79'; Christophersen 90' (pen.)	Report	Nilsson 66'	Stadium: Idrætsparken; Attendance: 28,000; Referee: Karl Weingärtner (Germany)

6 July 1929–32 Nordic Championship	Sweden	6–3	Norway	Stockholm, Sweden
14:00 (UTC+1)	Lundahl 5', 13', 48'; Kroon 29', 56'; Dahl 44'	Report	Juve 16', 42', 47'	Stadium: Olympic Stadium; Attendance: 18,000; Referee: Jan De Wolf (Netherlands)

18 July Friendly	Estonia	1–5	Sweden	Tallinn, Estonia
19:00 UTC+2	Gerassimov-Kalvet 26'	Report1; Report2	Sundberg 7', 44', 73'; Thörn 38'; Johansson 41'	Stadium: Kadriorg Stadium; Attendance: 4,500; Referee: Yrjö Tuhkunen (Finland)

22 July Friendly	Latvia	0–5	Sweden	Riga, Latvia
18:15 (UTC+2:00)		Report	Nilsson 5', 75'; Johansson 14'; Dunker 26', 80'	Stadium: LSB Stadions; Attendance: 5,000; Referee: Heinrich Paal (Estonia)

28 September Friendly	Sweden	0–3	Poland	Stockholm, Sweden
14:00 (UTC+1)		Report	Ciszewski 39', 69'; Smoczek 43'	Stadium: Stockholm Olympic Stadium; Attendance: 20,000; Referee: Matti Aalto (Finland)

28 September 1929–32 Nordic Championship	Finland	4–4	Sweden	Tölö bollplan, Helsinki
13:00 (UTC+2:00)	Lehtinen 9', 40', 41'; Koponen 15'	Report	Karlsson 26', 53', 64'; Andersson 60'	Attendance: 7,152; Referee: Otto Remke (Denmark)

28 September Friendly	Belgium	2–2	Sweden	Rocourt, Belgium
14:30	Secretin 30'; Braine 75'	Report	Dahl 41', 88'	Stadium: Stade Vélodrome de Rocourt; Attendance: 17,000; Referee: Adolf Miesz (Austria)

16 November Friendly	Austria	4–1	Sweden	Vienna, Austria
	Gschweidl 40'; Weselik 46'; Schall 65'; Wesely 80'	Report	Engdahl 23'	Stadium: Hohe Warte Stadium; Attendance: 12,000; Referee: Ferenc Majorszky (Hungary)

=== 1931 ===
17 June Friendly	Sweden	0–0	Germany	Stockholm, Sweden
19:15 (UTC+1:00)		Report		Stadium: Olympic Stadium; Attendance: 16,000; Referee: Sophus Hansen (Denmark)

28 June 1929–32 Nordic Championship	Sweden	3–1	Denmark	Stockholm, Sweden
14:00 (UTC+1:00)	Gardtman 47'; Rydell 73', 88' (pen.)	Report	Jørgensen 19'	Stadium: Stockholms Stadion; Attendance: 20,000; Referee: Alfred Birlem (Germany)

3 July 1929–32 Nordic Championship	Sweden	8–2	Finland	Stockholm, Sweden
19:00 (UTC+1:00)	Gardtman 12'; Zetterberg 18', 25', 30', 55'; Hansson 35', 65', 73'	Report	Lintamo 78'; Grönlund 88' (pen.)	Stadium: Stockholms Stadion; Attendance: 20,000; Referee: Otto Remke (Denmark)

8 July Friendly	Sweden	3–1	Estonia	Gothenburg, Sweden
19:30 UTC+1	Jacobsson 27'; Zetterberg 29', 75'	Report1; Report2	Eelma 80'	Stadium: Idrottsplatsen; Attendance: 6,000; Referee: Esko Pekkonen (Finland)

26 July Friendly	Sweden	6–0	Latvia	Västerås, Sweden
13:30 UTC+1	Sundberg 10', 44', 78'; Roos 12', 25'; Rydell 38' (pen.)	Report		Stadium: Arosvallen; Attendance: 7,000; Referee: Reidar Randers Johansen (Norway)

27 September 1929–32 Nordic Championship	Norway	2–1	Sweden	Aker, Norway
13:15 (UTC+1)	Andersen 9'; Juve 38'	Report	Hansson 71'	Stadium: Ullevaal Stadion; Attendance: 28,208; Referee: Karl Weingärtner (Germany)

8 November Friendly	Hungary	3–1	Sweden	Budapest, Hungary
	Spitz 37'; Avar 34', 56'	Report	Rydell 9'	Attendance: 13,000; Referee: Rinaldo Barlassina (Italy)

=== 1932 ===
16 May Friendly	Sweden	7–1	Finland	Stockholm, Sweden
14:00 (UTC+1:00)	Rydell 12', 20', 62'; Nilsson 30', 57'; Persson 34'; Holmberg 85'	Report	Kanerva 10'	Stadium: Stockholms Stadion; Attendance: 20,500; Referee: Per Andersen (Norway)

10 June 1929–32 Nordic Championship	Finland	1–3	Sweden	Helsinki, Finland
15:30 (UTC+2:00)	Grönlund 3'	Report	Nilsson 2'; Gardtman 51'; Holmberg 64' (pen.)	Stadium: Tölö bollplan Attendance: 7,000; Referee: Thoralf Kristiansen (Norway)

12 June Friendly	Sweden	3–1	Germany	Stockholm, Sweden
14:00 (UTC+1:00)	Sundberg 15', 78'; Hansson 50'	Report	Van den Eynde 22'	Stadium: Olympic Stadium; Attendance: 19,000; Referee: Karl Weingärtner (Germany)

19 June 1929–32 Nordic Championship	Denmark	3–1	Sweden	Copenhagen, Denmark
13:00 (UTC+1:00)	Hansen 4'; Petersen 23'; Jørgensen 80'	Report	Kroon 13'	Stadium: Idrætsparken; Attendance: 28,000; Referee: Moritz Fuchs (Germany)

1 July 1929–32 Nordic Championship	Sweden	1–4	Norway	Gothenburg, Sweden
19:15 (UTC+1)	Holmberg 39' (pen.)	Report	Juve 8', 53'; Moe 69', 76'	Stadium: Ullevi; Attendance: 22,108; Referee: Raphaël van Praag (Belgium)

10 July Friendly	Poland	2–0	Sweden	Warsaw, Poland
17:30	Nawrot 12'; Bator 84'	Report		Stadium: Stadion Wojska Polskiego; Attendance: 13,000; Referee: Alfred Birlem (Germany)

13 July Friendly	Latvia	0–0	Sweden	Riga, Latvia
18:30 (UTC+2:00)		Report		Stadium: LSB Stadions; Attendance: 4,000; Referee: Heinrich Paal (Estonia)

15 July Friendly	Estonia	1–3	Sweden	Tallinn, Estonia
19:00 UTC+2	Kass 77'	Report1; Report2	Johansson 25', 74'; Dunker 58'	Stadium: Kadriorg Stadium; Attendance: 6,000; Referee: Ragnar Wickström (Finland)

17 July Friendly	Sweden	3–4	Austria	Stockholm, Sweden
	Svensson 31'; Nilsson 76', 88'	Report	Vogl 10'; Sindelar 37'; Waitz 75'; Molzer 83'	Stadium: Stockholm Olympic Stadium; Attendance: 15,000; Referee: Sophus Hansen (Denmark)

25 September Friendly	Sweden	8–1	Lithuania	Solna, Sweden
14:00 (UTC+1:00)	Nilsson 59', 60', 65', 75'; Gustavsson 11', 78'; Johansson 42', 54'	Report	Efišovas 52'	Stadium: Stockholms Olympiastadion; Attendance: 15,000; Referee: Yrjö Tuhkunen (Finland)

25 September Friendly	Germany	4–3	Sweden	Nuremberg, Germany
15:30 (UTC+1:00)	Rohr 10', 64'; Kobierski 17'; Krumm 41'	Report	Lundahl 22'; Kempe 47'; Persson 78'	Stadium: Städtisches Stadion; Attendance: 30,000; Referee: Rinaldo Barlassina (Italy)

6 November Friendly	Switzerland	2–1	Sweden	Basel, Switzerland
14:30 (+1:00)	Abegglen 67', 87'	Report	Olsson 7'	Stadium: Landhof; Attendance: 22,000; Referee: Louis Baert (Belgium)

=== 1933 ===
11 June 1934 FIFA World Cup qualification Group 1	Sweden	6–2	Estonia	Stockholm, Sweden
14:00 UTC+1	Tipner 7'; Bunke 10', 43'; Ericsson 13', 70'; Andersson 79' (pen.)	Report1; Report2	Kass 47'; Kuremaa 61'	Stadium: Stockholm Olympic Stadium; Attendance: 8,123; Referee: Reidar Randers Johansen (Norway)

18 June 1933–36 Nordic Championship	Sweden	2–3	Denmark	Stockholm, Sweden
14:00 (UTC+1:00)	Ericsson 7', 20'	Report	Jørgensen 27'; Kleven 57', 82'	Stadium: Stockholms Stadion; Attendance: 20,297; Referee: Karl Wunderlin (Switzerland)

29 June 1934 WCQ Group 1	Lithuania	0–2	Sweden	Kaunas, Lithuania
18:00 (UTC+2:00)		Report	Hansson 55', 65'	Stadium: Kariuomenės Stadionas; Attendance: 6,000; Referee: August Silber (Estonia)

2 July Friendly	Sweden	5–2	Hungary	Stockholm, Sweden
	Persson 49'; Karlsson 56'; Bunke 58', 89'; Nilsson 65'	Report	Sárosi 20'; Toldi 57'	Stadium: Stockholms Stadion; Attendance: 18,569; Referee: Sophus Hansen (Denmark)

4 July Friendly	Latvia	1–1	Sweden	Riga, Latvia
18:30 (UTC+2:00)	Pētersons 72'	Report	Hansson 39'	Stadium: LSB Stadions; Attendance: 4,000; Referee: Valerijonas Balčiūnas (Lithuania)

14 July 1933–36 Nordic Championship	Sweden	2–0	Finland	Stockholm, Sweden
19:00 (UTC+1:00)	Kroon 58' (pen.); Bunke 86'	Report		Stadium: Stockholms Stadion; Attendance: 15,246; Referee: Poul Yssing (Denmark)

24 September 1933–36 Nordic Championship	Norway	0–1	Sweden	Aker, Norway
13:15 (UTC+1)		Report	Dunker 55'	Stadium: Ullevaal Stadion; Attendance: 33,000; Referee: Poul Yssing (Denmark)

=== 1934 ===
23 May Friendly	Sweden	4–2	Poland	Stockholm, Sweden
19:15 (UTC+1:00)	Jonasson 13'; Keller 36', 70', 74'	Report	Nawrot 26'; Wilimowski 59'	Stadium: Olympiastadion; Attendance: 20,000; Referee: Yrjö Tuhkunen (Finland)

27 May 1934 World Cup round of 16	Sweden	3–2	Argentina	Bologna, Italy
16:00 CET (UTC+01:00)	Jonasson 9', 67'; Kroon 79'	Report	Belis 4'; Galateo 48'	Stadium: Stadio Littoriale; Attendance: 14,000; Referee: Eugen Braun (Austria)

31 May 1934 World Cup quarter-finals	Germany	2–1	Sweden	Milan, Italy
16:30 CET (UTC+01:00)	Hohmann 60', 63'	Report	Dunker 82'	Stadium: Stadio San Siro; Attendance: 3,000; Referee: Rinaldo Barlassina (Italy)

17 June 1933–36 Nordic Championship	Denmark	3–5	Sweden	Copenhagen, Denmark
13:30 (UTC+1:00)	Uldaler 5'; Jørgensen 40', 48'	Report	Ericsson 6', 35', 60', 62'; Persson 23'	Stadium: Idrætsparken; Attendance: 30,000; Referee: Thoralv Kristiansen (Norway)

1 July 1933–36 Nordic Championship	Sweden	3–3	Norway	Stockholm, Sweden
19:00 (UTC+1)	Karlsson 5'; S. Andersson 13' (pen.); Ericsson 55'	Report	Pettersen 17' (pen.); Svendsen 29'; Pedersen 38'	Stadium: Olympic Stadium; Attendance: 20,000; Referee: Sophus Hansen (Denmark)

23 September 1933–36 Nordic Championship	Finland	5–4	Sweden	Helsinki, Finland
14:15 (UTC+2:00)	Koponen 2', 21'; Lintamo 33', 50'; Åström 49'	Report	Persson 6', 42', 87'; Keller 59'	Stadium: Töölön Pallokenttä; Attendance: 10,442; Referee: Otto Remke (Denmark)

23 September Friendly	Sweden	3–1	Latvia	Stockholm, Sweden
14:00 UTC+1	Andersson 64' (pen.); Karlsson 84'; Gustavsson 89'	Report	Jēnihs 4'	Stadium: Stockholms Stadion; Attendance: 16,000; Referee: Poul Dreiøe (Denmark)

=== 1935 ===
12 June 1933–36 Nordic Championship	Sweden	2–2	Finland	Stockholm, Sweden
19:15 (UTC+1:00)	Persson 46'; Nyberg 80'	Report	Weckström 11', 70'	Stadium: Stockholms Stadion; Attendance: 14,500; Referee: Thoralf Kristiansen (Norway)

16 June 1933–36 Nordic Championship	Sweden	3–1	Denmark	Gothenburg, Sweden
13:00 (UTC+1:00)	Grahn 44'; Jonasson 54'; Hallman 83'	Report	Jørgensen 34'	Stadium: Gamla Ullevi; Attendance: 30,000; Referee: Albert Fogg (England)

30 June 1935 Friendly	Sweden	3–1	Germany	Stockholm, Sweden
19:00 (UTC+1:00)	Hallman 30', 50'; Jonasson 59'	Report	Rohwedder 68'	Stadium: Olympic Stadium; Attendance: 20,000; Referee: Einer Ulrich (Denmark)

5 July Friendly	Latvia	0–3	Sweden	Riga, Latvia
18:30 (UTC+2:00)		Report	Karlsson 35'; Jonasson 43'; Samuelsson 76'	Stadium: LSB Stadions; Attendance: 7,000; Referee: Gábor Boronkai (Hungary)

9 July Friendly	Estonia	1–2	Sweden	Tallinn, Estonia
19:00 UTC+2	Eelma 62'	Report1; Report2	Samuelsson 15', 17'	Stadium: Kadriorg Stadium; Attendance: 7,000; Referee: Maati Aalto (Sweden)

1 September Friendly	Sweden	7–1	Romania	Stockholm, Sweden
14:00 (+1:00)	Bergsten 17'; Keller 47'; Nilsson 70', 73', 87'; Jonasson 72'; Persson 74'	Report	60' Georgescu	Stadium: Stockholms Olympiastadion; Attendance: 20,000; Referee: Rinaldo Barlassina (Italy)

22 September 1933–36 Nordic Championship	Norway	0–2	Sweden	Aker, Norway
13:15 (UTC+1)		Report	Nilsson 42'; Grahn 77'	Stadium: Ullevaal Stadion; Attendance: 35,495; Referee: Poul Drejø (Denmark)

10 November Friendly	France	2–0	Sweden	Paris, France
	Berg 33' (o.g.); Courtois 70'	Report; Report		Stadium: Parc des Princes; Attendance: 26,905; Referee: Arthur Barton (England)

17 November Friendly	Belgium	5–1	Sweden	Brussels, Belgium
14:00	Van Caelenberghe 15'; Capelle 18', 74'; Isemborghs 57', 80'	Report	Nilsson 12'	Stadium: Stade Roi Baudouin; Attendance: 15,000; Referee: Karl Weingärtner (Germany)

=== 1936 ===
14 June 1933–36 Nordic Championship	Denmark	4–3	Sweden	Copenhagen, Denmark
13:30 (UTC+1:00)	Søbirk 11'; Sven Andersson 41' (o.g.); Jørgensen 47'; Thielsen 81'	Report	Jensen 2' (o.g.); Jonasson 15'; Josefsson 76'	Stadium: Idrætsparken; Attendance: 35,600; Referee: Thoralv Kristiansen (Norway)

21 June Friendly	Sweden	5–2	Belgium	Stockholm, Sweden
19:00 (UTC+1:00)	Hallman 10', 82'; Jonasson 27', 56', 59'	Report	Aebi 55'; Bickel 89'	Stadium: Stockholms Stadion; Attendance: 13,603; Referee: Einer Ulrich (Denmark)

5 July 1933–36 Nordic Championship	Sweden	2–0	Norway	Gothenburg, Sweden
13:00 (UTC+1)	Jonasson 25', 36'	Report		Stadium: Ullevi; Attendance: 21,133; Referee: Louis Baert (Belgium)

26 July Friendly	Sweden	3–4	Norway	Stockholm, Sweden
18:30 (UTC+1)	Persson 15', 66'; Jonasson 88' (pen.)	Report	Kvammen 17' (pen.), 43', 65'; Isaksen 29'	Stadium: Olympic Stadium; Attendance: 20,000; Referee: Karl Weingärtner (Germany)

4 August 1936 Summer Olympics First round	Japan	3–2	Sweden	Berlin, Germany
	Kawamoto 49'; Ukon 62'; Matsunaga 85'	Report	Persson 24', 37'	Stadium: Hertha-BSC-Platz; Attendance: 5,000; Referee: Wilhelm Peters (Germany)

27 September 1933–36 Nordic Championship	Finland	1–2	Sweden	Helsinki, Finland
13:00 (UTC+2:00)	Kanerva 85' (pen.)	Report	Jonasson 44'; Ericsson 50'	Stadium: Töölön Pallokenttä; Attendance: 11,922; Referee: Kolbjørn Dæhlen (Norway)

=== 1937 ===
17 May Friendly	Sweden	0–4	England	Stockholm, Sweden
14:00 (UTC+1:00)		Report1; Report2	Steele 7', 13', 33'; Johnson 35'	Stadium: Råsunda Stadium; Attendance: 34,119; Referee: John Langenus (Belgium)

16 June 1938 FIFA World Cup qualification Group 1	Sweden	4–0	Finland	Stockholm, Sweden
	Bunke 60', 82'; Persson 65'; Svanström 68'	Report		Stadium: Solna Råsunda Stadion; Attendance: 19,554; Referee: Kolbjørn Daehlen (Norway)

20 June 1938 FIFA World Cup qualification Group 1	Sweden	7–2	Estonia	Solna, Sweden
19:00 UTC+1	Josefsson 8', 41'; Bunke 40'; Jonasson 50' (pen.); Wetterstrom 73', 80', 84'	Report1; Report2	Siimenson 2'; Uukkivi 3'	Stadium: Råsunda Stadium; Attendance: 18,171; Referee: Otto Remke (Denmark)

23 June Friendly	Poland	3–1	Sweden	Warsaw, Poland
18:00 (UTC+1:00)	Wodarz 12'; Piątek 24'; Wilimowski 62'	Report	Wetterström 76'	Stadium: Stadion Wojska Polskiego; Attendance: 18,000; Referee: Lucien Leclerq (France)

27 June Friendly	Romania	2–2	Sweden	Bucharest, Romania
	Barátky 25', 89'	Report	29', 37' Jonasson	Stadium: Stadionul Regele Carol II; Attendance: 25,000; Referee: John Langenus (Belgium]

19 September 1937–47 Nordic Championship	Norway	3–2	Sweden	Aker, Norway
13:15 (UTC+1)	Brustad 44'; Isaksen 74'; Kvammen 76'	Report	Johansson 55'; Bunke 82'	Stadium: Ullevaal Stadion; Attendance: 29,344; Referee: Arthur W. Barton (England)

3 October 1937–47 Nordic Championship	Sweden	1–2	Denmark	Stockholm, Sweden
14:00 (UTC+1:00)	Persson 86'	Report	Andersen 18'; Søbirk 58'	Stadium: Råsunda; Attendance: 38,000; Referee: Jimmy Jewell (England)

21 November 1937 1938 FIFA World Cup qualification Group 1	Germany	5–0	Sweden	Hamburg, Germany
	Siffling 2', 57'; Szepan 8'; Schön 48', 63'	Report		Stadium: Altonaer Stadion; Attendance: 55,000; Referee: Bruno Pfützner (Czechoslovakia)

=== 1938 ===
5 June 1938 1938 World Cup round of 16	Sweden	w/o	Austria	Lyon, France
				Stadium: Stade Gerland
Note: Austria did not participate due to the Anschluss, so Sweden advanced directly to the quarterfinals

10 June Friendly	Sweden	3–3	Latvia	Solna, Sweden
19:15 UTC+1	Bergström 4'; Hansson 25', 31'	Report	Krupšs 15'; Raisters 50'; Borduško 65'	Stadium: Råsunda IP; Attendance: 14,107; Referee: Matti Aalto (Finland)

12 June 1938 World Cup quarter-finals	Sweden	8–0	Cuba	Antibes, France
17:00 WEST (UTC+01:00)	H. Andersson 9', 81', 89'; Wetterström 22', 37', 44'; Keller 80'	Report		Stadium: Stade du Fort Carré; Attendance: 7,000; Referee: Augustin Krist (Czechoslovakia)

15 June Friendly	Sweden	2–0	Finland	Stockholm, Sweden
19:30	Lagerkrantz 9'; Bergström 70'	Report		Stadium: Solna Råsunda Stadion; Attendance: 11,044; Referee: Oscar Carlsen (Norway)

16 June 1938 World Cup Semi-finals	Hungary	5–1	Sweden	Paris, France
18:00 WEST (UTC+01:00)	Jacobsson 19' (o.g.); Titkos 37'; Zsengellér 39', 85'; Sárosi 65'	Report	Nyberg 1'	Stadium: Parc des Princes; Attendance: 20,000; Referee: Lucien Leclerq (France)

19 June 1938 World Cup Bronze medal match	Brazil	4–2	Sweden	Bordeaux, France
17:00 WEST (UTC+01:00)	Romeu 44'; Leônidas 63', 74'; Perácio 80'	Report	Jonasson 28'; Nyberg 38'	Stadium: Parc Lescure; Attendance: 12,000; Referee: John Langenus (Belgium)

21 June 1937–47 Nordic Championship	Denmark	0–1	Sweden	Copenhagen, Denmark
19:00 (UTC+1:00)		Report	Nyberg 35'	Stadium: Idrætsparken; Attendance: 38,260; Referee: Thoralv Kristiansen (Norway)

4 July 1938 1937–47 Nordic Championship	Finland	2–4	Sweden	Helsinki, Finland
19:00 (UTC+2:00)	Lintamo 2'; Granström 37'	Report	Lagerkrantz 27', 67'; Bergström 51'; Nyberg 74'	Stadium: Helsinki Olympic Stadium; Attendance: 15,366; Referee: Peco Bauwens (Germany)

7 August 1938 Friendly	Sweden	2–6	Czechoslovakia	Solna, Sweden
18:30 (+1:00)	Bergström 54'; Nyberg 61'	Report	Horák 13'; Bican 28', 33', 75'; Senecký 72', 89'	Stadium: Råsunda Stadium; Attendance: 20,237; Referee: Georges Capdeville (France)

4 September Friendly	Norway	2–1	Sweden	Aker, Norway
13:15 (UTC+1)	Arnesen 22'; Brynildsen 62'	Report	Hansson 15'	Stadium: Ullevaal Stadion; Attendance: 33,098; Referee: Valdemar Laursen (Denmark)

2 October 1937–47 Nordic Championship	Sweden	2–3	Norway	Solna, Sweden
14:00 (UTC+1)	Persson 27'; Nyberg 66'	Report	Brustad 16'; Brynildsen 18'; Nordahl 35'	Stadium: Råsunda Stadium; Attendance: 38,000; Referee: James Jewell (England)

=== 1939 ===
2 June Friendly	Sweden	3–2	Norway	Solna, Sweden
19:15 (UTC+1)	Martinsson 59'; Andersson 69'; Persson 84'	Report	Frantzen 39', 43'	Stadium: Råsunda Stadium; Attendance: 28,283; Referee: Valdemar Laursen (Denmark)

9 June 1937–47 Nordic Championship	Sweden	5–1	Finland	Solna, Sweden
19:30 (UTC+1:00)	Andersson 13'; Persson 30', 64', 67'; Grahn 35' (pen.)	Report	Nilsson 10' (o.g.)	Stadium: Råsunda Stadium; Attendance: 16,989; Referee: Reidar Randers Johansen (Norway)

11 June Friendly	Sweden	7–0	Lithuania	Karlstad, Sweden
18:00 (UTC+1:00)	Larsson 1', 87'; Hjelm 9', 12'; Nyström 31'; Lundin 59' (pen.); Karlsson 72'	Report		Stadium: Tingvalla Idrottsplats; Attendance: 5,602; Referee: Kolbjørn Dæhlen (Norway)

14 June Friendly; DBU 50th Anniversary Tournament; Semifinal	Norway	1–0	Sweden	Copenhagen, Denmark
19:00 (UTC+1)	Martinsen 83'	Report		Stadium: Københavns Idrætspark; Attendance: 18,000; Referee: Alfred Birlem (Germany)

17 September 1937–47 Nordic Championship	Norway	2–3	Sweden	Aker, Norway
13:15 (UTC+1)	Navestad 8' (pen.); Yven 84'	Report	Nyberg 19', 73'; Lennartsson 81'	Stadium: Ullevaal Stadion; Attendance: 29,504; Referee: Einer Ulrich (Denmark)

1 October 1937–47 Nordic Championship	Sweden	4–1	Denmark	Stockholm, Sweden
14:00 (UTC+1:00)	Lennartsson 35'; Johansson 43'; Nyström 57'; Dahl 84'	Report	Jørgensen 7'	Stadium: Råsunda; Attendance: 22,698; Referee: Dæhlen (Norway)
