= List of Finland international footballers =

The following list of Finland international footballers covers all football players with 30 or more official caps for the Finland national football team. The players are listed here sorted first by the total number of caps, and then by last name.

== Key ==
	Still active for the national team.
Caps	Appearances
Pos	Positions
GK	Goalkeeper
DF	Defender
MF	Midfielder
FW	Forward

== List of players ==
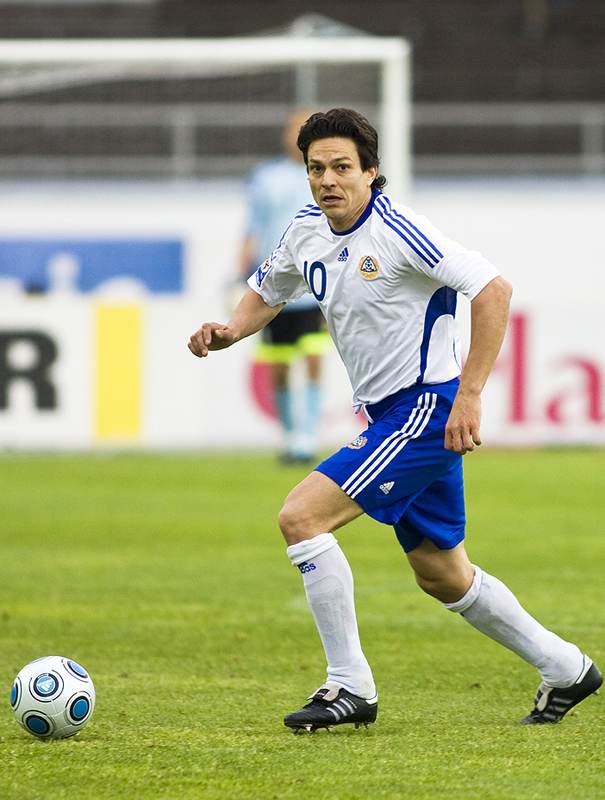
Jari Litmanen made 137 appearances for the national team during 1989–2010.

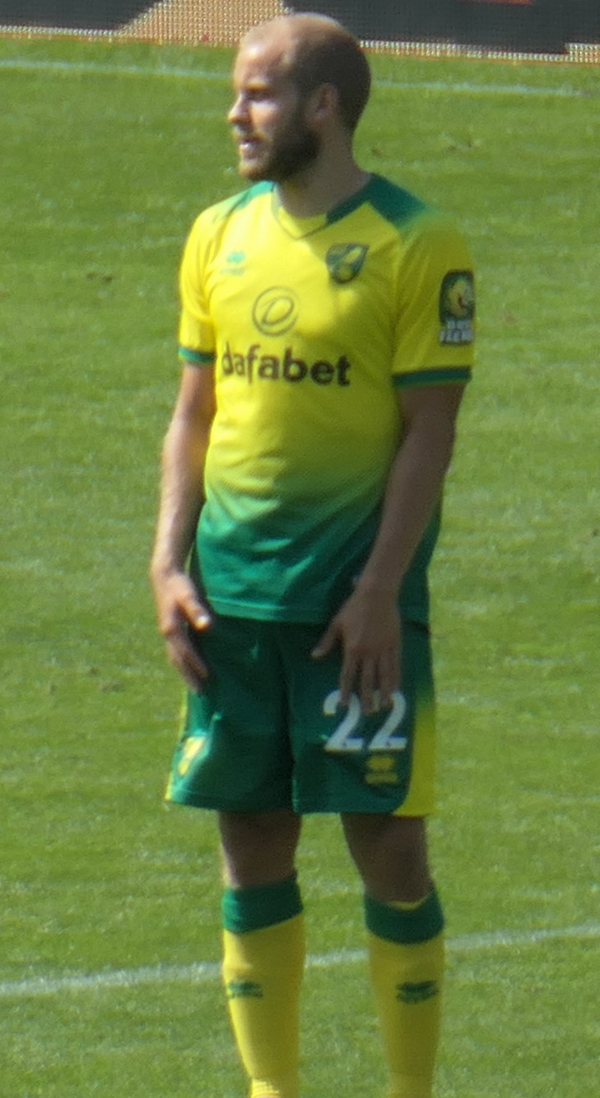
Teemu Pukki is the top goalscorer of the national team with 43 goals in his 133 international appearances.

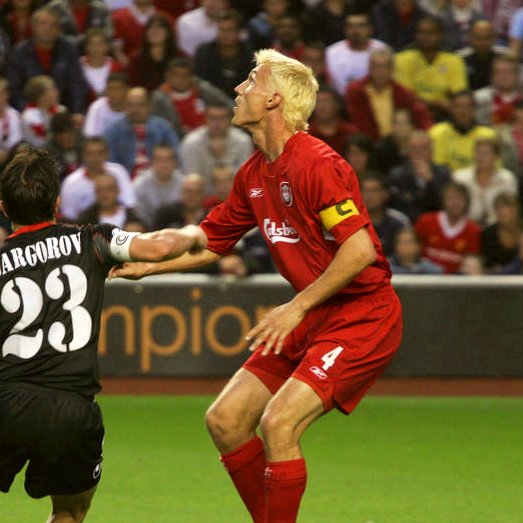
Sami Hyypiä made 105 appearances in the national team during 1992–2010.

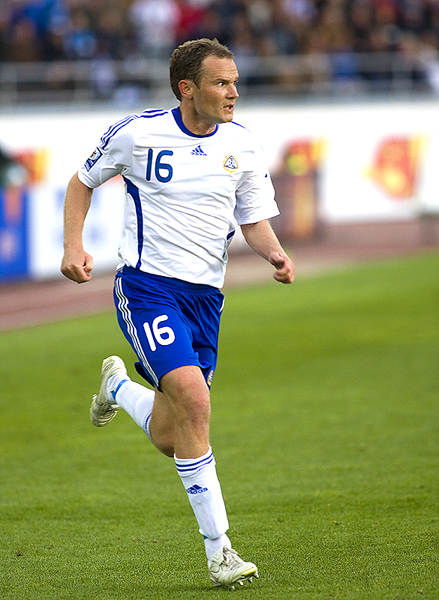
Jonatan Johansson made 105 appearances for the national team during 1996–2010.

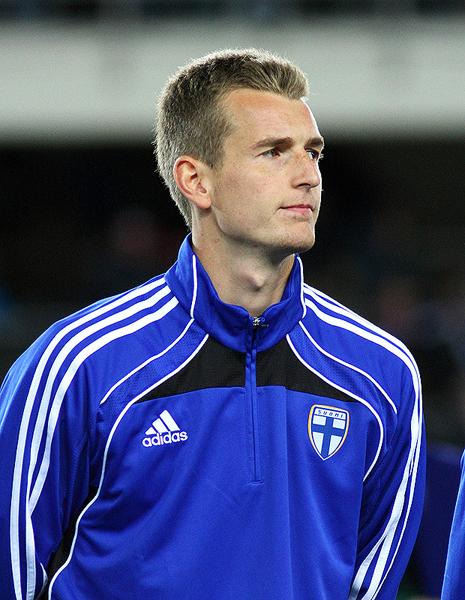
Lukas Hradecky has 103 caps in the national team.

As of 7 March 2026.

Player	Pos	Caps	Goals	First	Last
Jari Litmanen	FW	137	32	1989	2010
Teemu Pukki	FW	133	43	2009	2025
Sami Hyypiä	DF	105	5	1992	2010
Jonatan Johansson	FW	105	22	1996	2010
Lukáš Hrádecký	GK	103	0	2010	2026
Ari Hjelm	FW	100	20	1983	1996
Joonas Kolkka	FW	98	11	1994	2010
Mikael Forssell	FW	87	29	1999	2014
Joel Pohjanpalo	FW	87	19	2012	2026
Tim Sparv	MF	84	1	2009	2021
Erkka Petäjä	DF	84	0	1983	1994
Robin Lod	FW	83	6	2013	2025
Rasmus Schüller	MF	79	0	2013	2024
Joona Toivio	DF	78	3	2011	2021
Arto Tolsa	DF	77	10	1964	1981
Petri Pasanen	DF	76	1	2000	2013
Hannu Tihinen	DF	76	5	1997	2010
Toni Kuivasto	DF	75	1	1997	2009
Jere Uronen	DF	75	1	2012	2025
Roman Eremenko	MF	73	5	2007	2016
Mika Nurmela	MF	71	4	1992	2008
Mixu Paatelainen	FW	70	18	1986	2000
Glen Kamara	MF	70	2	2017	2025
Esko Ranta	DF	69	0	1971	1980
Aki Riihilahti	MF	69	11	1998	2007
Juhani Peltonen	MF	68	11	1955	1970
Antti Niemi	GK	67	0	1992	2007
Hannu Turunen	DF	66	3	1979	1987
Teemu Tainio	MF	64	6	1998	2014
Mika Väyrynen	MF	64	5	2002	2015
Kasper Hämäläinen	FW	63	9	2008	2019
Shefki Kuqi	FW	62	7	1999	2010
Miikka Toivola	DF	62	4	1968	1980
Niklas Moisander	DF	62	2	2008	2017
Markus Heikkinen	MF	61	0	2002	2011
Olli Huttunen	GK	61	0	1980	1992
Stig-Göran Myntti	MF	61	5	1945	1958
Jukka Raitala	DF	61	0	2009	2021
Erik Holmgren	DF	60	2	1986	1995
Marko Myyry	MF	60	2	1986	1996
Esa Pekonen	DF	60	2	1981	1989
Jukka Ikäläinen	MF	59	3	1980	1989
Markku Kanerva	MF	59	1	1986	1995
Kari Ukkonen	MF	59	4	1983	1996
Paulus Arajuuri	FW	58	3	2010	2021
Alexei Eremenko	MF	57	14	2003	2013
Kari Arkivuo	DF	57	1	2005	2017
Frans Karjagin	DF	57	0	1929	1941
Veikko Asikainen	MF	56	0	1938	1955
Jari Europaeus	DF	56	0	1983	1991
Jussi Jääskeläinen	GK	56	0	1998	2010
Aki Lahtinen	DF	56	0	1979	1989
Pertti Mäkipää	DF	56	2	1962	1970
Kai Pahlman	FW	56	13	1954	1968
Jouko Suomalainen	MF	54	2	1970	1978
Ari Heikkinen	DF	51	1	1989	1994
William Kanerva	MF	50	13	1922	1938
Max Viinioksa	DF	50	1	1926	1935
Perparim Hetemaj	MF	49	4	2009	2017
Toni Kallio	DF	49	2	2000	2010
Kari Laukkanen	GK	49	0	1985	1996
Nikolai Alho	DF	49	0	2014	2026
Leo Houtsonen	MF	48	1	1978	1986
Timo Kautonen	MF	47	0	1964	1976
Matti Paatelainen	FW	47	11	1970	1977
Ari Valvee	FW	47	8	1980	1989
Mika Lipponen	FW	46	11	1983	1991
Jyrki Nieminen	MF	46	9	1976	1986
Pyry Soiri	DF	45	7	2017	2024
Jarkko Wiss	MF	45	3	1996	2007
Harri Ylönen	DF	45	1	1995	2002
Kalevi Lehtovirta	FW	44	12	1947	1959
Alexander Ring	MF	44	2	2011	2017
Gunnar Åström	FW	43	16	1923	1937
Tommy Lindholm	FW	43	11	1965	1974
Erkki Vihtilä	MF	43	0	1971	1979
Robert Ivanov	DF	43	0	2019	2025
Hjalmar Kelin	FW	42	7	1920	1928
Arvo Närvänen	FW	42	1	1924	1937
Janne Saarinen	DF	42	0	2000	2008
Olavi Rissanen	FW	40	7	1969	1979
Eino Soinio	MF	40	2	1912	1927
Peter Kopteff	DF	39	1	2000	2006
Pauno Kymäläinen	DF	39	0	1975	1985
Kaarlo Oksanen	DF	39	0	1929	1937
Kim Suominen	MF	39	4	1993	1996
Aulis Koponen	FW	38	16	1924	1935
Antti Sumiala	FW	38	9	1992	2004
Benjamin Källman	FW	37	10	2018	2025
Fredrik Jensen	DF	37	8	2017	2025
Erik Beijar	MF	37	4	1948	1964
Ernst Grönlund	FW	37	11	1931	1940
Lars Näsman	GK	37	0	1965	1971
Aulis Rytkönen	MF	37	7	1948	1964
Daniel Sjölund	MF	37	2	2003	2012
Kari Virtanen	MF	37	1	1979	1986
Tommi Grönlund	MF	36	2	1995	2002
Petri Järvinen	MF	36	4	1989	1996
Ismo Lius	MF	36	4	1984	1990
Kurt Martin	DF	36	0	1945	1954
Jari Rantanen	MF	36	4	1983	1989
Matti Mäkelä	MF	35	2	1961	1972
Kurt Weckström	FW	35	10	1931	1943
Jorma Vaihela	MF	34	13	1947	1954
Robert Taylor	FW	34	2	2017	2024
Janne Lindberg	MF	34	1	1993	1996
Ilkka Remes	DF	34	1	1982	1992
Pasi Tauriainen	MF	34	1	1986	1993
Seppo Kilponen	DF	34	0	1966	1971
Markus Halsti	DF	33	0	2008	2018
Veli Lampi	DF	33	0	2006	2015
Semi Nuoranen	MF	33	2	1961	1972
Kimmo Tarkkio	FW	33	3	1986	1992
Verner Eklöf	FW	32	17	1919	1927
Aki Heiskanen	MF	32	7	1974	1978
Raimo Saviomaa	DF	32	0	1968	1974
Simo Valakari	MF	32	0	1996	2003
Mika Kottila	FW	31	6	1998	2004
Pentti Larvo	FW	31	4	1929	1937
Jarl Malmgren	MF	31	6	1928	1938
Juhani Ojala	DF	31	1	2011	2021
Viljo Halme	GK	30	0	1932	1939
Jari Ilola	MF	30	1	1998	2007
Seppo Pyykkö	FW	30	1	1976	1981
