= 1929 Finnish football championship =

Finnish football championship
- Season: 1929
- Champions: HPS (5th Finnish title)
- ...

The 1929 Finnish football championship was the 21st season of Finnish football. This was the last time the championship was organized in tournament form before the foundation of the Mestaruussarja.

A total of 22 teams took part in the competition with Helsingin Palloseura and IFK Helsingfors meeting in the final.

== Quarterfinals ==
Team 1	Score	Team 2
TPS	4-2	HJK
HPS	8-4	VPS
TaPa	1-7	IFK Helsingfors
Sudet	3-3; 2-1	ViPS

== Semifinals ==
Team 1	Score	Team 2
TPS	2-4	HPS
IFK Helsingfors	6-2	Sudet

== Final ==
September 29, 1929

HPS	4-0	IFK Helsingfors
V. Kuhlberg; W. Kanerva; A. Koponen

Töölön Pallokenttä 2, Helsinki, Finland

HPS	IFK Helsingfors

HPS: (Finland) Paavo Karhunmaa (Finland) Niilo Koskinen (Finland) Kaarlo Oksanen (Finland) Max Viinioksa (Finland) Pentti Larvo (Finland) Lauri Sinikari (Finland) Bertil Silve (Finland) Aulis Koponen (Finland) Sulo Saario (Finland) Viljo Kuhlberg (Finland) William Kanerva On team earlier in the season: (Finland) Jaakko Itkonen (Finland) Axel Nyström

Finnish championship
1929 Winners
HPS
5th Title
