= John Österholm =

John Österholm may refer to:

- John Österholm (politician)
- John Österholm (footballer)
