= Mixu Paatelainen =

Finnish footballer and manager (born 1967)

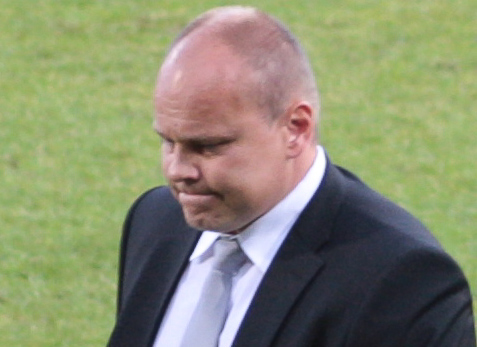
- Paatelainen in August 2011

Personal information
- Full name: Mika-Matti Petteri Paatelainen
- Date of birth: 3 February 1967 (age 59)
- Place of birth: Helsinki, Finland
- Height: 1.83 m (6 ft 0 in)
- Position: Striker

Team information
- Current team: The Spartans (sporting director)

Senior career*
Years	Team	Apps	(Gls)
1985–1987	Haka	48	(18)
1987–1992	Dundee United	133	(33)
1992–1994	Aberdeen	75	(23)
1994–1997	Bolton Wanderers	69	(15)
1997–1998	Wolverhampton Wanderers	23	(0)
1998–2001	Hibernian	93	(32)
2001–2002	Strasbourg	7	(0)
2002–2003	Hibernian	24	(7)
2003–2004	St Johnstone	33	(11)
2004–2005	St Mirren	16	(4)
2005	Cowdenbeath	1	(0)
Total		522	(143)

International career
1989–2000	Finland	70	(18)

Managerial career
- 2005–2006: Cowdenbeath
- 2006–2007: TPS
- 2008–2009: Hibernian
- 2010–2011: Kilmarnock
- 2011–2015: Finland
- 2015–2016: Dundee United
- 2018: Ubon UMT United
- 2018: Latvia
- 2019–2021: Hong Kong
- 2022: HIFK
- * Club domestic league appearances and goals

Mika-Matti Petteri "Mixu" Paatelainen (born 3 February 1967) is a Finnish professional football manager and former player who is currently the sporting director of Scottish League Two club The Spartans. A striker, he scored 18 goals in 70 appearances for the Finnish national team, which makes him Finland's all time thirteenth most capped player and fifth top goalscorer.

Paatelainen had a 20-year playing career, playing for nine clubs in four countries. Most of his career was spent in Scotland, with Dundee United, Aberdeen, Hibernian, St Johnstone and St Mirren. He also played for Haka in Finland, Bolton Wanderers and Wolverhampton Wanderers in England and Strasbourg in France. While at Bolton, Paatelainen became the first Finn to play in the Premier League.

After retiring as a player in 2005, Paatelainen became the manager of Scottish club Cowdenbeath, where he helped the club win the Scottish Football League Third Division, earning promotion. After a season coaching in his native Finland with TPS, Paatelainen returned to Scotland as manager of Hibernian. He left that position by mutual consent after 18 months. After a year out of the game, Paatelainen was appointed manager of Kilmarnock, where he was manager for less than one season. He was appointed manager of the Finland national team in March 2011, a position he held until June 2015. He was appointed as Dundee United manager in October 2015, parting company with the club in May 2016 after their relegation to the Scottish Championship. He has subsequently managed Ubon UMT United in Thailand, and the national teams of Latvia and Hong Kong.

After his playing career, Paatelainen has also worked for FIFA and UEFA as a technical observer.

== Club career ==
Paatelainen made his debut for Haka in 1985. He played 48 league matches for Haka, scoring 18 goals. During his debut season, Haka won the Finnish Cup, the only honour of the club during his time there.

In October 1987, Scottish Premier Division club Dundee United signed him for a £100,000 transfer fee. He scored on his debut a day later and quickly established himself as a first team regular, scoring eleven goals in his first season, including four goals in a 7–0 rout of Morton in April 1988. Paatelainen also helped Dundee United reach the Scottish Cup Final in May 1988, although he had to settle for a runners-up medal, as United lost 2–1 to Celtic. He was the club's top scorer for the following two seasons, and in total scored 47 times in 173 matches for United.

In March 1992, he transferred to Aberdeen for £400,000. During the three seasons he stayed there, he scored 23 goals in 75 matches. Paatelainen played in two cup finals during his time at Pittodrie, but lost to Rangers in October 1992 in the League Cup Final and in May 1993 lost to the same opposition in the Scottish Cup Final.

Paatelainen transferred in 1994 to English club Bolton Wanderers. The team was promoted to the Premier League in his first season with the club, which then meant that Paatelainen became the first Finnish footballer to play in the Premier League (as the old First Division had been rebranded in 1992). He played a crucial part in the promotion triumph, putting Bolton 3–2 ahead in their playoff final clash with Reading in extra time on their way to a 4–3 victory which ended a 15-year exile from the top flight.

Paatelainen also played in the 1995 League Cup Final, in which Wanderers were beaten 2–1 by Liverpool. He was unable to keep Bolton in the Premier League in 1995–96, although they did return the next season by winning the Division One title with 100 goals and 98 points. He then played for Wolverhampton Wanderers during the 1997–98 season. He failed to score for Wolves in the league but scored four times in their FA Cup run, with goals against Darlington (two), Charlton Athletic and Wimbledon. He also scored once in the League Cup, against Queens Park Rangers.

After his spell in Wolverhampton, Paatelainen decided to return to Scotland in the summer of 1998; this time signing for Edinburgh club Hibernian. Hibs had been relegated the previous season, and Paatelainen's twelve goals in his first season helped his side get promotion back to the top division in Scotland. He is fondly remembered by Hibernian supporters for his hat-trick in a 6–2 victory over Edinburgh derby rivals Heart of Midlothian on 22 October 2000. Paatelainien's appearance for Hibs in their 2001 Scottish Cup Final defeat by Celtic meant that he became the first player to play in the Scottish Cup final with three clubs. Despite this, Paatelainien never collected a winners medal in the competition. Paatelainen left Hibs in 2001 to sign for French club Strasbourg. He then returned to Hibs for one season, where he combined his playing duties with coaching the youths.

In 2003, he transferred to St Johnstone, when Hibs no longer wished to extend his contract, also acting as an assistant manager. Paatelainen only stayed with St Johnstone for one season. Paatelainen then transferred to St Mirren, where he also served as an assistant manager. This was his last club. During his playing career, Paatelainen scored 143 league goals.

== International career ==
Paatelainen played 70 matches for Finland, scoring 18 goals. He played his first international match on 9 September 1986, against East Germany. One of his feats in the national team was scoring four goals in a single match against San Marino, which stands as a record number of goals in one match for Finland. He retired from international football in 2000. In addition to his appearances for the senior national team, Paatelainen also played eight matches each for the Finland under-21s and the under-19s.

== Coaching career ==
=== Cowdenbeath ===
Having previously worked as a coach while still playing for St Johnstone and St Mirren, Paatelainen was appointed full-time manager of Scottish Third Division part-time football team Cowdenbeath in August 2005. In his first season, he guided the Blue Brazil to their first league title in 67 years. He signed his brothers Markus and Mikko for the club.

=== TPS ===
On 21 October 2006, Paatelainen resigned as manager of Cowdenbeath to join Finnish club TPS. He guided TPS to third place and UEFA Intertoto Cup qualification in what was to be his only season in charge.

=== Hibernian ===
Paatelainen was linked with the managerial vacancy at former club Hibernian in December 2007, and he was appointed on 10 January 2008. He commented upon taking the job that he wanted to make Hibs play a bit more direct, which he later claimed was misinterpreted as him wanting to play a long ball game. Paatelainen took the Hibs job at a time when they had only won one of their previous ten games and had slipped into the bottom half of the Scottish Premier League. Hibs’ results initially improved under Paatelainen and the club secured a place in the top half of the league.

During the 2008–09 season, Paatelainen came under increasing pressure from Hibs fans due to poor results and his favouring of a 4–3–3 system. Paatelainen eventually abandoned 4–3–3 in favour of a more orthodox 4–4–2 system. He was criticised by Abdessalam Benjelloun, who accused Paatelainen of favouring outdated long ball tactics. Paatelainen responded by saying that Benjelloun was "frustrated" at not being a regular pick for club or country. A poor run of results early in 2009 led to many Hibs supporters calling for Paatelainen to be sacked, but he did manage to lead the team into the top half of the league again. Paatelainen was also praised by the media for his tactical approach in winning the last Edinburgh derby of the season, but he left the job by mutual consent at the end of May after a disappointing season.

=== Kilmarnock ===
After a year out of the game, Paatelainen was appointed manager of Kilmarnock on 23 June 2010. Paatelainen earned plaudits from the Scottish media for his work with Kilmarnock. In November 2010, he was linked with the head coach position of the Finland national football team. Paatelainen won the manager of the month award for December 2010, as Kilmarnock continued their good start with two league wins, against Hibernian and Inverness CT, and a draw at Celtic Park. Kilmarnock offered him a long-term contract in March 2011, in an attempt to frustrate interest in Paatelainen from Scunthorpe United. The approach from Scunthorpe was rejected by Paatelainen, but soon afterwards he accepted an offer from Finland. Despite having left Kilmarnock in March, Paatelainen won the SFWA Manager of the Year award for the 2010–11 season.

=== Finland national team ===
Following a bad start by Finland in UEFA Euro 2012 qualifying and their decline in the FIFA World Rankings from 33 to 86, head coach Stuart Baxter was sacked. Paatelainen was appointed as the new Finland head coach on 31 March 2011. His first match as a head coach was a 1–0 away win against San Marino on 3 June, but Finland then suffered a 5–0 defeat by Sweden in his second game. Both matches were part of the UEFA Euro 2012 qualifying process.

Paatelainen's deal with the Finnish Football Association extended to 2016, covering not only the UEFA Euro 2012 qualifiers but also the FIFA World Cup 2014 and the UEFA Euro 2016 qualifiers. As Finland was already eliminated from UEFA Euro 2012, Paatelainen's task was to renew the national team and try to qualify for one or more of the tournaments during his projected tenure as Finland's head coach. On 14 June 2015 Paatelainen was sacked following his fourth defeat in a row during the UEFA Euro 2016 qualifying campaign.

=== Dundee United ===
Paatelainen was announced as the new head coach of Dundee United in October 2015, having signed a contract until 2018. His first match in charge of the club was a 1–0 defeat to Hearts at Tannadice. He was unable to prevent the side from relegation, which was confirmed by a Dundee derby defeat on 2 May 2016, and he left United two days later.

=== Latvia national team ===
Paatelainen was appointed head coach of the Latvia national team in May 2018. On 4 December, he announced that he won't continue as the head coach of the team after his contract expires at the end of the month.

=== Hong Kong national team ===
Paatelainen was appointed as the head coach of the Hong Kong representative team in April 2019 on a two-year contract, succeeding Gary White.

Hong Kong was drawn in group C of the 2022 Fifa World Cup qualification AFC Second round along with Iran, Iraq, Bahrain and Cambodia. The team earned a 2-0 win over Cambodia and draws against Cambodia and Bahrain before the qualifiers were halted due to the COVID-19 pandemic after six matches.

Hong Kong was one of the few countries and territories in the World to pursue a Zero Covid Elimination strategy. Due to this the Hong Kong Representative Team was unable to prepare and train for the remaining World Cup qualifiers played in Bahrain in early June 2021. Paatelainen's initial contract was extended to cover the remaining qualifying matches.

Paatelainen's contract expired after the World Cup qualifiers and he decided to return to Europe.

=== HIFK ===
After manager Bernardo Tavares resigned, Finnish Veikkausliiga club HIFK appointed Paatelainen as their manager. Before his appointment the club had lost in the quarter-final of the Finnish League Cup and earned just one point from the first two matches of the league season.

Only two months later the club released a statement of a possible bankruptcy. This lack of finances affected the team’s campaign significantly resulting in relegation from the Finnish Veikkausliiga. Nevertheless Paatelainen guided HIFK into the semi finals of the Finnish Cup for the first time in 63 years.

Once HIFK's relegation was confirmed after a defeat against VPS, Paatelainen stated at a press conference that he would not carry on his managerial duties at HIFK beyond the end of the season. He subsequently resigned a few days later.

=== The Spartans (sporting director) ===
On 30 April 2025, Paatelainen was appointed the sporting director of Scottish club The Spartans.

== In popular culture ==
Paatelainen's time at Bolton Wanderers led to him being mentioned in the comedy show Phoenix Nights, which was set in the Bolton area. This happened when the doormen Max & Paddy drunkenly made a prank call to their boss Brian Potter, claiming that Paatelainen worked at the Coroner's office in Bolton and that the club was on fire.

== Career statistics ==
=== Club ===
Appearances and goals by club, season and competition
Club	Season	League			National Cup		League Cup		Continental		Total	
Club	Season	Division	Apps	Goals	Apps	Goals	Apps	Goals	Apps	Goals	Apps	Goals
Haka	1985	Mestaruussarja	11	5	*	*	—		—		11	5
Haka	1986	Mestaruussarja	19	6	*	*	—		—		19	6
Haka	1987	Mestaruussarja	18	7	*	*	—		—		18	7
Haka	Total		48	18			—		—		48	18
Dundee United	1987–88	Scottish Premier Division	19	9	6	2	0	0	—		25	11
Dundee United	1988–89	Scottish Premier Division	33	10	6	4	3	3	3	0	45	17
Dundee United	1989–90	Scottish Premier Division	31	7	2	1	2	0	3	1	38	9
Dundee United	1990–91	Scottish Premier Division	20	1	1	0	2	0	3	0	26	1
Dundee United	1991–92	Scottish Premier Division	30	6	2	1	3	2	0	0	35	9
Dundee United	Total		133	33	17	8	10	5	9	1	169	47
Aberdeen	1991–92	Scottish Premier Division	6	1	0	0	0	0	—		6	1
Aberdeen	1992–93	Scottish Premier Division	33	16	6	1	2	3	—		41	20
Aberdeen	1993–94	Scottish Premier Division	36	6	3	0	2	0	3	1	44	7
Aberdeen	Total		75	23	9	1	4	3	3	1	91	28
Bolton Wanderers	1994–95	First Division	44	12	1	0	8	2	—		53	14
Bolton Wanderers	1995–96	Premier League	15	1	1	0	1	0	—		17	1
Bolton Wanderers	1996–97	First Division	10	2	0	0	0	0	—		10	2
Bolton Wanderers	Total		69	15	2	0	9	2	—		80	17
Wolverhampton Wanderers	1997–98	First Division	23	0	5	4	5	1	—		33	5
Hibernian	1998–99	Scottish First Division	26	12	2	0	0	0	—		28	12
Hibernian	1999–2000	Scottish Premier League	31	9	4	1	0	0	—		35	10
Hibernian	2000–01	Scottish Premier League	36	11	5	1	2	0	—		43	12
Hibernian	Total		93	32	11	2	2	0	0	0	106	34
Strasbourg	2001–02	Division 2	7	0	*	*	*	*	1	0	8	0
Hibernian	2002–03	Scottish Premier League	24	7	3	0	2	0	—		29	7
St Johnstone	2003–04	Scottish First Division	33	11	1	0	3	2	—		37	13
St Mirren	2004–05	Scottish First Division	16	4	0	0	1	1	—		17	5
Career total			521	143	48	15	36	14	13	2	618	174

- Asterisk (*) indicates that more matches and goals may yet emerge as cup records are investigated.

=== International goals ===
Win Draw Loss

No.	Date	Home team	Visiting team	Goals	Score	Result	Venue	Competition
1.	11 January 1988	Czechoslovakia	Finland	14' 1–0 (pen.)	2–0	Loss	Estadio Insular, Maspalomas, Gran Canaria, Spain	Friendly
2.	19 October 1988	Wales	Finland	45' 2–2	2–2	Draw	Vetch Field, Swansea, Wales	FIFA World Cup 1990 qualification
3.	11 January 1989	Egypt	Finland	14' 1–1	2–1	Loss	El-Mahalla El-Kubra, Egypt	Friendly
4.	11 November 1991	Tunisia	Finland	43' 0–1	1–2	Win	Tunis, Tunisia	Friendly
5.	13 March 1991	Poland	Finland	20' 1–1	1–1	Draw	Stadion Wojska Polskiego, Warsaw, Poland	Friendly
6.	13 May 1993	Finland	Austria	18' 1–0	3–1	Win	Urheilupuisto, Turku, Finland	FIFA World Cup 1994 qualification
7.	16 November 1994	Finland	Faroe Islands	75' 4–0	5–0	Win	Helsinki Olympic Stadium, Finland	UEFA Euro 1996 qualification
8.	16 November 1994	Finland	Faroe Islands	85' 5–0	5–0	Win	Helsinki Olympic Stadium, Finland	UEFA Euro 1996 qualification
9.	14 December 1994	Finland	San Marino	24' 1–0	4–1	Win	Helsinki Olympic Stadium, Finland	UEFA Euro 1996 qualification
10.	14 December 1994	Finland	San Marino	30' 2–0	4–1	Win	Helsinki Olympic Stadium, Finland	UEFA Euro 1996 qualification
11.	14 December 1994	Finland	San Marino	86' 3–1	4–1	Win	Helsinki Olympic Stadium, Finland	UEFA Euro 1996 qualification
12.	14 December 1994	Finland	San Marino	90' 4–1	4–1	Win	Helsinki Olympic Stadium, Finland	UEFA Euro 1996 qualification
13.	26 April 1995	Faroe Islands	Finland	75' 0–2	0–4	Win	Svangaskarð, Toftir, Faroese Islands	UEFA Euro 1996 qualification
14.	2 April 1997	Azerbaijan	Finland	64' 0–2	1–2	Win	Tofik Bakhramov Stadium, Baku, Azerbaijan	FIFA World Cup 1998 qualification
15.	5 September 1998	Finland	Moldova	63' 3–2	3–2	Win	Helsinki Olympic Stadium, Finland	UEFA Euro 2000 qualification
16.	14 October 1998	Turkey	Finland	6' 0–1	1–3	Win	Ali Sami Yen Stadium, Istanbul, Turkey	UEFA Euro 2000 qualification
17.	28 April 1999	Slovenia	Finland	22' 0–1 (pen.)	1–1	Draw	Bežigrad Central Stadium, Ljubljana, Slovenia	Friendly
18.	5 June 1999	Finland	Turkey	14' 2–0	2–4	Loss	Helsinki Olympic Stadium, Finland	UEFA Euro 2000 qualification

== Managerial statistics ==
As of match played 2 October 2022

Team	Nat	From	To	Record							
Team	Nat	From	To	G	W	D	L	GF	GA	GD	Win %
Cowdenbeath	(Scotland)	1 July 2005	1 October 2006	51	29	7	15	111	62	+49	56.86
TPS	(Finland)	1 October 2006	10 January 2008	34	15	5	14	57	41	+16	44.12
Hibernian	(Scotland)	10 January 2008	29 May 2009	62	19	18	25	68	74	−6	30.65
Kilmarnock	(Scotland)	23 June 2010	31 March 2011	34	15	6	13	55	44	+11	44.12
Finland	(Finland)	31 March 2011	15 June 2015	44	17	9	18	59	62	−3	38.64
Dundee United	(Scotland)	14 October 2015	4 May 2016	30	8	4	18	33	52	−19	26.67
Ubon UMT United	(Thailand)	13 January 2018	22 April 2018	11	2	1	8	12	18	−6	18.18
Latvia	(Latvia)	10 May 2018	4 December 2018	9	1	5	3	5	10	−5	11.11
Hong Kong	(Hong Kong)	9 April 2019	30 June 2021	12	1	2	9	4	24	−20	8.33
HIFK	(Finland)	17 April 2022	5 October 2022	22	1	5	16	17	61	−44	4.55
Total				309	108	62	139	421	448	−27	34.95

== Honours ==
=== Player ===
Valkeakosken Haka

- Finnish Cup: 1985

Bolton Wanderers

- Football League First Division: 1996–97; play-offs: 1995
- Football League Cup runner-up: 1994–95

Hibernian

- Scottish First Division: 1998–99

=== Manager ===
Cowdenbeath

- Scottish Third Division: 2005–06

Latvia

- Baltic Cup: 2018

Individual

- Scottish Premier League Player of the Month: October 2000
- Scottish Premier League Manager of the Month: February 2008, March 2009, December 2010
- Scottish Premier League Manager of the Season: 2010–11
