= Willi Rutz =

German footballer and manager

Personal information
- Full name: Willi Rutz
- Date of birth: 7 January 1907
- Place of birth: German Empire
- Date of death: 20 November 1993 (aged 86)
- Place of death: Germany
- Position: Inside left

Senior career*
Years	Team	Apps	(Gls)
1925–1929	VfB Stuttgart		
1929–1931	Rot-Weiss Frankfurt		
1932–1941	VfB Stuttgart		
1943–1944	HSV Groß Born		

International career
1932	Germany	1	(1)

Managerial career
- 1931–1932: Stuttgarter Kickers (co-manager)
- 1933: VfB Stuttgart (player-manager)
- * Club domestic league appearances and goals

Willi Rutz (7 January 1907 – 20 November 1993), nicknamed Knölle, was a German footballer and manager who played as an inside left and made one appearance for the Germany national team.

== Career ==
Rutz earned his first and only cap for Germany on 1 July 1932, in a friendly against Finland. He scored Germany's second goal to give the team a 2–1 lead in the match, which was played in Helsinki and finished as a 4–1 win.

== Personal life ==
Rutz died on 20 November 1993, at the age of 86.

== Career statistics ==
=== International ===
Germany
Year	Apps	Goals
1932	1	0
Total	1	0

=== International goals ===
No.	Date	Venue	Opponent	Score	Result	Competition
1	1 July 1932	Töölön Pallokenttä, Helsinki, Finland	Finland	2–1	4–1	Friendly
