= Yrjö Suontausta =

Finnish jurist and politician (1901–1952)

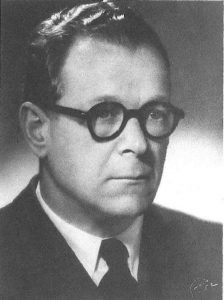
Yrjö Suontausta

Yrjö Erland Suontausta (9 December 1901 – 11 May 1952) was a Finnish jurist, politician and footballer, born in Turku. He was a member of the Parliament of Finland from 1945 to 1947, representing the National Progressive Party. He was a member of the Supreme Court of Finland from 1947 until his death in 1952. He played as a forward for Turun Palloseura.
