= Paul Jerima =

Finnish footballer, sprinter, and graphic designer

Personal information
- Date of birth: 29 December 1892
- Place of birth: Helsinki, Grand Duchy of Finland
- Date of death: 30 August 1954 (aged 61)
- Place of death: Helsinki, Finland
- Position: Forward

Senior career*
Years	Team	Apps	(Gls)
	HIFK	–	(–)
	Sport	–	(–)

International career
1911	Finland	1	(1)
- * Club domestic league appearances and goals

Paul Jerima (born Jefimow, also known as Jefimoff, 29 December 1892 – 30 August 1954) was a Finnish footballer, sprinter and graphic designer.

== Life ==
=== Sports career ===
Jerima won the 100 m and 200 m Finnish Championship in 1913, 1914 and 1915, but was later stripped of the titles as he held Russian citizenship. After being granted Finnish citizenship, Jerima won the 1919 Championship titles on 4 × 100 m and 4 × 400 m relays representing HIFK.

Jerima played football for HIFK Helsinki and Sport Helsinki. In 1911, he was a member of the Finland squad in their first international scoring Finland's second goal on the 5–2 loss against Sweden.

=== Illustrator ===
Jerima studied at the Academy of Fine Arts and the University of Art and Design. Since 1918, he worked as a graphic designer for the printing company Öflund & Petterson which was soon merged with Tilgmann. In 1931, Jerima was named as Tilgmann's art director and 1945 the vice director. As an illustrator, Jerima is best known of his Christmas cards signed with the initials ″JEF″.
