= Yrjö Kylmälä =

Finnish footballer (born 1911)

Personal information
- Date of birth: 20 September 1911
- Date of death: 14 October 1982 (aged 71)
- Position: Forward

International career
Years	Team	Apps	(Gls)
1934–1939	Finland	7	(5)

Yrjö Kylmälä (20 September 1911 – 14 October 1982) was a Finnish footballer. He played in seven matches for the Finland national football team from 1934 to 1939. He was also part of Finland's squad for the football tournament at the 1936 Summer Olympics, but he did not play in any matches.
