= Max Seemann =

Austrian football referee

- Born: 30 November 1892; Ostrava, Austria-Hungary
- Died: 20 February 1939 (aged 46)

Domestic
Years	League	Role
?–1924	Austrian First Class	Referee

International
Years	League	Role
1916–24	FIFA listed	Referee
Association football career
Managerial career
- Years: Team
- 1924–1925: Wiener AC
- 1927: Wiener AC
- 1935: DFC Prag

Max Seemann (30 November 1892 – 20 February 1939) was an Austrian businessman and football referee who officiated five international matches between 1916 and 1924.

== Early life ==
Born in Ostrava on 30 November 1892, Seemann immigrated to Vienna, where he opened a sports shop in Annagasse.

== Refereeing career ==
A sports lover, he soon began working as a football referee, officiating several matches in the Austrian First Class, and eventually, he not only became the treasurer of the referees' committee, but also the president of the football department of the Wiener Amateur-SV, which later became Austria Wien. In 1916, the Austrian Referees Committee nominated him as an international referee, thus becoming a member of FIFA. As such, he officiated a total of 5 international matches between 1916 and 1924, all friendies.

In his international debut on 5 November 1916, the 23-year-old Seemann officiated a friendly match between Austria and Hungary in Vienna, which ended in a 3–3 draw. His refereeing was marred by scandal, however, since in the 70th minute, with the game already tied at 3, Seemann disallowed a possible winner from Hungary scored by Kálmán Konrád due to offside, a decision highly protested by Alfréd Schaffer, who was thus sent off, but he refused to leave the field, with the Hungarian captain Ferenc Csüdör supporting his teammate's decision. Some sources state that the Hungarian team walked out in protest, while others state that the game was stopped a few minutes later due to darkness.

Seemann went on to officiate a further four matches, including two more of the Hungarian national team in 1923 and 1924, with the Magyar winning both. When professional football was introduced in Austria in 1924, he retired from his refereeing career to become a paid coach at the Wiener AC, which he co-managed alongside August Huber. Three years later, in 1927, he briefly served as Wiener's sole coach. In 1935, he was appointed as the coach of DFC Prag.

== Later life and death ==
As a Jew, Seemann was persecuted by the Nazi regime, so he decided to leave Vienna in September 1938, which proved to be in vain since he ended up dying anyway in Belgrade just six months later, on 20 February 1939, at the age of 46, just a few months before the outbreak of the First World War.
