= Lennart Bunke =

Swedish footballer (1912–1988)

Personal information
- Full name: Sten Lennart Bunke
- Birth name: Sten Lennart Andersson
- Date of birth: 3 April 1912
- Place of birth: Höganäs, Sweden
- Date of death: 17 August 1988 (aged 76)
- Place of death: Spain
- Position: Forward

Youth career
- Höganäs BK

Senior career*
Years	Team	Apps	(Gls)
1932–1935	Helsingborgs IF		
1935–1937	IFK Eskilstuna		
1937–1939	Helsingborgs IF		

International career
1933–1937	Sweden	11	(5)
- * Club domestic league appearances and goals

Sten Lennart Bunke (né Andersson; 3 April 1912 – 17 August 1988) was a Swedish football forward who played for Sweden. He also played for Helsingborgs IF. His brother, Torsten, was also a footballer.

== Honours ==
Club

Helsingborgs IF

- Allsvenskan: 1932–33, 1933–34

Individual

- Recipient of Stora Grabbars och Tjejers Märke: 1937
