= Svend Aage Eriksen =

Danish footballer

Personal information
- Date of birth: 12 August 1908
- Place of birth: Nykøbing Falster, Denmark
- Date of death: 23 June 1989 (aged 80)
- Position: Forward

International career
Years	Team	Apps	(Gls)
1928–1933	Denmark	5	(3)

Svend Aage Eriksen (12 August 1908 – 23 June 1989) was a Danish footballer. He played in five matches for the Denmark national football team from 1928 to 1933.
