= John Österholm (footballer) =

Finnish footballer and pilot (1896–1923)

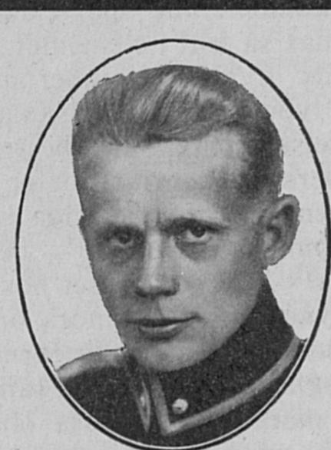

Personal information
- Date of birth: 14 June 1896
- Place of birth: Ingå, Grand Duchy of Finland
- Date of death: 19 October 1923 (aged 27)
- Place of death: Hamina, Finland
- Position: Midfielder

Senior career*
Years	Team	Apps	(Gls)
	HIFK	–	(–)

International career
1920–1922	Finland	4	(1)
- * Club domestic league appearances and goals

John Emil Österholm (14 June 1896 – 19 October 1923) was a Finnish footballer and military pilot. Österholm played for HIFK Helsinki and earned four caps for the Finland national football team. Österholm scored his only international goal against Estonia in October 1920.

In the 1918 Finnish Civil War, Österholm fought for the White Guards. He took part on the capture of the icebreaker Volynets and the Battle of Helsinki. After the war, Österholm went to a military career and became a pilot in 1923. He died in October 1923 as the Finnish Air Force IVL A.22 Hansa floatplane crashed into the Gulf of Finland outside Hamina.
