= Ragnvald Smedvik =

Norwegian footballer (1894-1975)

Personal information
- Date of birth: 8 September 1894
- Date of death: 8 January 1975 (aged 80)

International career
| Years | Team | Apps | (Gls) |
| 1914–1916 | Norway | 8 | (0) |

Ragnvald Smedvik (8 September 1894 – 8 January 1975) was a Norwegian footballer. He played in eight matches for the Norway national football team from 1914 to 1916.
