= Nuutti Lintamo =

Finnish footballer (1909–1973)

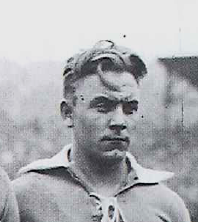

Personal information
- Date of birth: 23 December 1909
- Date of death: 25 June 1973 (aged 63)
- Position: Forward

Senior career*
Years	Team	Apps	(Gls)
1929–1944	Vaasan Palloseura		

International career
1930–1939	Finland	23	(9)
- * Club domestic league appearances and goals

Nuutti Lintamo (23 December 1909 – 25 June 1973) was a Finnish footballer who played as a forward. He made 23 appearances for the Finland national team from 1930 to 1939. He was also part of Finland's team for their qualification matches for the 1938 FIFA World Cup.

He was a one-club men and played his whole club career for Vaasan Palloseura During his 13 seasons he played 10 seasons in Mestaruussarja earning 107 caps and 82 goals for his club. In addition he played two seasons in second tier where he scored 19 goals and one season in cup formatted championship where he scored twice.

== Honours ==
Individual

- Mestaruussarja top scorer: 1935
