= Arvo Närvänen =

Finnish footballer (1905–1982)

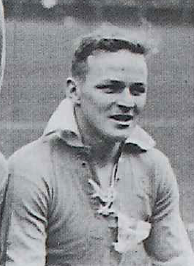
- Arvo Narvanen in 1933

Personal information
- Date of birth: 12 February 1905
- Place of birth: Vyborg, Grand Duchy of Finland, Russian Empire
- Date of death: 4 April 1982 (aged 77)
- Place of death: Helsinki, Finland
- Positions: Full back; inside forward

Senior career*
Years	Team	Apps	(Gls)
1924-1936	Viipurin Sudet	76	(23)
1937-1939	Simpeleen Urheilijat		(1)

International career
1936	Finland Olympic	1	(0)
1924–1936	Finland	41	(1)
- * Club domestic league appearances and goals

Arvo Närvänen (12 February 1905 – 4 April 1982) was a Finnish footballer. He competed in the men's tournament at the 1936 Summer Olympics. He played a bulk of his club career Viipurin Sudet. From 1931 to 1936, he played in newly formed Mestaruussarja. In his later career, he also played for Simpeleen Urheilijat in lower divisions.
