= Hjalmar Kelin =

Finnish footballer (1900–1997)

Personal information
- Date of birth: 28 September 1900
- Place of birth: Helsinki, Finland
- Date of death: 21 July 1997 (aged 96)
- Position: Forward

Senior career*
Years	Team	Apps	(Gls)
–1928	HJK Helsinki		

International career
1920–1928	Finland	42	(7)
- * Club domestic league appearances and goals

Hjalmar Kelin (28 September 1900 – 21 July 1997) was a Finnish footballer who played as a forward for HJK Helsinki. He made 42 appearances for the Finland national team from 1920 to 1928.
