= Jarl Malmgren =

Finnish footballer (1908-1942)

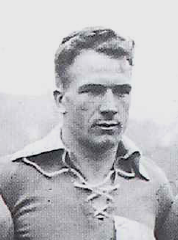
- Jarl Malmgren in 1933.

Personal information
- Date of birth: 12 September 1908
- Place of birth: Karis, Grand Duchy of Finland
- Date of death: 5 June 1942 (aged 33)
- Place of death: Pogost, Medvezhyegorsky District, Karelia, Soviet Union
- Position: Midfielder

Senior career*
Years	Team	Apps	(Gls)
1928–1937	HIFK	85	(19)
1938–1941	VIFK	–	(–)

International career
1928–1938	Finland	31	(7)
- * Club domestic league appearances and goals

Jarl Edvard Malmgren, born 12 September 1908 in Karis, Finland, died 5 June 1942 in East Karelia, Soviet Union, was a Finnish footballer who was killed in World War II.

== Playing career ==
Malmgren played 8 seasons in the Finnish premier division Mestaruussarja for IFK Helsinki and was capped 31 times by the Finland national team. He was the captain of the Finland squad at the 1936 Summer Olympics in Berlin.

== Club honours ==
- Finnish Championship: 1930, 1931, 1933, 1937
