= Pentti Larvo =

Finnish footballer (1908-1954)

Personal information
- Full name: Pentti Karl Isak Larvo
- Birth name: Pentti Karl Isak Lindsten
- Date of birth: 22 December 1908
- Place of birth: Urjala, Finland
- Date of death: 1 May 1954 (aged 45)
- Place of death: Stockholm, Sweden
- Position: Midfielder

Senior career*
Years	Team	Apps	(Gls)
1928–1939	HPS Helsinki	100	(43)
Total		100	(43)

International career
1929–1937	Finland	4	(0)
1936	Finland Olympic	1	(1)
- * Club domestic league appearances and goals

Pentti Karl Isak Larvo (né Lindsten; 12 December 1908 – 1 May 1954) was a Finnish former footballer who played as a midfielder for the Finland national football team. He also represented his nation at the 1936 Summer Olympics in Berlin.

== Career statistics ==
=== International ===
National team	Year	Apps	Goals
Finland	1929	1	0
Finland	1930	0	0
Finland	1931	0	0
Finland	1932	1	0
Finland	1933	0	0
Finland	1934	0	0
Finland	1935	1	0
Finland	1936	0	0
Finland	1937	1	0
Total		4	0
