= Verner Eklöf =

Finnish sportsman

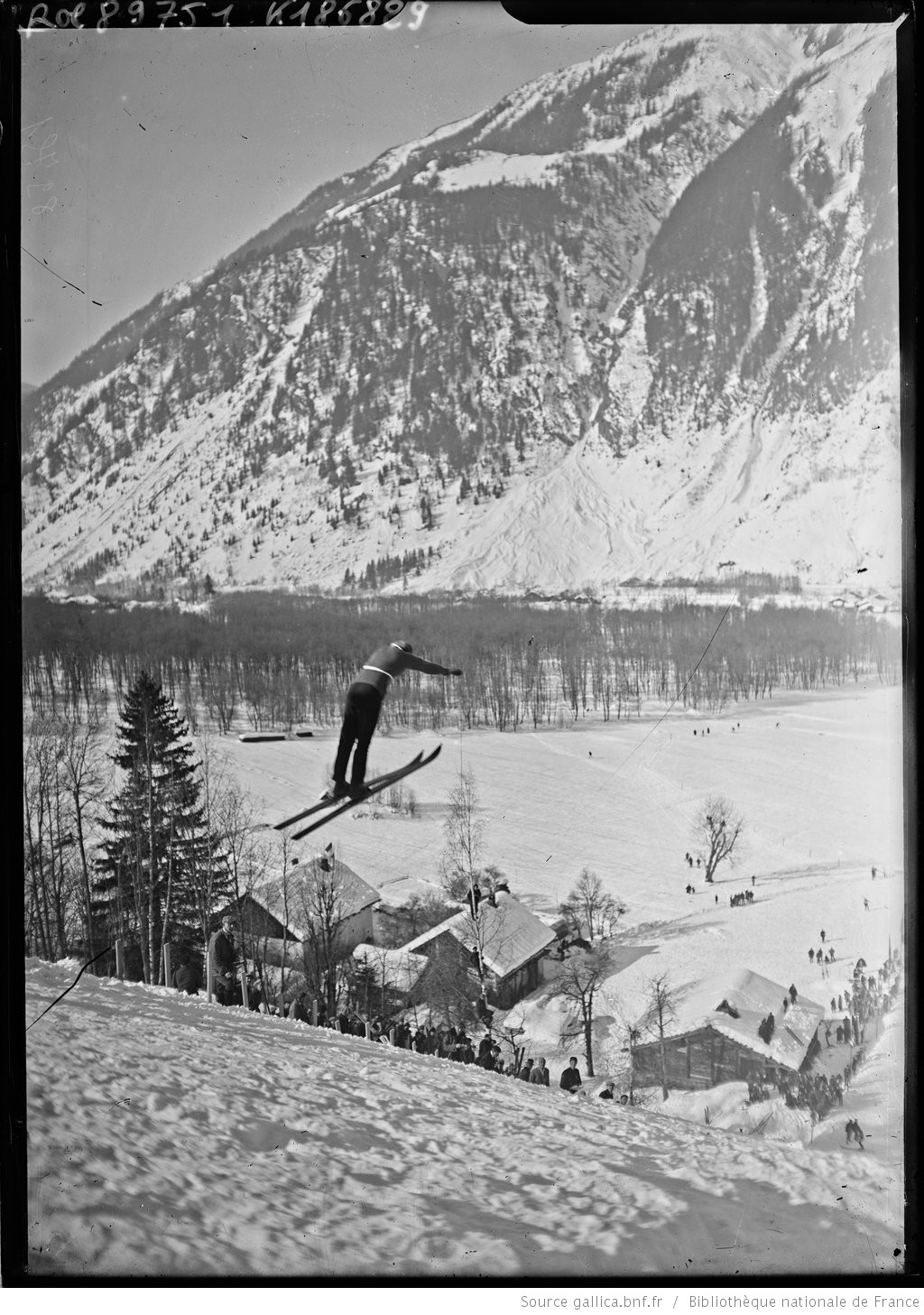

Personal information
- Full name: Verner Edmund Eklöf
- Date of birth: 8 March 1897
- Place of birth: Helsinki, Grand Duchy of Finland, Russian Empire
- Date of death: 2 December 1955 (aged 58)
- Place of death: Helsinki, Finland

Senior career*
Years	Team	Apps	(Gls)
1913–1920	HIFK	?	(?)
1920–1927	HJK	?	(?)

International career
1919–1927	Finland	32	(17)
- * Club domestic league appearances and goals

Verner Edmund Eklöf (8 March 1897 – 2 December 1955) was a Finnish sportsman active in the 1920s.

== Career ==
=== Association football ===
Eklöf played association football at international level, scoring 17 goals in 32 appearances between 1919 and 1927. Eklöf played club football for HIFK and HJK. His move from HIFK to HJK in 1920 is considered the first major transfer in Finnish football history.

=== Olympics ===
Eklöf competed in the Nordic combined event at the 1924 Winter Olympics, finishing ninth overall.
