= Ernst Grönlund =

Finnish footballer and bandy player (1902–1968)

Ernst Aleksander Grönlund (18 December 1902, in Helsinki – 13 February 1968, in Helsinki) was a Finnish footballer and bandy player.

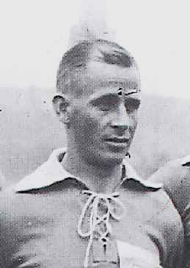
ErnstGronlund

== Football career ==
He earned 37 caps at international level between 1931 and 1940, scoring 11 goals. He also represented Finland at the 1936 Summer Olympics.

At club level Grönlund played for Töölön Vesa, HIFK, HJK, KaPS and Jyry.

== Bandy career ==
He capped 7 times at international level and won Finnish Championship 4 times.

== Honours ==
=== Football ===
- Finnish Championship: 1931, 1933, 1937
