= Töölön Pallokenttä =

Association football stadium in Helsinki, Finland

Coordinates: 60°11′9″N 24°55′29″E

- Bollis
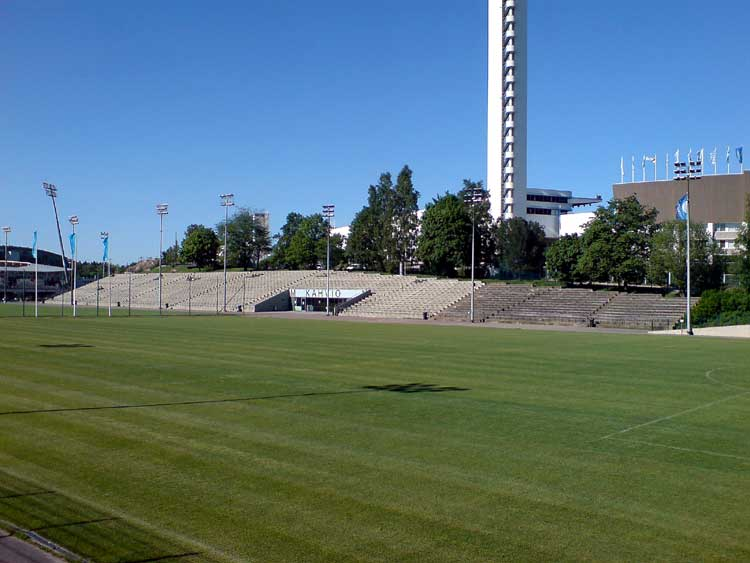
- Interactive map of Töölön Pallokenttä
- Location: Töölö, Helsinki, Finland
- Type: ballpark

Construction
- Groundbreaking: 1915
- Opened: 1915

Tenants
- HJK, Atlantis FC, FC Kiffen, HIFK Fotboll

Töölön Pallokenttä (Finnish: Töölön pallokenttä, Swedish: Tölö bollplan), also known by its nickname Bollis, is a football stadium in Helsinki, Finland. The stadium is located in the Töölö district and today it holds 4,000 spectators. Töölön Pallokenttä was originally built in 1915 and it was the first football stadium in Finland.

The stadium was last renovated in 2000–2001. It hosts matches for Atlantis FC which plays in Kakkonen and HJK Helsinki women's team in the Finnish Kansallinen Liiga.

In 1952 Summer Olympics the stadium hosted five football matches; Yugoslavia vs India, Hungary vs Italy, Sweden vs Austria, Germany vs Brazil and Yugoslavia vs Denmark.
