= Gunnar Åström =

Finnish footballer (1904–1952)

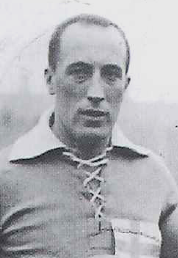
- Åström in 1933

Personal information
- Date of birth: 1904
- Place of birth: Oulu, Finland
- Date of death: 1952 (aged 47–48)
- Place of death: Finland
- Position: Forward

International career
Years	Team	Apps	(Gls)
1923–1937	Finland	43	(16)

Gunnar Åström (1904–1952) was a Finnish international footballer who earned 43 caps at international level between 1923 and 1937, scoring 16 goals.
