= William Kanerva =

Finnish footballer (1902-1956)

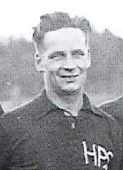
- Kanerva in HPS shirt in 1927

Personal information
- Full name: Yrjö William Kanerva
- Date of birth: 26 November 1902
- Place of birth: Impilahti, Grand Duchy of Finland
- Date of death: 10 October 1956 (aged 53)
- Place of death: Helsinki, Finland
- Position: Midfielder

Senior career*
Years	Team	Apps	(Gls)
1919–1923	HJK		
1923–1941	HPS	113	(33)

International career
1922–1938	Finland	51	(13)
- * Club domestic league appearances and goals

Yrjö William Kanerva (26 November 1902 – 10 October 1956) was a Finnish international footballer who earned 51 caps at international level between 1922 and 1938, scoring 13 goals. Kanerva played club football for HJK and HPS, and he competed at the 1936 Summer Olympics. In Mestaruussarja he played 113 matches and scored 33 times for HPS. In total he scored 55 goals for them, rest of the goals coming in cup-formatted Finnish championship tournaments. For HJK he scored 11 goals in 3 tournaments.
