= Aulis Koponen =

Finnish footballer (1906-1978)

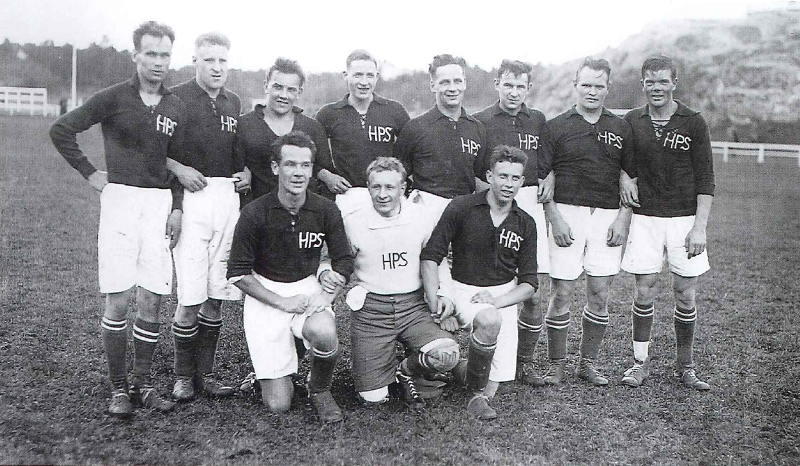
- Koponen with HPS in 1927

Personal information
- Date of birth: 5 April 1906
- Place of birth: Helsinki, Finland
- Date of death: 8 March 1978 (aged 71)
- Place of death: Finland
- Position: Forward

Senior career*
Years	Team	Apps	(Gls)
1924–1937	HPS		

International career
1924–1935	Finland	39	(16)
- * Club domestic league appearances and goals

Aulis Koponen (5 April 1906 – 8 March 1978) was a Finnish footballer who played as a forward. He earned 39 caps for the Finland national team between 1924 and 1935, scoring 16 goals. Koponen played club football with HPS.
