= 1949–50 in Swedish football =

The 1949–50 season in Swedish football, starting August 1949 and ending July 1950:

== Honours ==
=== Official titles ===
Title	Team	Reason
Swedish Champions 1949–50	Malmö FF	Winners of Allsvenskan
Swedish Cup Champions 1949	AIK	Winners of Svenska Cupen

=== Competitions ===
Level	Competition	Team
1st level	Allsvenskan 1949–50	Malmö FF
2nd level	Division 2 Nordöstra 1949–50	Örebro SK
2nd level	Division 2 Sydvästra 1949–50	Råå IF
Regional Championship	Norrländska Mästerskapet 1950	Skellefteå AIK
Cup	Svenska Cupen 1949	AIK

== Promotions, relegations and qualifications ==
=== Promotions ===
Promoted from	Promoted to	Team	Reason
Division 2 Nordöstra 1949–50	Allsvenskan 1950–51	Örebro SK	Winners
Division 2 Sydvästra 1949–50	Allsvenskan 1950–51	Råå IF	Winners
Division 3 1949–50	Division 2 Nordöstra 1950–51	Hammarby IF	Winners of Östra
Division 3 1949–50	Division 2 Nordöstra 1950–51	Sandvikens IF	Winners of Norra
Division 3 1949–50	Division 2 Sydvästra 1950–51	Lunds BK	Winners of Södra
Division 3 1949–50	Division 2 Sydvästra 1950–51	Norrby IF	Winners of Västra

=== League transfers ===
Transferred from	Transferred to	Team	Reason
Division 2 Sydvästra 1949–50	Division 2 Nordöstra 1950–51	Åtvidabergs FF	Geographical composition

=== Relegations ===
Relegated from	Relegated to	Team	Reason
Allsvenskan 1949–50	Division 2 Sydvästra 1950–51	IFK Göteborg	11th team
Allsvenskan 1949–50	Division 2 Sydvästra 1950–51	IS Halmia	12th team
Division 2 Nordöstra 1949–50	Division 3 1950–51	Sundbybergs IK	9th team
Division 2 Nordöstra 1949–50	Division 3 1950–51	Reymersholms IK	10th team
Division 2 Sydvästra 1949–50	Division 3 1950–51	Jonsereds IF	9th team
Division 2 Sydvästra 1949–50	Division 3 1950–51	IK Sleipner	10th team

== Domestic results ==
=== Allsvenskan 1949–50 ===

	Team	Pld	W	D	L	GF		GA	GD	Pts
1	Malmö FF	22	20	2	0	82	–	21	+61	42
2	Jönköpings Södra IF	22	12	3	7	50	–	37	+13	27
3	Helsingborgs IF	22	10	6	6	45	–	38	+7	26
4	AIK	22	10	6	6	34	–	31	+3	26
5	GAIS	22	7	7	8	34	–	42	-8	21
6	IFK Norrköping	22	9	2	11	36	–	45	-9	20
7	IF Elfsborg	22	6	7	9	34	–	45	-11	19
8	Djurgårdens IF	22	8	2	12	34	–	39	-5	18
9	Kalmar FF	22	5	8	9	25	–	33	-8	18
10	Degerfors IF	22	6	6	10	26	–	35	-9	18
11	IFK Göteborg	22	5	5	12	33	–	49	-16	15
12	IS Halmia	22	6	2	14	28	–	46	-18	14

=== Division 2 Nordöstra 1949–50 ===

	Team	Pld	W	D	L	GF		GA	GD	Pts
1	Örebro SK	18	11	6	1	49	–	24	+25	28
2	Surahammars IF	18	11	3	4	43	–	23	+20	25
3	IK City	18	11	2	5	47	–	32	+15	24
4	Karlstads BIK	18	9	2	7	27	–	24	+3	20
5	IF Viken	18	8	0	10	36	–	41	-5	16
6	Karlskoga IF	18	5	6	7	28	–	34	-6	16
7	IK Brage	18	6	3	9	31	–	46	-15	15
8	Sandvikens AIK	18	6	2	10	30	–	39	-9	14
9	Sundbybergs IK	18	4	3	11	29	–	42	-13	11
10	Reymersholms IK	18	3	5	10	19	–	34	-15	11

=== Division 2 Sydvästra 1949–50 ===
	Team	Pld	W	D	L	GF		GA	GD	Pts
1	Råå IF	18	14	2	2	45	–	13	+32	30
2	Halmstads BK	18	9	6	3	59	–	43	+16	24
3	Landskrona BoIS	18	8	4	6	38	–	29	+9	20
4	Örgryte IS	18	8	2	8	41	–	32	+9	18
5	Huskvarna Södra IS	18	9	0	9	35	–	39	-4	18
6	Höganäs BK	18	8	2	8	28	–	33	-5	18
7	Åtvidabergs FF	18	8	1	9	41	–	43	-2	17
8	IFK Malmö	18	7	2	9	33	–	36	-3	16
9	Jonsereds IF	18	6	1	11	34	–	50	-16	13
10	IK Sleipner	18	2	2	14	24	–	60	-36	6

=== Norrländska Mästerskapet 1950 ===
Final

June 18, 1950

Skellefteå AIK	4–0	Ljusdals IF

Gammliavallen, Umeå

=== Svenska Cupen 1949 ===
Final

July 24, 1949

AIK	1–0	Landskrona BoIS

Råsunda, Solna

== National team results ==
October 2, 1949
1948–51 Nordic Championship
№ 275

Sweden	3–3	Norway
Lindskog 60'; Jeppson 76'; Simonsson 79'		Bredesen 15', 89'; Hennum 75'

Råsunda, Solna
Attendance: 37,750
Referee: Laursen (Denmark)

October 2, 1949
1948–51 Nordic Championship
№ 276

Sweden	8–1	Finland
Jönsson 7', 9', 17'; Rydell 24', 75', 83'; Palmér 41'; Jacobsson 89'		Vaihela 4'

Malmö IP, Malmö
Attendance: 18,247
Referee: Jørkov (Denmark)

October 23, 1949
1948–51 Nordic Championship
№ 277

Denmark	3–2	Sweden
Petersen 62'; J. W. Hansen 64'; E. Hansen 85' (p)		Jeppson 28'; Mellberg 75'

Idrætsparken, Copenhagen
Attendance: 42,000
Referee: Alho (Finland)

November 13, 1949
1950 World Cup qualification
№ 278

Republic of Ireland	1–3	Sweden
Martin 61' (p)		Palmér 4', 40', 68'

Dalymount Park, Dublin
Attendance: 41,031
Referee: Ling (England)

November 20, 1949
Friendly
№ 279

Hungary	5–0	Sweden
Kocsis 8', 49', 63'; Puskás 23'; Deák 69'

Megyeri úti stadion, Budapest
Attendance: 46,000
Referee: Reader (England)

June 8, 1950
Friendly
№ 280

Sweden	4–1	Netherlands
Jeppson 21', 87'; Palmér 28'; Nilsson 57'		Clavan 31'

Råsunda, Solna
Attendance: 33,000
Referee: Ling (England)

June 25, 1950
1950 World Cup 1st group stage
№ 281

Sweden	3–2	Italy
Jeppson 25', 69'; Andersson 34'		Carapellese 7'; Muccinelli 75'

Estádio do Pacaembú, São Paulo
Attendance: 36,502
Referee: Lutz (Switzerland)

June 29, 1950
1950 World Cup 1st group stage
№ 282

Sweden	2–2	Paraguay
Sundqvist 17'; Palmér 25'		López Fretes 34'; López 74'

Estádio Durival Britto, Curitiba
Attendance: 7,903
Referee: Mitchell (Scotland)

July 9, 1950
1950 World Cup final group stage
№ 283

Brazil	7–1	Sweden
Ademir 17', 37', 51', 57'; Chico 39', 87'; Maneca 85'		Andersson 66' (p)

Estádio do Maracanã, Rio de Janeiro
Attendance: 138,886
Referee: Ellis (England)

July 13, 1950
1950 World Cup final group stage
№ 284

Uruguay	3–2	Sweden
Ghiggia 39'; Míguez 77', 84'		Palmér 4'; Sundqvist 40'

Estádio do Pacaembú, São Paulo
Attendance: 7,987
Referee: Galeati (Italy)

July 16, 1950
1950 World Cup final group stage
№ 285

Sweden	3–1	Spain
Sundqvist 15'; Mellberg 34'; Palmér 79'		Zarra 82'

Estádio do Pacaembú, São Paulo
Attendance: 11,227
Referee: Meer (Netherlands)
