= 1951–52 in Swedish football =

The 1951–52 season in Swedish football, starting August 1951 and ending July 1952:

== Honours ==
=== Official titles ===
Title	Team	Reason
Swedish Champions 1951–52	IFK Norrköping	Winners of Allsvenskan
Swedish Cup Champions 1951	Malmö FF	Winners of Svenska Cupen

=== Competitions ===
Level	Competition	Team
1st level	Allsvenskan 1951–52	IFK Norrköping
2nd level	Division 2 Nordöstra 1951–52	AIK
2nd level	Division 2 Sydvästra 1951–52	IFK Malmö
Regional Championship	Norrländska Mästerskapet 1952	Lycksele IF
Cup	Svenska Cupen 1951	Malmö FF

== Promotions, relegations and qualifications ==
=== Promotions ===
Promoted from	Promoted to	Team	Reason
Division 2 Nordöstra 1951–52	Allsvenskan 1952–53	AIK	Winners
Division 2 Sydvästra 1951–52	Allsvenskan 1952–53	IFK Malmö	Winners
Division 3 1951–52	Division 2 Nordöstra 1952–53	BK Derby	Winners of Östra
Division 3 1951–52	Division 2 Nordöstra 1952–53	Västerås SK	Winners of Norra
Division 3 1951–52	Division 2 Sydvästra 1952–53	IFK Trelleborg	Winners of Södra
Division 3 1951–52	Division 2 Sydvästra 1952–53	Örgryte IS	Winners of Västra

=== Relegations ===
Relegated from	Relegated to	Team	Reason
Allsvenskan 1951–52	Division 2 Sydvästra 1952–53	Råå IF	11th team
Allsvenskan 1951–52	Division 2 Nordöstra 1952–53	Åtvidabergs FF	12th team
Division 2 Nordöstra 1951–52	Division 3 1952–53	Sandvikens AIK	9th team
Division 2 Nordöstra 1951–52	Division 3 1952–53	Ludvika FfI	10th team
Division 2 Sydvästra 1951–52	Division 3 1952–53	Landskrona BoIS	9th team
Division 2 Sydvästra 1951–52	Division 3 1952–53	Ronneby BK	10th team

== Domestic results ==
=== Allsvenskan 1951–52 ===

	Team	Pld	W	D	L	GF		GA	GD	Pts
1	IFK Norrköping	22	15	5	2	50	–	21	+29	35
2	Malmö FF	22	15	2	5	50	–	17	+33	32
3	Helsingborgs IF	22	11	4	7	40	–	24	+16	26
4	IFK Göteborg	22	10	5	7	46	–	37	+9	25
5	GAIS	22	9	6	7	41	–	34	+7	24
6	Degerfors IF	22	9	5	8	36	–	29	+7	23
7	Djurgårdens IF	22	10	3	9	39	–	42	-3	23
8	Örebro SK	22	9	5	8	40	–	45	-5	23
9	Jönköpings Södra IF	22	7	3	12	34	–	40	-6	17
10	IF Elfsborg	22	4	6	12	27	–	47	-20	14
11	Råå IF	22	4	4	14	22	–	58	-36	12
12	Åtvidabergs FF	22	1	8	13	21	–	52	-31	10

=== Division 2 Nordöstra 1951–52 ===

	Team	Pld	W	D	L	GF		GA	GD	Pts
1	AIK	18	15	2	1	56	–	21	+35	32
2	Karlstads BIK	18	7	6	5	30	–	26	+4	20
3	Sandvikens IF	18	7	6	5	28	–	25	+3	20
4	Hammarby IF	18	6	7	5	35	–	28	+7	19
5	Motala AIF	18	7	5	6	33	–	36	-3	19
6	IF Viken	18	5	6	7	33	–	40	-7	16
7	IK City	18	6	3	9	27	–	34	-7	15
8	IK Brage	18	4	6	8	27	–	31	-4	14
9	Sandvikens AIK	18	6	2	10	34	–	45	-11	14
10	Ludvika FfI	18	4	3	11	22	–	39	-17	11

=== Division 2 Sydvästra 1951–52 ===
	Team	Pld	W	D	L	GF		GA	GD	Pts
1	IFK Malmö	18	13	2	3	43	–	22	+21	28
2	Halmstads BK	18	8	5	5	40	–	28	+12	21
3	Norrby IF	18	9	2	7	34	–	27	+7	20
4	Lunds BK	18	8	3	7	35	–	32	+3	19
5	BK Häcken	18	7	4	7	26	–	27	-1	18
6	Kalmar FF	18	7	3	8	26	–	22	+4	17
7	IS Halmia	18	7	3	8	26	–	31	-5	17
8	Höganäs BK	18	7	2	9	23	–	30	-7	16
9	Landskrona BoIS	18	5	4	9	24	–	30	-6	14
10	Ronneby BK	18	4	2	12	24	–	52	-28	10

=== Norrländska Mästerskapet 1952 ===
Final

July 6, 1952

Lycksele IF	3–0	IF Älgarna

Tannen, Lycksele

=== Svenska Cupen 1951 ===
Final

July 23, 1951

Malmö FF	2–1	Djurgårdens IF

Råsunda, Solna

== National team results ==
September 2, 1951
Friendly
№ 294

Yugoslavia	2–1	Sweden
Bobek 18'; Ognjanov 73'		Rydell 2'

Stadion JNA, Belgrade
Attendance: 55,000
Referee: Baert (Belgium)

September 2, 1951
1948–51 Nordic Championship
№ 295

Sweden	3–2	Finland
Lundkvist 33', 70'; Eriksson 88'		Vaihela 11'; Lehtovirta 29'

Råsunda, Solna
Attendance: 19,202
Referee: Narvestad (Norway)

September 30, 1951
1948–51 Nordic Championship
№ 296

Sweden	3–4	Norway
Rydell 13', 52'; Lindh 23' (p)		Boye-Karlsen 5' (p), 71' (p); Dahlen 6'; Bredesen 64'

Ullevi, Gothenburg
Attendance: 29,790
Referee: Laursen (Denmark)

October 21, 1951
1948–51 Nordic Championship
№ 297

Denmark	3–1	Sweden
Rasmussen 24'; Lundberg 34'; Staalgaard 35'		Jönsson 72'

Idrætsparken, Copenhagen
Attendance: 40,100
Referee: Pedersen (Norway)

November 11, 1951
Friendly
№ 298

Italy	1–1	Sweden
Amadei 56' (p)		Löfgren 6'

Stadio Comunale, Florence
Attendance: 85,000
Referee: Ling (England)

November 14, 1951
Friendly
№ 299

Turkey	1–0	Sweden
Tunçaltan 60'

Atatürk Stadı, Istanbul
Attendance: 25,000
Referee: Caparni (Italy)

March 26, 1952
Friendly
№ 300

France	0–1	Sweden
		Westerberg 85'

Parc des Princes, Paris
Attendance: 35,779
Referee: Bauwens (Belgium)

May 14, 1952
Friendly
№ 301

Netherlands	0–0	Sweden

Olympisch Stadion, Amsterdam
Attendance: 64,500
Referee: Orlandini (Italy)

May 30, 1952
Friendly
№ 302

Sweden	3–1	Scotland
Sandberg 2'; Löfgren 3'; Bengtsson 71'		Liddell 7'

Råsunda, Solna
Attendance: 32,122
Referee: van der Meer (Netherlands)

June 11, 1952
Jubilee tournament semi-finals
№ 303

Denmark	0–2	Sweden
		Löfgren 43'; Brodd 56'

Bislett, Oslo
Attendance: 22,058
Referee: Alho (Finland)

June 13, 1952
Jubilee tournament final
№ 304

Finland	1–1 3–1 (aet)	Sweden
Rikberg 51', 119'; Vaihela 98'		Lindh 6' (p)

Ullevaal, Oslo
Attendance: 19,766
Referee: Andersen (Norway)

June 22, 1952
1948–51 Nordic Championship
№ 305

Sweden	4–3	Denmark
Bengtsson 5'; Brodd 8'; Sandell 19', 77'		Rasmussen 57'; Petersen 60'; Seebach 78'

Råsunda, Solna
Attendance: 36,700
Referee: Pedersen (Norway)

July 21, 1952
1952 Olympics round of 16
№ 306

Sweden	4–1	Norway
Brodd 23', 35'; Rydell 81'; Bengtsson 89'		Sørensen 82'

Ratinan Stadion, Tampere
Attendance: 4,200
Referee: Alho (Finland)

July 23, 1952
1952 Olympics quarter-finals
№ 307

Sweden	3–1	Austria
Sandberg 80'; Brodd 85'; Rydell 87'		Grohs 40'

Tölö bollplan, Helsinki
Attendance: 10,000
Referee: Orlandini (Italy)

July 28, 1952
1952 Olympics semi-finals
№ 308

Hungary	6–0	Sweden
Puskás 1'; Palotás 16'; Lindh 36' (og); Kocsis 57', 62'; Hidegkuti 59'

Olympiastadion, Helsinki
Attendance: 22,000
Referee: Ling (England)

August 1, 1952
1952 Olympics 3rd place match
№ 309

Sweden	2–0	Germany
Rydell 11'; Löfgren 86'

Olympiastadion, Helsinki
Attendance: 20,000
Referee: Orlandini (Italy)
