= 1948–49 in Swedish football =

The 1948–49 season in Swedish football, starting August 1948 and ending July 1949:

== Honours ==
=== Official titles ===
Title	Team	Reason
Swedish Champions 1948–49	Malmö FF	Winners of Allsvenskan
Swedish Cup Champions 1948	Råå IF	Winners of Svenska Cupen

=== Competitions ===
Level	Competition	Team
1st level	Allsvenskan 1948–49	Malmö FF
2nd level	Division 2 Nordöstra 1948–49	Djurgårdens IF
2nd level	Division 2 Sydvästra 1948–49	Kalmar FF
Regional Championship	Norrländska Mästerskapet 1949	IFK Östersund
Cup	Svenska Cupen 1948	Råå IF

== Promotions, relegations and qualifications ==
=== Promotions ===
Promoted from	Promoted to	Team	Reason
Division 2 Nordöstra 1948–49	Allsvenskan 1949–50	Djurgårdens IF	Winners
Division 2 Sydvästra 1948–49	Allsvenskan 1949–50	Kalmar FF	Winners
Division 3 1948–49	Division 2 Nordöstra 1949–50	IK Brage	Winners of Norra
Division 3 1948–49	Division 2 Nordöstra 1949–50	IK City	Winners of Östra
Division 3 1948–49	Division 2 Nordöstra 1949–50	IF Viken	Winners of Västra
Division 3 1948–49	Division 2 Sydvästra 1949–50	Huskvarna Södra IS	Winners of Södra

=== League transfers ===
Transferred from	Transferred to	Team	Reason
Division 2 Nordöstra 1948–49	Division 2 Sydvästra 1949–50	IK Sleipner	Geographical composition
Division 2 Nordöstra 1948–49	Division 2 Sydvästra 1949–50	Åtvidabergs FF	Geographical composition
Division 2 Sydvästra 1948–49	Division 2 Nordöstra 1949–50	Karlstads BIK	Geographical composition

=== Relegations ===
Relegated from	Relegated to	Team	Reason
Allsvenskan 1948–49	Division 2 Nordöstra 1949–50	Örebro SK	11th team
Allsvenskan 1948–49	Division 2 Sydvästra 1949–50	Landskrona BoIS	12th team
Division 2 Nordöstra 1948–49	Division 3 1949–50	Sandvikens IF	9th team
Division 2 Nordöstra 1948–49	Division 3 1949–50	Ludvika FfI	10th team
Division 2 Sydvästra 1948–49	Division 3 1949–50	Tidaholms GIF	9th team
Division 2 Sydvästra 1948–49	Division 3 1949–50	Billingsfors IK	10th team

== Domestic results ==
=== Allsvenskan 1948–49 ===

	Team	Pld	W	D	L	GF		GA	GD	Pts
1	Malmö FF	22	12	5	5	72	–	29	+43	29
2	Helsingborgs IF	22	11	7	4	48	–	30	+18	29
3	GAIS	22	12	3	7	41	–	29	+12	27
4	Degerfors IF	22	10	5	7	45	–	33	+12	25
5	AIK	22	11	3	8	42	–	38	+4	25
6	IFK Göteborg	22	9	5	8	36	–	33	+3	23
7	IFK Norrköping	22	8	6	8	38	–	33	+5	22
8	Jönköpings Södra IF	22	6	10	6	34	–	52	-18	22
9	IS Halmia	22	6	7	9	33	–	39	-6	19
10	IF Elfsborg	22	7	4	11	28	–	47	-19	18
11	Örebro SK	22	5	4	13	30	–	57	-27	14
12	Landskrona BoIS	22	3	5	14	26	–	60	-34	11

=== Division 2 Nordöstra 1948–49 ===

	Team	Pld	W	D	L	GF		GA	GD	Pts
1	Djurgårdens IF	18	17	1	0	64	–	16	+48	35
2	Åtvidabergs FF	18	8	4	6	42	–	33	+9	20
3	Sundbybergs IK	18	8	3	7	47	–	37	+10	19
4	IK Sleipner	18	8	3	7	37	–	47	-10	19
5	Surahammars IF	18	6	5	7	28	–	34	-6	17
6	Sandvikens AIK	18	7	2	9	44	–	35	+9	16
7	Karlskoga IF	18	7	2	9	30	–	36	-6	16
8	Reymersholms IK	18	6	2	10	26	–	43	-17	14
9	Sandvikens IF	18	5	3	10	30	–	40	-10	13
10	Ludvika FfI	18	4	3	11	23	–	46	-23	11

=== Division 2 Sydvästra 1948–49 ===
	Team	Pld	W	D	L	GF		GA	GD	Pts
1	Kalmar FF	18	10	5	3	36	–	27	+9	25
2	IFK Malmö	18	9	4	5	42	–	35	+7	22
3	Halmstads BK	18	8	5	5	40	–	35	+5	21
4	Höganäs BK	18	7	6	5	30	–	23	+7	20
5	Råå IF	18	7	6	5	40	–	36	+4	20
6	Örgryte IS	18	8	3	7	44	–	23	+21	19
7	Jonsereds IF	18	8	2	8	44	–	34	+10	18
8	Karlstads BIK	18	6	5	7	28	–	34	-6	17
9	Tidaholms GIF	18	4	2	12	22	–	48	-26	10
10	Billingsfors IK	18	3	2	13	24	–	55	-31	8

=== Norrländska Mästerskapet 1949 ===
Final

June 19, 1949

IFK Östersund	2–1	Bodens BK

Idrottsparken, Sundsvall

=== Svenska Cupen 1948 ===
Final

July 25, 1948

Råå IF	3–2	BK Kenty

Olympia, Helsingborg

== National team results ==
August 2, 1948
1948 Olympics round of 16
№ 264

Sweden	3–0	Austria
Nordahl 1', 9'; Rosén 67'

White Hart Lane, London
Attendance: 9,514
Referee: Ling (England)

August 5, 1948
1948 Olympics quarter-finals
№ 265

Sweden	12–0	South Korea
Liedholm 11', 62'; Nordahl 25', 40', 78', 80'; Gren 27'; Carlsson 61', 64', 82'; Rosén 72', 85'

Selhurst Park, London
Attendance: 7,110
Referee: Caparni (Italy)

August 10, 1948
1948 Olympics semi-finals
№ 266

Sweden	4–2	Denmark
Carlsson 18', 44'; Rosén 30', 37'		Seebach 2'; Hansen 75'

Wembley Stadium, London
Attendance: 20,000
Referee: Boardman (England)

August 13, 1948
1948 Olympics final
№ 267

Sweden	3–1	Yugoslavia
Gren 24', 67' (p); Nordahl 48'		Bobek 42'

Wembley Stadium, London
Attendance: 40,000
Referee: Ling (England)

September 19, 1948
1948–51 Nordic Championship
№ 268

Norway	3–5	Sweden
Dahlen 14'; Thoresen 32'; Sørdal 88'		Nordahl 24', 44', 62', 74', 80'

Ullevaal, Oslo
Attendance: 36,000
Referee: Asmussen (Denmark)

September 19, 1948
1948–51 Nordic Championship
№ 269

Finland	2–2	Sweden
Lehtovirta 37'; Rytkönen 43'		Tapper 36' (p); Mårtensson 70'

Olympiastadion, Helsinki
Attendance: 15,405
Referee: Jørkov (Denmark)

October 10, 1948
1948–51 Nordic Championship
№ 270

Sweden	1–0	Denmark
Liedholm 23'

Råsunda, Solna
Attendance: 37,801
Referee: Reader (England)

November 14, 1948
Friendly
№ 271

Austria	2–1	Sweden
Wagner 37'; Habitzl 84'		Gren 88' (p)

Praterstadion, Vienna
Attendance: 60,000
Referee: Galeati (Italy)

May 13, 1949
Friendly
№ 272

Sweden	3–1	England
Carlsson 3'; Jeppson 36'; Johansson 39'		Finney 71'

Råsunda, Solna
Attendance: 37,500
Referee: Galeati (Italy)

June 2, 1949
1950 World Cup qualification
№ 273

Sweden	3–1	Republic of Ireland
Andersson 18' (p); Jeppson 38'; Liedholm 69'		Walsh 9'

Råsunda, Solna
Attendance: 38,000
Referee: Baert (Belgium)

June 19, 1949
Friendly
№ 274

Sweden	2–2	Hungary
Jeppson 80'; Gren 86'		Budai 26'; Kocsis 49'

Råsunda, Solna
Attendance: 37,781
Referee: van der Meer (Netherlands)
