= 1948 in Norwegian football =

Football in Norway
Men's football
- Norgesserien: Freidig
- NM: Sarpsborg

Results from Norwegian football in 1948.

== Norgesserien 1947–48 ==
Because of World War II, local qualifying leagues were organized in the 1946–47 season in order to determine the teams participating in Norgesserien 1947–48. No national league championship was held in 1947 though.

=== District I ===
Pos	Team	Pld	W	D	L	GF	GA	GD	Pts	Qualification or relegation
1	IL Sparta	12	9	1	2	34	14	+20	19	Qualification for the championship play-offs quarter-final
2	Fredrikstad FK	12	8	2	2	51	20	+31	18	
3	Sarpsborg FK	12	6	2	4	26	15	+11	14	
4	Lisleby FK (R)	12	5	2	5	22	23	−1	12	Qualification for the relegation play-offs
5	Selbak TIF (R)	12	5	2	5	16	23	−7	12	Relegation
6	SK Sprint (R)	12	2	1	9	13	40	−27	5	Relegation
7	SK Rapid (R)	12	1	2	9	9	36	−27	4	Relegation

Source: rsssf.no
(R) Relegated

=== District II, Group A ===
Pos	Team	Pld	W	D	L	GF	GA	GD	Pts	Qualification or relegation
1	Vålerengen	12	8	2	2	30	20	+10	18	Qualification for the championship play-offs preliminary round
2	Skeid	12	8	1	3	37	14	+23	17	
3	Birkebeineren (R)	12	4	4	4	19	21	−2	12	Qualification for the relegation play-offs preliminary round
4	Drafn (R)	12	3	4	5	24	22	+2	10	Relegation
5	Nydalen (R)	12	3	4	5	17	31	−14	10	Relegation
6	Strong (R)	12	3	3	6	16	31	−15	9	Relegation
7	Geithus (R)	12	4	0	8	22	26	−4	8	Relegation

Source: rsssf.no
(R) Relegated

=== District II, Group B ===
Pos	Team	Pld	W	D	L	GF	GA	GD	Pts	Qualification or relegation
1	Mjøndalen IF	12	11	0	1	32	7	+25	22	Qualification for the championship play-offs preliminary round
2	SFK Lyn	12	9	0	3	40	12	+28	18	
3	Sandaker SFK (O)	12	8	1	3	35	13	+22	17	Qualification for the relegation play-offs preliminary round
4	Drammens BK (R)	12	6	0	6	20	25	−5	12	Relegation
5	Frigg Oslo FK (R)	12	5	1	6	21	15	+6	11	Relegation
6	Kongsberg IF (R)	12	2	0	10	13	45	−32	4	Relegation
7	Slemmestad IF (R)	12	0	0	12	8	52	−44	0	Relegation

Source: rsssf.no
(O) Play-off winners; (R) Relegated

=== District III ===
Pos	Team	Pld	W	D	L	GF	GA	GD	Pts	Qualification or relegation
1	Kapp IL (R)	12	7	2	3	26	18	+8	16	Championship play-offs quarter-final and relegation play-offs
2	Raufoss IL (R)	12	6	1	5	32	23	+9	13	Relegation
3	SK Gjøvik-Lyn (R)	12	6	1	5	24	20	+4	13	Relegation
4	Fremad (R)	12	4	4	4	18	17	+1	12	Relegation
5	Hamar IL (R)	12	5	1	6	20	21	−1	11	Relegation
6	Hamarkameratene (R)	12	4	2	6	21	27	−6	10	Relegation
7	SK Mesna (R)	12	2	5	5	16	31	−15	9	Relegation

Source: rsssf.no
(R) Relegated

=== District IV, Group A ===
Pos	Team	Pld	W	D	L	GF	GA	GD	Pts	Qualification or relegation
1	Storms BK	12	9	2	1	27	13	+14	20	Qualification for the championship play-offs preliminary round
2	Sandefjord BK	12	7	4	1	32	14	+18	18	
3	IF Skiens Grane (R)	12	6	2	4	19	22	−3	14	Relegation
4	IF Urædd (R)	12	4	2	6	25	24	+1	10	Relegation
5	SK Snøgg (R)	12	2	6	4	17	26	−9	10	Relegation
6	IF Borg (R)	12	4	1	7	13	18	−5	9	Relegation
7	IF Fram (R)	12	0	3	9	8	24	−16	3	Relegation

Source: rsssf.no
(R) Relegated

=== District IV, Group B ===
Pos	Team	Pld	W	D	L	GF	GA	GD	Pts	Qualification or relegation
1	Ørn FK	12	8	1	3	33	21	+12	17	Qualification for the championship play-offs preliminary round
2	IF Pors	12	7	1	4	24	14	+10	15	
3	Larvik Turn & IF (R)	12	7	1	4	20	12	+8	15	Relegation
4	Odds BK (R)	12	6	2	4	20	17	+3	14	Relegation
5	Ulefoss SF (R)	12	3	4	5	19	23	−4	10	Relegation
6	Skiens BK (R)	12	2	3	7	6	24	−18	7	Relegation
7	Tønsbergs TF (R)	12	2	2	8	16	27	−11	6	Relegation

Source: rsssf.no
(R) Relegated

=== District V, Group A ===
Pos	Team	Pld	W	D	L	GF	GA	GD	Pts	Qualification or relegation
1	FK Donn (R)	10	5	4	1	15	8	+7	14	Championship play-offs preliminary round and relegation play-offs
2	IK Grane (R)	10	6	1	3	18	10	+8	13	Relegation
3	IK Start (R)	10	3	4	3	13	11	+2	10	Relegation
4	FK Vigør (R)	10	4	2	4	11	14	−3	10	Relegation
5	Flekkefjord FK (R)	10	4	1	5	18	15	+3	9	Relegation
6	FK Mandalskameratene (R)	10	1	2	7	10	27	−17	4	Relegation

Source: rsssf.no
(R) Relegated

=== District V, Group B ===
Pos	Team	Pld	W	D	L	GF	GA	GD	Pts	Qualification or relegation
1	Viking FK	12	9	1	2	29	8	+21	19	Qualification for the championship play-offs preliminary round
2	Ålgård FK (O)	12	8	0	4	21	12	+9	16	Qualification for the relegation play-offs
3	SK Jarl (R)	12	6	2	4	17	13	+4	14	Relegation
4	Stavanger IF (R)	12	5	2	5	14	18	−4	12	Relegation
5	Djerv 1919 (R)	12	4	2	6	12	22	−10	10	Relegation
6	SK Vard (R)	12	2	3	7	11	20	−9	7	Relegation
7	IL Brodd (R)	12	3	0	9	14	25	−11	6	Relegation

Source: rsssf.no
(O) Play-off winners; (R) Relegated

=== District VI ===
Pos	Team	Pld	W	D	L	GF	GA	GD	Pts	Qualification or relegation
1	SK Brann	10	9	1	0	38	5	+33	19	Qualification for the championship play-offs quarter-final
2	SK Hardy (R)	10	6	1	3	18	18	0	13	Qualification for the relegation play-offs
3	Årstad IL (R)	10	4	3	3	21	15	+6	11	Relegation
4	SK Djerv (R)	10	3	3	4	18	25	−7	9	Relegation
5	FBK Voss (R)	10	2	2	6	10	22	−12	6	Relegation
6	Nymark IL (R)	10	0	2	8	6	26	−20	2	Relegation

Source: rsssf.no
(R) Relegated

=== District VII ===
Pos	Team	Pld	W	D	L	GF	GA	GD	Pts	Qualification or relegation
1	Kristiansund FK (R)	10	8	1	1	30	6	+24	17	Championship play-offs quarter-final and relegation play-offs
2	Aalesunds FK (R)	10	5	1	4	24	14	+10	11	Relegation
3	Molde FK (R)	10	5	1	4	16	13	+3	11	Relegation
4	Clausenengen FK (R)	10	5	0	5	16	20	−4	10	Relegation
5	SPK Rollon (R)	10	4	0	6	18	25	−7	8	Relegation
6	IL Nordlandet (R)	10	1	1	8	3	29	−26	3	Relegation

Source: rsssf.no
(R) Relegated

=== District VIII ===
Pos	Team	Pld	W	D	L	GF	GA	GD	Pts	Qualification or relegation
1	SK Freidig (C)	12	6	4	2	31	14	+17	16	Qualification for the championship play-offs quarter-final
2	Ranheim IL (R)	12	6	4	2	15	10	+5	16	Qualification for the relegation play-offs
3	FK Kvik (R)	12	6	3	3	26	13	+13	15	Relegation
4	SK Falken (R)	12	3	6	3	21	21	0	12	Relegation
5	SK Brage (R)	12	4	4	4	19	20	−1	12	Relegation
6	Neset FK (R)	12	4	2	6	18	22	−4	10	Relegation
7	SK Nessegutten (R)	12	0	3	9	11	41	−30	3	Relegation

Source: rsssf.no
(C) Champions; (R) Relegated

=== Championship Preliminary Rounds ===
==== First round ====
May 25: Vålerenga-Mjøndalen 0–2

Storm-Ørn 2–1
Viking-Donn 2–1

==== Second round ====
May 29: Mjøndalen-Vålerenga 2–2 (agg. 4–2)

Donn-Viking 2–4 (agg. 3–6)

May 31: Ørn-Storm 0–2 (agg. 1–4)

=== Championship quarter-finals ===
June 6: Mjøndalen-Storm 0–0

Kapp-Sparta 2–3
Viking-Brann 2–0
Freidig-Kristiansund 4–1

June 20: Storm-Mjøndalen 0–1 (agg. 0–1)

Sparta-Kapp 4–2 (agg. 7–4)
Brann-Viking 0–3 (agg. 0–5)
Kristiansund-Freidig 4–1 (agg. 5–5)

==== Rematch ====
June 23: Freidig-Kristiansund (Freidig got a walkover)

=== Championship semi-finals ===
June 27: Sparta-Mjøndalen 2–0

Viking-Freidig 2–2 (Extra time)

==== Rematch ====
July 6: Freidig-Viking 2–1

=== Championship final ===
July 9: Freidig-Sparta 2–1

=== Play off Preliminary Round ===
May 22: Birkebeineren-Sandaker 2–1 May 29: Sandaker-Birkebeineren 2–0 (agg. 3–2)

Birkebeineren relegated

=== Play-off, Group 1 ===
June 6: Hardy-Lisleby 1–0

Ålgård-Donn 6–0

June 13: Lisleby-Donn 4–0

Ålgård-Hardy 3–0

July 4: Donn-Hardy 1–0

Lisleby-Ålgård 2–1

Pos	Team	Pld	W	D	L	GF	GA	GD	Pts	Relegation
1	Ålgård FK (O)	3	2	0	1	10	2	+8	4	
2	Lisleby FK (R)	3	2	0	1	6	2	+4	4	Relegation
3	SK Hardy (R)	3	1	0	2	3	4	−1	2	Relegation
4	FK Donn (R)	3	1	0	2	1	10	−9	2	Relegation

Source: rsssf.no
(O) Play-off winners; (R) Relegated

=== Play-off, Group 2 ===
June 6: Sandaker-Ranheim 3–1

June 13: Kapp-Kristiansund 2–3

July 4: Ranheim-Kristiansund 3–0

Sandaker-Kapp 5–1

July 11: Kristiansund-Sandaker 0–1

Ranheim-Kapp 6–2

Pos	Team	Pld	W	D	L	GF	GA	GD	Pts	Relegation
1	Sandaker SFK (O)	3	3	0	0	9	2	+7	6	
2	Ranheim IL (R)	3	2	0	1	10	5	+5	4	Relegation
3	Kristiansund FK (R)	3	1	0	2	3	6	−3	2	Relegation
4	Kapp IL (R)	3	0	0	3	5	14	−9	0	Relegation

Source: rsssf.no
(O) Play-off winners; (R) Relegated

== Norwegian Cup ==
=== Final ===
17 October 1948

Sarpsborg	1–0	Fredrikstad
Yven 25'	Report

Ullevaal Stadion, Oslo
Attendance: 35,000
Referee: Johan Narvestad (Hasle-Løren)

== Northern Norwegian Cup ==
=== Final ===
Mjølner	3–1	Narvik/Nor
	Report

== National team ==
26 May 1948 Friendly	Norway	1–2	Netherlands	Oslo, Norway
18:30 (UTC+1); Match 159	Sørensen 6'	Report	Clavan 33'; van der Tuijn 77'	Stadium: Ullevaal Stadion; Attendance: 28,800; Referee: Reg Leafe (England)

12 June 1948 1948–51 Nordic Championship	Denmark	1–2	Norway	Copenhagen, Denmark
19:00 (UTC+2); Match 160	Jensen 24'	Report	Sørdahl 37', 50'	Stadium: Københavns Idrætspark; Attendance: 41,000; Referee: Gunnar Dahlner (Sweden)

6 August 1948 Friendly	Norway	11–0	United States	Oslo, Norway
18:30 (UTC+1); Match 161	Sørdahl 1', 43'; Sørensen 3', 8', 27', 29', 47'; Thoresen 25', 57', 85'; Dahlen 84'	Report		Stadium: Bislett Stadion; Attendance: 24,362; Referee: John Erik Andersson (Sweden)

5 September 1948 1948–51 Nordic Championship	Norway	2–0	Finland	Oslo, Norway
13:15 (UTC+1); Match 162	Sørensen 2', 50'	Report		Stadium: Ullevaal Stadion; Attendance: 24,389; Referee: Ivan Eklind (Sweden)

19 September 1948 1948–51 Nordic Championship	Norway	3–5	Sweden	Oslo, Norway
13:15 (UTC+1); Match 163	Dahlen 11'; Toresen 33'; Sørdahl 84'	Report	G. Nordahl 24', 44', 62', 74', 80'	Stadium: Ullevaal Stadion; Attendance: 35,306; Referee: Axel Asmussen (Denmark)

24 December 1948 Friendly	Egypt	1–1	Norway	Cairo, Egypt
15:00 (UTC+2); Match 164	El-Sabbagh 11' (pen.)	Report	Sørensen 55'	Stadium: Nasser Stadium; Attendance: 8,000; Referee: Scott (England)
