= 1948–51 Nordic Football Championship =

Sports event

Tournament details
- Host countries: Denmark; Finland; Norway; Sweden
- Dates: 12 June 1948 – 21 October 1951
- Teams: 4

Final positions
- Champions: Sweden (3rd title)
- Runners-up: Denmark
- Third place: Norway
- Fourth place: Finland

Tournament statistics
- Matches played: 24
- Goals scored: 89 (3.71 per match)
- Top scorer: (Sweden) Egon Jönsson (7 goals)

The 1948–51 Nordic Football Championship was the fifth Nordic Football Championship staged. Four Nordic countries participated: Denmark, Finland, Norway and Sweden. Sweden won the tournament, its third Nordic Championship win. The tournament was arranged by the Danish Football Association and the trophy was named DBU's Vase.

The tournament had three occasions of a team playing two games on the same day, including two times for Sweden and one time for Denmark.

== Results ==
=== 1948 ===
12 June 1948
19:00 (+2:00)

Denmark	1-2	Norway
Jensen 24'	Report	Sørdahl 37', 50'

Idrætsparken, Copenhagen
Attendance: 41,000
Referee: Gunnar Dahlner (Sweden)
15 June 1948
19:00 (+2:00)

Finland	0-3	Denmark
	Report	J. Hansen 11' (pen.); Christiansen 56'; Lyngsaa 88'

Olympic Stadium, Helsinki
Attendance: 22,000
Referee: Ivan Eklind (Sweden)
5 September 1948
13:15 (+1:00)

Norway	2-0	Finland
Sørensen 2', 50'	Report

Ullevaal, Oslo
Attendance: 24,349
Referee: Ivan Eklind (Sweden)
19 September 1948
14:00 (UTC+2:00)

Finland	2-2	Sweden
Lehtovirta 37'; Rytkönen 43'	Report	Tapper 36' (pen.); Mårtensson 70'

Olympic Stadium, Helsinki
Attendance: 15,407
Referee: Ludvig Jørkov (Denmark)
19 September 1948
13:15 (UTC+1:00)

Norway	3-5	Sweden
Dahlen 11'; Thoresen 33'; Sørdahl 84'	Report	Nordahl 24', 44', 62', 74', 80'

Ullevaal, Oslo
Attendance: 35,306
Referee: Aksel Asmussen (Denmark)
10 October 1948
15:00 (UTC+1:00)

Sweden	1-0	Denmark
Liedholm 23'	Report

Råsunda Stadium, Stockholm
Attendance: 37,801
Referee: George Reader (England)

=== 1949 ===
8 June 1949
19:00 (UTC+2:00)

Finland	1-1	Norway
Vaihela 33'	Report	Sørensen 89'

Olympic Stadium, Helsinki
Attendance: 11,264
Referee: Aksel Asmussen (Denmark)
11 September 1949
13:15 (UTC+1:00)

Norway	0-2	Denmark
	Report	Reckendorff 28'; J. Hansen 84'

Ullevaal, Oslo
Attendance: 38,085
Referee: Karni Wolf (Finland)
11 September 1949
13:30 (UTC+1:00)

Denmark	0-2	Finland
	Report	Asikainen 14'; Rytkönen 25'

Idrætsparken, Copenhagen
Attendance: 25,700
Referee: Gunnar Dahlner (Sweden)
2 October 1949
13:30 (UTC+1:00)

Sweden	8-1	Finland
Jönsson 7', 9', 17'; Rydell 24', 75', 83'; Palmér 41'; Jacobsson 89'	Report	Vaihela 4'

Malmö IP, Malmö
Attendance: 18,247
Referee: Ludvig Jørkov (Denmark)
2 October 1949
15:00 (UTC+1:00)

Sweden	3-3	Norway
Lindskog 60'; Jeppson 76'; Simonsson 79'	Report	Bredesen 15', 89'; Hennum 75'

Råsunda Stadium, Solna
Attendance: 37,750
Referee: Valdemar Laursen (Denmark)
23 October 1949
13:00 (UTC+1:00)

Denmark	3-2	Sweden
Petersen 62'; J. Hansen 65'; E. Hansen 85' (pen.)	Report	Jeppson 27'; Mellberg 79'

Idrætsparken, Copenhagen
Attendance: 25,700
Referee: Gunnar Dahlner (Sweden)

=== 1950 ===
22 June 1950
19:00 (UTC+1:00)

Denmark	4-0	Norway
Petersen 21'; E. Hansen 38'; J. Hansen 48'; Jensen 58'	Report

Idrætsparken, Copenhagen
Attendance: 35,500
Referee: Thore Sjöberg (Sweden)
27 August 1950
15:00 (UTC+2:00)

Finland	1-2	Denmark
Asikainen 72'	Report	Petersen 20'; Seebach 73'

Olympic Stadium, Helsinki
Attendance: 20,062
Referee: Johan Narvestad (Norway)
10 September 1950

Norway	4-1	Finland
Bredesen 10'; Andersen 50', 52'; Thoresen 81'	Report	Lilja 87'

Ullevaal, Oslo
Attendance: 28,935
Referee: Ludvig Jørkov (Denmark)
24 September 1950
14:00 (UTC+2:00)

Finland	0-1	Sweden
	Report	Rosén 82'

Olympic Stadium, Helsinki
Attendance: 25,784
Referee: Aksel Asmussen (Denmark)
24 September 1950
13:15 (UTC+1:00)

Norway	1-3	Sweden
Karlsen 88' (pen.)	Report	Jönsson 53', 79'; Palmér 55'

Ullevaal, Oslo
Attendance: 35,552
Referee: Folke Nyberg (Finland)
15 October 1950
15:00 (UTC+1:00)

Sweden	4-0	Denmark
Granqvist 28'; Jönsson 29'; Bengtsson 36'; Ek 39'	Report

Råsunda Stadium, Stockholm
Attendance: 38,000
Referee: Edvin Pedersen (Norway)

=== 1951 ===
16 August 1951
18:30 (UTC+2:00)

Finland	1-1	Norway
Vaihela 41'	Report	Bredesen 64'

Olympic Stadium, Helsinki
Attendance: 22,415
Referee: John Nilsson (Sweden)
2 September 1951
15:00 (UTC+2:00)

Sweden	3-2	Finland
Lundqvist 33', 70'; Eriksson 88'	Report	Vaihela 11'; Lehtovirta 29'

Råsunda Stadium, Stockholm
Attendance: 19,202
Referee: Johan Narvestad (Norway)
16 September 1951
13:15 (UTC+1:00)

Norway	2-0	Denmark
Thoresen 26'; Jørgensen 40' (o.g.)	Report

Ullevaal, Oslo
Attendance: 35,000
Referee: John Nilsson (Sweden)
30 September 1951
13:30 (UTC+1:00)

Denmark	1-0	Finland
Staalgaard 39'	Report

Idrætsparken, Copenhagen
Attendance: 32,000
Referee: Ivan Eklind (Sweden)
30 September 1951
14:30 (UTC+1:00)

Sweden	3-4	Norway
Rydell 13', 52'; Lind 23' (pen.)	Report	Karlsen 5' (pen.), 71' (pen.); Dahlen 6'; Bredesen 64'

Ullevi Stadion, Gothenburg
Attendance: 29,790
Referee: Valdemar Laursen (Denmark)
21 October 1951
13:30 (UTC+1:00)

Denmark	3-1	Sweden
Rasmussen 25'; Lundberg 34'; Staalgaard 35'	Report	Jönsson 72'

Idrætsparken, Copenhagen
Attendance: 41,000
Referee: Edvin Pedersen (Norway)

== Table ==
The table is compiled by awarding two points for a victory, one point for a draw, and no points for a loss.

	Team	Pld	W	D	L	GF	GA	GD	Pts
1	Sweden	12	7	2	3	36	22	+14	16
2	Denmark	12	7	0	5	19	15	+4	14
3	Norway	12	5	3	4	23	24	–1	13
4	Finland	12	1	3	8	11	28	–17	5

== Winners ==
1948–51 Nordic Football Championship winners

Sweden
Third title

== Statistics ==
=== Goalscorers ===
There were 89 goals scored in 24 matches, for an average of 3.71 goals per match.

7 goals

- (Sweden) Egon Jönsson

5 goals

- (Sweden) Gunnar Nordahl
- (Sweden) Ingvar Rydell
- (Norway) Per Bredesen

4 goals

- (Finland) Jorma Vaihela

3 goals

- (Finland) Kalevi Lehtovirta
- (Norway) Jann Sørdal
- (Norway) Odd Wang Sørensen
- (Norway) Gunnar Thoresen
- (Norway) Harry Boye Karlsen

2 goals

- (Denmark) Edvin Hansen
- (Denmark) Jens Peder Hansen
- (Denmark) Hilmar Staalgaard
- (Denmark) Poul Erik Petersen
- (Finland) Yrjö Asikainen
- (Norway) Gunnar Dahlen
- (Norway) Villy Andersen
- (Sweden) Arne Lundqvist
- (Sweden) Hasse Jeppson
- (Sweden) Karl-Erik Palmér

1 goal

- (Denmark) Aage Rou Jensen
- (Denmark) Claes Petersen
- (Denmark) Frank Reckendorff
- (Denmark) Kaj Christiansen
- (Denmark) Harald Lyngsaa
- (Denmark) Holger Seebach
- (Denmark) Ivan Jensen
- (Denmark) John Hansen
- (Denmark) Jørgen Wagner Hansen
- (Denmark) Knud Lundberg
- (Denmark) Poul Åge Rasmussen
- (Finland) Aulis Rytkönen
- (Finland) Olavi Lilja
- (Norway) Harald Hennum
- (Sweden) Bror Mellberg
- (Sweden) Börje Tapper
- (Sweden) Gustaf Lind
- (Sweden) Karl Simonsson
- (Sweden) Karl-Alfred Jacobsson
- (Sweden) John Eriksson
- (Sweden) Lennart Lindskog
- (Sweden) Nils Liedholm
- (Sweden) Rune Rosén
- (Sweden) Sture Mårtensson
- (Sweden) Sylve Bengtsson
- (Sweden) Tryggve Granqvist
- (Sweden) Walfrid Ek

1 own goal

- (Denmark) Bendt Jørgensen (against Norway)

== See also ==
Balkan Cup
Baltic Cup
Central European International Cup
Mediterranean Cup

== Sources ==
- Aarhus, Lars; Elbech, Søren & Pietarinen, Heikki (1998-03-27). "Nordic Championships 1948-51". RSSSF.
- "Landsholdsdatabasen - Kampsøgning" (in Danish). DBU. Archived from the original on 2014-09-15.
