= Sweden at the FIFA World Cup =

International football delegation

This is a record of Sweden's results at the FIFA Men’s World Cup. The FIFA World Cup is an international association football competition contested by the men's national teams of the members of Fédération Internationale de Football Association (FIFA), the sport's global governing body. The championship has been awarded every four years since the first tournament in 1930, except in 1942 and 1946, due to World War II.

The tournament consists of two parts, the qualification phase and the final phase (officially called the World Cup Finals). The qualification phase, which currently take place over the three years preceding the Finals, is used to determine which teams qualify for the Finals. The current format of the Finals involves 48 teams competing for the title, at venues within the host nation (or nations) over a period of about a month. The World Cup final is the most widely viewed sporting event in the world, with an estimated 715.1 million people watching the 2006 tournament final.

Sweden have been one of the more successful national teams in the history of the World Cup, having reached the top four on four occasions, and becoming runners-up on home ground in 1958. They have been present at 13 out of 23 World Cups as of 2026.

Throughout the World Cup history, Brazil became Sweden's historical rival. The two countries have met each other seven times but Sweden never won, with five victories for the Brazilian side and two draws. Another historical opponent of Sweden in the finals is (West) Germany: four encounters, with three wins for Germany and one for Sweden.

== Overall record ==
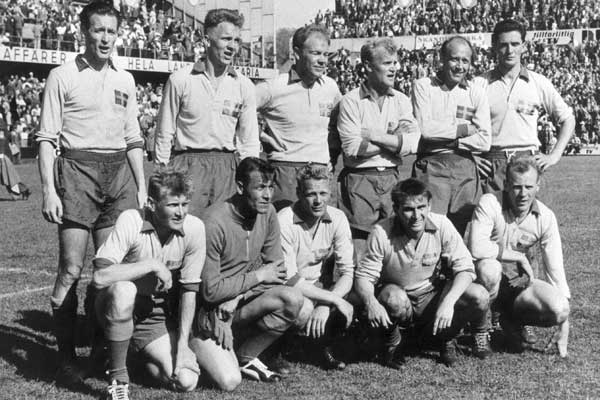
Sweden in the 1958 FIFA World Cup final

Team formations of Brazil (blue) and Sweden (yellow) at the start of the 1958 FIFA World Cup final

FIFA World Cup record									FIFA World Cup qualification record					
Year	Round	Position	Pld	W	D*	L	GF	GA	Pld	W	D	L	GF	GA
(Uruguay) 1930	Did not enter								No qualification					
(Italy) 1934	Quarter-finals	8th	2	1	0	1	4	4	2	2	0	0	8	2
(France) 1938	Fourth place	4th	3	1	0	2	11	9	3	2	0	1	11	7
(Brazil) 1950	Third place	3rd	5	2	1	2	11	15	2	2	0	0	6	2
(Switzerland) 1954	Did not qualify								4	1	1	2	9	8
(Sweden) 1958	Runners-up	2nd	6	4	1	1	12	7	Qualified as hosts					
(Chile) 1962	Did not qualify								5	3	0	2	11	5
(England) 1966	Did not qualify								4	2	1	1	10	3
(Mexico) 1970	Group stage	9th	3	1	1	1	2	2	4	3	0	1	12	5
(West Germany) 1974	Quarter-finals (Note: Last 8 held as second group stage.)	5th	6	2	2	2	7	6	7	4	2	1	17	9
(Argentina) 1978	First group stage	13th	3	0	1	2	1	3	4	3	0	1	7	4
(Spain) 1982	Did not qualify								8	3	2	3	7	8
(Mexico) 1986	Did not qualify								8	4	1	3	14	9
(Italy) 1990	Group stage	21st	3	0	0	3	3	6	6	4	2	0	9	3
(United States) 1994	Third place	3rd	7	3	3	1	15	8	10	6	3	1	19	8
(France) 1998	Did not qualify								10	7	0	3	16	9
(South Korea) (Japan) 2002	Round of 16	13th	4	1	2	1	5	5	10	8	2	0	20	3
(Germany) 2006	Round of 16	14th	4	1	2	1	3	4	10	8	0	2	30	4
(South Africa) 2010	Did not qualify								10	5	3	2	13	5
(Brazil) 2014	Did not qualify								12	6	2	4	21	18
(Russia) 2018	Quarter-finals	7th	5	3	0	2	6	4	12	7	2	3	27	9
(Qatar) 2022	Did not qualify								10	6	0	4	13	8
(Canada) (Mexico) (United States) 2026	Round of 32	27th	4	1	1	2	7	10	8	2	2	4	10	15
(Morocco) (Portugal) (Spain) 2030	To be determined								To be determined					
(Saudi Arabia) 2034	To be determined								To be determined					
Total	Best: Runners-up	13/23	55	20	14	21	87	83	149	88	23	38	290	144

*Draws include knockout matches decided via penalty shoot-out.
**Gold background color indicates that the tournament was won.
***Red border color indicates tournament was held on home soil.

Sweden's World Cup record
First match	Sweden 3–2 Argentina (27 May 1934; Bologna, Italy)
Biggest win	Sweden 8–0 Cuba (12 June 1938; Antibes, France)
Biggest defeat	Brazil 7–1 Sweden (9 July 1950; Rio de Janeiro, Brazil)
Best result	Runners-up at the 1958 FIFA World Cup
Worst result	Group stage in 1970, 1978 and 1990

== By match ==
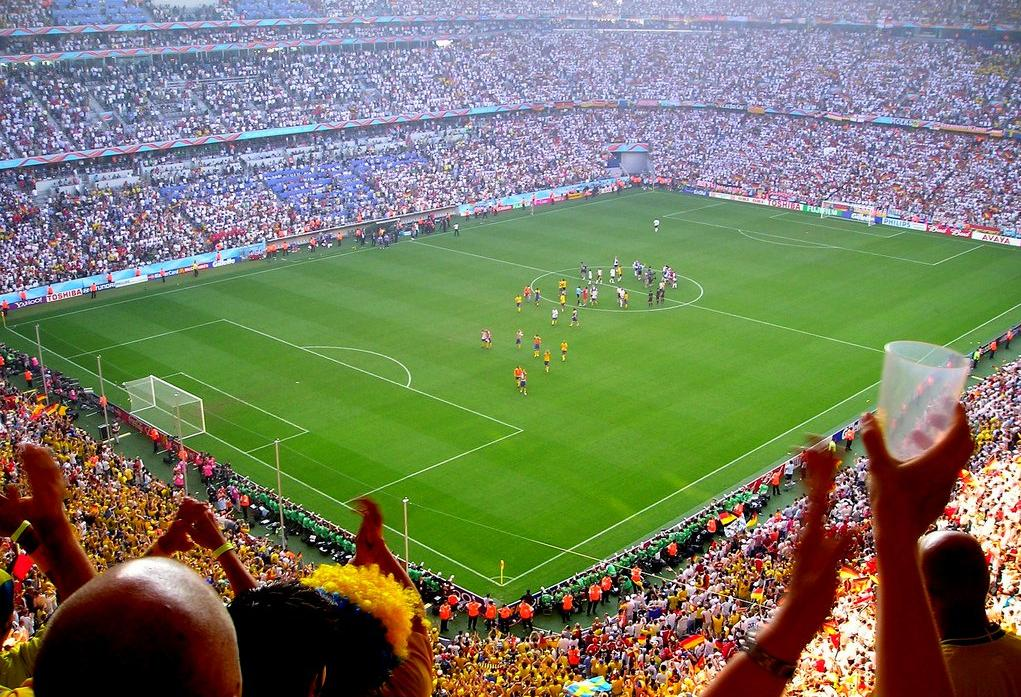
Sweden playing against Germany in the 2006 FIFA World Cup

Year	Round	Opponent	Score	Sweden scorers
(Italy) 1934	Round 1	Argentina	3–2	Jonasson (2), Kroon
(Italy) 1934	Quarter-final	Germany	1–2	Dunker
(France) 1938	Round 1	Austria	w/o	
(France) 1938	Quarter-final	Cuba	8–0	H. Andersson (3), Wetterström (3), Keller, Nyberg
(France) 1938	Semi-final	Hungary	1–5	Nyberg
(France) 1938	Match for third place	Brazil	2–4	Jonasson, Nyberg
(Brazil) 1950	Group 3	Italy	3–2	Jeppson (2), S. Andersson
(Brazil) 1950	Group 3	Paraguay	2–2	Sundqvist, Palmér
(Brazil) 1950	Final round	Brazil	1–7	S. Andersson
(Brazil) 1950	Final round	Uruguay	2–3	Palmér, Sundqvist
(Brazil) 1950	Final round	Spain	3–1	Sundqvist, B. Mellberg, Palmér
(Sweden) 1958	Group 3	Mexico	3–0	Simonsson (2), Liedholm
(Sweden) 1958	Group 3	Hungary	2–1	Hamrin (2)
(Sweden) 1958	Group 3	Wales	0–0	
(Sweden) 1958	Quarter-final	Soviet Union	2–0	Hamrin, Simonsson
(Sweden) 1958	Semi-final	West Germany	3–1	Skoglund, Gren, Hamrin
(Sweden) 1958	Final	Brazil	2–5	Liedholm, Simonsson
(Mexico) 1970	Group 2	Italy	0–1	
(Mexico) 1970	Group 2	Israel	1–1	Turesson
(Mexico) 1970	Group 2	Uruguay	1–0	Grahn
(West Germany) 1974	Group 3	Bulgaria	0–0	
(West Germany) 1974	Group 3	Netherlands	0–0	
(West Germany) 1974	Group 3	Uruguay	3–0	Edström (2), Sandberg
(West Germany) 1974	Group B	Poland	0–1	
(West Germany) 1974	Group B	West Germany	2–4	Edström, Sandberg
(West Germany) 1974	Group B	Yugoslavia	2–1	Edström, Torstensson
(Argentina) 1978	Group 3	Brazil	1–1	Sjöberg
(Argentina) 1978	Group 3	Austria	0–1	
(Argentina) 1978	Group 3	Spain	0–1	
(Italy) 1990	Group C	Brazil	1–2	Brolin
(Italy) 1990	Group C	Scotland	1–2	Strömberg
(Italy) 1990	Group C	Costa Rica	1–2	Ekström
(United States) 1994	Group B	Cameroon	2–2	Ljung, Dahlin
(United States) 1994	Group B	Russia	3–1	Dahlin (2), Brolin
(United States) 1994	Group B	Brazil	1–1	K. Andersson
(United States) 1994	Round of 16	Saudi Arabia	3–1	Dahlin, K. Andersson (2)
(United States) 1994	Quarter-final	Romania	2–2 (5-4 p)	Brolin, K. Andersson
(United States) 1994	Semi-final	Brazil	0–1	
(United States) 1994	Match for third place	Bulgaria	4–0	Brolin, Mild, Larsson, K. Andersson
(South Korea) (Japan) 2002	Group F	England	1–1	Alexandersson
(South Korea) (Japan) 2002	Group F	Nigeria	2–1	Larsson (2)
(South Korea) (Japan) 2002	Group F	Argentina	1–1	Svensson
(South Korea) (Japan) 2002	Round of 16	Senegal	1–2 (g.g.)	Larsson
(Germany) 2006	Group B	Trinidad and Tobago	0–0	
(Germany) 2006	Group B	Paraguay	1–0	Ljungberg
(Germany) 2006	Group B	England	2–2	Allbäck, Larsson
(Germany) 2006	Round of 16	Germany	0–2	
(Russia) 2018	Group F	South Korea	1–0	Granqvist
(Russia) 2018	Group F	Germany	1–2	Toivonen
(Russia) 2018	Group F	Mexico	3–0	Augustinsson, Granqvist, Álvarez (o.g.)
(Russia) 2018	Round of 16	Switzerland	1–0	Forsberg
(Russia) 2018	Quarter-final	England	0–2	
(United States) (Canada) (Mexico) 2026	Group F	Tunisia	5–1	Ayari (2), Isak, Gyökeres, Svanberg
(United States) (Canada) (Mexico) 2026	Group F	Netherlands	1–5	Elanga
(United States) (Canada) (Mexico) 2026	Group F	Japan	1–1	Elanga
(United States) (Canada) (Mexico) 2026	Round of 32	France	0–3	

== Player records ==
=== Most appearances ===
Rank	Player	Matches	World Cups
1	Henrik Larsson	13	1994, 2002 and 2006
2	Kalle Svensson	11	1950 and 1958
2	Bo Larsson	11	1970, 1974 and 1978
4	Ronnie Hellström	10	1970, 1974 and 1978
4	Björn Nordqvist	10	1970, 1974 and 1978
4	Tomas Brolin	10	1990 and 1994
4	Klas Ingesson	10	1990 and 1994
4	Roland Nilsson	10	1990 and 1994
4	Thomas Ravelli	10	1990 and 1994
10	Lennart Skoglund	9	1950 and 1958
10	Ralf Edström	9	1974 and 1978
10	Stefan Schwarz	9	1990 and 1994

=== Top goalscorers ===
With his five goals in 1994, Kennet Andersson won the shared Bronze Boot at that tournament.

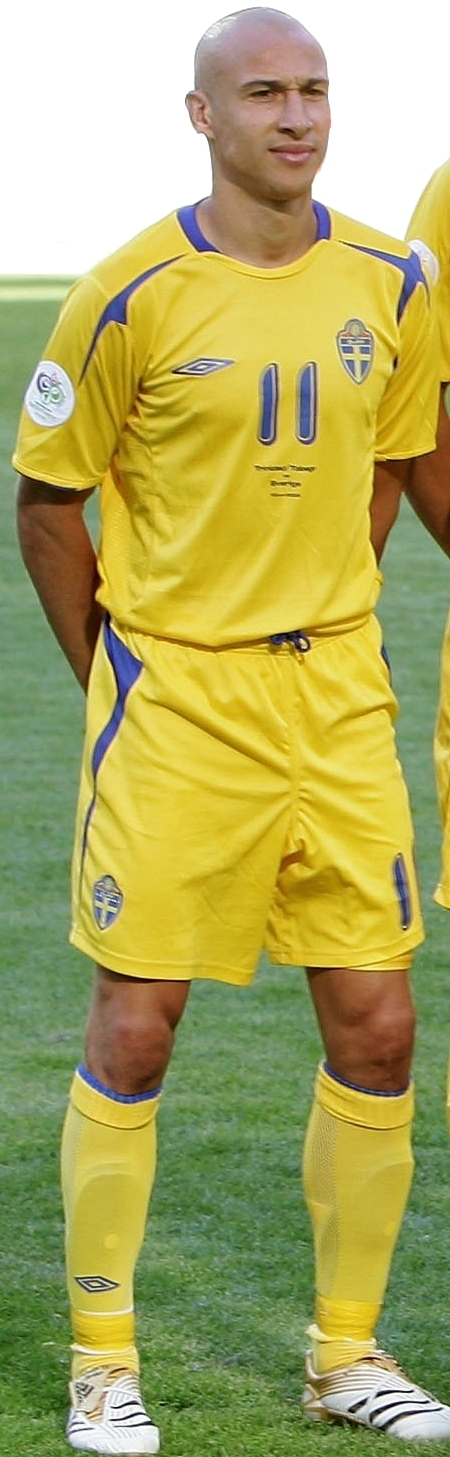
Henrik Larsson, Sweden's joint all-time top scorer (alongside Kennet Andersson) at the World Cup

Rank	Player	Goals	World Cups
1	Kennet Andersson	5	1994
1	Henrik Larsson	5	1994 (1), 2002 (3) and 2006 (1)
3	Agne Simonsson	4	1958
3	Kurt Hamrin	4	1958
3	Ralf Edström	4	1974
3	Tomas Brolin	4	1990 (1) and 1994 (3)
3	Martin Dahlin	4	1994
8	Sven Jonasson	3	1934 (2) and 1938 (1)
8	Harry Andersson	3	1938
8	Gustav Wetterström	3	1938
8	Arne Nyberg	3	1938
8	Karl-Erik Palmér	3	1950
8	Stig Sundqvist	3	1950

== See also ==
- Sweden at the UEFA European Championship
