= Vaihela =

Vaihela is a surname. Notable people with the surname include:

- Jorma Vaihela (1925–2006), Finnish footballer
- Seppo Vaihela (born 1953), Swedish bandy and football player
