= Tannen =

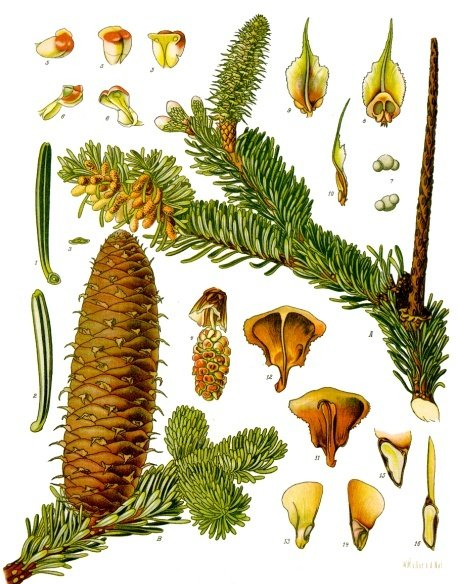

Origin
- Language: German
- Meaning: fir
- Region of origin: Germany

Other names
- Variant forms: Tanne, Tannenbaum, Jedlík, Jedlička, Jedliček Related place names: Jedlicze

Tannen is surname of:

- Biff Tannen, a character in the Back to the Future trilogy
- Val Tannen (born 1953), Professor of Computer Science at the University of Pennsylvania
- Charles Tannen (1915–1980), American actor
- Deborah Tannen (born 1945), American academic and professor of linguistics
- Julius Tannen (1880–1965), comedian and father of Charles and William Tannen
- Karl Tannen (1827–1904), German publisher and writer
- Steve Tannen (born 1968), American singer-songwriter
- Steven Olson Tannen (born 1948), American college and professional football player
- William Tannen

== See also ==
- Lake Tannen
