= Karl-Erik Palmér =

Swedish footballer (1929–2015)

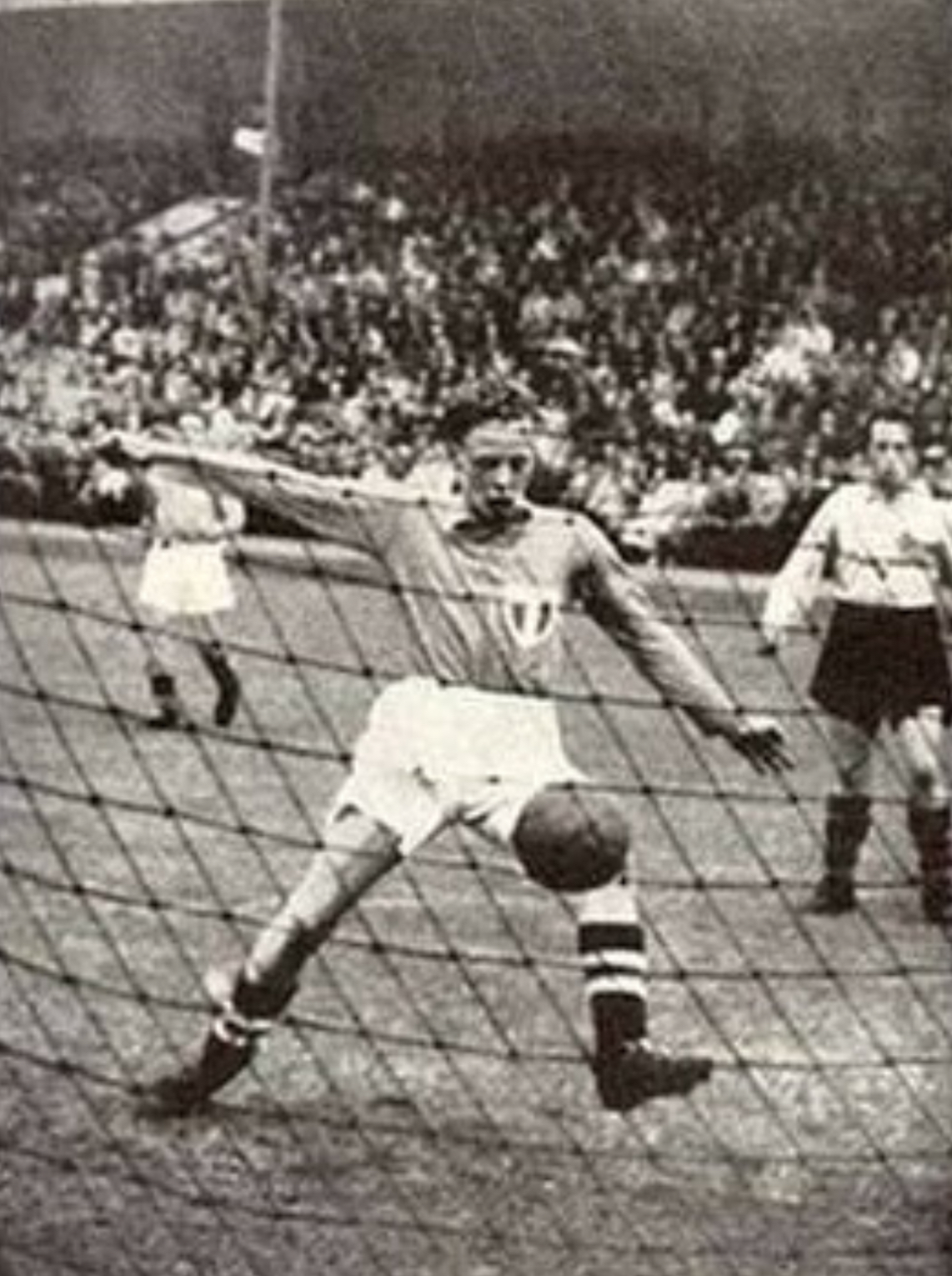

Personal information
- Date of birth: 17 April 1929
- Place of birth: Malmö, Sweden
- Date of death: 2 February 2015 (aged 85)
- Height: 1.68 m (5 ft 6 in)
- Position: Midfielder

Senior career*
| Years | Team | Apps | (Gls) |
| 1948–1951 | Malmö FF | 49 | (22) |
| 1951–1958 | Legnano | 192 | (21) |
| 1958–1959 | Juventus | 3 | (0) |
| 1960 | Malmö FF | 3 | (0) |
| Total | | 247 | (43) |

International career
| 1949–1950 | Sweden | 14 | (10) |
Medal record
Representing Sweden
FIFA World Cup
| Third place | 1950 Brazil |
- * Club domestic league appearances and goals

Karl-Erik "Calle" Palmér (17 April 1929 – 2 February 2015) was a Swedish professional football player who played as a midfielder. He spent the majority of his club career in Italy, and earned 14 caps for Sweden, scoring 10 goals.

== Career ==
Palmér represented Malmö FF, Legnano, and Juventus during a club career that spanned between 1948 and 1960. He belonged to the legendary Malmö FF lineup, which won three straight championships in the 1948-49, 1949-50 and 1950-51 seasons and played 49 Allsvenskan matches in a row without a loss. After his first match playing for MFF, the daily newspaper Sydsvenskan reported on his playing style. "Perfect balls to his winger varied with calm back passes to the half-backs when the moment called for it. Time and again, his passes, which testified to his exquisite vision, drew ovation-like applause."

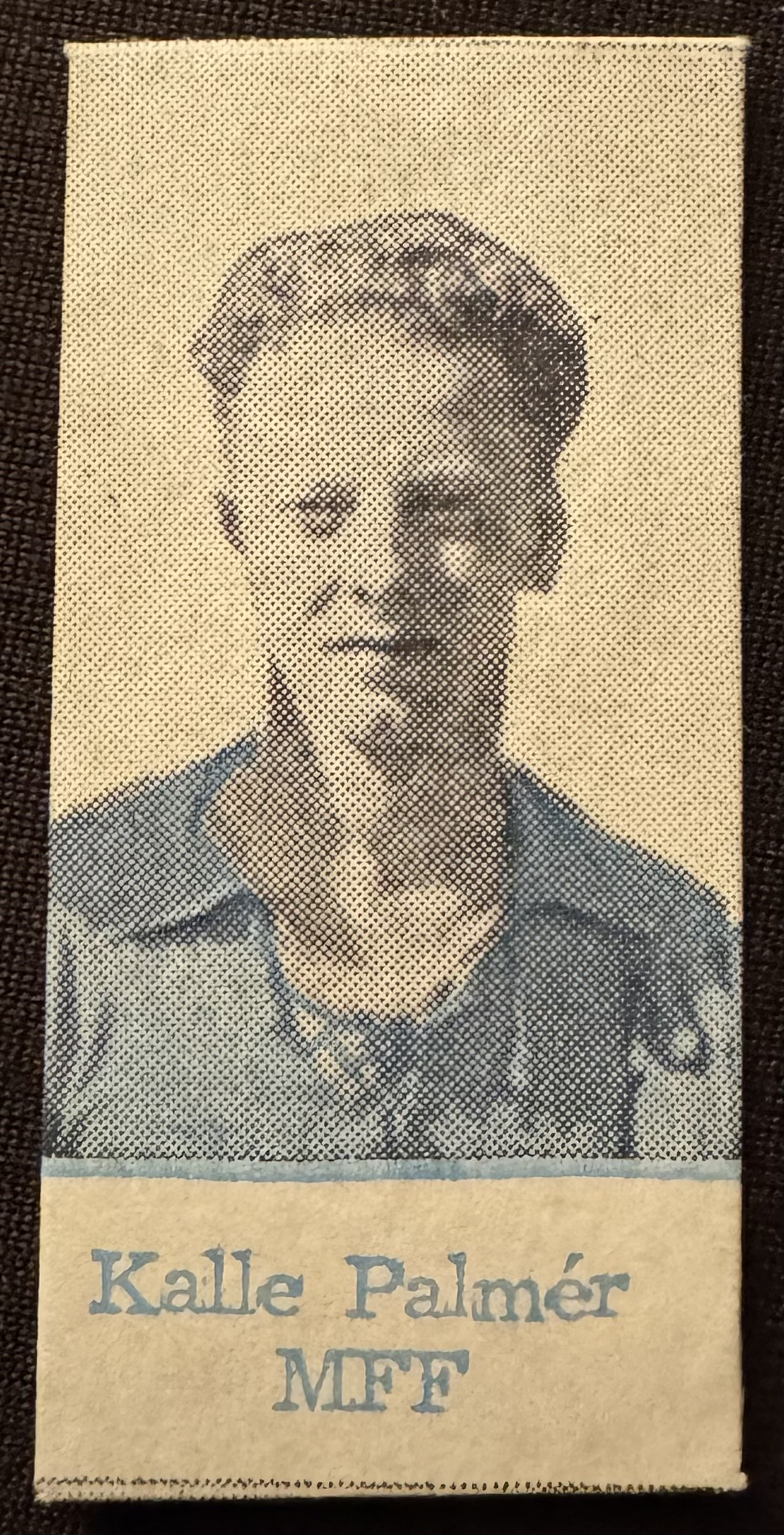
Calle Palmér

A full international between 1949 and 1952, he won 14 caps and scored ten goals for the Sweden national team. In the World Cup qualifying match against Ireland in Dublin in 1949, Sweden won 3–1, with Palmér scoring all three goals. He scored three goals in five games at the 1950 FIFA World Cup as Sweden finished third. The successful World Cup winger trio Palmér-Jeppson-Skoglund was referred to in the press as Pal-Jep-Sko, a tribute that referred to the golden winger trio Gre-No-Li from the London Olympics and whose members, like this one, all ended up being recruited as professionals for Italy.

== Personal life ==
After finishing his football career, Palmér was employed as a sports journalist, first at Arbetet and then at Sydsvenskan, where he worked until his retirement in 1994. Palmér was the father of former professional footballer Anders Palmér who also represented the Sweden national team and won the Swedish Championship with Malmö FF.

== Career statistics ==
=== International ===
Appearances and goals by national team and year
| National team | Year | Apps | Goals |
|---|---|---|---|
| Sweden | 1949 | 4 | 4 |
| Sweden | 1950 | 10 | 6 |
| Total | | 14 | 10 |

Scores and results list Sweden's goal tally first, score column indicates score after each Palmér goal.

List of international goals scored by Karl-Erik Palmér
| No. | Date | Venue | Opponent | Score | Result | Competition | Ref. |
|---|---|---|---|---|---|---|---|
| 1 | 2 October 1949 | Malmö IP, Malmö, Sweden | Finland | 5–1 | 8–1 | 1948–51 Nordic Football Championship | |
| 2 | 13 November 1949 | Dalymount Park, Dublin, Ireland | Republic of Ireland | 1–0 | 3–1 | 1950 FIFA World Cup qualifier | |
| 3 | 13 November 1949 | Dalymount Park, Dublin, Ireland | Republic of Ireland | 2–0 | 3–1 | 1950 FIFA World Cup qualifier | |
| 4 | 13 November 1949 | Dalymount Park, Dublin, Ireland | Republic of Ireland | 3–1 | 3–1 | 1950 FIFA World Cup qualifier | |
| 5 | 8 June 1950 | Råsunda Stadium, Solna, Sweden | Netherlands | 2–0 | 4–1 | Friendly | |
| 6 | 29 June 1950 | Estadio Durival de Brito, Paraná, Brazil | Paraguay | 2–0 | 2–2 | 1950 FIFA World Cup | |
| 7 | 13 July 1950 | Pacaembu Stadium, São Paulo, Brazil | Uruguay | 1–0 | 2–3 | 1950 FIFA World Cup | |
| 8 | 16 July 1950 | Pacaembu Stadium, São Paulo, Brazil | Spain | 3–0 | 3–1 | 1950 FIFA World Cup | |
| 9 | 24 September 1950 | Ullevaal Stadium, Oslo, Norway | Norway | 2–0 | 3–1 | 1948–51 Nordic Football Championship | |
| 10 | 12 November 1950 | Stade des Charmilles, Geneva, Switzerland | Switzerland | 1–2 | 2–4 | Friendly | |

== Honours ==
Malmö FF

- Allsvenskan: 1948–49, 1949–50, 1950–51

Juventus

- Coppa Italia: 1958–59

Sweden

- FIFA World Cup third place: 1950

Individual

- Stor Grabb: 1950
