= 1949–50 Allsvenskan =

26th season of Allsvenskan

Allsvenskan
- Season: 1949–50
- Champions: Malmö FF
- Relegated: IFK Göteborg; IS Halmia
- Top goalscorer: Ingvar Rydell, Malmö FF (22)
- Average attendance: 12,527

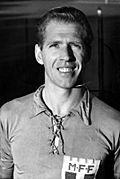
Erik Nilsson (Malmö FF) - 1950 Guldbollen winner

Statistics of Allsvenskan in season 1949/1950.

== Overview ==
The league was contested by 12 teams, with Malmö FF winning the championship unbeaten.

== League table ==
Pos	Team	Pld	W	D	L	GF	GA	GD	Pts	Qualification or relegation
1	Malmö FF (C)	22	20	2	0	82	21	+61	42	
2	Jönköpings Södra IF	22	12	3	7	50	37	+13	27	
3	Hälsingborgs IF	22	10	6	6	45	38	+7	26	
4	AIK	22	10	6	6	34	31	+3	26	
5	GAIS	22	7	7	8	34	42	−8	21	
6	IFK Norrköping	22	9	2	11	36	45	−9	20	
7	IF Elfsborg	22	6	7	9	34	45	−11	19	
8	Djurgårdens IF	22	8	2	12	34	39	−5	18	
9	Kalmar FF	22	5	8	9	25	33	−8	18	
10	Degerfors IF	22	6	6	10	26	35	−9	18	
11	IFK Göteborg (R)	22	5	5	12	33	49	−16	15	Relegation to Division 2
12	IS Halmia (R)	22	6	2	14	28	46	−18	14	Relegation to Division 2

Rules for classification: 1) points; 2) goal difference; 3) number of goals scored.
(C) Champions; (R) Relegated

== Results ==
Home \ Away	AIK	DEG	DJU	GAIS	HIF	IFE	IFKG	IFKN	ISH	JS	KFF	MFF
AIK		2–0	2–1	3–0	2–1	1–4	2–1	2–1	3–1	2–3	2–3	3–3
Degerfors IF	0–0		2–1	1–0	1–3	3–5	3–1	4–0	1–2	1–1	2–0	1–5
Djurgårdens IF	1–1	2–1		6–2	1–2	2–3	2–0	0–3	3–0	2–0	2–0	0–3
GAIS	0–1	1–1	3–1		1–2	5–1	0–0	0–5	2–1	2–2	1–1	1–4
Hälsingborgs IF	1–1	2–0	4–4	1–2		6–1	3–1	3–0	3–1	1–2	3–1	2–2
IF Elfsborg	0–0	0–1	3–1	1–1	2–2		1–1	2–4	1–0	0–3	1–1	0–2
IFK Göteborg	4–0	2–0	1–2	1–2	1–1	2–2		2–3	2–0	2–1	1–1	2–9
IFK Norrköping	3–1	1–1	2–0	1–1	0–3	2–4	2–3		0–2	3–1	2–1	0–2
IS Halmia	0–2	2–0	2–1	2–4	2–1	1–1	2–3	4–2		1–4	0–0	1–3
Jönköpings Södra	0–2	2–2	2–1	0–3	7–0	3–1	4–1	1–2	4–3		4–1	1–4
Kalmar FF	1–1	0–0	0–1	2–2	1–1	3–1	1–0	3–0	3–1	0–1		1–2
Malmö FF	3–1	3–1	3–0	5–1	5–0	1–0	6–3	5–0	3–0	4–2	5–1	

Legend: Blue = home team win; Yellow = draw; Red = away team win.

== Attendances ==
No.	Club	Average	Highest
1	AIK	21,755	38,258
2	Djurgårdens IF	21,262	39,023
3	Malmö FF	17,290	19,575
4	IFK Göteborg	17,188	28,320
5	GAIS	14,300	26,618
6	Hälsingborgs IF	11,311	24,314
7	Kalmar FF	9,240	15,243
8	Jönköpings Södra IF	9,089	18,522
9	IFK Norrköping	9,020	17,499
10	IF Elfsborg	8,866	13,586
11	IS Halmia	6,501	8,986
12	Degerfors IF	4,991	13,286
