= Jedlička =

Jedlička (feminine: Jedličková) is a Czech surname, meaning 'small fir'. Notable people with the surname include:

- Gotthard Jedlicka (1899–1965), Swiss art historian and writer
- Jiří Jedlička (born 1987), Czech swimmer
- Josef Jedlička (1927–1990), Czech writer
- Maria Jeritza, born Marie Jedličková (1887–1982), Czech opera singer
- Martin Jedlička (born 1998), Czech footballer
- Michal Jedlička (born 1973), Czech orienteering competitor
- Niki Jedlicka (born 1987), Austrian poker player
- Vít Jedlička (born 1983), Czech politician and activist

== See also ==
- Jedlička Institute
