= 1948 Norwegian Football Cup =

Norgesmesterskapet i fotball for menn 1948

Tournament details
- Country: Norway
- Teams: 112 (main competition)

Final positions
- Champions: Sarpsborg (4th title)
- Runners-up: Fredrikstad

The 1948 Norwegian Football Cup was the 43rd season of the Norwegian annual knockout football tournament. The tournament was open for all members of NFF, except those from Northern Norway. The final was played at Marienlyst Stadion in Drammen on 16 October 1932, and was a replay of the 1935 final with five-time former winners Fredrikstad, and three-time former winners Sarpsborg. Unlike the 1935-final, the final was won Sarpsborg, with a 1–0 margin, which secured their fourth title. Skeid were the defending champions, but were eliminated by Kvik (Trondheim) in the fourth round.

The eight district champions in the 1947–48 League of Norway (Sparta, Mjøndalen, Viking, Freidig, Storm, Kapp, Brann and Kristiansund) got a walkover in the first round, and the four semi-finalists in the playoffs (Sparta, Mjøndalen, Viking and Freidig) got a walkover in the second round.

== First round ==
Team 1	Score	Team 2
Clausenengen	3–2	Braatt
Djerv	2–1	Djerv 1919
Donn	1–0	Brevik
Drafn	6–0	Bjørkelangen
Drammens BK	2–0	Tønsberg-Kameratene
Egersund	0–1	Start
Falken	4–1	Nidar
Flekkefjord	8–0	Mandalskameratene
Fremad Lillehammer	2–1	Raumnes & Årnes
Frigg	5–0	Mesna
Geithus	1–1 (a.e.t.)	Kjelsås
Grane (Arendal)	1–0	Skiens BK
HamKam	1–6	Fredrikstad
Hardy	2–1 (a.e.t.)	Brodd
Herkules	2–0	Fram (Larvik)
Jarl	4–5	Nymark
Jevnaker	3–2	Birkebeineren
Kongsberg	3–1	Borg
Kvik (Trondheim)	2–0 (Note: Rematch after protest.)	Nessegutten
Larvik Turn	2–0	Vigør
Lisleby	3–3 (a.e.t.)	Lillestrøm
Magnor	1–7	Sandaker
Nordlandet	1–0	Molde
Nordnes	1–2	Årstad
Nydalen	1–1 (a.e.t.)	Rakkestad
Nærbø	0–2	Ålgård
Pors	4–0	Rjukan
Raufoss	2–1	Vikersund
Rena	0–2	Hamar
Rollon	4–3	Hødd
Rosenborg	1–0	Brage
Sandefjord BK	4–1	Sagene
Sarpsborg	7–1	Asker
Selbak	5–0	B.14
Skeid	6–0	Ottestad
Skiens Grane	2–2 (a.e.t.)	Rapid
Slemmestad	1–4	Odd
Snøgg	1–2	Stag
Sprint-Jeløy	3–3 (a.e.t.)	Solberg
Stavanger	3–0	Sauda
Steinkjer	7–4	Løkken
Strong	2–0	Gjøvik-Lyn
Sverre	0–2	Neset
Torp	0–2	Lyn
Tønsberg Turn	1–1 (a.e.t.)	Moss
Ulefoss	0–1	Urædd
Vard	1–1 (a.e.t.)	Varegg
Vardal	1–0	Vålerengen
Veblungsnes	0–1 (a.e.t.)	Aalesund
Verdal	0–6	Ranheim
Voss	1–0 (a.e.t.)	Trane
Ørn	3–0	Mysen
Replay
Kjelsås	2–1	Geithus
Lillestrøm	2–1 (a.e.t.)	Lisleby
Moss	1–2	Tønsberg Turn
Nessegutten	0–3	Kvik (Trondheim)
Rakkestad	3–0	Nydalen
Rapid	1–3	Skiens Grane
Solberg	3–1	Sprint-Jeløy
Varegg	0–1	Vard

== Second round ==
Team 1	Score	Team 2
Clausenengen	4–1	Rollon
Fredrikstad	7–0	Strong
Hamar	0–1	Sarpsborg
Hardy	2–3	Vard
Kjelsås	0–1	Frigg
Kristiansund	?–?	Nordlandet
Kvik (Trondheim)	7–1	Falken
Lillestrøm	1–2	Sandefjord BK
Lyn	7–0	Raufoss
Neset	1–1 (a.e.t.)	Steinkjer
Nymark	0–3	Brann
Odd	6–2	Donn
Rakkestad	1–0	Drafn
Ranheim	5–0	Rosenborg
Sandaker	1–0	Selbak
Skiens Grane	0–0 (a.e.t.)	Kongsberg
Solberg	0–0 (a.e.t.)	Larvik Turn
Stag	0–1	Jevnaker
Start	1–2	Pors
Stavanger	2–1	Flekkefjord
Storm	2–1	Grane (Arendal)
Tønsberg Turn	0–1 (a.e.t.)	Herkules
Urædd	0–5	Skeid
Vardal	1–4	Drammens BK
Ørn	5–1	Kapp
Aalesund	2–1	Fremad Lillehammer
Ålgård	1–2	Djerv
Årstad	4–1	Voss
Replay
Kongsberg	?–?	Skiens Grane
Larvik Turn	0–2	Solberg
Steinkjer	1–4	Neset

== Third round ==
Team 1	Score	Team 2
15 August 1948
Sarpsborg	2–1	Solberg
Skeid	4–2 (a.e.t.)	Aalesund
Frigg	0–1	Storm
Drammens BK	1–2 (a.e.t.)	Lyn
Mjøndalen	2–1	Rakkestad
Ørn	3–1 (a.e.t.)	Jevnaker
Sandefjord BK	2–3	Odd
Pors	3–1	Sandaker
Herkules	1–3	Fredrikstad
Skiens Grane	2–3	Sparta
Viking	3–1	Årstad
Brann	1–1 (a.e.t.)	Vard
Djerv	1–1 (a.e.t.)	Stavanger
Kristiansund	0–2	Kvik (Trondheim)
Freidig	3–0	Neset
Ranheim	3–1	Clausenengen
Replay: 18 August 1948
Vard	0–2	Brann
Stavanger	5–1	Djerv

== Fourth round ==
Team 1	Score	Team 2
29 August 1948
Sparta	2–1	Pors
Fredrikstad	4–0	Ørn
Lyn	1–2	Ranheim
Mjøndalen	2–2 (a.e.t.)	Brann
Storm	0–3	Viking
Odd	1–3 (a.e.t.)	Freidig
Stavanger	0–3	Sarpsborg
Kvik (Trondheim)	5–1	Skeid
Replay: 5 September 1948
Brann	1–4	Mjøndalen

== Quarter-finals ==
Team 1	Score	Team 2
26 September 1948
Fredrikstad	2–1	Sparta
Sarpsborg	2–1	Ranheim
Freidig	1–0	Kvik (Trondheim)
Mjøndalen	0–1	Viking

== Semi-finals ==
Team 1	Score	Team 2
3 October 1948
Sarpsborg	3–1	Viking
Fredrikstad	3–1	Freidig

== Final ==
17 October 1948

Sarpsborg	1–0	Fredrikstad
Yven 25'	Report

Ullevaal Stadion, Oslo
Attendance: 35,000
Referee: Johan Narvestad (Hasle-Løren)

== See also ==
- 1947–48 League of Norway
- 1948 in Norwegian football
