= Tanne =

Tanne (German for "fir tree") or Tann may refer to:

- Tann, Hesse, a city in Hesse
- Tann, Bavaria, a town in the district of Rottal-Inn in Bavaria
- Tann, Switzerland, a village of the municipality of Dürnten in the canton of Zurich
- Tanne, Saxony-Anhalt, a town in the district of Harz in Saxony-Anhalt

== People with the surname ==
- Adam Tann (born 1982), English association football player
- Bert Tann (1914–1972), English association football player and manager
- Georgia Tann (1891–1950), American adoption worker
- Hilary Tann (1947–2023), Welsh composer
- John Laurence Tann (1890–19??), English rower
- Malcolm Tann (born 1978), American heavyweight boxer
- Wesley Tann (1928–2012), American fashion designer
- Willie Tann, English poker player
- Richard Tanne (born 1985), American film director, writer, actor and producer
- Tanne, a nickname of Danish writer Karen Blixen (1885–1962)

== See also ==
- Von der Tann (disambiguation)
- Tannenbaum (disambiguation), a German synonym for Tanne
