= Villy Andersen =

Norwegian footballer (1925-2013)

Willy Andersen
Personal information
- Date of birth: 25 January 1925
- Date of death: 11 February 2013 (aged 88)
- Place of death: Sarpsborg, Norway
- Position: Forward

Senior career*
Years	Team	Apps	(Gls)
- Sarpsborg FK

International career
1949–1950	Norway	6	(4)
- * Club domestic league appearances and goals

Willy Andersen, alternatively spelled Willy Andresen (29 January 1925 – 11 February 2013) was a Norwegian footballer.

== Club career ==
He played for Sarpsborg FK the most of his career. He also had a short career spell abroad, in Stade Français Paris.

== International career ==
He was capped six times for Norway from 1949 to 1950, scoring four goals. He made his debut on 18 May 1949 in a Friendly against England and scored Norway's only goal in a 4-1 defeat.

== International goals ==
Norway score listed first, score column indicates score after each Andersen goal.

International goals by date, venue, cap, opponent, score, result and competition
No.	Date	Venue	Opponent	Score	Result	Competition
1	18 May 1949	Ullevaal Stadion, Oslo, Norway	England	1–2	1–4	Friendly
2	10 September 1950	Ullevaal Stadion, Oslo, Norway	Finland	2–0	4–1	1948–51 Nordic Football Championship
3	10 September 1950	Ullevaal Stadion, Oslo, Norway	Finland	3–0	4–1	1948–51 Nordic Football Championship
4	26 November 1950	Dalymount Park, Dublin, Ireland	Republic of Ireland	2–0	2–2	Friendly
