= Egon Jönsson =

Swedish footballer

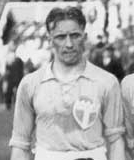
- Jönsson with Malmö FF in 1949

Personal information
- Full name: Bengt Ingvar Egon Jönsson
- Date of birth: October 8, 1921
- Place of birth: Malmö, Sweden
- Date of death: March 19, 2000 (aged 78)
- Place of death: Malmö, Sweden
- Position: Right midfielder

Senior career*
Years	Team	Apps	(Gls)
1943–1954	Malmö FF	200	(99)

International career
1947	Sweden B	2	(0)
1946–1952	Sweden	22	(9)
Medal record
Representing Sweden
Olympic Games
Gold medal – first place	1948 London
Bronze medal – third place	1952 Helsinki
FIFA World Cup
Bronze medal – third place	1950 Brazil
- * Club domestic league appearances and goals

Bengt Ingvar Egon "Todde" Jönsson (8 October 1921 – 19 March 2000) was a Swedish footballer who played as a midfielder for Malmö FF and the Sweden national team. A full international between 1946 and 1952, he earned 22 caps for Sweden, scoring nine goals. He was a member of the Sweden team that won the Olympic gold medal at the 1948 Summer Olympics in London, and he also helped win bronze medals at the 1952 Summer Olympics and the 1950 FIFA World Cup.

== Club career ==
Nicknamed "Todde den Hemlige," Jönsson played 405 matches for Malmö FF, winning four Allsvenskan titles. He played in 200 Allsvenskan games for Malmö and scored 99 goals. Jönsson featured in every match of Malmö FF’s historic 49-match unbeaten streak, which lasted from 1949 to 1951.

== International career ==
Jönsson was part of the Sweden squads that competed at the 1948 and 1952 Summer Olympics, winning one gold medal and one bronze medal He was also part of the Sweden team that finished third at the 1950 FIFA World Cup. He won a total of 22 caps between 1946 and 1952, scoring 9 goals.

== Coaching career ==
After his active career, Jönsson was a youth coach and part of the coaching staff for Malmö FF during the European Cup final against Nottingham Forest in 1979.

== Career statistics ==
=== International ===
Appearances and goals by national team and year
National team	Year	Apps	Goals
Sweden	1946	1	2
Sweden	1947	0	0
Sweden	1948	2	0
Sweden	1949	4	3
Sweden	1950	7	3
Sweden	1951	7	1
Sweden	1952	1	0
Total		22	9

Scores and results list Sweden's goal tally first, score column indicates score after each Jönsson goal.

List of international goals scored by Egon Jönsson
No.	Date	Venue	Opponent	Score	Result	Competition	Ref.
1	15 August 1946	Helsinki Olympic Stadium, Helsinki, Finland	Finland	2–0	7–0	Friendly	
2	15 August 1946	Helsinki Olympic Stadium, Helsinki, Finland	Finland	7–0	7–0	Friendly	
3	2 October 1949	Malmö IP, Malmö, Sweden	Finland	1–1	8–1	1948–51 Nordic Football Championship	
4	2 October 1949	Malmö IP, Malmö, Sweden	Finland	2–1	8–1	1948–51 Nordic Football Championship	
5	2 October 1949	Malmö IP, Malmö, Sweden	Finland	3–1	8–1	1948–51 Nordic Football Championship	
6	24 September 1950	Ullevaal Stadion, Oslo, Norway	Norway	1–0	3–1	1948–51 Nordic Football Championship	
7	24 September 1950	Ullevaal Stadion, Oslo, Norway	Norway	3–0	3–1	1948–51 Nordic Football Championship	
8	15 October 1950	Råsunda Stadium, Solna, Sweden	Denmark	2–0	4–0	1948–51 Nordic Football Championship	
9	21 October 1951	Malmö Stadion, Malmö, Sweden	Denmark	1–3	1–3	1948–51 Nordic Football Championship	

== Honours ==
Malmö FF

- Allsvenskan: 1943–44, 1948–49, 1949–50, 1950–51

Sweden

- FIFA World Cup third place: 1950
- Summer Olympics: 1948
- Summer Olympics third place: 1952
- Nordic Football Championship: 1948–1951

Individual

- Nordic Football Championship top scorer: 1948–1951
