= Harald Lyngsaa =

Danish footballer (1917-1982)

Personal information
- Full name: Harald Christian Lyngsaa
- Date of birth: 22 October 1917
- Place of birth: Copenhagen, Denmark
- Date of death: 9 October 1982 (aged 64)
- Position: Midfielder

Senior career*
Years	Team	Apps	(Gls)
1936–1941	Kjøbenhavns Boldklub		
1936–1941	B.93		
1936–1941	Kjøbenhavns Boldklub		

International career
1945–1946	Denmark U21	2	(1)
1940–1950	Denmark	14	(2)
- * Club domestic league appearances and goals

Harald Christian Lyngsaa (22 October 1917 – 9 December 1982) was a Danish footballer who played as a midfielder for Kjøbenhavns Boldklub and B.93. He made 14 appearances for the Denmark national team from 1940 to 1950.
