= Von der Tann =

Von der Tann may refer to:

- SMS Von der Tann, an Imperial German Navy battlecruiser which served in World War I; launched in 1909
- Von der Tann (gunboat), the first propeller-driven gunboat in the world; launched in 1849
- Hartmann von der Tann (born 1943), German journalist
- Ludwig Freiherr von und zu der Tann-Rathsamhausen (1815–1881), Bavarian general who fought in several wars, and from whom SMS Von der Tann took its name
