= Niki Jedlicka =

Austrian poker player (born 1987)

- Nicknames: KaiBuxxe; RealAndyBeal
- Born: 19 August 1987 (age 39)

European Poker Tour
- Title: None
- Final tables: 5
- Money finishes: 5

Nikolaus Jedlicka (born 19 August 1987) is an Austrian professional poker player who specializes in online Pot Limit Omaha cash games.

== Poker ==
Jedlicka began as a competitive Magic: The Gathering player before transitioning to online poker. In 2007, Jedlicka won $3.5 million within five months on Full Tilt Poker, playing under the alias KaiBuxxe. After his win Jedlicka described everything as a permanent freeroll. After being signed by Full Tilt, Jedlicka played under his real name where he proceeded to lose $4.4 million. Jedlicka also plays on PokerStars under the alias RealAndyBeal where he suffered an additional loss of over $500,000.

Jedlicka briefly returned to online poker in April 2014 where he won $1.6 million in a few weeks. In July 2016, Jedlicka returned again and won $216,000.

As of 2020, Jedlicka's live tournament winnings exceed $990,000.
