= 1948–49 Allsvenskan =

25th season of Allsvenskan

Allsvenskan
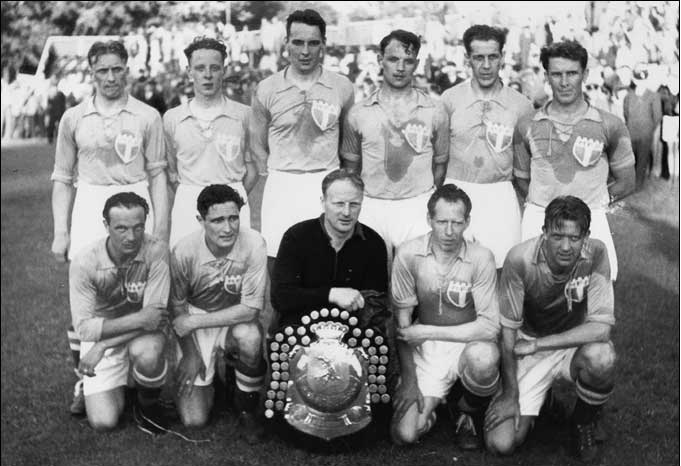
- The Malmö FF team that won Allsvenskan in 1948–1949
- Season: 1948–49
- Champions: Malmö FF
- Relegated: Örebro SK; Landskrona BoIS
- Top goalscorer: Carl-Johan Franck, Hälsingborgs IF (19)
- Average attendance: 10,668

Statistics of Allsvenskan in season 1948/1949.

== Overview ==
The league was contested by 12 teams, with Malmö FF winning the championship.

== League table ==
Pos	Team	Pld	W	D	L	GF	GA	GD	Pts	Qualification or relegation
1	Malmö FF (C)	22	12	5	5	72	29	+43	29	
2	Hälsingborgs IF	22	11	7	4	48	30	+18	29	
3	GAIS	22	12	3	7	41	29	+12	27	
4	Degerfors IF	22	10	5	7	45	33	+12	25	
5	AIK	22	11	3	8	42	38	+4	25	
6	IFK Göteborg	22	9	5	8	36	33	+3	23	
7	IFK Norrköping	22	8	6	8	38	33	+5	22	
8	Jönköpings Södra IF	22	6	10	6	34	52	−18	22	
9	IS Halmia	22	6	7	9	33	39	−6	19	
10	IF Elfsborg	22	7	4	11	28	47	−19	18	
11	Örebro SK (R)	22	5	4	13	30	57	−27	14	Relegation to Division 2
12	Landskrona BoIS (R)	22	3	5	14	26	60	−34	11	Relegation to Division 2

Rules for classification: 1) points; 2) goal difference; 3) number of goals scored.
(C) Champions; (R) Relegated

== Results ==
Home \ Away	AIK	DIF	GAIS	HIF	IFE	IFKG	IFKN	ISH	JS	BOIS	MFF	ÖSK
AIK		4–2	0–2	3–2	2–1	0–3	0–3	3–1	5–1	0–1	3–0	2–0
Degerfors IF	0–1		1–0	3–3	5–0	4–1	2–1	4–2	1–1	4–0	2–1	3–1
GAIS	1–1	1–0		4–0	1–2	0–0	2–0	1–0	2–0	6–0	1–5	4–1
Hälsingborgs IF	1–1	1–0	5–1		3–0	2–0	1–3	2–1	5–0	1–1	1–1	5–3
IF Elfsborg	4–2	3–2	1–5	0–3		0–1	1–4	0–0	4–4	0–0	2–1	1–2
IFK Göteborg	3–2	1–3	1–2	0–0	0–1		0–1	1–0	2–2	5–2	4–4	4–1
IFK Norrköping	1–4	1–1	5–0	0–2	2–1	4–2		2–3	0–0	4–0	2–2	0–1
IS Halmia	2–2	1–1	0–0	2–2	0–2	2–2	1–1		3–2	4–2	5–1	1–0
Jönköpings Södra	3–2	2–2	2–1	3–1	2–0	0–2	1–1	3–2		2–1	2–2	1–1
Landskrona BoIS	2–3	5–1	2–4	1–4	2–2	0–1	3–1	0–2	1–1		0–6	1–2
Malmö FF	5–0	2–0	0–1	2–2	4–0	3–1	4–0	6–0	12–0	5–0		4–2
Örebro SK	0–2	1–4	3–2	1–2	2–3	0–2	2–2	2–1	2–2	2–2	1–2	

Legend: Blue = home team win; Yellow = draw; Red = away team win.

== Attendances ==
#	Club	Average	Highest
1	AIK	19,636	31,576
2	Malmö FF	16,308	18,793
3	IFK Göteborg	16,277	20,635
4	GAIS	14,131	28,266
5	Hälsingborgs IF	11,363	17,014
6	IFK Norrköping	9,881	15,388
7	Jönköpings Södra IF	8,586	11,258
8	IF Elfsborg	8,006	11,145
9	Örebro SK	7,802	12,228
10	IS Halmia	6,307	9,708
11	Degerfors IF	4,960	8,157
12	Landskrona BoIS	4,913	7,519
