= Jann Sørdahl =

Norwegian footballer (1920-1996)

Personal information
- Full name: Jann Oddvar Sørdal
- Date of birth: 17 October 1920
- Place of birth: Strinda, Norway
- Date of death: 18 September 1996 (aged 75)
- Place of death: Trondheim, Norway
- Position: Forward

Senior career*
Years	Team	Apps	(Gls)
- Freidig

International career
1947	Norway B	1	(0)
1948	Norway	5	(5)
- * Club domestic league appearances and goals

Jann Oddvar Sørdal (17 October 1920 – 18 September 1996) was a Norwegian footballer who played for Freidig. He was capped five times for the Norway national football team in 1948, scoring five goals.

== Career statistics ==
=== International ===
Appearances and goals by national team and year
National team	Year	Apps	Goals
Norway	1948	5	5
Total		5	5

=== International goals ===
Scores and results list Norway's goal tally first.

No	Date	Venue	Opponent	Score	Result	Competition
1.	12 June 1948	Københavns Idrætspark, Copenhagen, Denmark	Denmark	1–1	2–1	1948–51 Nordic Football Championship
2.	12 June 1948	Københavns Idrætspark, Copenhagen, Denmark	Denmark	2–1	2–1	1948–51 Nordic Football Championship
3.	6 August 1948	Bislett Stadium, Oslo, Norway	United States	1–0	11–0	Friendly
4.	6 August 1948	Bislett Stadium, Oslo, Norway	United States	7–0	11–0	Friendly
5.	19 September 1948	Ullevaal Stadion, Oslo, Norway	Sweden	3–5	3–5	1948–51 Nordic Football Championship
