= Walfrid Ek =

Swedish footballer

Personal information
- Full name: Walfrid Ek
- Position: Forward

Senior career*
Years	Team	Apps	(Gls)
1946–1953	Malmö FF	84	(39)
- * Club domestic league appearances and goals

Walfrid Ek was a Swedish footballer who played as a forward.
