= Bendt Jørgensen =

Danish footballer (1924-2000)

Personal information
- Full name: Bendt Holger Jørgensen
- Date of birth: 24 May 1924
- Place of birth: Copenhagen, Denmark
- Date of death: 31 January 2000 (aged 75)
- Position: Midfielder

Senior career*
| Years | Team | Apps | (Gls) |
| 1943–1947 | Hvidovre IF | | |
| 1947–1956 | Frem | | |

International career
| 1950–1951 | Denmark | 2 | (0) |

Managerial career
- 1960: B.93
- 1961: Husum BK
- 1962–1965: Hvidovre IF
- 1966–1970: Vejle
- 1970–1971: Silkeborg IF
- * Club domestic league appearances and goals

Bendt Holger Jørgensen (24 May 1924 – 31 January 2000) was a Danish football player and manager who played as a midfielder. He made two appearances for the Denmark national team from 1950 to 1951.
