= Seppo Vaihela =

Personal information
- Date of birth: 1953 (age 71–72)
- Place of birth: Pori, Finland

Senior career*
Years	Team	Apps^{†}	(Gls)^{†}
- IFK Kungälv
- Ale-Surte

National team
- Sweden
- * Senior club appearances and goals counted for the domestic league only. † Appearances (Goals).

Seppo Vaihela (born 1953 in Pori, Finland) is a Swedish bandy and association football executive and previously bandy and football player.

Vaihela played bandy in the clubs IFK Kungälv and Ale-Surte BK and was also part of the Sweden national bandy team. He also played football in the lower divisions. After his player's career, he was president for IFK Kungälv and then he was president for Swedish Bandy Association in 2002-2006 and for a while also vice president for the Federation of International Bandy. Later, he returned to football to take up the presidency for football club IFK Göteborg.

Vaihela moved from Finland to Sweden at the age of 2. He is the son of Jorma Vaihela, who played in the Finland national football team.
