= Mick Clavan =

Dutch footballer

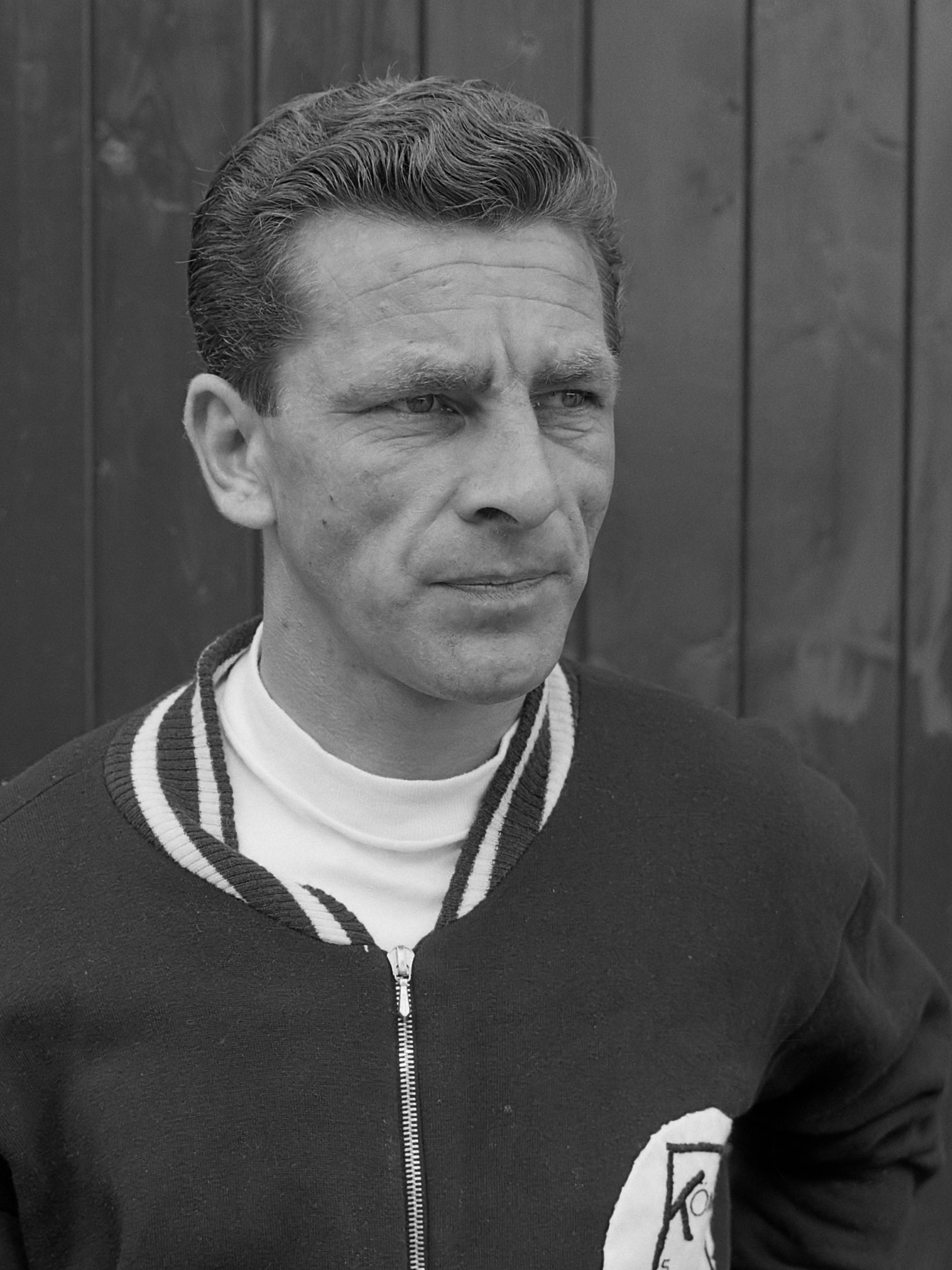
- Clavan in 1964

Personal information
- Full name: Matthijs Clavan
- Date of birth: 11 March 1929
- Place of birth: The Hague, Netherlands
- Date of death: 11 July 1983 (aged 54)
- Place of death: The Hague, Netherlands
- Positions: Left winger; inside left

Youth career
- RVC Rijswijk

Senior career*
Years	Team	Apps	(Gls)
1943–1954	ADO		
1954–1956	SHS		
1956–1963	ADO	213	(39)
1963–1966	Holland Sport	85	(9)

International career
1948–1965	Netherlands	27	(7)
- * Club domestic league appearances and goals

Matthijs "Mick" Clavan (11 March 1929 – 11 July 1983) was a Dutch footballer. He enjoyed a long career on both club and international level, currently having the third longest international career in the history of the national team with nearly seventeen years. He played on the left side of the pitch, mainly as a left winger and inside left, but later in his career also as left midfielder and left back.

== Club career ==
Born in The Hague, Matthijs Clavan started his club career with RVC Rijswijk before moving to ADO. At the age of 15, he acquired the nickname Mick, as his speed and cunning playing style drew comparisons with Mickey Mouse. Aside from his footballing skills, Clavan also showed a capricious character, such as when in 1951, while on military service, he insulted a sergeant and was convicted to two months in jail.

In 1954, professionalism was introduced to Dutch football, which prompted Clavan to move to the newly formed "paid club" SHS. Here, he formed a successful partnership with fellow left-sided forward Bertus de Harder. In 1956, he returned to ADO, which also had begun to pay its players. During the 1956–57 season, he helped ADO to achieve promotion to the Eredivisie. He also helped them reach the final of the KNVB Cup in 1959. In 1962, he returned to SHS (later renamed Holland Sport), which was by then playing in the second division. He retired at the age of 37.

== International career ==
On 26 May 1948, aged 19, Clavan made his debut for the Dutch national side, scoring once in a 2–1 away win against Norway. He was subsequently selected for the Dutch squad at that year's Summer Olympics, but did not make an appearance. By the end of 1950, he had gained 12 caps, but due to his fickle character, Clavan's international appearances became more scattered after that. He was selected for the 1952 Summer Olympics, where he played in the Netherlands' only match, a 1–5 defeat against Brazil.

On 3 April 1957, Clavan gained his 24th cap in a 1–2 home defeat against West Germany. He would subsequently not be called up for more than five and a half years, until November 1962, when Elek Schwartz recalled Clavan, by now 33 years old and playing for a second-tier club, for a European Championship qualifier against Switzerland. He helped the team win the home match 3–1. Almost two years later, in October 1964, Clavan was recalled again, this time for a World Championship qualifier against Albania. With him, the Netherlands won this away match 2–0. Clavan gained his final cap on 26 January 1965, aged 35, as a substitute for Klaas Nuninga in a 1–0 away win against Israel. In total, he earned 27 caps, in which he scored 7 goals.

Clavan's international career lasted 16 years and 245 days, which makes him currently the footballer with the fourth longest Oranje career, after Abe Lenstra (19 years and 19 days), Bertus de Harder (16 years and 363 days) and Maarten Stekelenburg (16 years and 9 months).

== Later life and death ==
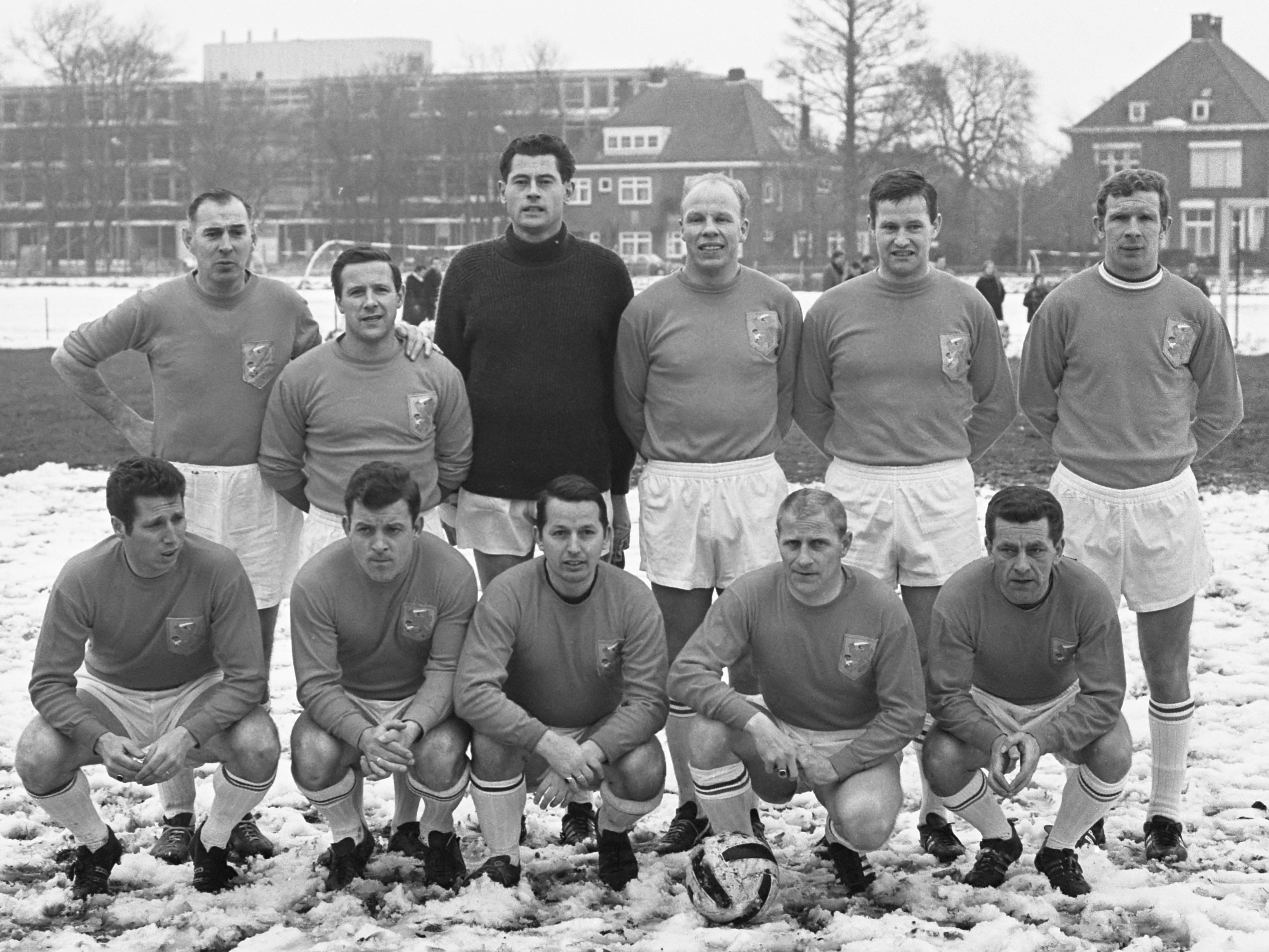
Clavan (below, right) with other former Dutch internationals in 1969

After retiring, Clavan managed amateur team Ooievaars.On 11 July 1983, he died as a result of a heart attack. He was 54 years old.
