= Bror Mellberg =

Swedish footballer (1923–2004)

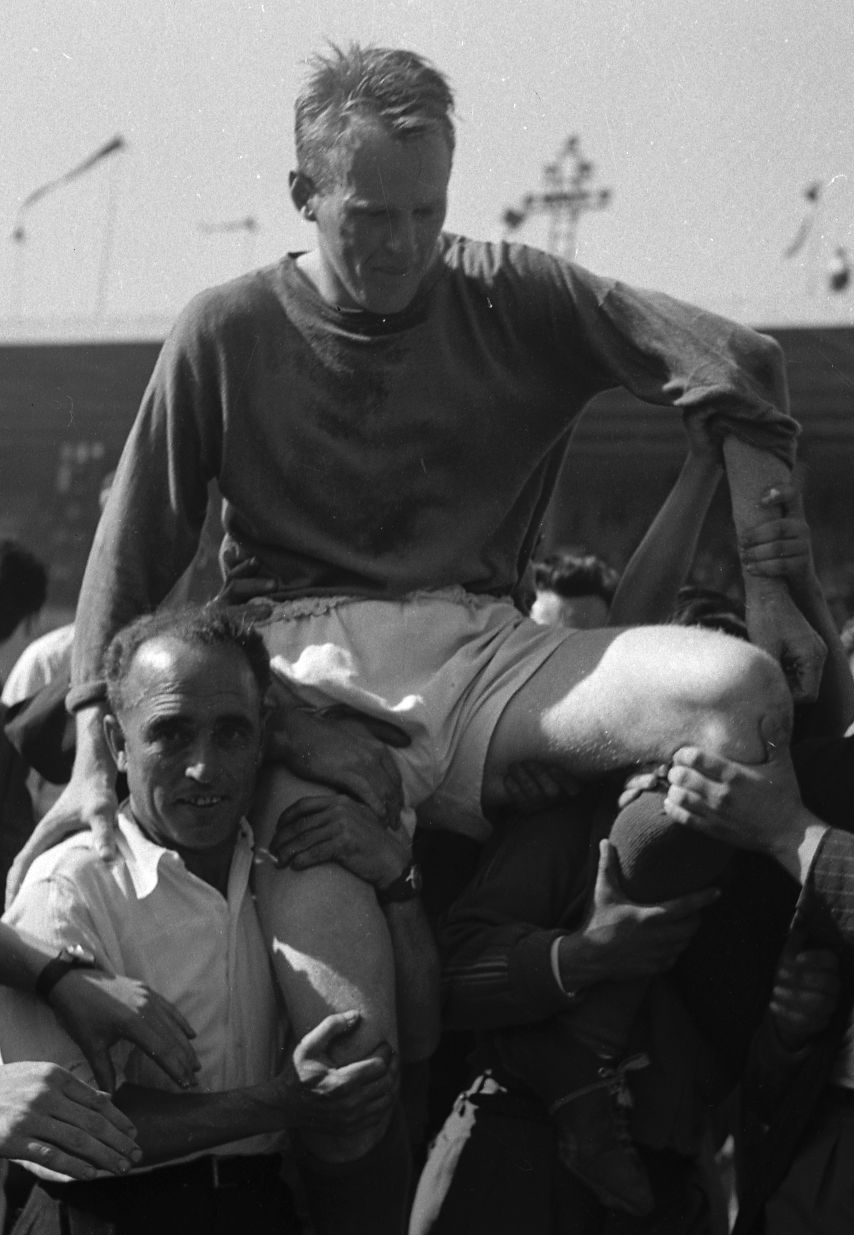
- Mellberg with Toulouse in 1953

Personal information
- Full name: Bror Lars Astley Mellberg
- Date of birth: 9 December 1923
- Place of birth: Karlstad, Sweden
- Date of death: 8 September 2004 (aged 80)
- Place of death: Lidingö, Sweden
- Height: 1.82 m (6 ft 0 in)
- Position: Forward

Youth career
- 1936–1940: Ambjörby IK
- 1941–1947: IK Viking

Senior career*
Years	Team	Apps	(Gls)
1947–1948	Karlstad BK		
1948–1950	AIK	21	(15)
1950–1952	Genoa	65	(23)
1952–1953	Toulouse	33	(27)
1953–1956	Red Star	103	(72)
1956–1957	Sochaux	25	(7)
1957–1961	AIK	62	(18)

International career
1948–1949	Sweden B	2	(1)
1949–1958	Sweden	6	(2)
Medal record
Representing Sweden
FIFA World Cup
Third place	1950 Brazil
- * Club domestic league appearances and goals

Bror Lars Astley Mellberg (9 December 1923 − 8 September 2004) was a Swedish footballer who played as a forward. He played for the Sweden national team at the 1950 FIFA World Cup and 1958 FIFA World Cup where Sweden finished third and second, respectively.

== Career statistics ==
=== International ===
Appearances and goals by national team and year
National team	Year	Apps	Goals
Sweden	1949	1	1
Sweden	1950	2	1
Sweden	1951	0	0
Sweden	1952	0	0
Sweden	1953	0	0
Sweden	1954	0	0
Sweden	1955	0	0
Sweden	1956	0	0
Sweden	1957	0	0
Sweden	1958	3	0
Total		6	2

Scores and results list Sweden's goal tally first, score column indicates score after each Mellberg goal.

List of international goals scored by Bror Mellberg
No.	Date	Venue	Opponent	Score	Result	Competition	Ref.
1	23 October 1949	Parken, Copenhagen, Denmark	Denmark	2–2	2–3	1948–51 Nordic Football Championship	
2	16 July 1950	Pacaembu Stadium, São Paulo, Brazil	Spain	2–0	3–1	1950 FIFA World Cup	

== Honours ==
Sweden

- FIFA World Cup runner-up: 1958
- FIFA World Cup third place: 1950
