= Per Bredesen =

Norwegian footballer (1930–2022)

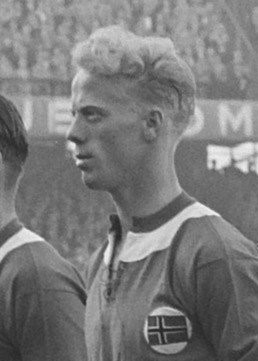
- Bredesen in 1951

Personal information
- Date of birth: 22 December 1930
- Place of birth: Horten, Norway
- Date of death: 3 October 2022 (aged 91)
- Height: 1.75 m (5 ft 9 in)
- Position: Inside right

Youth career
- Ørn Horten

Senior career*
| Years | Team | Apps | (Gls) |
| 1947–1952 | Ørn Horten | 49 | (16) |
| 1952–1955 | Lazio | 93 | (19) |
| 1955–1956 | Udinese | 34 | (15) |
| 1956–1958 | AC Milan | 27 | (6) |
| 1958–1959 | Bari | 21 | (5) |
| 1959–1961 | Messina | 39 | (5) |
| 1961–1962 | Ørn Horten | 13 | (9) |
| Total | | 276 | (75) |

International career
| 1949–1951 | Norway | 18 | (7) |

Managerial career
- 1963: Ørn Horten (player-manager)
- 1969: Ørn Horten
- 1970: Falk (player-manager)
- * Club domestic league appearances and goals

Per Bredesen (22 December 1930 – 3 October 2022) was a Norwegian footballer. He played as an inside forward for a number of Italian clubs, and was one of the first Norwegian footballers to achieve success in a foreign league.

== Club career ==
Bredesen began his career at his hometown team Ørn Horten in 1947 – only 16 years old, and quickly established himself as one of the league's most talented players.

In 1952, Bredesen became a professional when he was signed by Italian side Lazio. Because the Norwegian FA at the time allowed only amateur players to play for the national team, this move also ended Bredesen's international career.

Bredesen played three years at Lazio, and later played for Udinese, AC Milan, Bari and Messina. In 1957, as a member of Milan, he became the first Norwegian to win the Scudetto – the only one to do so until Leo Østigård won it with Napoli in 2023. Overall, Bredesen played 214 matches in Italian football and scored 50 goals. In 1961 he left Italy and moved back to Norway, where he rejoined Ørn Horten. He played his last match for Ørn-Horten in 1969.

== International career ==
Bredesen made his international debut against Yugoslavia as an 18-year-old in 1949, and marked the event by scoring a fine goal. Overall, Bredesen won 18 caps and scored seven goals for Norway. He was not selected for Norway after moving abroad, since the Norwegian FA had a strict rule of only using amateur footballers.

== Personal life and death ==
Bredesen died on 3 October 2022, at the age of 91.

== Career statistics ==
=== Club ===
Appearances and goals by club, season and competition
| Club | Season | League | | | Cup (Note: Includes Norwegian Cup, Coppa Italia) | | Continental (Note: Includes 1957 Latin Cup and 1957–58 European Cup) | | Total | |
| Club | Season | Division | Apps | Goals | Apps | Goals | Apps | Goals | Apps | Goals |
|---|---|---|---|---|---|---|---|---|---|---|
| Ørn Horten | 1947–48 | Norgesserien | | | | | — | | | |
| Ørn Horten | 1948–49 | Hovedserien | 14 | 2 | | | — | | 14 | 2 |
| Ørn Horten | 1949–50 | Hovedserien | 14 | 2 | | | — | | 14 | 2 |
| Ørn Horten | 1950–51 | Hovedserien | 14 | 9 | | | — | | 14 | 9 |
| Ørn Horten | 1951–52 | Hovedserien | 7 | 3 | | | — | | 7 | 3 |
| Lazio | 1952–53 | Serie A | 32 | 6 | — | | — | | 32 | 6 |
| Lazio | 1953–54 | Serie A | 32 | 6 | — | | — | | 32 | 6 |
| Lazio | 1954–55 | Serie A | 29 | 7 | — | | — | | 29 | 7 |
| Lazio | Total | | 93 | 19 | 0 | 0 | 0 | 0 | 39 | 19 |
| Udinese | 1955–56 | Serie B | 34 | 15 | — | | — | | 34 | 15 |
| Milan | 1956–57 | Serie A | 27 | 6 | — | | 2 | 1 | 29 | 7 |
| Milan | 1957–58 | Serie A | 0 | 0 | 4 | 1 | 2 | 0 | 6 | 1 |
| Milan | Total | | 27 | 6 | 4 | 1 | 4 | 1 | 35 | 8 |
| Bari | 1958–59 | Serie A | 21 | 5 | | | — | | 21 | 5 |
| Messina | 1959–60 | Serie B | 14 | 2 | | | — | | 14 | 2 |
| Messina | 1960–61 | Serie B | 25 | 3 | | | — | | 25 | 3 |
| Messina | Total | | 39 | 5 | | | 0 | 0 | 39 | 5 |
| Ørn-Horten | 1961–62 | Hovedserien | 13 | 9 | | | — | | 13 | 9 |
| Career total | | | 276 | 75 | 4 | 1 | 4 | 1 | 284 | 77 |

=== International ===
Appearances and goals by national team and year
| National team | Year | Apps | Goals |
|---|---|---|---|
| Norway | 1949 | 4 | 3 |
| Norway | 1950 | 6 | 2 |
| Norway | 1951 | 8 | 2 |
| Total | | 18 | 7 |

Scores and results list Norway's goal tally first, score column indicates score after each Bredesen goal.

List of international goals scored by Per Bredesen
| No. | Date | Venue | Opponent | Score | Result | Competition |
|---|---|---|---|---|---|---|
| 1 | 19 June 1949 | Ullevaal Stadion, Oslo, Norway | Yugoslavia | 1–0 | 1–3 | Friendly |
| 2 | 2 October 1949 | Råsunda Stadium, Solna, Sweden | Sweden | 1–0 | 3–3 | 1948–51 Nordic Football Championship |
| 3 | 2 October 1949 | Råsunda Stadium, Solna, Sweden | Sweden | 3–3 | 3–3 | 1948–51 Nordic Football Championship |
| 4 | 10 September 1950 | Ullevaal Stadion, Oslo, Norway | Finland | 1–0 | 4–1 | 1948–51 Nordic Football Championship |
| 5 | 26 November 1950 | Dalymount Park, Dublin, Ireland | Republic of Ireland | 1–0 | 2–2 | Friendly |
| 6 | 16 August 1951 | Helsinki Olympic Stadium, Helsinki, Finland | Finland | 1–1 | 1–1 | 1948–51 Nordic Football Championship |
| 7 | 30 September 1951 | Gamla Ullevi, Gothenburg, Sweden | Sweden | 3–3 | 4–3 | 1948–51 Nordic Football Championship |
