= Aulis Rytkönen =

Finnish footballer (1929-2014)

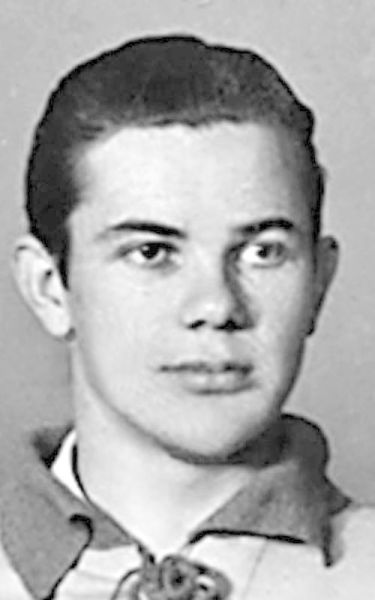

Personal information
- Date of birth: 5 January 1929
- Place of birth: Karttula, Finland
- Date of death: 16 April 2014 (aged 85)
- Place of death: Helsinki, Finland
- Position: Striker

Youth career
- –1945: Kuopion työväen urheilijat

Senior career*
Years	Team	Apps	(Gls)
1945–1952	KuPS	126	(66)
1952–1960	Toulouse	120	(33)
1960–1966	HJK Helsinki	85	(28)

International career
1948–1964	Finland	37	(7)

Managerial career
- 1960–1971: HJK Helsinki
- 1975–1978: Finland
- * Club domestic league appearances and goals

Taavi Aulis Rytkönen (5 January 1929 – 16 April 2014) was a Finnish footballer. He became the country's first professional player when he signed for France's Toulouse FC in 1952.

In total Rytkönen spent eight seasons (1952–1960) in France, winning the French Cup in 1957. A forward, he started his career in Finland with KuPS Kuopio in 1945, and after returning from France he worked as player-coach of HJK Helsinki 1960–1966 and as coach 1967–1971.

Rytkönen earned 37 caps for the Finnish national team, scoring seven goals. He played for Finland at the 1952 Summer Olympics in Helsinki. He also worked as national coach from 1975 to 1978. He was chosen Finland's Player of the Year in 1949, 1950, and 1952.

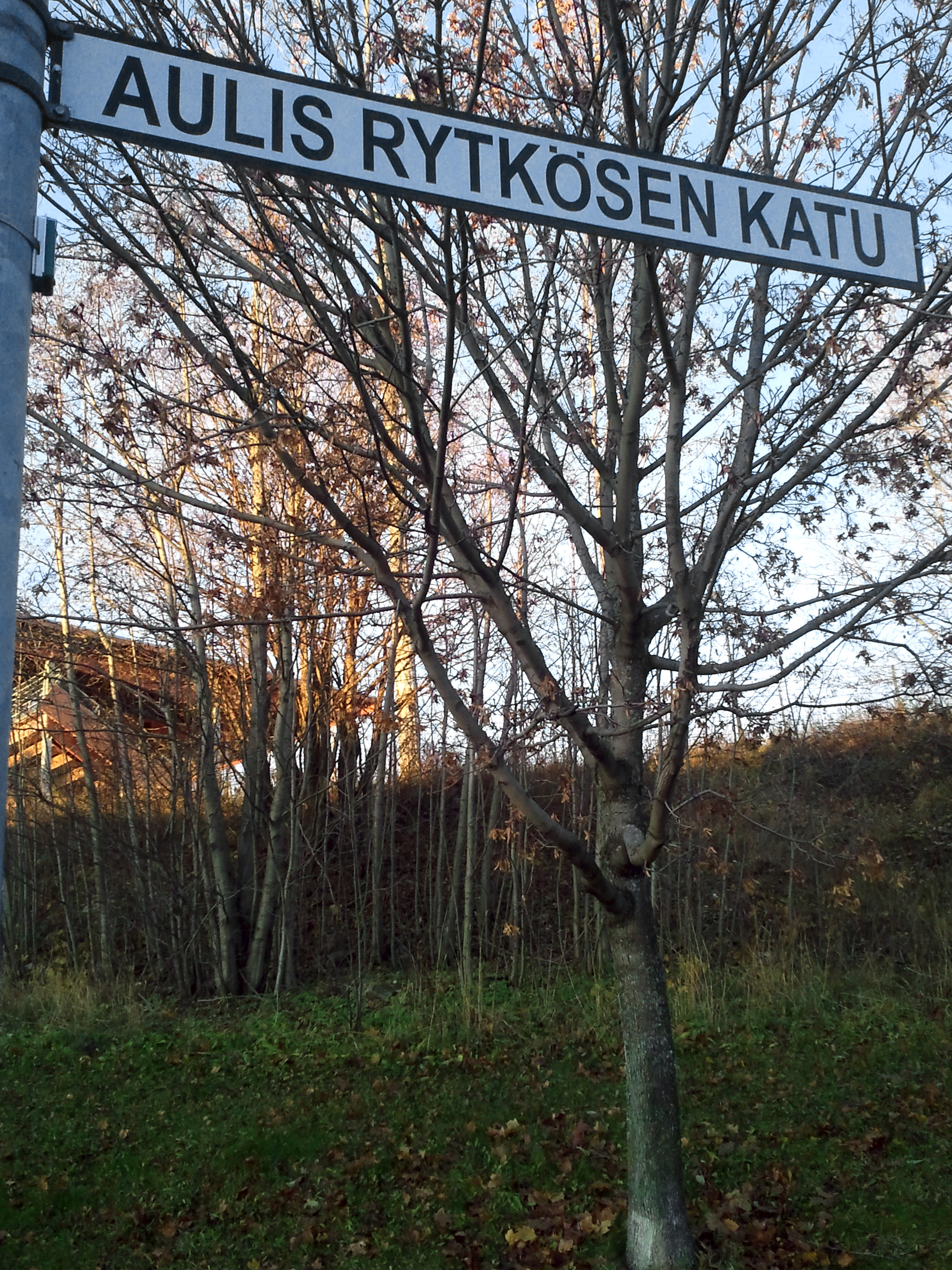
Aulis Rytkönen Street in Kuopio. Kuopion keskuskenttä in the background.
