= Holger Seebach =

Danish footballer (1922–2011)

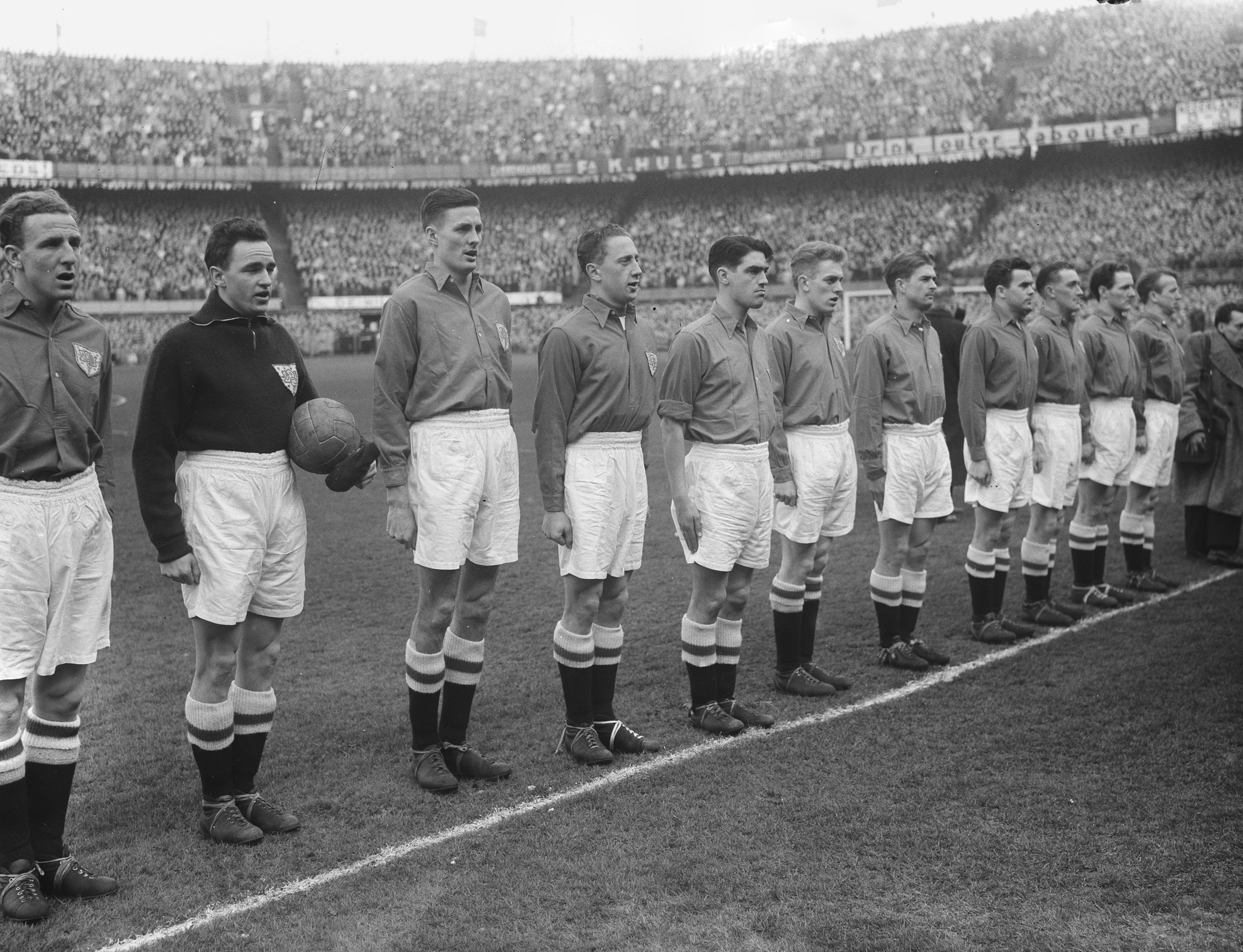
- Seebach w. Danish national team (1953)

Personal information
- Date of birth: 17 March 1922
- Place of birth: Aarhus, Denmark
- Date of death: 30 August 2011 (aged 89)
- Place of death: Odense, Denmark
- Position: Forward

Senior career*
Years	Team	Apps	(Gls)
1939–1941	B 1913		
1942–1944	OB		
1945–1956	AB		

International career
1947–1953	Denmark	17	(9)
Medal record
Men's Football
Representing Denmark
Bronze medal – third place	1948 London	Team
- * Club domestic league appearances and goals

Holger Seebach (17 March 1922 – 30 August 2011) was a Danish amateur footballer, who scored 9 goals in 17 games for the Denmark national football team, won a bronze medal at the 1948 Summer Olympics and competed in the 1952 Summer Olympics. Holger Seebach was one of five players from the same Odense Boldklub team, including Jørgen Leschly Sørensen and Svend Jørgen Hansen, who moved to Copenhagen and were selected for the Danish national team. During this period he played for AB and won four Danish championships.

Seebach was a wing attacker who tried to score from all angles, and he was known as "always-good-for-a-goal"-Seebach among both teammates and opposition players. Knud Lundberg mentioned him in his book Fodboldens ABC that he had asked Holger Seebach about his goal scoring tactics, and Holger Seebach replied that he used to aim for the goalkeeper but miss him. Knud Lundberg replied that he had tried that tactic without success. He declined an offer from an Italian club to become the second Danish professional football player, and instead focused on his studies in engineering at the Technical University of Denmark.

== Personal life ==
Seebach is related to musicians Tommy Seebach and his sons Nicolai and Rasmus Seebach. Rasmus Seebach's son, Holger, is named after the football player. He studied as a carpenter and later got a Cand. Polit. Engineering degree from Odense Technical University where he continued to work until his retirement in 1999 at the age of 77. He was married twice and is the father of 2 children, Dorte Seebach and Torben Seebach

== Honours ==
AB

- Danish Championship: 1944–45, 1946–47, 1950–51, 1951–52

Denmark

- Olympic Bronze Medal: 1948
