= Hasse Jeppson =

Swedish footballer (1925–2013)

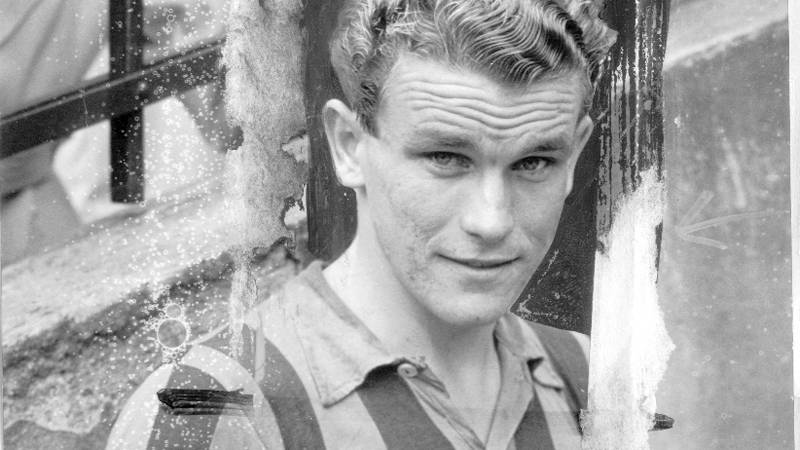
- Jeppson with Djurgården in 1951

Personal information
- Full name: Hans Olof Jeppson
- Date of birth: 10 May 1925
- Place of birth: Kungsbacka, Sweden
- Date of death: 21 February 2013 (aged 87)
- Place of death: Rome, Italy
- Position: Striker

Senior career*
Years	Team	Apps	(Gls)
1946–1947	Örgryte	28	(40)
1948–1951	Djurgården	51	(58)
1951	Charlton Athletic	11	(9)
1951–1952	Atalanta	27	(22)
1952–1956	Napoli	112	(52)
1956–1957	Torino	19	(7)
Total		220	(148)

International career
1949–1950	Sweden	12	(9)
Medal record
Representing Sweden
FIFA World Cup
Third place	1950 Brazil
- * Club domestic league appearances and goals

Hans Olof "Hasse" Jeppson (10 May 1925 – 21 February 2013) was a Swedish professional footballer who played as a striker. He was known for his impressive goals to games ratio at several clubs, and represented Kungsbacka IF) Örgryte, Djurgården, Charlton Athletic, Atalanta, Napoli and Torino during a career that spanned between 1946 and 1957. A full international between 1949 and 1950, he won 12 caps and scored nine goals for the Sweden national team and helped them to a third-place finish at the 1950 FIFA World Cup.

== Club career ==
Jeppson began his career with Djurgården, transferring to Charlton Athletic, where he played 11 matches in 1951, before moving to Italy to join Atalanta (1951–1952). Jeppson was the second Swedish player to be transferred to an English team, after Dan Ekner at Portsmouth.

He then moved to Napoli (1952–56) and Torino (1956–57) in the 1950s. In 1951, he was bought from Atalanta. In 1952, he was sold to Napoli for 105 million lira, a new world record transfer-fee (for this reason the Napoli's fans nicknamed him o' banco e' napule, the bank of Naples). Jeppson played for Napoli from 1952 to 1956 scoring 52 goals. In 1956, Jeppson was sold to Torino. He retired in 1957.

== International career ==
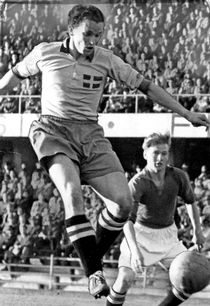
Hasse Jeppson playing for Sweden

Jeppson played the 1950 FIFA World Cup in Brazil for Sweden and scored two goals as Sweden finished third. He played 12 games in total for the Sweden national team and scored nine goals. His Swedish nickname was Hasse Guldfot (Hasse Golden Foot).

== Career statistics ==
=== International ===
Appearances and goals by national team and year
National team	Year	Apps	Goals
Sweden	1949	7	5
Sweden	1950	5	4
Total		12	9

Scores and results list Sweden's goal tally first, score column indicates score after each Jeppson goal.

List of international goals scored by Hasse Jeppson
No.	Date	Venue	Opponent	Score	Result	Competition	Ref.
1	13 May 1949	Råsunda Stadium, Solna, Sweden	England	2–0	3–1	Friendly	
2	2 June 1949	Råsunda Stadium, Solna, Sweden	Republic of Ireland	2–1	3–1	1950 FIFA World Cup qualification	
3	19 June 1949	Råsunda Stadium, Solna, Sweden	Hungary	1–2	2–2	Friendly	
4	2 October 1949	Råsunda Stadium, Solna, Sweden	Norway	2–2	3–3	1948–51 Nordic Football Championship	
5	23 October 1949	Parken, Copenhagen, Denmark	Denmark	1–0	2–3	1948–51 Nordic Football Championship	
6	8 June 1950	Råsunda Stadium, Solna, Sweden	Netherlands	1–0	4–1	Friendly	
7	8 June 1950	Råsunda Stadium, Solna, Sweden	Netherlands	4–1	4–1	Friendly	
8	25 June 1950	Pacaembu Stadium, São Paulo, Brazil	Italy	1–1	3–2	1950 FIFA World Cup	
9	25 June 1950	Pacaembu Stadium, São Paulo, Brazil	Italy	3–1	3–2	1950 FIFA World Cup	

== Honours ==
Djurgården

- Division 2 Nordöstra: 1948–49

Sweden

- FIFA World Cup third place: 1950

Individual

- Allsvenskan top scorer: 1950–51
- Stor Grabb: 1950
- Serie A Team of The Year: 1952, 1953, 1954
- Swedish Football Hall of Fame inductee: 2009
