= Gunnar Dahlen =

Norwegian footballer (1918–2004)

Personal information
- Date of birth: 28 April 1918
- Place of birth: Verdal Municipality, Norway
- Date of death: 21 May 2004 (aged 86)

Senior career*
| Years | Team | Apps | (Gls) |
- SK Freidig

International career
| 1947–1952 | Norway | 19 | (4) |
- * Club domestic league appearances and goals

Gunnar Dahlen (28 April 1918 – 21 May 2004) was a Norwegian football player. He was born in Verdal Municipality, and played for the sports club SK Freidig. He played for the Norwegian national team at the 1952 Summer Olympics in Helsinki. He was capped 19 times, scoring four goals, for Norway between 1947 and 1952.
