= Ingvar Rydell =

Swedish footballer

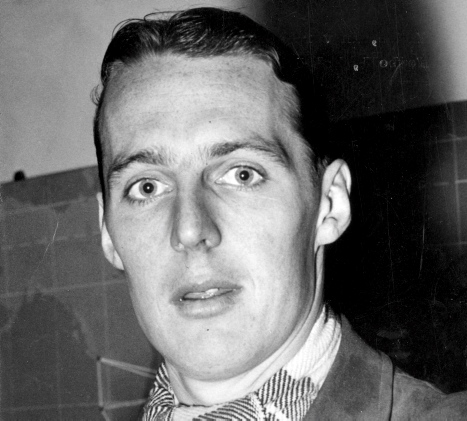
- Ingvar Rydell in 1951

Personal information
- Full name: Gustav Ingvar Rydell
- Date of birth: 7 May 1922
- Place of birth: Bäcke, Sweden
- Date of death: 20 June 2013 (aged 91)
- Place of death: Höllviken, Sweden
- Position: Forward

Senior career*
| Years | Team | Apps | (Gls) |
| 1947–1953 | Malmö FF | 107 | (68) |

International career
| 1948–1952 | Sweden | 13 | (9) |
Medal record
Representing Sweden
FIFA World Cup
| Third place | 1950 Brazil |
Olympic Games
| Bronze medal – third place | 1952 Helsinki |
- * Club domestic league appearances and goals

Gustav Ingvar Rydell (7 May 1922 – 20 June 2013) was a Swedish football forward who played for Malmö FF. He also represented Sweden in the 1950 FIFA World Cup in Brazil. and won a bronze medal at the 1952 Summer Olympics in Finland.
