= Jorma Vaihela =

Finnish footballer (1925-2006)

Personal information
- Full name: Jorma Johan Sigurd Vaihela
- Date of birth: 30 September 1925
- Place of birth: Raahe, Finland
- Date of death: 9 February 2006 (aged 80)
- Place of death: Kungälv, Sweden
- Position: Inside forward

Senior career*
Years	Team	Apps	(Gls)
1946–1948	TuTo		
1949	PoPa		
1950–1951	RU-38		
1952–1954	TuTo		
1954–1957	IK Oddevold	34	(0)

International career
1947–1954	Finland	34	(13)
- * Club domestic league appearances and goals

Jorma Johan Sigurd Vaihela (30 September 1925 – 9 February 2006) was a Finnish international footballer who played as an inside forward.

== Club career ==
Born in Raahe, Vaihela played club football in Finland for TuTo, PoPa and RU-38, and in Sweden for IK Oddevold. He started his career playing for Turun Toverit in TUL league for 2 seasons where he scored 6 goals. In Mestaruussarja he played 31 games and scored 7 goals. Between 1949 and 1953 he also played in second tier Suomensarja where he scored 30 goals in 5 seasons.

== International career ==
Vaihela earned 34 caps at international level between 1947 and 1954, scoring 13 goals. Vaihela also participated in the 1952 Summer Olympics.

== Personal life ==
Vaihela's son Seppo played international bandy for Sweden, and worked as the chairman of IFK Göteborg from 2007 to 2012, and before that as president for the Swedish Bandy Association.
