= List of Israeli Americans =

This is a list of notable Israeli Americans. It includes both original immigrants who obtained American citizenship, and their American descendants. The list is ordered by category of human endeavor. Persons with significant contributions in two fields are listed in both pertinent categories, to facilitate easy lookup.

To be included in this list, the person must have a Wikipedia article showing they are Israeli American.

== Academics ==
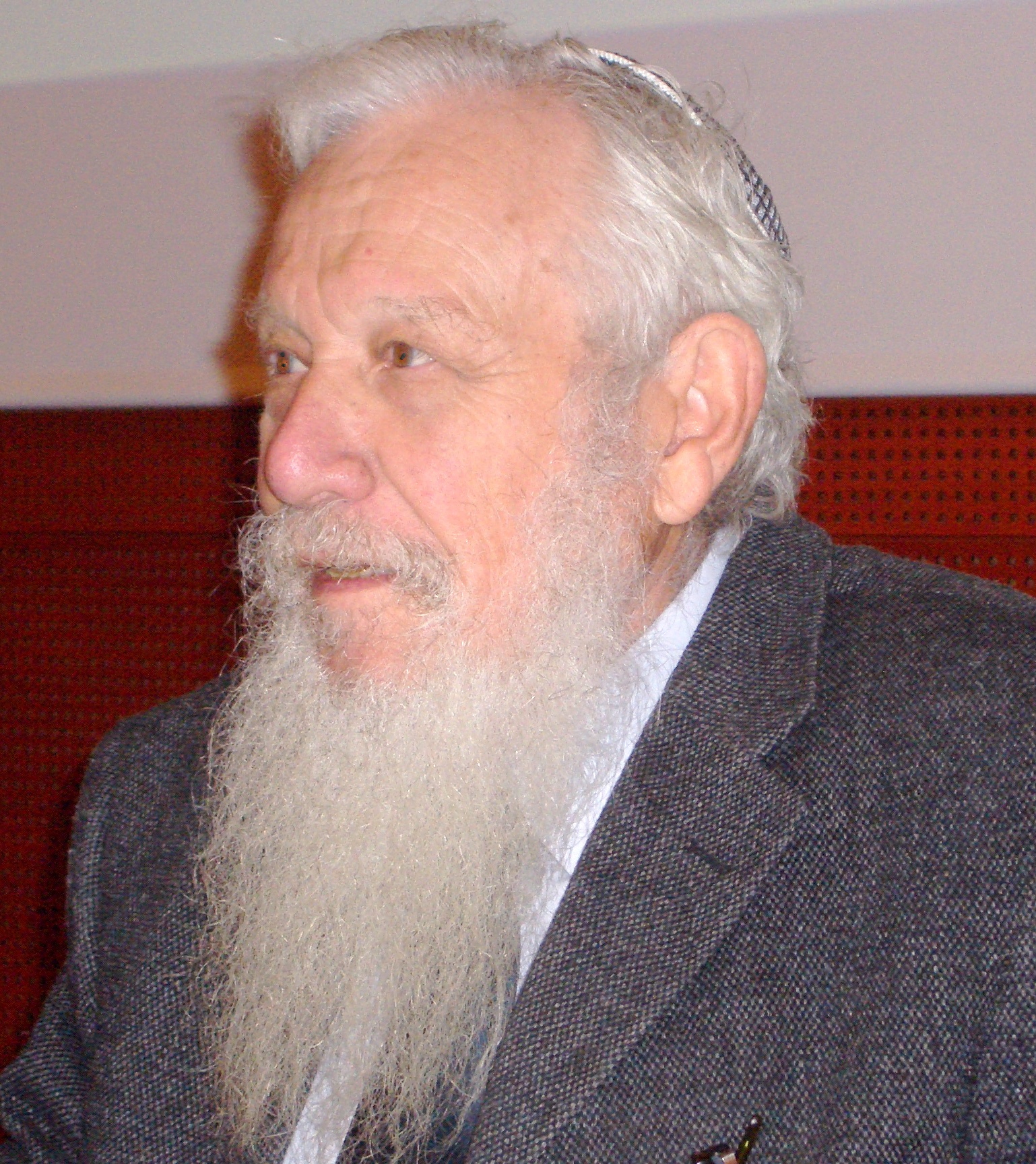
Nobel laureate Robert Aumann

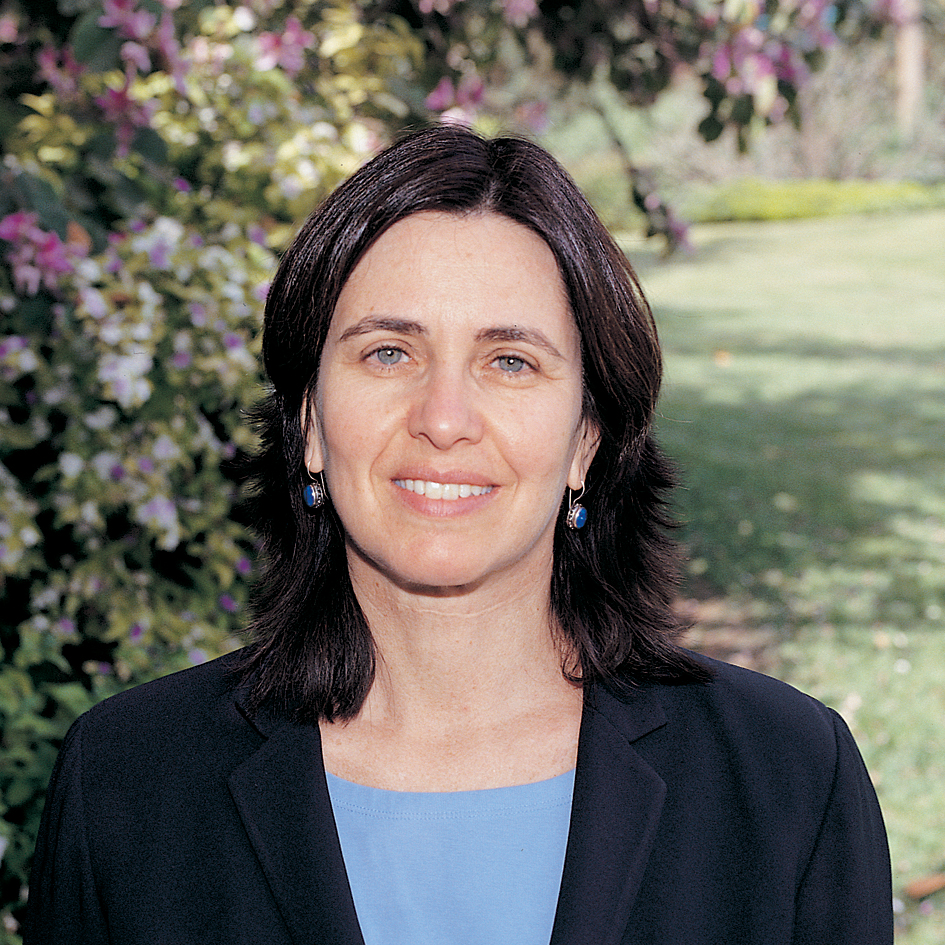
Shafi Goldwasser

- Ichak Adizes, management expert and best-selling author
- Reuven Amitai, historian, writer, and Dean of the Faculty of Humanities at the Hebrew University
- Dan Ariely, economist and author
- Robert Aumann, Nobel laureate
- Baruch Awerbuch, professor of computer science at Johns Hopkins University
- Arie S. Belldegrun, director of the UCLA Institute of Urologic Oncology and is professor and Chief of Urologic Oncology at the David Geffen School of Medicine
- Merav Ben-David, ecologist and zoologist
- Yochai Benkler, Berkman Professor of Entrepreneurial Legal Studies at Harvard Law School, and author
- Yossef Bodansky, Israeli-born American political scientist
- Yaron Brook, president and executive director of the Ayn Rand Institute
- Idit Harel Caperton, educational psychologist and epistemologist
- Avner Cohen, political scientist and historian well known his path-breaking history of the Israeli nuclear program and strategic policy
- Ezekiel Emanuel, bioethicist
- Zvi Galil (born 1947), computer scientist, mathematician, and President of Tel Aviv University
- Gerson Goldhaber, particle physicist and astrophysicist
- Sulamith Goldhaber, high-energy physicist and molecular spectroscopist
- Michael Goldsmith, law professor at Brigham Young University's J. Reuben Clark Law School
- Shafrira Goldwasser, professor of electrical engineering and computer science at MIT, and professor of mathematical sciences at the Weizmann Institute of Science
- Amos Grunebaum, ObGyn physician, inventor, professor Zucker School of Medicine
- Amos N. Guiora, professor of law at the S. J. Quinney College of Law, University of Utah, and an expert on drone attacks
- Rabbi David Weiss Halivni, Israeli-American world-acclaimed scholar in the domain of Jewish Sciences and professor of Talmud
- Michael Harris, political scientist, author, and professor
- David Hazony, author and editor of The Tower Magazine
- Daniel Kahneman, Nobel laureate
- Ehud Kalai, Israeli-born American game theorist and mathematical economist, and James J. O’Connor Distinguished Professor of Decision and Game Sciences at Northwestern University
- Avi Loeb, astronomer
- Mario Livio, astrophysicist and author
- Jessica Meir, post-doctoral researcher in comparative physiology at the University of British Columbia
- Don Patinkin, monetary economist and the president of Hebrew University of Jerusalem
- Ithiel de Sola Pool, researcher in the field of social sciences
- Avital Ronell, philosopher, professor at New York University
- Emmanuel David Tannenbaum, biophysicist and applied mathematician, professor and researcher at the Ben-Gurion University of the Negev and the Georgia Institute of Technology
- Rina Tannenbaum, materials scientist and chemical engineer and presently Professor at the University of Alabama at Birmingham
- Amnon Yariv, professor of applied physics and electrical engineering at California Institute of Technology
- Moshe Vardi, professor of computer science at Rice University

== Actors ==
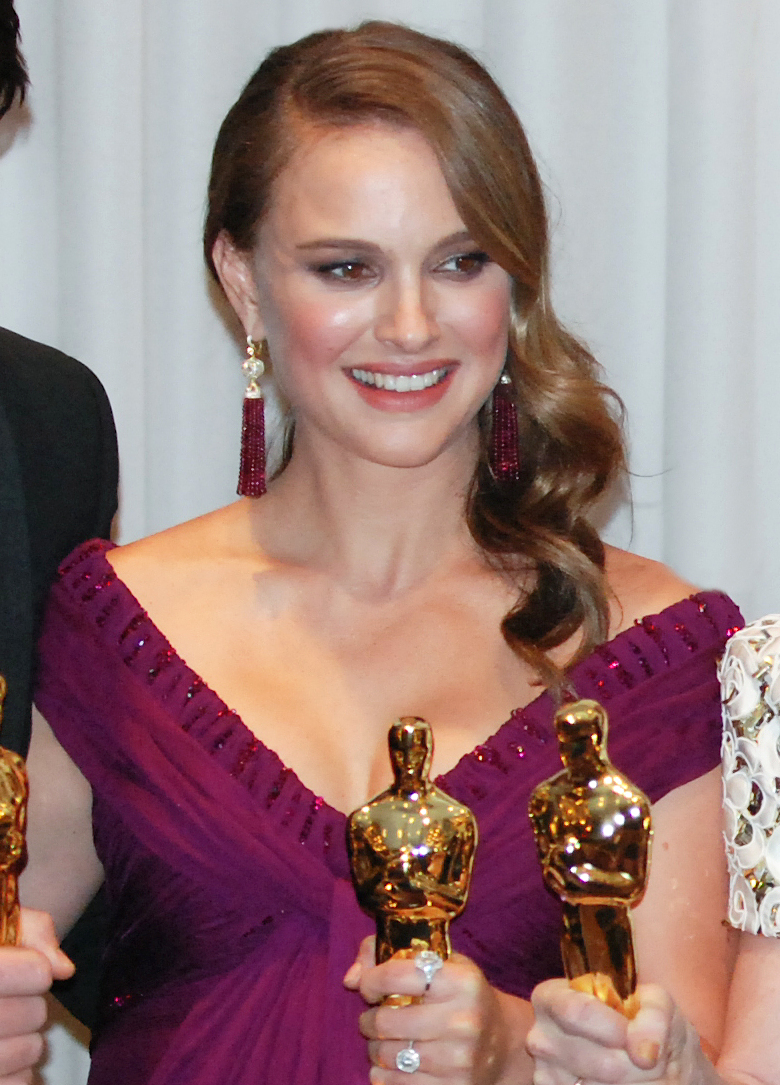
Natalie Portman

- Shiri Appleby, film and television actress
- Mili Avital, Israeli-born actress (Stargate)
- Amir Blumenfeld, Israeli-American writer, comedian, actor, and television host
- Steve Bond, Israeli-born television actor and model
- Yaniv Rokah, actor
- Assaf Cohen, actor
- Oded Fehr Israeli/American film and television actor (The Mummy, Resident Evil: Extinction)
- Alona Tal, actress
- Hani Furstenberg, actress
- Brian George, actor and voice actor
- Omri Katz, Israeli/American actor (Eerie, Indiana, Hocus Pocus)
- Amos Lavi, stage and film actor, won three Ophir Awards (Sh'Chur, Nashim and Zirkus Palestina)
- Grayson McCouch, actor
- Jonah Lotan, actor
- Judith Light, actress
- Vince Offer, "the ShamWow! Guy", Israeli-American actor known for his appearance in the infomercials for the absorbent towels ShamWow during the 2000s
- Natalie Portman, Israeli-born American film star
- Daniella Rabbani, Israeli/American actress, singer, and voiceover artist
- Modi Rosenfeld, stand-up comedian, actor, and cantor
- Odeya Rush, television and film actress (The Odd Life of Timothy Green, The Giver)
- Scott L. Schwartz, film and television actor and stuntman, and former professional wrestler
- Tami Stronach, Israeli-American actress (The Neverending Story)
- Raviv Ullman, Israeli-born American actor, teen idol (Phil of the Future)
- Inbar Lavi, actress
- Yael Grobglas, actress

== Arts and entertainment ==
- Carmit Bachar, singer, dancer, model, actress and showgirl; member of The Pussycat Dolls (Israeli father)
- Ralph Bakshi, Israeli-born animation film director. Bakshi was born in Haifa in 1938.
- Amir Bar-Lev, film director, producer, and writer
- Rhea Carmi, abstract expressionist and mixed-media artist
- Elinor Carucci, photographer
- Kosha Dillz, rapper
- Lyor Cohen, North American chairman and CEO of Recorded Music for Warner Music Group (WMG)
- Neil Druckmann, Israeli-born American writer, creative director and programmer for the video game developer Naughty Dog
- Ari Emanuel, talent agent and co-CEO of William Morris Endeavor (WME), and basis for the character Ari Gold on the TV show Entourage
- Amos Gitai, auteur filmmaker
- Usher Morgan, filmmaker, businessman and studio executive
- Maira Kalman, Israeli-born American illustrator, author, artist and designer
- Yael Kanarek, artist
- Ethan Klein, Israeli-American YouTuber and podcast host
- Hila Klein, Israeli-born American podcast host and fashion designer, who is also the wife of Ethan Klein
- Shuki Levy, Israeli-born American music composer whose best known work is soundtrack compositions for children's television programs of the 1980s.
- Rod Lurie, director, screenwriter, and film critic
- Arnon Milchan, Israeli-American film producer and businessman who produced many films such as The War of the Roses, Once Upon a Time in America, Pretty Woman, Natural Born Killers, The Devil's Advocate, and L.A. Confidential
- Oren Moverman, Israeli-American film director/screenwriter
- Avi Nesher, Israeli-born film producer, film director, screenwriter and actor
- Sassona Norton, Israeli-born sculptor and painter
- Eran Preis, director, screenwriter, playwright, and producer
- Lior Ron, composer
- Ari Sandel, film director (West Bank Story)
- Ophrah Shemesh, artist
- Boaz Yakin, screenwriter and film director
- Orna Guralnik, clinical psychologist, academic and lead of Showtime's Couples Therapy

== Business ==
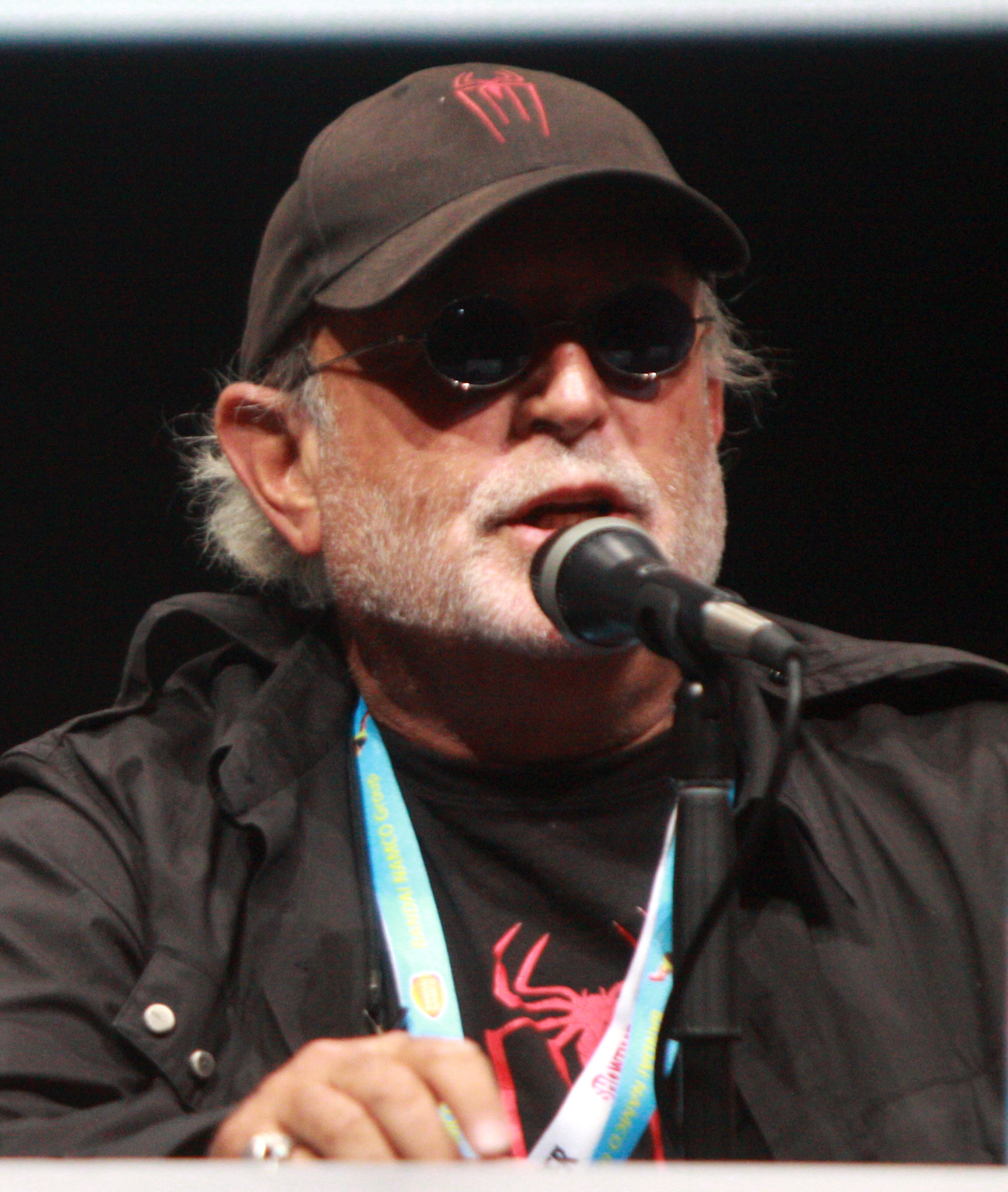
Avi Arad

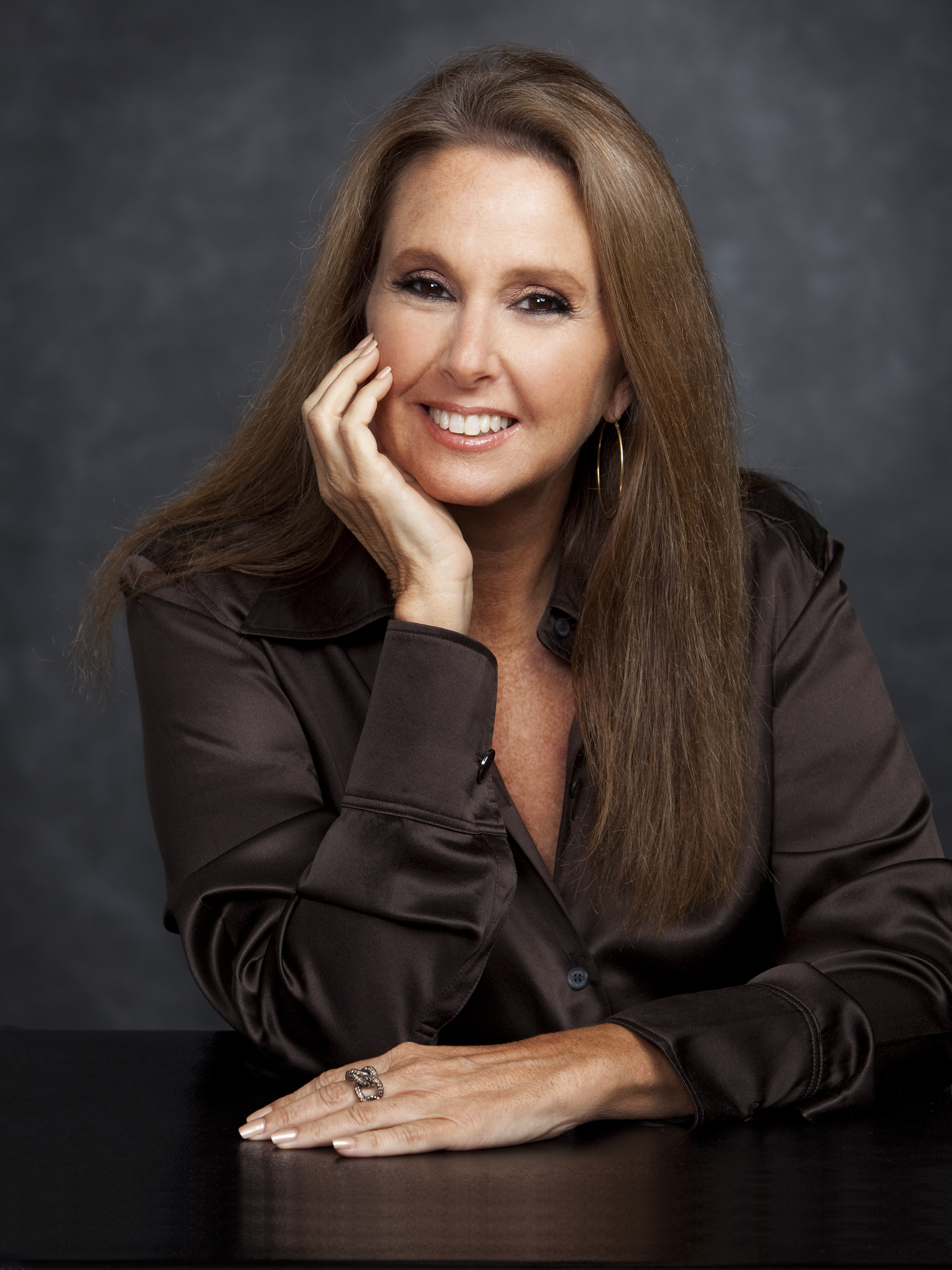
Shari Arison

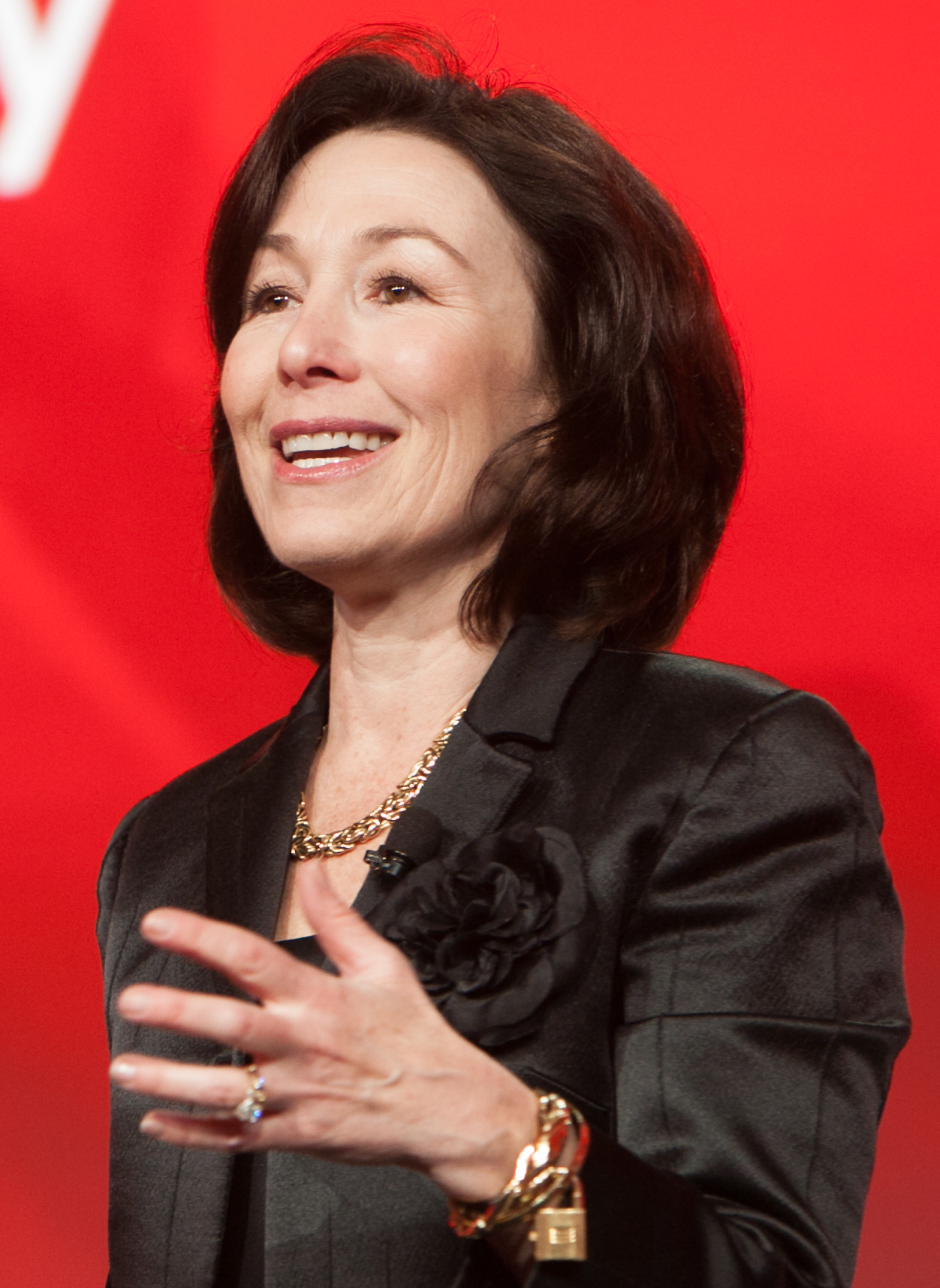
Safra Catz

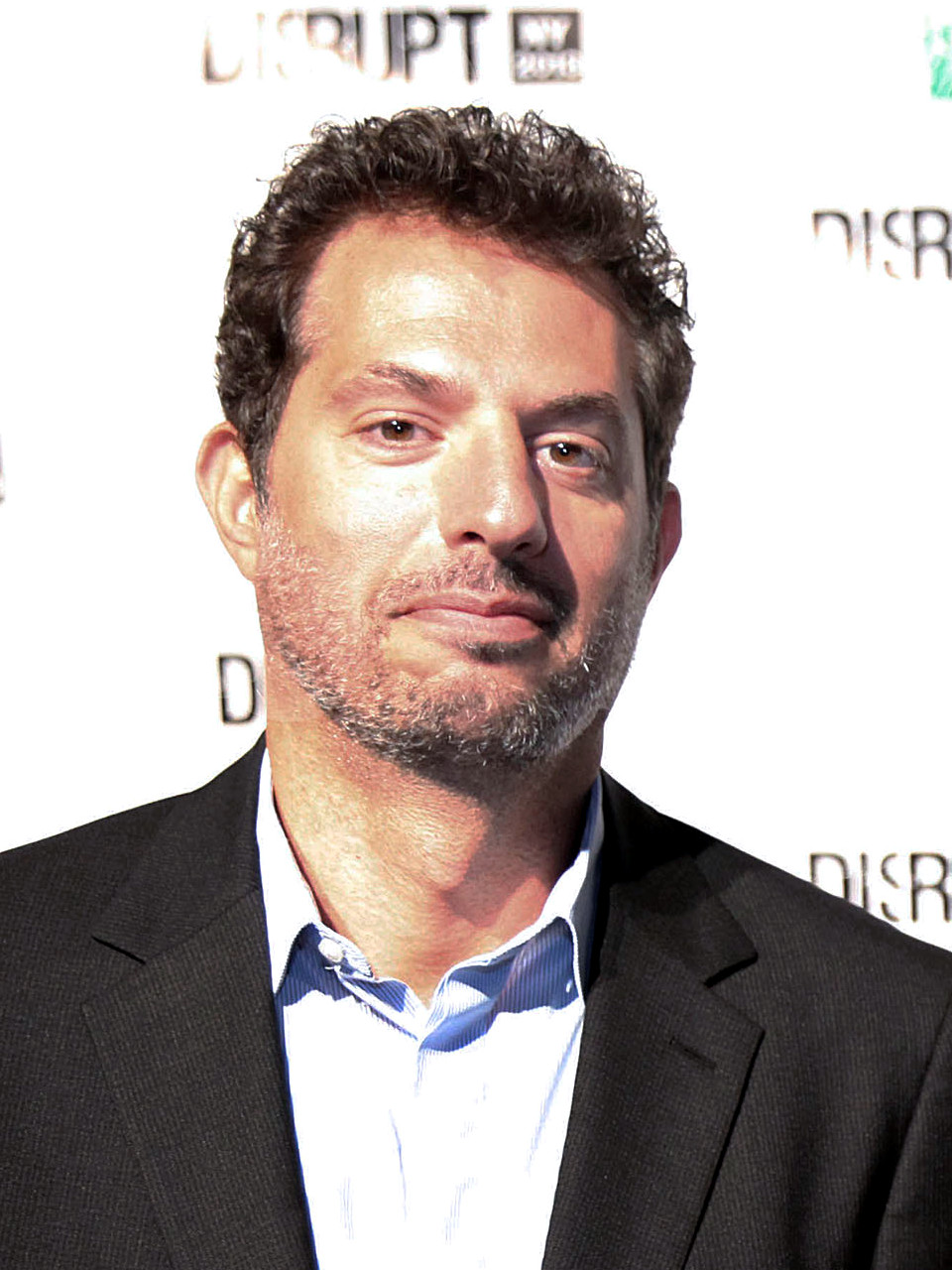
Guy Oseary

- Shai Agassi, entrepreneur, founder and former CEO of Better Place
- Ori Allon, founder of Compass, Inc., a residential real estate broker
- Avi Arad, Israeli-American businessman, founder of Marvel Studios
- Shari Arison, American-born Israeli businesswoman and philanthropist, one of Israel's wealthiest women
- Arison family, founders of Carnival Cruise Lines, the largest cruise line in the world
- Naftali Bennett, politician, former software entrepreneur, and former Prime Minister of Israel
- Yaron Brook, entrepreneur, author, and economist, who currently serves as the president and executive director of the Ayn Rand Institute
- Safra Catz, CEO of the Oracle Corporation
- Jacob Frenkel, economist and businessman; served as Governor of the Bank of Israel; currently the Chairman of JPMorgan Chase International
- Hillel Fuld, tech marketer and advisor, blogger and global tech speaker. CMO of Zula and Zcast among many other tech startup companies.
- Orit Gadiesh, corporate strategist and chairwoman of management consulting firm Bain & Company
- Gideon Gartner, entrepreneur and philanthropist, founder of Gartner, an information technology (IT) research and advisory company
- Yoram Globus, film producer, former co-owner of the Cannon Group, Inc.
- Noam Gottesman, former hedge fund manager; co-founded GLG Partners
- Andi Gutmans, co-founder of Zend Technologies, co-creator of PHP, General Manager at Amazon Web Services (AWS)
- Abraham Karem, inventor of the drone, founder of Karem Aircraft
- Ynon Kreiz, entrepreneur and businessman, former CEO of Fox Kids Europe, Endemol and Maker Studios
- Avi Lerner, film producer, co-founder of Nu Image, owner of Bulgaria-based Nu Boyana Film Studios
- Arnon Milchan, founder and owner of New Regency Films, second wealthiest mogul in Hollywood
- Adam Milstein, real estate investor, entrepreneur, and active philanthropist
- Adam Mosseri, head of Instagram
- Shaul Olmert, co-founder of online publishing platform Playbuzz, former VP of digital products for MTV Networks; son of Ehud Olmert
- Guy Oseary, Israeli-American businessman; Madonna's manager
- Isaac Perlmutter, chairman of Marvel Entertainment, former co-owner of Toy Biz
- Shai Reshef, educational entrepreneur and founder and president of University of the People
- Meshulam Riklis, businessman
- Lior Ron, entrepreneur, co-founder of autonomous trucking company Otto, former lead of Google Maps
- Haim Saban, television and media proprietor notable for his adaptations of Power Rangers; ranked by Forbes as the 98th richest person in America
- Tamir Sapir, Israeli-Georgian-American businessman; earned billions in the 1980s bartering fertilizers for oil; in 2006 was ranked at position 160 in list of the 400 richest Americans, with an estimated fortune of $2 billion
- Eli Tene, businessman, co-founder, co-managing director, and principal of the Peak Corporate Network
- Boaz Weinstein, derivatives trader and hedge fund manager, and founder of Saba Capital Management
- Jerry Zucker, former CEO of the InterTech Group and the Polymer Group

== Fashion ==
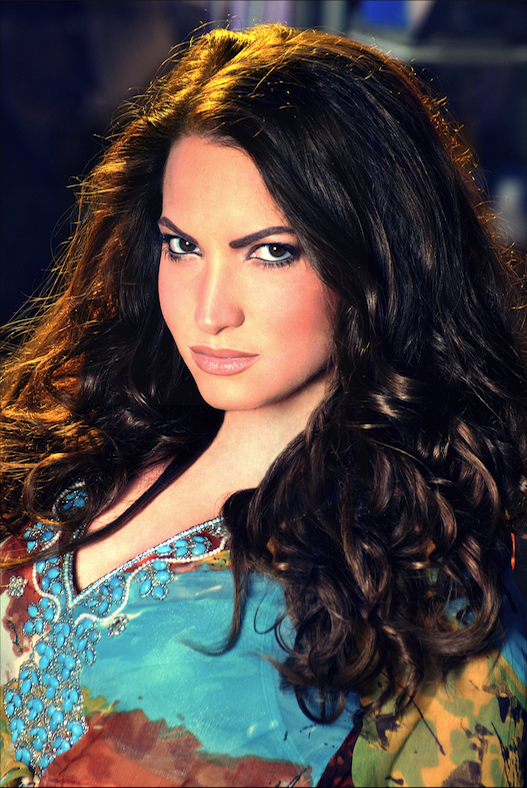
Yael Markovich

- Yigal Azrouël, fashion designer
- Donna Feldman, American model, daughter of Israeli parents
- Sharon Genish, Israeli/American model
- Yael Markovich, Israeli/American model
- Nili Lotan, fashion designer
- Max Rhyser, Danish-American-Israeli model, stage, television and film actor
- Yotam Solomon, fashion designer
- Elie Tahari, founder of fashion label Elie Tahari

== Government and politics ==
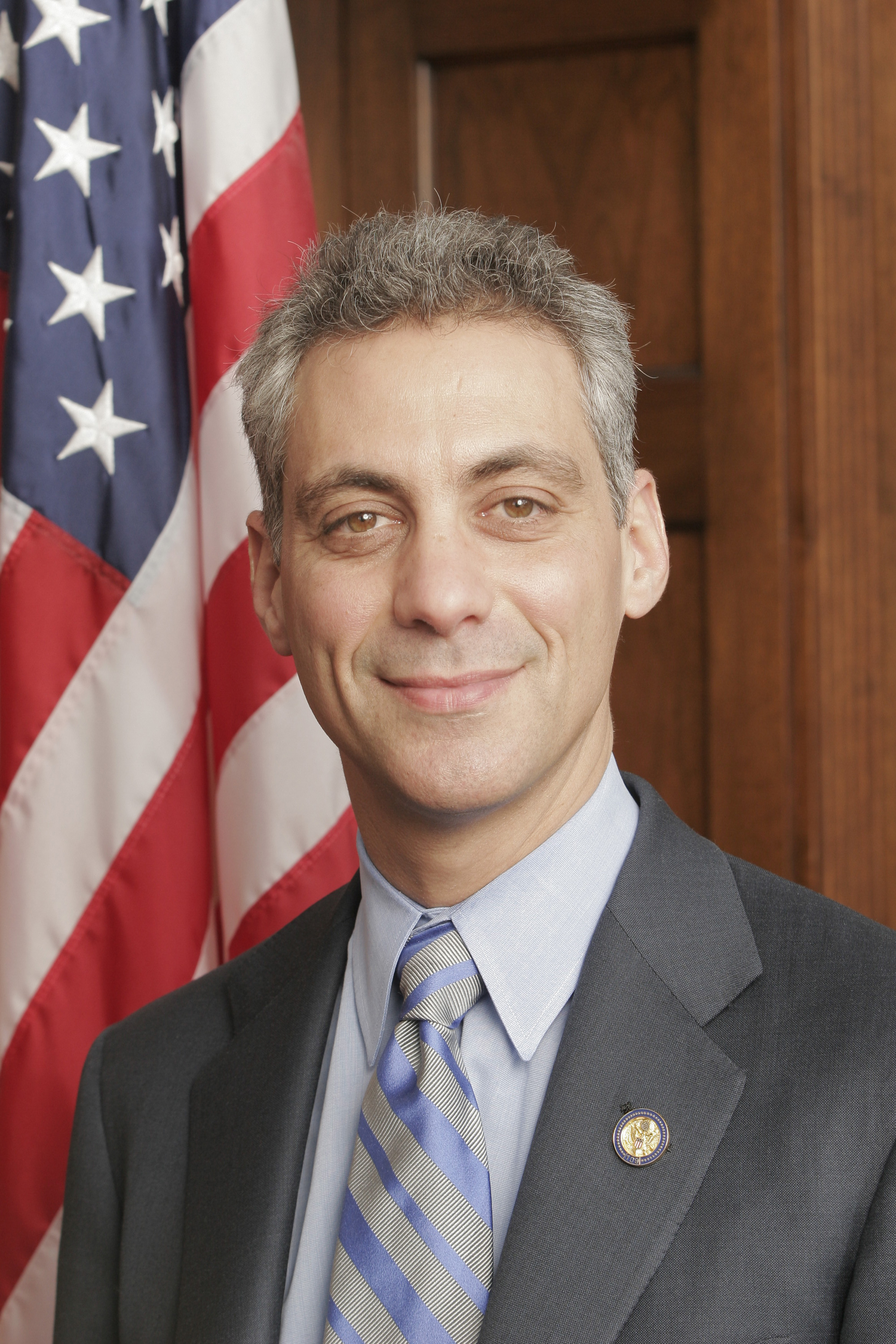
Rahm Emanuel

- Rahm Emanuel, Ambassador to Japan, former White House Chief of Staff and former mayor of Chicago
- Ari Ne'eman, disability rights activist
- Stanley Fischer, served as Governor of the Bank of Israel and later as Vice Chairman of the United States Federal Reserve
- Mazi Melesa Pilip, Ethiopian-born politician
- Josh Reinstein, director of the Knesset Christian Allies Caucus
- Nily Rozic, New York state assemblywoman

== Journalism ==
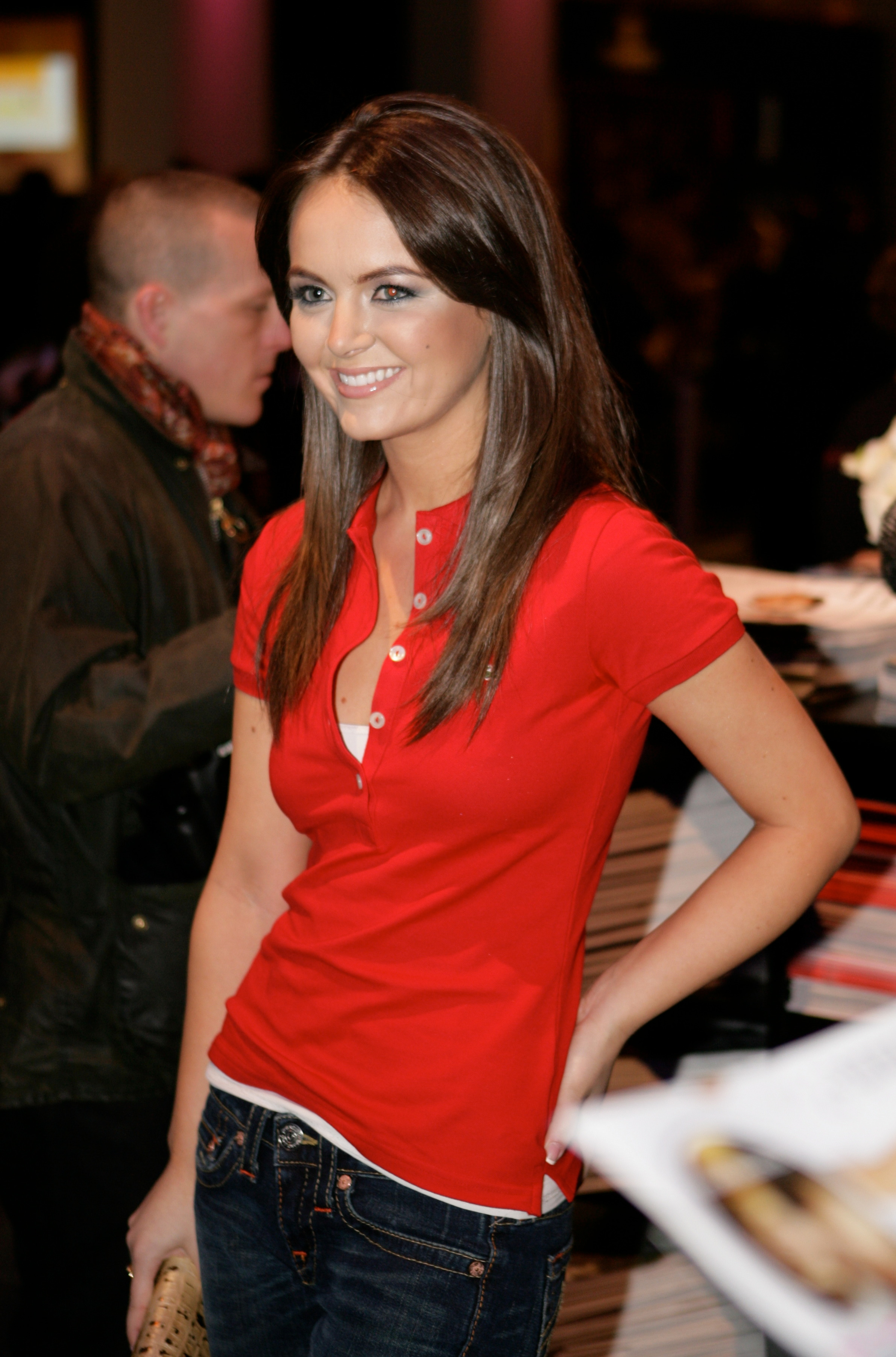
Nicole Lapin

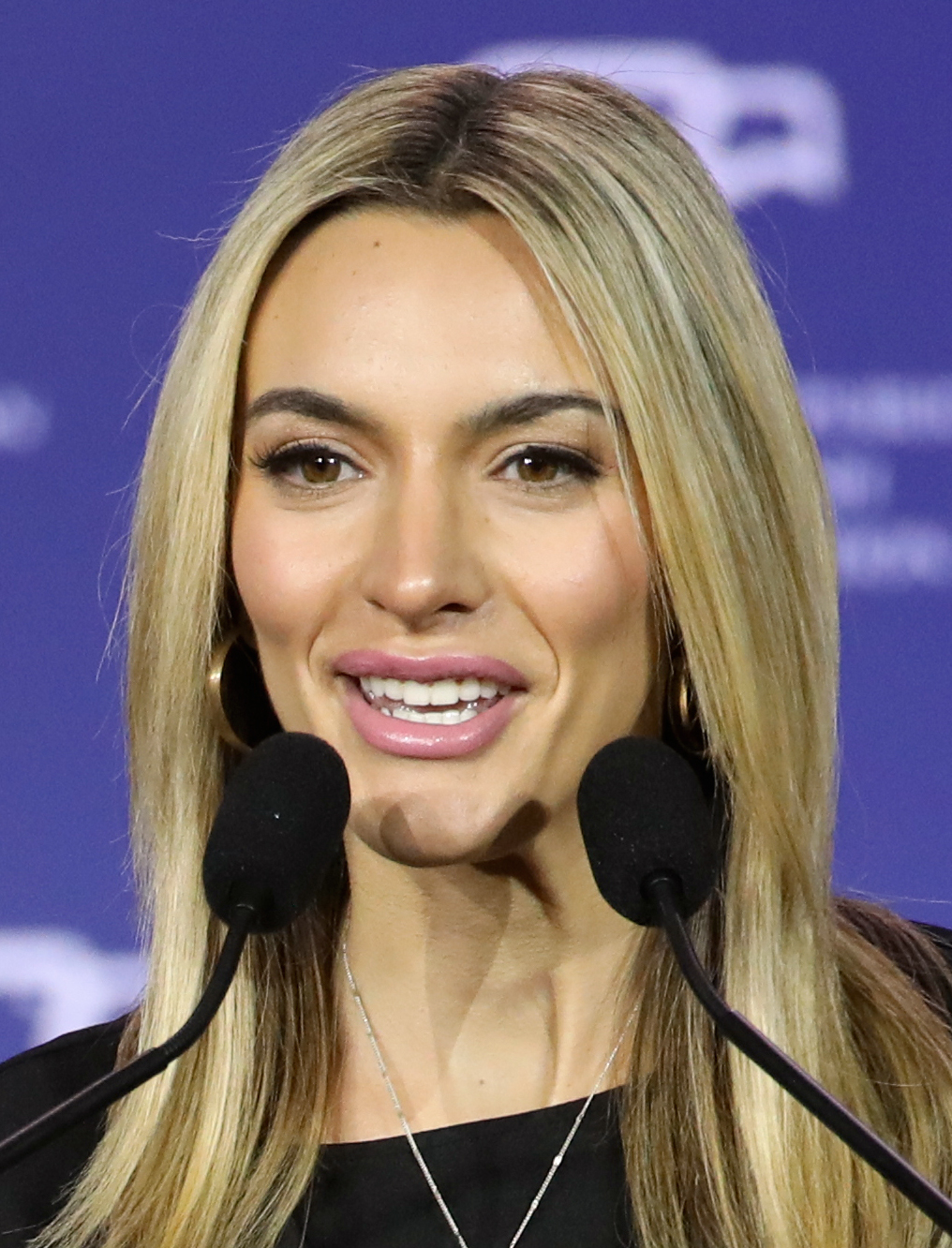
Emily Austin

- Emily Austin, sports journalist
- Irin Carmon, feminist author, blogger, and television personality
- Michael Dorfman, Russian-Israeli essayist and human rights activist
- Hadas Gold, politics, media and global business reporter for CNN
- Daniel Pearl, journalist and South Asia Bureau Chief of the Wall Street Journal, who was kidnapped and murdered in Pakistan.
- Nicole Lapin, anchor on CNBC and CNN Live
- Liel Leibovitz, journalist, author, media critic and video game scholar
- Haviv Rettig Gur, journalist at The Times of Israel, Former Director of Communications for the Jewish Agency
- Hanna Rosin, journalist

== Literature ==
- Nick Simmons, comic book writer, musician, and voice over actor
- Leora Skolkin-Smith, novelist (Edges: O Israel, O Palestine)
- Ayelet Waldman, novelist and essayist
- Leigh Bardugo, fantasy author of Six of Crows, Shadow and Bone, and Ninth House

== Musicians ==
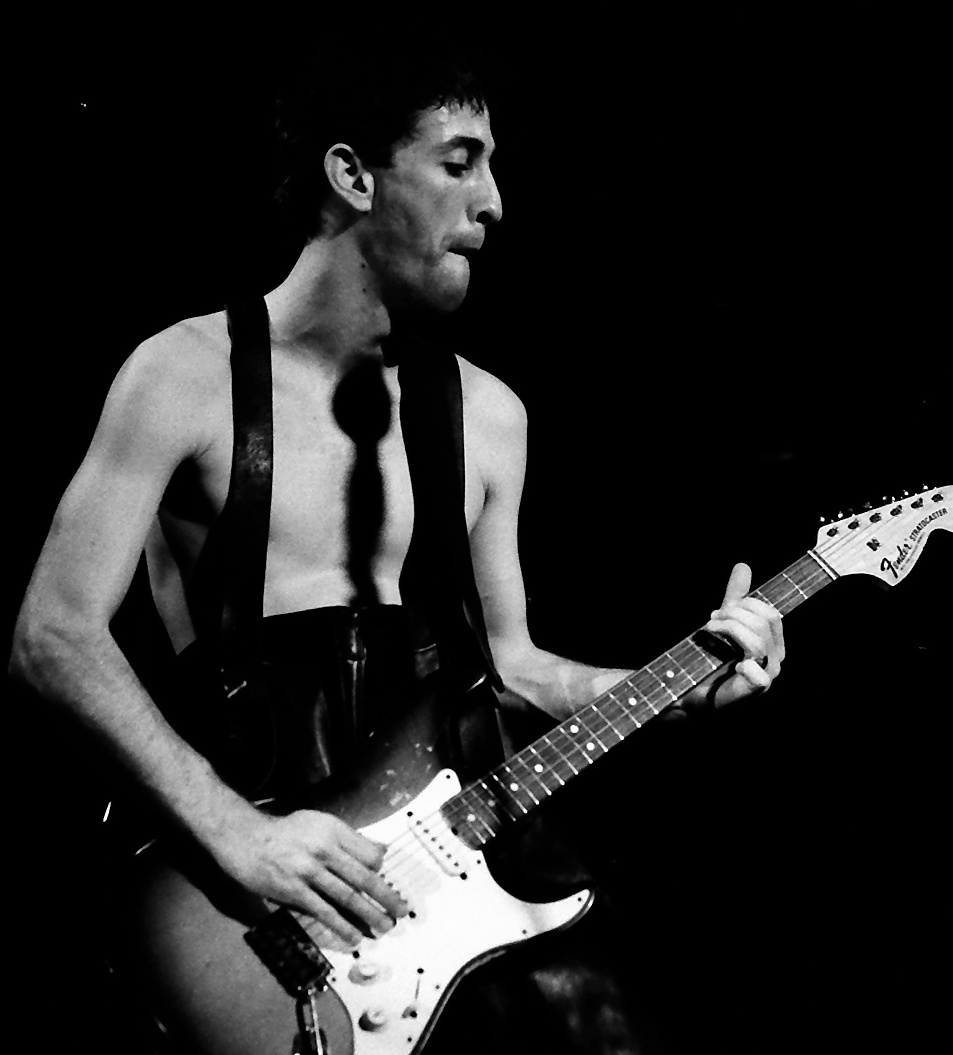
Hillel Slovak

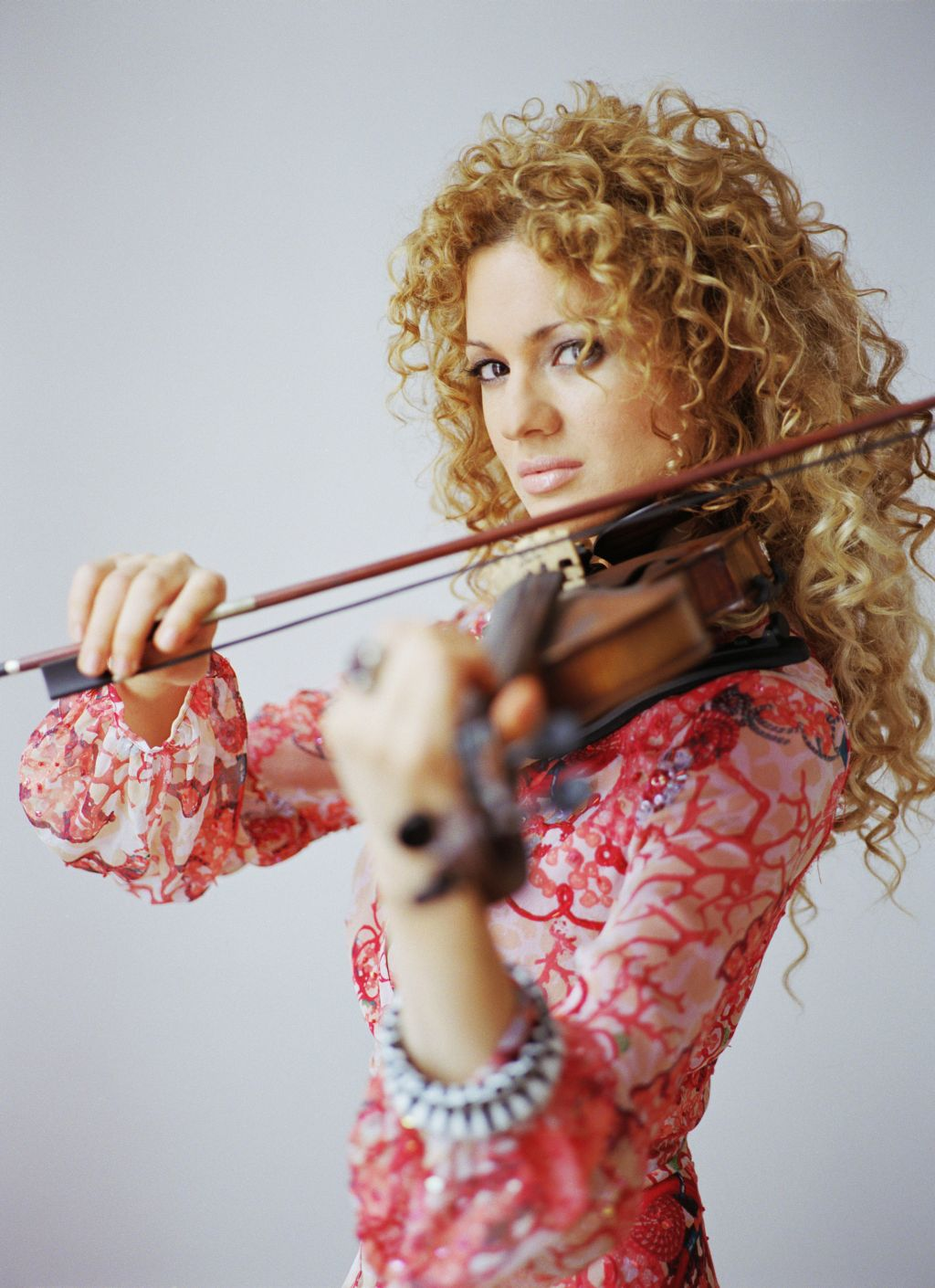
Miri Ben-Ari

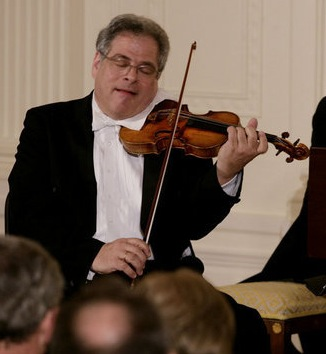
Itzhak Perlman

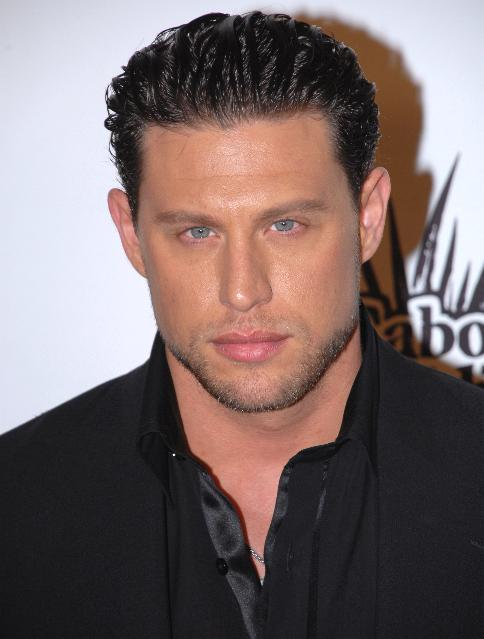
JR Rotem

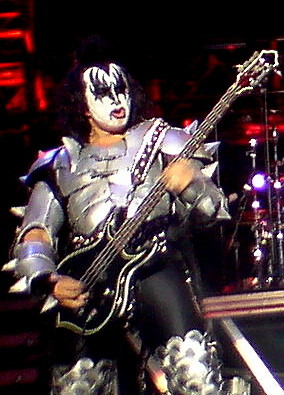
Gene Simmons

- The Alchemist, hip hop producer and rapper
- Leigh Daniel Avidan, member of Ninja Sex Party and co-host of Internet webseries Game Grumps.
- Carmit Bachar, member of the pop group, The Pussycat Dolls
- Didi Benami, American singer who is best known for being a finalist on the ninth season of American Idol. Daughter of an Israeli Jewish father.
- Ofer Ben-Amots, Israeli-American composer and professor of composition at Colorado College.
- Miri Ben-Ari, hip-hop violinist plays songs with emcee Twista and R&B singer Alicia Keys
- Ill Bill, rapper
- Yefim Bronfman, Soviet-born Israeli-American pianist
- Kosha Dillz, hip hop MC
- David Draiman, lead vocalist for heavy metal band Disturbed
- Eli Eban, clarinetist
- Meir Finkelstein, cantor and composer of contemporary Jewish liturgical music
- Yuval Gabay, hip hop drummer
- Goapele, African-American soul and R&B singer-songwriter, daughter of a New York-born Israeli Jewish mother
- Este, Danielle and Alana Haim, Grammy-nominated musicians of the rock band HAIM.
- Yehuda Hanani, international soloist, recording artist, cellist, and Professor of Violoncello at the University of Cincinnati College-Conservatory of Music
- Eyran Katsenelenbogen, jazz pianist
- Joseph Malovany, tenor soloist, cantor of New York's Fifth Avenue Synagogue, and Distinguished Professor of Liturgical Music at Philip and Sarah Belz School of Jewish Music, Yeshiva University
- Necro, rapper, producer, director, and record label owner; younger brother of Ill Bill
- Itzhak Perlman, violin virtuoso
- Shulamit Ran, composer, won the Pulitzer Prize
- J.R. Rotem, record producer and songwriter
- Gil Shaham, Israeli American award-winning violinist
- Mordecai Shehori, pianist
- Itaal Shur, composer, producer, and musician
- Gene Simmons, guitarist and singer-songwriter from Kiss, Israeli-born
- Hillel Slovak, original guitarist of the band Red Hot Chili Peppers, Israeli-born
- Emanuel Vardi, violist
- Elliott Yamin, American singer, third place finalist on the fifth season of American Idol
- Inon Zur, Israeli American award-winning music composer
- Sean Hurwitz, musician and singer
- Israela Margalit, pianist and playwright
- Rucka Rucka Ali, rapper, singer, YouTuber and parodist

== Religion ==
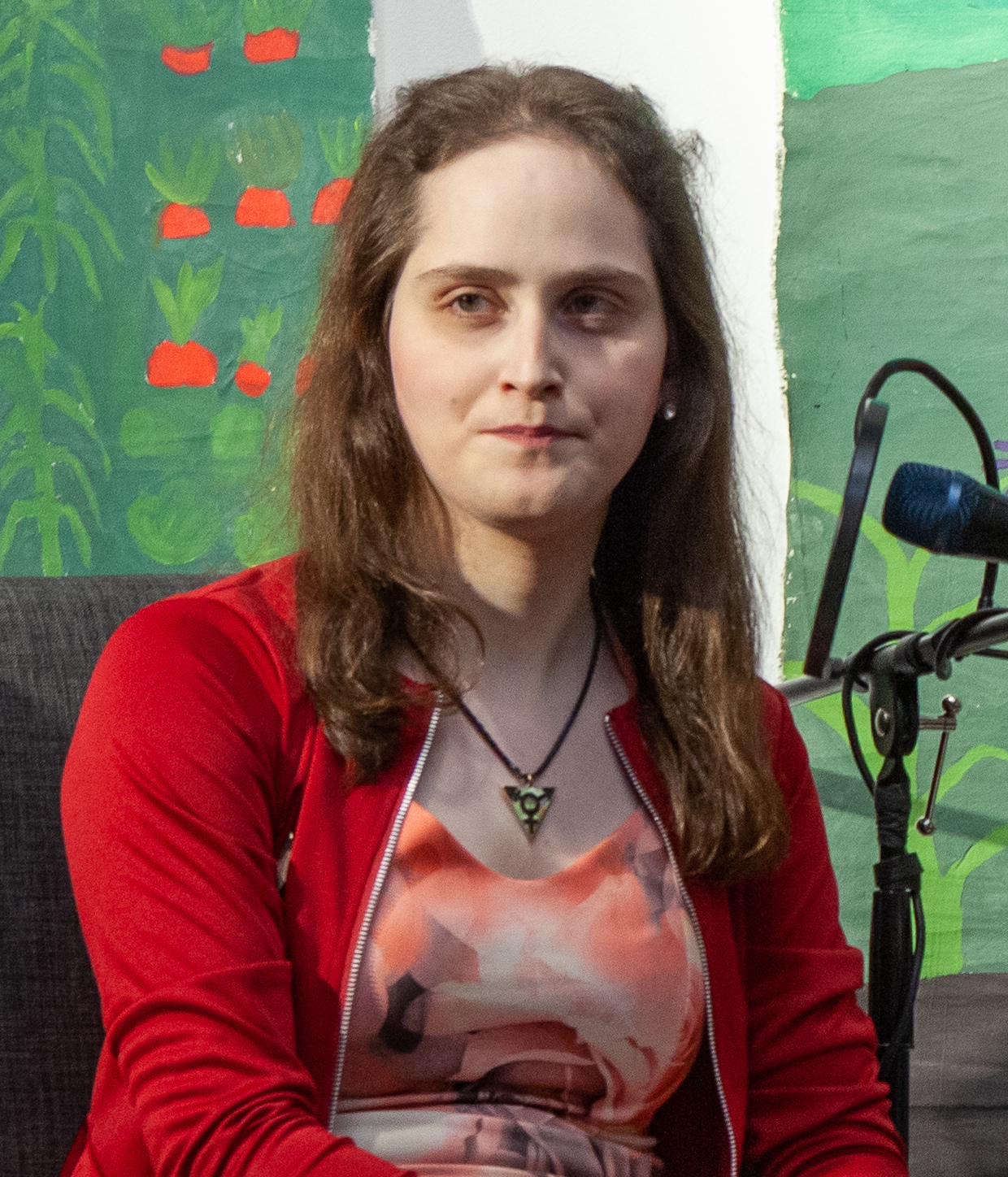
Abby Stein

- Eliyahu Ben Haim (born 1940), Orthodox rabbi and Av Beth Din (religious judge)
- Yitzhak Israeli, Orthodox rabbi
- Yosef Mizrachi, Orthodox Judaism outreach rabbi
- Abby Stein, formerly Hasidic Transgender rabbi and activist.

== Sports ==
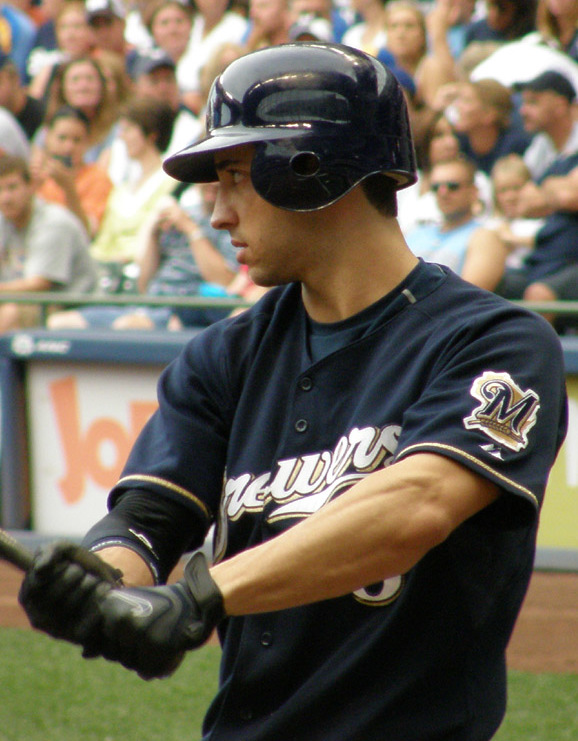
Ryan Braun

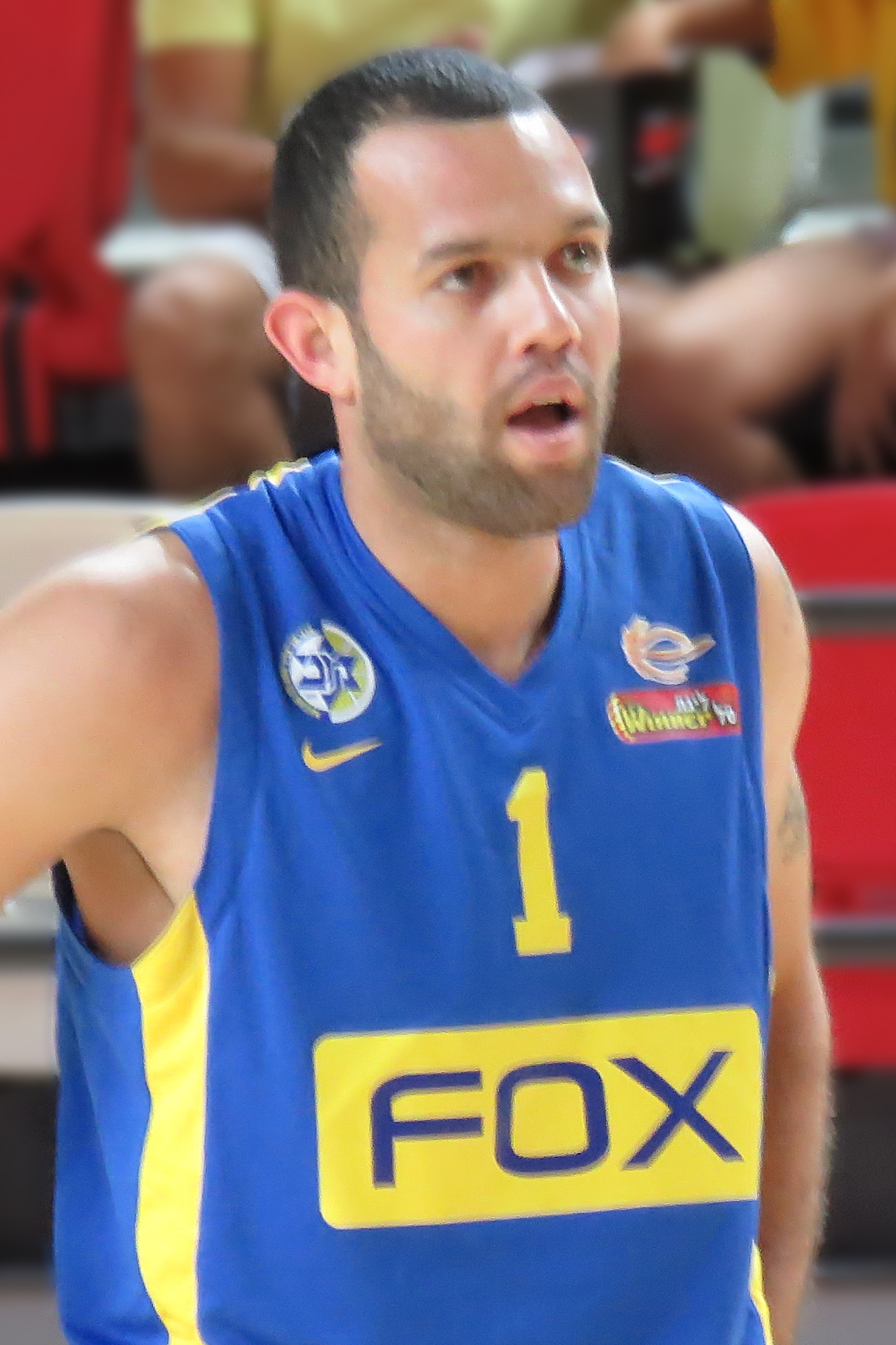
Jordan Farmar

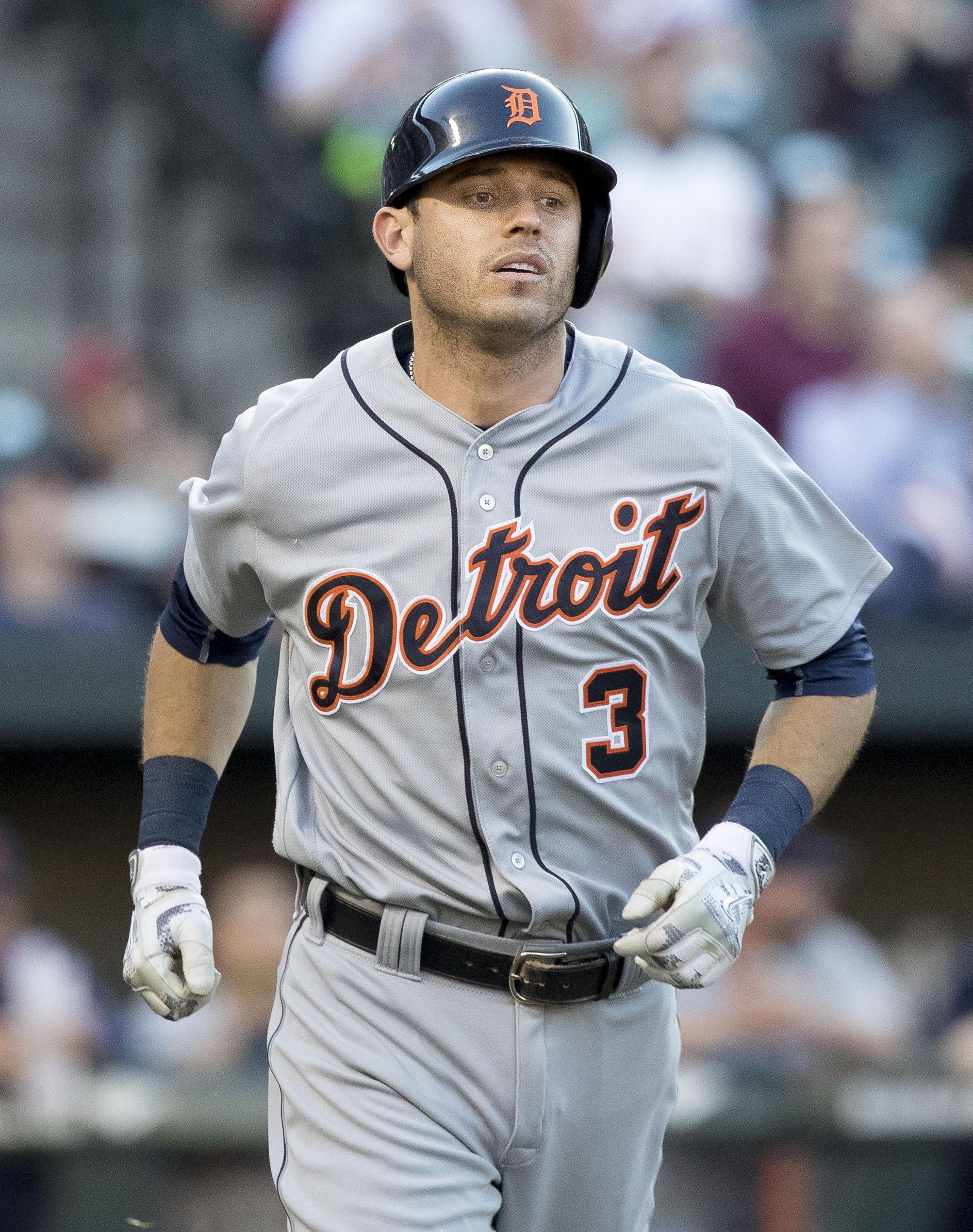
Ian Kinsler

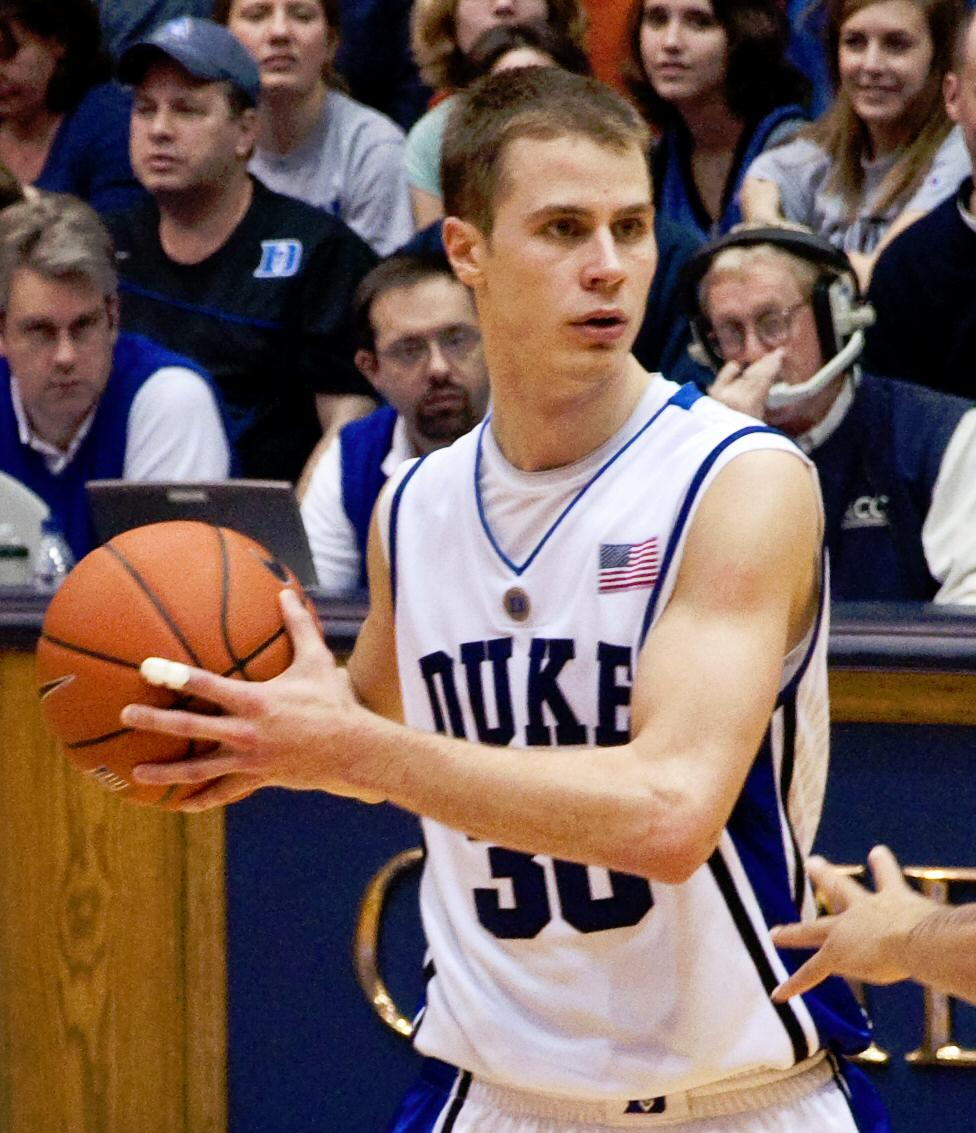
Jon Scheyer

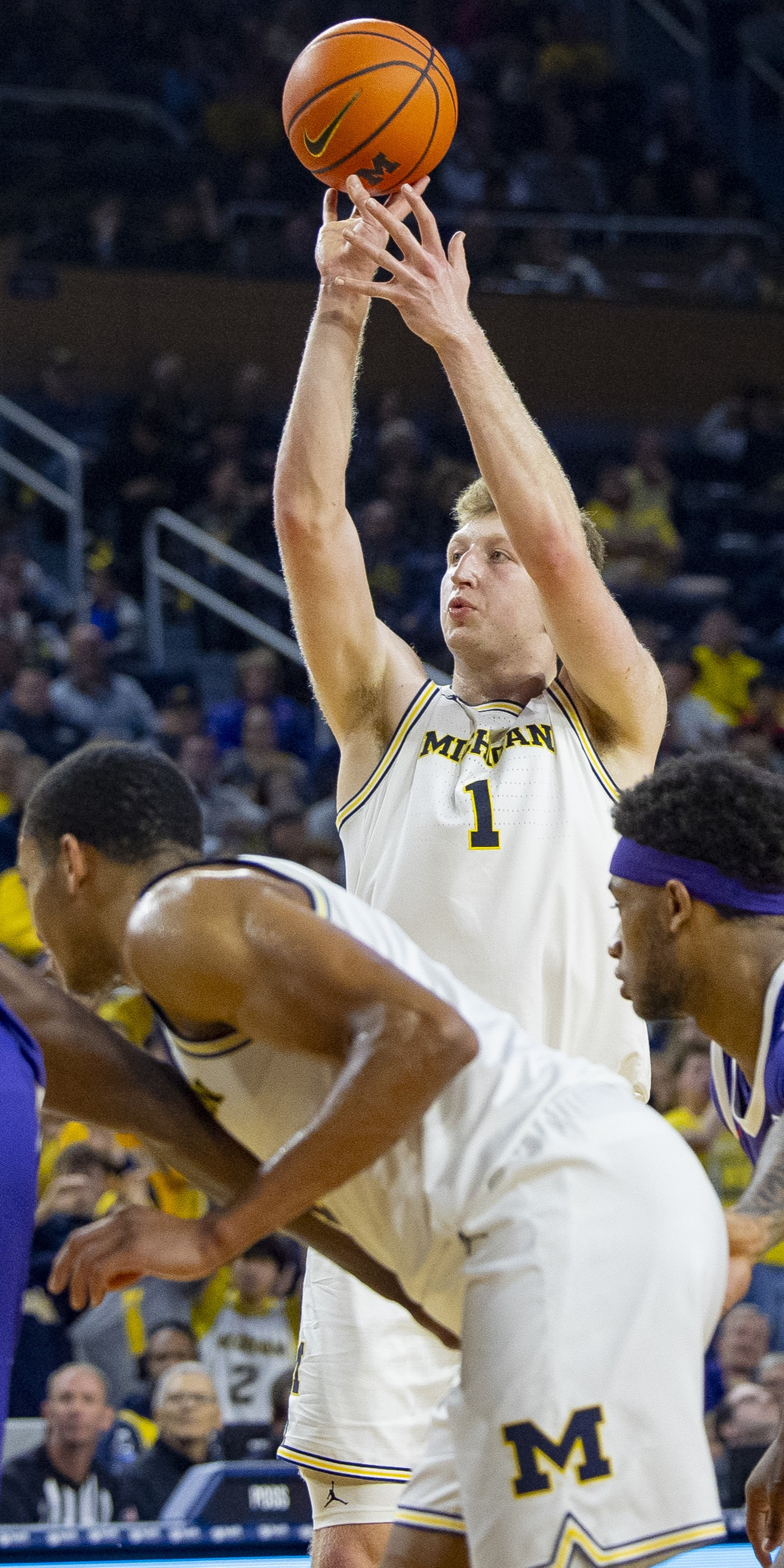
Danny Wolf

- Ike Berger (1936–2022), Olympic and world champion weightlifter
- Sue Bird (born 1980), point guard for the Seattle Storm; first overall pick in the 2002 WNBA draft; two-time Olympic champion; four-time All-Star
- Adam Bisnowaty (born 1993), football player for the New York Giants of the NFL
- David Blatt (born 1959), Head Coach of the Cleveland Cavaliers, NBA franchise
- David Blu (born 1980), professional basketball player for Maccabi Tel Aviv
- Ryan Braun (born 1983), major league baseball player
- Tal Brody (born 1943), professional basketball player for Maccabi Tel Aviv
- Jake Cohen (born 1990), professional basketball player for Maccabi Tel Aviv and the Israeli national basketball team
- John DiBartolomeo (born 1991), professional basketball player for Israeli powerhouse Maccabi Tel Aviv
- Eva Fabian (born 1993), world champion swimmer
- Jordan Farmar (born 1986), basketball player for the Sacramento Kings
- Roy Fink (born 1977), retired soccer player and coach
- D'or Fischer (born 1981), professional basketball player
- Mordechai Haim (born 1954), soccer player
- Ian Kinsler (born 1982), major league baseball player
- Dean Kremer (born 1996), baseball pitcher for the Baltimore Orioles
- Sylven Landesberg (born 1990), basketball player for Maccabi Tel Aviv
- Barry Leibowitz (born 1945), basketball player in the American Basketball Association and the Israeli Basketball Premier League
- Brad Leaf (born 1960), professional basketball player
- T. J. Leaf (born 1997), NBA player for the Indiana Pacers
- Ben Lederman (born 2000), American-Israeli-Polish soccer player
- Boyd "Rainmaker" Melson (born 1981), light middleweight boxer
- Matt Mervis (born 1998), baseball first baseman in the Washington Nationals organization
- Jeron Roberts (born 1976), basketball player for the Israeli national team
- Kenny Hasan Sayef (born 1993), soccer player for Belgian club K.A.A. Gent
- Jon Scheyer (born 1987), professional basketball player and college coach
- Derrick Sharp (born 1971), basketball player
- Emanuel Sharp (born 2004), basketball player
- Alana Shipp (born 1982), IFBB professional bodybuilder
- Eliot Teltscher (born 1959), professional top-10 tennis player
- Alex Tyus (born 1988), professional basketball player
- Danny Wolf (born 2004), NBA player for the Brooklyn Nets
- Alex Zahavi (born 1991), soccer player
- Daria Zuravicki (born 1985), figure skater
- Jon_Dalzell (born 1960), professional basketball player

== Other ==
- Nava Applebaum, 20-year-old woman killed together with her father Dr. David Applebaum on the evening before her wedding by a Palestinian suicide bomber
- Doron Merdinger
- Michael Arad, architect who won the design competition for the World Trade Center Memorial in New York City in 2004
- Juval Aviv, security consultant and writer
- Ron Ben-Israel, pastry chef
- Ronnie Bardah, poker player and Survivor: Island of the Idols contestant
- Carol Shaya Castro, former New York City police officer and actress whose employment was terminated after she appeared in Playboy magazine
- Eli Elezra, world-class poker player
- Tamar Geller, dog trainer who developed "the Loved Dog" method of dog training
- Chaim Gingold, noted for design work with the computer game Spore
- Gavriel Holtzberg, Orthodox rabbi and Chabad emissary to Mumbai, India, killed by Pakistani Islamist militants in the 2008 Mumbai attacks
- Ami James, tattoo artist, businessman, and media personality (Miami Ink)
- Yonatan Netanyahu, Israeli war hero who died saving Jewish hostages in Operation Entebbe, older brother of Israeli prime minister Benjamin Netanyahu
- Cheryl Saban, philanthropist, woman's advocate, and wife of billionaire entertainment mogul Haim Saban
- Michael Solomonov, chef and restaurateur

== See also ==
- Israelis
- List of notable Israelis
- Lists of American Jews
- Israeli diaspora
- Yerida
- Middle Eastern Americans
