= Leora =

Leora (Hebrew: ליאורה) is a Hebrew female given name. Alternative spellings may be Liora or Liorah. A male variant is Leor. The name Leora may refer to:

== Leora ==
- Leora Auslander (born 1959), American historian
- Leora Batnitzky
- Leora Bettison Robinson (1840–1914), American author, educator
- Leora Bilsky
- Leora Dana (1923–1983), American actress
- Leora Jones
- Leora Klapper
- Leora Kornfeld
- Leora Levy
- Leora Skolkin-Smith (born 1952), American novelist
- Leora Spellman (1890–1945), American actress
- Leora T. Hughes, the namesake of the Leora's stream salamander
- Leora Tanenbaum, American feminist author and editor
- Leora Thatcher
- Pamela Leora Spratlen

== Liora ==
- Liora (singer) (Liora Simon Fadlon) (born 1970), Israeli singer, represented Israel in the Eurovision Song Contest 1995
- Liora Itzhak (born 1974), Israeli singer
- Liora Ofer (born 1953), Israeli businesswoman
- Liora Rez of StopAntisemitism
- Liora Rivlin (born 1944), Israeli actress

== See also ==
- Leora, Missouri
