= Tannenbaum (surname) =

Tannenbaum, Tanenbaum, Tenenbaum, Tenenbom or Tennenbaum (Hebrew: טננבאום, טננבוים) is an Ashkenazi surname with the meaning "fir tree" or more specific "Christmas tree". Notable people with the surname include:

== Tannenbaum ==
- Abner Tannenbaum (1848–1913), Russian-American Yiddish journalist and writer
- Albert Tannenbaum (1906–1976), American gangster
- Allen Tannenbaum (born 1953), American/Israeli mathematician
- Barry Tannenbaum, (born 1966) South African businessman
- Benjamin Tannenbaum (1906–1941), New York mobster
- Elhanan Tannenbaum, (born 1946) former captive Israeli officer and shady businessman
- Emmanuel David Tannenbaum (1978–2012), Israeli/American biophysicist
- Frank Tannenbaum (1893–1969), American sociologist
- Judith Tannenbaum (born 1947), American teaching artist and writer
- Leonard M. Tannenbaum (born 1971), American investor
- Micah Tannenbaum, podcaster on MuggleCast
- Mike Tannenbaum (born 1969), professional American football executive
- Rina Tannenbaum (born 1953), Israeli/American chemist
- Samuel A. Tannenbaum (1874–1948), early-20th-century literary scholar, bibliographer, and palaeographer
- Wolf Tannenbaum (1787–1873), a rabbi in Verpelét; see History of the Jews in Verpelét § 19th century

== Tanenbaum ==
- Andrew S. Tanenbaum (born 1944), American-Dutch computer scientist
- David Tanenbaum (guitarist) (born 1956), American classical guitarist
- Israel Tanenbaum (born 1961), Puerto Rican pianist, record producer, composer, arranger and audio engineer
- Larry Tanenbaum (born 1945), Canadian businessman
- Marc H. Tanenbaum (1925–1992), American rabbi
- Robert K. Tanenbaum, author of crime novels
- Sid Tanenbaum (1925–1986), American basketball player

== Tenenbaum ==
- Brigid Tenenbaum, a fictional character in the video game series BioShock
- Edward A. Tenenbaum, American economist
- Ehud Tenenbaum (born 1979), Israeli hacker
- Eugenia Tenenbaum (born 1996), Spanish art historian, feminist and LGBTQ rights activist
- Gérald Tenenbaum (born 1952), French mathematician and novelist
- Inez Tenenbaum (born 1951), American politician
- Jay Martin Tenenbaum, American computer scientist and Internet commerce pioneer
- Jean Ferrat (born Jean Tenenbaum), French singer
- Joshua Tenenbaum, American cognitive scientist
- Manuel Tenenbaum (1934–2016), Uruguayan educator, historian and philanthropist
- Mica Tenenbaum (born 1995), Argentine-American musician
- Sergio Tenenbaum (born 1964), Canadian philosopher
- Stephen Tenenbaum, American movie producer

== Tenenbom ==
- Tuvia Tenenbom (born 1957), American writer and theater director

== Tennenbaum ==
- Jonathan Tennenbaum (born 1979), Argentine-Israeli footballer
- Stanley Tennenbaum (1927/28 – 2006), American mathematician
