= Allen Tannenbaum =

American mathematician (1953–2023)

Allen Robert Tannenbaum
- Born: January 25, 1953; New York City
- Died: December 28, 2023 (aged 70)
- Education: Harvard University
- Spouse: Rina Tannenbaum
- Scientific career
- Fields: applied mathematics control theory medical image analysis network analysis systems biology
- Doctoral advisor: Heisuke Hironaka
- Doctoral students: Guillermo Sapiro

Allen Robert Tannenbaum (January 25, 1953 – December 28, 2023) was an American applied mathematician who finished his career as a Distinguished Professor in the Departments of Computer Science and Applied Mathematics & Statistics at the State University of New York at Stony Brook.

Tannenbaum's research covered numerous areas, including robust control, computer vision, biomedical imaging, and bioinformatics, totaling almost 500 publications.

== Research ==
He pioneered the field of robust control with the solution of the gain margin and phase margin problems using techniques from Nevanlinna–Pick interpolation theory, which was the first H-infinity type control problem solved. Tannenbaum used techniques from elliptic curves to show that the reachability does not imply pole assignability for systems defined over polynomial rings in two or more variables over an arbitrary field. He pioneered the use of partial differential equations in computer vision and biomedical imaging co-inventing with Guillermo Sapiro an affine-invariant heat equation for image enhancement. He pioneered the application of Earth Mover's Distance from Optimal Mass Transport (OMT) theory and related metrics to image analysis problems and network data, including cancer systems biology, and has published numerous seminal works in this area. Tannenbaum further formulated a new approach to optimal mass transport (Monge-Kantorovich) theory in joint work with Steven Haker and Sigurd Angenent. Tannenbaum formulated an unbalanced version of OMT that has been used to understand the flows of the glymphatic system. In recent work, he developed techniques using graph curvature ideas for analyzing the robustness of complex networks, with many applications to cancer genomic analysis.

He gave numerous plenary talks at major conferences including the Society for Industrial and Applied Mathematics (SIAM) Conference on Control in 1998, IEEE Conference on Decision and Control of the IEEE Control Systems Society in 2000, and the International Symposium on the Mathematical Theory of Networks and Systems (MTNS) in 2012. He is also well known as one of the authors of the textbook Feedback Control Theory (with John Doyle and Bruce Francis), which is currently a standard introduction to robust control at the graduate level.

== Education and career ==
Tannenbaum majored in mathematics at Columbia University, graduating in 1973. He completed a doctorate at Harvard University three years later, in 1976. His doctoral dissertation, Deformations of I-Cycles and the Chow Scheme, was supervised by Heisuke Hironaka.

He became an assistant professor at the Weizmann Institute of Science in Israel from 1976 to 1978, and then held research positions at the Institut des Hautes Études Scientifiques in France, ETH Zurich in Switzerland, and the Weizmann Institute, from 1978 to 1983. While at the Weizmann Institute, he also became an associate professor at the University of Florida, from 1982 until 1984, when he moved to Ben-Gurion University. Continuing at Ben-Gurion University until 1986, he also held a visiting professorship at McGill University in Canada from 1985 to 1986.

In the next years he held overlapping longer-term full professorships, from 1986 to 2002 at the University of Minnesota, from 1989 to 1992 and 2005 to 2010 at the Technion – Israel Institute of Technology, and from 1999 to 2011 as Julian Hightower Professor of Electrical/Computer and Biomedical Engineering at Georgia Tech. After leaving Georgia Tech he became Bunn Professor of radiology at the University of Alabama before joining Stony Brook University as a professor of computer science and applied mathematics in 2013. Stony Brook named him as a distinguished professor in 2015.

== Awards ==
Tannenbaum was named as an IEEE Fellow in 2008. He was named as a 2023 International Federation of Automatic Control (IFAC) Fellow "for foundational contributions to robust control and computer vision".

== Personal life ==
Tannenbaum was born on January 25, 1953 in New York City. His wife Rina Tannenbaum is a chemist, and his son Emmanuel David Tannenbaum was a biophysicist and applied mathematician.

He died in December 2023.
