= Tannenbaum =

Tannenbaum, and variations, may refer to:

- The German term for fir tree
- Tannenbaum, Arkansas
- "O Tannenbaum", a Christmas carol of German origin
- Operation Tannenbaum, the planned invasion of neutral Switzerland by Nazi Germany
- Tanenbaum Center for Interreligious Understanding (or simply Tanenbaum), a New York–based non-profit organization
- Sony BMG v. Tenenbaum, 2003 court case in the U.S. District Court for the District of Massachusetts
  - Sony BMG Music Entertainment v. Tenenbaum, 2011 court case in the U.S. Court of Appeals for the First Circuit; appeals lawsuit for the prior case
- Tannenbaum (surname)

== See also ==
- The Royal Tenenbaums, 2001 American comedy-drama film
- Tannenbaum Park, historic house in Greensboro, North Carolina, U.S.
