= Yitzhak Israeli =

Rabbi Yitzhak Israeli
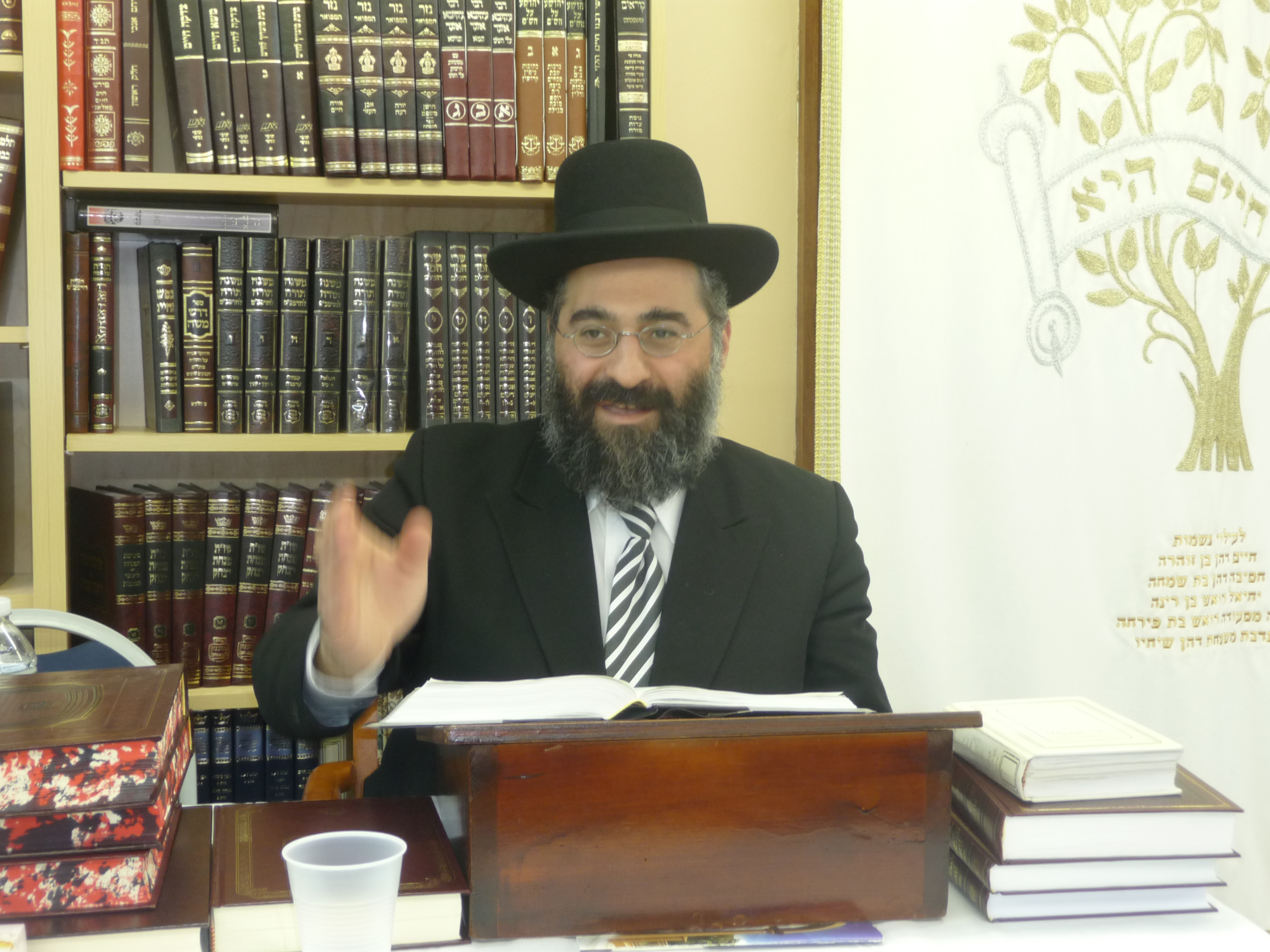

Personal life
- Born: Jerusalem
- Parent(s): Nuriel Israeli; Penina Israeli
- Education: Yeshivat Tifrach
- Occupation: Rabbi, Talmudic scholar, judge, dayan, lecturer, recognized halakhic authority

Religious life
- Religion: Judaism
- Denomination: Orthodox

Jewish leader
- Synagogue: Sephardic Center of Mill Basin
- Residence: Brooklyn, New York
- Semikhah: Eliyahu Ben Haim

Yitzhak Israeli (Hebrew: יצחק ישראלי; Yitzchak Yisraeli) is a Sephardi rabbi, Talmudic scholar, and Orthodox halakhist. He is the Av Beit Din of Torah U'Mishpat in Brooklyn, New York. He serves as the Rabbi of the Sephardic Center of Mill Basin, a predominantly Syrian Jewish congregation.

== Early life ==
Born in Jerusalem, Israeli studied at Yeshivat Tifrach. He was a prominent student of Ben Zion Abba Shaul and Ovadia Yosef. In 1998 he moved to New York, where he received his semikha (rabbinic ordination) from Eliyahu Ben Haim.

== Community work ==
Soon after he became a rabbi, Israeli began to serve as a dayan (rabbinic judge) in the beth din headed by Ben Haim in Queens. In 2000 he was appointed rabbi of Congregation Sha'are Emunah in Cedarhurst, where he served until 2009. From 2008 to 2010, Israeli served as a rosh yeshiva (dean) in Yeshivah Beer Yitzhak in Beitar Illit, West Bank.

In 2001, Israeli established the Sephardic Beth Medrash and Congregation of Rockland County in Wesley Hills, New York, which he led until 2012. In 2012 he was appointed rabbi of the Sephardic Center of Mill Basin. Israeli taught halakha (Jewish law) and dayanut in several kollelim (advanced institutes) in Brooklyn and Queens. He is Rosh Kollel (head of the kollel) in Congregation Beth Gavriel in Queens.

He established Be'er Yitzhak Foundation, an organization that helps the needy in Israel, as well as Jewish education organizations in Israel. He is among the rabbis leading the Bikur Cholim Website Of Mill Basin organization.

Israeli's theory of halakha is based upon the methods of Ovadia Yosef. His halakhic work deals with the most complicated issues in Even Ha'ezer, as well as other parts of the Shulchan Aruch.

Israeli has opposed assimilation in the Bukharian community. and works on transferring children from public schools to Jewish schools in Queens.

Israeli was among the speakers at the Agudath Israel of America 2018 convention. Bukharian community leaders in Israel invited him to honor the scholarship awarding event by the Bukharian Community in Israel in April 2022.

== Works ==
Israeli focuses on the issuing halakha rulings. Some of his early works were published in several issues of the halakhic journal Kol Me'heikhal. His rulings deal with all the four parts of Shulchan Aruch.

Israeli's first book, published in 2014 and titled MeAvnei HaMakom (Part 1), deals with several halakhic issues including contemporary Shabbat issues, marriage, gittin (divorce documents) and agunot. The book received accolades from Ben Haim and Zalman Nechemia Goldberg.

His second book, Yode'ei Binah, was published in 2016, and deals with the determination of zmanim (halakhic times of the day), and rulings that stem from those determinations.
