= Lior (name) =

Lior (Hebrew: ליאור) is a Jewish given name. It primarily means 'I have light', or 'my light'. A female variant is Leora (Liora, Hebrew: ליאורה). Notable people with the name include:

== Given name ==
- Lior Arditti (born 1977), Israeli basketball player
- Lior Ashkenazi, Israeli actor
- Lior Asulin, Israeli football player
- Lior Attar, Israeli-born Australian singer-songwriter
- Lior Ben-David, Israeli professional wrestler
- Lior Duvdevani (born 1979), Israeli comedian
- Lior Eliyahu (born 1985), Israeli basketball player
- Lior Jan, Israeli football (soccer) player
- Lior Lubin (born 1979), Israeli basketball player and coach
- Lior Mor (born 1976), Israeli tennis player
- Lior Narkis, Israeli singer who represented Israel in the Eurovision Song Contest 2003
- Lior Perlmutter, member of the Israeli Goa trance group Astral Projection
- Lior Rafaelov, Israeli football (soccer) player
- Lior Raz (born 1971), Israeli actor and screenwriter
- Lior Rosner, composer, primarily of the Power Rangers franchise
- Lior Schleien, Israeli satirist
- Lior Shamriz, German-Israeli film director
- Lior Suchard, Israeli mentalist

== Leor ==
- Leor Dimant (born 1972), Latvian-American musician
- Leor Weinberger (born 1977), Canadian-born American biologist

== Lyor ==
- Lyor Cohen (born 1959), American music industry executive

== Surname ==
- Dov Lior, Israeli Orthodox rabbi and political figure
- Haim Lior (1905–1989), Israeli statesman, Secretary of the Knesset (1968–1972)
- Gad Lior (born 1953), n Israeli economic journalist, the editor-in-chief of Yedioth Ahronoth
- Yisrael Lior (1921–1981), Israeli military commander, Military Secretary to the Prime Minister (1966–1974)

== See also ==
- Leor Energy, a natural gas company in Texas
- Leora
