= Immortal DNA strand hypothesis =

Hypothesis in biology

The immortal DNA strand hypothesis posits that adult stem cells replicate their DNA asymmetrically to minimize mutations in their genomes. It was proposed in 1975 by John Cairns as a mechanism that would benefit organisms by reducing cancer incidence. For decades, evidence for the hypothesis was sparse, contradictory and inconclusive.

Since the 2010s, evidence from a variety of species, including, mice, flies and humans, strongly suggests that DNA is randomly segregated in stem cells, thereby refuting the immortal strand hypothesis. Instead, multiple processes (xenobiotic metabolism, efflux, DNA repair and quiescence) are in place to minimize mutations, detrimental mutations are negatively selected and, in some cases, cells with driver mutations are kept in check by other cells by direct competition. Mechanisms such as these keep cancer rates low in humans, despite the fact that somatic mutagenesis is widespread and errors accumulate with age. In some stem cell compartments, such as the esophagus and hematopoietic stem cells, driver mutations are found in the majority of cells in older individuals.

== The immortal strand ==
According to Cairns, adult stem cells could divide their DNA asymmetrically, instead of segregating their DNA during mitosis in a random manner. In this manner, stem cells would retain a distinct template set of DNA strands (parental strands) in each division. By retaining the same set of template DNA strands, adult stem cells would pass mutations arising from errors in DNA replication on to non-stem cell daughters that soon terminally differentiate (end mitotic divisions and become a functional cell). Passing on these replication errors would allow adult stem cells to reduce their rate of accumulation of mutations that could lead to serious genetic disorders such as cancer.

After Cairns first proposed the immortal DNA strand mechanism, the theory has undergone several updated refinements. In 2002, he proposed that in addition to using immortal DNA strand mechanisms to segregate DNA, when the immortal DNA strands of adult stem cells undergo damage, they will choose to die (apoptose) rather than use DNA repair mechanisms that are normally used in non-stem cells.

Emmanuel David Tannenbaum and James Sherley developed a quantitative model describing how repair of point mutations might differ in adult stem cells. They found that in adult stem cells, repair was most efficient if they used an immortal DNA strand mechanism for segregating DNA, rather than a random segregation mechanism. This method would be beneficial because it avoids wrongly fixing DNA mutations in both DNA strands and propagating the mutation.

The complete proof of a concept generally requires a plausible mechanism that could mediate the effect. Although controversial, there is a suggestion that this could be provided by the dynein motor. This paper is accompanied by a comment summarizing the findings and background. However, this work has highly respected biologists among its detractors as exemplified by a further comment on a paper by the same authors from 2006. The authors have rebutted the criticism.

== Testing the hypothesis ==
Prior to the development of technologies such as next-generation sequencing, advanced lineage tracing and mass spectrometry imaging, two main assays were used to detect immortal DNA strand segregation: label-retention and label-release pulse/chase assays.

In the label-retention assay, the goal is to mark 'immortal' or parental DNA strands with a DNA label such as tritiated thymidine or bromodeoxyuridine (BrdU). These types of DNA labels will incorporate into the newly synthesized DNA of dividing cells during S phase. A pulse of DNA label is given to adult stem cells under conditions where they have not yet delineated an immortal DNA strand. During these conditions, the adult stem cells are either dividing symmetrically (thus with each division a new 'immortal' strand is determined and in at least one of the stem cells the immortal DNA strand will be marked with DNA label), or the adult stem cells have not yet been determined (thus their precursors are dividing symmetrically, and once they differentiate into adult stem cells and choose an 'immortal' strand, the 'immortal strand' will already have been marked). Experimentally, adult stem cells are undergoing symmetric divisions during growth and after wound healing, and are not yet determined at neonatal stages. Once the immortal DNA strand is labelled and the adult stem cell has begun or resumed asymmetric divisions, the DNA label is chased out. In symmetric divisions (most mitotic cells), DNA is segregating randomly and the DNA label will be diluted out to levels below detection after five divisions. If, however, cells are using an immortal DNA strand mechanism, then all the labeled DNA will continue to co-segregate with the adult stem cell, and after five (or more) divisions will still be detected within the adult stem cell. These cells are sometimes called label-retaining cells (LRCs).

In the label-release assay, the goal is to mark the newly synthesized DNA that is normally passed on to the daughter (non-stem) cell. A pulse of DNA label is given to adult stem cells under conditions where they are dividing asymmetrically. Under conditions of homeostasis, adult stem cells should be dividing asymmetrically so that the same number of adult stem cells is maintained in the tissue compartment. After pulsing for long enough to label all the newly replicated DNA, the DNA label is chased out (each DNA replication now incorporates unlabeled nucleotides) and the adult stem cells are assayed for loss of the DNA label after two cell divisions. If cells are using a random segregation mechanism, then enough DNA label should remain in the cell to be detected. If, however, the adult stem cells are using an immortal DNA strand mechanism, they are obligated to retain the unlabeled 'immortal' DNA, and will release all the newly synthesized labeled DNA to their differentiating daughter cells in two divisions.

Some scientists have combined the two approaches, by first using one DNA label to label the immortal strands, allowing to adult stem cells to begin dividing asymmetrically, and then using a different DNA label to label the newly synthesized DNA. Thus, the adult stem cells will retain one DNA label and release the other within two divisions.

== Early evidence ==
One of the earliest studies by Karl Lark et al. demonstrated co-segregation of DNA in the cells of plant root tips. Plant root tips labeled with tritiated thymidine tended to segregate their labeled DNA to the same daughter cell. Though not all the labeled DNA segregated to the same daughter, the amount of thymidine-labeled DNA seen in the daughter with less label corresponded to the amount that would have arisen from sister-chromatid exchange. Later studies by Christopher Potten et al. (2002), using pulse/chase experiments with tritiated thymidine, found long-term label-retaining cells in the small intestinal crypts of neonatal mice. These researchers hypothesized that long-term incorporation of tritiated thymidine occurred because neonatal mice have undeveloped small intestines, and that pulsing tritiated thymidine soon after the birth of the mice allowed the 'immortal' DNA of adult stem cells to be labeled during their formation. These long-term cells were demonstrated to be actively cycling, as demonstrated by incorporation and release of BrdU.

Since these cells were cycling but continued to contain the BrdU label in their DNA, the researchers reasoned that they must be segregating their DNA using an immortal DNA strand mechanism. Joshua Merok et al. from the lab of James Sherley engineered mammalian cells with an inducible p53 gene that controls asymmetric divisions. BrdU pulse/chase experiments with these cells demonstrated that chromosomes segregated non-randomly only when the cells were induced to divide asymmetrically like adult stem cells. These asymmetrically dividing cells provide an in vitro model for demonstration and investigation of immortal strand mechanisms.

Scientists have strived to demonstrate that this immortal DNA strand mechanism exists in vivo in other types of adult stem cells. In 1996 Nik Zeps published the first paper demonstrating label retaining cells were present in the mouse mammary gland and this was confirmed in 2005 by Gilbert Smith who also published evidence that a subset of mouse mammary epithelial cells could retain DNA label and release DNA label in a manner consistent with the immortal DNA strand mechanism. Soon after, scientists from the laboratory of Derek van der Kooy showed that mice have neural stem cells that are BrdU-retaining and continue to be mitotically active. Asymmetric segregation of DNA was shown using real-time imaging of cells in culture. In 2006, scientists in the lab of Shahragim Tajbakhsh presented evidence that muscle satellite cells, which are proposed to be adult stem cells of the skeletal muscle compartment, exhibited asymmetric segregation of BrdU-labelled DNA when put into culture. They also had evidence that demonstrated BrdU release kinetics consistent with an immortal DNA strand mechanism were operating in vivo, using juvenile mice and mice with muscle regeneration induced by freezing.

These experiments supporting the immortal strand hypothesis, however, are not conclusive. While the Lark experiments demonstrated co-segregation, the co-segregation may have been an artifact of radiation from the tritium. Although Potten identified the cycling, label-retaining cells as adult stem cells, these cells are difficult to identify unequivocally as adult stem cells. While the engineered cells provide an elegant model for co-segregation of chromosomes, studies with these cells were done in vitro with engineered cells. Some features may not be present in vivo or may be absent in vitro. In May 2007 evidence in support of the Immortal DNA Strand theory was discovered by Michael Conboy et al., using the muscle stem/satellite cell model during tissue regeneration, where there is tremendous cell division during a relatively brief period of time. Using two BrdU analogs to label template and newly synthesized DNA strands, they saw that about half of the dividing cells in regenerating muscle sort the older "Immortal" DNA to one daughter cell and the younger DNA to the other. In keeping with the stem cell hypothesis, the more undifferentiated daughter typically inherited the chromatids with the older DNA, while the more differentiated daughter inherited the younger DNA.

Early experimental evidence against the immortal strand hypothesis was similarly sparse, limited by the techniques of the time. In one study, researchers incorporated tritiated thymidine into dividing murine epidermal basal cells. They followed the release of tritiated thymidine after various chase periods, but the pattern of release was not consistent with the immortal strand hypothesis. Although they found label-retaining cells, they were not within the putative stem cell compartment. With increasing lengths of time for the chase periods, these label-retaining cells were located farther from the putative stem cell compartment, suggesting that the label-retaining cells had moved. DNA template strand segregation was studied in the developing zebrafish. During larval development there was rapid depletion of older DNA template strands from stem cell niches in the retina, brain and intestine. Using high resolution microscopy, no evidence of asymmetric template strand segregation (in over 100 cell pairs) was found, making it improbable that in developing zebrafish asymmetric DNA segregation avoids mutational burden as proposed by the immortal strand hypothesis.

== See also ==
- Telomere
