= Lior Ron =

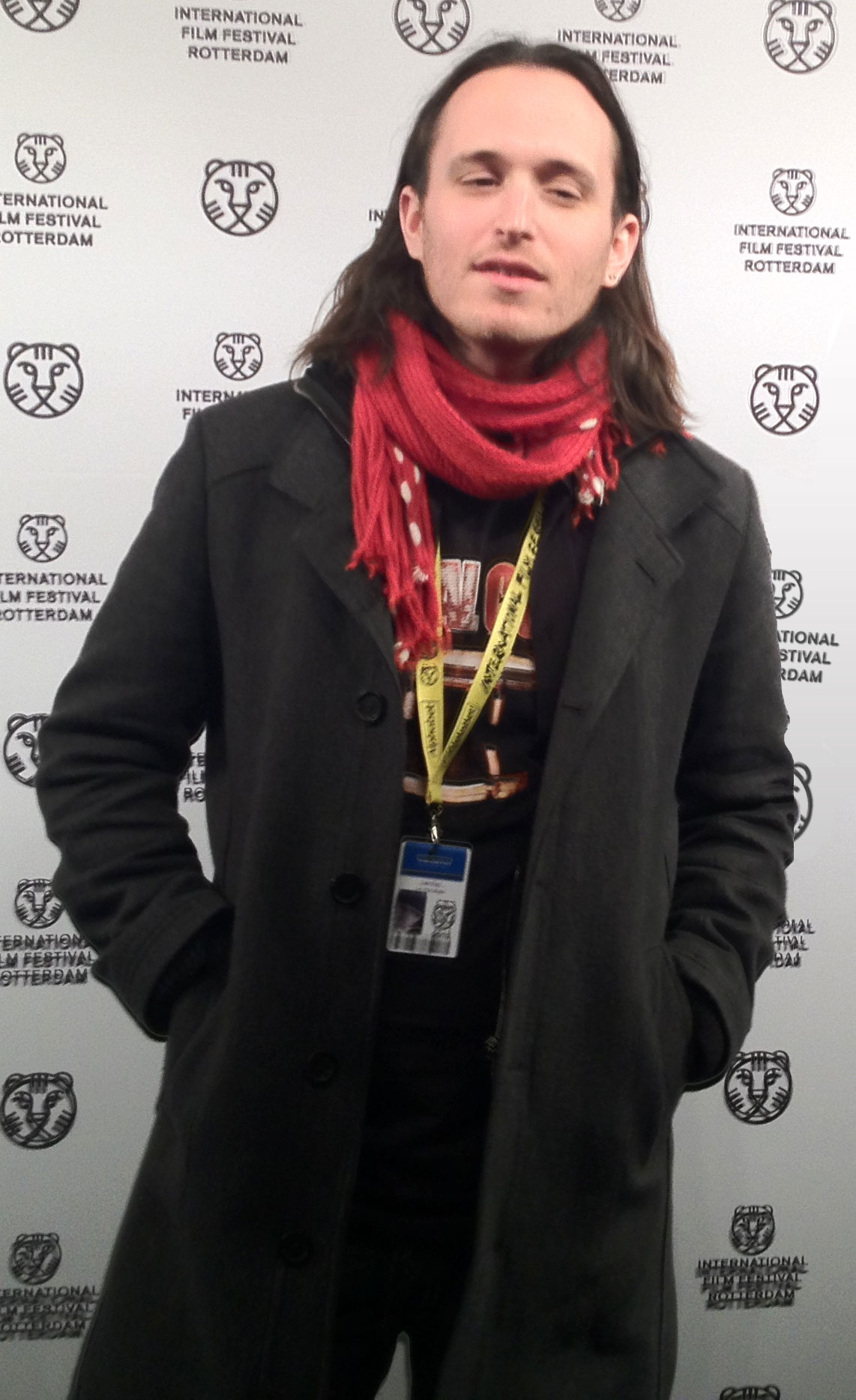
- Ron at the International Film Festival Rotterdam 2012.

Background information
- Birth name: Lior Ron
- Born: December 12, 1982 (age 42), Tel Aviv, Israel
- Genres: Orchestral, industrial, soundtrack
- Occupation(s): Entrepreneur, Composer
- Years active: 2000–present
- Website: http://www.Lioron.com

Lior Ron (born December 12, 1982) is an Israeli–American entrepreneur and music composer based in Los Angeles. His debut feature score was for the 2012 animated biopic "Pablo" (Jeff Bridges, Andy Garcia, Jon Voight), which premiered at the Rotterdam Film Festival 2012. Lior's music can be heard in numerous feature films such as "Chronicle" and "Road To Juarez" (William Forsythe) and worldwide trailers such as "Salmon Fishing in the Yemen" (Ewan McGregor, Emily Blunt), "Seeking a Friend for the End of the World" (Steve Carell, Keira Knightley) and "Microsoft Forza Motorsport 5" (Xbox One). Lior is a classically trained trumpet player who has performed and recorded with dozens of artists in his home country of Israel, including on multiple gold and platinum albums, TV appearances and film scores.

== Biography ==
Born in Tel Aviv, Israel, 1982, Lior started playing trumpet at the age of 6. By age 16, he was the principal trumpet player and soloist for the Israeli National Youth Orchestra, touring worldwide. He then served 3 years as a principal trumpet player and soloist for the Israel Defense Forces Orchestra under the baton of Izhak 'Ziko' Graziani. After his release from the IDF in 2003, Lior has performed and recorded with some of the biggest artists in Israeli music, including Tomer Yosef (Balkan Beat Box), Aviv Geffen (Blackfield), "The Tonight Show" on channel 10 and "American Idol" on Channel 2. In 2008, Lior relocated to Los Angeles to score films, TV projects, and trailers.
