= Roy Fink =

Israeli footballer and coach

Personal information
- Date of birth: 9 May 1977 (age 49)
- Place of birth: Herzliya, Israel
- Height: 5 ft 10 in (1.78 m)
- Position: Midfielder

Youth career
- 1985–1988: Maccabi Tel Aviv
- 1988–1993: Hapoel Kfar Saba
- 1993–1996: Bnei Yehuda

College career
Years	Team	Apps	(Gls)
2000–2003	Tampa Spartans	71	(53)

Senior career*
Years	Team	Apps	(Gls)
1996–1997	Hapoel Ramat Gan		
1997–1998	Hakoah Amidar Ramat Gan		
2001	Cape Cod Crusaders		
2002–2003	Boulder Rapids Reserve	14+	(3+)

International career
- Israel U16
- Israel U18

Managerial career
- 2012–2014: New Haven Chargers
- 2015–2018: Franklin Pierce Ravens
- * Club domestic league appearances and goals

Roy Fink (Hebrew: רועי פינק; born 9 May 1977) is an Israeli retired footballer and coach.

== Biography ==
Fink was born into a sporting family; his grandfather, Perry Neufeld, was a professional footballer with Maccabi Tel Aviv and was capped by the Palestine/Eretz Israel national team during the Mandate era. His mother, Thelma, held Israeli swimming records, and his sister, Tal, reached the ATP's top 100 in the youth ranks.

=== Playing career ===
Fink started his career playing for Maccabi Tel Aviv where he played for the U9-U12 Boys teams. He then transferred to Hapoel Kfar Saba, where he played all the way from U12-U16, and also played for the Israeli under-16 team.

At the age of 16 Fink was purchased by Bnei Yehuda and led the team to a second place in the under-18 league and the youth cup final, and was capped by the under-18 team.

In 1996, he moved to Hapoel Ramat Gan, before signing for city rivals Hakoah Ramat Gan in 1997. Afterwards, he joined the University of Tampa where he was a standout. In his career at the University of Tampa Fink led the Spartans to a National Championship as a captain (2001). Fink was awarded as 4 years All-Conference first team as well as four years South Region First team selection. Fink was awarded as 2000 and 2001 All-America and in 2001 National College Soccer Player of the Year. Fink was also awarded as the Jewish All American at the University of Tampa. Fink also played for Cape Cod Crusaders in the summer of 2001 and for Boulder Rapids Reserve in the summer of 2002 and 2003.

== Managerial career ==
Fink began his coaching career as the assistant director of coaching at Strictly Soccer Futbol Club in St. Petersburg, Florida, as well as serving as an assistant coach for the Colorado Rapids U-23. He served as the head coach of the University of New Haven from 2012–14, then moved to Franklin Pierce as the head coach from 2015–18.
