= Leora Bettison Robinson =

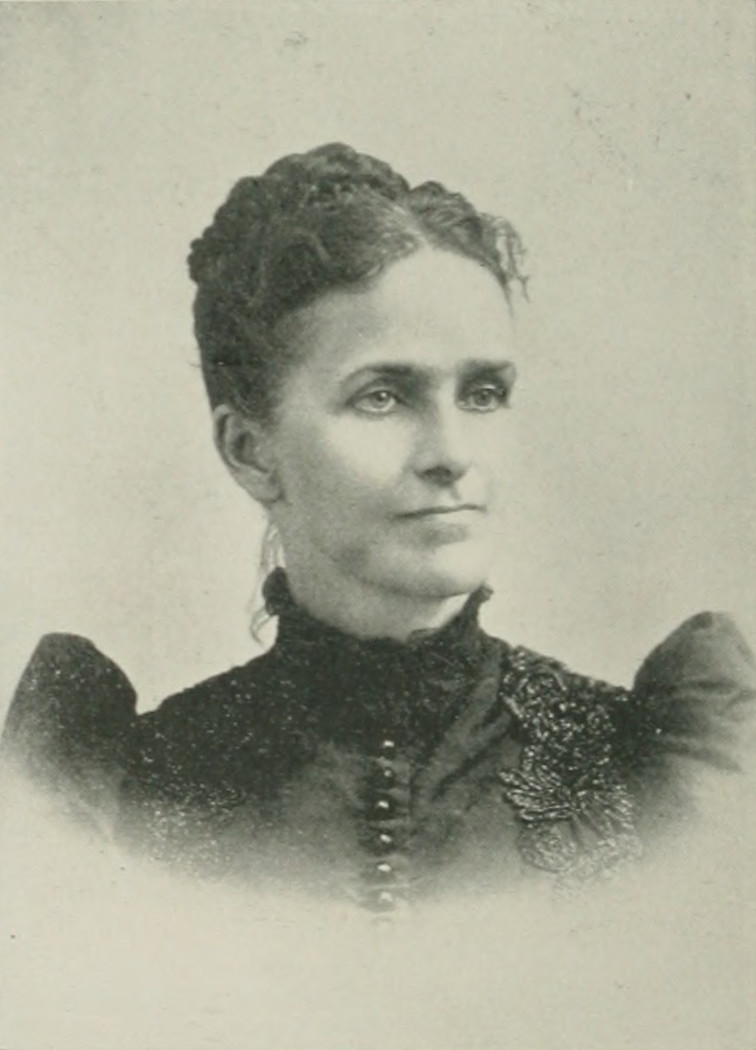
- Photo in A Woman of the Century
- Born: Leora Bettison; June 8, 1840; Little Rock, Arkansas, U.S.
- Died: January 19, 1914 (aged 73); Florida, U.S.
- Occupations: author; educator
- Spouse: Norman Robinson
- Children: 1
- Writing career
- Language: English
- Genre: Southern United States literature

Leora Bettison Robinson (née, Bettison; June 8, 1840 – January 19, 1914) was an American author and educator of the long nineteenth century. Together with her husband, she established the Holyoke Academy of Louisville, Kentucky. She was the author of The House With Spectacles, Than, Patsy, and other works.

== Early life and education ==
Leora Bettison was born in Little Rock, Arkansas, June 8, 1840. Her parents, Dr. Joseph R. Bettison and Ann Eliza Cathcart, moved to Louisville, Kentucky, before she was a year old. The Bettisons were of distinguished Huguenot lineage, being descended from Pierre Robert, of South Carolina. Bettison's family belong to the Cathcarts of Glasgow, Scotland, who, before coming to America in the seventeenth century, had settled in County Antrim, Ireland. Dr. Bettison was a surgeon in the Confederate States Army. Leora was the sixth of eleven children.

In her classes, Robinson's writings attracted attention, and many of her early efforts were published in the local papers.

She was brought up and educated in private and public schools of Louisville, being a member of the first graduating class of the girls' high school of that city in June, 1858. In speaking of her graduating essay, entitled "A Farewell From the Other End of the Class", George D. Prentice, editor of the Louisville Journal (now, The Courier-Journal ), said: "Miss Bettison is a genius, and she will, if she makes the effort, render this manifest to the world". He also paid her a signal compliment in publishing her essay entire in the Journal.

== Career ==
Since the age of sixteen, her life was devoted to educational work, starting as a teacher in the Louisville high school.

On June 29, 1864, she married Prof. Norman Robinson, a graduate of University of Rochester. The couple had one child.

Prof. and Mrs. Robinson established in Louisville a flourishing school, named Holyoke Academy. During that time, she wrote her earliest books, Than (New York, 1877), a sequel to The House With Spectacles, and Patsy (New York, 1878).

Owing to an accumulation of business interests by Prof. Robinson in Florida, they moved to that State in 1880, and resided in the capital, Tallahassee while he held the office of State chemist During the terms of office in which Dr. Robinson was the state chemist of Florida, Mrs. Robinson often assisted him in his laboratory work.

In addition to writing books, Robinson also contributed many articles to some leading magazines. As Florida correspondent of Home and Farm, she was widely known, and through her long series of truthful articles, entitled "Living in Florida", she was the means of influencing great numbers of people to settle permanently in the state.

During the last few years before her death, she was recognized as one of Florida's leading educators. She kept abreast of the times in all things educational and enjoyed reading the classics, in doing special literary work, and using her influence for the betterment of city government. Two years before her death, an article she wrote, entitled "Public Schools Remodeled", was widely copied in the Florida press.

She advocated for years the publishing of all tax assessments and the taxing of all church property throughout the United States. She was a firm believer in woman's suffrage, but during the last few years of her life, she repeatedly said that she hoped the day would never come when women would gain the vote.

While living in Louisville, she was a member of the Broadway Baptist Church; while in Florida, she belonged to the First Baptist Church of Orlando.

== Death and legacy ==
Leora Bettison Robinson died on January 19, 1914.

Lake Leora in Florida was named in her honor.

== Selected works ==
=== Books ===
- Than (New York, 1877)
- The House With Spectacles
- Patsy

=== Articles ===
- "Secrets of Home Breadmaking"
- "The Rich Goose"
