= Guillermo Sapiro =

- Born: 1966 (age 59–60); Uruguay
- Education: Technion – Israel Institute of Technology
- Occupations: Computer Scientist; Electrical Engineering

Guillermo Sapiro (born 1966) is a Uruguayan computer scientist, electrical engineer and professor who has made notable contributions to image processing. He worked at The University of Minnesota for 15 years before becoming a James B. Duke Distinguished Professor at Duke University where he spent over 12 years before moving to Princeton University as a Distinguished Augustine Family Professor. He is also a Distinguished Engineer at Apple Inc. He has also worked at Hewlett Packard Labs (HP Laboratories) researching image processing and is known for being one of the people who originally developed the LOCO-I Compression Algorithm for lossless image compression (that was used in NASA's ICER image file format for various Mars rover expeditions) while he was working there. He has also made significant contributions towards the development of the rotobrush tool in Adobe After Effects, which has been included in After Effects since version CS5. Adobe makes use of his research in various projects like Photoshop and also frequently hires his students. He also teaches a massive open online course through Coursera on image and video processing. The title of the course is "Image and video processing: From Mars to Hollywood with a stop at the hospital."

He is a Member of the National Academy of Engineer, Fellow of the American Academy of Arts and Sciences, Fellow of IEEE, and Fellow of SIAM. He is also the only scientists to have received the Test-of-Time-Award both in machine learning and in computer vision.

He lives with his wife, older son, younger daughter, and a golden doodle named Inti.
