= Emmanuel David Tannenbaum =

Israeli-American biophysicist

- עמנואל דוד טננבאום
- Born: June 28, 1978; Jerusalem, Israel
- Died: May 28, 2012 (aged 33)
- Education: Harvard University
- Spouse: Maria Litvan-Tannenbaum
- Children: Tom Tannenbaum
- Parent(s): Allen Tannenbaum; Rina Tannenbaum
- Scientific career
- Fields: Biophysics applied mathematics
- Doctoral advisor: Eric Heller

Emmanuel David Tannenbaum (Hebrew: עמנואל דוד טננבאום; June 28, 1978 – May 28, 2012) was an Israeli/American biophysicist and applied mathematician. He worked as a professor and researcher in the department of chemistry at the Ben-Gurion University of the Negev and the department of biology at the Georgia Institute of Technology, specializing in the fields of mathematical biology, systems biology, and quantum physics.

Tannenbaum's initial work was in quantum chemistry as part of his Harvard University doctoral thesis where he developed a novel partial differential equation approach to the EBK quantization of nearly separable Hamiltonians in the quasi-integrable regime. Emmanuel Tannenbaum subsequently devoted his research to studying various problems in evolutionary dynamics using quasispecies models. His seminal work centered on the key question of the evolutionary advantages of sexual reproduction. Tannenbaum demonstrated a strong selective advantage for sexual reproduction with fewer and much less restrictive assumptions than previously considered. Closely related to this line of reasoning, was the original work by Tannenbaum and James Sherley on the immortal strand hypothesis. Tannenbaum also proposed a pioneering theory of why higher organisms need sleep. Towards the end of his life, he proposed a new approach to anti-stealth technology based on the theory of Bose–Einstein condensate.

Emmanuel Tannenbaum received a number of honors, including the Robert Karplus Prize in Chemical Physics from Harvard University, the prestigious Alon Fellowship from the Israel Academy of Sciences and Humanities, and a National Institutes of Health research fellowship. Dr. Tannenbaum is the son of mathematician Allen Tannenbaum and chemist Rina Tannenbaum. His sister, Sarah Tannenbaum-Dvir, is an oncologist/hematologist.
