= Emily Austin =

American influencer (born 2001)

- Austin in 2026
- Born: May 24, 2001 (age 25); Brooklyn, New York, U.S.
- Education: Hofstra University
- Occupations: Journalist; influencer; broadcaster

Emily Austin (born May 24, 2001) is an American journalist, social media influencer, and independent NBA broadcaster.

== Early life ==
Austin was born in Brooklyn, New York, to Israeli parents, and grew up in Hewlett Harbor, on Long Island, New York. She attended Hofstra University, studying journalism.

Austin's parents are Modern Orthodox Jews and strictly keep kosher and Shabbat. She has visited Israel since her youth and follows Jewish religious traditions such as keeping kosher, making Kiddush, lighting Shabbat candles, and not working on Shabbat. She visited Poland during a Holocaust education trip at the age of 16, which she has cited as "a turning point" in her life.

== Career ==
=== Sports journalism ===
In 2021, Austin reached out to professional athletes for interviews during the COVID-19 pandemic in the United States, while she was a sophomore journalism student at Hofstra University. A former athlete, Austin began interviewing athletes on Instagram for her vlog show, Daily Vibes with Emily Austin. This led her to working at MTV on Music Lives On. She also worked for Sports Illustrated as a host at NFL and boxing events.

In 2023, Austin started an NBA podcast called The Hoop Chat w/ Emily Austin which has featured NBA players, such as Josh Giddey, Grant Williams, Jalen Brunson, and Chet Holmgren. In April 2024, Austin began working with DAZN on their boxing coverage.

=== Other work ===
Austin has worked as a model and is a conservative social media influencer. She was a judge at Miss Universe 2022. Austin has written for publications such as Newsweek. She has appeared several times as a panelist on the Fox News program Gutfeld! She is a presenter for PragerU. Austin interviewed Andrew Cuomo on her podcast The Emily Austin Show.

Austin has additionally served as a commissioner of the Nassau County Bridge Authority since 2024. She was appointed to the volunteer position in October of that year.

== Views and activism ==
In January 2023, Austin claimed that Jews were sent as "sheeps [sic] to the slaughter" during the Holocaust because they were "afraid to be vocal and proud of their identity." Austin later asserted that her comments had been taken out of context.

In July 2023, Austin defended Robert F. Kennedy Jr. after he claimed that COVID-19 was an "ethnically targeted" bioweapon that did not affect Ashkenazi Jews and Chinese. In a January 2024 PragerU video, Austin said that "racism alone wasn't the primary reason for Nazi Jew-hatred" and that racism was not the reason "[Adolf Hitler] murdered the Jews."

In October 2025, Austin announced "Hot Girls for Cuomo", a website supporting former Democratic New York state governor Andrew Cuomo's independent campaign for the 2025 New York City mayoral election. However, the domain hotgirlsforcuomo.com was first registered by someone else, who redirected it to the report of the investigation into allegations of sexual harassment made against Cuomo.

During the 68th Grammy Awards in February 2026, Austin's live video of her visibly mocking Billie Eilish's anti‑ICE acceptance speech for "Song of the Year" went viral and drew widespread criticism; Austin later defended her reaction on social media, writing that she loved America, supported lawful immigration and law enforcement, and stood by her stance amid the backlash.

=== Israel ===
Austin has described herself as a Zionist. From 2022 to 2023, Austin interned at the Permanent Mission of Israel to the United Nations as a media consultant, advising on English-language communications and public relations.

Austin has been vocal on the issue of antisemitism. In December 2023, Austin visited southern Israeli communities affected by the October 7 attacks and documented the visit on social media.
