= Sephardic Center of Mill Basin =

Orthodox Jewish synagogue in Brooklyn, New York

- Location in New York City

Religion
- Affiliation: Orthodox Judaism
- Rite: Nusach Edot Hamizrach
- Ecclesiastical or organizational status: Synagogue
- Leadership: Rabbi Yirmi Levy
- Status: Active; however undergoing renovations

Location
- Location: 6208 Strickland Avenue, Brooklyn, in New York City, New York
- Country: United States
- Interactive map of Sephardic Center of Mill Basin
- Coordinates: 40°37′01″N 73°54′36″W

Architecture
- Type: Synagogue
- Style: Modern

Specifications
- Direction of façade: East
- Materials: Concrete, glass

Website
- millbasinsc.com

The Sephardic Center of Mill Basin, also called the Sephardic Congregation of Mill Basin, is an Orthodox Jewish synagogue located at 6208 Strickland Avenue in Brooklyn, in New York City, New York, United States. The congregation practises in the Sephardic rite and primarily caters for Sephardic Jews residing in the Mill Basin, Georgetown and Bergen Beach neighborhoods of Brooklyn.

The congregation is currently led by Rabbi Yirmi Levy.

As of December 2023, the synagogue building was undergoing renovations, with services held at Temple Shalom on Avenue U and East 69th.

== See also ==
- Syrian Jewish communities of the United States
