= Leora Skolkin-Smith =

American novelist

- Born: 1952 (age 73–74); New York City, U.S.
- Education: Sarah Lawrence College (BA, MFA)
- Occupation: Writer
- Writing career
- Genre: Literary Fiction
- Notable works: Edges: O Israel, O Palestine, The Fragile Mistress, Hystera
- Website: leoraskolkinsmith.com

Leora Skolkin-Smith (born 1952 in Manhattan, New York) is an Israeli-American novelist. Her first novel, Edges: O Israel, O Palestine, was selected and edited by Grace Paley for Glad Day Books. Leora Skolkin-Smith graduated (BA and MFA) from Sarah Lawrence College.

== Edges: O Israel, O Palestine ==
Edges: O Israel, O Palestine (ISBN 9781930180147) is set in a pre-1967 Israel, during the Cold War. Characters are drawn from Israel's long-forgotten past, members of the 1940s Haganah and Jewish underground who find themselves displaced amidst the chaotic and complex tensions of an Israel just beginning to modernize and expand. Recently awarded a PEN/Faulkner Writers-in-the Schools stipend, EDGES was also picked by "The Bloomsbury Review's 25th Anniversary Issue as a "Favorite Book of the Last 25 Years". An original audio production of edges narrated by Tovah Feldshuh won an "Earphones Award" from Audiofile Magazine. EDGES was also a National Women Studies Association Conference Selection and a Jewish Book Council Selection, 2005.

== Career ==
- Panelist, on "Israel in Fiction" at the Miami International Book Fair, 2006
- Panelist, on "War in Writing", at the Virginia Festival of the Book, 2006
- Member of the National Book Critics Circle.
- Published in The Washington Post
- Published in The Quarterly Conversation
- Published in The Hamilton Stone Review
- Novel, Edges, developed into Feature Film by Triboro Pictures, retitled "The Fragile Mistress"
- Novel, Hystera,"
- Contributing Editor to Readysteadybook.com
- Cantaraville Three
