= Rina Tannenbaum =

American chemical engineer

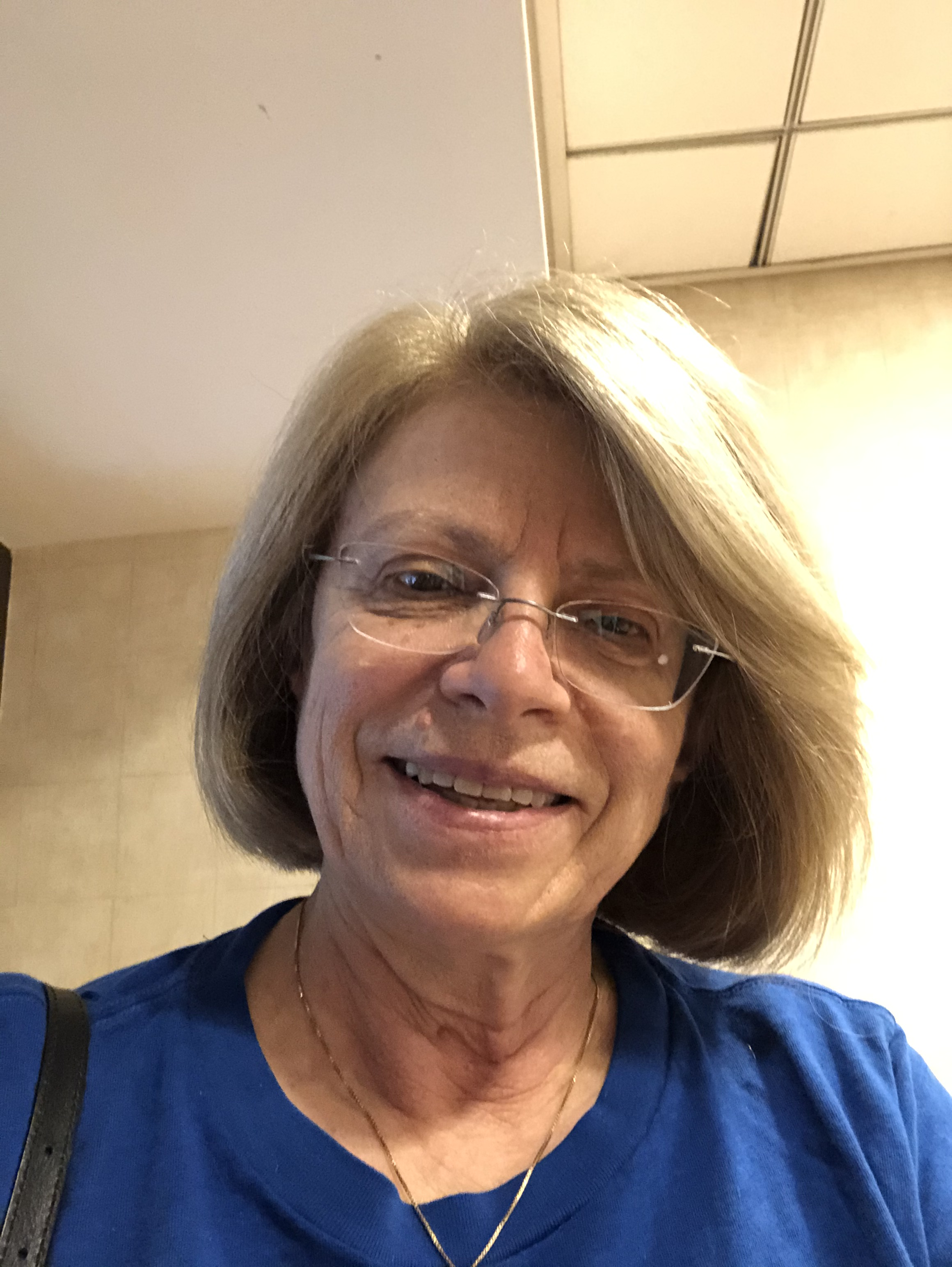
Prof. Rina Tannenbaum

Rina (Irena) Tannenbaum (born December 13, 1953) is an Israeli/American materials scientist and chemical engineer and presently professor in the program of chemical and molecular engineering in the department of materials science and engineering at the State University of New York at Stony Brook. She received her Ph.D. in chemical engineering from the Swiss Federal Institute of Technology in Zurich.

She has performed research in numerous areas, including potential applications of carbon nanotubes, self-assembly, block copolymers, cellulose nanocomposites and tissue engineering. She has authored more than 150 publications in these fields that were published in top-tier journals, such as those of the American Chemical Society, Wiley and Elsevier .

For her work she has received many awards and was involved in a variety of professional activities. For example, she was a co-organizer of Symposium Y at the Spring 2001 Materials Research Society Meeting, was a plenary speaker at the Third International Conference on Polymer Behavior (ICPB3) in 2008, and delivered the WISE 10th Anniversary Distinguished Lecture at the University of Southern California in the fall of 2009. To date she has published over 200 peer-reviewed articles, reviews and conference proceedings.
