= 1939 in Norwegian football =

Football in Norway
Men's football
- Norgesserien: Fredrikstad
- NM: Sarpsborg

Results from Norwegian football in 1939.

== Norgesserien 1938/39 ==
=== District I ===
Pos	Team	Pld	W	D	L	GF	GA	GD	Pts	Qualification or relegation
1	Fredrikstad (C)	12	10	0	2	44	21	+23	20	Qualification for the championship play-offs quarter-final
2	Sarpsborg	12	9	1	2	34	16	+18	19	
3	Torp	12	8	0	4	42	29	+13	16	
4	Moss	12	5	3	4	22	18	+4	13	
5	Lisleby	12	3	1	8	16	43	−27	7	
6	Kvik Halden	12	2	2	8	14	30	−16	6	
7	Tistedalen (R)	12	1	1	10	21	36	−15	3	Relegation

Source: rsssf.no
(C) Champions; (R) Relegated

=== District II, Group A ===
Pos	Team	Pld	W	D	L	GF	GA	GD	Pts	Qualification or relegation
1	Skeid	14	13	1	0	58	13	+45	27	Qualification for the championship play-offs preliminary round
2	Lyn	14	8	2	4	36	13	+23	18	
3	Jevnaker	14	7	1	6	39	43	−4	15	
4	Vålerengen	14	5	1	8	30	38	−8	11	
5	Skiold	14	5	1	8	27	37	−10	11	
6	Drafn	14	5	1	8	18	35	−17	11	
7	Berger (R)	14	4	2	8	22	41	−19	10	Relegation
8	Lillestrøm (R)	14	3	3	8	25	35	−10	9	Relegation

Source: rsssf.no
(R) Relegated

=== District II, Group B ===
Pos	Team	Pld	W	D	L	GF	GA	GD	Pts	Qualification or relegation
1	Nydalen	12	8	2	2	27	19	+8	18	Qualification for the championship play-offs preliminary round
2	Mjøndalen	12	5	3	4	26	15	+11	13	
3	Frigg	12	4	4	4	25	22	+3	12	
4	Gjøa	12	6	0	6	30	28	+2	12	
5	Strong	12	5	2	5	22	25	−3	12	
6	Strømsgodset	12	4	3	5	27	32	−5	11	
7	Geithus (R)	12	1	4	7	22	38	−16	6	Relegation

Source: rsssf.no
(R) Relegated

=== District III ===
Pos	Team	Pld	W	D	L	GF	GA	GD	Pts	Qualification or relegation
1	Hamar	12	10	2	0	53	12	+41	22	Qualification for the championship play-offs quarter-final
2	Gjøvik-Lyn	12	8	2	2	38	8	+30	18	
3	Vardal	12	4	2	6	19	28	−9	10	
4	Fremad	12	3	3	6	21	29	−8	9	
5	Raufoss	12	3	3	6	15	32	−17	9	
6	Kapp	12	2	4	6	18	29	−11	8	
7	Skreia (R)	12	3	2	7	18	44	−26	8	Relegation

Source: rsssf.no
(R) Relegated

=== District IV, Group A ===
Pos	Team	Pld	W	D	L	GF	GA	GD	Pts	Qualification or relegation
1	Odd	12	9	2	1	43	7	+36	20	Qualification for the championship play-offs preliminary round
2	Pors	12	9	1	2	44	16	+28	19	
3	Snøgg	12	4	4	4	18	28	−10	12	
4	Sandefjord BK	12	3	3	6	21	30	−9	9	
5	Tønsberg Turn	12	2	5	5	17	36	−19	9	
6	Storm	12	2	4	6	19	23	−4	8	
7	Larvik Turn (R)	12	3	1	8	18	40	−22	7	Relegation

Source: rsssf.no
(R) Relegated

=== District IV, Group B ===
Pos	Team	Pld	W	D	L	GF	GA	GD	Pts	Qualification or relegation
1	Ørn	12	10	1	1	40	16	+24	21	Qualification for the championship play-offs preliminary round
2	Fram Larvik	12	9	1	2	38	15	+23	19	
3	Skiens Grane	12	5	4	3	26	16	+10	14	
4	Skien	12	4	3	5	25	30	−5	11	
5	Urædd	12	3	3	6	30	23	+7	9	
6	Borg	12	2	2	8	18	37	−19	6	
7	Holmestrand (R)	12	1	2	9	18	58	−40	4	Relegation

Source: rsssf.no
(R) Relegated

=== District V, Group A ===
Pos	Team	Pld	W	D	L	GF	GA	GD	Pts	Qualification or relegation
1	Flekkefjord	10	8	1	1	27	15	+12	17	Qualification for the championship play-offs preliminary round
2	Grane Arendal	10	7	2	1	27	13	+14	16	
3	Start	10	3	3	4	16	16	0	9	
4	Vigør	10	2	4	4	14	14	0	8	
5	Donn	10	2	4	4	15	24	−9	8	
6	Fjell (R)	10	1	0	9	8	25	−17	2	Relegation

Source: rsssf.no
(R) Relegated

=== District V, Group B ===
Pos	Team	Pld	W	D	L	GF	GA	GD	Pts	Qualification or relegation
1	Stavanger	12	8	1	3	26	17	+9	17	Qualification for the championship play-offs preliminary
2	Ålgård	12	7	2	3	25	14	+11	16	
3	Viking	12	5	3	4	20	19	+1	13	
4	Vard	12	3	5	4	28	24	+4	11	
5	Ulf-Sandnes	12	4	2	6	25	27	−2	10	
6	Brodd	12	2	5	5	13	24	−11	9	
7	Jarl (R)	12	3	2	7	20	32	−12	8	Relegation

Source: rsssf.no
(R) Relegated

=== District VI ===
Pos	Team	Pld	W	D	L	GF	GA	GD	Pts	Qualification or relegation
1	Hardy	10	7	3	0	26	10	+16	17	Qualification for the championship play-offs quarter-final
2	Djerv	10	5	4	1	29	13	+16	14	
3	Brann	10	4	2	4	14	18	−4	10	
4	Voss	10	3	2	5	14	20	−6	8	
5	Årstad	10	3	2	5	11	19	−8	8	
6	Viggo (R)	10	0	3	7	3	17	−14	3	Relegation

Source: rsssf.no
(R) Relegated

=== District VII ===
Pos	Team	Pld	W	D	L	GF	GA	GD	Pts	Qualification or relegation
1	Kristiansund	10	8	1	1	46	11	+35	17	Qualification for the championship play-offs quarter-final
2	Clausenengen	10	8	0	2	31	20	+11	16	
3	Aalesund	10	5	2	3	25	20	+5	12	
4	Rollon	10	4	1	5	20	21	−1	9	
5	Braatt	10	2	0	8	21	41	−20	4	
6	Nordlandet (R)	10	1	0	9	14	44	−30	2	Relegation

Source: rsssf.no
(R) Relegated

=== District VIII ===
Pos	Team	Pld	W	D	L	GF	GA	GD	Pts	Qualification or relegation
1	Rosenborg	12	7	3	2	38	19	+19	17	Qualification for the championship play-offs quarter-final
2	Neset	12	5	4	3	27	13	+14	14	
3	Ranheim	12	6	2	4	27	21	+6	14	
4	Steinkjer	12	4	4	4	21	19	+2	12	
5	Brage	12	5	2	5	24	24	0	12	
6	National	12	4	1	7	17	31	−14	9	
7	Verdal (R)	12	2	2	8	15	42	−27	6	Relegation

Source: rsssf.no
(R) Relegated

=== Championship rounds ===
==== First round ====
1st leg

May 21: Nydalen-Skeid 0–3

Odd-Ørn 0-3

May 26: Stavanger IF-Flekkefjord 1–0

2nd leg

May 25: Skeid-Nydalen 2-2 (Total 5–2)
May 26: Ørn-Odd 1-2 (Total 4–2)
May 29: Flekkefjord-Stavanger IF 2-3 (Total 2–4)

==== Quarter-finals ====
1st leg

June 4: Hamar-Fredrikstad 2–1

Skeid-Ørn 5-0
Hardy-Stavanger IF 2-2
Rosenborg-Kristiansund 5-1

2nd leg

June 11: Fredrikstad-Hamar 4-1 (Total 5–3)

Ørn-Skeid 4-3 (Total 5-8)
Stavanger IF-Hardy 3-5 (Total 5-7)
Kristiansund-Rosenborg 2-2 (Total 3-7)

==== Semi-finals ====
June 25: Rosenborg-Skeid 0–1

Hardy-Fredrikstad 1-1 (extra time)

===== First rematch =====
July 2: Fredrikstad-Hardy 2-2 (extra time)

===== Second rematch =====
July 9: Hardy-Fredrikstad 2-3 (extra time)

==== Championship final ====
July 16: Fredrikstad-Skeid 2–1

== Promotion ==
Briskebyen, Egersund, Kvik Trondheim, Mandalskameratene, Molde, Pallas, selbak, Solberg, Tønsbergkameratene, Ulefoss, Vikersund

== Norwegian Cup ==
=== Final ===
15 October 1939

Sarpsborg	2–1	Skeid
Yven 30'; Navestad 88'	Report	Borgen 24'

Tønsberg Gressbane, Tønsberg
Attendance: 8,000
Referee: Gullik Hagajore (Tønsberg Turn)

== Northern Norwegian Cup ==
=== Final ===
Glimt	3–0	Kirkenes
	Report

== National team ==
2 June 1939 Friendly	Sweden	3–2	Norway	Solna, Sweden
19:15 (UTC+1); Match 136	Martinsson 59'; Andersson 69'; Persson 84'	Report	Frantzen 39', 43'	Stadium: Råsunda Stadium; Attendance: 28,283; Referee: Valdemar Laursen (Denmark)

14 June 1939 Friendly; DBU 50th Anniversary Tournament; Semifinal	Norway	1–0	Sweden	Copenhagen, Denmark
19:00 (UTC+1); Match 137	Martinsen 83'	Report		Stadium: Københavns Idrætspark; Attendance: 18,000; Referee: Alfred Birlem (Germany)

18 June 1939 Friendly; DBU 50th Anniversary Tournament; Final	Denmark	6–3	Norway	Copenhagen, Denmark
13:30 (UTC+1); Match 138	P. Jørgensen 3', 54', 80'; Thielsen 17'; A. Sørensen 48'; Christensen 57'	Report	Frantzen 14'; Brustad 25'; Kvammen 41'	Stadium: Københavns Idrætspark; Attendance: 37,000; Referee: Alfred Birlem (Germany)

22 June 1939 Friendly	Norway	0–4	Germany	Aker, Norway
19:15 (UTC+1); Match 139		Report	Urban 14'; Janes 57'; Schön 59', 70'	Stadium: Ullevaal Stadion; Attendance: 29,100; Referee: Ivan Eklind (Sweden)

3 September 1939 1937–47 Nordic Championship	Finland	1–2	Norway	Helsinki, Finland
17:00 (UTC+2); Match 140	Eronen 63'	Report	Andersen 7', 60'	Stadium: Helsinki Olympic Stadium; Attendance: 8,729; Referee: Rudolf Eklöw (Sweden)

17 September 1939 1937–47 Nordic Championship	Norway	2–3	Sweden	Aker, Norway
13:15 (UTC+1); Match 141	Navestad 8' (pen.); Yven 84'	Report	Nyberg 19', 73'; Lennartsson 81'	Stadium: Ullevaal Stadion; Attendance: 29,504; Referee: Einer Ulrich (Denmark)

22 October 1939 1937–47 Nordic Championship	Denmark	4–1	Norway	Copenhagen, Denmark
13:30 (UTC+1); Match 142	Albrechtsen 6'; Friedmann 49'; P. Jørgensen 68', 85'	Report	Brynildsen 33'	Stadium: Københavns Idrætspark; Attendance: 27,000; Referee: Ivan Eklind (Sweden)
