= 1937–47 Nordic Football Championship =

Tournament details
- Host countries: Denmark; Finland; Norway; Sweden
- Dates: 13 June 1937 – 10 October 1947
- Teams: 4
- Venues: 5 (in 5 host cities)

Final positions
- Champions: Sweden (2nd title)
- Runners-up: Denmark
- Third place: Norway
- Fourth place: Finland

Tournament statistics
- Matches played: 24
- Goals scored: 118 (4.92 per match)
- Top scorer(s): (Sweden) Gunnar Nordahl (7 goals)

The 1937–47 Nordic Football Championship was the fourth Nordic Football Championship staged. Four Nordic countries participated, Denmark, Finland, Norway and Sweden. The tournament was arranged by the Football Association of Finland. The trophy was named Suomen Karhut (Finnish Bears). The tournament which was originally supposed to end in 1940, but the Second World War interrupted it and the last six matches were not played until 1947.

== Results ==
=== 1937 ===
13 June 1937

Denmark	5-1	Norway
Kleven 20'; Søbirk 30', 59'; K. Hansen 64'; Rasmussen 89'	Report	Martinsen 23'

Idrætsparken, Copenhagen, Denmark
Attendance: 22,000
Referee: Willy Peters (Germany)
16 June 1937

Sweden	4-0	Finland
Bunke 60', 82'; Persson 65'; Svanström 68'	Report

Ullevaal Stadion, Oslo, Norway
Attendance: 19,574
Referee: Willy Peters (Germany)
5 September 1937

Finland	0-2	Norway
	Report	Martinsen 21', 53'

Töölön Pallokenttä, Helsinki, Finland
Attendance: 7,881
Referee: Sölve Flisberg (Sweden)
19 September 1937
13:15 (UTC+1:00)

Norway	3-2	Sweden
Brustad 44'; Isaksen 74'; Kvammen 76'	Report	Johansson 55'; Bunke 82'

Ullevaal Stadion, Oslo, Norway
Attendance: 29,344
Referee: Arthur Barton (England)
3 October 1937
14:00 (UTC+1:00)

Sweden	1-2	Denmark
Persson 86'	Report	Andersen 18'; Søbirk 58'

Råsunda, Stockholm, Sweden
Attendance: 38,000
Referee: Jimmy Jewell (England)
17 October 1937
13:30 (UTC+1:00)

Denmark	2-1	Finland
Andersen 48'; Friedmann 58'	Report	Mäkelä 24'

Idrætsparken, Copenhagen, Denmark
Attendance: 32,000
Referee: Alfred Birlem (Germany)

=== 1938 ===
17 June 1938
19:30 (UTC+1:00)

Norway	9-0	Finland
Isaksen 3'; Brustad 11', 22', 25', 33'; Kvammen 17' (pen.), 51'; Andersen 67'; Arnesen 70'	Report

Ullevaal Stadion, Oslo, Norway
Attendance: 28,000
Referee: Valdemar Laursen (Denmark)
21 June 1938
19:00 (UTC+1:00)

Denmark	0-1	Sweden
	Report	Nyberg 35'

Idrætsparken, Copenhagen, Denmark
Attendance: 38,260
Referee: Thoralv Kristiansen (Norway)
4 July 1938
19:00 (UTC+2:00)

Finland	2-4	Sweden
Lintamo 2'; Granström 37'	Report	Lagerkrantz 27', 67'; Bergström 51'; Nyberg 74'

Helsinki Olympic Stadium, Helsinki, Finland
Attendance: 15,366
Referee: Peco Bauwens (Germany)
31 August 1938
18:00 (UTC+2:00)

Finland	2-1	Denmark
Lintamo 15'; Lehtonen 46'	Report	Sørensen 59'

Pallokenttä, Helsinki, Finland
Attendance: 11,368
Referee: Rudolf Eklöv (Sweden)
18 September 1938
13:15 (UTC+1:00)

Norway	1-1	Denmark
Arnesen 33'	Report	Hansen 42'

Ullevaal stadion, Oslo, Norway
Attendance: 33,065
Referee: Eklöv (Sweden)
2 October 1938
14:00 (UTC+1:00)

Sweden	2-3	Norway
Persson 27'; Nyberg 66'	Report	Brustad 16'; Brynildsen 18'; Nordahl 35'

Råsunda Stadium, Solna, Sweden
Attendance: 38,000
Referee: Jimmy Jewell (England)

=== 1939 ===
9 June 1939
19:30 (UTC+1:00)

Sweden	5-1	Finland
Andersson 13'; Persson 30', 64', 67'; Grahn 35' (pen.)	Report	Nilsson 10' (o.g.)

Råsunda Stadium, Solna, Sweden
Attendance: 16,989
Referee: Reidar Randers Johansen (Norway)
3 September 1939
17:00 (UTC+2:00)

Finland	1-2	Norway
Eronen 63'	Report	Andersen 7', 60'

Helsinki Olympic Stadium, Helsinki, Finland
Attendance: 8,729
Referee: Rudolf Eklöw (Sweden)
17 September 1939
13:15 (UTC+1:00)

Norway	2-3	Sweden
Navestad 8' (pen.); Yven 84'	Report	Nyberg 19', 73'; Lennartsson 81'

Ullevaal stadion, Oslo, Norway
Attendance: 29,504
Referee: Einer Ulrich (Denmark)
17 September 1939
13:30 (UTC+1:00)

Denmark	8-1	Finland
Nielsen 24'; Thiesen 39', 57', 89'; Lindbäck 48' (o.g.); Jørgensen 67'; Albrechtsen 77'; Søbirk 87'	Report	Granström 69'

Idrætsparken, Copenhagen, Denmark
Attendance: 20,000
Referee: Eklind (Sweden)
1 October 1939
14:00 (UTC+1:00)

Sweden	4-1	Denmark
Lennartsson 35'; Johansson 43'; Nyström 57'; Dahl 84'	Report	Jørgensen 7'

Råsunda, Stockholm, Sweden
Attendance: 22,698
Referee: Dæhlen (Norway)
22 October 1939
13:30 (UTC+1:00)

Denmark	4-1	Norway
Albrechtsen 6'; Friedmann 49'; Jørgensen 68', 85'	Report	Brynildsen 34'

Idrætsparken, Copenhagen
Attendance: 27,000
Referee: Eklind (Sweden)

=== 1947 ===
15 June 1947
13:30 (UTC+2:00)

Denmark	1-4	Sweden
K.A. Hansen 57'	Report	Nordahl 7', 22'; Liedholm 33'; Lindskog 49'

Idrætsparken, Copenhagen
Attendance: 38,000
Referee: Reader (England)
24 August 1947
13:30 (UTC+1:00)

Sweden	7-0	Finland
Liedholm 4', 52'; Nordahl 5', 30', 40'; Gren 9' (pen.); Turunen 78' (o.g.)	Report

Ryavallen, Borås, Sweden
Attendance: 38,000
Referee: Aksel Asmussen (Denmark)
7 September 1947
15:00 (UTC+2:00)

Finland	3-3	Norway
Reunanen 10'; Myntti 20', 23'	Report	Dahlen 21'; Sørensen 41'; Brynildsen 88' (pen.)

Helsinki Olympic Stadium, Helsinki, Finland
Attendance: 13,533
Referee: Valdemar Laursen (Denmark)
21 September 1947
13:15 (UTC+1:00)

Norway	3-5	Denmark
Thoresen 35'; Osnes 42' (pen.), 71'	Report	G. Hansen 1' (o.g.); J. Hansen 10', 82'; Præst 13', 83'

Ullevaal, Oslo
Attendance: 34,756
Referee: Nilsson (Sweden)
5 October 1947
13:30 (UTC+1:00)

Denmark	4-1	Finland
J. Hansen 2'; Præst 4', 23'; Sørensen 57'	Report	Stolpe 80'

Aarhus Stadion, Aarhus, Denmark
Attendance: 22,300
Referee: John Erik Andersson (Sweden)
5 October 1947
15:00 (UTC+1:00)

Sweden	4-1	Norway
Liedholm 9'; Nordahl 15', 70'; Gren 71'	Report	Kvammen 41'

Råsunda Stadium, Solna, Sweden
Attendance: 36,134
Referee: George Reader (England)

== Table ==
	Team	Pld	W	D	L	GF	GA	GD	Pts
1	Sweden	12	9	0	3	41	16	+25	18
2	Denmark	12	7	1	4	34	21	+13	15
3	Norway	12	5	2	5	31	30	+1	12
4	Finland	12	1	1	10	12	51	–39	3

== Winners ==
1937–47 Nordic Football Championship winners

Sweden
Second title

== Statistics ==
=== Goalscorers ===
There were 118 goals scored in 24 matches, for an average of 4.92 goals per match.

7 goals

- (Sweden) Gunnar Nordahl

6 goals

- (Sweden) Erik Persson
- (Norway) Arne Brustad

5 goals

- (Sweden) Arne Nyberg

4 goals

- (Sweden) Nils Liedholm
- (Denmark) Karl Aage Præst
- (Denmark) Pauli Jørgensen
- (Denmark) Helmuth Søbirk
- (Norway) Reidar Kvammen

3 goals

- (Denmark) Jørgen Wagner Hansen
- (Denmark) Oskar Theisen
- (Norway) Alf Martinsen
- (Norway) Torkild Andersen
- (Norway) Knut Brynildsen
- (Sweden) Lennart Bunke

2 goals

- (Denmark) Alex Friedmann
- (Denmark) Kaj Hansen
- (Denmark) Knud Andersen
- (Denmark) Svend Albrechtsen
- (Finland) Holger Granström
- (Finland) Nuutti Lintamo
- (Finland) Stig-Göran Myntti
- (Norway) Magnar Isaksen
- (Norway) Trygve Arnesen
- (Norway) Knut Osnes
- (Sweden) Floyd Lagerkrantz
- (Sweden) Ragnar Lennartsson
- (Sweden) Gunnar Gren

1 goal

- (Denmark) Arne Sørensen
- (Denmark) Arno Nielsen
- (Denmark) Eyolf Kleven
- (Denmark) Jørgen Leschly Sørensen
- (Denmark) Karl Aage Hansen
- (Denmark) Peder Rasmussen
- (Finland) Aatos Lehtonen
- (Finland) Pentti Eronen
- (Finland) Eino Mäkelä
- (Finland) Harry Reunanen
- (Finland) Olof Stolpe
- (Norway) Gunnar Dahlen
- (Norway) Gunnar Thoresen
- (Norway) Hans Nordahl
- (Norway) Harry Yven
- (Norway) Olav Navestad
- (Norway) Odd Wang Sørensen
- (Sweden) Åke Andersson
- (Sweden) Gösta Dahl
- (Sweden) Karl-Erik Grahn
- (Sweden) Kurt Svanström
- (Sweden) Knut Johansson
- (Sweden) Georg Johansson
- (Sweden) Gunnar Bergström
- (Sweden) Lennart Lindskog
- (Sweden) Stig Nyström

== See also ==
Balkan Cup
Baltic Cup
Central European International Cup
Mediterranean Cup
