= List of Tromsø IL seasons =

This is a list of seasons played by Tromsø IL in Norwegian and European football, from 1921 to the most recent completed season. It details the club's achievements in major competitions, and the top scorers for some season.

Season	League	Tier	Pos.	Pl.	W	D	L	GS	GA	P	Cup	NN-Cup	Europe		Notes	League Top Scorer
1921	Local		2	6	4	0	2	14	14	8						
1922	Local		3	6	3	0	3	8	15	6						
1923	Local		3	6	1	1	4	12	22	3						
1924	Local		3	6	1	2	3	14	17	4						
1925	Local		2	2	1	0	1	7	5	2						
1926	Local		2	2	1	0	1	5	7	2						
1927	Local		1	3	2	0	1	7	8	4						
1928	Local		2	4	1	1	2	11	9	3						
The Northern Norwegian Cup is founded.
1929	Local		2	3	2	0	1	10	2	4		Semi-final				
1930	Local		2	3	2	0	1	9	5	4		Semi-final				
1931	Local		2	3	1	1	1	6	4	3		Winners				
1932	Local		1	3	3	0	0	8	1	6		Semi-final				
1933	Local		1	6	4	1	1	14	10	9		First round				Gustav Dalsbø (6)
1934	Local		6	5	2	0	3	8	12	4		Semi-final				Isak Shotland, Gustav Dalsbø (2)
1935	Local		3	5	3	0	2	13	11	6		First round				Gustav Dalsbø, Daniel Olsen (4)
1936	Local		1	5	4	1	0	16	6	9		Second round				
1937	Local		1	5	3	1	1	17	8	7		Runners-up				
1938	Local		3	5	3	0	2	11	17	6		First round				
1939	Local		6	5	0	0	5	5	23	0		Semi-final				Helge Bendiksen (2)
No football between 1940 and 1945 due to World War II
1945	Local		2	5	2	2	1	9	6						League played as cup	Nordvald Johansen, Jens Jensen, Helge Bendiksen, Hans Mortensen (2)
1946	Local		1	8	7	0	1	29	11	14		Semi-final				Ingvald Jeremiassen, Gudmund Gundersen (9)
1947	Local		5	7	2	3	2	15	10	7		Third round				Ingvald Jeremiassen (5)
1948	Local		2	5	3	1	1	11	9	7		First round				Hans Mortensen (5)
1949	Local		2	5	3	1	1	14	7	7		Winners				Helge Bendiksen, Gudmund Gundersen (4)
1950	Local		1	5	5	0	0	23	4	10		Second round				Hans Mortensen (7)
1951	Local		1	10	10	0	0	40	7	20		Second round				Oskar Theodorsen, Sigmund Hemmingsen (9)
1952	Local		1	5	5	0	0	31	4	10		Runners-up				Sigmund Hemmingsen (13)
1953	Local		1	5	5	0	0	23	2	10		Third round				Sigmund Hemmingsen (8)
1954	Local		1	5	4	0	1	18	11	8		Third round				Leif Johnsen (8)
Districts 9 and 10 included in the 1st division
1955	1D10	III	3	8	3	3	2	16	11	9		Quarter-final				Arnold Jensen (5)
1956	1D10	III	4	9	3	3	3	13	10	9		Winners				Egil Johansen (6)
1957	1D10	III	3	10	5	0	5	18	16	10		Quarter-final				Tor Brandeggen (9)
The 1st division changes its name to the 3rd division.
1958	3D10	III	3	10	4	2	4	19	14	10		Quarter-final				Tor Brandeggen (5)
1959	3D10	III	2	10	8	0	2	34	13	16		Quarter-final				Edmund Kristoffersen (13)
1960	3D10	III	4	10	5	2	3	32	18	12		Semi-final				Tor Brandeggen (8)
1961	3D10	III	5	10	3	1	6	16	19	7		Third round				Tor Brandeggen, Jan Willy Klungseth (5)
1962	3D10	III	4	10	4	1	5	18	19	9		Quarter-final				Egil Bygdnes (6)
Northern Norwegian clubs allowed into the cup for the first time.
1963	3D10	III	2	10	6	1	3	14	12	13		Semi-final				Tor Brandeggen (4)
1964	3D10	III	3	10	6	2	2	19	15	14	Second round	Semi-final				Jon Risa (4)
1965	3D10	III	4	10	4	1	5	15	17	9	Second round	Third round				Jan Willy Klungseth (5)
1966	3D10	III	↓ 5	10	2	2	6	12	25	6		Quarter-final			Relegated	Per Steinar Hansen, Egil Bygdnes, John Nilsen, Jon Risa (2)
1967	4DT	IV	2	14	7	6	1	31	11	20		Third round				Jon Risa (10)
1968	4DT	IV	2	14	9	0	5	31	17	18		Semi-final				Svein Hugo Hansen (10)
1969	4DT	IV	4	14	6	3	5	20	17	15	First round	Second round				Svein Hugo Hansen (5)
Northern Norwegian 4th division given status as 3rd division. Northern Norwegian Cup discontinued.
1970	3DT	III	↑ 1	14	10	0	4	30	13	20	First round				Won play-off, promoted	Steinar Pedersen (10)
1971	2DC	II	3	14	7	5	2	29	21	19	Second qual. round					Sigurd Dale, Jens Petter Jensen (8)
Northern Norwegian clubs are allowed to be promoted to the top flight for the first time.
1972	2DC	II	↓ 7	14	3	3	8	12	23	9	Third round				Relegated	Jens Petter Jensen (4)
1973	3DT	III	2	14	10	2	2	33	9	22	Second qual. round					Arne Andreassen, Torfinn Ingebrigtsen (10)
1974	3DT	III	↑1	14	8	4	2	31	12	20	Third round				Won play-off, promoted	Jack Andersen (9)
1975	2DC	II	↓ 6	14	4	4	6	23	16	12	Third round				Relegated	Arne Andreassen (4)
1976	3DT	III	2	18	11	5	2	57	13	27	1st qual round					Hans Tore Bjerkås (11)
1977	3DT	III	↑1	18	13	4	1	49	18	30	Second round				Won play-off, promoted	Hans Tore Bjerkås (15)
1978	2DC	II	1	18	12	3	3	43	15	27	Fourth round				Lost play-off	Terje Nikolaysen (11)
The 2nd division changes from having three groups (A, B, and C) to two (A and B).
1979	2DB	II	↓ 11	22	5	4	13	24	52	14	Third round				Relegated	Terje Nikolaysen (10)
1980	3DF	III	↑ 1	18	14	4	0	43	9	32	Second round				Promoted	Trond Gunnar Nilsen (15)
1981	2DB	II	↓ 10	22	4	9	9	12	28	17	First round				Relegated	Einar Walsøe (3)
1982	3DF	III	↑ 1	18	15	2	1	50	13	32	Third round				Promoted	Trond Gunnar Nilsen (12)
1983	2DB	II	6	22	5	11	6	19	24	21	First round					Lars Espejord (5)
1984	2DB	II	4	22	11	4	7	46	33	26	First round					Trond Johansen (15)
1985	2DB	II	↑ 2	22	15	3	4	45	20	33	Semi-final				Won play-off, promoted	Sigmund Forfang (7)
1986	1D	I	10	22	6	6	10	23	32	18	Winners				Won play-off	Trond Johansen (6)
1987	1D	I	6	22	5	7/2	8	19	31	31	Quarter-final		CWC	First round		Per-Mathias Høgmo (6)
1988	1D	I	5	22	9	6	7	27	22	33	Fourth round					Lars Espejord (6)
1989	1D	I	3	22	11	4	7	36	25	37	Fourth round					Mike McCabe (10)
1990	1D	I	2	22	12	6	4	36	21	42	Quarter-final					Mike McCabe (13)
The 1st division changes its name to Tippeligaen.
1991	TL	I	6	22	9	4	9	28	34	31	Quarter-final		UC	First round		Stein Berg Johansen (10)
1992	TL	I	8	22	6	6	10	22	37	24	Quarter-final					Sigurd Rushfeldt, Bjørn Johansen (4)
1993	TL	I	6	22	6	8	8	25	25	26	Quarter-final					Sigurd Rushfeldt (9)
1994	TL	I	7	22	7	7	8	22	28	28	Quarter-final					Sigurd Rushfeldt (13)
1995	TL	I	6	26	11	5	10	53	42	38	Quarter-final		IC	Group stage		Tore André Flo (18)
1996	TL	I	5	26	11	8	7	46	41	41	Winners					Sigurd Rushfeldt (15)
1997	TL	I	12	26	6	10	10	37	44	28	Fourth round		CWC	Second round	Won play-off	Ole Martin Årst (9)
1998	TL	I	11	26	7	7	12	39	48	28	Fourth round					Rune Lange (20)
1999	TL	I	6	26	13	5	8	70	46	44	Semi-final					Rune Lange (23)*
2000	TL	I	4	26	13	5	8	51	46	44	Fourth round					Tryggvi Guðmundsson (15)
2001	TL	I	↓14	26	4	4	18	23	52	16	Quarter-final				Relegated	Abdoulaye M'Baye (6)
2002	1D	II	↑ 1	30	21	4	5	78	36	67	Quarter-final				Promoted	Morten Gamst Pedersen (18)*
2003	TL	I	11	26	8	5	13	30	52	29	Semi-final					Peter Kovacs (8)
2004	TL	I	4	26	12	4	10	38	32	40	Fourth round		RL	Group stage		Ole Martin Årst (11)
2005	TL	I	8	26	8	10	8	31	30	34	Third round		UC	Group stage		Ole Martin Årst (16)*
2006	TL	I	10	26	8	5	13	33	39	29	Third round					Ole Martin Årst (11)
2007	TL	I	6	26	12	4	10	45	44	40	Fourth round					Morten Moldskred (12)
2008	TL	I	3	26	12	8	6	36	23	44	Fourth round					Morten Moldskred (10)
2009	TL	I	6	30	10	10	10	35	36	40	Quarter-final		EL	Play-off round		Sigurd Rushfeldt (9)
2010	TL	I	3	30	14	8	8	36	30	50	Fourth round					Sigurd Rushfeldt, George Mourad (8)
2011	TL	I	2	30	15	8	7	56	34	53	Fourth round		EL	Second qualifying round		Mostafa Abdellaoue (17)*
2012	TL	I	4	30	14	7	9	45	32	49	Runners-up		EL	Play-off round		Zdeněk Ondrášek (14)*
2013	TL	I	↓ 15	30	7	8	15	41	50	29	Fourth round		EL	Group stage	Relegated	Zdeněk Ondrášek (8)
2014	1D	II	↑ 2	30	18	5	7	67	27	59	Third round		EL	Second qualifying round	Promoted	Zdeněk Ondrášek (15)
2015	TL	I	13	30	7	8	15	36	50	29	Second round					Zdeněk Ondrášek (9)
2016	TL	I	13	30	9	7	14	36	46	34	Quarter-final					Thomas Lehne Olsen (8)
2017	ES	I	11	30	10	8	12	42	49	38	Fourth round					Thomas Lehne Olsen (10)
2018	ES	I	10	30	11	3	16	41	48	36	Fourth round					Runar Espejord (6)
2019	ES	I	↓ 15	30	8	6	16	39	58	30	Third round				Relegated	Onni Valakari (7)
2020	1D	II	↑ 1	30	19	6	5	60	29	63	Cancelled				Promoted	Kent-Are Antonsen, Eric Kitolano (11)
2021	ES	I	12	30	8	11	11	33	44	35	Second round					August Mikkelsen (8)
2022	ES	I	7	30	10	13	7	46	49	43	Quarter-final					Eric Kitolano (13)
2023	ES	I	3	30	19	4	7	48	33	61	Fourth round					Vegard Erlien (14)
2024	ES	I	13	30	9	6	15	34	44	33	Third round		UCL	Third qualifying round		Lasse Nordås (9)
2025	ES	I	3	30	18	3	9	50	36	57	Third round					Ieltsin Camões (13)

*Also top scorer for the entire league.
