= 1937 in Norwegian football =

Football in Norway
Men's football
- NM: Mjøndalen

Results from Norwegian football in 1937.

== Class A of local association leagues ==
Class A of local association leagues (kretsserier) is the predecessor of a national league competition. In 1937, the leagues were shortened, or not even played because of Norgesserien 1937/38.

| League | Champion |
|---|---|
| Østfold | Selbak |
| Oslo | Lyn |
| Follo | Hølen |
| Aker | Nydalen |
| Vestre Romerike | No championship (only cup) |
| Østre Romerike | Sørumsand |
| Oplandene | Fremad |
| Glåmdal | No championship (only cup) |
| Nord-Østerdal | Tynset |
| Sør-Østerdal | Elverum |
| Gudbrandsdal | No championship (only cup) |
| Valdres | Nordsinni |
| Øvre Buskerud | Geithus |
| Drammen og omegn | Mjøndalen |
| Vestfold | Fram (Larvik) |
| Grenland | Pors |
| Øvre Telemark | Snøgg |
| Aust-Agder | Grane (Arendal) |
| Vest-Agder | Flekkefjord |
| Rogaland | Viking |
| Sunnhordaland | Stord |
| Midthordland | Voss |
| Bergen | No championship (only group play) |
| Sogn og Fjordane | Høyanger |
| Sunnmøre | Rollon |
| Romsdal | Veblungsnes |
| Nordmøre | Kristiansund |
| Sør-Trøndelag | Ranheim |
| Trondhjem | Brage |
| Nord-Trøndelag | Neset |
| Namdal | Namsos |
| Helgeland | Mo |
| Salten | Glimt |
| Lofoten og Vesterålen | Andenes |
| Troms | Tromsø |
| Troms Innland | Skøelv |
| Vest-Finnmark | Stein |
| Midt-Finnmark | Mehamn |
| Aust-Finnmark | Kirkenes |

== Norwegian Cup ==
=== Final ===
17 October 1937

| Mjøndalen | 4–2 | Odd |
|---|---|---|
| Pettersen 5'; Temte 55'; E. Andersen 67', 86' | Report | Forberg 37'; Holmberg 65' |

Urædd Stadion, Porsgrunn
Attendance: 17,000
Referee: Alf Simensen (Sarpsborg)

== Northern Norwegian Cup ==
=== Final ===
| Narvik/Nor | 4–3 | Tromsø |
|---|---|---|
| | Report |

== National team ==
| 14 May 1937 Friendly | Norway | 0–6 | England | Aker, Norway |
| 19:15 (UTC+1); Match 120 | | Report | Kirchen 18'; Holmsen 38' (o.g.); Galley 40'; Steele 43', 61'; Goulden 85' | Stadium: Ullevaal Stadion; Attendance: 20,000; Referee: Einer Ulrich (Denmark) |

| 27 May 1937 Friendly | Norway | 1–3 | Italy | Aker, Norway |
| 19:15 (UTC+1); Match 121 | Danielsen 76' | Report | Meazza 14'; Piola 20', 54' | Stadium: Ullevaal Stadion; Attendance: 27,000; Referee: Alfred Birlem (Germany) |

| 13 June 1937 1937–47 Nordic Championship | Denmark | 5–1 | Norway | Copenhagen, Denmark |
| 19:30 (UTC+1); Match 122 | Kleven 20'; Søbirk 30', 59'; Hansen 64'; Rasmussen 89' | Report | Martinsen 23' | Stadium: Københavns Idrætspark; Attendance: 22,000; Referee: Willy Peters (Germany) |

| 5 September 1937 1937–47 Nordic Championship | Finland | 0–2 | Norway | Helsinki, Finland |
| 12:30 (UTC+1); Match 123 | | Report | Martinsen 21', 53' | Stadium: Töölön Pallokenttä; Attendance: 7,881; Referee: Sölve Flisberg (Sweden) |

| 19 September 1937 1937–47 Nordic Championship | Norway | 3–2 | Sweden | Aker, Norway |
| 13:15 (UTC+1); Match 124 | Brustad 44'; Isaksen 74'; Kvammen 76' | Report | Johansson 55'; Bunke 82' | Stadium: Ullevaal Stadion; Attendance: 29,344; Referee: Arthur W. Barton (England) |

| 10 October 1937 1938 FIFA World Cup qualification | Norway | 3–2 | Irish Free State | Aker, Norway |
| 13:15 (UTC+1); Match 125 | Kvammen 30', 69'; Martinsen 79' | Report | Geoghegan 55'; Dunne 49' | Stadium: Ullevaal Stadion; Attendance: 19,000; Referee: Peco Bauwens (Germany) |

| 24 October 1937 Friendly | Germany | 3–0 | Norway | Berlin, Germany |
| 15:00 (UTC+1); Match 126 | Siffling 19', 29', 67' | Report | | Stadium: Olympiastadion; Attendance: 95,000; Referee: Peter Snape (England) |

| 7 November 1937 1938 FIFA World Cup qualification | Irish Free State | 3–3 | Norway | Dublin, Irish Free State |
| 15:00 (UTC+1); Match 127 | Dunne 10'; O'Flanagan 62'; Duggan 89' | Report | Kvammen 26', 33'; Martinsen 49' | Stadium: Dalymount Park; Attendance: 27,000; Referee: Lionel Gibbs (England) |
