= 1947 in Norwegian football =

Football in Norway
Men's football
- NM: Skeid

Results from Norwegian football in 1947.

== Norwegian Cup ==
=== Final ===
19 October 1947

Skeid	2–0	Viking
Nordahl 30'; Sæthrang 90'	Report

Brann Stadion, Bergen
Attendance: 25,000
Referee: Bjarne Halvorsen (Skiold)

== Northern Norwegian Cup ==
=== Final ===
Mjølner	2–0	Bodø BK
	Report

== National team ==
11 June 1947 Friendly	Norway	3–1	Poland	Aker, Norway
19:00 (UTC+1); Match 152	Brynildsen 48', 63'; Arnesen 53'	Report	Jabłoński 89'	Stadium: Ullevaal Stadion; Attendance: 31,900; Referee: Ludvig Jørkov (Denmark)

26 June 1947 Friendly; SPL 40th Anniversary Tournament; Semi-final	Finland	1–2	Norway	Helsinki, Finland
19:00 (UTC+2); Match 153	Hasso 28'	Report	Karlsen 39' (pen.); Johannessen 85'	Stadium: Helsinki Olympic Stadium; Attendance: 14,806; Referee: Tore Sjöberg (Sweden)

28 June 1947 Friendly; SPL 40th Anniversary Tournament; Final	Norway	1–5	Sweden	Helsinki, Finland
(UTC+2); Match 154	Brynildsen 17'	Report	G. Nordahl 18', 56', 59', 85'; Persson 86'	Stadium: Helsinki Olympic Stadium; Attendance: 24,407; Referee: Johan Alho (Finland)

24 July 1947 Friendly	Iceland	2–4	Norway	Reykjavík, Iceland
20:30 (UTC); Match 155	A. Guðmundsson 4', 38'	Report	Brynildsen 6'; Thoresen 23', 29'; Sæthrang 44'	Stadium: Melavöllur; Attendance: 6,000; Referee: Lionel Gibbs (England)

7 September 1947 1937–47 Nordic Championship	Finland	3–3	Norway	Helsinki, Finland
15:00 (UTC+2); Match 156	Reunanen 14'; Myntti 20', 23'	Report	Dahlen 21'; Sørensen 41'; Brynildsen 88' (pen.)	Stadium: Helsinki Olympic Stadium; Attendance: 13,533; Referee: Valdemar Laursen (Denmark)

21 September 1947 1937–47 Nordic Championship	Norway	3–5	Denmark	Aker, Norway
13:15 (UTC+1); Match 157	Thoresen 35'; Osnes 42' (pen.), 71'	Report	G. Hansen 1' (o.g.); J. W. Hansen 10', 82'; Præst 13', 83'	Stadium: Ullevaal Stadion; Attendance: 34,756; Referee: John Oskar Nilsson (Sweden)

5 October 1947 1937–47 Nordic Championship	Sweden	4–1	Norway	Solna, Sweden
15:00 (UTC+1); Match 158	Liedholm 9'; G. Nordahl 15', 70'; Gren 71'	Report	Kvammen 41'	Stadium: Råsunda Stadium; Attendance: 36,134; Referee: George Reader (England)
