= 1939–40 in Swedish football =

The 1939–40 season in Swedish football, starting August 1939 and ending July 1940:

== Honours ==
=== Official titles ===
Title	Team	Reason
1939–40 Swedish Champions	IF Elfsborg	Winners of Allsvenskan

=== Competitions ===
Level	Competition	Team
1st level	Allsvenskan 1939–40	IF Elfsborg
2nd level	Division 2 Norra 1939–40	Reymersholms IK
2nd level	Division 2 Östra 1939–40	IFK Norrköping
2nd level	Division 2 Västra 1939–40	Degerfors IF
2nd level	Division 2 Södra 1939–40	IS Halmia

== Promotions, relegations and qualifications ==
=== Promotions ===
Promoted from	Promoted to	Team	Reason
Division 2 Östra 1939–40	Allsvenskan 1940–41	IFK Norrköping	Winners of promotion play-off
Division 2 Västra 1939–40	Allsvenskan 1940–41	Degerfors IF	Winners of promotion play-off
Division 3 1939–40	Division 2 Norra 1940–41	Sundbybergs IK	Winners of Östsvenska
Division 3 1939–40	Division 2 Norra 1940–41	Hofors AIF	Winners of promotion play-off
Division 3 1939–40	Division 2 Östra 1940–41	Åtvidabergs FF	2nd team in Mellansvenska
Division 3 1939–40	Division 2 Östra 1940–41	Örebro SK	Winners of promotion play-off
Division 3 1939–40	Division 2 Östra 1940–41	Örebro FF	2nd team in Centralserien, norra
Division 3 1939–40	Division 2 Västra 1940–41	Arvika BK	Winners of Nordvästra
Division 3 1939–40	Division 2 Västra 1940–41	Lundby IF	Winners of promotion play-off
Division 3 1939–40	Division 2 Södra 1940–41	Kalmar AIK	Winners of Sydöstra
Division 3 1939–40	Division 2 Södra 1940–41	IFK Kristianstad	Winners of Sydsvenska

=== League transfers ===
Transferred from	Transferred to	Team	Reason
Division 2 Norra 1939–40	Division 2 Östra 1940–41	IFK Västerås	Geographical composition

=== Relegations ===
Relegated from	Relegated to	Team	Reason
Allsvenskan 1939–40	Division 2 Västra 1940–41	Örgryte IS	11th team
Allsvenskan 1939–40	Division 2 Norra 1940–41	Hammarby IF	12th team
Division 2 Norra 1939–40	Division 3 1940–41	Ljusne AIK	9th team
Division 2 Norra 1939–40	Division 3 1940–41	Enköpings SK	10th team
Division 2 Östra 1939–40	Division 3 1940–41	Skärbläcka IF	Withdrew
Division 2 Östra 1939–40	Division 3 1940–41	IK Tord	9th team
Division 2 Östra 1939–40	Division 3 1940–41	IFK Kumla	10th team
Division 2 Västra 1939–40	Division 3 1940–41	Jonsereds IF	9th team
Division 2 Västra 1939–40	Division 3 1940–41	IF Örnen	10th team
Division 2 Södra 1939–40	Division 3 1940–41	IFK Trelleborg	9th team
Division 2 Södra 1939–40	Division 3 1940–41	Ängelholms IF	10th team

== Domestic results ==
=== Allsvenskan 1939–40 ===

	Team	Pld	W	D	L	GF		GA	GD	Pts
1	IF Elfsborg	22	13	6	3	66	–	31	+35	32
2	IFK Göteborg	22	15	2	5	49	–	27	+22	32
3	Helsingborgs IF	22	12	3	7	49	–	32	+17	27
4	IK Brage	22	10	6	6	42	–	38	+4	26
5	Sandvikens IF	22	10	2	10	38	–	37	+1	22
6	AIK	22	8	5	9	38	–	38	0	21
7	Landskrona BoIS	22	7	7	8	42	–	50	-8	21
8	IK Sleipner	22	8	5	9	33	–	49	-16	21
9	Gårda BK	22	5	10	7	27	–	39	-12	20
10	Malmö FF	22	4	10	8	25	–	28	-3	18
11	Örgryte IS	22	3	8	11	28	–	44	-16	14
12	Hammarby IF	22	3	4	15	34	–	58	-24	10

=== Allsvenskan promotion play-off 1939–40 ===
June 2, 1940

IFK Norrköping	3–2	Reymersholms IK

?, Norrköping
June 9, 1940

Reymersholms IK	3–4	IFK Norrköping

?, Solna

June 2, 1940

IS Halmia	3–3	Degerfors IF

?, Halmstad
June 9, 1940

Degerfors IF	1–0	IS Halmia

?, Degerfors

=== Division 2 Norra 1939–40 ===

	Team	Pld	W	D	L	GF		GA	GD	Pts
1	Reymersholms IK	18	13	2	3	58	–	24	+34	28
2	Djurgårdens IF	18	10	6	2	39	–	17	+22	26
3	Gefle IF	18	10	3	5	47	–	32	+15	23
4	Värtans IK	18	9	3	6	33	–	25	+8	21
5	Ludvika FfI	18	8	5	5	40	–	33	+7	21
6	Nynäshamns IF	18	7	3	8	34	–	43	-9	17
7	Sandvikens AIK	18	7	0	11	30	–	40	-10	14
8	IFK Västerås	18	4	5	9	25	–	41	-16	13
9	Ljusne AIK	18	4	3	11	25	–	39	-14	11
10	Enköpings SK	18	2	2	14	13	–	50	-37	6

=== Division 2 Östra 1939–40 ===
	Team	Pld	W	D	L	GF		GA	GD	Pts
1	IFK Norrköping	18	13	3	2	46	–	15	+31	29
2	Surahammars IF	18	10	6	2	42	–	16	+26	26
3	IFK Eskilstuna	18	10	3	5	46	–	26	+20	23
4	Mjölby AI	18	9	4	5	40	–	32	+8	22
5	Hallstahammars SK	18	10	1	7	39	–	29	+10	21
6	Skärblacka IF	18	6	3	9	32	–	38	-6	15
7	Husqvarna IF	18	6	3	9	25	–	40	-15	15
8	Finspångs AIK	18	5	3	10	36	–	49	-13	13
9	IK Tord	18	5	3	10	28	–	54	-26	13
10	IFK Kumla	18	0	3	15	19	–	54	-35	3

=== Division 2 Västra 1939–40 ===
	Team	Pld	W	D	L	GF		GA	GD	Pts
1	Degerfors IF	18	16	0	2	69	–	14	+55	32
2	Karlskoga IF	18	10	2	6	51	–	26	+25	22
3	GAIS	18	9	3	6	48	–	31	+17	21
4	Skara IF	18	10	1	7	41	–	29	+12	21
5	Varbergs BoIS	18	9	1	8	44	–	33	+11	19
6	Tidaholms GIF	18	8	3	7	33	–	37	-4	19
7	Deje IK	18	6	3	9	32	–	37	-5	15
8	Billingsfors IK	18	7	1	10	28	–	39	-11	15
9	Jonsereds IF	18	4	5	9	34	–	51	-17	13
10	IF Örnen	18	1	1	16	15	–	98	-83	3

=== Division 2 Södra 1939–40 ===
	Team	Pld	W	D	L	GF		GA	GD	Pts
1	IS Halmia	18	13	3	2	57	–	21	+36	29
2	Malmö BI	18	9	5	4	31	–	22	+9	23
3	Halmstads BK	18	8	6	4	37	–	23	+14	22
4	IFK Värnamo	18	10	2	6	34	–	22	+12	22
5	BK Landora	18	9	4	5	42	–	32	+10	22
6	Olofströms IF	18	6	6	6	38	–	45	-7	18
7	IFK Malmö	18	5	5	8	35	–	39	-4	15
8	Höganäs BK	18	3	7	8	24	–	36	-12	13
9	IFK Trelleborg	18	2	7	9	23	–	43	-20	11
10	Ängelholms IF	18	1	3	14	17	–	55	-38	5

=== Division 2 promotion play-off 1939–40 ===
June 9, 1940

Iggesunds IK	5–0	Hofors AIF

?, ?
June 16, 1940

Hofors AIF	2–1	Iggesunds IK

?, ?
June 23, 1940

Hofors AIF	2–0	Iggesunds IK

?, ?

June 2, 1940

IF Rune	4–6	Örebro SK

?, ?
June 9, 1940

Örebro SK	5–1	IF Rune

?, ?

June 2, 1940

Kinna IF	1–3	Lundby IF

?, ?
June 9, 1940

Lundby IF	5–1	Kinna IF

?, ?

== National team results ==
September 17, 1939
1937–47 Nordic Championship
№ 225

Norway	2–3	Sweden
Navestad 8' (p); Yven 84'		Nyberg 19', 73'; Lennartson 81'

Ullevaal, Oslo
Attendance: 29,504
Referee: Ulrich (Denmark)

Sweden: Sven Bergquist - Harry Nilsson, Erik Källström - Gösta Dahl, Arvid Emanuelsson, Karl-Erik Grahn - Arne Nyberg, Knut Johansson, Ragnar Lennartsson, Sven Jonasson, Stig Nyström.

October 1, 1939
1937–47 Nordic Championship
№ 226

Sweden	4–1	Denmark
Lennartson 40'; Johansson 43'; Nyström 58'; Dahl 85'		Jørgensen 8'

Råsunda, Solna
Attendance: 23,354
Referee: Daehlen (Norway)

Sweden: Sven Bergquist - Harry Nilsson, Erik Källström - Gösta Dahl, Arvid Emanuelsson, Karl-Erik Grahn - Arne Nyberg, Knut Johansson, Ragnar Lennartsson, Sven Jonasson, Stig Nyström.

== National team players in season 1939/40 ==
name	pos.	caps	goals	club
Sven "Svenne Berka" Bergquist (Bergqvist)	GK	2	0	Hammarby IF
Gösta Dahl	MF	2	1	IF Elfsborg
Arvid "Emma" Emanuelsson	MF	2	0	IF Elfsborg
Karl-Erik Grahn	MF	2	0	IF Elfsborg
Knut Johansson	FW	2	1	IF Elfsborg
Sven "Jonas" Jonasson	FW	2	0	IF Elfsborg
Erik "Järnbacken" Källström	DF	2	0	IF Elfsborg
Ragnar "Raggen" Lennartsson	FW	2	2	IF Elfsborg
Harry Nilsson	DF	2	0	Landskrona BoIS
Arne Nyberg	FW	2	2	IFK Göteborg
Stig Nyström	FW	2	1	IK Brage
