= List of Finland national football team hat-tricks =

This page is a list of the hat-tricks scored for the Finland national football team. Since Finland's first official international match on 22 October 1911 against Sweden, there have been nine recorded hat-tricks.. The first international hat-trick was scored by Jarl Öhman against Estonia in an international friendly, whom also set the record for most goals scored in a single match by scoring six.

The record for most hat-tricks scored for the Finnish national football team is two, a record held by Mikael Forssell. The team which Finland have scored the most hat-tricks against is San Marino, with a total of four different hat-tricks.

Finland have conceded seventy-seven hat-tricks in total, with Sweden having scored a record twenty-five. Jørgen Juve holds the record for most hat-tricks against Finland, scoring three at the Nordic Football Championships. The most goals scored by an individual in a single game is six, achieved by Wilhelm Hahnemann in an international friendly.

== Hat-tricks scored by Finland ==
Scores and results list Finland's goal tally first.

No.	Player	Date	Opponent	Venue	Goals	Result	Competition	Ref.
1	Jarl Öhman	11 August 1922	Estonia	Töölön Pallokenttä, Helsinki, Finland	6 – (1'. 9', 14' pen, 46', 50', 69')	10–2	Friendly	
2	Lauri Lehtinen	28 September 1930	Sweden	Töölön Pallokenttä, Helsinki, Finland	3 – (9', 40', 41')	4–4	1929–32 Nordic Football Championship	
3	Aatos Lehtonen	18 September 1938	Lithuania	Olympic Stadium, Helsinki, Finland	3 – (30', 56', 75')	3–1	Friendly	
4	Yrjö Kylmälä	4 August 1939	Estonia	Olympic Stadium, Helsinki, Finland	3 – (49', 65', 78')	4–2	Friendly	
5	Mika Lipponen	13 February 1988	Tunisia	National Stadium, Ta' Qali, Malta	3 – (35', 42', 74')	3–0	Friendly	
6	Mixu Paatelainen	14 December 1994	San Marino	Olympic Stadium, Helsinki, Finland	4 – (24', 30', 86', 90')	4–1	UEFA Euro 1996 qualifying	
7	Mikael Forssell	7 September 2005	Macedonia	Tampere Stadium, Tampere, Finland	3 – (11', 13', 62')	5–1	2006 FIFA World Cup qualification	
8	Mikael Forssell (2)	17 November 2010	San Marino	Olympic Stadium, Helsinki, Finland	3 – (51', 59', 78')	8–0	UEFA Euro 2012 qualifying	
9	Daniel Håkans	19 June 2023	San Marino	Olympic Stadium, Helsinki, Finland	3 – (64', 72', 74')	6–0	UEFA Euro 2024 qualifying	
10	Adrian Svanbäck	15 November 2026	San Marino	Töölö Football Stadium, Helsinki, Finland	3 – (8', 20', 78')	7–2	2026–27 UEFA Nations League C	

== Hat-tricks conceded by Finland ==
Scores and results list Finland's goal tally first.

No.	Player	Date	Opponent	Venue	Goals	Result	Competition	Ref.
1	Hjalmar Lorichs	27 June 2012	Sweden	Råsunda IP, Solna, Sweden	3 – (11', 50', 65')	1–7	Friendly	
2	Jan Vos	4 July 2012	Netherlands	Råsunda IP, Solna, Sweden	5 – (29', 43', 46', 74', 78')	0–9	1912 Summer Olympics	
3	Gunnar Paulsson	20 June 1923	Sweden	Strömvallen, Gävle, Sweden	3 – (31', 48', 64')	4–5	Friendly	
4	Zeki Rıza Sporel	17 June 1924	Finland	Töölön Pallokenttä, Helsinki, Finland	4 – (3', 15', 37', 87')	2–4	Friendly	
5	Putte Kock	28 July 1924	Sweden	Töölön Pallokenttä, Helsinki, Finland	3 – (35', 77', 84' pen)	5–7	Friendly	
6	Filip Johansson	9 June 1925	Sweden	Slottsskogsvallen, Gothenburg, Sweden	4 – (8', 23', 72' pen, 85')	0–4	Friendly	
7	Paul Pömpner	26 June 1925	Germany	Töölön Pallokenttä, Helsinki, Finland	3 – (52', 71', 79')	3–5	Friendly	
8	Einar Gundersen	6 June 1926	Norway	Töölön Pallokenttä, Helsinki, Finland	3 – (13', 75', 89')	2–5	Friendly	
9	Wawrzyniec Staliński	8 August 1926	Poland	Warta Poznań Stadium, Poznań, Poland	3 – (9', 60', 72')	1–7	Friendly	
10	Mieczysław Batsch	8 August 1926	Poland	Warta Poznań Stadium, Poznań, Poland	4 – (33' pen, 44', 77', 90')	1–7	Friendly	
11	Jørgen Juve	18 June 1929	Norway	Ullevaal Stadion, Oslo, Norway	3 – (8', 15', 73')	0–4	1929–32 Nordic Football Championship	
12	Pauli Jørgensen	13 October 1929	Denmark	Idrætsparken, Copenhagen, Denmark	3 – (11', 41', 73')	0–8	1929–32 Nordic Football Championship	
13	Jørgen Juve (2)	1 June 1930	Norway	Ullevaal Stadion, Oslo, Norway	3 – (17', 42', 66')	2–6	1929–32 Nordic Football Championship	
14	Bertil Karlsson	28 September 1930	Sweden	Töölön Pallokenttä, Helsinki, Finland	3 – (26', 53', 64')	4–4	1929–32 Nordic Football Championship	
15	Sune Zetterberg	3 July 1931	Sweden	Olympic Stadium, Stockholm, Sweden	4 – (18', 25', 30', 55')	2–8	1929–32 Nordic Football Championship	
16	Evert Hansson	3 July 1931	Sweden	Olympic Stadium, Stockholm, Sweden	3 – (35', 65', 73')	2–8	1929–32 Nordic Football Championship	
17	Sven Rydell	16 May 1932	Sweden	Råsunda IP, Solna, Sweden	3 – (12', 20', 62')	1–7	Friendly	
18	Richard Hofmann	1 July 1932	Germany	Töölön Pallokenttä, Helsinki, Finland	3 – (5', 80', 81')	1–4	Friendly	
19	Jørgen Juve (3)	3 September 1933	Norway	Töölön Pallokenttä, Helsinki, Finland	3 – (20', 36', 46')	1–5	1933–36 Nordic Football Championship	
20	Erik Persson	23 September 1934	Sweden	Töölön Pallokenttä, Helsinki, Finland	3 – (6', 42', 87')	4–5	1933–36 Nordic Football Championship	
21	Ernst Lehner	18 August 1935	Germany	Heinrich-Zisch-Stadion, Munich, Germany	3 – (3', 30', 56')	0–6	Friendly	
22	Edmund Conen	18 August 1935	Germany	Heinrich-Zisch-Stadion, Munich, Germany	3 – (43', 46', 75')	0–6	Friendly	
23	Odd Hoel	8 September 1935	Norway	Töölön Pallokenttä, Helsinki, Finland	3 – (23', 52', 62')	1–5	1933–36 Nordic Football Championship	
24	Teodoro Fernández	6 August 1936	Peru	Stadion am Gesundbrunnen, Berlin, Germany	5 – (18', 35', 47', 49', 70')	3–7	1936 Summer Olympics	
25	Arne Brustad	17 June 1938	Norway	Ullevaal Stadion, Oslo, Norway	4 – (11', 22', 25', 33')	0–9	1937–47 Nordic Football Championship	
26	Erik Persson (2)	9 June 1939	Sweden	Råsunda Stadium, Solna, Sweden	3 – (30', 64', 67')	1–5	1937–47 Nordic Football Championship	
27	Silvio Piola	20 July 1939	Italy	Olympic Stadium, Helsinki, Finland	3 – (12'. 28', 84')	2–3	Friendly	
28	Oskar Theisen	17 September 1939	Denmark	Idrætsparken, Copenhagen, Denmark	3 – (37', 58', 88')	1–8	1937–47 Nordic Football Championship	
29	Knut Johansson	29 August 1940	Sweden	Olympic Stadium, Helsinki, Finland	3 – (13', 34', 85')	2–3	Friendly	
30	Wilhelm Hahnemann	1 September 1940	Germany	Probstheidaer Stadion, Leipzig, Germany	6 – (7', 19', 28', 44', 49', 82')	0–13	Friendly	
31	Edmund Conen (2)	1 September 1940	Germany	Probstheidaer Stadion, Leipzig, Germany	4 – (8', 16', 32', 47')	0–13	Friendly	
32	Knut Johansson (2)	22 September 1940	Sweden	Råsunda Stadium, Solna, Sweden	3 – (58', 59', 74')	0–5	Friendly	
33	Hermann Eppenhoff	5 October 1941	Germany	Olympic Stadium, Helsinki, Finland	3 – (28', 58', 63')	0–6	Friendly	
34	Ernst Wilimowski	5 October 1941	Germany	Olympic Stadium, Helsinki, Finland	3 – (43', 70', 83')	0–6	Friendly	
35	Gunnar Gren	26 August 1945	Sweden	Gamla Ullevi, Gothenburg, Sweden	3 – (8', 60', 77')	2–7	Friendly	
35	Börje Tapper	30 September 1945	Sweden	Olympic Stadium, Helsinki, Finland	5 – (36', 59', 81', 82', 88')	1–6	Friendly	
36	Gunnar Thoresen	28 June 1946	Norway	Brann Stadion, Bergen, Norway	3 – (15', 20', 62')	0–12	Friendly	
37	Paul Sæthrang	28 June 1946	Norway	Brann Stadion, Bergen, Norway	3 – (18', 31', 69')	0–12	Friendly	
38	Gustaf Nilsson	15 September 1946	Sweden	Olympic Stadium, Helsinki, Finland	3 – (1', 49', 53')	0–7	Friendly	
39	Gunnar Nordahl	24 August 1947	Sweden	Ryavallen, Borås, Sweden	3 – (5', 30', 40')	0–7	1937–47 Nordic Football Championship	
40	Egon Jönsson	2 October 1949	Sweden	Malmö IP, Malmö, Sweden	3 – (7', 9', 17')	1–8	1948–51 Nordic Football Championship	
41	Ingvar Rydell	2 October 1949	Sweden	Malmö IP, Malmö, Sweden	3 – (24', 75', 83')	1–8	1948–51 Nordic Football Championship	
42	Noud van Melis	27 October 1951	Netherlands	De Kuip, Rotterdam, Netherlands	3 – (43', 78', 87')	4–4	Friendly	
43	Nándor Hidegkuti	18 November 1951	Hungary	Megyeri úti Stadion, Budapest, Hungary	3 – (9', 28', 85')	0–8	Friendly	
44	Sándor Kocsis	22 June 1952	Hungary	Olympic Stadium, Helsinki, Finland	3 – (49', 80', 84')	1–6	Friendly	
45	Kjell Kristiansen	31 August 1952	Norway	Ullevaal Stadion, Oslo, Norway	3 – (36', 47', 75')	2–7	1952–55 Nordic Football Championship	
46	Lars Råberg	21 September 1952	Sweden	Olympic Stadium, Helsinki, Finland	3 – (10', 48', 58')	1–8	1952–55 Nordic Football Championship	
47	Hasse Persson	21 September 1952	Sweden	Olympic Stadium, Helsinki, Finland	3 – (24', 50', 83')	1–8	1952–55 Nordic Football Championship	
48	Henri Coppens	25 May 1953	Belgium	Olympic Stadium, Helsinki, Finland	3 – (7', 25', 79')	2–4	1954 FIFA World Cup qualification	
49	Birger Eklund	15 August 1954	Sweden	Olympic Stadium, Helsinki, Finland	3 – (7', 30', 48')	1–10	1952–55 Nordic Football Championship	
50	Kurt Hamrin	15 August 1954	Sweden	Olympic Stadium, Helsinki, Finland	3 – (6', 71', 80')	1–10	1952–55 Nordic Football Championship	
51	Péter Palotás	19 May 1955}	Hungary	Olympic Stadium, Helsinki, Finland	3 – (7', 12', 43')	1–9	Friendly	
52	Joško Vidošević	13 November 1955	Yugoslavia	Split, Croatia	4	0–8	Friendly	
53	Tihomir Markovic	13 November 1955	Yugoslavia	Split, Croatia	3	0–8	Friendly	
54	Henry Källgren	19 June 1957	Sweden	Olympic Stadium, Helsinki, Finland	3 – (28', 109', 112')	1–5	Friendly	
55	Nikita Simonyan	15 August 1957	Soviet Union	Olympic Stadium, Helsinki, Finland	3 – (9', 13', 31')	0–10	1958 FIFA World Cup qualification	
56	Gunnar Gren (2)	22 September 1957	Sweden	Råsunda Stadium, Solna, Sweden	3 – (18', 50', 77')	1–5	1956–59 Nordic Football Championship	
57	Torbjörn Jonsson	20 August 1958	Sweden	Olympic Stadium, Helsinki, Finland	3 – (38', 50', 69')	1–7	1956–59 Nordic Football Championship	
58	Harald Nielsen	4 October 1959	Denmark	Idrætsparken, Copenhagen, Denmark	3 – (20', 22', 59')	0–4	Friendly	
59	Ernest Pohl	8 November 1959	Poland	Chorzów, Poland	3 – (14', 19', 44')	2–6	1960 Summer Olympics qualification	
60	Jørn Sørensen	15 October 1961	Denmark	Idrætsparken, Copenhagen, Denmark	3 – (6', 52', 85')	1–9	1960–63 Nordic Football Championship	
61	Włodzimierz Lubański	24 October 1965	Poland	Florian Krygier Stadium, Szczecin, Poland	4 – (19', 21', 24', 41')	0–7	1966 FIFA World Cup qualification	
62	Slaven Zambata	25 September 1968	Yugoslavia	JNA Stadium, Belgrade, Serbia	3 – (9', 73', 87')	1–9	1970 FIFA World Cup qualification	
63	Vahidin Musemić	25 September 1968	Yugoslavia	JNA Stadium, Belgrade, Serbia	3 – (39', 57', 89')	1–9	1970 FIFA World Cup qualification	
64	Odilon Polleunis	9 October 1968	Belgium	Regenboogstadion, Waregem, Belgium	3 – (29', 39', 63')	1–6	1970 FIFA World Cup qualification	
65	Bent Jensen	10 September 1969	Denmark	Idrætsparken, Copenhagen, Denmark	3 – (12', 14', 43')	2–5	1968–71 Nordic Football Championship	
66	Willy van der Kuijlen	3 September 1975	Netherlands	Goffertstadion, Nijmegen, Netherlands	3 – (29', 35', 55')	1–4	UEFA Euro 1976 qualifying	
67	Roberto Bettega	15 October 1977	Italy	Stadio Olimpico Grande Torino, Turin, Italy	4 – (29', 38', 59', 62')	1–6	1978 FIFA World Cup qualification	
68	Oleg Blokhin	5 April 1978	Soviet Union	Hrazdan Stadium, Yerevan, Armenia	3 – (42', 59', 84' pen)	2–10	Friendly	
69	Thomas Mavros	11 October 1978	Greece	Leoforos Alexandras Stadium, Athens, Greece	3 – (38', 44', 75' pen)	1–8	UEFA Euro 1980 qualifying	
70	Pål Jacobsen	21 August 1980	Norway	Ullevaal Stadion, Oslo, Norway	4 – (30', 39', 72'. 84')	1–6	1978–80 Nordic Football Championship	
71	Karl-Heinz Rummenigge	23 September 1981	West Germany	Ruhrstadion, Bochum, Germany	3 – (42', 60', 72')	1–7	1982 FIFA World Cup qualification	
72	Natipong Sritong-In	16 February 1996	Thailand	Rajamangala Stadium, Bangkok, Thailand	3 – (40', 51', 83')	2–5	1996 King's Cup	
73	Anurak Srikerd	27 February 2000	Thailand	Rajamangala Stadium, Bangkok, Thailand	3 – (22', 44', 81')	1–5	2000 King's Cup	
74	Miroslav Klose	10 September 2008	Germany	Olympic Stadium, Helsinki, Finland	3 – (38', 45', 83')	3–3	2010 FIFA World Cup qualification	
75	Zlatan Ibrahimović	7 June 2011	Sweden	Råsunda Stadium, Solna, Sweden	3 – (31', 35', 53')	0–5	UEFA Euro 2012 qualifying	
76	Kamil Grosicki	7 October 2020	Poland	Gdańsk Stadium, Gdańsk, Poland	3 – (9', 18', 38')	1–5	Friendly	
77	Rasmus Højlund	23 March 2023	Denmark	Parken Stadium, Copenhagen, Denmark	3 – (21', 82', 93')	1–3	UEFA Euro 2024 qualifying	
