= 1936 in Norwegian football =

Football in Norway
Men's football
- NM: Fredrikstad

== Class A of local association leagues ==
Class A of local association leagues (kretsserier) is the predecessor of a national league competition.

| League | Champion |
|---|---|
| Østfold | Fredrikstad |
| Oslo | Lyn |
| Follo | Hølen |
| Aker | Nydalen |
| Vestre Romerike | Lillestrøm |
| Østre Romerike | Sørumsand |
| Oplandene | Vardal |
| Glåmdal | Grue |
| Nord-Østerdal | Tynset |
| Sør-Østerdal | Elverum |
| Gudbrandsdal | Otta |
| Valdres | Nordsinni |
| Øvre Buskerud | Geithus |
| Drammen og omegn | Mjøndalen |
| Vestfold | Fram (Larvik) |
| Grenland | Odd |
| Øvre Telemark | Snøgg |
| Aust-Agder | Grane (Arendal) |
| Vest-Agder | Donn |
| Rogaland | Viking |
| Sunnhordaland | Stord |
| Midthordland | Voss |
| Bergen | Hardy |
| Sogn og Fjordane | Florø-Varg |
| Sunnmøre | Aalesund |
| Romsdal | Veblungsnes |
| Nordmøre | Clausenengen |
| Sør-Trøndelag | Ranheim |
| Trondhjem | Brage |
| Nord-Trøndelag | Neset |
| Namdal | Namsos |
| Helgeland | Mo |
| Salten | Glimt |
| Lofoten og Vesterålen | Svolvær |
| Troms | Tromsø |
| Troms Innland | Skøelv |
| Vest-Finnmark | Alta |
| Midt-Finnmark | Honningsvåg |
| Aust-Finnmark | Kirkenes |

== Norwegian Cup ==
=== Bracket ===
Fourth Round
Fredrikstad | 2
Skiold | 0
Ranheim | 1
Odd | 3
Pors | 1
Selbak | 0
Fram | 2
Lisleby | 3
Hardy | 1
Vålerengen | 2
Mjøndalen | 1
Aalesund | 0
Lyn | 2
Moss | 3
Sarpsborg | 8
Ørn | 1

Quarter-finals
Odd | 1
Fredrikstad | 3
Lisleby | 6
Pors | 1
Vålerengen | 0
Mjøndalen | 1
Moss | 2
Sarpsborg | 1

Semi-finals
Fredrikstad | 2
Lisleby | 1
Mjøndalen | 3
Moss | 2

Final
Fredrikstad | 2
Mjøndalen | 0

=== Final ===
25 October 1936

| Fredrikstad | 2–0 | Mjøndalen |
|---|---|---|
| Brynildsen 43', 89' | Report |

Ullevaal Stadion, Oslo
Attendance: 20,000
Referee: Kåre Gunnar Kinn (Eidsvold IF)

== Northern Norwegian Cup ==
=== Final ===
| Fløya | 2–2 | Narvik/Nor |
|---|---|---|
| | Report |

Replay

| Fløya | 1–0 | Narvik/Nor |
|---|---|---|
| | Report |

== National team ==
| 18 June 1936 Friendly | Norway | 1–2 | Switzerland | Aker, Norway |
| 19:30 (UTC+1); Match 110 | Hansen 7' | Report | Abegglen 38', 70' | Stadium: Ullevaal Stadion; Attendance: 15,000; Referee: Otto Ohlsson (Sweden) |

| 5 July 1936 1933–36 Nordic Championship | Sweden | 2–0 | Norway | Gothenburg, Sweden |
| 13:00 (UTC+1); Match 111 | Jonasson 25', 36' | Report | | Stadium: Ullevi; Attendance: 21,133; Referee: Louis Baert (Belgium) |

| 26 July 1936 Friendly | Sweden | 3–4 | Norway | Stockholm, Sweden |
| 18:30 (UTC+1); Match 112 | Persson 15', 66'; Jonasson 88' (pen.) | Report | Kvammen 17' (pen.), 43', 65'; Isaksen 29' | Stadium: Olympic Stadium; Attendance: 20,000; Referee: Karl Weingärtner (Germany) |

| 3 August 1936 1936 Summer Olympics; First round | Norway | 4–0 | Turkey | Berlin, Germany |
| 17:30 (UTC+1); Match 113 | Martinsen 30', 70'; Brustad 53'; Kvammen 80' | Report | | Stadium: Mommsenstadion; Attendance: 8,000; Referee: Giuseppe Scarpi (Italy) |

| 7 August 1936 1936 Summer Olympics; Quarter-final | Germany | 0–2 | Norway | Berlin, Germany |
| 17:30 (UTC+1); Match 114 | | Report | Isaksen 7', 83' | Stadium: Poststadion; Attendance: 35,000; Referee: Arthur Barton (England) |

| 10 August 1936 1936 Summer Olympics; Semi-finals | Italy | 2–1 | Norway | Berlin, Germany |
| 17:00 (UTC+1); Match 115 | Negro 15'; Frossi 96' | Report | Brustad 58' | Stadium: Olympiastadion; Attendance: 95,000; Referee: Hertzka Pál (Hungary) |

| 13 August 1936 1936 Summer Olympics; Bronze medal match | Norway | 3–2 | Poland | Berlin, Germany |
| 16:00 (UTC+1); Match 116 | Brustad 15', 21', 84' | Report | Wodarz 5'; Peterek 24' | Stadium: Olympiastadion; Attendance: 95,000; Referee: Alfred Birlem (Germany) |

| 6 September 1936 1933–36 Nordic Championship | Norway | 0–2 | Finland | Aker, Norway |
| 13:15 (UTC+1); Match 117 | | Report | Weckström 3'; Lehtonen 48' | Stadium: Ullevaal Stadion; Attendance: 17,000; Referee: Otto Remke (Denmark) |

| 20 September 1936 1933–36 Nordic Championship | Norway | 3–3 | Denmark | Aker, Norway |
| 13:15 (UTC+1); Match 118 | Brustad 8'; Frantzen 11', 78' | Report | Søbirk 14', 67'; Jørgensen 49' | Stadium: Ullevaal Stadion; Attendance: 29,000; Referee: Karl Weingärtner (Germany) |

| 1 November 1936 Friendly | Netherlands | 3–3 | Norway | Amsterdam, Netherlands |
| 14:30 (UTC+00:20); Match 119 | Bakhuys 46'; Smit 53'; de Bock 88' | Report | Martinsen 32'; Brustad 72', 79' | Stadium: Olympic Stadium; Attendance: 30,000; Referee: Alfred Birlem (Germany) |
