= 1939 Norwegian Football Cup =

Norgesmesterskapet i fotball for menn 1939

Tournament details
- Country: Norway
- Teams: 128 (main competition)

Final positions
- Champions: Sarpsborg (3rd title)
- Runners-up: Skeid

The 1939 Norwegian Football Cup was the 38th season of the Norwegian annual knockout football tournament. The tournament was open for all members of NFF, except those from Northern Norway. This final is the only final held in Tønsberg and was played at Tønsberg Gressbane on 15 October 1939. In the final, two-time former winners Sarpsborg won 2–1 against Skeid, who played their first final, and secured their third title. Fredrikstad were the defending champions, but were eliminated by Sarpsborg in the semifinal.

== First round ==
Team 1	Score	Team 2
Borg	1–2	Selbak
Braatt	1–1 (a.e.t.)	Rollon
Brage	3–1	Orkanger
Briskebyen	1–0	Lisleby
Djerv	4–0	Ulf
Djerv 1919	4–3 (a.e.t.)	Brann
Eidsvold IF	3–0	Askim
Fram (Larvik)	1–2	Skotfoss
Freidig	0–4	Ranheim
Geithus	4–2 (a.e.t.)	Berger
Gjøa	5–0	Gresvik
Lyn (Gjøvik)	9–2	Elverum
Grane	1–3	Larvik Turn
Greåker	1–2	Lillestrøm
Holmestrand	0–6	Frigg
Jarl	4–1	Brodd
Kapp	4–2	Vålerengen
Kvik (Halden)	2–5	Kjelsås
Liv	1–4	Storm
Lyn	8–0	Kløfta
Mjøndalen	5–0	Voss
Moss	2–0	Haga
National	3–1	Sverre
Neset	2–1	Kvik (Trondheim)
Nydalen	1–3	Gleng
Pallas	4–0	Fjellkameratene
Raufoss	0–2	Drafn
Sandefjord BK	1–1 (a.e.t.)	Kongsberg
Sarpsborg	6–0	Eiker
Skiens BK	1–3	Flekkefjord
Skiens-Grane	6–0	Fjell
Skiold	3–1 (a.e.t.)	Vardal
Skreia	0–13	Jevnaker
Snøgg	2–1	Urædd
Start	1–4	Odd
Strong	2–1	Tistedalen
Strømsgodset	1–0	Donn
Torp	5–1	Roy
Træff	0–1	Clausenengen
Tønsberg Turn	3–2	Lynild
Veblungsnes	1–3	Fremad Lillehammer
Verdal	2–4	Steinkjer
Vigør	3–0	Solberg
Vikersund	4–2	Pors
Viking	3–0	Viggo
Aalesund	8–0	Nordlandet
Ålgård	4–0	Egersund
Årstad	0–6	Vard
Replay
Kongsberg	10–0	Sandefjord BK
Rollon	6–1	Braatt

- Fredrikstad, Skeid, Hamar, Ørn, Stavanger, Hardy, Kristiansund and Rosenborg had a walkover.

== Second round ==
Team 1	Score	Team 2
Clausenengen	4–0	National
Drafn	4–1	Vikersund
Eidsvold IF	0–5	Sarpsborg
Flekkefjord	1–2	Ålgård
Fremad Lillehammer	1–3 (a.e.t.)	Gjøa
Frigg	9–0	Kapp
Lyn (Gjøvik)	3–0	Aalesund
Gleng	4–1	Skiold
Hamar	4–0	Strong
Jevnaker	3–5	Djerv
Kjelsås	0–1	Torp
Kongsberg	0–2	Lyn
Larvik Turn	2–3	Moss
Lillestrøm	1–1 (a.e.t.)	Briskebyen
Odd	3–1	Geithus
Ranheim	2–3 (a.e.t.)	Kristiansund
Rollon	3–3 (a.e.t.)	Brage
Selbak	2–4	Tønsberg Turn
Skotfoss	0–4	Mjøndalen
Stavanger	5–1	Pallas
Steinkjer	3–1	Neset
Storm	4–1	Strømsgodset
Vard	1–2	Jarl
Vigør	2–0	Skiens-Grane
Viking	8–0	Djerv 1919
Ørn	3–2	Snøgg
Replay
Brage	5–2	Rollon
Briskebyen	0–3	Lillestrøm

- Fredrikstad, Skeid, Hardy and Rosenborg had a walkover.

== Third round ==
Team 1	Score	Team 2
Ålgård	3–0	Storm
Brage	3–2	Hamar
Lillestrøm	6–1	Clausenengen
Djerv	1–4	Viking
Tønsberg Turn	1–4	Drafn
Sarpsborg	1–0	Frigg
Gjøa	4–2	Hardy
Mjøndalen	6–1	Gleng
Jarl	3–2 (a.e.t.)	Stavanger
Kristiansund	4–2	Steinkjer
Moss	5–1	Lyn (Gjøvik)
Lyn	7–1	Vigør
Rosenborg	0–3	Odd
Torp	2–1	Ørn

- Fredrikstad and Skeid had a walkover.

== Fourth round ==
Team 1	Score	Team 2
Drafn	6–3	Ålgård
Brage	0–5	Lyn
Kristiansund	1–2	Fredrikstad
Odd	1–2	Gjøa
Sarpsborg	5–0	Jarl
Moss	4–1	Lillestrøm
Viking	1–3	Mjøndalen
Skeid	7–2	Torp

== Quarter-finals ==
Team 1	Score	Team 2
Moss	0–1	Drafn
Lyn	1–2 (a.e.t.)	Fredrikstad
Gjøa	0–2	Skeid
Mjøndalen	1–4	Sarpsborg

== Semi-finals ==
Team 1	Score	Team 2
Drafn	2–3 (a.e.t.)	Skeid
Fredrikstad	3–4	Sarpsborg

== Final ==
15 October 1939

Sarpsborg	2–1	Skeid
Yven 30'; Navestad 88'	Report	Borgen 24'

Tønsberg Gressbane, Tønsberg
Attendance: 8,000
Referee: Gullik Hagajore (Tønsberg Turn)

== See also ==
- 1938–39 League of Norway
- 1939 in Norwegian football
