= Holger Granström =

Finnish ice hockey player (1917-1941)

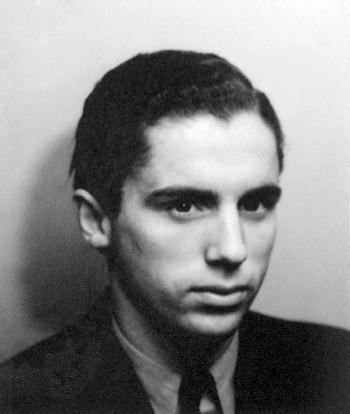

Personal information
- Full name: Holger Granström
- Date of birth: 25 December 1917
- Place of birth: Helsinki, Finland
- Date of death: 22 July 1941 (aged 23)
- Position: Forward

International career
Years	Team	Apps	(Gls)
1938–1940	Finland	12	(2)

Holger Granström (25 December 1917 in Ruokolahti, Finland – 22 July 1941) was a professional ice hockey player who played in the SM-liiga. He played for KIF. He was inducted into the Finnish Hockey Hall of Fame in 1985. He also played for the Finland national football team. He was killed in the Continuation War.

== Hockey career ==
In 1935, he began his career at KIF in the Finnish Championships.

== Football career ==
He played in 12 matches for the Finland national football team from 1938 to 1940, scoring 2 goals, both of them coming in the 1937–47 Nordic Football Championship. He was

=== International goals ===
No.	Date	Venue	Opponent	Score	Result	Competition
1.	4 July 1938	Helsinki Olympic Stadium, Helsinki, Finland	Sweden	2–1	2–4	1937–47 Nordic Football Championship
2.	17 September 1939	Idrætsparken, Copenhagen, Denmark	Denmark	1–5	1–8	1937–47 Nordic Football Championship
