= Henri Myntti =

Finnish footballer (born 1982)

Personal information
- Date of birth: 23 March 1982 (age 44)
- Place of birth: Kokkola, Finland
- Height: 1.99 m (6 ft 6 in)
- Positions: Central defender; striker

Youth career
- 1999–2000: KPV

Senior career*
Years	Team	Apps	(Gls)
2001–2004	Tromsø	6	(0)
2002	→ Hämeenlinna (loan)	10	(0)
2003	→ Jaro (loan)	24	(2)
2004–2006	KPV	60	(17)
2007–2008	TamU	41	(15)
2009	Hansa Rostock	8	(1)
2010–2011	TamU	24	(6)
2011–2018	KPV	168	(52)
Total		341	(93)

International career^{‡}
	Finland U21	12	(1)
- * Club domestic league appearances and goals as of 23 May 2024 ‡ National team caps and goals as of 1 September 2008

Henri Myntti (born 23 March 1982) is a Finnish retired footballer. Since his retirement, he has been a chairman of KPV.

== Club career ==
Born in Kokkola, Myntti began his career at his hometown Kokkola's top club KPV. In March 2001 he was signed as a promising youth player by the Norwegian Tippeligaen side Tromsø IL. Failing to secure a place in the Tromsø squad, he was loaned out twice during his stay at the club. In 2002, he joined FC Hämeenlinna in mid-season to make his Veikkausliiga debut. In 2003, he played the whole season at another Veikkausliiga side, FF Jaro of Jakobstad. In July 2004 his contract with Tromsø was terminated.

After leaving Norway, Myntti returned home to play for KPV in the Finnish second tier Ykkönen. After a successful spell at KPV, he was signed by the defending Finnish champions Tampere United for the 2007 season. He won the league title with Tampere as well as the Finnish Cup in 2007.

After a disappointing early season for Tampere United in 2008, the manager Ari Hjelm decided to try Myntti out as a striker. He has since emerged as one of the most prolific goalscorers in Veikkausliiga. In the 2008 season, Myntti won the title of top scorer in the Veikkausliiga.

In January 2009, it was announced that he would transfer to Hansa Rostock. Myntti scored his first goal for the Rostock side on 6 March 2009 against FC St. Pauli. Even though his team got an early lead, the Hamburger won the match 2–3. After the season, he was suspended from the club. After struggling to make a further impact, he was released from his contract by mutual consent on 11 November 2009. On 22 December 2009, he signed a two-year contract with Tampere United.

=== Position ===
He is a tall central defender who can also play as striker.

== International career ==
Myntti was capped 12 times for the Finland national under-21 team. He also has caps at other youth levels.

== Personal life ==
Myntti's grandfather, Stig-Göran Myntti, was a regular member of the Finland national team in the 1940s and 1950s. His father was also capped at youth level.

== Career statistics ==
As of 1 September 2024.

Appearances and goals by club, season and competition
Club	Season	League			Cup (Note: Includes Suomen Cup)		League cup		Europe		Total	
Club	Season	Division	Apps	Goals	Apps	Goals	Apps	Goals	Apps	Goals	Apps	Goals
KPV	1999	Kakkonen										
KPV	2000	Kakkonen										
KPV	Total		38	4	0	0	0	0	0	0	38	4
Jaro	2001	Ykkönen	23	5	–		–		–		23	5
Tromsø	2001	Tippeligaen	2	0	1	0	–		–		3	0
Tromsø	2002	1. divisjon	4	0	1	0	–		–		5	0
Tromsø	Total		6	0	2	0	0	0	0	0	8	0
Hämeenlinna (loan)	2002	Veikkausliiga	10	0	–		–		–		10	0
Jaro (loan)	2003	Veikkausliiga	24	2	–		–		–		24	2
KPV	2004	Kakkonen										
KPV	2005	Ykkönen										
KPV	2006	Ykkönen										
KPV	Total		60	17	0	0	0	0	0	0	60	17
Tampere United	2007	Veikkausliiga	18	2	1	1	–		3 (Note: Appearances in UEFA Champions League and UEFA Cup)	0	22	3
Tampere United	2008	Veikkausliiga	23	13	1	0	–		4 (Note: Appearances in UEFA Champions League)	1	28	14
Tampere United	Total		41	15	2	1	0	0	7	1	50	17
Hansa Rostock	2008–09	2. Bundesliga	8	1	–		–		–		8	1
Tampere United	2010	Veikkausliiga	24	6	–		–		–		24	6
Tampere United	2011	Veikkausliiga	0	0	0	0	1	1	–		1	1
Tampere United	Total		24	6	0	0	1	1	0	0	25	7
KPV	2012	Kakkonen	26	11	2	0	–		–		28	11
KPV	2013	Kakkonen	24	16	–		–		–		24	16
KPV	2014	Kakkonen	25	8	1	0	–		–		26	8
KPV	2015	Kakkonen	28	10	4	2	–		–		32	12
KPV	2016	Ykkönen	24	4	3	1	–		–		27	5
KPV	2017	Ykkönen	20	3	5	2	–		–		25	5
KPV	2018	Ykkönen	21	0	2	0	–		–		23	0
KPV	Total		168	52	17	5	0	0	0	0	185	57
Career total			402	104	19	6	1	1	7	1	431	104

== Honours ==
- Finnish Championship: 2007
- Finnish Cup: 2007
- Top scorer in Veikkausliiga: 2008
