= Knud Andersen (footballer, born 1917) =

Danish footballer (1917–2003)

Personal information
- Full name: Knud Mogens Hans Myglegård Andersen
- Date of birth: 11 April 1917
- Place of birth: Østerbro, Denmark
- Date of death: 7 April 2003 (aged 85)
- Position: Forward

International career
Years	Team	Apps	(Gls)
1937	Denmark	3	(2)

Knud Andersen (11 April 1917 – 7 April 2003) was a Danish footballer. He played in three matches for the Denmark national football team in 1937.
