= Alf Simensen =

Norwegian footballer (1896-1983)

Personal information
- Date of birth: 9 December 1896
- Date of death: 4 December 1983 (aged 86)

International career
Years	Team	Apps	(Gls)
1918–1926	Norway	3	(0)

Alf Simensen (9 December 1896 – 4 December 1983) was a Norwegian footballer. He played in three matches for the Norway national football team from 1918 to 1926.
