= Knut Johansson (footballer, born 1918) =

Swedish footballer

Personal information
- Full name: Knut Alfred Johansson
- Date of birth: 2 April 1918
- Place of birth: Seglora, Sweden
- Date of death: 2 March 2001 (aged 82)
- Place of death: Vänersborg, Sweden
- Position: Forward

Senior career*
Years	Team	Apps	(Gls)
- Elfsborg
1944–1946	Helsingborg	28	(11)

International career
1939–1943	Sweden	9	(8)
- * Club domestic league appearances and goals

Knut Alfred Johansson (2 April 1918 – 2 March 2001) was a Swedish footballer who played for Elfsborg and Helsingborg. He featured nine times for the Sweden men's national football team between 1939 and 1943, scoring eight goals.

== Career statistics ==
=== Club ===
Appearances and goals by club, season and competition
Club	Season	League			Cup		Other		Total	
Club	Season	Division	Apps	Goals	Apps	Goals	Apps	Goals	Apps	Goals
Helsingborg	1944–45	Allsvenskan	15	4	0	0	0	0	15	4
Helsingborg	1945–46	Allsvenskan	13	7	0	0	0	0	13	7
Career total			28	11	0	0	0	0	28	11

=== International ===
Appearances and goals by national team and year
National team	Year	Apps	Goals
Sweden	1939	3	1
Sweden	1940	4	6
Sweden	1942	1	0
Sweden	1943	1	1
Total		9	8

=== International goals ===
Scores and results list Sweden's goal tally first.

No	Date	Venue	Opponent	Score	Result	Competition
1.	1 October 1939	Råsunda Stadium, Solna, Sweden	Denmark	2–1	4–1	1937–47 Nordic Football Championship
2.	29 August 1940	Helsinki Olympic Stadium, Helsinki, Finland	Finland	1–0	3–2	Friendly
3.	29 August 1940	Helsinki Olympic Stadium, Helsinki, Finland	Finland	2–1	3–2	Friendly
4.	29 August 1940	Helsinki Olympic Stadium, Helsinki, Finland	Finland	3–2	3–2	Friendly
5.	22 September 1940	Råsunda Stadium, Solna, Sweden	Finland	2–0	5–0	Friendly
6.	22 September 1940	Råsunda Stadium, Solna, Sweden	Finland	3–0	5–0	Friendly
7.	22 September 1940	Råsunda Stadium, Solna, Sweden	Finland	4–0	5–0	Friendly
8.	3 October 1943	Helsinki Olympic Stadium, Helsinki, Finland	Finland	1–0	1–1	Friendly
