= Charles de Bock =

Dutch footballer

Charley de Bock
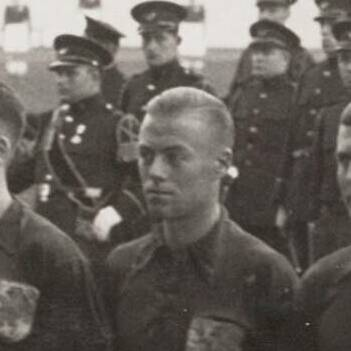

Personal information
- Full name: Charles Edward de Bock
- Date of birth: 3 July 1914
- Place of birth: Haarlem, Netherlands
- Date of death: 19 February 1975 (aged 60)
- Place of death: Overveen, Netherlands
- Position: Midfielder

Senior career*
Years	Team	Apps	(Gls)
- De Zwaluwen
1935-1938	BVC Bloemendaal		
1938-1942	VV Sneek		

International career
1936	Netherlands	1	(1)
- * Club domestic league appearances and goals

Charley de Bock (3 July 1914 – 19 February 1975) was a Dutch footballer. He played in one match for the Netherlands national football team in 1936.

After retiring as a football player, De Bock became a field hockey coach at HC Bloemendaal and won the 1971 Women's IFWHA World Conference in New Zealand with the Netherlands.

== Personal life ==
Born in Haarlem to Jan de Bock and Mary Jane Jones, he married Jeltje Hinke Boschma in Frisia in 1942 and the couple had 4 children.
