= Hans Mortensen =

Faroese entrepreneur and handball player (1943–2019)

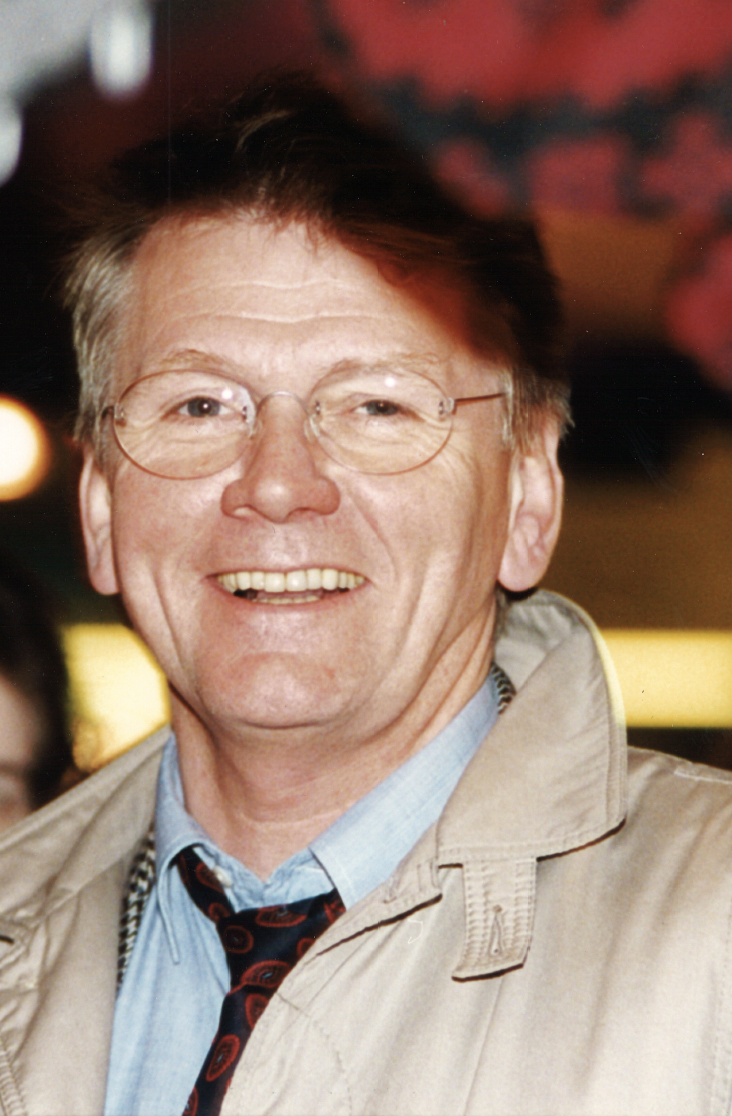
- Mortensen in 2012
- Born: Hans Mortensen; August 2, 1943; Tórshavn, Faroe Islands
- Died: September 11, 2019 (aged 76)
- Occupations: CEo, entrepreneur, merchant, handball player
- Years active: 1963–2007
- Spouse(s): Birgith Aslaugh Mortensen (m. 1964); Marjun á Plógv (m. 2007)
- Parent(s): Niels Gustav Mortensen and Ebba Mortensen
- Awards: Faroese Mother Language Award 2015

Hans Mortensen (September 2, 1943, at Tórshavn, Faroe Islands – September 11, 2019, at Tórshavn, Faroe Islands), was a Faroese businessman and entrepreneur. He was famous for founding and managing the biggest department store in Tórshavn, SMS, and was also recognised for his contribution in introducing trade and business terminology into the Faroese language. Between 1963 and 1976 he was part of the Faroese national handball team, first as a player and in 1976 as head coach.

== Personal life ==
Mortensen was born and raised in Tórshavn in the Faroe Islands. He was the son of business owners Niels Gustav Mortensen (1913–1987) and Ebba Mortensen (1920–2000), who each ran trading businesses in one of the older trading quarters of Tórshavn between 1952 and 1990. In 1964, he married Birgit Mortensen (née Sivertsen), and together they had a daughter, Elisabeth Mortensen and a son, Niels Mortensen. Niels Mortensen took over as CEO of SMS after his father stepped down from the position in 1996, and as a member of its board after Mortensen retired in 2007. After being a widower since 2001, Mortensen remarried in 2007 with Marjun á Plógv.

== Education ==
After completing primary and secondary school, Mortensen received his Upper Secondary diploma from Føroya Millum- og Realskúli and took on an apprenticeship at Føroya Banki (now BankNordik). In 1967, Mortensen graduated from the Niels Brock business school in Copenhagen and shortly after started working at the Magasin du Nord department store on Kongens Nytorv in Copenhagen. After two years at the department store, Mortensen returned to the Faroe Islands to found his own business.

== Sport ==
Mortensen's life-long commitment to Faroese handball began in the 1960s and 1970s. In 1963, at the age of 18, Mortensen became the president of the Tórshavn handball club Neistin and immediately initiated the construction of a club venue, completed in the following year. In 1964, Mortensen played on the first Faroese men's national handball team. In 1976, Mortensen was head coach for the men's national handball team during the Men's Handball World Championship 1976 Group C in Portugal.

== Career ==
After completing his education in Denmark, Mortensen ran his own retail business in his parents’ premises in central Tórshavn. But in 1970, Mortensen organised the first of many trade fairs in the Faroe Islands. A few attempts had been made earlier at arranging similar events in 1968 in Klaksvík. The popularity of the trade fairs showed that demand for the Faroese market was bigger than the market was capable of supplying at the time.

Most businesses were located in central Torshavn, and increasing traffic and construction was causing congestion. Tórshavn's city council was therefore planning to establish a shopping street as an extension of a new pharmacy at the outskirts of the city centre to divert some of the traffic.

Upon learning of the city plans and the reasons behind them, Mortensen suggested privatising the project in order to further promote business. After initial internal disputes, Mortensen was granted permission to build his department store, which would enable customers to run various errands in a single location.

Mortensen hired Danish architect Flemming Hansen to design a progressive department store, whose architecture would still be rooted in traditional Faroese building style. Construction began in 1976, and the department store SMS opened to the public on November 2, 1977. Mortensen was CEO of SMS from 1976 to 1996 and majority shareholder until 2007, when he sold all his shares to his son Niels Mortensen. Niels Mortensen has since then developed the business further.

== Business and development ==
The department store SMS was designed to resemble traditional Faroese boathouses, but with modern dimensions and interior, and Faroese shop names and business terminology was developed by taking into account common citizen and customer opinions, often through public naming competitions. Over time, the previous predominately Danish business terminology was replaced by newly created Faroese terminology, which continues to evolve with the introduction of new terms and technology.

In an effort to combine innovation with historic preservation, Mortensen collaborated with architects Gunnar Hoydal, Mette Skjold, and Ósbjørn Jacobsen in 2012 to create a public proposal on how to continue developing the Tórshavn city centre while maintaining its historic features.

== Awards ==
On International Mother Language Day in 2015, Mortensen received the Faroese Mother Language Award for his longstanding contribution to society and language, particularly his innovative approaches to Faroese trade and business.

== Literature ==
- Justinussen, Jens Christian Svabo: Fanget i fisken? En analyse af den politiske økonomi på Færøerne i efterkrigstiden, Speciale, Roskilde Universitetscenter. Institut for Miljø, Teknologi og Samfund, 1997
