= Alex Friedmann =

Danish footballer (1918-1997)

Personal information
- Date of birth: 26 September 1918
- Date of death: 20 May 1997 (aged 78)

International career
Years	Team	Apps	(Gls)
1937–1942	Denmark	9	(2)

Alex Friedmann (26 September 1918 – 20 May 1997) was a Danish footballer. He played in nine matches for the Denmark national football team from 1937 to 1942.
