= Arthur W. Barton =

Academic leader, senior soccer referee

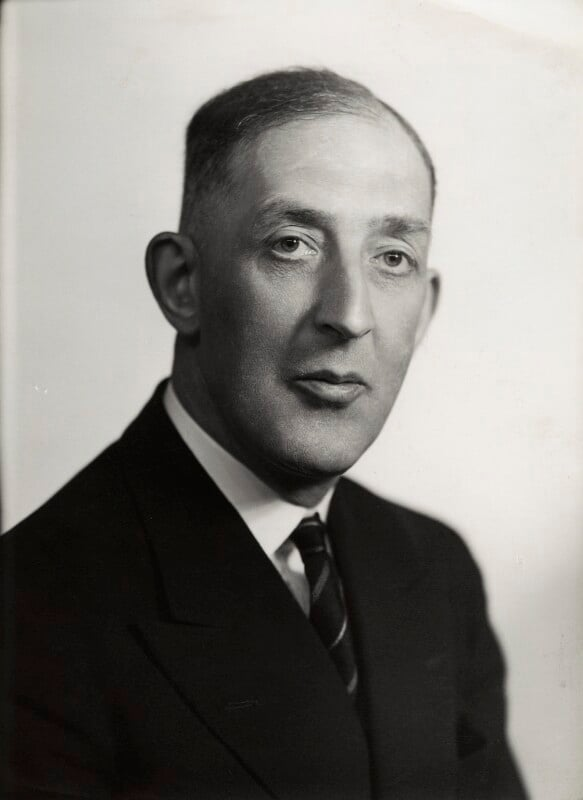
- Barton in 1950
- Full name: Arthur Willoughby Barton
- Born: 14 September 1899
- Died: 24 August 1976 (aged 76)
- Other occupation: Headmaster, academic author

International
Years	League	Role
1935–1939	FIFA	Referee

Arthur Willoughby Barton (14 September 1899 – 24 August 1976) was an English headmaster, academic author and association football referee.

== Early life and education ==
Barton's father was Edwin H Barton, professor of physics at University College, Nottingham. He was educated at Nottingham High School and then Trinity College, Cambridge, after military service with the Royal Engineers.

He read natural sciences (physics) taking Firsts in Parts I and II; in 1922, he was awarded first-Class honours in physics in the London BSc examination. From 1922 to 1925, he was a research student at the Cavendish Laboratory in Lord Rutherford's group.

== Physics Master ==
Barton was Chief Physics Master at Repton School from 1926 until 1939, when Geoffrey Fisher, later Archbishop of Canterbury, was headmaster.

== Doctorate ==
While at Repton he was awarded a doctorate from the University of London for a thesis on radioactive decay (the measurement of the half-period of radium C).

== Headmaster ==
In 1939, he was appointed headmaster of King Edward VII School, Sheffield (photo).

From 1950 to 1965 he was headmaster of the City of London School.

== Publications ==
Barton was the author of textbooks on heat and light, for example A Text Book on Heat (ASIN B000HIO678).

== Sport ==
Barton was a football referee. He refereed the semi-final between Austria and Poland in the 1936 Summer Olympic Games in Berlin, and was linesman in the 1936 FA Cup Final between Arsenal and Sheffield United.

== Personal life ==
In 1935, he married Alison Mary, second daughter of Colin Read Shaw.
