= Paul Sæthrang =

Norwegian footballer (1918-1994)

Personal information
- Date of birth: 19 July 1918
- Place of birth: Rjukan, Norway
- Date of death: 5 August 1994 (aged 76)
- Position: Forward

Senior career*
Years	Team	Apps	(Gls)
1935–1937	B 14		
1937–1951	Skeid		

International career
1938–1947	Norway B	4	(1)
1938–1947	Norway	4	(4)
- * Club domestic league appearances and goals

Paul Sæthrang (19 July 1918 – 5 August 1994) was a Norwegian football striker.

His son Pål Sæthrang was also capped for Norway. They were the second father-son combination to be capped, after Rolf Pedersen and Rolf Birger Pedersen.

Paul Sæthrang played for Skeid between 1937 and 1951, except for the war years 1941 to 1945, becoming cup champion in 1948. He represented Norway as a B and senior international.
