= Jørgen W. Hansen =

Danish footballer (1925–1969)

Jørgen Hansen
Personal information
- Full name: Jørgen Wagner Hansen
- Date of birth: 15 September 1925
- Place of birth: Frederiksberg, Denmark
- Date of death: 17 July 1969 (aged 43)
- Place of death: Holbæk, Denmark
- Position: Forward

Senior career*
Years	Team	Apps	(Gls)
- KB

International career
1947–1952	Denmark	18	(5)
Medal record
Men's football
Representing Denmark
Olympic Games
Bronze medal – third place	1948 London	Team
- * Club domestic league appearances and goals

Jørgen Wagner Hansen (15 September 1925 – 17 July 1969) was a Danish footballer who competed in the 1952 Summer Olympics. He was also part of Denmark's squad for the football tournament at the 1948 Summer Olympics, but he did not play in any matches.

Hansen scored the Denmark goal in a 3–1 defeat against Scotland in May 1951.

Beside being a footballer, Hansen was a physician and became chief physician at the hospital in Holbæk in 1964.

== Honours ==
Denmark

- Olympic Bronze Medal: 1948
