= Ragnar Lennartsson =

Swedish footballer (1910–1988)

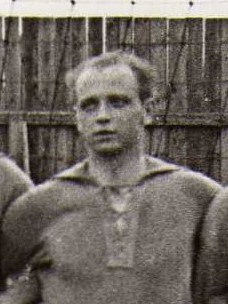

Personal information
- Full name: Karl Ragnar Lennartsson
- Date of birth: 20 January 1910
- Place of birth: Kinna, Sweden
- Date of death: 8 August 1988 (aged 78)
- Place of death: Billesholm, Sweden
- Position: Forward

Senior career*
Years	Team	Apps	(Gls)
- Fritsla
- Elfsborg
- Gårda

International career
1939	Sweden	2	(2)
- * Club domestic league appearances and goals

Karl Ragnar Lennartsson (20 January 1910 – 8 August 1988) was a Swedish footballer who played for Fritsla, Elfsborg and Gårda. He featured twice for the Sweden men's national football team in 1939, scoring two goals.

== Career statistics ==
=== International ===
Appearances and goals by national team and year
National team	Year	Apps	Goals
Sweden	1939	2	2
Total		2	2

=== International goals ===
Scores and results list Sweden's goal tally first.

No	Date	Venue	Opponent	Score	Result	Competition
1.	17 September 1939	Ullevaal Stadion, Aker, Norway	Norway	3–1	3–2	1937–47 Nordic Football Championship
2.	1 October 1939	Råsunda Stadium, Solna, Sweden	Denmark	1–1	4–1	1937–47 Nordic Football Championship
