= Svend Albrechtsen =

Danish footballer (1917–1975)

Personal information
- Full name: Svend Armand Albrechtsen
- Date of birth: 27 February 1917
- Place of birth: Copenhagen, Denmark
- Date of death: 13 April 1975 (aged 58)
- Place of death: Hørsholm, Denmark
- Position: Forward

Senior career*
Years	Team	Apps	(Gls)
1935–1949	Akademisk Boldklub		

International career
1938–1939	Denmark	3	(2)
- * Club domestic league appearances and goals

Svend Armand Albrechtsen (27 February 1917 – 13 April 1975) was a Danish footballer, who played his entire career for Akademisk Boldklub. He gained three caps for the Denmark national football team from 1938 to 1939.

== Personal life ==
Albrechtsen was an internee at Buchenwald concentration camp.
