= Torkild Andersen =

Norwegian footballer (1916-1977)

Personal information
- Full name: Torkild Henning Andersen
- Date of birth: 20 July 1916
- Place of birth: Fredrikstad, Norway
- Date of death: 21 May 1977 (aged 60)

Senior career*
Years	Team	Apps	(Gls)
- Lisleby FK
- Moss FK

International career
1937–1939	Norway	5	(3)
- * Club domestic league appearances and goals

Torkild Henning Andersen (20 July 1916 – 21 May 1977) was a Norwegian footballer. He played in five matches for the Norway national football team from 1937 to 1939. He was also named in Norway's squad for the Group 2 qualification tournament for the 1938 FIFA World Cup.
