= Åke Andersson (footballer, born 1917) =

Swedish footballer (1917–1983)

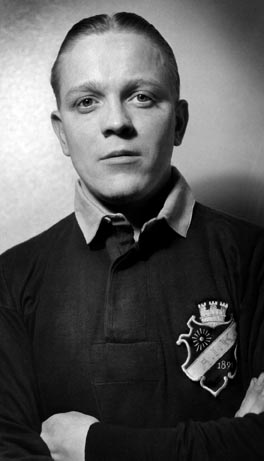

Personal information
- Date of birth: 22 April 1917
- Place of birth: Gothenburg, Sweden
- Date of death: 20 July 1983 (aged 66)
- Position: Forward

Senior career*
Years	Team	Apps	(Gls)
1935–1939	GAIS		
1939–1946	AIK		

International career
1937–1941	Sweden	12	(2)
- * Club domestic league appearances and goals

Åke Andersson (22 April 1917 – 20 July 1983) was a Swedish football forward who played for Sweden in the 1938 FIFA World Cup. He also played for GAIS.
