= Rudolf Eklöw =

Rudolf Eklöw (15 January 1904 - 29 September 1986, in Stockholm) was a sports journalist, association football referee, and Swedish sports manager. He is known for writing under his pseudonym: "The R" (Swedish: "R:et").

Eklöw served as an international referee, at major competitions from 1935 to 1939. His work included, three games at the 1935 Baltic Cup of football, one game in football at the 1936 Summer Olympics, three games at the 1936 Baltic Cup of football, and two games at the Nordic Football Championship.

Eklöw was made an honorary member of the International Ice Hockey Federation (IIHF) in 1976. He was inducted into the IIHF Hall of Fame in 1999, and inducted into the Swedish Hockey Hall of Fame in 2012.
