= Tønsberg Gressbane =

Football stadium in Tønsberg, Norway

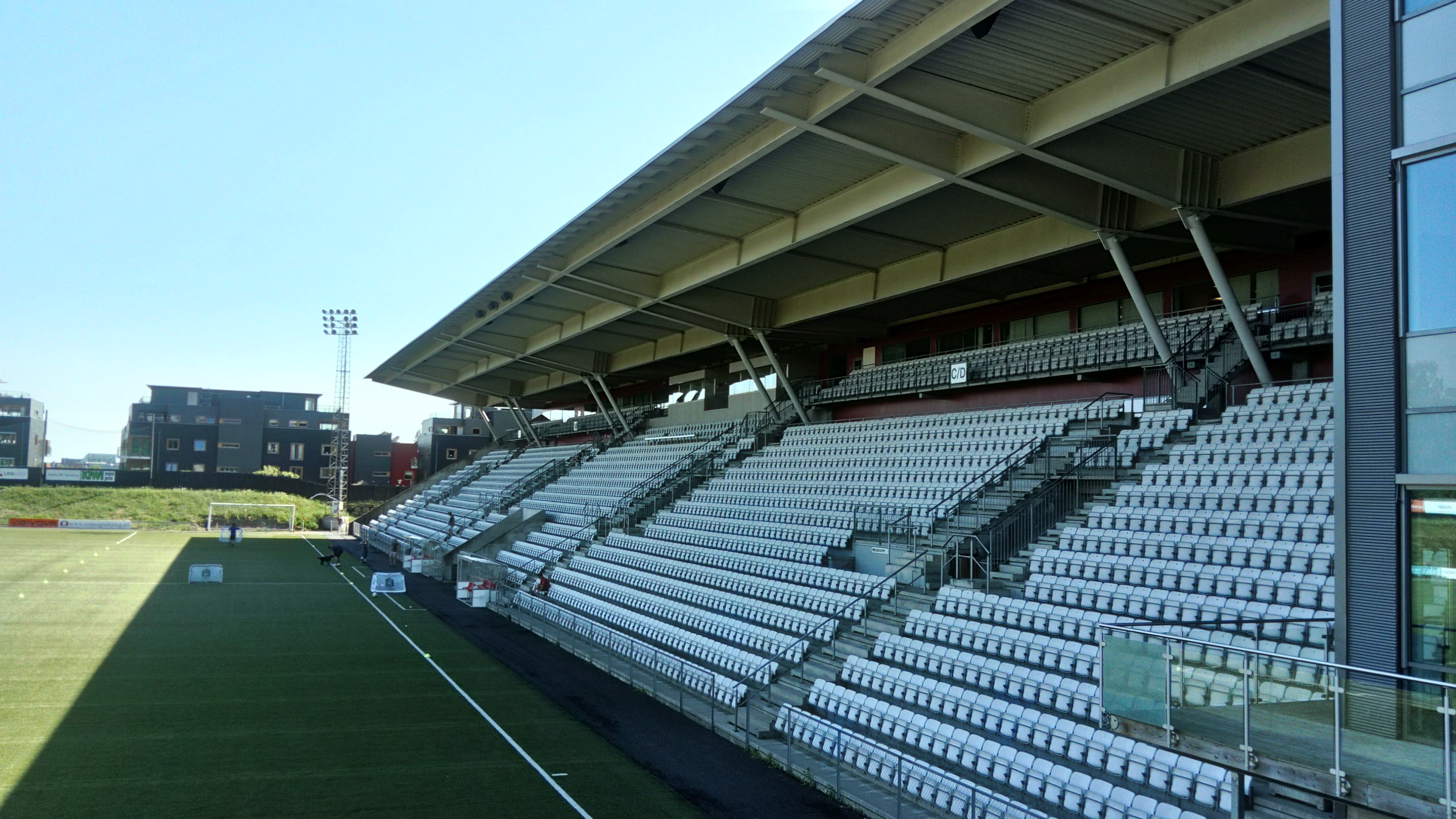
- Interactive map of Tønsberg Gressbane
- Location: Tønsberg, Vestfold, Norway
- Coordinates: 59°17′02″N 10°24′59″E
- Owner: Tønsberg Municipality
- Operator: Tønsberg Municipality
- Capacity: 5,600
- Surface: Artificial turf
- Record attendance: 16,000
- Field size: 105 by 68 metres (114.8 yd × 74.4 yd)

Construction
- Opened: 1937
- Renovated: 2003

Tenants
- FK Tønsberg, Tønsberg FK

Tønsberg Gressbane is a football stadium in Tønsberg, Norway. It is the home ground of FK Tønsberg and Tønsberg FK. It was the home ground of Eik-Tønsberg until 2001, when FK Tønsberg was formed.
