= Gunnar Hansen (footballer) =

Norwegian footballer (1923–2005)

Personal information
- Date of birth: 15 December 1923
- Date of death: 24 September 2005 (aged 81)

International career
Years	Team	Apps	(Gls)
1947–1950	Norway	7	(0)

Gunnar Hansen (15 December 1923 – 24 September 2005) was a Norwegian footballer. He played in seven matches for the Norway national football team from 1947 to 1950.
