= Stig-Göran Myntti =

Finnish footballer and bandy player (1925–2020)

Stig-Göran Myntti (6 August 1925 – 28 February 2020) was a Finnish footballer and bandy player. He was part of Finland's football squad at the 1952 Summer Olympics.

== Football career ==
Myntti earned 61 caps at international level between 1945 and 1958, scoring 5 goals. At club level Myntti played for VPS, Vasa IFK and RU-38. He scored 121 goals in 250 Mestaruussarja matches.

== Bandy career ==
Myntti capped 12 times and scored 4 goals at international level.

== Personal life ==
His grandson Henri Myntti is a former professional footballer.

== Honours ==
=== Football ===
- Finnish Championship: 1944, 1946, 1953
- Mestaruussarja Top Scorer: 1948

=== Bandy ===
- Bandy World Championship: Runner-up: 1957
