= Magnar Isaksen =

Norwegian footballer (1910–1979)

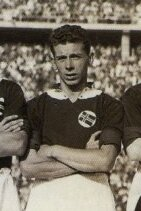
- Isaksen in 1936

Personal information
- Full name: Magnar Nikolai Isaksen
- Date of birth: 13 October 1910
- Place of birth: Kristiansund, Norway
- Date of death: 8 June 1979 (aged 68)
- Place of death: Oslo, Norway
- Position: Forward

Senior career*
Years	Team	Apps	(Gls)
1925–1932	Kristiansund		
1933–1946	Lyn		

International career
1936–1938	Norway	14	(5)
Medal record
Men's Football
Bronze medal – third place	1936 Berlin	Team competition
- * Club domestic league appearances and goals

Magnar Nikolai Isaksen (13 October 1910 – 8 June 1979) was a Norwegian footballer who played as a forward for Kristiansund FK and Lyn. He made 14 appearances for the Norway national team and competed in the 1936 Summer Olympics.

== Career ==
Magnar Isaksen was born in Kristiansund. He was capped 14 times for Norway and scored five goals.

Isaksen was selected in Norway's squad who competed in the 1936 Summer Olympics and won the bronze medal in the football tournament. He scored both Norway goals in the 2–0 win against Germany. Iskasen was injured in the semi-final against Italy and therefore did not play the bronze final. He won two consecutive Norwegian Cups with Lyn in 1945 and 1946.

He also took part in the 1938 FIFA World Cup.

== Honours ==
Norway

- Summer Olympics bronze medal: 1936

Lyn

- Norwegian Cup: 1945, 1946
