= Olav Navestad =

Norwegian footballer (1910-1958)

Personal information
- Date of birth: 12 February 1910
- Date of death: 29 April 1958 (aged 48)

International career
Years	Team	Apps	(Gls)
1939	Norway	1	(1)

Olav Navestad (12 February 1910 – 29 April 1958) was a Norwegian footballer. He played in one match for the Norway national football team in 1939.
