= Harry Yven =

Norwegian footballer (1912-1988)

Personal information
- Date of birth: 24 April 1912
- Place of birth: Sarpsborg, Norway
- Date of death: 24 February 1988 (aged 75)

International career
| Years | Team | Apps | (Gls) |
| 1931–1948 | Norway | 3 | (1) |

Harry Yven (24 April 1912 – 24 February 1988) was a Norwegian footballer. He played in three matches for the Norway national football team from 1931 to 1948.
