= Alf Martinsen =

Norwegian footballer (1911-1988)

Personal information
- Date of birth: 29 December 1911
- Place of birth: Lillestrøm, Norway
- Date of death: 23 August 1988 (aged 76)
- Place of death: Lillestrøm, Norway
- Position: Striker

Senior career*
Years	Team	Apps	(Gls)
- Lillestrøm Fram
- Lillestrøm SK

International career
1936–1946	Norway	25	(10)

Managerial career
- 1947–1950: Lillestrøm SK
- 1952–1953: Lillestrøm SK
- * Club domestic league appearances and goals

Olympic medal record

Men's Football
Bronze medal – third place	1936 Berlin	Team competition

Alf "Kaka" Martinsen (29 December 1911 – 23 August 1988) was a Norwegian football player. At the 1936 Summer Olympics he was a member of the Norwegian team which won the bronze medal in the football tournament. He also took part in the 1938 FIFA World Cup, but did not play a single match. On club level he started his career in Lillestrøm-based workers' team Fram, before joining Lillestrøm SK.

He coached Lillestrøm SK from 1947 to 1950 and from 1952 to 1953.
