= Norway national football team results (1908–1929) =

- Win Draw Loss

This is a list of the Norway national football team results from Norway's first international match in 1908 to 1929.

== 1900s ==
Win Draw Loss

=== 1908 ===
12 July Friendly	Sweden	11–3	Norway	Gothenburg, Sweden
(UTC+1); Match 1	Gustafsson 14', 79'; Börjesson 24', 60', 75', 86'; Bergström 27', 29', 44', 89'; Lindman 63'	Report	Bøhn 1', 66'; Endrerud 45'	Stadium: Idrottsplatsen, Tegelbruksängen; Attendance: 3,000; Referee: Charles Smith (England)

== 1910s ==
=== 1910 ===
11 September Friendly	Norway	0–4	Sweden	Kristiania, Norway
13:00 (UTC+1); Match 2		Report	Myhrberg 47', 62'; Gustafsson 60', 80'	Stadium: Frogner; Attendance: 6,000; Referee: Charles Buchwald (Denmark)

=== 1911 ===
17 September Friendly	Sweden	4–1	Norway	Solna, Sweden
13:00 (UTC+1); Match 3	Ekroth 8', 35'; Börjesson 15'; Dahlström 47'	Report	Nysted 60'	Stadium: Råsunda IP; Attendance: 3,000; Referee: Nils Middelboe (Denmark)

=== 1912 ===
16 June Friendly	Norway	1–2	Sweden	Kristiania, Norway
20:00 (UTC+1); Match 4	R. Maartmann 22'	Report	Ekroth 37', 75'	Stadium: Frogner; Attendance: 6,000; Referee: Nils Middelboe (Denmark)

23 June Friendly	Norway	0–6	Hungary	Kristiania, Norway
19:30 (UTC+1); Match 5		Report	Schlosser-Lakatos 10', 89'; Tóth-Potya 31'; Bodnár 49', 71', 73'	Stadium: Frogner; Attendance: 4,000; Referee: Ruben Gelbord (Sweden)

30 June 1912 Olympic Games; Quarter-final	Denmark	7–0	Norway	Solna, Sweden
16:30 (UTC+1); Match 6	Olsen 4', 70', 88'; Wolfhagen 25'; Middelboe 37'; Nielsen 60', 85'	Report		Stadium: Råsunda IP; Attendance: 700; Referee: Ruben Gelbord (Sweden)

1 July 1912 Olympic Games Consolation tournament Quarter-final	Austria	1–0	Norway	Traneberg, Sweden
11:00 (UTC+1); Match 7	Neubauer 2'	Report		Stadium: Tranebergs IP; Attendance: 200; Referee: Per Sjöblom (Sweden)

3 November Friendly	Sweden	4–2	Norway	Gothenburg, Sweden
(UTC+1); Match 8	Frykman 10'; Svensson 18', 37'; Ekroth 70' (pen.)	Report	Ditlev-Simonsen 21', 55'	Stadium: Valhalla IP; Attendance: 3,000; Referee: Charles Buchwald (Denmark)

=== 1913 ===
8 June Friendly	Sweden	9–0	Norway	Stockholm, Sweden
19:30 (UTC+1); Match 9	Svensson 4', 65'; Bergström 9'; Gustafsson 23', 36', 50', 52'; Ekroth 75', 86'	Report		Stadium: Stockholm Olympic Stadium; Attendance: 10,000; Referee: Ruben Gelbord (Sweden)

14 September Friendly	Russia	1–1	Norway	Moscow, Russia
Match 10	Sysoev 40'	Report	Lauritzen 30'	Stadium: Sokolniki Sports Club Pitch; Attendance: 4,000; Referee: Alexander Schultz (Russia)

26 October Friendly	Norway	1–1	Sweden	Kristiania, Norway
Match 11	Skou 60' (pen.)	Report	Olsson 80'	Stadium: Bislett Stadion; Attendance: 10,000; Referee: Charles Buchwald (Denmark)

=== 1914 ===
28 June Friendly	Norway	0–1	Sweden	Kristiania, Norway
17:00 (UTC+1); Match 12		Report	Hjelm 60'	Stadium: Frogner stadion Attendance: 8,000; Referee: Hagbard Vestergaard (Denmark)

12 July Friendly	Norway	1–1	Russia	Kristiania, Norway
18:00 (UTC+1); Match 13	R. Martmann 44'	Report	Krotov 5'	Stadium: Frogner stadion Attendance: 6,000; Referee: Daniel Eie (Norway)

25 October Friendly	Sweden	7–0	Norway	Solna, Sweden
13:00 (UTC+1); Match 14	Ekroth 5', 80', 86'; Söderberg 20', 65', 68'; Johansson 47'	Report		Stadium: Råsunda IP; Attendance: 5,000; Referee: Hagbard Vestergaard (Denmark)

=== 1915 ===
27 June Friendly	Norway	1–1	Sweden	Kristiania, Norway
13:00 (UTC+1); Match 15	Engebretsen 54'	Report	Gunnarsson 82'	Stadium: Frogner stadion Attendance: 10,000; Referee: Hagbard Vestergaard (Denmark)

19 September Friendly	Denmark	8–1	Norway	Copenhagen, Denmark
13:30 (UTC+1); Match 16	Nielsen 23', 37', 71'; Olsen 28', 65', 77'; Rohde 53'; Castella 80' (pen.)	Report	H. Ditlev-Simonsen 20'	Stadium: Københavns Idrætspark; Attendance: 5,000; Referee: Erik Alstam (Sweden)

24 October Friendly	Sweden	5–2	Norway	Stockholm, Sweden
13:30 (UTC+1); Match 17	Svensson 10', 14', 61'; Gunnarsson 44', 77'	Report	H. Ditlev-Simonsen 65'; Wold 85' (pen.)	Stadium: Stockholm Olympic Stadium; Attendance: 8,000; Referee: Hagbard Vestergaard (Denmark)

=== 1916 ===
25 June Friendly	Norway	0–2	Denmark	Kristiania, Norway
13:00 (UTC+2); Match 18		Report	Rohde 75', 82'	Stadium: Frogner stadion Attendance: 12,000; Referee: Erik Alstam (Sweden)

2 July Friendly	Sweden	6–0	Norway	Stockholm, Sweden
14:00 (UTC+1); Match 19	Karlstrand 25'; Gustafsson 30', 61', 80'; Wicksell 50'; Svensson 65'	Report		Stadium: Stockholm Olympic Stadium; Attendance: 6,000; Referee: Hagbard Vestergaard (Denmark)

3 September Friendly	Norway	1–1	United States	Kristiania, Norway
18:00 (UTC+2); Match 20	Engebretsen 50'	Report	Ellis 75'	Stadium: Frogner stadion Attendance: 12,000; Referee: Ernst Albihn (Sweden)

1 October Friendly	Norway	0–0	Sweden	Kristiania, Norway
13:00 (UTC+1); Match 21		Report		Stadium: Frogner stadion Attendance: 12,000; Referee: Hagbard Vestergaard (Denmark)

15 October Friendly	Denmark	8–0	Norway	Copenhagen, Denmark
13:30 (UTC+1); Match 22	Rohde 2', 10', 57'; Olsen 12'; Nielsen 25', 40', 47', 70'	Report		Stadium: Københavns Idrætspark; Attendance: 10,000; Referee: Erik Alstam (Sweden)

=== 1917 ===
17 June Friendly	Norway	1–2	Denmark	Kristiania, Norway
18:00 (UTC+1); Match 23	Helgesen 80'	Report	Olsen 70'; Wolfhagen 85' (pen.)	Stadium: Frogner stadion Attendance: 12,000; Referee: Ernst Albihn (Sweden)

19 August Friendly	Sweden	3–3	Norway	Hälsingborg, Sweden
13:30 (UTC+1); Match 24	Ström 15', 47'; Malm 54'	Report	Aas 22'; Gundersen 64', 81'	Stadium: Olympia; Attendance: 4,000; Referee: Hagbard Vestergaard (Denmark)

16 September Friendly	Norway	0–2	Sweden	Kristiania, Norway
13:00 (UTC+1); Match 25		Report	Ekroth 8'; Gustafsson 77'	Stadium: Frogner stadion Attendance: 12,000; Referee: Hagbard Vestergaard (Denmark)

7 October Friendly	Denmark	12–0	Norway	Copenhagen, Denmark
13:30 (UTC+1); Match 26	Rohde 5', 28'; Klein 9', 13', 25'; Berth 68'; Nielsen 71', 75', 77', 78', 81'; Olsen 83'	Report		Stadium: Københavns Idrætspark; Attendance: 15,000; Referee: Ernst Albihn (Sweden)

=== 1918 ===
26 May Friendly	Sweden	2–0	Norway	Stockholm, Sweden
13:30 (UTC+1); Match 27	Gustafsson 23'; Sterne 73'	Report		Stadium: Stockholm Olympic Stadium; Attendance: 10,000; Referee: Hagbard Vestergaard (Denmark)

16 June Friendly	Norway	3–1	Denmark	Kristiania, Norway
18:00 (UTC+1); Match 28	Helsing 25'; Helgesen 26'; Gundersen 70'	Report	Grøthan 88'	Stadium: Frogner stadion Attendance: 12,000; Referee: Ernst Albihn (Sweden)

15 September Friendly	Norway	2–1	Sweden	Kristiania, Norway
13:00 (UTC+1); Match 29	Gundersen 49', 55'	Report	Börjesson 68'	Stadium: Frogner stadion Attendance: 12,000; Referee: Hagbard Vestergaard (Denmark)

6 October Friendly	Denmark	4–0	Norway	Copenhagen, Denmark
13:30 (UTC+1); Match 30	C. Hansen 19'; Blicher 24' (pen.); Olsen 49'; Nielsen 82'	Report		Stadium: Københavns Idrætspark; Attendance: 13,000; Referee: Ernst Albihn (Sweden)

=== 1919 ===
12 June Friendly	Denmark	5–1	Norway	Copenhagen, Denmark
19:00 (UTC+1); Match 31	Nielsen 24', 42', 59'; Rohde 27', 35'	Report	Helgesen 12' (pen.)	Stadium: Københavns Idrætspark; Attendance: 15,000; Referee: Ernst Albihn (Sweden)

29 June Friendly	Norway	4–3	Sweden	Kristiania, Norway
13:00 (UTC+1); Match 32	Engebretsen 2', 80'; Gundersen 6'; Wold 47'	Report	Karlsson 25'; Aulie 58' (o.g.); Bergström 63'	Stadium: Gressbanen; Attendance: 14,000; Referee: Hagbard Vestergaard (Denmark)

31 August Friendly	Norway	1–1	Netherlands	Kristiania, Norway
12:30 (UTC+1); Match 33	Engebretsen 67'	Report	Buitenweg 58'	Stadium: Gressbanen; Attendance: 14,000; Referee: Kurt Nilsson (Sweden)

14 September Friendly	Sweden	1–5	Norway	Gothenburg, Sweden
13:00 (UTC+1); Match 34	Svedberg 8'	Report	Engebretsen 20', 21', 32'; Wold 54'; Gundersen 80'	Stadium: Ullevi; Attendance: 12,000; Referee: Hagbard Vestergaard (Denmark)

21 September Friendly	Norway	3–2	Denmark	Kristiania, Norway
13:00 (UTC+1); Match 35	Gundersen 11', 82'; Helgesen 77'	Report	Nielsen 18', 72'	Stadium: Gressbanen; Attendance: 12,000; Referee: Ernst Albihn (Sweden)

== 1920s ==
=== 1920 ===
13 June Friendly	Norway	1–1	Denmark	Kristiania, Norway
19:30 (UTC+1); Match 36	Gundersen 10'	Report	Andersen 42'	Stadium: Gressbanen; Attendance: 14,000; Referee: Ernst Albihn (Sweden)

27 June Friendly	Norway	0–3	Sweden	Kristiania, Norway
13:00 (UTC+1); Match 37		Report	Andersson 10'; Bergström 22'; Karlsson 65'	Stadium: Gressbanen; Attendance: 14,000; Referee: Hagbard Vestergaard (Denmark)

28 August 1920 Summer Olympics; First round	Norway	3–1	Great Britain	Antwerp, Belgium
15:30 (UTC+1); Match 38	Gundersen 13', 51'; Wilhelms 63'	Report	Nicholas 25'	Stadium: Olympisch Stadion; Attendance: 5,000; Referee: Johannes Mutters (Netherlands)

29 August 1920 Summer Olympics; Quarter-finals	Czechoslovakia	4–0	Norway	Brussels, Belgium
16:30 (UTC+1); Match 39	Vaník 8'; Janda 17', 66', 77'	Report		Stadium: La Butte; Attendance: 4,000; Referee: Charles Barette (Belgium)

31 August 1920 Summer Olympics; Play-off	Italy	2–1 (a.e.t.)	Norway	Antwerp, Belgium
10:00 (UTC+1); Match 40	Sardi 46'; Badini 96'	Report	Andersen 41'	Stadium: Stadion Broodstraat; Attendance: 500; Referee: Louis Fourgous (France)

26 September Friendly	Sweden	0–0	Norway	Stockholm, Sweden
14:00 (UTC+1); Match 41		Report		Stadium: Olympic Stadium; Attendance: 16,000; Referee: Willem Boas (Netherlands)

=== 1921 ===
25 May Friendly	Norway	3–2	Finland	Kristiania, Norway
19:00 (UTC+1); Match 42	Berstad 30', 43'; Paulsen 48'	Report	Eklöf 15'; Mantila 31'	Stadium: Gressbanen; Attendance: 14,000; Referee: Ernst Albihn (Sweden)

19 June Friendly	Norway	3–1	Sweden	Kristiania, Norway
12:30 (UTC+1); Match 43	Gundersen 44'; Strøm 48'; Resberg 73'	Report	Kock 75'	Stadium: Gressbanen; Attendance: 15,000; Referee: John Howcroft (England)

18 September Friendly	Sweden	0–3	Norway	Stockholm, Sweden
12:30 (UTC+1); Match 44		Report	Gundersen 9'; Holm 19'; Wilhelms 44'	Stadium: Olympic Stadium; Attendance: 12,000; Referee: Lauritz Andersen (Denmark)

2 October Friendly	Denmark	3–1	Norway	Copenhagen, Denmark
13:30 (UTC+1); Match 45	Nielsen 7', 51', 75'	Report	Helgesen 64'	Stadium: Københavns Idrætspark; Attendance: 22,000; Referee: Arthur Björklund (Sweden)

=== 1922 ===
23 August Friendly	Sweden	0–0	Norway	Stockholm, Sweden
17:30 (UTC+1); Match 46		Report		Stadium: Olympic Stadium; Attendance: 14,000; Referee: Einer Ulrich (Denmark)

26 August Friendly	Finland	1–3	Norway	Helsinki, Finland
17:30 (UTC+2); Match 47	Eklöf 60'	Report	Nielsen 38'; Strøm 43'; Gundersen 85'	Stadium: Töölön Pallokenttä; Attendance: 5,000; Referee: Eric Gustavsson (Sweden)

10 September Friendly	Norway	3–3	Denmark	Fredrikstad, Norway
13:00 (UTC+1); Match 48	Gundersen 5'; Wilhelms 74'; Aas 89'	Report	Grøthan 30'; Nielsen 38', 76'	Stadium: Fredrikstad Idræts- og Fotbaldplads; Attendance: 10,500; Referee: Hjalmar Lundberg (Sweden)

24 September Friendly	Norway	0–5	Sweden	Kristiania, Norway
12:30 (UTC+1); Match 49		Report	Malm 4', 25'; Dahl 30', 40', 75'	Stadium: Gressbanen; Attendance: 15,000; Referee: Lauritz Andersen (Denmark)

=== 1923 ===
17 June Friendly	Norway	3–0	Finland	Kristiania, Norway
12:30 (UTC+1); Match 50	Strøm 29', 60'; Johnsen 75'	Report		Stadium: Gressbanen; Attendance: 12,000; Referee: John Fowler (England)

21 June Friendly	Norway	2–2	Switzerland	Kristiania, Norway
19:30 (UTC+1); Match 51	Berstad 62'; Johnsen 68'	Report	Afflerbach 38'; Charpillod 40'	Stadium: Gressbanen; Attendance: 10,000; Referee: John Fowler (England)

16 September Friendly	Norway	2–3	Sweden	Kristiania, Norway
12:30 (UTC+1); Match 52	Wilhelms 28'; Ulrichsen 65' (pen.)	Report	Kaufeldt 52'; Kock 73'; Rydell 80'	Stadium: Gressbanen; Attendance: 14,000; Referee: Lauritz Andersen (Denmark)

30 September Friendly	Denmark	2–1	Norway	Copenhagen, Denmark
13:30 (UTC+1); Match 53	Blicher 47' (pen.); Jørgensen 53'	Report	Johnsen 22'	Stadium: Københavns Idrætspark; Attendance: 20,000; Referee: Johannes Mutters (Netherlands)

28 October Friendly	France	0–2	Norway	Paris, France
14:30 (UTC); Match 54		Report	Wilhelms 12'; Berstad 18'	Stadium: Parc des Princes; Attendance: 12,000; Referee: Robert Walton (England)

4 November Friendly	Germany	1–0	Norway	Hamburg, Germany
(UTC+1); Match 55	Harder 22'	Report		Stadium: Stadion Hoheluft; Attendance: 20,000; Referee: Theo van Zwieteren (Netherlands)

=== 1924 ===
15 June Friendly	Norway	0–2	Germany	Kristiania, Norway
12:30 (UTC+1); Match 56		Report	Sutor 18'; Wieder 36'	Stadium: Gressbanen; Attendance: 6,000; Referee: Arthur Björklund (Sweden)

23 August Friendly	Finland	2–0	Norway	Helsinki, Finland
17:50 (UTC+2); Match 57	Kanerva 34'; Fallström 42'	Report		Stadium: Töölön Pallokenttä; Attendance: 3,000; Referee: Ruben Gelbord (Sweden)

14 September 1924–28 Nordic Championship	Norway	1–3	Denmark	Kristiania, Norway
13:00 (UTC+1); Match 58	Berstad 11' (pen.)	Report	Olsen 21'; Nielsen 26', 31'	Stadium: Gressbanen; Attendance: 15,000; Referee: Eric Ohlsson (Sweden)

21 September 1924–28 Nordic Championship	Sweden	6–1	Norway	Solna, Sweden
14:00 (UTC+1); Match 59	Keller 2'; Kaufeldt 44', 54'; Rydell 78', 86', 89'	Report	Berstad 32'	Stadium: Råsunda IP; Attendance: 8,000; Referee: John Langenus (Belgium)

=== 1925 ===
7 June Friendly	Norway	1–0	Finland	Oslo, Norway
12:30 (UTC+1); Match 60	Olsen 86'	Report		Stadium: Gressbanen; Attendance: 12,000; Referee: Axel Bergqvist (Sweden)

21 June 1924–28 Nordic Championship	Denmark	5–1	Norway	Copenhagen, Denmark
(UTC+1); Match 61	Nilsson 7', 71'; Nielsen 49'; Rohde 73'; Ei. Larsen 81'	Report	Lunde 60'	Stadium: Københavns Idrætspark; Attendance: 23,000; Referee: Noel Watson (England)

23 August 1924–28 Nordic Championship	Norway	3–7	Sweden	Oslo, Norway
12:30 (UTC+1); Match 62	Berstad 3', 34'; Lunde 68'	Report	Rydell 22', 42', 44', 62'; Kaufeldt 30', 89'; Haglund 71'	Stadium: Gressbanen; Attendance: 15,000; Referee: Lauritz Andersen (Denmark)

=== 1926 ===
6 June Friendly	Finland	2–5	Norway	Helsinki, Finland
18:00 (UTC+2); Match 63	Kanerva 70', 85'	Report	Gundersen 13', 75', 89'; Jacobsen 56'; Andersen 60'	Stadium: Töölön Pallokenttä; Attendance: 4,000; Referee: Knut Lundstedt (Sweden)

9 June 1924–28 Nordic Championship	Sweden	3–2	Norway	Stockholm, Sweden
19:15 (UTC+1); Match 64	Kaufeldt 31'; Rydell 60', 69'	Report	Andersen 19'; Gundersen 26'	Stadium: Olympic Stadium; Attendance: 13,500; Referee: František Cejnar (Czechoslovakia)

19 September 1924–28 Nordic Championship	Norway	2–2	Denmark	Oslo, Norway
12:30 (UTC+1); Match 65	Gundersen 24'; Berstad 35'	Report	Rohde 9', 48'	Stadium: Gressbanen; Attendance: 15,000; Referee: Axel Bergqvist (Sweden)

10 October Friendly	Norway	3–4	Poland	Fredrikstad, Norway
13:00 (UTC+1); Match 66	Steen 42', 76'; Andersen 54'	Report	Balcer 58', 86'; Kałuża 62', 63'	Stadium: Fredrikstad Idræts- og Fotbaldplads; Attendance: 5,000; Referee: Lauritz Andersen (Denmark)

=== 1927 ===
29 May Friendly; NFF's 25th Anniversary Match	Norway	0–1	Denmark	Aker, Norway
13:00 (UTC+1); Match 67		Report	Uldaler 87'	Stadium: Ullevaal Stadion; Attendance: 15,000; Referee: Axel Bergqvist (Sweden)

15 June Friendly	Norway	3–1	Finland	Aker, Norway
19:30 (UTC+1); Match 68	Møller 24'; Strøm 47'; Berstad 63'	Report	Åström 54'	Stadium: Ullevaal Stadion; Attendance: 16,000; Referee: Arthur Björklund (Sweden)

26 June 1924–28 Nordic Championship	Norway	3–5	Sweden	Oslo, Norway
13:00 (UTC+1); Match 69	Berstad 5', 80'; Gundersen 89'	Report	Rydell 18', 23', 65'; Olsson 38', 68'	Stadium: Gressbanen; Attendance: 10,000; Referee: Otto Remke (Denmark)

23 October Friendly	Germany	6–2	Norway	Altona, Germany
15:00 (UTC+1); Match 70	Hochgesang 55', 88'; Pöttinger 67', 69'; Kalb 73'; Hofmann 82'	Report	Dahl 3'; Gundersen 24'	Stadium: Altonaer Stadion; Attendance: 30,000; Referee: Lauritz Andersen (Denmark)

30 October 1924–28 Nordic Championship	Denmark	3–1	Norway	Copenhagen, Denmark
13:30 (UTC+1); Match 71	Jørgensen 48'; Rohde 58'; Hansen 69'	Report	Gundersen 19'	Stadium: Københavns Idrætspark; Attendance: 20,000; Referee: Alfred Birlem (Germany)

=== 1928 ===
3 June Friendly	Finland	0–6	Norway	Helsinki, Finland
14:30 (UTC+2); Match 72		Report	E. Andersen 4', 16'; Gundersen 32', 52'; S. Andersen 61'; Helgesen 62'	Stadium: Töölön Pallokenttä; Attendance: 6,000; Referee: Ragnar Bäckström (Sweden)

7 June 1924–28 Nordic Championship	Sweden	6–1	Norway	Stockholm, Sweden
19:15 (UTC+1); Match 73	Keller 15', 70'; Lundahl 22', 57'; Kroon 28', 76'	Report	Helgesen 54'	Stadium: Olympic Stadium; Attendance: 19,000; Referee: Otto Remke (Denmark)

17 June 1924–28 Nordic Championship	Norway	2–3	Denmark	Aker, Norway
13:00 (UTC+1); Match 74	Berstad 64' (pen.); S. Andersen 81'	Report	Hansen 66'; Rohde 70'; Jørgensen 72'	Stadium: Ullevaal Stadion; Attendance: 15,000; Referee: Vidar Stenborg (Sweden)

23 September Friendly	Norway	0–2	Germany	Aker, Norway
13:00 (UTC+1); Match 75		Report	Schmitt 17'; Kuzzora 62'	Stadium: Ullevaal Stadion; Attendance: 16,400; Referee: Lauritz Andersen (Denmark)

=== 1929 ===
12 June Friendly	Norway	4–4	Netherlands	Aker, Norway
19:30 (UTC+1); Match 76	Juve 39', 44', 53'; Andersen 81'	Report	Kools 10', 89'; Tap 16'; Landaal 27'	Stadium: Ullevaal Stadion; Attendance: 14,000; Referee: Lauritz Andersen (Denmark)

18 June 1929–32 Nordic Championship	Norway	4–0	Finland	Aker, Norway
19:30 (UTC+1); Match 77	Juve 8', 15', 73'; Er. Andersen 30'	Report		Stadium: Ullevaal Stadion; Attendance: 12,000; Referee: Carl Olsson (Sweden)

23 June 1929–32 Nordic Championship	Denmark	2–5	Norway	Copenhagen, Denmark
13:30 (UTC+1); Match 78	Jørgensen 32'; Christophersen 82' (pen.)	Report	Juve 41', 60'; Berg-Johannesen 69'; Er. Andersen 72', 77'	Stadium: Københavns Idrætspark; Attendance: 20,000; Referee: Alfred Birlem (Germany)

29 September 1929–32 Nordic Championship	Norway	2–1	Sweden	Aker, Norway
13:00 (UTC+1); Match 79	Juve 21'; O. Gundersen 66'	Report	Kroon 33'	Stadium: Ullevaal Stadion; Attendance: 24,200; Referee: Lauritz Andersen (Denmark)

3 November Friendly	Netherlands	1–4	Norway	Amsterdam, Netherlands
14:00 (UTC+00:20); Match 80	van den Broek 19'	Report	Juve 9', 22'; Berg-Johannesen 39', 70'	Stadium: Olympic Stadium; Attendance: 19,000; Referee: Henri Cristophe (Belgium)
