= Sweden men's national football team results (1908–1919) =

- Win Draw Loss

This is a list of the men's Sweden national football team results (1908 to 1919). Between the beginning match in 1908 and ending match in 1919, Sweden played in 55 matches, resulting in 21 victories, 9 draws, 25 defeats. Major tournaments included two Olympic Football Tournaments: Sweden finishing fourth in 1908 and being eliminated in the first round in 1912 by the Netherlands.

== Results ==
=== 1908 ===
12 July 1908 International Friendly	Sweden	11 – 3	Norway	Gothenburg, Sweden
13:00 (UTC+1:00)	Gustafsson 14', 79'; Börjesson 24', 60', 75', 86', 89'; Bergström 27', 29', 44'; Lindman 63'	Report	Bøhn 1', 66'; Endrerud 45'	Stadium: Idrottsplatsen; Attendance: 3,000; Referee: Charles Smith (England)

8 September 1908 International Friendly	Sweden	1 – 6	England	Gothenburg, Sweden
17:30 (UTC+1:00)	Bergström 76'	Report	Purnell (?); Louch (?); Berry (?)	Stadium: Walhalla; Attendance: 2,000; Referee: Ruben Gelbord (Sweden)
Note: Erik Bergström set the goal-scoring record for Sweden (5 goals)

20 October 1908 1908 Olympic Games; Quarter final	Great Britain	12 – 1	Sweden	London, England
15:00 (UTC)	Chapman 8'; Purnell 10', 12', 33', 77'; Stapley 15', 54'; Woodward 22', 67'; Hawkes 36', 56'; Berry 85'		Bergström 65'	Stadium: White City Stadium; Attendance: 2,000; Referee: John T. Ibbotson (England)
Note: Heaviest defeat of the Sweden football team at the time

23 October 1908 1908 Olympic Games; Bronze medal match	Sweden	0 – 2	Netherlands	London, England
15:00 (UTC)		Report	Reeman 6'; Snethlage 58'	Stadium: White City Stadium; Attendance: 1,000; Referee: John Hargreaves Pearson (England)

25 October 1908 International Friendly	Netherlands	5 – 3	Sweden	The Hague, Netherlands
14:30 (UTC+0:20)	Snethlage 6', 51'; Welcker 41'; Francken 49'; Thomée 73'	Report	Gustafsson 8', 28'; Ohlson 21'	Stadium: De Diepput; Attendance: 8,000; Referee: Joseph Brauburger (Belgium)

26 October 1908 International Friendly	Belgium	2 – 1	Sweden	Brussels, Belgium
15:00 (UTC+0:00)	Kevorkian 30'; Goossens 32'	Report	Gustafsson 39'	Stadium: Vivier d´Oie; Attendance: 800; Referee: Charles Barette (Belgium)

=== 1909 ===
6 November 1909 International Friendly	England	7 – 0	Sweden	Kingston upon Hull, England
14:45 (UTC+0:00)	Owen 4', 37', 87'; Stapely 5', 50', 73'; Woodward 74'	Report		Stadium: Anlaby Road; Attendance: 10,000; Referee: Christiaan Jacobus Groothoff (Netherlands)

=== 1910 ===
11 September 1910 International Friendly	Norway	0 – 4	Sweden	Oslo, Norway
13:00 (UTC+1:00)		Report	Myhrberg 47', 62'; Gustafsson 60', 80'	Stadium: Gamle Frogner Stadion; Attendance: 6,000; Referee: Charles von Buchwald (Denmark)

=== 1911 ===
18 June 1911 International Friendly	Sweden	2 – 4	Germany	Solna, Sweden
13:30 (UTC+1:00)	Gustafsson 28', 29'	Report	Dumke 13', 44', 83'; Kipp 54'	Stadium: Råsunda IP; Attendance: 3,000; Referee: Charles von Buchwald (Denmark)
Note: Karl Gustafsson set the goal scoring record for Sweden (9 goals)

17 September 1911 International Friendly	Sweden	4 – 1	Norway	Solna, Sweden
13:00 (UTC+1:00)	Ekroth 8', 35'; Börjesson 15'; Dahlström 47'	Report	Nysted 60'	Stadium: Råsunda IP; Attendance: 3,000; Referee: Nils Middelboe (Denmark)

22 October 1911 International Friendly	Finland (Russia)	2 – 5	Sweden	Helsinki, Finland
13:30 (UTC+1:40)	Lindbäck 3'; Jerima 5'	Report	Eriksson 40'; Persson 46'; Brolin 65', 86'; Andersson 88'	Stadium: Eläintarha Stadium; Attendance: 1,000; Referee: Arvo Eerikäinen (Finland)

29 October 1911 International Friendly	Germany	1 – 3	Sweden	Hamburg, Germany
15:00 (UTC+1:00)	Möller 80'	Report	Börjesson 15', 35'; Ohlson 60'	Stadium: Stadion Hoheluft; Attendance: 6,000; Referee: Herbert Willing (Netherlands)

=== 1912 ===
16 June 1912 International Friendly	Norway	1 – 2	Sweden	Oslo, Norway
20:00 (UTC+1:00)	Maartmann 22'	Report	Ekroth 37', 75'	Stadium: Gamle Frogner Stadion; Attendance: 6,000; Referee: Nils Middelboe (Denmark)

20 June 1912 International Friendly	Sweden	2 – 2	Hungary	Gothenburg, Sweden
19:45 (UTC+1:00)	Bergström 8'; Svensson 46'	Report	Bodnár 37'; Pataki 58'	Stadium: Valhalla IP; Attendance: 2,500; Referee: Albert Meerum-Terwogt (Netherlands)

27 June 1912 International Friendly	Sweden	7 – 1	Finland	Solna, Sweden
20:00 (UTC+1:00)	Lorichs 1', 50', 65'; Dahlström 52', 87'; Persson 80', 88'	Report	Wiberg 38'	Stadium: Råsunda IP; Attendance: 3,000; Referee: Hugo Meisl (Austria)

29 June 1912 1912 Olympic Games; First Round	Sweden	3 – 4 (a.e.t.)	Netherlands	Stockholm, Sweden
19:00 (UTC+1:00)	Swensson 3', 80'; Börjesson 62' (pen.)	Report	Bouvy 26', 47'; Vos 41', 101'	Stadium: Stockholm Olympic Stadium; Attendance: 14,000; Referee: George Simmons (England)

1 July 1912 1912 Olympic Games; Consolation tournament R1	Sweden	0 – 1	Italy	Solna, Sweden
19:00 (UTC+1:00)		Report	Bontadini 30'	Stadium: Råsunda IP; Attendance: 2,500; Referee: Herbert Willing (Netherlands)

3 November 1912 International Friendly	Sweden	4 – 2	Norway	Gothenburg, Sweden
13:00 (UTC+1:00)	Frykman 10'; Swensson 18', 37'; Ekroth 70' (pen.)	Report	Ditlev-Simonsen 21', 55'	Stadium: Valhalla IP; Attendance: 3,000; Referee: Charles von Buchwald (Denmark)

=== 1913 ===
4 May 1913 International Friendly	Russia	1 – 4	Sweden	Moscow, Russia
16:00 (UTC+2:30)	Zhitarev 1'		Howander 36', 59'; Gustafsson 47'; Svensson 85'	Stadium: Sokolniki Sports Club; Attendance: 8,000; Referee: Alexander Schultz (Russia)
Note: Karl Gustafsson set the goal scoring record for Sweden (10 goals)

18 May 1913 International Friendly	Hungary	2 – 0	Sweden	Budapest, Hungary
17:00 (UTC+1:00)	Pataki 87'; Schlosser 89'	Report		Stadium: Üllői út Attendance: 21,000; Referee: Heinrich Retschury (Austria)

25 May 1913 International Friendly	Denmark	8 – 0	Sweden	Copenhagen, Denmark
13:30 (UTC+1:00)	Gyldenstein 17', 56', 61'; Olsen 20', 44'; Wolfhagen 39'; Nielsen 53'; Middelboe 57'	Report		Stadium: Idrætsparken; Attendance: 8,000; Referee: Albert Meerum-Terwogt (Netherlands)

8 June 1913 International Friendly	Sweden	9 – 0	Norway	Stockholm, Sweden
19:30 (UTC+1:00)	Swensson 4', 65'; Bergström 9'; Gustafsson 23', 36', 50', 52'; Ekroth 75', 86'	Report		Stadium: Stockholm Olympic Stadium; Attendance: 10,000; Referee: Ruben Gelbord (Sweden)
Note: Biggest victory of the Sweden football team at the time, and Karl Gustafsson set the goal scoring record for Sweden (14 goals)

5 October 1913 International Friendly	Sweden	0 – 10	Denmark	Stockholm, Sweden
13:30 (UTC+1:00)		Report	Nielsen 5', 10', 29', 47', 50', 53'; Wolfhagen 63', 85'; Knudsen 40', 70'	Stadium: Stockholm Olympic Stadium; Attendance: 10,000; Referee: George Miller (England)

26 October 1913 International Friendly	Norway	1 – 1	Sweden	Oslo, Norway
13:00 (UTC+1:00)	Skou 60' (pen.)	Report	Olsson 80'	Stadium: Bislett Stadion; Attendance: 10,000; Referee: Charles von Buchwald (Denmark)

=== 1914 ===
24 May 1914 International Friendly	Sweden	4 – 3	Finland	Solna, Sweden
14:00 (UTC+1:00)	Bergström 22'; Swensson 59', 82'; Gunnarsson 85'	Report	Schybergson 35', 62'; Johansson 48'	Stadium: Råsunda IP; Attendance: 2,000; Referee: August Heiberg Kahrs (Norway)

10 June 1914 International Friendly	Sweden	1 – 5	England	Solna, Sweden
	Börjesson 89'	Report	Moore 5', 80'; Woodward 38'; Sharpe 62' (pen.); Prince 85'	Stadium: Råsunda IP; Attendance: 5,000; Referee: Herman Tromp (Netherlands)

21 June 1914 International Friendly	Sweden	1 – 1	Hungary	Solna, Sweden
17:00 (UTC+1:00)	Börjesson 50'	Report	Schlosser 30'	Stadium: Råsunda IP; Attendance: 5,000; Referee: Albert Meerum-Terwogt (Netherlands)

28 June 1914 International Friendly	Norway	0 – 1	Sweden	Oslo, Norway
17:00 (UTC+1:00)		Report	Hjelm 60'	Stadium: Frogner Stadion; Attendance: 8,000; Referee: Hagbard Vestergaard (Denmark)

5 July 1914 International Friendly	Sweden	2 – 2	Russia	Solna, Sweden
17:00 (UTC+1:00)	Wicksell 70'; Swensson 87'	Report	Zhitarev 51', 53'	Stadium: Råsunda IP; Attendance: 8,000; Referee: Hjalmar Bohlin (Sweden)

25 October 1914 International Friendly	Sweden	7 – 0	Norway	Solna, Sweden
13:00 (UTC+1:00)	Ekroth 5', 80', 86'; Söderberg 20', 65', 68'; Johansson 47'	Report		Stadium: Råsunda IP; Attendance: 5,000; Referee: Hagbard Vestergaard (Denmark)

=== 1915 ===
6 June 1915 International Friendly	Denmark	2 – 0	Sweden	Copenhagen, Denmark
13:30 (UTC+1:00)	Olsen 47'; Nielsen 62'	Report		Stadium: Idrætspark; Attendance: 11,000; Referee: Herman Tromp (Netherlands)

27 June 1915 International Friendly	Norway	1 – 1	Sweden	Oslo, Norway
13:00 (UTC+1:00)	Engebretsen 44'	Report	Gunnarsson 82'	Stadium: Frogner stadion Attendance: 10,000; Referee: Hagbard Vestergaard (Denmark)

24 October 1915 International Friendly	Sweden	5 – 2	Norway	Stockholm, Sweden
13:30 (UTC+1:00)	Swensson 10', 14', 61'; Gunnarsson 44', 77'	Report	Ditlev-Simonsen 65'; Wold 85' (pen.)	Stadium: Stockholm Olympic Stadium; Attendance: 8,000; Referee: Hagbard Vestergaard (Denmark)

31 October 1915 International Friendly	Sweden	0 – 2	Denmark	Stockholm, Sweden
13:30 (UTC+1:00)		Report	Nielsen 4'; Rohde 30'	Stadium: Stockholm Olympic Stadium; Attendance: 15,000; Referee: Albert Meerum Terwogt (Netherlands)

=== 1916 ===
4 June 1916 International Friendly	Denmark	2 – 0	Sweden	Copenhagen, Denmark
13:30 (UTC+2:00)	Nielsen 19', 48'	Report		Stadium: Idrætspark; Attendance: 20,000; Referee: Herman Tromp (Netherlands)

2 July 1916 International Friendly	Sweden	6 – 0	Norway	Stockholm, Sweden
14:00 (UTC+2:00)	Karlstrand 25'; Gustafsson 30', 61', 80'; Wicksell 50'; Swensson 65'	Report		Stadium: Stockholm Olympic Stadium; Attendance: 6,000; Referee: Hagbard Vestergaard (Denmark)
Note: Karl Gustafsson set the goal scoring record for Sweden (17 goals)

20 August 1916 International Friendly	Sweden	2 – 3	United States	Stockholm, Sweden
14:00 (UTC+2:00)	Törnqvist 7', 81'	Report	Spalding 22'; Ellis 53'; Cooper 68'	Stadium: Stockholm Olympic Stadium; Attendance: 15,000; Referee: Hagbard Vestergaard (Denmark)
Note: This was USA's first ever official game

1 October 1916 International Friendly	Norway	0 – 0	Sweden	Oslo, Norway
13:00 (UTC+1:00)		Report		Stadium: Frogner stadion Attendance: 12,000; Referee: Hagbard Vestergaard (Denmark)

8 October 1916 International Friendly	Sweden	4 – 0	Denmark	Stockholm, Sweden
14:00 (UTC+1:00)	Karlstrand 3'; Gustafsson 28'; Swensson 49'; Bergström 75'	Report		Stadium: Stockholm Olympic Stadium; Attendance: 18,000; Referee: Albert Meerum Terwogt (Netherlands)
Note: Karl Gustafsson set the goal scoring record for Sweden (18 goals)

=== 1917 ===
3 June 1917 International Friendly	Denmark	1 – 1	Sweden	Copenhagen, Denmark
13:30 (UTC+1:00)	Nielsen 68'	Report	Börjesson 43'	Stadium: Idrætspark; Attendance: 25,000; Referee: Hagbard Vestergaard (Denmark)

19 August 1917 International Friendly	Sweden	3 – 3	Norway	Helsingborg, Sweden
13:30 (UTC+1:00)	Ström 15', 47'; Malm 54'	Report	Aas 22'; Gundersen 64', 81'	Stadium: Olympiastadion; Attendance: 4,000; Referee: Hagbard Vestergaard (Denmark)

16 September 1917 International Friendly	Norway	0 – 2	Sweden	Oslo, Norway
13:00 (UTC+1:00)	Ekroth 8'; Gustafsson 77'	Report		Stadium: Frogner stadion Attendance: 12,000; Referee: Hagbard Vestergaard (Denmark)
Note: Karl Gustafsson set the goal scoring record for Sweden (19 goals)

14 October 1917 International Friendly	Sweden	1 – 2	Denmark	Stockholm, Sweden
14:00 (UTC+1:00)	Gustafsson 47'	Report	Olsen 20'; Grøthan 79'	Stadium: Stockholm Olympic Stadium; Attendance: 20,000; Referee: Albert Meerum Terwogt (Netherlands)
Note: Karl Gustafsson set the goal scoring record for Sweden (20 goals)

=== 1918 ===
26 May 1918 International Friendly	Sweden	2 – 0	Norway	Stockholm, Sweden
13:30 (UTC+1:00)	Gustafsson 23'; Sterne 73'	Report		Stadium: Stockholm Olympic Stadium; Attendance: 10,000; Referee: Hagbard Vestergaard (Denmark)
Note: Karl Gustafsson set the goal scoring record for Sweden (21 goals)

2 June 1918 International Friendly	Denmark	3 – 0	Sweden	Copenhagen, Denmark
13:30 (UTC+1:00)	Hansen 27', 52'; Nielsen 73'	Report		Stadium: Idrætspark; Attendance: 22,000; Referee: Per Christian Andersen (Norway)

15 September 1918 International Friendly	Norway	2 – 1	Sweden	Oslo, Norway
13:00 (UTC+1:00)	Gundersen 49', 55'	Report	Börjesson 68'	Stadium: Frogner stadion Attendance: 12,000; Referee: Hagbard Vestergaard (Denmark)

20 October 1918 International Friendly	Sweden	1 – 2	Norway	Gothenburg, Sweden
13:00 (UTC+1:00)	Hjelm 54'	Report	Laursen 35'; Aaby 80'	Stadium: Ullevi Stadion; Attendance: 10,960; Referee: Per Christian Andersen (Norway)

=== 1919 ===
29 May 1919 International Friendly	Sweden	1 – 0	Finland	Stockholm, Sweden
13:30 (UTC+1:00)	Svedberg 71' (pen.)	Report		Stadium: Stockholm Olympic Stadium; Attendance: 8,000; Referee: Hagbard Vestergaard (Denmark)

5 June 1919 International Friendly	Denmark	3 – 0	Sweden	Copenhagen, Denmark
14:00 (UTC+1:00)	Nielsen 8', 60'; Thorsteinsson 34'	Report		Stadium: Idrætspark; Attendance: 22,000; Referee: Job Mutters (Netherlands)

9 June 1919 International Friendly	Netherlands	3 – 1	Sweden	Amsterdam, Netherlands
15:30 (UTC+1:20)	Brokmann 82'; Dé Kessler 83'; Gupffert 87'	Report	Carlsson 22'	Stadium: Old Stadion; Attendance: 32,280; Referee: Jack Howcroft (England)

29 June 1919 International Friendly	Norway	4 – 3	Sweden	Oslo, Norway
13:00 (UTC+1:00)	Engebretsen 2', 80'; Gundersen 6'; Wold 47'	Report	Carlsson 26'; Aulie 58' (o.g.); Bergström 63'	Stadium: Gressbanen; Attendance: 14,000; Referee: Hagbard Vestergaard (Denmark)

24 August 1919 International Friendly	Sweden	4 – 1	Netherlands	Stockholm, Sweden
14:00 (UTC+1:00)	Carlsson 6', 20', 43'; Svedberg 7'	Report	Buitenweg 31'	Stadium: Stockholm Olympic Stadium; Attendance: 10,000; Referee: Hagbard Vestergaard (Denmark)

14 September 1919 International Friendly	Sweden	1 – 5	Norway	Gothenburg, Sweden
13:00 (UTC+1:00)	Svedberg 8'	Report	Engebretsen 20', 21', 32'; Wold 54'; Gundersen 80'	Stadium: Ullevi Stadion; Attendance: 12,000; Referee: Hagbard Vestergaard (Denmark)

28 September 1919 International Friendly	Finland	3 – 3	Sweden	Helsinki, Finland
13:00 (UTC+1:40)	Wickström 22', 37'; Thorn 75'	Report	Kock 78', 88'; Arontzon 83'	Stadium: Töölön Pallokenttä; Attendance: 4,500; Referee: Hagbard Vestergaard (Denmark)

12 October 1919 International Friendly	Sweden	3 – 0	Denmark	Stockholm, Sweden
13:30 (UTC+1:00)	Carlsson 2', 35', 88'	Report		Stadium: Stockholm Olympic Stadium; Attendance: 18,663; Referee: Jack Howcroft (England)

== See also ==
- Sweden men's national football team results (1920–1939)
- Sweden men's national football team results (1940–1959)
- Sweden men's national football team results (1960–1979)
- Sweden men's national football team results (1980–1989)
- Sweden men's national football team results (1990–1999)
- Sweden men's national football team results (2000–2009)
- Sweden men's national football team results (2010–2019)
- Sweden men's national football team results (2020–present)
