= 1926 in Norwegian football =

Football in Norway
Men's football
- NM: Odd

Results from Norwegian football in 1926.

== Class A of local association leagues ==
Class A of local association leagues (kretsserier) is the predecessor of a national league competition.

League	Champion
Østfold	Sarpsborg
Oslo	Lyn
Follo	Ski
Aker	Bygdø
Lillestrøm og omegn	Lillestrøm SK
Øvre Romerike	Sørumsand
Eidsvoll og omegn	Eidsvold IF
Hamar og omegn	Fremad
Opland	Lyn (Gjøvik)
Glommendalen	Kongsvinger
Nordre Østerdalen	Tynset
Trysil og Engerdal	Nybergsund
Røyken og Hurum	Roy
Øvre Buskerud	Hokksund
Drammen og omegn	Strømsgodset
Vestfold	Larvik Turn
Grenland	Odd
Øvre Telemark	Rjukan
Aust-Agder	Grane (Arendal)
Vest-Agder	Donn
Rogaland	Viking
Hordaland	Voss
Bergen	Brann
Sogn og Fjordane	Høyanger
Søndmøre	Rollon
Romsdalske	Braatt
Sør-Trøndelag	Ranheim
Trondhjem	Rapp
Nord-Trøndelag	Neset
Namdal	Namsos
Helgeland	Sandnessjøen
Lofoten og Vesterålen	Narvik/Nor
Troms	Skarp
Finnmark	Spark

== Norwegian Cup ==
=== Final ===
17 October 1926

Odd	3–0	Ørn
Ulrichsen 14', 30', 55'	Report

Ullevaal Stadion, Oslo
Attendance: 16,000
Referee: Finn Grefberg (Frigg)

== National team ==
6 June 1926 Friendly	Finland	2–5	Norway	Helsinki, Finland
18:00 (UTC+2); Match 63	Kanerva 70', 85'	Report	Gundersen 13', 75', 89'; Jacobsen 56'; Andersen 60'	Stadium: Töölön Pallokenttä; Attendance: 4,000; Referee: Knut Lundstedt (Sweden)

9 June 1926 1924–28 Nordic Championship	Sweden	3–2	Norway	Stockholm, Sweden
19:15 (UTC+1); Match 64	Kaufeldt 31'; Rydell 60', 69'	Report	Andersen 19'; Gundersen 26'	Stadium: Olympic Stadium; Attendance: 13,500; Referee: František Cejnar (Czechoslovakia)

19 September 1926 1924–28 Nordic Championship	Norway	2–2	Denmark	Oslo, Norway
12:30 (UTC+1); Match 65	Gundersen 24'; Berstad 35'	Report	Rohde 9', 48'	Stadium: Gressbanen; Attendance: 15,000; Referee: Axel Bergqvist (Sweden)

10 October 1926 Friendly	Norway	3–4	Poland	Fredrikstad, Norway
13:00 (UTC+1); Match 66	Steen 42', 76'; Andersen 54'	Report	Balcer 58', 86'; Kałuża 62', 63'	Stadium: Fredrikstad Idræts- og Fotbaldplads; Attendance: 5,000; Referee: Lauritz Andersen (Denmark)
