= 1923 in Norwegian football =

Football in Norway
Men's football
- NM: Brann

Results from Norwegian football in 1923.

== Class A of local association leagues ==
Class A of local association leagues (kretsserier) is the predecessor of a national league competition.

League	Champion
Østfold	Kvik (Fredrikshald)
Kristiania	Mercantile
Follo	Oppegård
Aker	Stabæk
Lillestrøm og omegn	Lillestrøm SK
Øvre Romerike	Haga
Eidsvoll og omegn	Eidsvold IF
Hamar og omegn	Hamar IL
Opland	Lyn (Gjøvik)
Glommendalen	Kongsvinger
Nordre Østerdalen	Tynset
Trysil og Engerdal	Trysilgutten
Øvre Buskerud	Vikersund
Drammen og omegn	Skiold
Vestfold	Fram (Larvik)
Grenland	Odd
Øvre Telemark	Snøgg
Aust-Agder	Grane (Arendal)
Vest-Agder	Donn
Rogaland	Stavanger IF
Hordaland	Voss
Bergen	Brann
Sogn og Fjordane	Høyanger
Søndmøre	Aalesund
Romsdalske	Braatt
Sør-Trøndelag	Ranheim
Trondhjem	Kvik (Trondhjem)
Nord-Trøndelag	Sverre
Helgeland	Mo
Lofoten og Vesterålen	Narvik/Nor
Troms	Harstad
Finnmark	Kirkenes

== Norwegian Cup ==
=== Final ===
14 October 1923

Brann	2–1	Lyn
Johnsen 32', 53'	Report	Aas 41'

Odd gressbane, Skien
Attendance: 8,000
Referee: Karl August Andersen (Kvik (Fredrikshald))

== National team ==
17 June 1923 Friendly	Norway	3–0	Finland	Aker, Norway
12:30 (UTC+1); Match 50	Strøm 29', 60'; Johnsen 75'	Report		Stadium: Gressbanen; Attendance: 12,000; Referee: John Fowler (England)

21 June 1923 Friendly	Norway	2–2	Switzerland	Aker, Norway
19:30 (UTC+1); Match 51	Berstad 62'; Johnsen 68'	Report	Afflerbach 38'; Charpillod 40'	Stadium: Gressbanen; Attendance: 10,000; Referee: John Fowler (England)

16 September 1923 Friendly	Norway	2–3	Sweden	Aker, Norway
12:30 (UTC+1); Match 52	Wilhelms 28'; Ulrichsen 65' (pen.)	Report	Kaufeldt 52'; Kock 73'; Rydell 80'	Stadium: Gressbanen; Attendance: 14,000; Referee: Lauritz Andersen (Denmark)

30 September 1923 Friendly	Denmark	2–1	Norway	Copenhagen, Denmark
13:30 (UTC+1); Match 53	Blicher 47' (pen.); Jørgensen 53'	Report	Johnsen 22'	Stadium: Københavns Idrætspark; Attendance: 20,000; Referee: Johannes Mutters (Netherlands)

28 October 1923 Friendly	France	0–2	Norway	Paris, France
14:30 (UTC); Match 54		Report	Wilhelms 12'; Berstad 18'	Stadium: Parc des Princes; Attendance: 12,000; Referee: Robert Walton (England)

4 November 1923 Friendly	Germany	1–0	Norway	Hamburg, Germany
(UTC+1); Match 55	Harder 22'	Report		Stadium: Stadion Hoheluft; Attendance: 20,000; Referee: Theo van Zwieteren (Netherlands)
