= 1919 in Norwegian football =

Football in Norway
Men's football
- NM: Odd

Results from Norwegian football in the year 1919.

== Class A of local association leagues ==
Class A of local association leagues (kretsserier) is the predecessor of a national league competition.

League	Champion
Smaalenene	Kvik (Fredrikshald)
Kristiania og omegn, Group 1	Lyn
Kristiania og omegn, Group 2	Frigg
Kristiania og omegn championship	Frigg
Romerike	Eidsvold IF
Oplandene	Fremad
Østerdalen, Group North	Elverum
Østerdalen, Group South	Kongsvinger
Østerdalen championship	Kongsvinger
Vestfold, Group 1	Drafn
Vestfold, Group 2	Ørn
Vestfold championship	Drafn
Grenland, Group 1	Odd
Grenland, Group 2	Urædd
Grenland championship	Odd
Telemark	Rjukan
Sørlandske	Start
Vesterlen	Stavanger IF
Bergen og omegn	Brann
Romsdalske	Aalesund
Trondhjem	Brage
Inn-Trøndelagen	Neset
Nordland	Glimt

== Norwegian Cup ==
=== Final ===
12 October 1919

Odd	1–0	Frigg
Gundersen 13'	Report

Fram sportsplass, Larvik
Attendance: 10,000
Referee: Peder Christian Andersen (Kristiania BK)

== National team ==
12 June 1919 Friendly	Denmark	5–1	Norway	Copenhagen, Denmark
19:00 (UTC+1); Match 31	Nielsen 24', 42', 59'; Rohde 27', 35'	Report	Helgesen 12' (pen.)	Stadium: Københavns Idrætspark; Attendance: 15,000; Referee: Ernst Albihn (Sweden)

29 June 1919 Friendly	Norway	4–3	Sweden	Kristiania, Norway
13:00 (UTC+1); Match 32	Engebretsen 2', 80'; Gundersen 6'; Wold 47'	Report	Karlsson 25'; Aulie 58' (o.g.); Bergström 63'	Stadium: Gressbanen; Attendance: 14,000; Referee: Hagbard Vestergaard (Denmark)

31 August 1919 Friendly	Norway	1–1	Netherlands	Kristiania, Norway
12:30 (UTC+1); Match 33	Engebretsen 67'	Report	Buitenweg 58'	Stadium: Gressbanen; Attendance: 14,000; Referee: Kurt Nilsson (Sweden)

14 September 1919 Friendly	Sweden	1–5	Norway	Gothenburg, Sweden
13:00 (UTC+1); Match 34	Svedberg 8'	Report	Engebretsen 20', 21', 32'; Wold 54'; Gundersen 80'	Stadium: Ullevi; Attendance: 12,000; Referee: Hagbard Vestergaard (Denmark)

21 September 1919 Friendly	Norway	3–2	Denmark	Kristiania, Norway
13:00 (UTC+1); Match 35	Gundersen 11', 82'; Helgesen 77'	Report	Nielsen 18', 72'	Stadium: Gressbanen; Attendance: 12,000; Referee: Ernst Albihn (Sweden)
