= 1924 in Norwegian football =

Football in Norway
Men's football
- NM: Odd

Results from Norwegian football in 1924.

== Class A of local association leagues ==
Class A of local association leagues (kretsserier) is the predecessor of a national league competition.

League	Champion
Østfold	Kvik (Fredrikshald)
Kristiania^{1}	Gjøa
Follo	Ski
Aker	Hasle
Lillestrøm og omegn	Lillestrøm SK
Øvre Romerike	Sørumsand
Eidsvoll og omegn	Eidsvold IF
Hamar og omegn	Hamar IL
Opland	Lyn (Gjøvik)
Glommendalen	Kongsvinger
Nordre Østerdalen	Røros
Trysil og Engerdal	Trysilgutten
Øvre Buskerud	Hokksund
Drammen og omegn	Strømsgodset
Vestfold	Ørn
Grenland	Urædd
Øvre Telemark	Snøgg
Aust-Agder	Grane (Arendal)
Vest-Agder	Start
Rogaland	Stavanger IF
Hordaland	Voss
Bergen	Brann
Sogn og Fjordane	Høyanger
Søndmøre	Aalesund
Romsdalske	Kristiansund
Sør-Trøndelag	Ranheim
Trondhjem	Kvik (Trondhjem)
Nord-Trøndelag^{2}	Sverre
Helgeland	Mosjøen
Lofoten og Vesterålen	Narvik/Nor
Troms	Harstad
Finnmark	Kirkenes

- ^{1}The following season, Kristiania local association changed its name to Oslo.
- ^{2}The following season, Nord-Trøndelag local association split into Namdal and Nord-Trøndelag.

== Norwegian Cup ==
=== Final ===
2 October 1924

Odd	3–0	Mjøndalen
Ulrichsen 25', 58'; Haakonsen 44'	Report

Sorgenfri gressbane, Trondhjem
Attendance: 7,000
Referee: Trygve Høgbergh (Fagerborg)

== National team ==
15 June Friendly	Norway	0–2	Germany	Aker, Norway
12:30 (UTC+1); Match 56		Report	Sutor 18'; Wieder 36'	Stadium: Gressbanen; Attendance: 6,000; Referee: Arthur Björklund (Sweden)

23 August Friendly	Finland	2–0	Norway	Helsinki, Finland
17:50 (UTC+2); Match 57	Kanerva 34'; Fallström 42'	Report		Stadium: Töölön Pallokenttä; Attendance: 3,000; Referee: Ruben Gelbord (Sweden)

14 September 1924–28 Nordic Championship	Norway	1–3	Denmark	Aker, Norway
13:00 (UTC+1); Match 58	Berstad 11' (pen.)	Report	Olsen 21'; Nielsen 26', 31'	Stadium: Gressbanen; Attendance: 15,000; Referee: Eric Ohlsson (Sweden)

21 September 1924–28 Nordic Championship	Sweden	6–1	Norway	Solna, Sweden
14:00 (UTC+1); Match 59	Keller 2'; Kaufeldt 44', 54'; Rydell 78', 86', 89'	Report	Berstad 32'	Stadium: Råsunda IP; Attendance: 8,000; Referee: John Langenus (Belgium)
