= 1924–28 Nordic Football Championship =

Tournament details
- Host countries: Denmark; Norway; Sweden
- Dates: 15 June 1924 – 7 October 1928
- Teams: 3
- Venues: 5 (in 5 host cities)

Final positions
- Champions: Denmark (1st title)
- Runners-up: Sweden
- Third place: Norway

Tournament statistics
- Matches played: 15
- Goals scored: 73 (4.87 per match)
- Top scorer(s): (Sweden) Sven Rydell (15 goals)

The 1924–28 Nordic Football Championship was the first Nordic Football Championship staged. Three Nordic countries participated, Denmark, Norway and Sweden. The tournament was arranged by the Danish Football Association (DBU) which celebrated its 35th anniversary. The trophy was named the Jubilæumspokal (Anniversary Trophy). A total of 15 matches were played and 73 goals scored giving an average of 4.87 goals per match.

== Participants ==
The participants were:

- Denmark
- Sweden
- Norway

== Results ==
=== 1924 ===
15 June 1924
13:00 (UTC+1:00)

Denmark	2-3	Sweden
Olsen 2'; Nilsson 47'	Report	Kaufeldt 59'; Rydell 71', 75'

Idrætsparken, Copenhagen
Attendance: 25,000
Referee: Noel Watson (England)
14 September 1924
13:00 (UTC+1:00)

Norway	1-3	Denmark
Berstad 11' (pen.)	Report	Olsen 21'; Nielsen 26', 31'

Gressbanen, Kristiania
Attendance: 15,000
Referee: Eric Ohlson (Sweden)
21 September 1924
14:00 (UTC+1:00)

Sweden	6-1	Norway
Keller 2'; Kaufeldt 44', 54'; Rydell 66', 78', 89'	Report	Berstad 32'

Råsunda IP, Solna
Attendance: 8,000
Referee: John Langenus (Belgium)

=== 1925 ===
14 June 1925
14:00 (UTC+1:00)

Sweden	0-2	Denmark
	Report	Larsen 37'; Nielsen 65'

Stockholms Stadion, Stockholm
Attendance: 19,000
Referee: Noel Watson (England)
21 June 1925
13:30 (UTC+1:00)

Denmark	5-1	Norway
Nilsson 7', 71'; Nielsen 49'; Rohde 73'; Larsen 81'	Report	Lunde 60'

Idrætsparken, Copenhagen
Attendance: 23,000
Referee: Noel Watson (England)
23 August 1925
12:30 (UTC+1:00)

Norway	3-7	Sweden
Berstad 3', 34'; Strøm 68'	Report	Rydell 22', 42', 44', 62'; Kaufeldt 30', 89'; Haglund 71'

Gressbanen, Oslo
Attendance: 15,000
Referee: Lauritz Andersen (Denmark)

=== 1926 ===
9 June 1926
19:15 (UTC+1:00)

Sweden	3-2	Norway
Kaufeldt 31'; Rydell 60', 69'	Report	Andersen 19'; Gundersen 26'

Stockholms Stadion, Stockholm
Attendance: 13,500
Referee: František Cejnar (Czechoslovakia)
19 September 1926
12:30 (UTC+1:00)

Norway	2-2	Denmark
Gundersen 24'; Berstad 35'	Report	Rohde 9', 48'

Gressbanen, Oslo
Attendance: 15,000
Referee: Axel Bergqvist (Sweden)
3 October 1926
13:30 (UTC+1:00)

Denmark	2-0	Sweden
Bendixen 41' (pen.); Rohde 70'	Report

Idrætsparken, Copenhagen
Attendance: 26,000
Referee: Peco Bauwens (Germany)

=== 1927 ===
19 June 1927
14:00 (UTC+1:00)

Sweden	0-0	Denmark
	Report

Stockholms Stadion, Stockholm
Attendance: 20,000
Referee: John Langenus (Belgium)
26 June 1927
13:00 (UTC+1:00)

Norway	3-5	Sweden
Berstad 5', 80'; Gundersen 89'	Report	Rydell 18', 23', 65'; Olsson 38', 68'

Gressbanen, Oslo
Attendance: 13,000
Referee: Otto Remke (Denmark)
30 October 1927
13:30 (UTC+1:00)

Denmark	3-1	Norway
Jørgensen 48'; Rohde 58'; Hansen 69'	Report	Gundersen 19'

Idrætsparken, Copenhagen
Attendance: 20,000
Referee: Alfred Birlem (Germany)

=== 1928 ===
7 June 1928
19:15 (UTC+1:00)

Sweden	6-1	Norway
Keller 15', 70'; Lundahl 22', 57'; Kroon 28', 76'	Report	Gundersen 55'

Stockholms Stadion, Stockholm
Attendance: 19,000
Referee: Otto Remke (Denmark)
17 June 1928
13:00 (UTC+1:00)

Norway	2-3	Denmark
Berstad 64' (pen.); Andersen 81'	Report	Hansen 66'; Rohde 70'; Jørgensen 72'

Ullevaal, Oslo
Attendance: 18,000
Referee: Vidar Stenborg (Sweden)
7 October 1928
13:30 (UTC+1:00)

Denmark	3-1	Sweden
Rohde 6'; Jørgensen 8'; Nilsson 31'	Report	Rydell 32'

Idrætsparken, Copenhagen
Attendance: 27,500
Referee: Fritz Spranger (Germany)

== Table ==
	Team	Pld	W	D	L	GF	GA	GD	Pts
1	Denmark	10	7	2	1	25	11	+14	16
2	Sweden	10	6	1	3	31	19	+12	13
3	Norway	10	0	1	9	17	43	–26	1

== Winner ==
1924–28 Nordic Football Championship

Denmark
first title

== Statistics ==
=== Goalscorers ===
There were 73 goals scored in 15 matches, for an average of 4.87 goals per match.

15 goals

- (Sweden) Sven Rydell

8 goals

- (Norway) Finn Berstad

7 goals

- (Denmark) Michael Rohde

6 goals

- (Sweden) Per Kaufeldt

4 goals

- (Denmark) Ernst Nilsson
- (Denmark) Poul Nielsen
- (Norway) Einar Gundersen

3 goals

- (Denmark) Pauli Jørgensen
- (Sweden) Tore Keller

2 goals

- (Denmark) Alf Olsen
- (Denmark) Einar Larsen
- (Denmark) Henry Hansen
- (Norway) Herbert Lunde
- (Sweden) Harry Lundahl
- (Sweden) Albert Olsson
- (Sweden) Knut Kroon

1 goal

- (Denmark) Harry Bendixen
- (Norway) Johnny Helgesen
- (Norway) Arne Andersen
- (Norway) Sigurd Andersen
- (Sweden) Algot Haglund

== See also ==
Balkan Cup
Baltic Cup
Central European International Cup
Mediterranean Cup
