= List of Norway national football team hat-tricks =

This page is a list of the hat-tricks scored for the Norway national football team. Since Norway's first official international match on 12 July 1908 against Sweden there have been thirty-six recorded hat-tricks. The first international hat-trick was scored by Kaare Engebretsen in 1919 international friendly against the Swedes. The most goals scored by an individual in a single match is five, achieved by Erling Haaland against Moldova.

Haaland also holds the record for most hat-trick scored by a Norwegian international, having scored six. The team which Norway have scored the most hat-tricks against is Finland, scoring ten different hat-tricks.

Norway have conceded fifty-one hat-tricks, with Sweden having scored nineteen. The individual with the most hat-tricks scored against Norway is Poul Nielsen, who scored five different hat-tricks for Denmark. There has been one hat-trick scored against Norway at the FIFA World Cup, achieved by Ousmane Dembélé at the 2026 FIFA World Cup.

== Hat-tricks scored by Norway ==
Scores and results list Norway's goal tally first.

No.	Player	Date	Opponent	Venue	Goals	Result	Competition	Ref.
1	Kaare Engebretsen	14 September 1919	Sweden	Gamla Ullevi, Gothenburg, Sweden	3 – (20', 21', 32')	5–1	Friendly	
2	Einar Gundersen	6 June 1926	Finland	Töölön Pallokenttä, Helsinki, Finland	3 – (13', 75', 89')	5–2	Friendly	
3	Jørgen Juve	12 June 1929	Netherlands	Ullevaal Stadion, Oslo, Norway	3 – (40', 43', 60')	4–4	Friendly	
4	Jørgen Juve (2)	18 June 1929	Finland	Ullevaal Stadion, Oslo, Norway	3 – (8', 15', 73')	4–0	1929–32 Nordic Football Championship	
5	Jørgen Juve (3)	1 June 1930	Finland	Ullevaal Stadion, Oslo, Norway	3 – (17', 42', 66')	6–2	1929–32 Nordic Football Championship	
6	Jørgen Juve (4)	6 July 1930	Sweden	Stockholm Olympic Stadium, Stockholm, Sweden	3 – (16', 42', 47')	3–6	1929–32 Nordic Football Championship	
7	Jørgen Juve (5)	3 September 1933	Finland	Töölön Pallokenttä, Helsinki, Finland	3 – (20', 36', 46')	5–1	1933–36 Nordic Football Championship	
8	Odd Hoel	8 September 1935	Finland	Töölön Pallokenttä, Helsinki, Finland	3 – (23', 52', 62')	5–1	1933–36 Nordic Football Championship	
9	Reidar Kvammen	26 July 1936	Sweden	Stockholm Olympic Stadium, Stockholm, Sweden	3 – (17', 29', 65')	4–3	Friendly	
10	Arne Brustad	13 August 1936	Poland	Olympiastadion, Berlin, Germany	3 – (15', 23', 84')	3–2	1936 Summer Olympics	
11	Arne Brustad (2)	17 June 1938	Finland	Ullevaal Stadion, Oslo, Norway	4 – (11', 22', 25', 33')	9–0	1937–47 Nordic Football Championship	
12	Gunnar Thoresen	28 June 1946	Finland	Brann Stadion, Bergen, Norway	3 – (15', 20', 62')	12–0	Friendly	
13	Paul Sæthrang	28 June 1946	Finland	Brann Stadion, Bergen, Norway	3 – (17', 32', 69')	12–0	Friendly	
14	Odd Wang Sørensen	6 August 1948	United States	Bislett Stadium, Oslo, Norway	5 – (3', 8', 27', 29', 47')	11–0	Friendly	
15	Gunnar Thoresen (2)	6 August 1948	United States	Bislett Stadium, Oslo, Norway	3 – (25', 57', 85')	11–0	Friendly	
16	Kjell Kristiansen	31 August 1952	Finland	Ullevaal Stadion, Oslo, Norway	3 – (36', 47', 75')	7–2	1952–55 Nordic Football Championship	
17	Harald Hennum	13 August 1958	East Germany	Ullevaal Stadion, Oslo, Norway	4 – (10', 24', 35', 47')	6–5	Friendly	
18	Olav Nilsen	3 July 1962	Malta	Lerkendal Stadion, Trondheim, Norway	3 – (28', 81', 85')	5–0	Friendly	
19	Harald Berg	19 May 1965	Thailand	Brann Stadion, Bergen, Norway	3 – (49', 72', 78')	7–0	Friendly	
20	Pål Jacobsen	21 August 1980	Finland	Ullevaal Stadion, Oslo, Norway	4 – (30', 39', 72', 84')	6–1	1978–80 Nordic Football Championship	
21	Øyvind Leonhardsen	4 February 1992	Bermuda	Bermuda National Stadium, Devonshire Parish, Bermuda	3 – (31', 55', 63')	3–1	Friendly	
22	Gunnar Halle	9 September 1992	San Marino	Ullevaal Stadion, Oslo, Norway	3 – (6', 52', 69')	10–0	1994 FIFA World Cup qualification	
23	Jan Åge Fjørtoft	30 March 1993	Qatar	Khalifa International Stadium, Al Rayyan, Qatar	3 – (43', 51', 59')	6–1	Friendly	
24	Kjetil Rekdal	9 October 1996	Hungary	Ullevaal Stadion, Oslo, Norway	3 – (83', 89', 90' pen)	3–0	1998 FIFA World Cup qualification	
25	Tore André Flo	29 March 1997	United Arab Emirates	Sharjah Stadium, Sharjah, United Arab Emirates	3 – (2', 38', 66')	4–1	Friendly	
26	Steffen Iversen	21 November 2007	Malta	National Stadium, Ta' Qali, Malta	3 – (25', 27' pen, 45')	4–1	UEFA Euro 2008 qualifying	
27	Mohamed Elyounoussi	5 October 2017	San Marino	San Marino Stadium, Serravalle, San Marino	3 – (39', 48', 68')	8–0	2018 FIFA World Cup qualification	
28	Ola Kamara	23 March 2018	Australia	Ullevaal Stadion, Oslo, Norway	3 – (36', 57', 91')	4–1	Friendly	
29	Erling Haaland	11 October 2020	Romania	Ullevaal Stadion, Oslo, Norway	3 – (13', 64', 74')	4–0	2020–21 UEFA Nations League B	
30	Erling Haaland (2)	7 September 2021	Gibraltar	Ullevaal Stadion, Oslo, Norway	3 – (27', 39', 91')	5–1	2022 FIFA World Cup qualification	
31	Joshua King	29 March 2022	Armenia	Ullevaal Stadion, Oslo, Norway	3 – (28' pen, 33', 59')	9–0	Friendly	
32	Erling Haaland (3)	5 June 2024	Kosovo	Ullevaal Stadion, Oslo, Norway	3 – (15', 70', 75')	3–0	Friendly	
33	Erling Haaland (4)	17 November 2024	Kazakhstan	Ullevaal Stadion, Oslo, Norway	3 – (23', 37', 71')	5–0	2024–25 UEFA Nations League B	
34	Erling Haaland (5)	9 September 2025	Moldova	Ullevaal Stadion, Oslo, Norway	5 – (11', 36', 43', 52', 83')	11–1	2026 FIFA World Cup qualification	
35	Thelo Aasgaard	9 September 2025	Moldova	Ullevaal Stadion, Oslo, Norway	4 – (67', 76', 79' pen, 91')	11–1	2026 FIFA World Cup qualification	
36	Erling Haaland (6)	11 October 2025	Israel	Ullevaal Stadion, Oslo, Norway	3 – (27', 63', 72')	5–0	2026 FIFA World Cup qualification	

== Hat-tricks conceded by Norway ==
Scores and results list Norway's goal tally first.

No.	Player	Date	Opponent	Venue	Goals	Result	Competition	Ref.
1	Erik Bergström	12 July 1908	Sweden	Gothenburg, Sweden	4 – (27', 29', 44', 89')	3–11	Friendly	
2	Erik Börjesson	12 July 1908	Sweden	Gothenburg, Sweden	4 – (24', 60', 75', 86')	3–11	Friendly	
3	Sándor Bodnár	23 June 1912	Hungary	Frogner stadion, Oslo, Norway	3 – (49', 71', 73')	0–6	Friendly	
4	Anthon Olsen	30 June 1912	Denmark	Råsunda IP, Solna, Sweden	3 – (4', 70', 88')	0–7	1912 Summer Olympics	
5	Karl Gustafsson	8 June 1913	Sweden	Stockholm Olympic Stadium, Stockholm, Sweden	4 – (23', 36', 50', 52')	0–9	Friendly	
6	Sten Söderberg	25 October 1914	Sweden	Råsunda IP, Solna, Sweden	3 – (20', 65', 68')	0–7	Friendly	
7	Helge Ekroth	25 October 1914	Sweden	Råsunda IP, Solna, Sweden	3 – (5', 80', 86')	0–7	Friendly	
8	Poul Nielsen	19 September 1915	Denmark	Idrætsparken, Copenhagen, Denmark	3 – (23', 37', 71')	1–8	Friendly	
9	Anthon Olsen	19 September 1915	Denmark	Idrætsparken, Copenhagen, Denmark	3 – (28', 65', 77')	1–8	Friendly	
10	Ivar Svensson	24 October 1915	Sweden	Stockholm Olympic Stadium, Stockholm, Sweden	3 – (10', 14', 61')	2–5	Friendly	
11	Karl Gustafsson (2)	2 July 1916	Sweden	Stockholm Olympic Stadium, Stockholm, Sweden	3 – (30', 61', 80')	0–6	Friendly	
12	Poul Nielsen (2)	15 October 1916	Denmark	Idrætsparken, Copenhagen, Denmark	4 – (25', 40, 47', 70')	0–8	Friendly	
13	Michael Rohde	15 October 1916	Denmark	Idrætsparken, Copenhagen, Denmark	3 – (2', 10', 57')	0–8	Friendly	
14	Victor Klein	7 October 1917	Denmark	Idrætsparken, Copenhagen, Denmark	3 – (10', 14', 30')	0–12	Friendly	
15	Poul Nielsen (3)	7 October 1917	Denmark	Idrætsparken, Copenhagen, Denmark	5 – (70', 74', 76', 78', 80')	0–12	Friendly	
16	Poul Nielsen (4)	12 June 1919	Denmark	Idrætsparken, Copenhagen, Denmark	3 – (24', 42', 59')	1–5	Friendly	
17	Antonín Janda	29 August 1920	Czechoslovakia	La Butte, Brussels, Belgium	3 – (17', 66', 77')	0–4	1920 Summer Olympics	
18	Poul Nielsen (5)	2 October 1921	Denmark	Idrætsparken, Copenhagen, Denmark	3 – (7', 51', 75')	1–3	Friendly	
19	Albin Dahl	24 September 1922	Sweden	Gressbanen, Oslo, Norway	3 – (30', 40', 75')	0–5	Friendly	
20	Sven Rydell	21 September 1924	Sweden	Råsunda IP, Solna, Sweden	3 – (66', 78', 89')	1–6	1924–28 Nordic Football Championship	
21	Sven Rydell (2)	23 August 1925	Sweden	Gressbanen, Oslo, Norway	4 – (22', 42', 44', 62')	3–7	1924–28 Nordic Football Championship	
22	Sven Rydell (3)	26 June 1927	Sweden	Gressbanen, Oslo, Norway	3 – (18', 23', 65')	3–5	1924–28 Nordic Football Championship	
23	Harry Lundahl	6 July 1930	Sweden	Stockholm Olympic Stadium, Stockholm, Sweden	3 – (5', 13', 48')	3–6	1929–32 Nordic Football Championship	
24	Otto Siffling	24 October 1937	Germany	Olympiastadion, Berlin, Germany	3 – (19', 29', 67')	0–3	Friendly	
25	Pauli Jørgensen	18 June 1939	Denmark	Idrætsparken, Copenhagen, Denmark	3 – (3', 54', 80')	3–6	Friendly	
26	Gunnar Nordahl	21 October 1945	Sweden	Råsunda Stadium, Solna, Sweden	4 – (12', 26', 82', 89')	0–10	Friendly	
27	Karl Aage Hansen	20 October 1946	Denmark	Idrætsparken, Copenhagen, Denmark	4 – (20', 52', 78', 89')	1–7	Friendly	
28	Gunnar Nordahl (2)	28 June 1947	Sweden	Helsinki Olympic Stadium, Helsinki, Finland	4 – (18', 56', 59', 85')	1–5	Friendly	
29	Gunnar Nordahl (3)	19 September 1948	Sweden	Ullevaal Stadion, Oslo, Norway	5 – (24', 44', 62', 74', 80')	3–5	1948–51 Nordic Football Championship	
30	Ernest Pohl	28 October 1956	Poland	10th-Anniversary Stadium, Warsaw, Poland	4 – (6', 11', 38', 90')	3–5	Friendly	
31	Hristo Iliev	3 November 1957	Bulgaria	Vasil Levski National Stadium, Sofia, Bulgaria	3 – (6', 60', 74')	0–7	1958 FIFA World Cup qualification	
32	Günter Schröter	13 August 1958	East Germany	Ullevaal Stadion, Oslo, Norway	3 – (6', 36', 44')	6–5	Friendly	
33	Rune Börjesson	18 October 1959	Sweden	Ullevi, Gothenburg, Sweden	3 – (26', 48', 75')	2–6	Friendly	
34	Tonny van der Linden	4 November 1959	Netherlands	De Kuip, Rotterdam, Netherlands	3 – (38', 77', 85')	1–7	Friendly	
35	Ole Madsen	11 June 1962	Denmark	Idrætsparken, Copenhagen, Denmark	3 – (25', 45', 87')	1–6	1960–63 Nordic Football Championship	
36	Denis Law	4 June 1963	Scotland	Brann Stadion, Bergen, Norway	3 – (14', 22', 76')	4–3	Friendly	
37	Denis Law (2)	7 November 1963	Scotland	Hampden Park, Glasgow, Scotland	4 – (19', 42', 60', 78')	1–6	Friendly	
38	Jimmy Greaves	29 June 1966	England	Ullevaal Stadion, Oslo, Norway	4 – (20', 24', 44', 74')	1–6	Friendly	
39	Tom Turesson	18 September 1966	Sweden	Ullevaal Stadion, Oslo, Norway	3 – (60', 63', 70')	2–4	1964–67 Nordic Football Championship	
40	Erik Dyreborg	24 September 1967	Denmark	Ullevaal Stadion, Oslo, Norway	5 – (40', 41', 57', 60', 63')	0–5	1964–67 Nordic Football Championship	
41	Andrzej Jarosik	9 June 1968	Poland	Ullevaal Stadion, Oslo, Norway	3 – (21', 38', 55')	1–6	Friendly	
42	Tommy Troelsen	23 June 1968	Denmark	Idrætsparken, Copenhagen, Denmark	3 – (22', 24', 77' pen)	1–5	1968–71 Nordic Football Championship	
43	Ove Kindvall	9 October 1968	Sweden	Råsunda Stadium, Solna, Sweden	3 – (37', 58', 61')	0–5	1970 FIFA World Cup qualification	
44	Hervé Revelli	10 September 1969	France	Ullevaal Stadion, Oslo, Norway	3 – (9', 48', 77')	1–3	1970 FIFA World Cup qualification	
45	Gerd Müller	22 June 1971	West Germany	Ullevaal Stadion, Oslo, Norway	3 – (30', 47', 52')	1–7	Friendly	
46	Johan Neeskens	1 November 1972	Netherlands	De Kuip, Rotterdam, Netherlands	3 – (31', 51', 63')	0–9	1974 FIFA World Cup qualification	
47	Russell Latapy	29 November 1995	Trinidad and Tobago	Queen's Park Oval, Port of Spain, Trinidad and Tobago	3 – (24' pen, 45', 53' pen)	2–3	Friendly	
48	Taylor Twellman	29 January 2006	United States	Home Depot Center, Carson, United States	3 – (5', 17', 76')	0–5	Friendly	
49	Zlatan Ibrahimović	14 August 2013	Sweden	Friends Arena, Stockholm, Sweden	3 – (2', 28', 57')	2–4	Friendly	
50	Milivoje Novaković	11 October 2013	Slovenia	Ljudski vrt, Maribor, Slovenia	3 – (13', 15', 49')	0–3	2014 FIFA World Cup qualification	
51	Ousmane Dembélé	26 June 2026	France	Boston Stadium, Foxborough, United States	3 – (7', 20', 32')	1–4	2026 FIFA World Cup	
