= 1923 Norwegian Football Cup =

Norgesmesterskapet i fotball for menn 1923

Tournament details
- Country: Norway
- Teams: 84

Final positions
- Champions: Brann (1st title)
- Runners-up: Lyn

The 1923 Norwegian Football Cup was the 22nd season of the Norwegian annual knockout football tournament. The tournament was open for all members of NFF. Brann won their first title, having beaten Lyn in the final. Odd were the defending champions, but were eliminated by Lyn in the semifinal.

== First round ==
Team 1	Score	Team 2
Aalesund	8–0	Hødd
Bøn	1–0	Lillestrøm BK
Djerv	3–2	Hardy
Dokken	0–4	Ready
Drafn	6–0	Tønsberg Turn
Eidsvold	1–2	Trygg
Fredrikstad	w/o	Hasle
Fremad	4–1	Fagforeningenes IL (Hamar)
Gjøa	4–5	Sarpsborg
Hamar	2–2 (a.e.t.) (Note: The replay was moved to the second round.)	Raufoss
Kjapp	2–1 (a.e.t.)	Skotfos
Kristiansund	4–1	Braatt
Kvik (Fredrikshald)	9–0	Ski
Larvik Turn	1–0	Urædd
Lillestrøm	2–1	Vaalerengen
Mercantile	0–3	Falk
Mercur	0–3	Kvik (Trondhjem)
Mjøndalen	3–0	Tell
Molde	3–4	Rollon
Moss	8–0	Oppegård
Nordstrand	0–7	Sportsklubben av 1910
Norrøna	1–4	Frigg
Odd	3–0	Sandefjord
Pors	0–5	Ørn
Røros	7–0	Tyldal
Skiold	4–1	Agnes
Slemmestad	1–3	Drammen
Stavanger	4–1	Viking
Snøgg	1–1 (a.e.t.)	Strømsgodset
Stabæk	3–7	Lyn
Start	3–2	Flekkefjord
Stenkjær	0–4	Freidig
Sverre	1–0	Rapp
Torp	1–0	Hafslund
Tryggkameratene	4–2	Neset
Tynset	6–1	Rendalen
Tønsberg-Kameratene	0–4	Storm
Vidar	1–4	Brann
Vigør	3–4 (a.e.t.)	Grane
Vikersund	0–7	Fram (Larvik)
Brage	Bye	
Brodd	Bye	
Donn	Bye	
Lyn (Gjøvik)	Bye	

== Second round ==
Team 1	Score	Team 2
Bøn	2–2 (a.e.t.) (Note: The replay was moved to the third round.)	Fremad
Djerv	0–2	Brodd
Drammen	1–4	Lillestrøm
Falk	4–1	Torp
Freidig	4–3 (a.e.t.)	Sverre
Grane	6–4 (Note: Start protested and the replay was moved to the third round.)	Start
Hamar	4–0	Raufoss
Kristiansund	2–4	Aalesund
Larvik Turn	5–0	Donn
Lyn (Gjøvik)	10–1	Tynset
Mjøndalen	4–0	Kjapp
Ready	0–7	Fredrikstad
Rollon	0–4	Brage
Røros	0–2	Tryggkameratene
Strømsgodset	3–0	Snøgg
Trygg	1–2	Skiold
Brann	Bye	
Drafn	Bye	
Fram (Larvik)	Bye	
Frigg	Bye	
Kvik (Fredrikshald)	Bye	
Kvik (Trondhjem)	Bye	
Lyn	Bye	
Moss	Bye	
Odd	Bye	
Sarpsborg	Bye	
Sportsklubben av 1910	Bye	
Stavanger	Bye	
Storm	Bye	
Ørn	Bye	

== Third round ==
Team 1	Score	Team 2
Brage	11–1	Tryggkameratene
Brann	4–1	Aalesund
Falk	2–4	Odd
Fram (Larvik)	3–0	Sportsklubben av 1910
Fredrikstad	1–4	Sarpsborg
Freidig	4–8	Kvik (Trondhjem)
Fremad	3–0	Bøn
Frigg	2–1	Hamar
Lillestrøm	2–4	Moss
Lyn	3–3 (a.e.t.)	Lyn (Gjøvik)
Mjøndalen	1–3	Drafn
Skiold	0–1	Larvik Turn
Start	2–1	Grane
Stavanger	4–0	Brodd
Storm	1–0 (Note: The result was annulled due to a referee error and Storm withdrew from the replay. Ørn advanced to the fourth round on walkover.)	Ørn
Strømsgodset	0–3	Kvik (Fredrikshald)
Replay
Lyn (Gjøvik)	2–5 (a.e.t.)	Lyn

== Fourth round ==
Team 1	Score	Team 2
Brage	0–3	Lyn
Fram (Larvik)	2–0	Start
Frigg	0–0 (a.e.t.)	Brann
Kvik (Trondhjem)	1–0	Stavanger
Larvik Turn	3–1 (a.e.t.)	Kvik (Fredrikshald)
Moss	3–0	Fremad
Odd	2–1	Ørn
Sarpsborg	1–2	Drafn
Replay
Brann	1–0	Frigg

== Quarter-finals ==
Team 1	Score	Team 2
Drafn	4–1	Fram (Larvik)
Kvik (Trondhjem)	1–4	Brann
Lyn	1–0	Larvik Turn
Odd	3–0	Moss

== Semi-finals ==
Team 1	Score	Team 2
Brann	3–0	Drafn
Lyn	1–0	Odd

== Final ==
14 October 1923

Brann	2–1	Lyn
Johnsen 32', 53'	Report	Aas 41'

Odd gressbane, Skien
Attendance: 8,000
Referee: Karl August Andersen (Kvik (Fredrikshald))

== See also ==
- 1923 in Norwegian football
