= Holmen, Oslo =

Holmen
- Neighbourhood
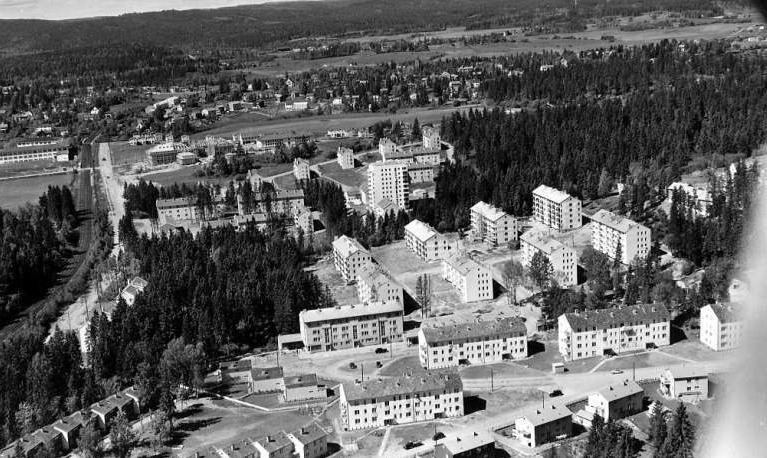
- Holmen with Holmengrenda in the foreground. Photo from Oslo City Archive
- Interactive map of Holmen
- Coordinates: 59.947°N 10.676°E
- Country: Norway
- County: Oslo
- Municipality: Oslo
- Borough: Vestre Aker
- Time zone: UTC+1 (CET)
  - Summer (DST): UTC+2 (CEST)

Holmen is a neighbourhood in Oslo and forms part of the district of Vestre Aker. It is situated between Hovseter in the west and Slemdal in the east, Holmenkollen in the north and Makrellbekken in the south. The name is derived from the Holmen farms.

Vestre Holmen is located west of Holmenkollveien, a secondary road in Norway's road network, extends along Arnebråtveien approximately in the north–south direction and west towards the Røa Line of Oslo Metro. Here are the housing estates of Holmenhaugen and Holmengrenda with terraced houses and detached houses. The building company Holmenbygg AS has erected 13 four-story apartment blocks in Lybekkveien, Stasjonsveien, and Holmengrenda streets.

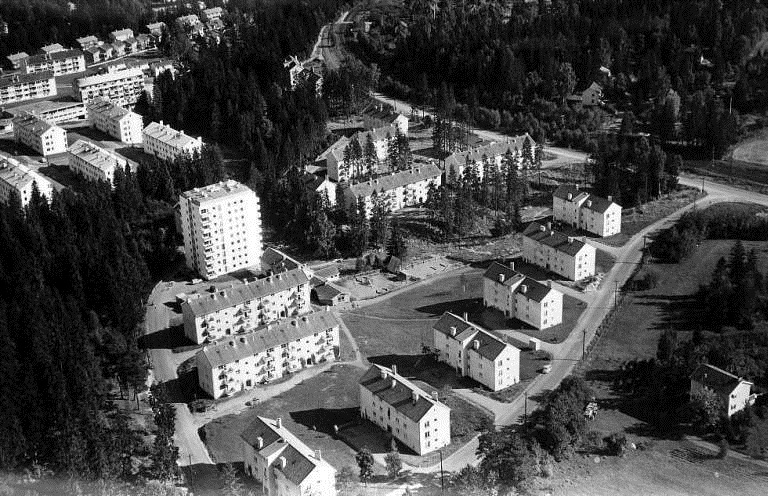
Air Force Housing apartment blocks at Hovseter. Top left: blocks in Lybekkveien and houses in Holmengrenda. Aerial photo from Oslo City Archive

The housing estate of the Royal Norwegian Air Force, also called Snippen, is located further up Stasjonsveien, along Landingsveien, in Luftfartsveien, Flyveien, and Pilotveien. It was designed by the architect Erling Viksjø and was built from 1948 to 1952. The housing company was formed by officers of the Norwegian air force and navy. In 1953 the housing estate was awarded Sundts premie for good architecture. It is included in the Golden list of the Oslo City Antiquarian, the manager of the city's cultural heritage.

Gressbanen, the stadium of the sports club IF Ready, is located at Holmen.

Holmen station was opened on 24 January 1935 together with the Røa Line.
