= Kristian Gyldenstein =

Danish footballer (1886–1954)

Personal information
- Full name: Kristian Georg Asmus Gyldenstein
- Date of birth: 16 July 1886
- Place of birth: Copenhagen, Denmark
- Date of death: 11 January 1954 (aged 67)
- Position: Forward

Senior career*
Years	Team	Apps	(Gls)
1910–1919	Kjøbenhavns Boldklub		

International career
1911–1913	Denmark	3	(3)
- * Club domestic league appearances and goals

Kristian Georg Asmus Gyldenstein (16 July 1886 – 11 January 1954) was a Danish footballer who played as a forward for Kjøbenhavns Boldklub. He made three appearances for the Denmark national team between 1911 and 1913, scoring a hat-trick.

== International career ==
Gyldenstein made his international debut on 21 October 1911, losing 3–0 to the England amateur national team. His only goals for the national team came when he scored the first, sixth, and eighth goals on 25 May 1913, as Denmark beat Sweden 8–0. The final match Gyldenstein was involved in came on 5 October of the same year. Denmark again defeated Sweden, this time by a score of 10–0. Poul Nielsen scored six times and Gyldenstein never played another match for Denmark.
