= Harry Bendixen =

Danish footballer and sports journalist (1901–1954)

Harry Mozart Bendixen (13 October 1901 – 30 December 1954) was a Danish football player and sports journalist. He played 16 games and scored one goal for the Denmark national football team from 1924 to 1928. In club football, he represented Akademisk Boldklub (AB) during his entire career. As a journalist, Bendixen was sports editor at Berlingske Tidende and later the editor-in-chief of B.T. Harry Bendixen was the author of several popular youth books on different sports. He died of an appendicitis.

== Bibliography ==
- Laursen, Valdemar, Poul Jensen and Harry Bendixen, "Tre fra Landsholdet", Gyldendal, 1933.
- Bendixen, Harry, "3-0", Frederik E. Pedersen, 1934.
- Bendixen, Harry, "6 Dages Løbet", Jespersen og Pio, 1936.
- Bendixen, Harry, "I det 89. Minut", Jespersen og Pio, 1937.
- Bendixen, Harry, "Færdig - spring!", Jespersen og Pio, 1937.
- Bendixen, Harry, "Ringen fri!", Jespersen og Pio, 1939.
- Bendixen, Harry, "Alt om Fodbold som det bør spilles.", Copenhagen, 1942.
