= Bjarne Johnsen (footballer) =

Norwegian footballer (1897–1982)

Personal information
- Date of birth: 7 July 1897
- Place of birth: Bergen, Norway
- Date of death: 23 January 1982 (aged 84)
- Place of death: Bergen, Norway
- Position: Forward

Senior career*
Years	Team	Apps	(Gls)
- Brann

International career
1922–1923	Norway	6	(5)
- * Club domestic league appearances and goals

Bjarne Johnsen (7 July 1897 – 23 January 1982) was a Norwegian footballer who played for Brann. He was capped six times for the Norway national football team between 1922 and 1923, scoring five goals.

== Career statistics ==
=== International ===
Appearances and goals by national team and year
National team	Year	Apps	Goals
Norway	1923	5	3
Total		5	3

=== International goals ===
Scores and results list Norway's goal tally first.

No	Date	Venue	Opponent	Score	Result	Competition
1.	25 May 1922	Brann Stadion, Bergen, Norway	Ireland	?–?	2–1	Friendly
2.	25 May 1922	Brann Stadion, Bergen, Norway	Ireland	?–?	2–1	Friendly
3.	17 June 1923	Gressbanen, Oslo, Norway	Finland	3–0	3–0	Friendly
4.	21 June 1923	Gressbanen, Oslo, Norway	Switzerland	2–2	2–2	Friendly
5.	30 September 1923	Københavns Idrætspark, Copenhagen, Denmark	Denmark	1–0	1–2	Friendly
