= Charles Ellis (soccer) =

American soccer player

Personal information
- Full name: Charles Henry Ellis
- Date of birth: 1890
- Date of death: 1954 (aged 63–64)
- Position: Forward

Senior career*
Years	Team	Apps	(Gls)
1908–1914	Columbia Oval		
1914–1917	Brooklyn Celtic		

International career
1916	United States	2	(2)
- * Club domestic league appearances and goals

Charles Henry Ellis (1890–1954) was an American soccer player who is best known for scoring a goal in each of the U.S. national team's first two games.

Ellis played both forward and midfield during his career. His first recorded team was Columbia Oval of the New York State Amateur League for which he played from at least 1908 until 1914. He then moved to Brooklyn Celtic of the New York State Association Football League. Celtic went to the 1915 American Cup final before falling to the Kearny Scots.

In 1916, the United States Football Association (USFA) organized the first games for its national team. USFA was admitted to FIFA in 1913 but World War I prevented the association from playing national team games. However, in 1916, USFA decided to send the team to Scandinavia to play teams from other neutral countries. USFA drew most of its players from the north-east and Ellis was selected to play right midfield. In the first official U.S. game against Sweden on August 20, 1916, Thomas Swords scored the first U.S. goal. Fifteen minutes into the second half, Ellis scored the second U.S. goal in the team's 3–2 victory. Two weeks later, Ellis scored the U.S. goal in a 1–1 tie with Norway. At the end of the tour, a local Stockholm club hired Ellis as its coach. However, he returned to Brooklyn Celtic for the 1917 season.
