= Victor Nysted =

Norwegian footballer (1889-1949)

Personal information
- Date of birth: 21 February 1889
- Date of death: 23 December 1949 (aged 60)

International career
| Years | Team | Apps | (Gls) |
| 1908–1911 | Norway | 2 | (1) |

Victor Nysted (21 February 1889 – 23 December 1949) was a Norwegian footballer. He played in two matches for the Norway national football team in 1908 to 1911.
