= Charles Buchwald =

Danish footballer (1880–1951)

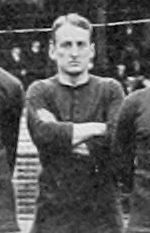
- Buchwald with Denmark at the 1912 Summer Olympics

Personal information
- Full name: Charles von Buchwald
- Date of birth: 22 October 1880
- Place of birth: Bjerringbro, Denmark
- Date of death: 19 November 1951 (aged 71)
- Place of death: Hørsholm, Denmark
- Position: Defender

Senior career*
Years	Team	Apps	(Gls)
1897–1913	AB		
1913	ØB		

International career
1906–1912	Denmark	7	(0)
Medal record
Men's Football
Representing Denmark
Olympic Games
Silver medal – second place	1908 London	Team competition
Silver medal – second place	1912 Stockholm	Team competition
- * Club domestic league appearances and goals

Charles von Buchwald (22 October 1880 – 19 November 1951) was a Danish amateur football player, who played seven games as a defender for the Denmark national football team. He won silver medals at the 1908 and 1912 Summer Olympics. He also won a gold medal with the unofficial Danish team at the 1906 Intercalated Games. In his club career, Buchwald played for Danish teams ØB and AB.

== Biography ==
Buchwald's parents were August Detlev Friis (von) Buchwald (1830–1906), owner of the estate Friisholt, and Johanne Marie Charlotte von Arenstorff (1847–1901), and he belonged to an old a noble family from Holstein. He had a career as a lawyer.

He represented Denmark at the 1906 Summer Olympics in Athens, participating in the unofficial football tournament, which Denmark won. He took part in the very first official match of the Danish national team at the 1908 Olympics in London, as Denmark won 9–0 against France B. He played all three Danish games at the tournament and played a crucial role in helping the team win the silver medal. Four years later, in the football tournament of the 1912 Olympics in Stockholm, Buchwald once again played all three games. In the final game, against Great Britain, Buchwald was injured in the 30th minute of the game, with Denmark trailing Great Britain 1–2. As the rules did not allow substitutions, Denmark finished the game with one man less, losing 2–4.
