= Sigurd Andersen =

Norwegian footballer (1903-1962)

Personal information
- Date of birth: 2 January 1903
- Place of birth: Mjøndalen, Norway
- Date of death: 23 June 1962 (aged 59)
- Position: Forward

International career
| Years | Team | Apps | (Gls) |
| 1928 | Norway | 3 | (2) |

Sigurd Andersen (2 January 1903 – 23 June 1962) was a Norwegian footballer. He played in three matches for the Norway national football team in 1928.
