= Noel Watson =

English football manager, referee, and executive (1884–1980)

George Noel Watson (1884–1980) was a manager and later the secretary of Nottingham Forest.

Watson was also a referee who took charge of the 1925 FA Cup Final between Sheffield United and Cardiff City at Wembley. He also refereed international matches in the 1920s and 30s.

Watson was manager of Nottingham Forest between 1932 and 1936.

Preceded by W. E. Russell	FA Cup Final Referee; 1925	Succeeded by I. Baker
Preceded by Stan Hardy	Nottingham Forest Manager; 1932–1936	Succeeded by Harold Wightman

== See also ==
1925 FA Cup Final
