= Birger Steen =

Norwegian footballer (1907-1949)

Personal information
- Date of birth: 9 April 1907
- Date of death: 25 August 1949 (aged 42)

International career
Years	Team	Apps	(Gls)
1926–1924	Norway	7	(0)

Birger Steen (9 April 1907 – 25 August 1949) was a Norwegian footballer. He played in seven matches for the Norway national football team from 1926 to 1934.
