= Christian Grøthan =

Danish footballer (1890–1951)

Christian Vilhelm Balduin Grøthan (18 November 1890 – 6 April 1951) was a Danish football (soccer) player, who played 31 games and scored three goals for the Denmark national football team from 1915 to 1923. He also represented Denmark at the 1920 Summer Olympics football tournament. Born in Frederiksberg, Grøthan played as a defender for Copenhagen team B 93, with whom he won the 1916 Danish football championship.
