= Ludwig Wieder =

German footballer

Personal information
- Date of birth: 22 March 1900
- Date of death: 2 December 1977 (aged 77)
- Position: Forward

Senior career*
Years	Team	Apps	(Gls)
1922–1931	1. FC Nürnberg		

International career
1923–1926	Germany	6	(2)

Managerial career
- 1937–1939: Alemannia Aachen
- * Club domestic league appearances and goals

Ludwig Wieder (22 March 1900 – 2 December 1977) was a German international footballer.
