= Einar Larsen (Danish footballer) =

Danish footballer (1900-1981)

Personal information
- Date of birth: 7 June 1900
- Place of birth: Copenhagen, Denmark
- Date of death: 2 February 1981 (aged 80)
- Position: Forward

Senior career*
Years	Team	Apps	(Gls)
1919–1932	KFUMs Boldklub		

International career
1923–1929	Denmark	14	(3)
- * Club domestic league appearances and goals

Einar Larsen (7 June 1900 – 2 February 1981) was a Danish footballer who played as a forward. He made 14 appearances for the Denmark national team from 1923 to 1929.
