= Einar Wilhelms =

Norwegian footballer (1895-1978)

Personal information
- Date of birth: 2 August 1895
- Place of birth: Fredrikstad
- Date of death: 3 August 1978 (aged 83)
- Place of death: Fredrikstad

Senior career*
Years	Team	Apps	(Gls)
- Fredrikstad FK

International career
	Norway	13	(5)
- * Club domestic league appearances and goals

Einar Wilhelms (2 August 1895 – 3 August 1978) was a Norwegian football player. He was born in Fredrikstad, and played as an inside forward for Fredrikstad FK. He was capped 13 times for the Norwegian national team scoring five goals, and played at the Antwerp Olympics in 1920, where the Norwegian team reached the quarter-finals. He died in Fredrikstad in 1978.
