= Ernst Albihn =

Swedish association football referee

Ernst Teodor Albihn (11 March 1892 Norrköping, Sweden – 6 September 1944) was a Swedish merchant, football player and international football referee.

== Career ==
A travelling salesman by profession, Albihn played for IFK Norrköping from 1909, and was part of the team that played in the inaugural year of Svenska Serien, precursor to Allsvenskan. He became a football referee in 1913, and in the period 1913–1919 he was one of the most sought after referees for national games.

He also officiated 13 international matches in 1916–1923, and was one of the referees for the newly formed Allsvenskan league in 1925.

Later in life he moved to Stockholm, where he worked as a merchant representing Norrköpings tapetfabrik.
