= Victor Klein (Danish footballer) =

Danish Footballer

Personal information
- Date of birth: 25 June 1889
- Date of death: 27 October 1969 (aged 80)

International career
Years	Team	Apps	(Gls)
1915–1917	Denmark	5	(3)

Victor Klein (25 June 1889 – 27 October 1969) was a Danish footballer. He played in five matches for the Denmark national football team from 1915 to 1917.
