= Algot Haglund =

Swedish footballer and bandy player

Personal information
- Full name: Georg Algot Haglund
- Date of birth: 19 September 1905
- Date of death: 17 October 1963 (aged 58)

Senior career*
Years	Team	Apps	(Gls)
1921–1928	Djurgården		
1928–1934	AIK		
1934	Johannespojkarna		

International career
1924–1927	Sweden	7	(4)
- * Club domestic league appearances and goals

Georg Algot Haglund (19 September 1905 – 17 October 1963) was a Swedish international footballer, international bandy player and ice hockey player.

Algot Haglund was the brother of Djurgården ice hockey goaltender Curt Haglund.

== Career ==
As a footballer, Algot Haglund represented Djurgården, AIK and Johannespojkarna. For Djurgården, he played 20 Allsvenskan games and scored 2 goals. He made 7 appearances and scored 4 goals for Sweden men's national football team. Haglund made his international debut in a friendly against Estonia where he also scored one goal.

As an ice hockey player Haglund represented Djurgården.

As a bandy player, Haglund represented Djurgården and AIK and was awarded Stora Grabbars och Tjejers Märke. He made six appearances for the national bandy team.

== Honours ==
=== Club ===
AIK

- Swedish Champion: 1931
