= Otto Aulie =

Norwegian footballer (1894-1923)

Personal information
- Date of birth: 27 September 1894
- Date of death: 9 February 1923 (aged 28)

Senior career*
Years	Team	Apps	(Gls)
- Odd
- Lyn

International career
	Norway	28	(0)
- * Club domestic league appearances and goals

Otto Wilhelm Aulie (27 September 1894 – 9 February 1923) was a Norwegian football defender.

Aulie was born in Tønsberg. He was a right-back for Odd and Lyn, and was a Norwegian Football Cup winner with Odd in 1913 and 1915.

Aulie won a total of 28 caps for Norway, and played in all three of Norway's game at the Antwerp Olympics in 1920. He died of meningitis in Skien in 1923, aged just 28.
