= Johnny Helgesen =

Norwegian footballer (1897-1964)

Personal information
- Date of birth: 1 January 1897
- Date of death: 26 December 1964 (aged 67)

Senior career*
Years	Team	Apps	(Gls)
- FK Kvik

International career
1917–1928	Norway	22	(7)
- * Club domestic league appearances and goals

Johnny Helgesen (1 January 1897 – 26 December 1964) was a Norwegian football player for the club FK Kvik. He was born in Halden. He was capped 22 times for Norwegian national team scoring seven goals, and played at the Antwerp Olympics in 1920, where the Norwegian team reached the quarter-finals. He died in Halden in 1964.
