= Adolph Wold =

Norwegian footballer (1892-1976)

Adolph Wold (30 September 1892 – 5 February 1976) was a Norwegian football player. He was born in Kristiania, and played as a wing half for Ready. He was capped 26 times for Norwegian national team scoring three goals, and played at the Antwerp Olympics in 1920, where the Norwegian team reached the quarter-finals. He died in Oslo in 1976.
