= Karl Bergström =

Swedish boxer

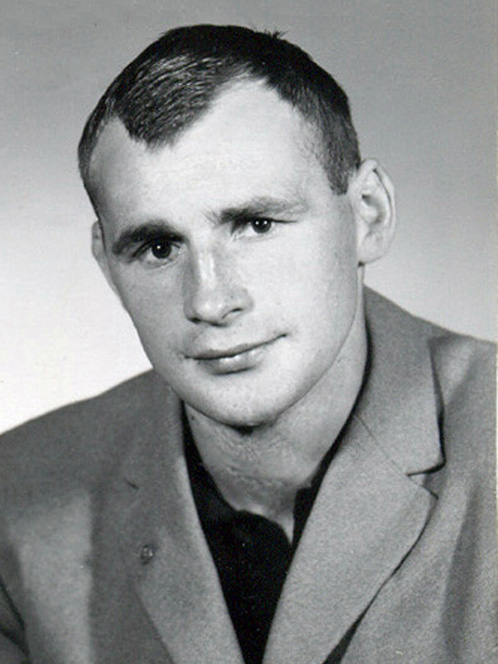

Personal information
- Born: 10 March 1937 Själevad, Sweden
- Died: 10 May 2018 (aged 81)
- Height: 174 cm (5 ft 9 in)

Sport
- Sport: Boxing
- Club: Djurgårdens IF

Karl Ivan Bergström (10 March 1937 – 10 May 2018) was a Swedish welterweight boxer. He competed at the 1960 Summer Olympics, but was eliminated in his first bout of the tournament (the Round of 32), losing a 0–5 decision to Joseph Lartey of Ghana.

Bergström represented Djurgårdens IF.

== 1960 Olympic results ==
Below is the record of Karl Bergström, a Swedish welterweight boxer who competed at the 1960 Rome Olympics:

- Round of 64: bye
- Round of 32: lost to Joseph Lartey (Ghana) by decision, 0–5
