= Bertel Ulrichsen =

Norwegian footballer (1901-1977)

Personal information
- Date of birth: 15 April 1901
- Place of birth: Skien, Norway
- Date of death: 25 February 1977 (aged 75)

International career
Years	Team	Apps	(Gls)
1923	Norway	1	(1)

Bertel Ulrichsen (15 April 1901 – 25 February 1977) was a Norwegian footballer. He played in one match for the Norway national football team in 1923.
