= Arne Andersen (footballer) =

Olympic footballer (1900-1986)

- Born: 21 April 1900; Halden, Norway
- Died: 26 October 1986 (aged 86); Halden
- Occupations: Police officer Footballer

Arne Johan Andersen (21 April 1900 – 26 October 1986) was a Norwegian football player for the club FK Kvik, and police officer. He was born in Halden. He played with the Norwegian national team at the Antwerp Olympics in 1920, where the Norwegian team reached the quarter-finals. He was capped six times for Norway, scoring four goals. During occupation of Norway by Nazi Germany, he was arrested on 15 September 1944, and incarcerated at the Grini concentration camp from October 1944. He died in Halden in 1986.
