= Kaare Engebretsen =

Norwegian footballer (1893-1960)

Personal information
- Date of birth: 22 August 1893
- Place of birth: Oslo, Norway
- Date of death: 16 October 1960 (aged 67)
- Place of death: Oslo, Norway

International career
Years	Team	Apps	(Gls)
- Norway

Kaare Engebretsen (22 August 1893 – 16 October 1960) was a Norwegian footballer. He played in eleven matches for the Norway national football team between 1913 and 1917.
