= Kongsvinger IL =

Sports club in Kongsvinger, Norway

- Full name: Kongsvinger Idrettslag
- Sport: association football, track and field athletics, handball, ice hockey, orienteering, skiing, skating
- Founded: 31 January 1892
- Based in: Kongsvinger, Norway
- Arena: Kongshallen (ice), Kongsvingerhallen, Tråstadhallene (handball)
- Stadium: Gjemselund Stadion (soccer), Holt Stadion (outdoor skating), Skansesletta friidrettsbane (track and field)
- Website: kongsvingeril.no

Kongsvinger Idrettslag is a Norwegian sports club from the city of Kongsvinger which is located in Kongsvinger Municipality in Innlandet county. It was founded in 1892. Its men's football team is well-known, and it has teams for several other sports.

== Athletics ==
Kongsvinger IL has an athletics section. Until 2009, it too used Gjemselund Stadion, which got rubber track in 1986. In 2009, Gjemselund Stadion was converted to a football-only stadium, forcing the athletics section to use other stadiums in the region. As of 2020, Skansesletta friidrettsbane is being used.

Grete Kirkeberg is a well-known athlete from Kongsvinger IL.

== Football ==
Kongsvinger IL has several football teams, ranging from professional to children's teams. The professional men's team plays in the Norwegian First Division, and the women play in the Second Division (third highest).

== Ice hockey ==
Kongsvinger Knights, founded in 1961, is Kongsvinger's ice hockey team. It soon became part of Kongsvinger Idrettslag.

== Others ==
There are also clubs for handball, skiing, ice skating and gymnastics.
