= Alf Olsen (footballer) =

Danish footballer (1893–1976)

Alf Aage Olsen (3 September 1893 – 18 August 1976) was a Danish amateur football player, who played 19 games and scored eight goal for the Denmark national football team from 1912 to 1926. He represented Denmark at the 1920 Summer Olympics football tournament. Born in Frederiksberg, Olsen played as a forward for Copenhagen teams B 93, KB, and Fremad Amager.
