= Sven Rydell =

Swedish footballer (1905–1975)

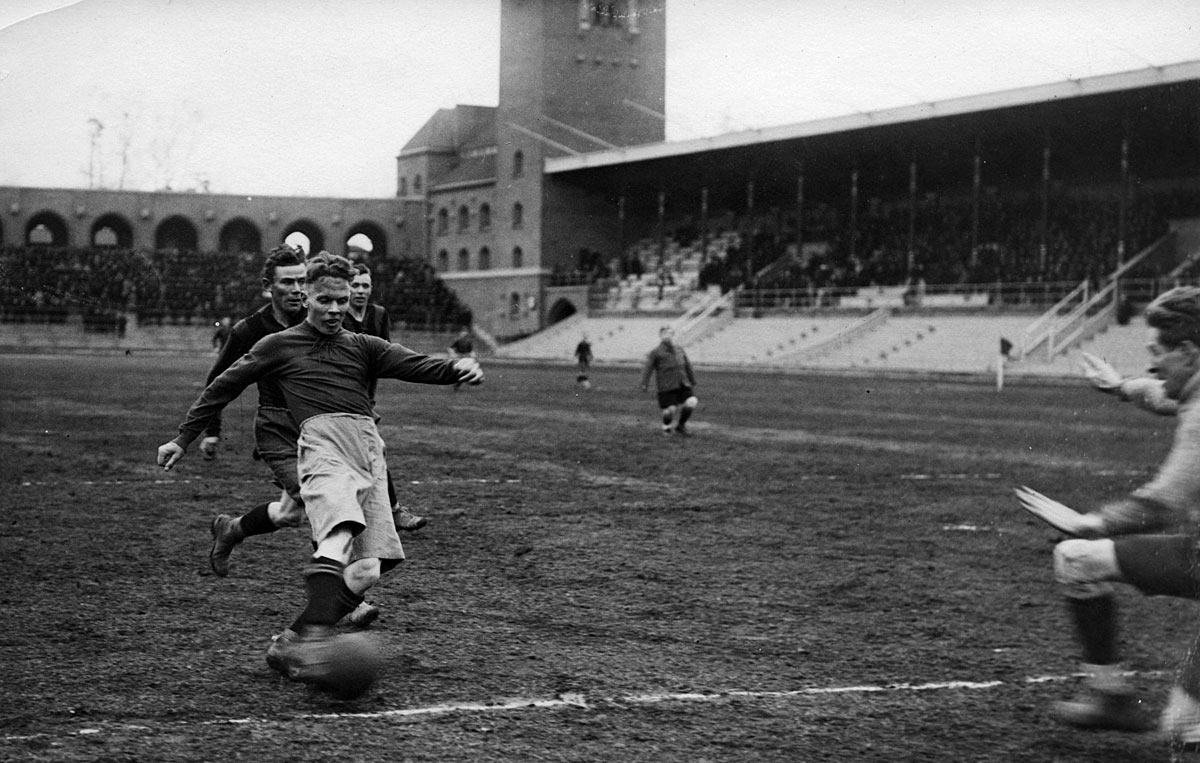
- Rydell in 1923

Personal information
- Full name: Sven Åke Albert Rydell
- Date of birth: 14 January 1905
- Place of birth: Gothenburg, Sweden
- Date of death: 4 April 1975 (aged 70)
- Place of death: Gothenburg, Sweden
- Position: Striker

Senior career*
Years	Team	Apps	(Gls)
1920–1924	Holmens IS	37	(38)
1924–1930	Örgryte IS	179	(122)
1930–1931	Redbergslids IK	20	(10)
1931–1934	Örgryte IS	24	(20)
Total		260	(190)

International career
1929	Sweden B	1	(1)
1923–1932	Sweden	43	(49)

Managerial career
- 1934–1935: Örgryte IS
Medal record
Representing Sweden
Olympic Games
Bronze medal – third place	1924 Paris	Team
- * Club domestic league appearances and goals

Sven Åke Albert Rydell (14 January 1905 – 4 April 1975) was a Swedish footballer who played as a forward. He represented Holmens IS, Örgryte IS, and Redbergslids IK during a club career that spanned between 1920 and 1934. A full international between 1923 and 1932, he won 43 caps and scored 49 goals for the Sweden national team. He scored five goals at the 1924 Summer Olympics where Sweden finished third. He was the all-time leading scorer for the Sweden national team for more than 80 years before his record was overtaken by Zlatan Ibrahimović in September 2014.

== Club career ==
At club level, Rydell played for Örgryte IS, Redbergslids IK, and Holmens IS. Rydell had scored a record of nine hat-tricks for Sweden.

== International career ==
Rydell played in the 1920s and 30s, and scored 49 goals in only 43 matches for the Sweden national team. His 49 goals stood as the national record for over 80 years. Because his career spanned the nascent years of international football, he never got a chance to play in the World Cup; his only appearance at the world stage came in the 1924 Summer Olympics, at which Sweden won a bronze medal. He was the all-time leading scorer for the Sweden national team until 4 September 2014, when Zlatan Ibrahimović overtook him by scoring his 50th international goal. However, he holds the record of scoring nine hat-tricks for Sweden.

Rydell was awarded the Svenska Dagbladet Gold Medal in 1931 after an impressive performance in an international game against Denmark in 1931.

== Personal life ==
Rydell's daughter Eva represented Sweden as a gymnast in the 1960 and 1964 Olympics. Rydell died on 4 April 1975. He is buried at Östra kyrkogården in Gothenburg.

== Career statistics ==
Appearances and goals by national team and year
National team	Year	Apps	Goals
Sweden	1923	2	2
Sweden	1924	9	18
Sweden	1925	4	7
Sweden	1926	4	2
Sweden	1927	7	8
Sweden	1928	3	1
Sweden	1929	4	4
Sweden	1930	1	0
Sweden	1931	5	4
Sweden	1932	4	3
Total		43	49

Scores and results list Sweden's goal tally first, score column indicates score after each Rydell goal.

List of international goals scored by Sven Rydell
No.	Date	Venue	Opponent	Score	Result	Competition	Ref.
1	20 June 1923	Strömvallen, Gävle, Sweden	Finland	1–0	5–4	Friendly	
2	16 September 1923	Gressbanen, Oslo, Norway	Norway	3–2	3–2	Friendly	
3	18 May 1924	Stockholm Olympic Stadium, Stockholm, Sweden	Poland	1–0	5–1	Friendly	
4	18 May 1924	Stockholm Olympic Stadium, Stockholm, Sweden	Poland	3–1	5–1	Friendly	
5	18 May 1924	Stockholm Olympic Stadium, Stockholm, Sweden	Poland	5–1	5–1	Friendly	
6	29 May 1924	Stade de Colombes, Paris, France	Belgium	2–0	8–1	1924 Summer Olympics	
7	29 May 1924	Stade de Colombes, Paris, France	Belgium	6–0	8–1	1924 Summer Olympics	
8	29 May 1924	Stade de Colombes, Paris, France	Belgium	8–1	8–1	1924 Summer Olympics	
9	1 June 1924	Stade Pershing, Paris, France	Egypt	4–0	5–0	1924 Summer Olympics	
10	9 June 1924	Stade de Colombes, Paris, France	Netherlands	1–0	3–1	1924 Summer Olympics	
11	9 June 1924	Stade de Colombes, Paris, France	Netherlands	3–1	3–1	1924 Summer Olympics	
12	15 June 1924	Parken, Copenhagen, Denmark	Denmark	2–2	3–2	1924–28 Nordic Football Championship	
13	15 June 1924	Parken, Copenhagen, Denmark	Denmark	3–2	3–2	1924–28 Nordic Football Championship	
14	29 June 1924	Stockholm Olympic Stadium, Stockholm, Sweden	Egypt	2–0	5–0	Friendly	
15	29 June 1924	Stockholm Olympic Stadium, Stockholm, Sweden	Egypt	3–0	5–0	Friendly	
16	29 June 1924	Stockholm Olympic Stadium, Stockholm, Sweden	Egypt	4–0	5–0	Friendly	
17	29 June 1924	Stockholm Olympic Stadium, Stockholm, Sweden	Egypt	5–0	5–0	Friendly	
18	21 September 1924	Råsunda Stadium, Solna, Sweden	Norway	4–1	6–1	1924–28 Nordic Football Championship	
19	21 September 1924	Råsunda Stadium, Solna, Sweden	Norway	5–1	6–1	1924–28 Nordic Football Championship	
20	21 September 1924	Råsunda Stadium, Solna, Sweden	Norway	6–1	6–1	1924–28 Nordic Football Championship	
21	5 July 1925	Stockholm Olympic Stadium, Stockholm, Sweden	Austria	1–4	2–4	Friendly	
22	12 July 1925	Stockholm Olympic Stadium, Stockholm, Sweden	Hungary	2–0	6–2	Friendly	
23	12 July 1925	Stockholm Olympic Stadium, Stockholm, Sweden	Hungary	5–2	6–2	Friendly	
24	23 August 1925	Gräsbanen, Oslo, Norway	Norway	1–1	7–3	1924–28 Nordic Football Championship	
25	23 August 1925	Gräsbanen, Oslo, Norway	Norway	3–2	7–3	1924–28 Nordic Football Championship	
26	23 August 1925	Gräsbanen, Oslo, Norway	Norway	4–2	7–3	1924–28 Nordic Football Championship	
27	23 August 1925	Gräsbanen, Oslo, Norway	Norway	5–2	7–3	1924–28 Nordic Football Championship	
28	9 June 1926	Stockholm Olympic Stadium, Stockholm, Sweden	Norway	2–2	3–2	1924–28 Nordic Football Championship	
29	9 June 1926	Stockholm Olympic Stadium, Stockholm, Sweden	Norway	3–2	3–2	1924–28 Nordic Football Championship	
30	3 April 1927	Duden Park, Brussels, Belgium	Belgium	1–1	1–2	Friendly	
31	29 May 1927	Stockholm Olympic Stadium, Stockholm, Sweden	Latvia	2–0	12–0	Friendly	
32	29 May 1927	Stockholm Olympic Stadium, Stockholm, Sweden	Latvia	8–0	12–0	Friendly	
33	29 May 1927	Stockholm Olympic Stadium, Stockholm, Sweden	Latvia	12–0	12–0	Friendly	
34	26 June 1927	Gressbanen, Oslo, Norway	Norway	1–1	5–3	1924–28 Nordic Football Championship	
35	26 June 1927	Gressbanen, Oslo, Norway	Norway	2–1	5–3	1924–28 Nordic Football Championship	
36	26 June 1927	Gressbanen, Oslo, Norway	Norway	4–1	5–3	1924–28 Nordic Football Championship	
37	6 November 1927	Letzigrund, Zürich, Switzerland	Switzerland	1–1	2–2	Friendly	
38	7 October 1928	Parken, Copenhagen, Denmark	Denmark	1–3	1–3	1924–28 Nordic Football Championship	
39	9 June 1929	Stockholm Olympic Stadium, Stockholm, Sweden	Netherlands	2–0	6–2	Friendly	
40	9 June 1929	Stockholm Olympic Stadium, Stockholm, Sweden	Netherlands	3–0	6–2	Friendly	
41	9 June 1929	Stockholm Olympic Stadium, Stockholm, Sweden	Netherlands	5–1	6–2	Friendly	
42	28 July 1929	Malmö IP, Malmö, Sweden	Latvia	2–0	10–0	Friendly	
43	28 June 1931	Stockholm Olympic Stadium, Stockholm, Sweden	Denmark	2–1	3–1	1929–32 Nordic Football Championship	
44	28 June 1931	Stockholm Olympic Stadium, Stockholm, Sweden	Denmark	3–1	3–1	1929–32 Nordic Football Championship	
45	26 July 1931	Arosvallen, Västerås, Sweden	Latvia	4–0	6–0	Friendly	
46	8 November 1931	Üllöi utca, Budapest, Hungary	Hungary	1–1	1–3	Friendly	
47	16 May 1932	Stockholm Olympic Stadium, Stockholm, Sweden	Finland	1–1	7–1	Friendly	
48	16 May 1932	Stockholm Olympic Stadium, Stockholm, Sweden	Finland	2–1	7–1	Friendly	
49	16 May 1932	Stockholm Olympic Stadium, Stockholm, Sweden	Finland	6–1	7–1	Friendly	

== Honours ==
Sweden

- Summer Olympics bronze medal: 1924

Individual

- Nordic Football Championship top scorer: 1924–1928
- Swedish Football Hall of Fame inductee: 2003

Records

- Most hat-tricks for the Sweden national team: nine

== See also ==
- List of footballers who achieved hat-trick records

Preceded by Johan Richthoff	Svenska Dagbladet Gold Medal; 1931	Succeeded by Ivar Johansson
