= Rolf Aas =

Norwegian footballer (1891-1946)

Personal information
- Date of birth: 12 October 1891
- Date of death: 9 April 1946 (aged 54)

Senior career*
Years	Team	Apps	(Gls)
- Mercantile
- Lyn

International career
	Norway	19	(2)
- * Club domestic league appearances and goals

Rolf Aas (12 October 1891 – 9 April 1946) was a Norwegian football player. He was born in Kristiania. He played as a winger for Mercantile and Lyn. He was capped 19 times for Norwegian national team scoring two goals, and played at the Antwerp Olympics in 1920, where the Norwegian team reached the quarter finals. He died in Oslo in 1946.
