= Per Kaufeldt =

Swedish footballer

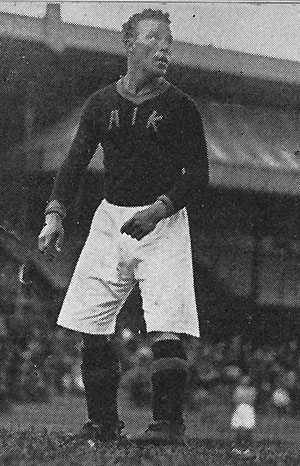

Personal information
- Full name: Per Ludvig Gösta Kaufeldt
- Date of birth: 1 August 1902
- Place of birth: Stockholm, Sweden
- Date of death: 21 March 1956 (aged 53)
- Place of death: Stockholm, Sweden
- Position: Striker

Youth career
- Hagalunds IS
- Tranebergs IF
- Westermalms IF

Senior career*
Years	Team	Apps	(Gls)
–1918	Råsunda IS		
1918–1924	AIK		
1924–1925	SO Montpellier		
1925–1934	AIK	170	(122)

International career
1921–1931	Sweden	33	(23)

Managerial career
- 1934–1940: AIK
- 1940–1944: Hammarby IF
- 1944–1950: Djurgårdens IF
- 1950–1951: Örebro SK
- 1951–1956: AIK
Medal record
Representing Sweden
Olympic Games
Bronze medal – third place	1924 Paris	Team
- * Club domestic league appearances and goals

Per Ludvig Gösta Kaufeldt (1 August 1902 – 21 March 1956) was a Swedish football and bandy player. He won a bronze medal at the 1924 Summer Olympics.

Kaufeldt is the all-time top scorer of AIK, with 122 goals in 170 matches; he won the national football title with the club in 1923 and 1932 and a bandy title in 1931. Internationally, between 1921 and 1931 he played football (33 matches, 23 goals), ice hockey (6 matches, 0 goals) and bandy (2 matches). In retirement he worked as a coach with AIK, Hammarby, Djurgården and Örebro SK. Later he developed an unexplained pain in his legs, which led to his death at the age 53.
