= Finn Berstad =

Norwegian footballer (1901-1982)

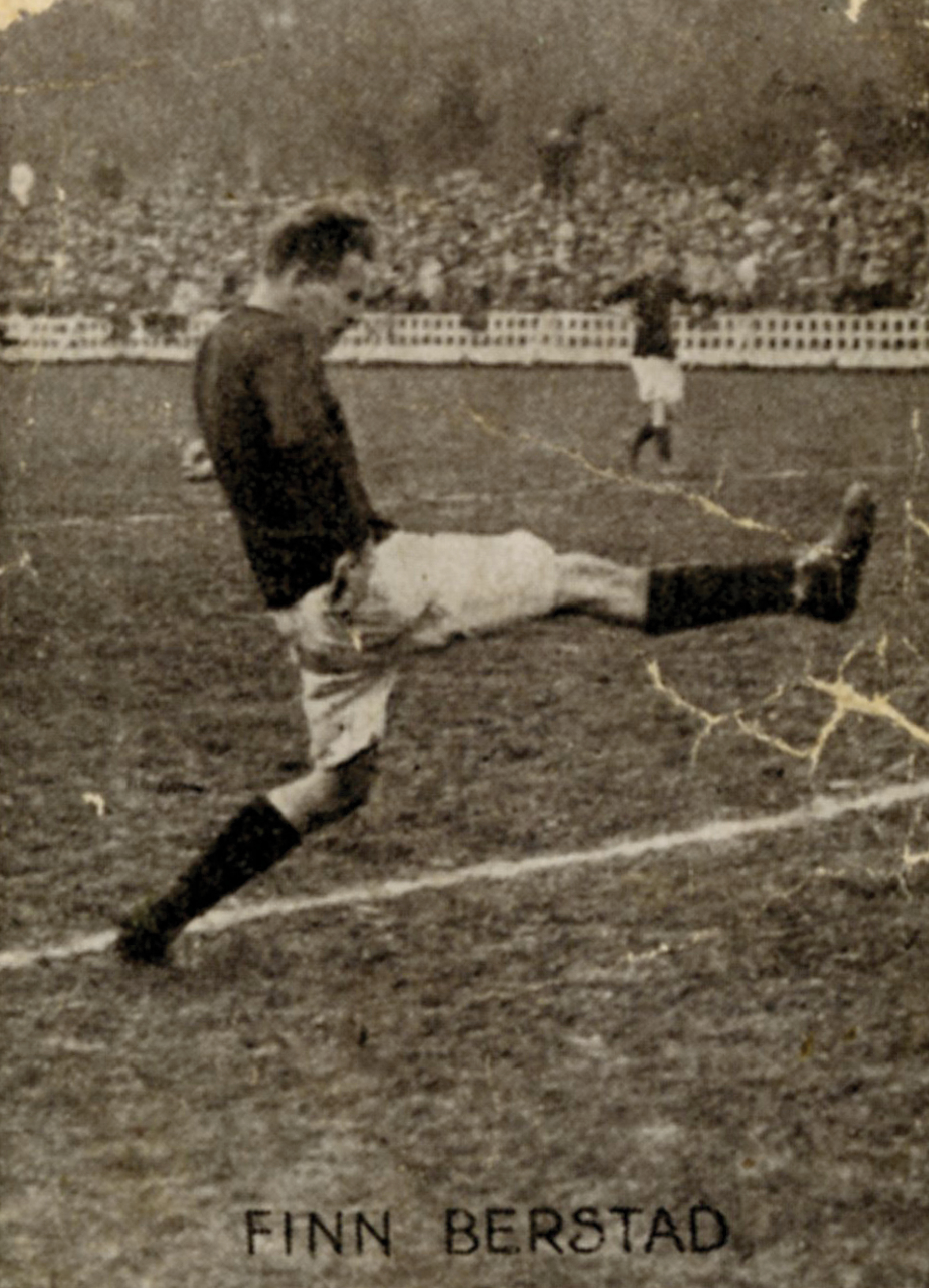

Personal information
- Full name: Finn Berstad
- Date of birth: 17 July 1901
- Place of birth: Bergen, Norway
- Date of death: 1 October 1982 (aged 81)
- Place of death: Bergen, Norway
- Positions: Striker; central defender

Senior career*
Years	Team	Apps	(Gls)
- SK Brann

International career^{‡}
1921–1933	Norway	32	(13)
- * Club domestic league appearances and goals as of 31 December 2007 ‡ National team caps and goals as of 31 December 2007

Finn Berstad (17 July 1901 — 1 October 1982) was a Norwegian footballer.

== Club career ==
Berstad was a striker in his early career, but was later used as a central defender. Some remember Berstad for his penalty kick against Swedish team Djurgården in the summer of 1920 on Brann stadion, when he missed on a blank goal on purpose. He played for SK Brann, and won the Norwegian cup title in 1923 and 1925.

== International career ==
In addition he played 32 matches and scored 13 goals for the Norway national football team.
