= Einar Gundersen =

Norwegian footballer (1896–1962)

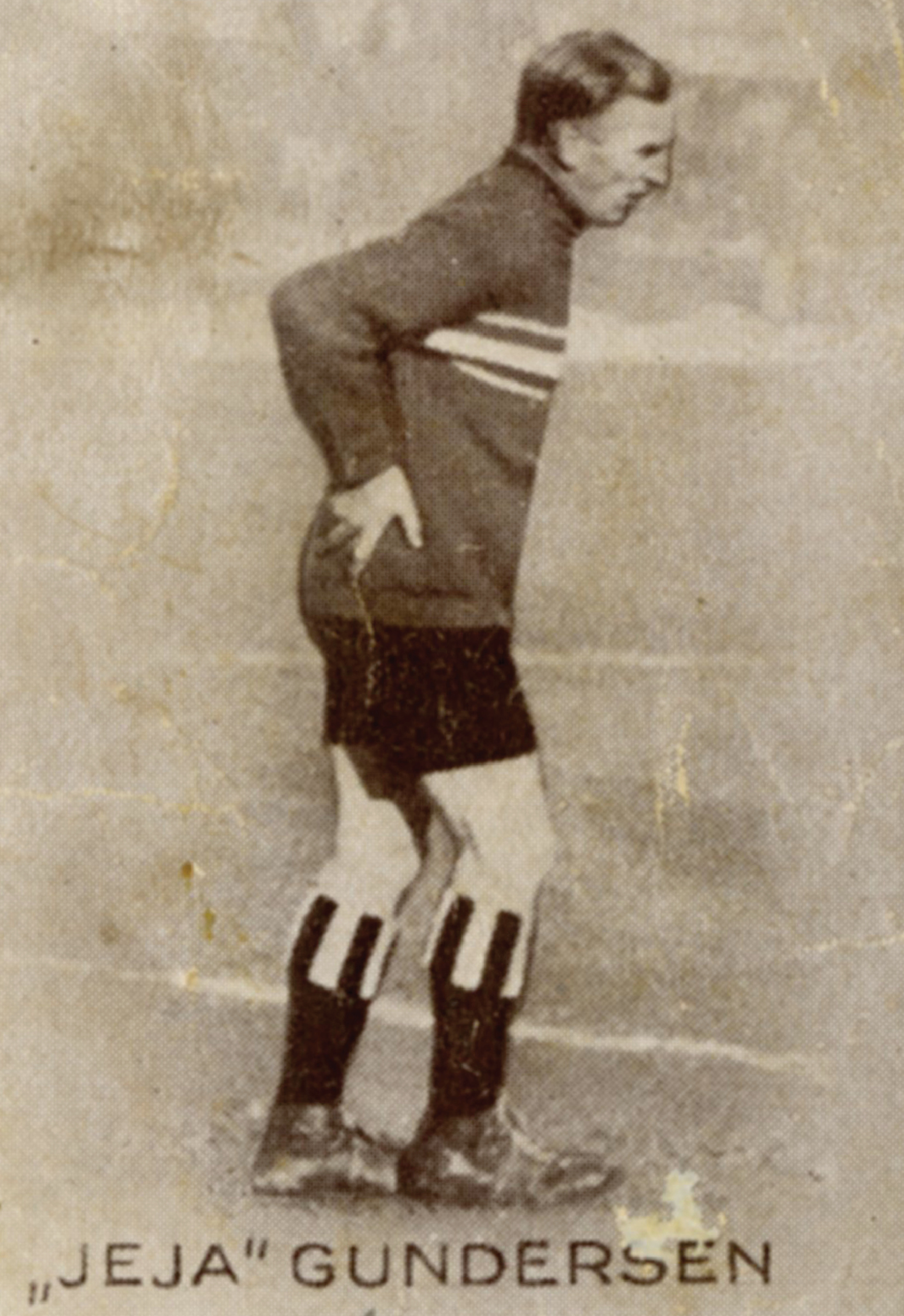
- Gundersen ca. 1930

Personal information
- Date of birth: 20 September 1896
- Place of birth: Skien, United Kingdoms of Sweden and Norway
- Date of death: 29 October 1962 (aged 66)
- Place of death: Tønsberg, Norway
- Position: Centre-forward

Senior career*
Years	Team	Apps	(Gls)
1914–1915	Odd	18+	(19+)
1916	SK Snøgg		
1917–1921	Odd		(86+)
1921–1922	Sète 34		
1922–1927	Odd		
1928–1932	Tønsbergs TF		
Total		157+	(179+)

International career
1917–1928	Norway	33	(26)
- * Club domestic league appearances and goals

Einar "Jeja" Gundersen (20 September 1896 – 29 October 1962) was a Norwegian footballer who played play as a centre-forward for Odd. He is regarded as one of Norwegian football's first star players. He played 33 times for Norway, and his 26 international goals place him third on the national team's all-time scoring list.

His nickname Jeja means literally "Me Then", as that was what he wondered as a kid when he was not picked for the team.

At club level, Gundersen scored more than 200 goals. He won the Norwegian Cup five times. He was also a member of the Norwegian team that played in the 1920 Olympics, and scored twice in the 3–1 win against England's amateur side.

In September 2024, Norway's anti-doping agency mistakenly included Gundersen and Jørgen Juve on a list of football players to be tested. The agency's communications director said, "All we can do now is admit we're wrong. We can joke about it in the office today and then review our routines going forward."
