= Gressbanen =

Sports ground in Oslo, Norway

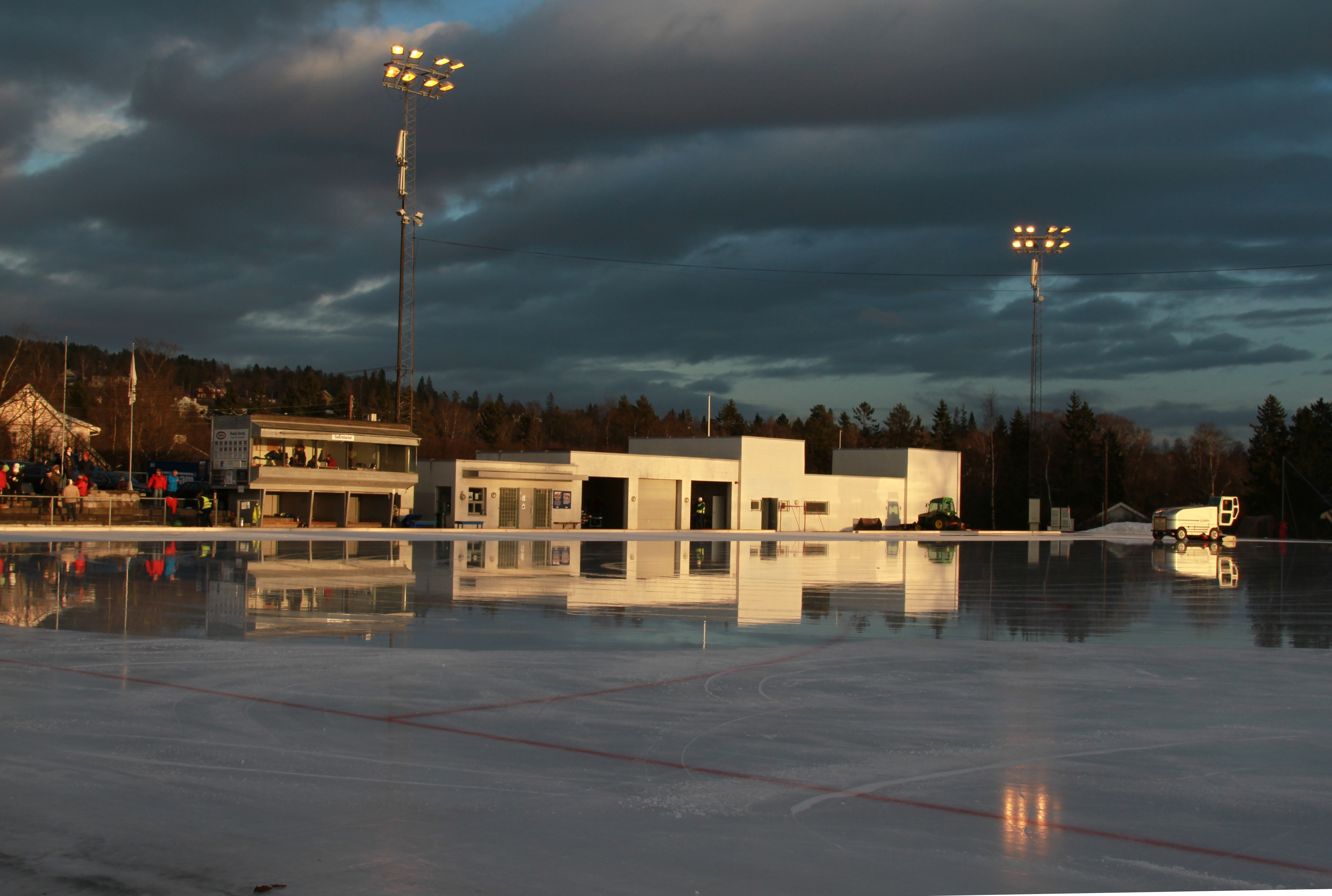
- Interactive map of Gressbanen
- Location: Holmen, Oslo
- Coordinates: 59°57′03″N 10°40′34″E
- Owner: Oslo Municipality
- Surface: Artificial turf (summer); Artificial ice (winter)
- Record attendance: 20,000
- Field size: 105 m × 65 m (115 yd × 71 yd)

Construction
- Opened: 1 September 1918

Tenants
- IF Ready (1918–); Mercantile SFK (1918–47); Norway national football team (1919–27); Norwegian Football Cup Final (1920–21)

Gressbanen or Vestre Holmen is a stadium located at Holmen in Oslo, Norway. During summer it has artificial turf and is used for association football, while during winter it has artificial ice and fields bandy. The complex also contains a smaller training field with gravel during summer and natural ice during winter. Gressbanen is the home venue of IF Ready, whose bandy team plays in the Norwegian Bandy Premier League and who fields 35 recreational football teams.

The stadium was built as a response to the need for a grass pitch for the Norway national football team, as well as to serve as a home to Ready and Mercantile SFK. It opened on 1 September 1918 as the second grass pitch in Norway and the first in Oslo. As such it replaced Frogner Stadion as the home of the national team, for which it was home to seventeen matches. The national team moved to Ullevaal Stadion in 1927. Gressbanen also featured two Norwegian Football Cup Final, in 1920 and 1921. The pitch has been iced and used for bandy since 1935. Mercantile remained a tenant until 1947, when it merged with SFK Trygg. Gressbanen received artificial turf in 2001 and artificial ice in 2004.

== History ==
During the 1910s there were no grass football pitches in Norway. At the time the only proper football fields in Oslo were Bislett Stadion and Frogner Stadion, the latter which was at first used by the national team. The Football Association of Norway took initiative in 1911 to study the possibility for a grass field and conducted visits to Idrætsparken in Copenhagen and Stockholm Olympic Stadium to investigate how the neighboring capitals had resolved the issue. The main concern was that a grass field located in the Norwegian climate would not survive the winter. Also financing was a challenge, as none of the local clubs, nor the federation, had capital to construct a grass venue. In 1914 the Norway national team had lost 7–0 against Sweden on the grass pitch at Råsunda Stadium, with the press stating that "grass has become our ruin", pointing out how the Norwegian players were unable to handle the wet surface.

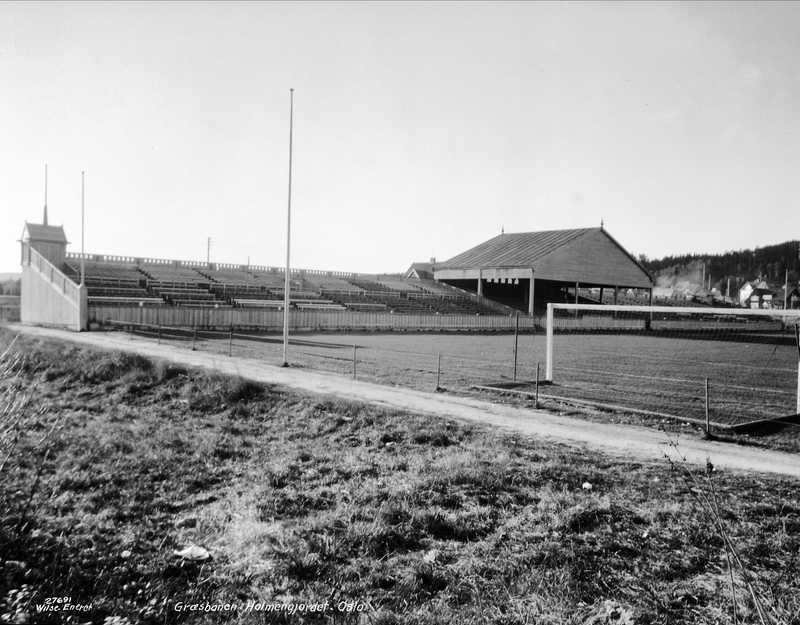
Gressbanen's grandstand in 1925

The initiative to build a grass field at Holmen came from M. W. Aas, who had visited Vienna in 1915 and had observed the possibilities created there. He gained the support from Mercantile SFK and later also Ready. To construct the venue the limited company A/S Græsbanen was incorporated on 3 April 1916 with a share capital of 42,000 Norwegian krone (NOK). Ready and Mercantile appointed an equal number of board members in the company.

Stavanger Stadion opened with Norway's first grass pitch in 1917. The success of the 1917 Cup Final demonstrated the qualities of a grass field and resulted in NFF establishing a fund which could lend money to clubs intending to build a grass pitch. Gressbanen was the first venue to be lent money through the arrangement, receiving funding for the stands. As the first grass field in the capital, Gressbanen was also selected as the home venue of the national team.

Construction was supported financially by among others NFF president Daniel Eie and director Johan Throne Holst. The lot, at the time in Aker, was owned by shipowner Olaf Ditlev-Simonsen and donated the land to the company. He also paid for a road, water and sewer line to the venue. The official opening of Gressbanen took place on 1 September 1918, in front of an audience of 10,000. The opening match was between a combined Kristiania team and AIK from Stockholm. The venue was inaugurated as a national stadium the following year. NFF remained a tenant at Gressbanen until 1926, when it moved its games to the newly constructed Ullevaal Stadion, which also served as the home of Lyn. Gressbanen was iced for the first time in 1932.

The combination of natural grass and natural ice gave poor conditions for both bandy and football players. Lack of refrigeration caused the ice to only lay during the coldest part of the winter. The ice took its toll on the grass, causing it to not have grown properly until midway through the summer season. Increased population further raised the number of recreational teams which played on the field, causing further wear as 35 teams were scheduled to play on the two fields. Ready therefore took initiative to upgrade the venue as a combined artificial turf and artificial ice stadium, similar to the solution chosen at Skien Isstadion.

Oslo Municipality granted NOK 7.7 million for the first part of construction in March 2000, which in addition to other funding secured the necessary NOK 13.4 million for the first stage. This consisted of the laying of refrigeration tubes under the soil and the artificial turf. The construction of pumps and cooling central was delayed till the second stage. The first stage opened on 18 August 2001. The artificial ice facilities were completed in 2004. Thus Gressbanen was the third bandy field in Oslo to receive artificial ice and the eleventh overall in Norway.

== Facilities ==
Gressbanen consists of two playing fields and is located in the Holmen neighborhood of Vestre Aker in Oslo. The venues are owned by Oslo Municipality and operated by Ready. The larger venue features artificial turf during summer and artificial ice during winter, while the smaller venue has gravel during summer and natural ice during winter. The main surface measures 105 by 65 meters (344 by 213 ft), while the smaller field measures 89 by 49 meters (292 by 161 ft). Both are illuminated at 100 lux. The main field is one of nineteen artificial bandy rinks in Norway. Football is played from early March through the end of October, while the field is iced for bandy from 1 November to early March.

== Events ==
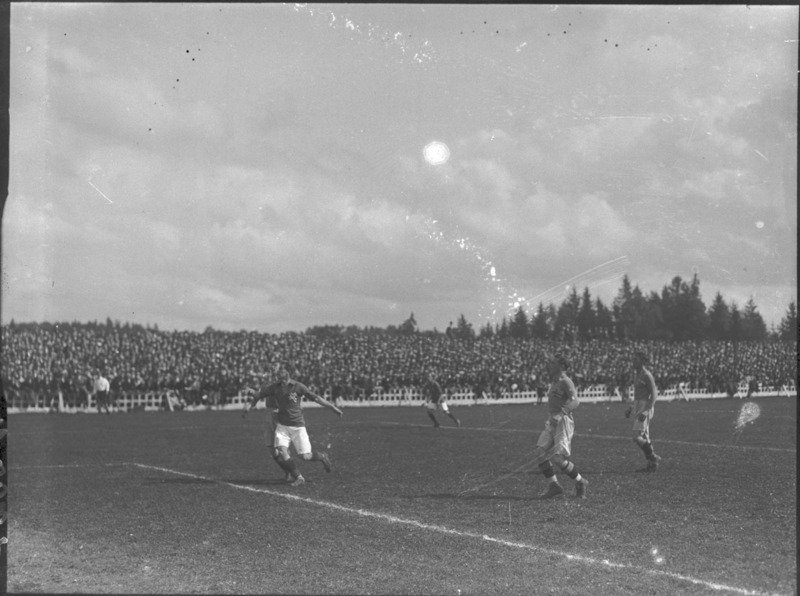
An international football match in 1925

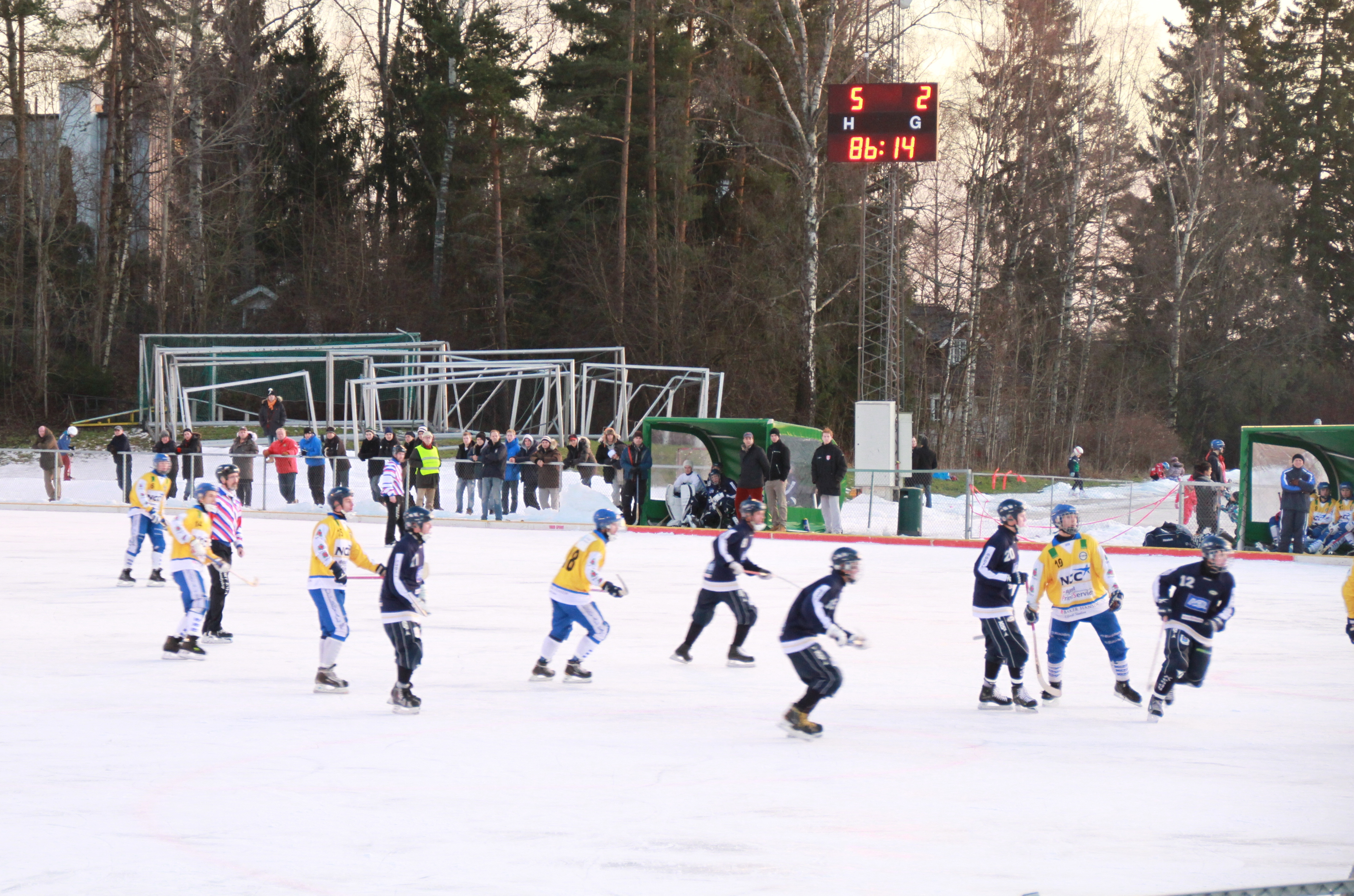
Ready playing a Norwegian Bandy Premier League match against Ullevål IL in 2011

Two cup finals have been held at Gressbanen. The 1920 edition saw Ørn-Horten beat Frigg 1–0 in front of 14,000 spectators. The following year Frigg took revenge by beating Odd 2–0 in front of 20,000 spectators.

The venue was the home of the Norway national football team from 1919 to 1926, with an additional match played in 1927. The stadium's record attendance of 20,000 took place at the 14 September 1924 match against Denmark.

International matches
Date	Opponent	Score	Attendance	Ref
29 June 1919	Sweden	4–3	14,000	
31 August 1919	Netherlands	1–1	14,000	
21 September 1919	Denmark	3–2	12,000	
13 June 1920	Denmark	1–1	14,000	
27 June 1920	Sweden	0–3	14,000	
25 May 1921	Finland	3–2	14,000	
19 June 1921	Sweden	3–1	14,000	
24 September 1922	Sweden	0–5	15,000	
17 June 1923	Finland	3–0	12,000	
13 June 1923	Switzerland	2–2	10,000	
16 September 1923	Sweden	2–3	14,000	
15 June 1924	Germany	0–2	6,000	
14 September 1924	Denmark	1–3	20,000	
7 June 1925	Finland	1–0	12,000	
23 August 1925	Sweden	3–7	15,000	
19 September 1926	Denmark	1–1	20,000	
26 June 1927	Sweden	3–5	10,000	

== Bibliography ==
- Andersen, Espen (2007). Det store gjennombruddet (in Norwegian). Oslo: Norwegian School of Sport Sciences. ISBN 9788250204102.
- Larsen, Petter (1977). 75 norske fotballår (in Norwegian). Oslo: Football Association of Norway.
- Stang, Lauritz; Greve, Thorvald (1957). Ready 1907–1957. Oslo.
