= Football at the 1912 Summer Olympics – Matches =

Football at the 1912 Summer Olympics was the association football tournament that featured eleven teams, all from Europe. Four teams were drawn into eight groups of two where they each played once in a single-elimination format: the rest of the teams directly passed to the quarter-finals. Belgium withdrew shortly before the draw, while France withdrew after the draw.

Great Britain won the competition. Denmark won silver and the Netherlands won bronze.

== First round ==
=== Finland vs Italy ===
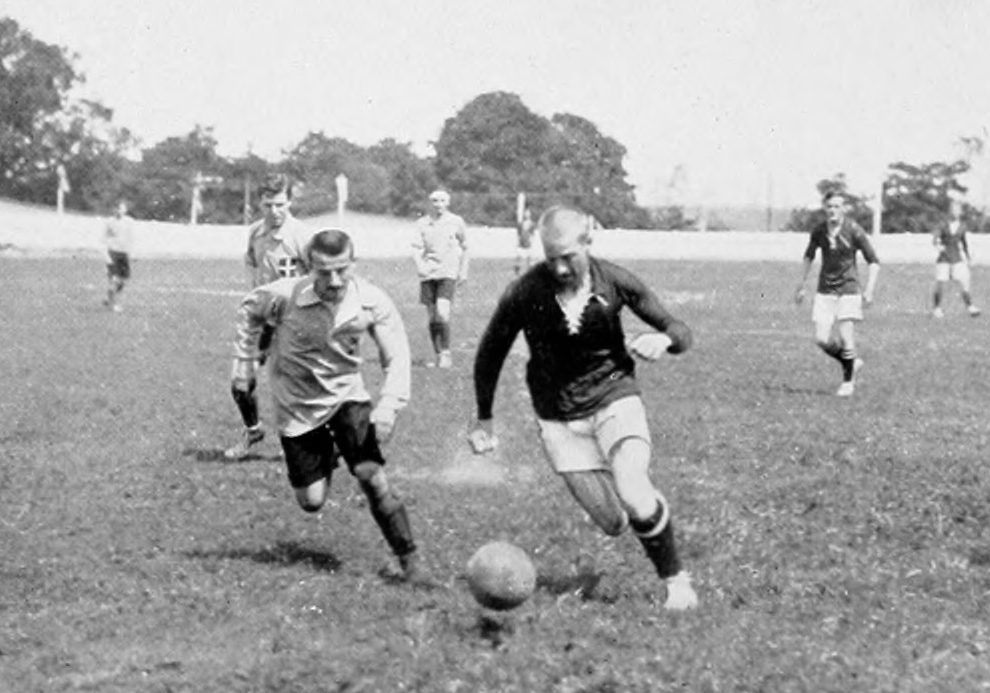
A Finnish player (in dark jersey) carrying the ball

29 June 1912
11:00

Finland	3–2 (a.e.t.)	Italy
Öhman 2'; E. Soinio 40'; Wiberg 105'	Report	Bontadini 10'; Sardi 25'

Tranebergs Idrottsplats, Stockholm
Attendance: 600
Referee: Hugo Meisl (Austria)

Finland
Italy

GK	August Syrjäläinen
DF	Jalmari Holopainen
DF	Gösta Löfgren
MF	Knut Lund
MF	Eino Soinio (capt.)
MF	Kaarlo Soinio
FW	Ragnar Wickström	Substituted off
FW	Bror Wiberg
FW	Artturi Nyyssönen
FW	Jarl Öhman
FW	Algoth Niska
Manager:
(none)

GK	Piero Campelli
DF	Angelo Binaschi
DF	Renzo de Vecchi
MF	Carlo de Marchi	(substituted off) 46'
MF	Giuseppe Milano (c)
MF	Pietro Leone
FW	Enea Zuffi
FW	Franco Bontadini
FW	Felice Berardo
FW	Enrico Sardi
FW	Edoardo Mariani
Substitutes:
MF	Vittorio Morelli	(substituted on) 46' (Note: As substitutions were not allowed until 1958, it was a contravention to the Laws of the Game. Besides, the official report did not mention the incident.)
Manager:
(Italy) Vittorio Pozzo

=== Austria vs Germany ===
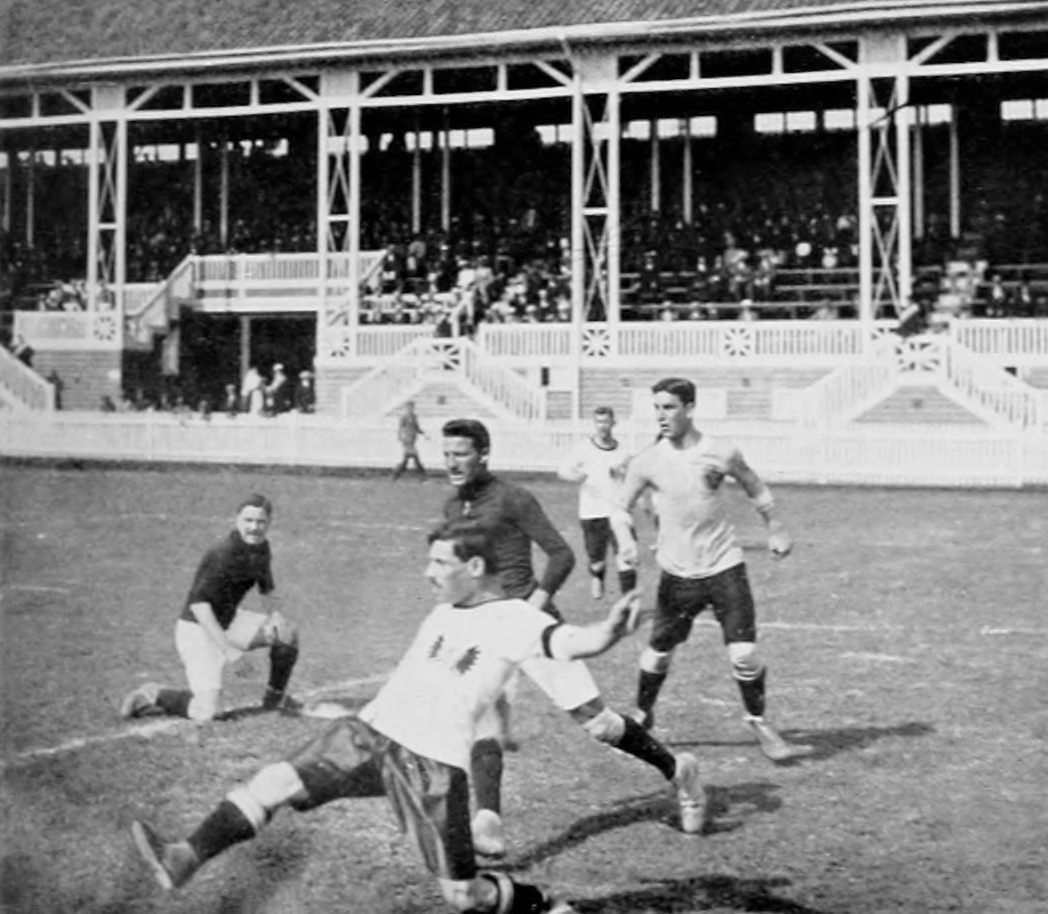
Austria (in white shirts) vs Germany

29 June 1912
15:00

Austria	5–1	Germany
Merz 75', 81'; Studnicka 58'; Neubauer 62'; Cimera 89'	Report	Jäger 35'

Råsunda Stadium, Stockholm
Attendance: 2,000
Referee: Humbert Willing (Netherlands)

Austria
Germany

GK	Otto Noll
DF	Bernhard Graubart
DF	Ladislaus Kurpiel
MF	Josef Brandstätter
MF	Karl Braunsteiner
MF	Robert Cimera
FW	Ludwig Hussak (c)
FW	Alois Müller
FW	Johann Studnicka
FW	Robert Merz
FW	Leopold Neubauer
Manager
(Austria) ÖFB Committee

GK	Albert Weber	(substituted off) 60'
DF	Helmut Röpnack
DF	Ernst Hollstein
MF	Georg Krogmann
MF	Max Breunig
MF	Hermann Bosch
FW	Karl Wegele
FW	Adolf Jäger (c)
FW	Willi Worpitzky	(substituted on) 60'
FW	Eugen Kipp
FW	Julius Hirsch
Manager
(Germany) DFB Committee

=== Sweden vs Netherlands ===
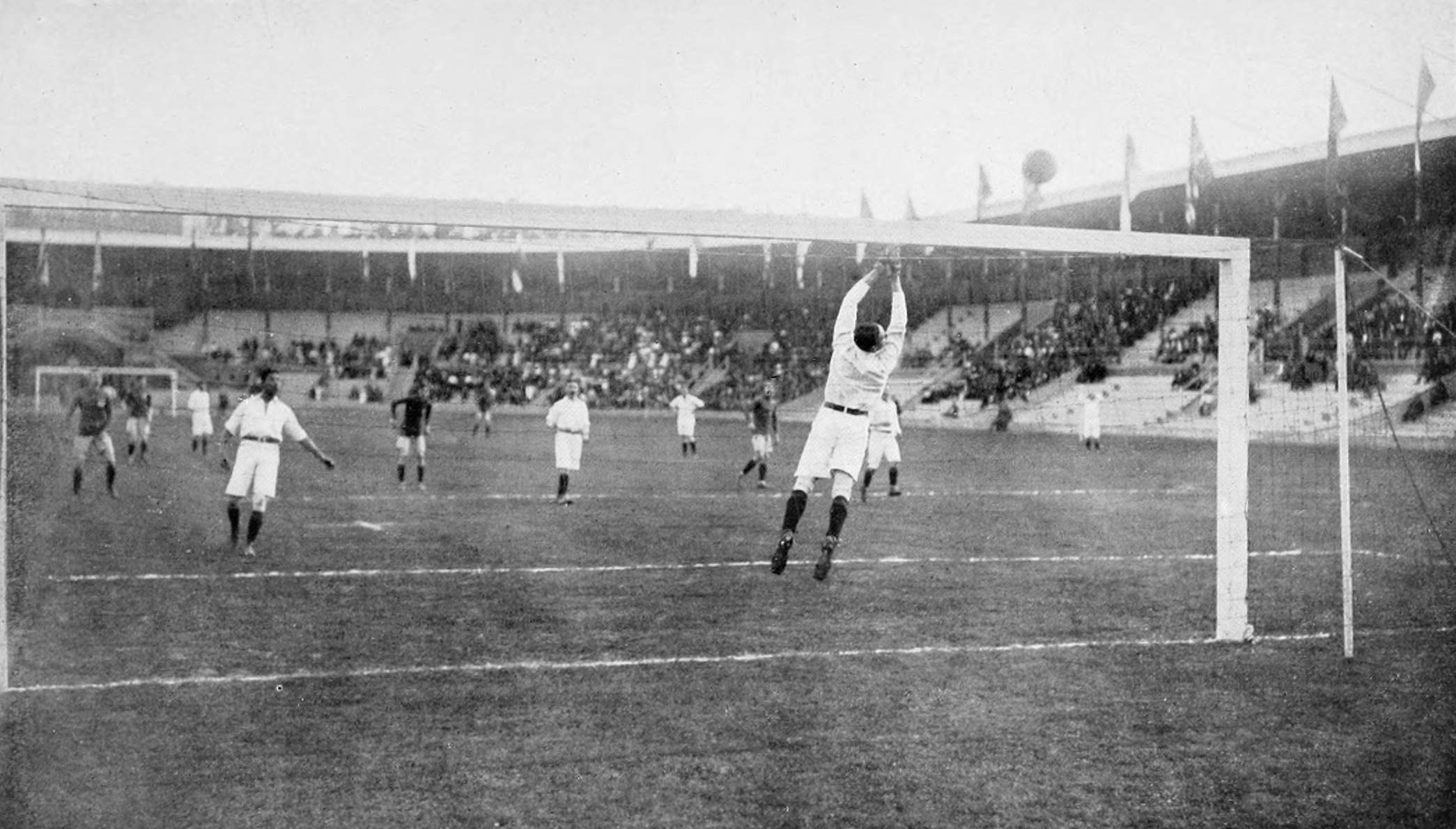
The Netherlands (white shirts) vs. Sweden (dark jerseys). The Dutch keeper Göbel saves

29 June 1912
19:00

Sweden	3–4 (a.e.t.)	Netherlands
Swensson 3', 80'; E. Börjesson 62' (pen.)	Report	Bouvy 28', 52'; Vos 43', 91'

Olympic Stadium, Stockholm
Attendance: 14,000
Referee: George Wagstaffe (England)

Sweden
Netherlands

GK	Josef Börjesson
DF	Jacob Levin
DF	Erik Bergström
MF	Ragnar Wicksell
MF	Gustav Sandberg
MF	Karl Gustafsson
FW	Herman Myhrberg (c)
FW	Ivar Swensson
FW	Erik Börjesson
FW	Helge Ekroth
FW	Karl Ansén
Manager
(Sweden) John Ohlson

GK	Just Göbel
DF	David Wijnveldt
DF	Constant Feith
MF	Nico de Wolf
MF	Bok de Korver
MF	Dirk Lotsy (c)
FW	Jan van Breda Kolff
FW	Huug de Groot
FW	Caesar ten Cate
FW	Jan Vos
FW	Nico Bouvy
Manager
(England) Edgar Chadwick

=== Norway vs France ===
29 June 1912

Norway	2–0 Awarded	France

== Second round ==
=== Finland vs Russia ===
30 June
10:00

Finland	2–1	Russia
Wiberg 30'; Öhman 80'	Report	Butusov 72'

Tranebergs Idrottsplats, Stockholm
Attendance: 200
Referee: Per Sjoblom (Sweden)

Finland
Russia

GK	August Syrjäläinen
DF	Jalmari Holopainen
DF	Gösta Löfgren
MF	Knut Lund
MF	Eino Soinio (c)
MF	Viljo Lietola
FW	Ragnar Wickström
FW	Bror Wiberg
FW	Artturi Nyyssönen
FW	Jarl Öhman
FW	Algoth Niska
Manager
(none)

GK	Lev Favorsky
DF	Pyotr Sokolov
DF	Vladimir Markov
MF	Andrei Akimov
MF	Nikita Khromov
MF	Nikolai Kynin
FW	Mikhail Smirnov
FW	Aleksandr Filippov (c)
FW	Vasily Butusov
FW	Vasily Zhitarev
FW	Sergei Filippov
Manager
(Russia) Robert Fulda and Georgy Dyuperron

=== Great Britain vs Hungary ===
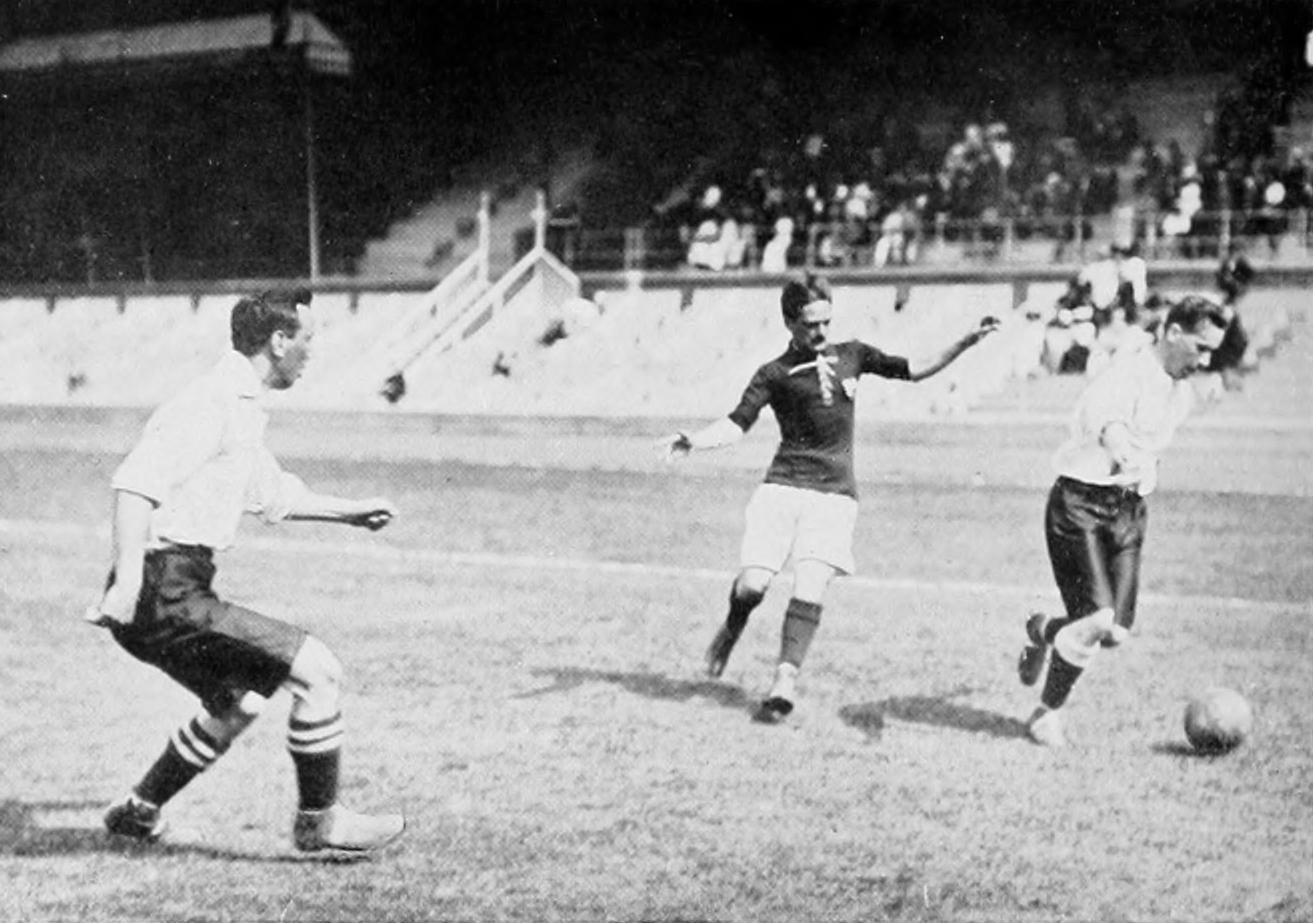
Scene of the match

30 June
13:30

Great Britain	7–0	Hungary
Walden 21', 23', 49', 53', 55', 85'; Woodward 45'	Report

Tranebergs Idrottsplats, Stockholm
Attendance: 8,000
Referee: Christiaan Groothoff (Netherlands)

Great Britain
Hungary

GK	Ronald Brebner
DF	Thomas Burn
DF	Arthur Knight
MF	Henry Littlewort
MF	Edward Hanney
MF	Joseph Dines
FW	Arthur Berry
FW	Vivian Woodward (c)
FW	Harold Walden
FW	Gordon Hoare
FW	Ivan Sharpe
Manager
(England) Adrian Birch

GK	László Domonkos
DF	Gyula Rumbold
DF	Imre Payer
MF	Gyula Bíró
MF	Jenő Károly (c)
MF	Antal Vágó
FW	Béla Sebestyén
FW	Sándor Bodnár
FW	Mihály Pataki
FW	Imre Schlosser
FW	Gáspár Borbás
Manager
(Hungary) Ede Herczog

=== Denmark vs Norway ===
30 June
16:30

Denmark	7–0	Norway
Olsen 4', 70', 88'; S. Nielsen 60', 85'; Wolfhagen 25'; Middelboe 37'	Report

Tranebergs Idrottsplats, Stockholm
Attendance: 700
Referee: Ruben Gelbord (Sweden)

Denmark
Norway

GK	Sophus Hansen
DF	Charles Buchwald
DF	Harald Hansen
MF	Ivar Lykke
MF	Nils Middelboe (c)
MF	Paul Berth
FW	Axel Petersen
FW	Sophus Nielsen
FW	Anthon Olsen
FW	Hjalmar Christoffersen
FW	Vilhelm Wolfhagen
Manager
(Denmark) Louis Østrup

GK	Ingolf Pedersen
RB	Per Skou
LB	Einar Friis Baastad
RH	Harald Johansen
CH	Charles Herlofson (c)
LH	Gunnar Andersen
OR	Henry Reinholdt
IR	Kristian Krefting
CF	Hans Endrerud
IL	Rolf Maartmann
OL	Erling Maartmann
Manager
(England) James V. Hayes

=== Netherlands vs Austria ===
30 June
19:00

Netherlands	3–1	Austria
Bouvy 8' ten Cate 12'; Vos 30'	Report	Müller 41'

Tranebergs Idrottsplats, Stockholm
Attendance: 7,000
Referee: David Philip (Scotland)

GK	Just Göbel
DF	David Wijnveldt
DF	Piet Bouman
MF	Ge Fortgens
MF	Joop Boutmy
MF	Dirk Lotsy (c)
FW	Jan van Breda Kolff
FW	Huug de Groot
FW	Caesar ten Cate
FW	Jan Vos
FW	Nico Bouvy

GK	Otto Noll
DF	Bernhard Graubart
DF	Ladislaus Kurpiel
MF	Josef Brandstätter
MF	Karl Braunsteiner
MF	Robert Cimera
FW	Ludwig Hussak (c)
FW	Alois Müller
FW	Johann Studnicka
FW	Robert Merz
FW	Leopold Neubauer

== Semi finals ==
=== Great Britain vs Finland ===
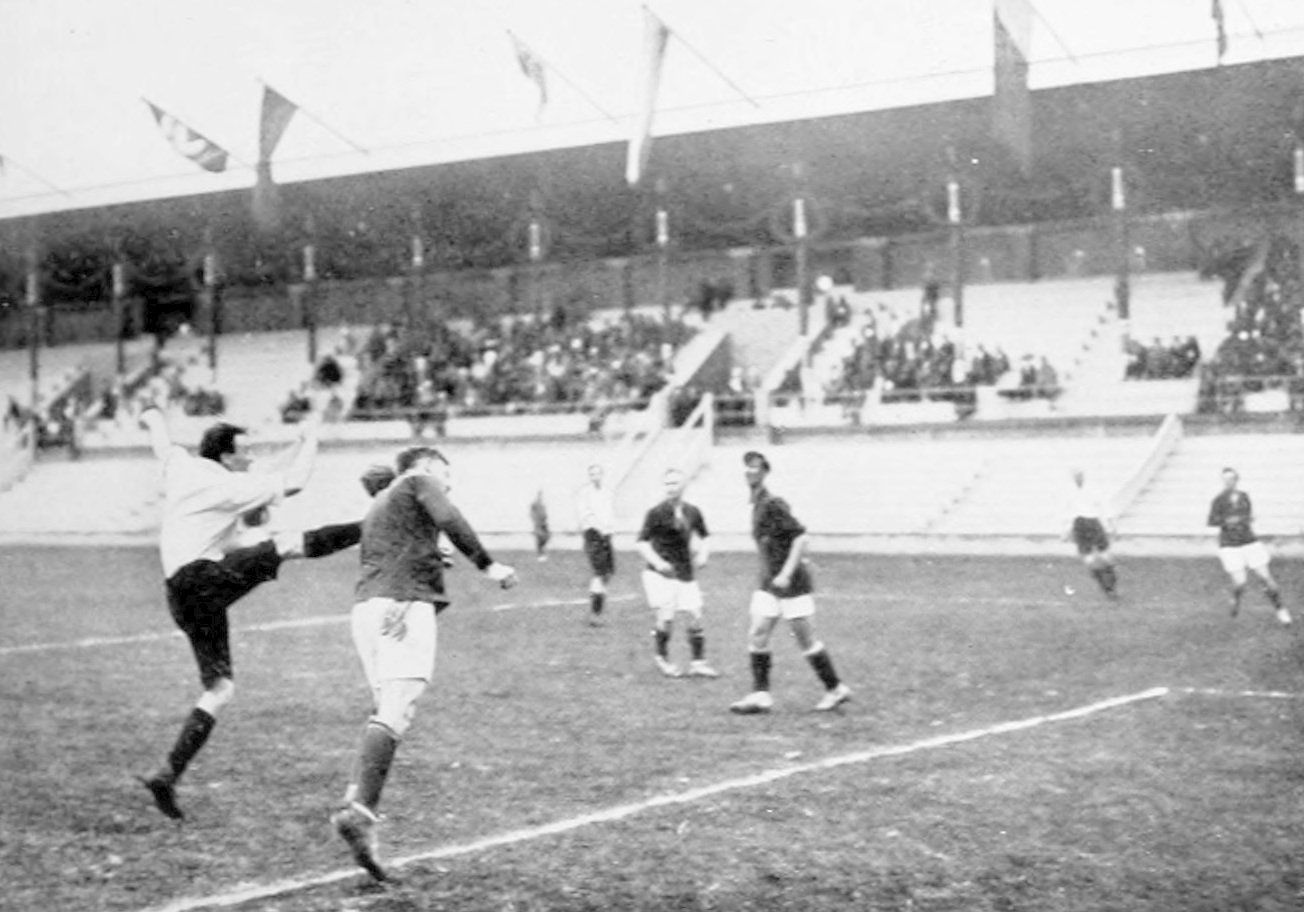
Great Britain in white jerseys against the Finns.

2 July
15:00

Great Britain	4–0	Finland
Holopainen 2' (o.g.); Walden 7', 77'; Woodward 82'	Report

Olympic Stadium, Stockholm
Attendance: 4,000
Referee: Ruben Gelbord (Sweden)

Great Britain
Finland

GK	Ronald Brebner
DF	Thomas Burn
DF	Arthur Knight
MF	Henry Littlewort
MF	Harold Stamper
MF	Joseph Dines
FW	Gordon Wright
FW	Vivian Woodward (c)
FW	Harold Walden
FW	Gordon Hoare
FW	Ivan Sharpe
Manager
(England) Adrian Birch

GK	August Syrjäläinen
DF	Jalmari Holopainen
DF	Gösta Löfgren
MF	Knut Lund
MF	Eino Soinio (c)
MF	Viljo Lietola
FW	Ragnar Wickström
FW	Bror Wiberg
FW	Artturi Nyyssönen
FW	Jarl Öhman
FW	Algoth Niska
Manager
(none)

=== Denmark vs Netherlands ===
2 July
19:00

Denmark	4–1	Netherlands
Olsen 14', 87'; Jørgensen 7'; P. Nielsen 37'	Report	H. Hansen 85' (o.g.)

Olympic Stadium, Stockholm
Attendance: 6,000
Referee: Ede Herczog (Hungary)

Denmark
Netherlands

GK	Sophus Hansen
DF	Nils Middelboe (c)
DF	Harald Hansen
MF	Charles Buchwald
MF	Emil Jørgensen
MF	Paul Berth
FW	Oskar Nielsen
FW	Poul Nielsen	(substituted off) 60'
FW	Anthon Olsen
FW	Sophus Nielsen
FW	Vilhelm Wolfhagen
Manager
(none)

GK	Just Göbel
DF	David Wijnveldt
DF	Piet Bouman
MF	Ge Fortgens
MF	Joop Boutmy
MF	Dirk Lotsy (c)
FW	Jan van Breda Kolff
FW	Huug de Groot
FW	Caesar ten Cate
FW	Jan Vos
FW	vNico Bouvy
Manager
(England) Edgar Chadwick

== Bronze medal game ==
=== Netherlands vs Finland ===
4 July
15:00

Netherlands	9–0	Finland
Vos 29', 43', 46', 74', 78' van der Sluis 24', 57' de Groot 28', 86'	Report

Råsunda, Solna, Stockholm
Attendance: 1,000
Referee: Per Sjoblom (Sweden)

Netherlands
Finland

GK	Just Göbel
DF	David Wijnveldt
DF	Constant Feith
MF	Nico de Wolf
MF	Joop Boutmy
MF	Dirk Lotsy (c)
FW	Jan van Breda Kolff
FW	Huug de Groot
FW	Jan van der Sluis
FW	Jan Vos
FW	Nico Bouvy
Manager
(England) Edgar Chadwick

GK	August Syrjäläinen
DF	Jalmari Holopainen
DF	Gösta Löfgren
MF	Knut Lund
MF	Eino Soinio (capt.)
MF	Viljo Lietola
FW	Lauri Tanner
FW	Bror Wiberg
FW	Artturi Nyyssönen
FW	Jarl Öhman
FW	Algoth Niska
Manager
(none)

== Final ==
=== Great Britain vs Denmark ===
1912 Summer Olympics Football Final
4 July
19:00

Great Britain	4–2	Denmark
Hoare 22', 41', Walden 10'; Berry 43'	Report	Olsen 27', 81'

Olympic Stadium, Stockholm
Attendance: 25,000
Referee: Christiaan Groothoff (Netherlands)

Great Britain
Denmark

GK	Ronald Brebner
DF	Thomas Burn
DF	Arthur Knight
MF	Douglas McWhirter
MF	Henry Littlewort
MF	James Dines
FW	Arthur Berry
FW	Vivian Woodward
FW	Harold Walden
FW	Gordon Hoare
FW	Ivan Sharpe
Head Coach:
(England) Adrian Birch

GK	Sophus Hansen
DF	Nils Middelboe
DF	Harald Hansen
MF	Charles Buchwald
MF	Emil Jorgensen
MF	Paul Berth
FW	Oskar Nielsen
FW	Axel Thufason
FW	Anthon Olsen
FW	Sophus Nielsen
FW	Vilhelm Wolfhagen
Head Coach:
Charlie Williams
