= Juvenal Olmos =

Chilean football manager (born 1962)

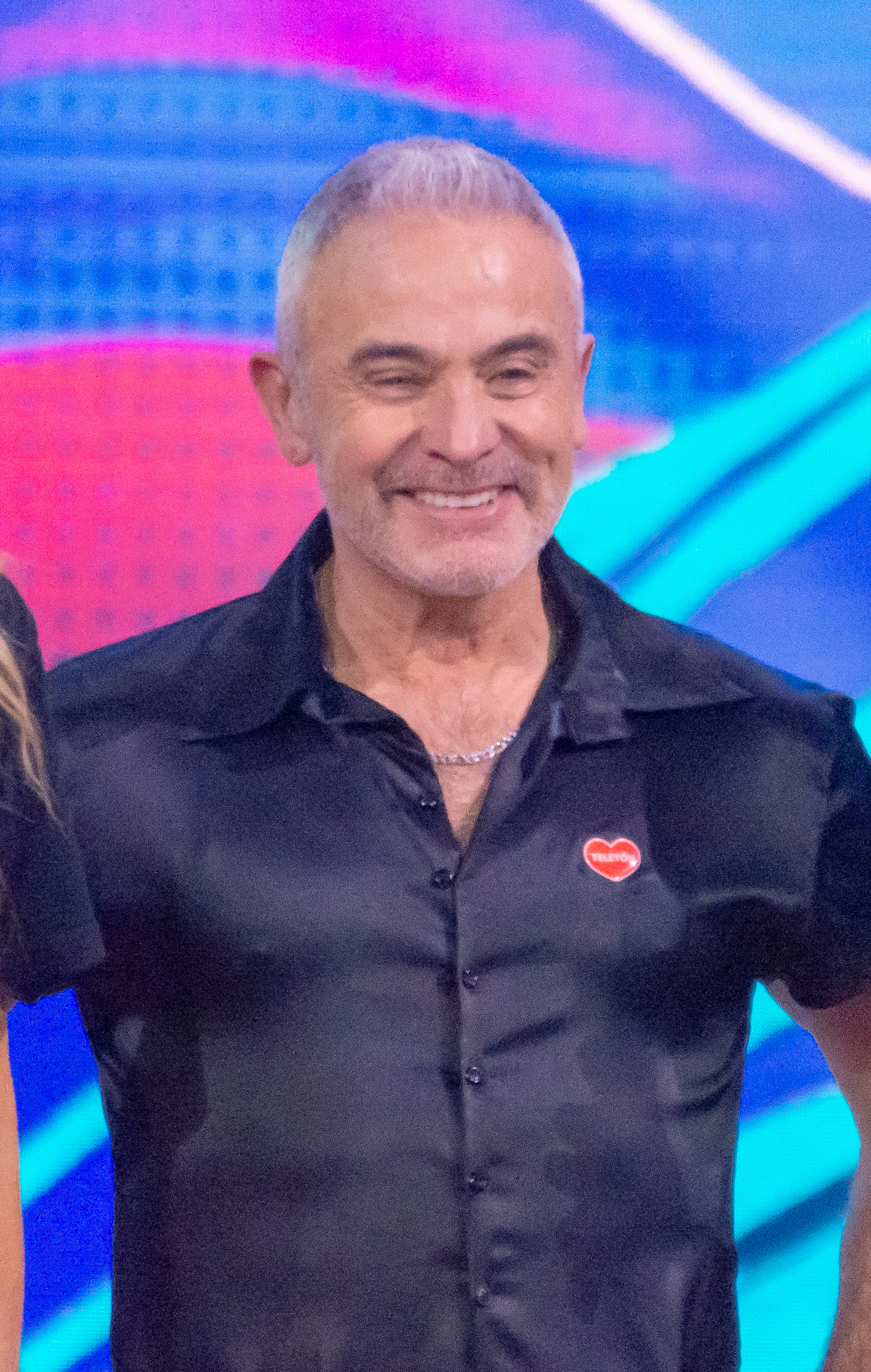
- Olmos at the Teletón in 2023

Personal information
- Full name: Juvenal Mario Olmos Rojas
- Date of birth: October 4, 1962 (age 64)
- Place of birth: Santiago, Chile
- Position: Midfielder

Youth career
- Universidad Católica

Senior career*
Years	Team	Apps	(Gls)
1981–1984	Universidad Católica	8	(2)
1985–1986	KSV Waregem	5	(0)
1986–1989	Universidad Católica		
1989–1990	Irapuato		
1991	Deportes Antofagasta		
1992–1993	O'Higgins		
1994–1995	Universidad Católica		

International career
1989	Chile	10	(2)

Managerial career
- Universidad Católica (youth)
- 1999–2001: Unión Española
- 2001–2002: Universidad Católica
- 2003–2005: Chile
- 2004: Chile U23
- 2005: Newell's Old Boys
- 2006–2007: Everton
- 2018: Veracruz
- 2026–: Lautaro de Buin (sport manager)
- * Club domestic league appearances and goals

Juvenal Mario Olmos Rojas (born October 4, 1962) is a Chilean football manager and former player.

== Playing career ==
Olmos was born in Santiago de Chile. At Universidad Católica, he had as teammates Pablo Yoma, Marco Cornez, Miguel Ángel Neira, Mario Lepe, Raimundo Tupper, Luka Tudor and Osvaldo Hurtado.

== Managerial career ==
His management of the Chile national team was unsuccessful, as they failed to get past the first round in Copa América 2004 and he was later fired, five games before the end of the qualifying round for the 2006 FIFA World Cup.

In June 2026, Olmos assumed as sport manager of Lautaro de Buin.

== Media career ==
In 2006, Olmos competed and won the Chilean talent show El Baile en TVN (The Dance on TVN).

Olmos was a candidate to deputy for District 24 (La Reina and Peñalolén) in the 2009 Chilean parliamentary election as a member of National Renewal. In 2021, he was elected councillor for La Reina commune.

Olmos has worked as a football commentator for TNT Sports Chile, formerly Canal del Fútbol (CDF) (Channel of Football).

== Honours ==
=== Player ===
Universidad Católica

- Primera División de Chile: 1984,1987
  Copa Interamericana: 1994
  Copa Chile: 1983, Copa República 1983, 1995

=== Manager ===
Unión Española

- Primera B: 1999

Universidad Católica

- Primera División de Chile: Apertura 2002
