= Marco Cornez =

Chilean footballer (1957–2022)

Personal information
- Full name: Marco Antonio Cornez Bravo
- Date of birth: 15 October 1957
- Place of birth: Valparaíso, Chile
- Date of death: 21 May 2022 (aged 64)
- Position: Goalkeeper

Senior career*
Years	Team	Apps	(Gls)
1975-1976	Palestino		
1977	Deportes Linares		
1978-1979	Palestino		
1980	Magallanes		
1981-1983	Palestino		
1984-1985	Universidad Católica		
1986	Palestino		
1987-1990	Universidad Católica		
1991-1993	Deportes Antofagasta		
1994	Regional Atacama		
1995	Everton		
1996	Deportes Iquique		
1997	Coquimbo Unido		
1998	Palestino		

International career
1983-1995	Chile	22	(0)
- * Club domestic league appearances and goals

Marco Antonio Cornez Bravo (15 October 1957 – 21 May 2022) was a Chilean footballer who played as a goalkeeper who for Club Deportivo Palestino, Universidad Católica, Deportes Antofagasta, Everton and Deportes Iquique, scoring 24 goals between 1975 and 1998.

Cornez was an unused reserve goalkeeper for Chile at the 1982 FIFA World Cup. His international career lasted from 1982 to 1995, during which time he won 20 caps. At Católica, he had as teammates Juvenal Olmos, Pablo Yoma, Miguel Ángel Neira, Mario Lepe, Raimundo Tupper, Luka Tudor and Osvaldo Hurtado.

He discovered Christiane Endler.

He died on 21 May 2022 from stomach cancer that was diagnosed several months earlier.

== Personal life ==
Cornez was the biological father of Nicolás Córdova.
