= Miguel Ángel Neira =

Chilean footballer (born 1952)

Personal information
- Full name: Miguel Ángel Neira Pincheira
- Date of birth: October 9, 1952 (age 74)
- Place of birth: Chiguayante, Chile
- Height: 1.73 m (5 ft 8 in)
- Position: Midfielder

Senior career*
Years	Team	Apps	(Gls)
1974	Huachipato		
1976	Unión Española		
1979–1981	O'Higgins		
1982–1987	Universidad Católica		

International career
1976–1985	Chile	45	(4)
- * Club domestic league appearances and goals

Miguel Ángel Neira Pincheira (born October 9, 1952) is a retired football midfielder from Chile, who represented his native country at the 1982 FIFA World Cup, wearing the number twenty jersey.

He played club football for O'Higgins, Unión Española and Club Deportivo Universidad Católica in Chile. At Católica, he had as teammates Juvenal Olmos, Pablo Yoma, Marco Cornez, Mario Lepe, Raimundo Tupper, Luka Tudor and Osvaldo Hurtado.

For his native country he was capped 45 times, scoring 4 goals between 1976 and 1985, and making his debut on October 6, 1976, in a friendly match against Uruguay.

== Championships ==
=== National championships ===
Title	Club	País	Year
Copa Chile	Universidad Católica	Chile	1983
Copa República	Universidad Católica	Chile	1983
Primera División de Chile	Universidad Católica	Chile	1984
Primera División de Chile	Universidad Católica	Chile	1987

=== Other championships ===
Title	Club	País	Year
Liguilla Pre-Libertadores	Universidad Católica	Chile	1985

=== Friendly championships ===
Title	Club	País	Year
Trofeo Ciutat de Palma	Universidad Católica	Chile	1984
Trofeo Ciudad de Alicante	Universidad Católica	Chile	1985
