= Osvaldo Hurtado (footballer) =

Chilean footballer and manager (born 1957)

Personal information
- Full name: Osvaldo Heriberto Hurtado Galleguillos
- Date of birth: November 2, 1957 (age 68)
- Place of birth: Arica, Chile
- Height: 1.75 m (5 ft 9 in)
- Position: Forward

Youth career
- 1966–1970: Santiago Wanderers Arica
- 1971–1972: Estibadores Marítimos
- 1972–1975: Lito Contreras

Senior career*
| Years | Team | Apps | (Gls) |
| 1975–1978 | Deportes La Serena | | |
| 1979 | Unión Española | 33 | (11) |
| 1980–1985 | Universidad Católica | 121 | (47) |
| 1981 | → O'Higgins (loan) | 17 | (1) |
| 1985–1986 | Cádiz | 25 | (3) |
| 1986 | Filanbanco | | |
| 1987–1988 | Universidad Católica | 36 | (21) |
| 1988–1991 | Charleroi | 74 | (19) |
| 1991 | Deportes Concepción | 9 | (2) |
| 1992 | Alianza Lima | | |
| 1992–1995 | Deportes Arica | | |

International career
| 1983–1989 | Chile | 38 | (4) |

Managerial career
- 1995: Deportes Arica
- 2005–2006: Chile U20 (women)
- 2007–2008: Provincial Osorno
- 2008–2014: Magallanes
- 2015: Municipal Salamanca
- 2016: San Marcos (youth)
- 2017: Municipal Salamanca
- 2017–2022: Deportes Santa Cruz
- * Club domestic league appearances and goals

Osvaldo Heriberto Hurtado Galleguillos (born November 2, 1957) is a Chilean football manager and former player who played as a forward.

== Club career ==
Nicknamed Arica due to his city of birth, Hurtado started his career with Deportes La Serena in 1976. In Chile, he became a historical player of Universidad Católica, winning four titles alongside players such as Juvenal Olmos, Pablo Yoma, Marco Cornez, Miguel Ángel Neira, Mario Lepe, Raimundo Tupper and Luka Tudor.

Abroad, Hurtado played for Cádiz in Spain, Filanbanco in Ecuador, Charleroi in Belgium and Alianza Lima in Peru.

== International career ==
Hurtado earned 38 caps for the Chile national team and scored 6 goals.

== Coaching career ==
Hurtado led the Chile women's national U20 team in the 2006 South American Championship.

== Personal life ==
Hurtado is the brother-in-law of the Chilean former international footballer Francisco Ugarte.

In November 2023, Hurtado was honored as Hijo Ilustre (Illustrious Son) of his hometown, Arica.
