= Pablo Yoma =

Chilean footballer (born 1952)

Personal information
- Full name: Pablo Yoma Syrjäläinen
- Date of birth: July 9, 1962 (age 64)
- Height: 1.92 m (6 ft 4 in)
- Position: Defender

Youth career
- Universidad Católica

Senior career*
Years	Team	Apps	(Gls)
1981–1992	Universidad Católica	185	(11)
1991	→ Everton (loan)	17	(4)
1992	→ Fernández Vial (loan)	13	(1)
Total		215	(16)
- * Club domestic league appearances and goals

Pablo Yoma Syrjäläinen (born July 9, 1962) is a retired football defender from Chile.

== Career ==
He played club football for Universidad Católica, Everton and Fernández Vial in Chile. At Universidad Católica, he achieved the greatest successes of his career, beginning with the title of the U-19 Croix International Tournament, considered a youth club world championship at the time, and titles in the Chilean Primera División tournaments of 1984 and 1987, among others. At Católica, he had as teammates Juvenal Olmos, Marco Cornez, Mario Lepe, Miguel Ángel Neira, Raimundo Tupper, Luka Tudor and Osvaldo Hurtado.

== Personal life ==
His maternal grandfather, August Syrjäläinen, was the goalkeeper for Finland at the 1912 Summer Olympics. In addition, his father, Pedro Yoma, was a Chilean athlete who competed in 400 metres hurdles at the 1952 Summer Olympics.

== Honours ==
=== National championships ===
Title	Club	País	Year
Copa Chile	Universidad Católica	Chile	1983
Copa República	Universidad Católica	Chile	1983
Chilean Primera División	Universidad Católica	Chile	1984
Chilean Primera División	Universidad Católica	Chile	1987

=== International tournaments ===
Title	Club	País	Year
U-19 International Croix Tournament	Universidad Católica	Chile	1980
