= Soinio =

Soinio is a Finnish surname. Notable people with the surname include:

- Eino Soinio (1894–1973), Finnish football player
- Kaarlo Soinio (1888–1960), Finnish gymnast and football player, brother of Eino
- Olli Soinio (1948–2018), Finnish film director, screenwriter, and film editor
