= August Syrjäläinen =

Finnish footballer (1891-1960)

August Matias Syrjäläinen (24 April 1891 – 18 May 1960) was a Finnish football (soccer) goalkeeper who competed in the 1912 Summer Olympics.

Syrjäläinen was born in Viipuri, Grand Duchy of Finland. He was a part of the Finland football team, which finished fourth in the football event. He participated in all four matches in the main tournament.

He played 5 full international matches for the Finnish team.

Syrjäläinen died in Espoo at the age of 69 in 1960.

== Personal life ==
Syrjäläinen was the maternal grandfather of Chilean footballer Pablo Yoma. Yoma's father was Chilean hurdler Pedro Yoma, who had met Syrjäläinen's daughter at the 1952 Summer Olympics held in Helsinki, Finland.
