= Jalmari Holopainen =

Finnish footballer (1892-1954)

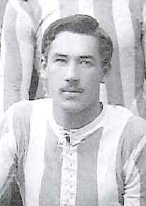

Personal information
- Full name: Hjalmar Holopainen
- Date of birth: 29 June 1892
- Place of birth: Finland
- Date of death: 3 April 1954 (aged 61)
- Place of death: Finland
- Position: Defender

Senior career*
| Years | Team | Apps | (Gls) |
| 1910s | HJK Helsinki | | |

International career
| 1911–1912 | Finland | 6 | (0) |
- * Club domestic league appearances and goals

Hjalmar "Jalmari" Holopainen (29 June 1892 – 3 April 1954) was a Finnish football player who competed in the 1912 Summer Olympics. He was a defender. In the 1912 Summer Olympics, he played all four matches that Finland competed. In the semi-final against Great Britain, he scored the first own goal in the history of major international football tournaments. During his career, he played the first six international matches with the Finland national team.

He was part of the HJK (Helsingin Jalkapalloklubi). When Jalmari Holopainen played in the team, HJK won the Finnish Championship in 1911, 1912, 1917 and 1918.

Jalmari Holopainen died at age 62 in 1954.
