= Pedro Yoma =

Chilean hurdler

Pedro Yoma (April 28, 1927 – August 21, 2009) was a Chilean athlete. He competed in the Men's 400m Hurdles in the 1952 Summer Olympics. He also won bronze in the 1952 South American Championships in Athletics in the same event.

== Personal life ==
Yoma was the father of footballer Pablo Yoma, whose mother was the daughter of Finnish footballer August Syrjäläinen. Yoma had met her at the 1952 Summer Olympics held in Helsinki, Finland. The couple married in Finland and lived there together for a period of time before moving to Chile in 1956.

== International competitions ==
Year	Competition	Venue	Position	Event	Notes
Representing Chile
1952	South American Championships	Buenos Aires, Argentina	3rd	400 m hurdles	54.6
1952	Olympic Games	Helsinki, Finland	36th (h)	400 m hurdles	57.03
