= Jarl Öhman =

Finnish footballer (1891-1936 )

Jarl ("Lali") Öhman (14 November 1891 in Helsinki – 20 January 1936 in Kokkola) was a Finnish amateur footballer who was included in the Finland football team for the 1912 Summer Olympics football event, which he appeared in all four matches, making two goals. Finland finished fourth for the main tournament.

He was the inaugural manager of the Finland national football team.
