= Kaarlo Soinio =

Finnish footballer and gymnast (1888-1960)

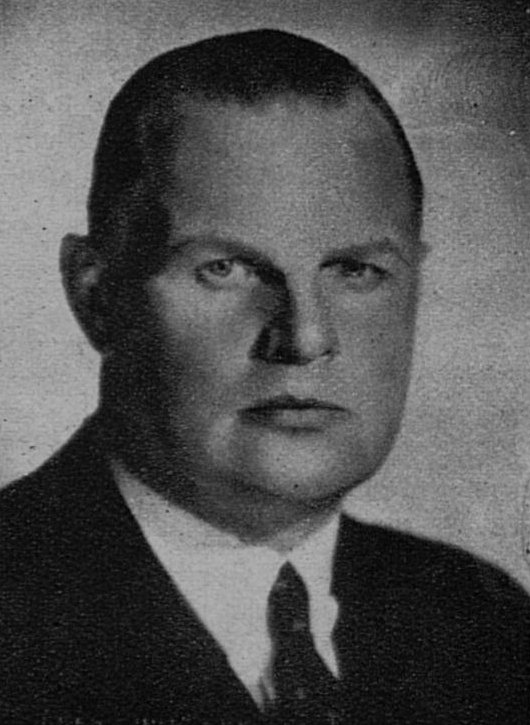

Personal information
- Full name: Kaarlo Eino Kyösti Soinio
- Nickname: Keppari
- National team: Finland
- Born: Karl Gustaf Salin; 28 January 1888 Helsinki, Grand Duchy of Finland, Russian Empire
- Died: 24 October 1960 (aged 72) Helsinki, Finland
- Occupations: Gymnastics teacher, editor-in-chief, assistant police chief, head of department, chief executive officer

Sport
- Sport: Association football
- Club: Helsingin Jalkapalloklubi

Gymnastics career
- Discipline: Men's artistic gymnastics
- Country represented: Finland
- Club: Ylioppilasvoimistelijat
Medal record
Men's artistic gymnastics
Representing Finland
Olympic Games
| Bronze medal – third place | 1908 London | Team |

Kaarlo Eino Kyösti Soinio (28 January 1888 – 24 October 1960) was a Finnish sportsperson who won Olympic bronze, and a sports leader and a sports reporter.

== Sport ==
He was a pioneer in developing football, sports reporting, and municipal sports administration in Finland in the early 20th century. He also won an Olympic bronze in gymnastics.

=== Olympics ===
Kaarlo Soinio at the Olympic Games
| Games | Sport | Event | Rank | Notes |
|---|---|---|---|---|
| 1908 Summer Olympics | Gymnastics | Men's team | 3rd | Source: |
| 1912 Summer Olympics | Football | Men's tournament | 4th | Was team captain. Played only in a first round match against Italy where he was injured. |

=== Footballer ===
International football matches of Kaarlo Soinio
| Date | Venue | Home | Result | Visitor | Competition | Notes |
|---|---|---|---|---|---|---|
| 22 October 1911 | Eläintarha Stadium, Helsinki, Grand Duchy of Finland, Russian Empire | Finland | 2–5 | Sweden | Friendly | Played as captain. First international match of Finland. |
| 27 June 1912 | Råsunda Stadium, Solna, Sweden | Sweden | 7–1 | Finland | Olympic preparation | Played as captain |
| 29 June 1912 | Tranebergs Idrottsplats, Stockholm, Sweden | Finland | 3–2 ET | Italy | 1912 Summer Olympics | Played as captain |

He won the Finnish championship in 1911 and 1912 playing for Helsingin Jalkapalloklubi.

=== Other ===
He was an international referee in one football and one bandy match.

He sat on the board of the Football Association of Finland in various positions from 1910 to 1934. In their centennial history, Soinio is named the board's most distinguished member. He is the association's honorary member.

He also flourished in javelin throwing and rowing.

He was the editor-in-chief of Suomen Urheilulehti in 1913–1917, and a sportsreporter in Helsingin Sanomat in 1918–1957.

== Career ==
He was active in the early Scout Movement in Finland and did the first Finnish translation of Scouting for Boys.

He graduated as a gymnastics teacher from the University of Helsinki in 1912 and worked in that profession in various schools.

He belonged to the Helsinki White Guard during the Finnish Civil War.

He was the assistant police chief of Helsinki in 1924–1932. At the time he remained friends with footballer and smuggler Algoth Niska. He was forced to resign due to right-wing political pressure.

He was the secretary of the Helsinki municipal sports board in 1919–1944. He was the head of the Helsinki folkpark department in 1932–1945. He was the head of the Helsinki sporting office in 1945–1955. He was in the venue committee of the Helsinki Summer Olympics. He was the manager of the Helsinki ice stadium in 1955–1960.

== Family ==
His parents were butcher Gustaf Aleksander Salin and Fredrika Ahlfors.

He finnicized his name from Karl Gustaf Salin to Kaarlo Eino Kyösti Soinio in 1906.

Footballer Eino Soinio was his brother.

He dated a woman for 27 years until they broke up amicably.

== Sources ==
- Siukonen, Markku (2001). Urheilukunniamme puolustajat. Suomen olympiaedustajat 1906–2000. Suuri olympiateos (in Finnish). Jyväskylä: Graface. p. 314. ISBN 951-98673-1-7.
