= Joop Boutmy =

Dutch footballer (1894–1972)

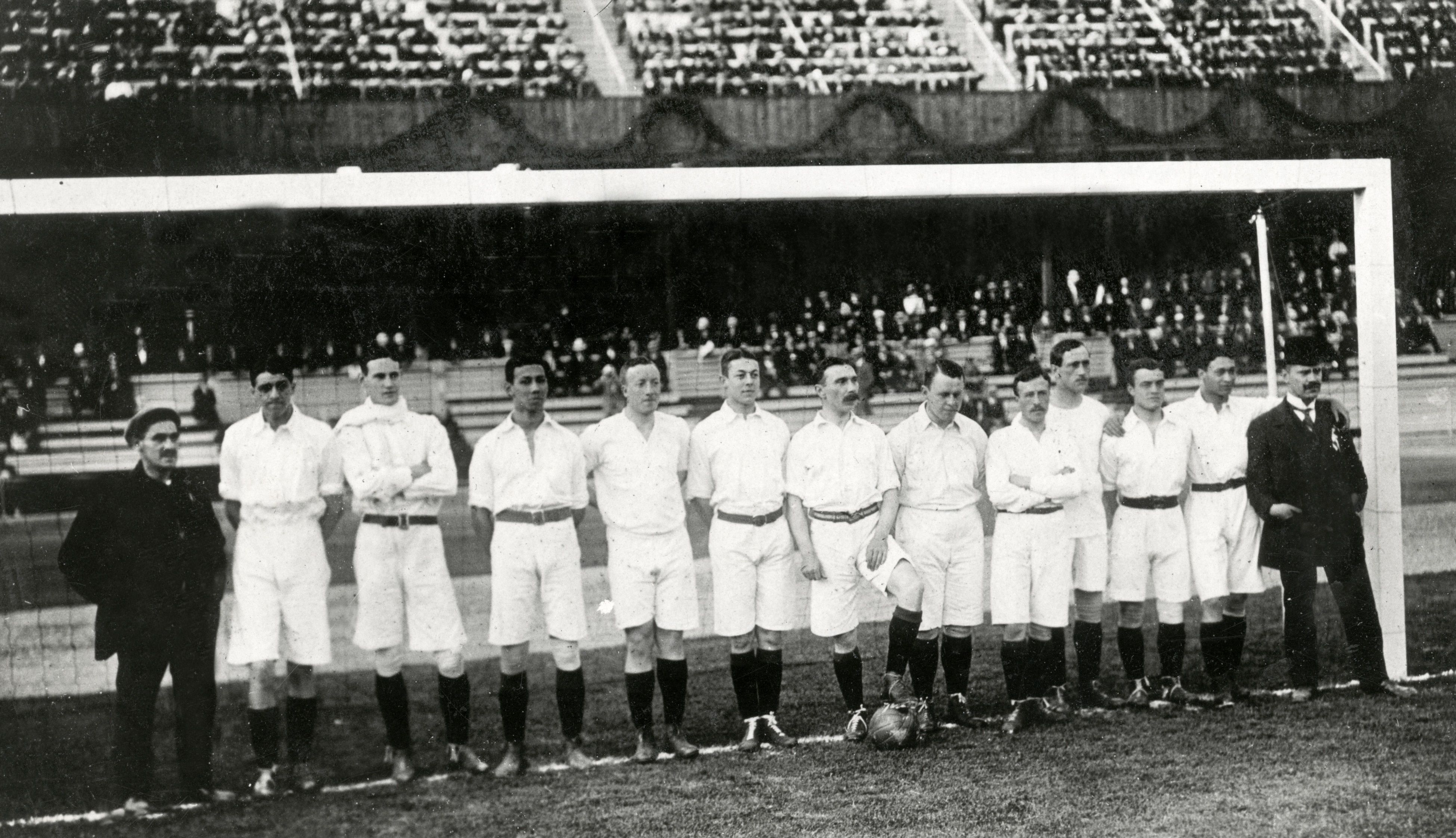
- Football at the 1912 Summer Olympics - Netherlands squad

Personal information
- Full name: Johannes Wouter Boutmy
- Date of birth: 29 April 1894
- Place of birth: Georgetown, Penang, Straits Settlements
- Date of death: 26 July 1972 (aged 78)
- Place of death: Verona, New Jersey, US
- Position: Midfielder

Senior career*
Years	Team	Apps	(Gls)
1910–1915	HBS		
1916–1918	Langkat SV		
1918–1919	HBS		
1922	HBS		

International career
1912–1914	Netherlands	10	(1)
- * Club domestic league appearances and goals

Medal record

Men's football

Representing Netherlands

Olympic Games
Bronze medal – third place	1912 Stockholm	Team competition

Johannes Wouter "Joop" Boutmy (29 April 1894 – 26 July 1972) was a Dutch amateur footballer who competed in the 1912 Summer Olympics.

== Club career ==
He played 89 matches for HBS Craeyenhout, scoring 6 goals between 1910 and 1922.

== International career ==
Boutmy made his debut for the Netherlands in a June 1912 Summer Olympics match against Austria and earned a total of 10 caps, scoring 1 goal. His final international was a May 1914 friendly match against Denmark. He won the bronze medal with the Dutch at the 1912 Summer Olympics football tournament.

== Personal life ==
Boutmy moved to the Dutch East Indies and later to Verona, New Jersey, where he died on 26 July 1972, aged 78.
