= Jan van Breda Kolff (footballer) =

Dutch footballer

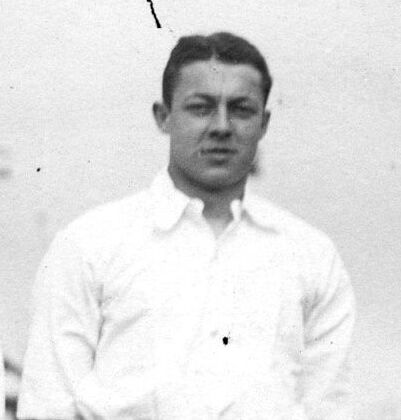
- Jan van Breda Kolff in 1912

Personal information
- Full name: Jan Gualtherus van Breda Kolff
- Date of birth: 18 January 1894
- Place of birth: Medan, Dutch East Indies
- Date of death: 6 February 1976 (aged 82)
- Place of death: West Chatham, United States
- Position: Forward

Senior career*
Years	Team	Apps	(Gls)
1910–1915	HVV Den Haag		

International career
1911–1913	Netherlands	11	(1)
Medal record
Men's football
Representing Netherlands
Summer Olympics
Bronze medal – third place	1912 Stockholm	Team competition
- * Club domestic league appearances and goals

Jan Gualtherus van Breda Kolff (18 January 1894 – 6 February 1976) was a Dutch amateur football player.

== International career ==
Van Breda Kolff made his debut in the Netherlands national team as a player of HVV Den Haag on 2 April 1911 at the age of 17, and (as of 2014) he still holds the record as the youngest player to have ever played for "Oranje". During his debut in a 3–1 win over Belgium he scored the second goal to give the Dutch a 2–0 lead. This also by default made him the youngest goalscorer in the team's history. In total, he played 11 international matches, including four games at the 1912 Summer Olympics, where he won the bronze medal in a 9–0 win over Finland. The goal he scored in his international debut was the only goal he scored in his 11 caps.

== Personal life ==
Van Breda Kolff emigrated to the United States in 1924 and later had a career as a stockbroker. His son Butch van Breda Kolff and grandson Jan van Breda Kolff both were American professional basketball players who later became coaches.
