= Artturi Nyyssönen =

Finnish footballer (1892–1973)

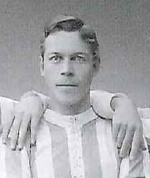
- Artturi Nyyssönen in 1911

Personal information
- Date of birth: 1 May 1892
- Place of birth: Helsinki, Finland
- Date of death: 7 September 1973 (aged 81)
- Place of death: Keski-Suomi, Finland

International career
Years	Team	Apps	(Gls)
- Finland

Artturi Nyyssönen (1 May 1892 – 7 September 1973) was a Finnish obstetrician and footballer. He competed in the men's tournament at the 1912 Summer Olympics.
