= Vittorio Morelli di Popolo =

Italian footballer (1888–1963)

Personal information
- Date of birth: 11 May 1888
- Place of birth: Turin, Kingdom of Italy
- Date of death: 1 April 1963 (aged 74)
- Place of death: Turin, Italy
- Position: Defender

Senior career*
Years	Team	Apps	(Gls)
1907–1915	Torino	81	(11)

International career
1912	Italy	1	(0)

Managerial career
- 1930–1931: Torino
- * Club domestic league appearances and goals

Vittorio Morelli of the counts of Popolo of the Marquis of Ticineto (Italian pronunciation: [vitˈtɔːrjo moˈrɛlli di ˈpɔːpolo]; 11 May 1888 – 1 April 1963) was an Italian footballer who played as a defender. He competed for Italy in the men's football tournament at the 1912 Summer Olympics.
