= Ragnar Wickström =

Finnish footballer (1892–1950)

Personal information
- Date of birth: 12 November 1892
- Place of birth: Mikkeli, Finland
- Date of death: 25 December 1950 (aged 58)

International career
Years	Team	Apps	(Gls)
- Finland

Ragnar Wickström (12 November 1892 – 25 December 1950) was a Finnish footballer. He competed in the men's tournament at the 1912 Summer Olympics.
