= Henry Littlewort =

English footballer (1882–1934)

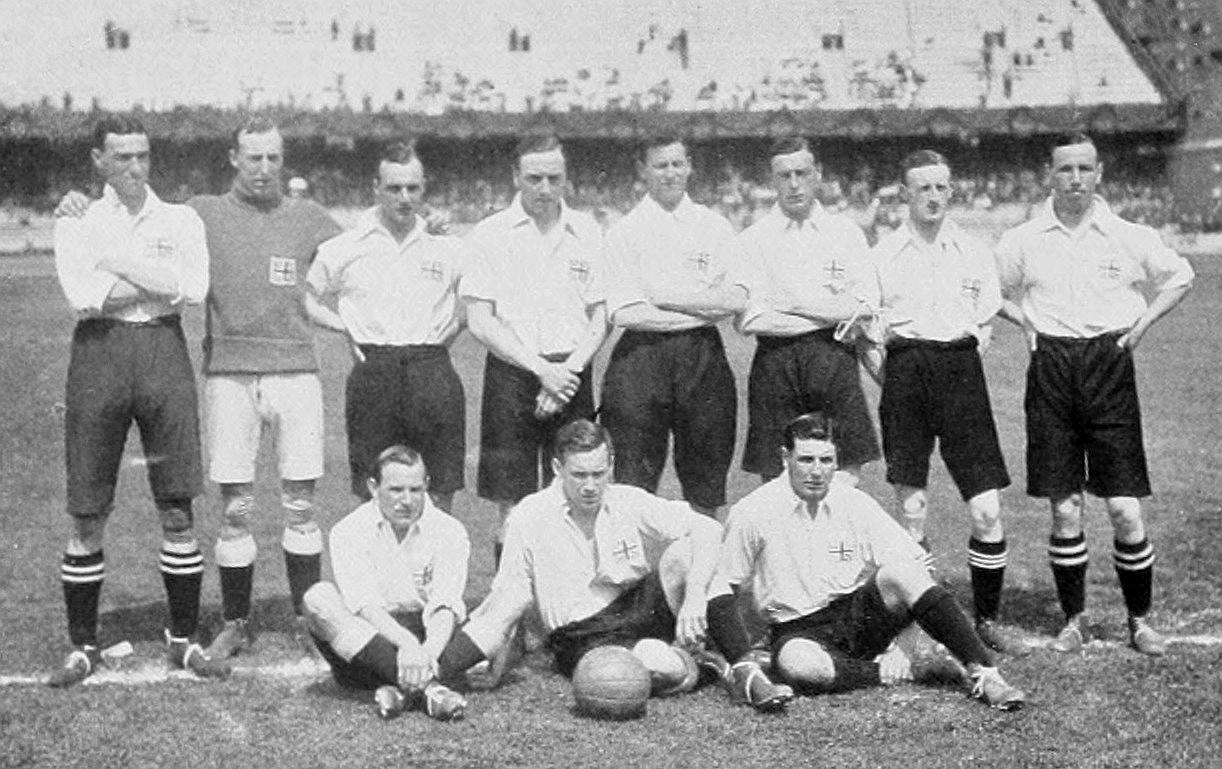

Personal information
- Full name: Henry Charles Littlewort
- Date of birth: 7 July 1882
- Place of birth: Elmsett, England
- Date of death: 21 November 1934 (aged 52)
- Height: 5 ft 11 1/2 in (1.82 m)
- Position: Wing half

Senior career*
Years	Team	Apps	(Gls)
- West Norwood
1906–1907	Crystal Palace	1	(0)
- West Norwood
1908	Fulham	4	(0)
- Shepherd's Bush
- West Norwood
1909–1913	Glossop	73	(3)
1919	Arsenal	0	(0)

International career
1911–1913	England Amateurs	9	(0)
1912	Great Britain	3	(0)
Medal record
Men's football
Representing Great Britain
Gold medal – first place	1912 Stockholm	Team competition
- * Club domestic league appearances and goals

Henry Charles Littlewort (7 July 1882 – 21 November 1934) was an English amateur footballer who competed in the 1912 Summer Olympics.

He was part of the English team, which won the gold medal in the football tournament. He played all three matches.

Littlewort played one match for Crystal Palace on 19 January 1907. Littlewort played as a centre half in the away match against Fulham which Palace lost 2–1.

== Personal life ==
Littlewort served as a sergeant in the Royal Fusiliers during the First World War.
