= Caesar ten Cate =

Dutch footballer (1890–1972)

Cees ten Cate
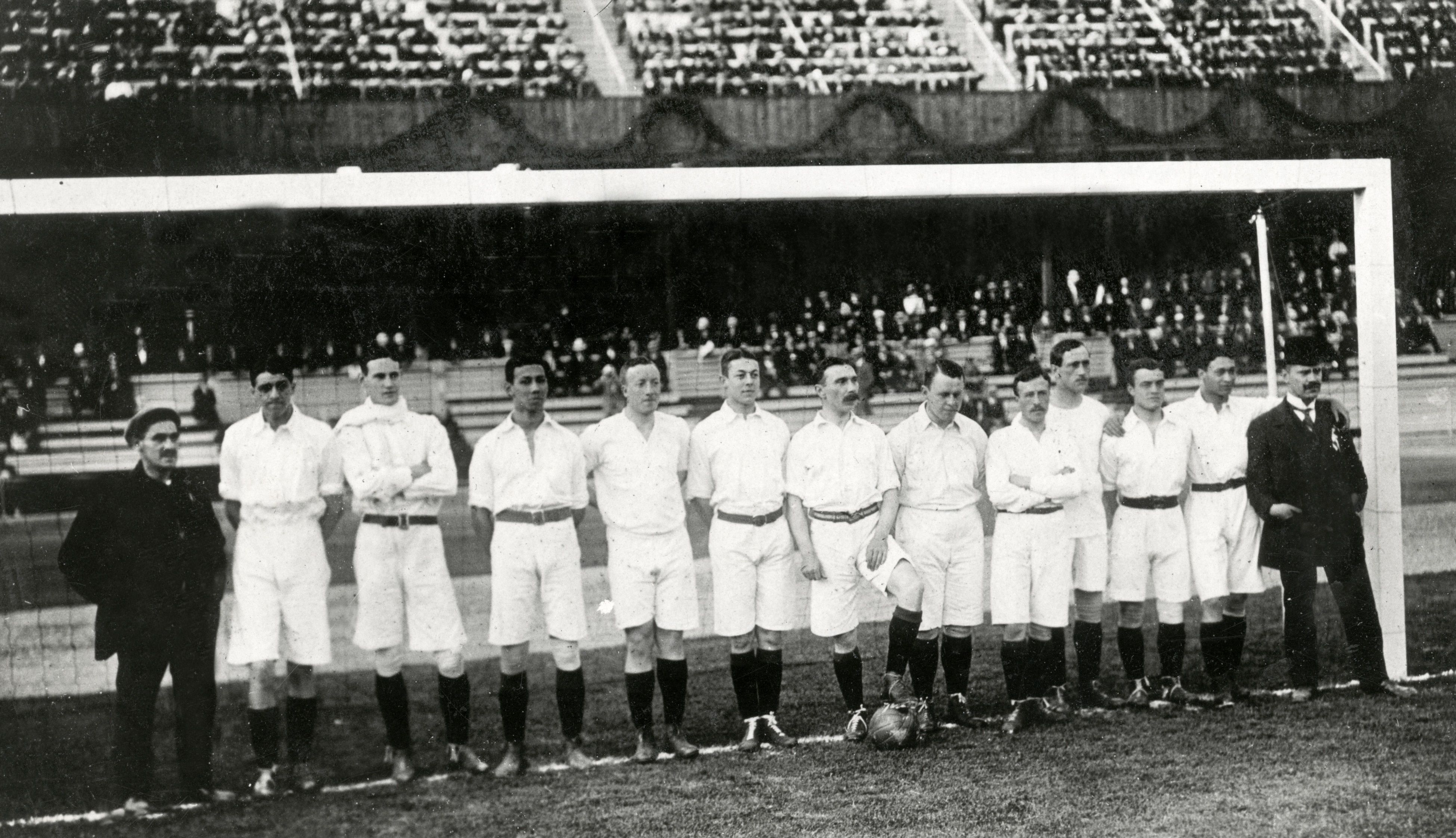
- Netherlands national team at the Olympics 1912, with trainer Edgar Chadwick (left) and Cees ten Cate (2nd from left)

Personal information
- Full name: Caesar Herman ten Cate
- Date of birth: 20 August 1890
- Place of birth: Ngawi, Dutch East Indies
- Date of death: 9 June 1972 (aged 81)
- Place of death: Amsterdam, Netherlands
- Position: Striker

Senior career*
Years	Team	Apps	(Gls)
1908–1910	Koninklijke HFC		
1910–1911	VOC		
1911–1913	Koninklijke HFC		

International career
1912	Netherlands	3	(1)
- * Club domestic league appearances and goals

Medal record

Men's Football

Representing Netherlands

Olympic Games
Bronze medal – third place	1912 Stockholm	Team competition

Caesar Herman "Cees" ten Cate (August 20, 1890, in Ngawi – June 9, 1972, in Amsterdam) was a Dutch amateur football player who competed in the 1912 Summer Olympics.

== International career ==
Ten Cate made his debut for the Netherlands in a June 1912 Olympic Games match against Sweden and earned all of his three caps at the tournament, winning a bronze medal. He was only included in the squad because first choice forwards Mannes Francken and Jan Thomee had to pull out.
