= Nico de Wolf =

Dutch footballer

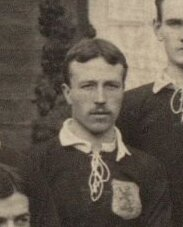
- Nico de Wolf in 1911

Medal record

Men's association football

Representing Netherlands

Olympic Games
Bronze medal – third place	1912 Stockholm	Team competition

Nicolaas de Wolf (October 27, 1887 in Apeldoorn – July 18, 1967 in Doesburg) was a Dutch amateur football (soccer) player who competed in the 1912 Summer Olympics. He was part of the Dutch team, which won the bronze medal in the football tournament.
