= Knut Lund =

Finnish footballer (1891–1974)

Personal information
- Date of birth: 17 July 1891
- Place of birth: Tuusula, Finland
- Date of death: 14 January 1974 (aged 82)
- Place of death: Helsinki, Finland

International career
Years	Team	Apps	(Gls)
- Finland

Knut Lund (17 July 1891 – 14 January 1974) was a Finnish footballer. He competed in the men's tournament at the 1912 Summer Olympics.
