= David Wijnveldt =

Dutch footballer

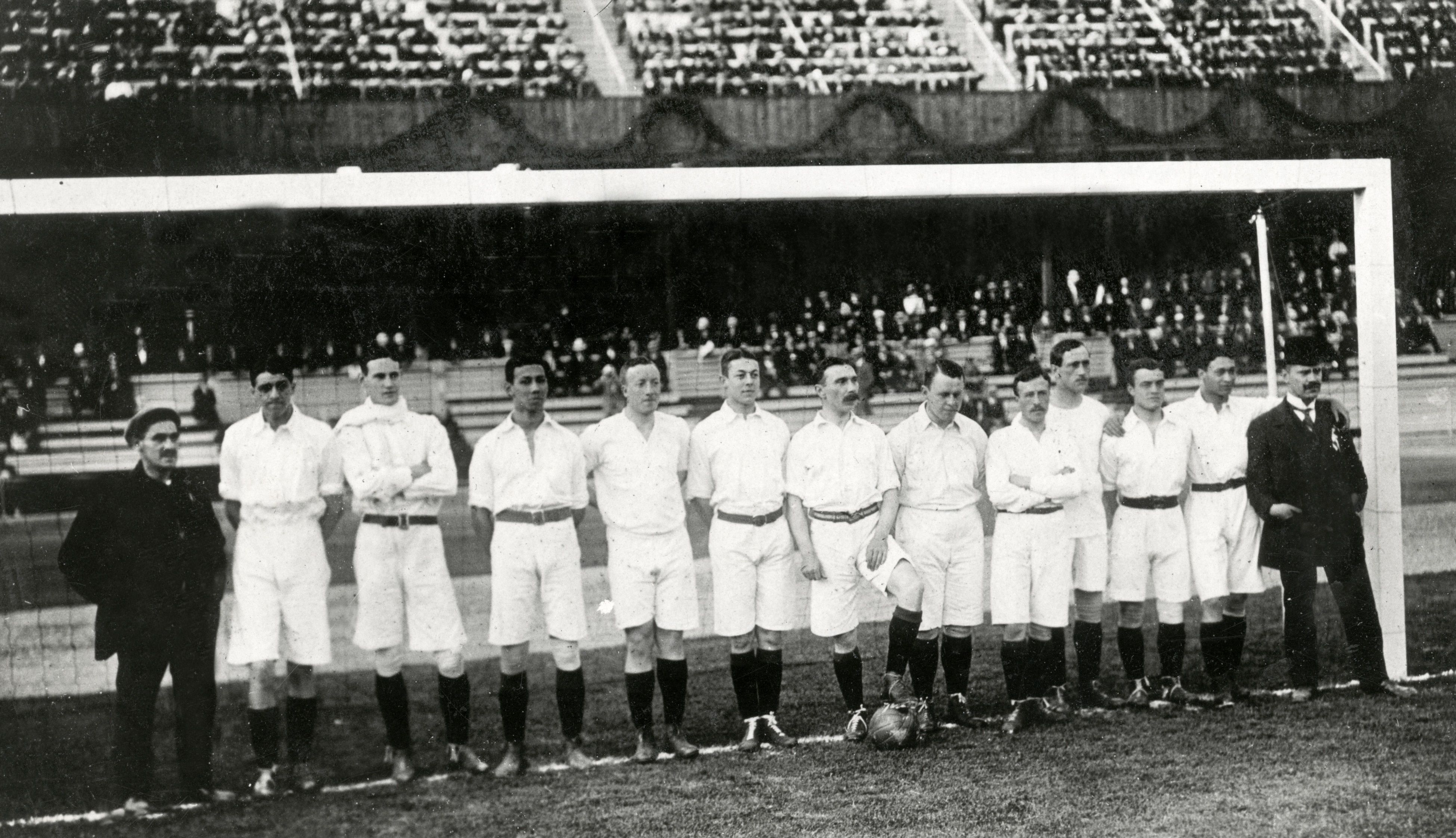
- Wijnveldt (4th from left) at the 1912 Olympics

Medal record

Men's association football

Representing Netherlands

Olympic Games
Bronze medal – third place	1912 Stockholm	Team competition

David Wijnveldt (December 15, 1891 in Jember, Java – March 28, 1962 in Zutphen) was a Dutch amateur football (soccer) player who competed in the 1912 Summer Olympics. He was part of the Dutch team, which won the bronze medal in the football tournament.
