= Adrian Birch =

English football manager (1872–1932)

Personal information
- Date of birth: 1872
- Place of birth: Middlesbrough, England
- Date of death: 27 July 1932 (aged 59–60)
- Place of death: Darlington, England

Youth career
- Middlesbrough Vulcan

Senior career*
Years	Team	Apps	(Gls)
- Middlesbrough

Managerial career
- –1905: Middlesbrough (assistant trainer)
- 1905–1913: Crystal Palace (trainer)
- 1908: Great Britain (trainer)
- 1912: Great Britain
- 1913–1932: Darlington (trainer)
Medal record
Men's football
Representing Great Britain
Men's football
Gold medal – first place	1912 Stockholm	Team competition
- * Club domestic league appearances and goals

Adrian Birch (1872 – 27 July 1932), also known as Shy Birch, was an English football trainer and manager.

== Career ==
Birch started his football career at a junior team in Middlesbrough called Vulcan, with his teammates including future English internationals Tommy Morren and Fred Priest. Afterwards, he joined Middlesbrough F.C. as a player, before becoming the assistant trainer to Charlie Harper around the turn of the 20th century, helping the club achieve promotion to the Football League First Division in the 1901–02 season. In 1905, he joined Crystal Palace, helping them win the Southern League Division Two in his first season. In 1913, he returned to the North East of England with Darlington, where he spent nearly 20 years.

In 1908, Birch was selected as a trainer for Great Britain's team at the 1908 Summer Olympics. Between 1910 and 1913, he also worked with various touring Football Association teams. Thanks to his work there, he was selected to be the manager for the Great Britain team at the 1912 Summer Olympics, where he helped them win a gold medal.

== Personal life and death ==
His nickname, 'Shy', came from his quiet nature, and known for only speaking when spoken to. Outside of football, Birch worked at a shipyard in the North East of England.

Birch died on 27 July 1932.
