= Nico Bouvy =

Dutch footballer (1892–1957)

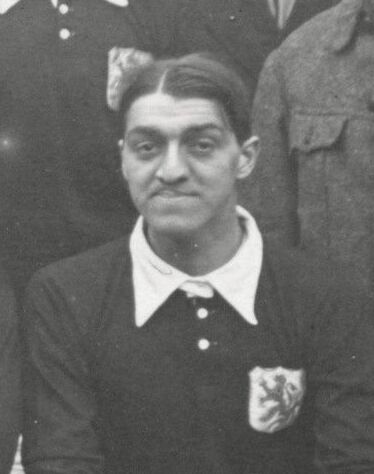
- Nico Bouvy in 1913

Personal information
- Full name: Nicolaas Jan Jerôme Bouvy
- Date of birth: 11 July 1892
- Place of birth: Banda Neira, Banda Islands
- Date of death: 14 June 1957 (aged 64)
- Place of death: The Hague, Netherlands
- Position: Striker

Senior career*
Years	Team	Apps	(Gls)
1910–1913	DFC		
1913–1914	Altona 1893		
1914–1923	HFC		

International career
1912–1913	Netherlands	9	(4)
- * Club domestic league appearances and goals

Medal record

Men's football

Representing Netherlands

Olympic Games
Bronze medal – third place	1912 Stockholm	Team competition

Nicolaas Jan Jerôme "Nico" Bouvij (11 July 1892 – 14 June 1957) was a Dutch amateur football player who competed in the 1912 Summer Olympics.

== Early life ==
Bouvy was born on 11 July 1892 in Banda Neira, Banda Islands, Dutch East Indies.

== Club career ==
He started playing football at DFC, playing alongside his three brothers. He made his senior debut in 1910, had a season in Germany with Altona 1893 Hamburg and played the remainder of his career for HFC.

In May 1924, when Victoria Hamburg played Cardiff City in a friendly (2–2), Nico Bouvy was invited to strengthen Vicky's side, which he did under a special DFB one-off licence.

Alongside Karel Lotsy, Bouvy helped to establish the annual challenge match between HFC and a team of former Dutch internationals which started in the 1920s.

== International career ==
Bouvy made his debut for the Netherlands in a March 1912 friendly match against England.

He was selected as part of the Dutch team for the 1912 Summer Olympics in Stockholm, Sweden. In the first round, Bouvy scored twice as the Netherlands defeated Sweden 4–3 after extra time. He again scored in the second round as the Netherlands defeated Austria 3–1. The Netherlands lost 4–1 to Denmark in the semi-finals but Bouvy helped them to secure bronze with a 9–0 win over Finland.

His final international was a November 1913 friendly match against England. In the course of his international career, he earned a total of nine caps and scored four goals.

== Personal life ==
Bouvy's brother Dolf Bouvy was also a successful footballer playing for HFC, Victoria Hamburg and Karlsruher FV, with whom he won the 1905 Southern German championship.

== Death ==
Bouvy died on 14 June 1957 in The Hague, Netherlands.
