= Thomas Burn =

English footballer

Olympic medal record

Men's football

Representing Great Britain
Gold medal – first place	1912 Stockholm	Team competition

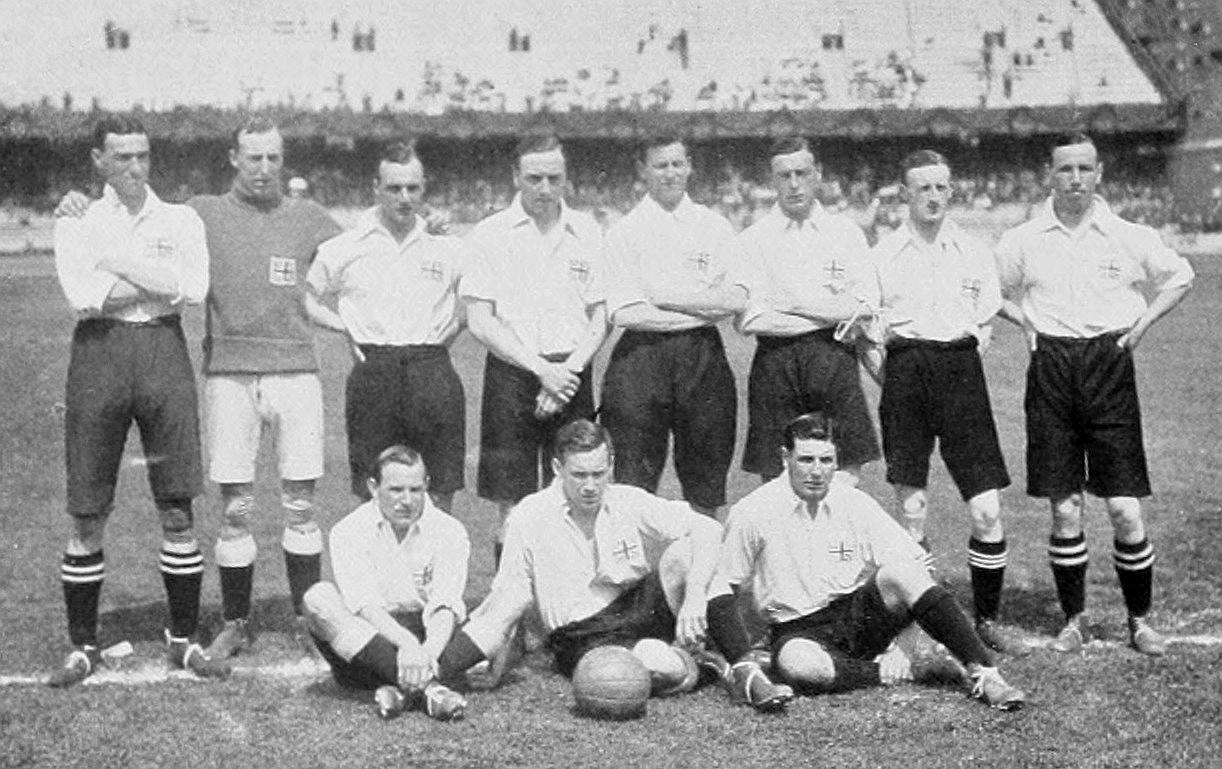
The Great Britain national football team at the 1912 Summer Olympics. Standing: Dines, Brebner, Berry, Walden, Woodward, Hoare, Sharpe, Knight. Sitting: McWirther, Burn, Littlewort.

Thomas Christopher Burn (29 November 1888 – 23 July 1976) was an England amateur footballer who played at the 1912 Summer Olympics. He was part of the Great Britain team, which won the gold medal in the football tournament. He played in all three of the games against Hungary, Finland and Denmark. He played his club football for London Caledonians F.C. He also played in the English FA XI tour of South Africa in 1920.
