= Algoth Niska =

Finnish bootlegger, footballer, and adventurer

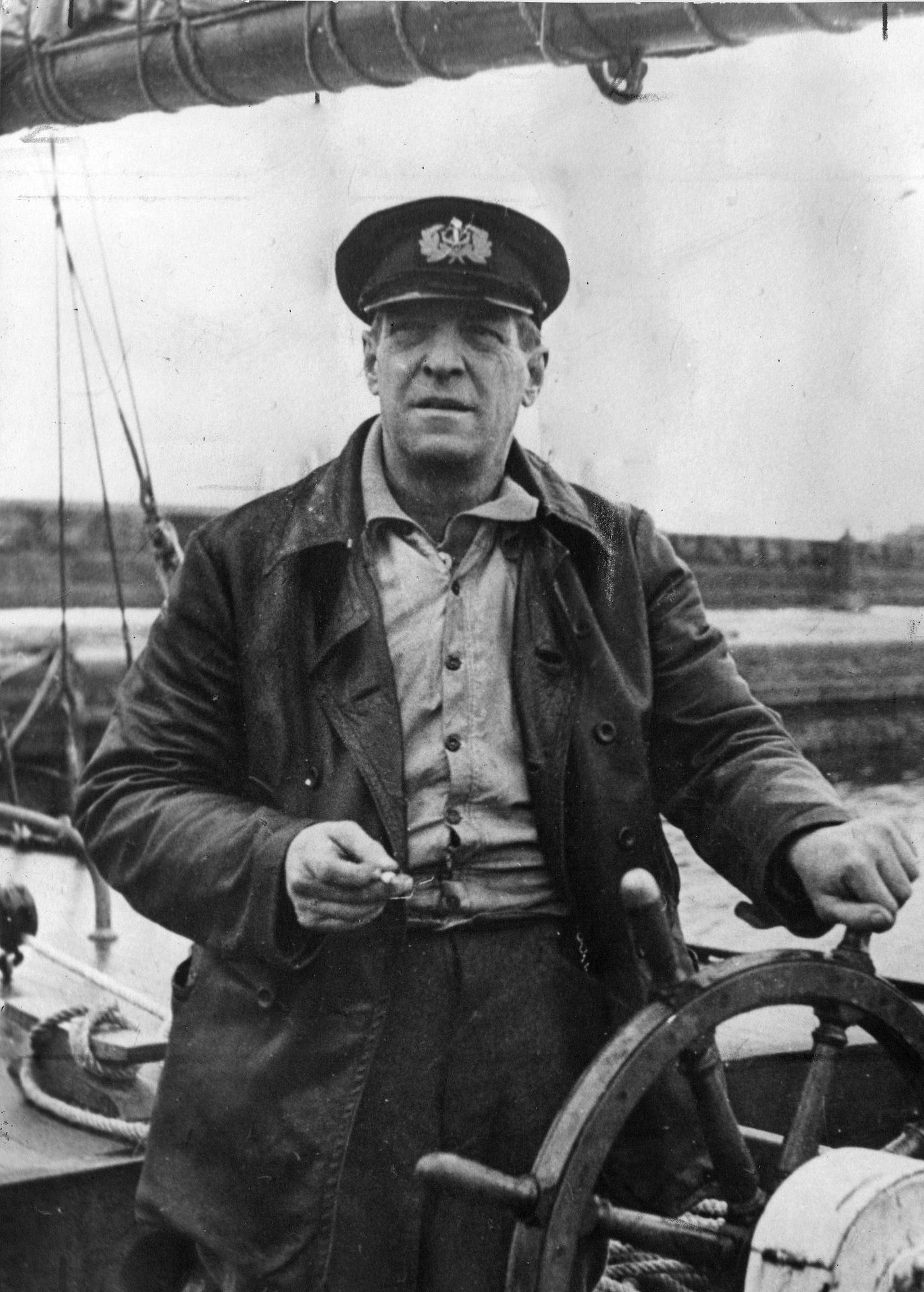
Algoth Niska

Algoth Niska (born Algoth Johannes Niska; 5 December 1888 – 28 May 1954) was a Finnish bootlegger, footballer and adventurer.

== Biography ==
Niska was born in Viipuri in 1888 and was the youngest child. His father was Ivar Alfred Niska, a captain and the director of a naval school, and his mother was Maria Elisabet Hilda Schlilter. When his father died in 1903, the family moved to Helsinki, where he got interested in football. Between 1911 and 1912, he studied at the Darmstadt University of Technology. He was a member of the Finland football team which played at the 1912 Summer Olympics in Stockholm, losing 4–0 to England in the semi-final.

Niska joined his first ship in 1908. When the First World War broke out, he went to navigation school, passing his first mate's examination in 1914, and graduated the following year, though he never got his papers. He was married twice and divorced both women; his first wife was Magda Aufrichtig and his second was Celia Andersson. He had two children. The well-known Finnish musician Ilkka Lipsanen is his grandson.

In 1919, when Finnish prohibition came into force, he acquired a large supply of now-illegal liquor. High society in Helsinki soon found out whom they could ask for refreshments. When the supply begun to run out, he bought a boat and began to smuggle liquor from Estonian and German ships who waited outside Finnish territorial waters. Later he also smuggled liquor from Sweden, where it was legal but tightly controlled.

Over the years, he used various tricks to dodge police boats – and sometimes the bullets of their machine guns – during his trips between Turku, Helsinki, Tallinn and Stockholm and in the Åland archipelago. He never shot back. In one case, he unloaded his cargo right in the heart of Helsinki while people were distracted during the visit of Gustav V of Sweden. At one stage, he was sentenced to a year in prison for resisting police, although he claimed to be innocent of this charge.

Niska was eventually wanted both in Sweden and Finland. He was sentenced for short periods in both countries. In prison, he became a model prisoner and was often released early for good behavior.

In 1932, Niska was exiled from Sweden and he spent time in Riga, Tallinn and Danzig. He spoke at least Finnish, Swedish, German and English. While in Danzig, he worked as a ship trade official, and his other occupations during his life included first mate, sea captain, businessman, and owner of a brokerage business.

In 1938, prior to World War II, Niska began to smuggle something else – Jewish refugees from Germany to the relative neutrality of Finland. His own estimate was 151 Jews. He used stolen and forged passports and various devious plots to get Jews from Germany through the Netherlands and Estonia. Reportedly he sometimes refused payment. When his network was exposed in 1939, he fled to Estonia and found that the Soviet Union had occupied the country. According to his own story, he fled back to Finland in a rowing boat.

Niska fought in Laatokka during the Winter War. There is no clear knowledge of what he did during the Continuation War.

In the mid-1940s, Niska tried to finance the building of a new boat by giving interviews about his life – he needed the money and knew he could afford to ask. In 1951, Niska went through surgery in Antwerp but did not pay the bill – he was in serious debt in that time. In 1953, he was diagnosed with a brain tumor and lost his speech and power of movement. He died on 28 May 1954.

== Publications ==
He wrote two books, Yli vihreän rajan (Over the green border) and Mina äventyr (My adventures). Niska's books are:

- Niska, Algoth (1931). Mina äventyr (in Swedish). Helsinki: Söderström & Co.
- Niska, Algoth (1931). Seikkailujani (in Finnish). Lahti: Kanervan kustannusliike.
- Niska, Algoth (1953). Över gröna gränser (in Swedish). Helsinki: Söderström & Co.
- Niska, Algoth (1953). Yli vihreän rajan (in Finnish). Turku: Mantere.

One biography is available, Kari Kallonen's Algoth Niska - Salakuljettajien kuningas (Algoth Niska - King of Smugglers) Revontuli 2000.
