= Venues of the 1952 Summer Olympics =

For the 1952 Summer Olympics, a total of twenty-four sports venues were used. Three of the venues were constructed for the 1940 Summer Olympics, but were postponed in the wake of World War II. Those venues were completed in time for the 1952 Games. The main stadium served as host to the World Athletics Championships in 1983 and in 2005. Two venues were purchased by the city of Helsinki after the Olympics, one changed from an exhibition center to a sports arena, and another changed from a sports arena to an art museum. With an annual average temperature of 5.9 °C, Helsinki is the coldest city to host the Summer Olympics.

== Venues ==
Venue	Sports	Capacity	Ref.
Arto Tolsa Areena (Kotka)	Football	11,400	
Hämeenlinna	Modern pentathlon	2,983	
Harmaja	Sailing	Not listed.	
Helsinki Football Grounds	Football	18,050.	
Huopalahti	Shooting (shotgun)	2,000	
Käpylä	Cycling (road)	4,050	
Laakso	Equestrian (eventing - riding)	4,854	
Lahden kisapuisto	Football	8,067	
Liuskasaari	Sailing	19,000	
Malmi shooting range	Shooting (pistol/ rifle)	2,000	
Maunula	Cycling (road)	21,708	
Meilahti	Rowing	3,554	
Messuhalli	Basketball (final), Boxing, Gymnastics, Weightlifting, Wrestling	5,500	
Olympic Stadium	Athletics, Equestrian (jumping), Football (final)	70,470	
Pakila	Cycling (road)	Not listed.	
Ruskeasuo Equestrian Hall	Equestrian (dressage, eventing)	3,780	
Swimming Stadium	Diving, Swimming, Water polo	11,345	
Taivallahti	Canoeing	Not listed.	
Tali Race Track	Equestrian (eventing - steeplechase)	20,000	
Tampere	Football	20,700	
Tennis Palace	Basketball	1,518	
Veritas Stadion (Turku)	Football	14,224	
Velodrome	Cycling (track), Field hockey	7,235	
Westend Tennis Hall	Fencing	951	

== Before the Olympics ==
The idea for the construction of the Olympic Stadium began in 1927 though construction itself would take place between 1934 and 1938. This was done in preparation for the 1940 Summer Olympics that were moved from Tokyo after the breakout of World War II. Construction for the Swimming Stadium began in 1939, but was interrupted due to World War II. The building was resumed in 1947 and completed the following year. A concrete velodrome was built in 1940 though it was not completed until 1946 due to the war. Messuhalli was completed in 1935.

The Tennis Palace was constructed in time for the 1940 Games as well.

== During the Olympics ==
The modern pentathlon events were held in one venue for the first time at the Summer Olympics since 1920.

== After the Olympics ==
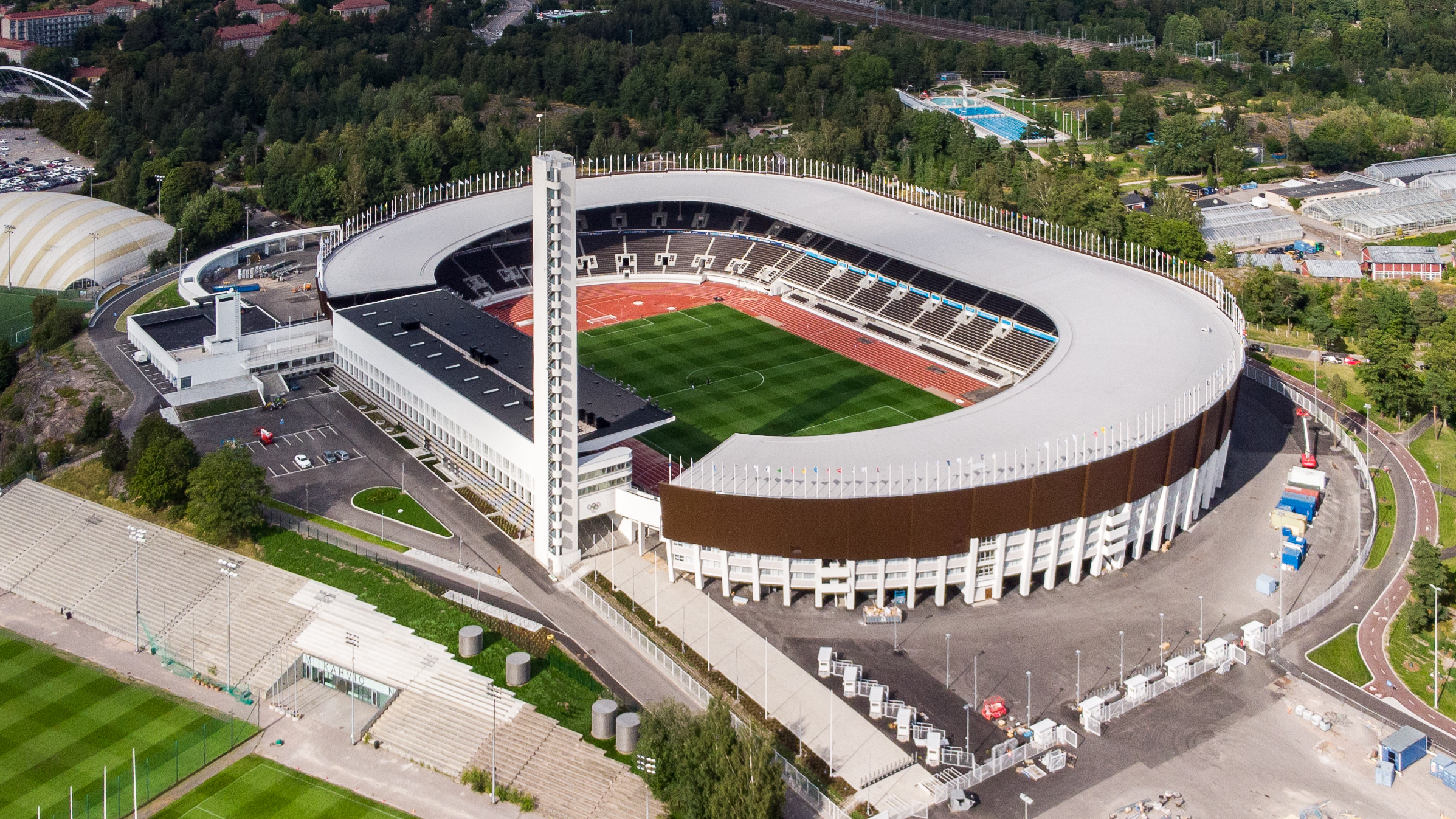
Olympic stadium

In 1983, the Olympic Stadium hosted the first IAAF World Championships in Athletics. Between 1990 and 1994, the stadium underwent a renovation. The stadium became the first venue to host the IAAF World Championships in Athletics twice when it hosted again in 2005.

The aquatics venue is open to the public annually between May and September. Töölö Sports Hall was purchased by the city of Helsinki in 1975 and converted from exhibition center into a sports arena. The Tennis Palace was renovated, purchased by the city of Helsinki in 1957, and converted into an art museum in 1993.

Finnair Stadium, which was named Sonera Stadium since August 2010, was constructed on the Helsinki Football Grounds for HJK in 2000.
