= Bror Wiberg =

Finnish footballer (1890-1935)

Personal information
- Date of birth: 14 June 1890
- Place of birth: Turku, Grand Duchy of Finland, Russian Empire
- Date of death: 18 June 1935 (aged 45)
- Place of death: Helsinki, Finland

International career
| Years | Team | Apps | (Gls) |
- Finland

Bror Wiberg (14 June 1890 – 18 June 1935) was a Finnish footballer. He competed in the men's tournament at the 1912 Summer Olympics. He played in Russia.
