= Otto Noll =

Austrian footballer (1882–1922)

Personal information
- Date of birth: 24 July 1882
- Place of birth: Prague, Austria-Hungary
- Date of death: 1922 (aged 39–40)

International career
Years	Team	Apps	(Gls)
- Austria

Otto Noll (24 July 1882 – 1922) was an Austrian footballer. He competed in the men's tournament at the 1912 Summer Olympics. On club level, Noll played for Prague's ethnic German club DFC Prag.
