= Club Deportivo Universidad Católica =

Chilean football club

Universidad Católica
- Full name: Club Deportivo Universidad Católica
- Nicknames: Los Cruzados; La «UC» La Franja
- Founded: 21 April 1937; 89 years ago
- Ground: Claro Arena
- Capacity: 20,249
- Chairman: Matías Claro
- Manager: Daniel Garnero
- League: Liga de Primera
- 2025: Liga de Primera, 2nd of 16
- Website: www.cruzados.cl
Home colours	Away colours	Third colours

Club Deportivo Universidad Católica, known as Universidad Católica, is a professional football club based in Santiago, Chile. Founded in 1937 they play in the Primera División, the top flight of Chilean football. The team has played its home games at Claro Arena since 1988.

Universidad Católica has won the third most league championships at a national level. In domestic football, the club has won 28 trophies; a record 16 Primera División de Chile titles, 2 Segunda División de Chile, 4 Copa Chile, 4 Supercopa de Chile, a Copa Apertura, a Copa República. In international competitions, Universidad Católica have won 1 trophies; Copa Interamericana (1994).

In 1993, Universidad Católica was the runner-up in the most important international tournament in South America: the Copa Libertadores de América, losing in the finals against the defending Libertadores' Champion São Paulo. Universidad Católica has reached the semi-finals in the Copa Libertadores four times (years 1962, 1966, 1969 and 1984).

The club's most successful player is José Pedro Fuenzalida with eleven titles, and the player with most appearances is Mario Lepe with 639 games. Its traditional rival is Universidad de Chile, they contest the Clásico Universitario.

== History ==
=== Founding and beginnings in professional football ===
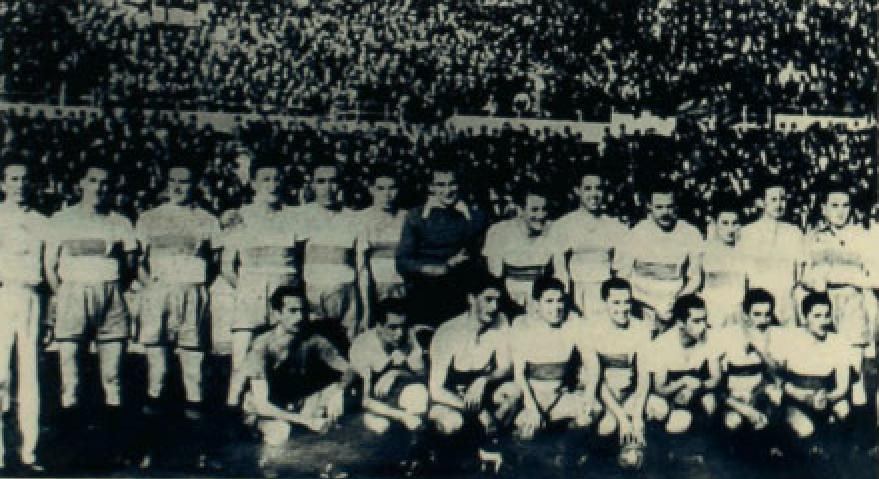
Team of Universidad Católica in 1939

While the club was born as one of the many sport branches of the Universidad Católica de Chile, officially founded in 1937, it began, strictly speaking, around 1910, when students of the university would reunite to play football matches, frequently facing historical rival Universidad de Chile. In time, the idea of creating a professional club emerged, and on 21 April 1937, the club officially and legally began. It made its professional debut, in the second division, against the Universidad de Chile. Universidad Católica won its first League title in the 1949 season.

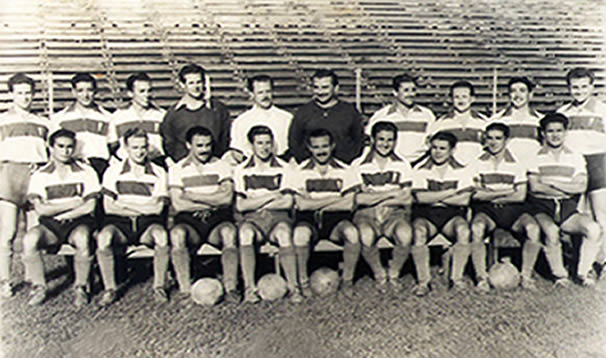
Universidad Católica in 1949

In December 1956, Universidad Católica was placed at the bottom of the league table and relegated to Segunda División for the first time in its history. On 10 November 1956, Universidad Católica won the Segunda División title after defeating Deportes La Serena by 3–2 and gained promotion straight back up to the top division, with captain Sergio Livingstone and Raimundo Infante claiming the top scorer award. In the 1970s, Universidad Católica was facing an institutional, the team ended the 1973 Primera División tournament at the bottom of the table, Universidad Católica was relegated to Segunda División for the second time in its history. In 1975, Universidad Católica won the title and therefore returned to Primera División to play the 1976 season.

In 1993, Universidad Católica reached their first ever Copa Libertadores final. The team had previously eliminated clubs Atlético Nacional (2–0, 1–2 in round of 16), Barcelona (3–1, 1–1 in quarterfinals) and América de Cali (1–0, 2–2 in semifinals). In the finals, between the two legs after a heavy defeat away la Catolica won the second leg but lost São Paulo the title on aggregate 5–3. With Manuel Pellegrini as manager, on 1 November 1994, after beating Saprissa 5–1 at San Carlos de Apoquindo with goals by Andrés Romero, Alberto Acosta, Juvenal Olmos, Miguel Ardiman and Rodrigo Barrera, Universidad Católica became the second Chilean team to win a Copa Interamericana, they also achieved the 1995 Copa Chile title.

In 1997 the club celebrated its 60th anniversary with a friendly tournament where they beat Ajax Amsterdam 3–2 in the Copa 60º Aniversario de Universidad Católica.

=== In the 21st century ===
Universidad Católica won the title 2002 Primera División (Apertura) after beating Rangers de Talca 4–0 in final at San Carlos de Apoquindo, with Juvenal Olmos as manager. In 2005 the club has been reemerged in international competition, advancing to the 2005 Copa Sudamericana semifinal before being knocked out by the powerful Boca Juniors from Argentina, who would go on to win the tournament. On 22 December, Universidad Católica won their nine Chilean Primera División (Clausura) title, after beating Universidad de Chile's in a penalty shootout at Estadio Nacional. In 2006 the team made a good presentation in the Copa Libertadores, but was eliminated at the last minute by Tigres UANL of Mexico and failed to advance beyond the group stage.

Católica again played 2008 Copa Libertadores with no luck, being eliminated in the group stage by goal difference by River Plate and América. In 2010 Copa Libertadores, their performance was no better, finishing third in group stage behind Universidad de Chile and Flamengo. In the 2010 season a 3–2 defeat to Colo Colo in October gave Colo Colo a seven-point lead in the league with seven match of the season remaining. A victory over Cobreloa 3–2 at Estadio Municipal de Calama, put them one point away from their first title since 2005. In the last match, Universidad Católica defeated Everton 5–0 to secure the club's ten Chilean Primera Division title and end a five-year trophy drought.

In the 2011 season they finished in second place in Chilean Primera División. They also reached the 2011 Copa Chile final where they faced Deportes Magallanes. Universidad Católica won 4–2 in a penalty shoot-out after the match finished 1–1. In 2011 Copa Libertadores, Católica finished first on the group stage, and then advanced to the quarter-finals, knocking out Grêmio of Brazil on the best 16 round, and falling to Peñarol of Uruguay 2–0 in Montevideo and winning their home match 2–1, which was not enough to advance. In 2012 the club again played Copa Libertadores, under coach and former player Mario Lepe, finished last on the group stage, winning only 1 home game and losing on their away games in Colombia and Bolivia. In Copa Sudamericana 2012, Universidad Católica advancing to the semifinal before being knocked out by the powerful São Paulo from Brazil, who would go on to win the tournament.

On 30 April 2016, Universidad Católica won the Primera Division Clausura title in 2016 for the first time in six years. Universidad Católica won the title on the last matchday after beating Audax Italiano 2–1. On 15 September 2016, the club won the Supercopa de Chile for a first time defeating Universidad de Chile 2–1 in the final. After, Universidad Católica won the Primera Division Apertura, the title was won on 8 December, where Universidad Católica faced Deportes Temuco at Germán Becker. Two goals in the last half-hour secured Universidad Católica a 2–0, with Mario Salas leading the team towards its first Bicampeonato for winning two national titles in a row.

=== Four consecutive Chilean Primera División ===
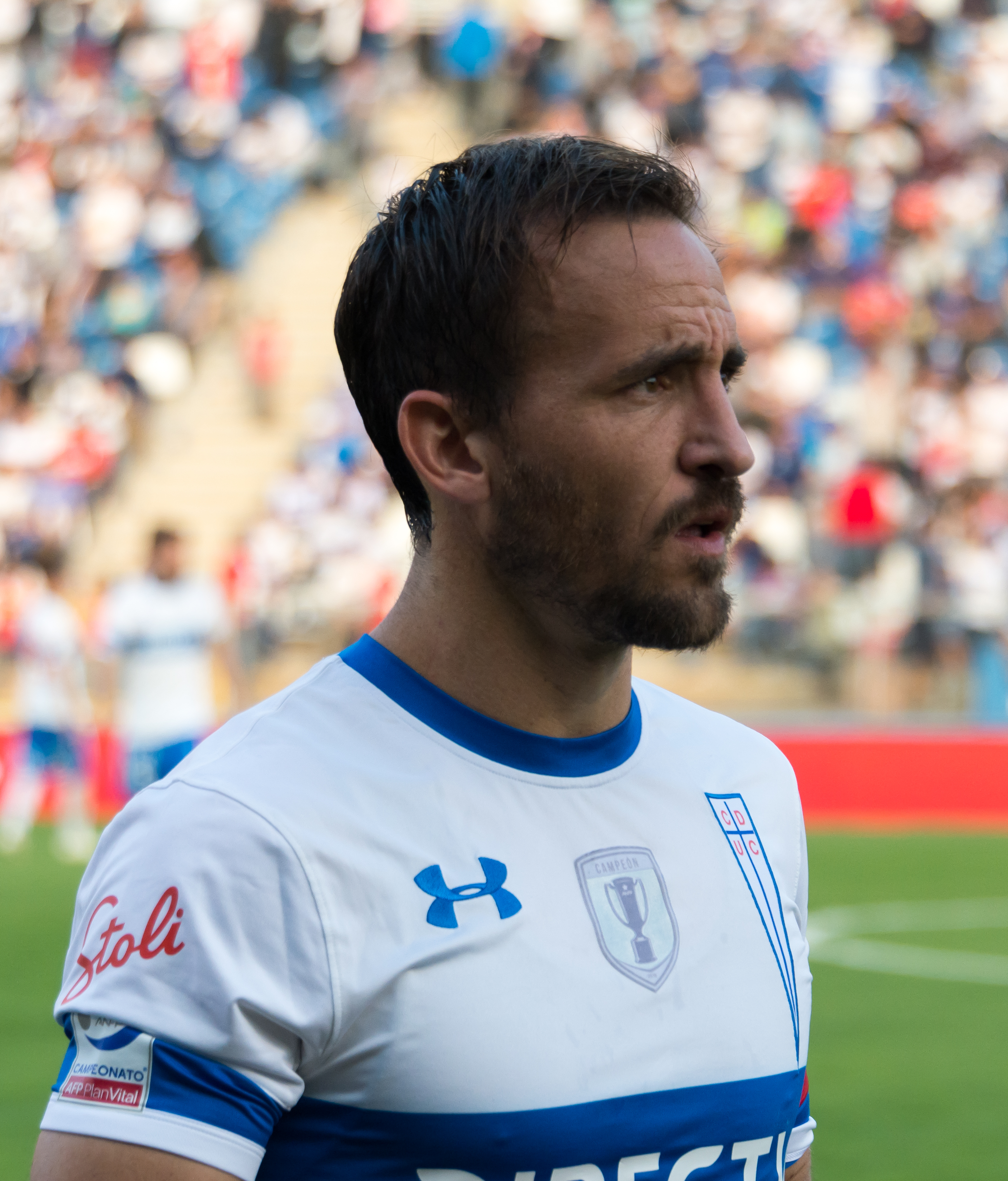
José Pedro Fuenzalida is the most decorated player in Universidad Católica history.

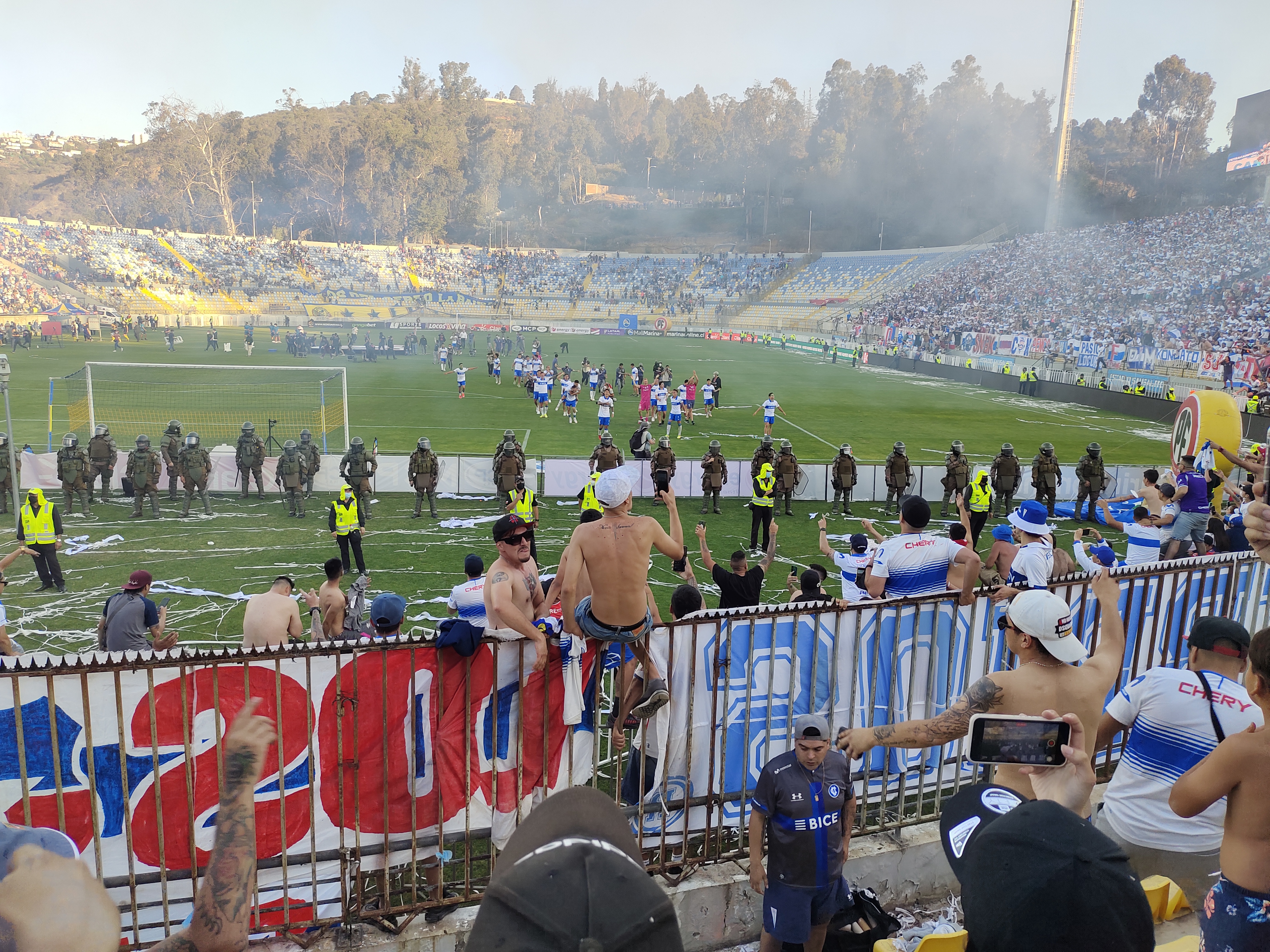
Celebrations of players and fans of Universidad Católica after winning the 2018–2021 four-time championship.

With Beñat San José as manager, Universidad Católica won the title 2018 on the last matchday after beating Deportes Temuco 2–1. In 2019, with Gustavo Quinteros Universidad Católica won their 2nd Supercopa de Chile and won a second consecutive Primera División title. Due to the 2019 Chilean protests, the competition was suspended since mid-October with six matchdays still left. On 29 November 2019, ANFP's Council of Presidents voted to conclude the season. The title was the 14th official league in the club's history. In the 2010s, Universidad Católica won five league championships, a Copa Chile and two Chilean Supercups.

On 14 February 2020, with Ariel Holan Universidad Católica secured their third consecutive Primera División title, they also achieved the semi-finals of Copa Chile. Days after winning the title, Holan announced his resignation as Universidad Católica and in March, Gustavo Poyet was appointed coach, signing a two-year contract, and Universidad Católica won their 3rd Supercopa de Chile. In 2021 Copa Libertadores, Católica finished second on the group stage, and then advanced to the round of 16, before being knocked out by the Palmeiras from Brazil, who would go on to win the tournament. On 30 August 2021, Gustavo Poyet was sacked from his managerial position, one day after Cristian Paulucci was announced as the new coach. On 20 January 2021, Universidad Católica won their four Supercopa de Chile title, after beating Ñublense's in a penalty shootout. On 4 December 2021, Universidad Católica were confirmed 2021 Primera División champions, reaching four consecutive league titles.

== Crests and colours ==
Its official fight song is the Hymn of the Club Deportivo Universidad Católica, based on the song Tramp! Tramp! Tramp!.

=== Crests ===
The first crest had a design consisting of an interlacing of two initials of the club, "UC", in dark blue on a white shirt.

=== Sponsorship ===
The following table details the chronology of the clothing brands and sponsors of Universidad Católica.

Period	Supplier	Sponsor
1976–1978	In-House	Financiera Cash
1978–1980	Haddad	
1981	New Leader	
1981–1982	Adidas	AFP San Cristóbal
1982–1985	Adidas	
1986–1989	Adidas	Pan Am
1989	Puma	Pan Am
1990–1991	Puma	Ladeco
1992–1995	Diadora	Samsung
1996	Lotto	Samsung
1997	Lotto	Parmalat
1998–1999	Reebok	Parmalat
2000–2001	Reebok	BankBoston
2002	Nike	BankBoston
2003–2008	Nike	Cristal
2008–2011	Puma	Cristal
2012–2014	Puma	DirecTV
2015–2017	Umbro	DirecTV
2018	Under Armour	DirecTV
2020–2023	Under Armour	BICE
2024–Present	Puma	BICE

== Grounds ==
Estadio San Carlos de Apoquindo
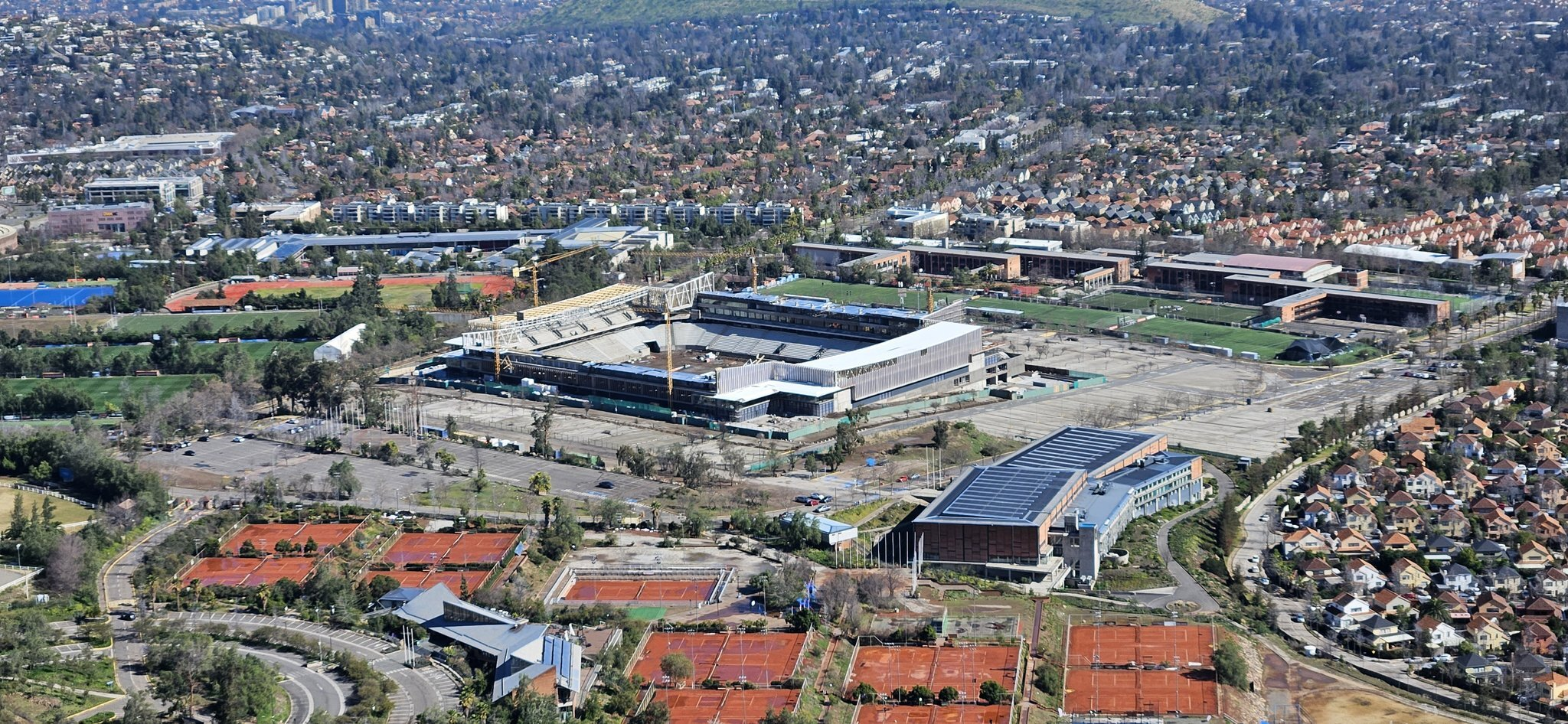
- The stadium during the 2024 renovation and part of the San Carlos de Apoquindo sports complex.
- Capacity: 20,249
- Field size: 106 m × 72 m (348 ft × 236 ft)

Construction
- Opened: 4 September 1988
- Architect: Esteban Barbieri

Universidad Católica has owned four stadiums: Estadio Universidad Católica, located in the Maestranza and Marcoleta sector; Campos de Sports de Ñuñoa, which already had an extensive history in Chilean sports; Estadio Independencia, located in the homonymous commune of Santiago and inaugurated on 12 October 1945; and San Carlos de Apoquindo.

After moving between grounds, the team moved to the Independencia Stadium in 1945, which remained its home ground for 26 years and which was demolished because of the financial problems of the club, and started to play at Unión Española Stadium, the Santa Laura. After that, Universidad Católica moved its home matches to San Carlos de Apoquindo, which was inaugurated on 4 September 1988 with a match against River Plate.

Universidad Católica has won various trophies while playing home games at the San Carlos de Apoquindo, including the Chilean Primera División in 2002 (Apertura tournament), 2010, 2016 (Clausura tournament), 2019 (Season where the team received the trophy at home without playing the last games due to the social outbreak of that year) and 2020.

In 1994, Católica faced Saprissa of Costa Rica in the final of the 1993 Copa Interamericana at the stadium, winning with an aggregate score of 6-4 (3–1 in favor of each team in the home and away games, and 2–0 in extra time of the tiebreaking game).

== Records and statistics ==
Mario Lepe holds the record for most Universidad Católica appearances, having played 639 first-team matches (76 matches for Copa Libertadores de América) from 1982 to 2000. Andrés Romero comes second with 484 appearances. José María Buljubasich is Universidad Católica's all-least beaten goalkeeper, with 1352 minutes (4th on IFFHS ranking).

Universidad Católica's all-time highest goalscorer in official competitions is Rodrigo Barrera with 118 goals, surpassing Raimundo Infante's 113 goals in 2002. Four other players have also scored over 100 goals for Universidad Católica: Alberto Fouillioux (1957–1975), Néstor Isella (1963–1970), Osvaldo Hurtado (1980-1988t) and the previous goalscoring record-holder Raimundo Infante (1941–1956). Infante being Universidad Católica's top goalscorer of all time in La Liga history with 103 goals.

The IFFHS ranked the team in 8th place in 2012. The club has reached notoriety, both in a national and South American level, as the owner of one of the best infrastructures and training centers in the continent. Its most recent youth academy produced player known worldwide is Gary Medel, currently playing for Italian side Bologna FC, among other clubs such as Boca Juniors, Sevilla and Internazionale, as well as playing a big role in Chile's 2010 and 2014 World Cup squads.

Officially, the highest attendance figure for a Universidad Católica match is 77,890, which was for a Primera División match at Estadio Nacional on 11 January 1967. Universad Católica has also set records in Chilean football, most notably the most seasons won in a row (four, during 2018–2021).

== Support and rivalries ==
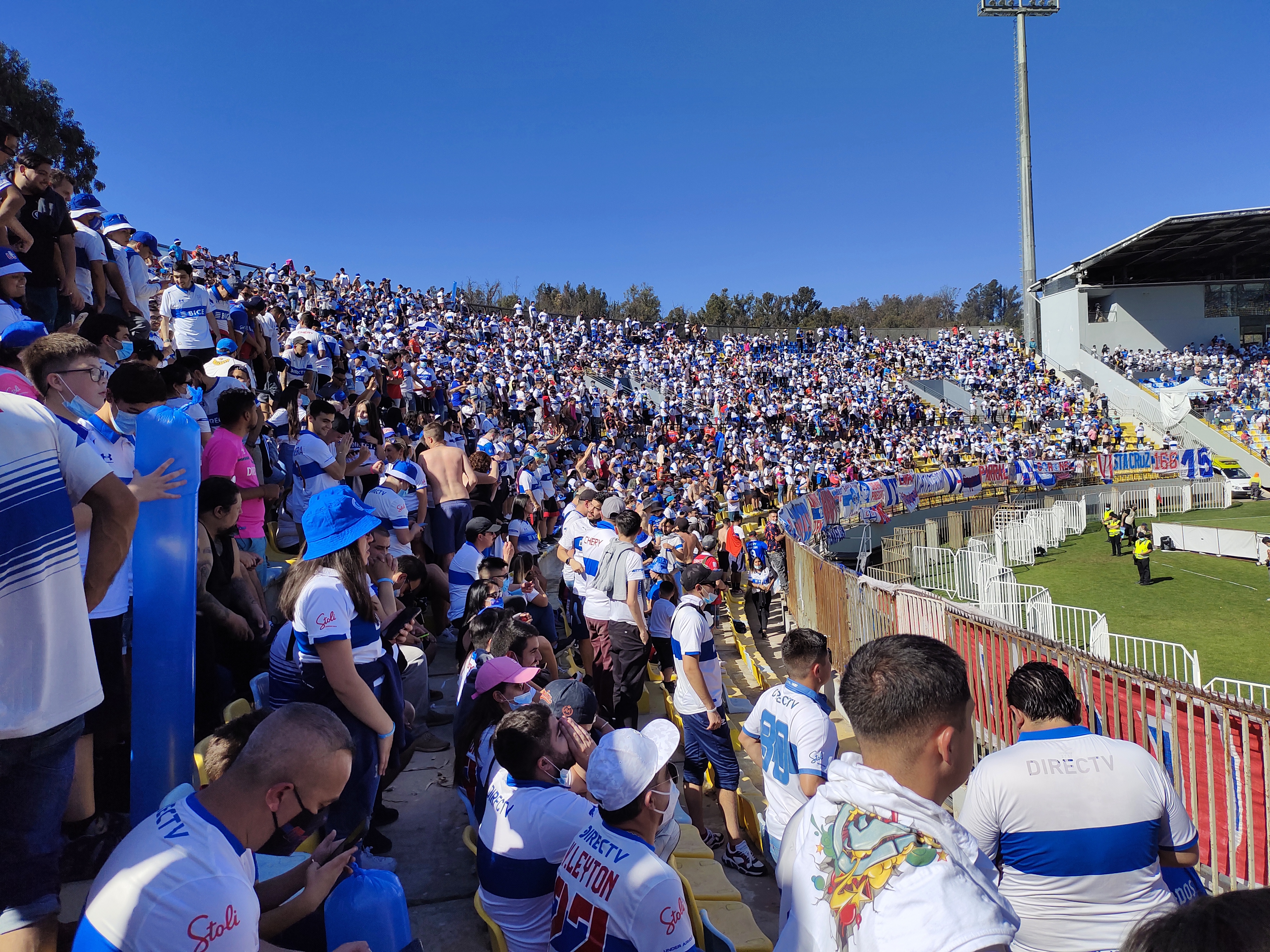
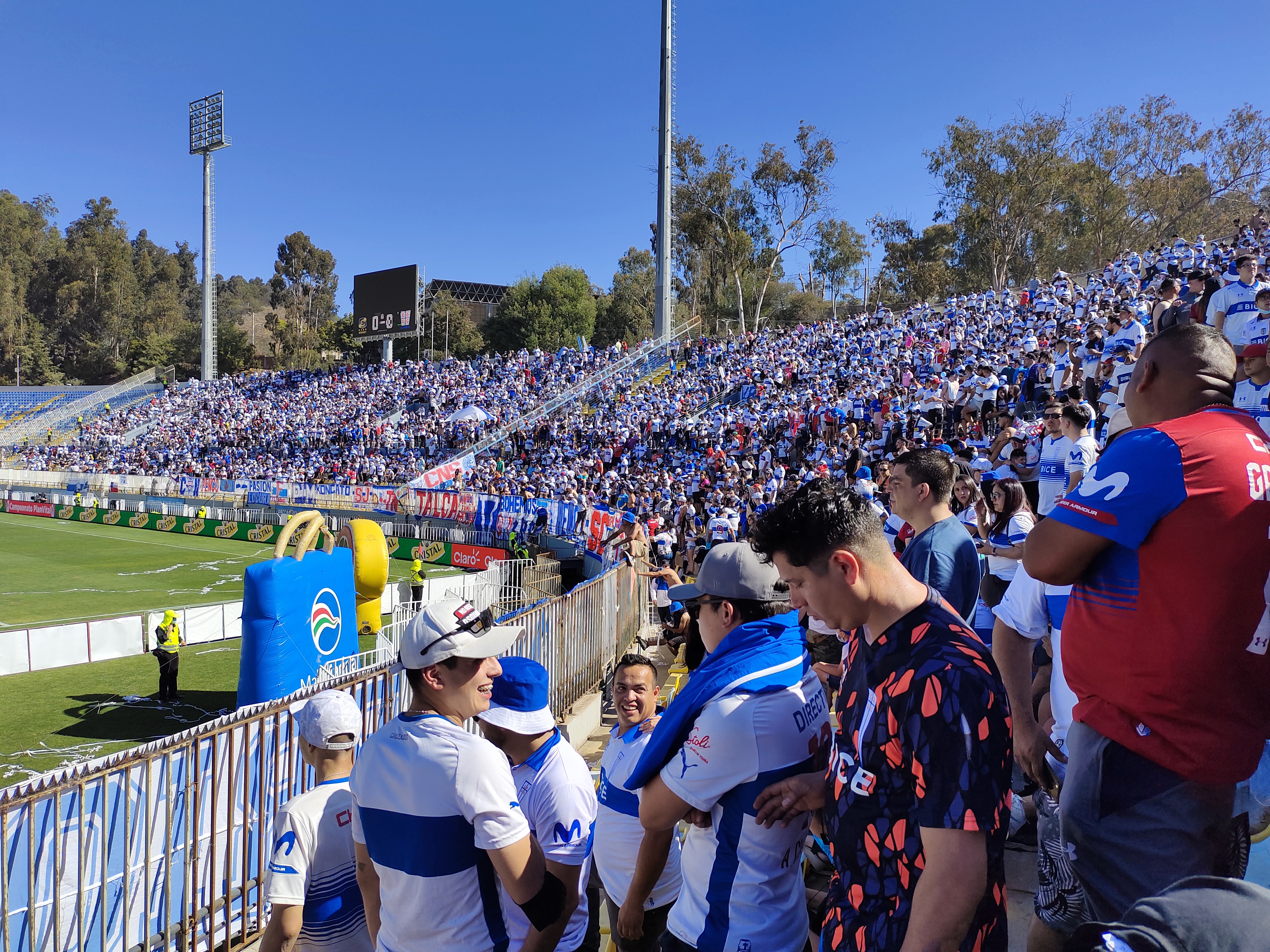
A part of the Universidad Católica fans who met on December 4, 2021 at the Sausalito Stadium in Viña del Mar. That day the team won its fourth consecutive national title (a total of sixteen to that date).

Universidad Católica is the third club with the largest following in Chile, with approximately 13% of the total Chilean football fans according to research published in 2006 by Fundación Futuro, according by Spanish newspaper agency Marca in 2012 have approximately 9% and according by Adimark in 2018, have a 7% of the total Chilean football fans.

=== Clásico Universitario ===
There is often a rivalry between the two clubs from academic roots, where the game between Universidad Católica and Universidad de Chile is known as "Clásico Universitario". It is the oldest confrontation between two clubs from academic roots, as the first confrontation goes back to the University Classic of 1909. Rivalry, both in sports and in academic issues, made these matches between the universities become more and more important, eventually reaching the national status of "Universities' Derby".

This clásico has been recognized by FIFA as the most traditional of Chile. They met for the first time on 13 June 1937 in matchday three of the first Serie B at the Estadio Militar. These two teams have played twenty championship definitions against each other, Universidad Católica has won fourteen and Universidad de Chile six.

== Honours ==
Club Deportivo Universidad Católica honours
Type	Competition	Titles	Seasons
National	Primera División	16	1949, 1954, 1961, 1966, 1984, 1987, 1997-A, 2002-A, 2005-C, 2010, 2016-C, 2016-A, 2018, 2019, 2020, 2021.
National	Segunda División	2	1956, 1975.
National	Copa Chile	4	1983, 1991, 1995, 2011.
National	Supercopa de Chile	4	2016, 2019, 2020, 2021.
National	Copa República	1	1983.
International	Copa Interamericana	1	1993.

== Players ==
The Chilean Football Federation rules allow a maximum of seven foreign players per team, but only five can be on the pitch at any one time. Currently, Católica has six foreign players.

=== First-team squad ===
Current squad of Club Deportivo Universidad Católica as of 14 August 2026 (edit)
Sources: Universidad Católica official website

No.		Position	Player
1	CHI	GK	Vicente Bernedo
2	CHI	DF	Daniel González
3	CHI	DF	Eugenio Mena
4	CHI	DF	Ignacio Pérez
5	ARG	MF	Agustín Farías
6	CHI	DF	Sebastián Arancibia
7	ARG	MF	Justo Giani
8	ARG	MF	Fernando Zuqui
9	CHI	FW	Fernando Zampedri (captain)
10	ARG	MF	Matías Palavecino
11	CHI	FW	Clemente Montes
12	CHI	GK	Francisco Valdés
13	CHI	MF	Alfred Canales
14	CHI	MF	Jimmy Martínez
15	CHI	DF	Cristián Cuevas

No.		Position	Player
17	CHI	MF	Gary Medel
18	CHI	FW	Juan Rossel
19	CHI	DF	Branco Ampuero
20	COL	MF	Jhojan Valencia
21	ARG	DF	Agustín García Basso
22	ARG	MF	Martín Gómez (loan from Real Pilar)
23	CHI	DF	Tomás Asta-Buruaga
24	CHI	GK	Martín Contreras
25	CHI	MF	Diego Corral
26	ARG	DF	Juan Ignacio Díaz
27	CHI	GK	Darío Melo
28	CHI	DF	Bernardo Cerezo
30	CHI	FW	Diego Valencia
39	CHI	DF	Nicolás L’Huillier
41	CHI	DF	Jeffrey Sekgota

Manager: Daniel Garnero

=== Youth Academy ===
Note: Flags indicate national team as defined under FIFA eligibility rules; some limited exceptions apply. Players may hold more than one non-FIFA nationality.

No.	Pos.	Nation	Player
12	GK	CHI	Francisco Valdés
22	MF	ARG	Martín Gómez (loan from Real Pilar)
34	DF	CHI	Francisco Daza
37	FW	CHI	Joaquín Meneses
38	FW	COL	Nicolás Girón
42	DF	USA	Nickolas Pino
43	FW	CHI	Amaro Pérez
44	DF	CHI	José Salas
47	MF	CHI	Mathías Contreras
48	DF	CHI	Diego Bermúdez
49	FW	CHI	Vasco León

No.	Pos.	Nation	Player
50	DF	CHI	Mathias Langenbach
51	FW	CHI	Matías Moreno
52	MF	CHI	Lucas Barraza
—	GK	CHI	Cristóbal del Río
—	GK	CHI	Matías Meza
—	DF	CHI	Vicente Olivares
—	DF	CHI	Raimundo Vega
—	FW	CHI	Bayron Lizama
—	FW	CHI	Amaro Riveros
—	FW	CHI	Danilo Saavedra

=== Out on loan ===
Note: Flags indicate national team as defined under FIFA eligibility rules; some limited exceptions apply. Players may hold more than one non-FIFA nationality.

No.	Pos.	Nation	Player
—	DF	CHI	Camilo Matamala (at Provincial Ovalle)
—	DF	CHI	Guillermo Soto (at Tigre)
—	MF	CHI	Vicente Cárcamo (at Deportes Limache)
—	MF	CHI	Bryan González (at Unión San Felipe)
—	MF	CHI	Nicolás Letelier (at Trasandino)
—	MF	CHI	Joan Orellana (at Deportes La Serena)

No.	Pos.	Nation	Player
—	MF	CHI	Jorge Ortiz (at Deportes Copiapó)
—	MF	VEN	Leenhan Romero (at Deportes Concepción)
—	FW	CHI	Axel Cerda (at Concón National)
—	FW	CHI	Bastián Gómez (at Deportes Linares)
—	FW	CHI	Martín Hiriart (at Unión La Calera)
—	FW	CHI	Milan Tudor (at San Marcos)

=== 2026 Winter transfers ===
==== In ====
Note: Flags indicate national team as defined under FIFA eligibility rules; some limited exceptions apply. Players may hold more than one non-FIFA nationality.

No. / Pos. / Nation / Player; — / DF / ARG / Agustín García Basso (from Racing Club)	No. / Pos. / Nation / Player; — / FW / CHI / Danilo Saavedra (from Colo-Colo)

==== Out ====
Note: Flags indicate national team as defined under FIFA eligibility rules; some limited exceptions apply. Players may hold more than one non-FIFA nationality.

No. / Pos. / Nation / Player; 36 / MF / CHI / Bryan González (loan to Unión San Felipe)	No. / Pos. / Nation / Player; 46 / MF / CHI / Vicente Cárcamo (loan to Deportes Limache)

=== Club captains ===
Since the establishment of the club in 1937, 19 players have been club captain of Universidad Católica.

Name	Period
(Chile) Nelson Sanhueza	?
(Chile) Ignacio Prieto	1977-1979
(Chile) Santiago Oñate	1980
(Chile) Juan Ubilla	1981
(Chile) Miguel Ángel Neira	1983-1987
(Chile) Osvaldo Hurtado	1988
(Chile) Pablo Yoma	1989
(Chile) Marco Cornez	1990
(Chile) Patricio Toledo	1991-1992
(Chile) Mario Lepe	1993-2000
(Chile) Miguel Ramírez	2001-2003

Name	Period
(Chile) Nelson Parraguez	2004
(Chile) Cristián Álvarez	2004-2005
(Chile) Eduardo Rubio	2005-2006
(Chile) Francisco Arrué	2006
(Argentina) José María Buljubasich	2007-2008
(Chile) Milovan Mirošević	2009-2014
(Chile) Cristián Álvarez	2015-2018
(Chile) José Pedro Fuenzalida	2019-2022
(Argentina) Matías Dituro	2023
(Chile) Fernando Zampedri	2023-

== Personnel ==
=== Current technical staff ===
Position	Name
Manager	(Brazil) Tiago Nunes
Assistant Manager	(Brazil) Evandro Fornari
Assistant Manager	(Chile) Rodrigo Valenzuela
Academy team Manager	(Chile) Andrés Romero
Fitness coach	(Brazil) Edy Carlos
Analyst	(Brazil) Jussan Anjolin
Assistant fitness coach	(Chile) Mauricio González
Goalkeeping coach	(Chile) Robert Prieto
Director of Football	(Argentina) José María Buljubasich

- Last updated: 14 April 2024

=== Management ===
Position	Staff
President	Juan Tagle Quiroz
1st Vice-president	Guillermo Agüero Piwonka
2nd Vice-president	Hernán de Solminihac
Members	Alex Harasic Durán; Sebastián Arispe Karlezi; Felipe Correa Rivera; Martín del Río Arteaga; Juan Pablo del Río Goudie; Jaime Estévez Valencia; Martín Cuthbert de Solminihac; Luis Larraín Arroyo

- Last updated: 26 December 2021

== Other sports sections ==
- Universidad Católica (sports club)

== See also ==
- Universidad Católica de Chile
