= Eino Soinio =

Finnish footballer (1894-1973)

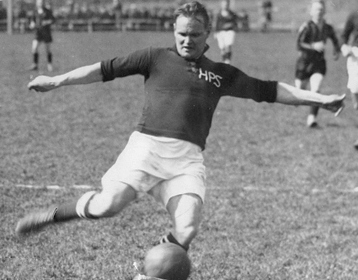

Personal information
- Date of birth: 12 November 1894
- Place of birth: Helsingfors, Grand Duchy of Finland, Russian Empire
- Date of death: 7 December 1973 (aged 79)
- Place of death: Helsinki, Finland

Senior career*
Years	Team	Apps	(Gls)
- HJK Helsinki

International career
- Finland
- * Club domestic league appearances and goals

Eino Alex Soinio (né Salin, 12 November 1894 – 7 December 1973) was a Finnish association football player. Together with his elder brother Kaarlo he was part of the Finnish team that placed fourth in the 1912 Summer Olympics. He played all four matches and scored one goal. In total, he played 40 times for Finland between 1912 and 1927.
