= Raimundo Tupper =

Chilean footballer (1969-1995)

Personal information
- Full name: Raimundo Tupper Lyon
- Date of birth: 7 January 1969
- Place of birth: Santiago, Chile
- Date of death: 20 July 1995 (aged 26)
- Place of death: San José, Costa Rica
- Position: Left back

Youth career
- 1980–1985: Universidad Católica

Senior career*
Years	Team	Apps	(Gls)
1985–1995	Universidad Católica	193	(26)

International career
1987	Chile U20		
1993–1994	Chile	7	(1)
- * Club domestic league appearances and goals

Raimundo Tupper Lyon (7 January 1969 – 20 July 1995) was a Chilean professional football player, best known for his years with Universidad Católica. He was a left back.

== Club career ==
Born into a family of five children (four males and one female). He studied at the St. Ignatius El Bosque, and joined the lower divisions of Universidad Católica in 1980, his first coach being former national team player Alberto Fouillioux.

He made his debut with the first team in 1985 against with Cobresal in the city of El Salvador. In 1987, he won the national title with Universidad Católica.

In 1989 Tupper joined Diego Portales University to study Engineering, which he did not finish. That year he won the Liguilla Pre-Libertadores (Chile) against Cobreloa, which enabled Católica to play in the Copa Libertadores.

Between 1989 and 1995 Mumo was a UC player, reaching with them the Copa Libertadores final in 1993, which they lost against Brazilian giants São Paulo. Previously he won the 1991 Copa Chile. He was also champion of the 1993 Copa Interamericana, held in 1994.

== International career ==
In 1987, he was called up to the Chilean under-20 national team, which won fourth place in the 1987 U-20 World Cup held in Chile, in which he played with his great friend and teammate Lukas Tudor.

== Death ==
Tupper suffered from clinical depression, which led him to commit suicide by jumping off a balcony in the ninth floor of Hotel Centro Colón in San José, Costa Rica on 20 July 1995 in San José, Costa Rica, being only 26 years old. Católica was supposed to play a friendly match against Deportivo Saprissa, but the game was subsequently suspended.

Currently, a white cross was built in the mountains surrounding San Carlos de Apoquindo in memory of "Mumo". Subsequently, his brother Andrés Tupper, became the General Director of Universidad Católica.

== Personal life ==
He was nicknamed Mumo, a hypocoristic of Raimundo.

His cousin, Rodrigo Tupper, was the priest who officiated his funeral mass and he is well-known in Chile for having left the priesthood to get married.

The former Venezuela international footballer Javier González Tupper, is the son of a Raimundo's female cousin and played for Ñublense in Chile.
