= Mario Lepe =

Chilean footballer (born 1965)

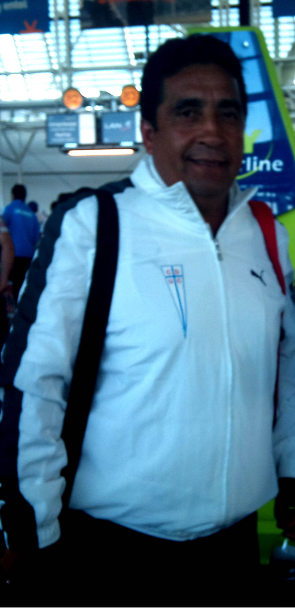

Personal information
- Full name: Mario Enrique Lepe González
- Date of birth: 25 March 1965 (age 61)
- Place of birth: Santiago, Chile
- Position: Midfielder

Youth career
- 1980–1984: Universidad Católica

Senior career*
Years	Team	Apps	(Gls)
1984–2000	Universidad Católica		

International career
1985–1993	Chile	24	(1)

Managerial career
- 2008: Universidad Católica (interim)
- 2011–2012: Universidad Católica
- 2013–2014: Naval
- * Club domestic league appearances and goals

Mario Enrique Lepe González (born 25 March 1965) is a Chilean retired football player and coach who played as a midfielder. He spent his entire career with Universidad Católica. He also represented the Chilean national side.

== Coaching career ==
On 19 April 2012, Lepe was fired as coach after Universidad Católica failed to advance to the next stage of the Copa Libertadores.

In addition to professional football, Lepe has been in charge of football academies in both La Florida and San Joaquín affiliated to Universidad Católica, just like another former players such as René Valenzuela, Carlos Verdugo, Luciano Saavedra, Ian Mac-Niven, among others.

== See also ==
- List of one-club men
