= Luka Tudor =

Chilean footballer (born 1969)

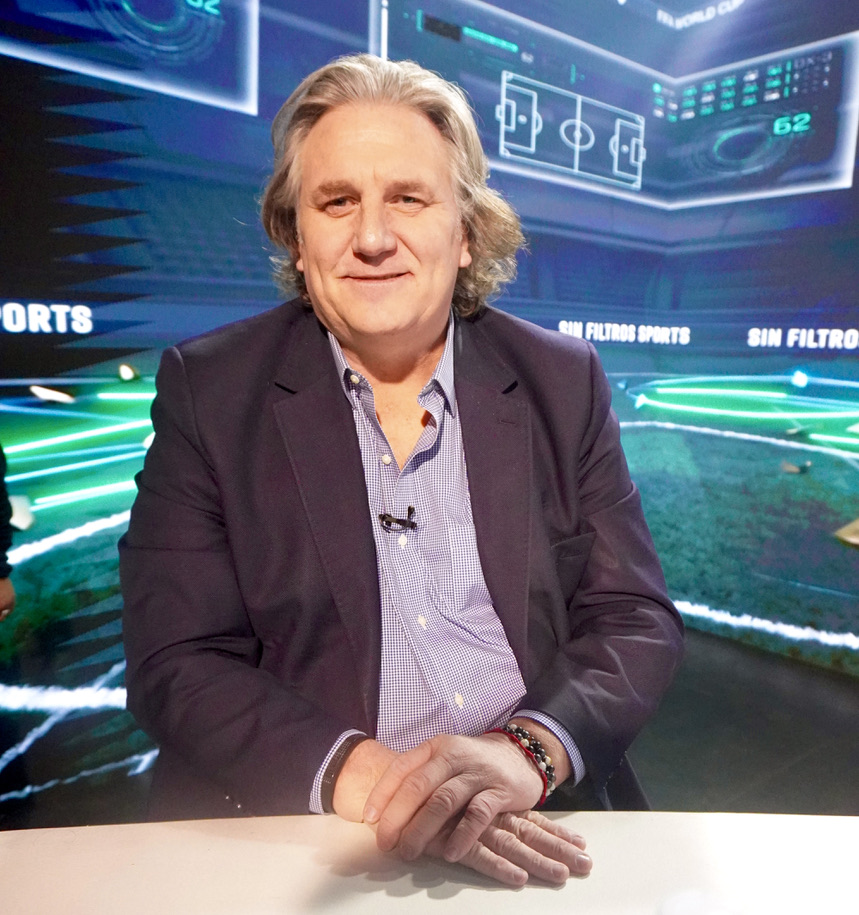

Personal information
- Full name: Luka Nicola Tudor Bakulić
- Date of birth: 21 February 1969 (age 57)
- Place of birth: Santiago de Chile, Chile
- Height: 1.78 m (5 ft 10 in)
- Position: Forward

Youth career
- Universidad Católica

Senior career*
Years	Team	Apps	(Gls)
1987–1989	Universidad Católica	60	(23)
1990–1991	FC Sion	21	(6)
1991–1992	Newell's Old Boys	8	(2)
1992–1993	Sabadell	7	(0)
1993–1996	Universidad Católica	73	(45)
1997	Colo-Colo	12	(0)
Total		181	(75)

International career
1987	Chile U20	5	(3)
1988–1995	Chile	12	(2)
- * Club domestic league appearances and goals

Luka Nicola Tudor Bakulić (born Lukas Nicolás Tudor Bakulić; 21 February 1969) is a Chilean former professional footballer who played as a forward.

As a footballer, Tudor played primarily as a forward and spent most of his career with Universidad Católica, where he had two spells and scored 64 goals in 133 league appearances. He also played abroad for FC Sion in Switzerland and Newell's Old Boys in Argentina, as well as for Colo-Colo in Chile. In 1993, he set a Chilean football record by scoring seven goals in a single league match, during Universidad Católica's 8–3 win over Deportes Antofagasta.

Following his retirement from professional football, Tudor developed a career in television and radio as a sports commentator and presenter. He has worked for Chilean media outlets including Chilevisión, CDF, Mega, Fox Sports and Radio ADN. He also worked as a sports agent through his company Tudorsports. In 2019, he served as a jury member at the Viña del Mar International Song Festival.

== Football career ==
Tudor began playing football as a child at the Estadio Yugoslavo (now Estadio Croata), before joining the youth system of Universidad Católica in 1983. In 1985, he participated in two tournaments in Europe, the Hanze Toernooi in the Netherlands and the Croix tournament in France. He also played in the "Deventer 86" youth tournament in the Netherlands, where the Chilean team finished the tournament undefeated and won the title. Tudor was the tournament's top scorer, with five goals in six matches.

For his performances as a forward for Universidad Católica, he received the 1986 Breakthrough Player Award from Triunfo magazine.

After his first years as a professional in Chile, he moved to Switzerland to play for FC Sion, and later had a brief spell with Newell's Old Boys. At the Rosario-based club, which was managed by Marcelo Bielsa, he made 11 appearances and scored two goals. One of them came in a 5–0 win over River Plate at the Estadio Monumental on 10 May 1992. Despite his short period at the club, he was part of the team that won the 1992 Clausura and appeared in three matches in the 1992 Copa Libertadores. Newell's reached the final of the competition, where they lost to São Paulo in a penalty shoot-out.

Tudor subsequently returned to Universidad Católica. On 21 November 1993, he set a Chilean record for the most goals scored by a player in a single match, scoring seven times in an 8–3 victory over Deportes Antofagasta at San Carlos de Apoquindo. He also won the 1994 Copa Interamericana, Universidad Católica's first international title. Across his two spells with the club, Tudor scored 64 goals in 133 official Chilean Primera División matches.

In 1997, manager Fernando Carvallo left Tudor out of his plans, after which he joined Colo-Colo. He made 19 appearances during the season without scoring and was part of the team that won the 1997 Clausura. After experiencing recurring injury problems, he retired from professional football at the end of the year.

== Media career ==
In 2000, two years after his retirement, Tudor began working in television on the Chilevisión programme Bohemia, where he served as a co-host alongside Cristián Velasco.

He later worked as a sports agent through his company Tudorsports and also represented the Pro Evolution Soccer video game series in Chile.

After working for CDF, Mega and Fox Sports, Tudor began working in 2017 as a commentator on ADN Deportes on Radio ADN and on ESPN Radio Chile. He also served as a jury member at the 2019 Viña del Mar International Song Festival.

In June 2022, Tudor resigned from ADN Deportes after a WhatsApp audio recording was made public in which he exchanged information with an unidentified person, stating that Francis Cagigao would appear on the programme Los Tenores to confront his colleague Juan Cristóbal Guarello. Following the broadcast, Guarello stated that he had not been informed of the circumstances under which Cagigao would appear on the programme and therefore had not been able to prepare a response to the statements made by the Spanish football executive.

In 2026, Tudor joined Sin filtros Sports as a panellist. The programme was an adaptation of Sin filtros focused on analysis of the 2026 FIFA World Cup.

== Honours ==
FC Sion

- Swiss Cup: 1990–91

Newell's Old Boys

- Argentine Primera División: 1992 Clausura

Universidad Católica

- Copa Chile: 1995
- Copa Interamericana: 1993

Colo-Colo

- Chilean Primera División: 1997 Clausura

Chile

- Copa del Pacífico: 1988
