= Denmark national football team results (1908–1929) =

This is a list of the Denmark national football team results from 1908 to 1929.

The Denmark national team was officially created in 1908, however, the first appearance of a Danish national team was at the 1896 Summer Olympics in Athens, where a Denmark XI beat a Greece XI, either 9–0 or 15–0, at the Neo Phaliron Velodrome in a demonstration game. Denmark also participated in the 1906 Intercalated Games also in Athens, with a team compiled of players from the Copenhagen Football Association (KBU), and they won the event after again beating Greece with a heavy score (9–0), and thereby winning an unofficial gold medal.

Between their first official match in 1908 and 1929, Denmark played 73 games. Throughout this period they played in three Olympic football tournaments in 1908, 1912 and 1920, reaching the final on the former two, which they lost to Great Britain on both occasions. In the 1908 semi-finals they beat France 17-1 with 10 goals from Sophus Nielsen.

They also played the inaugural edition of the Nordic Football Championship in 1924-28, winning the tournament.

== 1900s ==
=== 1908 Olympic Games ===
19 October 1908 1908 Summer Olympics first round	Denmark	9 – 0	France B	London, England
15:00	N. Middelboe 10', 49'; Wolfhagen 15', 17', 67', 72'; Bohr 25', 47'; S. Nielsen 78'	Report1; Report2		Stadium: White City Stadium; Attendance: 2,000; Referee: Thomas Kyle (Great Britain)
Note: First official match (also first away match); first goal for Denmark (by Nils Middelboe); first win (also first away win).

22 October 1908 1908 Summer Olympics Semi-finals	Denmark	17 – 1	France	London, England
15:00	S.Nielsen 3', 4', 6', 39', 46', 48', 52', 64', 66', 76'; Lindgren 18', 37'; Wolfhagen 60', 72', 82', 89'; N.Middelboe 68'	Report1; Report2	Sartorius 16'	Stadium: White City Stadium; Attendance: 1,000; Referee: Thomas Campbell (Great Britain)
Note: Biggest victory of the Denmark football team.

24 October 1908 1908 Summer Olympics Final	England Amateurs; Great Britain	2 – 0	Denmark	London, England
15:00	Chapman 20'; Woodward 46'	Report		Stadium: White City; Attendance: 8,000; Referee: John Lewis (Great Britain)
Note: First defeat

== 1910s ==
=== 1910 ===
5 May 1910 Friendly	Denmark	2 – 1	England Amateurs	København, Denmark
13:30 (UTC+1)	Lindgren 10'; Wolfhagen 75'	Report	Steer 55'	Stadium: Kjøbenhavns Boldklub's ground Attendance: 7,000; Referee: Jacky Pearson (England)

Denmark became the first team in 4 years to beat England Amateurs's, which didn't go well for the English, so a second match was scheduled for 7 May, however, King Edward VII died on 6 May and the officials asked for a postponement for 9 May, but after heavy rain over Copenhagen, the English referee, Jackie Pearson, called the match off, thus killing the chances for revenge.

7/9 May 1910 Friendly	Denmark	Cancelled	England Amateurs	København, Denmark
		Report		Stadium: Kjøbenhavns Boldklub's ground Referee: Jackie Pearson (England)

=== 1911 ===
21 October 1911 Friendly	England Amateurs	3 – 0	Denmark	London, England
15:00 (UTC+0)	Hoare 43', 85'; Webb 50'	Report		Stadium: Park Royal Stadium; Attendance: 2,900; Referee: Christiaan Groothoff (Netherlands)

=== 1912 ===
30 June 1912 Summer Olympics quarter-finals	Denmark	7–0	Norway	Stockholm, Sweden
16:30 (UTC+1)	Olsen 4', 70', 88'; S. Nielsen 60', 85'; Wolfhagen 25'; Middelboe 37'	Report1; Report 2		Stadium: Tranebergs Idrottsplats; Attendance: 700; Referee: Ruben Gelbord (Sweden)
Note: First match against Norway

2 July 1912 Summer Olympics Semi-finals	Denmark	4–1	Netherlands	Stockholm, Sweden
19:00 (UTC+1)	Olsen 14', 87'; Jørgensen 7'; P. Nielsen 37'	Report	H. Hansen 85' (o.g.)	Stadium: Olympic Stadium; Attendance: 6,000; Referee: Ede Herczog (Hungary)
Note: First match against the Netherlands

4 July 1912 Summer Olympics Final	England Amateurs; Great Britain	4 – 2	Denmark	Stockholm, Sweden
19:00 (UTC+1)	Hoare 22', 41'; Walden 10'; Berry 43'	Report	Olsen 27', 81'	Stadium: Olympic Stadium; Attendance: 25,000; Referee: Christiaan Groothoff (Netherlands)

6 October Friendly	Denmark	3–1	Germany	Copenhagen, Denmark
14:00 (UTC+1)	Middelboe 22', 67'; Olsen 55'	Report	Jäger 85' (pen.)	Stadium: Idrætspark; Attendance: 10,000; Referee: Herbert Willing (Netherlands)
Note: First match against Germany

=== 1913 ===
25 May Friendly	Denmark	8 – 0	Sweden	Copenhagen, Denmark
13:30 (UTC+1)	Gyldenstein 17', 56', 61'; Olsen 20', 44'; Wolfhagen 39'; Nielsen 53'; Middelboe 57'	Report		Stadium: Idrætsparken; Attendance: 8,000; Referee: Albert Meerum-Terwogt (Netherlands)
Note: First match against Sweden

5 October Friendly	Sweden	0 – 10	Denmark	Stockholm, Sweden
13:30 (UTC+1)		Report	Nielsen 5', 10', 29', 47', 50', 53'; Wolfhagen 63', 85'; Knudsen 40', 70'	Stadium: Stockholm Olympic Stadium; Attendance: 10,000; Referee: George Miller (England)

26 October Friendly	Germany	1–4	Denmark	Stadion Hoheluft, Germany
15:00 (UTC+1)	Jäger 44'	Report	Nielsen 5', 7', 42', 87'	Stadium: Hamburg; Attendance: 15,000; Referee: Herbert Willing (Netherlands)

=== 1914 ===
17 May Friendly	Denmark	4–3	Netherlands	Copenhagen, Denmark
13:30 (UTC+1)	Buitenweg 11', 34' de Groot 33'	Report	P. Nielsen 20', 63', 69'; S. Nielsen 68'	Stadium: Københavns Idrætspark; Attendance: 13,000; Referee: Jack Howcroft (England)

5 June Friendly	Denmark	3 – 0	England Amateurs	Copenhagen, Denmark
15:00 (UTC+1)	Knudsen 20'; S. Nielsen 43'; P. Nielsen 71'	Report		Stadium: Idrætsparken; Attendance: 18,500; Referee: Herbert Willing (Netherlands)
Note: Final match before the outbreak of the First World War.

=== 1915 ===
6 June Friendly	Denmark	2 – 0	Sweden	Copenhagen, Denmark
13:30 (UTC+1)	Olsen 47'; Nielsen 62'	Report		Stadium: Idrætspark; Attendance: 11,000; Referee: Herman Tromp (Netherlands)

19 September Friendly	Denmark	8–1	Norway	Copenhagen, Denmark
13:30 (UTC+1)	Nielsen 23', 37', 71'; Olsen 28', 65', 77'; Rohde 53'; Castella 80' (pen.)	Report	H. Ditlev-Simonsen 20'	Stadium: Københavns Idrætspark; Attendance: 5,000; Referee: Erik Alstam (Sweden)

31 October Friendly	Sweden	0 – 2	Denmark	Stockholm, Sweden
13:30 (UTC+1:00)		Report	Nielsen 4'; Rohde 30'	Stadium: Stockholm Olympic Stadium; Attendance: 15,000; Referee: Albert Meerum Terwogt (Netherlands)

=== 1916 ===
4 June Friendly	Denmark	2 – 0	Sweden	Copenhagen, Denmark
13:30 (UTC+2:00)	Nielsen 19', 48'	Report		Stadium: Idrætspark; Attendance: 20,000; Referee: Herman Tromp (Netherlands)

25 June Friendly	Norway	0 – 2	Denmark	Kristiania, Norway
13:00 (UTC+2)		Report	Rohde 75', 82'	Stadium: Frogner stadion Attendance: 12,000; Referee: Erik Alstam (Sweden)

8 October Friendly	Sweden	4 – 0	Denmark	Stockholm, Sweden
14:00 (UTC+1:00)	Karlstrand 3'; Gustafsson 28'; Swensson 49'; Bergström 75'	Report		Stadium: Stockholm Olympic Stadium; Attendance: 18,000; Referee: Albert Meerum Terwogt (Netherlands)

15 October Friendly	Denmark	8 – 0	Norway	Copenhagen, Denmark
13:30 (UTC+1)	Rohde 2', 10', 57'; Olsen 12'; Nielsen 25', 40', 47', 70'	Report		Stadium: Københavns Idrætspark; Attendance: 10,000; Referee: Erik Alstam (Sweden)

=== 1917 ===
3 June Friendly	Denmark	1 – 1	Sweden	Copenhagen, Denmark
13:30 (UTC+1:00)	Nielsen 68'	Report	Börjesson 43'	Stadium: Idrætspark; Attendance: 25,000; Referee: Hagbard Vestergaard (Denmark)

17 June Friendly	Norway	1–2	Denmark	Kristiania, Norway
18:00 (UTC+1)	Helgesen 80'	Report	Olsen 70'; Wolfhagen 85' (pen.)	Stadium: Frogner stadion Attendance: 12,000; Referee: Ernst Albihn (Sweden)

7 October Friendly	Denmark	12–0	Norway	Copenhagen, Denmark
13:30 (UTC+1)	Rohde 5', 28'; Klein 9', 13', 25'; Berth 68'; Nielsen 71', 75', 77', 78', 81'; Olsen 83'	Report		Stadium: Københavns Idrætspark; Attendance: 15,000; Referee: Ernst Albihn (Sweden)

14 October Friendly	Sweden	1 – 2	Denmark	Stockholm, Sweden
14:00 (UTC+1)	Gustafsson 47'	Report	Olsen 20'; Grøthan 79'	Stadium: Stockholm Olympic Stadium; Attendance: 20,000; Referee: Albert Meerum Terwogt (Netherlands)

=== 1918 ===
2 June Friendly	Denmark	3 – 0	Sweden	Copenhagen, Denmark
13:30 (UTC+1)	Hansen 27', 52'; Nielsen 73'	Report		Stadium: Idrætspark; Attendance: 22,000; Referee: Per Christian Andersen (Norway)

16 June Friendly	Norway	3–1	Denmark	Kristiania, Norway
18:00 (UTC+1)	Helsing 25'; Helgesen 26'; Gundersen 70'	Report	Grøthan 88'	Stadium: Frogner stadion Attendance: 12,000; Referee: Ernst Albihn (Sweden)

6 October Friendly	Denmark	4–0	Norway	Copenhagen, Denmark
13:30 (UTC+1)	C. Hansen 19'; Blicher 24' (pen.); Olsen 49'; Nielsen 82'	Report		Stadium: Københavns Idrætspark; Attendance: 13,000; Referee: Ernst Albihn (Sweden)

20 October Friendly	Sweden	1 – 2	Denmark	Gothenburg, Sweden
13:00 (UTC+1:00)	Hjelm 54'	Report	Laursen 35'; Aaby 80'	Stadium: Ullevi Stadion; Attendance: 10,960; Referee: Per Christian Andersen (Norway)

=== 1919 ===
5 June Friendly	Denmark	3 – 0	Sweden	Copenhagen, Denmark
14:00 (UTC+1)	Nielsen 8', 60'; Thorsteinsson 34'	Report		Stadium: Idrætspark; Attendance: 22,000; Referee: Job Mutters (Netherlands)

12 June Friendly	Denmark	5–1	Norway	Copenhagen, Denmark
19:00 (UTC+1)	Nielsen 24', 42', 59'; Rohde 27', 35'	Report	Helgesen 12' (pen.)	Stadium: Københavns Idrætspark; Attendance: 15,000; Referee: Ernst Albihn (Sweden)

21 September Friendly	Norway	3–2	Denmark	Kristiania, Norway
13:00 (UTC+1)	Gundersen 11', 82'; Helgesen 77'	Report	Nielsen 18', 72'	Stadium: Gressbanen; Attendance: 12,000; Referee: Ernst Albihn (Sweden)

12 October Friendly	Sweden	3 – 0	Denmark	Stockholm, Sweden
13:30 (UTC+1)	Carlsson 2', 35', 88'	Report		Stadium: Stockholm Olympic Stadium; Attendance: 18,663; Referee: Jack Howcroft (England)

== 1920s ==
=== 1920 ===
5 April Friendly	Netherlands	2 – 0	Denmark	Amsterdam, Nedtherlands
14:30 (UTC+1)	Kessler 4' de Natris 71'	Report		Stadium: Oude Stadium; Attendance: 30,000; Referee: Job Mutters (Netherlands)

13 June Friendly	Norway	1 – 1	Denmark	Kristiania, Norway
19:30 (UTC+1)	Gundersen 4'	Report	Andersen 42'	Stadium: Gressbanen; Attendance: 14,000; Referee: Ernst Albihn (Sweden)

28 August 1920 Summer Olympics First round	Spain	1–0	Denmark	La Butte, Brussels
15:30 (UTC+1)	Arabolaza 54'	Report		Attendance: 3,000; Referee: Willem Eymers (Netherlands)

10 October Friendly	Sweden	0 – 2	Denmark	Stockholm, Sweden
14:00 (UTC+1)		Report	Hansen 19'; Michael Rohde 41'	Stadium: Råsunda; Attendance: 12,000; Referee: Willem Boas (Netherlands)

=== 1921 ===
12 June Friendly	Denmark	1–1	Netherlands	Copenhagen, Denmark
13:30 (UTC+1)	Harry Hansen 76'	Report	van Gendt 50'	Stadium: Københavns Idrætspark; Attendance: 20,000; Referee: Ernst Albihn (Sweden)

2 October Friendly	Denmark	3–1	Norway	Copenhagen, Denmark
13:30 (UTC+1)	Nielsen 7', 51', 75'	Report	Helgesen 64'	Stadium: Københavns Idrætspark; Attendance: 22,000; Referee: Artur Björklund (Sweden)

9 October Friendly	Sweden	0 – 0	Denmark	Stockholm, Sweden
13:30 (UTC+1)		Report		Stadium: Råsunda; Attendance: 18,000; Referee: Ragnvald Smedvik (Norway)

=== 1922 ===
15 April Friendly	Belgium	0 – 0	Denmark	Liège, Belgium
17:00 (UTC+1)		Report		Stadium: Stade Vélodrome de Rocourt; Attendance: 20,000; Referee: Olivier de Ricard (France)

17 April Friendly	Netherlands	2 – 0	Denmark	Amsterdam, Nedtherlands
14:30 (UTC+1)	Rodermond 4'; Groen 60'	Report		Stadium: Oude Stadium; Attendance: 30,000; Referee: Hugo Meisl (Austria)

11 June Friendly	Denmark	0-3	Czechoslovakia	Copenhagen, Denmark
13:15 (UTC+1)		Report	Janda 8'; Dvořáček 36', 49'	Stadium: Idrætsparken; Attendance: 20,000; Referee: Heinrich Retschury (Austria)

10 September Friendly	Norway	3 – 3	Denmark	Fredrikstad, Norway
13:00 (UTC+1)	Gundersen 5'; Wilhelms 74'; Aas 89'	Report	Grøthan 30'; Nielsen 38', 76'	Stadium: Fredrikstad Stadium; Attendance: 10,500; Referee: Hjalmar Lundberg (Sweden)

1 October Friendly	Denmark	1–2	Sweden	Copenhagen, Denmark
13:30 (UTC+1)	Nielsen 38'	Report	H. Dahl 26'; A. Dahl 58'	Stadium: Københavns Idrætspark; Attendance: 23,000; Referee: Willem Eijmers (Netherlands)

=== 1923 ===
6 May Friendly	Czechoslovakia	2-0	Denmark	Prague, Czechoslovakia
17:30 (UTC+1:00)	Císař 19'; Sloup 39'	Report		Stadium: Stadion Letná; Attendance: 15,000; Referee: Jacques Hirrlé (Switzerland)

17 June Friendly	Denmark	3–2	Switzerland	Copenhagen, Denmark
13:00 (UTC+1)		Report	Pache 80'; Abegglen 87'	Stadium: Københavns Idrætspark; Attendance: 25,000; Referee: Dave Asson (England)

30 September Friendly	Denmark	2–1	Norway	Copenhagen, Denmark
13:30 (UTC+1)	St. St. Blicher 47'; Jørgensen 53'	Report	Johnsen 22'	Stadium: Københavns Idrætspark; Attendance: 20,000; Referee: Job Mutters (Netherlands)

14 October Friendly	Sweden	1 – 3	Denmark	Stockholm, Sweden
13:30 (UTC+1)	Sundberg 81' (pen.)	Report	Jørgensen 20'; Nilsson 27'; Vilhelmsen 87'	Stadium: Råsunda; Attendance: 18,000; Referee: Tom Robertson (Scotland)

=== 1924 ===
21 April Friendly	Switzerland	2 – 0	Denmark	Basel, Switzerland
15:00 (UTC+1)	Abegglen 3'; Dietrich 42'	Report		Stadium: Landhof; Attendance: 15,000; Referee: Job Mutters (Netherlands)

15 June 1924–28 Nordic Championship	Denmark	2-3	Sweden	Copenhagen, Denmark
13:00 (UTC+1)	Olsen 2'; Nilsson 47'	Report	Kaufeldt 59'; Rydell 71', 75'	Stadium: Idrætsparken; Attendance: 25,000; Referee: Noel Watson (England)

14 September 1924–28 Nordic Championship	Norway	1–3	Denmark	Kristiania, Norway
13:00 (UTC+1)	Berstad 11' (pen.)	Report	Olsen 21'; Nielsen 26', 31'	Stadium: Gressbanen; Attendance: 15,000; Referee: Eric Ohlsson (Sweden)

5 October Friendly	Denmark	2-1	Belgium	Copenhagen, Denmark
13:00 (UTC+1)	Nielsen 8', 34'	Report	Adams 59'	Stadium: Idrætsparken; Attendance: 20,000; Referee: Otto Ohlsson (Sweden)

=== 1925 ===
14 June 1924–28 Nordic Championship	Sweden	0-2	Denmark	Stockholm, Sweden
14:00 (UTC+1)		Report	Larsen 37'; Nielsen 65'	Stadium: Stockholms Stadion; Attendance: 19,000; Referee: Noel Watson (England)

21 June 1924–28 Nordic Championship	Denmark	5–1	Norway	Copenhagen, Denmark
13:30 (UTC+1)	Nilsson 7', 71'; Nielsen 49'; Rohde 73'; Ei. Larsen 81'	Report	Lunde 60'	Stadium: Københavns Idrætspark; Attendance: 23,000; Referee: Noel Watson (England)

27 September Friendly	Denmark	3–3	Finland	Aarhus, Denmark
14:00 (UTC+1)	Kelin 18' (o.g.); Jørgensen 61', 67'	Report	Eklöf 24', 35'; Koponen 41'	Stadium: Aarhus Stadium; Attendance: 15,000; Referee: Job Mutters (Netherlands)

25 October Friendly	Netherlands	4 – 2	Denmark	Amsterdam, Nedtherlands
14:00 (UTC+1)	Tap 41' van Slangenburgh 48', 49'; Buitenweg 73'	Report	Nilsson 61'; Jørgensen 88'	Stadium: Oude Stadium; Attendance: 30,000; Referee: Peco Bauwens (Germany)

=== 1926 ===
13 June Friendly	Denmark	4–1	Netherlands	Copenhagen, Denmark
13:30 (UTC+1)	St. St. Blicher 33'; Jørgensen 44', 58', 84'	Report	Buitenweg 60'	Stadium: Københavns Idrætspark; Attendance: 19,000; Referee: Otto Ohlsson (Sweden)

20 June Friendly	Finland	3 – 2	Denmark	Helsinki, Finland
18:00 (UTC+2)	Lönnberg 6'; Kelin 37'; Lönnberg 70'	Report	Petersen 12'; Bøge 16'	Stadium: Tölö bollplan Attendance: 5,000; Referee: Gustaf Ekberg (Sweden)

19 September 1924–28 Nordic Championship	Norway	2–2	Denmark	Oslo, Norway
12:30 (UTC+1)	Gundersen 24'; Berstad 35'	Report	Rohde 9', 48'	Stadium: Gressbanen; Attendance: 15,000; Referee: Axel Bergqvist (Sweden)

3 October 1924–28 Nordic Championship	Denmark	2-0	Sweden	Copenhagen, Denmark
13:30 (UTC+1)	Bendixen 41' (pen.); Rohde 70'	Report		Stadium: Idrætsparken; Attendance: 26,000; Referee: Peco Bauwens (Germany)

=== 1927 ===
29 May Friendly; NFF's 25th Anniversary Match	Norway	0–1	Denmark	Aker, Norway
13:00 (UTC+1)		Report	Uldaler 87'	Stadium: Ullevaal Stadion; Attendance: 15,000; Referee: Axel Bergqvist (Sweden)

12 June Friendly	Denmark	1–1	Netherlands	Copenhagen, Denmark
13:30 (UTC+1)	Hansen 49'	Report	Elfring 28'	Stadium: Københavns Idrætspark; Attendance: 21,000; Referee: Axel Bergqvist (Sweden)

19 June 1924–28 Nordic Championship	Sweden	0-0	Denmark	Stockholm, Sweden
14:00 (UTC+1:00)		Report		Stadium: Stockholms Stadion; Attendance: 20,000; Referee: John Langenus (Belgium)

2 October Friendly	Denmark	3–1	Germany	Copenhagen, Denmark
13:30 (UTC+1:00)	Rohde 23', 48'; Hansen 67'	Report	Kießling 10'	Stadium: Idrætspark; Attendance: 19,000; Referee: Ragnvald Smedvik (Norway)

30 October 1924–28 Nordic Championship	Denmark	3-1	Norway	Copenhagen, Denmark
13:30 (UTC+1)	Jørgensen 48'; Rohde 58'; Hansen 69'	Report	Gundersen 19'	Stadium: Idrætsparken; Attendance: 20,000; Referee: Alfred Birlem (Germany)

=== 1928 ===
22 April Friendly	Netherlands	1 – 1	Denmark	Amsterdam, Nedtherlands
14:30 (UTC+1)	Elfring 13'	Report	Kools 63'	Stadium: Oude Stadium; Attendance: 30,000; Referee: Peco Bauwens (Germany)

17 June 1924–28 Nordic Championship	Norway	2-3	Denmark	Oslo, Sweden
13:00 (UTC+1)	Berstad 64' (pen.); Andersen 81'	Report	Hansen 66'; Rohde 70'; Jørgensen 72'	Stadium: Ullevaal; Attendance: 18,000; Referee: Vidar Stenborg (Sweden)

16 September Friendly	Germany	2–1	Denmark	Nuremberg, Germany
15:30 (UTC+1)	Heidkamp 58'; Hofmann 68'	Report	Jørgensen 9'	Stadium: Städtisches Stadion; Attendance: 50,000; Referee: Paul Ruoff (Switzerland)

7 October 1924–28 Nordic Championship	Denmark	3-1	Sweden	Copenhagen, Denmark
13:30 (UTC+1)	Rohde 6'; Jørgensen 8'; Nilsson 31'	Report	Rydell 32'	Stadium: Idrætsparken; Attendance: 27,500; Referee: Fritz Spranger (Germany)

=== 1929 ===
16 June 1929–32 Nordic Championship	Sweden	3-2	Denmark	Gothenburg, Sweden
13:00 (UTC+1)	Nilsson 9'; Kaufeldt 31'; Kroon 49'	Report	Larsen 64'; Uldaler 66'	Stadium: Slottsskogsvallen; Attendance: 20,553; Referee: Peco Bauwens (Germany)

23 June 1929–32 Nordic Championship	Denmark	2-5	Norway	Copenhagen, Denmark
13:30 (UTC+1)	Jørgensen 32'; Christophersen 82' (pen.)	Report	Juve 41', 60'; Berg-Johannesen 69'; Andersen 72', 77'	Stadium: Idrætsparken; Attendance: 20,000; Referee: Alfred Birlem (Germany)

13 October 1929–32 Nordic Championship	Denmark	8-0	Finland	Copenhagen, Denmark
13:30 (UTC+1)	Jørgensen 11', 41', 73'; Hansen 30', 34'; Uldaler 61'; Eriksen 70'; Rohde 87'	Report		Stadium: Idrætsparken; Attendance: 20,000; Referee: Moritz Fuchs (Germany)
