= Nils Middelboe =

Danish footballer and referee (1887–1976)

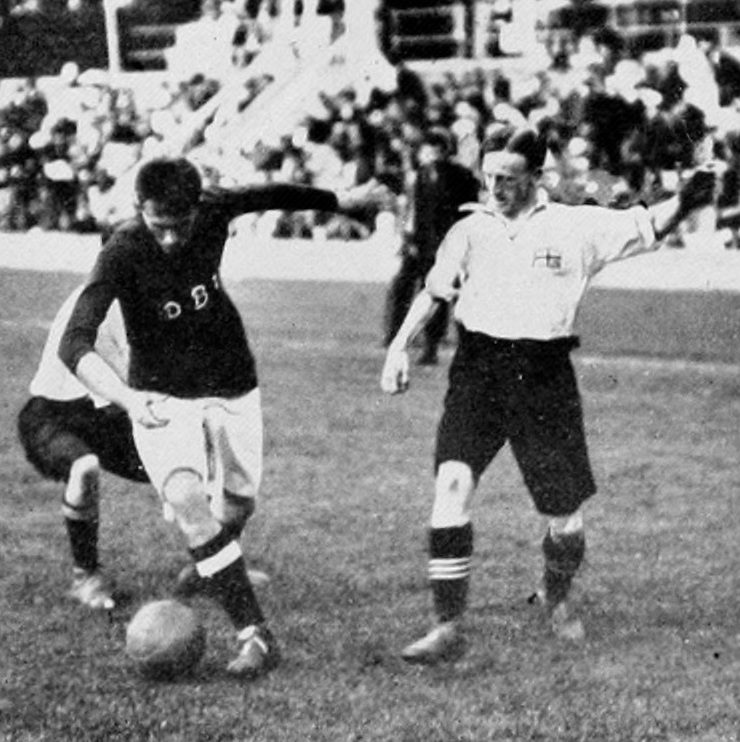
- Middeboe (in middle) dribbling past two opponents in the 1912 Summer Olympics final.

Personal information
- Date of birth: 5 October 1887
- Place of birth: Brunnby, Sweden
- Date of death: 21 September 1976 (aged 88)
- Place of death: Frederiksberg, Denmark
- Height: 1.88 m (6 ft 2 in)
- Position: Defensive midfielder

Senior career*
Years	Team	Apps	(Gls)
1903–1913	KB	55	(38)
1913	Newcastle United	0	(0)
1913–1922	Chelsea	41	(1)
1923–1924	Corinthian		
1924–1926	Casuals		

International career
1908–1920	Denmark	15	(7)
Medal record
Representing Denmark
Men's Football
Silver medal – second place	1908 London	Team competition
Silver medal – second place	1912 Stockholm	Team competition
- * Club domestic league appearances and goals

Nils Middelboe (5 October 1887 – 21 September 1976) was a Danish amateur track and field athlete and football player as well as a football referee and leader. He represented the Denmark national football team at the 1908, 1912 and 1920 Summer Olympics, winning silver medals in 1908 and 1912. He was the first ever goalscorer for the Denmark national football team, when he scored in Denmark's debut game at the 1908 Summer Olympics. In 1913, he moved abroad to play for English club Chelsea, and became the first foreign player to ever represent the club.

== Personal life ==
Middelboe was an amateur footballer throughout his career. He was a qualified lawyer and during his time at Chelsea he was employed at a bank in London. He would have gained thrice the salary as solely a professional footballer than he did as a banker-cum-amateur footballer, but he was (in his own words) "by no means mad about football". So as not to interfere with his career, Middelboe played in all home games, but was not required to travel to away games while at Chelsea. Middelboe was a man of great height for his time (standing at 6 foot 2 inches), which led to the media naming him "The Great Dane". He was also well respected as a gentleman of the game. He is buried in the Cemetery of Holmen in Copenhagen.

== Career ==
Middelboe was born in Brunnby, Sweden. He made his senior debut for Kjøbenhavns Boldklub (KB) in 1903, at the age of 16. At KB, he played alongside his older brothers Einar Middelboe and Kristian Middelboe, of whom Kristian also played for the Denmark national team. From 1904 to 1913 Nils won five KBU football championships with KB, while he also excelled in athletics competitions. He was a Danish triple jump and 4 x 100 metres relay champion, and he set Danish records in the 800 metres (with a time of 2:05.2) and triple jump (13.29 m).

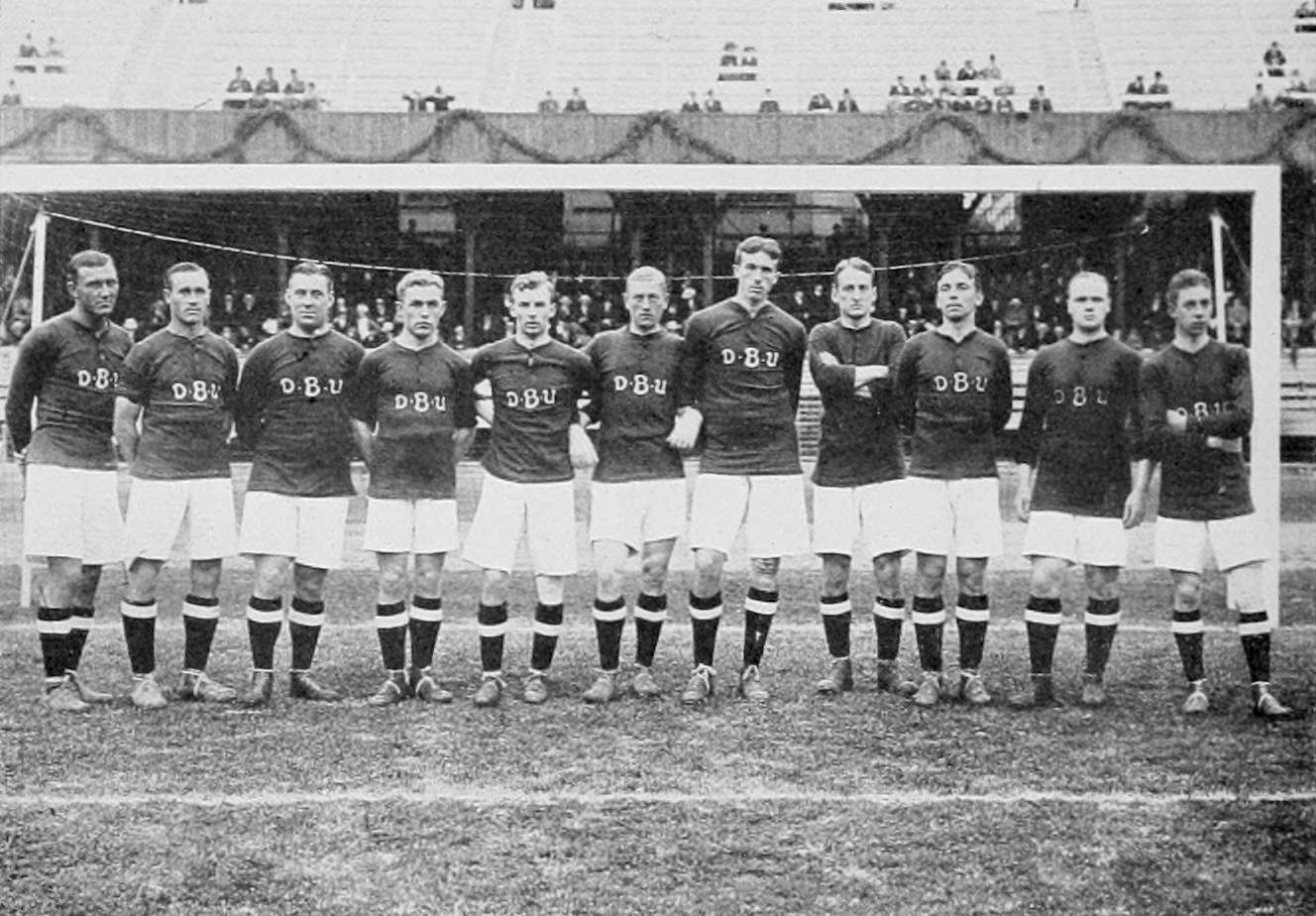
Danish soccer team at the 1912 Olympics, from left: Anthon Olsen, Sophus "Krølben" Nielsen, Harald Hansen, Paul Berth, Poul "Tist" Nielsen, Sophus Hansen, Nils Middelboe, Charles Buchwald, Oskar Nielsen, Emil Jørgensen, Vilhelm Wolfhagen.

Occupying the half-back role, he won silver medals with Denmark in both the 1908 and 1912 Olympic Games, the latter as captain of the side. His goal against France in 1908 was the first ever goal scored by an official national team in Olympic football. Middelboe won his 11th cap for Denmark in a friendly against Sweden, at the making him Denmark's all-time leading appearance maker. In all, he played 15 games and scored 7 goals for the Denmark national team from 1908 to 1920. The three times Middelboe played for his country while at Chelsea, he always represented KB, as opposed to Chelsea.

Nils Middelboe is renowned as the first non-British international to play for Chelsea, during his stint at the club between 1913 and 1923. Originally he had signed for Newcastle United; however, with the permission of the Newcastle Director, he switched to Chelsea. He made his debut on 15 November 1913 against Derby County at Stamford Bridge - a 2–1 win for Chelsea. As a show of faith from the players, he was appointed captain, despite never having previously played for the Chelsea first team. In all, he played 46 matches for Chelsea until 1922.

After his days at Chelsea, he played for the amateur sides of Corinthian F.C. and Casuals F.C. until 1926. In 1929 he was appointed a Director of the English League Division Three south East London based side Clapton Orient. He returned to Denmark in 1936. It was through Middelboe's contacts in English football, that English coach Edward Magner was hired to coach the Denmark national team in 1939. As an interpreter, Middelboe mediated Magner's tactical instructions on the modern WM formation to the team, a formation Middelboe himself was a known critic of.

As a coach for KB, he led the team to the Danish football championship in 1940. In April 1946, Chelsea played KB in a friendly, arranged to celebrate that club's 70th anniversary. The chairman of KB announced that, owing to Middelboe's "long and happy association" with Chelsea, there was no other club they would rather be facing.

== Honours ==
=== As a player ===
- Danish championship: 1913

=== As a manager ===
- Danish championship: 1940

== Literature ==
- Glanvill, Rick (2005). Chelsea FC: The Official Biography - The Definitive Story of the First 100 Years. Headline Book Publishing Ltd. ISBN 0-7553-1465-4.
- (in Danish) Allan Nielsen, "Den Første ...", Politiken article, 6 January 1997
- Neilson N. Kaufman, honorary historian, Leyton Orient Football Club -
