= List of men's Olympic football tournament hat-tricks =

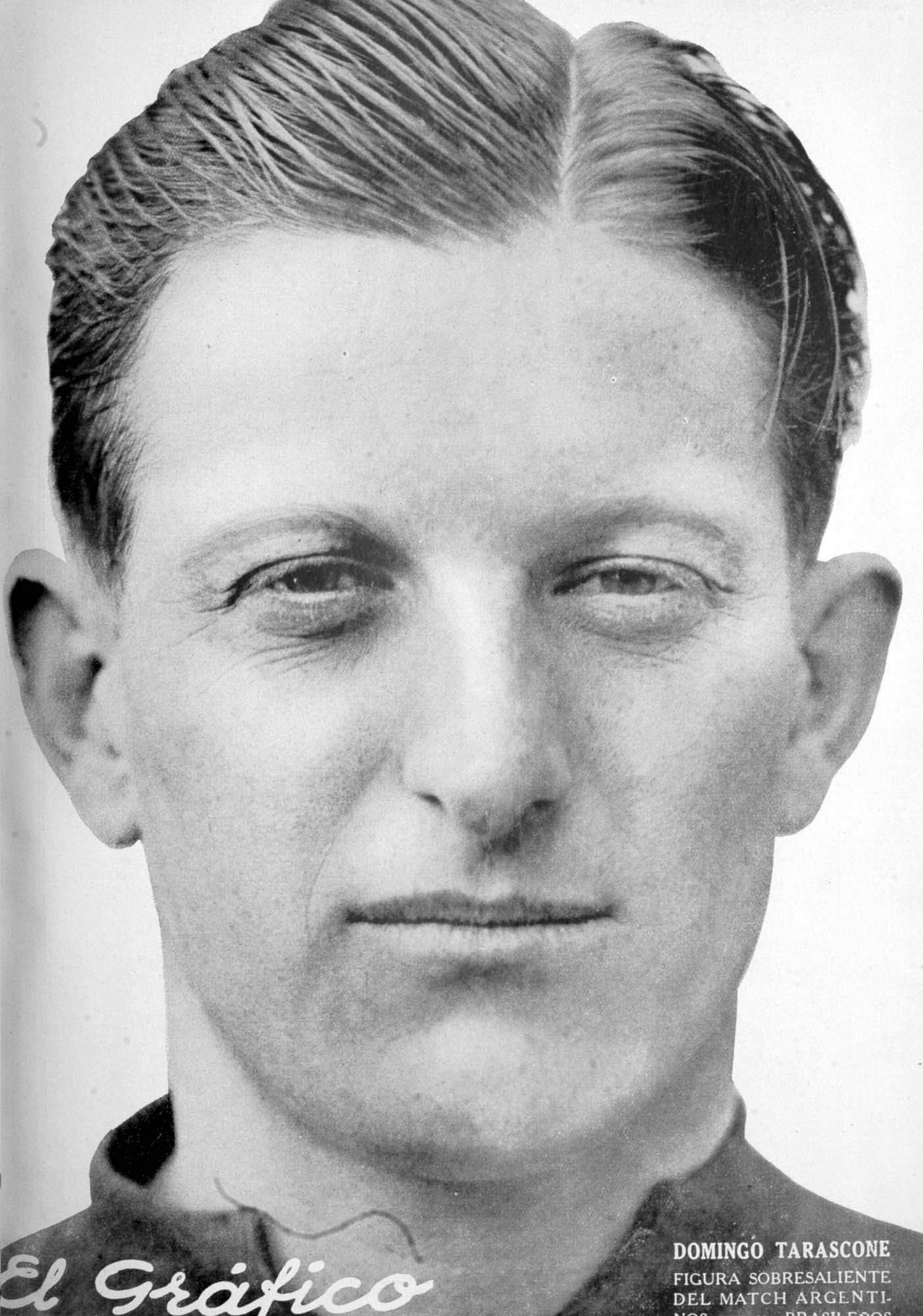
Domingo Tarasconi of Argentina holds the record for the most hat-tricks scored at the Summer Olympics with three.

Football at the Summer Olympics has been included in every Summer Olympic Games as a men's competition sport, except 1896 (the inaugural Games) and 1932 (in an attempt to promote the new FIFA World Cup tournament). Since the first official tournament in 1908 in England, 99 hat-tricks have been scored in over 1,000 matches of the 28 editions of the tournament. The first hat-trick was scored by Vilhelm Wolfhagen of the Denmark, playing against France B in 1908; the most recent was by Rafa Mir of Spain, playing against Ivory Coast on 31 July 2021. The only Olympic Football Tournaments not to have at least one hat-trick scored were the 1976, 2008, 2012 and 2024 editions. The record number of hat-tricks in a single Olympic Football Tournament is twelve, during the 1928 Olympics in the Netherlands, including three in the Bronze medal match as Italy defeated Egypt 11–3.

== List ==
Olympic Football Tournament hat-tricks
No.	Player	G	Time of goals	For	Result	Against	Tournament	Phase	Date	FIFA report
0.	Alexander Hall	3	??', ??', ??'	(Canada) Galt F.C.	7–0	(United States) Christian Brothers College	1904 Summer Olympics		16 November 1904	
1.	Vilhelm Wolfhagen	4	15', 17', 67', 72'	Denmark	9–0	France B	1908 Summer Olympics	First round	19 October 1908	
2.	Clyde Purnell	4	?', ?', ?', ?'	Great Britain	12–1	Sweden	1908 Summer Olympics	First round	20 October 1908	
3.	Harold Stapley	4	37', 60', 64', 75'	Great Britain	4–0	Netherlands	1908 Summer Olympics	Semi-finals	22 October 1908	
4.	Sophus Nielsen	10	3', 4', 6', 39', 46', 48', 52', 64', 66', 76'	Denmark	17–1	France	1908 Summer Olympics	Semi-finals	22 October 1908	
5.	Vilhelm Wolfhagen (2)	4	60', 72', 82', 89'	Denmark	17–1	France	1908 Summer Olympics	Semi-finals	22 October 1908	
6.	Harold Walden	6	21', 23', 49', 53', 55', 85'	Great Britain	7–0	Hungary	1912 Summer Olympics	Quarter-finals	30 June 1912	
7.	Anthon Olsen	3	4', 70', 88'	Denmark	7–0	Norway	1912 Summer Olympics	Quarter-finals	30 June 1912	
8.	Jan Vos	5	29', 43', 46', 74', 78'	Netherlands	9–0	Finland	1912 Summer Olympics	Bronze Medal match	4 July 1912	
9.	Gottfried Fuchs	10	2', 9', 21', 28', 34', 46', 51', 55', 65', 69'	Germany	16–0	Russia	1912 Summer Olympics – Consolation tournament	First round	1 July 1912	
10.	Fritz Förderer	4	6', 27', 53', 66'	Germany	16–0	Russia	1912 Summer Olympics – Consolation tournament	First round	1 July 1912	
11.	Imre Schlosser	3	3', 39', 82'	Hungary	3-1	Germany	1912 Summer Olympics – Consolation tournament	Semi-finals	3 July 1912	
12.	Jan Vanik	3	20', 46', 79'	Czechoslovakia	7–0	(Kingdom of Yugoslavia) Kingdom of SCS	1920 Summer Olympics	First round	28 August 1920	
13.	Antonín Janda	3	34', 50', 75'	Czechoslovakia	7–0	(Kingdom of Yugoslavia) Kingdom of SCS	1920 Summer Olympics	First round	28 August 1920	
14.	Herbert Karlsson	5	15', 20', 21', 51', 85'	Sweden	9–0	Greece	1920 Summer Olympics	First round	28 August 1920	
15.	Antonín Janda (2)	3	17', 66', 77'	Czechoslovakia	4–0	Norway	1920 Summer Olympics	Quarter-finals	29 August 1920	
16.	Robert Coppée	3	11', 52', 55'	Belgium	3–1	Spain	1920 Summer Olympics	Quarter-finals	29 August 1920	
17.	Otakar Mazal	3	18', 75', 87'	Czechoslovakia	4–1	France	1920 Summer Olympics	Semi-finals	31 August 1920	
18.	Paul Sturzenegger	4	2', 43', 68', 85'	Switzerland	9–0	Lithuania	1924 Summer Olympics	First round	25 May 1924	
19.	Max Abegglen	3	41', 50', 58'	Switzerland	9–0	Lithuania	1924 Summer Olympics	First round	25 May 1924	
20.	Édouard Crut	3	17', 28', 55',	France	7–0	Latvia	1924 Summer Olympics	Second round	27 May 1924	
21.	Kees Pijl	4	32', 52', 66', 68'	Netherlands	6–0	Romania	1924 Summer Olympics	Second round	27 May 1924	
22.	Rudolf Kock	3	8', 24', 77'	Sweden	8–1	Belgium	1924 Summer Olympics	Second round	29 May 1924	
23.	Sven Rydell	3	20', 61', 83'	Sweden	8–1	Belgium	1924 Summer Olympics	Second round	29 May 1924	
24.	Richard Hofmann	3	17', 75', 85'	Germany	4–0	Switzerland	1928 Summer Olympics	First round	28 May 1928	
25.	Mahmoud Mokhtar	3	46', 50', 63'	Egypt	7–1	Turkey	1928 Summer Olympics	First round	28 May 1928	
26.	Domingo Tarasconi	4	24', 63', 66', 89'	Argentina	11–2	United States	1928 Summer Olympics	First round	29 May 1928	
27.	Roberto Cherro	3	47', 49', 57'	Argentina	11–2	United States	1928 Summer Olympics	First round	29 May 1928	
28.	José Maria Yermo	3	43', 63', 85'	Spain	7–1	Mexico	1928 Summer Olympics	First round	30 May 1928	
29.	Domingo Tarasconi (2)	4	1', 10', 75', 89'	Argentina	6–3	Belgium	1928 Summer Olympics	Quarter-finals	2 June 1928	
30.	Pedro Petrone	3	35', 39', 84'	Uruguay	4–1	Germany	1928 Summer Olympics	Quarter-finals	3 June 1928	
31.	Domingo Tarasconi (3)	3	37', 54', 61'	Argentina	6–0	Egypt	1928 Summer Olympics	Semi-finals	6 June 1928	
32.	Angelo Schiavo	3	6', 42', 58',	Italy	11–3	Egypt	1928 Summer Olympics	Bronze medal match	9 June 1928	
33.	Elvio Banchero	3	19', 39', 49'	Italy	11–3	Egypt	1928 Summer Olympics	Bronze medal match	9 June 1928	
34.	Mario Magnozzi	3	72', 80', 88'	Italy	11–3	Egypt	1928 Summer Olympics	Bronze medal match	9 June 1928	
35.	Guillermo Subiabre	3	24', 48', 89'	Chile	3–1	Mexico	1928 Summer Olympics	Consolation first round	5 June 1928	
36.	Adolf Urban	3	16', 54', 75'	Germany	9–0	Luxembourg	1936 Summer Olympics	First round	4 August 1936	
37.	Wilhelm Simetsreiter	3	32', 48', 74'	Germany	9–0	Luxembourg	1936 Summer Olympics	First round	4 August 1936	
38.	Teodoro Fernández	5	17', 33', 47', 49', 70'	Peru	7–3	Finland	1936 Summer Olympics	First round	6 August 1936	
39.	Annibale Frossi	3	14', 75', 80'	Italy	8–0	Japan	1936 Summer Olympics	Quarter-finals	7 August 1936	
40.	Carlo Biagi	4	32', 57', 81', 82'	Italy	8–0	Japan	1936 Summer Olympics	Quarter-finals	7 August 1936	
41.	Gerard Wodarz	3	43', 48', 53'	Poland	5–4	Great Britain	1936 Summer Olympics	Quarter-finals	8 August 1936	
42.	Arne Brustad	3	15', 21', 84'	Norway	3–2	Poland	1936 Summer Olympics	Bronze medal match	13 August 1936	
43.	Francesco Pernigo	4	2', 57', 88', 90'	Italy	9–0	United States	1948 Summer Olympics	First round	2 August 1948	
44.	Gunnar Nordahl	4	25', 40', 78', 80'	Sweden	12–0	South Korea	1948 Summer Olympics	Quarter-finals	5 August 1948	
45.	Henry Carlsson	3	61', 64', 82'	Sweden	12–0	South Korea	1948 Summer Olympics	Quarter-finals	5 August 1948	
46.	John Hansen	4	30', 53', 74', 82'	Denmark	5–3	Italy	1948 Summer Olympics	Quarter-finals	5 August 1948	
47.	Branko Zebec	4	17', 23', 60', 87'	Yugoslavia	10–1	India	1952 Summer Olympics	Preliminary round	15 July 1952	
48.	Aredio Gimona	3	3', 51', 75'	Italy	8–0	United States	1952 Summer Olympics	Preliminary round	16 July 1952	
49.	Joseph Roller	3	60', 95', 97'	Luxembourg	5–3	Great Britain	1952 Summer Olympics	Preliminary round	16 July 1952	
50.	Elsayed Eldizwi	3	66', 75', 80'	Egypt	5–4	Chile	1952 Summer Olympics	Preliminary round	16 July 1952	
51.	Vsevolod Bobrov	3	53', 77', 87'	Yugoslavia	5–5	Soviet Union	1952 Summer Olympics	First round	20 July 1952	
52.	John Laybourne	3	30', 82', 85'	Great Britain	9–0	Thailand	1956 Summer Olympics	Preliminary round	26 November 1956	
53.	Muhamed Mujić	3	16', 35', 56'	Yugoslavia	9–1	United States	1956 Summer Olympics	Quarter-finals	28 November 1956	
54.	Todor Veselinović	3	10', 84', 90'	Yugoslavia	9–1	United States	1956 Summer Olympics	Quarter-finals	28 November 1956	
55.	Dimitar Milanov	3	45', 75', 80'	Bulgaria	6–1	Great Britain	1956 Summer Olympics	Quarter-finals	1 December 1956	
56.	Neville D'Souza	3	9', 33', 50'	India	4–2	Australia	1956 Summer Olympics	Quarter-finals	1 December 1956	
57.	Bora Kostić	3	32', 61', 63'	Yugoslavia	6–1	United Arab Republic	1960 Summer Olympics	Group stage	26 August 1960	
58.	Milan Galić	3	50', 57', 69'	Yugoslavia	3–3	Bulgaria	1960 Summer Olympics	Group stage	1 September 1960	
59.	Gérson	3	13', 16', 47'	Brazil	5–0	Formosa	1960 Summer Olympics	Group stage	29 August 1960	
60.	Ernst Pohl	5	7', 40', 42', 84', 89'	Poland	6–1	Tunisia	1960 Summer Olympics	Group stage	26 August 1960	
61.	János Göröcs	3	34', 59', 77'	Hungary	7–0	France	1960 Summer Olympics	Group stage	1 September 1960	
62.	Ferenc Bene	6	13', 38', 70', 74', 78', 87'	Hungary	6–0	Morocco	1964 Summer Olympics	Group stage	11 October 1964	
63.	Tibor Csernai	4	5', 11', 44', 63'	Hungary	6–5	Yugoslavia	1964 Summer Olympics	Group stage	15 October 1964	
64.	Ibrahim Riad	6	14', 17', 40', 48', 72', 77'	United Arab Republic	10–0	South Korea	1964 Summer Olympics	Group stage	16 October 1964	
65.	Ferenc Bene (2)	4	7', 20', 66', 77'	Hungary	6–0	United Arab Republic	1964 Summer Olympics	Semi-finals	20 October 1964	
66.	Slaven Zambata	4	3', 5', 43', 63'	Yugoslavia	1–6	Japan	1964 Summer Olympics	First consolation round	20 October 1964	
67.	Cornel Pavlovici	3	12', 19', 74'	Romania	4–2	Ghana	1964 Summer Olympics	First consolation round	20 October 1964	
68.	Kunishige Kamamoto	3	24', 72', 89'	Japan	3–1	Nigeria	1968 Summer Olympics	Group stage	14 October 1968	
69.	Yehoshua Feigenbaum	3	16', 30', 70'	Israel	5–3	Ghana	1968 Summer Olympics	Group stage	13 October 1968	
70.	Ladislav Petráš	3	17', 18', 68'	Czechoslovakia	8–0	Thailand	1968 Summer Olympics	Group stage	18 October 1968	
71.	Lajos Szűcs	3	30', 60', 75'	Hungary	5–0	Japan	1968 Summer Olympics	Semi-finals	22 October 1968	
72.	Bernd Nickel	4	17', 43', 70', 86'	West Germany	7–0	United States	1972 Summer Olympics	Group stage	31 August 1972	
73.	Ahmed Faras	3	19', 21', 25'	Morocco	6–0	Malaysia	1972 Summer Olympics	Group stage	31 August 1972	
74.	Oleh Blokhin	3	7', 13', 14'	Soviet Union	4–1	Mexico	1972 Summer Olympics	Group stage	1 September 1972	
75.	Antal Dunai	3	31', 40', 90+1'	Hungary	5–0	Iran	1972 Summer Olympics	Group stage	27 August 1972	
76.	Robert Gadocha	3	42', 49', 72'	Poland	5–1	Colombia	1972 Summer Olympics	Group stage	28 August 1972	
77.	Jürgen Sparwasser	3	39', 51', 89'	East Germany	7–0	Mexico	1972 Summer Olympics	Group stage	5 September 1972	
78.	Sergey Andreyev	3	8', 27', 44'	Soviet Union	8–0	Cuba	1980 Summer Olympics	Group stage	24 July 1980	
79.	Faisal Al-Dakhil	3	16', 40', 85'	Kuwait	3–1	Nigeria	1980 Summer Olympics	Group stage	21 July 1980	
80.	Stjepan Deverić	3	55', 76', 87'	Iraq	2–4	Yugoslavia	1984 Summer Olympics	Group stage	3 August 1984	
81.	Borislav Cvetković	3	21', 58', 70'	Yugoslavia	5–2	West Germany	1984 Summer Olympics	Quarter-finals	6 August 1984	
82.	Kalusha Bwalya	3	40', 55', 90'	Zambia	4–0	Italy	1988 Summer Olympics	Group stage	19 September 1988	
83.	Romário	3	20', 57', 61'	Brazil	3–0	Australia	1988 Summer Olympics	Group stage	20 September 1988	
84.	Jürgen Klinsmann	3	34', 42', 89'	West Germany	4–0	Zambia	1988 Summer Olympics	Quarter-finals	25 September 1988	
85.	Kwame Ayew	3	17', 55', 120+1'	Ghana	4–2	Paraguay	1992 Summer Olympics	Quarter-finals	2 August 1992	
86.	Andrzej Juskowiak	3	43', 52', 78'	Poland	6–1	Australia	1992 Summer Olympics	Semi-finals	5 August 1992	
87.	Bebeto	3	46', 53', 74'	Brazil	5–0	Portugal	1996 Summer Olympics	Bronze medal match	2 August 1996	
88.	Iván Zamorano	3	36', 45+1', 55'	Chile	4–1	Morocco	2000 Summer Olympics	Group stage	14 September 2000	
89.	Tenema N'Diaye	3	7', 24', 55'	Mali	3–3	South Korea	2004 Summer Olympics	Group stage	17 August 2004	
90.	Carlos Tevez	3	42', 82', 83'	Argentina	4–0	Costa Rica	2004 Summer Olympics	Quarter-finals	21 August 2004	
91.	Peter Etebo	4	10', 42', 52', 66'	Nigeria	5–4	Japan	2016 Summer Olympics	Group stage	4 August 2016	
92.	Ryu Seung-woo	3	32', 63', 90+3'	South Korea	8–0	Fiji	2016 Summer Olympics	Group stage	4 August 2016	
93.	Érick Gutiérrez	4	48', 55', 58', 73'	Mexico	5–1	Fiji	2016 Summer Olympics	Group stage	7 August 2016	
94.	Nils Petersen	5	14', 33', 40', 63', 70'	Germany	10–0	Fiji	2016 Summer Olympics	Group stage	10 August 2016	
95.	Max Meyer	3	30', 49', 52'	Germany	10–0	Fiji	2016 Summer Olympics	Group stage	10 August 2016	
96.	André-Pierre Gignac	3	57', 78', 86'	France	4–3	South Africa	2020 Summer Olympics	Group stage	25 July 2021	
97.	Hwang Ui-jo	3	12', 45+2', 52'	South Korea	6–0	Honduras	2020 Summer Olympics	Group stage	28 July 2021	
98.	Richarlison	3	7', 22', 30'	Brazil	4–2	Germany	2020 Summer Olympics	Group stage	22 July 2021	
99.	Rafa Mir	3	90+3', 117', 120+1'	Spain	5–2	Ivory Coast	2020 Summer Olympics	Quarter-finals	31 July 2021	

=== Notable Olympic Football Tournament hat-tricks ===
- Vilhelm Wolfhagen was the first player to score a hat-trick in an Olympic football match, on 19 October 1908, while playing for Denmark against France B.
- Four players have scored two hat-tricks in Olympic football matches: Vilhelm Wolfhagen (all in 1928); Antonín Janda (both 1920); Domingo Tarasconi (both 1970); and Ferenc Bene (1964).
- Only one player has scored three hat-tricks in Olympic football matches: Domingo Tarasconi (all in 1928). Tarasconi achieved that with 4 goals in the first round against United States, another 4 goals in the quarter-finals against Belgium, and three goals in the semi-finals against Egypt.
- There has been only one occasion when three hat-tricks have been scored in the same match. It occurred during the Bronze medal match of the 1928 edition, when Italy defeated Egypt 11–3, and Angelo Schiavo, Elvio Banchero and Mario Magnozzi, all playing for Italy, scored three goals, with the later starting his only in the 72' minute. Furthermore, there have been twelve occasions when two hat-tricks have been scored in the same match, with the most recent occurring during the 2016 edition: when Germany defeated Fiji 10–0, and Nils Petersen and Max Meyer, both playing for Germany, scored 5 and 3 goals respectively.
- The longest hat-trick to be completed (most time between the first and third goals), was scored by Kwame Ayew, who netted his first goal at 17', while the third goal came in extra time at 120+1'. Ayew achieved this feat in the 1992 Olympic Football Tournament, playing for Ghana against Paraguay in the quarter-finals.
- The quickest hat-trick is Sophus Nielsen, who scored at 3', 4', and 6' in the 1908 Olympic Football Tournament, playing for Denmark against France in the semi-finals, and he went on to net more 7 times. This is also the briefest hat-trick to be completed (the shortest time between the first and third goals), as the time between his first and third a mere 3 minutes.
- The only hat-trick scored by a substitute, is the one by Rafa Mir, in 2020 against Ivory Coast in the quarter-finals; he came on in the 90+2' minute, and scored at 90+3', 117', and 120+1'.
- Germany (incl. East and West Germany) holds the record for most hat-tricks scored with 11. The next closest is Yugoslavia with 8, and then Hungary and Italy with 7, closely followed by Argentina, Czechoslovakia, Denmark and Sweden with 5 each (Brazil and Great Britain have 4).
- United States holds the record for most hat-tricks conceded with 7. The next closest is France (incl. France B) and Japan with 5, being closely followed by Egypt, Fiji, Germany (incl. West Germany), Mexico, South Korea and Yugoslavia (incl. Kingdom of SCS) with 4.

== See also ==
- Football at the Summer Olympics
- List of men's Olympic football tournament records and statistics
