= Buitenweg =

Buitenweg is a surname. Notable people with the surname include:

- Kathalijne Buitenweg (27 March 1970), Dutch politician
- Wout Buitenweg (24 December 1893 – 10 November 1976), Dutch football player
