= Axel Thufason =

Danish footballer (1889–1962)

Medal record

Men's football

Representing Denmark

Olympic Games
Silver medal – second place	1912 Stockholm	Team competition

Martin Axel Thufason (11 November 1889 – 25 December 1962) was a Danish amateur football (soccer) player in the forward position. He played two games for the Denmark national football team, and won a silver medal at the 1912 Summer Olympics.

He started his senior career with Danish club B 93. He made his Danish national team debut in October 1911, and was selected for the Danish team at the 1912 Summer Olympics. He played one match at the tournament, the final game against Great Britain, as Denmark won silver medals. This was to be his last national team game. He played on for B 93, before ending his career with ØB.

His parents moved to Denmark from Sweden with the lastname Tufvesson, but changed this to Thufason of practical reasons. So it was easier to pronounce and spell. But probably they did not make it official in the public registers.
