= Alois Müller =

Austrian footballer (1890–1969)

Alois Müller (7 June 1890 – 30 March 1969) was an Austrian football player. He was born in Stockerau. He played for the Wiener Sport-Club, and also for the Austria national football team. He competed at the 1912 Summer Olympics in Stockholm.
