= Joseph Dines =

English footballer

Personal information
- Date of birth: 12 April 1886
- Place of birth: King's Lynn, England
- Date of death: 27 September 1918 (aged 32)
- Place of death: Pas-de-Calais, France
- Position: Centre half

Senior career*
Years	Team	Apps	(Gls)
- Lynn All Saints
- Lynn United
1904–1910	Lynn Town		
- → Norwich City (guest)
- → Woolwich Arsenal (guest)
- → Queens Park Rangers (guest)
1910–1912	Ilford		
1912	Liverpool	1	(0)
- Ilford
- Walthamstow Avenue
- Millwall
- Lynn Town

International career
	England amateur	27	(0)
1912	Great Britain	3	(0)
Medal record
Men's football
Representing Great Britain
Gold medal – first place	1912 Stockholm	Team competition
- * Club domestic league appearances and goals

Joseph Frank Dines (12 April 1886 – 27 September 1918) was an English amateur footballer who competed in the 1912 Summer Olympics.

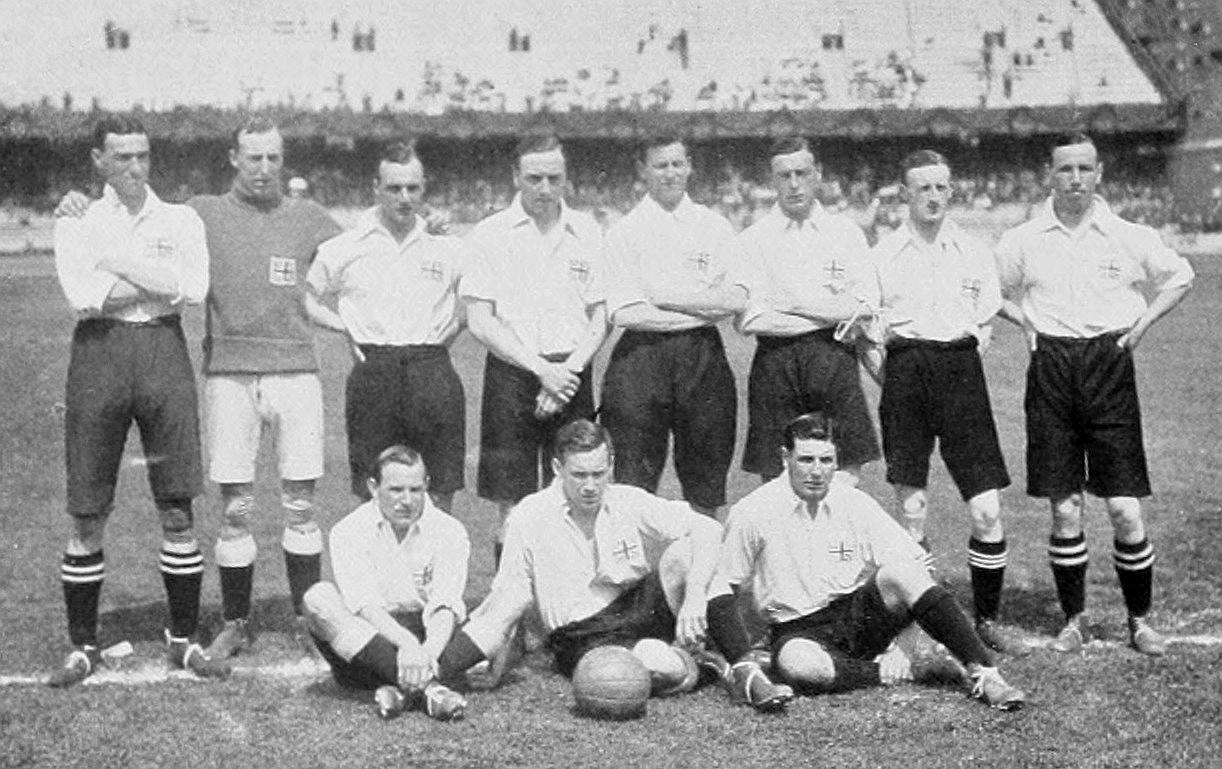
British squad at the 1912 Summer Olympics

He represented Great Britain as part of the England national amateur football team, which won the gold medal in the football tournament. He played all three matches.

Dines was born in King's Lynn, Norfolk, where he worked as a school teacher alongside playing local football in the town. He is listed in the 1901 census as a National Schools' Monitor. Dines later moved to the Ilford/South Woodford area, playing for local non-league club Ilford. Dines resisted attempts to become a professional, however played for Liverpool, Walthamstow Avenue and Millwall, as well as featuring for Norwich City and Woolwich Arsenal's reserves during his time at Lynn Town. During the First World War, he served in the Army Ordnance Corps, the Middlesex Regiment, the Machine Gun Corps and latterly as a second-lieutenant in the King's Liverpool Regiment. He was killed, aged 31, in Pas-de-Calais on the Western Front, He is buried in Harvincourt.

== See also ==
- List of Olympians killed in World War I
