= Harold Stamper =

English footballer

Olympic medal record

Men's football

Representing Great Britain
Gold medal – first place	1912 Stockholm	Team competition

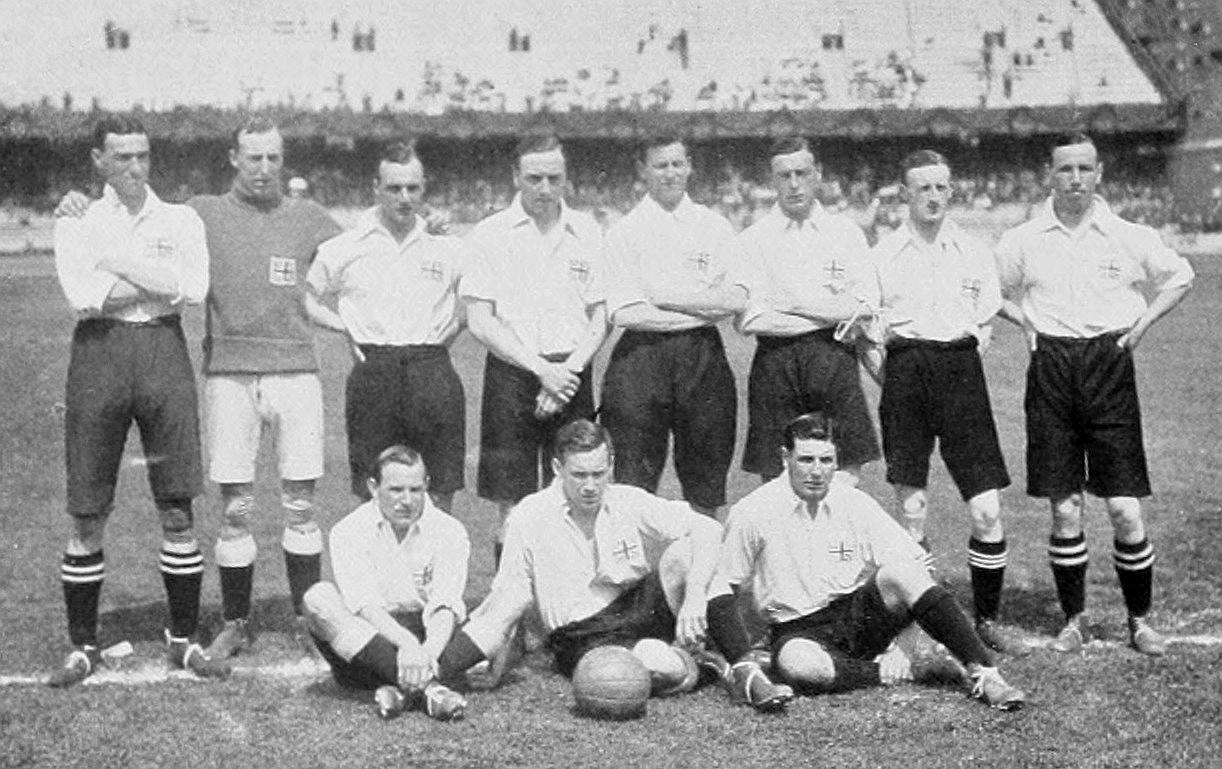

Harold Jack Stamper (6 October 1889 – January 1939) was an English amateur footballer who competed in the 1912 Summer Olympics. He was part of the English team, which won the gold medal in the football tournament. He played one match.
