= Franco Bontadini =

Italian footballer

Personal information
- Date of birth: 4 January 1893
- Place of birth: Milan, Kingdom of Italy
- Date of death: 27 January 1943 (aged 50)
- Position: Midfielder

Senior career*
Years	Team	Apps	(Gls)
1909–1910	Calcio Ausonia	?	(?)
1910–1911	Milan	7	(1)
1911–1920	Internazionale	47	(28)

International career
1912	Italy	4	(2)
- * Club domestic league appearances and goals

Franco Bontadini (Italian pronunciation: [ˈfraŋko bontaˈdiːni]; 4 January 1893 – 27 January 1943) was an Italian amateur footballer who played as a midfielder. He competed with the Italy national football team in the 1912 Summer Olympics.

== Career ==
At club level, Bontadini played for Calcio Ausonia, Milan, and Inter. At international level, Bontadini was also a member of the Italian Olympic squad in 1912 and played one match in the main tournament as well as two matches in the consolation tournament. He scored one goal in each tournament.
