= David Buitenweg =

Dutch footballer (1898–1968)

Personal information
- Date of birth: 29 October 1898
- Place of birth: Utrecht, Netherlands
- Date of death: 9 April 1968 (aged 69)
- Place of death: Utrecht, Netherlands
- Position: Forward

Senior career*
Years	Team	Apps	(Gls)
1917–1928	UVV		
1928–1929	Vitesse		
1929–1937	Hercules		

International career
1921	Netherlands	1	(0)
- * Club domestic league appearances and goals

David Buitenweg (29 October 1898 – 9 April 1968) was a Dutch footballer who played as a forward.

== Club career ==
Buitenweg played for UVV, Vitesse and Hercules during his career. He was the younger brother of Wout Buitenweg. He made his debut for UVV on 3 February 1918 in a home match against VOC, scoring his first goal in a 6–1 victory. In early 1924, management problems arose at UVV which led to Wout Buitenweg leaving the club. It initially seemed that Daaf would also leave UVV, and both brothers were linked to Sparta.

He appeared as a guest player for Sparta twice: once against Bolton Wanderers on 29 May 1924 and once against the Estonian national team on 7 June 1924.

Afterward, newspapers reported that both brothers would join Hercules, but Daaf ultimately decided to remain at UVV. After ten years in the first team, he left following the club's relegation to the second division in 1928. He spent one season with Vitesse, then returned to Utrecht to play for Hercules, where he was reunited with his brother.

== International career ==
Buitenweg earned one cap for the Dutch national team in 1921. The match, a friendly against Italy, ended 2–2.

No.	Date	Venue	Home team	Away team	Score	Comp.	Report
54	8 May 1921	Het Stadion, Amsterdam	Netherlands	Italy	2–2	Friendly	Report

== See also ==
- List of Netherlands international footballers
