= Douglas McWhirter =

English footballer

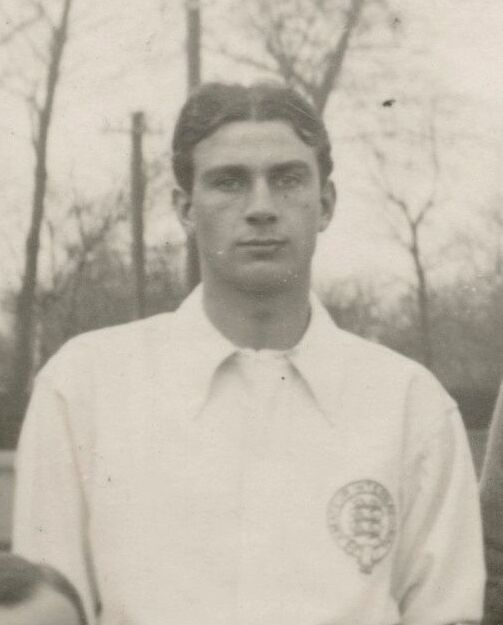

Medal record

Men's football

Representing Great Britain
Gold medal – first place	1912 Stockholm	Team competition

Douglas S. McWhirter (13 August 1886 – 14 October 1966) was an English amateur footballer who competed at the 1912 Summer Olympics.

McWhirter, born in Erith, Kent, was part of the English team, which won the gold medal in the football tournament. He played one match.
