= Hjalmar Christoffersen =

Danish footballer (1889–1966)

Personal information
- Full name: Hjalmar Johan Christoffersen
- Date of birth: 1 December 1889
- Place of birth: Copenhagen, Denmark
- Date of death: 28 December 1966 (aged 77)
- Place of death: Copenhagen, Denmark
- Position: Forward

Senior career*
Years	Team	Apps	(Gls)
- BK Frem

International career
1912	Denmark MNT	1	
- * Club domestic league appearances and goals

Medal record

Men's football

Representing Denmark

Olympic Games
Silver medal – second place	1912 Stockholm	Team competition

Hjalmar Johan Christoffersen (1 December 1889 in Copenhagen – 28 December 1966 in Copenhagen) was a Danish amateur football (soccer) player, who played in the forward position. He played one game for the Denmark national football team, as they won a silver medal at the 1912 Summer Olympics. During his career, he most notably played for Boldklubben Frem.
