= Karl Burger =

German footballer and manager

Personal information
- Date of birth: 26 December 1883
- Place of birth: Stuttgart, German Empire
- Date of death: 3 October 1959 (aged 75)
- Place of death: Freudenstadt, Germany
- Position: Midfielder

International career
Years	Team	Apps	(Gls)
1912	Germany	11	

Karl Schumm Burger (26 December 1883 in Stuttgart – 3 October 1959 in Freudenstadt) was a German amateur footballer who played as a midfielder and coach, competing as a player in the 1912 Summer Olympics.

== International career ==
He was a member of the German Olympic squad. He played one match in the consolation round of the football tournament in Stockholm. He scored one goal in the 16–0 victory against Russia. Overall Burger won eleven caps for the Germany national football team.
