= Jan van der Sluis =

Dutch footballer

Medal record

Men's football

Representing Netherlands

Olympic Games
Bronze medal – third place	1912 Stockholm	Team competition

Jan van der Sluis (April 29, 1889, in Rotterdam – October 19, 1952, in Rotterdam) was a Dutch amateur football (soccer) player who competed in the 1912 Summer Olympics. He was part of the Dutch team, which won the bronze medal in the football tournament.
