= Huug de Groot =

Dutch footballer (1890–1957)

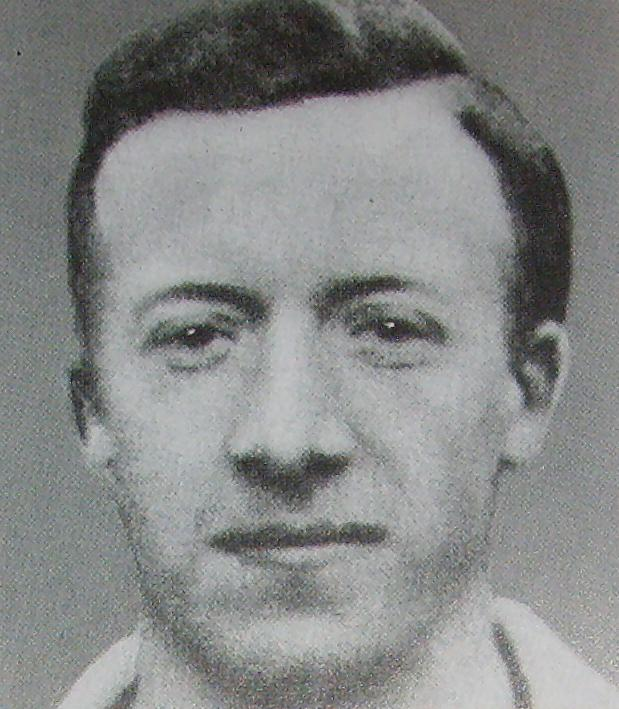

Personal information
- Full name: Henri Franciscus de Groot
- Date of birth: 7 May 1890
- Place of birth: Rotterdam, Netherlands
- Date of death: 18 April 1957 (aged 66)
- Place of death: Scheveningen, Netherlands
- Position: Forward

Youth career
- –1909: Sparta Rotterdam

Senior career*
| Years | Team | Apps | (Gls) |
| 1908–1917 | Sparta Rotterdam | | |

International career
| 1912–1914 | Netherlands | 10 | (6) |
Medal record
Men's Football
Representing Netherlands
Olympic Games
| Bronze medal – third place | 1912 Stockholm | Team competition |
- * Club domestic league appearances and goals

Henri Franciscus "Huug" de Groot (7 May 1890 – 18 April 1957) was a Dutch amateur football player who competed in the 1912 Summer Olympics.

He was part of the Dutch team that won the bronze medal in the football tournament. In 1913, he scored both goals in the Netherlands' first-ever victory over England. He scored 6 goals in 9 international games.

From 1908 to 1917, he played for Sparta Rotterdam. He once shot the bar in two in a game against DFC.
