= Harry Hansen (footballer) =

Danish footballer (1894–1946)

Personal information
- Full name: Ernst Harry Hansen
- Date of birth: 20 September 1894
- Place of birth: Holbæk, Denmark
- Date of death: 1 November 1946 (aged 52)
- Place of death: Copenhagen, Denmark
- Position: Forward

International career
Years	Team	Apps	(Gls)
1916–1922	Denmark	5	(0)

Harry Hansen (20 September 1894 – 1 November 1946) was a Danish footballer who played as a forward. He played club football at B1903 and Holbæk B&I. He made five appearances for the Denmark national team from 1916 to 1922.
