= Jan Vos (footballer) =

Dutch footballer and manager

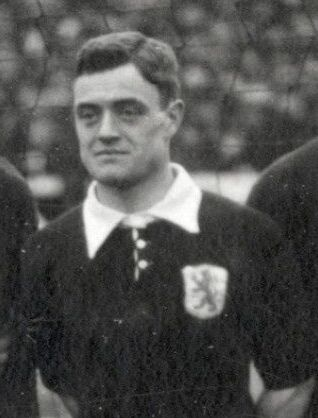

Medal record

Men's Football
Bronze medal – third place	1912 Stockholm	Team competition

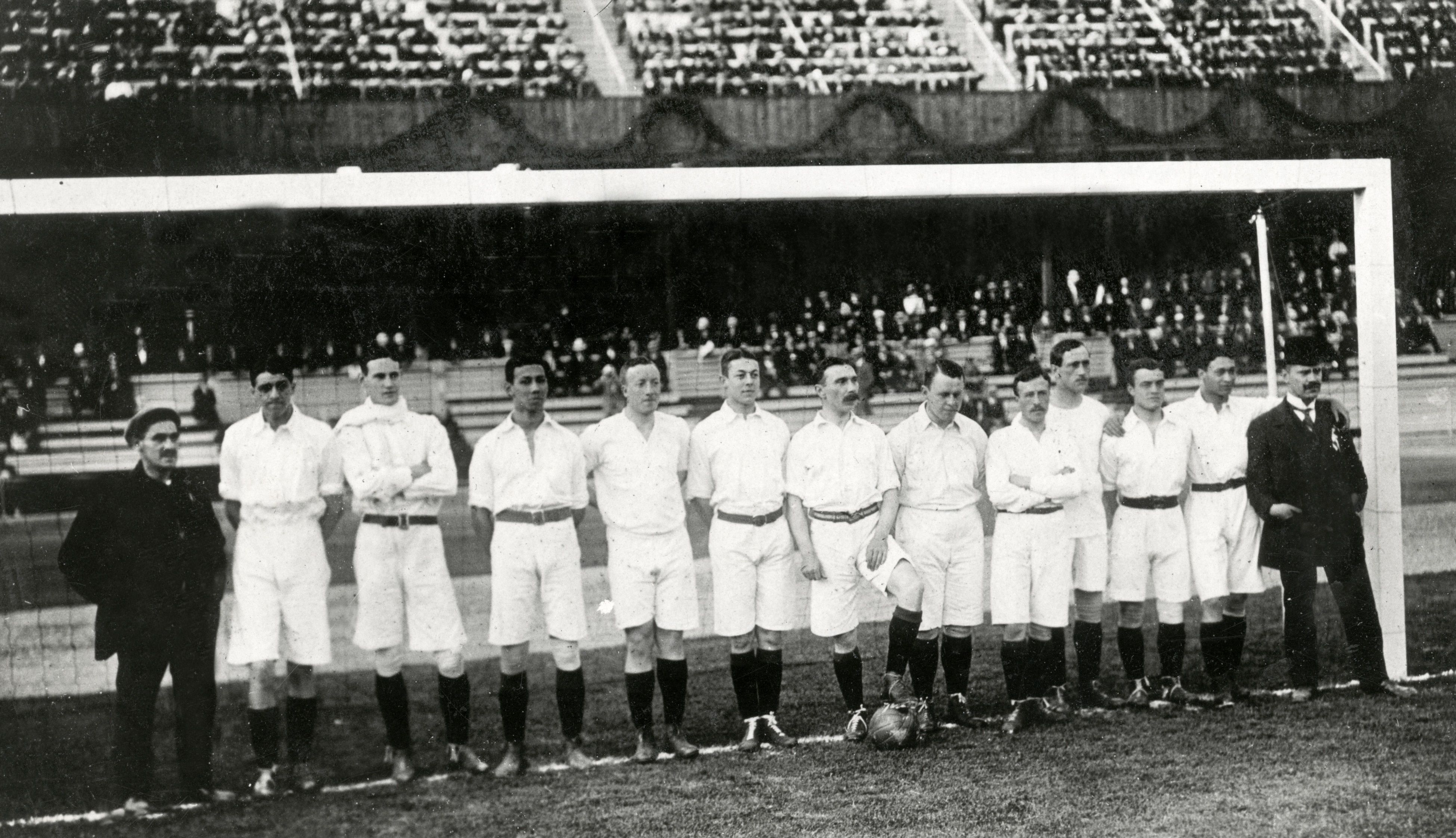
Jan Vos (third from right), Olympics 1912

See also Jan Vos (poet).

Jan Vos (April 17, 1888 in Utrecht – August 25, 1939 in Dordrecht) was a Dutch amateur football (soccer) player who competed in the 1912 Summer Olympics. He was part of the Dutch team, which won the bronze medal in the football tournament. With 8 goals scored, Vos was the 3rd best goalscorer in the tournament.
