= Sven Knudsen =

Danish footballer

Personal information
- Date of birth: 22 February 1892
- Date of death: 8 March 1968 (aged 76)

International career
Years	Team	Apps	(Gls)
1913–1916	Denmark	8	(3)

Sven Knudsen (22 February 1892 – 8 March 1968) was a Danish footballer. He played in eight matches for the Denmark national football team from 1913 to 1916.
