= Oskar Nørland =

Danish footballer (1882–1941)

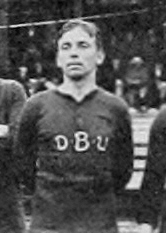
- Nørland with Denmark at the 1912 Summer Olympics

Personal information
- Full name: Niels Christian Oskar Nørland
- Birth name: Niels Christian Oscar Nielsen
- Date of birth: 4 October 1882
- Place of birth: Roskilde, Denmark
- Date of death: 18 May 1941 (aged 58)
- Place of death: Frederiksberg, Denmark
- Position: Forward

Senior career*
Years	Team	Apps	(Gls)
1898–1918	Copenhagen	133	(?)

International career
1908–1916	Denmark	14	(0)
Medal record
Men's Football
Representing Denmark
Olympic Games
Silver medal – second place	1908 London	Team competition
Silver medal – second place	1912 Stockholm	Team competition
- * Club domestic league appearances and goals

Niels Christian Oskar Nørland (4 October 1882 in Roskilde – 18 May 1941 in Frederiksberg, Copenhagen) was a Danish amateur football (soccer) player, who played 14 games as a forward for the Denmark national football team and won silver medals at the 1908 and 1912 Summer Olympics. He also won a gold medal at the unofficial 1906 Summer Olympics. Nørlund played his entire career with Copenhagen club KB, with whom he won several Danish football championships.

He was selected for the unofficial Danish national team at the 1906 Summer Olympics in Athens, which Denmark went on to win. He played in Denmark's first official national team game at the 1908 Summer Olympics, where he played two games as Denmark won silver medals. Four years later, he played another two games at the 1912 Summer Olympics, as Denmark won silver yet again. He ended his Danish national team career in October 1916, having played 14 games, though scoring no goals despite his forward position.

On 6 February 1914, he left the folk church; he married Julÿette Frederikke Jenny Fischer on 21 February 1914, and changed his last name on 24 February 1914.
