= Otto Ohlsson =

Swedish football referee

Otto Ohlsson (29 September 1894 in Helsingborg, Sweden – 31 July 1944), also known as Otto Olsson, was a Swedish former football referee.

== Career ==
He officiated 19 international matches and was FIFA referee in 1924–1937. A match in Olympic Games 1936 quarter final, a match in 1934 World Cup qualifying match and others were in friendly matches. He was also assistant referee of Peco Bauwens in 1936 Olympic Games Final Match. He totally appointed 3 penalty kicks. Most of his officiated match were Germany's match by 10 match and he was second most match officiated referee of Germany history. He officiated friendly match in 1931 Germany-Austria in Berlin which is Germany's biggest home defeat (0:6).

Below his important matches that officiated:

Date	Match	Team1	Score	Score	Team2	venue
9 Jun 1924	WC 1934 Qualification	Netherlands	5	2	Irish Fre State	Amsterdam
7 August 1936	OG 1936 Quarter final	Japan	0	8	Italy	Berlin
