= Sophus Hansen =

Danish footballer and referee (1889–1962)

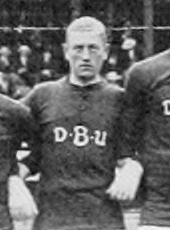
- Hansen with Denmark at the 1912 Summer Olympics

Personal information
- Full name: Sofus Peter Hansen
- Date of birth: 16 November 1889
- Place of birth: Copenhagen, Denmark
- Date of death: 19 February 1962 (aged 72)
- Place of death: Copenhagen, Denmark
- Position: Goalkeeper

Youth career
- –1906: Boldklubben Frem

Senior career*
| Years | Team | Apps | (Gls) |
| 1906–1921 | Boldklubben Frem | 160 | (0) |

International career
| 1911–1920 | Denmark | 31 | (0) |
Medal record
Men's Football
| Silver medal – second place | 1912 Stockholm | Team competition |
- * Club domestic league appearances and goals

Sophus Peter Hansen (16 November 1889 – 19 February 1962) was a Danish amateur football (soccer) player and referee. He won a silver medal with the Denmark national team at the 1912 Summer Olympics. He also participated with the Danish team at the 1920 Summer Olympics.

Born in Copenhagen, he played his entire career as a goalkeeper for local club Boldklubben Frem. He made his national team debut in 1911 and was the first player to reach 25 caps for the Denmark national team. He appeared in a record-setting 31 Demark national team games before ending his national team career in 1920. The record was broken by Poul "Tist" Nielsen in October 1923.[CN]

He is well known for stopping 2 crosses in the 1912 Olympic final against Great Britain.

In his civil life, Hansen was employed, at first, as a stonemason and later as an insurance man and in the years 1922–1934, excelled as a football referee, refereeing about 20 internationals. In the 1930 Mitropa Cup, Hansen refereed both the semifinals and both legs of the final between Sparta Prague and Rapid Vienna. Hansen was also a respected football jurist.

He died in February 1962 while living at Østerbro in Copenhagen.

== Bibliography ==
Autobiography

- Sophus Målmand, 1949
