= August Bøge =

Danish footballer (1892–1976)

Personal information
- Date of birth: 28 March 1892
- Place of birth: Korsør, Denmark
- Date of death: 12 October 1976 (aged 84)
- Position: Forward

International career
Years	Team	Apps	(Gls)
1926	Denmark	1	(1)

August Bøge (28 March 1892 – 12 October 1976) was a Danish footballer. He played in one match for the Denmark national football team in 1926.
