= Tranebergs Idrottsplats =

Former sports ground in Stockholm, Sweden

- "Tranan"
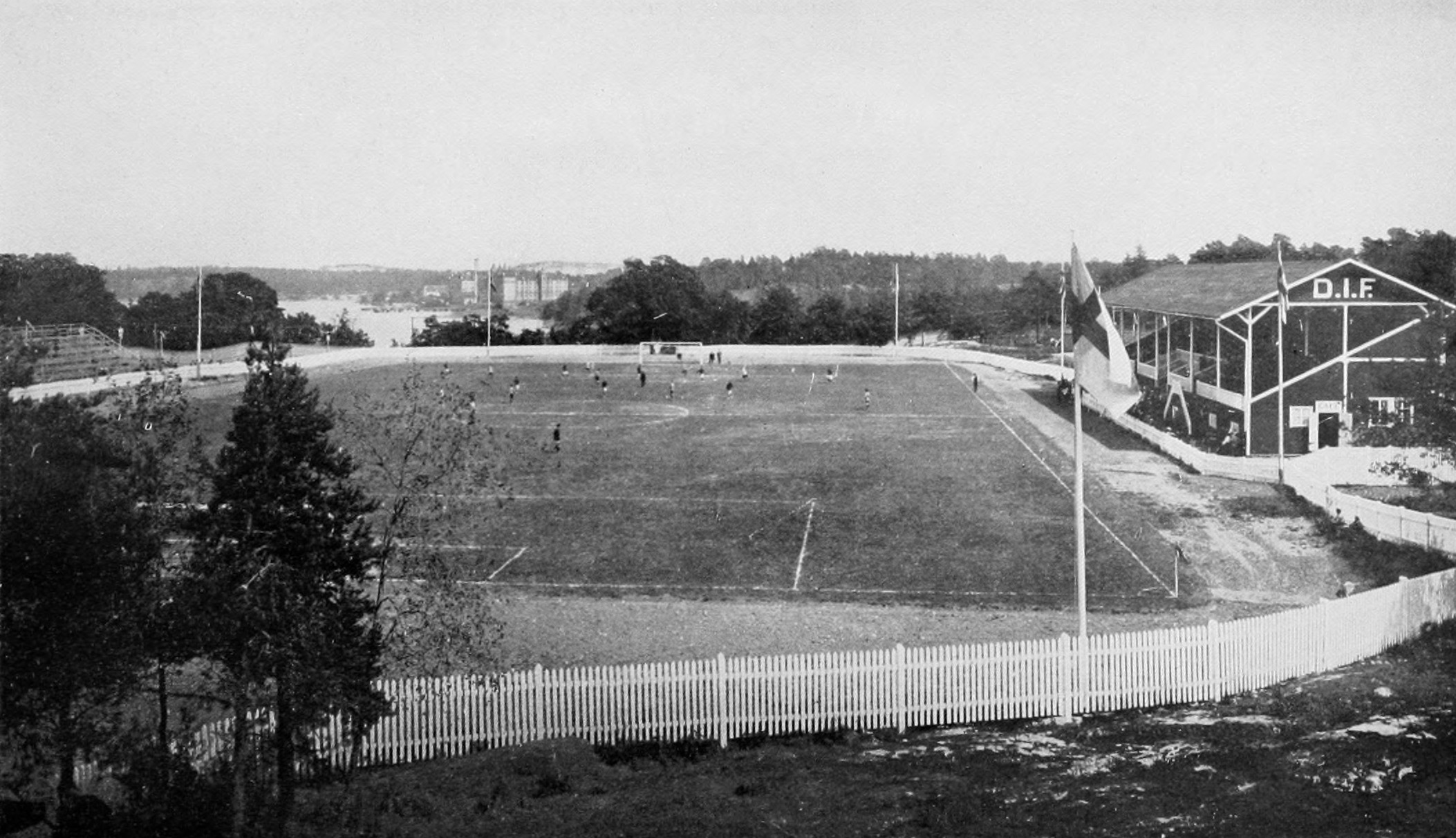
- Interactive map of Tranebergs Idrottsplats
- Location: (Sweden) Stockholm
- Coordinates: 59°20′4.92″N 17°59′17.18″E

Construction
- Opened: September 1911
- Closed: 29 September 1935

Tenant
- Djurgårdens IF (1911-1935)

Tranebergs Idrottsplats was a football stadium in Traneberg district, western Stockholm, Sweden. It was opened in September 1911. Tranebergs Idrottsplats served as the home ground of Djurgårdens IF for 25 seasons. The stadium was closed in September 1936, followed up by demolition.

== 1912 Summer Olympics ==
In 1912 Summer Olympics Tranebergs Idrottsplats hosted three football matches.

=== Matches ===
Date	Round	Team 1	Team 2	Result	Attendance
June 29	1st round	Italy	Finland	2–3	600
June 30	2nd round	Finland	Russia	2–1	300
July 1	Consolation tournament, 1st round	Austria	Norway	1–0	200
