= Emil Jørgensen =

Danish footballer (1882–1947)

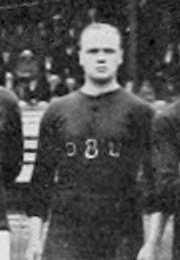
- Jørgensen with Denmark at the 1912 Summer Olympics

Personal information
- Full name: Emil Ludvig Peter Jørgensen
- Date of birth: 7 February 1882
- Place of birth: Gentofte, Denmark
- Date of death: 23 March 1947 (aged 65)
- Place of death: Gentofte, Denmark
- Position: Midfielder

Senior career*
Years	Team	Apps	(Gls)
–1901	ØB		
1901–1917	B.93	115	(11)

International career
1911–1912	Denmark	4	(1)
Medal record
Men's Football
Silver medal – second place	1912 Stockholm	Team competition
- * Club domestic league appearances and goals

Emil Ludvig Peter Jørgensen (7 February 1882 in Gentofte – 23 March 1947 in Gentofte) was a Danish amateur football player and administrator. He played four games for the Denmark national football team, and won a silver medal at the 1912 Summer Olympics.

== Biography ==
Jørgensen was an energetic and strong half back, with a knack for going on the offensive to shoot from the distance. He represented Danish clubs ØB and B 93.

He made his Danish national team debut in October 1911. He was part of the Danish team, which won the silver medal in the football tournament of the 1912 Summer Olympics. He had trouble getting the days off at his everyday workplace in the Copenhagen tax office, so Jørgensen missed the first Danish game of the tournament. He played two matches in the tournament and scored one goal as Denmark defeated the Netherlands 4-1 in the semi-final. Jørgensen and Denmark lost the final to Great Britain. His last international game came in October 1912, and all in all, Jørgensen played four games and scored one goal for Denmark.

With B 93, he won the club's first Danish football championship in 1916. He ended his career in 1917, having played 115 games and scored 11 goals for B 93 since his debut in 1901. During his active career, Jørgensen took the job of unpaid secretary of the Copenhagen Football Association in 1915, a position he kept until he died in 1947.

He was also in the Danish national team selection committee, which job it was to choose the roster for the national team. Additionally, he was a youth coach at B.93.
