= Harald Hansen (footballer) =

Danish footballer (1884–1927)

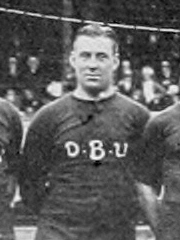
- Hansen with Denmark at the 1912 Summer Olympics

Personal information
- Date of birth: 14 March 1884
- Place of birth: Copenhagen, Denmark
- Date of death: 10 May 1927 (aged 43)
- Place of death: Aarhus, Denmark
- Position: Defender

Senior career*
Years	Team	Apps	(Gls)
1899–1916	B.93	117	(45)

International career
1908–1912	Denmark	7	(0)
Medal record
Men's Football
Silver medal – second place	1908 London	Team competition
Silver medal – second place	1912 Stockholm	Team competition
- * Club domestic league appearances and goals

Harald Hansen (14 March 1884 – 10 May 1927) was a Danish amateur football (soccer) player, who played as a defender for the Denmark national football team, with whom he won silver medals at the 1908 and 1912 Summer Olympics. He played his entire club career for Copenhagen club B 93.

== Career ==
Hansen took part in the first official Danish national team game, played at the 1908 Summer Olympics. He played all Denmark's three matches at the tournament, as the team won silver medals. Four years later, Hansen played all three Danish matches at the 1912 Olympics. In the semi-finals against the Netherlands, Hansen scored an own goal, as Denmark won 4–1. Like in 1908, Denmark met Great Britain in the final, and once more they won silver medals. Hansen ended his national team career after the 1912 Olympics, having played seven national team games.
