= Wout Buitenweg =

Dutch footballer

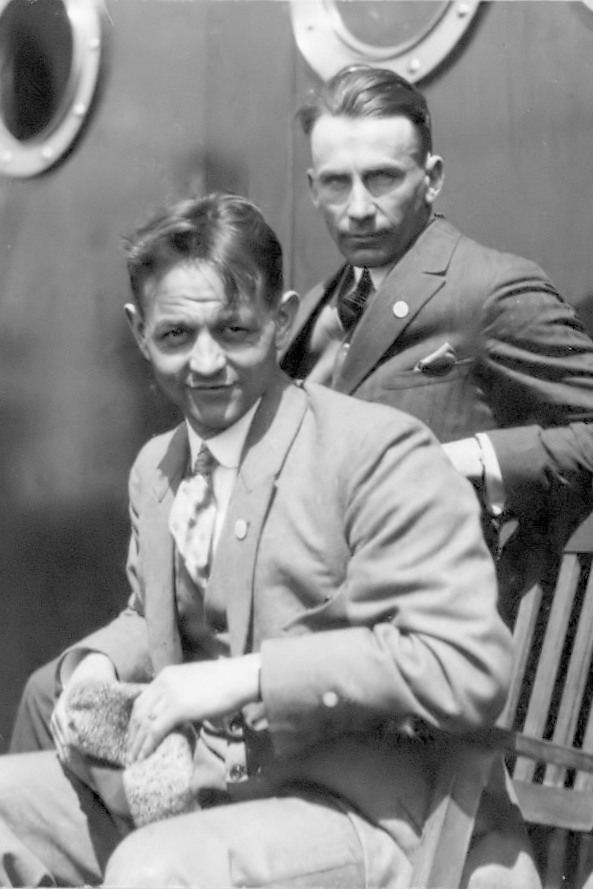
- Buitenweg and Harry Dénis in 1926

Personal information
- Full name: Wouter Marinus Buitenweg
- Date of birth: 24 December 1893
- Place of birth: Utrecht, Netherlands
- Date of death: 10 November 1976 (aged 82)
- Place of death: Netherlands
- Position: Striker

Senior career*
Years	Team	Apps	(Gls)
1909–1924	UVV		
1924–1933	Hercules		

International career
1913–1928	Netherlands	11	(14)
- * Club domestic league appearances and goals

Wout Buitenweg (24 December 1893 – 10 November 1976) was a Dutch footballer who scored 14 goals in 11 games for the Dutch national side.

== Club career ==
A prolific striker, Buitenweg played for hometown clubs UVV and Hercules as well as for BVC De Bilt.

== International career ==
Buitenweg made his debut for the Netherlands in a November 1913 friendly match against England and earned a total of 11 caps, scoring 14 goals. At the 1928 Summer Olympics, Buitenweg was used in a different position than his usual as a center forward in the first game against Uruguay and he demanded to be changed to his favourite position at half time. The coaches agreed, but the move did not work out well as they lost 0-2 and Buitenweg never played for the national team again.

== Personal life ==
Buitenweg's younger brother David also played for UVV and the national team.
