= Football at the 1912 Summer Olympics =

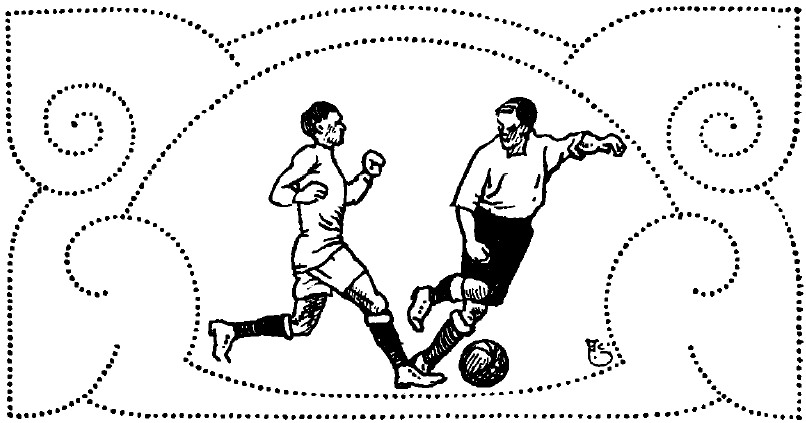
- Illustration from the Official Report

Tournament details
- Host country: Sweden
- City: Stockholm
- Dates: 29 June – 4 July 1912
- Teams: 12
- Venues: 3 (in 1 host city)

Final positions
- Champions: Great Britain (3rd title)
- Runners-up: Denmark
- Third place: Netherlands
- Fourth place: Finland

Tournament statistics
- Matches played: 17
- Goals scored: 94 (5.53 per match)
- Top scorer: (German Empire) Gottfried Fuchs (10 goals)

Football at the 1912 Summer Olympics was one of the 102 events at the 1912 Summer Olympics in Stockholm, Sweden. It was the fourth time that football was on the Olympic schedule.

Great Britain won the gold medals, representing the United Kingdom of Great Britain and Ireland (whom the IOC credits). Replicating the 1908 tournament, Denmark won silver medals and the Netherlands won bronze medals.

The Swedish Football Association ran the tournament, just as the English Football Association had organised the 1908 Olympic football competition in London, England. Three stadiums hosted the eleven matches of the main tournament from 29 June to 4 July 1912. Two were played at Tranebergs Idrottsplats in a suburb of Stockholm, five including the bronze medal match took place at Råsunda Idrottsplats, also outside Stockholm, and four including the final match were held at the Olympiastadion.

Seven teams were eliminated in two rounds ending with the quarterfinal matches, 30 June, and these teams played off in a consolation tournament from 1 July to 5 July, comprising six matches at the same three stadiums. Hungary won the consolation tournament.

== Venues ==
Stockholm
Stockholm Olympic Stadium	Stockholm area with location in Sweden inserted
Capacity: 33,000	Stockholm area with location in Sweden inserted
Råsunda IP	Stockholm area with location in Sweden inserted
Capacity: —	Stockholm area with location in Sweden inserted
Tranebergs Idrottsplats	Stockholm area with location in Sweden inserted
Capacity: —	Stockholm area with location in Sweden inserted

== Participants ==
The tournament saw a record 14 teams enter, all of them from Europe: however, the entry of Bohemia was rejected as their association had been voted out of FIFA in 1908, while Belgium withdrew two weeks before the draw due to a lack of players being available to travel. Subsequently, France withdrew three days after the draw: their opponents, Norway, were awarded a 2–0 victory.

The Football Association entered a British team; all of the players were English and the team is named in many reports as 'England'.

A total of 135+28 footballers from 11 nations competed at the Stockholm Games: (Note: 135 players took part in the main tournament, and another 28 players only played in the consolation tournament. Also there are 33 reserve players known, which are not included.)

- Austria (11+4)
- Denmark (15)
- Finland (13)
- Germany (11+11)
- Great Britain (14)
- Hungary (11+3)
- Italy (12+2)
- Netherlands (15)
- Norway (11+1)
- Russian Empire (11+4)
- Sweden (11+3)

== Course of the tournament ==
In the first round of the tournament, the hosts from Sweden went out in the opening match against the Netherlands. Fighting back from a 1–3 deficit with half an hour to go, Sweden only lost 4–3 on a goal scored by Dutch player Jan Vos in extra time. At Tranebergs Idrottsplats, Austrian football pioneer Hugo Meisl was the referee as Finland beat Italy, also in extra time.

In the second round, Finland won again, this time beating Russia, who had received a bye in the first round. By this stage, Great Britain team entered the contest, drawn to play against Hungary at Olympiastadion. Great Britain was captained by Vivian Woodward, a record-scoring centre-forward from Chelsea, who had formed part of Great Britain's gold medal winning side of the 1908 Summer Olympics. Led by forward Harold Walden, who scored six goals, Great Britain defeated Hungary by 7–0.

In the semi-final round, Walden scored all four goals as Great Britain defeated Finland 4–0. In the other semi-final Denmark beat the Netherlands 4–1; the Dutch consolation goal put behind goalkeeper Sophus Hansen by Danish defender Harald Hansen. For the second successive time, the final would pair Great Britain with Denmark, and like in 1908, the team representing Great Britain would win gold medals, although this game would be closer than the 4–2 score-line suggested. With no rule allowing substitutions, Denmark played with ten men after the 30th minute when Charles Buchwald was injured and had to be taken from the pitch on a stretcher.

A consolation tournament ran conjunctively with the tournament proper paired the losers of the first and second rounds, and was eventually won by Hungary, although no medals were awarded for the top three finishers in that tournament.

German player Gottfried Fuchs equalled the record for most goals in an international (set by Dane Sophus Nielsen in the 1908 Olympics) with 10 goals for Germany against Russia; this record stood until 2001.

== Bracket ==
First round
29 June – Stockholm
Italy	2
Finland (a.e.t.)	3
29 June
Norway (w/o)	2
France	0
29 June – Stockholm
Sweden	3
Netherlands (a.e.t.)	4
29 June – Stockholm
Austria	5
Germany	1

Second round
30 June – Stockholm
Great Britain	7
Hungary	0
30 June – Stockholm
Finland	2
Russia	1
30 June – Stockholm
Denmark	7
Norway	0
30 June – Stockholm
Netherlands	3
Austria	1

Semi-finals
2 July – Stockholm
Great Britain	4
Finland	0
2 July – Stockholm
Denmark	4
Netherlands	1

Gold medal match
4 July – Stockholm
Great Britain	4
Denmark	2
Bronze medal match
4 July – Stockholm
Netherlands	9
Finland	0

== Match details ==
=== First round ===
29 June 1912
11:00

Finland	3–2 (a.e.t.)	Italy
Öhman 2'; E. Soinio 40'; Wiberg 105'	Report	Bontadini 10'; Sardi 25'

Tranebergs Idrottsplats, Stockholm
Attendance: 600
Referee: Hugo Meisl (Austria)

29 June 1912
15:00

Austria	5–1	Germany
Merz 75', 81'; Studnicka 58'; Neubauer 62'; Cimera 89'	Report	Jäger 35'

Råsunda Stadium, Stockholm
Attendance: 2,000
Referee: Humbert Willing (Netherlands)

29 June 1912
19:00

Sweden	3–4 (a.e.t.)	Netherlands
Swensson 3', 80'; E. Börjesson 62' (pen.)	Report	Bouvy 28', 52'; Vos 43', 91'

Olympic Stadium, Stockholm
Attendance: 14,000
Referee: Wagstaffe Simmons (Great Britain)

29 June 1912

Norway	2–0 Awarded	France

=== Quarter-finals ===
30 June
10:00

Finland	2–1	Russia
Wiberg 30'; Öhman 80'	Report	Butusov 72'

Tranebergs Idrottsplats, Stockholm
Attendance: 200
Referee: Per Sjoblom (Sweden)

30 June
13:30

Great Britain	7–0	Hungary
Walden 21', 23', 49', 53', 55', 85'; Woodward 45'	Report

Tranebergs Idrottsplats, Stockholm
Attendance: 8,000
Referee: Christiaan Groothoff (Netherlands)

30 June
16:30

Denmark	7–0	Norway
Olsen 4', 70', 88'; S. Nielsen 60', 85'; Wolfhagen 25'; Middelboe 37'	Report

Tranebergs Idrottsplats, Stockholm
Attendance: 700
Referee: Ruben Gelbord (Sweden)

30 June
19:00

Netherlands	3–1	Austria
Bouvy 8' ten Cate 12'; Vos 30'	Report	Müller 41'

Tranebergs Idrottsplats, Stockholm
Attendance: 7,000
Referee: David Philip (Great Britain)

=== Semi-finals ===
2 July
15:00

Great Britain	4–0	Finland
Holopainen 2' (o.g.); Walden 7', 77'; Woodward 82'	Report

Olympic Stadium, Stockholm
Attendance: 4,000
Referee: Ruben Gelbord (Sweden)

2 July
19:00

Denmark	4–1	Netherlands
Olsen 14', 87'; Jørgensen 7'; P. Nielsen 37'	Report	H. Hansen 85' (o.g.)

Olympic Stadium, Stockholm
Attendance: 6,000
Referee: Ede Herczog (Hungary)

=== Bronze medal match ===
4 July
15:00

Netherlands	9–0	Finland
Vos 29', 43', 46', 74', 78' van der Sluis 24', 57' de Groot 28', 86'	Report

Råsunda, Solna, Stockholm
Attendance: 1,000
Referee: Per Sjoblom (Sweden)

=== Final ===
1912 Summer Olympics Football Final
4 July
19:00

Great Britain	4–2	Denmark
Hoare 22', 41', Walden 10'; Berry 43'	Report	Olsen 27', 81'

Olympic Stadium, Stockholm
Attendance: 25,000
Referee: Christiaan Groothoff (Netherlands)

Team details

Great Britain
Denmark

GK	Ronald Brebner
DF	Thomas Burn
DF	Arthur Knight
MF	Douglas McWhirter
MF	Henry Littlewort
MF	Joseph Dines
FW	Arthur Berry
FW	Vivian Woodward
FW	Harold Walden
FW	Gordon Hoare
FW	Ivan Sharpe
Head Coach:
Adrian Birch

GK	Sophus Hansen
DF	Nils Middelboe
DF	Harald Hansen
MF	Charles Buchwald
MF	Emil Jorgensen
MF	Paul Berth
FW	Oskar Nielsen
FW	Axel Thufason
FW	Anthon Olsen
FW	Sophus Nielsen
FW	Vilhelm Wolfhagen
Head Coach:
Charlie Williams

== Final summary ==
Pos	Team	Pld	W	D	L	GF	GA	GD	Pts
1st place, gold medalist(s)	Great Britain	3	3	0	0	15	2	+13	6
2nd place, silver medalist(s)	Denmark	3	2	0	1	13	5	+8	4
3rd place, bronze medalist(s)	Netherlands	4	3	0	1	17	8	+9	6
4	Finland	4	2	0	2	5	16	−11	4
5	Austria	2	1	0	1	6	4	+2	2
6	Russia	1	0	0	1	1	2	−1	0
7	Hungary	1	0	0	1	0	7	−7	0
8	Norway	1	0	0	1	0	7	−7	0
9	Sweden	1	0	0	1	3	4	−1	0
10	Italy	1	0	0	1	2	3	−1	0
11	Germany	1	0	0	1	1	5	−4	0

Source: FIFA

== Medallists ==
The database of the International Olympic Committee lists only the eleven players as medalists for each nation, who played in the first match for their nation. The following list contains these eleven players, as well as all other players who made at least one appearance for their team during the tournament.

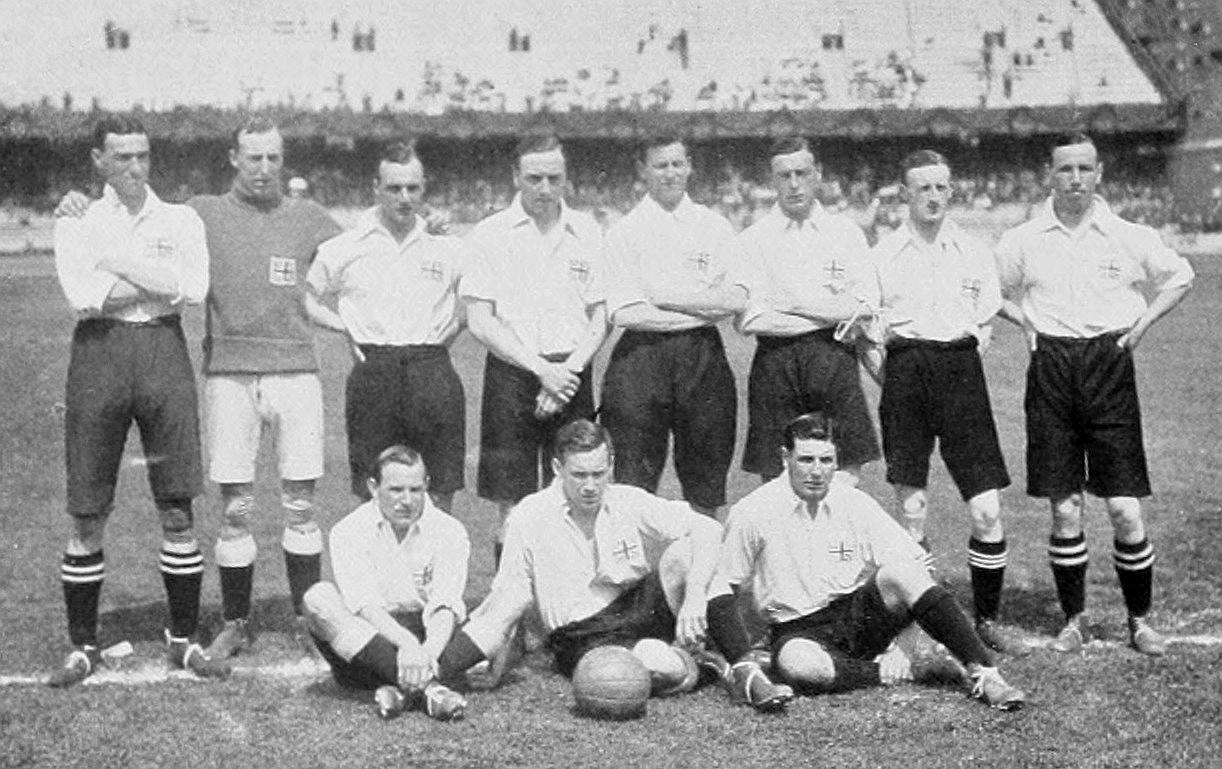
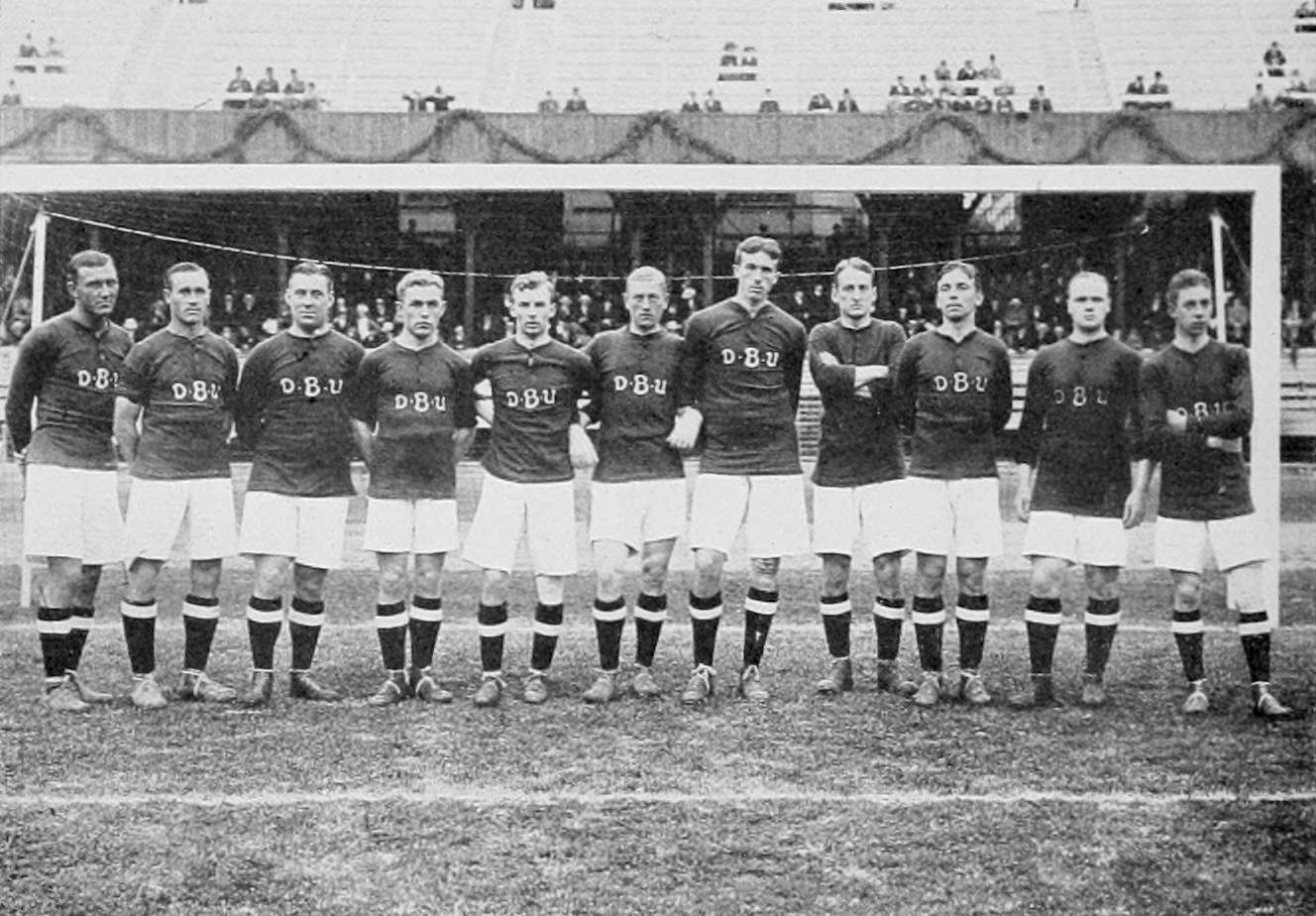
(Left): Great Britain, Gold Medal; (right): Denmark team, Silver Medal winner

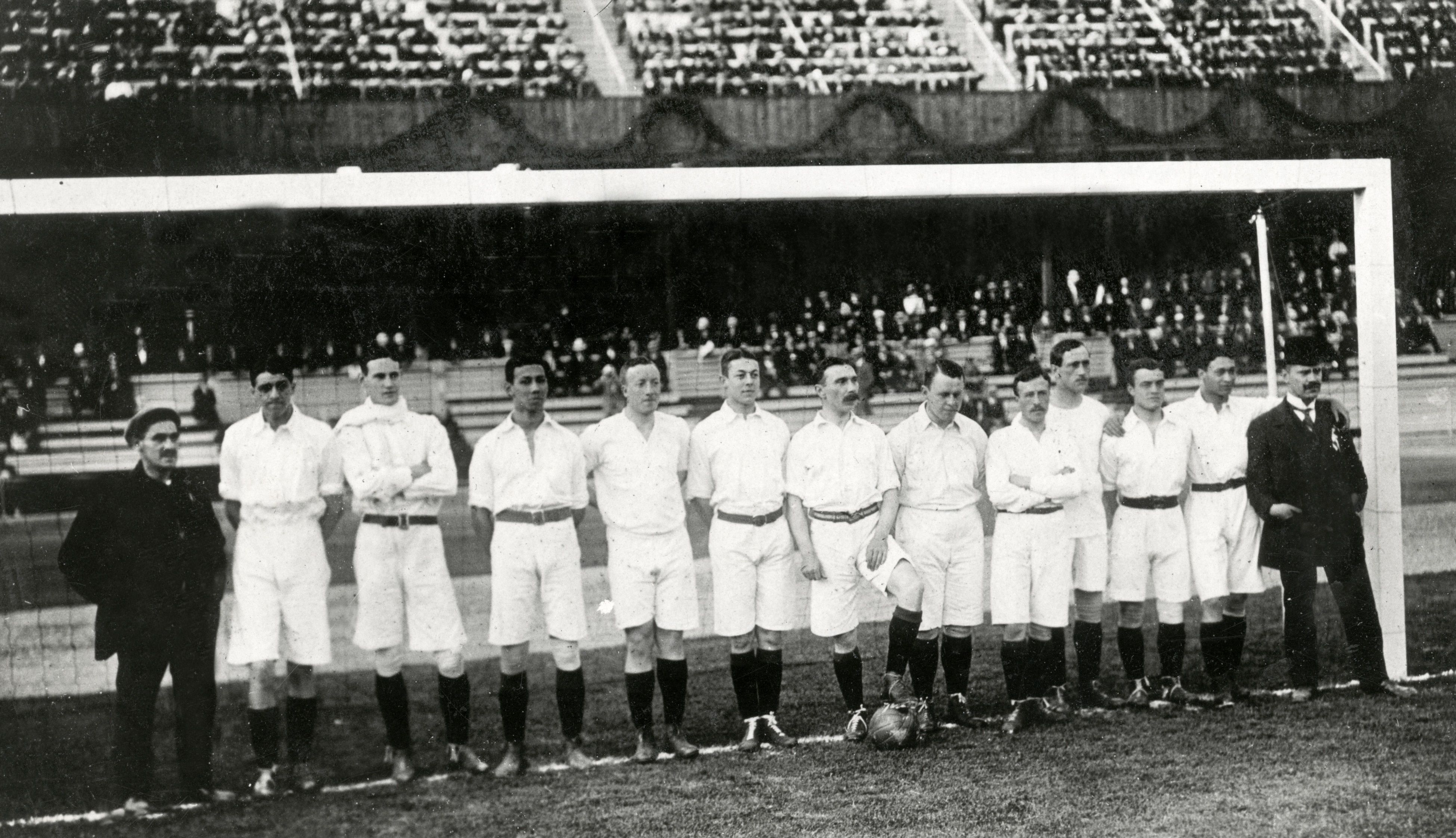
The Netherlands team, Bronze Medal

Gold	Silver	Bronze
Great Britain; Arthur Berry; Ronald Brebner; Thomas Burn; Joseph Dines; Edward Hanney; Gordon Hoare; Arthur Knight; Henry Littlewort; Douglas McWhirter; Ivan Sharpe; Harold Stamper; Harold Walden; Vivian Woodward; Gordon Wright	Denmark; Paul Berth; Charles Buchwald; Hjalmar Christoffersen; Harald Hansen; Sophus Hansen; Emil Jørgensen; Ivar Lykke; Nils Middelboe; Oskar Nielsen; Poul Nielsen; Sophus Nielsen; Anthon Olsen; Axel Petersen; Axel Thufason; Vilhelm Wolfhagen	Netherlands; Piet Bouman; Joop Boutmy; Nico Bouvy; Huug de Groot; Bok de Korver; Nico de Wolf; Constant Feith; Ge Fortgens; Just Göbel; Dirk Lotsy; Caesar ten Cate; Jan van Breda Kolff; Jan van der Sluis; Jan Vos; David Wijnveldt

== Consolation tournament ==
First round
Germany	16
Russia	0
Austria	1
Norway	0
Italy	1
Sweden	0

Semi-finals
Hungary	3
Germany	1
Austria	5
Italy	1

Final
Hungary	3
Austria	0

=== First round ===
1 July
11:00

Austria	1–0	Norway
Neubauer 2'	Report

Tranebergs Idrottsplats, Stockholm
Attendance: 200
Referee: Per Sjoblom (Sweden)

1 July
17:00

Germany	16–0	Russia
Fuchs 2', 9', 21', 28', 34', 46', 51', 55', 65', 69'; Förderer 6', 27', 53', 66'; Burger 30'; Oberle 58'	Report

Råsunda IP, Solna, Stockholm
Attendance: 2,000
Referee: Christiaan Groothoff (Netherlands)

1 July
19:00

Italy	1–0	Sweden
Bontadini 30'	Report

Tranebergs Idrottsplats, Stockholm
Attendance: 2,000
Referee: Herbert Willing (Netherlands)

=== Semi-finals ===
3 July
15:00

Hungary	3–1	Germany
Schlosser 3', 39', 82'	Report	Förderer 56'

Tranebergs Idrottsplats, Stockholm
Attendance: 2,000
Referee: Christiaan Groothoff (Netherlands)

3 July
19:00

Austria	5–1	Italy
Müller 30'; Grundwald 40', 89'; Hussak 49'; Studnicka 65'	Report	Berardo 81'

Olympic Stadium, Stockholm
Attendance: 3,500
Referee: Herbert Willing (Netherlands)

=== Final ===
1912 Consolation tournament Final
5 July
19:00

Hungary	3–0	Austria
Schlosser 32'; Pataki 63'; Bodnar 72'	Report

Tranebergs Idrottsplats, Stockholm
Attendance: 5,000
Referee: Herbert Willing (Netherlands)

== Statistics ==
=== Goalscorers ===
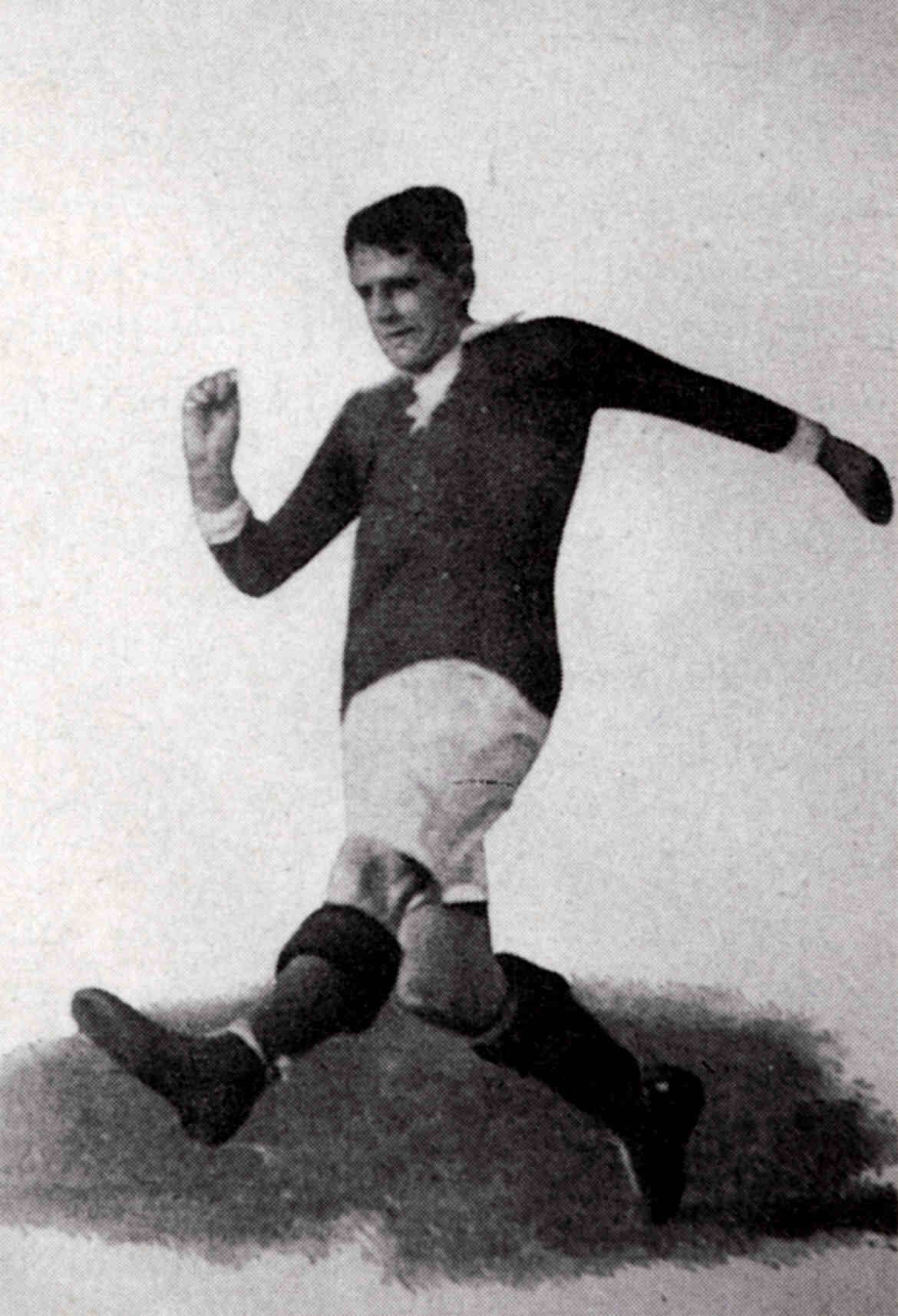
German player Gottfried Fuchs was the topscorer of the tournament with 10 goals

10 goals

- (German Empire) Gottfried Fuchs (Germany)

9 goals

- (United Kingdom) Harold Walden (Great Britain)

8 goals

- Jan Vos (Netherlands)

7 goals

- Anthon Olsen (Denmark)

5 goals

- (German Empire) Fritz Förderer (Germany)

4 goals

- Imre Schlosser (Hungary)

3 goals

- (Austrian Empire) Leopold Grundwald (Austria)
- Nico Bouvy (Netherlands)

2 goals

- (Austrian Empire) Robert Merz (Austria)
- (Austrian Empire) Alois Müller (Austria)
- Sophus Nielsen (Denmark)
- Jarl Öhman (Finland)
- } Bror Wiberg (Finland)
- (United Kingdom) Gordon Hoare (Great Britain)
- (United Kingdom) Vivian Woodward (Great Britain)
- Franco Bontadini (Italy)
- Huug de Groot (Netherlands)
- Jan van der Sluis (Netherlands)
- Iwar Swensson (Sweden)

1 goal

- (Austrian Empire) Robert Cimera (Austria)
- (Austrian Empire) Ludwig Hussak (Austria)
- (Austrian Empire) Leopold Neubauer (Austria)
- (Austrian Empire) Jan Studnicka (Austria)
- (Austrian Empire) Leopold Studnicka (Austria)
- Poul Nielsen (Denmark)
- Emil Jørgensen (Denmark)
- Nils Middelboe (Denmark)
- Vilhelm Wolfhagen (Denmark)
- Eino Soinio (Finland)
- (German Empire) Karl Burger (Germany)
- (German Empire) Adolf Jäger (Germany)
- (German Empire) Emil Oberle (Germany)
- (United Kingdom) Arthur Berry (Great Britain)
- Mihály Pataki (Hungary)
- Sándor Bodnár (Hungary)
- Felice Berardo (Italy)
- Enrico Sardi (Italy)
- Caesar ten Cate (Netherlands)
- (Russia) Vasily Butusov (Russian Empire)
- Erik Börjesson (Sweden)

Own goals

- Harald Hansen (Denmark; playing against Netherlands)
- Jalmari Holopainen (Finland; playing against Great Britain)
