= Paul Berth =

Danish footballer (1890–1969)

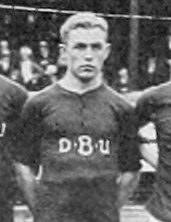
- Berth with Denmark at the 1912 Summer Olympics

Personal information
- Full name: Paul Ludvig Laurits Berth
- Date of birth: 7 April 1890
- Place of birth: Copenhagen, Denmark
- Date of death: 9 November 1969 (aged 79)
- Place of death: Gentofte, Denmark
- Position: Midfielder

Senior career*
Years	Team	Apps	(Gls)
1908–1924	Akademisk Boldklub	142	(?)

International career
1911–1922	Denmark	26	(1)
Medal record
Men's Football
Silver medal – second place	1912 Stockholm	Team competition
- * Club domestic league appearances and goals

Paul Ludvig Laurits Berth (7 April 1890 – 9 November 1969) was a Danish amateur Association football player, who played 26 games and scored one goal for the Denmark national team, with whom he won a silver medal at the 1912 Summer Olympics.

Berth played for Danish team Akademisk Boldklub (AB), when he made his Danish national team debut in October 1911. He was part of the Danish team at the 1912 Summer Olympics, in which he played all three matches as Denmark won the silver medals in the football tournament. With AB, he won the 1919 and 1921 Danish football championships. He was a part of the Danish squad at the 1920 Summer Olympics, but spent the tournament as an unused reserve. He ended his national team career in April 1922, having played 26 international games for Denmark, 14 of these as team captain.
