= Harold Walden =

English footballer (1887–1955)

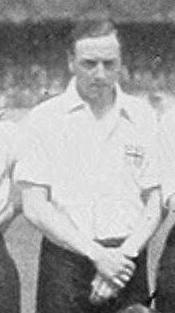

Personal information
- Full name: Harold Adrian Walden
- Date of birth: 10 October 1887
- Place of birth: India
- Date of death: 2 December 1955 (aged 68)
- Place of death: England
- Position: Forward

Senior career*
Years	Team	Apps	(Gls)
1911	Halifax Town	11	(5)
1911–1920	Bradford City		
1920–1921	Arsenal	2	(1)
1921–??	Bradford City		

International career
1912	England Amateurs	3	(9)
- * Club domestic league appearances and goals

Olympic medal record

Men's football

Representing Great Britain
Gold medal – first place	1912 Stockholm	Team competition

Harold Adrian Walden (10 October 1887 – 2 December 1955) was an English amateur footballer who played for several clubs, Halifax Town, Bradford City and Arsenal. Walden also played for Great Britain's football team, with which he won gold in the 1912 Summer Olympics.

== Playing career ==
A centre forward, he began his career with Cliftonville and Linfield in Ireland, before joining Halifax Town in October 1911 and Bradford City two months later. He spent four seasons with the Bantams and was the League's top scorer in 1911–12. That summer, he was part of the English amateur team that represented Great Britain at the Olympic football tournament, playing a pivotal role in helping the team win the gold medal since he netted 9 goals in just three games, thus averaging three goals per game. Walden scored six goals in a 7–0 win over Schlosser's Hungary in the quarter-finals, followed by two goals in a 4–0 win over Finland in the semi-finals, and then netted a goal in the final against Denmark as Great Britain won 4–2, thus contributing decisively to his side's triumph in Stockholm. He holds the record of being the 'Highest British goal scorer within the Olympics' and is still the shared eighth highest goal scorer overall within the Olympics.

Walden entered the army by joining the Cheshire Regiment in April 1902 at the age of 14 and a half as a drummer boy and served in India and Ireland. He played for the Army against the Navy in 1910 and 1911, and also served in World War I, for the West Yorkshire Regiment, rising to the rank of captain. After the war ended he joined Arsenal and played six times for the Gunners, twice against Oldham Athletic scoring a single goal and in four friendlies, with his debut coming on 12 February 1921. With just those games to his name, he returned to Bradford at the end of the 1920–21 season.

== Personal life ==
After retiring from football and the army, he went into the music hall as a variety performer, touring England, Australia, China and India. He made his stage debut while still playing football, in 1919. He had also had a minor film career, which included starring in The Winning Goal, one of the earliest football-related films, in 1920. Walden also played himself in the 1948 film Cup-tie Honeymoon. He made 78 rpm records such as "Ronnie the Robin" together with "And only me knows why", on the Imperial label as well as from Ernest Binns' Arcadian Follies, 'Mother I'm a soldier' and 'Only me knows why' upon Parlophone. The latter was reviewed in The Gramophone magazine's November 1939 edition. He died in 1955 of a heart attack at Leeds railway station. He is buried at Killingbeck RC Cemetery, York Road, Leeds, Yorkshire.

=== International goals ===
England Amateurs score listed first, score column indicates score after each Walden goal.

List of international goals scored by Harold Walden
No.	Cap	Date	Venue	Opponent	Score	Result	Competition	Ref
1	1	30 June 1912	Stockholms Olympiastadion, Stockholm, Sweden	Hungary	1–0	7–0	1912 Summer Olympics Quarter-finals	
2	1	30 June 1912	Stockholms Olympiastadion, Stockholm, Sweden	Hungary	2–0	7–0	1912 Summer Olympics Quarter-finals	
3	1	30 June 1912	Stockholms Olympiastadion, Stockholm, Sweden	Hungary	4–0	7–0	1912 Summer Olympics Quarter-finals	
4	1	30 June 1912	Stockholms Olympiastadion, Stockholm, Sweden	Hungary	5–0	7–0	1912 Summer Olympics Quarter-finals	
5	1	30 June 1912	Stockholms Olympiastadion, Stockholm, Sweden	Hungary	6–0	7–0	1912 Summer Olympics Quarter-finals	
6	1	30 June 1912	Stockholms Olympiastadion, Stockholm, Sweden	Hungary	7–0	7–0	1912 Summer Olympics Quarter-finals	
7	2	2 July 1912	Stockholms Olympiastadion, Stockholm, Sweden	Finland	2–0	4–0	1912 Summer Olympics Semi-finals	
8	2	2 July 1912	Stockholms Olympiastadion, Stockholm, Sweden	Finland	3–0	4–0	1912 Summer Olympics Semi-finals	
9	3	4 July 1912	Stockholms Olympiastadion, Stockholm, Sweden	Denmark	1–0	4–2	1912 Summer Olympics Final	

== Honours ==
Great Britain

- Summer Olympics 1912: Gold Medal

=== Individual ===
- Silver Boot: 1912 Summer Olympics
