= Vilhelm Wolfhagen =

Danish footballer (1889–1958)

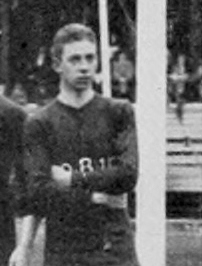
- Wolfhagen with Denmark at the 1912 Summer Olympics

Personal information
- Full name: Vilhelm Wolfhagen
- Date of birth: 11 November 1889
- Place of birth: Copenhagen, Denmark
- Date of death: 5 July 1958 (aged 68)
- Place of death: Frederikshavn, Denmark
- Position: Forward

Senior career*
Years	Team	Apps	(Gls)
1906–1918	Kjøbenhavns Boldklub		

International career
1908–1917	Denmark	18	(14)
Medal record
Men's Football
Silver medal – second place	1908 London	Team competition
Silver medal – second place	1912 Stockholm	Team competition
- * Club domestic league appearances and goals

Vilhelm "Wolle" Wolfhagen (11 November 1889 – 5 July 1958) was a Danish footballer who scored 14 goals in 18 games for the Denmark national team and won silver medals at the 1908 and 1912 Summer Olympics. He played his entire career with Kjøbenhavns Boldklub (KB), with whom he won several Danish football championships.

Wolfhagen took part in the first official Danish national team game, played at the 1908 Summer Olympics, as he scored four goals in the 9-0 victory against France B from his favoured position of forward. He scored another four goals in the second game of the 1908 Olympics, a 17–1 defeat of the France A team, the biggest ever win of the Denmark national team. In the final game of the tournament, Denmark lost 2–0 to Great Britain, thus winning silver medals. Four years later, Wolfhagen scored one goal in Denmark's three games at the 1912 Olympics, before they were once again defeated by Great Britain in the final. He ended his national team career in October 1917, having scored 14 goals in 18 national team games.

Wolfhagen was also a good bandy player. He played bandy for Fredriksberg Skøjteløberforening 1902–1922 and took part as a bandy player at the Nordic Games in 1909 and 1917.

Wolfhagen's profession was in the military. He raised to the rank of colonel in the artillery.

== See also ==
- List of footballers who achieved hat-trick records
