= Anthon Olsen =

Danish footballer (1889–1972)

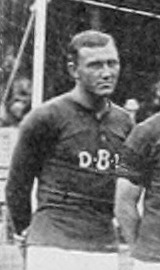
- Olsen with Denmark at the 1912 Summer Olympics

Personal information
- Full name: Ole Anthon Olsen
- Date of birth: 14 September 1889
- Place of birth: Copenhagen, Denmark
- Date of death: 17 March 1972 (aged 82)
- Place of death: Gentofte, Denmark
- Position: Forward

Youth career
- Hermod
- Freja
- Østerbros Boldklub
- B.93

Senior career*
Years	Team	Apps	(Gls)
1905–1928	B.93	227	(268)

International career
1912–1927	Denmark	16	(14)
Medal record
Men's Football
Silver medal – second place	1912 Stockholm	Team competition
- * Club domestic league appearances and goals

Ole Anthon Olsen (14 September 1889 – 17 March 1972) was a Danish amateur football player who played in the forward position and amateur cricket player. He scored 14 goals in 16 games for the Denmark national football team, and won a silver medal at the 1912 Summer Olympics.

Born in Copenhagen, Olsen played for a handful of Copenhagen clubs. While playing for B.93, he made his Danish national team debut. He was selected for the Danish squad at the 1912 Summer Olympics, playing all of Denmark's three games at the tournament. He scored seven goals in the tournament and was the Danish to score as the team won Olympic silver medals. After the 1912 Olympics, he scored six goals in five games until September 1915, making his Danish national team total 13 goals in eight games.

With B.93, he won the 1916 Danish football championship, scoring two goals in the championship final 3–2 win against KB. For the national team, he did not recover his impressive goal scoring form from his early years, and in his last eight national team games until October 1927, he scored one goal in eight games. He ended his national team career in 1927, having won his second Danish championship with B.93.

Olsen was the treasurer at B.93 between 1947 and 1957.

He was also a cricket player for B.93, reaching 150 matches.

== See also ==
- Dansk Boldspil-Union
- DBU Copenhagen
