= Sophus Nielsen =

Danish footballer and manager (1888–1963)

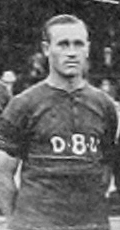
- Nielsen with Denmark at the 1912 Summer Olympics

Personal information
- Full name: Sophus Erhard Nielsen
- Date of birth: 15 March 1888
- Place of birth: Copenhagen, Denmark
- Date of death: 6 August 1963 (aged 75)
- Place of death: Copenhagen, Denmark
- Position: Forward

Youth career
- –1898: Concordia
- 1898–1902: Stjernen
- 1902–1904: BK Frem

Senior career*
Years	Team	Apps	(Gls)
1904–1912	BK Frem	30	(33)
1910–1911	Holstein Kiel		
1916–1921	BK Frem	107	(92)

International career
1908–1919	Denmark	20	(16)

Managerial career
- 1932–1933: Viborg FF
- 1933: Holstebro Boldklub
- 1940: Denmark
- * Club domestic league appearances and goals

Sophus Erhard "Krølben" Nielsen (15 March 1888 – 6 August 1963) was a Danish amateur football player and manager, and the first player in history to score ten goals in a full national team match. Nielsen scored a total 16 goals in 20 games for the Denmark national team, and won silver medals at the 1908 and 1912 Summer Olympics. He was named Denmark national team manager in 1940, and he was a pioneer in educating Danish coaches. His nickname Krølben (literally: curl-leg) is slang for him being bandy-legged.

== Club career ==
Born in Copenhagen, Sophus Nielsen started his senior career with local team Boldklubben Frem. He made his senior debut in October 1904. Nielsen played as centre forward and inside forward, and was a skilful player with tricky dribbles and shots, but also with a great heading ability. His bandy legs made it difficult for opponents to tackle the ball away from him. Sophus was the footballing idol of many Copenhagen youth players, including later Danish international team captain Pauli Jørgensen. With Frem, Sophus won the 1911 Baneklubberne Tournaments.

Having served his apprenticeship as a blacksmith with Burmeister & Wain, Sophus Nielsen and his unemployed carpenter brother Carl, decided to travel Europe as journeymen. However, the two brothers only made it as far as Kiel in Holstein. Here they met the chairman of the local football club Holstein Kiel, whom Sophus knew from an earlier trip with Frem. The chairman provided Sophus and Carl with jobs, as a master blacksmith and joiner respectively. In exchange, the brothers would agree to play amateur football for Holstein Kiel. Nielsen became quite the sensation among German football enthusiasts.

He later returned to Frem, where he played the remainder of his footballing career. His last game for Frem was in May 1921.

== International career ==
Nielsen was called up to the first official Denmark national team selection, for the 1908 Summer Olympics. Nielsen scored one goal in Denmark's first ever national team game, as the France B team was defeated 9–0. On 22 October 1908, Denmark played France A and the Danes won 17–1. Nielsen scored a record ten goals; in the 3rd, 4th, 6th, 39th, 46th, 48th, 52nd, 64th, 66th, and 76th minute. Denmark went on to win the silver medal after they were defeated 2–0 by Great Britain in the final.

Nielsen's record was matched in the 1912 Olympics, as Germany's Gottfried Fuchs scored ten in a 16–0 win against Russia. It was not broken until 2001, when Australia's Archie Thompson scored 13 goals in a 31–0 defeat of American Samoa.

Nielsen went on to win another silver medal at the 1912 Summer Olympics, in which he scored two goals in three games, thus totalizing 13 Olympic goals, making him the all-time top goal scorer in Olympic Football history alongside Hungary's Antal Dunai (Dunai scored six in 1968 and seven in 1972). While playing for Holstein Kiel, Nielsen still represented Frem in the Danish national team. Following the 1912 Olympics, Nielsen played another 12 international games, scoring four goals. He ended his national team career in October 1919.

== Coaching career ==
After his retirement, Sophus Nielsen coached the Frem youth team from 1924 to 1926, and he was a temporary coach in a number of Danish clubs, including Holstebro Boldklub in 1933. Sophus Nielsen was a member of the Denmark national team committee from 1927 to 1951, which selected the players for the national team. In 1940, Nielsen was named the first manager of the Denmark national team(as opposed to the temporary coaches of the past), and he also pioneered the education of Danish coaches. He made speeches and seminars around the country on coaching and training methods. Sophus Nielsen managed Denmark for two games, both draws with Sweden in October 1940.

As national team manager, he replaced temporary English coach Edward Magner, but Nielsen lacked the authority of Magner, in making the players comply with the physical training regime. His training was criticized as being too basic, by the young Knud Lundberg, who would later go on to captain the Danes at the 1948 Summer Olympics. However, Sophus Nielsen and Lundberg later became friends, and shared the same tactical outlook on the attacking game. Nielsen would have deployed the wingers in a more defensive role, while having two centre-forwards (anticipating the later 4–2–4 formation), but this was blocked by the rest of the Denmark national team committee.

== Career statistics ==
Scores and results list Denmark's goal tally first, score column indicates score after each Nielsen goal.

List of international goals scored by Sophus Nielsen
No.	Date	Venue	Opponent	Score	Result	Competition
1	19 October 1908	London, England	France B	9–0	9–0	1908 Olympics
2	22 October 1908	London, England	France A	1–0	17–1	1908 Olympics
3	22 October 1908	London, England	France A	2–0	17–1	1908 Olympics
4	22 October 1908	London, England	France A	3–0	17–1	1908 Olympics
5	22 October 1908	London, England	France A	6–1	17–1	1908 Olympics
6	22 October 1908	London, England	France A	7–1	17–1	1908 Olympics
7	22 October 1908	London, England	France A	8–1	17–1	1908 Olympics
8	22 October 1908	London, England	France A	9–1	17–1	1908 Olympics
9	22 October 1908	London, England	France A	11–1	17–1	1908 Olympics
10	22 October 1908	London, England	France A	12–1	17–1	1908 Olympics
11	22 October 1908	London, England	France A	15–1	17–1	1908 Olympics
12	30 June 1912	Stockholm, Sweden	Norway	6–0	7–0	1912 Olympics
13	30 June 1912	Stockholm, Sweden	Norway	7–0	7–0	1912 Olympics
14	17 May 1914	Copenhagen, Denmark	Netherlands	3–3	4–3	Friendly
15	5 June 1914	Copenhagen, Denmark	England Amateurs	2–0	3–0	Friendly
16	3 June 1917	Copenhagen, Denmark	Sweden	1–1	1–1	Friendly

== Honours ==
- 1911 Baneklubberne Tournaments
- 2014 (post mortem) Fodboldens Hall of Fame

Olympic medal record

Men's Football
Silver medal – second place	1908 London	Team competition
Silver medal – second place	1912 Stockholm	Team competition
