= FIFA World Cup records and statistics =

As of the 2026 edition, 84 national teams have competed at the finals of the men's FIFA World Cup. Brazil is the only team to have appeared in all 23 tournaments to date, with Germany having participated in 21, Argentina in 19, and Italy and Mexico both in 18. Eight nations have won the tournament. The inaugural winners in 1930 were Uruguay; the current champions are Spain. The most successful nation is Brazil, which has won the cup on five occasions. Five teams have appeared in FIFA World Cup finals without winning, while twelve more have appeared in the semi-finals.

== General performances ==
=== List of tournaments ===
Year	Host	Champions	Winning coach	Most goals	Most assists	Best player award	Source
1930	Uruguay	Uruguay	(Uruguay) Alberto Suppici	(Argentina) Guillermo Stábile (8)	(Argentina) Manuel Ferreira (4)	Not awarded	
1934	Italy	Italy	(Italy) Vittorio Pozzo	(Czechoslovakia) Oldřich Nejedlý (5)	(Italy) Giovanni Ferrari (4)	Not awarded	
1938	France	Italy	(Italy) Vittorio Pozzo	(Brazil) Leônidas (7)	(Hungary) Ferenc Sas (5)	Not awarded	
1950	Brazil	Uruguay	(Uruguay) Juan López	(Brazil) Ademir (9)	(Brazil) Ademir (6)	Not awarded	
1954	Switzerland	West Germany	(West Germany) Sepp Herberger	(Hungary) Sándor Kocsis (11)	(West Germany) Fritz Walter (7)	Not awarded	
1958	Sweden	Brazil	(Brazil) Vicente Feola	(France) Just Fontaine (13)	(France) Raymond Kopa (8)	Not awarded	
1962	Chile	Brazil	(Brazil) Aymoré Moreira	Six players (4) (Note: Garrincha, Vavá, Leonel Sánchez, Flórián Albert, Valentin Ivanov and Dražan Jerković)	(Brazil) Mário Zagallo (5)	Not awarded	
1966	England	England	(England) Alf Ramsey	(Portugal) Eusébio (9)	(West Germany) Sigfried Held (4)	Not awarded	
1970	Mexico	Brazil	(Brazil) Mário Zagallo	(West Germany) Gerd Müller (10)	(Brazil) Pelé (6)	Not awarded	
1974	West Germany	West Germany	(West Germany) Helmut Schön	(Poland) Grzegorz Lato (7)	(Poland) Robert Gadocha (5)	Not awarded	
1978	Argentina	Argentina	(Argentina) César Luis Menotti	(Argentina) Mario Kempes (6)	(Argentina) Daniel Bertoni (3) (Netherlands) Rob Rensenbrink (3) (Netherlands) René van de Kerkhof (3)	(Argentina) Mario Kempes	
1982	Spain	Italy	(Italy) Enzo Bearzot	(Italy) Paolo Rossi (6)	(West Germany) Pierre Littbarski (5)	(Italy) Paolo Rossi	
1986	Mexico	Argentina	(Argentina) Carlos Bilardo	(England) Gary Lineker (6)	(Argentina) Diego Maradona (5)	(Argentina) Diego Maradona	
1990	Italy	West Germany	(West Germany) Franz Beckenbauer	(Italy) Salvatore Schillaci (6)	(Italy) Giuseppe Giannini (3) (Czechoslovakia) Ľubomír Moravčík (3) (Czechoslovakia) Jozef Chovanec (3)	(Italy) Salvatore Schillaci	
1994	United States	Brazil	(Brazil) Carlos Alberto Parreira	(Bulgaria) Hristo Stoichkov (6) (Russia) Oleg Salenko (6)	(Germany) Thomas Häßler (5)	(Brazil) Romário	
1998	France	France	(France) Aimé Jacquet	(Croatia) Davor Šuker (6)	Seven players (3) (Note: Juan Sebastián Verón, Wim Jonk, Brian Laudrup, Tahar El Khalej, Dennis Bergkamp, Ronaldo and Youri Djorkaeff)	(Brazil) Ronaldo	
2002	South Korea; Japan	Brazil	(Brazil) Luiz Felipe Scolari	(Brazil) Ronaldo (8)	(Germany) Michael Ballack (4)	(Germany) Oliver Kahn	
2006	Germany	Italy	(Italy) Marcello Lippi	(Germany) Miroslav Klose (5)	(Italy) Francesco Totti (4) (Argentina) Juan Román Riquelme (4)	(France) Zinedine Zidane	
2010	South Africa	Spain	(Spain) Vicente del Bosque	Four players (5) (Note: Thomas Müller, Wesley Sneijder, David Villa and Diego Forlán)	Five players (3) (Note: Thomas Müller, Bastian Schweinsteiger, Mesut Özil, Kaká and Dirk Kuyt)	(Uruguay) Diego Forlán	
2014	Brazil	Germany	(Germany) Joachim Löw	(Colombia) James Rodríguez (6)	(Colombia) Juan Cuadrado (4)	(Argentina) Lionel Messi	
2018	Russia	France	(France) Didier Deschamps	(England) Harry Kane (6)	Sixteen players (2) (Note: Eden Hazard, Lionel Messi, Wahbi Khazri, Philippe Coutinho, Antoine Griezmann, Aleksandr Golovin, Kevin De Bruyne, Thomas Meunier, Juan Fernando Quintero, Artem Dzyuba, Éver Banega, Viktor Claesson, Carlos Sánchez, James Rodríguez, Youri Tielemans and Lucas Hernandez)	(Croatia) Luka Modrić	
2022	Qatar	Argentina	(Argentina) Lionel Scaloni	(France) Kylian Mbappé (8)	Five players (3) (Note: Bruno Fernandes, Lionel Messi, Antoine Griezmann, Harry Kane and Ivan Perišić)	(Argentina) Lionel Messi	
2026	Canada; Mexico; United States	Spain	(Spain) Luis de la Fuente	(France) Kylian Mbappé (10)	(France) Michael Olise (7)	(Spain) Rodri	
2030	Spain; Portugal; Morocco	TBD	TBD	TBD	TBD	TBD	

=== Overall team records ===
The system used in the World Cup up to 1990 was 2 points for a win. In this ranking 3 points are awarded for a win, 1 for a draw, and 0 for a loss. Per statistical convention in football, matches decided in extra time are counted as wins and losses, while matches decided by penalty shoot-outs are counted as draws. Teams are ranked by total points, then by goal difference, then by goals scored, then by number of participations.

As of 2026 FIFA World Cup

Rank	Team	Part.	Pld	W	D	L	GF	GA	GD	Pts	PPG
1	Brazil	23	119	79	20	20	247	112	+135	257	2.16
2	Germany (Note: Germany, officially the Federal Republic of Germany since 1949, has been represented by the same governing body, the Deutscher Fußball-Bund (DFB), since 1904. Following World War II and the division of Germany, the DFB was re-admitted to FIFA after the 1950 World Cup as West Germany. Saar competed in the 1954 World Cup qualifying before joining West Germany in 1956. East Germany fielded teams of their own from 1958 to 1990 before joining with West Germany and the DFB during the German reunification. FIFA officially attributes all international results of the DFB team since 1908 to Germany, including the results of West Germany from 1954–1990.)	21	116	70	22	24	243	135	+108	232	2.00
3	Argentina	19	96	54	17	25	171	109	+62	179	1.86
4	Italy	18	83	45	21	17	128	77	+51	156	1.88
5	France	17	81	45	14	22	156	95	+61	149	1.84
6	England	17	82	38	23	21	124	80	+44	137	1.67
7	Spain	17	75	38	18	19	122	76	+46	132	1.76
8	Netherlands	12	59	32	16	11	107	57	+50	112	1.90
9	Uruguay	15	62	25	15	22	92	80	+12	90	1.45
10	Belgium	15	57	24	12	21	83	81	+2	84	1.47
11	Mexico	18	65	21	15	29	72	104	−32	78	1.20
12	Sweden	13	55	20	14	21	87	83	+4	74	1.35
13	Russia (Note: The Soviet Union qualified seven times prior to its dissolution in 1991. The 15 former nations Soviet republics now compete separately. FIFA considers Russia as the successor team of the Soviet Union. Russia and Ukraine qualified for the World Cup for the first time as separate nations in 1994 and 2006 respectively, with Uzbekistan doing the same in 2026.)	11	45	19	10	16	77	54	+23	67	1.49
14	Portugal	9	40	19	8	13	69	44	+25	65	1.63
15	Serbia (Note: The Yugoslavia national football team qualified eight times during eras of Kingdom of Yugoslavia (1930) and the Socialist Federal Republic of Yugoslavia (1950–1990). They qualified from 1930–1990 under the name Yugoslavia before its breakup in 1992 by the secession of many of its constituent republics. They qualified once in 1998 as the Federal Republic of Yugoslavia, then changed its name to Serbia and Montenegro in 2003, only qualifying under that name in 2006. All of these teams are considered the predecessors of the current Serbia team by FIFA, which first qualified under that name in 2010. The other national teams that resulted from the breakup of the SFR Yugoslavia in 1992 — Croatia, Slovenia, Bosnia and Herzegovina, and North Macedonia — are considered distinct entities from the Yugoslavia team of 1930–1990. Montenegro now also competes separately after independence in 2006 and Kosovo was recognized by FIFA in 2016.)	13	49	18	9	22	71	71	0	63	1.29
16	Switzerland	13	47	17	10	20	65	79	−14	61	1.30
17	Poland	9	38	17	6	15	49	50	−1	57	1.50
18	Croatia	7	34	15	8	11	49	40	+9	53	1.56
19	Hungary	9	32	15	3	14	87	57	+30	48	1.50
20	Austria	8	33	13	5	15	49	56	−7	44	1.45
21	United States	12	42	12	8	22	51	74	−23	44	1.05
22	Slovakia (Note: Czechoslovakia qualified eight times prior to being divided into Slovakia and the Czech Republic in 1993. FIFA considers both the Czech Republic and Slovakia the successor team of Czechoslovakia. The Czech Republic national team qualified for the World Cup for the first time as a separate nation in 2006, with Slovakia doing the same in 2010.)	9	34	12	6	16	49	52	−3	42	1.24
23	Czech Republic	10	36	12	6	18	49	55	−6	42	1.17
24	Colombia	7	27	12	5	10	37	31	+6	41	1.52
25	Chile	9	33	11	7	15	40	49	−9	40	1.21
26	Paraguay	9	32	8	12	12	33	44	−11	36	1.13
27	South Korea	12	41	8	10	23	41	81	−40	34	0.83
28	Denmark	6	23	9	6	8	31	29	+2	33	1.43
29	Morocco	7	29	8	9	12	30	33	−3	33	1.14
30	Japan	8	29	8	8	13	33	38	−5	32	1.10
31	Romania	7	21	8	5	8	30	32	−2	29	1.38
32	Costa Rica	6	21	6	5	10	22	39	−17	23	1.10
33	Cameroon	8	26	5	8	13	22	47	−25	23	0.88
34	Ghana	5	19	6	4	9	20	26	−6	22	1.16
35	Scotland	9	26	5	7	14	26	45	−19	22	0.85
36	Norway	4	14	6	3	5	20	19	+1	21	1.50
37	Senegal	4	16	6	3	7	26	26	0	21	1.31
38	Ecuador	5	17	6	3	8	16	18	−2	21	1.24
39	Nigeria	6	21	6	3	12	23	30	−7	21	1.00
40	Australia	7	24	5	6	13	20	40	−20	21	0.88
41	Turkey	3	13	6	1	6	23	22	+1	19	1.46
42	Peru	5	18	5	3	10	21	33	−12	18	1.00
43	Bulgaria	7	26	3	8	15	22	53	−31	17	0.65
44	Ivory Coast	4	13	5	1	7	18	18	0	16	1.23
45	Algeria	5	17	4	4	9	18	28	−10	16	0.94
46	Iran	7	21	3	7	11	16	34	−18	16	0.76
47	Saudi Arabia	7	22	4	4	14	15	49	−34	16	0.73
48	Republic of Ireland	3	13	2	8	3	10	10	0	14	1.08
49	South Africa	4	13	3	5	5	13	20	−7	14	1.08
50	Northern Ireland	3	13	3	5	5	13	23	−10	14	1.08
51	Tunisia	7	21	3	5	13	16	38	−22	14	0.67
52	East Germany	1	6	2	2	2	5	5	0	8	1.33
53	Egypt	4	12	1	5	6	13	19	−6	8	0.67
54	Greece	3	10	2	2	6	5	20	−15	8	0.80
55	Ukraine	1	5	2	1	2	5	7	−2	7	1.40
56	Bosnia and Herzegovina	2	7	2	1	4	9	12	−3	7	1.00
57	Wales	2	8	1	4	3	5	10	−5	7	0.88
58	Canada	3	11	2	1	8	11	18	−7	7	0.64
59	Slovenia	2	6	1	1	4	5	10	−5	4	0.67
60	Cuba	1	3	1	1	1	5	12	−7	4	1.33
61	DR Congo (Note: The Democratic Republic of the Congo competed as Zaire in 1974.)	2	7	1	1	5	5	19	−14	4	0.57
62	North Korea	2	7	1	1	5	6	21	−15	4	0.57
63	New Zealand	3	9	0	4	5	8	24	−16	4	0.44
64	Cape Verde	1	4	0	3	1	4	5	−1	3	0.75
65	Jamaica	1	3	1	0	2	3	9	−6	3	1.00
66	Honduras	3	9	0	3	6	3	14	−11	3	0.33
67	Angola	1	3	0	2	1	1	2	−1	2	0.67
68	Israel	1	3	0	2	1	1	3	−2	2	0.67
69	Iceland	1	3	0	1	2	2	5	−3	1	0.33
70	Kuwait	1	3	0	1	2	2	6	−4	1	0.33
71	Trinidad and Tobago	1	3	0	1	2	0	4	−4	1	0.33
72	Curaçao	1	3	0	1	2	1	9	−8	1	0.33
73	Qatar	2	6	0	1	5	3	17	−14	1	0.17
74	Bolivia	3	6	0	1	5	1	20	−19	1	0.17
75	Jordan	1	3	0	0	3	3	8	−5	0	0.00
76	Togo	1	3	0	0	3	1	6	−5	0	0.00
77	Indonesia (Note: Indonesia competed as the Dutch East Indies in 1938.)	1	1	0	0	1	0	6	−6	0	0.00
78	United Arab Emirates	1	3	0	0	3	2	11	−9	0	0.00
78	Uzbekistan	1	3	0	0	3	2	11	−9	0	0.00
80	China	1	3	0	0	3	0	9	−9	0	0.00
81	Panama	2	6	0	0	6	2	15	−13	0	0.00
82	Iraq	2	6	0	0	6	2	16	−14	0	0.00
83	Haiti	2	6	0	0	6	4	22	−18	0	0.00
84	El Salvador	2	6	0	0	6	1	22	−21	0	0.00

Breakdown of successor team records

Team	Part	Pld	W	D	L	GF	GA	GD	Pts
Czechoslovakia (1934–1990)	8	30	11	5	14	44	45	−1	38
Czech Republic (2006–present)	2	6	1	1	4	5	10	−5	4
Slovakia (2010–present)	1	4	1	1	2	5	7	−2	4

Team	Part	Pld	W	D	L	GF	GA	GD	Pts
Germany (1934–1938)	2	6	3	1	2	14	13	+1	10
West Germany (1950–1990)	10	62	36	14	12	131	77	+54	122
Germany (1994–present)	9	48	31	7	10	98	45	+53	100

Team	Part	Pld	W	D	L	GF	GA	GD	Pts
Soviet Union (1958–1990)	7	31	15	6	10	53	34	+19	51
Russia (1994–present)	4	14	4	4	6	24	20	+4	16

Team	Part	Pld	W	D	L	GF	GA	GD	Pts
(Kingdom of Yugoslavia) Yugoslavia (1930–1990)	8	33	14	7	12	55	42	+13	49
FR Yugoslavia (1998)	1	4	2	1	1	5	4	+1	7
Serbia and Montenegro (2006)	1	3	0	0	3	2	10	−8	0
Serbia (2010–present)	3	9	2	1	6	9	15	−6	7

Team	Part	Pld	W	D	L	GF	GA	GD	Pts
Zaire (1974)	1	3	0	0	3	0	14	−14	0
DR Congo (2026–present)	1	4	1	1	2	5	5	0	4

=== All-time medal table ===
Team	Titles	Runners-up	Third place	Fourth place	Top 4 total
Brazil	5 (1958, 1962, 1970, 1994, 2002)	2 (1950*, 1998)	2 (1938, 1978)	2 (1974, 2014*)	11
Germany^{1}	4 (1954, 1974*, 1990, 2014)	4 (1966, 1982, 1986, 2002)	4 (1934, 1970, 2006*, 2010)	1 (1958)	13
Italy	4 (1934*, 1938, 1982, 2006)	2 (1970, 1994)	1 (1990*)	1 (1978)	8
Argentina	3 (1978*, 1986, 2022)	4 (1930, 1990, 2014, 2026)			7
France	2 (1998*, 2018)	2 (2006, 2022)	2 (1958, 1986)	2 (1982, 2026)	8
Uruguay	2 (1930*, 1950)			3 (1954, 1970, 2010)	5
Spain	2 (2010, 2026)			1 (1950)	3
England	1 (1966*)		1 (2026)	2 (1990, 2018)	4
Netherlands		3 (1974, 1978, 2010)	1 (2014)	1 (1998)	5
Hungary		2 (1938, 1954)			2
Czech Republic^{2}		2 (1934, 1962)			2
Slovakia^{2}		2 (1934, 1962)			2
Sweden		1 (1958*)	2 (1950, 1994)	1 (1938)	4
Croatia		1 (2018)	2 (1998, 2022)		3
Poland			2 (1974, 1982)		2
Austria			1 (1954)	1 (1934)	2
Portugal			1 (1966)	1 (2006)	2
Belgium			1 (2018)	1 (1986)	2
United States			1 (1930)		1
Chile			1 (1962*)		1
Turkey			1 (2002)		1
Serbia^{3}				2 (1930, 1962)	2
Russia^{4}				1 (1966)	1
Bulgaria				1 (1994)	1
South Korea				1 (2002*)	1
Morocco				1 (2022)	1

* hosts
^{1} includes results representing West Germany (1954–1990)
^{2} includes results representing Czechoslovakia (1934–1990)
^{3} includes results representing Yugoslavia (1930–1990) and FR Yugoslavia / Serbia and Montenegro (1998–2006)
^{4} includes results representing the Soviet Union (1958–1990) - results achieved by the Soviet Union national football team prior to the dissolution of the Soviet Union in 1991. These results belong to the Soviet Union and are not attributable to the Russian Soviet Federative Socialist Republic, Russia or Russian Federation.

== Teams ==
Note: In case there are teams with equal quantities, they will be mentioned in chronological order of tournament history (the teams that attained the quantity first, are listed first). If the quantity was attained by more than one team in the same tournament, the teams will be listed alphabetically.

For a detailed list of top four appearances, see FIFA World Cup results.

=== Titles ===
- Most titles: **5** – Brazil (1958, 1962, 1970, 1994, 2002)
- Most consecutive titles: **2**
  - Italy (1934–1938)
  - Brazil (1958–1962)
- Longest gap between successive titles: **44 years** – Italy (nine editions, 1938–1982) (Note: Uruguay (80 years) and England (64 years) have longer active streaks.)
- Worst finish by defending champions: **Group stage**
  - Italy (1950)
  - Brazil (1966)
  - France (2002)
  - Italy (2010)
  - Spain (2014)
  - Germany (2018)
- Most titles won as host: **1** (Note: No national team has won the title more than once as host.)
  - Uruguay (1930)
  - Italy (1934)
  - England (1966)
  - West Germany (1974)
  - Argentina (1978)
  - France (1998)

=== Appearances ===
- Most World Cup appearances: **23** – Brazil, 1930–2026 (every tournament)
- Most appearances in the final: **8** – Germany, 1954, 1966, 1974, 1982, 1986 and 1990 as West Germany, 2002 and 2014 as Germany
- Most runners-up: **4**
  - Germany, 1966, 1982, 1986 as West Germany, 2002 as Germany
  - Argentina, 1930, 1990, 2014, 2026
- Most runners-up without winning a title: **3** – Netherlands, 1974, 1978, 2010
- Most consecutive appearances in the final: **3**
  - West Germany, 1982–1990
  - Brazil, 1994–2002
- Longest gap between successive appearances in the final: **48 years** – Argentina, 10 editions, 1930–1978
- Longest gap between successive appearances at the FIFA World Cup: **64 years** – Wales, 16 editions, 1958–2022
- Most appearances without winning a title: **18** – Mexico
- Most appearances without advancing to the second round: **9** – Scotland
- Most failed qualification attempts from nations who previously won the World Cup: **6** – Uruguay, 1958, 1978, 1982, 1994, 1998, 2006
- Most consecutive failed qualification attempts: **22** – Luxembourg, 1934–2026
- Most consecutive failed qualification attempts from nations who previously won the World Cup: **3** – Italy, 2018–2026

=== Goals ===
==== Highest scoring matches ====
Most goals scored in a match
Rank	Date	Venue	Total goals	Team	Score	Team
1	26 June 1954	Stade Olympique de la Pontaise, Lausanne	12	Austria	7–5	Switzerland
2	5 June 1938	Stade de la Meinau, Strasbourg	11	Brazil	6–5	Poland
2	20 June 1954	St. Jakob Stadium, Basel	11	Hungary	8–3	West Germany
2	15 June 1982	Nuevo Estadio, Elche	11	Hungary	10–1	El Salvador
5	8 June 1958	Idrottsparken, Norrköping	10	France	7–3	Paraguay
5	18 July 2026	Hard Rock Stadium, Miami Gardens	10	England	6–4	France

==== Highest scoring draws ====
Highest scoring matches drawn
Rank	Date	Venue	Team	Score	Team
1	17 June 1954	St. Jakob Stadium, Basel	England	4–4	Belgium
1	3 June 1962	Estadio Carlos Dittborn, Arica	Soviet Union	4–4	Colombia

==== Teams ====
- Most goals scored overall: **247** – Brazil, 1930–2026
- Most goals scored in a tournament: **27** – Hungary, 1954 (Note: in 5 games (5,4 goals/game))
- Most goals scored in a tournament by eventual winners: **25** – Germany, 1954 (Note: in 6 matches played (4,16 goals/games))
- Fewest goals scored overall: **0** – Indonesia (1938) (Note: in one game played for its only appearance under the name Dutch West Indies), China (2002) (Note: in three games played for its only appearance) and Trinidad and Tobago (2006) (Note: in three games played for its only appearance)
- Fewest goals scored in a tournament by eventual champions: **8** – Spain, 2010 (Note: in 8 matches played (1 goal/game))
- Most goals conceded overall: **135** – Germany (1934–2026) (Note: in 116 games (1,16 goal/game))
- Most goals conceded in a tournament: **16** – South Korea, 1954 (Note: in 2 matches played (8 goals/match))
- Most goals conceded in a tournament by eventual champions: **14** – Germany, (1954) (Note: in 6 games (2,33 goal/game))
- Fewest goals conceded overall: **2** – Angola, 2006 (Note: in 3 matches played for its only appearance (0.67 goals/match))
- Fewest goals conceded in a tournament: **0** – Switzerland, 2006 (Note: in 4 matches played (eliminated via penalty shoot-out))
- Fewest goals conceded in a tournament by eventual champions: **1** – Spain, 2026 (Note: in 8 matches played (0.13 goals/match))

==== Tournament ====
- Most goals scored in a tournament: **308** – 2026
- Fewest goals scored in a tournament: **70** – 1930, 1934
- Most goals per match in a tournament: **5.38** – 1954
- Fewest goals per match in a tournament: **2.21** – 1990

==== By tournament ====
Key
†	Denotes the highest goalscoring-related record

Year	Matches	Goals	Average goals	Top scorers	Goals scored
1930	18	70	3.89	Argentina	18
1934	17	70	4.12	**Italy**	12
1938	18	84	4.67	Hungary	15
1950	22	88	4.00	Brazil	22
1954	26	140	5.38^{†}	Hungary	27^{†}
1958	35	126	3.60	France	23
1962	32	89	2.78	**Brazil**	14
1966	32	89	2.78	Portugal	17
1970	32	95	2.97	**Brazil**	19
1974	38	97	2.55	Poland	16
1978	38	102	2.68	**Argentina**	15
1978	38	102	2.68	Netherlands	15
1982	52	146	2.81	France	16
1986	52	132	2.54	**Argentina**	14
1990	52	115	2.21	**West Germany**	15
1994	52	141	2.71	Sweden	15
1998	64	171	2.67	**France**	15
2002	64	161	2.52	**Brazil**	18
2006	64	147	2.30	Germany	14
2010	64	145	2.27	Germany	16
2014	64	171	2.67	**Germany**	18
2018	64	169	2.64	Belgium	16
2022	64	172	2.69	France	16
2026	104	308^{†}	2.96	England	20
2026	104	308^{†}	2.96	France	20

Teams listed in bold won the tournament. Fewer than half of all World Cup tournaments have been won by the highest-scoring team.

=== Matches results ===
==== Biggest wins ====
Biggest margin of victory
Rank	Date	Venue	Winning team	Score	Losing team
1	15 June 1982	Nuevo Estadio, Elche	Hungary	10–1	El Salvador
1	17 June 1954	Hardturm Stadium, Zürich	Hungary	9–0	South Korea
1	18 June 1974	Parkstadion, Gelsenkirchen	Yugoslavia	9–0	Zaire
4	12 June 1938	Stade du Fort Carré, Antibes	Sweden	8–0	Cuba
4	2 July 1950	Estádio Independência, Belo Horizonte	Uruguay	8–0	Bolivia
4	1 June 2002	Sapporo Dome, Sapporo	Germany	8–0	Saudi Arabia

==== Biggest win in a final ====
Biggest margin of victory in a final
Rank	Date	Venue	Winning team	Score	Losing team
1	29 June 1958	Råsunda Stadium, Solna	Brazil	5–2	Sweden
1	21 June 1970	Estadio Azteca, Mexico City	Brazil	4–1	Italy
1	12 July 1998	Stade de France, Saint-Denis	France	3–0	Brazil

=== Scores ===
- The most common score in a regular World Cup match is 1–0. (Note: Accurate as of 9 July 2026)
- The most common outcomes of a World Cup final are 4–2 and 1–0, inclusive extra time.

=== Streaks ===
- Longest winning streak: **11** – Brazil, 2002–2006
- Longest unbeaten streak: **16** – Netherlands, 2014–2026
- Longest unbeaten streak in 90 minutes: **23** – Netherlands, 2010–2026
- Longest losing streak: **9** – Mexico, 1930–1958
- Longest winless streak: **17** – Bulgaria, 1962–1994
- Longest drawn streak: **5** – Belgium, 1998–2002
- Longest streak without draw: **17** – West Germany, 1966–1974
- Longest streak scoring at least 1 goal: **18**
  - Brazil, 1930–1958
  - West Germany, 1934–1962
  - Germany, 1986–1998
- Longest goalless streak: **5**
  - Bolivia, 1930–1994
  - Honduras, 1982–2014
  - Algeria, 1986–2010
- Longest goalless streak by minutes: **517 minutes** – Bolivia, 1930–1994
- Longest clean sheet streak: **6** – Spain, 2022–2026
- Longest streak without conceding a goal by minutes: **650 minutes** – Spain, 2022–2026
- Longest streak without clean sheet: **22** – Switzerland, 1934–1994

=== Discipline ===
- Most red cards (tournament): **28** – 2006, in 64 matches
- Most red cards (all-time, team): **11** – Argentina, Brazil
- Most red cards (match, both teams): **4** – 2 each for Portugal and Netherlands, 2006 (Note: Also known as Battle of Nuremberg.)
- Most red cards (final match): **2** – Argentina v West Germany, 1990 (Note: The players sent off were Pedro Monzón and Gustavo Dezotti.)
- Most yellow cards (tournament): **345** – 2006, in 64 matches
- Most yellow cards (match, one team): **10** – Argentina v Netherlands, 2022
- Most yellow cards (match, both teams): **18** – 8 for Netherlands and 10 for Argentina, 2022
- Most yellow cards (final match, both teams): **14** – 9 for Netherlands and 5 for Spain, 2010
- Longest streak without a red card: **42** – Spain, 1994–2026
- Longest active streak without a red card since first appearance: **29** – Japan, 1998–2026
- Longest streak without a red card since first appearance that has ended: **35** – France, 1930–1998

=== Own goals ===
For a detailed list of own goals records and statistics, see the main article.

- Most own goals by a team: **4**
  - Mexico (1930, 1954, 1970, 2018)
  - Morocco (1998, 2018, 2022, 2026)
- Most own goals in favour of a team: **6** – France (1954, 1998, 2014 (x2), 2018 (x2))
- Most matches, never scoring an own goal: **81** – France (1930–2026)
- Most matches, never benefiting from an own goal: **65** – Mexico (1930–2026)
- Most matches, never scoring or benefiting from an own goal: **29** – Japan (1998–2026)

=== Penalty shoot-outs ===
- Most played: **7** – Argentina (1990 (x2), 1998, 2006, 2014, 2022 (x2))
- Most won: **6** – Argentina (1990 (x2), 1998, 2014, 2022 (x2))
- Most lost: **4**
  - Spain (1986, 2002, 2018, 2022)
  - Netherlands (1998, 2014, 2022, 2026)
- Most won without ever losing: **4** – Croatia (2018 (x2), 2022 (x2))
- Most lost without ever winning: **2**
  - Mexico (1986, 1994)
  - Romania (1990, 1994)
  - Japan (2010, 2022)
  - Colombia (2018, 2026)
- Most consecutive wins: **4**
  - Germany (1982, 1986, 1990, 2006)
  - Croatia (2018 (x2), 2022 (x2))
- Most consecutive losses: **3**
  - Italy (1990, 1994, 1998)
  - England (1990, 1998, 2006)
  - Spain (2002, 2018, 2022)
  - Netherlands (2014, 2022, 2026)

== Players ==
=== Titles ===
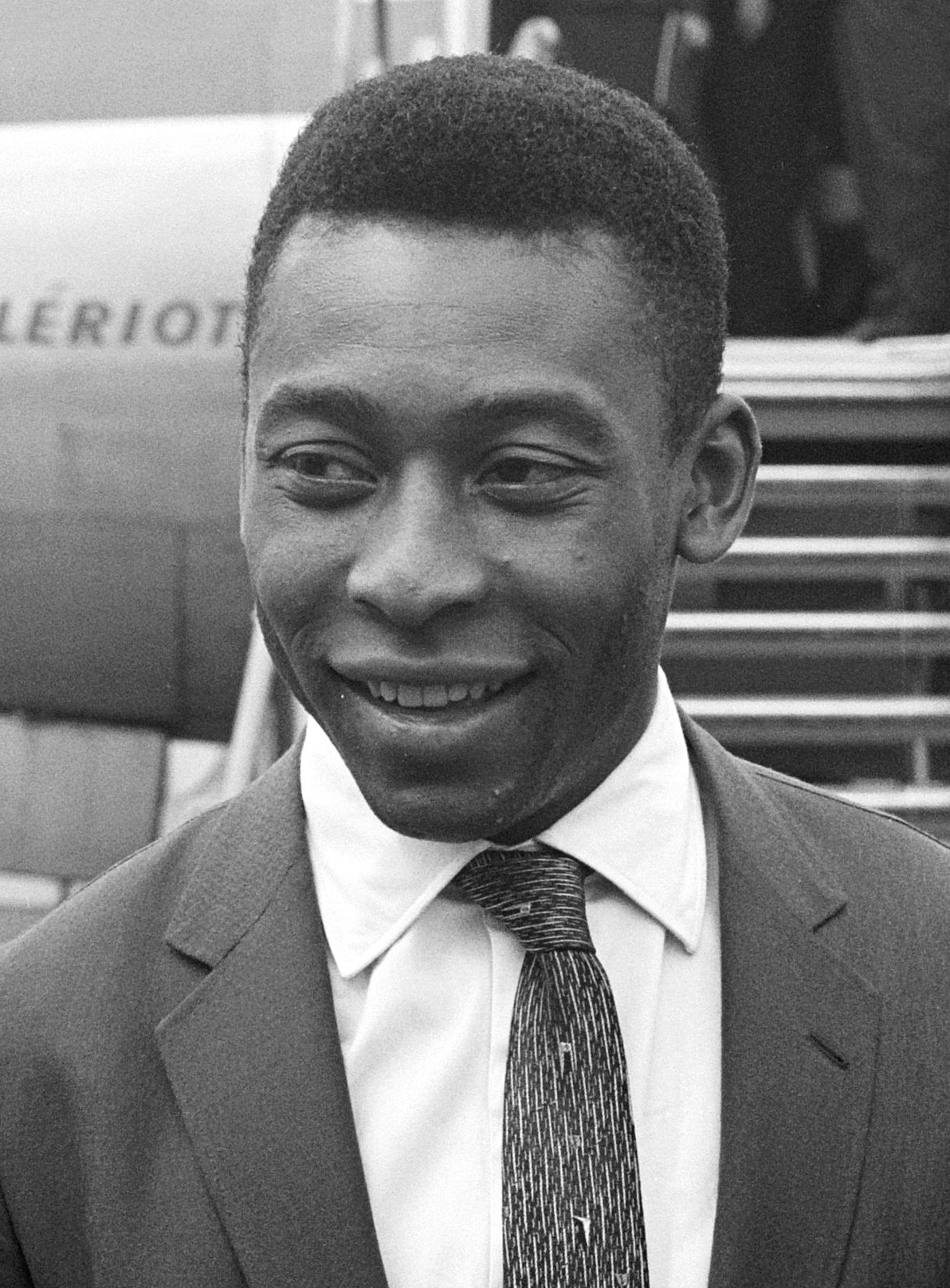
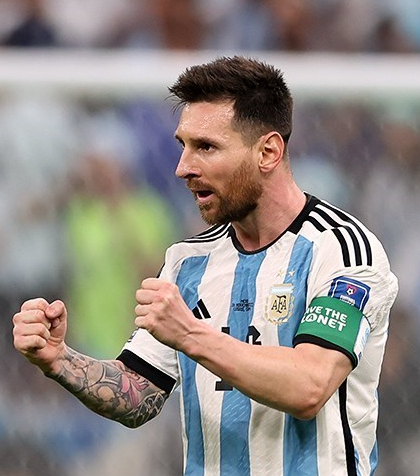
Left: Pelé, the only player to have won the FIFA World Cup three times.
Right: Lionel Messi holds the record for the most matches played, with 34 appearances.
- Most titles: 3 – Pelé for Brazil, 1958, 1962, (Note: Only played in the first two matches due to injury; medal awarded retroactively by FIFA in 2007.) 1970
- Most appearances in a final: 3 (Note: Pelé, Lothar Matthäus, Pierre Littbarski and Ronaldo each appeared three times in the squads of the teams that reached the finals, but none of them played in all three matches.)
  - Cafu for Brazil, 1994–2002
  - Lionel Messi for Argentina, 2014, 2022, 2026
- Youngest player to win the tournament: 17 years, 249 days – Pelé for Brazil, 1958
- Oldest player to win the tournament: 40 years, 133 days – Dino Zoff for Italy, 1982

=== Appearances ===
==== Most appearances ====
- Most matches played: 34 – (Argentina) Lionel Messi, 2006–2026
- Most matches played as a substitute: 12 – (England) Marcus Rashford, 2018–2026
- Most tournaments played: 6
  - (Portugal) Cristiano Ronaldo, 2006–2026
  - (Argentina) Lionel Messi, 2006–2026
- Most tournaments nominated as part of squad: 6
  - (Portugal) Cristiano Ronaldo (2006–2026)
  - (Argentina) Lionel Messi (2006–2026)
  - (Mexico) Guillermo Ochoa (2006–2026)

==== Oldest and youngest ====
- Youngest player: 17 years, 41 days – Norman Whiteside for Northern Ireland v Yugoslavia, 17 June 1982
- Youngest player in a final: 17 years, 249 days – Pelé for Brazil v Sweden, 29 June 1958
- Oldest player: 45 years, 161 days – Essam El-Hadary for Egypt v Saudi Arabia, 25 June 2018
- Oldest player in a knockout stage match: 41 years, 151 days – Cristiano Ronaldo for Portugal v Spain, 6 July 2026
- Oldest player in a final: 40 years, 133 days – Dino Zoff for Italy v West Germany, 11 July 1982
- Oldest-living player: 99 years, 210 days – (Mexico) Enrique Sesma, 1958
- Oldest-living winner: 91 years, 266 days – (Brazil) Pepe, 1958 and 1962
- Longest-lived player: 100 years, 241 days – (France) René Llense, 1934 and 1938
- Longest-lived winner: 95 years, 304 days – (Uruguay) Aníbal Paz, 1950

==== Matches results ====
- Most matches won: 23 – (Argentina) Lionel Messi, 2006–2026
- Most matches lost: 8
  - (Mexico) Antonio Carbajal, 1950–1962
  - (South Korea) Hong Myung-bo, 1990–2002
  - (South Korea) Son Heung-min, 2014–2026
  - (Australia) Mathew Leckie, 2014–2026
  - (Portugal) Cristiano Ronaldo, 2006–2026
- Most matches drawn: 8
  - (Republic of Ireland) Steve Staunton, 1990–2002
  - (Croatia) Luka Modrić, 2006–2026
  - (Portugal) Cristiano Ronaldo, 2006–2026
- Most matches, all won: 7 – (Brazil) Marcos, 2002
- Most matches, all lost: 6
  - (Panama) Yoel Bárcenas, 2018 and 2026
  - (Panama) José Luis Rodríguez, 2018 and 2026
- Most matches, never lost: 12
  - (Brazil) Mário Zagallo, 1958–1962
  - (Argentina) Julio Olarticoechea, 1986–1990
  - (Netherlands) Daley Blind, 2014–2022
  - (Netherlands) Memphis Depay, 2014–2026
- Most matches, never won: 9 – (Bulgaria) Dimitar Penev, 1966–1974

=== Goals ===
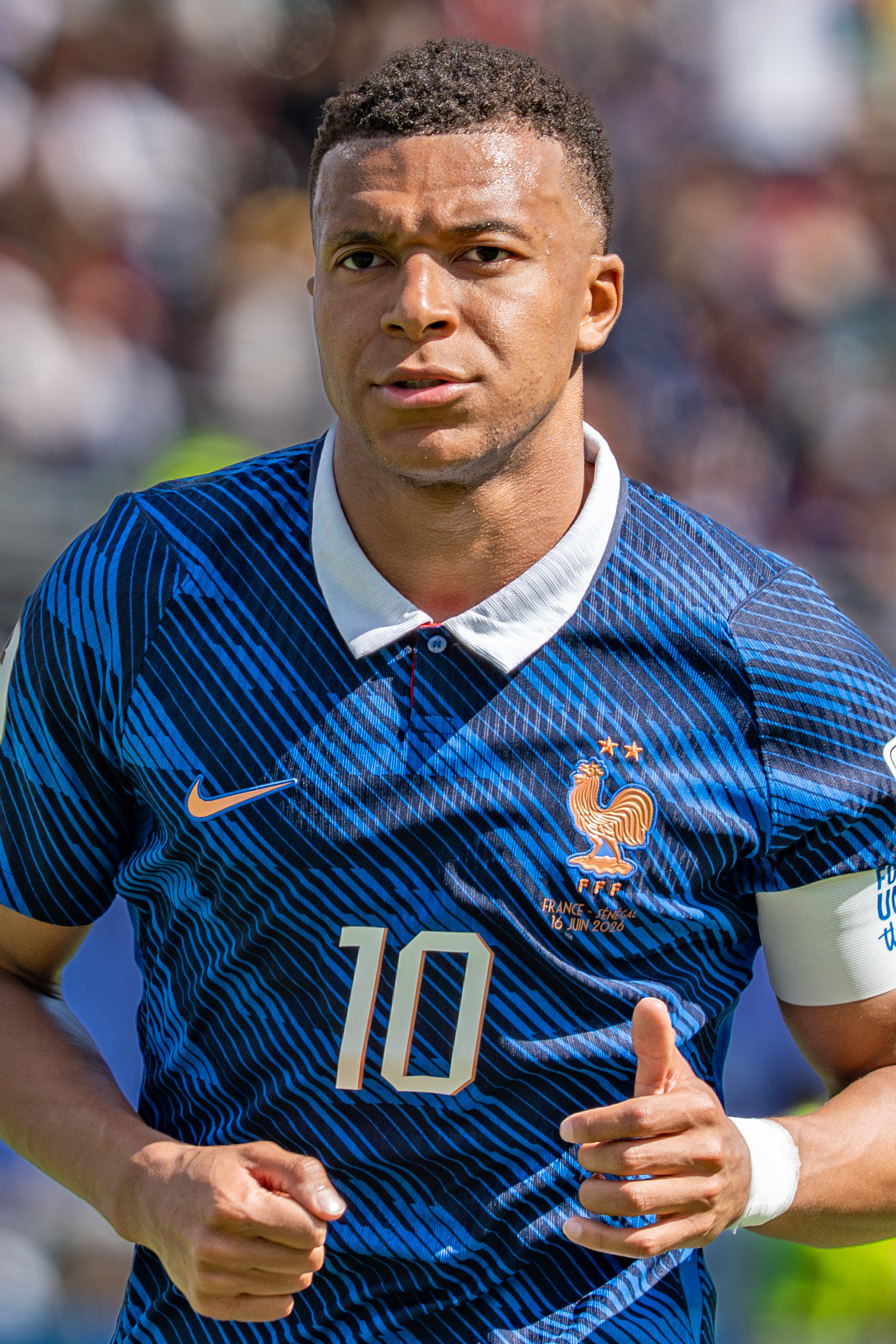
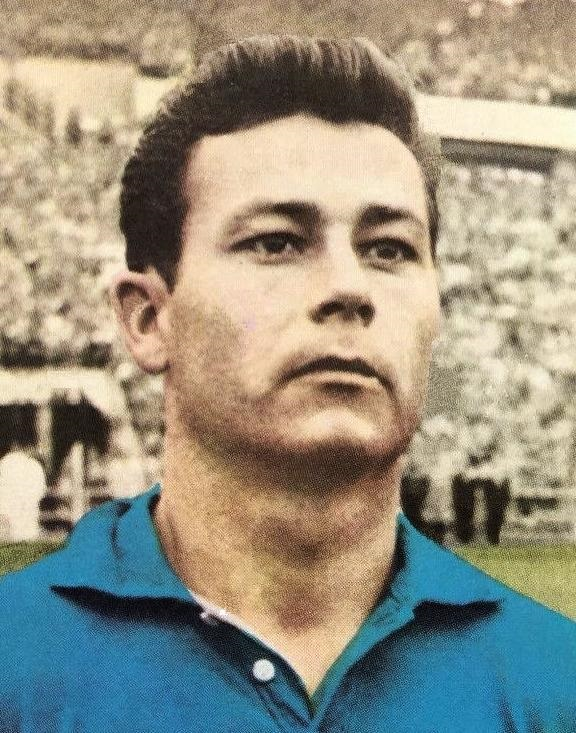
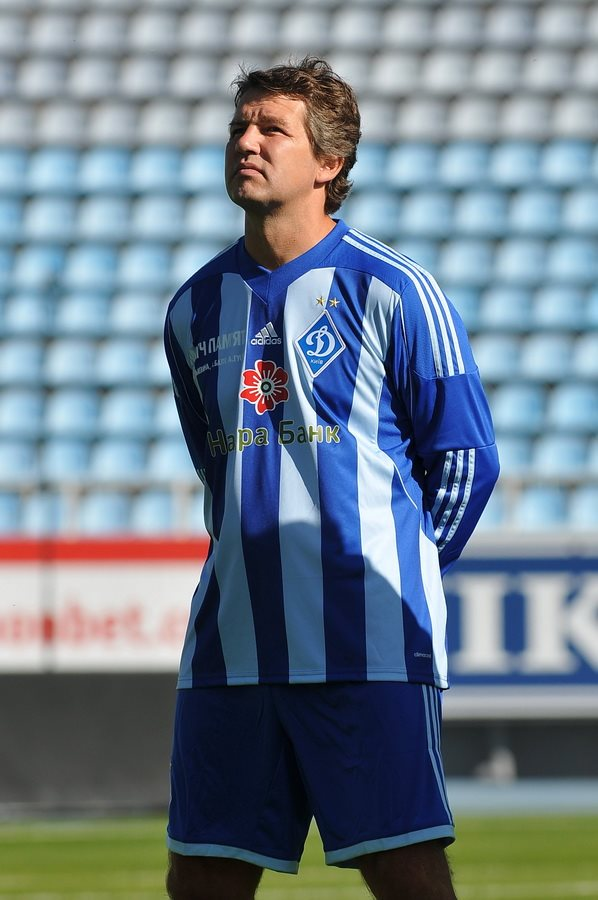
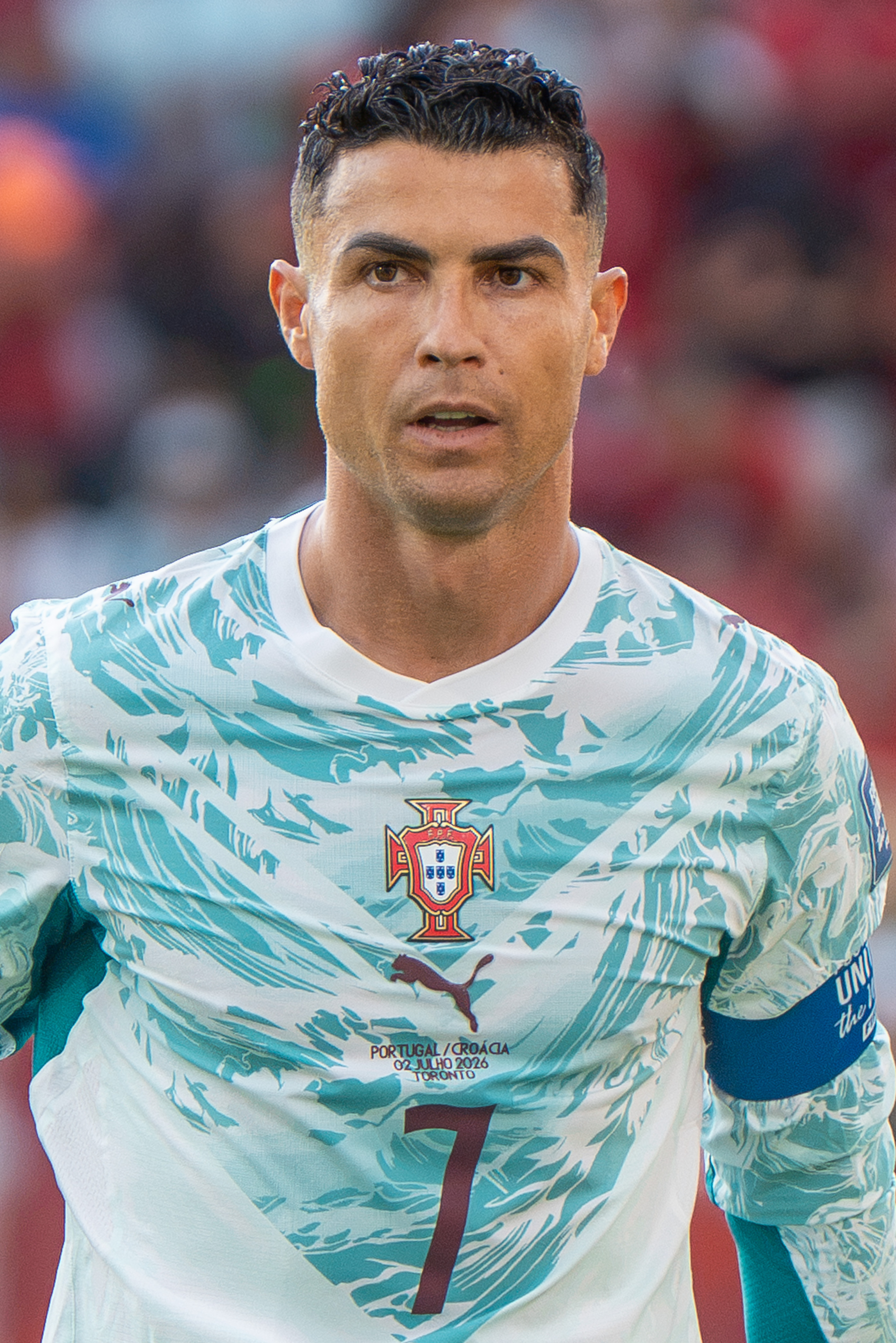
Top: Kylian Mbappé (upper left) the all-time top scorer of the FIFA World Cup with 22 goals.
Just Fontaine (upper right) the player with the most goals scored in a single edition, with 13 goals at the 1958 FIFA World Cup.
Bottom: Oleg Salenko (lower left) the only player to score five goals in a single FIFA World Cup match.
Cristiano Ronaldo (lower right) the only player to score in six different FIFA World Cup editions.

==== Most goals ====
- Most goals: 22 – Kylian Mbappé, for France, 2018–2026
- Most goals in a single tournament: 13 – Just Fontaine, for France, 1958
- Most group stage goals in a tournament: 7
  - Sándor Kocsis, for Hungary, 1954
  - Gerd Müller, for Germany, 1970
- Most goals scored in the group stage: 14 – Lionel Messi, for Argentina, 2006–2026
- Most goals scored in the knockout stage: 14 – Kylian Mbappé, for France, 2018–2026
- Most goals scored in a match: 5 – Oleg Salenko, for Russia v Cameroon, 28 June 1994
- Most goals scored in a final match: 3
  - Geoff Hurst, for England v West Germany, 1966
  - Kylian Mbappé, for France v Argentina, 2022
- Most goals scored in final matches: 4 – Kylian Mbappé, for France, 2018–2022
- Most final matches scored in: 2
  - Vavá, for Brazil, 1958 and 1962
  - Pelé, for Brazil, 1958 and 1970
  - Paul Breitner, for West Germany, 1974 and 1982
  - Zinedine Zidane, for France, 1998 and 2006
  - Kylian Mbappé, for France, 2018 and 2022
- Most goals scored in qualifiers: 41 – Cristiano Ronaldo, for Portugal, 2006–2026

==== Oldest and youngest ====
- Youngest goalscorer: 17 years, 239 days – Pelé for Brazil v Wales, 19 June 1958
- Youngest goalscorer in a final: 17 years, 249 days – Pelé for Brazil v Sweden, 29 June 1958
- Oldest goalscorer: 42 years, 39 days – Roger Milla for Cameroon v Russia, 28 June 1994
- Oldest goalscorer in a knockout stage match: 41 years, 147 days – Cristiano Ronaldo for Portugal v Croatia, 2 July 2026
- Oldest goalscorer in a final: 35 years, 264 days – Nils Liedholm for Sweden v Brazil, 29 June 1958

==== Milestone goals ====
- Scorer of 1st goal – Lucien Laurent, for France v Mexico, 13 July 1930
- Scorer of 100th goal – Angelo Schiavio, for Italy v United States, 27 May 1934
- Scorer of 500th goal – Bobby Collins, for Scotland v Paraguay, 11 June 1958
- Scorer of 1,000th goal – Rob Rensenbrink, for Netherlands v Scotland, 11 June 1978
- Scorer of 1,500th goal - Claudio Caniggia for Argentina v Nigeria, 25 June 1994
- Scorer of 2,000th goal – Marcus Allbäck, for Sweden v England, 20 June 2006
- Scorer of 2,500th goal – Fakhreddine Ben Youssef, for Tunisia v Panama, 28 June 2018
- Scorer of 3,000th goal – Enzo Fernández, for Argentina v Egypt, 7 July 2026

==== Hat-tricks ====
For a detailed list of hat-tricks records and statistics, see the main article.

- Most hat-tricks: 2
  - Sándor Kocsis, for Hungary, 1954 in two separate matches
  - Just Fontaine, for France, 1958 in two separate matches
  - Gerd Müller, for West Germany, 1970 in two separate matches
  - Gabriel Batistuta, for Argentina, 1994 and 1998
- Hat-tricks in a final match:
  - Geoff Hurst, for England v West Germany, 1966
  - Kylian Mbappé, for France v Argentina, 2022
- Youngest player to score a hat-trick: 17 years, 244 days – Pelé, for Brazil v France, 24 June 1958
- Oldest player to score a hat-trick: 38 years, 357 days – Lionel Messi, for Argentina v Algeria, 16 June 2026

==== By method ====
- Most penalty kick goals (excluding penalty shoot-outs): 6 – Harry Kane, for England, 2018–2026
- Most penalty kick goals scored in a tournament: 4
  - Eusébio, for Portugal, 1966
  - Rob Rensenbrink, for Netherlands, 1978
  - Lionel Messi, for Argentina, 2022
- Most penalty kicks missed (excluding penalty shoot-outs): 4 – Lionel Messi, for Argentina, 2018–2026
- Most penalty kicks missed (excluding penalty shoot-outs) in a tournament: 2 – Lionel Messi, for Argentina, 2026
- Most free kick goals: 2 (Note: Includes direct and indirect)
  - Pelé, for Brazil, 1966 and 1970
  - Rivellino, for Brazil, 1970 and 1974
  - Teófilo Cubillas, for Peru, 1970 and 1978
  - Bernard Genghini, for France, 1982
  - David Beckham, for England, 1998 and 2006
  - Lionel Messi, for Argentina, 2014 and 2026
  - Malik Tillman, for United States, 2026
- Most direct corner-kick goals: 1 – Marcos Coll, for Colombia v Soviet Union, 3 June 1962
- Most headed goals: 7 – Miroslav Klose, for Germany, 2002–2010
- Most headed goals in a match: 3
  - Tomáš Skuhravý, for Czechoslovakia v Costa Rica, 23 June 1990
  - Miroslav Klose, for Germany v Saudi Arabia, 1 June 2002

==== Other goals records ====
- Fastest goal: 11 seconds – Hakan Şükür, for Turkey v South Korea, 2002
- Fastest goal in a final: 1:28 minute – Johan Neeskens, for Netherlands v West Germany, 1974
- Latest goal in regular time: 90+13th minute – Mehdi Taremi, for Iran v England, 2022
- Latest goal in extra time: 120+5th minute – Youri Tielemans, for Belgium v Senegal, 2026
- Goals scored in every match en route to the final/match for third place (single tournament):
  - Jairzinho, for Brazil, 1970 (in 6 matches)
  - Just Fontaine, for France, 1958 (in 6 matches)
  - Alcides Ghiggia, for Uruguay, 1950 (in 4 matches)
  - György Sárosi, for Hungary, 1938 (in 4 matches)
- Most consecutive matches scored in: 9 – Lionel Messi, for Argentina, 2022–2026
- Most matches scored in: 16 – Lionel Messi, for Argentina, 2006–2026
- Most tournaments scored in: 6 – Cristiano Ronaldo, for Portugal, 2006–2026

=== Assists ===
Notes: (Note: The following statistics apply Opta's assist criteria to every FIFA World Cup match from 1930 onward. Under Opta's criteria: Assists are not awarded when the ball is significantly deflected or rebounded by an opposing player, altering its trajectory before reaching the goalscorer.; Assists are not awarded for penalties, direct goals from corners or free kicks, or own goals.; While Opta Analyst's published World Cup assist records cover all tournaments from 1966 onward, these shown statistics retrospectively apply the same criteria to earlier editions, from 1930–1962, using available match footage. Where video evidence is unavailable, assists are assessed and verified from contemporary newspaper reports and detailed descriptions of the goals. Consequently, these figures may differ from those published by other sources that do not retrospectively apply Opta's criteria to pre-1966 tournaments and from Opta itself, as they treat all pre-1966 assists as non-existent in their records and statistics.)

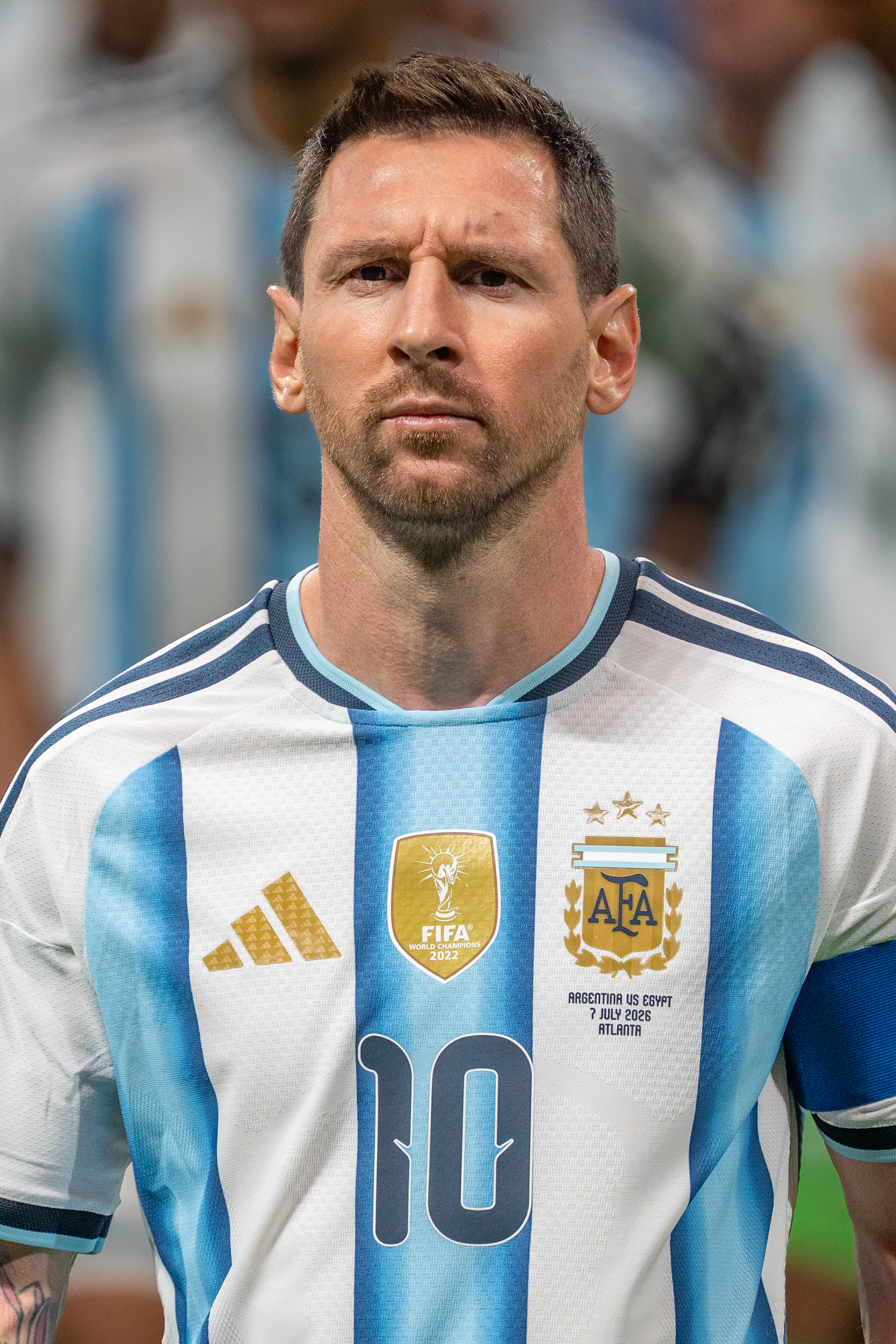
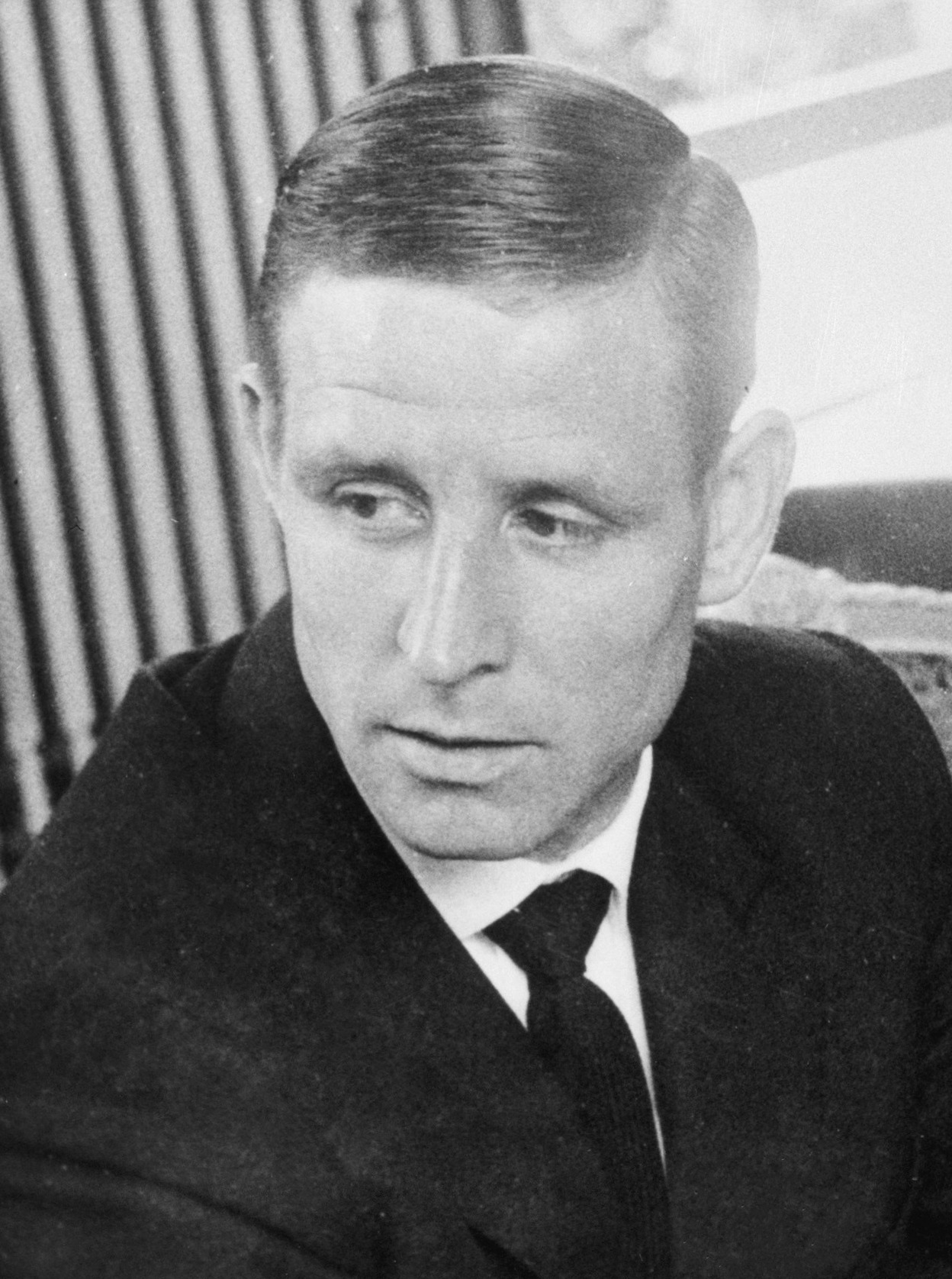
Left: Lionel Messi holds the all-time record for the most assists in FIFA World Cup history, with 12 assists.
Right: Raymond Kopa holds the record for most assists in a single edition, with 8 assists.
- Most assists: 12 – Lionel Messi, for Argentina, 2006–2026
- Most assists in a tournament: 8 – Raymond Kopa, for France, 1958
- Most assists in a match: 4
  - Giovanni Ferrari, for Italy v United States, 27 May 1934
  - Robert Gadocha, for Poland v Haiti, 19 June 1974
- Most assists in final matches: 2
  - Héctor Scarone, for Uruguay, 1930
  - Giuseppe Meazza, for Italy, 1938
  - Mário Zagallo, for Brazil, 1958 and 1962
  - Bobby Moore, for England, 1966
  - Pelé, for Brazil, 1970 (Note: Many sources state that Pelé recorded three assists in FIFA World Cup finals, including Brazil’s second goal against Sweden in the 1958 FIFA World Cup final. However, that assist has not been included in this list because Pelé did not touch the ball, as it was instead deflected by a Swedish defender.)
- Most assists in the group stage: 7 – Grzegorz Lato, for Poland, 1974–1982
- Most assists in the knockout stage: 10 – Lionel Messi, for Argentina, 2010–2026
- Most tournaments assisted in: 6 – Lionel Messi, for Argentina, 2006–2026

=== Goalkeeping ===
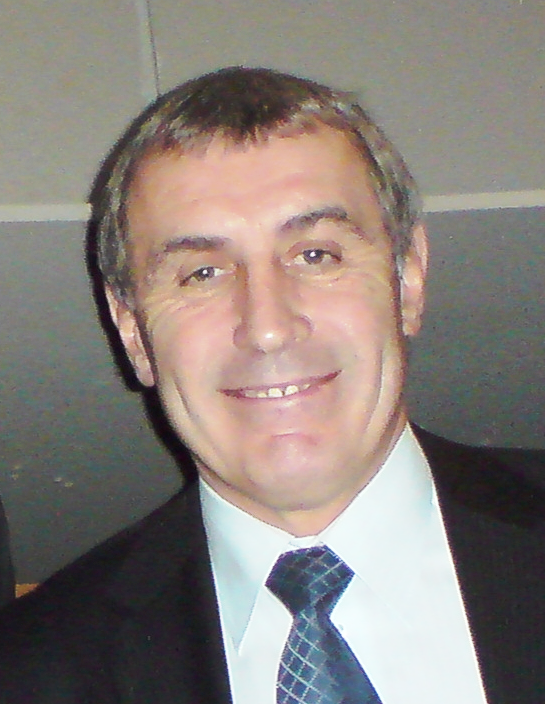
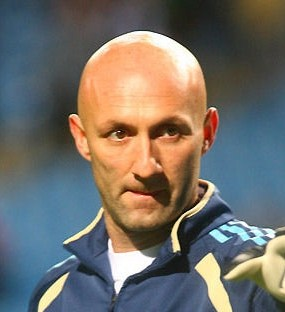
Peter Shilton (left) and Fabien Barthez (right), the joint record holders for the most clean sheets in FIFA World Cup history, with 10 each.
- Most clean sheets: 10
  - Peter Shilton, for England, 1982–1990
  - Fabien Barthez, for France, 1998–2006
- Most clean sheets in a single tournament: 7 – Unai Simón, for Spain, 2026
- Most consecutive clean sheets: 6 – Unai Simón, for Spain, 2022–2026
- Most consecutive minutes without conceding a goal: 650 minutes – Unai Simón, for Spain, 2022–2026
- Most consecutive minutes without conceding a goal in a single tournament: 517 minutes – Walter Zenga, for Italy, 1990
- Most goals conceded: 25
  - Antonio Carbajal, for Mexico, 1950–1966
  - Mohamed Al-Deayea, for Saudi Arabia, 1994–2006
- Most goals conceded in a tournament: 16 – Hong Deok-young, for South Korea, 1954
- Most consecutive matches without clean sheets: 10
  - Antonio Carbajal, for Mexico, 1950–1962
  - Manuel Neuer, for Germany, 2018–2026
- Fewest goals conceded in a tournament: 0 – Pascal Zuberbühler, for Switzerland, 2006 (Note: Zuberbühler kept goal throughout every minute of Switzerland's four matches. Other keepers have kept clean sheets only playing part of their team's matches.)
- Fewest goals conceded in a tournament for the eventual winners: 1 – Unai Simón, for Spain, 2026
- Most penalties saved: 2 (Note: Not including penalty shoot-outs.)
  - Jan Tomaszewski, for Poland, both in 1974
  - Brad Friedel, for United States, both in 2002
  - Iker Casillas, for Spain, 2002 and 2010
  - Wojciech Szczęsny, for Poland, both in 2022
  - Mostafa Shobeir, for Egypt, both in 2026
- Most penalties saved overall in penalty shoot-outs: 4
  - Harald Schumacher, for West Germany, 1982–1986
  - Sergio Goycochea, for Argentina, 1990
  - Danijel Subašić, for Croatia, 2018
  - Dominik Livaković, for Croatia, 2022
- Most penalties saved in one penalty shoot-out: 3
  - Ricardo, for Portugal v England, 2006
  - Danijel Subašić, for Croatia v Denmark, 2018
  - Dominik Livaković, for Croatia v Japan, 2022
- Most penalties saved overall (including shoot-outs): 4
  - Harald Schumacher, for West Germany (1982–1986)
  - Sergio Goycochea, for Argentina (1990)
  - Iker Casillas, for Spain Spain (2002–2010)
  - Danijel Subašić, for Croatia (2018)
  - Dominik Livaković, for Croatia (2022)
  - Yassine Bounou, for Morocco (2022–2026)
- Most saves in a match: 16 – Tim Howard, for United States v Belgium, 2014
- Most saves in a match, no extra time: 15 – Eloy Room, for Curaçao v Ecuador, 2026
- Most saves in a final match: 11 – Emiliano Martínez, for Argentina v Spain, 2026

==== Oldest and youngest ====
- Youngest goalkeeper: 19 years, 191 days – Li Chan-myung for North Korea v Soviet Union, 12 July 1966
- Youngest goalkeeper to keep a clean sheet: 19 years, 198 days – Li Chan-myung for North Korea v Italy, 19 July 1966
- Oldest goalkeeper: 45 years, 161 days – Essam El-Hadary for Egypt v Saudi Arabia, 25 June 2018
- Oldest goalkeeper to keep a clean sheet: 40 years, 281 days – Peter Shilton for England v Belgium, 26 June 1990

=== Discipline ===
- Fastest yellow card: 13 seconds – Jesús Gallardo, for Mexico v Sweden, 2018
- Fastest red card: 56 seconds – José Batista, for Uruguay v Scotland, 1986
- Fastest red card, qualification: 37 seconds – Rashed Al-Hooti, for Bahrain v Iran, 11 October 2011, 2014 FIFA World Cup qualification
- Latest yellow card: During penalty shoot-out – Emiliano Martínez, for Argentina v France, 2022 (Note: Putting French players off.)
- Latest red card: After penalty shoot-out
  - Leandro Cufré, for Argentina v Germany, 2006 (Note: Cufré was red carded for kicking Per Mertesacker in an altercation following the match.)
  - Denzel Dumfries, for Netherlands v Argentina, 2022
- Sent off from the bench – Claudio Caniggia, for Argentina v Sweden, 2002
- Most cards: 7 – Javier Mascherano, Argentina, 2006–2018
- Most yellow cards: 7 – Javier Mascherano, Argentina, 2006–2018
- Most yellow cards in a match: 3 – Josip Šimunić, 61', 90', 93', for Croatia v Australia, 2006, by referee Graham Poll (Note: Šimunić was given three yellow cards in the match as the referee failed to send him off the pitch after the second yellow, and was only red carded after the third yellow.)
- Most red cards: 2
  - Rigobert Song, for Cameroon, 1994 and 1998
  - Zinedine Zidane, for France, 1998 and 2006
- Most suspensions in a tournament: 2 – André Kana-Biyik, for Cameroon, 1990 (Note: Biyik missed the team's second game after receiving a red card in the first, and then missed Cameroon's fifth game after yellow cards in the third and fourth. Others, including Zinedine Zidane in 2006, have earned a second suspension in their team's final match of the tournament, not servable during the tournament.)

== Managers ==
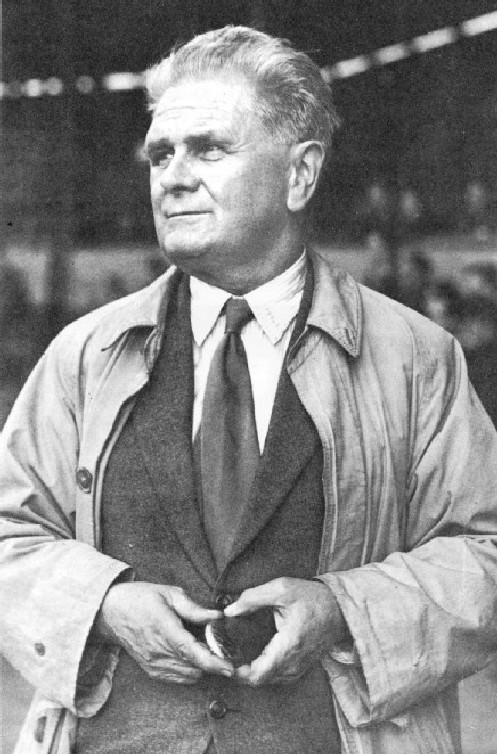
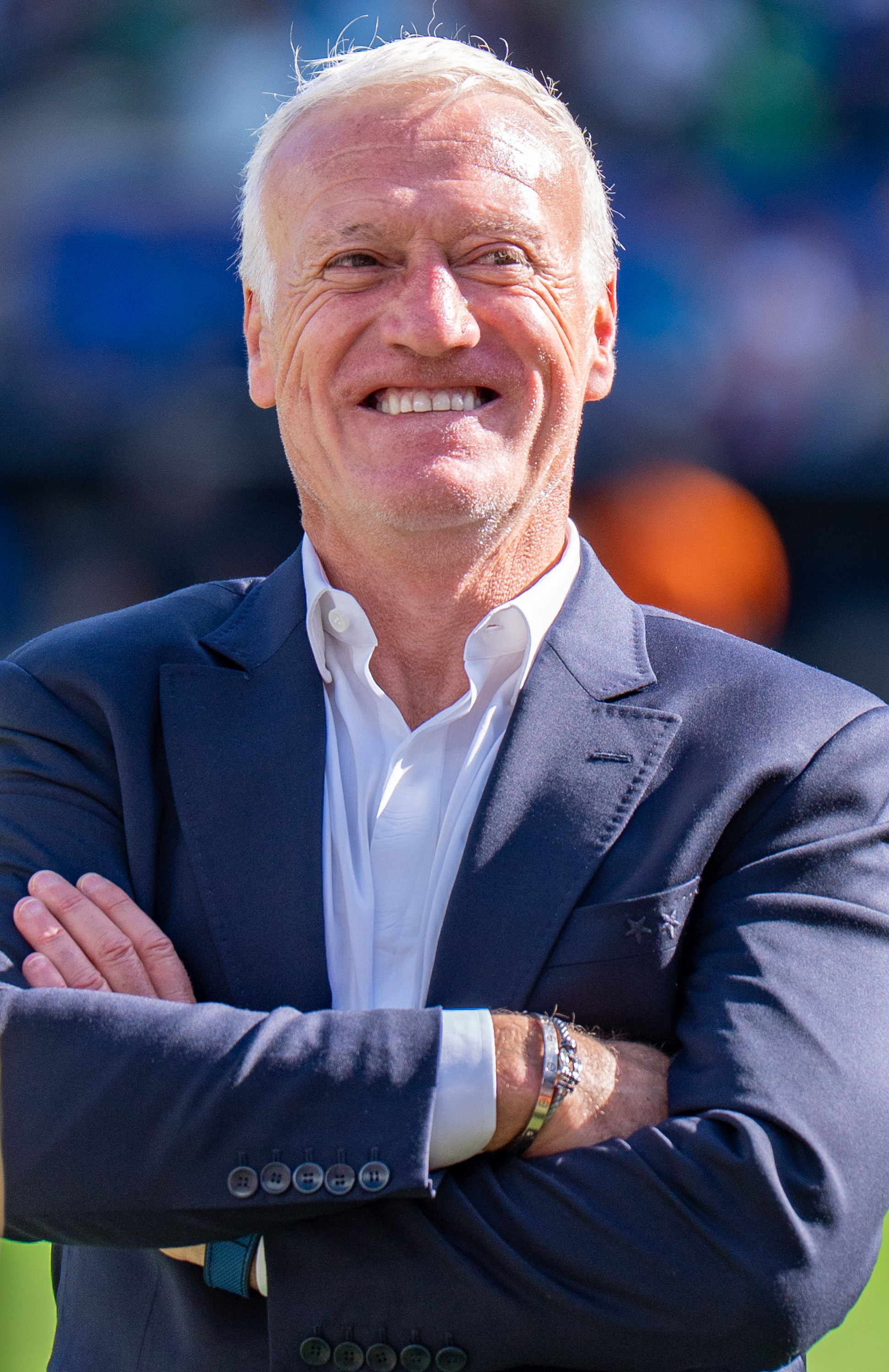
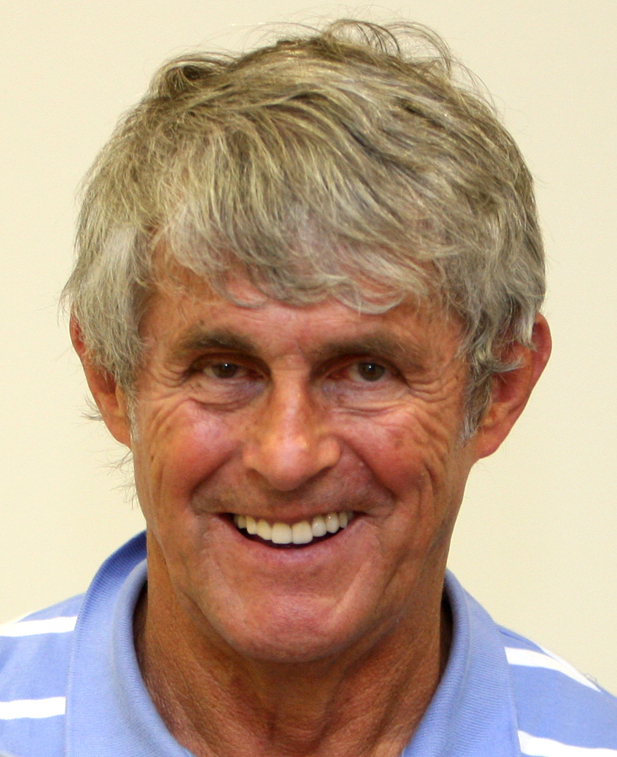
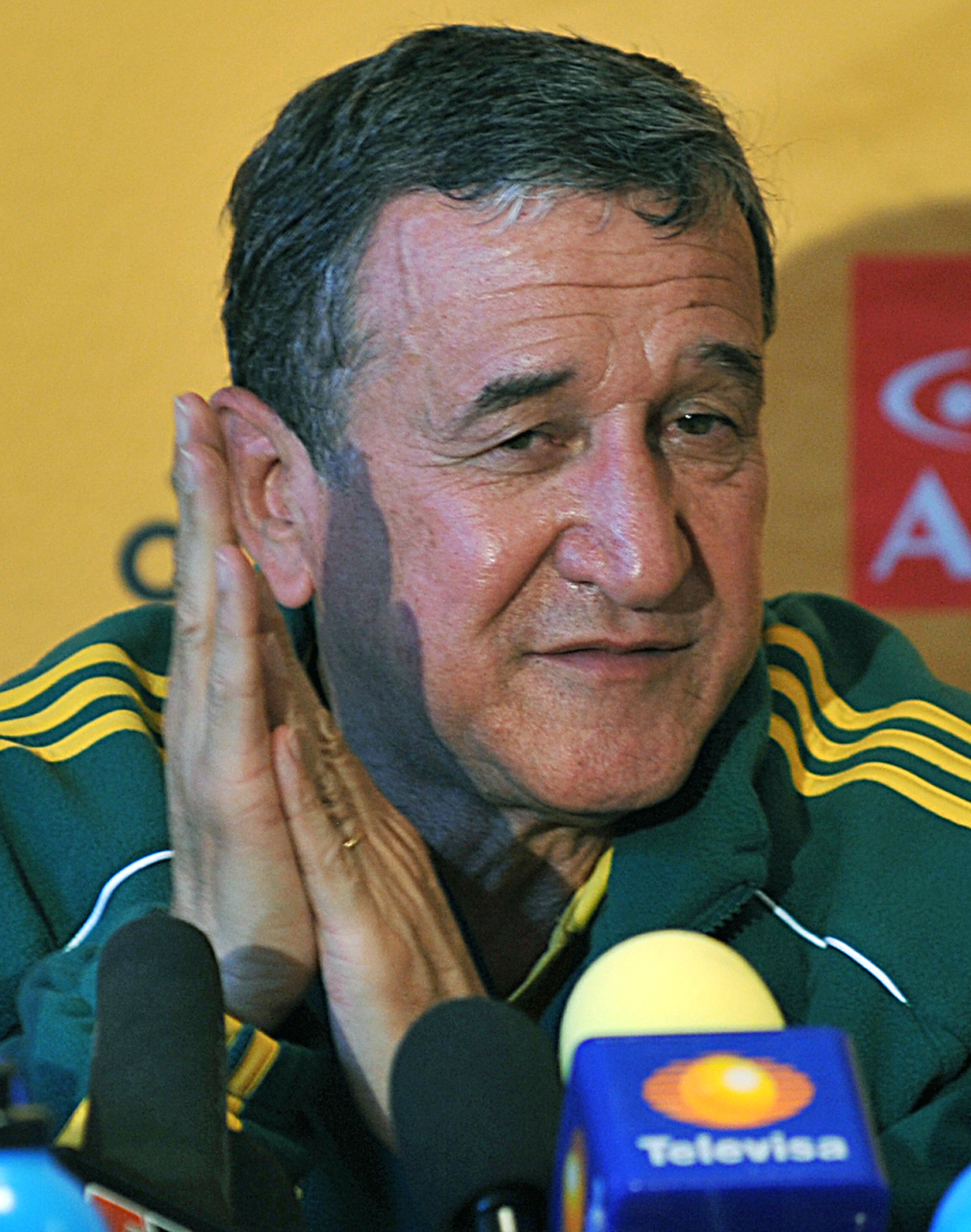
Top: Vittorio Pozzo (upper left) the only coach to have won the FIFA World Cup twice.
Didier Deschamps (upper right) the coach with the most matches managed (27) and most wins (20) in the history of the tournament.
Bottom: Bora Milutinović (lower left) one of only two coaches to have managed in five consecutive editions.
Carlos Alberto Parreira (lower right) the only coach to have managed in six different editions of the FIFA World Cup.
- Most matches coached: 27 – Didier Deschamps, for France, 2014–2026 (Note: Including one group stage match at the 2026 FIFA World Cup, a 4–1 win over Norway, when Deschamps was temporarily represented by his assistant coach.)
- Most matches won: 20 – Didier Deschamps, for France, 2014–2026
- Most tournaments won: 2 – Vittorio Pozzo, for Italy, 1934–1938
- Most tournaments as a coach: 6 – Carlos Alberto Parreira, for Kuwait in 1982, for United Arab Emirates in 1990, for Brazil in 1994 and 2006, for Saudi Arabia in 1998 and for South Africa in 2010
- Most different nations coached: 5
  - (Serbia) Bora Milutinović, for Mexico in 1986, for Costa Rica in 1990, for United States in 1994, for Nigeria in 1998 and for China in 2002
  - Carlos Alberto Parreira, for Kuwait in 1982, for United Arab Emirates in 1990, for Brazil in 1994 and 2006, for Saudi Arabia in 1998 and for South Africa in 2010
- Most consecutive tournaments as a coach: 5
  - (Serbia) Bora Milutinović, 1986–2002
  - (Portugal) Carlos Queiroz, 2010–2026
- Most consecutive tournaments as a coach with the same team: 4
  - Walter Winterbottom, for England, 1950–1962
  - Helmut Schön, for West Germany, 1966–1978
  - Didier Deschamps, for France, 2014–2026
- Youngest coach: 27 years, 267 days – Juan José Tramutola for Argentina v France, 15 July 1930
- Youngest coach of a World Cup winning team: 31 years, 252 days – Alberto Suppici for Uruguay, 1930
- Oldest coach: 78 years, 271 days – (Netherlands) Dick Advocaat for Curaçao v Ivory Coast, 25 June 2026
- Oldest coach of a World Cup winning team: 65 years, 28 days – Luis de la Fuente, for Spain, 2026
- Oldest-living coach: 93 years, 149 days – (Brazil) Evaristo for (Iraq) , 1986
- Longest-lived coach: 103 years, 237 days – (Mexico) Ignacio Trelles, 1962 and 1966
- Oldest-living winning coach: 88 years, 247 days – (Argentina) Carlos Bilardo, 1986
- Longest-lived winning coach: 92 years, 149 days – (Brazil) Mário Zagallo, 1970

== Referees ==
- Most tournaments: 4 – (Iran) (Australia) Alireza Faghani (Note: Attended four tournaments but did not act as the main referee in all of them. Instead, he was exclusively used as a fourth official in a minimum of one edition.), 2014–2026
- Most tournaments (assistant referee): 4 – (Argentina) Juan Pablo Belatti, 2014–2026
- Youngest referee: 24 years and 193 days – (Spain) Juan Gardeazábal, 1958
- Oldest referee: 53 years and 236 days – (England) George Reader, 1950

== Attendance ==
=== Overall attendance records ===
Highest attendance
Rank	Date	Venue	Match	Attendance	Source
1	16 July 1950	Maracanã Stadium, Rio de Janeiro	Uruguay v Brazil	173,850	
2	13 July 1950	Maracanã Stadium, Rio de Janeiro	Brazil v Spain	152,772	
3	1 July 1950	Maracanã Stadium, Rio de Janeiro	Brazil v Yugoslavia	142,409	
4	9 July 1950	Maracanã Stadium, Rio de Janeiro	Brazil v Sweden	138,886	
5	7 June 1986	Estadio Azteca, Mexico City	Mexico v Paraguay	114,600	
5	29 June 1986	Estadio Azteca, Mexico City	Argentina v West Germany	114,600	

- Lowest attendance: Romania v Peru – 300 (14 July 1930, Estadio Pocitos, Montevideo)
- Highest average of attendance: 68,991 per match – 1994
- Lowest average of attendance: 21,059 per match – 1934
- Highest aggregated attendance: 6,730,303 – 2026
- Lowest aggregated attendance: 358,000 – 1934

=== Statistics per tournament ===
Key
†	Denotes the highest attendance-related record

Year	Matches	Attendance							
Year	Matches	Total	Average	Lowest			Highest		
1930	18	434,500	24,139	CHI – FRA	Group stage	2,000	URU – YUG	Final	79,867
1934	17	358,000	21,059	GER – SWE	Quarter-final	3,000	ITA – TCH	Final	55,000
1938	18	376,000	20,889	CUB – ROU; SWE – CUB	Group stage Group stage	7,000	FRA – ITA	Quarter-final	58,455
1950	22	1,043,500	47,432	SUI – MEX	Group stage	3,580	BRA – URU	Final stage	173,850†
1954	26	889,500	34,212	TUR – KOR	Group stage	4,000	FRG – HUN	Final	62,500
1958	35	919,580	26,274	WAL – HUN	Group stage	2,823	BRA – URS	Group stage	50,928
1962	32	899,074	28,096	ENG – BUL	Group stage	5,700	BRA – CHI	Semi-final	76,594
1966	32	1,635,000	51,094	CHI – PRK	Group stage	13,792	ENG – FRA	Group stage	98,270
1970	32	1,603,975	50,124	SWE – ISR	Group stage	9,624	MEX – BEL	Group stage	108,192
1974	38	1,768,152	50,124	BUL – URU	Group stage	13,400	FRG – CHI	Group stage	83,168
1978	38	1,546,151	40,688	TUN – MEX	Group stage	17,396	ITA – ARG	Group stage	71,712
1982	52	2,109,723	40,572	PER – CMR	Group stage	11,000	ARG – BEL	Group stage	95,500
1986	52	2,393,331	46,026	HUN – CAN	Group stage	13,800	MEX – PAR; ARG – FRG	Group stage Final	114,600
1990	52	2,516,348	48,391	YUG – UAE	Group stage	27,833	FRG – YUG	Group stage	74,765
1994	52	3,587,538	68,991†	NGA – BUL	Group stage	44,132	BRA – ITA	Final	94,194
1998	64	2,785,100	43,517	PAR – BUL	Group stage	27,650	BRA – SCO; FRA – KSA; ITA – AUT; BRA – FRA	Group stage Group stage Group stage Final	80,000
2002	64	2,705,197	42,269	ESP – PAR	Group stage	24,000	BRA – GER	Final	69,029
2006	64	3,359,439	52,491	IRI – ANG	Group stage	38,000	BRA – CRO; SWE – PAR; ECU – GER; UKR – TUN; GER – ARG	Group stage Group stage Group stage Group stage Quarter-final	72,000
2010	64	3,178,856	49,670	NZL – SVK	Group stage	23,871	RSA – MEX; NED – ESP	Group stage Final	84,490
2014	64	3,429,873	53,592	RUS – KOR	Group stage	37,603	GER – ARG	Final	74,738
2018	64	3,031,768	47,371	EGY – URU	Group stage	27,015	RUS – KSA; GER – MEX; POR – MAR; DEN – FRA; ESP – RUS; CRO – ENG; FRA – CRO	Group stage Group stage Group stage Group stage Round of 16; Semi-final; Final	78,011
2022	64	3,404,252	53,191	SUI – CMR	Group stage	39,089	ARG – MEX; ARG – CRO; ARG – FRA	Group stage Semi-final; Final	88,966
2026	104	6,810,966†	65,490	GHA – PAN	Group stage	42,942	MEX – RSA; UZB – COL; CZE – MEX; MEX – ECU; MEX – ENG	Group stage Group stage Group stage Round of 32; Round of 16	80,824
2030	104	TBA							
2034	TBA								

Source: FIFA

== See also ==
- Women's Olympic football tournament records and statistics
- Men's Olympic football tournament records and statistics
- UEFA European Championship records and statistics
- FIFA Beach Soccer World Cup records and statistics
- FIFA Women's World Cup records and statistics
- FIFA Confederations Cup records and statistics
- OFC Men's Nations Cup records and statistics
- CONCACAF Gold Cup records and statistics
- FIFA U-20 World Cup records and statistics
- FIFA U-17 World Cup records and statistics
- Africa Cup of Nations records and statistics
- AFC Asian Cup records and statistics
- FIFA Arab Cup records and statistics
- Copa América records and statistics
- FIFA Futsal World Cup
