= Women's Olympic football tournament records and statistics =

This is a list of records and statistics of the football tournament in the Olympic games ever since the inaugural edition in 1996.

== Medal table ==
Rank	Nation	Gold	Silver	Bronze	Total
1	United States	5	1	1	7
2	Germany	1	0	4	5
3	Canada	1	0	2	3
4	Norway	1	0	1	2
5	Brazil	0	3	0	3
6	Sweden	0	2	0	2
7	China	0	1	0	1
7	Japan	0	1	0	1
Totals (8 entries)		8	8	8	24

== Top scorers ==
=== All-time top scorers ===
Rank	Name	Team	Goals
1	(Brazil) Cristiane	Brazil	14
2	(Brazil) Marta	Brazil	13
3	(Canada) Christine Sinclair	Canada	12
4	(Germany) Birgit Prinz	Germany	10
4	(United States) Carli Lloyd	United States	10
4	(Netherlands) Vivianne Miedema	Netherlands	10
4	(Zambia) Barbra Banda	Zambia	10
8	(United States) Abby Wambach	United States	9
9	(Brazil) Pretinha	Brazil	8
10	(Australia) Sam Kerr	Australia	7
10	(Canada) Melissa Tancredi	Canada	7
10	(Sweden) Stina Blackstenius	Sweden	7
13	(United Kingdom) Ellen White	Great Britain	6
13	(Sweden) Lotta Schelin	Sweden	6
13	(United States) Alex Morgan	United States	6
16	(United States) Mia Hamm	United States	5
16	(China) Sun Wen	China	5
16	(United States) Tiffeny Milbrett	United States	5
16	(United States) Megan Rapinoe	United States	5
16	(Germany) Melanie Behringer	Germany	5
16	(France) Marie-Antoinette Katoto	France	5

=== Top scorers by tournament ===
Year	Player	Goals
1996	(Norway) Ann Kristin Aarønes (Norway) Linda Medalen (Brazil) Pretinha	4
2000	(China) Sun Wen	4
2004	(Brazil) Cristiane (Germany) Birgit Prinz	5
2008	(Brazil) Cristiane	5
2012	(Canada) Christine Sinclair	6
2016	(Germany) Melanie Behringer	5
2020	(Netherlands) Vivianne Miedema	10
2024	(France) Marie-Antoinette Katoto	5

== Winning coaches ==
Year	Team	Coaches
1996	United States	(United States) Tony DiCicco
2000	Norway	(Norway) Per-Mathias Høgmo
2004	United States	(United States) April Heinrichs
2008	United States	(Sweden) Pia Sundhage
2012	United States	(Sweden) Pia Sundhage
2016	Germany	(Germany) Silvia Neid
2020	Canada	(United Kingdom) Bev Priestman
2024	United States	(United Kingdom) Emma Hayes

== Fair play award ==
Year	Team
1996	United States
2000	Germany
2004	Japan; Sweden
2008	China
2012	United States
2016	Sweden
2020	Not awarded
2024	Not awarded

== Teams: tournament position ==
Teams having equal quantities in the tables below are ordered by the tournament the quantity was attained in (the teams that attained the quantity first are listed first). If the quantity was attained by more than one team in the same tournament, these teams are ordered alphabetically.

Most titles won
5, United States (1996, 2004, 2008, 2012, 2024).
Most finishes in the top two
6, United States (1996–2012, 2024).
Most finishes in the top three
7, United States (1996–2012, 2020–2024).
Most finishes in the top four
7, United States (1996–2012, 2020–2024).
Most appearances
8, Brazil, United States (all tournaments).

=== Consecutive ===
Most consecutive championships
3, United States (2004–2012).
Most consecutive finishes in the top two
5, United States (1996–2012).
Most consecutive finishes in the top three
5, United States (1996–2012).

=== Gaps ===
Longest gap between successive titles
12 years, United States (2012–2024).

=== Host team ===
Best finish by host team
Champion: United States (1996).
Worst finish by host team
10th position: Greece (2004).

=== Other ===
Most finishes in the top two without ever being champion
3, Brazil (2004, 2008, 2024)
Most finishes in the top three without ever being champion
3, Brazil (2004, 2008, 2024)
Most finishes in the top four without ever being champion
6, Brazil (1996, 2000, 2004, 2008, 2016, 2024).
Most finishes in the top four without ever finishing in the top two
1, France (2012), Australia (2020), Spain (2024).

== Coaches: tournament position ==
Most championships
2, Pia Sundhage (United States, 2008, 2012).
Most finishes in the top two
3, Pia Sundhage (United States, 2008, 2012; Sweden, 2016).
Most finishes in the top three
3, Pia Sundhage (United States, 2008, 2012; Sweden, 2016).
Most finishes in the top four
3, Pia Sundhage (United States, 2008, 2012; Sweden, 2016).

== Teams: matches played and goals scored ==
=== All time ===
Most matches played
44, United States.
Most wins
33, United States.
Most losses
14, Brazil.
Most draws
8, Brazil.
Most goals scored
88, United States.
Most hat-tricks scored
3, Zambia.
Most goals conceded
43, China.
Fewest goals scored
0, Greece.
Fewest goals conceded
5, Argentina and Chile.
Highest goal difference
+50, United States.
Lowest goal difference
-23, New Zealand.
Highest average of goals scored per match
5.75, Netherlands.
Highest average of goals conceded per match
5.00, Zimbabwe.

== Individual ==
Most tournaments played
7, Formiga (Brazil, 1996–2020).
Most medals
4, Christie Rampone (United States, 2000–2012).
Most matches played, finals
33, Formiga (Brazil, 1996–2020).
Most matches won
19, Christie Rampone (United States, 2000–2012).
Youngest player
16 years, 119 days, Ellie Carpenter (Australia), vs Zimbabwe, 9 August 2016.
Oldest player
43 years, 149 days, Formiga (Brazil), vs Canada, 30 July 2021.

== Goalscoring ==
=== Individual ===
Most goals scored, overall finals
14, Cristiane (Brazil), 2004–2016.
Most goals scored in a tournament
10, Vivianne Miedema (Netherlands), 2020.
Most goals scored in a match
4, Birgit Prinz (Germany), vs China, 2004; Vivianne Miedema (Netherlands) vs Zambia, 2020; Wang Shuang (China), vs Zambia, 2020.
Most goals scored in a lost match
3, Christine Sinclair, (Canada), vs United States, 2012; Barbra Banda, (Zambia), vs Netherlands, 2020 & vs Australia, 2024.
Most goals scored in a final match
2, Tiffeny Milbrett (United States), vs Norway, 2000; Carli Lloyd (United States), vs Japan, 2012.
Most goals scored in all final matches
3, Tiffeny Milbrett (United States), 1 vs China in 1996 & 2 vs Norway in 2000; Carli Lloyd (United States), 1 vs Brazil in 2008 & 2 vs Japan in 2012.
Fastest hat-trick
14 minutes, Cristiane (Brazil), scored at 34', 35' and 45+3', vs Nigeria, 2008.
Most hat-tricks
3, Barbra Banda (Zambia), 2020-2024.
Youngest hat-trick scorer
19 years, 94 days, Cristiane (Brazil), vs Greece, 17 August 2004.
Youngest goalscorer, final
20 years, 196 days, Stina Blackstenius (Sweden), vs Germany, 19 August 2016.
Oldest hat-trick scorer
29 years, 55 days, Christine Sinclair (Canada), vs United States, 6 August 2012.
Oldest goalscorer, final
30 years, 24 days, Carli Lloyd (United States), vs Japan, 9 August 2012.
Most penalties scored (excluding during shootouts)
2, Perpetua Nkwocha (Nigeria), 1 each in 2000 & 2008.

=== Team ===
Biggest margin of victory
8, Germany (8) vs China (0), 2004.
Most goals scored in a match, one team
10, Netherlands vs Zambia, 2020.
Most goals scored in a match, both teams
13, Netherlands (10) vs Zambia (3), 2020.

=== Tournament ===
Most goals scored in a tournament
101 goals, 2020.
Fewest goals scored in a tournament
42 goals, 2000.
Most goals per match in a tournament
3.88 goals per match, 2020.
Fewest goals per match in a tournament
2.54 goals per match, 2008, 2016.

== Coaching ==
Most final appearances as head coach
3, Pia Sundhage, (United States 2008 & 2012, Sweden 2016), John Herdman (New Zealand 2008, Canada 2012 & 2016).

Most final appearances as player and head coach
4, Pia Sundhage, (Sweden 1996 as player and 2016 as coach; United States 2008 & 2012 as coach).

== Discipline ==
Most sendings off (match, both teams)
2, China (1) vs Brazil (1), 1996.
Most cautions (match, both teams)
8, Brazil (4) vs United States (4), 2000.

== Attendance ==
Highest attendance in a match
80,203, United States vs Japan, 9 August 2012, Wembley Stadium, London, 2012.
Highest attendance in a final
80,203, United States vs Japan, 9 August 2012, Wembley Stadium, London, 2012.
Lowest attendance in a match
1,418, United States vs Japan, 20 August 2004, Kaftanzoglio Stadium, Thessaloniki, 2004.
Highest average of attendance per match
43,235, 1996.
Highest attendance in a tournament
740,014, 2008.
Lowest average of attendance per match
10,432, 2004.
Lowest attendance in a tournament
208,637, 2004.

== See also ==
- List of men's Olympic football tournament records
