= Men's Olympic football tournament records and statistics =

This is a list of records and statistics of the football tournament in the Olympic games ever since the inaugural official edition in 1908.

== Medal table ==
- Bronze medals shared in 1972 tournament

Rank	Nation	Gold	Silver	Bronze	Total
1	Hungary	3	1	1	5
2	Great Britain	3	0	0	3
3	Brazil	2	3	2	7
4	Spain	2	3	0	5
5	Argentina	2	2	0	4
6	Soviet Union	2	0	3	5
7	Uruguay	2	0	0	2
8	Yugoslavia	1	3	1	5
9	France	1	2	0	3
9	Poland	1	2	0	3
11	East Germany	1	1	1	3
11	Nigeria	1	1	1	3
13	Czechoslovakia	1	1	0	2
14	Italy	1	0	2	3
14	Sweden	1	0	2	3
16	Belgium	1	0	1	2
16	Mexico	1	0	1	2
18	Cameroon	1	0	0	1
18	Canada	1	0	0	1
20	Denmark	0	3	1	4
21	Bulgaria	0	1	1	2
21	United States	0	1	1	2
23	Austria	0	1	0	1
23	Germany	0	1	0	1
23	Paraguay	0	1	0	1
23	Switzerland	0	1	0	1
27	Netherlands	0	0	3	3
28	Chile	0	0	1	1
28	Ghana	0	0	1	1
28	Japan	0	0	1	1
28	Morocco	0	0	1	1
28	Norway	0	0	1	1
28	South Korea	0	0	1	1
28	United Team of Germany	0	0	1	1
28	West Germany	0	0	1	1
Totals (35 entries)		28	28	29	85

== Top scorers by tournament ==
Year	Player(s)	Goals
1900	(France) Gaston Peltier (United Kingdom) John Nicholas	2
1904	(Canada) Alexander Hall (Canada) Tom Taylor	3
1908	(Denmark) Sophus Nielsen	11
1912	(Germany) Gottfried Fuchs	10
1920	(Sweden) Herbert Karlsson	7
1924	(Uruguay) Pedro Petrone	7
1928	(Argentina) Domingo Tarasconi	11
1936	(Italy) Annibale Frossi	7
1948	(Denmark) John Hansen (Sweden) Gunnar Nordahl	7
1952	(Socialist Federal Republic of Yugoslavia) Rajko Mitić (Socialist Federal Republic of Yugoslavia) Branko Zebec	7
1956	(India) Neville D'Souza (Socialist Federal Republic of Yugoslavia) Todor Veselinović (Bulgaria) Dimitar Milanov	4
1960	(Denmark) Harald Nielsen	8
1964	(Hungary) Ferenc Bene	12
1968	(Japan) Kunishige Kamamoto	7
1972	(Poland) Kazimierz Deyna	9
1976	(Poland) Andrzej Szarmach	6
1980	(Soviet Union) Sergey Andreyev	5
1984	(Socialist Federal Republic of Yugoslavia) Borislav Cvetković (Socialist Federal Republic of Yugoslavia) Stjepan Deverić (France) Daniel Xuereb	5
1988	(Brazil) Romário	7
1992	(Poland) Andrzej Juskowiak	7
1996	(Brazil) Bebeto (Argentina) Hernán Crespo	6
2000	(Chile) Iván Zamorano	6
2004	(Argentina) Carlos Tevez	8
2008	(Italy) Giuseppe Rossi	4
2012	(Brazil) Leandro Damião	6
2016	(Germany) Serge Gnabry (Germany) Nils Petersen	6
2020	(Brazil) Richarlison	5
2024	(Morocco) Soufiane Rahimi	8

== Records ==
Starting with the first official football tournament in London in 1908, Denmark's Sophus Nielsen and Hungary's Antal Dunai share the record for the most total goals scored by a player in tournament history. Both have 13 goals: Nielsen scored 11 goals in 1908 and two in 1912, and Dunai scored six in 1968 and seven in 1972. Ferenc Bene holds the record for the most goals scored by a player in a single Olympics tournament, scoring 12 goals in the 1964 edition. Sophus Nielsen and Gottfried Fuchs share the record for most goals scored in a single Olympic match at 10. Nielson achieved that in the semi-final match against France in 1908, and Fuchs did so in the first-round match against Russia in the 1912 consolation tournament.

Neymar scored the fastest goal in a men's Olympic football match in history, 14 seconds into the semi-final match against Honduras on 17 August 2016.

== All-time top scorers ==
The all-time top goalscorers with at least 7 goals (since 1908)

Rank	Player	Team	Goals
1	(Denmark) Sophus Nielsen	Denmark	13
1	(Hungary) Antal Dunai	Hungary	13
3	(Hungary) Ferenc Bene	Hungary	12
4	(Argentina) Domingo Tarasconi	Argentina	11
4	(Uruguay) Pedro Petrone	Uruguay	11
6	(Germany) Gottfried Fuchs	Germany	10
6	(Poland) Kazimierz Deyna	Poland	10
8	(United Kingdom) Harold Walden	Great Britain	9
8	(Denmark) Vilhelm Wolfhagen	Denmark	9
10	(Netherlands) Jan Vos	Netherlands	8
10	(Italy) Adolfo Baloncieri	Italy	8
10	(Uruguay) Hector Scarone	Uruguay	8
10	(Argentina) Carlos Tevez	Argentina	8
10	(Brazil) Bebeto	Brazil	8
10	(Denmark) Harald Nielsen	Denmark	8
10	(Egypt) Ibrahim Reyadh	Egypt	8
10	(Morocco) Soufiane Rahimi	Morocco	8
18	(Denmark) John Hansen	Denmark	7
18	(Denmark) Anthon Olsen	Denmark	7
18	(Sweden) Gunnar Nordahl	Sweden	7
18	(Italy) Annibale Frossi	Italy	7
18	(Denmark) Vilhelm Wolfhagen	Denmark	7
18	(Sweden) Herbert Carlsson	Sweden	7
18	(Socialist Federal Republic of Yugoslavia) Branko Zebec	Yugoslavia	7
18	(Socialist Federal Republic of Yugoslavia) Milan Galić	Yugoslavia	7
18	(Japan) Kunishige Kamamoto	Japan	7
18	(Poland) Andrzej Juskowiak	Poland	7
18	(Brazil) Romario	Brazil	7
18	(Brazil) Neymar	Brazil	7

== Hat-tricks ==
Since the first official tournament in 1908 in England, 99 hat-tricks have been scored in over 1,000 matches of the 28 editions of the tournament.

== Teams: tournament position ==
Teams having equal quantities in the tables below are ordered by the tournament the quantity was attained in (the teams that attained the quantity first are listed first). If the quantity was attained by more than one team in the same tournament, these teams are ordered alphabetically.

Most titles won
3, Great Britain (1900, 1908, 1912); Hungary (1952, 1964, 1968).
Most finishes in the top two
5, Brazil (1984, 1988, 2012, 2016, 2020), Spain (1920, 1992, 2000, 2020, 2024)
Most finishes in the top three
7, Brazil (1984, 1988, 1996, 2008, 2012, 2016, 2020).
Most finishes in the top four
8, Brazil (1976, 1984, 1988, 1996, 2008, 2012, 2016, 2020).
Most appearances
15, Italy (1912, 1920, 1924, 1928, 1936, 1948, 1952, 1960, 1984, 1988, 1992, 1996, 2000, 2004, 2008).
15, United States (1904, 1924, 1928, 1936, 1948, 1952, 1956, 1972, 1984, 1988, 1992, 1996, 2000, 2008, 2024).

=== Consecutive ===
Most consecutive medals
4, Yugoslavia (1948–52–56–60);Hungary (1960–64–68–72); Brazil (2008–12–16–20).
Most consecutive golds
2, Great Britain (1908–12); (Note: Although Great Britain won the 1900 competition, this is not recognized by FIFA.) Uruguay (1924–28); Hungary (1964–68); Argentina (2004–08); Brazil (2016–20).
Most consecutive silvers
3, Yugoslavia (1948–52–56).
Most consecutive bronzes
3, Netherlands (1908–12–20).
Most consecutive top three finishes
3, Soviet Union (1972–1980). (Note: Although UEFA was founded in 1954, its records include all European teams which become UEFA members.)
Most consecutive championships by a confederation
13, UEFA, (1936–1992).
Most consecutive matches won
12, Argentina (2004–2008), six in each tournament.
Most consecutive appearances
9, South Korea (1988–2020)

=== Gaps ===
Longest gap between titles
32 years, Soviet Union (1956–1988); Spain (1992–2024).
Longest gap between appearances in the top two
72 years, Spain (1920–1992).

=== Host team ===
Best finish by host team
Champion: Great Britain (1908); Belgium (1920); Spain (1992); Brazil (2016).

=== Other ===
Most finishes in the top two without ever being champion
3, Denmark (1908, 1912, 1960).
Most finishes in the top three without ever being champion
4, Denmark (1908, 1912, 1948, 1960).
Most finishes in the top four without ever being champion
4, Netherlands (1908, 1912, 1920, 1924); Denmark (1908, 1912, 1948, 1960).

== Teams: matches played and goals scored ==
=== All time ===
Most matches played
66, Brazil.
Most wins
38, Brazil.
Most losses
23, Italy.
Most draws
13, South Korea.
Most goals scored
134, Brazil.
Most goals conceded
102, Serbia.
Fewest goals conceded
1, Estonia.

== Individual ==
Most matches played, finals
13, Dezső Novák (Hungary, 1960–1968); Antal Dunai (Hungary, 1964–1972); Lajos Szűcs (Hungary, 1968–1972); Miklós Páncsics (Hungary, 1968–1972).

=== Players who won Summer Olympics and FIFA World Cup ===
Player	Team	Gold medal	FIFA World Cup
José Leandro Andrade	Uruguay	1924 1928	1930
Pedro Cea	Uruguay	1924 1928	1930
José Nasazzi	Uruguay	1924 1928	1930
Pedro Petrone	Uruguay	1924 1928	1930
Héctor Scarone	Uruguay	1924 1928	1930
Santos Urdinarán	Uruguay	1924 1928	1930
Peregrino Anselmo	Uruguay	1928	1930
Héctor Castro	Uruguay	1928	1930
Lorenzo Fernández	Uruguay	1928	1930
Álvaro Gestido	Uruguay	1928	1930
Domingo Tejera	Uruguay	1928	1930
Sergio Bertoni	Italy	1936	1938
Alfredo Foni	Italy	1936	1938
Ugo Locatelli	Italy	1936	1938
Pietro Rava	Italy	1936	1938
Ángel Di María (Note: Also won FIFA U-20 World Cup.)	Argentina	2008	2022
Lionel Messi (Note: Also won FIFA U-20 World Cup and FIFA Club World Cup.)	Argentina	2008	2022
Álex Baena	Spain	2024	2026
Pau Cubarsí	Spain	2024	2026
Eric García	Spain	2024	2026
Joan García	Spain	2024	2026
Marc Pubill	Spain	2024	2026

== Goalscoring ==
=== Individual ===
Most goals scored, overall finals
13, Sophus Nielsen (Denmark), 1908–1912; Antal Dunai (Hungary), 1964-1972.
Most goals scored in a tournament
12, Ferenc Bene (Hungary), 1964.
Most goals scored in a match
10, Sophus Nielsen (Denmark), vs France, 1908; Gottfried Fuchs (Germany), vs Russia, 1912.
First goalscorer
Nils Middelboe (Denmark), vs France, 19 October 1908.
Youngest goalscorer
16 years, 332 days, Ángel Uribe (Peru), vs France, 26 August 1960.
Oldest goalscorer
38 years, 243 days, Ryan Giggs (Great Britain), vs United Arab Emirates, 29 July 2012.

=== Team ===
Most goals scored in a match, one team
17, Denmark vs France, 1908.
Most goals scored in a match, both teams
18, Denmark (17) vs France (1), 1908.
Highest scoring draw
5–5, Soviet Union vs Yugoslavia, 1952.
Fewest goals conceded in a tournament
0, Argentina in Athens 2004

=== Tournament ===
Most goals scored in a tournament
135 goals, 1952; 1972.
Fewest goals scored in a tournament
48 goals, 1908.
Most goals per match in a tournament
8.00 goals per match, 1908.
Fewest goals per match in a tournament
2.34 goals per match, 2008.

== Winning managers ==
Games	Gold	Silver	Bronze
1904	(Canada) Louis Blake Duff	(United States) Joe Lydon	None
1908	(England) Alfred Davis	(England) Charlie Williams	(England) Edgar Chadwick
1912	(England) Adrian Birch	(England) Charlie Williams	(England) Edgar Chadwick
1920	(Belgium) Raoul Daufresne de la Chevalerie	(Spain) Francisco Bru	(England) Frederick Warburton
1924	(Uruguay) Ernesto Fígoli	(England) Edward Duckworth	(Hungary) József Nagy
1928	(Uruguay) Primo Gianotti	(Spain) José Lago Millan	(Italy) Augusto Rangone
1936	(Italy) Vittorio Pozzo	(England) Jimmy Hogan	(Norway) Asbjørn Halvorsen
1948	(England) George Raynor	(Socialist Federal Republic of Yugoslavia) Milorad Arsenijević	(England) Reg Mountford
1952	(Hungary) Gusztáv Sebes	(Socialist Federal Republic of Yugoslavia) Milorad Arsenijević	(England) George Raynor
1956	(Soviet Union) Gavriil Kachalin	(Socialist Federal Republic of Yugoslavia) Milovan Ćirić	(Bulgaria) Stoyan Ormandzhiev & (Bulgaria) Krum Milev
1960	(Socialist Federal Republic of Yugoslavia) Aleksandar Tirnanić	(Denmark) Arne Sørensen	(Hungary) Béla Volentik
1964	(Hungary) Károly Lakat	(Czechoslovakia) Rudolf Vytlačil	(Hungary) Károly Sós
1968	(Hungary) Károly Lakat	(Bulgaria) Georgi Berkov	(Japan) Ken Naganuma
1972	(Poland) Kazimierz Górski	(Hungary) Rudolf Illovszky	(East Germany) Georg Buschner
1972	(Poland) Kazimierz Górski	(Hungary) Rudolf Illovszky	(Soviet Union) Aleksandr Ponomarev
1976	(East Germany) Georg Buschner	(Poland) Kazimierz Górski	(Soviet Union) Valeriy Lobanovskyi
1980	(Czechoslovakia) František Havránek	(East Germany) Rudolf Krause	(Soviet Union) Konstantin Beskov
1984	(France) Henri Michel	(Brazil) Jair Picerni	(Socialist Federal Republic of Yugoslavia) Ivan Toplak
1988	(Soviet Union) Anatoliy Byshovets	(Brazil) Carlos Alberto Silva	(Germany) Hannes Löhr
1992	(Spain) Vicente Miera	(Poland) Janusz Wójcik	(Ghana) Sam Arday
1996	(Netherlands) Jo Bonfrère	(Argentina) Daniel Passarella	(Brazil) Mário Zagallo
2000	(Cameroon) Jean-Paul Akono	(Spain) Iñaki Sáez	(Uruguay) Nelson Acosta
2004	(Argentina) Marcelo Bielsa	(Paraguay) Carlos Jara	(Italy) Claudio Gentile
2008	(Argentina) Sergio Batista	(Nigeria) Samson Siasia	(Brazil) Dunga
2012	(Mexico) Luis Fernando Tena	(Brazil) Mano Menezes	(South Korea) Hong Myung-bo
2016	(Brazil) Rogério Micale	(Germany) Horst Hrubesch	(Nigeria) Samson Siasia
2020	(Brazil) André Jardine	(Spain) Luis de la Fuente	(Mexico) Jaime Lozano
2024	(Spain) Santi Denia	(France) Thierry Henry	(Morocco) Tarik Sektioui

=== Managers who won Summer Olympics and FIFA World Cup ===
Manager	Team	Gold medal	FIFA World Cup
Vittorio Pozzo	Italy	1936	1934, 1938

== Discipline ==
Most sendings off (all-time, team)
6, Italy, Morocco, Spain.
Most cautions (all-time, team)
91, Italy.

== Attendance ==
Highest average of attendance per match
47,660, 2012.
Lowest average of attendance per match
3,333, 1908.

== See also ==
- List of men's Olympic football tournament hat-tricks
- Women's Olympic football tournament records and statistics
