= Trond Kindervåg =

Norwegian footballer (born 1976)

Personal information
- Date of birth: 27 November 1976 (age 49)
- Height: 1.86 m (6 ft 1 in)
- Position: Defender

Youth career
- Brodd
- Buøy
- Viking

Senior career*
Years	Team	Apps	(Gls)
1994–1997	Viking	64	(4)
1998–2000	Lyn	41	(3)
2001	Ullern		
2002	Bærum		
2003	Kurer		
2006–2007	Buøy		
2008–2014	Brodd		

International career
1994	Norway U17	3	(0)
1995	Norway U18	4	(0)
1996	Norway U21	3	(0)
- * Club domestic league appearances and goals

Trond Kindervåg (born 27 November 1976) is a retired Norwegian football defender. He played in Eliteserien for Viking FK and the 1. divisjon for SFK Lyn, as well as being capped for Norway up until U21 level.

== Viking FK career ==
Hailing from Stavanger, he played youth football for Brodd and Buøy before joining Viking at the age of 15. He was promoted from Viking's junior team to their senior team in 1994, alongside four other players: Trond Bjørnsen, Bjarte Lunde Aarsheim, Erik Fuglestad and Trond Debes. The quintet had apprentice status. Aarsheim and Fuglestad were older, and made their breakthrough before Kindervåg. In 1995, Kindervåg was still eligible for Viking's U20 team, and helped them win the Norwegian U20 Football Cup. In the same year, he also finished secondary school at St. Svithun, and joined sports studies at Stavanger University College. As an apprentice his wages were too low to make a living. He was also capped for Norway U17, U18 and U21.

Ahead of the 1996 Eliteserien, Kindervåg looked certain to win a berth as a starting player. He was given a more economically viable contract by chairman Svein Kvia. Whereas Kindervåg felt he lacked confidence from the previous manager Bjarne Berntsen, and "would probably have changed teams if nothing had happened", Viking's new manager Poul Erik Andreasen chose to play Kindervåg and praised him after a friendly winter tournament. Andreasen later blamed Kindervåg and Ulf Karlsen after a 0–4 loss to Rosenborg in another friendly two weeks before the league opener. Nonetheless, Viking started the 1996 Eliteserien with Karlsen and Kindervåg in central defense, and as Viking went undefeated in the first matches, Kindervåg received praise for "growing" as a player.

Finishing in bronze position in the 1996 Eliteserien, Viking qualified for the 1997-98 UEFA Cup. Kindervåg played one of the UEFA Cup matches, the home leg against Vojvodina Novi Sad where Viking progressed after a penalty shootout.

== Later career ==
After the 1997 season, Stavanger Aftenblad reported that Kindervåg would leave Viking. He had offers from Bryne FK, Skeid and Lyn. He chose moving to Oslo, where he spent several seasons. He first played on the second tier for Lyn from 1998 to 2000, then Ullern IF, Bærum SK and the Christian team FK Kurer, before moving home to Stavanger. Here he played for Buøy for two seasons, before finishing his career with a long period in Brodd.

In Lyn, he would primarily compete with Thomas Østvold and Kjetil Wæhler for a place in central defense. The goal of the team was promotion from the 1998 1. divisjon.

== Personal life ==
He grew up in the borough Storhaug. His paternal grandfather Bjarne Kindervåg, as well as Bjarne's brother Håkon Kindervåg, won the 1953 Norwegian Football Cup for Viking. Håkon Kindervåg was also capped once for Norway.

Trond Kindervåg was nicknamed "Kinder". A football idol in his younger days was Roger Nilsen. After retiring as a player, he worked in Statoil.

Trond Kindervåg should not be confused with Trond Kenneth Kindervåg, born 1984, also a footballer who also played for Viking's junior team—and later for local clubs such as Sola, Vaulen, Vardeneset, Randaberg and Vidar.
