= 1958 in Norwegian football =

Football in Norway
- Season: 1958

Men's football
- Hovedserien: Viking
- Landsdelsserien: Greåker (Group East/South); Kapp (Group East/North); Jerv (Group South/West A1); Stavanger (Group South/West A2); Årstad (Group South/West B); Kristiansund (Group Møre); Freidig (Group Trøndelag)
- NM: Skeid

The 1958 season was the 53rd season of competitive football in Norway.

== 1957–58 league season ==
=== Hovedserien ===
==== Group A ====
Pos	Team	Pld	W	D	L	GF	GA	GD	Pts	Qualification or relegation
1	Viking (C)	14	9	3	2	32	14	+18	21	Qualification for the championship final
2	Larvik Turn	14	9	3	2	36	22	+14	21	
3	Strømmen	14	8	2	4	29	16	+13	18	
4	Brann	14	8	1	5	26	28	−2	17	
5	Raufoss	14	7	0	7	35	30	+5	14	
6	Odd	14	7	0	7	30	26	+4	14	
7	Frigg (R)	14	3	0	11	20	38	−18	6	Relegation to Landsdelsserien
8	Sparta (R)	14	0	1	13	10	44	−34	1	Relegation to Landsdelsserien

Source: RSSSF
(C) Champions; (R) Relegated

==== Group B ====
Pos	Team	Pld	W	D	L	GF	GA	GD	Pts	Qualification or relegation
1	Skeid	14	11	1	2	41	13	+28	23	Qualification for the championship final
2	Fredrikstad	14	9	3	2	45	18	+27	21	
3	Asker	14	6	5	3	36	26	+10	17	
4	Sandefjord	14	5	5	4	16	16	0	15	
5	Lillestrøm	14	6	1	7	34	32	+2	13	
6	Eik	14	5	3	6	22	27	−5	13	
7	Molde (R)	14	1	5	8	18	38	−20	7	Relegation to Landsdelsserien
8	Steinkjer (R)	14	1	1	12	17	59	−42	3	Relegation to Landsdelsserien

Source: RSSSF
(R) Relegated

=== Landsdelsserien ===
==== Group Østland/Søndre ====
Pos	Team	Pld	W	D	L	GF	GA	GD	Pts	Promotion or relegation
1	Greåker (P)	14	9	4	1	40	15	+25	22	Promotion to Hovedserien
2	Sarpsborg	14	8	2	4	27	12	+15	18	
3	Fram	14	7	3	4	29	30	−1	17	
4	Rapid	14	6	2	6	26	24	+2	14	
5	Moss	14	4	5	5	31	30	+1	13	
6	Selbak	14	4	3	7	21	23	−2	11	
7	Tønsberg Turn (R)	14	4	1	9	23	50	−27	9	Relegation to 3. divisjon
8	Lisleby (R)	14	2	4	8	24	37	−13	8	Relegation to 3. divisjon

Source: rsssf.no
Rules for classification: 1) points; 2) goal difference; 3) number of goals scored.
(P) Promoted; (R) Relegated

==== Group Østland/Nordre ====
Pos	Team	Pld	W	D	L	GF	GA	GD	Pts	Promotion or relegation
1	Kapp (P)	14	8	4	2	28	17	+11	20	Promotion to Hovedserien
2	Lyn	14	7	2	5	25	23	+2	16	
3	Vålerengen	14	6	3	5	24	16	+8	15	
4	Vestfossen	14	6	3	5	27	23	+4	15	
5	Fremad	14	4	6	4	29	27	+2	14	
6	Sandaker	14	4	5	5	18	22	−4	13	
7	Gjøvik-Lyn (R)	14	4	2	8	24	31	−7	10	Relegation to 3. divisjon
8	Mjøndalen (R)	14	3	3	8	24	40	−16	9	Relegation to 3. divisjon

Source: rsssf.no
Rules for classification: 1) points; 2) goal difference; 3) number of goals scored.
(P) Promoted; (R) Relegated

==== Group Sørland/Vestland, A1 ====
Pos	Team	Pld	W	D	L	GF	GA	GD	Pts	Qualification or relegation
1	Jerv	12	8	1	3	43	18	+25	17	Qualification for the promotion play-offs
2	Donn	12	7	3	2	34	20	+14	17	
3	Flekkefjord	12	6	2	4	25	24	+1	14	
4	Start	12	3	7	2	21	17	+4	13	
5	Grane	12	4	2	6	22	32	−10	10	
6	Sørfjell	12	4	1	7	26	29	−3	9	
7	Lyngdal (R)	12	1	2	9	20	51	−31	4	Relegation to 3. divisjon

Source: rsssf.no
Rules for classification: 1) points; 2) goal difference; 3) number of goals scored.
(R) Relegated

==== Group Sørland/Vestland, A2 ====
Pos	Team	Pld	W	D	L	GF	GA	GD	Pts	Qualification or relegation
1	Stavanger	14	9	3	2	39	14	+25	21	Qualification for the promotion play-offs
2	Ulf	14	6	7	1	29	16	+13	19	
3	Bryne	14	5	7	2	31	25	+6	17	
4	Vard	14	5	6	3	18	17	+1	16	
5	Djerv 1919	14	5	5	4	21	21	0	15	
6	Egersund	14	4	2	8	15	31	−16	10	
7	Jarl (R)	14	3	2	9	24	35	−11	8	Relegation to 3. divisjon
8	Ålgård (R)	14	1	4	9	16	34	−18	6	Relegation to 3. divisjon

Source: rsssf.no
Rules for classification: 1) points; 2) goal difference; 3) number of goals scored.
(R) Relegated

==== Group Sørland/Vestland, B ====
Pos	Team	Pld	W	D	L	GF	GA	GD	Pts	Qualification
1	Årstad (O, P)	12	8	3	1	43	19	+24	19	Qualification for the promotion play-offs
2	Varegg	12	8	2	2	30	23	+7	18	
3	Os	12	5	4	3	23	22	+1	14	
4	Nordnes	12	4	2	6	11	15	−4	10	
5	Baune	12	1	6	5	15	24	−9	8	
6	Hardy	12	3	2	7	13	26	−13	8	
7	Sandviken	12	1	5	6	18	24	−6	7	

Source: rsssf.no
Rules for classification: 1) points; 2) goal difference; 3) number of goals scored.
(O) Play-off winners; (P) Promoted

==== Group Møre ====
Pos	Team	Pld	W	D	L	GF	GA	GD	Pts	Qualification or relegation
1	Kristiansund	14	11	1	2	43	19	+24	23	Qualification for the promotion play-offs
2	Hødd	14	10	1	3	44	21	+23	21	
3	Clausenengen	14	8	1	5	38	27	+11	17	
4	Aalesund	14	7	3	4	22	16	+6	17	
5	Langevåg	14	7	0	7	32	24	+8	14	
6	Braatt (R)	14	6	2	6	25	29	−4	14	Relegation to 3. divisjon
7	Spjelkavik (R)	14	2	1	11	17	38	−21	5	Relegation to 3. divisjon
8	Rollon (R)	14	0	1	13	9	56	−47	1	Relegation to 3. divisjon

Source: rsssf.no
Rules for classification: 1) points; 2) goal difference; 3) number of goals scored.
(R) Relegated

==== Group Trøndelag ====
Pos	Team	Pld	W	D	L	GF	GA	GD	Pts	Qualification or relegation
1	Freidig (O, P)	14	10	3	1	41	11	+30	23	Qualification for the promotion play-offs
2	Kvik	14	10	2	2	32	16	+16	22	
3	Nessegutten	14	8	5	1	36	23	+13	21	
4	Brage	14	5	4	5	20	23	−3	14	
5	Verdal	14	6	1	7	26	35	−9	13	
6	Sverre	14	3	1	10	28	35	−7	7	
7	Stjørdals/Blink (R)	14	3	1	10	18	43	−25	7	Relegation to 3. divisjon
8	Rosenborg (R)	14	2	1	11	20	35	−15	5	Relegation to 3. divisjon

Source: rsssf.no
Rules for classification: 1) points; 2) goal difference; 3) number of goals scored.
(O) Play-off winners; (P) Promoted; (R) Relegated

===== Play-off Sørland/Vestland =====
- Jerv - Stavanger 3-2
- Jerv - Årstad 0-2

Årstad promoted.

===== Play-off Møre/Trøndelag =====
- Freidig - Kristiansund 3-1
- Kristiansund - Freidig 2-3 (agg. 3-6)

Freidig promoted.

=== Third Division ===
==== District I ====
1. Sprint/Jeløy Promoted 
2. Torp 
3. Kråkerøy 
4. Tune 
5. Mysen 
6. Hafslund 
7. Østsiden 
8. Rakkestad

==== District II, group A ====
1. Åssiden Play-off 
2. Drammens BK 
3. Røa 
4. Spartacus 
5. Geithus 
6. Slemmestad 
7. Jevnaker 
8. Sterling

==== District II, group B ====
1. Sagene Play-off 
2. Aurskog 
3. Grue 
4. Furuset 
5. Sørli 
6. Bjørkelangen 
7. Lillestrøm/Fram 
8. Grüner

==== District III, group A (Oplandene) ====
1. Lena Play-off 
2. Mesna 
3. Hamar IL 
4. Brumunddal 
5. Hamarkameratene 
6. Vardal 
7. Vang 
8. Skreia

==== District III, group B (Sør-Østerdal) ====
1. Koppang Play-off 
2. Innsats 
3. Elverum 
4. Lørdalen 
5. Engerdal 
6. Nybergsund 
7. Ytre Rendal

==== District IV, group A (Vestfold) ====
1. Ørn Play-off 
2. Falk 
3. Runar 
4. Sem 
5. Holmestrand 
6. Tønsbergkam. 
7. Teie 
8. Stag

==== District IV, group B (Grenland) ====
1. Pors Play-off 
2. Skiens-Grane 
3. Urædd 
4. Storm 
5. Herkules 
6. Kragerø 
7. Skiens BK 
8. Gjerpen

==== District IV, group C (Øvre Telemark) ====
1. Rjukan Play-off 
2. Snøgg 
3. Skade 
4. Ulefoss 
5. Drangedal 
6. Skarphedin

==== District V, group A1 (Aust-Agder) ====
1. Nedenes Play-off 
2. Rygene 
3. Dristug 
4. Risør 
5. Trauma 
6. Froland

==== District V, group A2 (Vest-Agder) ====
1. Vigør Play-off 
2. Mandalskam. 
3. Vindbjart 
4. Farsund 
5. Våg 
6. AIK Lund withdrew

==== District V, group B1 (Rogaland) ====
1. Nærbø Promoted 
2. Varhaug 
3. Klepp 
4. Vaulen 
5. Randaberg 
6. Riska

==== District V, group B2 (Rogaland) ====
1. Haugar Promoted 
2. Vidar 
3. Kopervik 
4. Buøy 
5. Åkra 
6. Torvastad

==== District VI, group A (Bergen) ====
1. Nymark Play-off 
2. Djerv 
3. Laksevåg 
4. Trane 
5. Bergens-Sparta 
6. Fjellkameratene 
7. Minde

==== District VI, group B (Midthordland) ====
1. Fana Play-off 
2. Voss 
3. Follese 
4. Erdal 
5. Florvåg 
6. Ålvik 
7. Arna

==== District VII, group A (Sunnmøre) ====
1. Volda Play-off 
2. Skarbøvik 
3. Herd 
4. Ørsta 
5. Velled./Ringen 
6. Aksla 
7. Sykkylven 
8. Hovdebygda

==== District VII, group B (Romsdal) ====
1. Åndalsnes Play-off 
2. Eidsvåg (Romsdal) 
3. Nord-Gossen 
4. Træff 
5. Eide 
6. Isfjorden 
7. Måndalen withdrew

==== District VII, group C (Sunnmøre) ====
1. Dahle Play-off 
2. Framtid 
3. Nordlandet 
4. Goma 
5. Sunndal 
6. Halsa 
7. Vågen 
8. Valsøyfjorden withdrew

==== District VIII, group A1 (Sør-Trøndelag) ====
1. Ranheim Play-off 
2. Flå 
3. Heimdal 
4. Melhus 
5. Støren 
6. Selbu

==== District VIII, group A2 (Nord-Trøndelag) ====
1. Orkanger Play-off 
2. Løkken 
3. Troll 
4. Svorkmo 
5. Rindal 
6. Dalguten withdrew

==== District VIII, group B (Trondheim og omegn) ====
1. Falken Play-off 
2. Tryggkameratene 
3. Trondheims/Ørn 
4. National 
5. Trond 
6. Nidelv 
7. Wing 
8. NTHI

==== District VIII, group C (Fosen) ====
1. Opphaug Play-off 
2. Fevåg 
3. Beian 
4. Stadsbygd 
5. Hasselvika 
6. Uthaug 
7. Lensvik withdrew

==== District VIII, group D (Nord-Trøndelag/Namdal) ====
1. Neset Play-off '
2. Bangsund 
3. Namsos 
4. Fram (Skatval) 
5. Snåsa 
6. Malm 
7. Leksvik 
8. Varden (Meråker) withdrew

==== District IX ====
1. Mo 
2. Bodø/Glimt 
3. Brønnøysund 
4. Stålkameratene 
5. Mosjøen 
6. Fauske/Sprint

==== District X (Unofficial) ====
1. Harstad 
2. Narvik/Nor 
3. Tromsø 
4. Mjølner 
5. Bardufoss/Omegn 
6. Finnsnes

===== Play-off District II =====
Sagene - Åssiden 2-2 
Åssiden - Sagene 1-4 (agg. 3-6) 
Sagene promoted.

===== Play-off District III =====
Lena - Koppang 9-1 
Koppang - Lena 2-6 (agg. 3-15) 
Lena promoted.

===== Play-off District IV =====
Rjukan - Pors 1-3 
Pors - Ørn 3-0 
Ørn - Rjukan 4-1

Pos	Team	Pld	W	D	L	GF	GA	GD	Pts	Promotion
1	Pors	2	2	0	0	6	1	+5	4	Promoted
2	Ørn	2	1	0	1	4	4	0	2	
3	Rjukan	2	0	0	2	2	7	−5	0	

===== Play-off District V =====
Nedenes - Vigør 2-0 
Vigør - Nedenes 2-3 (agg. 2-5) 
Nedenes promoted.

===== Championship District V =====
Nærbø - Haugar 2-2 
Haugar - Nærbø 0-0 (agg. 2-2) 
Nærbø - Haugar 2-2 (extra time)
Haugar - Nærbø 2-0 
Nedenes - Haugar not played

===== Play-off District VI =====
Fana - Nymark 1-0 
Nymark - Fana 1-0 (agg. 1-1) 
Fana - Nymark 1-2 Nymark promoted.

===== Play-off District VII =====
Volda - Dahle 3-1 
Dahle - Åndalsnes 3-0 
Åndalsnes - Volda 0-5

Pos	Team	Pld	W	D	L	GF	GA	GD	Pts	Promotion
1	Volda	2	2	0	0	8	1	+7	4	Promoted
2	Dahle	2	1	0	1	4	3	+1	2	Promoted
3	Åndalsnes	2	0	0	2	0	8	−8	0	

===== Play-off District VIII =====
Ranheim - Orkanger? 
Opphaug - Neset 0-2 
Ranheim - Falken 1-4 
Ranheim - Opphaug 2-4 
Falken - Neset 3-3 
Neset - Ranheim 4-0 
Falken - Opphaug 2-1

Pos	Team	Pld	W	D	L	GF	GA	GD	Pts	Promotion
1	Neset	3	2	1	0	9	3	+6	5	Promoted
2	Falken	3	2	1	0	9	5	+4	5	Promoted
3	Opphaug	3	1	0	2	5	6	−1	2	
4	Ranheim	3	0	0	3	3	12	−9	0	

== National Cup ==
=== Final ===
19 October 1958

Skeid	1–0	Lillestrøm
Tidemann 62'	Report

Ullevaal Stadion, Oslo
Attendance: 32,579
Referee: Birger Nilsen (Grüner)

== Northern Norwegian Cup ==
=== Final ===
Harstad	5–0	Bardufoss/Omegn
	Report

== National team ==
Date	Venue	Opponent	Res.*	Competition	Norwegian goalscorers
May 28	Oslo	Netherlands	0–0	Friendly	
June 15	Oslo	Finland	2–0	Friendly	Arne Pedersen, Harald Hennum
June 29	Copenhagen	Denmark	2–1	Friendly	Bjørn Borgen, Arne Pedersen
August 13	Oslo	East Germany	6–5	Friendly	Harald Hennum (4), Arne Pedersen (2)
September 14	Oslo	Sweden	0–2	Friendly	
November 2	Leipzig	East Germany	1–4	Friendly	Harald Hennum

Note: Norway's goals first
