= 1959 in Norwegian football =

Football in Norway
- Season: 1959

Men's football
- Hovedserien: Lillestrøm
- Landsdelsserien: Rapid (Group East/South); Vålerengen (Group East/North); Start (Group South/West A); Bryne (Group South/West B); Os (Group South/West C); Hødd (Group Møre); Brage (Group Trøndelag)
- NM: Viking

The 1959 season was the 54th season of competitive football in Norway.

== Hovedserien 1958/59 ==
=== Group A ===
Pos	Team	Pld	W	D	L	GF	GA	GD	Pts	Qualification or relegation
1	Fredrikstad	14	8	6	0	34	14	+20	22	Qualification for the championship final
2	Eik	14	7	4	3	26	15	+11	18	
3	Viking	14	7	3	4	25	17	+8	17	
4	Sandefjord	14	4	4	6	19	21	−2	12	
5	Brann	14	5	2	7	21	27	−6	12	
6	Greåker	14	4	4	6	19	25	−6	12	
7	Asker (R)	14	3	5	6	18	19	−1	11	Relegation to Landsdelsserien
8	Årstad (R)	14	3	2	9	12	36	−24	8	Relegation to Landsdelsserien

Source: RSSSF
(R) Relegated

=== Group B ===
Pos	Team	Pld	W	D	L	GF	GA	GD	Pts	Qualification or relegation
1	Lillestrøm (C)	14	9	1	4	36	25	+11	19	Qualification for the championship final
2	Larvik Turn	14	5	6	3	38	25	+13	16	
3	Strømmen	14	5	6	3	27	20	+7	16	
4	Skeid	14	6	3	5	28	18	+10	15	
5	Raufoss	14	5	5	4	24	19	+5	15	
6	Odd	14	5	3	6	23	29	−6	13	
7	Freidig (R)	14	5	2	7	34	38	−4	12	Relegation to Landsdelsserien
8	Kapp (R)	14	2	2	10	19	55	−36	6	Relegation to Landsdelsserien

Source: RSSSF
(C) Champions; (R) Relegated

=== Championship final ===
June 21: Lillestrøm - Fredrikstad 2-2 (extra time)

=== Championship final Rematch ===
August 5: Lillestrøm - Fredrikstad 4-1

== Landsdelsserien ==
=== Group Østland/Søndre ===
Pos	Team	Pld	W	D	L	GF	GA	GD	Pts	Promotion or relegation
1	Rapid (P)	14	7	6	1	23	13	+10	20	Promotion to Hovedserien
2	Selbak	14	7	4	3	34	21	+13	18	
3	Fram	14	6	5	3	24	23	+1	17	
4	Sarpsborg	14	6	4	4	28	15	+13	16	
5	Pors	14	6	4	4	31	21	+10	16	
6	Moss	14	6	4	4	23	20	+3	16	
7	Sparta	14	2	2	10	14	42	−28	6	
8	Sprint/Jeløy (R)	14	1	1	12	17	39	−22	3	Relegation to 3. divisjon

Source: rsssf.no
Rules for classification: 1) points; 2) goal difference; 3) number of goals scored.
(P) Promoted; (R) Relegated

=== Group Østland/Nordre ===
Pos	Team	Pld	W	D	L	GF	GA	GD	Pts	Promotion or relegation
1	Vålerengen (P)	14	10	4	0	43	10	+33	24	Promotion to Hovedserien
2	Frigg	14	11	1	2	38	22	+16	23	
3	Lyn	14	8	1	5	29	21	+8	17	
4	Sandaker	14	7	2	5	23	18	+5	16	
5	Sagene	14	5	2	7	20	29	−9	12	
6	Vestfossen (R)	14	3	3	8	32	37	−5	9	Relegation to 3. divisjon
7	Fremad (R)	14	3	1	10	25	45	−20	7	Relegation to 3. divisjon
8	Lena (R)	14	1	2	11	24	52	−28	4	Relegation to 3. divisjon

Source: rsssf.no
Rules for classification: 1) points; 2) goal difference; 3) number of goals scored.
(P) Promoted; (R) Relegated

=== Group Sørland/Vestland, A ===
Pos	Team	Pld	W	D	L	GF	GA	GD	Pts	Qualification
1	Start (O, P)	12	12	0	0	48	18	+30	24	Qualification for the promotion play-offs
2	Donn	12	7	2	3	30	21	+9	16	
3	Jerv	12	6	1	5	36	27	+9	13	
4	Grane	12	5	2	5	24	23	+1	12	
5	Flekkefjord	12	4	2	6	23	32	−9	10	
6	Nedenes	12	2	1	9	22	42	−20	5	
7	Sørfjell	12	2	0	10	20	40	−20	4	

Source: rsssf.no
Rules for classification: 1) points; 2) goal difference; 3) number of goals scored.
(O) Play-off winners; (P) Promoted

=== Group Sørland/Vestland, B ===
Pos	Team	Pld	W	D	L	GF	GA	GD	Pts	Qualification or relegation
1	Bryne	14	8	4	2	31	17	+14	20	Qualification for the promotion play-offs
2	Haugar	14	7	3	4	20	11	+9	17	
3	Egersund	14	5	5	4	22	23	−1	15	
4	Stavanger	14	6	2	6	37	26	+11	14	
5	Djerv 1919	14	6	1	7	19	28	−9	13	
6	Vard	14	4	4	6	22	21	+1	12	
7	Ulf (R)	14	5	2	7	18	26	−8	12	Relegation to 3. divisjon
8	Nærbø (R)	14	3	3	8	17	34	−17	9	Relegation to 3. divisjon

Source: rsssf.no
Rules for classification: 1) points; 2) goal difference; 3) number of goals scored.
(R) Relegated

=== Group Sørland/Vestland, C ===
Pos	Team	Pld	W	D	L	GF	GA	GD	Pts	Qualification or relegation
1	Os	12	10	1	1	36	14	+22	21	Qualification for the promotion play-offs
2	Sandviken	12	5	4	3	23	21	+2	14	
3	Varegg	12	6	2	4	18	18	0	14	
4	Nymark	12	4	5	3	16	13	+3	13	
5	Nordnes	12	5	2	5	10	14	−4	12	
6	Hardy (R)	12	1	3	8	10	19	−9	5	Relegation to 3. divisjon
7	Baune (R)	12	1	3	8	10	24	−14	5	Relegation to 3. divisjon

Source: rsssf.no
Rules for classification: 1) points; 2) goal difference; 3) number of goals scored.
(R) Relegated

=== Group Møre ===
Pos	Team	Pld	W	D	L	GF	GA	GD	Pts	Qualification or relegation
1	Hødd	14	10	3	1	51	16	+35	23	Qualification for the promotion play-offs
2	Kristiansund	14	9	2	3	44	11	+33	20	
3	Aalesund	14	7	5	2	22	20	+2	19	
4	Molde	14	6	3	5	33	26	+7	15	
5	Langevåg	14	4	4	6	24	33	−9	12	
6	Clausenengen	14	4	4	6	27	39	−12	12	
7	Volda (R)	14	3	2	9	27	49	−22	8	Relegation to 3. divisjon
8	Dahle (R)	14	1	1	12	14	48	−34	3	Relegation to 3. divisjon

Source: rsssf.no
Rules for classification: 1) points; 2) goal difference; 3) number of goals scored.
(R) Relegated

=== Group Trøndelag ===
Pos	Team	Pld	W	D	L	GF	GA	GD	Pts	Qualification or relegation
1	Brage (O, P)	14	7	5	2	25	17	+8	19	Qualification for the promotion play-offs
2	Nessegutten	14	7	3	4	31	23	+8	17	
3	Kvik	14	5	5	4	25	18	+7	15	
4	Steinkjer	14	6	3	5	25	25	0	15	
5	Neset	14	6	3	5	22	24	−2	15	
6	Sverre	14	5	3	6	23	24	−1	13	
7	Verdal (R)	14	4	5	5	25	28	−3	13	Relegation to 3. divisjon
8	Falken (R)	14	2	1	11	13	30	−17	5	Relegation to 3. divisjon

Source: rsssf.no
Rules for classification: 1) points; 2) goal difference; 3) number of goals scored.
(O) Play-off winners; (P) Promoted; (R) Relegated

=== Play-off Sørland/Vestland ===
- Bryne - Start 0-2
- Start - Os 2-0
- Os - Bryne 4-0

Pos	Team	Pld	W	D	L	GF	GA	GD	Pts	Qualification
1	Start (O, P)	2	2	0	0	4	0	+4	4	Promotion to Hovedserien
2	Os	2	1	0	1	4	2	+2	2	Remained in Landsdelsserien
3	Bryne	2	0	0	2	0	6	−6	0	Remained in Landsdelsserien

Source: rsssf.no
Rules for classification: 1) points; 2) goal difference; 3) number of goals scored.
(O) Play-off winners; (P) Promoted

=== Play-off Møre/Trøndelag ===
- Hødd - Brage 2-3
- Brage - Hødd 5-3 (agg. 8–5)

Brage promoted.

== Third Division ==
=== District I ===
1. Lisleby Promoted 
2. Mysen 
3. Gresvik 
4. Askim 
5. Tune 
6. Hafslund 
7. Kråkerøy 
8. Torp

=== District II, group A ===
1. Mjøndalen Play-off 
2. Drammens BK 
3. Åssiden 
4. Geithus 
5. Slemmestad 
6. Røa 
7. Tofte 
8. Bjølsen

=== District II, group B ===
1. Aurskog Play-off 
2. Grue 
3. Spartacus 
4. Bjørkelangen 
5. Ski 
6. Sørli 
7. Galterud 
8. Furuset

=== District III, group A (Oplandene) ===
1. Gjøvik/Lyn Play-off 
2. Hamar IL Mesna 
3. Gjøvik SK 
4. Hamarkameratene 
5. Brumunddal 
6. Stavsjø 
7. Vardal

=== District III, group B (Sør-Østerdal) ===
1. Nybergsund Play-off 
2. Elverum 
3. Trysilgutten 
4. Koppang 
5. Innsats 
6. Engerdal 
7. Lørdalen

=== District III, group C (Sør-Gudbrandsdal) ===
Kvam Play-off 
Table unknown.

=== District III, group D (Nord-Gudbrandsdal) ===
1. Dovre Play-off 
2. Otta 
3. Lesja 
4. Dombås 
5. Sel 
6. Faukstad

=== District IV, group A (Vestfold) ===
1. Ørn Play-off 
2. Runar 
3. Holmestrand 
4. Tønsberg 
5. Turn 
6. Falk 
7. Borre 
8. Tønsbergkam. 
9. Sem

=== District IV, group B (Grenland) ===
1. Urædd Play-off 
2. Kragerø 
3. Storm 
4. Skidar 
5. Skiens-Grane 
6. Herkules 
7. Skiens BK 
8. Borg

=== District IV, group B (Øvre Telemark) ===
1. Snøgg Play-off 
2. Rjukan 
3. Skade 
4. Drangedal 
5. Ulefoss 
6. Sportsklubben 31

=== District V, group A1 (Aust-Agder) ===
1. Rygene Play-off 
2. Dristug 
3. Risør 
4. Arendals BK 
5. Froland 
6. Trauma

=== District V, group A2 (Vest-Agder) ===
1. Vindbjart Play-off 
2. Mandalskam. 
3. Lyngdal 
4. Vigør 
5. Torridal 
6. Farsund disqualified

=== District V, group B1 (Rogaland) ===
1. Vidar Play-off 
2. Buøy 
3. Vaulen 
4. Klepp 
5. Ålgård 
6. Sandnes AIF

=== District V, group B2 (Rogaland) ===
1. Kopervik Play-off 
2. Jarl 
3. Randaberg 
4. Åkra 
5. Varhaug 
6. Nord

=== District V, group C (Sunnhordland) ===
1. Odda Play-off 
2. Stord 
3. Halsnøy 
4. Solid 
5. Rubbestadnes 
6. Skånevik

=== District VI, group A (Bergen) ===
1. Fjellkameratene Play-off
2. Djerv
3. Trane
4. Laksevåg
5. Bergens-Sparta
6. Minde
7. Viggo

=== District VI, group B (Midthordland) ===
1. Fana Play-off 
2. Erdal 
3. Follese 
4. Florvåg 
5. Voss 
6. Kjøkkelvik

=== District VII, group A (Sunnmøre) ===
1. Skarbøvik Play-off 
2. Herd 
3. Spjelkavik 
4. Rollon 
5. Ørsta 
6. Velled./Ringen 
7. Bergsøy 
8. Stranda

=== District VII, group B (Romsdal) ===
1. Nord-Gossen Play-off 
2. Eidsvåg (Romsdal) 
3. Træff 
4. Åndalsnes 
5. Isfjorden 
6. Eide 
7. Olymp

=== District VII, group C (Nordmøre) ===
1. Braatt Play-off 
2. Framtid 
3. Bjørn 
4. Nordlandet 
5. Sunndal 
6. Goma 
7. Enge 
8. Halsa

=== District VIII, group A1 (Sør-Trøndelag) ===
1. Ranheim Play-off 
2. Flå 
3. Vikavarvet 
4. Heimdal 
5. Melhus 
6. Støren

=== District VIII, group A2 (Sør-Trøndelag) ===
1. Løkken Play-off 
2. Svorkmo 
3. Troll 
4. Orkanger 
5. Rindal 
6. Nor

=== District VIII, group B (Trondheim og omegn) ===
1. Rosenborg Play-off 
2. Tryggkameratene 
3. Trond 
4. Trondheims/Ørn 
5. National 
6. Nidar 
7. Nidelv 
8. Rapp

=== District VIII, group C (Fosen) ===
1. Stadsbygd Play-off 
2. Beian 
3. Fevåg 
4. Brekstad 
5. Opphaug 
6. Hasselvika 
7. Uthaug withdrew

=== District VIII, group D (Nord-Trøndelag/Namdal) ===
1. Snåsa Play-off 
2. Stjørdals/Blink 
3. Fram (Skatval) 
4. Namsos 
5. Malm 
6. Bangsund 
7. Sprova 
8. Aasguten

=== District IX ===
1. Bodø/Glimt 
2. Mo 
3. Stålkameratene  
4. Brønnøysund 
5. Mosjøen 
6. Sandnessjøen

=== District X ===
1. Harstad 
2. Tromsø 
3. Narvik/Nor 
4. Mjølner 
5. Lia-Brage 
6. Bardufoss/Omegn

=== Play-off District II ===
- Mjøndalen - Aurskog 1-0
- Aurskog - Mjøndalen 0-2 (agg. 0–3)
- Mjøndalen promoted.

=== Play-off District III ===
- Kvam - Dovre 6-0
- Nybergsund - Kvam 3-0
- Dovre - Nybergsund 3-5

Team	Pld	W	D	L	GF	GA	GD	Pts	Qualification
Nybergsund	2	2	0	0	8	3	+5	4	Play-off
Kvam	2	1	0	1	6	3	+3	2	
Dovre	2	0	0	2	3	11	−8	0	

- Nybergsund - Gjøvik/Lyn 0-4
- Gjøvik/Lyn - Nybergsund 13-0 (agg. 17–0)
- Gjøvik/Lyn promoted.

=== Play-off District IV ===
- Ørn - Urædd 4-4
- Urædd - Snøgg 0-0
- Snøgg - Ørn 2-1

Team	Pld	W	D	L	GF	GA	GD	Pts	Promotion
Snøgg	2	1	1	0	2	1	+1	3	Promoted
Urædd	2	0	2	0	4	4	0	2	
Ørn	2	0	1	1	5	6	−1	1	

=== Play-off District V ===
- Vindbjart - Rygene 3-1
- Rygene - Vindbjart 0-7 (agg. 1–10)
- Vindbjart promoted.
- Kopervik - Vidar 1-0
- Vidar - Kopervik 4-4 (agg. 4–5)
- Kopervik promoted.
- Vidar - Odda 3-0 (in Haugesund) Vidar promoted.

=== Championship District V ===
- Vindbjart - Kopervik not played

=== Play-off District VI ===
- Fjellkameratene - Fana 4-5
- Fana - Fjellkameratene 6-1 (agg. 11–5)
- Fana promoted.

=== Play-off District VII ===
- Skarbøvik - Nord-Gossen 6-1
- Nord-Gossen - Braatt 1-5
- Braatt - Skarbøvik 4-2

Pos	Team	Pld	W	D	L	GF	GA	GD	Pts	Promotion
1	Braatt	2	2	0	0	9	3	+6	4	Promoted
2	Skarbøvik	2	1	0	1	8	5	+3	2	Promoted
3	Nord-Gossen	2	0	0	2	2	11	−9	0	

=== Play-off District VIII ===
- Ranheim - Løkken?
- Snåsa - Stadsbygd 2-2
- Rosenborg - Ranheim 1-2
- Rosenborg - Snåsa 6-1
- Ranheim - Stadsbygd 5-0
- Ranheim - Snåsa 5-4
- Stadsbygd - Rosenborg 0-5

Pos	Team	Pld	W	D	L	GF	GA	GD	Pts	Promotion
1	Ranheim	3	3	0	0	12	5	+7	6	Promoted
2	Rosenborg	3	2	0	1	12	3	+9	4	Promoted
3	Snåsa	3	0	1	2	7	13	−6	1	
4	Stadsbygd	3	0	1	2	2	12	−10	1	

== Norwegian Cup ==
=== Final ===
25 October 1959

Viking	2–1 (a.e.t.)	Sandefjord BK
Bjørnsen 16'; Hult 97'	Report	Kristiansen 30'

Ullevaal Stadion, Oslo
Attendance: 28,195
Referee: Trygve Dahlgren (Urædd)

== Northern Norwegian Cup ==
=== Final ===
Narvik/Nor	2–1	Harstad
	Report

== National team ==
Date	Venue	Opponent	Res.*	Comp.	Norwegian goalscorers
May 20	Oslo	Austria	0-1	EC 1/8 final	
June 17	Oslo	Luxembourg	1-0	F	Harald Hennum
June 28	Helsinki	Finland	4-2	F	Harald Hennum (2), Bjørn Borgen, Ragnar Lasen
July 2	Copenhagen	Denmark	1-2	OGQ	Rolf Birger Pedersen
July 7	Reykjavík	Iceland	0-1	OGQ	
August 21	Oslo	Iceland	2-1	OGQ	Rolf Bjørn Backe, Kjell Kristiansen
September 13	Oslo	Denmark	2-4	OGQ	Åge Sørensen, Kjell Kristiansen
September 23	Vienna	Austria	2-5	EC 1/8 final	
October 18	Gothenburg	Sweden	2-6	F	Rolf Bjørn Backe, Harald Hennum
November 4	Rotterdam	Netherlands	1-7	F	Per Kristoffersen

Note: Norway's goals first
Explanation:

- F = Friendly
- EC = European championship
- OGQ = Olympic Games Qualifier
