= 1959 Norwegian Football Cup =

Norgesmesterskapet i fotball for menn 1959

Tournament details
- Country: Norway
- Teams: 128 (main competition)

Final positions
- Champions: Viking (2nd title)
- Runners-up: Sandefjord BK

The 1959 Norwegian Football Cup was the 54th season of the Norwegian annual knockout football tournament. The tournament was open for all members of NFF, except those from Northern Norway. Skeid was the defending champions, but was eliminated by the second-tier team Nessegutten in the fourth round.

The final was played at Ullevaal Stadion in Oslo on 25 October 1959, and was contested by Viking, which had won the cup once in 1953, and Sandefjord BK who played their second cup final, having lost the final in 1957. Viking won 2-1 after extra time against Sandefjord in the final, and secured their second title.

== First round ==
Team 1	Score	Team 2
Asker	6–0	Åsen
Aurskog	1–2	Greåker
Bangsund	0–3	Nessegutten
Baune	0–4	Sandviken
Biri	0–3	Gjøvik-Lyn
Bryne	6–1	Klepp
Dahle	2–1	Molde
Djerv	2–1 (a.e.t.)	Varegg
Drøbak/Frogn	0–4	Sarpsborg
Egersund	2–1	Stavanger
Eik	3–2	Kongsberg
Fana	0–5	Brann
Fossekallen	2–4	Vålerengen
Fram (Larvik)	3–1	Borg
Fredrikstad	11–1	Ski
Freidig	3–1	Falken
Gjøvik SK	1–5	Raufoss
Hafslund	0–2	Frigg
Hamar	2–1	Sagene
Hardy	0–3	Årstad
Hødd	1–0	Måløy
Jarl	4–2	Haugar
Jerv	1–2	Storm
Jevnaker	4–2	Tønsberg Turn
Kapp	5–1	Stavsjø
Kjellmyra	2–7 (a.e.t.)	Strømmen
Kragerø	2–1	Grane (Arendal)
Kvik (Trondheim)	7–1	Clausenengen
Langevåg	3–3 (a.e.t.)	Volda
Lena	2–8	Brumunddal
Lillestrøm	11–2	Namnå
Lyn	11–0	Bjørkelangen
Mesna	0–2	Fremad Lillehammer
Mjøndalen	7–0	Falk
Moss	7–1	Drafn
Nedenes	1–0	Donn
Neset	3–1	Stjørdals-Blink
Nymark	2–1	Sogndal
Odda	0–6	Djerv 1919
Os	3–1	Nordnes
Pors	5–0	Sørfjell
Rapid	3–0	Østsiden
Runar	2–0	Drammens BK
Sandaker	2–0 (a.e.t.)	HamKam
Selbak	5–0	Navestad
Skeid	2–1	Sand
Skiens BK	0–2	Odd
Skiens-Grane	2–0	Ulefoss
Snøgg	3–2	Urædd
Sparta	1–0	Lisleby
Start	6–3	Vigør
Steinkjer	5–4	Tryggkam
Sverre	1–0	Ranheim
Træff	2–9	Kristiansund
Tynset	1–0	Brage
Tønsberg-Kameratene	0–4	Larvik Turn
Vard	2–1	Ulf
Verdal	0–2	Rosenborg
Vestfossen	2–1	Spartacus
Viking	5–0	Nærbø
Vindbjart	2–2 (a.e.t.)	Flekkefjord
Ørn	5–0	Sprint-Jeløy
Aalesund	1–0 (a.e.t.)	Skarbøvik
Åssiden	0–1 (a.e.t.)	Sandefjord BK
Replay
Flekkefjord	4–0	Vindbjart
Volda	0–4	Langevåg

== Second round ==
Team 1	Score	Team 2
Asker	2–1	Sparta
Brann	2–1	Nymark
Brumunddal	0–4	Kapp
Djerv 1919	1–2	Bryne
Egersund	0–2	Jarl
Eik	6–0	Runar
Flekkefjord	0–1	Start
Fremad Lillehammer	6–1	Sverre
Frigg	2–0	Moss
Gjøvik-Lyn	3–2	Vestfossen
Greåker	5–1	Fram (Larvik)
Hamar	1–2	Lyn
Hødd	4–0	Langevåg
Kristiansund	3–1	Dahle
Kvik (Trondheim)	2–1 (a.e.t.)	Aalesund
Larvik Turn	5–2	Skiens-Grane
Nessegutten	4–0	Tynset
Odd	4–0	Nedenes
Os	0–1	Djerv
Rapid	1–2	Lillestrøm
Raufoss	6–1	Jevnaker
Rosenborg	2–1	Neset
Sandefjord BK	4–1	Kragerø
Sandviken	1–4	Årstad
Sarpsborg	0–2	Sandaker
Snøgg	1–2	Skeid
Steinkjer	3–1	Freidig
Storm	1–4	Fredrikstad
Strømmen	2–1	Mjøndalen
Viking	3–2	Vard
Vålerengen	0–1	Selbak
Ørn	4–4 (a.e.t.)	Pors
Replay
Pors	3–2	Ørn

== Third round ==
Team 1	Score	Team 2
9 August 1959
Selbak	0–0 (a.e.t.)	Sandefjord BK
Fredrikstad	1–3	Nessegutten
Sandaker	3–0	Årstad
Skeid	7–2	Steinkjer
Lillestrøm	5–2	Kvik (Trondheim)
Kapp	3–2	Lyn
Eik	1–4	Gjøvik-Lyn
Larvik Turn	5–0	Fremad Lillehammer
Pors	2–1 (a.e.t.)	Strømmen
Start	0–1	Frigg
Bryne	3–3 (a.e.t.)	Odd
Jarl	2–5	Brann
Djerv	0–2	Viking
Hødd	1–3	Greåker
Kristiansund	0–1	Asker
Rosenborg	1–0	Raufoss
Replay: 12 August 1959
Sandefjord BK	2–1	Selbak
Odd	5–0	Bryne

== Fourth round ==
Team 1	Score	Team 2
30 August 1959
Greåker	1–0	Rosenborg
Frigg	3–2 (a.e.t.)	Lillestrøm
Asker	0–3	Larvik Turn
Gjøvik-Lyn	0–1	Sandefjord BK
Odd	3–0	Kapp
Viking	1–0	Pors
Brann	2–2 (a.e.t.)	Sandaker
Nessegutten	1–0	Skeid
Replay: 2 September 1959
Sandaker	0–2	Brann

== Quarter-finals ==
Team 1	Score	Team 2
20 September 1959
Viking	1–1 (a.e.t.)	Nessegutten
Brann	0–3	Greåker
Sandefjord BK	3–1	Larvik Turn
Odd	2–1	Frigg
Replay: 27 September 1959
Nessegutten	0–4	Viking

== Semi-finals ==
Team 1	Score	Team 2
4 October 1959
Viking	4–0	Odd
Greåker	0–2	Sandefjord BK

== Final ==
25 October 1959
13:00 CET (UTC+1)

Viking	2–1 (a.e.t.)	Sandefjord BK
Bjørnsen 16'; Hult 97'	Report	Kristiansen 30'

Ullevaal Stadion, Oslo
Attendance: 28,195
Referee: Trygve Dahlgren (Urædd)

Viking:
Sverre Andersen
Otto Hermansen
Leif Nicolaisen
Kåre Bjørnsen
Edgar Falch
Sigurd Wold
Rolf Bjørnsen
Olav Nilsen
Åsbjørn Skjærpe
Gustav Hult
Hans Andersen

Sandefjord BK:
Per Einan
Kjell Østby
Yngve Karlsen
Ernst Norli
Thorbjørn Svenssen
Carl Thuve
Rolf Johansen
Hans Sperre
Erik Kristiansen
Arild Havnaas
Gunnar Guthu

== See also ==
- 1958–59 Norwegian Main League
- 1959 in Norwegian football
