= Erik Johannessen (footballer, born 1952) =

Norwegian footballer

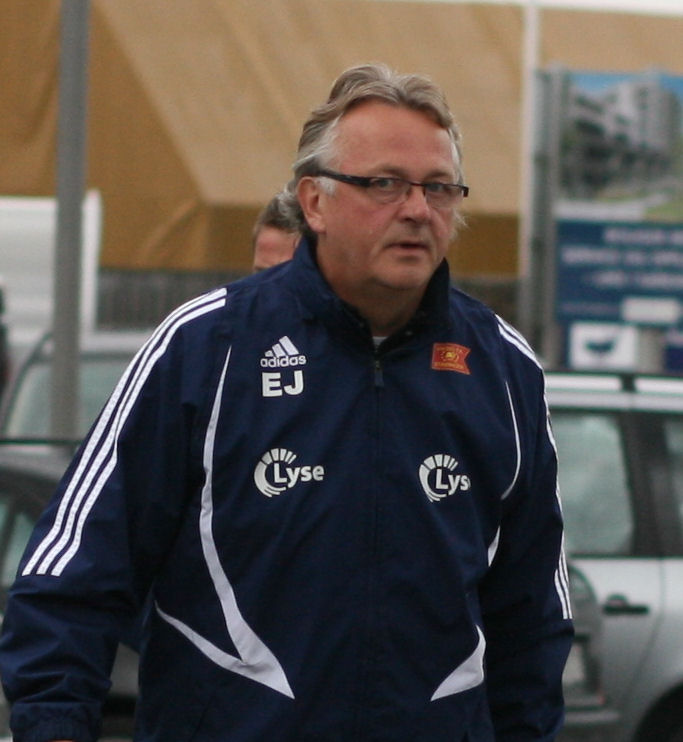
- Erik Johannessen in 2007

Personal information
- Full name: Erik Hjorth Johannessen
- Date of birth: 20 March 1952 (age 74)
- Place of birth: Stavanger, Norway
- Position: Goalkeeper

Senior career*
| Years | Team | Apps | (Gls) |
| 1971–1983 | Viking | 245 | (0) |
| Total | | 245 | (0) |

International career
| 1968–1970 | Norway U-19 | 11 | (0) |
| 1972–1975 | Norway U-21 | 8 | (0) |
| 1975 | Norway | 6 | (0) |
- * Club domestic league appearances and goals

Erik Johannessen (born 20 March 1952) is a Norwegian former footballer who played as a goalkeeper for Viking between 1971 and 1983. He won the Norwegian league six times and earned six caps while playing for Norway. Johannessen has later been a part of Viking coaching-staff as a goalkeeping-coach.

== Club career ==
Johannessen was born in Stavanger and started his career in Viking in 1971, where he soon became Sverre Andersen's successor as the first-choice goalkeeper. Johannessen was a part of Viking's golden generation that won four consecutive Norwegian league championships between 1972 and 1975, and he was voted Viking-player of the year in both 1974 and 1975. Johannessen also kept a clean sheet for 672 minutes in the 1974 1. divisjon. As of the end of the 2012 season, this is still the record in the top league of Norway, with Kenneth Udjus 557 minutes from 2011 and 2012 as the second-longest clean sheet.

Johannessen also won the league with Viking in 1979 and 1982, and is with his six championship the most-winning Viking-player of all times. His last match for Viking was the 2–9 loss against Brann in the last match of the 1983 season. He played 245 league-matches for Viking between 1971 and 1983, and with 501 matches for Viking, including friendlies, he is the Viking-player with third most appearances for the club, behind Svein Kvia and Sigbjørn Slinning.

== International career ==
Johannessen played 11 matches for the Norway under-19 team between 1968 and 1970, before he played 8 matches for the under-21 team between 1972 and 1975. He made his debut for the senior team against Finland on 15 May 1975, and was capped a total of 6 times playing for Norway.

== Coaching career ==
Johannessen was working as Benny Lennartsson's goalkeeping-coach at Viking in 1989 and 1990. He later worked as goalkeeping-coach at Hinna before he was coaching Viking's youth-team. He was also working as a teacher at Kristianlyst Ungdomskole, but left this job when he replaced Kurt Hegre as Viking's goalkeeping-coach ahead of the 2007 season. He quit the job in the coaching staff after the 2010 season, and joined Viking's administrative staff before he returned to his teacher-job from 1 January 2012 and became Jørn Øvrebø's assistant coach at Hinna in the 3. divisjon.

== Personal life ==
Johannessen had two daughters, Josefine and Martine, and was married to Brit Tone who died from cancer in 2011. Four days after his wife's burial, he got a large rift in the aorta. The doctors claimed he had a 50% chance of surviving, but Johannessen recovered after a ten-hour-long surgery at Haukeland Sykehus.
