= Trond Bjørnsen =

Norwegian footballer (born 1975)

Personal information
- Date of birth: 24 August 1975 (age 51)
- Height: 1.78 m (5 ft 10 in)
- Position: Midfielder

Youth career
- –1992: Vidar
- 1993: Viking

Senior career*
Years	Team	Apps	(Gls)
1994–1995	Viking	2	(0)
1996–1997	Vidar		
1998–1999	Lillestrøm	20	(3)
2000–2003	Bryne	72	(5)
2004	Rosseland		
- * Club domestic league appearances and goals

Trond Bjørnsen (born 24 August 1975) is a retired Norwegian football midfielder. He played in the Eliteserien for Viking FK, Lillestrøm SK and Bryne FK.

He played youth football for FK Vidar and Viking FK, being drafted into Viking's senior team in 1994 alongside four other players: Trond Kindervåg, Bjarte Lunde Aarsheim, Erik Fuglestad and Trond Debes. The quintet had apprentice status. Never managing to break through, he continued in the city's second-best club FK Vidar from 1996.

In early 1997, Bjørnsen was back in Viking on trial. After the trial, Viking met Vidar in a friendly match with Bjørnsen scoring. He started training with Lillestrøm SK in the fall of 1997. The transfer to Lillestrøm went through in October 1997. He was the best Lillestrøm player in a lactate test performed by Olympiatoppen in He could play central or left midfielder, competing with Runar Normann and Leif Gunnar Smerud.

Following a knee injury just before the start of the 1998 Eliteserien, Bjørnsen had to wait until July 1998 to make his Lillestrøm debut. In his first home match, he almost scored, but his effort was barely saved by Clas Guttulsrød.

In 1999, Bjørnsen was sidelined from the Lillestrøm team. Already in January, he was told that he was not considered as a starting player, with Runar Kristinsson and Magnus Kihlberg occupying central midfield. He was allowed to start in the cup, where he scored twice; in the second round, Bjørnsen put Lillestrøm through in a 1–0 victory over Faaberg.

In the fall of 1999, Bjørnsen was asked to leave Lillestrøm despite having two years left of his contract. In November he decided to move back to Rogaland and Bryne FK. Bjørnsen played for Bryne from 2000 to 2003. After the 2003 season, he retired to focus on law studies. In the summer of 2004 he nonetheless made a comeback for minnows Rosseland BK.
