= 1957–58 Landsdelsserien =

Landsdelsserien
- Season: 1957–58
- Promoted: Greåker; Kapp; Årstad; Freidig
- Relegated: Tønsberg Turn; Lisleby; Gjøvik-Lyn; Mjøndalen; Lyngdal; Jarl; Ålgård; Braatt; Spjelkavik; Rollon; Stjørdals/Blink; Rosenborg

The 1957–58 Landsdelsserien was a Norwegian second-tier football league season.

The league was contested by 54 teams, divided into a total of seven groups from four districts; Østland/Søndre, Østland/Nordre, Sørland/Vestre and Møre/Trøndelag. The two group winners in the Østland districts, Greåker and Kapp promoted directly to the 1958–59 Hovedserien. The other five group winners qualified for promotion play-offs to compete for two spots in the following season's top flight. Årstad and Freidig won the play-offs and were promoted.

== Tables ==
=== District Østland/Søndre ===
| Pos | Team | Pld | W | D | L | GF | GA | GD | Pts | Promotion or relegation |
|---|---|---|---|---|---|---|---|---|---|---|
| 1 | Greåker (P) | 14 | 9 | 4 | 1 | 40 | 15 | +25 | 22 | Promotion to Hovedserien |
| 2 | Sarpsborg | 14 | 8 | 2 | 4 | 27 | 12 | +15 | 18 | |
| 3 | Fram | 14 | 7 | 3 | 4 | 29 | 30 | −1 | 17 | |
| 4 | Rapid | 14 | 6 | 2 | 6 | 26 | 24 | +2 | 14 | |
| 5 | Moss | 14 | 4 | 5 | 5 | 31 | 30 | +1 | 13 | |
| 6 | Selbak | 14 | 4 | 3 | 7 | 21 | 23 | −2 | 11 | |
| 7 | Tønsberg Turn (R) | 14 | 4 | 1 | 9 | 23 | 50 | −27 | 9 | Relegation to 3. divisjon |
| 8 | Lisleby (R) | 14 | 2 | 4 | 8 | 24 | 37 | −13 | 8 | Relegation to 3. divisjon |

Source: rsssf.no
Rules for classification: 1) points; 2) goal difference; 3) number of goals scored.
(P) Promoted; (R) Relegated

=== District Østland/Nordre ===
| Pos | Team | Pld | W | D | L | GF | GA | GD | Pts | Promotion or relegation |
|---|---|---|---|---|---|---|---|---|---|---|
| 1 | Kapp (P) | 14 | 8 | 4 | 2 | 28 | 17 | +11 | 20 | Promotion to Hovedserien |
| 2 | Lyn | 14 | 7 | 2 | 5 | 25 | 23 | +2 | 16 | |
| 3 | Vålerengen | 14 | 6 | 3 | 5 | 24 | 16 | +8 | 15 | |
| 4 | Vestfossen | 14 | 6 | 3 | 5 | 27 | 23 | +4 | 15 | |
| 5 | Fremad | 14 | 4 | 6 | 4 | 29 | 27 | +2 | 14 | |
| 6 | Sandaker | 14 | 4 | 5 | 5 | 18 | 22 | −4 | 13 | |
| 7 | Gjøvik-Lyn (R) | 14 | 4 | 2 | 8 | 24 | 31 | −7 | 10 | Relegation to 3. divisjon |
| 8 | Mjøndalen (R) | 14 | 3 | 3 | 8 | 24 | 40 | −16 | 9 | Relegation to 3. divisjon |

Source: rsssf.no
Rules for classification: 1) points; 2) goal difference; 3) number of goals scored.
(P) Promoted; (R) Relegated

=== District Sørland/Vestland ===
==== Group A1 ====
| Pos | Team | Pld | W | D | L | GF | GA | GD | Pts | Qualification or relegation |
|---|---|---|---|---|---|---|---|---|---|---|
| 1 | Jerv | 12 | 8 | 1 | 3 | 43 | 18 | +25 | 17 | Qualification for the promotion play-offs |
| 2 | Donn | 12 | 7 | 3 | 2 | 34 | 20 | +14 | 17 | |
| 3 | Flekkefjord | 12 | 6 | 2 | 4 | 25 | 24 | +1 | 14 | |
| 4 | Start | 12 | 3 | 7 | 2 | 21 | 17 | +4 | 13 | |
| 5 | Grane | 12 | 4 | 2 | 6 | 22 | 32 | −10 | 10 | |
| 6 | Sørfjell | 12 | 4 | 1 | 7 | 26 | 29 | −3 | 9 | |
| 7 | Lyngdal (R) | 12 | 1 | 2 | 9 | 20 | 51 | −31 | 4 | Relegation to 3. divisjon |

Source: rsssf.no
Rules for classification: 1) points; 2) goal difference; 3) number of goals scored.
(R) Relegated

==== Group A2 ====
| Pos | Team | Pld | W | D | L | GF | GA | GD | Pts | Qualification or relegation |
|---|---|---|---|---|---|---|---|---|---|---|
| 1 | Stavanger | 14 | 9 | 3 | 2 | 39 | 14 | +25 | 21 | Qualification for the promotion play-offs |
| 2 | Ulf | 14 | 6 | 7 | 1 | 29 | 16 | +13 | 19 | |
| 3 | Bryne | 14 | 5 | 7 | 2 | 31 | 25 | +6 | 17 | |
| 4 | Vard | 14 | 5 | 6 | 3 | 18 | 17 | +1 | 16 | |
| 5 | Djerv 1919 | 14 | 5 | 5 | 4 | 21 | 21 | 0 | 15 | |
| 6 | Egersund | 14 | 4 | 2 | 8 | 15 | 31 | −16 | 10 | |
| 7 | Jarl (R) | 14 | 3 | 2 | 9 | 24 | 35 | −11 | 8 | Relegation to 3. divisjon |
| 8 | Ålgård (R) | 14 | 1 | 4 | 9 | 16 | 34 | −18 | 6 | Relegation to 3. divisjon |

Source: rsssf.no
Rules for classification: 1) points; 2) goal difference; 3) number of goals scored.
(R) Relegated

==== Group B ====
| Pos | Team | Pld | W | D | L | GF | GA | GD | Pts | Qualification |
|---|---|---|---|---|---|---|---|---|---|---|
| 1 | Årstad (O, P) | 12 | 8 | 3 | 1 | 43 | 19 | +24 | 19 | Qualification for the promotion play-offs |
| 2 | Varegg | 12 | 8 | 2 | 2 | 30 | 23 | +7 | 18 | |
| 3 | Os | 12 | 5 | 4 | 3 | 23 | 22 | +1 | 14 | |
| 4 | Nordnes | 12 | 4 | 2 | 6 | 11 | 15 | −4 | 10 | |
| 5 | Baune | 12 | 1 | 6 | 5 | 15 | 24 | −9 | 8 | |
| 6 | Hardy | 12 | 3 | 2 | 7 | 13 | 26 | −13 | 8 | |
| 7 | Sandviken | 12 | 1 | 5 | 6 | 18 | 24 | −6 | 7 | |

Source: rsssf.no
Rules for classification: 1) points; 2) goal difference; 3) number of goals scored.
(O) Play-off winners; (P) Promoted

=== District Møre/Trøndelag ===
==== Møre ====
| Pos | Team | Pld | W | D | L | GF | GA | GD | Pts | Qualification or relegation |
|---|---|---|---|---|---|---|---|---|---|---|
| 1 | Kristiansund | 14 | 11 | 1 | 2 | 43 | 19 | +24 | 23 | Qualification for the promotion play-offs |
| 2 | Hødd | 14 | 10 | 1 | 3 | 44 | 21 | +23 | 21 | |
| 3 | Clausenengen | 14 | 8 | 1 | 5 | 38 | 27 | +11 | 17 | |
| 4 | Aalesund | 14 | 7 | 3 | 4 | 22 | 16 | +6 | 17 | |
| 5 | Langevåg | 14 | 7 | 0 | 7 | 32 | 24 | +8 | 14 | |
| 6 | Braatt (R) | 14 | 6 | 2 | 6 | 25 | 29 | −4 | 14 | Relegation to 3. divisjon |
| 7 | Spjelkavik (R) | 14 | 2 | 1 | 11 | 17 | 38 | −21 | 5 | Relegation to 3. divisjon |
| 8 | Rollon (R) | 14 | 0 | 1 | 13 | 9 | 56 | −47 | 1 | Relegation to 3. divisjon |

Source: rsssf.no
Rules for classification: 1) points; 2) goal difference; 3) number of goals scored.
(R) Relegated

==== Trøndelag ====
| Pos | Team | Pld | W | D | L | GF | GA | GD | Pts | Qualification or relegation |
|---|---|---|---|---|---|---|---|---|---|---|
| 1 | Freidig (O, P) | 14 | 10 | 3 | 1 | 41 | 11 | +30 | 23 | Qualification for the promotion play-offs |
| 2 | Kvik | 14 | 10 | 2 | 2 | 32 | 16 | +16 | 22 | |
| 3 | Nessegutten | 14 | 8 | 5 | 1 | 36 | 23 | +13 | 21 | |
| 4 | Brage | 14 | 5 | 4 | 5 | 20 | 23 | −3 | 14 | |
| 5 | Verdal | 14 | 6 | 1 | 7 | 26 | 35 | −9 | 13 | |
| 6 | Sverre | 14 | 3 | 1 | 10 | 28 | 35 | −7 | 7 | |
| 7 | Stjørdals/Blink (R) | 14 | 3 | 1 | 10 | 18 | 43 | −25 | 7 | Relegation to 3. divisjon |
| 8 | Rosenborg (R) | 14 | 2 | 1 | 11 | 20 | 35 | −15 | 5 | Relegation to 3. divisjon |

Source: rsssf.no
Rules for classification: 1) points; 2) goal difference; 3) number of goals scored.
(O) Play-off winners; (P) Promoted; (R) Relegated

== Promotion play-offs ==
Sørland/Vestland
Results A1–A2

- Jerv 3–2 Stavanger

Results A–B

- Jerv 0–2 Årstad

Årstad won 2–0 over Jerv and were promoted to Hovedserien.

Møre/Trøndelag

- Freidig 3–1 Kristiansund
- Kristiansund 2–3 Freidig

Freidig won 6–3 on aggregate and were promoted to Hovedserien.
