= 1959–60 Norwegian Main League =

16th season of top-tier football league in Norway

Hovedserien
- Season: 1959–60
- Champions: Fredrikstad; 8th title
- Relegated: Brann; Start; Raufoss; Brage
- European Cup: Fredrikstad

The 1959–60 Hovedserien was the 16th completed season of top division football in Norway.

== Overview ==
It was contested by 16 teams, and Fredrikstad won the championship, their eighth league title. This was the first season a bronze medal was awarded.

== Teams and locations ==
Note: Table lists in alphabetical order.

Group A
Team	Ap.	Location
Brann	12	Bergen
Greåker	2	Sarpsborg
Larvik Turn	11	Larvik
Lillestrøm	10	Lillestrøm
Sandefjord BK	14	Sandefjord
Start	4	Kristiansand
Vålerengen	11	Oslo
Viking	15	Stavanger

Group B
Team	Ap.	Location
Brage	4	Trondheim
Eik	3	Tønsberg
Fredrikstad	15	Fredrikstad
Odd	13	Skien
Rapid	4	Moss
Raufoss	6	Raufoss
Skeid	14	Oslo
Strømmen	10	Strømmen

== League tables ==
=== Group A ===
Pos	Team	Pld	W	D	L	GF	GA	GD	Pts	Qualification or relegation
1	Lillestrøm	14	8	3	3	28	21	+7	19	Qualification for the championship final
2	Vålerengen	14	8	2	4	27	21	+6	18	
3	Viking	14	6	4	4	25	18	+7	16	
4	Larvik Turn	14	7	1	6	32	22	+10	15	
5	Greåker	14	5	4	5	25	20	+5	14	
6	Sandefjord BK	14	5	4	5	16	18	−2	14	
7	Brann (R)	14	4	3	7	19	29	−10	11	Relegation to Landsdelsserien
8	Start (R)	14	1	3	10	15	38	−23	5	Relegation to Landsdelsserien

Source: RSSSF
(R) Relegated

=== Group B ===
Pos	Team	Pld	W	D	L	GF	GA	GD	Pts	Qualification or relegation
1	Fredrikstad (C)	14	10	3	1	41	16	+25	23	Qualification for the championship final
2	Eik	14	8	1	5	30	21	+9	17	
3	Skeid	14	7	3	4	30	23	+7	17	
4	Rapid	14	6	3	5	21	26	−5	15	
5	Odd	14	5	3	6	25	25	0	13	
6	Strømmen	14	5	3	6	23	27	−4	13	
7	Raufoss (R)	14	2	4	8	20	36	−16	8	Relegation to Landsdelsserien
8	Brage (R)	14	1	4	9	14	30	−16	6	Relegation to Landsdelsserien

Source: RSSSF
(C) Champions; (R) Relegated

== Results ==
=== Group A ===
Home \ Away	SKB	GRE	LAR	LIL	SBK	STA	VIF	VIK
Brann		0–3	4–1	1–2	0–1	2–1	0–1	1–1
Greåker	0–1		3–2	1–1	2–1	5–0	0–2	1–3
Larvik Turn	3–0	1–1		3–0	2–1	5–1	4–0	1–3
Lillestrøm	5–3	4–2	2–5		4–1	1–1	2–1	1–0
Sandefjord BK	2–2	0–0	2–0	0–2		4–1	1–1	1–0
Start	1–4	3–1	0–2	0–0	1–2		0–1	2–3
Vålerengen	7–0	1–5	2–1	3–0	3–0	3–3		2–1
Viking	1–1	1–1	3–2	0–4	0–0	5–1	4–0	

Source: NIFS.no
Legend: Blue = home team win; Yellow = draw; Red = away team win.

=== Group B ===
Home \ Away	BRA	EIK	FFK	ODD	RAP	RAU	SKD	STR
Brage		1–2	0–4	1–1	0–1	2–2	1–0	3–4
Eik	2–1		0–1	5–1	1–2	4–1	4–1	4–1
Fredrikstad	1–1	4–1		5–2	4–0	1–1	1–5	5–2
Odd	3–1	0–1	1–1		5–0	3–0	1–2	2–3
Rapid	3–0	2–2	1–4	1–1		3–1	1–2	2–3
Raufoss	4–1	2–1	2–3	1–2	1–1		4–4	0–1
Skeid	1–0	3–1	0–4	4–2	1–2	6–1		1–1
Strømmen	2–2	1–2	0–3	0–1	1–2	4–0	0–0	

Source: NIFS.no
Legend: Blue = home team win; Yellow = draw; Red = away team win.

== Championship final ==
- Fredrikstad 6–2 Lillestrøm

== Bronze final ==
- Eik 4–2 Vålerengen
