= Håkon Kindervåg =

Norwegian footballer (1922–1990)

Personal information
- Date of birth: 27 September 1922
- Date of death: 11 March 1990 (aged 67)
- Position: Forward

Senior career*
Years	Team	Apps	(Gls)
- Viking

International career
1953–1955	Norway B	2	(0)
1954	Norway	1	(0)
- * Club domestic league appearances and goals

Håkon Kindervåg (27 September 1922 – 11 March 1990) was a Norwegian footballer who played as a forward for Viking. He made one appearance for the Norway national team in 1954.

When he won the 1953 Norwegian Football Cup with Viking, he did so with his brother Bjarne. Through Bjarne, Håkon was a granduncle of Trond Kindervåg.
