= Kjell Schou-Andreassen =

Norwegian footballer and manager (1940–1997)

Personal information
- Full name: Kjell Schou-Andreassen
- Date of birth: 19 June 1940
- Place of birth: Stavanger, Norway
- Date of death: 19 November 1997 (aged 57)
- Position: Midfielder

Senior career*
Years	Team	Apps	(Gls)
1958–1959	Viking	3	(0)
1960–1961	Stavanger IF		
1962	SK Brann		
1963–1970	Viking	108	(0)

International career
1958	Norway U19	1	(0)

Managerial career
- 1971–1972: Viking
- 1975–1977: Norway
- 1977–1979: Bryne
- 1980–1981: Lillestrøm
- 1982: Viking
- 1987: Viking
- * Club domestic league appearances and goals

Kjell "Schou'en" Schou-Andreassen (19 June 1940 – 19 November 1997) was a Norwegian footballer and one of the country's most successful football managers. He is best known as manager of the Norway national football team 1974–1977, together with Nils Arne Eggen.

Although he played midfield for Viking FK (1958–59, 1964–70, 202 games), he also played for Stavanger IF (1960–61) and Sportsklubben Brann (1962–63) when they won Norwegian First Division 1963. He played one U19 game (1958).

He coached Viking FK as assistant of Sverre Andersen (1971), and as head coach (1972), which won the club the Norwegian First Division 1972.

He was national U21 team manager (1973–77) and main manager with Nils Arne Eggen (1974–78). In 1977, Norway came close to qualifying for a finals for the first time since the war. The pair also took charge for the Olympics in 1987. After his time as national manager, Schou-Andreassen was coach of Bryne FK (1977–79) and Lillestrøm Sportsklubb where he took over from Joe Hooley and finished 2nd in the Norwegian Football Cup 1980 and won the Norwegian Football Cup 1981. Later, he went "home" to Viking and won the Norwegian First Division 1982.

Eggen said that Schou Andreassen was the man who best represented Norwegian football for him. For 15 years, Schou-Andreassen managed at the top-level of Norwegian football. He had a great deal of influence over Norwegian coaching and sport. He later built his own personnel department. Schou-Andreasen died of leukemia, aged only 57.

== Bibliography ==
- Ledelse, teamarbeid og teamutvikling i fotball og arbeidsliv Together with Cato Wadel. 1989 ISBN 82-991781-2-6
