= 1953 Norwegian Football Cup =

Norgesmesterskapet i fotball for menn 1953

Tournament details
- Country: Norway
- Teams: 128 (main competition)

Final positions
- Champions: Viking (1st title)
- Runners-up: Lillestrøm

The 1953 Norwegian Football Cup was the 48th season of the Norwegian annual knockout football tournament. The tournament was open for all members of NFF, except those from Northern Norway. The final was played at Ullevaal Stadion in Oslo on 25 October 1953, and was contested by Lillestrøm, who made their first appearance in the cup final and Viking, who had lost the cup final on two previous occasions (1933 and 1947). Viking secured their first title with a 2–1 win in the final. Sparta was the defending champions, but was eliminated by Stavanger in the fourth round.

== First round ==
Team 1	Score	Team 2
AIK Lund	1–2	Donn
Asker	6–1	Sinsen
Askim	2–3	Spartacus
Aurskog	2–4	Lisleby
Baune	2–1	Os
Borg	0–1	Snøgg
Brage	2–0	Wing
Bryne	2–1	Mandalskameratene
Clausenengen	2–1	Kristiansund
Djerv	1–2	Fana
Drafn	4–0	Flint
Eik	1–2	Pors
Flekkefjord	4–1	Start
Fossekallen	0–3	Vålerengen
Fram (Larvik)	8–1	Ulefoss
Fredrikstad	4–0	Sem
Fremad Lillehammer	6–3	Trond
Gjøvik-Lyn	6–0	Fet
Greåker	3–2 (a.e.t.)	Sandefjord BK
Hamar	8–0	Stabæk
HamKam	3–3 (a.e.t.)	Tryggkam
Hardy	0–3	Brann
Heimdal	0–1	Ranheim
Hødd	2–2 (a.e.t.)	Rollon
Jerv	1–0	Grane (Arendal)
Jevnaker	3–1	Vardal
Kongsberg	0–4	Frigg
Lyn	11–1	Rjukan
Molde	4–0	Træff
National	3–3 (a.e.t.)	Kvik (Trondheim)
Neset	0–2	Falken
Nordnes	6–2	Jotun
Nymark	0–1	Årstad
Nærbø	2–1	Jarl
Odd	8–0	Brevik
Oslo-Odd	1–6	Sarpsborg
Rapid	1–0	Drammens BK
Raufoss	6–2	Skreia
Runar	0–2	Storm
Sagene	4–2	Nydalen
Sandaker	5–0	Gresvik
Selbak	3–2	Tønsberg Turn
Solberg	5–1	Blaker
Sparta	3–0	Stag
Spjelkavik	0–5	Langevåg
Sprint-Jeløy	0–2	Skeid
Stavanger	4–3	Djerv 1919
Steinkjer	3–2	Stjørdal
Strømmen	4–0	Funnefoss
Strømsgodset	2–6	Geithus
Sverre	2–1 (a.e.t.)	Nessegutten
Sørfjell	0–2	Trauma
Urædd	2–3	Larvik Turn
Vang	0–4	Kapp
Vard	4–0	Haugar
Verdal	2–4	Freidig
Vestfossen	5–1	Herkules
Viking	2–1	Ulf
Voss	0–3	Varegg
Ørn	4–1 (a.e.t.)	Kvik (Halden)
Østsiden	1–5	Lillestrøm
Aalesund	2–4	Ørsta
Ålgård	4–1	Klepp
Aasen	1–4	Moss
Replay
Kvik (Trondheim)	5–2	National
Rollon	4–1	Hødd
Tryggkam	1–9	HamKam

== Second round ==
Team 1	Score	Team 2
Asker	4–1	Fremad Lillehammer
Clausenengen	1–2	Falken
Donn	2–1	Ålgård
Drafn	3–1 (a.e.t.)	Selbak
Fana	1–7	Varegg
Flekkefjord	3–1	Bryne
Frigg	0–2	Sparta
Geithus	3–4 (a.e.t.)	Raufoss
Jevnaker	0–1	Strømmen
Kapp	3–1	Rapid
Larvik Turn	8–1	Sandaker
Lillestrøm	5–2	Greåker
Lisleby	4–1	Lyn
Moss	0–1 (a.e.t.)	Gjøvik-Lyn
Nærbø	0–5	Viking
Pors	7–2	Jerv
Ranheim	2–1 (a.e.t.)	Kvik (Trondheim)
Rollon	1–6	Langevåg
Sarpsborg	5–1	Vestfossen
Skeid	3–1	Ørn
Snøgg	0–9	Fredrikstad
Solberg	6–4 (a.e.t.)	HamKam
Spartacus	2–3	Odd
Stavanger	4–1	Baune
Steinkjer	2–5 (a.e.t.)	Brage
Storm	1–1 (a.e.t.)	Sagene
Sverre	3–0	Freidig
Trauma	0–3	Fram (Larvik)
Vard	2–4	Brann
Vålerengen	2–5	Hamar
Ørsta	0–2	Molde
Årstad	1–6	Nordnes
Replay
Sagene	4–1	Storm

== Third round ==
Team 1	Score	Team 2
9 August 1953
Sparta	5–0	Drafn
Fredrikstad	2–3	Pors
Sagene	4–1	Nordnes
Strømmen	1–2	Kapp
Hamar	3–2	Larvik Turn
Gjøvik-Lyn	2–0	Sarpsborg
Raufoss	0–3	Asker
Fram (Larvik)	2–0	Solberg
Odd	4–2	Donn
Viking	7–0	Flekkefjord
Varegg	0–2	Stavanger
Brann	2–1	Lisleby
Langevåg	1–6	Skeid
Molde	0–1	Ranheim
Brage	1–2	Lillestrøm
Falken	2–1	Sverre

== Fourth round ==
Team 1	Score	Team 2
23 August 1953
Skeid	2–3	Fram (Larvik)
Asker	2–0	Falken
Lillestrøm	4–1	Gjøvik-Lyn
Kapp	1–1 (a.e.t.)	Odd
Pors	1–3	Viking
Stavanger	1–0	Sparta
Brann	2–2 (a.e.t.)	Sagene
Ranheim	1–0	Hamar
Replay: 30 August 1953
Odd	5–3	Kapp
Replay: 6 September 1953
Sagene	2–1	Brann

== Quarter-finals ==
Team 1	Score	Team 2
20 September 1953
Lillestrøm	2–1	Fram (Larvik)
Odd	0–2	Asker
Ranheim	3–1	Stavanger
Viking	6–0	Sagene

== Semi-finals ==
Team 1	Score	Team 2
11 October 1953
Ranheim	0–3	Lillestrøm
Asker	1–1 (a.e.t.)	Viking
Replay: 18 October 1953
Viking	1–0	Asker

== Final ==
25 October 1953
13:00 CET (UTC+1)

Viking	2–1	Lillestrøm
H. Kindervåg 24'; Ingvaldsen 70'	Report	Borgersen 80'

Ullevaal Stadion, Oslo
Attendance: 31,102
Referee: Øivind Helgesen (Liull)

Viking:
Peder Svendsen
Bjarne Kindervåg
Lauritz Abrahamsen
Kåre Bjørnsen
Edgar Falch
Victor Bergsten
Kåre Ingvaldsen
Rolf Bjørnsen
Karl Bø
Hilmar Paulsen	(substituted off) 43'
Håkon Kindervåg
Substitutes:
'	Jan Ørke	(substituted on) 43'

Lillestrøm:
Hans Kristiansen
Kjell Lund
Hans Hansen
Rolf Wahl
Ivar Kristiansen
Svein Bergersen
Ivar Hansen
Ivar Wahl
Sverre Borgersen
Gunnar Arnesen
Gunnar Lund

== See also ==
- 1952–53 Norwegian Main League
- 1953 in Norwegian football
