= Arvid Knutsen =

Norwegian footballer (1944–2009)

Personal information
- Full name: Arvid Ingar Knutsen
- Date of birth: 3 March 1944
- Place of birth: Stavanger, Norway
- Date of death: 4 January 2009 (aged 64)
- Position: Forward

Senior career*
Years	Team	Apps	(Gls)
- Stavanger
1961–1975	Viking	396	(117)

Managerial career
- 1976: Viking
- Frigg
- Klepp
- Ulf Sandnes
- * Club domestic league appearances and goals

Arvid Ingar Knutsen (3 March 1944 – 4 January 2009) was a Norwegian football player and coach.

A forward, he joined Viking FK from Stavanger IF in 1961, and made his senior team debut in 1963. With Viking he won the Norwegian First Division in 1972, 1973, 1974 and 1975, and also took bronze medals in 1968 and 1971. He played for Viking 396 times, scoring 117 goals. From 1976 he coached the team.

Outside of his sporting career, Knutsen worked as a high school teacher at Stavanger Cathedral School. He took his education at the University of Bergen in 1969 and at the Norwegian School of Sport Sciences in 1981. He married in 1974, and had two daughters.

In March 2008 he was diagnosed with brain tumor. Operated at Haukeland, he learned that he suffered from terminal cancer, and he died in January 2009.
