= William Danielsen =

Norwegian footballer and coach (1915–1989)

William Danielsen (9 December 1915 – 21 August 1989) was a Norwegian footballer. He played for Viking. He scored 180 goals in 370 games for Viking from 1931-1952.

He was just 15 when he made his debut for Viking in 1931. He played for Viking in their first Norwegian Cup final in 1933. He also played in the 1947 Norwegian Cup final, Viking's second final. In both games, they were beaten.

He made his debut for Norway in 1933. He played a total of 6 games and scored 1 goal up to 1937. He also played 17 games for Rogaland Regional Association. This is a joint record, with Reidar Kvammen.

He was the coach of Viking in 1955 and 1958–1959. As a player, Danielsen was beaten in two finals. As a coach, he finally won the cup for Viking in 1959 after beating Sandefjord 2–1 in the final. He was also the chairman of Viking from 1958 to 1962.
