= Bjarne Berntsen =

Norwegian football manager (born 1956)

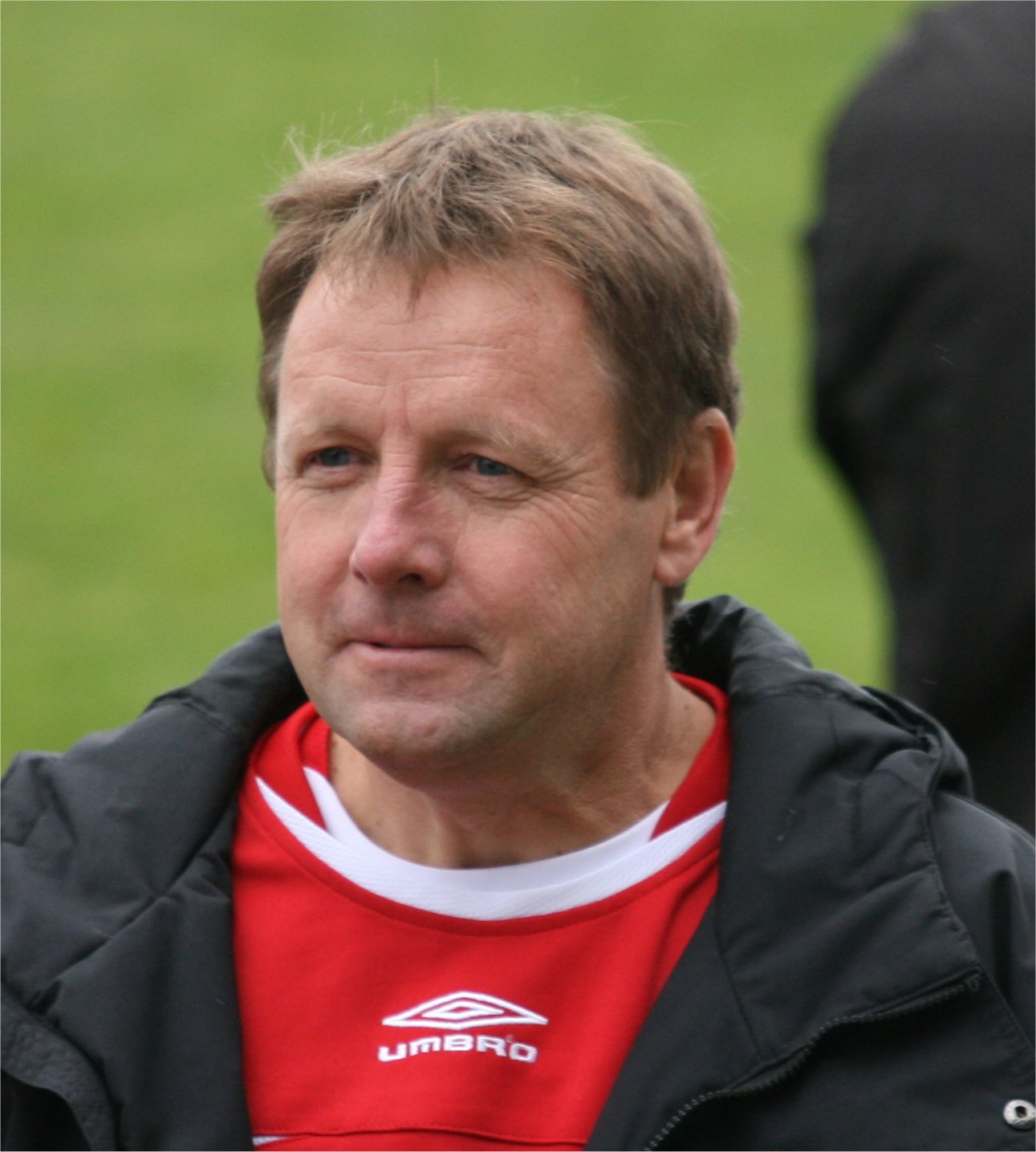

Personal information
- Date of birth: 21 December 1956 (age 69)
- Place of birth: Sandnes, Norway
- Position: Defender

Team information
- Current team: Sandnes Ulf (manager)

Youth career
- Figgjo IL

Senior career*
Years	Team	Apps	(Gls)
1977–1982	Viking	120	(13)

International career
1977	Norway U21	2	(0)
1978–1982	Norway	33	(0)

Managerial career
- 1986–1988: Bryne
- 1986–1987: Norway (assistant)
- 1992–1995: Viking
- 1999–2004: Viking (managing director)
- 2004: Viking (caretaker)
- 2005–2009: Norway (women)
- 2010–2012: Viking (managing director)
- 2017–2020: Viking
- 2021: Bryne (managing director)
- 2021–2023: Sandnes Ulf
- * Club domestic league appearances and goals

Bjarne Berntsen (born 21 December 1956) is a Norwegian football coach and former player who is the manager of Sandnes Ulf. He is the elder brother of fellow football coach Alf Ingve Berntsen.

== Playing career ==
Bjarne Berntsen began his football career at local club Figgjo IL. He signed for Norwegian top division club Viking in 1977, and stayed there until 1982. During this period he played 33 matches for the Norway national team, including the famous September 1981 win over England where he played at the right back position.

Despite being only 25 years old, Berntsen chose to step away from top-level football at the end of the 1982 season, and returned to his former club Figgjo which at the time played in the fourth tier of the league pyramid.

== Early manager years ==
After retiring as a player, Berntsen coached Figgjo, Bryne and Viking. Between 1986 and 1987, Berntsen was also the assistant coach of the Norwegian national team. He won the Norwegian cup with Bryne in 1987, still only 30 years old.

== Viking club director ==
Between 1999 and 2004, Berntsen was the Director of Viking. After Viking manager Kjell Inge Olsen resigned on 13 April 2004, he took over as caretaker manager until 12 July 2004, when the club signed Roy Hodgson as their new manager. Berntsen then resumed his role as club Director. In late 2004 he was surprisingly offered the job as head coach of the Norway women's national football team from 1 January 2005 on, which he accepted.

== Women's national team coaching career ==
Berntsen's first tournament with the national women's team was the 2005 UEFA Women's Championship which took place in June 2005 in England. He courted controversy by including 16 year old Isabell Herlovsen, the daughter of one of his former teammates on the Norway national team, in the squad. However, she scored two vital goals to keep Norway in the tournament. After mixed fortunes in the group stage, Norway played a memorable semifinal against Sweden which they won by 3–2 after extra time with a goal from Solveig Gulbrandsen. In the final against Germany, Norway lost 3–1.

Berntsen led the national women's team through qualification to the FIFA Women's World Cup 2007 tournament in China, where they won their group by beating Canada and Ghana and drawing against Australia. In the quarter final against the hosts China, in front of 50,000 spectators, Norway won 1–0, the only goal being scored by Herlovsen. In the semifinal, the team lost to Germany by 3–0, and they then lost the third-place playoff 4–1 against the US to finish in fourth place. By virtue of their performance at the World Cup, Norway qualified for the 2008 Olympics.

After the UEFA Women's Euro 2009, Berntsen resigned as coach of the women's national team.

== Later years ==
On 11 February 2010, Viking announced that Berntsen was again hired as the Director of the club, nearly five and a half years after he resigned from the same position. Two years later, Berntsen was nominated and elected vice president of the Football Association of Norway which meant that he had to quit his position at Viking.

After Viking's relegation from the Eliteserien and manager Ian Burchnall's dismissal from the club in December 2017, Berntsen made a surprising return to Viking, leaving his role as vice president of the Norwegian FA to take on the manager role at the club. He led Viking to a first place in the 2018 1. divisjon and were promoted back to Eliteserien after one season's absence. On 20 June 2019, Viking announced that Berntsen's contract had been extended with two more years, till the end of the 2021 season.

In the Norwegian local elections, 2019 he was elected to a seat in Sandnes municipal council, representing the Labour Party.

On 26 November 2020, it was announced that Berntsen would be relieved of his duties as manager of Viking FK after the 2020 season. This was controversial as Berntsen himself was not contacted before the decision was made, and was well loved by the majority of fans. The leadership of Viking received a lot of criticism for their actions, and publicly apologised afterwards. In June 2021 he was hired as managing director of Bryne FK. He resigned in August 2021, amid rumours that he would take over the vacant manager job at Sandnes Ulf.

== Managerial statistics ==
As of 19 December 2020

Team	From	To	Record				
Team	From	To	G	W	D	L	Win %
Viking	15 June 1992	31 December 1995	106	53	20	33	50.00
Viking (interim)	14 April 2004	11 July 2004	16	5	7	4	31.25
Norway (women)	1 January 2005	7 September 2009	76	36	11	29	47.37
Viking	19 December 2017	31 December 2020	100	53	17	30	53.00
Sandnes Ulf	12 August 2021	Present	0	0	0	0	—
Total			298	147	55	96	49.33
