= Georg Monsen =

Norwegian footballer and manager (1922-2015)

Personal information
- Date of birth: 19 December 1922
- Place of birth: Stavanger, Norway
- Date of death: 10 April 2015 (aged 92)
- Place of death: Stavanger, Norway
- Position: Midfielder

Senior career*
| Years | Team | Apps | (Gls) |
| 1945–1950 | Viking | | |
| 1950–195X | Nancy | 7 | (1) |
| 195X–1951 | Besançon | 14 | (0) |
| 1953 | Viking | | |
| 1958 | Viking | 2 | (0) |

Managerial career
- 1953–1954: Viking
- 1955: Bryne
- 1956–1957: Viking
- 1962–1963: Viking
- 1965: Viking
- Stålkameratene
- * Club domestic league appearances and goals

Georg Monsen (19 December 1922 – 10 April 2015) was a Norwegian former football midfielder and manager.

== Playing career ==
Monsen played 147 games and scored 66 games for Viking FK. He also played for FC Nancy and Besançon in French Ligue 1 and Ligue 2.

== Managerial career ==
He was the coach of Viking. He won the Norwegian Football Cup in 1953. He later had a stint in Stålkameratene.
