= Olav Nilsen =

Norwegian footballer and manager (1942–2021)

Personal information
- Full name: Nils Olav Nilsen
- Date of birth: 24 January 1942
- Place of birth: Stavanger, Norway
- Date of death: 11 October 2021 (aged 79)
- Positions: Midfielder; striker

Senior career*
Years	Team	Apps	(Gls)
1959–1975	Viking	232	(63)

International career
1962–1971	Norway	62	(19)

Managerial career
- 1975: Viking
- * Club domestic league appearances and goals

Nils Olav Nilsen (24 January 1942 – 11 October 2021) was a Norwegian footballer who played as a striker in his early career, but was later used as a midfielder. He scored 19 goals in 62 matches for the Norway national team.

On club level Nilsen played for Viking, being team captain during their heyday in the early 1970s. With Nilsen a commanding figure, they won three league championships in 1972, 1973 and 1974. The supporters nicknamed him "Olav Viking".
