= Sigbjørn Slinning =

Norwegian footballer (born 1945)

Personal information
- Full name: Sigbjørn Slinning
- Date of birth: 6 October 1945 (age 81)
- Place of birth: Stavanger, Norway
- Position: Left back

Youth career
- Viking

Senior career*
Years	Team	Apps	(Gls)
1962–1978	Viking	523	

International career
1963	Norway U19	2	(1)
1965–1968	Norway U21	3	(1)
1969–1976	Norway	42	(1)
- * Club domestic league appearances and goals

Sigbjørn Slinning (born 6 Oktober 1945) is a Norwegian former international football player.

== Biography ==
Born in Stavanger, Slinning played for the club Viking FK from his youth and during his whole career. He made his debut on the first team in 1962, 17 years old, and played a total of 523 games for the first team between 1962 and 1976. With Viking, he won the Norwegian football league four times, in 1972, 1973, 1974 and 1975.

He was capped on youth and U21 level, and played 42 matches for the Norwegian national team between 1969 and 1976.
