= Svein Fjælberg =

Norwegian footballer (born 1959)

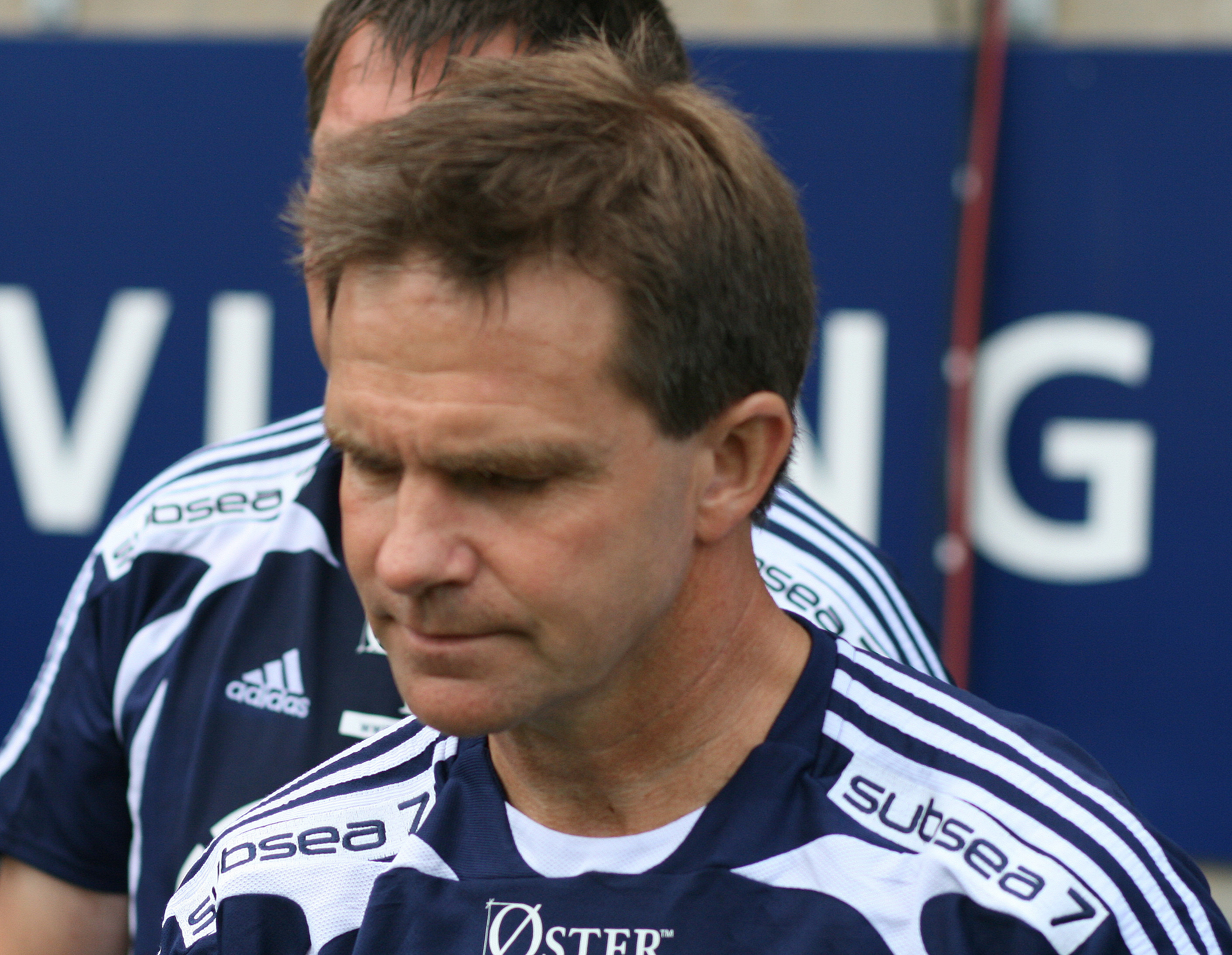
- Fjælberg in 2008, during a show match between Viking All Star and Liverpool Legends

Personal information
- Full name: Svein Fjælberg
- Date of birth: 12 January 1959 (age 67)
- Place of birth: Sola Municipality, Norway
- Position: Defender

Youth career
- Sola

Senior career*
| Years | Team | Apps | (Gls) |
| 1979–1990 | Viking | 128 | (2) |

International career
| 1979–1986 | Norway | 33 | (0) |

Managerial career
- 1990–1991: Viking (ass. coach)
- 2000–2001: Viking (ass. coach)
- 2010–2011: Viking (ass. coach)
- * Club domestic league appearances and goals

Svein Fjælberg (born 12 January 1959) is a Norwegian former football defender. He played 11 seasons for the Norwegian club Viking, where he won the league twice as well as two cup titles. Fjælberg was capped 33 times for Norway. After his retirement he served as the assistant coach of Viking on three occasions.

== Playing career ==
=== Club career ===
Fjælberg was born in Sola Municipality, and started playing football for Sola FK. As a 17-year-old, Anbjørn Ekeland and Viking wanted his services, but he stayed at Sola a couple more years until he moved to Viking in 1979. Viking paid Sola 45,000 kr for the transfer, which was Viking's most expensive transfer at the time. Fjælberg played in every match during his first season at Viking when they won the double, and his good performances at the club made him a candidate for the national team.

Viking and Fjælberg again won the Norwegian league in 1982, and in 1983 Fjælberg was awarded "Norwegian Player of the Year". Fjælberg also won the award "Viking Player of the Year" in 1983 and 1985. Fjælberg was the captain of Viking later in his career, and played for the club in the second tier after they got relegated in 1986. He was still with the club when they were promoted to the First Division again in 1988, and he lifted the trophy when the club won the Norwegian Cup in 1989 by beating Molde in the final. Fjælberg retired after the 1989 season, and in total he played 128 league matches for the club, scoring two goals.

=== International career ===
On 26 September 1979 he made his debut for Norway in an Olympic qualifying match against West Germany, and three years later he played his first non-Olympic national match in the friendly match against Sweden on 11 August 1982. Fjælberg also competed for Norway in the football tournament of the Los Angeles Olympics in 1984. In total he was capped 33 times for Norway, and his last international match was the UEFA Euro 1988 qualifying match against East Germany on 24 September 1989.

== Coaching career ==
After he retired Fjælberg started to work as assistant coach under head coach Benny Lennartsson, a position he had from 1990 to 1991. This makes him the last assistant coach to win the league with Viking as they won in 1991. When Lennartsson returned to Viking as head coach in 2000, he again wanted Fjælberg as assistant coach. On 9 August 2007, Fjælberg was unveiled as Viking's new "youth development coach" while Kjell Inge Olsen was presented as the new head scout. In 2009, he was again hired as assistant coach, this time under head coach Åge Hareide. Following the changes in Viking's coaching staff ahead of the 2012 season, Fjælberg was given a new position as "administrative leader" of the first team.

== Career statistics ==
| Season | Club | Division | League | | Cup | | Europe | | Total | |
| Season | Club | Division | Apps | Goals | Apps | Goals | Apps | Goals | Apps | Goals |
|---|---|---|---|---|---|---|---|---|---|---|
| 1979 | Viking | 1. divisjon | 22 | 1 | 7 | 1 | 2 | 0 | 31 | 2 |
| 1980 | Viking | 1. divisjon | 10 | 0 | 0 | 0 | 0 | 0 | 10 | 0 |
| 1981 | Viking | 1. divisjon | 13 | 0 | 5 | 0 | 0 | 0 | 18 | 0 |
| 1982 | Viking | 1. divisjon | 11 | 0 | 3 | 0 | 1 | 0 | 15 | 0 |
| 1983 | Viking | 1. divisjon | 18 | 0 | 2 | 0 | 2 | 0 | 22 | 0 |
| 1984 | Viking | 1. divisjon | 13 | 0 | 4 | 1 | 0 | 0 | 17 | 1 |
| 1985 | Viking | 1. divisjon | 17 | 0 | 4 | 0 | 0 | 0 | 21 | 0 |
| 1986 | Viking | 1. divisjon | 10 | 1 | 4 | 0 | 0 | 0 | 14 | 1 |
| 1987 | Viking | 2. divisjon | 1 | 0 | 0 | 0 | 0 | 0 | 1 | 0 |
| 1988 | Viking | 2. divisjon | 2 | 0 | 0 | 0 | 0 | 0 | 2 | 0 |
| 1989 | Viking | 1. divisjon | 11 | 0 | 6 | 0 | 0 | 0 | 17 | 0 |
| Career Total | | | 128 | 2 | 35 | 2 | 5 | 0 | 168 | 4 |
