= Kåre Bjørnsen =

Norwegian footballer (1934-1993)

Personal information
- Date of birth: 17 July 1934
- Date of death: 6 March 1993 (aged 58)
- Position: Defender

International career
Years	Team	Apps	(Gls)
1960	Norway	1	(0)

Kåre Bjørnsen (17 July 1934 – 6 March 1993) was a Norwegian footballer. He played in one match for the Norway national football team in 1960. He also played for the Stavanger-based Viking Fotballklubb.
