= Erik Fuglestad =

Norwegian footballer and coach (born 1974)

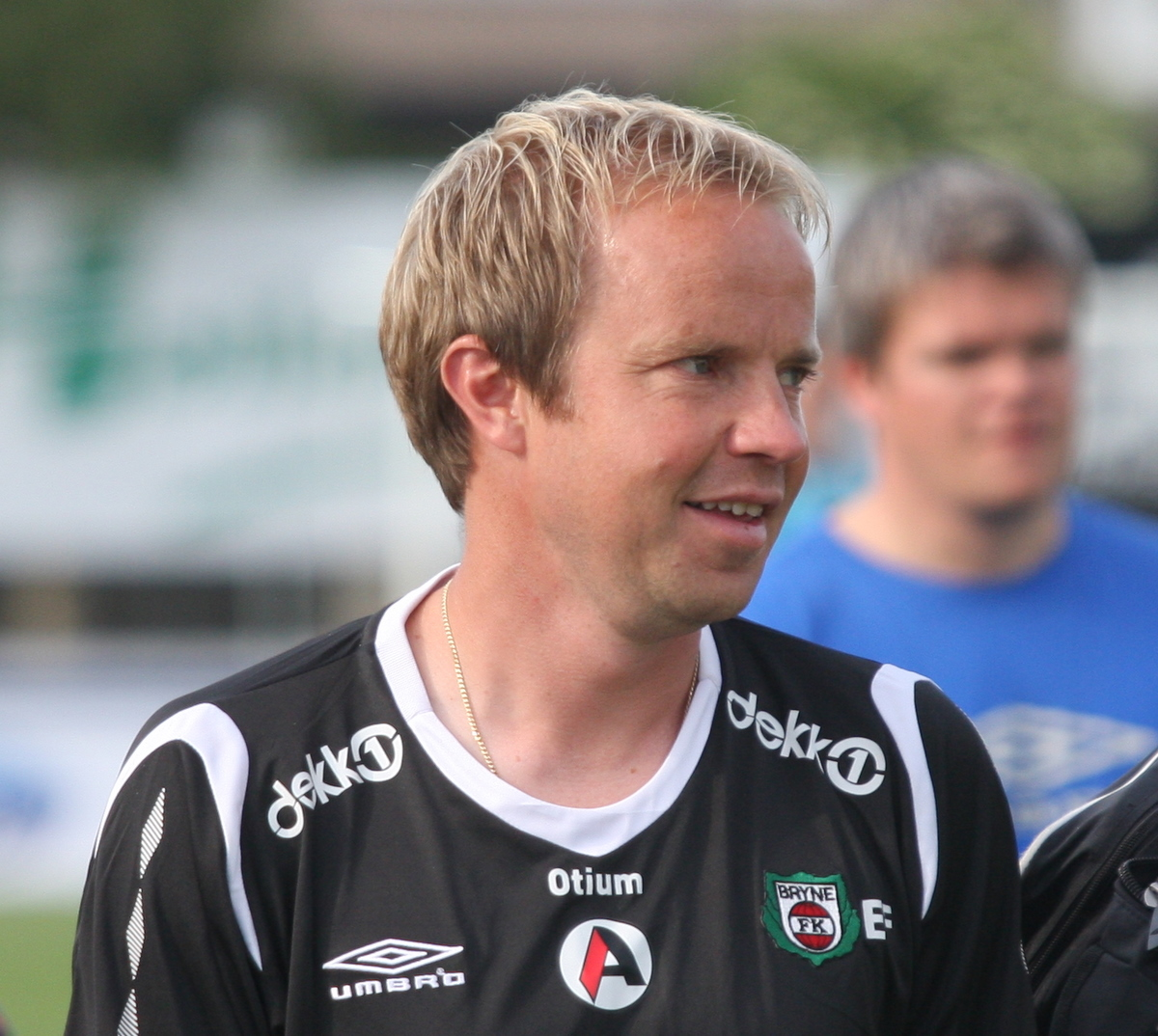
- Fuglestad at Bryne Stadion June 2009

Personal information
- Date of birth: 13 August 1974 (age 52)
- Position: Defender

Youth career
- Randaberg

Senior career*
Years	Team	Apps	(Gls)
1994–1997	Viking	75	(4)
1997–2000	Norwich City	74	(2)
2000–2004	Viking	81	(15)
Total		230	(21)

International career
1995	Norway U21	1	(0)

Managerial career
- 2012–: Randaberg
- * Club domestic league appearances and goals

Erik Fuglestad (born 13 August 1974) is a Norwegian former professional footballer and later coach. During his professional career, Fuglestad played for Viking and Norwich City and made one single appearance for Norway at the under-21 level.

== Playing career ==
Fuglestad, nicknamed "Fuglis", was born in Stavanger and began his senior career with Viking FK, having arrived from Randaberg IL as a junior. He made his debut in a friendly in 1993, and his league debut in the final game of the 1994 season, replacing Øyvind Mellemstrand at left back. Fuglestad's break-through followed in the 1995 season, when he featured in 25 of the club's 26 league games, scoring two goals, both against IK Start in the space of two weeks during July. Being a local lad, Fuglestad excited the Viking following with his attacking style and good crossing.

He remained the first-choice left back at Viking for a further two seasons, before Mike Walker brought him to Norwich City on a Bosman free transfer in November 1997. He made 80 appearances, scoring 2 goals against Sheffield United and Huddersfield, for the Canaries before his contract was cancelled towards the end of the 1999–00 season and he returned to former club Viking.

Upon returning to Norwegian football, Fuglestad retrained as a midfielder, playing both in the centre and on the left wing, and he remained a midfielder for the rest of his career. In the 2001 season, he started all 26 league games for Viking, scoring nine goals. In addition, he scored three goals in six cup games, when his club won the 2001 Norwegian Football Cup, Viking's first cup-win in twelve years. However, he missed the cup final due to an injury. The 2001 Norwegian Cup trophy was his only trophy as a senior footballer.

Fuglestad remained a first-choice midfielder throughout the 2002 season, but he missed all of 2003 through injury. His comeback in 2004 lasted only 15 league games, before a kidney illness forced him into retirement. He remained as an employee of Viking, where he had a role in the administration and was later the head coach of the junior team. An attempted comeback with home club Randaberg IL in 2007 was cut short as Fuglestad's illness returned, and he announced his definitive retirement on 7 August 2007.

== Coaching career ==
Ahead of the 2008 season he went from being coach of Viking FK's junior team to player developer in Bryne FK. In 2012, he became the head coach of Randaberg IL.
