= Kjell Inge Olsen =

Norwegian football manager

Kjell Inge Olsen (born 26 September 1961 in Stavanger) is a former head scout and manager at Viking FK. In 2003, Kjell Inge Olsen took over as manager of Viking, and that season finished fifth in the league. During Olsen's time in charge, the team also played their last game at Stavanger stadion against Stabæk in their last home page that autumn.

At the beginning of the 2004 season, Viking moved to a new stadium in Jåttåvågen, Viking Stadion. Viking faltered in Olsen's first season as a manager, and opened the season with a 0–4 defeat to Tromsø which spelt the end of his management career. He resigned "for personal reasons" but failed to find another management job. On 9 August 2007, he was presented as the new head scout, while Svein Fjælberg also remained on the scouting staff.
