= Svein Kvia =

Norwegian footballer and manager (1947-2005)

Personal information
- Full name: Svein Kvia
- Date of birth: 27 September 1947
- Place of birth: Stavanger, Norway
- Date of death: 2 February 2005 (aged 57)
- Position: Midfielder

Youth career
- Viking

Senior career*
Years	Team	Apps	(Gls)
1965–1980	Viking	293	(27)

International career
1969–1976	Norway	38	(3)

Managerial career
- 1977: Viking
- 1984: Viking
- 1986–1987: Viking
- * Club domestic league appearances and goals

Svein "Kvien" Kvia (27 September 1947 – 2 February 2005) was a Norwegian footballer who spent his entire career at Viking F.K., where he was one of the club's most successful players of all time.

Between 1965 and 1980, Kvia played 551 times for the Viking first team, of which 293 matches (27 goals) were in league competition. This was an all-time club record at the time, which was broken by André Danielsen in 2018. Kvia also played 38 caps for the Norwegian national team between 1969 and 1976, scoring 3 goals.

Kvia helped Viking win the national junior championships in 1965, and he was a central figure in the team that won four straight league titles between 1972 and 1975. He was also captain of the side that clinched The Double of league and cup in 1979. In addition, Kvia won league bronze medals in 1968, 1971 and 1978. Kvia was also manager of the Viking first team on three occasions, in 1977, 1984 and 1986–87. In the 1990s, he served as the club's director for several years.

Kvia was voted Norwegian footballer of the year in 1976, and he was voted midfielder of the year five times in the period 1971–76. In 1989 Kvia was proclaimed honorary member of Viking. He died at the age of 57 from brain cancer.
