= 1958–59 Norwegian Main League =

15th season of top-tier football league in Norway

Hovedserien
- Season: 1958–59
- Champions: Lillestrøm; 1st title
- Relegated: Asker; Årstad; Freidig; Kapp

The 1958–59 Hovedserien was the 15th completed season of top division football in Norway.

== Overview ==
It was contested by 16 teams, and Lillestrøm won the championship, their first league title.

== Teams and locations ==
Note: Table lists in alphabetical order.

Group A
Team	Ap.	Location
Årstad	7	Bergen
Asker	8	Asker
Brann	11	Bergen
Eik	2	Tønsberg
Fredrikstad	14	Fredrikstad
Greåker	1	Sarpsborg
Sandefjord BK	13	Sandefjord
Viking	14	Stavanger

Group B
Team	Ap.	Location
Freidig	5	Trondheim
Kapp	4	Kapp
Larvik Turn	10	Larvik
Lillestrøm	9	Lillestrøm
Odd	12	Skien
Raufoss	5	Raufoss
Skeid	13	Oslo
Strømmen	9	Strømmen

== League tables ==
=== Group A ===
Pos	Team	Pld	W	D	L	GF	GA	GD	Pts	Qualification or relegation
1	Fredrikstad	14	8	6	0	34	14	+20	22	Qualification for the championship final
2	Eik	14	7	4	3	26	15	+11	18	
3	Viking	14	7	3	4	25	17	+8	17	
4	Sandefjord	14	4	4	6	19	21	−2	12	
5	Brann	14	5	2	7	21	27	−6	12	
6	Greåker	14	4	4	6	19	25	−6	12	
7	Asker (R)	14	3	5	6	18	19	−1	11	Relegation to Landsdelsserien
8	Årstad (R)	14	3	2	9	12	36	−24	8	Relegation to Landsdelsserien

Source: RSSSF
(R) Relegated

=== Group B ===
Pos	Team	Pld	W	D	L	GF	GA	GD	Pts	Qualification or relegation
1	Lillestrøm (C)	14	9	1	4	36	25	+11	19	Qualification for the championship final
2	Larvik Turn	14	5	6	3	38	25	+13	16	
3	Strømmen	14	5	6	3	27	20	+7	16	
4	Skeid	14	6	3	5	28	18	+10	15	
5	Raufoss	14	5	5	4	24	19	+5	15	
6	Odd	14	5	3	6	23	29	−6	13	
7	Freidig (R)	14	5	2	7	34	38	−4	12	Relegation to Landsdelsserien
8	Kapp (R)	14	2	2	10	19	55	−36	6	Relegation to Landsdelsserien

Source: RSSSF
(C) Champions; (R) Relegated

== Results ==
=== Group A ===
Home \ Away	ÅRS	ASK	SKB	EIK	FFK	GRE	SBK	VIK
Årstad		0–5	2–3	2–1	0–3	0–3	2–2	2–1
Asker	1–1		0–0	0–0	1–3	1–3	1–1	0–1
Brann	3–0	4–2		1–2	1–2	2–1	1–1	1–2
Eik	4–0	0–3	6–0		2–2	2–0	2–0	1–1
Fredrikstad	3–1	1–1	4–0	4–0		3–3	1–1	3–3
Greåker	0–2	1–0	0–4	1–1	1–1		3–2	2–4
Sandefjord BK	2–0	3–1	4–1	0–2	0–3	2–0		0–1
Viking	5–0	1–2	1–0	1–3	0–1	1–1	3–1	

Source: NIFS.no
Legend: Blue = home team win; Yellow = draw; Red = away team win.

=== Group B ===
Home \ Away	FRE	KAP	LAR	LIL	ODD	RAU	SKD	STR
Freidig		8–3	3–3	1–3	4–2	2–0	1–4	3–1
Kapp	1–5		0–7	5–2	0–2	1–0	1–2	1–1
Larvik Turn	0–0	10–2		2–4	5–1	1–1	1–4	3–1
Lillestrøm	3–2	3–1	0–1		6–1	7–1	1–0	2–0
Odd	4–2	6–1	0–0	1–2		2–1	0–5	0–0
Raufoss	4–0	1–0	5–1	5–2	1–1		3–0	1–1
Skeid	4–0	6–1	2–2	0–0	0–3	0–0		0–3
Strømmen	6–3	2–2	2–2	5–1	2–0	1–1	2–1	

Source: NIFS.no
Legend: Blue = home team win; Yellow = draw; Red = away team win.

== Championship final ==
- Lillestrøm - Fredrikstad: 2-2 (AET), 4-1 (Replay)
