= Sverre Andersen =

Norwegian footballer (1936-2016)

Personal information
- Date of birth: 9 October 1936
- Place of birth: Stavanger, Norway
- Date of death: 1 November 2016 (aged 80)
- Place of death: Stavanger, Norway
- Position: Goalkeeper

Senior career*
Years	Team	Apps	(Gls)
1952–1971	Viking	262	(0)

International career
1956–1968	Norway	41	(0)

Managerial career
- 1960: Viking
- 1966–1970: Viking
- 1973: Viking
- 1985: Viking
- * Club domestic league appearances and goals

Sverre Andersen (9 October 1936 – 1 November 2016) was a Norwegian footballer. He made his debut for Viking FK in 1952 as a goalkeeper, and played his last game in 1971. He played a total of 482 games for Viking (262 in Norwegian league). For many years, he was considered the best goalkeeper in Norway. He won goalkeeper of the year in 1962, 1963, 1965 and 1968 in the VG Awards.

== National team ==
Sverre Andersen made his Norway debut on 30 June 1954 when he played for the U19 in a game against Denmark in Odense. On 19 September he made his debut for U21 in a game against Sweden. He played a total of 3 games for the U21s. On 26 August 1956, he made his debut for the main team against Finland which ended 1-1. He played a total of 41 games for Norway. His last game was against Poland on 9 June 1968 which Norway lost 1–6.

== Coach career ==
Andersen was also coach of Viking for many seasons, even while he was still a player. He was first trainer of Viking's team in 1960, later from 1966–1970, in 1973 and in autumn 1985. In 1973, he led Viking to the title. He was also goalkeeper coach for Viking for one season, and for many seasons was the coach of Viking's junior team.
