= 1974 Norwegian First Division =

30th season of top-tier football league in Norway

1. divisjon
- Season: 1974
- Dates: 28 April – 13 October
- Champions: Viking; 4th title
- Relegated: HamKam; Sarpsborg; Raufoss
- European Cup: Viking
- Cup Winners' Cup: Skeid
- UEFA Cup: Molde; Vålerengen
- Matches played: 132
- Goals scored: 371 (2.81 per match)
- Top goalscorer: Odd Berg (13 goals)
- Biggest home win: Viking 6–0 Raufoss (5 August 1974); Raufoss 7–1 HamKam (29 September 1974)
- Biggest away win: Vålerengen 0–5 Rosenborg (2 September 1974)
- Highest scoring: Rosenborg 6–2 Strømsgodset (26 August 1974); Raufoss 7–1 HamKam (29 September 1974)
- Longest winning run: Molde (7 games)
- Longest unbeaten run: Molde (13 games)
- Longest winless run: Raufoss (19 games)
- Longest losing run: Raufoss (7 games)
- Highest attendance: 21,362; Rosenborg 2–1 Molde (15 May 1974)
- Lowest attendance: 650; Raufoss 1–2 Start (22 September 1974)
- Average attendance: 5,750 ▲2.9 %

The 1974 1. divisjon was the 30th completed season of Norway's first-tier football league and was contested by 12 teams. The season was won by Viking, one point ahead of the newly promoted team Molde. This was Viking third consecutive league championship, and the fourth total. HamKam, Sarpsborg and Raufoss was relegated to the 1975 2. divisjon.

== Team changes from 1973 ==
Frigg, Lyn and Fredrikstad was relegated from the 1973 Norwegian First Division, and was replaced by Sarpsborg and Molde who won their 1973 2. divisjon groups, in addition to Vålerengen who won the promotion play-off against Bryne and Mjølner.

== Season summary ==
Molde, who were playing in the top-flight for the first time since the 1957–58 season, won their three first matches and were leading the league in 9 of 22 rounds. Molde were in the lead with three matches left to play, despite a 0–2 loss at home against Viking, but when Vålerengen won 4–3 against Molde after a match-winning goal from Terje Olsen in the next match, Viking was the top of the league. Before the last match, Viking was leading one point ahead of Molde, and they won their third consecutive championship after they beat Strømsgodset in the last match. Viking had the opportunity to win the double, but lost the 1974 Norwegian Football Cup final 3–1 against Skeid.

Viking's goalkeeper, Erik Johannessen kept a clean sheet for 672 minutes during the season, which was a Norwegian record for 32 years until Sondre Rossbach of Odd played 730 minutes without conceding a goal in 2016. Molde's Odd Berg became the top goalscorer in the league with 13 goals.

HamKam, Sarpsborg and Raufoss were relegated at the end of the season. This was HamKam's first relegation from the top league, and the club has later been relegated eight times, which is a Norwegian record. Sarpsborg FK had previously been one of the big clubs in Norway, but their spell in the top-flight in 1974 was their last, and for the next 36 years the town of Sarpsborg did not have a first-tier team until Sarpsborg 08 played in Tippeligaen in the 2011 season. Raufoss, who did not win a match until the 20th round, has not been able to play in the top league again.

== Teams and locations ==
Note: Table lists in alphabetical order.

Team	Ap.	Location	Stadium
Brann	22	Bergen	Brann Stadion
HamKam	6	Hamar	Briskeby
Mjøndalen	8	Mjøndalen	Nedre Eiker Stadion
Molde	3	Molde	Molde Stadion
Raufoss	9	Raufoss	Raufoss Stadion
Rosenborg	12	Trondheim	Lerkendal Stadion
Sarpsborg FK	23	Sarpsborg	Sarpsborg Stadion
Skeid	27	Oslo	
Start	7	Kristiansand	Kristiansand Stadion
Strømsgodset	9	Drammen	Marienlyst Stadion
Vålerengen	20	Oslo	Bislett Stadion
Viking	27	Stavanger	Stavanger Stadion

== League table ==
Pos	Team	Pld	W	D	L	GF	GA	GD	Pts	Qualification or relegation
1	Viking (C)	22	11	9	2	31	10	+21	31	Qualification for the European Cup first round
2	Molde	22	12	6	4	40	18	+22	30	Qualification for the UEFA Cup first round
3	Vålerengen	22	12	4	6	33	25	+8	28	Qualification for the UEFA Cup first round
4	Brann	22	9	9	4	36	20	+16	27	
5	Strømsgodset	22	11	5	6	38	28	+10	27	
6	Skeid	22	11	3	8	30	26	+4	25	Qualification for the Cup Winners' Cup first round
7	Start	22	9	6	7	37	31	+6	24	
8	Rosenborg	22	9	5	8	39	31	+8	23	
9	Mjøndalen	22	7	3	12	29	37	−8	17	
10	HamKam (R)	22	5	5	12	21	47	−26	15	Relegation to Second Division
11	Sarpsborg FK (R)	22	4	3	15	21	47	−26	11	Relegation to Second Division
12	Raufoss (R)	22	1	4	17	16	51	−35	6	Relegation to Second Division

Source: NIFS
Rules for classification: 1) points; 2) goal difference; 3) number of goals scored.
(C) Champions; (R) Relegated

== Results ==
Home \ Away	BRA	HAM	MIF	MOL	RAU	ROS	SRP	SKE	IKS	STM	VIK	VÅL
Brann	—	1–1	2–0	0–4	5–1	2–0	3–1	1–2	2–2	0–0	0–0	0–0
HamKam	1–1	—	2–0	1–1	1–0	2–0	0–0	2–1	0–1	1–3	1–3	1–3
Mjøndalen	2–2	6–1	—	0–2	5–1	1–1	0–3	3–1	1–1	1–0	0–2	1–2
Molde	1–0	5–0	2–0	—	2–1	2–1	5–1	0–1	3–0	2–2	0–2	1–1
Raufoss	0–1	7–1	0–1	0–1	—	1–1	0–2	0–3	1–2	0–1	0–1	0–2
Rosenborg	0–3	1–1	1–4	2–1	1–1	—	5–0	1–0	6–1	6–2	3–2	1–0
Sarpsborg	2–5	0–1	3–0	0–1	1–1	0–3	—	2–3	1–3	0–3	1–0	0–1
Skeid	2–2	2–1	3–0	0–2	3–1	2–0	1–1	—	1–0	2–0	0–1	0–2
Start	0–3	5–1	2–4	0–0	5–0	4–0	4–1	1–0	—	1–1	0–0	2–0
Strømsgodset	1–0	3–1	3–0	2–2	5–0	2–1	1–0	1–2	4–2	—	0–0	2–0
Viking	0–0	2–0	2–0	0–0	6–0	0–0	4–2	1–1	0–0	3–1	—	2–1
Vålerengen	0–3	2–1	1–0	4–3	1–1	0–5	3–0	4–0	2–1	4–1	0–0	—

Source: nifs.no (in Norwegian)
Legend: Blue = home team win; Yellow = draw; Red = away team win.

== Season statistics ==
=== Top scorer ===
- (Norway) Odd Berg, Molde – 13 goals

=== Attendances ===
Pos	Team	Total	High	Low	Average	Change
1	Viking	113,100	14,800	7,030	10,282	−11.1%
2	Brann	110,350	13,500	7,500	10,032	+13.9%
3	Strømsgodset	87,446	15,585	4,000	7,950	+0.3%
4	Rosenborg	84,612	21,362	4,000	7,692	−10.3%
5	Vålerengen	78,874	10,709	3,514	7,170	n/a^{2}
6	Start	76,531	13,971	2,686	6,957	+4.8%
7	Molde	58,232	9,800	4,000	5,294	n/a^{2}
8	Skeid	42,343	7,366	735	3,849	+0.2%
9	HamKam	34,986	4,862	1,080	3,181	−16.2%
10	Mjøndalen	28,352	7,100	900	2,577	−20.6%
11	Sarpsborg FK	26,224	3,978	1,130	2,384	n/a^{2}
12	Raufoss	17,954	3,100	650	1,632	−42.0%
	League total	759,004	21,362	650	5,750	+2.9%

Source: nifs.no
Notes:
2: Team played last season in 2. divisjon.
