= SK Nessegutten =

Norwegian sports club

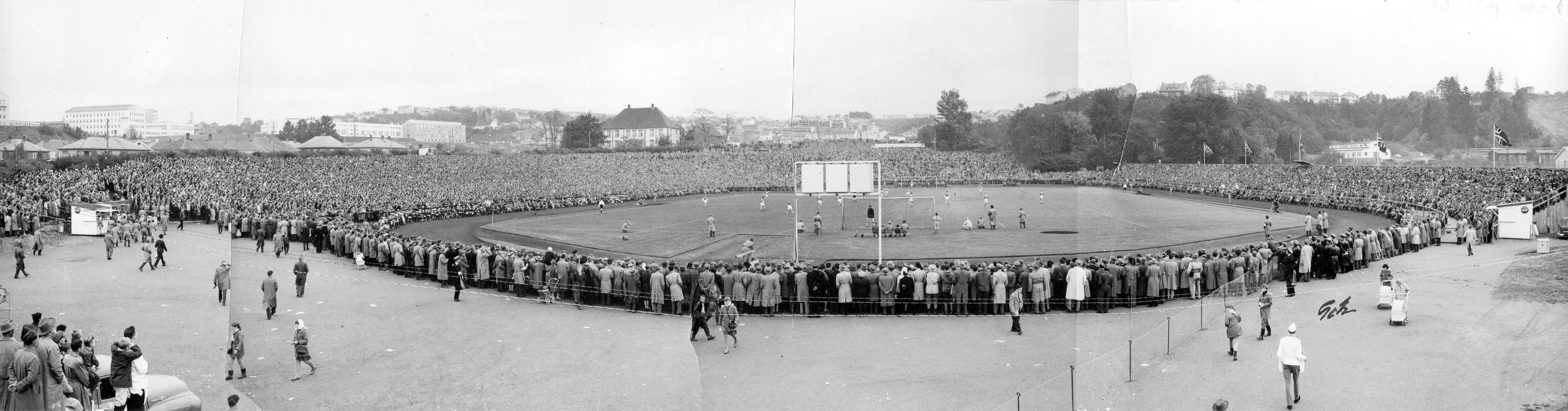
1959 Norwegian Football Cup match against Viking at Lerkendal Stadion

Sportsklubben Nessegutten is a multi-sports club from Levanger Municipality, Norway. It has divisions for football, athletics, handball, orienteering, skiing, speed skating, tennis and artistic gymnastics. It was founded on 20 April 1929.

The football club reached the quarter-finals of the 1959 Norwegian Football Cup. After drawing Viking FK at Ullevaal Stadion, the team lost 0–4 against Viking at Lerkendal Stadion, with nearly 25,000 spectators, most of which were from Innherred. Nessegutten merged their elite football group with IL Sverre in 1996 to create Levanger FK.
