= Greåker IF =

Norwegian football club

- Full name: Greåker Idrettsforening
- Founded: 23 January 1915
- Ground: Moa kunstgress, Sarpsborg
- League: 5. divisjon
- 2025: 5. divisjon Østfold, 9th of 14

Greåker Idrettsforening is a Norwegian football club from Greåker, Sarpsborg, Østfold.

The club was founded on 6 April 1919. The club colours are grey and red. The club has formerly had sections for Nordic skiing, bandy, team handball and amateur wrestling.

The men's football team plays in the 5. divisjon, the sixth tier of Norwegian football. It was formerly a staple in the 3. divisjon, but was last relegated from there in 2008. Its best player has been Raymond Kvisvik. Earlier, after the Second World War II, the club had a spell in the highest league of Norway from 1958–59 to 1961–62.
