= Viking FK =

Association football club in Stavanger, Norway

Viking
- Full name: Viking Fotballklubb
- Nickname: De Mørkeblå (The Dark Blues)
- Founded: 10 August 1899; 127 years ago (as Idrætsklubben Viking)
- Ground: Viking Stadion, Stavanger
- Capacity: 15,900
- Chairman: Jan Henrik Jelsa
- Head coaches: Bjarte Lunde Aarsheim & Morten Jensen
- League: Eliteserien
- 2025: Eliteserien, 1st of 16 (champions)
- Website: www.vikingfotball.no
Home colours	Away colours

Viking Fotballklubb, commonly known as Viking or Viking Stavanger internationally, is a Norwegian professional football club from the city of Stavanger. The club was founded in 1899. It is one of the most successful clubs in Norwegian football, having won 9 Norwegian top division titles, most recently in 2025, and 6 domestic Norwegian Cup titles, most recently in 2019. The club has played more top-flight league games than any other club in Norway. It has played in the top division since the league was established, except for the years 1966–67, 1987–88 and 2018. Notable European successes include knocking English side Chelsea out of the UEFA Cup during the 2002–03 season, knocking out Sporting CP from the same tournament in 1999–2000, and qualifying for the group stages of the 2005–06 UEFA Cup and for the league phase of the 2026–27 UEFA Champions League.

== History ==
=== Early years (1899–1939) ===
Viking was founded in Stavanger in 1899 and played mainly local games in the early years. From the 1930s, the club established itself at the national level, playing in the 1933 cup final, which it lost to Mjøndalen. During the 1930s the club produced several of its best known players, most prominently Reidar Kvammen, who played in Norway's bronze medal winning 1936 Olympic team. His brother Arthur Kvammen was also capped for Norway, while Bernhard Lund later went on to write the club anthem.

=== Post-war success (1945–1959) ===
After the Second World War, Viking became a dominant side in the 1950s, beating Lillestrøm in the 1953 cup final and Sandefjord in the 1959 final, as well as winning the league title in 1957–58. Long-serving goalkeeper Sverre Andersen was the most prominent player in this generation, while Edgar Falch also earned several caps for Norway. Rolf and Kåre Bjørnsen, Asbjørn Skjærpe and Leif Nicolaysen were other prominent players, while a young Olav Nilsen began his remarkable Viking career in 1959. The club attendance record also stems from the semifinal of the 1959 cup, when 18,892 spectators saw Viking beat Odd 4–0.

=== The golden era (1960–1979) ===
While the 1960s was a somewhat quieter decade for Viking, the club returned to dominate Norwegian football in the 1970s. Viking won four straight league titles from 1972 to 1975, as well as the double in 1979. Innovative 1972 manager Kjell Schou-Andreassen has been credited with laying the foundation for the success, with his ideas on cooperative behaviour and his revolutionary use of pacey, attacking full backs Sigbjørn Slinning and Anbjørn Ekeland. However, the team had a new manager every year, with Sverre Andersen, Stuart Williams and Olav Nilsen leading them to the title in the subsequent years, and Tony Knapp managing the 1979 team. Midfielder Olav Nilsen was also a crucial player on the pitch in the first half of the decade, earning the nickname "Olav Viking", while fellow midfielder Svein Kvia was awarded the Norwegian Player of the Year title on several occasions. Arvid Knutsen, Reidar Goa, Hans Edgar Paulsen, Erik Johannessen, Inge Valen, Johannes Vold, Svein Hammerø, Gunnar Berland and Trygve Johannessen were other key players.

=== Ups and downs (1980–1989) ===
The 1980s started well for the club. Kjell Schou Andreassen returned to guide the club to the league title in 1982. They also finished runners-up in the league in 1981 and 1984, and in the cup in 1984, producing players such as Bjarne Berntsen, Per Henriksen, Erik Thorstvedt, Svein Fjælberg, Nils Ove Hellvik, Tonning Hammer, Isak Arne Refvik, Torbjørn Svendsen, Trygve Johannessen and Gary Goodchild. However, the mid-80s saw the club relegated to the Second Division, and 1987 was the club's worst season in recent memory as the club fell to 8th position in the Second Division, while local rivals Bryne won the cup and neighbouring minnows Vidar almost won promotion to the Tippeligaen.

Swedish manager Benny Lennartsson and players Kjell Jonevret and Per Holmberg arrived on large salaries to save the club. The gamble paid off when charismatic striker Alf Kåre Tveit secured a controversial penalty in the 95th minute against Vard in the final league game of the 1988 season. Arild Ravndal converted the spot kick to give Viking the victory and secure promotion, dubbed "the miracle in Haugesund". This signalled the start of a new era, and the club won the cup in 1989 and the league in 1991. Lars Gaute Bø, Roger Nilsen, Kent Christiansen, Egil Fjetland, Jan Fjetland, Trond Egil Soltvedt, Mike McCabe and Børre Meinseth were other key players in a young Viking team.

=== Fluctuating results and European nights (1990–1999) ===
However, many of the young players from the 1991 league winning squad did not manage to live up to their expectations, and the club was almost relegated under new manager Arne Larsen Økland in 1992. Bjarne Berntsen took over as manager in mid-season and secured renewed Tippeligaen status. Viking FK almost knocked the world famous side FC Barcelona, the second sports team with 100 million Facebook followers, out of the European Cup. While the club spent most of the 1990s challenging for Premier League medals, it did however never manage to challenge Rosenborg for the league championships. The 1990s was also the era of player exports in Norwegian football, and Viking made substantial earnings from the sales of striker Egil Østenstad to Southampton for £900,000 in 1996 and goalkeeper Thomas Myhre to Everton for £800,000 in 1997, among others. Gunnar Aase, Lars Gaute Bø, Magnus Svensson, Bjarte Aarsheim, Kenneth Storvik, Roger Nilsen and Ingve Bøe were other key players in this generation.

=== A new millennium (2000–2009) ===
Benny Lennartson returned in 2000 to take over from Dane Poul Erik Andreasen, and this resulted in two bronze medals, a cup title and a memorable European Cup victory over Chelsea. In 2003, Kjell Inge Olsen took over as manager, and the club finished fifth in the league.

At the beginning of the 2004 season, the club moved to its new stadium in Jåttåvågen, named Viking Stadion. At the same time, Englishman Roy Hodgson took over as manager. The club finished ninth in its first season in the new stadium and fifth in the 2005 campaign. Brede Hangeland, Egil Østenstad, Peter Kopteff and Frode Hansen were notable players in this period. At the end of the 2005 season, Roy Hodgson quit his job as Viking coach to take over as Finland manager, and he was replaced by Tom Prahl.

The 2006 season started poorly for Prahl's team and poor soon turned to terrible. With seven matches to go, the once so feared team were situated at the bottom of the table. Former Start coach Tom Nordlie was brought in on a three-month contract to replace Tom Prahl and save Viking from relegation. Under new leadership, Viking won three of the first four games, jumping to tenth place in the standings, but were then defeated consecutively twice to once again fall into the relegation zone. Now lying second from the bottom, it looked like the best the club could hope for was making the play-off spot. The season finale proved to be extraordinary, however, as Viking crushed league runners-up Brann 5–0 at home to pass both HamKam and Odd Grenland in the standings and ultimately retain their spot in the Tippeligaen. Tom Nordlie was considered the favorite for the manager role after the season, but he chose a move to Lillestrøm instead. On 22 November 2006, Viking appointed Uwe Rösler (who was replaced by Tom Nordlie in Lillestrøm just one week earlier) as their new manager.

Under Rösler, Viking returned as a top team, and claimed the 3rd spot on the table in 2007. However, the following seasons were less successful, with Viking ending on 6th place in 2008 and 10th in 2009. They were also surprisingly knocked out of the UEFA Cup by Finnish team FC Honka in 2008, and suffered an embarrassing loss against local rivals Bryne in the domestic cup in 2009. After not living up to the expectations two consecutive seasons, Rösler resigned from his position as manager on 18 November 2009.

=== Instability and financial challenges (2010–2017) ===
In early December 2009, after a period of massive speculation in local newspapers, Viking appointed Åge Hareide, former manager of the Norway national football team, as their new manager. Failing to bring any titles to Stavanger, Hareide was sacked by the club on 9 June 2012.

Kjell Jonevret signed as the club's new manager on 19 June 2012. Jonevret had previously had a spell at Viking during his playing career, from 1988 to 1990. Jonevret spent over four years in charge of a team suffering from the club's increasing financial difficulties, achieving acceptable results despite the difficult financial premises. In August 2015, he renewed his contract until the end of the 2018 season. However, after the 2016 season the club reached a mutual agreement with Jonevret to terminate his contract.

On 24 November 2016, Englishman Ian Burchnall was announced as the club's new manager. Despite Viking signing an inexperienced manager and having financial trouble, Norwegian media predicted Viking to finish mid-table ahead of the 2017 season. However, it proved to be a difficult season for Burchnall, as the team struggled throughout the year, being in the relegation zone from start to finish. Two matches before the end of the 2017 season, Burchnall was fired from the job following the club's relegation to the 1. divisjon. Assistant manager Bjarte Lunde Aarsheim took charge as head coach for the last two matches, achieving a win in Viking's last match in the league.

=== Revival and new successes (2017–present) ===
On 19 December 2017, Bjarne Berntsen left his role as vice president of the Norwegian FA to take over the manager position at Viking. Berntsen has previously served as player, manager and director at the club.

During the months of December 2017 and January 2018, Viking's financial difficulties reached a level where there was a real possibility that the club could go bankrupt. A statement from the club revealed that it would not be able to pay players and staff in February unless a solution was found. The financial situation was eventually resolved in a deal with Stavanger-based bank SR-Bank which allowed the club to refinance its debts. The bank also purchased parts of the stadium and the stadium naming rights.

On 11 November 2018, Viking secured promotion to Eliteserien by placing 1st in 1. divisjon, in a tight ending of the season where two points were the difference between 1st and 3rd place. Viking defeated Kongsvinger 3–1 in front of a packed Viking Stadion on the last day of the season to secure the 1. divisjon title and put the club back in the Eliteserien after just one season on the second tier of Norwegian football. The victory sparked a pitch invasion by the Viking fans. Pitch invasions are extremely uncommon in Norwegian football. On 8 December 2019, Viking won the Norwegian Cup after a 1–0 victory over FK Haugesund. Goalscorer was Zlatko Tripić on a penalty kick.

On 26 November 2020, the club surprisingly decided to terminate Bjarne Berntsen's contract, even though he had taken the club from the second tier to Eliteserien on first attempt and achieved top half finishes in the following two seasons. Berntsen expressed great disappointment over the decision. The club moved to a dual head coach model, with Morten Jensen and Bjarte Lunde Aarsheim jointly in charge of the team. Despite a lot of initial public scepticism about this decision, the duo coached the club to third position in the 2021 Eliteserien, qualifying for the 2022–23 UEFA Europa Conference League.

On 30 November 2025, Viking secured their first league title in 34 years, finishing one point ahead of Bodo/Glimt after a 5–1 win over Vålerenga on the final matchday of the 2025 season. They later qualified for the league phase of the 2026-27 UEFA Champions League.

== Crest and shirt ==
Period	Kit manufacturer	Shirt sponsor
1983–1988	Adidas	Sandnes Trelast
1989–1992	Adidas	SR-Bank
1993–1998	Adidas	Stavanger Energi
1999–2010	Adidas	Lyse
2011–	Diadora	Lyse

The original kit colours in 1899 were all white. This turned out to be problematic at that time. To avoid colour bleeding from the red and yellow club badge when cleaning the white shirts, the badge had to be removed from each shirt prior to washing and then re-attached afterwards. The club therefore changed to dark blue, and is now nicknamed after the dark blue colour of their shirts.

The club badge is shaped like a flag, and remained relatively unchanged from the club's formation in 1899 until 2020. In January 2020, the club introduced a redesigned badge. The flag shape remained, but the font was changed. The oak tree stump graphics were also changed, the year of foundation (1899) was moved and the name of the home city (Stavanger) was made slightly smaller. The traditional red background of the badge was also replaced with a dark blue background matching the colour of the shirts. Two years later, the 2022 edition of the kit reintroduced the red badge background.

From 2011, Diadora is the technical sponsor. The Norwegian power company Lyse has been the club's main shirt sponsor since 1999.

== Stadium ==
Since the 2004 season, Viking Stadion has been Viking's home stadium. Previously, the club played at Stavanger Stadion, which had a capacity of 17,555. Stavanger Stadion had been the club's stadium since the club was founded in 1899.

=== Attendances ===
The first season with Viking Stadion saw the average attendance increase from 6,712 in 2003 to 12,450 in 2004. The average attendance numbers have been around 10,000 since the stadium was inaugurated. The lowest average attendance came in 2017, when Viking finished in 16th place and were relegated from Eliteserien. In 2007, Viking had an average attendance of 15,842, which is the highest in Viking's history. The official supporter club of Viking, is Vikinghordene (the Viking hordes). Other supporter groups are F19 Stavanger, Viking Oslo, Blå Brigade 99 and Vecchia Guardia.

== Rivalries ==
Viking's biggest rivals both locally and historically are Brann, Bryne, Haugesund, Sandnes Ulf, Start and Rosenborg BK. The rivalries with Brann and Haugesund are often referred to as Vestlandsderbyet, the Western Norway derby. The rivalry with Start is commonly known as Sørvestlandsderbyet (the Southwestern Norway derby). Bryne, Haugesund and Sandnes Ulf are all located in Rogaland, the same county as Viking. Bryne and Sandnes Ulf are geographically the two closest rivals.

Bryne is often considered Viking's biggest rival. After the 2003 season, Bryne and Viking did not play against each other in the league for 22 years, even though the clubs met in the cup on several occasions in that period. On 27 July 2025, with Bryne having been promoted back to Eliteserien for the 2025 season, the clubs met in Bryne again 22 years to the day after their previous league meeting. The match ended 1–3, with Viking securing an important away win in the derby.

== Honours ==
- Eliteserien
  - Winners (9): 1957–58, 1972, 1973, 1974, 1975, 1979, 1982, 1991, 2025
  - Runners-up (2): 1981, 1984
  - Third place (10): 1968, 1971, 1978, 1994, 1996, 2000, 2001, 2007, 2021, 2024
- 1. divisjon
  - Winners (3): 1967, 1988, 2018
- Norwegian Cup
  - Winners (6): 1953, 1959, 1979, 1989, 2001, 2019
  - Runners-up (5): 1933, 1947, 1974, 1984, 2000

== Recent seasons ==
Last ten seasons
Season	League										Cup	Other competitions		League top goalscorer(s)	
Season	Division	Pld	W	D	L	GF	GA	GD	Pts	Pos	Cup	Other competitions		League top goalscorer(s)	
Season	Division	Pld	W	D	L	GF	GA	GD	Pts	Pos	Cup	Other competitions		Player	Goals
2016	Tippeligaen	30	12	7	11	33	35	−2	43	8th	3R			Suleiman Abdullahi; Mathias Bringaker; Patrick Pedersen	5
2017	Eliteserien	30	6	6	18	33	57	−24	24	16th	2R			Samuel Adegbenro	6
2018	1. divisjon	30	20	1	9	68	44	+24	61	1st	2R			Tommy Høiland	21
2019	Eliteserien	30	13	8	9	55	42	+13	47	5th	W			Kristian Thorstvedt	10
2020	Eliteserien	30	12	8	10	54	52	+2	44	6th	Cancelled	UEL	2QR	Veton Berisha	16
2021	Eliteserien	30	17	6	7	60	47	+13	57	3rd	SF			Veton Berisha	22
2022	Eliteserien	30	9	8	13	48	54	−6	35	11th	QF	UECL	PO	Veton Berisha	8
2023	Eliteserien	30	18	4	8	61	48	+13	58	4th	4R			Zlatko Tripić	13
2024	Eliteserien	30	16	9	5	61	39	+22	57	3rd	4R			Lars-Jørgen Salvesen	12
2025	Eliteserien	30	22	5	3	77	36	+41	71	1st	SF	UECL	3QR	Peter Christiansen	14
2026 (in progress)	Eliteserien	27	20	2	5	71	30	+41	62	2nd	QF			Peter Christiansen	19

== In European football ==
=== Overall record ===
As of 21 October 2026

Competition	Played	Won	Drew	Lost	GF	GA	GD	Win%
European Cup / UEFA Champions League	19	2	4	13	21	41	−20	10.53
UEFA Cup / UEFA Europa League	51	20	12	19	69	63	+6	39.22
UEFA Conference League	10	5	2	3	24	14	+10	50.00
European Cup Winners' Cup	2	0	0	2	0	5	−5	0.00
Total	82	27	18	37	114	123	−9	32.93

Source: UEFA.com

== Players ==
=== Current squad ===
As of 13 September 2026

Note: Flags indicate national team as defined under FIFA eligibility rules; some limited exceptions apply. Players may hold more than one non-FIFA nationality.

No.	Pos.	Nation	Player
1	GK	NOR	Arild Østbø
2	DF	NOR	Herman Haugen
3	DF	NOR	Viljar Vevatne (vice-captain)
4	DF	NOR	Martin Ove Roseth
5	DF	NOR	Henrik Heggheim
6	DF	AUS	Gianni Stensness
7	MF	NOR	Kristoffer Askildsen
8	MF	NZL	Joe Bell (vice-captain)
9	FW	AUS	Nicholas D'Agostino
10	FW	NOR	Zlatko Tripić (captain)
11	FW	NED	Romano Postema
12	GK	NOR	Erlend Jacobsen
14	FW	NOR	Veton Berisha
16	MF	NOR	Henrik Bjørdal
17	DF	NED	Essiën Bassey

No.	Pos.	Nation	Player
18	DF	NOR	Sondre Bjørshol
19	FW	ISL	Amin Ćosić
20	FW	DEN	Peter Christiansen
21	DF	DEN	Anders Bærtelsen
22	FW	NOR	Erik Botheim
23	FW	NOR	Niklas Fuglestad
24	DF	NOR	Vetle Auklend
25	DF	NOR	Henrik Falchener
26	MF	NOR	Simen Kvia-Egeskog
27	DF	NOR	Jesper Daland (on loan from Cardiff City)
28	DF	NOR	Kristoffer Haugen
29	MF	NOR	Tobias Moi
30	GK	SVK	Ľubomír Belko
33	MF	NOR	Jakob Segadal Hansen
42	FW	GHA	Kelvin Frimpong

=== Out on loan ===
Note: Flags indicate national team as defined under FIFA eligibility rules; some limited exceptions apply. Players may hold more than one non-FIFA nationality.

No.	Pos.	Nation	Player
15	MF	NOR	Ola Visted (at KFUM Oslo until 31 December 2026)
16	MF	NOR	Ruben Alte (at Viborg until 31 May 2027)

No.	Pos.	Nation	Player
22	DF	AUS	Franco Lino (at Melbourne Victory until 30 June 2027)
38	DF	NOR	Fillip Voster Botnen (at Sandnes Ulf until 31 December 2026)

== Personnel ==
=== Technical staff ===
Position	Staff
Head coaches	(Norway) Bjarte Lunde Aarsheim (Norway) Morten Jensen
Assistant coach and analyst	(Norway) Stig Vik Nedrebø
Goalkeeping coach	(Wales) Jason Wyn-Jones
Physiotherapists	(Norway) Halvard Øen Grova (Norway) Kenneth Rosbach (Norway) Petter Søndenå
Doctor	(Norway) Øystein Dale
Chiropractor	(Norway) Tarald Sørenes
Player developer	(Norway) Rune Repvik
Mental coach	(Norway) Frank Heggebø
Equipment manager	(Norway) Stian Refvik

Last updated: 15 January 2025

=== Administrative staff ===
Position	Staff
Chairman	(Norway) Jan Henrik Jelsa
Chief executive officer	(Norway) Eirik Bjørnø
Sporting director	(Norway) Erik Nevland

Last updated: 30 April 2024

== Managerial history ==
- (Norway) Reinhard Andersen (1946)
- (Norway) Sophus Jensen (1947–49)
- (Austria) Frantz Gutkas (1950)
- (Norway) Gunnar Stensland (1951–52)
- (Norway) Georg Monsen (1953–54)
- (Norway) William Danielsen (1955)
- (Norway) Georg Monsen (1956–57)
- (Norway) William Danielsen (1958–59)
- (Norway) Sverre Andersen (1960)
- (Norway) Svend Aage Jespersen (1961)
- (Norway) Georg Monsen (1962–63)
- (Norway) Reidar Kvammen (1964)
- (Norway) Georg Monsen (1965)
- (Norway) Sverre Andersen (1966–70)
- (Norway) Kjell Schou-Andreassen (1971–72)
- (Norway) Sverre Andersen (1973)
- (Wales) Stuart Williams (1974)
- (Norway) Olav Nilsen (1975)
- (Norway) Arvid Knutsen (1976)
- (Norway) Svein Kvia (1977)
- (England) Tony Knapp (1978–1981)
- (Norway) Kjell Schou-Andreassen (1982)
- (Norway) Andreas Morisbak (1983)
- (England) Keith Blunt (1984)
- (Norway) Svein Kvia (1984)
- (England) Bill Foulkes (1985)
- (Norway) Sverre Andersen (1985)
- (Norway) Svein Kvia (1986–87)
- (Norway) Kjell Schou-Andreassen (1987)
- (Sweden) Benny Lennartsson (1988–91)
- (Norway) Arne Larsen Økland (1992)
- (Norway) Bjarne Berntsen (1992–95)
- (Denmark) Poul Erik Andreasen (1996–99)
- (Sweden) Benny Lennartsson (2000–02)
- (Norway) Kjell Inge Olsen (2003–04)
- (Norway) Bjarne Berntsen (interim) (2004)
- (England) Roy Hodgson (2004–05)
- (Sweden) Tom Prahl (2006)
- (Norway) Tom Nordlie (2006)
- (Germany) Uwe Rösler (2007–09)
- (Norway) Åge Hareide (2010–12)
- (Sweden) Kjell Jonevret (2012–16)
- (England) Ian Burchnall (2017)
- (Norway) Bjarte Lunde Aarsheim (interim) (2017)
- (Norway) Bjarne Berntsen (2018–20)
- (Norway) Bjarte Lunde Aarsheim & (Norway) Morten Jensen (2021–)
