= 1938 FIFA World Cup qualification Group 2a =

Football tournament qualification stage

In the 1938 FIFA World Cup qualification Group 2a, the two teams played against each other on a home-and-away basis. The winner Norway qualified for the third FIFA World Cup held in France.

== Matches ==
=== Norway vs Ireland ===
| Norway | 3 — 2 (final score after 90 minutes) | (Republic of Ireland) Ireland |
| Manager: (Norway) Asbjørn Halvorsen Team: 01 - GK - Tom Blohm; 02 - DF - Rolf Johannessen; 03 - DF - Rolf Holmberg; 04 - MF - Frithjof Ulleberg; 05 - MF - Nils Eriksen (capt.); 06 - MF - Rolf Holmberg; 08 - FW - Reidar Kvammen; 10 - FW - Magnar Isaksen; 07 - FW - Odd Frantzen; 09 - FW - Alf Martinsen; 11 - FW - Arne Brustad Substitutes: none Unused Substitutes: GK - Anker Kihle; Scorers: 1-0 Reidar Kvammen (30'); 2-2 Reidar Kvammen (64'); 3-2 Alf Martinsen (78') | Half-time: 1-1 Competition: World Cup qualifier 1938 (Group 2) Date: Sunday; 10 October 1937 Kick off: ? Venue: Ullevaal Stadion, Oslo Attendance: 28000 Referee: Peco Bauwens GER Assistants: ? Match rules: 90 minutes substitutes ? | Manager: (Republic of Ireland) Joe Wickham Team: 01 - GK - George McKenzie; 02 - DF - Joe Williams; 03 - DF - Mick Hoy; 04 - MF - Joe O'Reilly; 05 - MF - Charlie Turner (capt.); 06 - MF - Owen Kinsella; 07 - FW - Tommy Donnelly; 08 - FW - Joey Donnelly; 09 - FW - Jimmy Dunne; 10 - FW - Billy Jordan; 11 - FW - Matty Geoghegan Substitutes: none Unused Substitutes: ? Scorers: 1-1 Matty Geoghegan (36'); 1-2 Jimmy Dunne (49') |

NOTE: Rolf Holmberg missed a penalty (Alf Martinsen was fouled) at the end of the first half.

=== Ireland vs Norway ===
| (Republic of Ireland) Ireland | 3 — 3 (final score after 90 minutes) | Norway |
| Manager: (Republic of Ireland) Joe Wickham Team: 01 - GK - George McKenzie; 02 - DF - Willie O'Neill; 03 - DF - Bill Gorman; 04 - MF - Joe O'Reilly; 05 - MF - Charlie Turner (capt.); 06 - MF - Tom Arrigan; 07 - FW - Kevin O'Flanagan; 08 - FW - Harry Duggan; 09 - FW - Jimmy Dunne; 10 - FW - Johnny Carey; 11 - FW - Tommy Foy Substitutes: none Unused Substitutes: ? Scorers: 1-0 Jimmy Dunne (10'); 2-3 Kevin O'Flanagan (62'); 3-3 Harry Duggan (89') | Half-time: 1-2 Competition: World Cup qualifier 1938 (Group 2) Date: Sunday; 11 November 1937 Kick off: ? Venue: Dalymount Park, Dublin Attendance: 27000 Referee: Thomas Gibbs ENG Assistants: ? Match rules: 90 minutes substitutes ? | Manager: (Norway) Asbjørn Halvorsen Team: 01 - GK - Sverre Nordby; 02 - DF - Rolf Johannessen; 03 - DF - Øivind Holmsen; 04 - MF - Kristian Henriksen; 05 - MF - Nils Eriksen (capt.); 06 - MF - Rolf Holmberg; 08 - FW - Reidar Kvammen; 10 - FW - Odd Frantzen; 07 - FW - Kjell Eeg; 09 - FW - Alf Martinsen; 11 - FW - Jørgen Hval Substitutes: none Unused Substitutes: GK - Anker Kihle; MF - Oddmund Andersen; FW - Torkild Andersen; Scorers: 1-1 Reidar Kvammen (26'); 1-2 Reidar Kvammen (33'); 1-3 Alf Martinsen (49') |

Norway qualified.

== Team stats ==
=== Norway ===
Head coach: (Norway) Asbjørn Halvorsen

| Pos. | Player | DoB | Games played | Goals | Minutes played | Sub off | Sub on | (Republic of Ireland) | (Republic of Ireland) | Club |
|---|---|---|---|---|---|---|---|---|---|---|
| MF | Oddmund Andersen | December 21, 1915 | 0 | 0 | 0 | 0 | 0 | - | B | (Norway) Mjøndalen IF |
| FW | Torkild Andersen | July 20, 1916 | 0 | 0 | 0 | 0 | 0 | - | B | (Norway) Moss FK |
| GK | Tom Blohm | June 29, 1920 | 1 | 0 | 90 | 0 | 0 | 90 | - | (Norway) Hugin FK |
| FW | Arne Brustad | April 14, 1912 | 1 | 0 | 90 | 0 | 0 | 90 | - | (Norway) SFK Lyn |
| FW | Kjell Eeg | September 24, 1910 | 1 | 0 | 90 | 0 | 0 | - | 90 | (Norway) Djerv Bergen |
| MF | Nils Eriksen | March 5, 1911 | 2 | 0 | 180 | 0 | 0 | 90 | 90 | (Norway) Odd Grenland |
| FW | Odd Frantzen | January 20, 1913 | 2 | 0 | 180 | 0 | 0 | 90 | 90 | (Norway) SK Hardy |
| MF | Kristian Henriksen | March 3, 1911 | 1 | 0 | 90 | 0 | 0 | - | 90 | (Norway) Frigg Oslo FK |
| MF | Rolf Holmberg | August 24, 1914 | 2 | 0 | 180 | 0 | 0 | 90 | 90 | (Norway) Odd Grenland |
| DF | Øivind Holmsen | April 28, 1912 | 2 | 0 | 180 | 0 | 0 | 90 | 90 | (Norway) SFK Lyn |
| FW | Jørgen Hval | February 8, 1911 | 1 | 0 | 90 | 0 | 0 | - | 90 | (Norway) Mjøndalen IF |
| FW | Magnar Isaksen | October 13, 1910 | 1 | 0 | 90 | 0 | 0 | 90 | - | (Norway) SFK Lyn |
| DF | Rolf Johannessen | March 15, 1910 | 2 | 0 | 180 | 0 | 0 | 90 | 90 | (Norway) Fredrikstad FK |
| GK | Anker Kihle | April 19, 1917 | 0 | 0 | 0 | 0 | 0 | B | B | (Norway) Storm |
| FW | Reidar Kvammen | July 23, 1914 | 2 | 4 | 180 | 0 | 0 | 90 | 90 | (Norway) Viking FK |
| FW | Alf Martinsen | December 29, 1911 | 2 | 2 | 180 | 0 | 0 | 90 | 90 | (Norway) Lillestrøm SK |
| GK | Sverre Nordby | March 13, 1910 | 1 | 0 | 90 | 0 | 0 | - | 90 | (Norway) Mjøndalen IF |
| MF | Frithjof Ulleberg | September 10, 1911 | 1 | 0 | 90 | 0 | 0 | 90 | - | (Norway) SFK Lyn |

=== Ireland ===
Head coach: (Republic of Ireland) Joe Wickham

| Pos. | Player | DoB | Games played | Goals | Minutes played | Sub off | Sub on | (Norway) | (Norway) | Club |
|---|---|---|---|---|---|---|---|---|---|---|
| MF | Tom Arrigan | | 1 | 0 | 90 | 0 | 0 | - | 90 | (Republic of Ireland) Waterford United |
| FW | Johnny Carey | February 23, 1919 | 1 | 0 | 90 | 0 | 0 | - | 90 | (England) /2 Manchester United |
| FW | Joey Donnelly | | 1 | 0 | 90 | 0 | 0 | 90 | - | (Republic of Ireland) Dundalk F.C. |
| FW | Tommy Donnelly | | 1 | 0 | 90 | 0 | 0 | 90 | - | (Republic of Ireland) Drumcondra F.C. |
| FW | Harry Duggan | June 8, 1903 | 1 | 1 | 90 | 0 | 0 | - | 90 | (England) /3 Newport County |
| FW | Jimmy Dunne | September 3, 1905 | 2 | 2 | 180 | 0 | 0 | 90 | 90 | (Republic of Ireland) Shamrock Rovers |
| FW | Tommy Foy | | 1 | 0 | 90 | 0 | 0 | - | 90 | (Republic of Ireland) Shamrock Rovers |
| FW | Matty Geoghegan | | 1 | 1 | 90 | 0 | 0 | 90 | - | (Republic of Ireland) St James's Gate F.C. |
| DF | Bill Gorman | July 13, 1911 | 1 | 0 | 90 | 0 | 0 | - | 90 | (England) /2 Bury F.C. |
| DF | Mick Hoy | | 1 | 0 | 90 | 0 | 0 | 90 | - | (Republic of Ireland) Dundalk F.C. |
| FW | Billy Jordan | | 1 | 0 | 90 | 0 | 0 | 90 | - | (Republic of Ireland) Bohemian F.C. |
| FW | Owen Kinsella | | 1 | 0 | 90 | 0 | 0 | 90 | - | (Republic of Ireland) Shamrock Rovers |
| GK | George McKenzie | | 2 | 0 | 180 | 0 | 0 | 90 | 90 | (England) /3 Southend United |
| FW | Kevin O'Flanagan | June 10, 1919 | 1 | 1 | 90 | 0 | 0 | - | 90 | (Republic of Ireland) Bohemian F.C. |
| DF | Willie O'Neill | | 1 | 0 | 90 | 0 | 0 | - | 90 | (Republic of Ireland) Dundalk F.C. |
| MF | Joe O'Reilly | | 2 | 0 | 180 | 0 | 0 | 90 | 90 | (Republic of Ireland) St James's Gate F.C. |
| MF | Charlie Turner | | 2 | 0 | 180 | 0 | 0 | 90 | 90 | (England) /3 Southend United |
| DF | Joe Williams | | 1 | 0 | 90 | 0 | 0 | 90 | - | (Republic of Ireland) Shamrock Rovers |
