= List of Norway national football team World Cup and European Championship squads =

The World Cup and European Championship, are the primary competitive tournaments the Norway national football team enters. The finals of both tournaments held every four years in alternate even numbered years. Excluding the tournament years in which Norway either did not enter or failed to qualify for the finals, the Norway national team has nominated the following squads of players to compete in the finals:

== 1938 World Cup ==
- Progress: Round of 16

Head coach: Asbjørn Halvorsen

No.	Pos.	Player	Date of birth (age)	Caps	Club
-	FW	Arne Brustad	14 April 1912 (aged 26)	19	(Norway) Lyn
-	FW	Knut Brynildsen	23 July 1917 (aged 20)	1	(Norway) Fredrikstad
-	DF	Nils Eriksen	5 March 1911 (aged 27)	34	(Norway) Odd
-	FW	Odd Frantzen	20 January 1913 (aged 25)	14	(Norway) Hardy
-	MF	Kristian Henriksen	3 March 1911 (aged 27)	12	(Norway) Lyn
-	MF	Rolf Holmberg	24 August 1914 (aged 23)	18	(Norway) Odd
-	DF	Øivind Holmsen	28 April 1912 (aged 26)	22	(Norway) Lyn
-	FW	Arne Ileby	2 December 1913 (aged 24)	0	(Norway) Fredrikstad
-	FW	Magnar Isaksen	13 October 1910 (aged 27)	12	(Norway) Lyn
-	DF	Rolf Johannessen	15 March 1910 (aged 28)	11	(Norway) Fredrikstad
-	GK	Henry Johansen	21 July 1904 (aged 33)	44	(Norway) Vålerengen
-	DF	Jørgen Juve	22 November 1906 (aged 31)	45	(Norway) Lyn
-	FW	Reidar Kvammen	23 July 1914 (aged 23)	29	(Norway) Viking
-	GK	Sverre Nordby	13 March 1910 (aged 28)	2	(Norway) Mjøndalen
-	DF	Roald Amundsen	18 September 1913 (aged 24)	0	(Norway) Mjøndalen
-	DF	Oddmund Andersen	21 December 1915 (aged 22)	1	(Norway) Mjøndalen
-	MF	Gunnar Andreassen	5 January 1913 (aged 25)	0	(Norway) Fredrikstad
-	FW	Hjalmar Andresen	18 July 1914 (aged 23)	0	(Norway) Sarpsborg
-	MF	Sigurd Hansen	23 June 1913 (aged 24)	0	(Norway) Fram Larvik
-	GK	Anker Kihle	19 April 1917 (aged 21)	0	(Norway) Storm
-	FW	Alf Martinsen	29 December 1911 (aged 26)	17	(Norway) Lillestrøm
-	MF	Sverre Berglie	21 October 1910 (aged 27)	0	(Norway) Drafn

1. Note: This player stayed home on reserve. Only 14 members of the squad actually travelled to France.

== 1994 World Cup ==
- Progress: Group stage

Head coach: Egil Olsen

No.	Pos.	Player	Date of birth (age)	Caps	Club
1	GK	Erik Thorstvedt	28 October 1962 (aged 31)	84	(England) Tottenham Hotspur
2	DF	Gunnar Halle	11 August 1965 (aged 28)	44	(England) Oldham Athletic
3	DF	Erland Johnsen	5 April 1967 (aged 27)	20	(England) Chelsea
4	DF	Rune Bratseth (c)	19 March 1961 (aged 33)	57	(Germany) Werder Bremen
5	DF	Stig Inge Bjørnebye	11 December 1969 (aged 24)	34	(England) Liverpool
6	FW	Jostein Flo	3 October 1964 (aged 29)	23	(England) Sheffield United
7	MF	Erik Mykland	21 July 1971 (aged 22)	25	(Norway) Start
8	MF	Øyvind Leonhardsen	17 August 1970 (aged 23)	29	(Norway) Rosenborg
9	FW	Jan Åge Fjørtoft	10 January 1967 (aged 27)	50	(England) Swindon Town
10	MF	Kjetil Rekdal	6 November 1968 (aged 25)	32	(Belgium) Lierse
11	FW	Mini Jakobsen	8 November 1965 (aged 28)	44	(Switzerland) Young Boys
12	GK	Frode Grodås	24 October 1964 (aged 29)	12	(Norway) Lillestrøm
13	GK	Ola By Rise	14 November 1960 (aged 33)	25	(Norway) Rosenborg
14	DF	Roger Nilsen	8 August 1969 (aged 24)	20	(England) Sheffield United
15	DF	Karl Petter Løken	14 August 1966 (aged 27)	32	(Norway) Rosenborg
16	FW	Gøran Sørloth	16 July 1962 (aged 31)	54	(Turkey) Bursaspor
17	DF	Dan Eggen	13 January 1970 (aged 24)	2	(Denmark) Brøndby
18	DF	Alf-Inge Haaland	23 November 1972 (aged 21)	3	(England) Nottingham Forest
19	MF	Roar Strand	2 February 1970 (aged 24)	1	(Norway) Rosenborg
20	DF	Henning Berg	1 September 1969 (aged 24)	16	(England) Blackburn Rovers
21	FW	Sigurd Rushfeldt	11 December 1972 (aged 21)	1	(Norway) Tromsø
22	MF	Lars Bohinen	8 September 1969 (aged 24)	29	(England) Nottingham Forest

== 1998 World Cup ==
- Progress: Round of 16

Head coach: Egil Olsen

No.	Pos.	Player	Date of birth (age)	Caps	Club
1	GK	Frode Grodås (captain)	24 October 1964 (aged 33)	39	(England) Tottenham Hotspur
2	DF	Gunnar Halle	11 August 1965 (aged 32)	60	(England) Leeds United
3	DF	Ronny Johnsen	10 June 1969 (aged 29)	33	(England) Manchester United
4	DF	Henning Berg	1 September 1969 (aged 28)	52	(England) Manchester United
5	DF	Stig Inge Bjørnebye	11 December 1969 (aged 28)	62	(England) Liverpool
6	MF	Ståle Solbakken	27 February 1968 (aged 30)	34	(Denmark) AaB
7	MF	Erik Mykland	21 July 1971 (aged 26)	54	(Greece) Panathinaikos
8	MF	Øyvind Leonhardsen	17 August 1970 (aged 27)	55	(England) Liverpool
9	FW	Tore André Flo	15 June 1973 (aged 24)	25	(England) Chelsea
10	MF	Kjetil Rekdal	6 November 1968 (aged 29)	66	(Germany) Hertha BSC
11	MF	Mini Jakobsen	8 November 1965 (aged 32)	64	(Norway) Rosenborg
12	GK	Thomas Myhre	16 October 1973 (aged 24)	1	(England) Everton
13	GK	Espen Baardsen	7 December 1977 (aged 20)	1	(England) Tottenham Hotspur
14	DF	Vegard Heggem	13 July 1975 (aged 22)	1	(Norway) Rosenborg
15	DF	Dan Eggen	13 January 1970 (aged 28)	13	(Spain) Celta Vigo
16	MF	Jostein Flo	3 October 1964 (aged 33)	44	(Norway) Strømsgodset
17	MF	Håvard Flo	4 April 1970 (aged 28)	9	(Germany) Werder Bremen
18	FW	Egil Østenstad	2 January 1972 (aged 26)	13	(England) Southampton
19	DF	Erik Hoftun	3 March 1969 (aged 29)	1	(Norway) Rosenborg
20	FW	Ole Gunnar Solskjær	26 February 1973 (aged 25)	13	(England) Manchester United
21	MF	Vidar Riseth	21 April 1972 (aged 26)	4	(Austria) LASK Linz
22	MF	Roar Strand	2 February 1970 (aged 28)	5	(Norway) Rosenborg

== 2000 European Championship ==
- Progress: Group stage

Manager: Nils Johan Semb

No.	Pos.	Player	Date of birth (age)	Caps	Club
1	GK	Thomas Myhre	16 October 1973 (aged 26)	10	(England) Everton
2	DF	André Bergdølmo	13 October 1971 (aged 28)	24	(Norway) Rosenborg
3	DF	Bjørn Otto Bragstad	5 January 1971 (aged 29)	11	(Norway) Rosenborg
4	DF	Henning Berg (captain)	1 September 1969 (aged 30)	70	(England) Manchester United
5	DF	Trond Andersen	6 January 1975 (aged 25)	8	(England) Wimbledon
6	MF	Roar Strand	2 February 1970 (aged 30)	23	(Norway) Rosenborg
7	MF	Erik Mykland	21 July 1971 (aged 28)	72	(Greece) Panathinaikos
8	MF	Ståle Solbakken	27 February 1968 (aged 32)	57	(Denmark) AaB
9	FW	Tore André Flo	15 June 1973 (aged 26)	48	(England) Chelsea
10	MF	Kjetil Rekdal	6 November 1968 (aged 31)	83	(Norway) Vålerenga
11	MF	Bent Skammelsrud	18 May 1966 (aged 34)	35	(Norway) Rosenborg
12	GK	Frode Olsen	12 October 1967 (aged 32)	14	(Spain) Sevilla
13	GK	Morten Bakke	16 December 1968 (aged 31)	1	(Norway) Molde
14	DF	Vegard Heggem	13 July 1975 (aged 24)	18	(England) Liverpool
15	MF	John Arne Riise	24 September 1980 (aged 19)	5	(France) Monaco
16	DF	Dan Eggen	13 January 1970 (aged 30)	17	(Spain) Deportivo Alavés
17	FW	John Carew	5 September 1979 (aged 20)	12	(Norway) Rosenborg
18	FW	Steffen Iversen	10 November 1976 (aged 23)	15	(England) Tottenham Hotspur
19	MF	Eirik Bakke	13 September 1977 (aged 22)	5	(England) Leeds United
20	FW	Ole Gunnar Solskjær	26 February 1973 (aged 27)	30	(England) Manchester United
21	MF	Vidar Riseth	21 April 1972 (aged 28)	25	(Scotland) Celtic
22	DF	Stig Inge Bjørnebye	11 December 1969 (aged 30)	71	(England) Liverpool

== 2026 World Cup ==
- Progress: Quarter-finals

Head coach: Ståle Solbakken

No.	Pos.	Player	Date of birth (age)	Caps	Goals	Club
1	GK	Ørjan Nyland	10 September 1990 (aged 35)	71	0	(Royal Spanish Football Federation) Sevilla
2	MF	Morten Thorsby	5 May 1996 (aged 30)	31	0	(Italian Football Federation) Cremonese
3	DF	Kristoffer Ajer	17 April 1998 (aged 28)	52	2	(The Football Association) Brentford
4	DF	Leo Østigård	28 November 1999 (aged 26)	38	1	(Italian Football Federation) Genoa
5	DF	David Møller Wolfe	23 April 2002 (aged 24)	22	1	(The Football Association) Wolverhampton Wanderers
6	MF	Patrick Berg	24 November 1997 (aged 28)	43	0	(Norwegian Football Federation) Bodø/Glimt
7	FW	Alexander Sørloth	5 December 1995 (aged 30)	72	26	(Royal Spanish Football Federation) Atlético Madrid
8	MF	Sander Berge	14 February 1998 (aged 28)	66	1	(The Football Association) Fulham
9	FW	Erling Haaland	21 July 2000 (aged 25)	50	55	(The Football Association) Manchester City
10	MF	Martin Ødegaard (captain)	17 December 1998 (aged 27)	68	5	(The Football Association) Arsenal
11	FW	Jørgen Strand Larsen	6 February 2000 (aged 26)	28	6	(The Football Association) Crystal Palace
12	GK	Sander Tangvik	29 November 2002 (aged 23)	0	0	(German Football Association) Hamburger SV
13	GK	Egil Selvik	30 July 1997 (aged 28)	7	0	(The Football Association) Watford
14	MF	Fredrik Aursnes	10 December 1995 (aged 30)	22	1	(Portuguese Football Federation) Benfica
15	DF	Fredrik André Bjørkan	21 August 1998 (aged 27)	21	1	(Norwegian Football Federation) Bodø/Glimt
16	DF	Marcus Holmgren Pedersen	16 July 2000 (aged 25)	32	0	(Italian Football Federation) Torino
17	DF	Torbjørn Heggem	12 January 1999 (aged 27)	15	0	(Italian Football Federation) Bologna
18	MF	Kristian Thorstvedt	13 March 1999 (aged 27)	37	4	(Italian Football Federation) Sassuolo
19	MF	Thelo Aasgaard	2 May 2002 (aged 24)	8	5	(Scottish Football Association) Rangers
20	FW	Antonio Nusa	17 April 2005 (aged 21)	24	8	(German Football Association) RB Leipzig
21	MF	Andreas Schjelderup	1 June 2004 (aged 22)	12	1	(Portuguese Football Federation) Benfica
22	MF	Oscar Bobb	12 July 2003 (aged 22)	20	2	(The Football Association) Fulham
23	MF	Jens Petter Hauge	12 October 1999 (aged 26)	15	1	(Norwegian Football Federation) Bodø/Glimt
24	DF	Sondre Langås	2 February 2001 (aged 25)	3	0	(The Football Association) Derby County
25	DF	Henrik Falchener	8 May 2003 (aged 23)	1	0	(Norwegian Football Federation) Viking
26	FW	Julian Ryerson	17 November 1997 (aged 28)	43	1	(German Football Association) Borussia Dortmund

== See also ==
- List of Norway international footballers (by years/caps/goals) (25 caps and over)
