= List of Norway international footballers (10–24 caps) =

The Norway national football team represents Norway in international association football. It is fielded by The Football Association of Norway, NFF, the governing body of football in Norway, and competes as a member of the Union of European Football Associations (UEFA), which encompasses the countries of Europe. Norway competed for the first time on 12 July 1908, in a match the team lost 3–11 against Sweden.

Norway have competed in numerous competitions, and all players who have played between ten and twenty-four matches, either as a member of the starting eleven or as a substitute, are listed below. Each player's details include his usual playing position while with the team, the number of caps earned and goals scored in all international matches, and details of the first and most recent matches played in. The names are initially ordered by number of caps (in descending order), then by date of debut, then by alphabetical order. All statistics are correct up to 12 July 2026.

== Key ==
Player
This colour background and the * symbol indicate that the player was active at club level as at the date specified above.

Positions key
Pre-1960s		1960s–	
GK	Goalkeeper		
FB	Full back	DF	Defender
HB	Half back	MF	Midfielder
FW	Forward		

Position
Playing positions are listed according to the tactical formations that were employed at the time. Thus the change in the names of defensive and midfield positions reflects the tactical evolution that occurred from the 1960s onwards.
Caps and goals
Caps and goals comprise those in the FIFA World Cup and UEFA European Championship, their associated qualification matches and international friendly tournaments and matches.

== Players ==
Norway national football team players with 10 to 24 caps
Player	Pos.	Caps	Goals	Debut		Last or most recent match		Refs.
Player	Pos.	Caps	Goals	Date	Opponent	Date	Opponent	Refs.
Kjeld Kjos	FB / HB	24	0	23 October 1927	Germany	5 July 1936	Sweden	
Erland Johnsen	FW	24	2	6 May 1987	Turkey	15 November 1995	Netherlands	
Frank Strandli	FW	24	3	7 January 1992	Egypt	22 January 1999	Estonia	
Tommy Svindal Larsen	MF	24	0	24 April 1996	Spain	7 February 2007	Croatia	
Ola Dybwad-Olsen	FW	23	10	9 June 1968	Poland	23 February 1972	Israel	
Gabriel Høyland	MF	23	3	8 August 1974	Sweden	15 June 1982	Denmark	
Jan Berg	MF	23	0	13 November 1982	Kuwait	7 February 1990	Malta	
Kåre Ingebrigtsen	MF	23	1	7 November 1990	Tunisia	22 July 1995	France	
Henning Hauger	MF	23	0	25 January 2006	Mexico	2 September 2011	Iceland	
Jonas Svensson *	DF	23	1	1 June 2016	Iceland	2 June 2021	Luxembourg	
Johnny Helgesen	FW	22	7	17 June 1917	Denmark	7 June 1928	Sweden	
Torgeir Torgersen	GK	22	0	11 June 1947	Poland	26 November 1950	Republic of Ireland	
Arne Dokken	FW	22	2	28 August 1975	Soviet Union	12 September 1984	Switzerland	
Arne Erlandsen	DF	22	1	16 May 1979	Republic of Ireland	28 October 1987	East Germany	
Hans Herman Henriksen	DF	22	0	17 December 1984	Egypt	28 September 1988	France	
Ole Martin Årst	FW	22	2	31 January 2000	Iceland	7 February 2007	Croatia	
Magne Hoseth	MF	22	1	25 April 2001	Bulgaria	5 September 2009	Iceland	
Andreas Hanche-Olsen *	DF	22	0	18 November 2020	Austria	14 October 2025	New Zealand	
Fredrik Bjørkan *	DF	22	1	6 June 2021	Greece	26 June 2026	France	
Ragnar Hvidsten	FW	21	2	5 November 1950	Yugoslavia	25 September 1955	Sweden	
Jan Derek Sørensen	MF	21	0	8 September 1999	Slovenia	9 October 2004	Scotland	
Kaare Engebretsen	FW	20	8	8 June 1913	Sweden	27 June 1920	Sweden	
Michael Paulsen	MF	20	1	12 June 1919	Denmark	15 June 1924	Germany	
Rolf Johannessen	FB	20	0	21 June 1931	Germany	21 October 1945	Sweden	
Odd Frantzen	MF	20	5	7 August 1936	Germany	22 October 1939	Denmark	
Tom Blohm	GK	20	0	5 September 1937	Finland	21 July 1952	Sweden	
Pål Lydersen	DF	20	1	22 August 1990	Sweden	16 November 1994	Belarus	
Vegard Heggem	DF	20	1	25 February 1998	Finland	18 June 2000	Yugoslavia	
Jon Knudsen	GK	20	0	11 October 2008	Scotland	9 February 2011	Poland	
Valon Berisha *	MF	20	0	15 January 2012	Denmark	5 June 2016	Belgium	
Jo Inge Berget *	FW	20	2	18 January 2012	Thailand	14 November 2017	Slovakia	
Torbjørn Heggem *	DF	20	0	13 October 2024	Austria	12 July 2026	England	
Ingolf Pedersen	GK	19	0	16 June 1912	Sweden	7 October 1917	Denmark	
Rolf Aas	HB	19	2	23 June 1912	Hungary	16 September 1923	Sweden	
Asbjørn Halvorsen	FB / HB	19	0	26 May 1918	Sweden	4 November 1923	Germany	
Hans Nordahl	FW	19	8	2 October 1938	Sweden	31 October 1954	Denmark	
Gunnar Dahlen	HB	19	4	7 September 1947	Finland	21 July 1952	Sweden	
Oddvar Hansen	FB	19	0	12 June 1948	Denmark	7 June 1954	Sweden	
Arne Kotte	FW	19	3	30 August 1953	Finland	5 November 1961	Malta	
Jan Fuglset	FW	19	6	17 June 1970	Finland	4 September 1974	Northern Ireland	
Jan Hansen	MF	19	0	13 August 1975	Sweden	2 July 1981	Finland	
Ørjan Berg	MF	19	1	1 June 1988	Republic of Ireland	4 February 2000	Sweden	
Fredrik Winsnes	MF	19	0	24 January 2001	South Korea	9 September 2009	Macedonia	
Knut Brynildsen	FW	18	10	3 November 1935	Switzerland	6 August 1948	United States	
Per Bredesen	FW	18	7	19 June 1949	Yugoslavia	30 September 1951	Sweden	
Rolf Bjørn Backe	FW	18	5	21 August 1959	Iceland	26 August 1962	Finland	
Stein Kollshaugen	FW	18	7	26 October 1979	Finland	31 July 1984	France	
Egil Østenstad	FW	18	6	11 August 1993	Faroe Islands	7 September 2005	Scotland	
Espen Johnsen	GK	18	0	22 May 2003	Finland	29 January 2006	United States	
Fredrik Strømstad	MF	18	2	12 October 2005	Belarus	11 February 2009	Germany	
Andreas Schjelderup *	FW	18	2	5 June 2024	Kosovo	12 July 2026	England	
Per Holm	HB	17	1	26 May 1918	Sweden	9 June 1926	Sweden	
Frank Olafsen	DF	17	0	5 November 1967	Sweden	2 August 1973	Iceland	
Tom Gulbrandsen	MF	17	0	14 November 1987	Bulgaria	12 September 1990	Soviet Union	
Jan Ove Pedersen	MF	17	1	26 April 1988	Sweden	19 January 1994	Costa Rica	
Harald Martin Brattbakk	FW	17	5	6 February 1995	Estonia	31 March 2004	Serbia and Montenegro	
Jarl André Storbæk	DF	17	0	22 January 2005	Kuwait	28 May 2008	Uruguay	
Magnus Wolff Eikrem *	MF	17	0	15 January 2012	Denmark	31 August 2016	Belarus	
Ola Kamara *	FW	17	7	11 October 2013	Slovenia	10 June 2019	Faroe Islands	
Aron Dønnum *	FW	17	2	2 June 2021	Luxembourg	13 October 2025	Estonia	
Harald Strøm	FW	16	5	6 October 1918	Denmark	15 June 1927	Finland	
Martin Johansen	FB	16	0	30 September 1923	Denmark	30 October 1927	Denmark	
Egil Lærum	HB	16	0	16 June 1946	Denmark	30 September 1951	Sweden	
Harry Kure	HB	16	5	23 August 1951	Yugoslavia	3 November 1957	Bulgaria	
Egil Olsen	MF	16	0	11 October 1964	Denmark	27 October 1971	Hungary	
Rune Ottesen	MF	16	1	24 March 1976	Republic of Ireland	2 July 1981	Finland	
Vadim Demidov	DF	16	0	28 May 2008	Uruguay	15 August 2012	Greece	
Bjørn Maars Johnsen *	FW	16	5	10 June 2017	Czech Republic	15 October 2019	Romania	
Jens Petter Hauge *	MF	16	1	11 October 2020	Romania	26 June 2026	France	
Herbert Lunde	HB	15	2	10 September 1922	Denmark	29 September 1929	Sweden	
Olav Gundersen	HB	15	1	23 October 1927	Germany	5 November 1933	Germany	
Sverre Hansen	HB	15	7	11 June 1933	Denmark	3 August 1936	Turkey	
Trygve Arnesen	HB	15	4	17 June 1938	Finland	18 May 1949	England	
Reidar Kristiansen	FB / HB	15	0	8 May 1955	Hungary	7 July 1959	Iceland	
Rolf Birger Pedersen	FW	15	5	28 May 1958	Netherlands	16 May 1962	Netherlands	
Finn Seemann	FW	15	4	4 September 1963	Poland	11 November 1970	France	
Kjetil Hasund	FW	15	3	18 September 1966	Sweden	27 October 1971	Hungary	
Tom Jacobsen	MF	15	0	8 September 1971	France	12 May 1982	West Germany	
Helge Skuseth	FW	15	3	3 November 1973	Luxembourg	16 June 1976	Sweden	
Roy Amundsen	GK	15	0	9 May 1979	Portugal	17 June 1981	Switzerland	
Morten Vinje	DF	15	0	16 May 1979	Republic of Ireland	29 October 1980	Switzerland	
Tore André Dahlum	FW	15	6	12 September 1990	Soviet Union	5 June 1999	Albania	
Bjørn Otto Bragstad	DF	15	0	20 January 1999	Israel	16 August 2000	Finland	
Simen Brenne	MF	15	1	24 March 2007	Bosnia and Herzegovina	21 January 2012	South Korea	
Sigurd Wathne	GK	14	0	26 May 1918	Sweden	31 August 1920	Italy	
Egil Brenna Lund	FB	14	0	10 October 1926	Poland	24 September 1933	Sweden	
Magnar Isaksen	FW	14	5	26 July 1936	Sweden	9 November 1938	England	
Frithjof Ulleberg	FW	14	0	26 July 1936	Sweden	24 October 1937	Germany	
Henry Johannessen	FW	14	7	28 July 1946	Luxembourg	14 August 1955	Finland	
Hugo Hansen	DF	14	0	4 June 1986	Romania	27 March 1990	Northern Ireland	
Ardian Gashi	MF	14	0	22 January 2004	Sweden	6 September 2013	Cyprus	
Håvard Nielsen *	FW	14	2	14 November 2012	Hungary	6 September 2015	Croatia	
Iver Fossum *	MF	14	1	29 May 2016	Portugal	18 November 2019	Malta	
Per Helsing	HB	13	1	24 October 1915	Sweden	29 June 1919	Sweden	
Einar Wilhelms	FW	13	5	13 June 1920	Denmark	4 November 1923	Germany	
Einar Andersen	FW	13	4	29 May 1927	Denmark	17 June 1932	Finland	
Sverre Berg-Johannessen	FW	13	3	26 June 1927	Sweden	6 September 1931	Finland	
Jan Christiansen	MF	13	0	21 July 1969	Iceland	31 October 1973	Belgium	
Erling Meirik	DF	13	0	23 February 1972	Israel	7 July 1975	Iceland	
Vegard Skogheim	MF	13	1	17 December 1984	Egypt	4 February 1992	Bermuda	
Trond Sollied	DF	13	1	22 May 1985	Sweden	18 November 1987	Turkey	
Charles Herlofson	FB	12	0	11 September 1910	Sweden	24 October 1915	Sweden	
Hugo Hofstad	GK	12	0	17 June 1923	Finland	19 September 1926	Denmark	
Ragnar Larsen	HB	12	1	4 July 1954	Iceland	18 October 1959	Sweden	
Vidar Hansen	DF	12	0	26 October 1979	Finland	1 May 1984	Luxembourg	
Egil Johansen	MF	12	1	20 June 1984	Iceland	12 August 1987	Sweden	
Håkon Opdal	GK	12	0	15 November 2006	Serbia	26 March 2008	Montenegro	
Mathias Normann *	MF	12	1	5 September 2019	Malta	25 March 2022	Slovakia	
Ragnar Nikolay Larsen	DF / MF	11	2	5 September 1948	Finland	4 November 1962	Sweden	
Tore Halvorsen	FB	11	0	22 May 1957	Bulgaria	20 May 1959	Austria	
John Krogh	MF	11	4	21 June 1962	Sweden	15 September 1963	Denmark	
Per Haftorsen	GK	11	0	27 August 1969	Poland	1 November 1972	Netherlands	
Tor Brevik	DF	11	0	16 May 1979	Republic of Ireland	12 November 1983	East Germany	
Raymond Kvisvik	MF	11	2	2 February 2000	Denmark	29 January 2006	United States	
André Hansen	GK	11	0	12 January 2013	Zambia	29 March 2022	Armenia	
Adama Diomande *	FW	11	1	12 June 2015	Azerbaijan	26 March 2017	Northern Ireland	
Fredrik Midtsjø *	MF	11	0	24 March 2016	Estonia	6 June 2021	Greece	
Stian Rode Gregersen *	DF	11	0	27 March 2021	Turkey	25 March 2025	Israel	
Ola Solbakken *	FW	11	1	13 November 2021	Latvia	12 October 2023	Cyprus	
Sverre Nordby	GK	10	0	24 October 1937	Germany	22 October 1939	Denmark	
Finn Moen	FB	10	0	22 October 1939	Denmark	6 August 1948	United States	
Wily Olsen	FW	10	1	11 September 1949	Denmark	28 June 1956	Romania	
Finn Gundersen	HB	10	2	11 September 1955	Denmark	4 November 1959	Netherlands	
Bjørn Odmar Andersen	MF	10	0	16 May 1961	Mexico	15 September 1963	Denmark	
Erik Hagen	MF	10	0	3 July 1962	Malta	13 May 1964	Republic of Ireland	
Tor Alsaker-Nøstdahl	HB	10	0	12 November 1967	Portugal	1 November 1972	Netherlands	
Per Egil Nygård	GK	10	0	31 May 1978	Denmark	12 November 1983	East Germany	
Per Henriksen	DF	10	0	15 June 1983	Finland	20 December 1984	Egypt	
Joar Vaadal	FW	10	2	20 June 1984	Iceland	14 October 1986	Soviet Union	
Arve Seland	FW	10	1	29 July 1984	Chile	16 June 1987	France	
Erik Pedersen	DF	10	0	12 September 1990	Soviet Union	4 February 1992	Bermuda	
Pa-Modou Kah	DF	10	1	24 January 2001	South Korea	6 February 2008	Wales	
Azar Karadas	DF / FW	10	1	24 January 2001	South Korea	28 May 2008	Uruguay	
Bård Borgersen	DF	10	2	6 October 2001	Armenia	1 March 2006	Senegal	
Jone Samuelsen	MF	10	0	27 May 2014	France	13 October 2015	Italy	
Veton Berisha *	FW	10	1	29 May 2016	Portugal	12 June 2022	Sweden	

== See also ==
- List of Norway international footballers, covering players with twenty-five or more caps
- List of Norway international footballers (2–9 caps)
- List of Norway international footballers with one cap
