= History of the Norway national football team =

An Olympic team achieved third place in the 1936 Olympics, after beating the hosts Germany earlier in the tournament.

At its height in the mid-90s the team was even ranked second on the FIFA World Rankings. Olsen started his training career with Norway with a 6–1 home victory against surprise 1990 quarter-finalists Cameroon on 31 October 1990 and ended it on 27 June 1998 after a 0–1 defeat against Italy in the second stage of the 1998 FIFA World Cup.

In the 1994 World Cup in the United States, Norway was knocked out at the group stage after a win against Mexico, a defeat against Italy and a draw against the Republic of Ireland. In France 1998, Norway was eliminated by Italy in the first round of the knock out stage after finishing second in their group, having drawn against Morocco and Scotland and won 2–1 against Brazil.

The former under-21 coach Nils Johan Semb replaced Olsen after the planned retirement of the latter, but did not manage to achieve the same results as Olsen. He was replaced by Rosenborg coach Åge Hareide at the end of 2003.

Some of Norway's best single results are: Norway–Brazil 2–1 on 23 June 1998 in the World Cup group stage, and Norway–Brazil 4–2 on 30 May 1997. In fact, Norway is the only team in the world who has played Brazil and never lost competitively, winning three matches and drawing on two other occasions.

== Early history ==
Association football came to Norway from Great Britain in the 1880s, and quickly became popular both in terms of active players and as a spectator sport. Norway's first football club, Christiania FC was founded in 1885. The oldest club still in existence is Odd Grenland, formed in 1894. In the following years, several more clubs were formed, and in 1902 the Football Association of Norway was formed. Later that year, the inaugural Norwegian Football Cup was held. However, it wasn't until 1908, at the invitation of the Swedish FA, that a national team was put together.

== The first international match ==
Norway's first-ever international game was played on 12 July 1908 in Gothenburg, Sweden. This was also Sweden's first-ever international match. It was decided that Oslo club Mercantile FK, who were the reigning Norwegian champions, should represent Norway in this match. However, some of the players from the 1907 team were injured or otherwise unable to travel, so a couple of players from other clubs had to be called up as replacements. Nonetheless, nine of the eleven players in Norway's lineup that day were Mercantile players. The two non-Mercantile players in the team were Victor Nysted from Lyn and Frithjof Skonnord from Gjøvik/Lyn.

Another player on the Norway side was Tryggve Gran, who had moved to Oslo from Bergen a couple of months earlier and joined Mercantile. Gran would later become famous as an aviator and polar explorer. The Norway team also included Paul Hauman, a Belgian engineer who was working in Norway at the time. Because he played for Mercantile, and because there were no clear international eligibility rules at the time, Hauman was able to play for Norway in this match despite being a citizen of Belgium. To this day, Hauman remains the only player who has played for the Norway team without holding a Norwegian passport.

The match started well for the Norwegians. Within the first minute, Minotti Bøhn scored the first goal of the game, but then Sweden took over and scored the next five goals before Hans Endrerud reduced the deficit right before half-time. Sweden continued to run rampant in the second half, and Norway's only consolation was a second goal from Bøhn. When the referee blew the final whistle, Sweden had won by a score of 11–3.

A popular anecdote from this match is the story of Tryggve Gran fighting for the flag. At the time of the match, only three years had passed since Norway's independence from Sweden, and there was still bitterness about the dissolution of the union on both sides of the border. Near the end of the match, some Swedish spectators mockingly lowered the Norwegian flag at the stadium to half mast, which Gran took as a great insult. While the match was still being played, he walked off the pitch to the flagpole to raise the flag back to the top.

== 1910s ==
After the heavy defeat against Sweden, it would take two years until the next time a Norwegian national side was put together. Once again, the Swedes were the opposition, and this time it was the Norwegians who held the home-field advantage. It was, however, the Swedes who won the match. This time, the final score was 4–0. Norway also went home with two straight defeats when they participated in the Stockholm Olympics of 1912. The opponents were Denmark and Austria.

Overall, the period between 1908 and 1917 is a sorry chapter in the Norwegian national team's history. In those nine years, Norway failed to win a single game. Rock bottom was reached on 7 October 1917 when Norway were routed 12–0 against Denmark. To this date, this is Norway's heaviest ever defeat.

Near the end of the decade, things began to improve. A new national team coach was hired in 1918. His name was Birger Möller, and he was Swedish. Möller is said to have been an excellent motivator, and spent a lot of time practicing team play and technical skills – and good results followed. On 16 June 1918, after 27 straight games without a win, Norway avenged the embarrassing defeat in Copenhagen the year before by winning 3–1 against Denmark in Oslo to record its first-ever victory. A few months later, Norway defeated arch-rivals Sweden by a score of 5–1 in Gothenburg, which was Norway's first-ever away victory.

== 1920s ==
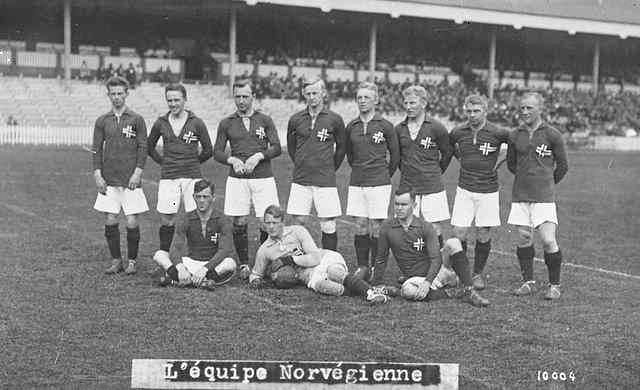
The Norway team at the 1920 Olympics.

Norway's biggest star in the 1920s was unquestionably Einar "Jeja" Gundersen, who scored a total of 26 international goals between 1917 and 1928. Other stars at the time were team captain Gunnar Andersen (Lyn), Per Skou (Lyn and Odd) and Asbjørn Halvorsen (Sarpsborg). These players formed the core of the side that participated in the 1920 Olympics in Antwerp, where Norway got their greatest win to that date.

In the opening match of the Olympic tournament, Norway faced pre-tournament favorites England. It may have been an amateur side, but England was nevertheless the home of football, and the team was expected to ease past Norway. It is said that Gunnar Andersen was the first to show that the English players were not supermen, by dribbling past several players. His confidence passed on to the other Norwegian players, and when the smoke cleared, Norway had won 3–1 courtesy of two goals by "Jeja" Gundersen and one goal by Einar Wilhelms.

In the next round, Norway faced Czechoslovakia, but there was to be no repeat of the sensational win against England. The Czechoslovaks won the game 4–0.

Norway claimed a few more scalps in the following years, including a 2–0 win against France in Paris in 1923, as well as a few more wins against arch-rivals Sweden. However, in the latter half of the 1920s, the golden era was over. Between 1924 and 1928, Norway won only four matches – all of them against Finland.

The bad spell began to end near the turn of the decade, largely thanks to new star players like goalkeeper Henry "Tippen" Johansen and striker Jørgen Juve, who is Norway's all-time leading scorer on international level with 33 goals. On 23 June 1929, Juve scored twice as Norway defeated Denmark by a score of 5–2 in Copenhagen. It was Norway's first-ever away win against Denmark.

== 1930s ==
In 1933, Viking's brilliant inside-forward Reidar Kvammen made his international debut. Two years later, Lyn's wing wizard Arne Brustad made his debut. Furthermore, in 1934, former national team hero Asbjørn Halvorsen returned home after 12 years in Germany. These events mark the start of what is known as Norwegian football's "Bronze Age".

When Halvorsen returned from Germany, he was hired as general secretary of the NFF, and thus also became chairman of the national team's selection committee. At the time, team selection was handled by the selection committee, while the coach's sole responsibility was training the players the selection committee had picked. However, Halvorsen also named himself team coach, and thus became Norway's first "modern" national team manager.

Norway had gotten several good results leading up to the Berlin Olympics, including wins against Austria and Hungary. Even so, few people believed Norway would stand a chance in the Olympic tournament, especially since they were scheduled to face the host nation in the second round (if they could get past Turkey in the opener). The match against Turkey went easier than expected, as Norway won 4–0. The next match was against the Germans, who had demolished Luxembourg 9–0 in their opener. It is said that the Norwegians were so sure of defeat that they had booked return tickets to Norway two days after the Germany game. If this is true, the travel arrangements would have had to be altered.

In front of a capacity crowd that included Hitler and Goebbels, Norway got a fully deserved 2–0 win against the hosts. Both goals were scored by Magnar Isaksen, and the win meant that Germany were knocked out and Norway advanced to the semi-finals, where they faced Italy. The match against Italy was a closely contested one, but the Italians eventually won the game 2–1 after extra time. Arne Brustad scored the Norwegian goal. Next up was the third-place match against Poland, where Brustad scored a hat-trick and guided Norway to a 3–2 victory. Norway had won the bronze medals, and Brustad was hailed as one of the best players of the tournament.

Two years later, Norway took part in their first FIFA World Cup. Norway had qualified after defeating the Republic of Ireland by an aggregate score of 6–5. Reidar Kvammen was the big hero, having scored twice in both matches. The 1938 World Cup was a straight knockout tournament, and in the opening round, Norway were drawn against defending world champions Italy.

The match, which was played in Marseille, was very tight and exciting. Italy took an early lead, but Norway equalised seven minuted before the final whistle, when Brustad ran past the entire Italian defence and slotted the ball past the keeper. A few minutes later, everyone believed that Brustad had added his second, but this goal was disallowed because of a highly disputed offside call. So, just like in the Olympic tournament two years earlier, the game went to extra time – and once again, the Italians came out on top thanks to a goal by Silvio Piola. And just like in the 1936 Olympics, Italy went on to win the entire tournament. There was a small consolation for Brustad later that year, when he was picked in the "Rest of Europe XI" that played against England at Wembley.

On 22 October 1939, Norway lost 4–1 against Denmark in Copenhagen. This would turn out to become Norway's last international match for nearly six years.

== 1940s ==
When Norway was invaded by Germany in 1940, practically all organized football operations were ceased. Asbjørn Halvorsen was among the figureheads of the sports boycott, and was arrested and sent to a concentration camp. Many other sports figures, including Reidar Kvammen, were also put in concentration camps. Although many players tried to keep fit, and a few illegal matches were organized, the six-year hiatus set Norwegian football back by several years – which became painstakingly evident in the first post-war game against Sweden in Stockholm on 21 October 1945.

Many of the old heroes were in the side that faced Sweden that day. Brustad, Øivind Holmsen and Alf "Kaka" Martinsen had played for the "Bronze Team", while Kristian Henriksen, Knut Brynildsen and Rolf Johannessen had played in the 1938 World Cup. However, six years is a long time in football, and the Swedes, who had not been involved in the war, had a great side in the making, and won the game by a score of 10–0. When Sweden scored their ninth goal, team joker Kristian Henriksen reportedly told his teammates, "OK lads, lets go for a draw". The Bronze Age was over.

Eventually, new players were added to the team towards the end of the 1940s. Two of the biggest names were striker Gunnar Thoresen and defender Thorbjørn Svenssen, who was nicknamed "Klippen" ("The Rock"). Also, Bronze Team hero Reidar Kvammen still had some skills remaining in his feet and became the first Norwegian to reach 50 caps in 1948. Although the team was nowhere near the levels of the pre-war side, they did notch up a few big wins. In 1946, Finland were routed by a score of 12–0, and two years later, Norway won 11–0 against the United States in a match where Odd Wang Sørensen scored five goals – which to this day is the team record for most goals scored by one player in a single game.

In 1949, an 18-year-old inside-forward from Ørn-Horten named Per Bredesen made his international debut. He scored in his debut and received rave reviews. Norway had uncovered a new star, and as Norway entered the 1950s, people believed Norway had a new great side in the making. Unfortunately, young Bredesen's national team career was short-lived. In 1952, Bredesen was signed a professional contract with Italian giants Lazio – and according to the NFF's self-imposed amateur rules, he was banished from the national team. In an age where most countries in western Europe had introduced professional football, the old amateur ideals of the 19th century were still the rule in Norway.

== 1950s ==
Victories were few and far between for the Norwegian national side in the 1950s, and the few games Norway actually did manage to win were usually against fellow minnows Finland and Iceland. Norway did manage a sensational 2–1 win against Hungary in a 1958 FIFA World Cup qualifier, but other than that, there were few highlights. In the return game against the Hungarians, Norway were beaten 5–0.

Thorbjørn Svenssen remained a mainstay in Norway's central defence throughout the decade, and when he finally bowed down in 1962, he had played an amazing 104 full internationals. At the time, he was only the second footballer in history to reach a century of caps (the first was England captain Billy Wright). Another national team star at the time was striker Harald Hennum, whose 25 international goals is a post-war record.

Nobody knows what Norway might have achieved if Per Bredesen had been available, but the amateur rules were still in force, even though they were somewhat relaxed in 1960 to allow another Italian exile, Ragnar Larsen, who had recently returned home, to once again play for his country.

In 1959, Norway finished the year with four straight defeats and 22 conceded goals.

== 1960s ==
Following the dismal end to the last year, Austrian Wilhelm Kment was hired as new national team coach in 1960. Another newcomer was a 17-year-old winger from Brann named Roald Jensen, but became known only by his nickname "Kniksen". The slightly built teenager was a wizard with the ball, and suddenly, Norway had a new star – and new-found optimism. Another talented youngster, attacking midfielder Olav Nilsen made his debut a couple of years later. Nilsen would be a mainstay in the side throughout the decade. "Kniksen" on the other hand, went abroad just like Per Bredesen before him, and thus became disqualified from further national team play.

There was little improvement to be found in the results column, but once in a while, Norway pulled off a shock result. They won against Sweden and Holland in 1962, and defeated Scotland by a score of 4–3 in 1963. However, this fine win was followed by a 9–0 defeat against Poland, just to confirm that despite the occasional victory, Norway were still among the bottom-feeders of European football.

In the 1966 FIFA World Cup qualifiers, Norway emerged as serious contenders for qualification for the first time in three decades. Though the home-based amateur only rule was retained, Norway boasted a promising side including Finn Seemann, Harald Berg, Olav Nilsen and Egil Olsen. All told, they finished runners up behind France with 7 points (3 wins, 1 draw and 2 defeats) with two narrow defeats by France proving costly.

One of Norway's most shocking results in the 1960s was the victory against Yugoslavia in a 1966 FIFA World Cup qualifier. The Yugoslavs had finished second in the 1960 European Championship a few years earlier, and was rated as one of the continent's top sides – but they had to travel home from Ullevaal with a 3–0 defeat in their bags thanks to goals from Finn Seemann, Odd Iversen and the new star player from northern Norway, Harald "Dutte" Berg. Norway also played well against France in this qualifying campaign, but both matches ended with narrow defeats. This was nevertheless the closest Norway had come to reaching a major tournament since the glory days of the 1930s.

Norway once again faced France in the qualifying tournament for the 1970 FIFA World Cup. The home match ended with a rather predictable 3–1 defeat, but in the first leg in Strasbourg, Norway had pulled off another shock result and won the game 1–0. Odd Iversen scored the only goal of the game. France never recovered and were eventually eliminated by Sweden.

Among the other notable facts, it might be mentioned that Fredrikstad defender Roar Johansen played 54 consecutive internationals between 1960 and 1967. Not even Thorbjørn Svenssen managed a streak like that. Another piece of trivia was that goalkeeper Kjell Kaspersen scored on a penalty in the 7–0 friendly win against Thailand in 1965. This makes Kaspersen the only goalkeeper to have scored for the Norwegian national side.

== 1970s ==
In 1969, the self-imposed amateur rule was finally abolished, and foreign-based professionals like "Kniksen" and Finn Seemann could once again play with the flag on their chest. It also meant that domestic stars like Odd Iversen and Harald Berg could move abroad without jeopardizing their national team eligibility.

However, the rule change did not improve the results. If anything, the national team's results in the early 1970s got even worse. During the UEFA Euro 1972 qualifying campaign, Norway picked up only one point in six games, and in a 1974 FIFA World Cup qualifier against Holland, Norway lost 9–0. The next year, they suffered a perhaps even more humiliating result by losing against Luxembourg.

There were, however, a few bright spots. A new star emerged in the form of Tom Lund, who made his international debut in 1971. A playmaker in the Johan Cruyff mold, "Tommy" was without question a great player. Many consider him to be the Norway's finest player ever, but even he couldn't carry the team on his own, and Norway continued to finish last in their FIFA World Cup and UEFA European Championship qualifying groups.

In the late 1970s, however, there were signs of improvement. Guided by Tom Lund and new head coach Tor Røste Fossen, Norway defeated both Sweden and Switzerland in the qualifying campaign for the 1978 FIFA World Cup. The win against Sweden was somewhat marred by Svein Grøndalen's vicious tackle on Swedish star player Ralf Edström, but when Norway played their last World Cup qualifier away against Switzerland, they still had a theoretical chance of reaching the finals. However, the game ended with a 1–0 defeat, and Norway once again had to stay home.

In the late 1970s, Norway boasted an Olympic football team alongside its national A-team. Eligibility for participation in the Olympic squad was contingent upon non-professional status. Despite being essentially a B-team, the matches played by the Olympic squad were recognised as official international games in Norway, but weren't recognised as such by FIFA. Notably, in 1979, the Olympic team successfully secured qualification for the 1980 Summer Olympics in Moscow by overcoming Finland and the amateur team of West Germany during the qualification stage. Arne Larsen Økland emerged as a pivotal figure, clinching victory with a decisive goal in the crucial away fixture against the German side. It is noteworthy that Økland transitioned to a professional career in the Bundesliga shortly afterwards. The Olympic side never got the chance to play in the Olympics, because Norway boycotted the games along with the United States and most of the Western European countries as a protest against the Soviet invasion of Afghanistan.

== 1980s ==
The 1980s got off to a promising start for Norway with a victory against Bulgaria. The good run continued with a 6–1 win against Finland (a game where Pål Jacobsen scored four goals) and victory against Switzerland in a World Cup qualifier. Even a 4–0 loss against England at Wembley did not kill the optimism, because after all, England were one of the best teams in the world – at least in the eyes of the Norwegian public.

Narrow defeats against Hungary and Romania in the spring of 1981 ensured that Norway once again failed to reach the World Cup finals, but they still had pride to play for when England entered Ullevaal on 9 September 1981. Norway's previous five encounters against England's full-time pros had all ended with heavy defeats and a combined goal difference of 2–24. Few people believed that trend was about to end that day. The most optimistic pundits hoped for a narrow defeat. In this game, Norway had Tom Lund and the new star Hallvar Thoresen back in the side. Both had missed the match at Wembley the year before.

The match started badly for Norway. England got off to an early lead through Bryan Robson, but Norway clawed their way back into the game, and midway through the first half, Norway got an equaliser from a Tom Lund cross. The goal was awarded to Roger Albertsen, but television replays have later shown that Albertsen did in fact not touch the ball, and Lund's cross went straight into the net. When Hallvar Thoresen added a second shortly before half time, the shock was in the making. Despite a heavy English pressure in the second half, Norway held on, and had achieved (in the eyes of the Norwegian media) their greatest result ever. It was after this game that radio commentator Bjørge Lillelien gave his famous "Your boys took a hell of a beating" routine.

Led by Tom Lund, Norway had a fairly good team in the early 1980s. In 1982, Norway beat Yugoslavia 3–1 in a UEFA Euro 1984 qualifier with goals by Lund, Økland and Åge Hareide. At the halfway mark, Norway looked to have a good chance of reaching the European Championship. However, Tom Lund retired at the end of the 1982 season, and without their playmaker, Norway was once again a mediocrity and gained only one point in the remaining Euro qualifiers, and once again finished last in the group.

The Olympic team was also put back together, this time to qualify for the Los Angeles Olympics. Norway only finished third in the group, behind Poland and the GDR – but when the Eastern Bloc later decided to boycott the 1984 Olympics, Norway were handed the vacant spot. In the finals, Norway gave a pretty good performance. The opening game against Chile finished goalless, and the second game against France finished with a narrow defeat, which meant that the 2–0 victory in the final game against Qatar was to no avail. Norway were knocked out in the group stage. On the bright side, the Olympic team included several players who would become mainstays in the "A" team in the following years, such as Per Egil Ahlsen, Terje Kojedal, Tom Sundby and last but not least goalkeeper Erik Thorstvedt.

The team got a few more scalps in the mid-1980s. In 1985, Norway won 2–1 away against defending world champions Italy, and the next spring, future world champions Argentina were defeated 1–0 at Ullevaal. However, both these matches were friendlies, and in the games that really mattered, Norway were still also-rans. A few weeks after the win against Italy, Norway lost 5–1 at home to Denmark in a World Cup qualifier. In short, Norway in the 1980s was a team that could beat anyone on a given day, but they could also lose against anyone on a given day – and there were a lot more bad days than good days.

== 1990s ==
In October 1990, national team coach Ingvar Stadheim resigned after a bad start to the Euro 92 qualifying campaign. His replacement was U21 coach Egil "Drillo" Olsen, and this coaching change would signal the start of Norway's best period in modern times. Olsen's style of play may not always have been pretty to watch, and got a lot of criticism both at home and abroad, but the style got results.

In terms of individual players, Norway in the early 1990s was probably not the best team in their history. Only defender Rune Bratseth and goalkeeper Erik Thorstvedt were regarded as true stars on the international level. These two formed the backbone of a side that otherwise included youngsters like Øyvind Leonhardsen, Stig Inge Bjørnebye, Lars Bohinen and Erik Mykland.

The first indication that Norway had a great team in the making came in the Euro qualifier against Italy on 5 June 1991, where goals from Bohinen and Tore André Dahlum led the side to a 2–1 win. Earlier that night, the Norwegian U21 side had defeated the Italian youngsters 6–0. Norway failed to reach the European Championship finals, but they remained in contention until the very last game, and finished a respectable third behind Soviet Union and Italy.

Towards the end of the Euro qualifiers, Olsen recalled former youth prodigy Kjetil Rekdal, who had been out of the national team for more than two years after a failed spell in the Bundesliga. As the midfield anchorman, Rekdal would become one of the team's most important players throughout the 1990s.

In the qualifying tournament for the 1994 FIFA World Cup, Norway were drawn in the same group as England, the Netherlands and Poland. Getting to the World Cup from this group was impossible, according to the pundits, but Olsen had other ideas. The qualifying campaign got off to a great start with a 10–0 win against minnows San Marino. This match was followed by a surprising win against the Netherlands, and when Norway managed a draw in the away game against England through Kjetil Rekdal's 35-yard screamer, the Norwegian public were starting to believe that the national team might actually reach the finals.

The road to the World Cup continued in 1993, when Norway won 3–1 against Turkey, followed by a great 2–0 win against England and a somewhat fortunate goalless draw against the Netherlands in Rotterdam. The World Cup tickets were secured on 13 October, when Norway defeated Poland by 3–0 in Poznań after goals by Jostein Flo, Jan Åge Fjørtoft and Ronny Johnsen. A 2–1 defeat by Turkey in their next match meant nothing: Norway had reached the World Cup finals for the first time since 1938. In October 1993, Norway had managed the amazing feat of being ranked the second best team in the world (behind Brazil) on the FIFA World Rankings.

The finals were somewhat of a disappointment for the Norwegian team. The tournament got off to a fine start with a win against Mexico in a match that won't go down in history as a classic. Substitute Kjetil Rekdal scored a late winner. This match was followed by a 0–1, 11–10 men defeat against Italy, and after two games, all four teams in the group had collected three points. This meant that Norway would progress to the next round with a win against the Republic of Ireland. They would also progress with a draw if the match between Italy and Mexico got a winner. The match against Ireland ended in a disappointing goalless draw – and since the Italy v Mexico game also ended with a draw, Norway were knocked out by the slimmest of margins.

Next up was the UEFA Euro 1996 qualifiers. Norway looked like qualifying through most of the campaign, but stumbled in the last two games against the Czech Republic and the Netherlands, and were knocked out. At this point, Bratseth and Thorstvedt had both retired and been replaced with Henning Berg and Frode Grodås respectively. Two other new faces in the qualifying campaign for the 1998 World Cup were young strikers Tore André Flo and Ole Gunnar Solskjær. Solskjær scored twice in the 5–0 win against Azerbaijan, and was later signed by Manchester United F.C. Flo got his breakthrough on the international stage when he scored twice in the 4–2 friendly win against Brazil at Ullevaal. Norway clinched the World Cup spot with a 4–0 win against Finland two rounds before the end of the qualifying campaign.

Just like 60 years earlier, Norway had reached a World Cup played in France. History would repeat itself in more ways. Just like in the last World Cup, Norway were unimpressive in the opening matches. The first two matches against Morocco and Scotland ended with draws, which meant that Norway faced the difficult task of beating Brazil if they were to advance to the second round.

"23 June 1998" and Marseille will always be remembered as the date and venue of one of Norway's greatest victories. Brazil did have most of the attacking play, and when Bebeto gave the Brazilians the lead after 78 minutes, it looked like Norway were heading for another early exit. However, in a few minutes, Tore André Flo got an equalizer, and when he was pulled down in the area two minutes before the final whistle, Norway got a penalty. Kjetil Rekdal fired the penalty into the back of the net. Norway had come from behind to win against Brazil, and advanced to the second round – once again in Marseille, and once again against Italy. The game was also notable for the Flo foul leading to the penalty not being shown on FIFA's official cameras, only for a few days later footage captured by a camera operated by Swedish broadcaster SVT was released showing otherwise.

The match against the Italians was a disappointing performance from the Norwegians. Italy got an early lead through Christian Vieri, and Norway rarely threatened the solid Italian defence – and just like in 1938, Norway were knocked out of the World Cup by Italy. This loss also ended Norway's undefeated run of 17 matches, a record for the team. After the tournament, Egil Olsen stepped down as national team coach and was replaced by his assistant Nils Johan Semb.

== 2000s ==
Semb's style of play was roughly the same as his predecessor's, although new players like Steffen Iversen, John Carew and John Arne Riise were added. After a slow start to the UEFA Euro 2000 qualifying campaign, Norway won their last seven games and reached the European Championship finals for the first time in their history. The finals started well, but ended with disappointment. In the opener, Norway got a deserved win against Spain through Steffen Iversen's goal. In the second match, Norway played poorly and lost 1–0 against Yugoslavia, but Norway would still qualify for the second round if they could win their last group match against Slovenia. A draw would also be good enough if Spain did not defeat Yugoslavia.

In what must be described as an awful match, the game between Norway and Slovenia ended goalless. In the other match, Yugoslavia had a 3–2 lead after 90 minutes, which would be enough for Norway to advance. However, when Spain scored twice in stoppage time to win the game, Norway were knocked out. After the tournament, Semb had to suffer a lot of criticism for his tactics.

A slow start to the 2002 FIFA World Cup qualifiers did not stop the criticism. After five games, Norway had gained only two points, losing twice against Poland, and after a decade of glory, it became clear that Norway would not reach the finals in Korea and Japan. Norway did finish the qualifying campaign with two wins, but it was too little, too late.

Despite the ever-increasing criticism, Semb remained in charge for the UEFA Euro 2004 qualifiers, where Norway eventually finished second behind Denmark, and faced a two-leg playoff against Spain. In the away leg, Norway got a respectable 2–1 defeat, which provided some cautious optimism before the return leg at Ullevaal. However, the return leg was a nightmare for the Norwegians. Spain dominated the game completely and won 3–0. After this match, Semb resigned.

Norway's next national coach became former national team hero Åge Hareide, who was hired in January 2004, having coached Rosenborg BK to the domestic league title the previous season. The team, which was dubbed "New Norway", won their first six games, although it must be said that many of these games were against second-rate opposition. In the 2006 FIFA World Cup qualifying campaign, results have been varying – ranging from an impressive 3–0 win against Slovenia to a disappointing home defeat against Scotland. Norway eventually finished second behind Italy, and played the Czech Republic in a playoff to reach the finals. In the first playoff match the Czech Republic won 1–0 in Oslo. Norway lost the match 0–1 in Prague on 16 November 2005, thus failing to make it to the 2006 FIFA World Cup.

In the UEFA Euro 2008 qualifiers Norway was drawn in a group with Greece, Turkey, Bosnia and Herzegovina, Hungary, Moldova, and Malta.

On 16 August 2006, Norway faced Brazil in a friendly match at Ullevaal Stadium. The game ended 1–1, and Norway remained unbeaten by the Brazilians.

A successful start to the UEFA Euro 2008 qualifiers followed, breaking a run of eight games without victory, as Norway won 4–1 in Hungary, their largest away win in a qualifier since October 2001, after a string of "amateurish mistakes" by the hosts. It was followed by another victory, against Moldova, but after that, Norway scored only one point in the next three qualifying matches. The team improved with two home ground 4–0 wins in a row (against Hungary and Malta). They also showed great shape by beating Argentina 2–1 in a friendly match at Ullevaal. Then they got a 1–0 victory in Moldova before drawing 2–2 with Greece, in a match Norway had the upper hand. Norway then played away to Bosnia and Hercegovina, winning 2–0 without really impressing. This gave Norway a very good chance of qualification if they won their following game against Turkey. However, Norway lost 1–2 after a poor performance, and were eliminated in the final round of qualification, with Turkey securing their place with a victory against Bosnia and Hercegovina.

Norway competed against Netherlands, Scotland, Macedonia and Iceland in Group 9 of the 2010 FIFA World Cup qualifiers in Europe, considered by many to be the weakest of the 9 groups due to Norway's poor play in recent matches. After draws with Iceland, Scotland and Macedonia and two defeats by the Netherlands, Norway managed a surprising offensive outburst during a 4–0 win over Scotland in Oslo.

Following the weak 2008 season, during which Norway did not win a single game, coach Hareide announced his resignation on 8 December 2008. On 14 January 2009, it was announced that former coach Egil Olsen would temporarily replace him. Olsen's comeback game resulted in a 0–1 win against Germany. However, Norway would tie with Macedonia 0–0 on 6 June and suffered a 2–0 defeat against Holland. As it looked all over for Norway to the Norwegian media and fans, Norway defeated Scotland 4–0. Goals from John Arne Riise, 2 of them from Morten Gamst Pedersen, and another from Erik Huseklepp kept their chances alive. However, a 1–1 tie with Iceland slowed down Norway. John Arne Riise scored early in the game, but Eiður Guðjohnsen equalized. Scotland defeated Macedonia 2–0. Now needing the Netherlands to win against Scotland, and needing to beat Macedonia, Norway defeated Macedonia 2–1 with goals from Thorstein Helstad and John Arne Riise early in the match. While at Hampden Park, Eljero Elia scored the winner for the Netherlands to eliminate Scotland and give Norway second. However, due to Norway having the weakest record of all the nine runners-up they failed to qualify for the World Cup play-offs.

== 2010s ==
In November 2009, it was announced that Egil Olsen would manage the national team until the end of UEFA Euro 2012 qualifying. Ståle Solbakken, who managed F.C. Copenhagen, would then take over as manager of the national team. However Ståle Solbakken has since signed with 1. FC Köln, and Olsen continued until the end of 2014 World Cup qualifying. Norway started the UEFA Euro 2012 qualifying campaign brightly, with a 2–1 victory against Iceland at Reykjavík with goals from Brede Hangeland and Mohammed Abdellaoue, followed by a 1–0 win over Portugal four days later. Norway then won 2–1 away at Cyprus, after John Arne Riise scoring the team's fastest qualifying goal in history, and John Carew scoring his first Norway goal in 11 months. They were ahead of Portugal during the qualifying campaign until a 2–0 defeat at Denmark, allowing Portugal to overtake them on goal difference. Norway ultimately missed out on a play-off spot on goal difference, finishing third in the five-team Group H.

Norway were the top seed of their 2014 World Cup qualifying group, but finished a disappointing fourth. Olsen was replaced by Per-Mathias Høgmo after the 2–0 defeat at home to Switzerland, but Norway dropped out of play-off contention after the following match, a 3–0 defeat at Slovenia. Høgmo continued to manage Norway for UEFA Euro 2016 qualifying. They finished third in their qualifying group and entered a two-legged play-off against Hungary, but lost 3–1 on aggregate. Former Sweden and Iceland coach Lars Lagerbäck took charge in the middle of 2018 World Cup qualifying. They were out of play-off contention after a 6–0 defeat at Germany, and finished fourth in their group.

== 2020s ==
For UEFA Euro 2020 qualifying, Norway were drawn in a challenging group, alongside favorites Spain and Sweden. An opening defeat to Spain was followed by a high-scoring 3-3 draw with Sweden, with both teams scoring in stoppage time. However, results deteriorated. The next game was a disappointing 2-2 draw with Romania (where Norway threw away a 2-0 lead with only 13 minutes remaining). Although this was followed by wins over the Faroe Islands and Malta, Norway could only manage a 1-1 draw with Sweden. The next two games, against Spain and Romania, also ended 1-1, with Norway equalizing on both occasions deep inside stoppage time. Subsequent wins over the Faroe Islands and Malta were not sufficient, and Norway finished outside the top two in the group, who qualified automatically. Despite finishing third, Norway advanced to a playoff, owing to their performance in the Nations League, where they had won their group. In the playoffs, Norway were drawn against Serbia in the semi-finals, where despite a late equalizer, subsequently lost in extra time, and resultingly missed out on qualification for Euro 2020.

Norway began their 2022 FIFA World Cup qualification positively, with a convincing win over Gibraltar. However, this was followed up with a heavy 3-0 defeat to group rivals Turkey. Victory over Montenegro followed, and then a creditable 1-1 draw with group favourite the Netherlands. Wins over Latvia and Gibraltar followed, but points were dropped in a subsequent 1-1 draw with Turkey. Although a 2-0 victory over Montenegro revived Norway's campaign, they were held to a frustrating 0-0 draw with Latvia, at a time when three teams in the group (Norway, the Netherlands, and Turkey) were all very close on points. Going into the final round of group games, any one of the three teams could have finished in any of the top 3 spots. Norway needed a win over the Netherlands to be certain of finishing in the top 2 (although if Turkey beat Montenegro, they would likely go through as group winners on goal difference), but a draw would be sufficient to secure second place, as long as Turkey lost to Montenegro (given Turkey's superior goal difference, a draw with Montenegro would probably have seen them finish in second place, above Norway). However, neither result occurred. Norway lost 2-0 to the Netherlands (the game having been scoreless until the 84th minute), while Turkey came from behind to beat Montenegro 2-1. Norway accordingly missed out on qualification for the 2022 World Cup.

For UEFA Euro 2024 qualifying, Norway were drawn in a tricky group, alongside Spain (favourites to win the group) and Scotland (whose recent record of failing to qualify for tournaments was similar to Norway's, except that Scotland had qualified for Euro 2020). Norway began the group in disappointing fashion, first losing 3-0 to Spain, and then drawing 1-1 with Georgia (a problem exacerbated by qualification rivals Scotland unexpectedly beating Spain). Norway then lost to Scotland 2-1, throwing away their lead in the last 3 minutes of the game and conceding both goals. Back to back wins against Cyprus, Georgia and Cyprus again improved matters, but a subsequent defeat to Spain confirmed that Norway could not finish in the top two of the group, and therefore could not qualify, regardless of the result of Norway's final game (against Scotland, which subsequently finished 3-3). Owing to Norway & other teams' performances in the Nations League, Norway also could not reach the play-offs via the Nations League either, and so missed out on Euro 2024.

For the 2026 FIFA World Cup qualification, Norway were drawn into Group I alongside Italy, Israel, Estonia, and Moldova. They began their campaign strongly in March 2025, recording victories over Moldova (5–0) and Estonia (1–0), before defeating Israel 4–2 away in Hungary. In June 2025, Norway achieved a notable 3–0 win against Italy at Ullevaal Stadion, their first victory over the Italians in 25 years. They maintained their momentum with an 11–1 win over Moldova and a 5–0 victory against Israel. Norway later secured first place in the group with a 4–1 away win over Italy at the San Siro in November 2025, finishing their campaign with eight wins from eight matches and sealing direct qualification for the 2026 FIFA World Cup. Norway’s qualification marked their first FIFA World Cup appearance since 1998, ending a 28-year absence. Erling Haaland was the top scorer of the qualifying campaign, with 16 goals in eight matches.
