= List of Norway international footballers =

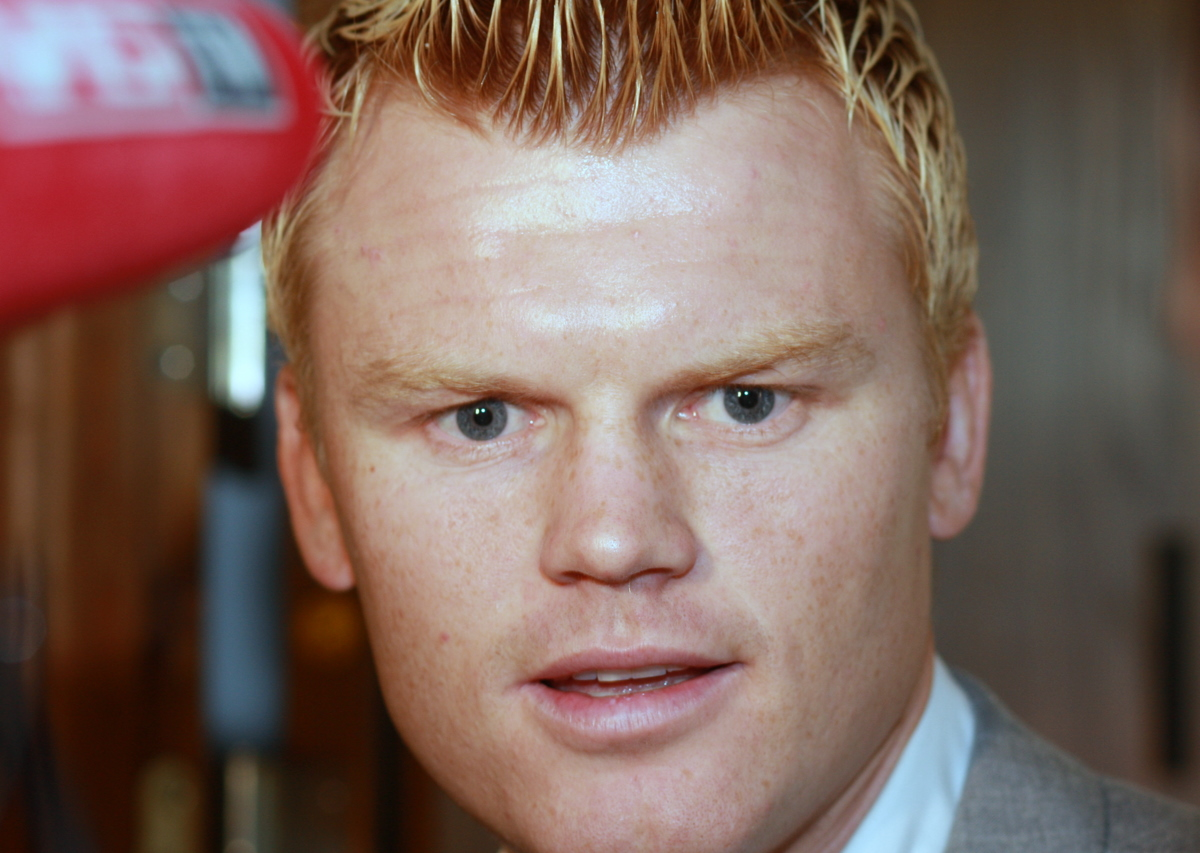
John Arne Riise is Norway's most capped player with 110 caps from 2000 to 2013.

The Norway national football team represents Norway in international association football. It is administered by The Football Association of Norway, NFF, the governing body of football in Norway. The team competes as a member of the Union of European Football Associations (UEFA), which oversees football in Europe. Norway made its debut on 12 July 1908, competing for the first time in a match against Sweden, which resulted in a 3–11 loss.

Norway have competed in numerous competitions, and below is a list of all players who have played 25 or more matches, whether as a member of the starting eleven or as a substitute. Each player's details include his usual playing position while with the team, the number of caps earned, goals scored in all international matches, and details of the first and most recent matches played in. The names are initially ordered by number of caps (in descending order), then by date of debut, and finally by alphabetical order. All statistics are correct up to 12 July 2026.

== Key ==
Player
This colour background and the * symbol indicate that the player was active at club level as at the date specified above.

Positions key
Pre-1960s		1960s–	
GK	Goalkeeper		
FB	Full back	DF	Defender
HB	Half back	MF	Midfielder
FW	Forward		

Position
Playing positions are listed according to the tactical formations that were employed at the time. Thus the change in the names of defensive and midfield positions reflects the tactical evolution that occurred from the 1960s onwards.
Caps and goals
Caps and goals comprise those in the FIFA World Cup and UEFA European Championship, their associated qualification matches and international friendly tournaments and matches.

== Players ==
Norway national team football players with at least 25 caps
No.	Player	Pos.	Caps	Goals	Debut		Last or most recent match		Ref.
No.	Player	Pos.	Caps	Goals	Date	Opponent	Date	Opponent	Ref.
1	John Arne Riise	DF / MF	110	16	31 January 2000	Iceland	22 March 2013	Albania	
2	Thorbjørn Svenssen	DF	104	0	11 June 1947	Poland	16 May 1962	Netherlands	
3	Henning Berg	DF	100	9	13 May 1992	Faroe Islands	27 May 2004	Wales	
4	Erik Thorstvedt	GK	97	0	13 November 1982	Kuwait	27 March 1996	Northern Ireland	
5	John Carew	FW	91	24	18 November 1998	Egypt	11 October 2011	Cyprus	
5	Brede Hangeland	DF	91	4	20 November 2002	Austria	27 May 2014	France	
7	Øyvind Leonhardsen	MF	86	19	31 October 1990	Cameroon	7 June 2003	Denmark	
8	Kjetil Rekdal	MF	83	17	28 May 1987	Italy	27 May 2000	Slovakia	
8	Morten Gamst Pedersen	MF	83	17	18 February 2004	Northern Ireland	9 September 2014	Italy	
10	Steffen Iversen	FW	79	21	14 October 1998	Albania	26 March 2011	Denmark	
11	Erik Mykland	MF	78	2	7 November 1990	Tunisia	11 October 2000	Ukraine	
12	Svein Grøndalen	DF	77	0	25 July 1973	North Korea	26 September 1984	Denmark	
13	Alexander Sørloth *	FW	77	26	29 May 2016	Portugal	12 July 2026	England	
14	Tore André Flo	FW	76	23	11 October 1995	England	18 August 2004	Belgium	
14	Ørjan Nyland *	GK	76	0	19 November 2013	Scotland	12 July 2026	England	
16	Stig Inge Bjørnebye	DF	75	1	31 May 1989	Austria	7 October 2000	Wales	
17	Martin Ødegaard *	MF	73	5	27 August 2014	United Arab Emirates	12 July 2026	England	
18	Rune Jarstein	GK	72	0	22 August 2007	Argentina	30 March 2021	Montenegro	
19	Jan Åge Fjørtoft	FW	71	20	26 February 1986	Grenada	1 September 1996	Georgia	
19	Sander Berge *	MF	71	1	26 March 2017	Northern Ireland	12 July 2026	England	
21	Ole Gunnar Solskjær	FW	67	23	26 November 1995	Jamaica	7 February 2007	Croatia	
22	Terje Kojedal	DF	66	1	12 August 1981	Nigeria	15 November 1989	Scotland	
23	Jahn Ivar "Mini" Jakobsen	MF	64	11	9 August 1988	Bulgaria	16 June 1998	Scotland	
23	Gunnar Thoresen	FW	64	22	16 June 1946	Denmark	28 June 1959	Finland	
23	Gunnar Halle	DF	64	5	14 November 1987	Bulgaria	18 August 1999	Lithuania	
26	André Bergdølmo	DF	63	0	18 January 1997	South Korea	12 November 2005	Czech Republic	
27	Olav Nilsen	MF	62	19	21 June 1962	Sweden	8 August 1971	Sweden	
27	Ronny Johnsen	DF	62	3	8 August 1991	Sweden	22 August 2007	Argentina	
27	Joshua King *	FW	62	20	7 September 2012	Iceland	9 June 2022	Slovenia	
30	Roar Johansen	DF	61	0	28 May 1958	Netherlands	24 September 1967	Denmark	
31	Rune Bratseth	DF	60	4	26 February 1986	Grenada	28 June 1994	Republic of Ireland	
31	Tarik Elyounoussi	FW	60	10	28 May 2008	Uruguay	18 November 2019	Malta	
33	Harry Boye Karlsen	FB / HB	58	4	16 June 1946	Denmark	28 June 1956	Romania	
33	Ståle Solbakken	MF	58	9	9 March 1994	Wales	21 June 2000	Slovenia	
33	Markus Henriksen	MF	58	3	12 October 2010	Croatia	14 October 2020	Northern Ireland	
33	Kristoffer Ajer *	DF	57	2	23 March 2018	Australia	12 July 2026	England	
37	Thomas Myhre	GK	56	0	22 April 1998	Denmark	28 March 2007	Turkey	
38	Gøran Sørloth	FW	55	15	22 May 1985	Sweden	28 June 1994	Republic of Ireland	
38	Stefan Johansen	MF	55	6	14 August 2013	Sweden	8 October 2020	Serbia	
38	Mohamed Elyounoussi *	MF	55	10	18 January 2014	Poland	26 March 2024	Slovakia	
38	Erling Haaland *	FW	55	62	5 September 2019	Malta	12 July 2026	England	
42	Arne Bakker	DF	54	0	19 May 1953	England	11 June 1962	Denmark	
42	Arne Larsen Økland	FW	54	13	29 March 1978	Spain	28 May 1987	Italy	
42	Per Egil Ahlsen	DF / MF	54	3	26 October 1983	Finland	4 February 1992	Bermuda	
42	Christian Grindheim	MF	54	2	17 August 2005	Switzerland	27 August 2014	United Arab Emirates	
46	Jostein Flo	FW	53	11	6 May 1987	Turkey	4 February 2000	Sweden	
47	Asbjørn Hansen	GK	52	0	25 June 1952	Yugoslavia	5 November 1961	Malta	
47	Vidar Riseth	DF / MF	52	4	8 October 1997	Colombia	21 November 2007	Malta	
47	Daniel Braaten	MF	52	4	25 January 2004	Honduras	27 May 2014	France	
47	Håvard Nordtveit	DF / MF	52	2	7 June 2011	Lithuania	12 October 2019	Spain	
51	Reidar Kvammen	FW	51	17	5 November 1933	Germany	19 June 1949	Spain	
52	Åge Hareide	DF / MF	50	5	24 June 1976	Denmark	4 June 1986	Romania	
52	Hallvar Thoresen	MF	50	9	21 May 1978	Republic of Ireland	12 August 1987	Sweden	
52	Frode Grodås	GK	50	0	30 October 1991	Hungary	7 September 2002	Denmark	
55	Lars Bohinen	MF	49	10	25 October 1989	Kuwait	27 March 1999	Greece	
55	Tom Høgli	DF	49	2	20 August 2008	Republic of Ireland	12 November 2015	Hungary	
55	Omar Elabdellaoui	DF	49	0	14 August 2013	Sweden	14 October 2020	Northern Ireland	
55	Patrick Berg *	MF	49	0	24 March 2021	Gibraltar	12 July 2026	England	
59	Henry "Tippen" Johansen	GK	48	0	10 October 1926	Poland	9 November 1938	England	
59	Tor Egil Johansen	MF	48	7	26 May 1971	Iceland	4 June 1980	Denmark	
59	Finn Thorsen	DF	48	0	16 September 1962	Sweden	8 August 1971	Sweden	
62	Nils Eriksen	FB	47	0	6 September 1931	Finland	22 October 1939	Denmark	
62	Tom Lund	FW	47	12	26 May 1971	Iceland	27 October 1982	Bulgaria	
62	Julian Ryerson *	DF	47	1	18 November 2020	Austria	12 July 2026	England	
65	Gunnar Andersen	HB	46	0	17 September 1911	Sweden	14 September 1924	Denmark	
65	Vidar Davidsen	MF	46	5	9 August 1979	Finland	29 October 1986	Soviet Union	
65	Petter Rudi	MF	46	3	26 November 1995	Jamaica	1 March 2006	Senegal	
68	Jørgen Juve	FW	45	33	3 June 1928	Finland	13 June 1937	Denmark	
68	Odd Iversen	FW	45	19	1 June 1967	Finland	12 September 1979	Belgium	
68	Tore Pedersen	DF	45	0	12 September 1990	Soviet Union	5 June 1999	Albania	
71	Harald Hennum	FW	43	25	2 October 1949	Sweden	6 November 1960	Republic of Ireland	
71	Harald Berg	MF	43	12	1 July 1964	Switzerland	6 June 1974	Scotland	
71	Trygve Bornø	MF	43	0	18 September 1966	Sweden	1 November 1972	Netherlands	
71	Martin Andresen	MF	43	3	15 August 2001	Turkey	1 April 2009	Finland	
71	Per Ciljan Skjelbred	MF	43	1	28 March 2007	Turkey	11 November 2016	Czech Republic	
71	Leo Østigård *	DF	43	2	25 March 2022	Slovakia	12 July 2026	England	
77	Sigbjørn Slinning	DF	42	1	3 July 1969	Bermuda	19 May 1976	Iceland	
77	Roar Strand	MF	42	4	5 June 1994	Sweden	15 November 2003	Spain	
79	Per Skou	FB	41	1	17 September 1911	Sweden	16 September 1923	Sweden	
79	Pål Jacobsen	FW	41	13	15 May 1975	Finland	16 October 1985	Denmark	
79	Arne Legernes	MF	41	1	8 May 1955	Hungary	5 November 1961	Malta	
79	Sverre Andersen	GK	41	0	26 August 1956	Finland	9 June 1968	Poland	
83	Arne Pedersen	MF / FW	40	11	10 November 1957	Hungary	19 November 1966	West Germany	
83	Christer Basma	DF	40	0	29 November 1995	Trinidad and Tobago	25 January 2005	Bahrain	
83	Claus Lundekvam	DF	40	2	26 November 1995	Jamaica	7 September 2005	Scotland	
83	Jan Gunnar Solli	MF	40	1	20 August 2003	Scotland	3 September 2010	Iceland	
87	Erik Johansen	FW	39	9	1 July 1961	Soviet Union	13 May 1970	Czechoslovakia	
87	Trond Pedersen	DF	39	0	18 June 1975	Finland	31 October 1981	Hungary	
87	Erik Solér	MF	39	4	22 September 1982	Wales	28 July 1988	Brazil	
87	Tom Sundby	MF	39	6	15 June 1983	Finland	14 September 1988	Scotland	
87	Ruben Yttergård Jenssen *	MF	39	0	29 May 2010	Montenegro	4 September 2016	Germany	
87	Birger Meling *	DF	39	0	5 October 2017	San Marino	15 October 2023	Spain	
87	Harald Sunde	MF	39	5	20 August 1964	Finland	3 November 1973	Luxembourg	
87	Kristian Thorstvedt *	MF	39	4	18 November 2020	Austria	26 June 2026	France	
95	Svein Kvia	MF	38	3	3 July 1969	Bermuda	22 September 1976	Sweden	
95	Anders Giske	DF	38	0	14 November 1979	West Germany	14 June 1989	Yugoslavia	
95	Bent Skammelsrud	MF	38	6	14 November 1987	Bulgaria	2 September 2000	Armenia	
95	Trond Andersen	MF	38	0	20 May 1999	Jamaica	20 April 2005	Estonia	
95	Sigurd Rushfeldt	FW	38	7	5 June 1994	Sweden	21 November 2007	Malta	
95	Thorstein Helstad	FW	38	10	16 August 2000	Finland	17 November 2010	Republic of Ireland	
101	Alexander Olsen	HB	37	1	31 August 1919	Netherlands	25 September 1932	Denmark	
101	Bjørn Spydevold	FB / HB	37	1	26 August 1945	Denmark	19 May 1953	England	
101	Kjetil Osvold	MF	37	3	17 December 1984	Egypt	23 August 1989	Greece	
104	Øivind Holmsen	FB	36	0	8 June 1934	Austria	21 October 1945	Sweden	
104	Karl Petter Løken	FW	36	1	14 November 1987	Bulgaria	15 November 1995	Netherlands	
104	Erik Huseklepp	FW	36	7	19 November 2008	Ukraine	18 January 2014	Poland	
104	Mats Møller Dæhli *	MF	36	2	15 November 2013	Denmark	17 June 2023	Scotland	
104	Stefan Strandberg	DF	36	1	19 November 2013	Scotland	15 October 2023	Spain	
104	Marcus Holmgren Pedersen *	DF	36	1	1 September 2021	Netherlands	12 July 2026	England	
110	Bjørn Borgen	MF	35	6	12 June 1957	Hungary	13 November 1966	Bulgaria	
110	Per Pettersen	DF / MF	35	1	5 November 1967	Sweden	3 November 1973	Luxembourg	
110	Frode Johnsen	FW	35	10	16 August 2000	Finland	15 August 2013	Iceland	
110	Bjørn Helge Riise	MF	35	1	15 November 2006	Serbia	12 January 2013	Zambia	
110	Espen Ruud	DF	35	1	14 November 2009	Switzerland	18 January 2014	Poland	
115	Thorleif Olsen	HB	34	0	26 November 1950	Republic of Ireland	11 September 1955	Denmark	
115	Helge Karlsen	DF	34	0	21 June 1973	Denmark	7 June 1979	Scotland	
115	Kai Erik Herlovsen	DF / MF	34	0	28 April 1982	Finland	2 November 1988	Cyprus	
115	Alf-Inge Haaland	DF	34	0	19 January 1994	Costa Rica	25 April 2001	Bulgaria	r
115	Alexander Tettey	MF	34	3	22 August 2007	Argentina	11 November 2016	Czech Republic	
120	Einar Gundersen	FW	33	26	17 June 1917	Denmark	7 June 1928	Sweden	
120	Kjell Kaspersen	GK	33	1	27 June 1961	Finland	9 June 1971	Bulgaria	
120	Arne Brustad	HB / FW	33	17	31 May 1935	Hungary	16 June 1946	Denmark	
120	Einar Aas	DF	33	3	30 June 1977	Iceland	29 October 1986	Soviet Union	
120	Bjarne Berntsen	DF	33	0	9 August 1978	Finland	27 October 1982	Bulgaria	
120	Svein Fjælberg	MF	33	0	26 September 1979	West Germany	24 September 1986	East Germany	
120	Mohammed Abdellaoue	FW	33	7	20 August 2008	Republic of Ireland	28 March 2015	Croatia	
120	Vegard Forren *	DF	33	1	18 January 2012	Thailand	11 November 2016	Czech Republic	
128	Finn Berstad	FW	32	13	25 May 1921	Finland	3 September 1933	Finland	
128	Roger Nilsen	DF	32	3	31 October 1990	Cameroon	4 February 2000	Sweden	
128	Jan Birkelund	DF	32	0	6 June 1973	Republic of Ireland	25 October 1978	Scotland	
128	Sverre Brandhaug	MF	32	2	3 June 1981	Romania	1 May 1991	Cyprus	
128	Kjetil Wæhler	DF	32	1	17 August 2005	Switzerland	11 June 2013	Macedonia	
128	Alexander Søderlund	FW	32	2	15 January 2012	Denmark	14 November 2017	Slovakia	
128	Ole Selnæs *	MF	32	2	24 March 2016	Estonia	15 November 2019	Faroe Islands	
128	Morten Thorsby *	MF	32	0	11 November 2017	Macedonia	26 June 2026	France	
136	Roald "Kniksen" Jensen	MF	31	5	22 June 1960	Austria	27 October 1971	Hungary	
136	Geir Karlsen	GK	31	0	13 November 1969	Guatemala	30 October 1977	Switzerland	
136	Harry Hestad	MF	31	5	8 May 1969	Mexico	24 June 1976	Denmark	
136	Per Edmund Mordt	DF	31	1	31 July 1984	France	23 August 1989	Greece	
136	Tore Reginiussen	DF	31	4	26 March 2008	Montenegro	8 October 2020	Serbia	
136	Haitam Aleesami *	DF	31	0	10 October 2015	Malta	8 October 2020	Serbia	
142	Erik Hoftun	DF	30	0	25 January 1997	Australia	17 April 2002	Sweden	
142	Jørgen Strand Larsen *	FW	30	6	18 November 2020	Austria	12 July 2026	England	
142	Antonio Nusa *	FW	30	9	7 September 2023	Jordan	12 July 2026	England	
145	Nils Arne Eggen	DF	29	0	14 August 1963	Sweden	13 November 1969	Guatemala	
145	Even Hovland *	DF	29	0	15 January 2012	Sweden	7 September 2020	Northern Ireland	
145	Martin Linnes *	DF / MF	29	1	15 November 2013	Denmark	30 March 2021	Montenegro	
148	Otto Aulie	FB	28	0	26 October 1913	Sweden	2 October 1921	Denmark	
148	Kristian Henriksen	HB	28	0	2 September 1934	Finland	15 September 1946	Sweden	
148	Edgar Falch	FB	28	0	4 July 1954	Iceland	18 October 1959	Sweden	
148	Tore Kordahl	DF	28	0	23 May 1974	East Germany	23 September 1981	Denmark	
148	Stein Thunberg	MF	28	4	6 June 1974	Scotland	29 August 1979	Austria	
148	Erik Hagen	DF	28	3	9 October 2004	Scotland	21 November 2007	Malta	
148	Kristofer Hæstad	MF	28	1	24 May 2005	Costa Rica	17 November 2010	Republic of Ireland	
148	Fredrik Aursnes *	MF	28	1	6 June 2021	Greece	12 July 2026	England	
156	Erik Holmberg	FB	27	0	8 July 1946	Denmark	22 November 1953	West Germany	
156	Gunnar Dybwad	FW	27	11	15 May 1951	England	22 June 1960	Austria	
156	Thor Hernes	HB	27	0	24 June 1953	Saar	26 August 1956	Finland	
156	Thor Spydevold	DF	27	1	18 July 1968	Iceland	1 November 1972	Netherlands	
156	Arild Mathisen	DF	27	0	31 October 1965	Sweden	27 August 1969	Poland	
156	Trygve Andersen	MF	27	1	8 July 1957	Iceland	27 May 1965	Luxembourg	
156	Jørn Andersen	FW	27	5	17 April 1985	East Germany	10 October 1990	Hungary	
156	Eirik Bakke	MF	27	0	20 January 1999	Israel	26 March 2008	Montenegro	
156	David Møller Wolfe *	DF	27	1	16 November 2023	Faroe Islands	12 July 2026	England	
165	Adolph Wold	HB	26	3	3 November 1912	Sweden	21 September 1919	Denmark	
165	Rolf Holmberg	HB	26	0	26 July 1936	Sweden	3 September 1939	Finland	
165	Arne Natland	DF / MF	26	0	19 June 1949	Yugoslavia	6 November 1960	Republic of Ireland	
165	Kjell Kristiansen	FW	26	10	31 August 1952	Finland	13 September 1959	Denmark	
165	Edgar Stakset	DF	26	0	28 August 1960	Finland	1 June 1967	Finland	
165	Tom Rüsz Jacobsen	GK	26	0	24 September 1975	Soviet Union	12 October 1983	Yugoslavia	
165	Frode Olsen	GK	26	0	6 February 1995	Estonia	19 November 2003	Spain	
165	Håvard Flo	FW	26	7	9 October 1996	Hungary	18 February 2004	Northern Ireland	
165	Oscar Bobb *	FW	26	2	12 October 2023	Cyprus	12 July 2026	England	
174	Thaulow Goberg	FB	25	0	16 September 1923	Sweden	27 September 1931	Sweden	
174	Jacob Berner	HB	25	0	30 September 1923	Denmark	2 November 1930	Germany	
174	Arne Børresen	HB	25	1	23 September 1928	Germany	5 September 1937	Finland	
174	Alf Martinsen	FW	25	10	26 July 1936	Sweden	28 July 1946	Luxembourg	
174	Odd Wang Sørensen	FW	25	17	24 July 1947	Iceland	25 May 1955	Republic of Ireland	
174	Per Kristoffersen	FW	25	6	12 June 1957	Hungary	19 November 1966	West Germany	
174	Svein Mathisen	MF / FW	25	2	7 July 1975	Iceland	26 September 1984	Denmark	
174	Roger Albertsen	MF	25	3	8 September 1976	Switzerland	12 September 1984	Switzerland	
174	Ola By Rise	GK	25	0	20 December 1984	Egypt	22 May 1994	England	
174	Dan Eggen	DF	25	2	11 August 1993	Faroe Islands	25 April 2001	Bulgaria	
174	Jon Inge Høiland	DF	25	1	22 January 2004	Sweden	29 May 2010	Montenegro	

== See also ==
- List of Norway international footballers (10–24 caps)
- List of Norway international footballers (2–9 caps)
- List of Norway international footballers with one cap
