= Thomas Foy =

Thomas Foy may refer to:

- Thomas P. Foy (1951–2004), American politician
- Tom Foy (1879–1917), English music hall performer
- Tommy Foy (1910–1985), Irish football player
