= 1917 in Norwegian football =

Football in Norway
Men's football
- NM: Sarpsborg

Results from Norwegian association football in the year 1917.

== Prøveligaen 1916–1917 (Unofficial) ==
League	Champion
East League, Group 1	Odd
East League, Group 2	Fram (Larvik)
West League	Brann
North League	Brage

== Class A of local association leagues ==
League	Champion
Smaalenene	Kvik (Fredrikshald)
Kristiania og omegn	Lyn
Romerike	Lillestrøm
Oplandene	Hamar FL
Vestfold	Drammens BK
Grenland	Odd
Telemark	Snøgg
Sørlandske	Start
Vesterlen	Stavanger IF
Bergen og omegn	Brann
Romsdalske	Aalesund
Trondhjem	Brage
Inn-Trøndelagen	Sverre

== Norwegian Cup ==
=== Final ===
14 October 1917

Sarpsborg	4–1	Brann
Nordlie 34', 44'; Simensen 57'; Halvorsen 59'	Report	Johnsen 50'

Stavanger stadion, Stavanger
Attendance: 4,000
Referee: Arne Wendelborg (Frigg)

== National team ==
17 June 1917 Friendly	Norway	1–2	Denmark	Kristiania, Norway
18:00 (UTC+1); Match 23	Helgesen 80'	Report	Olsen 70'; Wolfhagen 85' (pen.)	Stadium: Frogner stadion Attendance: 12,000; Referee: Ernst Albihn (Sweden)

19 August 1917 Friendly	Sweden	3–3	Norway	Hälsingborg, Sweden
13:30 (UTC+1); Match 24	Ström 15', 47'; Malm 54'	Report	Aas 22'; Gundersen 64', 81'	Stadium: Olympia; Attendance: 4,000; Referee: Hagbard Vestergaard (Denmark)

16 September 1917 Friendly	Norway	0–2	Sweden	Kristiania, Norway
13:00 (UTC+1); Match 25		Report	Ekroth 8'; Gustafsson 77'	Stadium: Frogner stadion Attendance: 12,000; Referee: Hagbard Vestergaard (Denmark)

7 October 1917 Friendly	Denmark	12–0	Norway	Copenhagen, Denmark
13:30 (UTC+1); Match 26	Rohde 5', 28'; Klein 9', 13', 25'; Berth 68'; Nielsen 71', 75', 77', 78', 81'; Olsen 83'	Report		Stadium: Københavns Idrætspark; Attendance: 15,000; Referee: Ernst Albihn (Sweden)
