= 1917 Norwegian Football Cup =

Norgesmesterskapet i fotball for menn 1917

Tournament details
- Country: Norway
- Teams: 32

Final positions
- Champions: Sarpsborg (1st title)
- Runners-up: Brann

Tournament statistics
- Matches played: 31

The 1917 Norwegian Football Cup was the 16th season of the Norwegian annual knockout football tournament. For the first time, the tournament was open for all members of NFF. Sarpsborg won their first title, having beaten Brann in the final. This was the first final that was played on grass.

== First round ==
Team 1	Score	Team 2
Brage	4–3	Sverre
Brodd	6–4	Frem
Drafn	1–0	Larvik Turn
Fram (Larvik)	3–2	Odd
Fredrikstad	2–4	Lyn
Hamar FL	5–1	Lillestrøm
Lierfos	1–8	Frigg
Mercantile	1–2	Drammen
Sarpsborg	5–1	Ready
Start	2–4	Stavanger
Storm	5–2	Skiold
Trygg	4–3	Lyn (Gjøvik)
Urædd	4–1	Kristiania Ballklub
Vidar	0–7	Brann
Ørn	2–6	Kvik (Fredrikshald)
Aalesund	1–0	Rollon

== Second round ==
Team 1	Score	Team 2
26 August 1917
Stavanger	8–0	Brodd
Lyn	3–1	Brage
Kvik (Fredrikshald)	3–0	Hamar
Sarpsborg	3–1	Drafn
Frigg	2–1	Trygg
Aalesund	0–14	Brann
Drammen	3–1	Urædd
Fram (Larvik)	1–3 (a.e.t.)	Storm

== Quarter-finals ==
Team 1	Score	Team 2
23 September 1917
Lyn	2–0	Storm
Stavanger	2–5	Brann
Sarpsborg	4–1	Frigg
Drammen	3–5	Kvik (Fredrikshald)

== Semi-finals ==
Team 1	Score	Team 2
30 September 1917
Sarpsborg	3–1	Kvik (Fredrikshald)
Lyn	0–3	Brann

== Final ==
14 October 1917

Sarpsborg	4–1	Brann
Nordlie 34', 44'; Simensen 57'; Halvorsen 59'	Report	Johnsen 50'

Stavanger stadion, Stavanger
Attendance: 4,000
Referee: Arne Wendelborg (Frigg)

Sarpsborg:
GK	Ingvald Martinsen
DF	Bruun Hansen
DF	Henry Hansen
MF	Petter Pedersen
MF	Asbjørn Halvorsen
MF	Peder Jensen
FW	Einar Andersen
FW	Einar Nordlie
FW	Erling Gustavsen
FW	Alf Simensen
FW	Per Holm

Brann:
GK	Sigurd Wathne
DF	Hjalmar Sunde
DF	Frithjof Tønnesen
MF	Sigurd Bøschen
MF	George Deans
MF	John Johnsen
FW	Alf Berstad
FW	Torkel Trædal
FW	Bjarne Johnsen
FW	Rudolf Olsen
FW	Laurentius Eide

== See also ==
- 1917 in Norwegian football
