= Hans Andersen =

Hans Andersen is the name of:

- Hans Christian Andersen (1805–1875), Danish fairy tale writer
- Hans Henrik Andersen (1937–2012), Danish physicist
- Hans Andersen (speedway rider) (born 1980), Danish speedway rider
- Hans Georg Andersen (1919–1994), Icelandic diplomat
- Hans Niels Andersen (1852–1937), Danish shipping magnate and businessman
- Hans C. Andersen, American chemist from Stanford University, 1976 Guggenheim Fellow
- Hans Andersen (politician) (born 1974), Danish politician
- Hans Andersen (footballer, born 1905) (1905–1969), Norwegian footballer
- Hans Andersen (footballer, born 1925) (1925–1999), Norwegian footballer
- Hans Andersen (footballer, born 1939), Danish footballer
