= Roald Amundsen (disambiguation) =

Roald Amundsen (1872–1928) was a Norwegian explorer of polar regions.

Roald Amundsen may also refer to:

- Roald Amundsen (footballer) (1913–1985), Norwegian football defender
- Roald Amundsen (railcar), former Pullman Company private car
- Roald Amundsen (ship), German steel-ship built on the Elbe River in 1952
- MS Roald Amundsen, Norwegian hybrid powered cruise ship
