= Peter Garland =

Peter Garland may refer to:

- Peter Garland (composer) (born 1952), American composer
- Peter Garland (footballer) (born 1971), English former footballer
- Peter A. Garland (1923–2005), U.S. Representative from Maine
