= Matty Geoghegan =

Republic of Ireland footballer

Personal information
- Full name: Mathew Leo Geoghegan
- Date of birth: 16 July 1906
- Place of birth: Dublin, Ireland
- Date of death: ?

Senior career*
Years	Team	Apps	(Gls)
1929–1930	St Patrick's Athletic		
1930–1937	St James's Gate		

International career
1936–1937	Republic of Ireland	2	(2)
- * Club domestic league appearances and goals

Matthew Geoghegan (16 July 1906 – ?) was a Republic of Ireland international footballer.

Geoghegan was capped twice for the Republic of Ireland at senior level, scoring in both games. He made his debut in a 5–2 friendly victory over Germany on 17 October 1936.
