= Charlie Turner (footballer) =

Irish footballer

Personal information
- Date of birth: 16 December 1911
- Place of birth: Athlone, Ireland
- Height: 5 ft 10 in (1.78 m)

Senior career*
Years	Team	Apps	(Gls)
1933–1935	Leeds United	13	(0)
1935–1938	Southend United	99	
1938–1939	West Ham United	11	(0)

International career
1936–1939	Republic of Ireland	10	(0)
- * Club domestic league appearances and goals

Charles J. Turner (born 30 November 1910, date of death unknown) was an Irish soccer international footballer.

== Biography ==
Turner was a centre half and was capped 10 times for the Republic of Ireland at senior level. Turner was signed by Leeds as a twenty-one-year-old from Stalybridge Celtic in May 1933 but played mainly in the reserves before transferring to Southend United in June 1935. He made 99 league appearances at Southend before leaving for West Ham United during the 1937–38 season.

He only made 11 league appearances for the Hammers before joining Hartlepool United at the beginning of the 1939–40 season. The Second World War intervened, however, before he ever got to play for Hartlepool. After the war, he moved back to Ireland where he was made player-coach of Waterford in the League of Ireland before leaving them to manage Shelbourne in 1946.
