= George McKenzie (Irish footballer) =

Irish footballer

Personal information
- Place of birth: Dublin, Ireland
- Date of death: 2006
- Height: 5 ft 7 in (1.70 m)
- Position: Goalkeeper

Youth career
- Arthurlie Juniors

Senior career*
Years	Team	Apps	(Gls)
1934–1935	Plymouth Argyle	1	(0)
1935–1939	Southend United	120	(0)
1939–????	Hereford United	0	(0)

International career
1937–1939	Republic of Ireland	9	(0)
- * Club domestic league appearances and goals

George McKenzie (died in 2006) was an Irish soccerplayer.

McKenzie was a goalkeeper and was capped 9 times for the Republic of Ireland at senior level.
