= Tom Foy =

English music hall performer and comedian

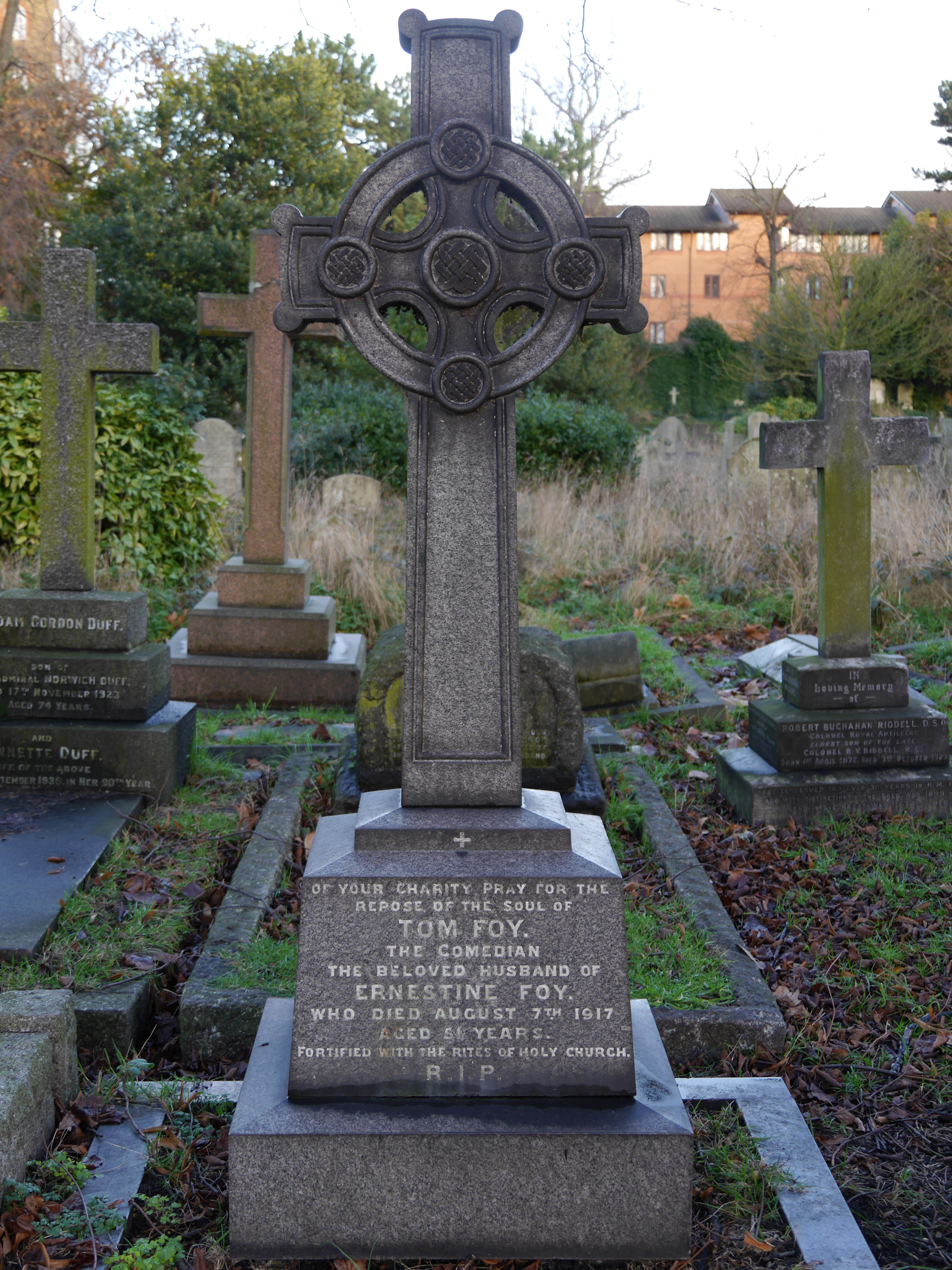
Funerary monument, Brompton Cemetery, London

Thomas Foy (1866 – 7 August 1917) was an English music hall performer and comedian.

He was born in Manchester of Irish parents. Although some sources give his year of birth as 1879, official records (as well as his gravestone) indicate that he was probably born in or around 1866; his age at marriage in 1893 was given as 25.

Prior to his entertainment career he served as an apprenticeship as a sign painter, and set up in business in Halifax, while training as an acrobat in his spare time. He joined a circus as a clown and scene designer, and made his first music hall performance in Manchester as a lightning cartoonist. He developed a song and dance act, and also joined a Wild West show, before becoming a comedian with a stage Irish persona. He appeared in pantomimes in the north of England before heading to London and finding fame as a comedian and pantomime performer.

As a comedian he was famous for his Yorkshire-based sketches such as 'Tom Foy and his Donkey', in later years bringing a live donkey on stage. His first successful sketch was "The Yorkshire Lad in London", which eventually became "The Yorkshireman in London". He was billed as "The famous Little Comedian". As a pantomime performer he specialised in "Idle Jack" and pantomime dames.

On 23 July 1917, whilst onstage at the Argyle Theatre in Birkenhead, he collapsed. He died two weeks later, in Billericay, Essex. He is buried in Brompton Cemetery in London, on the east side of the main central path, not far from the main north entrance.
