= Tor Alsaker-Nøstdahl =

Norwegian footballer (born 1945)

Personal information
- Full name: Tor Ivar Alsaker-Nøstdahl
- Date of birth: 19 February 1945 (age 81)
- Position: Central defender

Youth career
- 1953–1962: Strømsgodset

Senior career*
Years	Team	Apps	(Gls)
1962–1977	Strømsgodset		
1978–1980	Drammens BK		

International career
1963	Norway U19	2	(0)
1966–1967	Norway U21	4	(0)
1966	Norway B	1	(0)
1967–1972	Norway	10	(0)

Managerial career
- Strømsgodset (youth)
- * Club domestic league appearances and goals

Tor Alsaker-Nøstdahl (born 19 February 1945) is a retired Norwegian football defender. Spending his entire career with Strømsgodset, he became league champion in 1970 and cup champion in 1969, 1970 and 1973.

== Career ==
Alsaker-Nøstdahl grew up in Gulskogen and started playing for Strømsgodset as a child in 1953. During his long career in Strømsgodset, the club went from being an unknown local team in Drammen to national champions. The club won promotion from the fourth tier in 1962, the year Alsaker-Nøstdahl made his senior debut, followed by a promotion from the third tier in 1965 and then back-to-back from the second tier in 1966. By 1969, Alsaker-Nøstdahl won his first Norwegian Football Cup title, followed by the double in 1970. From 1968 to 1974, Alsaker-Nøstdahl served as team captain in even years, alternating with Steinar Pettersen who served in odd years.

Following appearances for Norway U19, Norway U21 and Norway B, Alsaker-Nøstdahl made his debut for Norway in 1967. The debut came against Eusébio's Portugal. He won 10 caps, the last in 1972.

Tor Alsaker-Nøstdahl held the club record for number of appearances, jointly with Inge Thun at 329. The record was overtaken by Lars-Christopher Vilsvik in 2020.

In 1978, Alsaker-Nøstdahl and Thun both joined Drammens BK in the fifth tier. Alsaker-Nøstdahl retired after the 1980 season, having helped the club win promotion to the third tier.

He coached youth teams in Strømsgodset. He also sat on the board of the club, being elected as chairman in 1997.

== Personal life ==
After taking the examen artium in 1964, he briefly studied and worked as a teacher, but then spent his professional career with logistics in the Norwegian State Railways from 1967. Norwegian football in his time was not professional, not even the national team.

Alsaker-Nøstdahl married Solbjørg in 1971. They had two boys. One of them, Stian, played for Strømsgodset's first team. Tor's daughter-in-law Christel Alsaker-Nøstdahl has also been a board member of Strømsgodset.
