= Oddmund Andersen =

Norwegian footballer (1915-1999)

Personal information
- Date of birth: 21 December 1915
- Place of birth: Mjøndalen, Norway
- Date of death: 23 November 1999 (aged 83)
- Place of death: Mjøndalen, Norway
- Position: Defender

Senior career*
Years	Team	Apps	(Gls)
- Mjøndalen

International career
1936–1946	Norway	4	(0)
- * Club domestic league appearances and goals

Oddmund Andersen (21 December 1915 – 23 November 1999) was a Norwegian football defender who played as a centre-half and was a reserve member of the Norway squad in the 1938 FIFA World Cup. In total, he won four full caps for Norway between 1936 and 1946. His older brother Hans Andersen was also capped once by Norway.

On club level, Andersen played for Mjøndalen. He was a member of the MIF teams that won the Norwegian Cup in 1934 and 1937.
