= Joe Williams (Irish footballer) =

Irish footballer

Personal information
- Date of birth: 4 November 1907
- Place of birth: Dublin
- Date of death: 18 January 1987 (aged 79)
- Position: Defender

Senior career*
Years	Team	Apps	(Gls)
?–1934	Bray Unknowns		
1934–?	Shamrock Rovers		

International career
1937	Republic of Ireland	1	(0)
- * Club domestic league appearances and goals

Joseph Williams (4 November 1907 – 18 January 1987) was an Irish footballer.

== Career ==
A fullback, he joined Shamrock Rovers in 1934 from Bray Unknowns F.C. where he had played since 1929. During his time at Glenmalure Park he made the centre-half position his own.

Williams won one international cap for the Republic of Ireland national football team against Norway in a World Cup qualifier at the Ullevaal Stadion on 10 of October 1937.

Williams had a benefit game at Dalymount Park on 10 April 1940.

In March 1957, Williams was flown to the US to take part in a This Is Your Life special for Maureen O'Hara, as Williams was her favourite Rovers player. He presented her with an autographed soccer ball from the team.

== International ==
Appearances and goals by national team and year
National team	Year	Apps	Goals
Republic of Ireland	1937	1	0
Total		1	0

== Sources ==
- Paul Doolan; Robert Goggins. The Hoops. ISBN 0-7171-2121-6.
