= Tom Arrigan =

Irish footballer

Personal information
- Full name: Thomas Arrigan
- Date of birth: 28 January 1906
- Place of birth: Waterford, Ireland
- Position: Defender

Senior career*
Years	Team	Apps	(Gls)
1930–32	Waterford F.C.		
1932–33	Cork Bohemians F.C.		
1933–35	Glentoran		
1935–38	Waterford F.C.		
1939–40	Sligo Rovers		

International career
1937	Republic of Ireland	1	(0)
- * Club domestic league appearances and goals

Tom Arrigan (born 28 January 1906) was an Irish association football player who was captain of Waterford F.C. in his hometown.

He won his one and only senior cap for the Republic of Ireland on 7 November 1937, in a 3–3 draw with Norway at Dalymount Park. According to the Waterford Standard, he twice represented Ireland, so possibly had a junior cap.

Arrigan first came to attention playing at Ballinaneesagh, Waterford in 1925–1926, and played for the predecessor to the Waterford F.C., the Waterford Celtic, in the late 1920s.

Arrigan played for Glentoran in Belfast from 1933 to 1935. In 1934, he scored one and assisted in another to help Glentoran defeat Belfast Celtic 3–1 in the Gold Cup semi-final to put Glentoran in the final, where they lost 1–0 to Portadown. He helped the Glentoran take the Irish Cup with the team in 1935. In July 1935, he returned to his home city team, and was captain of the first Waterford United team to lift the FAI Cup in the 1936–37 season.

In early June 1938, it was announced he had not been re-signed but only offered match terms for the next season. The controversial decision was discussed during the annual meeting of the Waterford team management — "the most lively and heated in the history of the local club" — that lasted four hours. There was anger over Arrigan not being re-signed, in addition to the chairman refusing to be transparent about the terms offered to Tim O'Keeffe. (Note: From the Waterford Standard's coverage of the meeting: "In reply to Mr. Byrne, the Chairman said that O'Keeffe had been signed on the same conditions as previously—£4 per week, and no signing fee. Mr. Byrne—Did O'Keeffe get £10 or £20 signing fee last year? Chairman—I am not going to answer that question. Mr. Byrne—We were told last year that O'Keeffe got £10, and he actually got £20. Chairman—You were told no such thing. Hon. Treasurer—l was at the Management Committee meeting, and I disclosed that O'Keeffe got £20.") Mr. Byrne stated, "it is a sad reflection on Waterfordmen here to think that they would stand for that sort of thing; that the best player this town has ever produced should be treated like Arrigan has been treated."

However, later that month he was resigned after negotiation, and he was unanimously chosen as team captain again in August 1938: "His re-election will a popular one for his experience, tact, and courtesy make him eminently suited for the duties which the role of generally involves."

Arrigan remained in his hometown and began working as a referee before joining the Sligo Rovers in 1939, and then continued as a referee for some years.

Arrigan may have experienced financial difficulties after his retirement, as the F.A.I. sanctioned a benefit match for him in 1941 at Kilcohan Park, which included six Waterford F.C. players, and the Tom Arrigan XI, which included Arrigan and amateur players. More than 500 people attended, raising £25 (equivalent to £1,000 in 2025). The Waterford Standard promoted the match as follows: "Tom's achievements in the realms of Association Football are too well known and too numerous to be recounted here, but it only truth to say that he has upheld the honour of his native city through his exploits in the game during his successful sporting career. The Committee of the Waterford and North Munster League, through whose efforts the game being played, deserve the commendation of Tom's admirers and of every lover of the soccer code in Waterford, and it is to be hoped that when the game is being played the public will show their appreciation and esteem of Tom in a practical way by attending in huge numbers."

In 1946, it was reported he was in England.

== Honours ==
Waterford F.C.

- FAI Cup: 1938
