= Frithjof Ulleberg =

Norwegian footballer (1911-1993)

Personal information
- Full name: Frithjof Melchior Blumer Ulleberg
- Date of birth: 10 September 1911
- Place of birth: Norway
- Date of death: 31 January 1993 (aged 81)
- Position: Midfielder

International career
Years	Team	Apps	(Gls)
- Norway

Olympic medal record

Men's Football
Bronze medal – third place	1936 Berlin	Team competition

Frithjof Melchior Blumer Ulleberg (10 September 1911 – 31 January 1993) was a Norwegian football (soccer) player who competed in the 1936 Summer Olympics. He was a member of the Norwegian team, which won the bronze medal in the football tournament.

He also took part in the 1938 FIFA World Cup.
