= Anker Kihle =

Norwegian footballer (1917-2000)

Personal information
- Date of birth: 19 April 1917
- Place of birth: Skien, Norway
- Date of death: 1 February 2000 (aged 82)
- Place of death: Skien, Norway
- Position: Goalkeeper

Senior career*
Years	Team	Apps	(Gls)
- Storm

International career
1939	Norway	2	(0)
- * Club domestic league appearances and goals

Anker Kihle (19 April 1917 – 1 February 2000) was a Norwegian football goalkeeper who played for Norway in the 1938 FIFA World Cup. He was capped twice. He also played for Storm.
