= Tom Blohm =

Norwegian footballer (1920-2000)

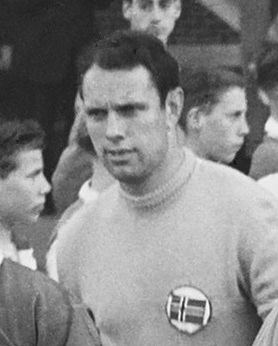

Personal information
- Full name: Tom Villiam Blohm
- Date of birth: 29 June 1920
- Place of birth: Kristiania, Norway
- Date of death: 30 December 2000 (aged 80)

Senior career*
Years	Team	Apps	(Gls)
- SFK Lyn

International career
1937–1952	Norway	20	(0)
- * Club domestic league appearances and goals

Tom Villiam Blohm (29 June 1920 – 30 December 2000) was a Norwegian football player.

== Life and career ==
Blohm was born in Kristiania on 29 June 2020, and played for the sports clubs Hugin, Frigg, and SFK Lyn. He played for the Norwegian national team at the 1952 Summer Olympics in Helsinki. He was capped 20 times for Norway between 1939 and 1952.

Blohm died on 30 December 2000, at the age of 80.
