= Tommy Foy =

Irish footballer

Thomas Jerome Foy (28 October 1910 - 27 October 1985) was an Irish footballer.

He played for Shamrock Rovers in the 1930s and in his time at Glenmalure Park scored a total of 29 league goals.

He won three caps for Ireland making his debut on the 7 November 1937, in a 3–3 draw against Norway in a World Cup qualifier at Dalymount Park. His second cap came in a friendly against Hungary on the 19 March 1939, at the Mardyke.

== Sources ==
- Paul Doolan; Robert Goggins. The Hoops. ISBN 0-7171-2121-6.
