= Hans Andersen (footballer, born 1905) =

Norwegian footballer (1905-1969)

Personal information
- Date of birth: 16 October 1905
- Place of birth: Mjøndalen, Norway
- Date of death: 31 March 1969 (aged 63)
- Position: Defender

International career
Years	Team	Apps	(Gls)
1937	Norway	1	(0)

Hans Andersen (16 October 1905 – 31 March 1969) was a Norwegian footballer. He played one match for the Norway national football team in 1937.
