= Per Holm =

Norwegian footballer (1899-1974)

Personal information
- Date of birth: 10 January 1899
- Place of birth: Sarpsborg
- Date of death: 8 September 1974 (aged 75)
- Place of death: Tune

Senior career*
Years	Team	Apps	(Gls)
- Sarpsborg FK

International career
1918–1926	Norway	17	(1)
- * Club domestic league appearances and goals

Per Holm (10 January 1899 – 8 September 1974) was a Norwegian football player for the club Sarpsborg FK, and military officer. He was born in Sarpsborg. He played with the Norwegian national team at the Antwerp Olympics in 1920, where the Norwegian team reached the quarter finals. He was capped 17 times for Norway, scoring one goal.

Being an aviator lieutenant in the Royal Norwegian Navy Air Service, he was held as a prisoner-of-war during World War II. He was first held at Grini detention camp, then in Schokken, Grune bei Lissa and Ostrzeszów in Nazi German-occupied Poland, from 1942 until the war ended.

He died in Tune in 1974.
