= Roald Amundsen (footballer) =

Norwegian footballer (1913-1985)

Personal information
- Date of birth: 18 September 1913
- Place of birth: Mjøndalen, Norway
- Date of death: 29 March 1985 (aged 71)
- Place of death: Hokksund, Norway
- Position: Defender

Senior career*
Years	Team	Apps	(Gls)
- Mjøndalen

International career
- Norway B
- * Club domestic league appearances and goals

Roald Amundsen (18 September 1913 – 29 March 1985) was a Norwegian football defender who was a member of the Norway team at the 1938 FIFA World Cup. Amundsen was a reserve member of the squad, and never actually played any full internationals for Norway. He was, however, capped twice as a "B" international.

At club level, Amundsen played for Mjøndalen, and was a member if the MIF side that won the Norwegian Cup in 1937.
