= John Johnsen (footballer) =

Norwegian footballer (1895-1969)

Personal information
- Date of birth: 17 March 1895
- Place of birth: Bergen, Norway
- Date of death: 2 February 1969 (aged 73)
- Place of death: Bergen

Senior career*
| Years | Team | Apps | (Gls) |
- Brann

International career
| 1920–1922 | Norway | 9 | (0) |
- * Club domestic league appearances and goals

John Johnsen (17 March 1895 – 2 February 1969) was a Norwegian football player for the club SK Brann. He was born in Bergen. He played with the Norwegian national team at the Antwerp Olympics in 1920, where the Norwegian team reached the quarter-finals. He was capped nine times for Norway. He died in Bergen in 1969.
