= Erik Thorstvedt =

Norwegian footballer (born 1962)

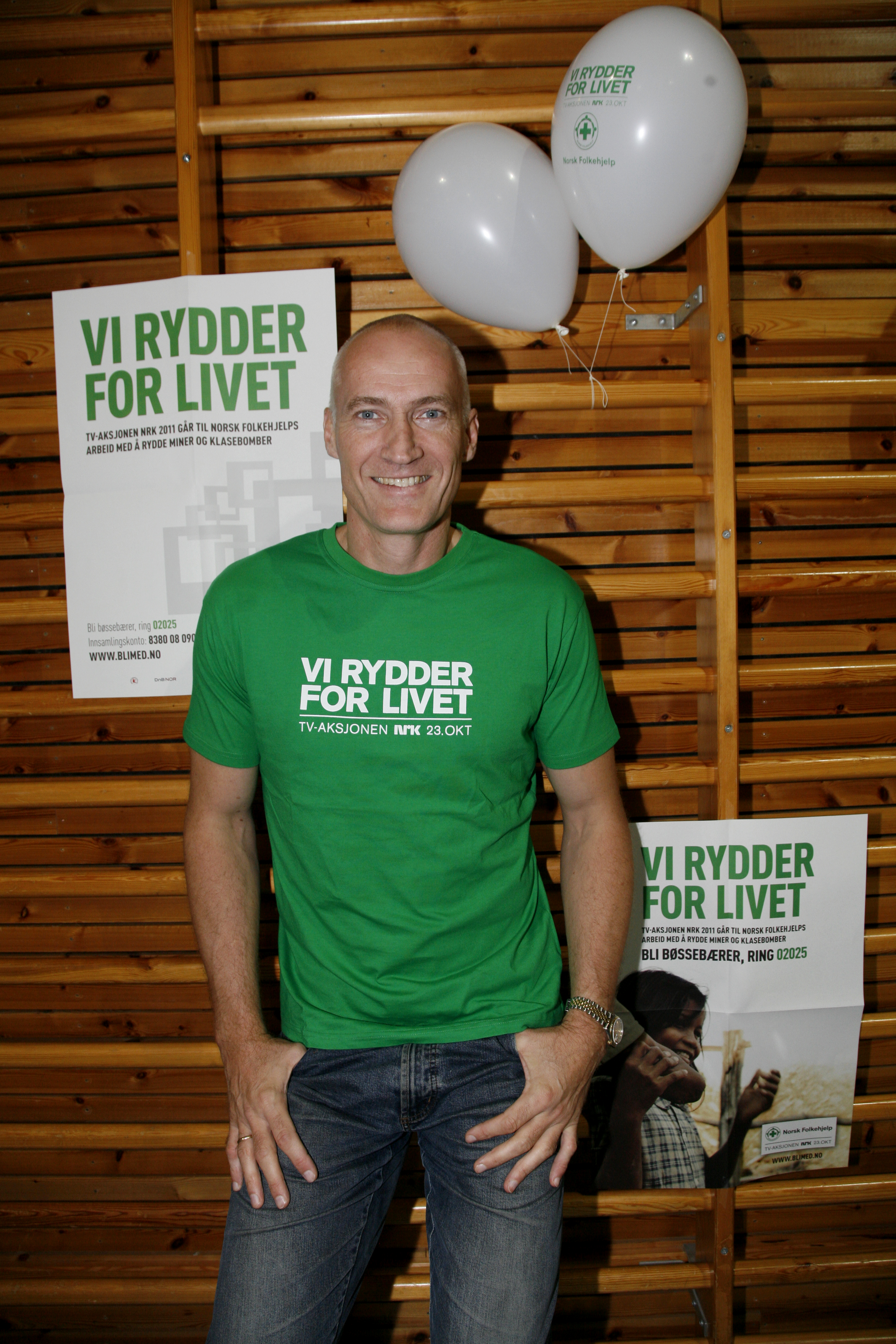
- Thorstvedt in 2011

Personal information
- Full name: Erik Thorstvedt
- Date of birth: 28 October 1962 (age 63)
- Place of birth: Stavanger, Norway
- Height: 1.93 m (6 ft 4 in)
- Position: Goalkeeper

Youth career
- Madla IL

Senior career*
Years	Team	Apps	(Gls)
1980–1981	Viking	0	(0)
1981–1983	Eik-Tønsberg	44	(0)
1983–1985	Viking	38	(0)
1985–1987	Borussia Mönchengladbach	12	(0)
1987–1988	IFK Göteborg	22	(2)
1988–1996	Tottenham Hotspur	173	(0)
Total		289	(2)

International career
1982	Norway U21	5	(0)
1982–1996	Norway	97	(0)
- * Club domestic league appearances and goals

Erik Thorstvedt (born 28 October 1962) is a Norwegian former professional footballer who played as a goalkeeper. He won 97 caps for the Norway national team, and was the starter in goal at the 1994 FIFA World Cup. He played for Viking, Eik-Tønsberg, Borussia Mönchengladbach, IFK Göteborg and Tottenham Hotspur.

== Career ==
Thorstvedt was the first Norwegian to win the FA Cup when he won it with Tottenham Hotspur in 1991 and later became the second Norwegian to play in the Premier League. During his time at Spurs, Thorstvedt lived in the Hertfordshire town of Hoddesdon.

Thorstvedt retired in 1996 due to back injuries. After his career as a player, he worked as a goalkeeping coach with the Norway national team, and had a brief spell as Director of Football at Viking.

He has worked as an expert commentator/pundit for various TV channels, and was the TV-host on the Royal League matches shown on TVNorge. He was also the coach of Tufte IL, a team created for the reality-TV show Heia Tufte!. For his appearance in this show he was awarded the Se og Hør readers' TV personality of the year award. He had a weekly football show on Mondays called "Matchball Mandag" on TV2 where he and guests looked at games played in the Norwegian top division with a humorous approach.

== Personal life ==
He is the father of Norwegian model and former MTV presenter Charlotte Thorstvedt and Sassuolo midfielder Kristian Thorstvedt.

== Honours ==
Tottenham Hotspur

- FA Cup: 1990–91
- FA Charity Shield: 1991 (shared)
