= Rolf Holmberg =

Norwegian footballer (1914-1979)

Personal information
- Full name: Rolf Holmberg
- Date of birth: 24 August 1914
- Place of birth: Norway
- Date of death: 5 July 1979 (aged 64)
- Position: Midfielder

International career
Years	Team	Apps	(Gls)
- Norway

Olympic medal record

Men's Football
Bronze medal – third place	1936 Berlin	Team competition

Rolf Holmberg (24 August 1914 – 5 July 1979) was a Norwegian association football player who competed in the 1936 Summer Olympics. He was a member of the Norwegian team, which won the bronze medal in the football tournament.

He also took part in the 1938 FIFA World Cup.
