= Nils Eriksen =

Norwegian footballer (1911-1975)

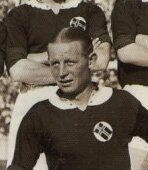
- Eriksen with Norway in 1936

Personal information
- Full name: Nils Kristian Eriksen
- Date of birth: 5 March 1911
- Place of birth: Skien, Norway
- Date of death: 5 May 1975 (aged 64)
- Place of death: Moss, Norway

Senior career*
Years	Team	Apps	(Gls)
1930–1939	Odd		
1939–1949	Moss FK		

International career
1931–1939	Norway	47	(0)
Medal record
Men's Football
Bronze medal – third place	1936 Berlin	Team
- * Club domestic league appearances and goals

Nils Kristian "Påsan" Eriksen (5 March 1911 – 5 May 1975) was a Norwegian association football player.

At the 1936 Summer Olympics he was a member of the Norwegian team which won the bronze medal in the football tournament. He also took part in the 1938 FIFA World Cup. He was capped 47 times.

At club level most of his career was spent at Odd, but he rounded off his career at Moss FK. He coached Moss FK.
