= Sverre Nordby =

Norwegian footballer (1910-1978)

Personal information
- Date of birth: 13 March 1910
- Date of death: 4 December 1978 (aged 68)
- Position: Goalkeeper

Senior career*
Years	Team	Apps	(Gls)
- Mjøndalen

International career
- Norway
- * Club domestic league appearances and goals

Sverre Nordby (13 March 1910 – 4 December 1978) was a Norwegian football goalkeeper who played for Norway in the 1938 FIFA World Cup. He also played for Mjøndalen.

== Record at FIFA Tournaments ==
National team	Year	Apps	Goals
Norway	1938	1	0
