= Odd Frantzen =

Norwegian footballer (1913-1977)

Personal information
- Date of birth: 20 January 1913
- Place of birth: Bergen, Norway
- Date of death: 2 October 1977 (aged 64)
- Place of death: Bergen, Norway
- Position: Outside right

Senior career*
Years	Team	Apps	(Gls)
- SK Hardy

International career
1936–1939	Norway	20	(5)
Medal record
Men's Football
Bronze medal – third place	1936 Berlin	Team
- * Club domestic league appearances and goals

Odd Frantzen (20 January 1913 – 2 October 1977) was a Norwegian football outside right player from Bergen who played for SK Hardy. He was capped 20 times for Norway, and scored five international goals. He was a member of Norway's 1936 Summer Olympics bronze medal team, beating Germany 2-0 in the quarter-finals, and played in the 1938 World Cup. Norway their first match to Italy in the round 16 (2-1), and Italy would go on to win the cup.

Frantzen was kicked to death by an intruder to his home on 2 October 1977. A 25-year-old man was convicted of manslaughter for the incident, with a 24-year old female accomplice (they received 5 and 1 years prison time, respectively). The goal of the intrusion was to acquire alcohol.

Frantzen married Betty Blindheim on 26 July 1941; they separated in 1965. Frantzen had at least two granddaughters, Joy Frantzen and Linn Therese Solend Otterbu .
