= Rolf Johannessen =

Norwegian footballer (1910-1965)

Personal information
- Date of birth: 15 March 1910
- Place of birth: Fredrikstad, Norway
- Date of death: 2 February 1965 (aged 54)
- Position: Defender

Senior career*
Years	Team	Apps	(Gls)
- Lisleby
1934–	Fredrikstad		

International career
	Norway	20	(0)
- * Club domestic league appearances and goals

Rolf Johannessen (15 March 1910 – 2 February 1965) was a Norwegian football defender.

== Career ==
He played for Norway in the 1938 FIFA World Cup. He was capped 20 times for Norway.

At club level, he played for Lisleby, then Fredrikstad from 1934. He also played football while taking education in Saarland, and became Saar champion. In Norway he won two league titles and four cup titles.

After retiring he chaired Fredrikstad FK from 1950 to 1953 and 1960 to 1962. He was an honorary member of the club. He died in February 1965 at Fredrikstad Hospital.

=== Fifa World Cup career ===
National team	Year	Apps	Goals	Assists
Norway	1938	3	0	0
