= Kristian Henriksen =

Norwegian footballer (1911-2004)

Personal information
- Date of birth: 3 March 1911
- Date of death: 8 February 2004 (aged 92)
- Position: Wing half

Senior career*
| Years | Team | Apps | (Gls) |
| 1931–36 | Sarpsborg | | |
| 1936–37 | Frigg | | |
| 1938–46 | Lyn | | |

International career
| 1934–1946 | Norway | 28 | (?) |

Managerial career
- 1942: Brage
- 1947–48: Vålerenga
- 1957–58: Vålerenga
- 1959: Norway
- * Club domestic league appearances and goals

Kristian "Svarten" Henriksen (3 March 1911 – 8 February 2004) was a Norwegian footballer and coach. As a player, Henriksen was a wing half who played for Sarpsborg, Lyn and Frigg. With Lyn, he won the 1945 and the 1946 Norwegian Football Cup. He also played 28 times for the Norwegian national team.

At national team level, Henriksen was a member of the 1936 Olympic squad that went on to win the bronze medals. However, Henriksen was a reserve, and did not play in the tournament. Two years later, in the 1938 World Cup, he did play and was a member of the team that narrowly lost to eventual world champions Italy after extra time.

Henriksen was known as the team joker. When Norway lost 10–0 against Sweden in 1945, he is reported to have said, "Let's go for a draw, lads" after Sweden had scored their ninth goal.

Henriksen managed Vålerenga for two periods; once from 1947 to 1948, and the second time from 1957 to 1958.

Henriksen had a short and largely unsuccessful spell as national team coach in 1958 and 1959. Before his death in 2004, he was the last surviving member of the "Bronze Team" and the 1938 World Cup squad.
