= Øivind Holmsen =

Norwegian footballer (1912-1996)

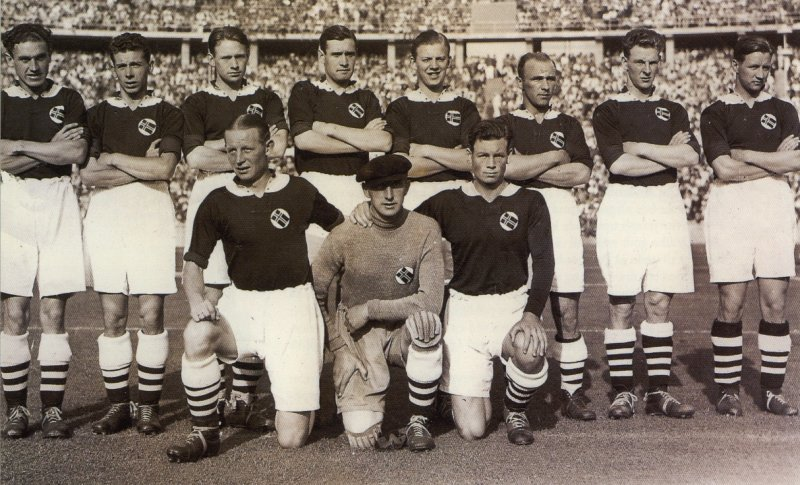

Personal information
- Date of birth: 28 April 1912
- Place of birth: Norway
- Date of death: 23 August 1996 (aged 84)
- Position: Defender

International career
Years	Team	Apps	(Gls)
- Norway

Olympic medal record

Men's Football
Bronze medal – third place	1936 Berlin	Team

Øivind Josef Holmsen (28 April 1912 – 23 August 1996) was a Norwegian international footballer. He played left back for Lyn and the 1936 Olympic bronze team. He also played in the 1938 FIFA World Cup, and got 36 caps in total.
