= Asbjørn Halvorsen =

Norwegian footballer (1898–1955)

Personal information
- Date of birth: 3 December 1898
- Place of birth: Sarpsborg, Norway
- Date of death: 16 January 1955 (aged 56)
- Place of death: Narvik, Norway

Senior career*
Years	Team	Apps	(Gls)
1917–1921	Sarpsborg FK		
1921–1933	Hamburger SV		

International career
1918–1923	Norway	19	(0)

Managerial career
- 1933: Hamburger SV
- 1935–1940: Norway
- * Club domestic league appearances and goals

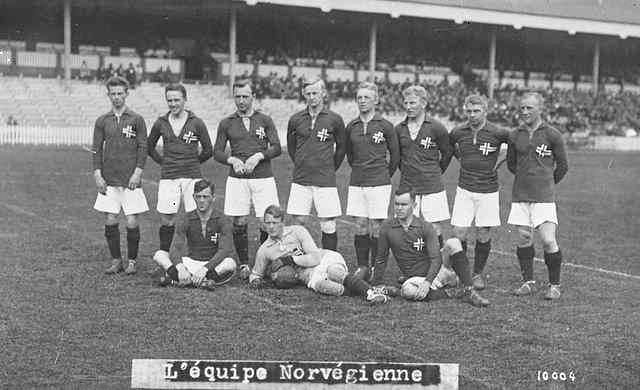

Asbjørn Halvorsen (3 December 1898 – 16 January 1955), nicknamed Assi, was a Norwegian footballer, who played as a centre-half for Sarpsborg FK and Hamburger SV. He was capped 19 times playing for Norway, and was a part of the Norwegian team who competed in the 1920 Summer Olympics. He was later Secretary general of the Norwegian Football Association, and acted as head coach of the Norwegian national team. He is regarded as the architect behind the Norwegian "Bronze Team" that finished third in the 1936 Olympics.

During World War II Halvorsen fought against the occupation of Norway by Nazi troops as a member of the resistance before being sent to concentration camps.

== Personal life ==
Halvorsen was born in Sarpsborg, the son of baker Christian Halvorsen and Jakobine Dorthea Thronsen. He established himself as a ship broker in Hamburg, and his first marriage was with a German citizen. He married for a second time in 1951 with Sigrid Helga Willadsen.

== Playing career ==
Halvorsen was a centre-half who played 19 times for the Norwegian national team, and won the Norwegian Cup in 1917 as captain of Sarpsborg FK. Aged 18 years and 318 days, he is the youngest captain in a Norwegian Cup final. He made his debut for the national team in 1918, in a match against Sweden, and played four matches for the national team in 1918, and four matches in 1919. He represented Norway at the 1920 Summer Olympics in Antwerp, where the Norwegian team reached the quarter-finals. Between 1921 and 1933, Halvorsen played in Germany for Hamburger SV, where he won the German championships in 1923 and 1928. He played his last match for the national team against Germany in Hamburg in 1923, his nineteenth game for the national selection.

== Manager career ==
He returned to his home country in 1933, and was hired as secretary of the Norwegian Football Association, NFF. This job also made him head of the national team's selection committee, and in the years before World War II, he also acted as national team coach.

With Halvorsen at the helm, Norway won the bronze medals at the 1936 Olympics, and qualified for the 1938 World Cup. This was Norway's first and only appearance in the World Cup finals until the 1990s.

== World War II ==
During the war, Halvorsen was one of the figureheads of the Norwegian sports boycott. Practically all organized sport ceased its operations during the German occupation, and as a result, Halvorsen was arrested and placed in a concentration camp. He was imprisoned at Møllergata 19 for one day, then in Grini concentration camp from August 1942 to July 1943, then in Natzweiler-Struthof, Neckarelz and Vaihingen an der Enz concentration camps.

== Post war ==
After the war, Halvorsen continued working for the NFF, with the title of Secretary General, until his death in 1955. He was a board member of Norsk Tipping from 1946, and was decorated Knight of the Swedish Order of Vasa. He died in Narvik in 1955, as his health was permanently weakened by the typhus which he caught at concentration camps.

Sporting positions
Preceded by	Secretary general of the Norwegian Football Association; 1935–1955	Succeeded by Nicolai Johansen
