= Norway national football team results (1930–1959) =

- Win Draw Loss

This is a list of the Norway national football team results from 1930 to 1959.

== 1930s ==
Win Draw Loss

=== 1930 ===
1 June 1929–32 Nordic Championship	Norway	6–2	Finland	Aker, Norway
13:00 (UTC+1); Match 81	H. Pettersen 12'; Juve 17', 42', 66'; M. Pettersen 30', 88'	Report	Saario 66'; Åström 82'	Stadium: Ullevaal Stadion; Attendance: 13,000; Referee: Otto Remke (Denmark)

19 June Friendly	Norway	3–0	Switzerland	Aker, Norway
19:30 (UTC+1); Match 82	Juve 5', 81'; Krupp 88'	Report		Stadium: Ullevaal Stadion; Attendance: 17,000; Referee: Alfred Birlem (Germany)

6 July 1929–32 Nordic Championship	Sweden	6–3	Norway	Stockholm, Sweden
14:00 (UTC+1); Match 83	Lundahl 5', 13', 48'; Kroon 29', 56'; Dahl 44'	Report	Juve 16', 42', 47'	Stadium: Olympic Stadium; Attendance: 18,000; Referee: Jan De Wolf (Netherlands)

21 September 1929–32 Nordic Championship	Norway	1–0	Denmark	Aker, Norway
13:00 (UTC+1); Match 84	Kongsvik 82'	Report		Stadium: Ullevaal Stadion; Attendance: 27,000; Referee: Harvid Abrahamsson (Sweden)

2 November Friendly	Germany	1–1	Norway	Breslau, Germany
14:30 (UTC+1); Match 85	Hanke 55'	Report	Nilsen 72'	Stadium: Schlesierkampfbahn; Attendance: 41,000; Referee: Hans Boekman (Netherlands)

=== 1931 ===
25 May 1929–32 Nordic Championship	Denmark	3–1	Norway	Copenhagen, Denmark
13:30 (UTC+1); Match 86	Jørgensen 69', 73'; Christophersen 84' (pen.)	Report	Juve 43'	Stadium: Københavns Idrætspark; Attendance: 25,000; Referee: Willy Guyenz (Germany)

21 June Friendly	Norway	2–2	Germany	Aker, Norway
19:00 (UTC+1); Match 87	Moe 25', 61'	Report	Bergmaier 1'; Ludwig 60'	Stadium: Ullevaal Stadion; Attendance: 17,000; Referee: Ivan Eklind (Sweden)

6 September 1929–32 Nordic Championship	Finland	4–4	Norway	Helsinki, Finland
Match 88	Kanerva 3'; Salin 5'; Åström 49', 75'	Report	A. Børresen 9'; Johannesen 24'; Pettersen 32'; L. Børresen 56'	Stadium: Töölön Pallokenttä; Attendance: 700; Referee: Knut Lensing (Sweden)

27 September 1929–32 Nordic Championship	Norway	2–1	Sweden	Aker, Norway
13:15 (UTC+1); Match 89	Andersen 9'; Juve 38'	Report	Hansson 71'	Stadium: Ullevaal Stadion; Attendance: 28,208; Referee: Karl Weingärtner (Germany)

=== 1932 ===
5 June Friendly	Norway	3–0	Estonia	Aker, Norway
19:00 (UTC+1); Match 90	Juve 12', 20'; Pedersen 45'	Report		Stadium: Ullevaal Stadion; Attendance: 13,000; Referee: Yrjö Tuhkunen (Finland)

17 June 1929–32 Nordic Championship	Norway	2–1	Finland	Aker, Norway
19:30 (UTC+1); Match 91	Johannesen 51'	Report	Grönlund 35'	Stadium: Ullevaal Stadion; Attendance: 18,000; Referee: Carl Olsson (Sweden)

1 July 1929–32 Nordic Championship	Sweden	1–4	Norway	Gothenburg, Sweden
19:15 (UTC+1); Match 92	Holmberg 39' (pen.)	Report	Juve 8', 53'; Moe 69', 76'	Stadium: Ullevi; Attendance: 22,108; Referee: Raphaël van Praag (Belgium)

25 September 1929–32 Nordic Championship	Norway	1–2	Denmark	Aker, Norway
13:15 (UTC+1); Match 93	Juve 69'	Report	Jørgensen 35'; Hansen 61'	Stadium: Ullevaal Stadion; Attendance: 32,400; Referee: George Rudd (England)

=== 1933 ===
28 May Friendly	Norway	1–2	Wales	Bergen, Norway
13:00 (UTC+1); Match 94	Helgesen 29'	Report	Jones 63'; W. Foulkes 71' (pen.)	Stadium: Brann Stadion; Attendance: 4,000; Referee: George Rudd (England)

11 June 1933–36 Nordic Championship	Denmark	2–2	Norway	Copenhagen, Denmark
(UTC+1); Match 95	Thielsen 14', 35'	Report	Pedersen 33', 37'	Stadium: Københavns Idrætspark; Attendance: 28,000; Referee: Ivan Eklind (Sweden)

20 June Friendly	Norway	4–2	Hungary	Aker, Norway
19:30 (UTC+1); Match 96	Juve 3', 57'; Steen 38'; Hansen 85'	Report	Reiter 28'; Solti 75' (pen.)	Stadium: Ullevaal Stadion; Attendance: 12,000; Referee: Carl Olsson (Sweden)

3 September 1933–36 Nordic Championship	Finland	1–5	Norway	Helsinki, Finland
(UTC+2); Match 97	Åström 32'	Report	Juve 20', 36', 46'; Viinioksa 49' (o.g.); Hansen 83'	Stadium: Töölön Pallokenttä; Attendance: 6,271; Referee: Gustaf Ekberg (Sweden)

24 September 1933–36 Nordic Championship	Norway	0–1	Sweden	Aker, Norway
13:15 (UTC+1); Match 98		Report	Dunker 55'	Stadium: Ullevaal Stadion; Attendance: 33,000; Referee: Poul Yssing (Denmark)

5 November Friendly	Germany	2–2	Norway	Magdeburg, Germany
14:30 (UTC+1); Match 99	Albrecht 8'; Hohmann 33'	Report	Kvammen 63'; Juve 68'	Stadium: Sportplatz am Gübser Damm; Attendance: 40,000; Referee: Joop van Moorsel (Netherlands)

=== 1934 ===
8 June Friendly	Norway	4–0	Austria	Aker, Norway
19:30 (UTC+1); Match 100	Juve 4' (pen.); Berglie 15', 75' (pen.); Svendsen 48'	Report		Stadium: Ullevaal Stadion; Attendance: 20,000; Referee: Gustaf Ekberg (Sweden)

1 July 1933–36 Nordic Championship	Sweden	3–3	Norway	Stockholm, Sweden
19:00 (UTC+1); Match 101	Karlsson 5'; S. Andersson 13' (pen.); Ericsson 55'	Report	Pettersen 17' (pen.); Svendsen 29'; Pedersen 38'	Stadium: Olympic Stadium; Attendance: 20,000; Referee: Sophus Hansen (Denmark)

2 September 1933–36 Nordic Championship	Norway	4–2	Finland	Aker, Norway
13:15 (UTC+1); Match 102	Berglie 14', 21' (pen.); Kvammen 24'; Hansen 26'	Report	Lönnberg 27', 67'	Stadium: Ullevaal Stadion; Attendance: 15,000; Referee: Einer Ulrich (Denmark)

23 September 1933–36 Nordic Championship	Norway	3–1	Denmark	Aker, Norway
13:15 (UTC+1); Match 103	Berglie 62'; Hansen 78', 88'	Report	Lundsteen 57'	Stadium: Ullevaal Stadion; Attendance: 29,000; Referee: Ivan Eklind (Sweden)

=== 1935 ===
31 May Friendly	Norway	2–0	Hungary	Aker, Norway
19:30 (UTC+1); Match 104	Hansen 6'; Pedersen 87'	Report		Stadium: Ullevaal Stadion; Attendance: 12,800; Referee: Ragnar Bäckström (Sweden)

23 June 1933–36 Nordic Championship	Denmark	1–0	Norway	Copenhagen, Denmark
13:30 (UTC+1); Match 105		Report	Nordbø 29' (o.g.)	Stadium: Københavns Idrætspark; Attendance: 28,000; Referee: Esko Pekonen (Finland)

27 June Friendly	Norway	1–1	Germany	Aker, Norway
19:30 (UTC+1); Match 106	Hoel 64'	Report	Lenz 56'	Stadium: Ullevaal Stadion; Attendance: 22,000; Referee: Sölve Flisberg (Sweden)

8 September 1933–36 Nordic Championship	Finland	1–5	Norway	Helsinki, Finland
13:00 (UTC+2); Match 107	Larvo 28'	Report	Hoel 23', 52', 62'; Jamissen 68'; Kvammen 88'	Stadium: Töölön Pallokenttä; Attendance: 6,557; Referee: Ivar Gustafsson (Sweden)

22 September 1933–36 Nordic Championship	Norway	0–2	Sweden	Aker, Norway
13:15 (UTC+1); Match 108		Report	Nilsson 42'; Grahn 77'	Stadium: Ullevaal Stadion; Attendance: 35,495; Referee: Poul Drejø (Denmark)

3 November Friendly	Switzerland	2–0	Norway	Zürich, Switzerland
14:30 (UTC+1); Match 109	Stelzer 59'; Jäggi 73'	Report		Stadium: Hardturm; Attendance: 24,000; Referee: Karl Weingärtner (Germany)

=== 1936 ===
18 June Friendly	Norway	1–2	Switzerland	Aker, Norway
19:30 (UTC+1); Match 110	Hansen 7'	Report	Abegglen 38', 70'	Stadium: Ullevaal Stadion; Attendance: 15,000; Referee: Otto Ohlsson (Sweden)

5 July 1933–36 Nordic Championship	Sweden	2–0	Norway	Gothenburg, Sweden
13:00 (UTC+1); Match 111	Jonasson 25', 36'	Report		Stadium: Ullevi; Attendance: 21,133; Referee: Louis Baert (Belgium)

26 July Friendly	Sweden	3–4	Norway	Stockholm, Sweden
18:30 (UTC+1); Match 112	Persson 15', 66'; Jonasson 88' (pen.)	Report	Kvammen 17' (pen.), 43', 65'; Isaksen 29'	Stadium: Olympic Stadium; Attendance: 20,000; Referee: Karl Weingärtner (Germany)

3 August 1936 Summer Olympics; First round	Norway	4–0	Turkey	Berlin, Germany
17:30 (UTC+1); Match 113	Martinsen 30', 70'; Brustad 53'; Kvammen 80'	Report		Stadium: Mommsenstadion; Attendance: 8,000; Referee: Giuseppe Scarpi (Italy)

7 August 1936 Summer Olympics; Quarter-final	Germany	0–2	Norway	Berlin, Germany
17:30 (UTC+1); Match 114		Report	Isaksen 7', 83'	Stadium: Poststadion; Attendance: 35,000; Referee: Arthur Barton (England)

10 August 1936 Summer Olympics; Semi-finals	Italy	2–1	Norway	Berlin, Germany
17:00 (UTC+1); Match 115	Negro 15'; Frossi 96'	Report	Brustad 58'	Stadium: Olympiastadion; Attendance: 95,000; Referee: Hertzka Pál (Hungary)

13 August 1936 Summer Olympics; Bronze medal match	Norway	3–2	Poland	Berlin, Germany
16:00 (UTC+1); Match 116	Brustad 15', 21', 84'	Report	Wodarz 5'; Peterek 24'	Stadium: Olympiastadion; Attendance: 95,000; Referee: Alfred Birlem (Germany)

6 September 1933–36 Nordic Championship	Norway	0–2	Finland	Aker, Norway
13:15 (UTC+1); Match 117		Report	Weckström 3'; Lehtonen 48'	Stadium: Ullevaal Stadion; Attendance: 17,000; Referee: Otto Remke (Denmark)

20 September 1933–36 Nordic Championship	Norway	3–3	Denmark	Aker, Norway
13:15 (UTC+1); Match 118	Brustad 8'; Frantzen 11', 78'	Report	Søbirk 14', 67'; Jørgensen 49'	Stadium: Ullevaal Stadion; Attendance: 29,000; Referee: Karl Weingärtner (Germany)

1 November Friendly	Netherlands	3–3	Norway	Amsterdam, Netherlands
14:30 (UTC+00:20); Match 119	Bakhuys 46'; Smit 53'; de Bock 88'	Report	Martinsen 32'; Brustad 72', 79'	Stadium: Olympic Stadium; Attendance: 30,000; Referee: Alfred Birlem (Germany)

=== 1937 ===
14 May Friendly	Norway	0–6	England	Aker, Norway
19:15 (UTC+1); Match 120		Report	Kirchen 18'; Holmsen 38' (o.g.); Galley 40'; Steele 43', 61'; Goulden 85'	Stadium: Ullevaal Stadion; Attendance: 20,000; Referee: Einer Ulrich (Denmark)

27 May Friendly	Norway	1–3	Italy	Aker, Norway
19:15 (UTC+1); Match 121	Danielsen 76'	Report	Meazza 14'; Piola 20', 54'	Stadium: Ullevaal Stadion; Attendance: 27,000; Referee: Alfred Birlem (Germany)

13 June 1937–47 Nordic Championship	Denmark	5–1	Norway	Copenhagen, Denmark
19:30 (UTC+1); Match 122	Kleven 20'; Søbirk 30', 59'; Hansen 64'; Rasmussen 89'	Report	Martinsen 23'	Stadium: Københavns Idrætspark; Attendance: 22,000; Referee: Willy Peters (Germany)

5 September 1937–47 Nordic Championship	Finland	0–2	Norway	Helsinki, Finland
12:30 (UTC+1); Match 123		Report	Martinsen 21', 53'	Stadium: Töölön Pallokenttä; Attendance: 7,881; Referee: Sölve Flisberg (Sweden)

19 September 1937–47 Nordic Championship	Norway	3–2	Sweden	Aker, Norway
13:15 (UTC+1); Match 124	Brustad 44'; Isaksen 74'; Kvammen 76'	Report	Johansson 55'; Bunke 82'	Stadium: Ullevaal Stadion; Attendance: 29,344; Referee: Arthur W. Barton (England)

10 October 1938 FIFA World Cup qualification	Norway	3–2	Irish Free State	Aker, Norway
13:15 (UTC+1); Match 125	Kvammen 30', 69'; Martinsen 79'	Report	Geoghegan 55'; Dunne 49'	Stadium: Ullevaal Stadion; Attendance: 19,000; Referee: Peco Bauwens (Germany)

24 October Friendly	Germany	3–0	Norway	Berlin, Germany
15:00 (UTC+1); Match 126	Siffling 19', 29', 67'	Report		Stadium: Olympiastadion; Attendance: 95,000; Referee: Peter Snape (England)

7 November 1938 FIFA World Cup qualification	Irish Free State	3–3	Norway	Dublin, Irish Free State
15:00 (UTC+1); Match 127	Dunne 10'; O'Flanagan 62'; Duggan 89'	Report	Kvammen 26', 33'; Martinsen 49'	Stadium: Dalymount Park; Attendance: 27,000; Referee: Lionel Gibbs (England)

=== 1938 ===
31 May Friendly	Norway	1–0	Estonia	Aker, Norway
19:15 (UTC+1); Match 128	Brustad 65'	Report		Stadium: Ullevaal Stadion; Attendance: 19,200; Referee: Einar Lundström (Finland)

5 June 1938 FIFA World Cup; Round of 16	Italy	2–1 (a.e.t.)	Norway	Marseille, France
19:15 (UTC+1); Match 129	Ferraris 2'; Piola 94'	Report	Brustad 83'	Stadium: Stade Vélodrome; Attendance: 18,826; Referee: Alois Beranek (Germany)

17 June 1937–47 Nordic Championship	Norway	9–0	Finland	Aker, Norway
19:30 (UTC+1); Match 130	Isaksen 3'; Brustad 11', 22', 25', 33'; Kvammen 17' (pen.), 51'; Andersen 67'; Arnesen 70'	Report		Stadium: Ullevaal Stadion; Attendance: 28,000; Referee: Valdemar Laursen (Denmark)

4 September Friendly	Norway	2–1	Sweden	Aker, Norway
13:15 (UTC+1); Match 131	Arnesen 22'; Brynildsen 62'	Report	Hansson 15'	Stadium: Ullevaal Stadion; Attendance: 33,098; Referee: Valdemar Laursen (Denmark)

18 September 1937–47 Nordic Championship	Norway	1–1	Denmark	Aker, Norway
13:15 (UTC+1); Match 132	Arnesen 33'	Report	K. Hansen 42'	Stadium: Ullevaal Stadion; Attendance: 33,065; Referee: Rudolf Eklöw (Sweden)

2 October 1937–47 Nordic Championship	Sweden	2–3	Norway	Solna, Sweden
14:00 (UTC+1); Match 133	Persson 27'; Nyberg 66'	Report	Brustad 16'; Brynildsen 18'; Nordahl 35'	Stadium: Råsunda Stadium; Attendance: 38,000; Referee: James Jewell (England)

23 October Friendly	Poland	2–2	Norway	Warsaw, Poland
14:00 (UTC+1); Match 134	Piec 73'; Wilimowski 80'	Report	Nordahl 6'; A. Martinsen 41'	Stadium: Polish Army Stadium; Attendance: 16,000; Referee: John Langenus (Belgium)

9 November Friendly	England	4–0	Norway	Newcastle upon Tyne, England
14:30 (UTC); Match 135	Smith 13', 40'; Dix 20'; Lawton 35'	Report		Stadium: St James' Park; Attendance: 39,887; Referee: James Martin (Scotland)

=== 1939 ===
2 June Friendly	Sweden	3–2	Norway	Solna, Sweden
19:15 (UTC+1); Match 136	Martinsson 59'; Andersson 69'; Persson 84'	Report	Frantzen 39', 43'	Stadium: Råsunda Stadium; Attendance: 28,283; Referee: Valdemar Laursen (Denmark)

14 June Friendly; DBU 50th Anniversary Tournament; Semifinal	Norway	1–0	Sweden	Copenhagen, Denmark
19:00 (UTC+1); Match 137	Martinsen 83'	Report		Stadium: Københavns Idrætspark; Attendance: 18,000; Referee: Alfred Birlem (Germany)

18 June Friendly; DBU 50th Anniversary Tournament; Final	Denmark	6–3	Norway	Copenhagen, Denmark
13:30 (UTC+1); Match 138	P. Jørgensen 3', 54', 80'; Thielsen 17'; A. Sørensen 48'; Christensen 57'	Report	Frantzen 14'; Brustad 25'; Kvammen 41'	Stadium: Københavns Idrætspark; Attendance: 37,000; Referee: Alfred Birlem (Germany)

22 June Friendly	Norway	0–4	Germany	Aker, Norway
19:15 (UTC+1); Match 139		Report	Urban 14'; Janes 57'; Schön 59', 70'	Stadium: Ullevaal Stadion; Attendance: 29,100; Referee: Ivan Eklind (Sweden)

3 September 1937–47 Nordic Championship	Finland	1–2	Norway	Helsinki, Finland
17:00 (UTC+2); Match 140	Eronen 63'	Report	Andersen 7', 60'	Stadium: Helsinki Olympic Stadium; Attendance: 8,729; Referee: Rudolf Eklöw (Sweden)

17 September 1937–47 Nordic Championship	Norway	2–3	Sweden	Aker, Norway
13:15 (UTC+1); Match 141	Navestad 8' (pen.); Yven 84'	Report	Nyberg 19', 73'; Lennartsson 81'	Stadium: Ullevaal Stadion; Attendance: 29,504; Referee: Einer Ulrich (Denmark)

22 October 1937–47 Nordic Championship	Denmark	4–1	Norway	Copenhagen, Denmark
13:30 (UTC+1); Match 142	Albrechtsen 6'; Friedmann 49'; P. Jørgensen 68', 85'	Report	Brynildsen 33'	Stadium: Københavns Idrætspark; Attendance: 27,000; Referee: Ivan Eklind (Sweden)

== 1940s ==
=== 1945 ===
26 August Friendly	Denmark	4–2	Norway	Copenhagen, Denmark
13:00 (UTC+1); Match 143	Christiansen 7', 50'; K. Aa. Hansen 83'; Aa. R. Jensen 89'	Report	Spydevold 35'; Moe 44'	Stadium: Københavns Idrætspark; Attendance: 40,000; Referee: Torsten Carlsson (Sweden)

9 September Friendly	Norway	1–5	Denmark	Aker, Norway
13:15 (UTC+1); Match 144	Brynildsen 46'	Report	Bronée 30'; V. Jensen 41'; K. Aa. Hansen 67', 82'; Præst 84'	Stadium: Ullevaal Stadion; Attendance: 34,000; Referee: Ivan Eklind (Sweden)

21 October Friendly	Sweden	10–0	Norway	Solna, Sweden
14:00 (UTC+1); Match 145	Persson 1'; Nordahl 12', 26', 82', 89'; Carlsson 31', 61'; Nyberg 48', 85'; Gren 73'	Report		Stadium: Råsunda Stadium; Attendance: 29,674; Referee: Valdemar Laursen (Denmark)

=== 1946 ===
16 June Friendly	Norway	2–1	Denmark	Aker, Norway
18:00 (UTC+1); Match 146	Nordahl 9'; Osnes 58'	Report	J. L. Sørensen 24'	Stadium: Ullevaal Stadion; Attendance: 34,000; Referee: George Clark (England)

28 June Friendly	Norway	12–0	Finland	Bergen, Norway
18:00 (UTC+1); Match 147	Thoresen 15', 20', 62'; Sæthrang 18', 31', 69'; Osnes 30', 89'; Kvammen 34', 80'; Nordahl 59', 81'	Report		Stadium: Brann Stadion; Attendance: 22,000; Referee: Gunnar Dahlner (Sweden)

8 July Friendly	Denmark	2–0	Norway	Copenhagen, Denmark
19:00 (UTC+2); Match 148	Præst 38'; A. Sørensen 69' (pen.)	Report		Stadium: Københavns Idrætspark; Attendance: 39,000; Referee: John Oskar Nilsson (Sweden)

28 July Friendly	Luxembourg	3–2	Norway	Luxembourg City, Luxembourg
17:30 (UTC+2); Match 149	Schumacher 60', 66'; Pauly 70'	Report	Johannessen 30'; Dahlen 82'	Stadium: Stade Municipal; Attendance: 9,000; Referee: Laurent Franken (Belgium)

15 September Friendly	Norway	0–3	Sweden	Aker, Norway
13:00 (UTC+1); Match 150		Report	Nyberg 33'; Gren 75'; Karlsson 84'	Stadium: Ullevaal Stadion; Attendance: 35,321; Referee: Axel Asmussen (Denmark)

20 October Friendly	Denmark	7–1	Norway	Copenhagen, Denmark
13:30 (UTC+1); Match 151	Hansen 20', 52', 78', 89'; Sørensen 62'; Præst 65' (pen.), 85'	Report	Brynildsen 42' (pen.)	Stadium: Københavns Idrætspark; Attendance: 39,650; Referee: Folke Nyberg (Finland)

=== 1947 ===
11 June Friendly	Norway	3–1	Poland	Aker, Norway
19:00 (UTC+1); Match 152	Brynildsen 48', 63'; Arnesen 53'	Report	Jabłoński 89'	Stadium: Ullevaal Stadion; Attendance: 31,900; Referee: Ludvig Jørkov (Denmark)

26 June Friendly; SPL 40th Anniversary Tournament; Semi-final	Finland	1–2	Norway	Helsinki, Finland
19:00 (UTC+2); Match 153	Hasso 28'	Report	Karlsen 39' (pen.); Johannessen 85'	Stadium: Helsinki Olympic Stadium; Attendance: 14,806; Referee: Tore Sjöberg (Sweden)

28 June Friendly; SPL 40th Anniversary Tournament; Final	Norway	1–5	Sweden	Helsinki, Finland
(UTC+2); Match 154	Brynildsen 17'	Report	G. Nordahl 18', 56', 59', 85'; Persson 86'	Stadium: Helsinki Olympic Stadium; Attendance: 24,407; Referee: Johan Alho (Finland)

24 July Friendly	Iceland	2–4	Norway	Reykjavík, Iceland
20:30 (UTC); Match 155	A. Guðmundsson 4', 38'	Report	Brynildsen 6'; Thoresen 23', 29'; Sæthrang 44'	Stadium: Melavöllur; Attendance: 6,000; Referee: Lionel Gibbs (England)

7 September 1937–47 Nordic Championship	Finland	3–3	Norway	Helsinki, Finland
15:00 (UTC+2); Match 156	Reunanen 14'; Myntti 20', 23'	Report	Dahlen 21'; Sørensen 41'; Brynildsen 88' (pen.)	Stadium: Helsinki Olympic Stadium; Attendance: 13,533; Referee: Valdemar Laursen (Denmark)

21 September 1937–47 Nordic Championship	Norway	3–5	Denmark	Aker, Norway
13:15 (UTC+1); Match 157	Thoresen 35'; Osnes 42' (pen.), 71'	Report	G. Hansen 1' (o.g.); J. W. Hansen 10', 82'; Præst 13', 83'	Stadium: Ullevaal Stadion; Attendance: 34,756; Referee: John Oskar Nilsson (Sweden)

5 October 1937–47 Nordic Championship	Sweden	4–1	Norway	Solna, Sweden
15:00 (UTC+1); Match 158	Liedholm 9'; G. Nordahl 15', 70'; Gren 71'	Report	Kvammen 41'	Stadium: Råsunda Stadium; Attendance: 36,134; Referee: George Reader (England)

=== 1948 ===
26 May Friendly	Norway	1–2	Netherlands	Oslo, Norway
18:30 (UTC+1); Match 159	Sørensen 6'	Report	Clavan 33'; van der Tuijn 77'	Stadium: Ullevaal Stadion; Attendance: 28,800; Referee: Reg Leafe (England)

12 June 1948–51 Nordic Championship	Denmark	1–2	Norway	Copenhagen, Denmark
19:00 (UTC+2); Match 160	Jensen 24'	Report	Sørdahl 37', 50'	Stadium: Københavns Idrætspark; Attendance: 41,000; Referee: Gunnar Dahlner (Sweden)

6 August Friendly	Norway	11–0	United States	Oslo, Norway
18:30 (UTC+1); Match 161	Sørdahl 1', 43'; Sørensen 3', 8', 27', 29', 47'; Thoresen 25', 57', 85'; Dahlen 84'	Report		Stadium: Bislett Stadion; Attendance: 24,362; Referee: John Erik Andersson (Sweden)

5 September 1948–51 Nordic Championship	Norway	2–0	Finland	Oslo, Norway
13:15 (UTC+1); Match 162	Sørensen 2', 50'	Report		Stadium: Ullevaal Stadion; Attendance: 24,389; Referee: Ivan Eklind (Sweden)

19 September 1948–51 Nordic Championship	Norway	3–5	Sweden	Oslo, Norway
13:15 (UTC+1); Match 163	Dahlen 11'; Toresen 33'; Sørdahl 84'	Report	G. Nordahl 24', 44', 62', 74', 80'	Stadium: Ullevaal Stadion; Attendance: 35,306; Referee: Axel Asmussen (Denmark)

24 December Friendly	Egypt	1–1	Norway	Cairo, Egypt
15:00 (UTC+2); Match 164	El-Sabbagh 11' (pen.)	Report	Sørensen 55'	Stadium: Egyptian Army Stadium; Attendance: 8,000; Referee: Scott (England)

=== 1949 ===
18 May Friendly	Norway	1–4	England	Oslo, Norway
19:00 (UTC+1); Match 165	Andresen 50'	Report	Mullen 5'; Finney 38'; Spydevold 60' (o.g.); Morris 70'	Stadium: Ullevaal Stadion; Attendance: 32,874; Referee: John Erik Andersson (Sweden)

19 June Friendly	Norway	1–3	Yugoslavia	Oslo, Norway
18:15 (UTC+1); Match 166	Bredesen 60'	Report	Mitić 76'; Bobek 84'; Čajkovski 88'	Stadium: Ullevaal Stadion; Attendance: 23,163; Referee: Klaas Schipper (Netherlands)

8 July 1948–51 Nordic Championship	Finland	1–1	Norway	Helsinki, Finland
(UTC+2); Match 167	Vaihela 33'	Report	Sørensen 89'	Stadium: Helsinki Olympic Stadium; Attendance: 11,264; Referee: Axel Asmussen (Denmark)

11 September 1948–51 Nordic Championship	Norway	0–2	Denmark	Oslo, Norway
13:15 (UTC+1); Match 168		Report	Reckendorff 28'; J. P. Hansen 84'	Stadium: Ullevaal Stadion; Attendance: 38,085; Referee: Wolf Karni (Finland)

2 October 1948–51 Nordic Championship	Sweden	3–3	Norway	Solna, Sweden
15:00 (UTC+1); Match 169	Lindskog 60'; Jeppson 76'; Simonsson 79'	Report	Bredesen 15', 89'; Hennum 75'	Stadium: Råsunda Stadium; Attendance: 37,750; Referee: Valdemar Laursen (Denmark)

== 1950s ==
=== 1950 ===
22 June 1948–51 Nordic Championship	Denmark	4–0	Norway	Copenhagen, Denmark
19:00 (UTC+1); Match 170	Petersen 21'; E. Hansen 38' (pen.); J. P. Hansen 48'; Jensen 58'	Report		Stadium: Københavns Idrætspark; Attendance: 35,500; Referee: Tore Sjöberg (Sweden)

15 August Friendly	Norway	2–2	Luxembourg	Bergen, Norway
18:00 (UTC+1); Match 171	Thoresen 60'; Andersen 78'	Report	Letsch 6'; Muller 59'	Stadium: Brann Stadion; Attendance: 16,000; Referee: Ernst Hansen (Denmark)

10 September 1948–51 Nordic Championship	Norway	4–1	Finland	Oslo, Norway
13:15 (UTC+1); Match 172	Bredesen 10'; Andresen 50', 52'; Thoresen 81'	Report	Lilja 87'	Stadium: Ullevaal Stadion; Attendance: 28,935; Referee: Ludvig Jørkov (Denmark)

24 September 1948–51 Nordic Championship	Norway	1–3	Sweden	Oslo, Norway
13:15 (UTC+1); Match 173	Karlsen 88' (pen.)	Report	Jönsson 53', 79'; Palmér 55'	Stadium: Ullevaal Stadion; Attendance: 35,552; Referee: Folke Nyberg (Finland)

5 November Friendly	Yugoslavia	4–0	Norway	Belgrade, Yugoslavia
14:15 (UTC+1); Match 174	Ognjanov 35', 46'; Mitić 40'; Rupnik 45'	Report		Stadium: JNA Stadium; Attendance: 55,000; Referee: Klaas Schipper (Netherlands)

26 November Friendly	Republic of Ireland	2–2	Norway	Dublin, Republic of Ireland
14:30 (UTC); Match 175	Carey 24'; Walsh 61'	Report	Bredesen 6'; Andresen 11'	Stadium: Dalymount Park; Attendance: 31,215; Referee: Henry Pearce (England)

=== 1951 ===
15 May Friendly	England	2–1	Norway	Middlesbrough, England
18:00 (UTC+1); Match 176	Noble (?); Robb (?)	Report	Sveinsson 87'	Stadium: Ayresome Park; Attendance: 12,000; Referee: Paddy Power (England)
Note: England played with their amateur team.

30 May Friendly	Norway	2–3	Republic of Ireland	Oslo, Norway
19:00 (UTC+1); Match 177	Sørensen 14'; Hvidsten 55'	Report	Farell 17'; Ringstead 67'; Coad 82'	Stadium: Ullevaal Stadion; Attendance: 20,913; Referee: Carl Frederik Jørgensen (Denmark)

6 June Friendly	Netherlands	2–3	Norway	Rotterdam, Netherlands
19:00 (UTC+1); Match 178	van Melis 44'; Lenstra 50'	Report	Johannessen 26', 59'; Sørensen 29'	Stadium: De Kuip; Attendance: 65,000; Referee: Giovani Galeati (Italy)

26 July Friendly	Norway	3–1	Iceland	Trondheim, Norway
19:00 (UTC+1); Match 179	Hennum 44'; Bjarnason 81' (o.g.); Hvidsten 90'	Report	Jónsson 82'	Stadium: Lerkendal Stadion; Attendance: 17,000; Referee: Helge Andersen (Denmark)

16 August 1948–51 Nordic Championship	Finland	1–1	Norway	Helsinki, Finland
18:30 (UTC+2); Match 180	Vaihela 41'	Report	Bredesen 64'	Stadium: Helsinki Olympic Stadium; Attendance: 22,415; Referee: John Oskar Nilsson (Sweden)

23 August Friendly	Norway	2–4	Yugoslavia	Oslo, Norway
18:00 (UTC+1); Match 181	Dybwad 33', 57'	Report	Vukas 8'; Bobek 23', 30'; Zebec 27'	Stadium: Ullevaal Stadion; Attendance: 30,867; Referee: Aksel Asmussen (Denmark)

16 September 1948–51 Nordic Championship	Norway	2–0	Denmark	Oslo, Norway
13:15 (UTC+1); Match 182	Thoresen 26'; Jørgensen 40' (o.g.)	Report		Stadium: Ullevaal Stadion; Attendance: 35,322; Referee: John Oskar Nilsson (Sweden)

30 September 1948–51 Nordic Championship	Sweden	3–4	Norway	Gothenburg, Sweden
14:30 (UTC+1); Match 183	Rydell 13', 52'; Lindh 23' (pen.)	Report	Karlsen 5' (pen.), 71' (pen.); Dahlen 6'; Bredesen 64'	Stadium: Ullevi; Attendance: 29,790; Referee: Valdemar Laursen (Denmark)

=== 1952 ===
10 June Friendly; NFF 50th Anniversary Tournament; Semi-final	Norway	1–2	Finland	Oslo, Norway
19:00 (UTC+1); Match 184	Johannessen 33'	Report	Rikberg 45', 49'	Stadium: Bislett Stadion; Attendance: 21,732; Referee: John Erik Andersson (Sweden)

25 June Friendly	Yugoslavia	4–1	Norway	Zagreb, Yugoslavia
18:00 (UTC+1); Match 185	Vukas 8', 10'; Mitić 18'; Zebec 59'	Report	Sagvaag 19'	Stadium: Stadion Maksimir; Attendance: 30,000; Referee: Eugène Scherz (Switzerland)

21 July 1952 Summer Olympics First round	Norway	1–4	Sweden	Tampere, Finland
19:00 (UTC+2); Match 186	Sørensen 82'	Report	Brodd 23', 35'; Rydell 81'; Bengtsson 89'	Stadium: Ratina Stadion; Attendance: 4,072; Referee: Johan Aksel Alho (Finland)

31 August 1952–55 Nordic Championship	Norway	7–2	Finland	Oslo, Norway
13:15 (UTC+1); Match 187	Thoresen 18', 55'; Kristiansen 36', 47', 75'; Sørensen 70', 85'	Report	Lehtovirta 16'; Rikberg 80'	Stadium: Ullevaal Stadion; Attendance: 24,025; Referee: John Oskar Nilsson (Sweden)

5 October 1952–55 Nordic Championship	Norway	1–2	Sweden	Oslo, Norway
13:15 (UTC+1); Match 188	H. Johannessen 42'	Report	Jacobsson 32'; Persson 73'	Stadium: Ullevaal Stadion; Attendance: 36,458; Referee: Leo Helge (Denmark)

19 October 1952–55 Nordic Championship	Denmark	1–3	Norway	Copenhagen, Denmark
13:30 (UTC+1); Match 189	Jensen 57'	Report	Sørensen 19'; Nordahl 61'; Jevne 77'	Stadium: Københavns Idrætspark; Attendance: 41,000; Referee: Gösta Lindberg (Sweden)

=== 1953 ===
19 May Friendly	Norway	1–1	England	Oslo, Norway
19:00 (UTC+1); Match 190	Jevne 26'	Report	Saunders (?)	Stadium: Ullevaal Stadion; Attendance: 19,978; Referee: Sten Ahlner (Sweden)

24 June 1954 FIFA World Cup qualification	Norway	2–3	Saar	Oslo, Norway
	Thoresen 3'; Dahlen 15'	Report	Binkert 16'; Otto 30'; Siedl 55'	Stadium: Bislett Stadium; Attendance: 21,000; Referee: Jan Bronkhorst (Netherlands)

13 August Friendly	Norway	3–1	Iceland	Bergen, Norway
	Kristiansen 8'; Dybwad 15'; Thoresen 23'	Report	Gunnarsson 43'	Stadium: Brann Stadion; Attendance: 12,000; Referee: John Erik Andersson (Sweden)

19 August 1954 FIFA World Cup qualification	Norway	1–1	West Germany	Oslo, Norway
	Hennum 41'	Report	Walter 44'	Stadium: Ullevaal Stadion; Attendance: 32,266; Referee: Bertus Ausum (Netherlands)

30 August 1952–55 Nordic Football Championship	Finland	1–4	Norway	Helsinki, Finland
	Lahtinen 39'	Report	Hennum 6'; Thoresen 8', 44'; Angell-Hansen 47'	Stadium: Helsinki Olympic Stadium; Attendance: 20,819; Referee: Helge Andersen (Denmark)

13 September 1952–55 Nordic Football Championship	Norway	0–1	Denmark	Oslo, Norway
		Report	Sørensen 32'	Stadium: Ullevaal Stadion; Attendance: 35,552; Referee: Gösta Lindberg (Sweden)

27 September Friendly	Norway	4–0	Netherlands	Oslo, Norway
	Thoresen 54', 73'; Nordahl 58'; Dybwad 67'	Report		Stadium: Ullevaal Stadion; Attendance: 24,532; Referee: Leo Helge (Denmark)

18 October 1952–55 Nordic Football Championship	Sweden	0–0	Norway	Solna, Sweden
		Report		Stadium: Råsunda Stadium; Attendance: 27,025; Referee: Folke Nyberg (Finland)

8 November 1954 FIFA World Cup qualification	Saar	0–0	Norway	Saarbrücken, Saar Protectorate
		Report		Stadium: Ludwigsparkstadion; Attendance: 42,000; Referee: Leo Horn (Netherlands)

22 November 1954 FIFA World Cup qualification	West Germany	5–1	Norway	Hamburg, West Germany
	Morlock 26', 63'; O. Walter 69'; F. Walter 80'; Rahn 86'	Report	Nordahl 22'	Stadium: Volksparkstadion; Attendance: 76,000; Referee: Arthur Luty (England)

=== 1954 ===
5 May Friendly	Scotland	1–0	Norway	Glasgow, Scotland
	Hamilton 35'	Report		Stadium: Hampden Park; Attendance: 25,897; Referee: Jack Clough (England)

19 May Friendly	Norway	1–1	Scotland	Oslo, Norway
	Kure 88'	Report	McKenzie 55'	Stadium: Ullevaal Stadion; Attendance: 23,849; Referee: John Erik Andersson (Sweden)

30 May Friendly	Austria	5–0	Norway	Vienna, Austria
	Schleger 48'; Happel 53'; Probst 61', 68'; Karlsen 76' (o.g.)	Report		Stadium: Praterstadion; Attendance: 46,000; Referee: Albert Meißner (West Germany)

4 June SvFF 50th Anniversary Tournament (semi-final)	Denmark	1–2 (a.e.t.)	Norway	Malmö, Sweden
	Kendzior 15'	Report	Ljostveit 78'; Kure 102'	Stadium: Malmö Idrottsplats; Attendance: 16,000; Referee: John Oskar Nilsson (Sweden)

7 June SvFF 50th Anniversary Tournament (final)	Sweden	3–0	Norway	Solna, Sweden
	Svensson 33' (pen.); Jacobsson 41'; Sandell 53'	Report		Stadium: Råsunda Stadium; Attendance: 20,837; Referee: Johan Alho (Finland)

4 July Friendly	Iceland	1–0	Norway	Reykjavík, Iceland
	Þórður Þórðarson 29'	Report		Stadium: Melavöllur; Attendance: 7,500; Referee: Guðjón Einarsson (Iceland)

29 August 1952–55 Nordic Football Championship	Norway	3–1	Finland	Oslo, Norway
	Dybwad 57'; Johannessen 59'; Hennum 62'	Report	Hiltunen 6'	Stadium: Ullevaal Stadion; Attendance: 21,048; Referee: Helge Andersen (Denmark)

19 September 1952–55 Nordic Football Championship	Norway	1–1	Sweden	Oslo, Norway
	Sundby 75'	Report	Eriksson 68'	Stadium: Ullevaal Stadion; Attendance: 35,427; Referee: Tauno Aro (Finland)

31 October 1952–55 Nordic Football Championship	Denmark	0–1	Norway	Copenhagen, Denmark
		Report	Hennum 81'	Stadium: Københavns Idrætspark; Attendance: 36,200; Referee: John Erik Andersson (Sweden)

7 November Friendly	Republic of Ireland	2–1	Norway	Dublin, Republic of Ireland
	Martin 59'; Ryan 66' (pen.)	Report	Olsen (footballer) 13'	Stadium: Dalymount Park; Attendance: 34,000; Referee: Jack Clough (England)

=== 1955 ===
8 May Friendly	Norway	0–5	Hungary	Oslo, Norway
		Report	Kocsis 6'; Palotás 33', 55'; Puskás 49'; Tichy 74'	Stadium: Ullevaal Stadion; Attendance: 27,548; Referee: Leo Helge (Denmark)

25 May Friendly	Norway	1–3	Republic of Ireland	Oslo, Norway
	Kotte 39'	Report	Cummins 17', 70'; Ringstead 80'	Stadium: Bislett Stadium; Attendance: 18,574; Referee: Albert Meißner (West Germany)

12 June Friendly	Norway	0–1	Romania	Oslo, Norway
		Report	Ozon 15'	Stadium: Ullevaal Stadion; Attendance: 17,506; Referee: Wolf Karni (Finland)

14 August 1952–55 Nordic Football Championship	Finland	1–3	Norway	Helsinki, Finland
	Hiltunen 6'	Report	Hennum 26', 55'; Kure 70'	Stadium: Helsinki Olympic Stadium; Attendance: 16,916; Referee: Ludvig Jørkov (Denmark)

11 September 1952–55 Nordic Football Championship	Norway	1–1	Denmark	Oslo, Norway
	Nielsen 52' (o.g.)	Report	Jacobsen 75'	Stadium: Ullevaal Stadion; Attendance: 33,836; Referee: Aarne Eriksson (Finland)

25 September 1952–55 Nordic Football Championship	Sweden	1–1	Norway	Solna, Sweden
	Nilsson 4'	Report	Kotte 7'	Stadium: Råsunda Stadium; Attendance: 27,375; Referee: Leo Helge (Denmark)

6 November Friendly	Netherlands	3–0	Norway	Amsterdam, Netherlands
	Bosselaar 29', 36'; Appel 83'	Report		Stadium: Olympic Stadium; Attendance: 60,000; Referee: Gérard Versyp (Belgium)

16 November Friendly	West Germany	2–0	Norway	Karlsruhe, West Germany
	Walter 24'; Röhrig 27'	Report		Stadium: Wildparkstadion; Attendance: 49,700; Referee: Friedrich Seipelt (Austria)
