= 1933–36 Nordic Football Championship =

Tournament details
- Host countries: Denmark; Finland; Norway; Sweden
- Dates: 11 June 1933 – 27 September 1936
- Teams: 4

Final positions
- Champions: Sweden (1st title)
- Runners-up: Denmark
- Third place: Norway
- Fourth place: Finland

Tournament statistics
- Matches played: 24
- Goals scored: 104 (4.33 per match)
- Top scorer(s): (Denmark) Pauli Jørgensen (Sweden) Bertil Ericsson (8 goals each)

The 1933–36 Nordic Football Championship was the third Nordic Football Championship staged. Four Nordic countries participated, Denmark, Finland, Norway and Sweden. The tournament was arranged by the Football Association of Norway. The trophy was named the Nordiske Pokal (Nordic Trophy). A total of 24 matches were played with 104 goals scored giving an average of 4.33 goals per match.

== Results ==
=== 1933 ===
11 June 1933
13:30 (UTC+1:00)

Denmark	2–2	Norway
Thielsen 14', 35'	Report	Pedersen 33', 37'

Idrætsparken, Copenhagen
Attendance: 28,000
Referee: Ivan Eklind (Sweden)
18 June 1933
14:00 (UTC+1:00)

Sweden	2–3	Denmark
Ericsson 7', 20'	Report	Jørgensen 27'; Kleven 57', 82'

Stockholms Stadion, Stockholm
Attendance: 20,297
Referee: Karl Wunderlin (Switzerland)
14 July 1933
19:00 (UTC+1:00)

Sweden	2–0	Finland
Kroon 58' (pen.); Bunke 86'	Report

Stockholms Stadion, Stockholm, Sweden
Attendance: 15,246
Referee: Poul Yssing (Denmark)
3 September 1933
13:00 (UTC+2:00)

Finland	1–5	Norway
Åström 32'	Report	Juve 20', 36', 46'; Viinioksa 49' (o.g.); Hansen 83'

Töölön Pallokenttä, Helsinki, Finland
Attendance: 6,271
Referee: Gustaf Ekberg (Sweden)
24 September 1933
13:15 (UTC+1:00)

Norway	0–1	Sweden
	Report	Dunker 55'

Ullevaal, Oslo, Norway
Attendance: 35,000
Referee: Poul Yssing (Denmark)
8 October 1933
13:30 (UTC+1:00)

Denmark	2–0	Finland
Taarup 30'; Uldaler 57'	Report

Idrætsparken, Copenhagen, Denmark
Attendance: 24,000
Referee: Thoralv Kristiansen (Norway)

=== 1934 ===
17 June 1934
13:30 (UTC+1:00)

Denmark	3–5	Sweden
Uldaler 5'; Jørgensen 40', 48'	Report	Ericsson 6', 35', 60', 62'; Persson 23'

Idrætsparken, Copenhagen, Denmark
Attendance: 30,000
Referee: Thoralv Kristiansen (Norway)
1 July 1934
19:00 (UTC+1:00)

Sweden	3–3	Norway
Karlsson 5'; Andersson 13' (pen.); Ericsson 55'	Report	Pettersen 17' (pen.); Svendsen 29'; Pedersen 38'

Stockholms Stadion, Stockholm, Sweden
Attendance: 20,000
Referee: Sophus Hansen (Denmark)
3 July 1934
19:00 (UTC+2:00)

Finland	2–1	Denmark
Taipale 19'; Salin 63'	Report	Lundsteen 30'

Pallokenttä, Helsinki
Attendance: 5,722
Referee: Georg Wittbolt (Sweden)
2 September 1934
13:15 (UTC+1:00)

Norway	4–2	Finland
Berglie 14', 21' (pen.); Kvammen 24'; Hansen 26'	Report	Lönnberg 27', 67'

Ullevaal Stadion, Oslo, Norway
Attendance: 15,000
Referee: Einer Ulrich (Denmark)
23 September 1934
14:15 (UTC+2:00)

Finland	5–4	Sweden
Koponen 2', 21'; Lintamo 33', 50'; Åström 49'	Report	Persson 6', 42', 87'; Keller 59'

Töölön Pallokenttä, Helsinki, Finland
Attendance: 10,442
Referee: Otto Remke (Denmark)
23 September 1934
13:15 (UTC+1:00)

Norway	3–1	Denmark
Berglie 62'; Hansen 78', 88'	Report	Lundsteen 57'

Ullevaal, Oslo, Norway
Attendance: 30,000
Referee: Ivan Eklind (Sweden)

=== 1935 ===
12 June 1935
19:15 (UTC+1:00)

Sweden	2–2	Finland
Persson 46'; Nyberg 80'	Report	Weckström 11', 70'

Stockholms Stadion, Stockholm, Sweden
Attendance: 14,500
Referee: Thoralf Kristiansen (Norway)
16 June 1935
13:00 (UTC+1:00)

Sweden	3–1	Denmark
Grahn 44'; Jonasson 54'; Hallman 83'	Report	Jørgensen 34'

Gamla Ullevi, Gothenburg, Sweden
Attendance: 30,000
Referee: Albert Fogg (England)
23 June 1935
13:30 (UTC+1:00)

Denmark	1–0	Norway
Nordbø 29' (o.g.)	Report

Idrætsparken, Copenhagen, Denmark
Attendance: 28,000
Referee: Esko Pekonen (Finland)
8 September 1935
13:00 (UTC+2:00)

Finland	1–5	Norway
Larvo 28'	Report	Hoel 23', 52', 62'; Jamissen 68'; Kvammen 88'

Töölön Pallokenttä, Helsinki, Finland
Attendance: 6,557
Referee: Ivar Gustafsson (Sweden)
22 September 1935
13:15 (UTC+1:00)

Norway	0–2	Sweden
	Report	Nilsson 42'; Grahn 77'

Ullevaal Stadion, Oslo, Norway
Attendance: 35,495
Referee: Poul Drejø (Denmark)
6 October 1935
13:30 (UTC+1:00)

Denmark	5–1	Finland
Thielsen 8'; Uldaler 37', 41'; Sørensen 51'; Kleven 59'	Report	Grönlund 48'

Idrætsparken, Copenhagen, Denmark
Attendance: 27,000
Referee: John Johansson (Sweden)

=== 1936 ===
14 June 1936
13:30 (UTC+1:00)

Denmark	4–3	Sweden
Søbirk 11'; Sven Andersson 41' (o.g.); Jørgensen 47'; Thielsen 81'	Report	Jensen 2' (o.g.); Jonasson 15'; Josefsson 76'

Idrætsparken, Copenhagen, Denmark
Attendance: 35,600
Referee: Thoralv Kristiansen (Norway)
30 June 1936
19:00 (UTC+2:00)

Finland	1–4	Denmark
Salin 17'	Report	Jørgensen 65', 81'; Kleven 77'; Hansen 89'

Pallokenttä, Helsinki, Finland
Attendance: 8,357
Referee: Sölve Flisberg (Sweden)
5 July 1936
13:00 (UTC+1:00)

Sweden	2–0	Norway
Jonasson 25', 36'	Report

Gamla Ullevi, Gothenburg, Sweden
Attendance: 21,133
Referee: Louis Baert (Belgium)
6 September 1936
13:15 (UTC+1:00)

Norway	0–2	Finland
	Report	Weckström 3'; Lehtonen 48'

Ullevaal Stadion, Oslo, Norway
Attendance: 17,000
Referee: Otto Remke (Denmark)
20 September 1936
13:15 (UTC+1:00)

Norway	3–3	Denmark
Brustad 8'; Frantzen 11', 78'	Report	Søbirk 14', 67'; Jørgensen 49'

Ullevaal Stadion, Oslo
Attendance: 30,000
Referee: Karl Weingärtner (Germany)
27 September 1936
13:00 (UTC+2:00)

Finland	1–2	Sweden
Kanerva 85' (pen.)	Report	Jonasson 44'; Ericsson 50'

Töölön Pallokenttä, Helsinki, Finland
Attendance: 11,922
Referee: Kolbjørn Dæhlen (Norway)

== Table ==
	Team	Pld	W	D	L	GF	GA	GD	Pts
1	Sweden	12	7	2	3	31	22	+9	16
2	Denmark	12	6	2	4	30	25	+5	14
3	Norway	12	4	3	5	25	21	+4	11
4	Finland	12	3	1	8	18	36	−18	7

== Winner ==
1933–36 Nordic Football Championship

Sweden
first title

== Statistics ==
=== Goalscorers ===
There were 104 goals scored in 24 matches, for an average of 4.33 goals per match.

8 goals

- (Denmark) Pauli Jørgensen
- (Sweden) Bertil Ericsson

5 goals

- (Sweden) Sven Jonasson
- (Sweden) Erik Persson

4 goals

- (Denmark) Eyolf Kleven
- (Denmark) Eigil Thielsen
- (Denmark) Kaj Uldaler
- (Norway) Sverre Hansen

3 goals

- (Denmark) Helmut Søbirk
- (Finland) Kurt Weckström
- (Norway) Jørgen Juve
- (Norway) Odd Hoel
- (Norway) Sverre Berglie

2 goals

- (Denmark) Carl Lundsteen
- (Finland) Gunnar Åström
- (Finland) Nuutti Lintamo
- (Finland) Albin Lönnberg
- (Finland) Holger Salin
- (Norway) Odd Frantzen
- (Norway) Reidar Kvammen
- (Norway) Ragnar Pedersen
- (Sweden) Karl-Erik Grahn
- (Sweden) Gustaf Josefsson

1 goal

- (Denmark) Kaj Hansen
- (Denmark) Thøger Nordbø
- (Denmark) Knud Sørensen
- (Denmark) Georg Taarup
- (Finland) Ernst Grönlund
- (Finland) William Kanerva
- (Finland) Aulis Koponen
- (Finland) Pentti Larvo
- (Finland) Aatos Lehtonen
- (Finland) Lauri Taipale
- (Norway) Arne Brustad
- (Norway) Carl Jamissen
- (Norway) Birger Pedersen
- (Norway) Morten Pettersen
- (Norway) Thorleif Svendsen
- (Sweden) Sven Andersson
- (Sweden) Lennart Bunke
- (Sweden) Gösta Dunker
- (Sweden) Åke Hallman
- (Sweden) Emil Karlsson
- (Sweden) Tore Keller
- (Sweden) Knut Kroon
- (Sweden) Axel Nilsson
- (Sweden) Arne Nyberg

1 own goal

- (Finland) Max Viinioksa (against Norway)
- (Sweden) Sven Andersson (against Denmark)
- (Denmark) Poul Toft Jensen (against Sweden)

== See also ==
- Balkan Cup
- Baltic Cup
- Central European International Cup
- Mediterranean Cup
