= 1954 Norwegian Football Cup =

Norgesmesterskapet i fotball for menn 1954

Tournament details
- Country: Norway
- Teams: 128 (main competition)

Final positions
- Champions: Skeid (2nd title)
- Runners-up: Fredrikstad

The 1954 Norwegian Football Cup was the 49th season of the Norwegian annual knockout football tournament. The tournament was open for all members of NFF, except those from Northern Norway. The final was played at Ullevaal Stadion in Oslo on 24 October 1954, and was contested by six-time winners Fredrikstad, and Skeid, who had won the cup once (1947). Skeid secured their second title with a 3–0 win in the final. Viking was the defending champions, but was eliminated by Larvik Turn in the quarterfinal.

== First round ==
Team 1	Score	Team 2
Asker	2–0	Haga
Borg	0–1	Fram (Larvik)
Brage	4–3	Sverre
Brann	3–1	Nymark
Brumunddal	2–2 (a.e.t.)	Solberg
Bryne	3–0	Klepp
Clausenengen	3–0	Halsa
Djerv 1919	2–1	Vidar
Drafn	6–1	Einastrand
Drammens BK	2–2 (a.e.t.)	Sagene
Eik	4–0	Sprint-Jeløy
Falken	2–3	National
Fjellkameratene	0–4	Baune
Flekkefjord	4–8	Nærbø
Freidig	5–2	Tryggkam
Frigg	6–2	Ørje
Geithus	6–0	Nordstrand
Grue	0–8	Lyn
HamKam	1–3	Aurskog
Herkules	1–0	Sportsklubben 1931
Jerv	6–0	AIK Lund
Kapp	5–4 (a.e.t.)	Aasen
Kristiansund	7–2	Goma
Langevåg	1–2	Hødd
Larvik Turn	8–0	Gjerpen
Lillestrøm	12–1	Flisa
Lisleby	8–1	Bjørkelangen
Mesna	1–2 (a.e.t.)	Strømmen
Mjøndalen	1–2 (a.e.t.)	Selbak
Molde	0–0 (a.e.t.)	Wing
Moss	4–0	Grüner
Nedenes	0–2	Sørfjell
Nessegutten	1–2	Kvik (Trondheim)
Nydalen	0–3	Fredrikstad
Os	3–1	Fana
Pors	4–3	Kongsberg
Ranheim	3–1	Neset
Rapid	4–4 (a.e.t.)	Hamar
Raufoss	5–3 (a.e.t.)	Kjelsås
Rosenborg	3–1	Steinkjer
Sandefjord BK	0–1	Strømsgodset
Sarpsborg	3–0	Gresvik
Sem	0–3	Odd
Skeid	2–0	Slemmestad
Skiens BK	3–1	Vestfossen
Snøgg	0–3	Sandaker
Sparta	11–1	Borre
Spartacus	0–10	Greåker
Stabæk	1–4	Askim
Start	3–2	Donn
Stavanger	2–0	Vard
Steinberg	1–0	Gjøvik-Lyn
Storm	1–2	Kragerø
Trauma	1–4	Urædd
Tønsberg Turn	1–0	Jevnaker
Ulf	1–3	Ålgård
Varegg	7–3	Jotun
Viking	4–1	Buøy
Voss	0–1	Nordnes
Vålerengen	6–0	Vang
Ørn	6–0	Tune
Ørsta	3–3 (a.e.t.)	Rollon
Aalesund	5–1	Aksla
Årstad	2–5	Djerv
Replay
Hamar	2–0	Rapid
Rollon	2–1	Ørsta
Sagene	1–0	Drammens BK
Solberg	2–3	Brumunddal
Wing	2–3	Molde

== Second round ==
Team 1	Score	Team 2
Asker	3–2	Tønsberg Turn
Askim	0–2	Skeid
Aurskog	3–2	Vålerengen
Brann	5–1	Os
Brumunddal	0–3	Lillestrøm
Djerv	1–1 (a.e.t.)	Bryne
Djerv 1919	1–4	Varegg
Fram (Larvik)	1–0	Skiens BK
Fredrikstad	7–2	Steinberg
Freidig	4–0	Clausenengen
Greåker	3–0	Eik
Hamar	2–2 (a.e.t.)	Geithus
Herkules	3–0	Drafn
Kristiansund	8–1	Rollon
Kvik (Trondheim)	4–1	Rosenborg
Lyn	1–0	Ørn
Molde	5–3	Brage
Nordnes	1–2	Baune
Nærbø	2–5	Stavanger
Odd	3–1	Jerv
Ranheim	6–2	National
Sagene	0–4	Pors
Sandaker	0–4	Sarpsborg
Selbak	0–2 (a.e.t.)	Frigg
Sparta	2–0	Raufoss
Start	3–2	Kragerø
Strømmen	4–0	Lisleby
Strømsgodset	2–4	Kapp
Sørfjell	0–8	Larvik Turn
Urædd	2–4	Moss
Aalesund	3–1	Hødd
Ålgård	0–3	Viking
Replay
Bryne	2–1	Djerv
Geithus	2–0	Hamar

== Third round ==
Team 1	Score	Team 2
8 August 1954
Sarpsborg	1–0	Herkules
Moss	3–1	Fram (Larvik)
Frigg	2–1	Odd
Skeid	3–0	Molde
Lillestrøm	4–1	Aurskog
Kapp	2–1	Ranheim
Geithus	1–2	Sparta
Larvik Turn	8–4	Greåker
Pors	2–1 (a.e.t.)	Asker
Bryne	2–4	Lyn
Stavanger	1–3	Fredrikstad
Viking	3–2	Start
Varegg	0–3	Strømmen
Kristiansund	2–1	Kvik (Trondheim)
Freidig	3–1	Aalesund
9 August 1954
Baune	1–4	Brann

== Fourth round ==
Team 1	Score	Team 2
5 September 1954
Sparta	2–1	Moss
Fredrikstad	4–2	Freidig
Lyn	1–3	Viking
Frigg	2–2 (a.e.t.)	Sarpsborg
Strømmen	3–2 (a.e.t.)	Brann
Kapp	2–5	Lillestrøm
Larvik Turn	7–0	Kristiansund
Pors	1–5	Skeid
Replay: 19 September 1954
Sarpsborg	3–0	Frigg

== Quarter-finals ==
Team 1	Score	Team 2
26 September 1954
Skeid	1–0	Lillestrøm
Viking	0–1	Larvik Turn
Fredrikstad	4–3	Strømmen
Sarpsborg	2–1	Sparta

== Semi-finals ==
Team 1	Score	Team 2
10 October 1954
Fredrikstad	3–0	Sarpsborg
Larvik Turn	2–2 (a.e.t.)	Skeid
Replay: 17 October 1954
Skeid	3–2	Larvik Turn

== Final ==
24 October 1954

Skeid	3–0	Fredrikstad
Hennum 53'; Nordahl 71'; Johansen 86'	Report

Ullevaal Stadion, Oslo
Attendance: 34,794
Referee: Finn Å. Bråthe (Lillestrøm)

Skeid:
Øivind Johannessen
Arne Winther
Knut Gudem
Jan Gulbrandsen
Leif Belgen
Finn Gundersen
Arvid Halvorsen
Hans Nordahl
Harald Hennum
Bernhard Johansen
Sverre Olsen

Fredrikstad:
Per Mosgaard
Kjell Jacobsen
Åge Spydevold
Reidar Kristiansen
Erik Holmberg
Leif Pedersen
Tore Nilsen
Arne Pedersen
Odd Aas
Henry Johannessen
Willy Olsen

== See also ==
- 1953–54 Norwegian Main League
- 1954 in Norwegian football
