= 1933 in Norwegian football =

Football in Norway
Men's football
- NM: Mjøndalen

Results from Norwegian football in 1933.

== Class A of local association leagues ==
Class A of local association leagues (kretsserier) is the predecessor of a national league competition.

| League | Champion |
|---|---|
| Østfold | Fredrikstad |
| Oslo | Vålerengen |
| Follo | Ski |
| Aker | Nydalen |
| Vestre Romerike | Eidsvold IF |
| Østre Romerike | Haga |
| Oplandene | Lyn (Gjøvik) |
| Glommendalen^{1} | Sander |
| Nord-Østerdal | Bergmann |
| Sør-Østerdal | Trysilgutten |
| Gudbrandsdal | Øyer |
| Valdres | Nordre Land |
| Røyken og Hurum | Roy |
| Øvre Buskerud | Liv |
| Drammen og omegn | Mjøndalen |
| Vestfold | Berger |
| Grenland | Odd |
| Øvre Telemark | Rjukan |
| Aust-Agder | Spring (Kragerø) |
| Vest-Agder | Vigør |
| Rogaland | Viking |
| Sunnhordaland | Stord |
| Midthordland | Voss |
| Bergen | Hardy |
| Sogn og Fjordane | Høyanger |
| Sunnmøre | Rollon |
| Nordmøre og Romsdal^{2} | Clausenengen |
| Sør-Trøndelag | Ranheim |
| Trondhjem | Kvik (Trondhjem) |
| Nord-Trøndelag | Neset |
| Namdal | Namsos |
| Helgeland | Sandnessjøen |
| Lofoten og Vesterålen | Glimt |
| Troms^{3} | Tromsø Turn |
| Finnmark^{4} | Kirkenes |

- ^{1}In the following season, Glommendalen local association changed its name to Glåmdal.
- ^{2}In the following season, Nordmøre og Romsdal local association was split into Nordmøre and Romsdal.
- ^{3}In the following season, Troms local association was split into Troms Innland and Troms.
- ^{4}In the following season, Finnmark local association was split into Vest-Finnmark, Midt-Finnmark and Aust-Finnmark.

== Norwegian Cup ==
=== Final ===
15 October 1933

| Mjøndalen | 3–1 | Viking |
|---|---|---|
| E. Andersen 10', 33'; S. Andersen 42' | Report | Kvammen 70' |

Ullevaal Stadion, Oslo
Attendance: 23,000
Referee: Eivind Johansen (Larvik Turn)

== Northern Norwegian Cup ==
=== Final ===
| Glimt | 2–0 | Mjølner |
|---|---|---|
| | Report |

== National team ==
| 28 May Friendly | Norway | 1–2 | Wales | Bergen, Norway |
| 13:00 (UTC+1); Match 94 | Helgesen 29' | Report | Jones 63'; W. Foulkes 71' (pen.) | Stadium: Brann Stadion; Attendance: 4,000; Referee: George Rudd (England) |

| 11 June 1933–36 Nordic Championship | Denmark | 2–2 | Norway | Copenhagen, Denmark |
| (UTC+1); Match 95 | Thielsen 14', 35' | Report | Pedersen 33', 37' | Stadium: Københavns Idrætspark; Attendance: 28,000; Referee: Ivan Eklind (Sweden) |

| 20 June Friendly | Norway | 4–2 | Hungary | Aker, Norway |
| 19:30 (UTC+1); Match 96 | Juve 3', 57'; Steen 38'; Hansen 85' | Report | Reiter 28'; Solti 75' (pen.) | Stadium: Ullevaal Stadion; Attendance: 12,000; Referee: Carl Olsson (Sweden) |

| 3 September 1933–36 Nordic Championship | Finland | 1–5 | Norway | Helsinki, Finland |
| (UTC+2); Match 97 | Åström 32' | Report | Juve 20', 36', 46'; Viinioksa 49' (o.g.); Hansen 83' | Stadium: Töölön Pallokenttä; Attendance: 6,271; Referee: Gustaf Ekberg (Sweden) |

| 24 September 1933–36 Nordic Championship | Norway | 0–1 | Sweden | Aker, Norway |
| 13:15 (UTC+1); Match 98 | | Report | Dunker 55' | Stadium: Ullevaal Stadion; Attendance: 33,000; Referee: Poul Yssing (Denmark) |

| 5 November Friendly | Germany | 2–2 | Norway | Magdeburg, Germany |
| 14:30 (UTC+1); Match 99 | Albrecht 8'; Hohmann 33' | Report | Kvammen 63'; Juve 68' | Stadium: Sportplatz am Gübser Damm; Attendance: 40,000; Referee: Joop van Moorsel (Netherlands) |
