= 1953 in Norwegian football =

Football in Norway
Men's football
- Hovedserien: Larvik Turn
- Landsdelsserien: Moss (Group East/South); Geithus (Group East/North); Flekkefjord (Group South/West A1); Djerv 1919 (Group South/West A2); Nordnes (Group South/West B); Langevåg (Group Møre); Freidig (Group Trøndelag)
- NM: Viking

Results from Norwegian football in 1953.

== 1952–53 league season ==
=== Hovedserien ===
==== Group A ====
Pos	Team	Pld	W	D	L	GF	GA	GD	Pts	Qualification or relegation
1	Skeid	14	10	3	1	48	10	+38	23	Qualification for the championship final
2	Fredrikstad	14	7	4	3	40	19	+21	18	
3	Sarpsborg FK	14	7	4	3	20	17	+3	18	
4	Viking	14	7	3	4	23	17	+6	17	
5	Strømmen	14	6	3	5	30	21	+9	15	
6	Varegg	14	3	2	9	16	39	−23	8	
7	Brann (R)	14	2	3	9	9	36	−27	7	Relegation
8	Årstad (R)	14	2	2	10	11	38	−27	6	Relegation

Source: RSSSF
(R) Relegated

==== Group B ====
Pos	Team	Pld	W	D	L	GF	GA	GD	Pts	Qualification or relegation
1	Larvik Turn (C)	14	10	2	2	44	11	+33	22	Qualification for the championship final
2	Asker	14	6	7	1	20	14	+6	19	
3	Lillestrøm	14	6	4	4	25	22	+3	16	
4	Sandefjord BK	14	6	3	5	25	32	−7	15	
5	Odd	14	5	3	6	34	30	+4	13	
6	Sparta	14	5	2	7	15	22	−7	12	
7	Lyn (R)	14	3	2	9	24	31	−7	8	Relegation
8	Ranheim (R)	14	3	1	10	12	37	−25	7	Relegation

Source: RSSSF
(C) Champions; (R) Relegated

==== Championship final ====
June 21: Larvik Turn - Skeid 3-2

=== Landsdelsserien ===
==== Group Østland/Søndre ====
Pos	Team	Pld	W	D	L	GF	GA	GD	Pts	Promotion or relegation
1	Moss (P)	14	8	4	2	35	18	+17	20	Promotion to Hovedserien
2	Fram	14	7	5	2	25	10	+15	19	
3	Lisleby	15	9	1	5	31	17	+14	19	
4	Pors	14	5	3	6	20	18	+2	13	
5	Snøgg	14	4	4	6	18	26	−8	12	
6	Selbak	14	5	1	8	16	28	−12	11	
7	Ørn	14	4	2	8	17	27	−10	10	
8	Herkules (R)	14	3	2	9	19	37	−18	8	Relegation to 3. divisjon

Source: rsssf.no
Rules for classification: 1) points; 2) goal difference; 3) number of goals scored.
(P) Promoted; (R) Relegated

==== Østland/Nordre ====
Pos	Team	Pld	W	D	L	GF	GA	GD	Pts	Promotion or relegation
1	Geithus (P)	14	9	3	2	33	17	+16	21	Promotion to Hovedserien
2	Vålerengen	14	10	0	4	44	27	+17	20	
3	Kapp	14	9	1	4	51	33	+18	19	
4	Solberg	14	9	1	4	33	27	+6	19	
5	Frigg	14	5	2	7	29	26	+3	12	
6	Hamarkameratene	14	5	1	8	23	32	−9	11	
7	Drafn (R)	14	3	0	11	26	38	−12	6	Relegation to 3. divisjon
8	Jevnaker (R)	14	1	2	11	19	58	−39	4	Relegation to 3. divisjon

Source: rsssf.no
Rules for classification: 1) points; 2) goal difference; 3) number of goals scored.
(P) Promoted; (R) Relegated

==== Group Sørland/Vestland, A1 ====
Pos	Team	Pld	W	D	L	GF	GA	GD	Pts	Qualification or relegation
1	Flekkefjord	12	9	2	1	45	15	+30	20	Qualification for the promotion play-offs
2	Sørfjell	12	6	4	2	30	16	+14	16	
3	Jerv	12	5	1	6	30	21	+9	11	
4	Start	12	3	5	4	18	18	0	11	
5	Donn	12	4	3	5	18	28	−10	11	
6	Trauma	12	3	2	7	16	36	−20	8	
7	Mandalskameratene (R)	12	3	1	8	16	39	−23	7	Relegation to 3. divisjon

Source: rsssf.no
Rules for classification: 1) points; 2) goal difference; 3) number of goals scored.
(R) Relegated

==== Group Sørland/Vestland, A2 ====
Pos	Team	Pld	W	D	L	GF	GA	GD	Pts	Qualification or relegation
1	Djerv 1919	14	10	2	2	30	14	+16	22	Qualification for the promotion play-offs
2	Bryne	14	8	3	3	34	19	+15	19	
3	Ålgård	14	6	5	3	29	17	+12	17	
4	Vard	14	6	4	4	24	23	+1	16	
5	Nærbø	14	5	4	5	25	33	−8	14	
6	Stavanger	14	5	3	6	32	27	+5	13	
7	Ulf (R)	14	1	6	7	15	31	−16	8	Relegation to 3. divisjon
8	Klepp (R)	14	1	1	12	17	42	−25	3	Relegation to 3. divisjon

Source: rsssf.no
Rules for classification: 1) points; 2) goal difference; 3) number of goals scored.
(R) Relegated

==== Group Sørland/Vestland, B ====
Pos	Team	Pld	W	D	L	GF	GA	GD	Pts	Qualification or relegation
1	Nordnes (O, P)	12	7	5	0	19	8	+11	19	Qualification for the promotion play-offs
2	Os	12	6	3	3	26	14	+12	15	
3	Djerv	12	5	4	3	26	13	+13	14	
4	Baune	12	5	3	4	16	14	+2	13	
5	Voss	12	4	3	5	17	16	+1	11	
6	Hardy (R)	12	2	3	7	9	31	−22	7	Relegation to 3. divisjon
7	Nymark (R)	12	2	1	9	12	29	−17	5	Relegation to 3. divisjon

Source: rsssf.no
Rules for classification: 1) points; 2) goal difference; 3) number of goals scored.
(O) Play-off winners; (P) Promoted; (R) Relegated

==== Group Møre ====
Pos	Team	Pld	W	D	L	GF	GA	GD	Pts	Qualification or relegation
1	Langevåg	14	10	3	1	49	22	+27	23	Qualification for the promotion play-offs
2	Molde	14	9	1	4	40	23	+17	19	
3	Aalesund	14	7	4	3	35	24	+11	18	
4	Kristiansund	14	7	3	4	34	24	+10	17	
5	Hødd	14	5	3	6	36	29	+7	13	
6	Ørsta	14	4	4	6	24	41	−17	12	
7	Clausenengen (R)	14	4	1	9	29	35	−6	9	Relegation to 3. divisjon
8	Træff (R)	14	0	1	13	5	54	−49	1	Relegation to 3. divisjon

Source: rsssf.no
Rules for classification: 1) points; 2) goal difference; 3) number of goals scored.
(R) Relegated

==== Group Trøndelag ====
Pos	Team	Pld	W	D	L	GF	GA	GD	Pts	Qualification or relegation
1	Freidig (O, P)	14	9	2	3	42	23	+19	20	Qualification for the promotion play-offs
2	Falken	14	8	2	4	27	22	+5	18	
3	Steinkjer	14	7	2	5	33	26	+7	16	
4	Kvik	14	5	6	3	24	19	+5	16	
5	Brage	14	5	4	5	25	31	−6	14	
6	Neset	14	3	6	5	25	29	−4	12	
7	Nessegutten (R)	14	2	5	7	17	29	−12	9	Relegation to 3. divisjon
8	National (R)	14	3	1	10	18	32	−14	7	Relegation to 3. divisjon

Source: rsssf.no
Rules for classification: 1) points; 2) goal difference; 3) number of goals scored.
(O) Play-off winners; (P) Promoted; (R) Relegated

==== Promotion play-offs ====
===== Sørland/Vestland =====
Flekkefjord - Djerv 1919 3-2

Flekkefjord - Nordnes 2-2 (extra time)

Flekkefjord - Nordnes 2-3

Nordnes promoted.

===== Møre/Trøndelag =====
Langevåg - Freidig 0-1

Freidig promoted.

=== First Division ===
==== District I ====
1. Askim (Promoted)
2. Greåker
3. Mysen
4. Rapid
5. Sprint
6. Østsiden
7. Rakkestad
8. Kvik (Halden)

==== District II, Group A ====
1. Sagene (Play-off)
2. Drammens BK
3. Stabæk
4. Kongsberg
5. Strømsgodset
6. Mjøndalen
7. Nydalen
8. Mercantile/Trygg

==== District II, Group B ====
1. Sandaker (Play-off)
2. Aurskog
3. Spartacus
4. Aasen
5. Grei
6. Bjørkelangen
7. Kjelsås
8. Raumnes/Årnes

==== District III ====
1. Raufoss (Play-off)
2. Gjøvik/Lyn
3. Hamar IL
4. Vang
5. Mesna
6. Vardal
7. Fremad
8. Biri

==== District IV, Group A ====
1. Eik (Play-off)
2. Tønsberg Turn
3. Kragerø
4. Urædd
5. Flint
6. Skiens-Grane
7. Runar
8. Teie

==== District IV, Group B ====
1. Skiens BK (Play-off)
2. Borg
3. Storm
4. Ulefoss
5. Brevik
6. Rjukan
7. Skade
8. Stag

==== District V, Group A1 (Aust-Agder) ====
1. Arendals BK (Play-off)
2. Grane (Arendal)
3. Nedenes
4. Risør
5. Rygene

==== District V, Group A2 (Vest-Agder) ====
1. AIK Lund (Play-off)
2. Vigør
3. Vindbjart
4. Bakke
5. Farsund
6. Våg

==== District V, Group B1 (Rogaland) ====
1. Buøy (Promoted)
2. Jarl
3. Varhaug
4. Vidar
5. Vigrestad
6. Orre

==== District V, Group B2 (Rogaland) ====
1. Kopervik (Promoted)
2. Haugar
3. Randaberg
4. Torvastad
5. Brodd
6. Pol

==== District VI, Group A (Bergen) ====
1. Fjellkameratene (Play-off)
2. Minde
3. Laksevåg
4. Bergens-Sparta
5. Sandviken
6. Trane
7. Frøya

==== District VI, Group B (Midthordland) ====
1. Dale (Dalekvam) (Play-off)
2. Florvåg
3. Fana
4. Erdal
5. Eidsvåg (Åsane)
6. Kjøkkelvik
7. Søfteland

==== District VII, Group A (Sunnmøre/Romsdal) ====
1. Rollon (Promoted)
2. Spjelkavik
3. Sykkylven
4. Åndalsnes
5. Skarbøvik
6. Volda
7. Isfjorden

==== District VII, Group B (Nordmøre/Romsdal) ====
1. Halsa (Promoted)
2. Braatt
3. Nordlandet
4. Goma
5. Sunndal
6. Averøykam.
7. Eide
8. Framtid

==== District VIII, Group A1 (Sør-Trøndelag) ====
1. Hommelvik (Play-off)
2. Heimdal
3. Melhus
4. Flå
5. Leik
6. Hovin

==== District VIII, Group A2 (Sør-Trøndelag) ====
1. Løkken (Play-off)
2. Orkanger
3. Troll
4. Svorkmo
5. Oppdal
6. Kyrksæterøra

==== District VIII, Group B (Trondheim og omegn) ====
1. Wing (Play-off)
2. Rosenborg
3. Nidar
4. Tryggkameratene
5. Trond
6. Ørn (Trondheim)

==== District VIII, Group C (Fosen) ====
1. Opphaug (Play-off)
2. Lensvik
3. Stadsbygd
4. Fevåg
5. Beian
6. Uthaug

==== District VIII, Group D (Nord-Trøndelag) ====
1. Sverre (Play-off)
2. Verdal
3. Stjørdal
4. Malm
5. Blink
6. Skogn

==== Play-off District II/III ====
Raufoss - Sandaker 0-0

Sandaker - Sagene 2-5

Sagene - Raufoss 2-1

==== Final table ====
Pos	Team	Pld	W	D	L	GF	GA	GD	Pts	Promotion
1	Sagene	2	2	0	0	7	3	+4	4	Promoted
2	Raufoss	2	0	1	1	1	2	−1	1	Promoted
3	Sandaker	2	0	1	1	2	5	−3	1	

==== Championship District II ====
Sandaker - Sagene 2-5

==== Play-off District IV ====
Eik - Skiens BK 6-1

Skiens BK - Eik 2-1 (agg. 3–7)

Eik promoted.

==== Play-off District V, Group A ====
AIK Lund - Arendals BK 3-2

Arendals BK - AIK Lund 0-1 (agg. 2–4)

AIK Lund promoted.

==== Championship District V, Group B ====
Buøy - Kopervik?

Kopervik - Buøy 6-1 (in Egersund)

==== Play-off District VI ====
Fjellkameratene - Dale 5-2

Dale - Fjellkameratene 2-1 (agg. 4–6)

Fjellkameratene promoted.

==== Championship District VII ====
Rollon - Halsa 3-3 (extra time)

Rollon - Halsa 0-1 (in Molde)

==== Championship District VIII ====
Hommelvik - Løkken?

Sverre - Wing 0-2

Opphaug - Løkken 0-1

Wing - Opphaug 2-3

Løkken - Sverre 2-9

Løkken - Wing 0-3

Opphaug - Sverre 1-7

==== Final Table District VIII ====
Pos	Team	Pld	W	D	L	GF	GA	GD	Pts	Promotion
1	Sverre	3	2	0	1	16	5	+11	4	Promoted
2	Wing	3	2	0	1	7	3	+4	4	Promoted
3	Opphaug	3	1	0	2	4	10	−6	2	
4	Løkken	3	1	0	2	3	12	−9	2	

== Norwegian Cup ==
=== Final ===
25 October 1953

Viking	2–1	Lillestrøm
Kindervåg 24'; Ingvaldsen 70'	Report	Borgersen 80'

Ullevaal Stadion, Oslo
Attendance: 31,102
Referee: Øivind Helgesen (Liull)

== Northern Norwegian Cup ==
=== Final ===
Harstad	4–1	Mjølner
	Report

== National team ==
Date	Venue	Opponent	Res.*	Competition	Norwegian goalscorers
May 19	Oslo	England	1–1	Friendly	Tor Jevne
June 24	Bislett Stadion, Oslo	Saar	2–3	WCQ	Gunnar Thoresen, Knut Dahlen
August 13	Bergen	Iceland	3–1	Friendly	Kjell Kristiansen, Gunnar Dybwad, Gunnar Thoresen
August 19	Oslo	West Germany	1–1	WCQ	Harald Hennum
August 30	Helsinki	Finland	4–1	Friendly	Pål Angell-Hansen, Gunnar Thoresen (2), Harald Hennum
September 13	Oslo	Denmark	0–1	Friendly	
September 27	Oslo	Netherlands	4–0	Friendly	Gunnar Thoresen (2), Gunnar Dybwad, Hans Nordahl
October 18	Stockholm	Sweden	0–0	Friendly	
November 8	Saarbrücken	Saar	0–0	WCQ	
November 22	Hamburg	West Germany	1–5	WCQ	Hans Nordahl

Note: Norway's goals first
Explanation:

- WCQ = 1954 FIFA World Cup Qualifier
