= 1954 in Norwegian football =

Football in Norway
Men's football
- Hovedserien: Fredrikstad
- Landsdelsserien: Fram (Group East/South); Vålerengen (Group East/North); Flekkefjord (Group South/West A1); Brann (Group South/West A2); Varegg (Group South/West B); Molde (Group Møre); Ranheim (Group Trøndelag)
- NM: Skeid

The 1954 season was the 49th season of competitive football in Norway.

== 1953–54 league season ==
=== Hovedserien ===
==== Group A ====
| Pos | Team | Pld | W | D | L | GF | GA | GD | Pts | Qualification or relegation |
|---|---|---|---|---|---|---|---|---|---|---|
| 1 | Skeid | 14 | 10 | 3 | 1 | 48 | 10 | +38 | 23 | Qualification for the championship final |
| 2 | Fredrikstad | 14 | 7 | 4 | 3 | 40 | 19 | +21 | 18 | |
| 3 | Sarpsborg FK | 14 | 7 | 4 | 3 | 20 | 17 | +3 | 18 | |
| 4 | Viking | 14 | 7 | 3 | 4 | 23 | 17 | +6 | 17 | |
| 5 | Strømmen | 14 | 6 | 3 | 5 | 30 | 21 | +9 | 15 | |
| 6 | Varegg | 14 | 3 | 2 | 9 | 16 | 39 | −23 | 8 | |
| 7 | Brann (R) | 14 | 2 | 3 | 9 | 9 | 36 | −27 | 7 | Relegation |
| 8 | Årstad (R) | 14 | 2 | 2 | 10 | 11 | 38 | −27 | 6 | Relegation |

Source: RSSSF
(R) Relegated

==== Group B ====
| Pos | Team | Pld | W | D | L | GF | GA | GD | Pts | Qualification or relegation |
|---|---|---|---|---|---|---|---|---|---|---|
| 1 | Larvik Turn (C) | 14 | 10 | 2 | 2 | 44 | 11 | +33 | 22 | Qualification for the championship final |
| 2 | Asker | 14 | 6 | 7 | 1 | 20 | 14 | +6 | 19 | |
| 3 | Lillestrøm | 14 | 6 | 4 | 4 | 25 | 22 | +3 | 16 | |
| 4 | Sandefjord BK | 14 | 6 | 3 | 5 | 25 | 32 | −7 | 15 | |
| 5 | Odd | 14 | 5 | 3 | 6 | 34 | 30 | +4 | 13 | |
| 6 | Sparta | 14 | 5 | 2 | 7 | 15 | 22 | −7 | 12 | |
| 7 | Lyn (R) | 14 | 3 | 2 | 9 | 24 | 31 | −7 | 8 | Relegation |
| 8 | Ranheim (R) | 14 | 3 | 1 | 10 | 12 | 37 | −25 | 7 | Relegation |

Source: RSSSF
(C) Champions; (R) Relegated

==== Championship final ====
June 27: Fredrikstad-Skeid 2-1

=== Landsdelsserien ===
==== Group Østland/Søndre ====
| Pos | Team | Pld | W | D | L | GF | GA | GD | Pts | Promotion or relegation |
|---|---|---|---|---|---|---|---|---|---|---|
| 1 | Fram (P) | 14 | 9 | 2 | 3 | 33 | 16 | +17 | 20 | Promotion to Hovedserien |
| 2 | Eik | 14 | 9 | 0 | 5 | 31 | 22 | +9 | 18 | |
| 3 | Pors | 14 | 8 | 1 | 5 | 32 | 29 | +3 | 17 | |
| 4 | Ørn | 14 | 7 | 3 | 4 | 25 | 23 | +2 | 17 | |
| 5 | Snøgg | 14 | 5 | 4 | 5 | 20 | 24 | −4 | 14 | |
| 6 | Askim | 14 | 5 | 1 | 8 | 22 | 24 | −2 | 11 | |
| 7 | Selbak (R) | 14 | 3 | 3 | 8 | 19 | 26 | −7 | 9 | Relegation to 3. divisjon |
| 8 | Lisleby (R) | 14 | 2 | 2 | 10 | 18 | 36 | −18 | 6 | Relegation to 3. divisjon |

Source: rsssf.no
Rules for classification: 1) points; 2) goal difference; 3) number of goals scored.
(P) Promoted; (R) Relegated

==== Group Østland/Nordre ====
| Pos | Team | Pld | W | D | L | GF | GA | GD | Pts | Promotion or relegation |
|---|---|---|---|---|---|---|---|---|---|---|
| 1 | Vålerengen (P) | 14 | 8 | 5 | 1 | 31 | 11 | +20 | 21 | Promotion to Hovedserien |
| 2 | Kapp | 14 | 8 | 3 | 3 | 37 | 25 | +12 | 19 | |
| 3 | Lyn | 14 | 8 | 2 | 4 | 30 | 15 | +15 | 18 | |
| 4 | Frigg | 14 | 4 | 6 | 4 | 23 | 23 | 0 | 14 | |
| 5 | Hamarkameratene | 14 | 3 | 6 | 5 | 16 | 31 | −15 | 12 | |
| 6 | Raufoss | 14 | 4 | 3 | 7 | 25 | 30 | −5 | 11 | |
| 7 | Sagene (R) | 14 | 3 | 3 | 8 | 24 | 32 | −8 | 9 | Relegation to 3. divisjon |
| 8 | Solberg (R) | 14 | 1 | 6 | 7 | 22 | 41 | −19 | 8 | Relegation to 3. divisjon |

Source: rsssf.no
Rules for classification: 1) points; 2) goal difference; 3) number of goals scored.
(P) Promoted; (R) Relegated

==== Group Sørland/Vestland, A1 ====
| Pos | Team | Pld | W | D | L | GF | GA | GD | Pts | Qualification or relegation |
|---|---|---|---|---|---|---|---|---|---|---|
| 1 | Flekkefjord | 12 | 10 | 2 | 0 | 49 | 6 | +43 | 22 | Qualification for the promotion play-offs |
| 2 | Start | 12 | 6 | 3 | 3 | 36 | 14 | +22 | 15 | |
| 3 | Jerv | 12 | 5 | 3 | 4 | 20 | 15 | +5 | 13 | |
| 4 | Donn | 12 | 4 | 4 | 4 | 23 | 26 | −3 | 12 | |
| 5 | AIK Lund | 12 | 4 | 3 | 5 | 20 | 30 | −10 | 11 | |
| 6 | Sørfjell | 12 | 3 | 2 | 7 | 12 | 33 | −21 | 8 | |
| 7 | Trauma (R) | 12 | 1 | 1 | 10 | 8 | 44 | −36 | 3 | Relegation to 3. divisjon |

Source: rsssf.no
Rules for classification: 1) points; 2) goal difference; 3) number of goals scored.
(R) Relegated

==== Group Sørland/Vestland, A2 ====
| Pos | Team | Pld | W | D | L | GF | GA | GD | Pts | Qualification or relegation |
|---|---|---|---|---|---|---|---|---|---|---|
| 1 | Bryne | 14 | 8 | 5 | 1 | 45 | 18 | +27 | 21 | Qualification for the promotion play-offs |
| 2 | Ålgård | 14 | 9 | 1 | 4 | 24 | 17 | +7 | 19 | |
| 3 | Djerv 1919 | 14 | 5 | 5 | 4 | 27 | 26 | +1 | 15 | |
| 4 | Stavanger | 14 | 5 | 4 | 5 | 28 | 23 | +5 | 14 | |
| 5 | Vard | 14 | 6 | 2 | 6 | 31 | 29 | +2 | 14 | |
| 6 | Nærbø | 14 | 4 | 4 | 6 | 17 | 30 | −13 | 12 | |
| 7 | Buøy (R) | 14 | 5 | 1 | 8 | 22 | 31 | −9 | 11 | Relegation to 3. divisjon |
| 8 | Kopervik (R) | 14 | 1 | 4 | 9 | 11 | 31 | −20 | 6 | Relegation to 3. divisjon |

Source: rsssf.no
Rules for classification: 1) points; 2) goal difference; 3) number of goals scored.
(R) Relegated

==== Group Sørland/Vestland, B ====
| Pos | Team | Pld | W | D | L | GF | GA | GD | Pts | Qualification or relegation |
|---|---|---|---|---|---|---|---|---|---|---|
| 1 | Brann (O, P) | 12 | 9 | 3 | 0 | 40 | 8 | +32 | 21 | Qualification for the promotion play-offs |
| 2 | Årstad | 12 | 6 | 3 | 3 | 23 | 19 | +4 | 15 | |
| 3 | Baune | 12 | 5 | 3 | 4 | 21 | 19 | +2 | 13 | |
| 4 | Djerv | 12 | 4 | 3 | 5 | 15 | 21 | −6 | 11 | |
| 5 | Os | 12 | 3 | 3 | 6 | 22 | 26 | −4 | 9 | |
| 6 | Voss (R) | 12 | 4 | 1 | 7 | 14 | 25 | −11 | 9 | Relegation to 3. divisjon |
| 7 | Fjell-Kameraterne (R) | 12 | 2 | 2 | 8 | 17 | 34 | −17 | 6 | Relegation to 3. divisjon |

Source: rsssf.no
Rules for classification: 1) points; 2) goal difference; 3) number of goals scored.
(O) Play-off winners; (P) Promoted; (R) Relegated

==== Group Møre ====
| Pos | Team | Pld | W | D | L | GF | GA | GD | Pts | Qualification or relegation |
|---|---|---|---|---|---|---|---|---|---|---|
| 1 | Molde | 14 | 10 | 3 | 1 | 43 | 13 | +30 | 23 | Qualification for the promotion play-offs |
| 2 | Kristiansund | 14 | 9 | 2 | 3 | 44 | 22 | +22 | 20 | |
| 3 | Aalesund | 14 | 9 | 2 | 3 | 32 | 17 | +15 | 20 | |
| 4 | Langevåg | 14 | 6 | 3 | 5 | 42 | 26 | +16 | 15 | |
| 5 | Hødd | 14 | 5 | 3 | 6 | 35 | 28 | +7 | 13 | |
| 6 | Rollon | 13 | 2 | 4 | 7 | 17 | 38 | −21 | 8 | |
| 7 | Ørsta (R) | 14 | 1 | 4 | 9 | 14 | 40 | −26 | 6 | Relegation to 3. divisjon |
| 8 | Halsa (R) | 14 | 2 | 2 | 10 | 17 | 60 | −43 | 6 | Relegation to 3. divisjon |

Source: rsssf.no
Rules for classification: 1) points; 2) goal difference; 3) number of goals scored.
(R) Relegated

==== Group Trøndelag ====
| Pos | Team | Pld | W | D | L | GF | GA | GD | Pts | Qualification or relegation |
|---|---|---|---|---|---|---|---|---|---|---|
| 1 | Ranheim (O, P) | 14 | 10 | 3 | 1 | 35 | 12 | +23 | 23 | Qualification for the promotion play-offs |
| 2 | Kvik | 14 | 8 | 1 | 5 | 24 | 25 | −1 | 17 | |
| 3 | Sverre | 14 | 7 | 2 | 5 | 37 | 28 | +9 | 16 | |
| 4 | Steinkjer | 14 | 7 | 2 | 5 | 28 | 26 | +2 | 16 | |
| 5 | Brage | 14 | 5 | 4 | 5 | 35 | 30 | +5 | 14 | |
| 6 | Falken | 14 | 4 | 4 | 6 | 26 | 23 | +3 | 12 | |
| 7 | Neset | 14 | 3 | 2 | 9 | 19 | 47 | −28 | 8 | |
| 8 | Wing (R) | 14 | 1 | 4 | 9 | 14 | 27 | −13 | 6 | Relegation to 3. divisjon |

Source: rsssf.no
Rules for classification: 1) points; 2) goal difference; 3) number of goals scored.
(O) Play-off winners; (P) Promoted; (R) Relegated

==== Play-off Sørland/Vestland ====
Flekkefjord - Bryne 1-0

Brann - Flekkefjord 6-0 (agg. 7–0)

Brann promoted.

==== Play-off Møre/Trøndelag ====
Ranheim - Molde 2-0

Ranheim promoted.

=== First Division ===
==== District I ====
1. Rapid (Promoted)
2. Greåker
3. Torp
4. Hafslund
5. Mysen
6. Sprint
7. Østsiden
8. Rakkestad

==== District II; Group A ====
1. Vestfossen (Play-off)
2. Drammens BK
3. Mjøndalen
4. Drafn
5. Steinberg
6. Jevnaker
7. Strømsgodset
8. Kongsberg

==== District II, Group B ====
1. Spartacus (Play-off)
2. Aurskog
3. Sandaker
4. Stabæk
5. Aasen
6. Grei
7. Kongsvinger
8. Funnefoss

==== District III ====
1. Gjøvik/Lyn (Play-off)
2. Hamar IL
3. Fremad
4. Brumunddal
5. Mesna
6. Vang
7. Vardal
8. Einastrand

==== District IV, Group A ====
1. Tønsberg Turn (Play-off)
2. Skiens BK
3. Borre
4. Sem
5. Kragerø
6. Brevik
7. Borg
8. Flint

==== District IV, Group B ====
1. Storm (Play-off)
2. Herkules
3. Urædd
4. Rjukan
5. Drangedal
6. Ulefoss
7. Tollnes
8. Skiens-Grane

==== District V, Group A1 (Aust-Agder) ====
1. Grane (Arendal) (Play-off)
2. Arendals BK
3. Nedenes
4. Rygene
5. Risør
6. Dristug

==== District V, Group A2 (Vest-Agder) ====
1. Mandalskam. (Play-off)
2. Vigør
3. Farsund
4. Torridal
5. Vindbjart

==== DistrictV, Group B1 (Rogaland) ====
1. Ulf (Promoted)
2. Klepp
3. Egersund
4. Varhaug
5. Randaberg
6. Vigrestad

==== District V, Group B2 (Rogaland) ====
1. Vidar (Promoted)
2. Haugar
3. Jarl
4. Torvastad
5. Vaulen
6. Brodd

==== District VI, Group A (Bergen) ====
1. Nymark (Play-off)
2. Laksevåg
3. Hardy
4. Trane
5. Bergens-Sparta
6. Viggo
7. Minde

==== District VI, Group B (Midthordland) ====
1. Florvåg (Play-off)
2. Erdal
3. Fana
4. Ålvik
5. Eidsvåg (Åsane)
6. Dale (Dalekvam) 
7. Kjøkkelvik

==== District VII, Group A (Sunnmøre/Romsdal) ====
1. Sykkylven (Promoted)
2. Spjelkavik
3. Aksla
4. Hovdebygda
5. Skarbøvik
6. Volda
7. Velledalen
8. Åndalsnes

==== District VII, Group B (Nordmøre/Romsdal) ====
1. Clausenengen (Promoted)
2. Braatt
3. Træff
4. Goma
5. Nordlandet
6. Averøykam.
7. Sunndal
8. Olymp

==== District VIII, Group A1 (Sør-Trøndelag) ====
1. Hommelvik (Play-off)
2. Heimdal
3. Steinar
4. Leik
5. Flå
6. Melhus

==== District VIII, Group A2 (Sør-Trøndelag) ====
1. Troll (Play-off)
2. Orkanger
3. Løkken
4. Svorkmo
5. Dalguten
6. Oppdal

==== District VIII, Group B (Trondheim og omegn) ====
1. Rosenborg (Play-off)
2. Tryggkameratene
3. National
4. Nidar
5. Trond
6. Ørn (Trondheim)
7. Strindheim

==== District VIII, Group C (Fosen) ====
1. Opphaug (Play-off)
2. Beian
3. Stadsbygd
4. Lensvik
5. Rissa
6. Fevåg (withdrew)

==== District VIII, Group D (Nord-Trøndelag/Namdal) ====
1. Nessegutten 
2. Verdal (Play-off)
3. Stjørdal
4. Malm
5. Namsos
6. Varden (Meråker)
7. Skogn
8. Blink

==== Play-off District II/III ====
Spartacus - Vestfossen 1-2

Vestfossen - Gjøvik/Lyn 2-2

Gjøvik/Lyn - Spartacus 1-1

==== Table ====
| Pos | Team | Pld | W | D | L | GF | GA | GD | Pts | Promotion or relegation |
|---|---|---|---|---|---|---|---|---|---|---|
| 1 | Vestfossen | 2 | 1 | 1 | 0 | 4 | 3 | +1 | 3 | Promoted |
| 2 | Gjøvik/Lyn | 2 | 0 | 2 | 0 | 3 | 3 | 0 | 2 | Promoted |
| 3 | Spartacus | 2 | 0 | 1 | 1 | 2 | 3 | −1 | 1 | |

==== Championship District II ====
Spartacus - Vestfossen 1-2

==== Play-off District IV ====
Tønsberg Turn - Storm 2-0

Storm - Tønsberg Turn 0-1 (agg. 0–3)

Tønsberg Turn promoted.

==== Play-off District V ====
Grane - Mandalskameratene 3-0

Mandalskameratene - Grane 1-1 (agg. 1–4)

Grane (Arendal) promoted.

==== Championship District V ====
Ulf - Vidar 2-0

Vidar - Ulf 1-5 (agg. 1–7)

Grane - Ulf 0-2 (in Flekkefjord)

==== Play-off District VI ====
Nymark - Florvåg 2-1

Nymark promoted.

==== Championship District VIII ====
Sykkylven - Clausenengen 3-0 (in Molde)

==== Play-off District VIII ====
Rosenborg - Verdal 1-0

Hommelvik - Opphaug 2-1

Verdal - Hommelvik 3-0

Opphaug - Rosenborg 0-3

Rosenborg - Hommelvik 1-2

Verdal - Opphaug 7-0

==== Relegation play-off District II ====
Grei - Jevnaker 1-3

Jevnaker - Grei 2-1 (agg. 5–2)

Grei relegated.

==== Relegation play-off District IV ====
Borg - Tollnes 3-2

Tollnes relegated.

== Norwegian Cup ==
=== Final ===
24 October 1954

| Skeid | 3–0 | Fredrikstad |
|---|---|---|
| Hennum 53'; Nordahl 71'; Johansen 71' | Report |

Ullevaal Stadion, Oslo
Attendance: 34,794
Referee: Finn Å. Bråthe (Lillestrøm)

== Northern Norwegian Cup ==
=== Final ===
| Harstad | 4–0 | Narvik/Nor |
|---|---|---|
| | Report |

== National team ==
| Date | Venue | Opponent | Res.* | Competition | Norwegian goalscorers |
|---|---|---|---|---|---|
| May 5 | Glasgow | Scotland | 0–1 | Friendly | |
| May 19 | Oslo | Scotland | 1–1 | Friendly | Harry Kure |
| May 30 | Wien | Austria | 0–5 | Friendly | |
| June 4 | Malmö | Denmark | 2–1 | Friendly | Harry Kure, Per Ljostveit |
| June 7 | Stockholm | Sweden | 0–3 | Friendly | |
| July 4 | Reykjavík | Iceland | 0–1 | Friendly | |
| August 29 | Oslo | Finland | 3–1 | Friendly | Henry Johannessen, Gunnar Dybwad, Harald Hennum |
| September 19 | Oslo | Sweden | 1–1 | Friendly | Reidar Sundby |
| October 31 | Copenhagen | Denmark | 1–0 | Friendly | Harald Hennum |
| November 8 | Dublin | Republic of Ireland | 1–2 | Friendly | Willy Olsen |

Note: Norway's goals first
