= Tore Nilsen =

Tore Nilsen may refer to:

- Tore Nilsen (footballer, born 1933)
- Tore Nilsen (footballer, born 1960) (born 1960), Norwegian football defender
- Tore Falch Nilsen (1948–2008), Norwegian ice hockey player
