= 1952–53 Landsdelsserien =

Landsdelsserien
- Season: 1952–53
- Promoted: Moss; Geithus; Nordnes; Freidig
- Relegated: Herkules; Drafn; Jevnaker; Mandalskameratene; Ulf; Klepp; Hardy; Nymark; Clausenengen; Træff; Nessegutten; National

The 1952–53 Landsdelsserien was a Norwegian second-tier football league season.

The league was contested by 54 teams, divided into a total of seven groups from four districts; Østland/Søndre, Østland/Nordre, Sørland/Vestre and Møre/Trøndelag. The two group winners in the Østland districts, Moss and Geithus promoted directly to the 1953–54 Hovedserien. The other five group winners qualified for promotion play-offs to compete for two spots in the following season's top flight. Nordnes and Freidig won the play-offs and were promoted.

== Tables ==
=== District Østland/Søndre ===
Pos	Team	Pld	W	D	L	GF	GA	GD	Pts	Promotion or relegation
1	Moss (P)	14	8	4	2	35	18	+17	20	Promotion to Hovedserien
2	Fram	14	7	5	2	25	10	+15	19	
3	Lisleby	15	9	1	5	31	17	+14	19	
4	Pors	14	5	3	6	20	18	+2	13	
5	Snøgg	14	4	4	6	18	26	−8	12	
6	Selbak	14	5	1	8	16	28	−12	11	
7	Ørn	14	4	2	8	17	27	−10	10	
8	Herkules (R)	14	3	2	9	19	37	−18	8	Relegation to 3. divisjon

Source: rsssf.no
Rules for classification: 1) points; 2) goal difference; 3) number of goals scored.
(P) Promoted; (R) Relegated

=== District Østland/Nordre ===
Pos	Team	Pld	W	D	L	GF	GA	GD	Pts	Promotion or relegation
1	Geithus (P)	14	9	3	2	33	17	+16	21	Promotion to Hovedserien
2	Vålerengen	14	10	0	4	44	27	+17	20	
3	Kapp	14	9	1	4	51	33	+18	19	
4	Solberg	14	9	1	4	33	27	+6	19	
5	Frigg	14	5	2	7	29	26	+3	12	
6	Hamarkameratene	14	5	1	8	23	32	−9	11	
7	Drafn (R)	14	3	0	11	26	38	−12	6	Relegation to 3. divisjon
8	Jevnaker (R)	14	1	2	11	19	58	−39	4	Relegation to 3. divisjon

Source: rsssf.no
Rules for classification: 1) points; 2) goal difference; 3) number of goals scored.
(P) Promoted; (R) Relegated

=== District Sørland/Vestland ===
==== Group A1 ====
Pos	Team	Pld	W	D	L	GF	GA	GD	Pts	Qualification or relegation
1	Flekkefjord	12	9	2	1	45	15	+30	20	Qualification for the promotion play-offs
2	Sørfjell	12	6	4	2	30	16	+14	16	
3	Jerv	12	5	1	6	30	21	+9	11	
4	Start	12	3	5	4	18	18	0	11	
5	Donn	12	4	3	5	18	28	−10	11	
6	Trauma	12	3	2	7	16	36	−20	8	
7	Mandalskameratene (R)	12	3	1	8	16	39	−23	7	Relegation to 3. divisjon

Source: rsssf.no
Rules for classification: 1) points; 2) goal difference; 3) number of goals scored.
(R) Relegated

==== Group A2 ====
Pos	Team	Pld	W	D	L	GF	GA	GD	Pts	Qualification or relegation
1	Djerv 1919	14	10	2	2	30	14	+16	22	Qualification for the promotion play-offs
2	Bryne	14	8	3	3	34	19	+15	19	
3	Ålgård	14	6	5	3	29	17	+12	17	
4	Vard	14	6	4	4	24	23	+1	16	
5	Nærbø	14	5	4	5	25	33	−8	14	
6	Stavanger	14	5	3	6	32	27	+5	13	
7	Ulf (R)	14	1	6	7	15	31	−16	8	Relegation to 3. divisjon
8	Klepp (R)	14	1	1	12	17	42	−25	3	Relegation to 3. divisjon

Source: rsssf.no
Rules for classification: 1) points; 2) goal difference; 3) number of goals scored.
(R) Relegated

==== Group B ====
Pos	Team	Pld	W	D	L	GF	GA	GD	Pts	Qualification or relegation
1	Nordnes (O, P)	12	7	5	0	19	8	+11	19	Qualification for the promotion play-offs
2	Os	12	6	3	3	26	14	+12	15	
3	Djerv	12	5	4	3	26	13	+13	14	
4	Baune	12	5	3	4	16	14	+2	13	
5	Voss	12	4	3	5	17	16	+1	11	
6	Hardy (R)	12	2	3	7	9	31	−22	7	Relegation to 3. divisjon
7	Nymark (R)	12	2	1	9	12	29	−17	5	Relegation to 3. divisjon

Source: rsssf.no
Rules for classification: 1) points; 2) goal difference; 3) number of goals scored.
(O) Play-off winners; (P) Promoted; (R) Relegated

=== District Møre/Trøndelag ===
==== Møre ====
Pos	Team	Pld	W	D	L	GF	GA	GD	Pts	Qualification or relegation
1	Langevåg	14	10	3	1	49	22	+27	23	Qualification for the promotion play-offs
2	Molde	14	9	1	4	40	23	+17	19	
3	Aalesund	14	7	4	3	35	24	+11	18	
4	Kristiansund	14	7	3	4	34	24	+10	17	
5	Hødd	14	5	3	6	36	29	+7	13	
6	Ørsta	14	4	4	6	24	41	−17	12	
7	Clausenengen (R)	14	4	1	9	29	35	−6	9	Relegation to 3. divisjon
8	Træff (R)	14	0	1	13	5	54	−49	1	Relegation to 3. divisjon

Source: rsssf.no
Rules for classification: 1) points; 2) goal difference; 3) number of goals scored.
(R) Relegated

==== Trøndelag ====
Pos	Team	Pld	W	D	L	GF	GA	GD	Pts	Qualification or relegation
1	Freidig (O, P)	14	9	2	3	42	23	+19	20	Qualification for the promotion play-offs
2	Falken	14	8	2	4	27	22	+5	18	
3	Steinkjer	14	7	2	5	33	26	+7	16	
4	Kvik	14	5	6	3	24	19	+5	16	
5	Brage	14	5	4	5	25	31	−6	14	
6	Neset	14	3	6	5	25	29	−4	12	
7	Nessegutten (R)	14	2	5	7	17	29	−12	9	Relegation to 3. divisjon
8	National (R)	14	3	1	10	18	32	−14	7	Relegation to 3. divisjon

Source: rsssf.no
Rules for classification: 1) points; 2) goal difference; 3) number of goals scored.
(O) Play-off winners; (P) Promoted; (R) Relegated

== Promotion play-offs ==
Sørland/Vestland
Results A1–A2

- Flekkefjord 3–2 Djerv 1919

Results A–B

- Flekkefjord 2–2 (a.e.t.) Nordnes
- Flekkefjord 2–3 Nordnes

Nordnes won 3–2 over Flekkefjord and were promoted to Hovedserien.

Møre/Trøndelag

- Langevåg 0–1 Freidig

Freidig won 1–0 over Langevåg and were promoted to Hovedserien.
