= Léon Schumacher =

Luxembourgish footballer

Personal information
- Date of birth: 5 July 1918
- Place of birth: Wormeldange, Luxembourg
- Date of death: 29 December 1985 (aged 67)
- Place of death: Esch-sur-Alzette, Luxembourg
- Position: Midfielder

International career
Years	Team	Apps	(Gls)
1946–1948	Luxembourg	12	(2)

Léon Schumacher (5 July 1918 – 29 December 1985) was a Luxembourgish footballer. He played in twelve matches for the Luxembourg national football team from 1946 to 1948. He was also part of Luxembourg's squad for the football tournament at the 1948 Summer Olympics, but he did not play in any matches.
