= Odd Hoel =

Norwegian footballer (1909-1979)

Personal information
- Full name: Odd Ørnulf Hoel
- Date of birth: 21 May 1909
- Place of birth: Bærum, Norway
- Date of death: 5 February 1979 (aged 69)
- Place of death: Oslo, Norway
- Position: Forward

Senior career*
Years	Team	Apps	(Gls)
- SFK Lyn

International career
1930–1931	Norway B	2	(0)
1932–1935	Norway	4	(4)
- * Club domestic league appearances and goals

Odd Ørnulf Hoel (21 May 1909 – 5 February 1979) was a Norwegian footballer who played for SFK Lyn. He was capped four times for the Norway national football team between 1932 and 1935, scoring four goals.

== Career statistics ==
=== International ===
Appearances and goals by national team and year
National team	Year	Apps	Goals
Norway	1932	1	0
Norway	1935	3	4
Total		4	4

=== International goals ===
Scores and results list Norway's goal tally first.

No	Date	Venue	Opponent	Score	Result	Competition
1.	27 June 1935	Ullevaal Stadion, Oslo, Norway	Germany	1–1	1–1	Friendly
2.	8 September 1935	Töölön Pallokenttä, Helsinki, Finland	Finland	1–0	5–1	1933–36 Nordic Football Championship
3.	8 September 1935	Töölön Pallokenttä, Helsinki, Finland	Finland	2–1	5–1	1933–36 Nordic Football Championship
4.	8 September 1935	Töölön Pallokenttä, Helsinki, Finland	Finland	3–1	5–1	1933–36 Nordic Football Championship
