= Bernhard Johansen =

Norwegian footballer (1929-2006)

Personal information
- Date of birth: 25 June 1929
- Date of death: 31 January 2006 (aged 76)

International career
Years	Team	Apps	(Gls)
1953	Norway	1	(0)

Bernhard Johansen (25 June 1929 – 31 January 2006) was a Norwegian footballer. He played in one match for the Norway national football team in 1953.
