= Poul Toft Jensen =

Danish footballer (1912–2000)

Poul Christian Toft Jensen (14 August 1912 – 18 January 2000) was a Danish amateur association football player, who played 13 games for the Denmark national football team from 1935 to 1938. Born in Slagelse, Jensen played as a midfielder for AB. Jensen was not a technically gifted player, but had a great stamina and was often among the best players for the Danish national team.
