= Reidar Kristiansen =

Norwegian footballer (1927-1999)

Personal information
- Date of birth: 19 March 1927
- Place of birth: Fredrikstad, Norway
- Date of death: 11 February 1999 (aged 71)
- Position: Midfielder

Senior career*
Years	Team	Apps	(Gls)
1950–1953	Lisleby		
1953–1962	Fredrikstad		

International career
1954–1957	Norway B	10	(4)
1955–1959	Norway	15	(0)
- * Club domestic league appearances and goals

Reidar Kristiansen (19 March 1927 – 11 February 1999) was a Norwegian footballer. He played in 15 matches for the Norway national football team from 1955 to 1959.
