= Arne Winther =

Norwegian footballer (1926–2000)

Personal information
- Date of birth: 22 January 1926
- Date of death: 14 February 2000 (aged 74)

International career
Years	Team	Apps	(Gls)
1955–1962	Norway	7	(0)

Arne Winther (22 January 1926 – 14 February 2000) was a Norwegian footballer. He played in seven matches for the Norway national football team from 1955 to 1962.
