= Bertil Ericsson =

Swedish footballer

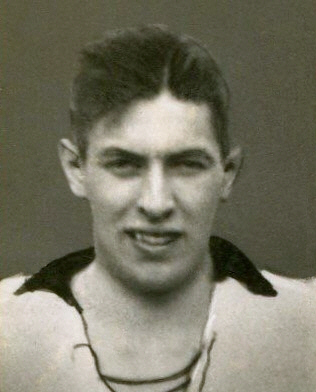

Karl Bertil Ericsson (6 November 1908 – 18 August 2002) was a Swedish footballer who played as a forward.

Born in Falun, he began his career with hometown club Falu IK and moved to AIK in 1932. He played for Sandvikens IF from 1933 to 1944 and Kubikenborgs IF from 1944 to 1946.

He played ten games for the Sweden national team, scoring as many goals. His debut was a 6–2 home win over Estonia in 1934 FIFA World Cup qualification, in which he scored twice. In the 1933–36 Nordic Football Championship, he scored seven goals as Sweden won, including four in a 5–3 win away to Denmark on 17 April 1934. He also played a 1938 FIFA World Cup qualification match. He was also part of Sweden's squad at the 1936 Summer Olympics, but he did not play in any matches.

== Honours ==
Sweden

- Nordic Football Championship: 1933–1936

Individual

- Nordic Football Championship top scorer: 1933–1936 (shared with Pauli Jørgensen)
