= Sverre Oddanger =

Norwegian footballer (1928–2020)

Personal information
- Full name: Sverre Egil Oddanger
- Date of birth: 13 May 1928
- Date of death: 17 November 2020 (aged 92)
- Place of death: Tjøme, Norway
- Position: Striker

Senior career*
Years	Team	Apps	(Gls)
1948–1955	Skeid		

International career
1949	Norway	1	(0)
- * Club domestic league appearances and goals

Sverre Egil Oddanger (13 May 1928 – 17 November 2020) was a Norwegian football striker.

He played for Skeid between 1948 and 1955. Winning his sole cap for Norway in 1949, he became league champion in 1953 and 1954. Skeid has registered him with 178 games across all competitions.

Born Sverre Egil Olsen, he changed his last name to Oddanger in 1957. He died on 17 November 2020 in Tjøme.
