= Tore Nilsen (footballer, born 1933) =

Norwegian footballer (1933–2018)

Personal information
- Date of birth: 28 October 1933
- Date of death: 13 May 2018 (aged 84)

International career
Years	Team	Apps	(Gls)
1956–1958	Norway	5	(0)

Tore Nilsen (28 October 1933 – 13 May 2018) was a Norwegian footballer. He played in five matches for the Norway national football team from 1956 to 1958.
