= Kaj Hansen (footballer, born 1917) =

Danish footballer and manager (1917–1987)

Personal information
- Full name: Kaj Aksel Hansen
- Date of birth: 22 April 1917
- Place of birth: Copenhagen, Denmark
- Date of death: 12 August 1987 (aged 70)
- Height: 1.66 m (5 ft 5 in)
- Positions: Winger; inside forward

Senior career*
Years	Team	Apps	(Gls)
1934–1940	B 93		
1940	Frem		
1941–1946	B 93		
1947	Stade Français	3	(0)
1948	CA Paris	18	(15)
1948–1949	Colmar	23	(8)
1949–1950	Metz	19	(0)

International career
1936–1946	Denmark	27	(12)

Managerial career
- 1952–1956: Vejle BK
- 1958–1961: Odense Boldklub
- 1972–1974: Odense Boldklub
- * Club domestic league appearances and goals

Kaj Aksel Hansen (22 April 1917 – 12 August 1987) was a Danish football player and manager. As an amateur player, he scored 114 goals in 202 games for B 93, and scored 12 goals in 27 games for the Denmark national football team. Hansen won five Danish football championships with B 93, and was the joint top goalscorer of the 1940 season. He was banned from Danish football in 1946, having illegally accepted payment to play. He then played professionally for French clubs Stade Francais, SR Colmar, FC Metz and CA Paris.

Having ended his active career in 1950, Hansen went on to manage Danish clubs Randers Freja, Vejle Boldklub, Odense Boldklub, and B 1909, as well as the unofficial Danish second-string national team.

== Career ==
Being 166 cm tall, Hansen was unusually short for a footballer within the league and was affectionately known as "Lille Kaj" (English: "Little Kaj"). He had excellent technique, balance and dribbling skills, and could play in all attacking positions apart from centre forward. He played the bulk of his career with Boldklubben af 1893 (B 93). Hansen made his senior debut with B 93 in 1934, and won the Danish football championship with the club in 1934 and 1935.

Hansen made his debut for the Denmark national football team on 30 June 1936, scoring one goal as the Norway national football team was defeated 4–1. In 1939, he scored two goals as Denmark won the 50-year anniversary tournament of the Danish Football Association, and was named player of the tournament. Hansen won an additional Danish championship with B 93 in 1939. As an unpaid amateur player, Hansen was free to move between clubs. He had a brief stint with B 93's rival club Boldklubben Frem from August to November 1940, scoring four goals in five games with the team. He moved back to B 93, with whom he won the 1942 and 1946 Danish championships. In September 1945, Kaj Hansen took part in a game of regional select teams played in Aarhus, alongside fellow Danish internationals Arne Sørensen, Børge Mathiesen, Kaj Christiansen, and Egon Sørensen. They were all subsequently banned for the rest of the year by both the Danish Football Association and the Copenhagen Football Association for excessive drinking on the trip.

In 1946, Kaj Hansen and Arne Sørensen both accepted payment to play for Skovshoved IF, in violation of the amateur-only code of the Danish Football Association. They were declared professionals, which barred them from playing football for both Danish clubs and the Danish national team. Hansen and Sørensen moved abroad to continue playing professionally, and they joined Stade Francais. Here they played alongside Børge Mathiesen. The physical side of the professional game did not suit Kaj Hansen, who spent much of his professional career out with injury. He represented French teams Stade Francais, SR Colmar, FC Metz, and CA Paris, before ending his playing career in 1950.

Kaj Hansen became a popular manager of several Danish teams. He went on to manage Randers Freja, Vejle Boldklub, Odense Boldklub, and B 1909. He also managed the Danish second-string national team for five unofficial games in 1958 and 1960, winning two games and losing one.

== Honours ==
- Danish football championship: 1934, 1935, 1939, 1942, 1946
- Danish football championship, top goalscorer: 1940
