= Helge Helgesen =

Norwegian footballer (1912-1992)

Personal information
- Date of birth: 27 September 1912
- Date of death: 14 May 1992 (aged 79)

International career
Years	Team	Apps	(Gls)
1933	Norway	1	(1)

Helge Helgesen (27 September 1912 – 14 May 1992) was a Norwegian footballer. He played in one match for the Norway national football team in 1933.
