= Carl Lundsteen =

Danish footballer (1912-1989)

Personal information
- Date of birth: 23 August 1912
- Date of death: 27 April 1989 (aged 76)

International career
Years	Team	Apps	(Gls)
1934	Denmark	3	(3)

Carl Lundsteen (23 August 1912 – 27 April 1989) was a Danish footballer. He played in three matches for the Denmark national football team in 1934.
