= Thøger Nordbø =

Norwegian footballer (1904–1994)

Personal information
- Full name: Thøger Heinrich Leon Nordbø
- Date of birth: 29 October 1904
- Place of birth: Oslo, Norway
- Date of death: 1 May 1994 (aged 89)
- Position: Midfielder

Senior career*
Years	Team	Apps	(Gls)
- Frigg Oslo FK
- Club Français
- Frigg Oslo FK

International career
1928–1935	Norway	5	(0)
- * Club domestic league appearances and goals

Thøger Heinrich Leon Nordbø (29 October 1904 – 1 May 1994) was a Norwegian footballer who played as a midfielder for Frigg Oslo FK and Club Français. He made five appearances for the Norway national team from 1928 to 1935. According to his son, Thøger Nordbø Jr, Thøger Norbø Sr. and his brothers participated in Nazi resistance during the occupation of Norway by distributing leaflets and skiing Jewish people to Sweden.
