= Arthur Kvammen =

Norwegian footballer (1905-1968)

Personal information
- Date of birth: 7 August 1905
- Date of death: 31 October 1968 (aged 63)

International career
| Years | Team | Apps | (Gls) |
| 1933 | Norway | 1 | (1) |

Arthur Kvammen (7 August 1905 – 31 October 1968) was a Norwegian footballer. He played in one match for the Norway national football team in 1933. He scored a single goal.
