= Sverre Berglie =

Norwegian footballer (1910-1985)

Personal information
- Date of birth: 1 October 1910
- Date of death: 21 August 1985 (aged 74)
- Position: Forward

Senior career*
Years	Team	Apps	(Gls)
–1931	Skiold		
1932–1940	Drafn		

International career
1934	Norway	3	(5)
- * Club domestic league appearances and goals

Sverre Berglie (21 October 1910 – 21 August 1985) was a Norwegian footballer who played as a forward for the Norway national football team.

He was also capped once in bandy.

== Career statistics ==
=== International ===
National team	Year	Apps	Goals
Norway	1934	3	5
Total		2	3

=== International goals ===
Scores and results list Norway's goal tally first.

No	Date	Venue	Opponent	Score	Result	Competition
1.	6 August 1934	Ullevaal Stadion, Oslo, Norway	Austria (amateur)	2–0	4–0	Friendly
2.	6 August 1934	Ullevaal Stadion, Oslo, Norway	Austria (amateur)	4–0	4–0	Friendly
3.	2 September 1934	Oslo, Norway	Finland	1–?	4–2	Friendly
4.	2 September 1934	Oslo, Norway	Finland	2–?	4–2	Friendly
5.	23 September 1934	Oslo, Norway	Denmark	1–?	3–1	Friendly
