= Harry Kure =

Norwegian footballer (1928-2007)

Personal information
- Date of birth: 12 April 1928
- Date of death: 8 September 2007 (aged 79)

International career
Years	Team	Apps	(Gls)
1951–1957	Norway	16	(5)

Harry Kure (12 April 1928 – 8 September 2007) was a Norwegian footballer. He played in 16 matches for the Norway national football team from 1951 to 1957.
