= Thorleif Svendsen =

Norwegian footballer (1910-1975)

Personal information
- Date of birth: 7 June 1910
- Date of death: 21 September 1975 (aged 65)

International career
Years	Team	Apps	(Gls)
1934	Norway	3	(2)

Thorleif Svendsen (7 June 1910 – 21 September 1975) was a Norwegian footballer. He played in three matches for the Norway national football team in 1934.
