= József Solti =

Hungarian footballer

József Solti (29 November 1911 – 15 June 1982) was a Hungarian footballer. Born in Szeged, he played for Phöbus FC.

He made his international debut for Hungary on 29 April 1934, scoring twice in a 4–1 win over Bulgaria in Budapest in the 1934 FIFA World Cup qualification. His only other appearance was a friendly on 2 April 1939, which Hungary lost 3–1 away to Switzerland.
