= Birger Pedersen =

Danish footballer (born 1950)

Personal information
- Full name: Birger Lindberg Pedersen
- Date of birth: 29 June 1950 (age 76)
- Place of birth: Vordingborg, Denmark
- Position: Midfielder

Senior career*
Years	Team	Apps	(Gls)
1968–1972	Hvidovre IF		
1972–1974	KV Mechelen		
1974	Hvidovre IF		
1975	Helsingborgs IF		
1976–1980	Hvidovre IF		
1981	Lyngby BK		

International career
1968	Denmark u19	2	(0)
1970–1971	Denmark u21	3	(0)
1970–1972	Denmark	14	(1)
- * Club domestic league appearances and goals

Birger Lindberg Pedersen (born 29 June 1950), known as Birger Pedersen, is a Danish former association footballer in the midfielder position, who played 183 games and scored 41 goals for Danish club Hvidovre IF. He played 14 matches for the Denmark national football team, and scored a goal in the 1971 play-off game against Romania helping Denmark qualify for the 1972 Summer Olympics. He was named 1971 Danish Football Player of the Year. Pedersen signed a professional contract with KV Mechelen in Belgium in 1972, and was not eligible for the Olympics final tournament. He also played for Helsingborgs IF in Sweden before ending his career with Danish club Lyngby BK in 1981, due to injuries.
