= Helmuth Søbirk =

Danish footballer (1916–1992)

Personal information
- Full name: Helmuth Arne Torkild Emin Søbirk
- Date of birth: 8 September 1916
- Place of birth: Valby, Denmark
- Date of death: 19 August 1992 (aged 75)
- Position: Right winger

Youth career
- B 93
- Boldklubben Frem

Senior career*
Years	Team	Apps	(Gls)
1935–1937	Boldklubben Frem		
1937–1939	B 93	44	(31)
1939–1949	Boldklubben Frem	146	(57)

International career
1935–1945	Denmark	30	(10)
- * Club domestic league appearances and goals

Helmuth Arne Torkild Emin Søbirk (8 September 1916 – 19 August 1992) was a Danish amateur football player, who played 30 games and scored 10 goals for the Denmark national football team. Due to World War II, 10 of his last 14 internationals were matches against Sweden. Søbirk spent his club career with BK Frem and B 93. He was a forward and known for his trickery and cheeky style, which could zap his opponent's confidence.

Søbirk worked as a hospital porter and radio dealer.

== Honours ==
- Danish Championships: 1935–36, 1940–41 and 1943–44 with Frem, 1938–39 with B 93
