= Sven Andersson (footballer, born 1907) =

Swedish footballer

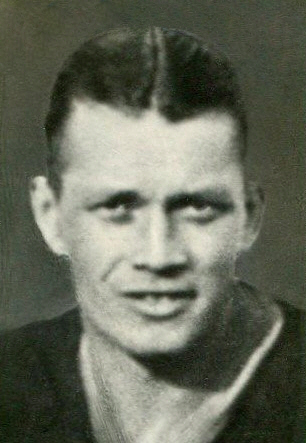

Personal information
- Full name: Sven Oskar Albin Andersson
- Date of birth: 14 February 1907
- Place of birth: Össeby-Garn, Sweden
- Date of death: 30 May 1981 (aged 74)
- Place of death: Solna, Sweden
- Position: Defender

Senior career*
| Years | Team | Apps | (Gls) |
| 1928–1940 | AIK | 235 | (28) |

International career
| 1930–1938 | Sweden | 27 | (3) |
- * Club domestic league appearances and goals

Sven Oskar Albin Andersson (14 February 1907 – 30 May 1981) was a Swedish football defender and bandy player. He played for Sweden in the 1934 FIFA World Cup. He also played for AIK Fotboll.
