= Per Ljostveit =

Norwegian footballer (1928-1990)

Personal information
- Date of birth: 21 October 1928
- Date of death: 17 May 1990 (aged 61)

International career
Years	Team	Apps	(Gls)
1954–1956	Norway	7	(0)

Per Ljostveit (21 October 1928 – 17 May 1990) was a Norwegian footballer. He played in seven matches for the Norway national football team from 1954 to 1956.
