= Carl Jamissen =

Norwegian footballer (1910–1990)

Personal information
- Date of birth: 12 June 1910
- Date of death: 10 December 1990 (aged 80)

International career
Years	Team	Apps	(Gls)
1935	Norway	3	(1)

Carl Jamissen (12 June 1910 – 10 December 1990) was a Norwegian footballer. He played in three matches for the Norway national football team in 1935.
