= Geithus IL =

Norwegian football club

- Full name: Geithus Idrettslag
- Founded: 16 January 1892
- Ground: Rolighetsmoen, Geithus; Furumo stadion, Geithus (speed skating)
- League: Sixth Division
- 2025: 2nd

Geithus Idrettslag is a Norwegian multi-sports club from Geithus, Modum. It has sections for association football and speed skating.

The club was founded on 16 January 1892, its oldest constituent part being the skiing club Modum SK. It later merged with Geithus IF (founded 1909) and the workers' club Geithus AIL (founded 1933), taking the Geithus IL name in 1940. The club colours are yellow with black shorts.

In its early history, Geithus IL also had sections for team handball and Nordic skiing. Its current speed skating track has also been used as an ice rink for curling.

Before World War II, the men's football team won promotion to the highest Norwegian league in 1937. The team finished third in their group in the 1937–38 League of Norway before being relegated in 1938–39. Returning to the league in the first post-war season, 1947–48, Geithus ended last again.

Playing the next years on the second tier, Geithus notably won their group in 1949–50 and beat Solberg in the pre-playoff to reach the promotion playoff. However, they succumbed to Odd, Kristiansund and Kvik. Winning their group again in 1950–51, they lost to Asker in the pre-playoff. Finally, when they won their group in 1952–53, one point ahead of Vålerengen, Geithus were promoted directly to the 1953–54 Norwegian Main League. Having won 3 out of the 14 matches, they were relegated again, followed by a back-to-back relegation in 1955.

Notable runs in the Norwegian Football Cup included reaching the third round in 1950, 1954 and 1961. The team's last cup appearance came in 1980, losing to Mjøndalen in the first round. Tom Gulbrandsen started his career in Geithus IL. After the 2007 season, Geithus IL cooperated with other local teams to form Modum FK, though Modum FK was formally a continuation of another of the merging clubs, Åmot IF.

The men's football team currently plays in the Sixth Division, the seventh tier of football in Norway. The club currently fields no women's team.
