= Hans Nordahl =

Norwegian footballer (1918-1993)

Hans Nordahl (29 April 1918 – 15 August 1993) was a Norwegian footballer. He played as a forward for Skeid in the top Norwegian league, winning the Norwegian Football Cup title in 1947, 1954, 1955, 1956 and 1958. Nordahl was also capped 19 times for the Norway national team, scoring eight goals.
