= Ragnar Pedersen (footballer) =

Norwegian footballer (1906-1984)

Personal information
- Date of birth: 28 April 1906
- Date of death: 7 September 1984 (aged 78)

International career
Years	Team	Apps	(Gls)
1932–1933	Norway	6	(3)

Ragnar Pedersen (28 April 1906 – 7 September 1984) was a Norwegian footballer. He played in six matches for the Norway national football team from 1932 to 1933.
