= Henry Johannessen =

Norwegian footballer (1923–2005)

Henry Oliver Johannessen
Personal information
- Full name: Henry Oliver Johannessen
- Date of birth: 12 December 1923
- Place of birth: Fredrikstad, Norway
- Date of death: 1 March 2005 (aged 81)
- Position: Forward

Senior career*
Years	Team	Apps	(Gls)
- Fredrikstad FK

International career
1946–1955	Norway	14	(7)
- * Club domestic league appearances and goals

Henry Oliver Johannessen (12 December 1923 – 1 March 2005) was a Norwegian footballer who played as a forward. He was born in Fredrikstad, and played for the sports club Fredrikstad FK. He played for the Norway national team at the 1952 Summer Olympics in Helsinki. He scored seven goals in 14 matches for Norway between 1946 and 1955.
