= Max Viinioksa =

Finnish footballer (1905–1977)

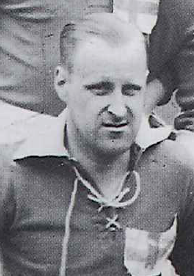
- Viinioksa in 1933

Personal information
- Date of birth: 27 October 1905
- Place of birth: Helsinki, Finland
- Date of death: 1 February 1977 (aged 71)
- Position: Defender

International career
Years	Team	Apps	(Gls)
1926–1935	Finland	50	(1)

Max Viinioksa (27 October 1905 – 1 February 1977) was a Finnish footballer who played as a defender. He made 50 appearances for the Finland national team from 1926 to 1935.
