= Reidar Kvammen =

Norwegian footballer (1914–1998)

Personal information
- Full name: Reidar Kvammen
- Date of birth: 23 July 1914
- Place of birth: Stavanger, Norway
- Date of death: 27 October 1998 (aged 84)
- Place of death: Stavanger, Norway
- Position: Striker

Senior career*
| Years | Team | Apps | (Gls) |
| 1931–1952 | Viking | | |

International career
| 1933–1949 | Norway | 51 | (17) |

Managerial career
- 1953: Molde
- 1957: Bryne
- 1960–1963: Bryne
- 1964: Viking
- 1966: Bryne
- * Club domestic league appearances and goals

Olympic medal record

Men's Football
| Bronze medal – third place | 1936 Berlin | Team |

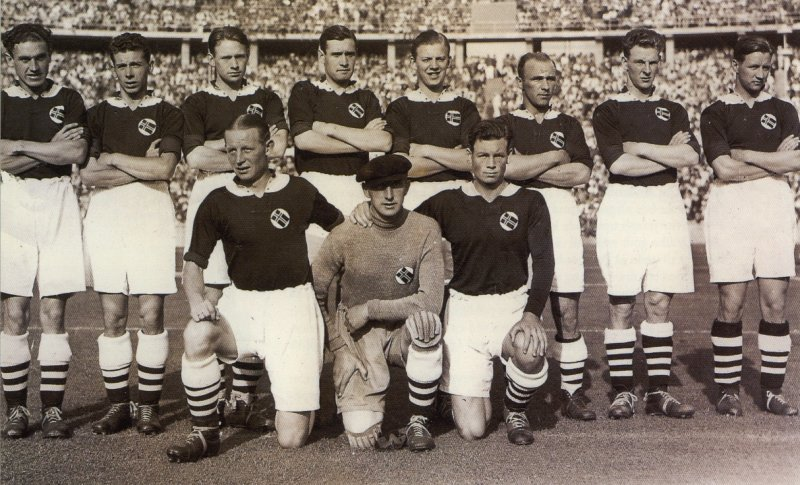
Reidar Kvammen (third from left, back row), 1936

Reidar Kvammen (23 July 1914 – 27 October 1998) was a Norwegian footballer. Kvammen was an inside-forward who played his entire career for Viking, and is regarded as one of Norway's greatest footballers of all time. Kvammen was the first Norwegian footballer to reach 50 caps. Overall, he played 51 internationals and scored 17 goals for Norway.

Kvammen was a prominent member of the Norwegian bronze medal-winning team in the 1936 Olympics, and also played in the World Cup two years later. At club level, he scored 202 goals, which to this date is still a Viking club record.

After his career as player, Kvammen had spells as coach at Molde, Bryne and Viking.

== Personal life ==
Kvammen was born in Stavanger, the son of shoemaker Rasmus Andreas Kvammen and Janna Kvammen, and worked as a police officer. He married Anna Martea Steen in 1942. During the German occupation of Norway Kvammen was sent to a concentration camp in German-occupied Poland: he had refused to participate in the Nazification of the police. He was first imprisoned in August 1943 and held in prison in Stavanger, then in Grini concentration camp from August to December 1943, then in Stutthof concentration camp until the end of the war. Captivity was a physical strain on Kvammen, and he had to go to Sweden for rehabilitation after the war.

His autobiography, 50 ganger på Norges landslag, was issued in 1949.
