= Sverre Hansen (footballer) =

Norwegian footballer (1913–1974)

Personal information
- Full name: Sverre Hansen
- Date of birth: 23 June 1913
- Place of birth: Norway
- Date of death: 22 August 1974 (aged 61)
- Position: Midfielder

International career
| Years | Team | Apps | (Gls) |
- Norway

Olympic medal record

Men's Football

Representing Norway
| Bronze medal – third place | 1936 Berlin | Team |

Sverre Hansen (23 June 1913 – 22 August 1974) was a Norwegian football player who competed in the Olympic Games in 1936. He was born in Larvik. He was a member of the national team that won the bronze medal in Berlin. He earned 15 caps and scored 7 goals for the Norway national football team from 1933 to 1936.
