= IF Trauma =

Norwegian sports club

- Full name: Idrettsforeningen Trauma
- Ground: Hove kunstgress, Tromøya
- League: Fourth Division
- 2024: 7th
Home colours

Idrettsforeningen Trauma is a Norwegian sports club from Tromøya. (Trauma is an archaic name of Tromøya.) It has sections for association football, team handball and orienteering.

The club was founded on 18 January 1896. The club formerly had sections for Nordic skiing and speed skating.

After the Second World War, Trauma played in the Landsdelsserien, the second tier of men's football in Norway, in 1952–53 and 1953–54.

The men's football team currently plays in the Fourth Division, the fifth tier of Norwegian football. The team had stints in the Third Division from 2002 to 2004 and 2006 to 2010. During the latter period, the team also reached the first round of the cup in 2008, 2009 and 2010.

Morten Knutsen has been a player and manager of IF Trauma. Afghanistan international players Balal Arezou and Amid Arezou have also played for Trauma.
