= 1953–54 Norwegian Main League =

10th season of top-tier football league in Norway

Hovedserien
- Season: 1953–54
- Champions: Fredrikstad; 6th title
- Relegated: Varegg; Nordnes; Geithus; Moss

The 1953–54 Hovedserien was the 10th completed season of top division football in Norway.

== Overview ==
It was contested by 16 teams, and Fredrikstad FK won the championship.

== Teams and locations ==
Note: Table lists in alphabetical order.

Group A
Team	Ap.	Location
Asker	3	Asker
Larvik Turn	5	Larvik
Nordnes	1	Bergen
Sandefjord BK	8	Sandefjord
Skeid	8	Oslo
Sparta	7	Sarpsborg
Varegg	2	Bergen
Viking	9	Stavanger

Group B
Team	Ap.	Location
Fredrikstad	9	Fredrikstad
Freidig	3	Trondheim
Geithus	4	Modum
Lillestrøm	4	Lillestrøm
Moss	3	Moss
Odd	7	Skien
Sarpsborg FK	9	Sarpsborg
Strømmen	5	Strømmen

== League tables ==
=== Group A ===
Pos	Team	Pld	W	D	L	GF	GA	GD	Pts	Qualification or relegation
1	Skeid	14	10	2	2	33	14	+19	22	Qualification for the championship final
2	Sparta	14	9	3	2	29	17	+12	21	
3	Asker	14	8	2	4	35	21	+14	18	
4	Larvik Turn	14	7	2	5	35	24	+11	16	
5	Viking	14	4	5	5	19	20	−1	13	
6	Sandefjord BK	14	3	5	6	20	22	−2	11	
7	Varegg (R)	14	2	4	8	16	38	−22	8	Relegation
8	Nordnes (R)	14	1	1	12	8	39	−31	3	Relegation

Source: RSSSF
(R) Relegated

=== Group B ===
Pos	Team	Pld	W	D	L	GF	GA	GD	Pts	Qualification or relegation
1	Fredrikstad (C)	14	10	1	3	47	20	+27	21	Qualification for the championship final
2	Strømmen	14	8	4	2	32	17	+15	20	
3	Lillestrøm	14	8	3	3	45	22	+23	19	
4	Odd	14	5	4	5	26	25	+1	14	
5	Sarpsborg FK	14	5	2	7	24	29	−5	12	
6	Freidig	14	4	3	7	20	26	−6	11	
7	Geithus (R)	14	3	2	9	18	45	−27	8	Relegation
8	Moss (R)	14	2	3	9	23	51	−28	7	Relegation

Source: RSSSF
(C) Champions; (R) Relegated

== Results ==
=== Group A ===
Home \ Away	ASK	LAR	NOR	SBK	SKD	SPA	VAR	VIK
Asker		4–0	2–0	2–3	3–1	1–2	6–2	3–3
Larvik Turn	2–4		12–0	1–1	1–2	4–3	3–2	2–1
Nordnes	0–3	2–3		2–0	0–3	1–3	1–2	0–1
Sandefjord BK	1–2	1–2	0–0		0–0	0–1	6–0	3–2
Skeid	2–1	2–0	3–0	4–2		5–1	2–0	2–0
Sparta	3–1	0–0	2–0	4–1	2–1		4–1	1–1
Varegg	1–1	0–4	3–2	1–1	3–3	0–2		0–2
Viking	1–2	2–1	2–0	1–1	1–3	1–1	1–1	

Source: NIFS.no
Legend: Blue = home team win; Yellow = draw; Red = away team win.

=== Group B ===
Home \ Away	FFK	FRE	GEI	LIL	MOS	ODD	SAR	STR
Fredrikstad		2–3	6–1	2–0	8–1	4–2	4–0	0–1
Freidig	2–4		2–0	1–2	4–2	1–3	4–2	0–1
Geithus	2–3	0–0		1–3	1–4	2–1	1–0	2–2
Lillestrøm	3–3	2–0	10–0		7–0	2–0	3–1	1–1
Moss	0–3	0–0	3–5	2–6		2–4	2–1	2–2
Odd	2–1	1–1	2–1	3–3	5–1		1–1	0–2
Sarpsborg FK	2–3	5–1	3–2	3–1	3–2	1–1		1–4
Strømmen	1–4	2–1	6–0	5–2	2–2	3–1	0–1	

Source: NIFS.no
Legend: Blue = home team win; Yellow = draw; Red = away team win.

== Championship final ==
- Fredrikstad 2–1 Skeid
