= 1940 Norwegian Football Cup =

Norgesmester i fotball for menn 1940

Tournament details
- Country: Norway
- Teams: 128 (main competition)

Final positions
- Champions: Fredrikstad (5th title)
- Runners-up: Skeid

The 1940 Norwegian Football Cup was the 39th season of the Norwegian annual knockout football tournament. This was the last cup until the end of Second World War, due to a sports strike against competition organized by Vidkun Quisling. The tournament was open for all members of NFF, except those from Northern Norway. The final was played at Ullevaal Stadion in Oslo on 13 October 1940, and was contested by the last year's losing finalist Skeid and the four-time former winners Fredrikstad. Fredrikstad secured their fifth title with a 3–0 win in the final. Sarpsborg were the defending champions, but were eliminated by Fredrikstad in the semifinal.

== Rounds and dates ==
- First round: 4 August
- Second round: 18. August
- Third round: 1 September
- Fourth round: 8 September
- Quarter-finals: 22 September
- Semi-finals: 6 October
- Final: 13 October

== First round ==
Team 1	Score	Team 2
Asker	1–2	Skiens-Grane
Aurskog og Lierfoss	1–8	Nydalen
Bjart	1–4	Lisleby
Borg	1–2	Gimsøy
Bragerøen	3–1	Tønsberg Turn
Brann	6–0	Hird
Clausenengen	6–2	Braatt
Donn	6–0	Mandal
Drafn	6–1	Borre
Drøbak	1–8	Kvik (Halden)
Fjell	2–3	Start
Fjellkameratene	1–2	Årstad
Flekkefjord	3–0	Vigør
Florø-Varg	1–0	Sandane
Fram (Larvik)	3–1	Dæhlenengen
Fredrikstad	10–1	Mercantile
Freidig	3–1	Verdal
Fremad Lillehammer	4–1	Briskebyen
Frigg	11–0	Grue
Geithus	2–1	Vikersund
Gleng	2–7	Gjøa
Grane (Arendal)	4–1	Kragerø
Gresvik	2–1	Strong
Hamar	7–1	Ullensaker
Hardy	0–1	Trane
Jevnaker	5–0	Kapp
Kjelsås	4–4 (a.e.t.)	Lyn (Gjøvik)
Kongsberg	3–1	Skiens BK
Kongsvinger	0–1	Drammens BK
Kvik (Trondheim)	4–3	National
Lillestrøm	7–0	Haga
Magnor	1–6	Lyn
Molde	3–2	Træff
Moss	8–0	Greåker
Nordlandet	1–7	Kristiansund
Odd	5–1	Star
Orkanger	6–2	Dalguten
Os	0–14	Djerv
Pors	5–1	Storm
Rakkestad	2–9	Sarpsborg
Ranheim	3–1	Brage
Raufoss	1–5	Sandaker
Rjukan	1–2	Snøgg
Rollon	4–2	Sykkylven
Rosenborg	1–2	Neset
Roy	2–4	Skiold
Sandefjord BK	3–3 (a.e.t.)	Strømsgodset
Selbak	10–0	Fagerborg
Skeid	6–1	Falk
Stabæk	0–2	Mjøndalen
Stavanger	13–1	Odda
Sverre	5–1 (a.e.t.)	Steinkjer
Tistedalen	0–2	Torp
Tynset	5–1	Bergmann
Tønsberg-Kameratene	4–0	Larvik Turn
Ulf	1–8	Viking
Urædd	1–2	Sparta Drammen
Vard	1–0	Stord
Vardal	4–2	Kolbotn
Voss	1–1 (a.e.t.)	Pallas
Vålerengen	4–1	Eidsvold IF
Ørn	3–0	Liv
Ørsta	1–3	Aalesund
Ålgård	1–2	Jarl
Replay
Lyn (Gjøvik)	3–1	Kjelsås
Pallas	2–3	Voss
Strømsgodset	2–3 (a.e.t.)	Sandefjord BK

== Second round ==
Team 1	Score	Team 2
Brann	3–0	Florø-Varg
Djerv	4–2 (a.e.t.)	Voss
Drammens BK	0–5	Fredrikstad
Freidig	7–2	Tynset
Gimsøy	3–1	Odd
Gjøa	2–0	Fremad Lillehammer
Lyn (Gjøvik)	1–0	Jevnaker
Grane (Arendal)	2–1	Donn
Hamar	1–5	Frigg
Jarl	0–2	Stavanger
Kristiansund	2–3	Rollon
Kvik (Halden)	3–2	Ørn
Kvik (Trondheim)	6–1	Clausenengen
Lisleby	5–4 (a.e.t.)	Bragerøen
Lyn	7–1	Vardal
Mjøndalen	4–1	Geithus
Neset	4–0	Sverre
Nydalen	2–1	Selbak
Pors	5–0	Sandefjord BK
Ranheim	4–2	Orkanger
Sandaker	1–5	Moss
Sarpsborg	3–0	Gresvik
Skiens-Grane	1–0	Kongsberg
Skiold	5–2 (a.e.t.)	Fram (Larvik)
Snøgg	3–2	Vålerengen
Sparta Drammen	4–5 (a.e.t.)	Drafn
Start	3–1	Flekkefjord
Torp	1–2	Lillestrøm
Tønsberg-Kameratene	1–9	Skeid
Viking	2–1	Vard
Aalesund	3–0	Molde
Årstad	1–0	Trane

== Third round ==
Team 1	Score	Team 2
Rollon	0–2	Aalesund
Brann	1–0	Årstad
Djerv	2–3	Drafn
Fredrikstad	8–1	Nydalen
Freidig	3–7	Kvik (Trondheim)
Frigg	7–1	Lisleby
Gimsøy	1–2	Mjøndalen
Lyn (Gjøvik)	3–2	Gjøa
Start	1–0	Grane (Arendal)
Moss	3–1	Skiens-Grane
Kvik (Halden)	1–6	Lyn
Lillestrøm	2–0	Pors
Neset	3–1	Ranheim
Skiold	1–2	Sarpsborg
Skeid	3–0	Snøgg
Stavanger	1–3	Viking

== Fourth round ==
Team 1	Score	Team 2
Drafn	1–2	Aalesund
Brann	0–7	Moss
Frigg	0–1	Fredrikstad
Kvik (Trondheim)	1–3	Neset
Lyn	3–0	Lillestrøm
Sarpsborg	1–0	Lyn (Gjøvik)
Mjøndalen	0–2	Skeid
Viking	5–0	Start

== Quarter-finals ==
Team 1	Score	Team 2
Skeid	3–2	Aalesund
Fredrikstad	10–0	Viking
Moss	1–1 (a.e.t.)	Lyn
Neset	1–3	Sarpsborg
Replay
Lyn	1–2	Moss

== Semi-finals ==
Team 1	Score	Team 2
Sarpsborg	0–1	Fredrikstad
Skeid	6–3	Moss

== Final ==
13 October 1940

Fredrikstad	3–0	Skeid
Ileby 36', 51'; Brynildsen 70' (pen.)	Report

Ullevaal Stadion, Oslo
Attendance: 31,410
Referee: Thorleiv Nordbø (Frigg)

Fredrikstad:
Hans Hansen
Rolf Johannessen
Bjørn Berger
Gunnar Andreassen
Håkon Johansen
Reidar Olsen
Thorleif Larsen
Bjørn Spydevold
Knut Brynildsen
Kjell Moe
Arne Ileby

Skeid:
Knut Arnevåg
Halvdan Dyhre
Einar Trondsen
Willy Sundblad
John Bøhleng
Gustav Rehn
Henry Mathiesen
Hans Nordahl
Brede Borgen
Per Laurendz
Paul Sætrang

== See also ==
- 1939–40 League of Norway
- 1940 in Norwegian football
