= 1945 in Norwegian football =

Football in Norway
Men's football
- NM: Lyn

Results from Norwegian football in 1945.

== Norwegian Cup ==
=== Final ===
14 October 1945

Fredrikstad	1–1 (a.e.t.)	Lyn
Brynildsen 46' (pen.)	Report	Osnes 19'

Ullevaal Stadion, Oslo
Attendance: 34,162
Referee: Haakon Engebretsen (Brage)

Replay

28 October 1945

Fredrikstad	1–1 (a.e.t.)	Lyn
Ileby 84'	Report	Osnes 19'

Sarpsborg Stadion, Sarpsborg
Attendance: 18,000
Referee: Edvin Pedersen (Gjøa)

Second replay

4 November 1945

Lyn	4–0	Fredrikstad
Sveinsson 17'; Bråthen 25', 30', 35'	Report

Bislett Stadion, Oslo
Attendance: 31,412
Referee: Nils Gundersen (Fram Larvik)

== National team ==
26 August 1945 Friendly	Denmark	4–2	Norway	Copenhagen, Denmark
13:00 (UTC+1); Match 143	Christiansen 7', 50'; K. Aa. Hansen 83'; Aa. R. Jensen 89'	Report	Spydevold 35'; Moe 44'	Stadium: Københavns Idrætspark; Attendance: 40,000; Referee: Torsten Carlsson (Sweden)

9 September 1945 Friendly	Norway	1–5	Denmark	Aker, Norway
13:15 (UTC+1); Match 144	Brynildsen 46'	Report	Bronée 30'; V. Jensen 41'; K. Aa. Hansen 67', 82'; Præst 84'	Stadium: Ullevaal Stadion; Attendance: 34,000; Referee: Ivan Eklind (Sweden)

21 October 1945 Friendly	Sweden	10–0	Norway	Solna, Sweden
14:00 (UTC+1); Match 145	Persson 1'; Nordahl 12', 26', 82', 89'; Carlsson 31', 61'; Nyberg 48', 85'; Gren 73'	Report		Stadium: Råsunda Stadium; Attendance: 29,674; Referee: Valdemar Laursen (Denmark)
