= 1945 Norwegian Football Cup =

Norgesmesterskapet i fotball for menn 1945

Tournament details
- Country: Norway
- Teams: 128 (main competition)

Final positions
- Champions: Lyn (5th title)
- Runners-up: Fredrikstad

The 1945 Norwegian Football Cup was the 40th season of the Norwegian annual knockout football tournament. This was the first cup in five years, due to the Second World War. The tournament was open for all members of NFF, except those from Northern Norway. The final was contested by the defending champions Fredrikstad and the four-time former winners Lyn. It took two replays to decide a winner, and in the third final Lyn won 4–0 securing their fifth title and the first title in 34 years, having last won in 1911.

== First round ==
Team 1	Score	Team 2
Birkebeineren	5–2	Kongsberg
Braatt	1–3	Nordlandet
Brann	7–0	Florvåg
Briskebyen	2–3	Kapp
Brodd	3–3 (a.e.t.)	Viking
Djerv	3–4 (a.e.t.)	Høydekameratene
Drøbak	0–2	Moss
Eidsvold IF	1–7	Skeid
Fram (Brumunddal)	1–5	Bøn
Fram (Larvik)	3–1 (a.e.t.)	BFG
Fredensborg	0–3	Strong
Frigg	4–1	Asker
Geithus	0–3	Strømsgodset
Gjøvik-Lyn	3–1	Vardal
Gleng	2–6	Lisleby
Grane (Arendal)	3–4 (a.e.t.)	Donn
Grane (Oslo)	0–14	Fredrikstad
Gresvik	3–2 (a.e.t.)	Sparta
Grue	1–3	Haga
Hardy	2–3	Fjellkameratene
Jarl	0–5	Djerv 1919
Jerv	1–2	Start
Jordal	1–3	Gjøa
Klepp	5–3	Mandalskameratene
Kristiansund	4–0	Molde
Kvik (Halden)	4–2	Kråkerøy
Lilleaker	0–2	Vålerengen
Lillestrøm	7–2	Bjørkelangen
Lyn	4–0	Lillestrøm/Fram
Lyn (Trondheim)	2–4	Falken (Trondheim)
Mjøndalen	3–3 (a.e.t.)	Eiker
Moelven	0–6	Spartacus
National	5–0	Brage
Neset	3–1 (a.e.t.)	Tryggkam
Nessegutten	2–4	Verdal
Nydalen	6–1	Sandvika
Odd	5–0	Rjukan
Pors	2–1 (a.e.t.)	Skiens BK
Ranheim	4–0	Gå-På (Tynset)
Rapid	4–2	Falk
Raufoss	3–1 (a.e.t.)	Jevnaker
Rollon	2–5	Træff
Rosenborg	1–2	Kvik (Trondheim)
Sandefjord BK	3–2 (a.e.t.)	Larvik Turn
Sarpsborg	12–1	Kjelsås
Selbak	3–2	Stabæk
Skiens Grane	1–0	Tønsberg-Kameratene
Skiold	2–0	Storm
Slemmestad	2–1	Drammens BK
Snøgg	1–1 (a.e.t.)	Urædd
Solberg	2–1	Drafn
Steinkjer	0–3	Ørn (Trondheim)
Torp	6–0	Sandaker
Trysilgutten	1–2	Hamar
Tønsberg Turn	5–2	Strømmen
Ulefoss	1–3	Borg
Vard	2–0	Stål
Vigør	2–0	Flekkefjord
Voss	6–0	Nymark
Wing	2–0	Løkken
Ørn (Horten)	1–2	Vikersund
Aalesund	8–0	Volda
Ålgård	1–3	Stavanger
Årstad	5–1	Falken (Høyanger)
Replay
Eiker	0–1	Mjøndalen
Urædd	6–2	Snøgg
Viking	4–0	Brodd

== Second round ==
Team 1	Score	Team 2
Borg	3–2	Vigør
Bøn	0–10	Lyn
Djerv 1919	2–0	Brann
Donn	2–3 (a.e.t.)	Start
Falken (Trondheim)	2–3	Wing
Fjellkameratene	1–4	Voss
Fredrikstad	7–0	Solberg
Gjøa	4–3	Gjøvik-Lyn
Haga	0–5	Lillestrøm
Hamar	2–6	Nydalen
Høydekameratene	1–3	Årstad
Kapp	3–4 (a.e.t.)	Frigg
Kvik (Trondheim)	2–1	Neset
Lisleby	5–1	Pors
Mjøndalen	2–1	Skiens Grane
Moss	4–0	Slemmestad
Nordlandet	0–1	Kristiansund
Odd	0–1	Fram (Larvik)
Sandefjord BK	3–0	Torp
Skeid	5–2	Gresvik
Spartacus	0–8	Raufoss
Stavanger	3–1	Vard
Strong	1–1 (a.e.t.)	Skiold
Strømsgodset	3–1	Kvik (Halden)
Tønsberg Turn	1–4	Sarpsborg
Urædd	1–2	Birkebeineren
Verdal	3–0	National
Vikersund	1–0	Rapid
Viking	2–1	Klepp
Vålerengen	2–1 (a.e.t.)	Selbak
Ørn (Trondheim)	0–4	Ranheim
Aalesund	3–1	Træff
Replay
Skiold	4–1	Strong

== Third round ==
Team 1	Score	Team 2
2 September 1945
Kristiansund	2–1 (a.e.t.)	Aalesund
Årstad	1–0	Voss
Birkebeineren	0–3	Strømsgodset
Lisleby	2–0	Borg
Stavanger	3–1	Djerv 1919
Fram (Larvik)	0–3	Fredrikstad
Frigg	1–3	Mjøndalen
Raufoss	1–1 (a.e.t.)	Gjøa
Kvik (Trondheim)	1–2	Wing
Lillestrøm	1–0	Vålerengen
Lyn	5–0	Sandefjord BK
Nydalen	1–1 (a.e.t.)	Moss
Ranheim	1–0	Verdal
Sarpsborg	3–1	Vikersund
Skiold	0–1	Skeid
Start	2–2 (a.e.t.)	Viking
Replay: 9 September 1945
Gjøa	6–3	Raufoss
Moss	1–1 (a.e.t.)	Nydalen
Viking	3–1	Start
2nd replay: 13 September 1945
Nydalen	0–1 (a.e.t.) (Note: Played at Ullevaal Stadion in Oslo.)	Moss

== Fourth round ==
Team 1	Score	Team 2
16 September 1945
Årstad	3–2	Stavanger
Fredrikstad	10–1	Lillestrøm
Gjøa	3–4 (a.e.t.)	Kristiansund
Viking	0–6	Lisleby
Mjøndalen	0–1	Lyn
Moss	1–1 (a.e.t.)	Strømsgodset
Skeid	7–1	Ranheim
Wing	2–6	Sarpsborg
Replay: 19 September 1945
Strømsgodset	0–1	Moss

== Quarter-finals ==
Team 1	Score	Team 2
23 September 1945
Fredrikstad	4–0	Årstad
Lyn	6–0	Kristiansund
Lisleby	3–0	Moss
Sarpsborg	4–3	Skeid

== Semi-finals ==
Team 1	Score	Team 2
30 September 1945
Fredrikstad	3–0	Sarpsborg
Lyn	6–1	Lisleby

== Final ==
=== First match ===
14 October 1945

Fredrikstad	1–1 (a.e.t.)	Lyn
Brynildsen 46' (pen.)	Report	Osnes 19'

Ullevaal Stadion, Oslo
Attendance: 34,162
Referee: Haakon Engebretsen (Brage)

Fredrikstad:
GK	Hans Hansen
DF	Rolf Johannessen
DF	Bjørn Berger
MF	Gunnar Andreassen
MF	Erik Holmberg
MF	Reidar Olsen
FW	Thorleif Larsen
FW	Bjørn Spydevold
FW	Knut Brynildsen
FW	Kjell Moe	(substituted off) 47'
FW	Arne Ileby
Substitutions:
FW	Jacob Wilhems	(substituted on) 47'

Lyn:
GK	Tom Blohm
DF	Eugen Hansen
DF	Øivind Holmsen
MF	Eilert Eilertsen
MF	Kristian Henriksen
MF	Adalbert Kjellberg
FW	Marlow Bråthen
FW	John Sveinsson
FW	Knut Osnes
FW	Magnar Isaksen
FW	Arne Brustad

=== Replay match ===
28 October 1945

Fredrikstad	1–1 (a.e.t.)	Lyn
Ileby 84'	Report	Osnes 19'

Sarpsborg Stadion, Sarpsborg
Attendance: 18,000
Referee: Edvin Pedersen (Gjøa)

=== Second replay match ===
4 November 1945

Lyn	4–0	Fredrikstad
Sveinsson 17'; Bråthen 25', 30', 35'	Report

Bislett Stadion, Oslo
Attendance: 31,412
Referee: Nils Gundersen (Fram Larvik)

== See also ==
- 1945 in Norwegian football
