= 1949 Norwegian Football Cup =

Norgesmesterskapet i fotball for menn 1949

Tournament details
- Country: Norway
- Teams: 128 (main competition)

Final positions
- Champions: Sarpsborg (5th title)
- Runners-up: Skeid

The 1949 Norwegian Football Cup was the 44th season of the Norwegian annual knockout football tournament. The tournament was open for all members of NFF, except those from Northern Norway. The final was played at Ullevaal Stadion in Oslo on 23 October 1949, and was contested by the defending champions Sarpsborg and the one-time former winners Skeid. Sarpsborg successfully defended their title with a 3–1 victory, securing their fifth Norwegian Cup trophy.

== First round ==
Team 1	Score	Team 2
Asker	7–2	Rygge
Baune	1–2	Hardy
Birkebeineren	3–2	Storm
Borg	1–0	Herkules
Brage	1–2	Falken
Brann	4–1	Os
Brevik	0–4	Larvik Turn
Brodd	0–2	Nærbø
Brumunddal	1–5	Fremad Lillehammer
Clausenengen	3–2	Nordlandet
Djerv 1919	1–1 (a.e.t.)	Nordnes
Drammens BK	2–1	Nydalen
Eik	0–2	Drafn
Falk	1–6	Sarpsborg
Fram (Larvik)	5–0	Grane (Arendal)
Fredensborg	1–6	Ørn
Fredrikstad	7–0	Tofte
Freidig	1–0	Nidar
Geithus	5–1	Raufoss
Gjøa	1–2	Mjøndalen
Gjøvik-Lyn	8–1	Bøverbru
Hamar	4–2	Hof
Jerv	2–0	Donn
Jevnaker	4–0	Lillestrøm
Kapp	5–0	Varg
Kjelsås	2–0	Rapid
Klepp	1–1 (a.e.t.)	Flekkefjord
Kongsberg	3–0	Tollnes
Lillestrøm/Fram	2–0	HamKam
Lyn	4–1 (a.e.t.)	Askim
Mandalskameratene	0–2	Viking
Mesna	2–1	National
Molde	2–0	Ørsta
Moss	9–0	Skotterud
Nessegutten	6–2	Rosenborg
Odd	2–0	Strong
Pors	1–2	Stag
Rakkestad	6–0	Jordal
Ranheim	8–0	Wing
Reidulf	0–3	Lisleby
Rjukan	3–1	Ulefoss
Sagene	3–2	Strømmen
Sandaker	3–4	Steinberg
Sandefjord BK	6–0	Slemmestad
Selbak	5–0	Aasen
Skiens BK	1–2	Liull
Skogn	0–3	Kvik (Trondheim)
Solberg	2–3	Snøgg
Sparta	6–1	Fet
Stabæk	7–2	Tønsberg Turn
Start	2–3	AIK Lund
Stavanger	2–0	Vard
Stål	1–5	Ulf
Torp	1–0	Kvik (Halden)
Tønsberg-Kameratene	1–3	Frigg
Urædd	3–2	Skiens-Grane
Varegg	2–0	Djerv
Veblungsnes	1–4	Kristiansund
Verdal	5–3	Steinkjer
Vito	2–4	Skeid
Vålerengen	2–0	Greåker
Aalesund	4–1	Langevåg
Ålgård	4–0	Jarl
Årstad	3–1	Nymark
Replay
Flekkefjord	3–0	Klepp
Nordnes	2–1 (a.e.t.)	Djerv 1919

== Second round ==
Team 1	Score	Team 2
AIK Lund	1–3	Lyn
Borg	2–0	Rjukan
Drafn	1–0	Liull
Falken	1–0	Molde
Flekkefjord	1–0	Ålgård
Fremad Lillehammer	1–6	Sparta
Frigg	2–1	Moss
Gjøvik-Lyn	1–3	Drammens BK
Hamar	0–1	Freidig
Hardy	0–4	Årstad
Kapp	1–1 (a.e.t.)	Birkebeineren
Kristiansund	4–2	Verdal
Kvik (Trondheim)	5–2	Clausenengen
Larvik Turn	0–1	Jevnaker
Lillestrøm/Fram	0–6	Fredrikstad
Lisleby	1–2	Sagene
Mjøndalen	3–2	Asker
Nessegutten	1–0	Ranheim
Nordnes	1–2	Brann
Nærbø	1–2 (Note: Rematch after Nærbø protested a referee error in the first game.)	Stavanger
Odd	2–1	Kongsberg
Sandefjord BK	5–1	Stabæk
Sarpsborg	3–2	Geithus
Selbak	2–1	Stag
Skeid	6–1	Rakkestad
Snøgg	2–0	Jerv
Steinberg	0–1	Fram (Larvik)
Ulf	2–0	Varegg
Viking	2–1	Urædd
Vålerengen	7–0	Torp
Ørn	3–1	Kjelsås
Aalesund	3–2 (a.e.t.)	Mesna
Replay
Birkebeineren	3–7	Kapp
Stavanger	5–1	Nærbø

== Third round ==
Team 1	Score	Team 2
31 July 1949
Sparta	0–1	Frigg
Fredrikstad	2–0	Borg
Sagene	1–1 (a.e.t.)	Mjøndalen
Lyn	1–2	Jevnaker
Drammens BK	4–3	Selbak
Kapp	1–4	Vålerengen
Fram (Larvik)	1–0	Drafn
Odd	0–1	Sarpsborg
Ørn	5–1	Snøgg
Stavanger	1–1 (a.e.t.)	Sandefjord BK
Brann	4–2	Flekkefjord
Årstad	1–3	Skeid
Ulf	2–1 (a.e.t.)	Viking
Kristiansund	4–3	Falken
Aalesund	1–3	Kvik (Trondheim)
Freidig	3–2	Nessegutten
Replay: 10 August 1949
Mjøndalen	2–1	Sagene
Sandefjord BK	1–0	Stavanger

== Fourth round ==
Team 1	Score	Team 2
28 August 1949
Sarpsborg	8–1	Ulf
Frigg	2–0	Ørn
Skeid	8–0	Kristiansund
Vålerengen	5–1	Brann
Jevnaker	1–0 (a.e.t.)	Fram (Larvik)
Mjøndalen	1–1 (a.e.t.)	Freidig
Sandefjord BK	2–3	Drammens BK
Kvik (Trondheim)	0–1	Fredrikstad
Replay: 11 September 1949
Freidig	1–2	Mjøndalen

== Quarter-finals ==
Team 1	Score	Team 2
25 September 1949
Jevnaker	1–1 (a.e.t.)	Vålerengen
Drammens BK	2–5 (a.e.t.)	Skeid
Fredrikstad	2–1	Frigg
Sarpsborg	3–1	Mjøndalen
Replay: 2 October 1949
Vålerengen	3–1	Jevnaker

== Semi-finals ==
Team 1	Score	Team 2
9 October 1949
Skeid	2–2 (a.e.t.)	Fredrikstad
Sarpsborg	1–0	Vålerengen
Replay: 16 October 1949
Fredrikstad	1–2	Skeid

== Final ==
23 October 1949

Sarpsborg	3–1	Skeid
Yven 55'; K. Andersen 80'; Olsen 81'	Report	Mathiesen 25'

Ullevaal Stadion, Oslo
Attendance: 36,000
Referee: Gullik Hagajore (Torp)

== See also ==
- 1948–49 Norwegian Main League
- 1949 in Norwegian football
