= 1946 Norwegian Football Cup =

Norgesmesterskapet i fotball for menn 1946

Tournament details
- Country: Norway
- Teams: 128 (main competition)

Final positions
- Champions: Lyn (6th title)
- Runners-up: Fredrikstad

The 1946 Norwegian Football Cup was the 41st season of the Norwegian annual knockout football tournament. The tournament was open for all members of NFF, except those from Northern Norway. The final was played at Ullevaal Stadion in Oslo on 13 October 1946, and was contested by the same two teams as in last year's final. The defending champions Lyn won 3-2 after extra time against last year's losing finalist Fredrikstad and secured their sixth title.

== First round ==
Team 1	Score	Team 2
Asker	0–2	Reidulf
BFG	1–3	Oslo-Odd
Bjart	0–5	Start
Bjørkelangen	0–2	Nydalen
Borre	3–1	Borgen Sarpsborg
Bøn	1–3	Sarpsborg
Clausenengen	0–3	Aalesund
Djerv	5–0	Stord
Djerv 1919	1–3	Vard
Drafn	6–1	Liv
Drammens BK	1–1 (a.e.t.)	Rapid
Falken (Høyanger)	7–1	Fjellkameratene
Flekkefjord	3–0	Donn
Fredrikstad	5–0	Kolbotn
Fremad Lillehammer	6–0	Eidsvold Turn
Frigg	0–1	B.14
Gimsøy	4–0	Grane (Arendal)
Gjøa	1–2	Skarnes
HamKam	5–0	Rena
Hardy	1–4	Årstad
Jevnaker	1–1 (a.e.t.)	Fram (Larvik)
Kapp	2–2 (a.e.t.)	Skiold
Kongsvinger	0–5	Vålerengen
Kvik (Halden)	3–0	Jordal
Kvik (Trondheim)	5–2	Røros
Larvik Turn	3–2	Liull
Lillestrøm	1–1 (a.e.t.)	Mesna
Lyn (Trondheim)	2–2 (a.e.t.)	Brage
Løren	3–2 (Note: Rematch after protest.)	Lisleby
Minde	0–5	Brann
Molde	2–3	Kristiansund
Moss	8–0	Aurskog
Nannestad	0–6	Gjøvik-Lyn
National	0–3	Rosenborg
Neset	1–0	Falken (Trondheim)
Orkanger	1–5	Freidig
Rakkestad	0–2	Kjelsås
Ranheim	6–0	Wing
Raufoss	1–1 (a.e.t.)	Kolbu
Rollon	4–2	Hødd
Sandefjord BK	4–0	Akademisk
Sander	1–5	Lyn
Selbak	1–1 (a.e.t.)	Strømmen
Skeid	9–1	Nordstrand
Skiens BK	0–2	Sandaker
Slemmestad	0–1	Birkebeineren
Snøgg	3–0	Fredensborg
Solberg	1–2 (a.e.t.)	Borg
Sparta	7–0	Tune
Spartacus	0–1	Varg
Sprint-Jeløy	0–4	Storm
Stavanger	8–0	Bjergsted
Strømsgodset	4–1	Ørn
Sverre	4–3	Nidarvoll
Tønsberg Turn	3–1	Stabæk
Ulefoss	2–2 (a.e.t.)	Pors
Urædd	4–2 (a.e.t.)	Aasen
Vardal	0–9	Mjøndalen
Verdal	5–3	Nessegutten
Vestfossen	2–2 (a.e.t.)	Odd
Vikersund	4–1	Tønsberg-Kameratene
Viking	7–1	Egersund
Voss	4–0	Pallas
Ålgård	2–0	Brodd
Replay
Brage	2–5	Lyn (Trondheim)
Fram (Larvik)	1–2	Jevnaker
Kolbu	2–3	Raufoss
Lisleby	3–2	Løren
Mesna	0–1 (a.e.t.)	Lillestrøm
Odd	3–2	Vestfossen
Pors	4–1	Ulefoss
Rapid	3–0	Drammens BK
Skiold	0–6	Kapp
Strømmen	0–1	Selbak

== Second round ==
Team 1	Score	Team 2
Birkebeineren	6–0	Oslo-Odd
Borg	1–5	Sparta
Brann	1–2	Ålgård
Djerv	2–3	Voss
Freidig	5–0	Sverre
Gjøvik-Lyn	1–2	Selbak
Jevnaker	3–2	Strømsgodset
Kapp	0–9	Skeid
Kjelsås	3–0	Drafn
Kristiansund	3–0	Rollon
Lisleby	2–1	Varg
Lyn	3–0	Raufoss
Mjøndalen	2–1	HamKam
Neset	1–0	Lyn (Trondheim)
Nydalen	1–0	Kvik (Halden)
Odd	0–9	Larvik Turn
Pors	4–1	Borre
Rapid	1–0	B.14
Reidulf	2–3	Moss
Rosenborg	2–4	Ranheim
Sandaker	1–3	Urædd
Sandefjord BK	4–1	Vikersund
Sarpsborg	5–0	Gimsøy
Skarnes	1–2	Fredrikstad
Start	0–3	Stavanger
Storm	1–0 (a.e.t.)	Lillestrøm
Tønsberg Turn	0–3	Snøgg
Vard	2–1	Årstad
Verdal	0–0 (a.e.t.)	Kvik (Trondheim)
Viking	6–0	Flekkefjord
Vålerengen	8–1	Fremad Lillehammer
Aalesund	2–1	Falken (Høyanger)
Replay
Kvik (Trondheim)	4–1	Verdal

== Third round ==
Team 1	Score	Team 2
25 August 1946
Aalesund	2–3	Freidig
Ålgård	2–3	Mjøndalen
Stavanger	4–1	Birkebeineren
Fredrikstad	7–1	Storm
Jevnaker	0–0 (a.e.t.)	Lyn
Voss	2–1	Kjelsås
Kristiansund	4–1	Neset
Kvik (Trondheim)	2–1	Sandefjord BK
Larvik Turn	5–1	Lisleby
Moss	3–1	Pors
Selbak	1–0	Nydalen
Ranheim	2–1	Rapid
Urædd	1–1 (a.e.t.)	Sarpsborg
Skeid	5–1	Vard
Snøgg	3–2	Viking
Sparta	3–2	Vålerengen
Replay: 1 September 1946
Lyn	8–1	Jevnaker
Sarpsborg	4–0	Urædd

== Fourth round ==
Team 1	Score	Team 2
8 September 1946
Kristiansund	0–4	Fredrikstad
Freidig	2–3	Selbak
Lyn	2–1	Kvik (Trondheim)
Larvik Turn	1–2 (a.e.t.)	Moss
Mjøndalen	3–2	Snøgg
Sarpsborg	3–2 (a.e.t.)	Ranheim
Voss	0–6	Skeid
Stavanger	1–3	Sparta

== Quarter-finals ==
Team 1	Score	Team 2
22 September 1946
Skeid	0–3	Fredrikstad
Selbak	0–2	Lyn
Moss	0–0 (a.e.t.)	Mjøndalen
Sarpsborg	2–0	Sparta
Replay: 29 September 1946
Mjøndalen	3–1	Moss

== Semi-finals ==
Team 1	Score	Team 2
29 September 1946
Fredrikstad	2–0	Mjøndalen
6 October 1946
Lyn	1–0	Sarpsborg

== Final ==
13 October 1946

Lyn	3–2 (a.e.t.)	Fredrikstad
Osnes 49'; Brustad 96'; Pettersen 119'	Report; Report 2	Ileby 25'; Brynildsen 97'

Ullevaal Stadion, Oslo
Attendance: 35,000
Referee: Sverre Hermansen (Fjellkameratene)

== See also ==
- 1946 in Norwegian football
