= 1946 in Norwegian football =

Football in Norway
Men's football
- NM: Lyn

Results from Norwegian football in 1946.

== Norwegian Cup ==
=== Final ===
13 October 1946

Lyn	3–2 (a.e.t.)	Fredrikstad
Osnes 49'; Brustad 96'; Pettersen 119'	Report; Report 2	Ileby 25'; Brynildsen 97'

Ullevaal Stadion, Oslo
Attendance: 35,000
Referee: Sverre Hermansen (Fjellkameratene)

== Northern Norwegian Cup ==
=== Final ===
Mjølner	3–2	Narvik/Nor
	Report

== National team ==
16 June 1946 Friendly	Norway	2–1	Denmark	Aker, Norway
18:00 (UTC+1); Match 146	Nordahl 9'; Osnes 58'	Report	J. L. Sørensen 24'	Stadium: Ullevaal Stadion; Attendance: 34,000; Referee: George Clark (England)

28 June 1946 Friendly	Norway	12–0	Finland	Bergen, Norway
18:00 (UTC+1); Match 147	Thoresen 15', 20', 62'; Sæthrang 18', 31', 69'; Osnes 30', 89'; Kvammen 34', 80'; Nordahl 59', 81'	Report		Stadium: Brann Stadion; Attendance: 22,000; Referee: Gunnar Dahlner (Sweden)

8 July 1946 Friendly	Denmark	2–0	Norway	Copenhagen, Denmark
19:00 (UTC+2); Match 148	Præst 38'; A. Sørensen 69' (pen.)	Report		Stadium: Københavns Idrætspark; Attendance: 39,000; Referee: John Oskar Nilsson (Sweden)

28 July 1946 Friendly	Luxembourg	3–2	Norway	Luxembourg City, Luxembourg
17:30 (UTC+2); Match 149	Schumacher 60', 66'; Pauly 70'	Report	Johannessen 30'; Dahlen 82'	Stadium: Stade Municipal; Attendance: 9,000; Referee: Laurent Franken (Belgium)

15 September 1946 Friendly	Norway	0–3	Sweden	Aker, Norway
13:00 (UTC+1); Match 150		Report	Nyberg 33'; Gren 75'; Karlsson 84'	Stadium: Ullevaal Stadion; Attendance: 35,321; Referee: Axel Asmussen (Denmark)

20 October 1946 Friendly	Denmark	7–1	Norway	Copenhagen, Denmark
13:30 (UTC+1); Match 151	Hansen 20', 52', 78', 89'; Sørensen 62'; Præst 65' (pen.), 85'	Report	Brynildsen 42' (pen.)	Stadium: Københavns Idrætspark; Attendance: 39,650; Referee: Folke Nyberg (Finland)
