= 1949 in Norwegian football =

Football in Norway
Men's football
- Hovedserien: Fredrikstad
- NM: Sarpsborg

Results from Norwegian football in 1949.

== Hovedserien 1948–49 ==
=== Group A ===
Pos	Team	Pld	W	D	L	GF	GA	GD	Pts	Qualification or relegation
1	Vålerengen	14	9	2	3	23	13	+10	20	Qualification for the championship final
2	Sparta	14	9	1	4	30	18	+12	19	
3	Viking	14	7	4	3	25	18	+7	18	
4	Ålgard	14	7	3	4	18	17	+1	17	
5	Skeid	14	7	0	7	34	25	+9	14	
6	Ørn	14	6	2	6	25	23	+2	14	
7	Pors (R)	14	1	4	9	11	34	−23	6	Relegation
8	Brann (R)	14	1	2	11	25	43	−18	4	Relegation

Source: RSSSF
(R) Relegated

=== Group B ===
Pos	Team	Pld	W	D	L	GF	GA	GD	Pts	Qualification or relegation
1	Fredrikstad (C)	14	10	2	2	29	10	+19	22	Qualification for the championship final
2	Sarpsborg	14	7	4	3	26	14	+12	18	
3	Lyn	14	5	6	3	19	17	+2	16	
4	Sandefjord	14	5	5	4	25	20	+5	15	
5	Mjøndalen	14	6	0	8	18	26	−8	12	
6	Storm	14	3	6	5	15	24	−9	12	
7	Freidig (R)	14	3	3	8	15	27	−12	9	Relegation
8	Sandaker (R)	14	3	2	9	22	31	−9	8	Relegation

Source: RSSSF
(C) Champions; (R) Relegated

=== Championship final ===
June 6: Vålerengen-Fredrikstad 1-3

June 12: Fredrikstad-Vålerengen 3-0 (agg. 6-1)

== 1948–49 First division ==
=== District I ===
Pos	Team	Pld	W	D	L	GF	GA	GD	Pts	Qualification or relegation
1	Selbak	14	11	2	1	34	12	+22	24	Play-off
2	Lisleby	14	10	0	4	37	17	+20	20	
3	Kvik Halden	14	6	4	4	22	13	+9	16	
4	Rakkestad	14	6	4	4	28	29	−1	16	
5	Rapid	14	7	1	6	27	26	+1	15	
6	Moss	14	5	4	5	30	22	+8	14	
7	Gleng	14	1	2	11	12	41	−29	4	
8	Sprint	14	0	3	11	15	45	−30	3	Relegated

=== District II, Group A ===
Pos	Team	Pld	W	D	L	GF	GA	GD	Pts	Qualification or relegation
1	Frigg	14	8	4	2	29	9	+20	20	Play-off
2	Drafn	14	7	5	2	25	18	+7	19	
3	Sagene	14	6	4	4	19	19	0	16	
4	Slemmestad	14	6	3	5	33	29	+4	15	
5	Geithus	14	6	3	5	21	18	+3	15	
6	Nydalen	14	5	3	6	22	24	−2	13	
7	Jevnaker	14	3	5	6	14	25	−11	11	Relegated
8	Skiold	14	0	3	11	4	25	−21	3	Relegated

=== District II, Group B ===
Pos	Team	Pld	W	D	L	GF	GA	GD	Pts	Qualification or relegation
1	Strømmen	14	10	2	2	41	22	+19	22	Play-off
2	Drammens BK	14	8	2	4	41	20	+21	18	
3	Solberg	14	8	2	4	33	25	+8	18	
4	Birkebeineren	14	8	2	4	26	22	+4	18	
5	Kongsberg	14	7	1	6	25	18	+7	15	
6	Varg	14	5	3	6	24	28	−4	13	
7	Strong	14	3	0	11	16	33	−17	6	Relegated
8	Eiker	14	0	2	12	16	54	−38	2	Relegated

=== District III ===
Pos	Team	Pld	W	D	L	GF	GA	GD	Pts	Qualification or relegation
1	Kapp	14	11	2	1	35	21	+14	24	Play-off
2	Fremad	14	6	4	4	33	31	+2	16	
3	Hamarkameratene	14	5	4	5	28	24	+4	14	
4	Hamar IL	14	7	0	7	23	22	+1	14	
5	Gjøvik/Lyn	14	3	7	4	26	26	0	13	
6	Mesna	14	5	3	6	26	33	−7	13	
7	Raufoss	14	3	4	7	25	29	−4	10	Relegated
8	Ottestad	14	3	2	9	31	41	−10	8	Relegated

=== District IV, Group A ===
Pos	Team	Pld	W	D	L	GF	GA	GD	Pts	Qualification or relegation
1	Fram Larvik	14	10	4	0	34	11	+23	24	Play-off
2	Skiens/Grane	14	8	2	4	29	19	+10	18	
3	Odd	14	8	1	5	37	17	+20	17	
4	Brevik	14	5	3	6	29	31	−2	13	
5	Ulefoss	14	4	4	6	26	30	−4	12	
6	Rjukan	14	5	2	7	25	36	−11	12	
7	Tønsberg Turn	14	5	1	8	24	26	−2	11	Relegated
8	Tollnes	14	2	1	11	15	49	−34	5	Relegated

=== District IV, Group B ===
Pos	Team	Pld	W	D	L	GF	GA	GD	Pts	Qualification or relegation
1	Borg	14	9	2	3	38	15	+23	20	Play-off
2	Larvik Turn	14	9	1	4	38	13	+25	19	
3	Herkules	14	7	3	4	41	22	+19	17	
4	Snøgg	14	5	5	4	30	25	+5	15	
5	Tønsbergkameratene	14	6	3	5	25	27	−2	15	
6	Skiens BK	14	4	4	6	23	30	−7	12	
7	Urædd	14	4	3	7	27	34	−7	11	Relegated
8	Holmestrand	14	1	1	12	20	76	−56	3	Relegated

=== District V, Group A ===
Pos	Team	Pld	W	D	L	GF	GA	GD	Pts	Qualification or relegation
1	Jerv	12	9	1	2	40	18	+22	19	Play-off
2	Flekkefjord	12	6	2	4	22	14	+8	14	
3	Start	12	5	3	4	13	15	−2	13	
4	Grane/Arendal	12	4	2	6	13	16	−3	10	
5	Donn	12	5	0	7	19	23	−4	10	
6	Mandalskameratene	12	4	2	6	13	29	−16	10	
7	Vigør	12	3	2	7	9	14	−5	8	Relegated

=== District V, Group B ===
Pos	Team	Pld	W	D	L	GF	GA	GD	Pts	Qualification or relegation
1	Djerv 1919	14	11	2	1	27	11	+16	24	Play-off
2	Stavanger IF	14	9	4	1	40	15	+25	22	
3	Ulf	14	8	3	3	33	19	+14	19	
4	Nærbø	14	6	2	6	20	19	+1	14	
5	Jarl	14	3	3	8	17	33	−16	9	
6	Vard	14	3	2	9	18	24	−6	8	
7	Staal	14	2	4	8	17	31	−14	8	Relegated
8	Brodd	14	3	2	9	23	43	−20	8	Relegated

=== District VI ===
Pos	Team	Pld	W	D	L	GF	GA	GD	Pts	Qualification or relegation
1	Årstad	10	8	1	1	23	10	+13	17	Play-off
2	Varegg	10	7	0	3	25	13	+12	14	
3	Hardy	10	5	0	5	15	20	−5	10	
4	Djerv	10	3	2	5	22	21	+1	8	
5	Nymark	10	3	0	7	16	21	−5	6	Relegated
6	Voss	10	2	1	7	9	25	−16	5	Relegated

=== District VII ===
Pos	Team	Pld	W	D	L	GF	GA	GD	Pts	Qualification or relegation
1	Molde	10	6	1	3	21	9	+12	23 (Note: 10 bonus points?)	Play-off
2	Clausenengen	10	5	2	3	21	14	+7	12	
3	Kristiansund	10	3	6	1	21	17	+4	12	
4	Aalesund	10	4	3	3	22	17	+5	11	
5	Rollon	10	4	1	5	15	19	−4	9	
6	Herd	10	1	1	8	10	34	−24	3	Relegated

=== District VIII ===
Pos	Team	Pld	W	D	L	GF	GA	GD	Pts	Qualification or relegation
1	Ranheim	14	10	3	1	28	7	+21	23	Play-off
2	Kvik Trondheim	14	10	2	2	35	10	+25	22	
3	Falken	14	6	3	5	30	21	+9	15	
4	Nessegutten	14	5	4	5	24	31	−7	14	
5	Brage	14	5	3	6	22	22	0	13	
6	Verdal	14	5	0	9	24	37	−13	10	
7	Steinkjer	14	3	2	9	20	35	−15	8	Relegated
8	Neset	14	2	3	9	14	34	−20	7	Relegated

=== Play-off preliminary round ===
May 26: Djerv 1919 - Jerv 2-1

May 29: Fram - Borg 2-0

June 1: Strømmen - Frigg 1-1

May 29: Jerv - Djerv 1919 2-3 (agg. 3-5)

June 1: Borg - Fram 2-1 (agg. 2-3)

June 8: Frigg - Strømmen 0-2 (agg. 1-3)

=== Play-off, Group A ===
June 5: Selbak - Molde 3-0

Ranheim - Kapp 6-2

June 12: Kapp - Selbak 0-1

Ranheim - Molde 2-0

June 19: Selbak - Ranheim

Molde – Kapp

Pos	Team	Pld	W	D	L	GF	GA	GD	Pts	Promotion
1	Ranheim	2	2	0	0	8	2	+6	4	Promoted
2	Selbak	2	2	0	0	4	0	+4	4	Promoted
3	Kapp	2	0	0	2	2	7	−5	0	
4	Molde	2	0	0	2	0	5	−5	0	

=== Play-off, Group B ===
June 5: Årstad - Djerv 1919 3-1

June 12: Strømmen - Årstad 1-0

Fram - Djerv 1919 0-1

June 19: Djerv 1919 - Strømmen 0-4

Fram - Årstad 3-0

June 22: Strømmen - Fram 2-2

Pos	Team	Pld	W	D	L	GF	GA	GD	Pts	Promotion
1	Strømmen	3	2	1	0	7	2	+5	5	Promoted
2	Fram Larvik	3	1	1	1	5	3	+2	3	Promoted
3	Årstad	3	1	0	2	3	5	−2	2	
4	Djerv 1919	3	1	0	2	2	7	−5	2	

== Promoted to first division ==
AIK Lund, Asker, Brumunddal, Bryne, Braatt, Eik, Falk, Gjøvik SK, Jordal, Kjelsås, Kopervik, Lillestrøm, Mysen, Os, Rosenborg, Skotfoss, Stag, Stjørdal and Tistedalen.

== Norwegian Cup ==
=== Final ===
23 October 1949

Sarpsborg	3–1	Skeid
Yven 55'; K. Andersen 80'; Olsen 81'	Report	Mathiesen 25'

Ullevaal Stadion, Oslo
Attendance: 36,000
Referee: Gullik Hagajore (Torp)

== Northern Norwegian Cup ==
=== Final ===
Tromsø	3–1	Bodø/Glimt
	Report

== National team ==
18 May Friendly	Norway	1–4	England	Oslo, Norway
19:00 (UTC+1); Match 165	Andresen 50'	Report	Mullen 5'; Finney 38'; Spydevold 60' (o.g.); Morris 70'	Stadium: Ullevaal Stadion; Attendance: 32,874; Referee: John Erik Andersson (Sweden)

19 June Friendly	Norway	1–3	Yugoslavia	Oslo, Norway
18:15 (UTC+1); Match 166	Bredesen 60'	Report	Mitić 76'; Bobek 84'; Čajkovski 88'	Stadium: Ullevaal Stadion; Attendance: 23,163; Referee: Klaas Schipper (Netherlands)

8 July 1948–51 Nordic Championship	Finland	1–1	Norway	Helsinki, Finland
(UTC+2); Match 167	Vaihela 33'	Report	Sørensen 89'	Stadium: Helsinki Olympic Stadium; Attendance: 11,264; Referee: Axel Asmussen (Denmark)

11 September 1948–51 Nordic Championship	Norway	0–2	Denmark	Oslo, Norway
13:15 (UTC+1); Match 168		Report	Reckendorff 28'; J. P. Hansen 84'	Stadium: Ullevaal Stadion; Attendance: 38,085; Referee: Wolf Karni (Finland)

2 October 1948–51 Nordic Championship	Sweden	3–3	Norway	Solna, Sweden
15:00 (UTC+1); Match 169	Lindskog 60'; Jeppson 76'; Simonsson 79'	Report	Bredesen 15', 89'; Hennum 75'	Stadium: Råsunda Stadium; Attendance: 37,750; Referee: Valdemar Laursen (Denmark)
