= Reidar Olsen =

Norwegian footballer (1910–1997)

Personal information
- Full name: Reidar Brede Olsen
- Date of birth: 20 September 1910
- Place of birth: Fredrikstad, Norway
- Date of death: 1 September 1997 (aged 86)
- Position: Midfielder

Senior career*
Years	Team	Apps	(Gls)
1931	Fredrikstad		
1938–1946	Fredrikstad		

International career
1945	Norway	2	(0)
- * Club domestic league appearances and goals

Reidar Brede Olsen (20 September 1910 – 1 September 1997) was a Norwegian footballer who played as a midfielder for Fredrikstad. He was capped twice for Norway. Olsen had two spells in the Fredrikstad first-team squad, once in 1931 and another between 1938 and 1946, and won two Norwegian league titles and two Norwegian Cup while playing for the club. He also played bandy for Fredrikstad.

== Career ==
Olsen was born in Fredrikstad and made his debut for Fredrikstad FK in 1931. After an injury sidelined him, he started to play for Fredrikstad FK's bandy team. He scored two goals in the first-ever bandy match played in Fredrikstad in 1935 and was a part of the Fredrikstad team that won the district championship (Norwegian: Kretsmesterskap) in bandy in 1936.

In 1938, Olsen was back in the first-team squad of Fredrikstad's football department, and won both the 1937–38 League of Norway and the 1938 Norwegian Football Cup. Olsen was also a part of the team that won the Norwegian league during the 1938–39 season and the Norwegian Cup in 1940. In the 1940 Norwegian Cup Final against Skeid, Olsen was named as one of Fredrikstad's best players along with Gunnar Andreassen by Fredriksstad Blad.

No organized football was played between 1940 and 1945 because of the Second World War. Olsen was at that time involved in the Norwegian resistance movement Milorg. After the war was over, the Norwegian national team was meeting Denmark in a friendly match, which was dubbed "the independence match". The Football Association of Norway decided to primarily call-up players from the reigning Norwegian Cup champions, Fredrikstad. Six Fredrikstad-players started the match, and Thorleif Larsen, Bjørn Spydevold, Kjell Moe and Olsen made their international debut. Aged 34 years, 11 months, Olsen is the second oldest player ever to have made the debut for the Norwegian national time; Kjell Moe who was almost one year his senior and played in the same match being the oldest. Olsen made another appearances for the national team in the 10–0 loss against Sweden in Stockholm in October 1945.

Olsen played all three matches against Lyn, when Fredrikstad lost the 1945 Norwegian Football Cup Final. After his retirement, Olsen was head coach of Østsiden IL between 1948 and 1951 and in 1954. He was also head coach of Fredrikstad in 1963.

== Personal life ==
Olsen's brother, Ivar, was playing as a goalkeeper when Fredrikstad won their first-ever Norwegian Cup in 1932. Reidar Olsen died in 1997.
