= 1940 in Norwegian football =

Football in Norway
Men's football
- Norgesserien: none
- NM: Fredrikstad

Results from Norwegian football in 1940.

== Norgesserien 1939/40 ==
Because of World War II, Norgesserien 1939/40 was abandoned after the winter break following the German invasion of Norway on April 9, 1940.

=== District I ===
Pos	Team	Pld	W	D	L	GF	GA	GD	Pts
1	Moss	8	5	2	1	20	10	+10	12
2	Sarpsborg	7	5	0	2	26	9	+17	10
3	Fredrikstad	8	4	2	2	27	16	+11	10
4	Selbak	7	3	1	3	12	22	−10	7
5	Torp	7	3	0	4	15	14	+1	6
6	Kvik (Halden)	7	1	2	4	10	19	−9	4
7	Lisleby	8	1	1	6	8	28	−20	3

=== District II, Group A ===
Pos	Team	Pld	W	D	L	GF	GA	GD	Pts
1	Mjøndalen	8	7	1	0	24	3	+21	15
2	Gjøa	8	3	3	2	18	15	+3	9
3	Skeid	8	4	0	4	23	23	0	8
4	Strong	9	4	0	5	18	18	0	8
5	Skiold	8	3	1	4	18	19	−1	7
6	Jevnaker	9	3	0	6	22	32	−10	6
7	Solberg	8	2	1	5	14	27	−13	5

=== District II, Group B ===
Pos	Team	Pld	W	D	L	GF	GA	GD	Pts
1	Lyn	7	6	0	1	30	10	+20	12
2	Frigg	8	4	2	2	25	17	+8	10
3	Drafn	8	4	1	3	17	14	+3	9
4	Nydalen	8	3	3	2	17	16	+1	9
5	Strømsgodset	8	3	1	4	11	22	−11	7
6	Vålerengen	7	1	2	4	8	15	−7	4
7	Vikersund	8	1	1	6	11	25	−14	3

=== District III ===
Pos	Team	Pld	W	D	L	GF	GA	GD	Pts
1	Hamar IL	9	7	2	0	28	6	+22	16
2	Gjøvik/Lyn	10	6	2	2	34	13	+21	14
3	Vardal	10	5	2	3	17	22	−5	12
4	Briskebyen	9	5	1	3	21	14	+7	11
5	Fremad	9	1	4	4	5	15	−10	6
6	Kapp	10	1	2	7	9	30	−21	4
7	Raufoss	9	1	1	7	15	29	−14	3

=== District IV, Group A ===
Pos	Team	Pld	W	D	L	GF	GA	GD	Pts
1	Odd	9	7	2	0	32	6	+26	16
2	Fram (Larvik)	9	6	2	1	28	14	+14	14
3	Tønsberg Turn	9	5	1	3	21	16	+5	11
4	Urædd	9	5	1	3	19	16	+3	11
5	Skiens BK	8	4	0	4	16	16	0	8
6	Ulefoss	9	1	0	8	8	22	−14	2
7	Borg	9	0	0	9	9	43	−34	0

=== District IV; Group B ===
Pos	Team	Pld	W	D	L	GF	GA	GD	Pts
1	Ørn	9	5	3	1	18	11	+7	13
2	Snøgg	9	5	2	2	18	13	+5	12
3	Skiens-Grane	9	4	3	2	28	14	+14	11
4	Tønsbergkam.	9	5	0	4	28	20	+8	10
5	Storm	10	3	2	5	20	25	−5	8
6	Pors	9	3	1	5	15	19	−4	7
7	Sandefjord	9	1	1	7	17	42	−25	3

=== District V, Group A ===
Pos	Team	Pld	W	D	L	GF	GA	GD	Pts
1	Donn	7	5	1	1	21	11	+10	11
2	Start	7	3	4	0	11	7	+4	10
3	Grane (Arendal)	8	3	0	5	14	13	+1	6
4	Flekkefjord	7	2	1	4	10	14	−4	5
5	Mandalskam.	7	2	1	4	9	14	−5	5
6	Vigør	6	2	1	3	8	14	−6	5

=== District V, Group B ===
Pos	Team	Pld	W	D	L	GF	GA	GD	Pts
1	Viking	8	7	1	0	31	8	+23	15
2	Stavanger IF	9	6	1	2	22	18	+4	13
3	Egersund	9	5	1	3	19	20	−1	11
4	Vard	9	4	1	4	17	17	0	9
5	Ålgård	9	3	2	4	18	19	−1	8
6	Brodd	9	1	2	6	9	24	−15	4
7	Ulf	9	1	0	8	9	19	−10	2

=== District VI ===
Pos	Team	Pld	W	D	L	GF	GA	GD	Pts
1	Hardy	7	6	0	1	22	9	+13	12
2	Voss	7	4	0	3	19	13	+6	8
3	Brann	7	3	0	4	15	16	−1	6
4	Djerv	7	3	0	4	15	16	−1	6
5	Årstad	7	3	0	4	11	23	−12	6
6	Pallas	7	2	0	5	14	19	−5	4

=== District VII ===
Pos	Team	Pld	W	D	L	GF	GA	GD	Pts
1	Kristiansund	5	5	0	0	31	6	+25	10
2	Aalesund	6	5	0	1	19	11	+8	10
3	Clausenengen	5	1	2	2	10	19	−9	4
4	Braatt	5	1	1	3	12	12	0	3
5	Rollon	5	1	1	3	10	23	−13	3
6	Molde	6	1	0	5	8	19	−11	2

=== District VIII ===
Pos	Team	Pld	W	D	L	GF	GA	GD	Pts
1	Neset	9	6	2	1	24	7	+17	14
2	Kvik (Tr.heim)	9	6	1	2	24	15	+9	13
3	Ranheim	9	4	3	2	15	8	+7	11
4	Rosenborg	9	3	2	4	21	23	−2	8
5	Steinkjer	10	3	2	5	19	30	−11	8
6	Brage	9	2	1	6	19	23	−4	5
7	National	9	2	1	6	13	29	−16	5

== Norwegian Cup ==
=== Final ===
13 October 1940

Fredrikstad	3–0	Skeid
Ileby 36', 51'; Brynildsen 70' (pen.)	Report

Ullevaal Stadion, Oslo
Attendance: 31,410
Referee: Thorleiv Nordbø (Frigg)
