= Kjell Moe =

Norwegian footballer (1909-1999)

Personal information
- Full name: Kjell Moe
- Date of birth: 27 October 1909
- Place of birth: Fredrikstad, Norway
- Date of death: 8 December 1999 (aged 90)

Senior career*
Years	Team	Apps	(Gls)
–1938	Gresvik		
1938–1945	Fredrikstad		

International career
1945	Norway	2	(1)
- * Club domestic league appearances and goals

Kjell Moe (27 October 1909 – 8 December 1999) was a Norwegian footballer who played for Fredrikstad between 1938 and 1945. He won two Norwegian league titles and one Norwegian Cup. He was capped twice and scored one goal for Norway in 1945; aged 35 at the time he is the oldest player to make his debut for the Norwegian national team.

== Football career ==
Moe was born in Fredrikstad, and played for Gresvik before he transferred to Fredrikstad FK in 1938. Moe was part of the team that won the Norwegian league in the 1937–38 season and the 1938–39 season. He also won the Norwegian Cup in 1940 where Skeid was beaten in the final; a journalist from Morgenbladet claimed that Moe was one of Fredrikstad's best players in the final.

During the Second World War, no organized football was played, and when the Football Association of Norway was to select a national team squad for the first international match after the war, they decided to primarily call-up players from the reigning Norwegian champions, Fredrikstad. Norway started the match against Denmark on 26 August 1945, which was dubbed "the independence match", with six Fredrikstad-players with four of them Moe, Thorleif Larsen, Bjørn Spydevold and Reidar Olsen making their international debut. Aged 35 years and 305 days, Moe is the oldest player to make his debut for the Norwegian national team, while Olsen is the second-oldest debutant for Norway. Moe scored one goal in his debut, which Denmark won 4–2. He also played Norway's next match, which Denmark won 5–1 and this was his last international match.

Moe was injured in the first match of the 1945 Norwegian Football Cup Final against Lyn, and was unable to play the rematch in Sarpsborg which Lyn won. The injury also ended his football career.

== Personal life ==
His brothers Sten and Sverre had been key players for Fredrikstad for several years when Kjell joined the team in 1938, and a fourth brother, Thorleif, played for the team before he emigrated to the United States in 1923. Sverre's son Finn did also play for Fredrikstad' first team.

Moe died in 1999.
