= Reidar Amble Ommundsen =

Norwegian footballer and skier (1890–1940)

Reidar Amble-Ommundsen
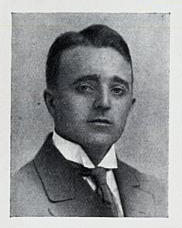
- Reidar Amble-Ommundsen in 1925

Personal information
- Nationality: Norwegian
- Born: 17 March 1890 Sørvågen, Flakstad, Norway
- Died: 26 December 1940 (aged 50) Oslo, Norway

Sport
- Sport: Skiing

Achievements and titles
- Personal bests: 54 m (177 ft); Mjøndalen, Norway (7 February 1915)

Reidar Amble Ommundsen (17 March 1890 – 26 December 1940) was a Norwegian ski jumper and soccer player.

== Career ==
In 1911 he won the Norwegian soccer cup final 5–2, with his club Lyn Fotball against IF Urædd.

On 7 February 1915 he set the ski jumping world record distance of 54 metres (177 ft) at Vikkollen hill in Mjøndalen, Norway.

== Ski jumping world record ==
Date	Hill	Location	Metres	Feet
7 February 1915	Vikkollen	Mjøndalen, Norway	54	177
