= Vikkollen =

Ski jump in Mjøndalen, Buskerud, Norway

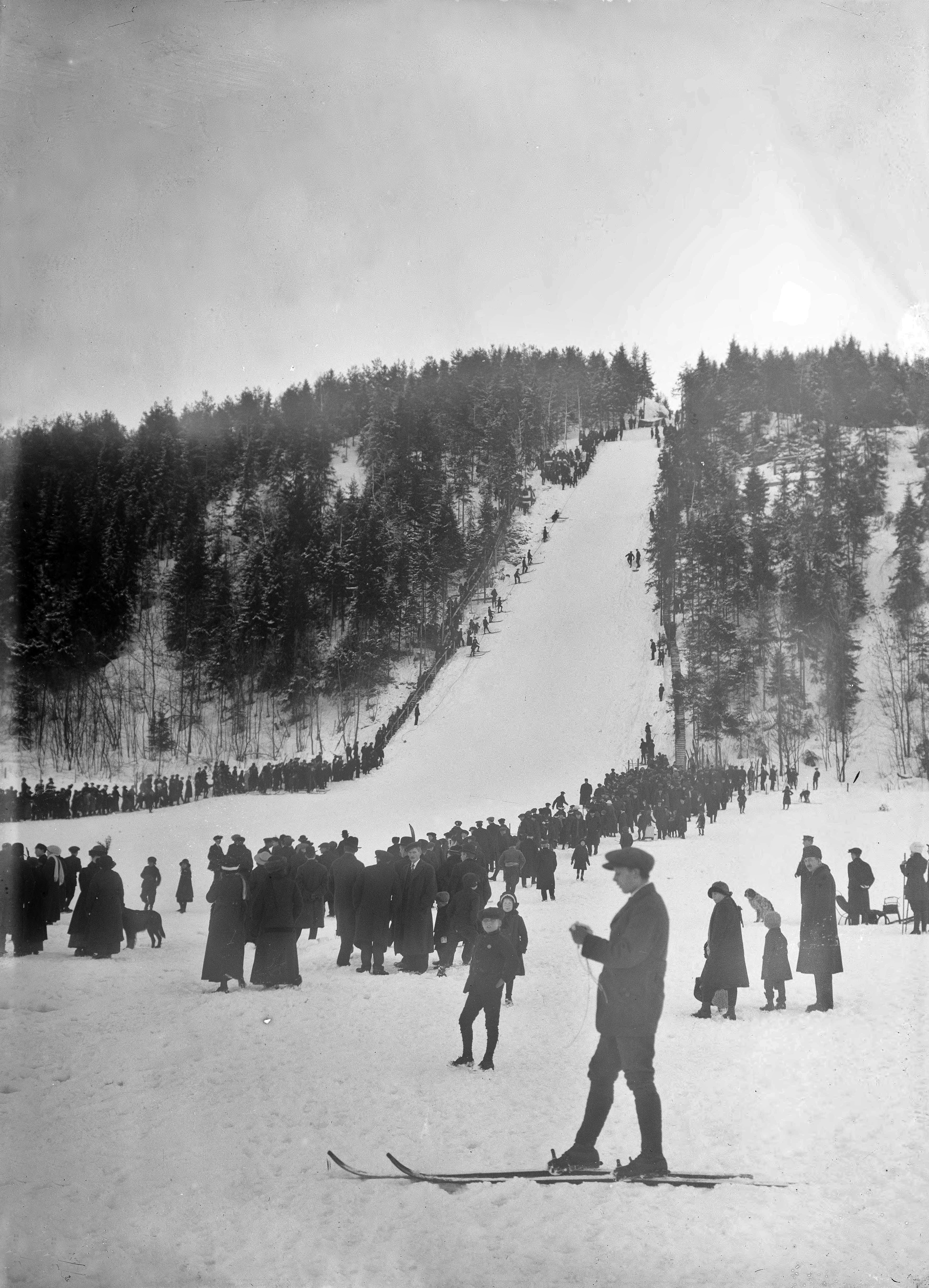
- Vikkollen, 1916
- Location: Mjøndalen, Norway
- Coordinates: 59°44′23.3″N 10°00′10.4″E
- Operator: Mjøndalen IF
- Opened: 1914
- Renovated: 1933, 1950
- Closed: 1966

Size
- K–point: K80
- Hill record: 86.5 m (284 ft); Paavo Lukkariniemi (1960)

Vikkollen (Vikkollbakken, or. Wikkollen) was a K80 ski jumping hill in Mjøndalen, Norway opened in 1914. It was owned by Mjøndalen IF.

== History ==
On 28 March 1914 hill was officially opened, but hill was completed already two years earlier and was converted and enlarged in 1933.

On 7 February 1915, Norwegian Reidar Amble Ommundsen set the only official world record at 54 metres (177 ft).

Vikkollen was scheduled to be the site of the national championships 1941, but the event was cancelled because of the sport strike during the World War II.

The hill where it was constructed was at the farm of Bothnia, just south of Mjøndalen center. It was the venue for the National Ski Jump Championships in 1946 and Nordic Combined Championships in 1960.

The jump was reconstructed again in 1950, the year after Erling Hook extended the world record to 86 meters. After yet another modification, the national ski jumping championships in 1960 were held in Vikkollen.

Ole Tom Nord was the Norwegian champion. In March 1960, the last jump record of 86.5 meters was set by the Finnish Paavo Lukkariniemi in a Nordic race. The last race in Vikkollen was held in 1963, and three years later, the scaffolding collapsed.

== Ski jumping world record ==
No.	Date	Name	Country	Metres	Feet
#22	7 February 1915	Reidar Amble Ommundsen	Norway	54	177
