= Ragnar Larsen =

Norwegian footballer and manager (1925-1982)

Personal information
- Full name: Ragnar Nikolay Larsen
- Date of birth: 7 January 1925
- Place of birth: Oslo, Norway
- Date of death: 14 January 1982 (aged 57)
- Height: 1.71 m (5 ft 7 in)
- Position: Midfielder

Senior career*
Years	Team	Apps	(Gls)
1948–1951	Sandaker		
1951–1953	Lazio	57	(14)
1953–1956	Genoa	92	(5)
1956–1958	Lugano		
1958–1962	Sandaker		

International career
1948–1962	Norway	11	(2)

Managerial career
- 1957–1958: Lugano
- 1958: Norway
- 1962: Lillestrøm SK
- 1962–1966: Norway
- 1967: Strømsgodset
- * Club domestic league appearances and goals

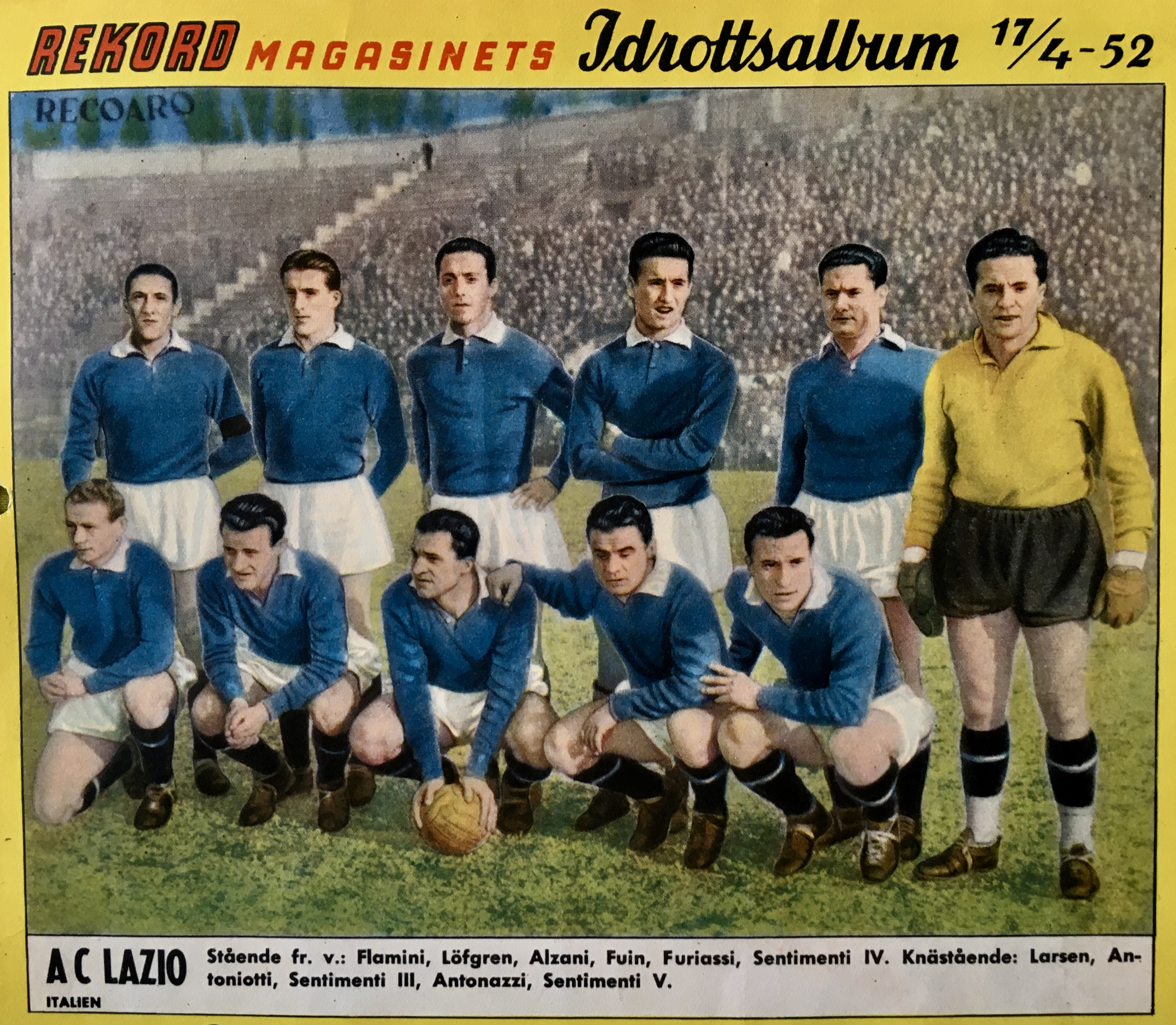
Società Sportiva Lazio 1951-52: Framini, Sigge Löfgren, Alzani, Fuin, Furiassi, Sentimenti IV; Ragnar Nikolay Larsen, Antoniotti, Sentimenti III, Antonazzi and Sentimenti V.

Ragnar Nikolay Larsen (7 January 1925 – 14 January 1982) was a Norwegian football midfielder. He later became a football manager and, after actively retiring from the sport, he took up a position as a sports journalist for Aftenposten, a Norwegian newspaper.

Larsen played as a midfielder and started his playing career with Sandaker. He then relocated to Italy in 1951, spending time at both Lazio and Genoa. He also spent time with Swiss side Lugano before returning to his first club and then retiring from the field in 1962.

Larsen was last capped in 1961, aged 37 years and 201 days, and is the fifth oldest player at the Norwegian national team.

As well as being capped for the Norway national football team, he was its manager for two different spells. He also coached Lillestrøm SK and Strømsgodset.
