= Sture Fladmark =

Norwegian footballer and manager (born 1967)

Personal information
- Date of birth: 30 June 1967 (age 59)
- Place of birth: Norway
- Position: Midfielder

Senior career*
Years	Team	Apps	(Gls)
–	Aalesunds		
1990–1998	Lyn	113	(5)

Managerial career
- 2002: Lyn
- –: IL Hødd
- –: South Africa (assistant)
- 2009–: Skarbøvik IF
- * Club domestic league appearances and goals

Sture Fladmark (born 30 June 1967) is a Norwegian football manager and a former player.

== Playing career ==
He played for Aalesunds and Lyn.

== Managing career ==
He led Lyn to bronze medals in the Norwegian Premier League in 2002. He also won the Kniksen award as coach of the year in 2002. He also was the assistant manager for South Africa national football team under Stuart Baxter. He also coached IL Hødd and is currently in Skarbøvik IF.

== Honours ==
- Kniksen Award as Coach of the year: 2002
