= Tønsberg FIK =

Norwegian sports club

- Full name: Tønsberg Friidrettsklubb
- Founded: 25 November 1981
- Ground: Greveskogen idrettspark Tønsberg

Tønsberg Friidrettsklubb is a Norwegian track and field club from Tønsberg, Vestfold.

== Organization ==
On 25 November 1981 it was established as a merger of the athletics departments of Tønsbergs TF with IF Tønsberg-Kameratene. This was the fifth attempt to conduct such a merger; the previous attempts had all stranded. The club hosted the Norwegian Championships in 1993. The home field is Greveskogen.

== National champions ==
The club has been successful in distance running. In the 3000 metres steeplechase Morten Rønnekleiv became national champion in 1989, 1990 and 1992, and world-class skier Anders Aukland won silver and bronze medals in 1993, 1994 and 2001. Aukland also became 5000 metres champion in 1995, and won silver in 1994. Rønnekleiv became national champion in cross-country running in 1988 and 1990 (3 km). Roy Andersen became national marathon champion in 1987 and half marathon champion in 1988. He won the 5000 metres silver medals in 1982 and 1983, won the 10,000 metres silver in 1982, and a bronze in 1985. In cross-country running Andersen became national champion in 1982, 1985 and 1986 with a silver in 1988 (10 km), and in this distance Aukland won a silver and bronze in 2003 and 2006.

The club is also known for their throwers. Then-national record holder Richard Olsen won the hammer throw in 1982 and 1983, and a bronze in 1984; Knut Vikne won the bronze in 2000. Arne Pedersen won the shot put gold and the discus throw bronze in 1985; Trond Ulleberg won the shot put silver in 1983. For women, Marianne Thorsen won a shot put bronze in 1988 and discus bronzes in 1985 and 1987. Birgit Brosø won the shot put silver and bronze in 1990 and 1993, and a heptathlon silver in 1993. Katharina Hopen has won the club's only javelin throw medal to date, a silver in 1990.

In sprints, Lisbeth Pettersen (née Andersen) is the most prominent. She became national 400 metres champion in 1987, 1988, 1989 and 1990, and won three other medals. She won a 200 metres bronze in 1987. Jon Nicolaisen won silver medals in the 400 metres hurdles in 1985 and 1990, and a bronze in 1988. In the jumps, Thomas Røkenes won a high jump silver medal in 1992. Marianne Vikne won silver medals in 1984, 1985 and 1995 and a bronze in 1993. Harald Vikne won the silver medals in the standing long jump and decathlon in 1990, the bronze medal in the long jump in 1989, Even Hytten won the decathlon in 1991.
