= 1948–49 Norwegian Main League =

5th season of top-tier football league in Norway

Hovedserien
- Season: 1948–49
- Champions: Fredrikstad; 3rd title
- Relegated: Pors; Brann; Freidig; Sandaker

The 1948–49 Hovedserien was the 5th completed season of top division football in Norway. Following are the results of the 1948–49 Norwegian Main League season. At the top of the Norwegian football league system, it was Norway's top-tier league for association football clubs.

== Overview ==
It was contested by 16 teams, and Fredrikstad FK won the championship.

== Teams and locations ==
Note: Table lists in alphabetical order.

Group A
Team	Ap.	Location
Ålgård	3	Ålgård
Brann	4	Bergen
Ørn	4	Horten
Pors	4	Porsgrunn
Skeid	3	Oslo
Sparta	2	Sarpsborg
Vålerengen	4	Oslo
Viking	4	Stavanger

Group B
Team	Ap.	Location
Fredrikstad	4	Fredrikstad
Freidig	2	Trondheim
Lyn	4	Oslo
Mjøndalen	4	Nedre Eiker
Sandaker	2	Oslo
Sandefjord BK	3	Sandefjord
Sarpsborg FK	4	Sarpsborg
Storm	4	Skien

== League tables ==
=== Group A ===
Pos	Team	Pld	W	D	L	GF	GA	GD	Pts	Qualification or relegation
1	Vålerengen	14	9	2	3	23	13	+10	20	Qualification for the championship final
2	Sparta	14	9	1	4	30	18	+12	19	
3	Viking	14	7	4	3	25	18	+7	18	
4	Ålgard	14	7	3	4	18	17	+1	17	
5	Skeid	14	7	0	7	34	25	+9	14	
6	Ørn	14	6	2	6	25	23	+2	14	
7	Pors (R)	14	1	4	9	11	34	−23	6	Relegation
8	Brann (R)	14	1	2	11	25	43	−18	4	Relegation

Source: RSSSF
(R) Relegated

=== Group B ===
Pos	Team	Pld	W	D	L	GF	GA	GD	Pts	Qualification or relegation
1	Fredrikstad (C)	14	10	2	2	29	10	+19	22	Qualification for the championship final
2	Sarpsborg	14	7	4	3	26	14	+12	18	
3	Lyn	14	5	6	3	19	17	+2	16	
4	Sandefjord	14	5	5	4	25	20	+5	15	
5	Mjøndalen	14	6	0	8	18	26	−8	12	
6	Storm	14	3	6	5	15	24	−9	12	
7	Freidig (R)	14	3	3	8	15	27	−12	9	Relegation
8	Sandaker (R)	14	3	2	9	22	31	−9	8	Relegation

Source: RSSSF
(C) Champions; (R) Relegated

== Results ==
=== Group A ===
Home \ Away	ÅLG	SKB	ØRN	POR	SKD	SPA	VIF	VIK
Ålgård		3–2	2–2	1–0	2–1	0–2	0–0	1–0
Brann	1–3		2–3	2–2	2–3	3–0	2–4	0–2
Ørn	2–0	4–2		4–1	2–0	2–1	0–1	0–1
Pors	1–1	1–1	2–0		0–1	0–3	0–2	1–3
Skeid	1–2	7–1	3–2	8–1		5–2	1–0	2–3
Sparta	1–0	3–1	4–1	5–1	3–1		2–1	3–1
Vålerengen	3–0	4–3	2–1	2–0	2–1	1–0		0–2
Viking	1–3	4–3	2–2	1–1	3–0	1–1	1–1	

Source: NIFS.no
Legend: Blue = home team win; Yellow = draw; Red = away team win.

=== Group B ===
Home \ Away	FFK	FRE	LYN	MJØ	SDK	SBK	SAR	STO
Fredrikstad		2–0	4–1	1–2	4–2	1–0	3–1	5–0
Freidig	1–3		0–0	0–2	2–1	0–2	0–2	1–1
Lyn	1–1	2–2		2–0	4–0	1–0	1–1	0–0
Mjøndalen	0–1	4–1	0–2		0–7	3–0	2–3	3–1
Sandaker	2–1	3–2	1–3	1–2		1–2	0–3	2–2
Sandefjord BK	0–0	4–5	3–1	3–0	4–1		1–1	2–2
Sarpsborg FK	0–1	1–0	5–1	2–0	1–1	1–1		4–1
Storms	0–2	0–1	0–0	2–0	1–0	3–3	2–1	

Source: NIFS.no
Legend: Blue = home team win; Yellow = draw; Red = away team win.

== Championship final ==
- Vålerengen 1–3 Fredrikstad
- Fredrikstad 3–0 Vålerengen
