= Arne Brustad =

Norwegian footballer (1912-1987)

Personal information
- Date of birth: 14 April 1912
- Place of birth: Oslo, Norway
- Date of death: 22 August 1987 (aged 75)
- Place of death: Oslo, Norway

Senior career*
Years	Team	Apps	(Gls)
1930–1948	Lyn		

International career
1935–1946	Norway	33	(17)
Medal record
Men's Football
Bronze medal – third place	1936 Berlin	Team
- * Club domestic league appearances and goals

Arne Brustad (14 April 1912 – 22 August 1987) was a Norwegian footballer. He is regarded as one of the country's best players of all time.

== Career ==
Brustad was an outside-left for Lyn. He won 33 caps for Norway, and scored 17 international goals. He was a member of Norway's "Bronze Team" from the 1936 Olympics.

Brustad, who made his international debut in 1935, was one of the star players of the Berlin Olympics, where he scored five goals in four matches, including all three goals in Norway's 3–2 win against Poland in the third-place match.

In 1938, Brustad was a member of Norway's World Cup team. Norway were knocked out in the first round by eventual champions Italy after extra time by a score of 2–1. Brustad scored the Norwegian goal shortly before the end of normal time, and also added a second a few minutes later, but this goal was controversially disallowed for offside. Later the same year, Brustad was named in the "Rest of Europe XI" that played England at Highbury.

At club level, Brustad played for Lyn from 1930 to 1948, winning the Norwegian Cup in 1945 and 1946.

== Honours ==
Norway

- Summer Olympics bronze medal: 1936

Lyn

- Norwegian Cup: 1945, 1946
