= John Sveinsson =

Norwegian footballer (1922–2009)

John Lunde Sveinsson (29 January 1922 – 2009) was a Norwegian football player and manager who played as a forward.

During the occupation of Norway by Nazi Germany he fled Norway in 1941. Via neutral Sweden he reached Scotland in 1943 and underwent military training. He also played football for Dundee United during that time. In 1945 he returned as a paratrooper to Norway for the Norwegian Independent Company 1.

Sveinsson mainly played football for SFK Lyn, winning the 1945 Norwegian Football Cup and becoming top goalscorer in the 1950–51 Norwegian Main League with 19 goals. He is also known as Lyn's most prolific goalscorer in one match, with six goals, and also coached Lyn in the 1960s. He was capped three times for Norway, scoring once.

== Honours ==
Individual

- Norwegian top division top scorer: 1950–51
