= Knut Andersen (footballer, born 1930) =

Norwegian footballer (1930-2002)

Personal information
- Full name: Knut Johnny Andersen
- Date of birth: 8 October 1930
- Place of birth: Sarpsborg, Norway
- Date of death: 28 May 2002 (aged 71)
- Position: Forward

International career
Years	Team	Apps	(Gls)
1952	Norway	1	(0)

Knut Andersen (8 October 1930 – 28 May 2002) was a Norwegian footballer. He played in one match for the Norway national football team in 1952.
