= Sandaker SFK =

Norwegian football club

- Full name: Sandaker Ski og Fotballklubb
- Founded: July 6, 1915; 111 years ago
- Ground: Nordre Åsen Stadion
- Coach: Adam Khan
- League: 10. divisjon
- 2022: 8th of 10 in 10. divisjon
Home colours	Away colours

Sandaker Ski og Fotballklubb (Sandaker Ski and Football Club), founded on 6 July 1915, is a football club in Sandaker in Oslo, Norway. The football club is part of a sports club which now only includes football and skiing, but they formerly also had a futsal section. Sandaker SFK had been in the top Norwegian division from 1947 until 1949, as well as the second division 1949–1952 and 1957–1961, and continued to operate in the league system of Norway until withdrawing from the 6. divisjon (the seventh tier of Norway) in 2013. In 2022, Sandaker SFK re-entered the league system and now play in the 10. divisjon (the eleventh tier of Norway). They play in the Nordre Åsen Stadion, which is shared with Skeid. In 1961 the club merged with neighbouring Åsen Sportsklubb, competing as Sandaker/Åsen until 1973.

== History ==
Sandaker SFK have traditionally played in the lower divisions of Norwegian football, however they spent two consecutive seasons (1947/48 and 1948/49) in the Norwegian Top Division. In the Norwegian Cup, Sandaker reached the quarter-final in 1951 which is the furthest that they have ever reached. The club's best known player, and only player to play international football for Norway, Ragnar Larsen, played at Sandaker from 1948 to 1951 before moving to Italy, then returning to Sandaker in 1958 until 1962 after playing for Lazio, Genoa, and Swiss club Lugano. While playing professionally abroad, Larsen served a one-year suspension from the national team for breaching Norwegian amateur rules, which barred professional players from international selection.

=== Merging with Åsen SK ===
In 1961, Sandaker SFK merged with a nearby club, Åsen Sportsklubb, which had been founded in 1932. Åsen SK had originally belonged to the [[Workers Federation of Sports|Arbeidernes Idrettsforbund]] (AIF), the workers' sports federation, and was a pioneer of age-specific sports, organising junior football tournaments from the 1930s under Harry Næss. The tournaments later expanded to handball and ice hockey. The combined club competed as Sandaker/Åsen until 1973, when members voted to keep only the Sandaker name; in protest, the short-lived club Åsenkameratene was formed.

== Kit ==
Sandaker wear white kits with a blue and red stripe, blue shorts, and red socks.

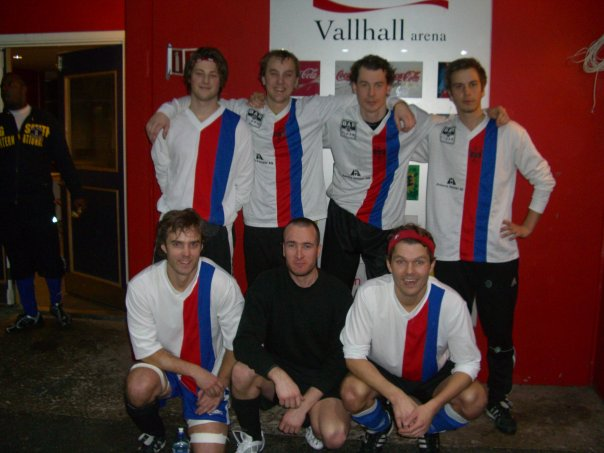
Sandaker Kit 2008

== Notable members ==
- Ragnar Larsen: Norwegian international footballer, 11 caps for the Norway national football team
- Alf Andersen: Norwegian ski jumper, 1928 Winter Olympic gold medalist

== See also ==
- Norwegian football league system
- List of football clubs in Norway
