= Knut Osnes =

Norwegian footballer and coach (1922-2015)

Personal information
- Date of birth: 27 June 1922
- Place of birth: Nordfjordeid, Norway
- Date of death: 10 August 2015 (aged 93)
- Place of death: Oslo, Norway
- Position: Forward

Senior career*
Years	Team	Apps	(Gls)
1938–1940	Eid		
1945–1950	Lyn		
1951–?	Eid		

International career
1946–1947	Norway	6	(5)

Managerial career
- 1962: Vålerengen
- 1967–1969: Lyn
- 1970–1971: Aalesund
- 1972: Strømsgodset
- * Club domestic league appearances and goals

Knut "Bossen" Osnes (27 June 1922 – 10 August 2015) was a Norwegian footballer and coach, who most notably played for Lyn and Norway, and coaching Lyn to the 1968 league title and a good run in the Cup Winners Cup the same year.

Osnes was born in Nordfjordeid and made his senior debut for his local team Eid Idrettslag as a 16-year-old in 1938. After the end of the war, Osnes moved to Oslo to study teaching, and also joined Lyn after a successful trial. He became part of the Lyn team that won the Norwegian Championship (cup) in 1945 and 1946, and later went on to score five goals in six matches for Norway, also becoming the first-ever player from Sogn og Fjordane county to represent the national team. Poor eyesight forced him to retire from top-level football in 1950, and he returned home to Nordfjordeid where he worked several years as a gym teacher while playing for his local club.

Osnes moved back to Oslo in the early 1960s where he got a teaching job, and was also employed as a youth team coach for his old club Lyn, before coaching Vålerengen's senior team in 1962. In 1967, Osnes was appointed head coach at Lyn, and guided the club to a cup title in his first season. The following season, Lyn won the league and cup double, and also went on an excellent run in the Cup Winners Cup, where they reached the quarter-finals before being narrowly defeated by Barcelona.

Having lost star player Harald Berg, Lyn struggled in 1969, and Osnes stepped down at the end of the season. He later coached Aalesund and Strømsgodset. Osnes died in August 2015, aged 93.
