= Gunnar Andreassen =

Norwegian footballer (1913-2002)

Personal information
- Full name: Gunnar Andreassen
- Date of birth: 5 January 1913
- Place of birth: Norway
- Date of death: 23 July 2002 (aged 89)
- Position: Midfielder

Senior career*
Years	Team	Apps	(Gls)
1933–1950	Fredrikstad		

International career
1939–1945	Norway	2	(0)

Managerial career
- 1953–1956: Fredrikstad
- 1959–1962: Østsiden
- * Club domestic league appearances and goals

Gunnar Andreassen (5 January 1913 – 23 July 2002) was a Norwegian football player and manager. He played on Fredrikstad FK from 1933 to 1950, except during the World War II German occupation of Norway. He appeared twice on the Norway national team, in 1939 (the last international competition before occupation) and 1945 (the first competition following the end of occupation). Andreassen managed Fredrikstad from 1953 to 1956 and Østsiden IL from 1959 to 1962.
