= Tønsbergs TF =

Norwegian sports club

Logo.

Tønsbergs Turnforening, often called Tønsberg Turn is a Norwegian sports club from Tønsberg, Vestfold. It has sections for team handball, speed skating, figure skating, gymnastics and pétanque.

== General history ==
The club was founded on 9 June 1864. In November 1981 it lost its track and field section, as it merged with IF Tønsberg-Kameratene to form Tønsberg FIK. In 1985 the association football section merged with Tønsberg-Kameratene to form Tønsberg FK.

== Speed skating ==
Speed skater Fred Anton Maier represented the club, so did Roar Grønvold, Else Marie Fjære, Bjørn Tveter and Terje Andersen.

== Athletics ==
The club has had many Norwegian champions. Anne Lise Sandberg became national 400 metres champion in 1961, and won silver medals in 1959 and 1960. She won a 100 metres bronze and a 200 metres silver in 1958. In other sprints, Sigurd Marcussen took a silver medal in the 400 metres in 1932 and Terje Larsen a bronze medal in 1966. Marcussen also won silver medals in the 400 metres hurdles in 1932 and 1933, and a decathlon bronze in 1931. Trygve Rye Johnsen won the 10,000 metres bronze in 1930, and Roy Andersen won the silver medal in 1981.

Hroar Kranstad became national champion in the standing high jump in 1971; Thor Moen won a bronze medal in 1953. In 1940 Leif Rosenblad won bronze medals in both standing high and standing long jump. In the pole vault, former Tønsberg-Kameratene athlete Andreas Larsen took a bronze medal in 1957. Ebba Lund Hansen was a prominent jumper in the 1950s, with high jump silvers in 1959 and 1960 and a bronze in 1963. She also won the standing high jump in 1959 and 1960 as well as three lesser medals. In 1956 she won the standing long jump bronze. Ann Chr. Breirem won the standing high jump in 1972. Grete Gulliksen won the long jump bronze in 1958. The club itself hosted the Norwegian Championships in Standing Jumps in 1974.

For the history after 1981, see Tønsberg FIK.
