= IF Tønsberg-Kameratene =

Norwegian sports club

Logo.

Idrettsforeningen Tønsberg-Kameratene is a Norwegian sports club from Tønsberg, Vestfold. It has sections for boxing, sport wrestling and weightlifting.

== General history ==
The club was founded on 10 October 1917. In November 1981 it lost its track and field section, as it merged with Tønsbergs TF to form Tønsberg FIK. In 1985 the association football section merged with Tønsbergs TF to form Tønsberg FK.

== Current sports ==
Weightlifter Ruth Kasirye represents the club.

== Athletics ==
The club has had many athletes who competed on national level. Rune Nilsen became long jump champion in 1949 and won the bronze in 1946. He also became triple jump champion in 1946, 1947 and 1949 and won the silver in 1948. In the pole vault, Andreas Larsen took silver medals in 1950 and 1951. Per Steen Andersen took a bronze medal in the standing long jump in 1962. The club itself hosted the Norwegian Championships in Standing Jumps in 1958.

Kåre Johansen became national 1500 metres champion in 1951, and Thor Smith became national 800 metres champion in 1976. Åse Svinsholt Smith won 800 metres silvers in 1973 and 1975 and a bronze in 1981, as well as a 1500 metres bronze in 1975.

For the history after 1981, see Tønsberg FIK.
