= Nydalens SK =

Norwegian sports club

Nydalens Skiklub is a Norwegian sports club from Nydalen, Oslo. It was founded in 1886 (139 years ago), and has sections for orienteering, Nordic skiing and ski orienteering. The club organized national ski jumping competitions regularly from 1891 to 1953, and had its own ski jumping venue at Korsvoll. In orienteering, the club won national championships in relay in 1954 (men), 1968 (women), 1996, 1997 and 1999 (men), and 2000 and 2005 (women). The club organized the national orienteering championships in relay in 1953, the individual Norwegian championships in orienteering in 1961. and the national championships in 1999. Among the successful orienteers from the club are Bjørnar Valstad, Astrid Hansen, Elisabeth Ingvaldsen, Marianne Andersen and Carl Henrik Bjørseth. The club won the women's relay competition in Tiomila in 2006.

The club has around 500 members. They hosted the 2012 Norwegian championships in orienteering in Maridalen.
