= Arne Ileby =

Norwegian footballer (1913-1999)

Personal information
- Full name: Arne Ludvig Grundt Ileby
- Date of birth: 2 December 1913
- Place of birth: Fredrikstad, Norway
- Date of death: 25 December 1999 (aged 86)
- Position: Forward

Youth career
- Fredrikstad

Senior career*
Years	Team	Apps	(Gls)
1933-c.1946	Fredrikstad		

International career
1939	Norway	1	(0)
- * Club domestic league appearances and goals

Arne Ludvig Grundt Ileby (2 December 1913 – 25 December 1999) was a Norwegian footballer. He played his entire senior career as a forward for Fredrikstad FK, with which he won four Norwegian Football Cup titles (1935, 1936, 1938, and 1940) and two Norwegian Premier League titles (1937–38 and 1938–39).

Ileby was in the Norwegian squads for the 1936 Olympics and the 1938 World Cup, but was not capped in either tournament. His only appearance for the national team was in a match against Sweden in 1939.
