= Knut Brynildsen =

Norwegian footballer (1917–1986)

Personal information
- Full name: Knut Brynildsen
- Date of birth: 23 July 1917
- Place of birth: Norway
- Date of death: 15 January 1986 (aged 68)
- Position: Forward

International career
Years	Team	Apps	(Gls)
1935–1948	Norway	18	(10)

Knut Brynildsen (23 July 1917 – 15 January 1986) was a Norwegian footballer. Playing for the Norway national team between 1935–1940 and 1945–1948, he managed to score 10 goals in 18 caps. He participated at the 1938 FIFA World Cup.

On club level Brynildsen played for Fredrikstad, where he helped win the Norwegian cup in 1935, 1936, 1938 and 1940, and the league title in 1938, 1939 og 1949.
