= Bjørn Spydevold =

Norwegian footballer (1918-2002)

Personal information
- Date of birth: 8 September 1918
- Place of birth: Sarpsborg, Norway
- Date of death: 30 March 2002 (aged 83)
- Place of death: Greåker

Senior career*
Years	Team	Apps	(Gls)
- Fredrikstad FK

International career
1945–1953	Norway	37	(1)
- * Club domestic league appearances and goals

Bjørn Spydevold (8 September 1918 – 30 March 2002) was a Norwegian football player. He was born in Sarpsborg, and played for the sports club Fredrikstad FK. He played for the Norwegian national team at the 1952 Summer Olympics in Helsinki. He was capped 37 times for Norway between 1946 and 1953, scoring one goal.

He was the father of Thor Spydevold, Knut Spydevold and Bjørnar Spydevold.
