= Lyn Fotball =

Association football club in Oslo, Norway

Lyn 1896 FK
- Full name: Lyn 1896 Fotballklubb
- Founded: 3 March 1896; 130 years ago
- Ground: Bislett Stadium, Oslo, Norway
- Capacity: 15,400
- Head coach: Magnus Aadland
- League: OBOS-ligaen
- 2026: 1. divisjon, 11th of 16
- Website: lyn1896.no
Home colours	Away colours

Lyn 1896 Fotballklubb (Norwegian pronunciation: [lyːn]) is a Norwegian football club and a department of the sports club Ski- og Fotballklubben Lyn based in Oslo, whose members also participate in Nordic skiing and orienteering. Until 2010, SFK Lyn had two football departments, one professional section and one amateur section. After the professional football department, FK Lyn, was bankrupted in 2010, the fans decided to support the amateur department, Lyn Fotball, instead. With the help of some of the old FK Lyn players, Lyn Fotball won three consecutive promotions, and are now playing in the Norwegian first division. The team plays its home matches at Bislett Stadium, and the head coach is currently Magnus Aadland.

Lyn was founded in 1896 and is one of the oldest football clubs in Norway. They were founding members of the Football Association of Norway in 1902. The club won the top division title in 1964 and 1968 and have won the cup eight times. Lyn was also the initiator of the construction of Ullevaal Stadion, which has served as Norway's national stadium since 1927 and was Lyn's home ground from 1926 to 2010. Lyn has traditionally been perceived as representing the upper and middle classes, whereas the eastside club Vålerenga was seen as belonging to the workers.

The club enjoyed some success during the first half of the 20th century, securing many cup titles, and despite failing to win the league title, had a certain stature in Norwegian football. The Norway national football team that won the bronze medal at the 1936 Summer Olympics included six players from Lyn. The captain of this team was Lyn-player Jørgen Juve, who was the player with the most goals scored for the Norway national team until Erling Braut Haaland surpassed him. The club's most recent period of success was during the 1960s, when they won four trophies and reached the quarter-finals of the European Cup Winners' Cup.

Lyn also fields a women's team, which in 2012 won promotion to the 1. divisjon, the second tier in women's football. In 2017 the women's team, managed by Glenn Kleven, won promotion to the Toppserien, the top tier of women's football in Norway.

== History ==
=== Early success ===
Lyn was founded on 3 March 1896 at St. Hanshaugen. Lyn was one of three clubs who in 1902 founded the Football Association of Norway, and is the only one still existing. In the first decade of Football in Norway, the club was one of the strongest and won four consecutive Norwegian Cups from 1908 until 1911. At the 1936 Summer Olympics, six Lyn-players, Arne Brustad, Øivind Holmsen, Fredrik Horn, Magnar Isaksen, Jørgen Juve and Frithjof Ulleberg, represented the Norway national football team that won the bronze medal, with Juve as the team's captain.

Lyn also won the cup in 1945 and 1946 but had to wait until 1964 for their first league-title. With Harald Berg and Ola Dybwad-Olsen as main contributors the club secured another victory in the cup in 1967, and in 1968 the club won The Double, clinching both the League title and the Cup, and became the first team from Norway to reach the quarter-final of the European Cup Winners' Cup, where they met Barcelona. Because of the weather conditions during the winter in Norway, both matches were played in Spain. Lyn lost the first game 2-3 and in the second match Lyn was leading 2–0 with 15 minutes left to play. The match ended 2-2 and thus Lyn was eliminated.

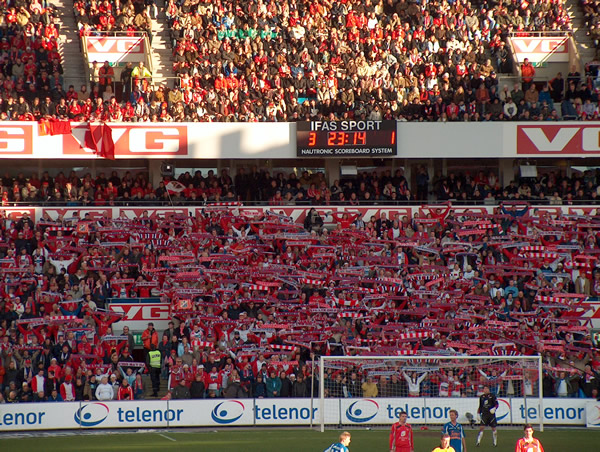
The 'Bastionen' fans at the 2004 final

The Double was followed by a dismal period in the club's history. The club was relegated in 1969, and even though the team was promoted back after one year and reached the cup final in 1970, the club was again relegated in 1973. During the next 30 years, Lyn was swiftly relegated and promoted between the first and the third tier and the club was never playing in the top division for more than three consecutive seasons. During this period the fan base eroded and Lyn is said to have lost a generation of supporters.

During the 90s the club went back and forth between the Premier League and the First Division. In 1994, Lyn reached the Norwegian Cup final but lost 2–3 to Molde.

=== The Brynestad period ===
Norwegian investor Atle Brynestad bought the club in 1999, in effect saving it from bankruptcy. In 2000, the team was promoted to the top league, after winning the First Division with an unprecedented number of points, and they retained their spot in the top flight the following year. In the 2002 season, a strengthened Lyn took the lead early on and led the league by 7 points after 14 matches (just past the halfway mark), but completely collapsed in the second half of the season and ended on 3rd (9 points behind the winner) after a disastrous slump in form and the controversial appointment of new head coach, Hrvoje Braović. The misery, in part due to the constant hiring and firing of coaches, continued into the next year. Lyn struggled at the bottom of the table for most of the season but avoided relegation thanks to the efforts of team captain Tommy Berntsen, who took on the role as coach after Teitur Thordarson, the 5th coach in two years, had resigned. 2004 was a recovery year for Lyn, ending the season in 6th place and reaching the Norwegian Cup final (lost to Brann).

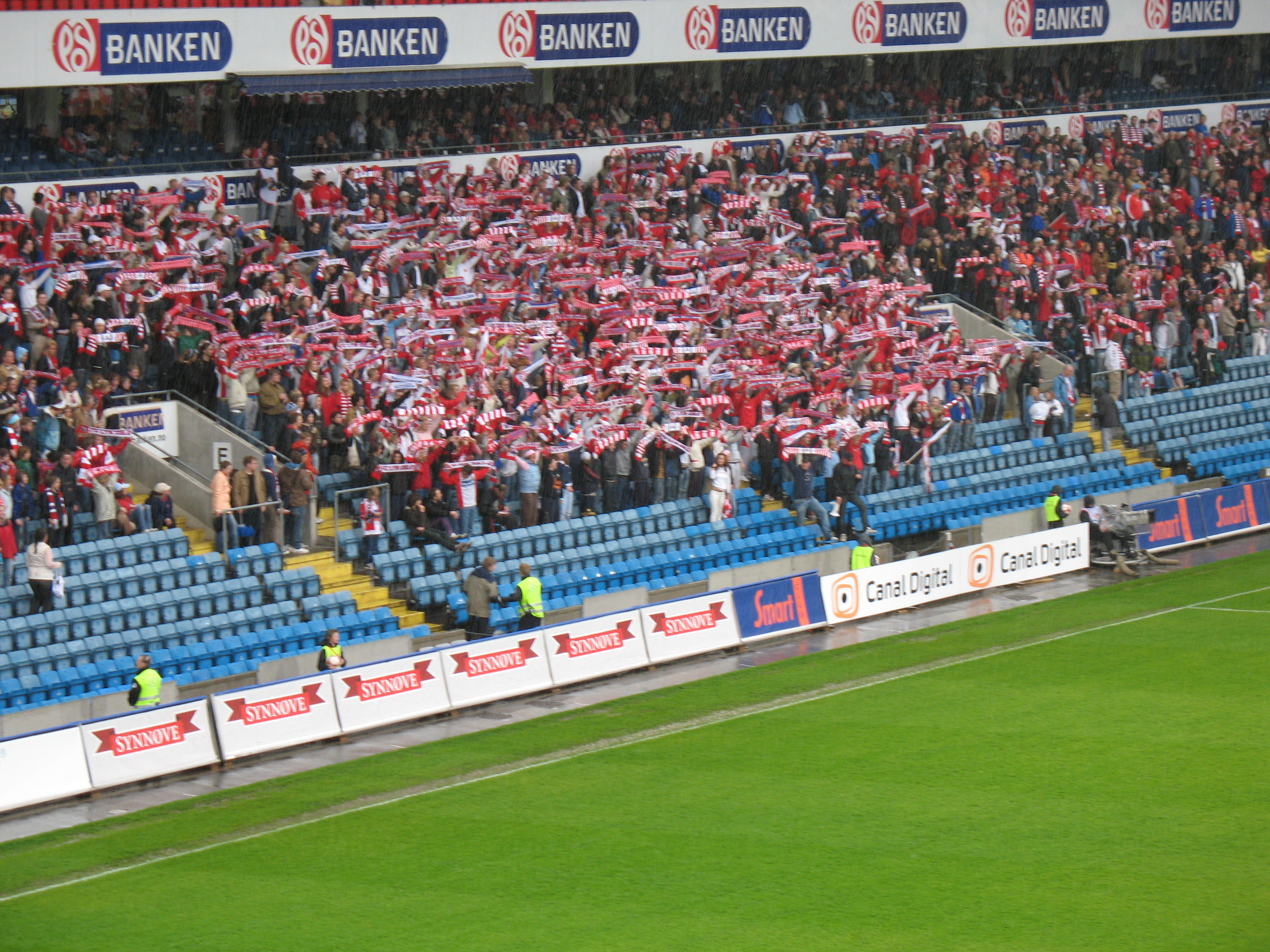
"Bastionen", the fans of Lyn Oslo

2005 was an eventful year for the club, both on and off the pitch. The club's youth program was beginning to bear fruits and with former international Henning Berg as the new head coach the club claimed 3rd spot in the league. Lyn defeated Rosenborg at Ullevaal for the first time since 1968 and repeated the feat in the away game.

In April, the club's talented Nigerian midfielder Mikel John Obi signed a contract with Manchester United, and according to a statement by Lyn's managing director Morgan Andersen, it was the most expensive transfer in Norwegian football to date. The transfer has since been the source of a heated dispute, and Mikel instead joined Chelsea after a long period of time. FIFA released an announcement stating that Lyn had done everything correct in the process. The transfer is said to have cost Chelsea £16 million. £12 million of this to Manchester United and £4 million to Lyn.

=== Bankruptcy ===
On 10 October 2008, Chelsea announced on their website that they were initiating legal proceedings against Lyn Oslo and their former director Morgan Andersen in an attempt to recover the entire £16 million fee paid. Chelsea maintain that this was due to the contract of the original transfer being based on a fraudulent misrepresentation.

In 2007, the club sold Nigerian international Chinedu Obasi to TSG Hoffenheim for an expected €5 million.

The 2009 season was again very disappointing with the club relegated from Tippeligaen and saved from liquidation at the last moment.

The 2010 season saw Lyn at Bislett Stadium (sharing with Skeid) in the second level of Norway football. In April 2010 Idar Vollvik's company, Ludo, was presented as the club's latest sponsor in an attempt to rescue the club from its financial crisis, but to no avail, and on 30 June 2010, the club declared bankruptcy.

=== Recent years ===
Following the bankruptcy, Lyn's fans gathered around the club's surviving team in the 6. divisjon (seventh tier) for the remainder of the 2010 season moving their home games to Frogner Stadion, drawing large crowds to their home games. In late 2010, Lyn club paid all debt associated with the reserves team of the bankrupt top-flight club. The football association then awarded Lyn the licence formerly held by the reserves, allowing the club to play the 2011 season in the 4. divisjon. Led by Finn Bredo Olsen, Lyn secured promotion to the 3. divisjon, after a perfect season with no losses or draws. On 30 September 2012, Lyn secured promotion to the 2. divisjon, after beating Lommedalen 9–0 in front of 2,113 spectators at Frogner Stadion. But, in 2015, Lyn was relegated to the 3. divisjon after three seasons and the unsuccessful attempts to promote to the 1. divisjon. After 6 seasons in the 3. divisjon, Lyn got promoted to the 2. divisjon in 2022. The next season they got promoted to the 1. divisjon for the first time since 2010 under coach Jan Halvor Halvorsen.

== Achievements ==
- Norwegian top flight:
  - Winners (2): 1964, 1968
  - Runners-up (4): 1937–38, 1963, 1965, 1971
- Norwegian Cup:
  - Winners (8): 1908, 1909, 1910, 1911, 1945, 1946, 1967, 1968
  - Runners-up (6): 1923, 1928, 1966, 1970, 1994, 2004
- Oslo Championships:
  - Winners (8): 1915, 1917, 1922, 1926, 1930, 1935, 1936, 1937
  - Runners-up (2): 1909, 1919

== Recent history ==
Season		Pos.	Pl.	W	D	L	GS	GA	P	Cup	Notes
2003	Tippeligaen	10	26	8	6	12	34	45	30	Fourth round	
2004	Tippeligaen	6	26	9	10	7	30	31	37	Final	
2005	Tippeligaen	3	26	12	8	6	37	21	44	Third round	
2006	Tippeligaen	7	26	10	5	11	33	36	35	Fourth round	
2007	Tippeligaen	9	26	10	4	12	43	46	34	Quarterfinal	
2008	Tippeligaen	7	26	11	5	10	38	34	38	Quarterfinal	
2009	Tippeligaen	↓ 16	30	2	10	18	29	59	16	Quarterfinal	Relegated to the 1. divisjon
2010	1. divisjon	↓ 16	0	0	0	0	0	0	0	Third round	Bankrupt mid-season, all 11 previous results that season nullified
2010	6. divisjon	↑ 1	18	14	1	3	87	28	43	Ineligible	The grassroots football organisation "Lyn Fotball" that played a full season. Promoted to the 4. divisjon
2011	4. divisjon	↑ 1	20	20	0	0	106	10	60	DNQ	Promoted to the 3. divisjon
2012	3. divisjon	↑ 1	24	21	1	2	100	13	64	First round	Promoted to the 2. divisjon
2013	2. divisjon	4	26	11	8	7	47	32	41	Second round	
2014	2. divisjon	10	26	9	5	12	42	42	32	Third round	
2015	2. divisjon	↓ 12	26	7	4	15	41	64	25	First round	Relegated to the 3. divisjon
2016	3. divisjon	1	26	20	5	1	69	20	65	First round	
2017	3. divisjon	2	26	20	3	3	71	35	63	First round	
2018	3. divisjon	3	26	17	2	7	73	40	53	First round	
2019	3. divisjon	6	26	11	6	9	57	45	39	First round	
2020	Season cancelled										
2021	3. divisjon	4	13	6	5	2	32	20	23	First round	
2022	3. divisjon	↑ 1	26	22	4	0	88	24	70	First round	Promoted to the 2. divisjon
2023	2. divisjon	↑ 2	26	20	2	4	74	23	62	Second round	Promoted to the 1. divisjon
2024	1. divisjon	5	30	12	10	8	56	40	46	Second round	
2025	1. divisjon	7	30	14	5	11	48	37	47	Third round	
2026	1. divisjon	11	30	10	4	16	46	61	34	Third round	

== Players ==
=== Current squad ===
As of 3 September 2026

Note: Flags indicate national team as defined under FIFA eligibility rules; some limited exceptions apply. Players may hold more than one non-FIFA nationality.

No.	Pos.	Nation	Player
1	GK	NOR	Alexander Pedersen
3	DF	NOR	Edvard Linnebo Race
4	DF	NOR	William Sell (captain)
5	DF	NOR	Isak Vik
6	DF	NOR	Ådne Midtskogen
7	MF	TOG	Isaac Monglo
9	FW	NOR	Anders Bjørntvedt Olsen
10	FW	NOR	Mathias Johansen
11	FW	NOR	Andreas Hellum
17	MF	NOR	Johan Solstad-Nøis (on loan from Tromsø)
18	DF	NOR	Herman Solberg Nilsen
19	MF	NOR	Ole Kallevåg

No.	Pos.	Nation	Player
20	MF	NOR	William Toft Wæhler
21	MF	NOR	Julius Skaug
22	MF	NOR	William Kurtovic
24	MF	NOR	Didrik Fredriksen
25	GK	NOR	Marcus Andersen
26	FW	MKD	Artan Metedov
27	DF	NOR	Isaac Barnett
29	DF	SEN	Seydina Ousmane Gueye
30	FW	SEN	Fallou Sock
55	DF	NOR	Sander Amble Haugen
66	MF	NOR	Mathias Johnsrud Emilsen
92	GK	NOR	Mats Trige

For season transfers, see List of Norwegian football transfers winter 2024–25, and List of Norwegian football transfers summer 2025.

=== Out on loan ===
Note: Flags indicate national team as defined under FIFA eligibility rules; some limited exceptions apply. Players may hold more than one non-FIFA nationality.

No.	Pos.	Nation	Player
14	MF	NOR	Eron Isufi (at Kristiansund BK)
77	FW	NOR	Brage Williamsen Hylen (at Lørenskog IF)

== European record ==
=== Summary ===
Competition	Pld	W	D	L	GF	GA	Last season played
European Cup	10	2	0	8	14	41	1969–70
UEFA Cup	8	3	2	3	14	17	2006–07
UEFA Cup Winners' Cup	8	2	1	5	13	19	1971–72
Inter-Cities Fairs Cup	2	0	1	1	0	2	1967–68
Total	28	7	4	17	41	79	

Pld = Matches played; W = Matches won; D = Matches drawn; L = Matches lost; GF = Goals for; GA = Goals against. Defunct competitions indicated in italics.
Notes: This summary includes matches played in the Inter-Cities Fairs Cup, which was not endorsed by UEFA and is not counted in UEFA's official European statistics.

=== List of matches ===
Season	Competition	Round	Opponent	Home	Away	Agg.
1963–64	European Cup	PR	(Germany) Borussia Dortmund	2–4	1–3	3–7
1964–65	European Cup	PR	(Finland) Reipas Lahti	3–0	1–2	4–2
1964–65	European Cup	R1	(Netherlands) DWS	1–3	0–5	1–8
1965–66	European Cup	PR	(Northern Ireland) Derry City	5–3	1–5	6–8
1967–68	Inter-Cities Fairs Cup	R1	(Italy) Bologna	0–0	0–2	0–2
1968–69	Cup Winners' Cup	R1	(Turkey) Altay	4–1	1–3	5–4
1968–69	Cup Winners' Cup	R2	(Sweden) Norrköping	2–0	2–3	4–3
1968–69	Cup Winners' Cup	QF	(Spain) Barcelona	2–2	2–3	4–5
1969–70	European Cup	R1	(England) Leeds United	0–6	0–10	0–16
1971–72	Cup Winners' Cup	R1	(Portugal) Sporting CP	0–3	0–4	0–7
1972–73	UEFA Cup	R1	(England) Tottenham Hotspur	3–6	0–6	3–12
2003–04	UEFA Cup	QR	(Faroe Islands) NSÍ Runavík	6–0	3–1	9–1
2003–04	UEFA Cup	R1	(Greece) PAOK	0–3	1–0	1–3
2006–07	UEFA Cup	QR1	(Estonia) Flora Tallinn	1–1	0–0	1–1 (a)

== Records ==
- Greatest home victory: 11-2 vs. Viking FK, 28 July 1968
- Greatest away victory: 14-1 vs. Nesøya, 29 September 2010
- Heaviest home loss: 1-8 vs. Strømsgodset Toppfotball, 16 May 1969
- Heaviest away loss: 1-10 vs. Strømsgodset Toppfotball, 16 June 1968
- Heaviest European loss: 0-10 vs. Leeds United, European Cup Rd.1, leg 1, Sept 1969
- Highest attendance, Ullevaal Stadion: 35,000 vs. Sarpsborg FK, 29 September 1946
- Highest average attendance, season: 8,089, 1968
- Most appearances, total: 420, Ola Dybwad-Olsen 1964-1978
- Most appearances, league: 219, Ola Dybwad-Olsen 1964-1978
- Most goals scored, league: 119, Ola Dybwad-Olsen 1964-1978
- Most goals scored, season: 25, Ola Dybwad-Olsen 1968
- Most goals scored in a game, league: 8, Knut Osnes vs. S.K. Falken
- Most goals scored in a game, UEFA Cup: 6, Eldar Hadžimehmedović vs. Runavík, 28 August 2003

== Colours and badge ==
Lyn's home colours are red and white shirts and blue shorts. The shirts have red sleeves and a red front with a broad, vertical white bar in the middle, which is traditionally twice as wide as the sides (a 25-50-25 red-white-red pattern). The back has the same pattern, with inverted colours.

During the first years the club had two kits, one with blue and white horizontally striped jerseys and white shorts, and a red kit in the same fashion. These were used interchangeably up until at least 1906. It is unclear exactly when the current kit was adopted, but it was in use by the time Lyn had claimed their first Norwegian Cup in 1908. The socks have traditionally been red. White socks have also been used, most recently from the beginning of the 1990s until 2004, when the red socks were brought back.

The club uses an all-blue away kit, though several different colours have been used in the past.

The current club badge is a modified version of a design originally introduced in 1900. It was made by one of the first members of the club, Leif Eriksen, and replaced a silver badge from 1898. The crest features a football in the upper left corner and a pair of skis in the lower right corner, representing the two major sports of the club. While the badge is based on the heraldic shield form of the old coat of arms of Norway, Eriksen was probably not himself familiar with the rules of heraldic design. The name of the club and the date and year of its founding were written in gold on a white background, violating the so-called rule of tincture. Also, the date and year were written in different styles. The badge has therefore been altered twice, in 1996 and finally in 2001. On the current badge the date has been removed and replaced by "18 LYN 96" in red writing on a white background.

== Stadium ==
After the 2009 season FC Lyn made the decision to move from Ullevaal Stadion to Bislett Stadium. Bislett, which is also an international track and field stadium, has a capacity of 15,400. Following the bankruptcy in 2010, Lyn's fans gathered around the club's surviving team moving their home games to Frogner Stadion, which has a capacity of 4,000. In 2014 Lyn moved back to Bislett Stadium.

== Coaches ==
- John Sveinsson (1963–64)
- Thor Hernes (1965)
- John Sveinsson (1966)
- Knut Osnes (1967–69)
- Per Mosgaard (1970–71)
- Andreas Morisbak (1972–74)
- Erik Eriksen (1975–76)
- Jan Berg (1977–78)
- Anders Fægri (1979–90)
- Øyvind Ramnefjell (1981–82)
- Anders Fægri (1983)
- Geirr Anfinnsen and Jan Rodvang (1984)
- Jan Rodvang (1984)
- Egil Olsen (1985–88)
- Georg Hammer (1989)
- Dag Roar Austmo, Jo Lunder and Stein Gran (1989)
- Erling Hokstad (1990)
- Teitur Thordarson (1991–92)
- Bjarne Rønning (1993)
- Ole Dyrstad (1993)
- Olle Nordin (1994–95)
- Hallstein Saunes (1995–98)
- Vidar Davidsen (1998–01)
- Stuart Baxter (2001)
- Sture Fladmark (2002)
- Hrvoje Braović (2002)
- Sture Fladmark (2002)
- Teitur Thordarson (2003)
- Tommy Berntsen (2003)
- Hans Knutsen and Espen Olafsen (2004–05)
- Hans Knutsen (2005)
- Henning Berg (2005–08)
- Kent Bergersen (2008–09)
- Gunnar Halle (2009–10)
- Finn Bredo Olsen (2011–14)
- Jonas Rygg (2014–2016)
- Thomas André Ødegaard (2016–2018)
- Bent Inge Johnsen (2019–2021)
- Jan Halvor Halvorsen (2022–2025)

== Women's football ==
The women's team began to play in 2009. In 2012, the team was promoted to the First Division. Following a 15-3-4 season in 2017, the team was promoted to the Toppserien, the top tier of Norwegian women's football.
