= 1970 Norwegian Football Cup =

Norgesmesterskapet i fotball for menn 1970

Tournament details
- Country: Norway
- Teams: 128 (main competition)

Final positions
- Champions: Strømsgodset (2nd title)
- Runners-up: Lyn

The 1970 Norwegian Football Cup was the 65th edition of the Norwegian annual knockout football tournament. The Cup was won by Strømsgodset after beating Lyn in the cup final with the score 4–2. This was Strømsgodset's second Norwegian Cup title.

== First round ==
| Team 1 | Score | Team 2 |
|---|---|---|
3 June 1970
| Odd | 3–0 | Jerv |
4 June 1970
| Rosenborg | 4–0 | Neset |
5 June 1970
| Arna | 1–0 | Ny-Krohnborg |
| Askim | 2–1 | Sagene |
| Borg | 0–4 | Fram (Larvik) |
| Brann | 2–1 (a.e.t.) | Florvåg |
| Brevik | 0–3 (a.e.t.) | Stag |
| Bryn | 3–1 | Clausenengen |
| Bryne | 5–1 | Vigrestad |
| Buøy | 3–3 (a.e.t.) | Brodd |
| Drafn | 3–2 | Kampørn |
| Egersund | 1–4 | Ulf |
| Eidsvold IF | 0–2 | Brumunddal |
| Eik | 0–2 | Teie |
| Elverum | 1–2 (a.e.t.) | HamKam |
| Falken | 0–1 | Ranheim |
| Fana | 2–3 (a.e.t.) | Bjarg |
| Flekkefjord | 1–1 | Kvinesdal |
| Fredrikstad | 2–0 | Tistedalen |
| Geithus | 1–2 (a.e.t.) | Mjøndalen |
| Gossen | 1–4 | Skarbøvik |
| Grue | 5–1 | Frigg |
| Hamar | 2–0 | Brekken |
| Harstad | 3–0 | Tromsø |
| Haugar | 3–0 | Jarl |
| Hødd | 4–1 | Herd |
| Jotun | 3–1 | Varegg |
| Kirkenes | 1–2 | Honningsvåg |
| Kongsvinger | 1–0 | Eidsvold Turn |
| Kopervik | 1–0 | Vard |
| Kristiansund | 2–0 | Molde |
| Kvik (Trondheim) | 3–1 | Nessegutten |
| Langevåg | 2–1 | Aalesund |
| Larvik Turn | 4–0 | Bamble |
| Lisleby | 3–0 | Kjelsås |
| Mo | 3–0 | Bodø/Glimt |
| Moss | 0–2 | Østsiden |
| Måløy | 4–5 | Bergsøy |
| Odda | 6–0 | Årstad |
| Os | 0–2 | Sandviken |
| Rakkestad | 2–1 | Aurskog |
| Raufoss | 2–0 | Reinsvoll |
| Raumnes & Årnes | 3–4 | Lillestrøm |
| Rindal | 0–1 | Løkken |
| Røros | 2–1 | Nordre Trysil |
| Sandefjord BK | 1–3 (a.e.t.) | Ørn |
| Skeid | 6–0 | Gamlebyen |
| Sogndal | 1–0 | Lena |
| Stabæk | 2–1 | Kvik (Halden) |
| Start | 1–1 (a.e.t.) | Donn |
| Stein | 0–1 | Mjølner |
| Stjørdals/Blink | 3–1 | Strinda |
| Strindheim | 0–3 | Nidelv |
| Strømmen | 0–2 | Ull/Kisa |
| Sverre | 1–3 | Steinkjer |
| Trosvik | 1–2 | Sarpsborg |
| Tønsberg Turn | 2–6 | Strømsgodset |
| Ulefoss | 0–8 | Pors |
| Vardal | 0–2 | Gjøvik-Lyn |
| Vidar | 0–4 | Viking |
| Vindbjart | 1–1 (a.e.t.) | Vigør |
| Vålerengen | 0–2 | Ready |
| Ørsta | 2–1 | Tornado |
7 June 1970
| Bærum | 0–3 | Lyn |
Replay: 14 June 1970
| Brodd | 2–4 | Buøy |
| Kvinesdal | 1–5 | Flekkefjord |
| Donn | 1–5 | Start |
| Vigør | 1–2 | Vindbjart |

== Second round ==
| Team 1 | Score | Team 2 |
|---|---|---|
25 June 1970
| Vindbjart | 0–3 | Odd |
26 June 1970
| Arna | 2–6 | Brann |
| Bjarg | 0–2 | Haugar |
| Brumunddal | 1–4 | Grue |
| Buøy | 0–1 | Bryne |
| Fram (Larvik) | 0–1 | Stabæk |
| Gjøvik-Lyn | 1–0 | Sogndal |
| HamKam | 3–0 | Kongsvinger |
| Hødd | 2–1 | Ørsta |
| Kvik (Trondheim) | 3–0 | Stjørdals/Blink |
| Langevåg | 3–2 | Bergsøy |
| Lillestrøm | 0–1 | Raufoss |
| Løkken | 0–1 (a.e.t.) | Ranheim |
| Mjølner | 2–0 | Honningsvåg |
| Mjøndalen | 4–0 | Hamar |
| Nidelv | 2–1 | Mo |
| Pors | 5–1 | Larvik Turn |
| Ready | 1–0 | Jotun |
| Sandviken | 1–0 (a.e.t.) | Odda |
| Sarpsborg | 1–2 | Askim |
| Skarbøvik | 0–1 | Kristiansund |
| Stag | 1–1 (a.e.t.) | Start |
| Steinkjer | 5–0 | Harstad |
| Strømsgodset | 6–0 | Rakkestad |
| Teie | 0–1 | Lisleby |
| Ulf | 1–1 (a.e.t.) | Kopervik |
| Ull/Kisa | 0–1 | Skeid |
| Viking | 5–1 | Flekkefjord |
| Østsiden | 1–2 (a.e.t.) | Drafn |
27 June 1970
| Lyn | 5–0 | Røros |
28 June 1970
| Bryn | 0–4 | Rosenborg |
| Ørn | 0–2 | Fredrikstad |
Replay: 4 July 1970
| Start | 3–1 | Stag |
| Kopervik | 2–0 | Ulf |

== Third round ==
| Team 1 | Score | Team 2 |
|---|---|---|
26 July 1970
| Askim | 1–2 | Mjøndalen |
| Skeid | 2–1 | Nidelv |
| Stabæk | 1–0 | Mjølner |
| Grue | 2–6 (a.e.t.) | HamKam |
| Raufoss | 4–2 | Kvik (Trondheim) |
| Odd | 0–2 | Lyn |
| Kristiansund | 0–5 | Hødd |
| Rosenborg | 4–1 | Langevåg |
| Ranheim | 0–1 | Steinkjer |
| Start | 2–4 | Strømsgodset |
| Haugar | 1–1 (a.e.t.) | Sandviken |
| Brann | 2–0 | Kopervik |
28 July 1970
| Lisleby | 2–1 | Pors |
29 July 1970
| Bryne | 2–0 (a.e.t.) | Viking |
| Fredrikstad | 5–0 | Ready |
| Drafn | 2–3 | Gjøvik-Lyn |
Replay: 29 July 1970
| Sandviken | 1–4 | Haugar |

== Fourth round ==
| Team 1 | Score | Team 2 |
|---|---|---|
9 August 1970
| Lyn | 2–1 | Haugar |
| Strømsgodset | 2–1 | Raufoss |
| Mjøndalen | 1–1 (a.e.t.) | Skeid |
| Gjøvik-Lyn | 2–1 | Rosenborg |
| HamKam | 2–1 | Lisleby |
| Brann | 1–1 (a.e.t.) | Bryne |
| Hødd | 0–1 (a.e.t.) | Stabæk |
| Steinkjer | 3–1 | Fredrikstad |
Replay: 20 August 1970
| Skeid | 0–1 | Mjøndalen |
| Bryne | 0–0 (a.e.t.) | Brann |
2nd replay: 27 August 1970
| Brann | 3–0 (Note: Played at Haugesund Stadion in Haugesund.) | Bryne |

== Quarter-finals ==
| Team 1 | Score | Team 2 |
|---|---|---|
30 August 1970
| Brann | 0–2 | Lyn |
| Gjøvik-Lyn | 0–3 | HamKam |
| Stabæk | 2–4 | Strømsgodset |
| Steinkjer | 2–1 | Mjøndalen |

== Semi-finals ==
4 October 1970

| Lyn | 0–0 | Steinkjer |

Ullevaal Stadion, Oslo
Attendance: 10,253

4 October 1970

| Strømsgodset | 7–0 | HamKam |
|---|---|---|
| Amundsen 15'; S. Pettersen 30', 89'; I. Pettersen 36'; Presberg 55', 58'; E. Olsen 87' |

Marienlyst Stadion, Drammen
Attendance: 14,000

=== Replay ===
18 October 1970

| Steinkjer | 0–1 | Lyn |
|---|---|---|
| | | Sandland 74' |

Guldbergaunet Stadion, Steinkjer
Attendance: 13,300

== Final ==
25 October 1970
13:15 CET (UTC+1)

| Strømsgodset | 4–2 | Lyn |
|---|---|---|
| Presberg 30' (pen.), 46'; I. Pettersen 67', 69' | Report | Christophersen 10', 37' |

Ullevaal Stadion, Oslo
Attendance: 25,744
Referee: Einar Røed (Tønsbergs TF)

Strømsgodset's winning squad: Inge Thun, Arild Mathisen, Jan Kristiansen, Tor Alsaker-Nøstdahl, Erik Eriksen, Odd Arild Amundsen, Egil Olsen, Bjørn Odmar Andersen, Steinar Pettersen, Thorodd Presberg, Ingar Pettersen; Ole Johnny Friise, Håvard Beckstrøm, Johnny Vidar Pedersen, Sverre Rørvik and Per Rune Wølner.

Lyn's team: Svein Bjørn Olsen, Jan Rodvang, Helge Østvold, Tore Børrehaug, Knut Kolle, Arild Gulden, Andreas Morisbak, Ola Dybwad-Olsen, Sven Otto Birkeland, Trygve Christophersen and Jon Palmer Austnes.
