= 1973 Norwegian Football Cup =

Norgesmesterskapet i fotball for menn 1973

Tournament details
- Country: Norway
- Teams: 128 (main competition)

Final positions
- Champions: Strømsgodset (3rd title)
- Runners-up: Rosenborg

The 1973 Norwegian Football Cup was the 68th edition of the Norwegian annual knockout football tournament. The Cup was won by Strømsgodset after beating Rosenborg in the cup final with the score 1–0. This was Strømsgodset's third Norwegian Cup title.

== First round ==
Team 1	Score	Team 2
31 May 1973
Andenes	2–1	Bardufoss
Arna	1–4 (a.e.t.)	Brann
Asker	2–0	Aurskog
Bjarg	0–2	Odda
Brumunddal	3–1	Nybergsund
Bryne	0–0 (a.e.t.)	Ulf
Falken	3–0	Henning
Fana	3–1	Nordnes
Flekkefjord	0–2	Viking
Florvåg	4–4 (a.e.t.)	Ny-Krohnborg
Folldal	1–1 (a.e.t.)	Kvik (Trondheim)
Fram (Larvik)	1–2 (a.e.t.)	Moss
Frigg	1–0 (a.e.t.)	Abildsø
Gjøvik-Lyn	4–0	Faaberg
Gossen	0–3	Aalesund
Grue	1–0	Askim
HamKam	1–0	Hamar
Hardy	1–3	Os
Harstad	5–1	Stein
Hasselvika	0–1	Strinda
Haugar	2–0	Djerv 1919
Herd	1–0	Bergsøy
Holmestrand	1–3	Drafn
Hødd	0–1	Åndalsnes
Jevnaker	0–0 (a.e.t.)	Raufoss
Kongsvinger	2–3	Eidsvold Turn
Kvik (Halden)	0–2 (a.e.t.)	Sarpsborg
Kvinesdal	1–2	Jerv
Lillestrøm	8–0	Raumnes & Årnes
Lisleby	4–4 (a.e.t.)	Selbak
Liv	0–5	Strømsgodset
Løkken	0–1	Sunndal
Molde	4–0	Velledalen/Ringen
Nidelv	1–2	Sverresborg
Nordlandet	1–0	Clausenengen
Norild	2–0	Kirkenes
Reinsvoll	1–0	Redalen
Sagene	1–6	Vålerengen
Sandar	1–6	Mjøndalen
Skarbøvik	2–1	Ørsta
Skeid	8–1	Manglerud/Star
Slemmestad	3–1	Skiold
Snøgg	0–4	Åssiden
Sogndal	0–2	Varegg
Sprint/Jeløy	0–4	Østsiden
Start	2–1	Brevik
Stavanger	2–5	Vard
Steinkjer	2–1	Verdal
Stjørdals/Blink	1–0	Nessegutten
Stord	2–1	Baune
Storm	2–1	Pors
Stålkameratene	3–1	Bodø/Glimt
Sykkylven	0–2	Langevåg
Søndre Høland	0–3	Fredrikstad
Tornado	5–1	Dale Fjaler
Ull/Kisa	1–0	Greåker
Urædd	0–3	Larvik Turn
Vidar	2–1	Mandalskameratene
Vigrestad	3–1	Buøy
Vindbjart	1–0	Sandefjord BK
Ørn	0–2	Stabæk
Øvrevoll	0–0 (a.e.t.)	Lyn
3 June 1973
Neset	1–4	Rosenborg
5 June 1973
Odd	2–0	Eik
Replay: 7 June 1973
Kvik (Trondheim)	2–1	Folldal
Lyn	2–0	Øvrevoll
Ny-Krohnborg	1–4	Florvåg
Raufoss	4–1	Jevnaker
Selbak	1–1 (a.e.t.)	Lisleby
Ulf	1–2	Bryne
2nd replay: 14 June 1973
Lisleby	5–0	Selbak

== Second round ==
Team 1	Score	Team 2
14 June 1973
Brann	1–0	Stord
Bryne	0–2	Haugar
Drafn	0–2	Strømsgodset
Eidsvold Turn	2–0	Reinsvoll
Fredrikstad	1–0	Brumunddal
Harstad	1–0	Norild
Jerv	0–5	Frigg
Larvik Turn	4–0	Storm
Mjøndalen	1–0	Slemmestad
Moss	0–1	Grue
Nordlandet	0–2	Molde
Odd	1–0	Vindbjart
Odda	1–2 (a.e.t.)	Fana
Raufoss	4–0	Gjøvik-Lyn
Rosenborg	4–0	Andenes
Sarpsborg	6–2	Asker
Stabæk	2–3	Lillestrøm
Start	2–0	Vidar
Stjørdals/Blink	1–0	Kvik (Trondheim)
Strinda	2–2 (a.e.t.)	Sverresborg
Stålkameratene	2–0	Steinkjer
Sunndal	0–0 (a.e.t.)	Falken
Tornado	6–0	Herd
Vard	0–1 (a.e.t.)	Os
Varegg	2–1	Florvåg
Viking	4–0	Vigrestad
Vålerengen	1–0	Ull/Kisa
Østsiden	0–2	HamKam
Aalesund	0–0 (a.e.t.)	Langevåg
Åndalsnes	1–0	Skarbøvik
Åssiden	0–4	Skeid
20 June 1973
Lyn	1–2 (a.e.t.)	Lisleby
Replay: 20 June 1973
Falken	1–3	Sunndal
Langevåg	3–0 (a.e.t.)	Aalesund
Sverresborg	0–5	Strinda

== Third round ==
Team 1	Score	Team 2
27 June 1973
Molde	2–0	Sunndal
Raufoss	4–2	Strinda
Stjørdals/Blink	0–1	Stålkameratene
28 June 1973
Grue	3–3 (a.e.t.)	Fredrikstad
HamKam	2–1	Åndalsnes
Strømsgodset	1–0	Varegg
Haugar	1–6	Viking
Fana	0–7	Brann
Rosenborg	3–1	Harstad
Larvik Turn	1–0	Start
29 June 1973
Lisleby	1–2	Eidsvold Turn
Frigg	3–0	Sarpsborg
1 July 1973
Skeid	3–0	Odd
Lillestrøm	5–3	Mjøndalen
Os	2–1	Vålerengen
4 July 1973
Langevåg	2–1	Tornado
Replay: 4 July 1973
Fredrikstad	4–1 (a.e.t.)	Grue

== Fourth round ==
Team 1	Score	Team 2
19 August 1973
Skeid	0–5	Lillestrøm
Stålkameratene	1–2	Strømsgodset
Viking	3–2	Os
Molde	1–0	Raufoss
Brann	4–0	Frigg
Eidsvold Turn	1–4	Rosenborg
HamKam	1–0	Langevåg
Fredrikstad	3–1	Larvik Turn

== Quarter-finals ==
2 September 1973

Rosenborg	3–0	Molde
Iversen 23', 41'; Farstad 75'

Lerkendal Stadion, Trondheim
Attendance: 15,400

2 September 1973

Fredrikstad	0–1	HamKam
		Torvik 46'

Fredrikstad Stadion, Fredrikstad
Attendance: 4,727

2 September 1973

Strømsgodset	1–0	Lillestrøm
S. Pettersen 89'

Marienlyst Stadion, Drammen
Attendance: 12,000

2 September 1973

Viking	1–0	Brann
Vold 10'

Stavanger Stadion, Stavanger
Attendance: 15,200

== Semi-finals ==
26 September 1973

Strømsgodset	1–0	Viking
Presberg 87'

Marienlyst Stadion, Drammen
Attendance: 11,147
Referee: Kjell Wahlen

26 September 1973

HamKam	0–2	Rosenborg
		Iversen 5'; Antonsen 47' (o.g.)

Briskeby Gressbane, Hamar
Attendance: 7,782
Referee: Rolf H. Andersen

== Final ==
21 October 1973
13:15 CET (UTC+1)

Strømsgodset	1–0	Rosenborg
S. Pettersen 78' (pen.)	Report

Ullevaal Stadion, Oslo
Attendance: 23,209
Referee: Svein-Inge Thime (Stavanger)

Strømsgodset's winning squad: Inge Thun, Per Rune Wøllner, Johnny Vidar Pedersen, Tor Alsaker-Nøstdahl, Svein Dahl Andersen, Odd Arild Amundsen, Finn Aksel Olsen, Bjørn Odmar Andersen, Thorodd Presberg, Steinar Pettersen, Ingar Pettersen, Bjørn Erik Halvorsen, Helge Widemann Karlsen and Runar Larsen.
