= 1972 Norwegian Football Cup =

Norgesmesterskapet i fotball for menn 1972

Tournament details
- Country: Norway
- Teams: 128 (main competition)

Final positions
- Champions: Brann (3rd title)
- Runners-up: Rosenborg

The 1972 Norwegian Football Cup was the 67th edition of the Norwegian annual knockout football tournament. The Cup was won by Brann after beating Rosenborg in the cup final with the score 1–0. This was Brann's third Norwegian Cup title.

== First round ==
Team 1	Score	Team 2
1 June 1972
Andenes	0–1	Bodø/Glimt
Arna	1–3	Baune
Askim	0–3	Lillestrøm
Aurskog	4–2	Sprint/Jeløy
Beitstad	1–3	Neset
Brann	3–1	Bjarg
Brodd	4–2	Flekkefjord
Bækkelaget	3–2 (a.e.t.)	Skeid
Clausenengen	3–0	Bryn
Donn	0–2	Stag
Drafn	2–0	Geithus
Eidsvold Turn	9–0	Flisa
Eik	2–7	Slemmestad
Falken	3–0	Brekken
Fana	2–3 (a.e.t.)	Florvåg
Grane	0–2	Odd
HamKam	6–0	Faaberg
Jerv	0–0 (a.e.t.)	Start
Kirkenes	1–2 (a.e.t.)	Tromsø
Kjelsås	1–0 (a.e.t.)	Frigg
Kvik (Trondheim)	0–2	Steinkjer
Langesund	5–3 (a.e.t.)	Ørn
Langevåg	2–4	Bergsøy
Larvik Turn	4–0	Sporty
Lyn	3–0	Søndre Høland
Lyngen	1–1 (a.e.t.)	Stein
Manglerud/Star	2–1	Ready
Mjølner	1–1 (a.e.t.)	Landsås
Mjøndalen	2–2 (a.e.t.)	Vikersund
Moss	3–1	Kvik (Halden)
Nordre Trysil	1–2	Brumunddal
Odda	3–2 (a.e.t.)	Ny-Krohnborg
Os	2–0	Nordnes
Pors	3–1	Snøgg
Raufoss	5–1	Skreia
Raumnes & Årnes	1–3	Grue
Rolvsøy	0–2	Fredrikstad
Rosenborg	5–0	Stjørdals/Blink
Røros	2–1	Lillehammer
Sandefjord BK	3–1	Sandar
Sarpsborg	3–1	Sparta
Skiold	0–4	Fram (Larvik)
Stabæk	2–1	Abildsø
Strinda	0–1	Tryggkam
Strømmen	2–0	Gjøvik-Lyn
Stålkameratene	1–3	Nessegutten
Sunndal	1–0	Nidelv
Tornado Måløy	3–6	Skarbøvik
Ull/Kisa	6–1	Sagene
Vard	2–1	Haugar
Varegg	1–2	Stord
Velledalen/Ringen	0–1 (a.e.t.)	Hødd
Verdal	3–1	Sverre
Vestfossen	0–4	Strømsgodset
Vidar	0–0 (a.e.t.)	Klepp
Vigrestad	1–2	Ulf
Viking	8–0	Avaldsnes
Vålerengen	5–0	Øvrevoll
Ørsta	1–0	Måløy
Østsiden	3–0	Lisleby
Aalesund	1–0 (a.e.t.)	Herd
Åndalsnes	0–2	Molde
Årdalstangen	0–3 (a.e.t.)	Sogndal
5 June 1972
Ålgård	2–6	Bryne
Replay: 5 June 1972
Klepp	2–1 (a.e.t.)	Vidar
Landsås	0–1	Mjølner
Start	2–1	Jerv
Stein	2–3	Lyngen
Vikersund	0–1	Mjøndalen

== Second round ==
Team 1	Score	Team 2
21 June 1972
Odd	2–1	Larvik Turn
22 June 1972
Aurskog	2–0	Østsiden
Baune	1–4	Brann
Bodø/Glimt	1–0	Mjølner
Brumunddal	2–1	Ull/Kisa
Eidsvold Turn	0–2	Mjøndalen
Fram (Larvik)	6–1	Pors
Fredrikstad	3–1	Bækkelaget
Grue	1–0	Stabæk
HamKam	2–2 (a.e.t.)	Kjelsås
Hødd	3–1	Ørsta
Klepp	1–2	Viking
Lillestrøm	2–1 (a.e.t.)	Vålerengen
Lyn	2–1	Manglerud/Star
Molde	8–0	Bergsøy
Moss	5–1	Drafn
Neset	3–4	Verdal
Nessegutten	2–0	Falken
Raufoss	2–2 (a.e.t.)	Strømmen
Røros	0–5	Rosenborg
Skarbøvik	1–0 (a.e.t.)	Aalesund
Slemmestad	0–2	Sarpsborg
Sogndal	2–4 (a.e.t.)	Florvåg
Stag	2–2 (a.e.t.)	Sandefjord BK
Start	0–2	Bryne
Steinkjer	3–1	Tryggkam
Stord	4–1	Os
Strømsgodset	7–0	Langesund
Sunndal	1–2 (a.e.t.)	Clausenengen
Tromsø	2–1	Lyngen
Ulf	2–1	Brodd
Vard	1–1 (a.e.t.)	Odda
Replay: 25 June 1972
Kjelsås	3–5	HamKam
Odda	2–0	Vard
Sandefjord BK	3–2	Stag
Strømmen	0–2	Raufoss

== Third round ==
Team 1	Score	Team 2
4 July 1972
Rosenborg	4–0	Nessegutten
5 July 1972
Clausenengen	3–1	Skarbøvik
Florvåg	2–3	Stord
Fredrikstad	0–2	Raufoss
Molde	5–3	Hødd
Sarpsborg	2–1 (a.e.t.)	Brumunddal
Tromsø	0–1	Steinkjer
Verdal	0–2	Bodø/Glimt
Viking	6–1	Ulf
6 July 1972
Bryne	1–1 (a.e.t.)	Fram (Larvik)
HamKam	3–1	Moss
Mjøndalen	2–0	Aurskog
Odd	0–2	Lillestrøm
Sandefjord BK	2–3	Strømsgodset
7 July 1972
Grue	3–1	Lyn
9 July 1972
Odda	0–4	Brann
Replay: 13 July 1972
Fram (Larvik)	0–1	Bryne

== Fourth round ==
Team 1	Score	Team 2
20 August 1972
Strømsgodset	3–1	Grue
Raufoss	2–0	HamKam
Stord	1–0	Viking
Bodø/Glimt	0–2	Mjøndalen
Lillestrøm	0–3	Sarpsborg
Steinkjer	0–0 (a.e.t.)	Rosenborg
Bryne	0–0 (a.e.t.)	Molde
Brann	1–0	Clausenengen
Replay: 23 August 1972
Rosenborg	2–1	Steinkjer
Molde	1–2	Bryne

== Quarter-finals ==
Team 1	Score	Team 2
3 September 1972
Sarpsborg	2–0	Raufoss
Rosenborg	2–1	Strømsgodset
Mjøndalen	1–0	Stord
Brann	2–1	Bryne

== Semi-finals ==
11 October 1972

Sarpsborg	0–2	Brann
		Spyrevold 37' (o.g.); Larsen 75'

Sarpsborg Stadion, Sarpsborg
Attendance: 4,586
Referee: Henry Øberg

17 October 1972

Rosenborg	2–0	Mjøndalen
Christiansen 60'; Wirkola 73'

Lerkendal Stadion, Trondheim
Attendance: 5,235
Referee: Inge Thime

== Final ==
22 October 1972
13:15 CET (UTC+1)

Brann	1–0	Rosenborg
Osland 13'	Report

Ullevaal Stadion, Oslo
Attendance: 17,700
Referee: Kjell Wahlen (Skeid)

Brann's winning squad: Oddvar Trææn, Helge Karlsen, Rune Pedersen, Ole Kobbeltvedt, Tore Nordtvedt, Frode Larsen (Torgeir Hauge 60), Erling Mikkelsen (Atle Bilsback 75), Arnfinn Espeseth, Roald Jensen, Kjell Øyasæter and Jan Erik Osland.

Rosenborg's squad: Øivind Brynte Torp, Erling Meirik, Kåre Rønnes, Bjørn Rime, Øystein Wormdal, Jan Christiansen, Anders Farstad, Tore Lindseth, Harald Sunde, Bjørn Wirkola and Arne Hanssen.
