= 1971 Norwegian Football Cup =

Norgesmesterskapet i fotball for menn 1971

Tournament details
- Country: Norway
- Teams: 128 (main competition)

Final positions
- Champions: Rosenborg (3rd title)
- Runners-up: Fredrikstad

The 1971 Norwegian Football Cup was the 66th edition of the Norwegian annual knockout football tournament. The Cup was won by Rosenborg after beating Fredrikstad in the cup final with the score 4–1. This was Rosenborg's third Norwegian Cup title.

== First round ==
Team 1	Score	Team 2
3 June 1971
Hasselvika	1–8	Rosenborg
Ny-Krohnborg	0–1	Brann
Viking	5–0	Ålgård
4 June 1971
Lyn	4–2	Askim
5 June 1971
Odd	0–0 (a.e.t.)	Donn
6 June 1971
Arna	0–1	Bjarg
Baune	4–8 (a.e.t.)	Varegg
Bodø/Glimt	3–2	Stein
Brekken	0–1	Kvik (Trondheim)
Brumunddal	1–1 (a.e.t.)	Raufoss
Clausenengen	4–0	Åndalsnes
Drammens BK	1–3	Frigg
Egersund	3–2	Flekkefjord
Eidsvold Turn	2–0	Strømmen
Florvåg	5–2	Kopervik
Fram (Larvik)	3–0	Langesund
Fredrikstad	3–1	Gresvik
Geithus	0–2	Skiold
Gossen	5–1	Harøy
Grane	2–2 (a.e.t.)	Pors
Greåker	0–1	Sarpsborg
Grue	2–1 (a.e.t.)	Nordre Trysil
Haugar	4–1	Buøy
Holmestrand	2–3 (a.e.t.)	Eik
Hødd	5–2 (a.e.t.)	Bergsøy
Jotun	0–2	Vardal
Klepp	1–2 (a.e.t.)	Bryne
Kongsvinger	2–2 (a.e.t.)	Vålerengen
Kvik (Halden)	0–1	Østsiden
Lillehammer	0–1	HamKam
Lillestrøm	6–1	Grorud
Lisleby	2–1	Tistedalen
Mjølner	4–0	Harstad
Mjøndalen	3–0	Jevnaker
Mo	3–0	Mosjøen
Molde	2–0	Herd
Måløy	3–6	Langevåg
Neset	1–0	Tryggkam
Nessegutten	1–0	Sverre
Nidelv	0–2	Røros
Nordre Høland	0–5	Aurskog
Orkanger	2–3	Falken
Os	4–1	Odda
Polarstjernen	2–1	Norild
Ready	2–0	Moss
Ringsaker	1–9	Gjøvik-Lyn
Runar	0–1	Larvik Turn
Skarp	2–1	Lyngen
Skeid	3–1	Sagene
Snøgg	1–0	Drafn
Sogndal	2–0	Dale Fjaler
Stag	2–1	Borre
Steinkjer	2–0 (a.e.t.)	Strinda
Stjørdals/Blink	1–2	Verdal
Stord	0–2	Vard
Strømsgodset	2–0	Kjelsås
Ulf	0–1	Vidar
Urædd	0–3	Sandefjord BK
Velledalen/Ringen	0–1	Skarbøvik
Vigør	1–2	Start
Vikersund	0–1 (a.e.t.)	Stabæk
Ørn	5–2	Feie
Øvrevoll	1–2 (a.e.t.)	Ull/Kisa
Aalesund	1–1 (a.e.t.)	Ørsta
Replay: 16 June 1971
Donn	1–0	Odd
Pors	3–0	Grane
Raufoss	4–1	Brumunddal
Vålerengen	3–1	Kongsvinger
Ørsta	0–3	Aalesund

== Second round ==
Team 1	Score	Team 2
20 June 1971
Aurskog	0–1	Lillestrøm
Bodø/Glimt	6–1	Skarp
Bryne	6–1	Bjarg
Donn	3–2	Fram (Larvik)
Egersund	0–9	Viking
Falken	4–1	Clausenengen
Gjøvik-Lyn	0–3	Fredrikstad
Larvik Turn	1–0	Skeid
Mjølner	4–0	Polarstjernen
Mo	1–2	Neset
Molde	1–0	Gossen
Pors	4–2 (a.e.t.)	Stag
Raufoss	3–0	Ready
Røros	3–1 (a.e.t.)	Steinkjer
Sandefjord BK	1–5	Mjøndalen
Skarbøvik	0–2	Aalesund
Skiold	2–1	Lisleby
Stabæk	0–0 (a.e.t.)	Vålerengen
Start	1–4	Vidar
Ull/Kisa	0–1	Eidsvold Turn
Vard	5–1	Florvåg
Varegg	3–1	Haugar
Verdal	0–0 (a.e.t.)	Nessegutten
Østsiden	1–0	Ørn
24 June 1971
Brann	5–0	Os
Eik	0–3	Lyn
Frigg	2–3	Snøgg
HamKam	5–0	Sogndal
Langevåg	3–3 (a.e.t.)	Hødd
Sarpsborg	3–1	Grue
Vardal	2–8	Strømsgodset
25 June 1971
Rosenborg	5–1	Kvik (Trondheim)
Replay: 24 June 1971
Nessegutten	2–0	Verdal
Vålerengen	2–0	Stabæk
Replay: 27 June 1971
Hødd	4–2	Langevåg

== Third round ==
Team 1	Score	Team 2
25 July 1971
Fredrikstad	4–0	Røros
Vålerengen	3–0	Brann
Lillestrøm	1–4	HamKam
Mjøndalen	2–0	Skiold
Strømsgodset	5–0	Donn
Snøgg	1–5	Sarpsborg
Hødd	2–3	Varegg
28 July 1971
Lyn	4–0	Bryne
Viking	3–1	Larvik Turn
Rosenborg	1–0	Falken
1 August 1971
Eidsvold Turn	2–4	Pors
Raufoss	0–1	Østsiden
Vidar	1–2	Vard
Aalesund	1–0	Bodø/Glimt
Neset	2–2 (a.e.t.)	Molde
Nessegutten	0–5	Mjølner
Replay: 5 August 1971
Molde	1–0	Neset

== Fourth round ==
Team 1	Score	Team 2
15 August 1971
Sarpsborg	4–0	Vålerengen
Østsiden	0–2	Strømsgodset
HamKam	2–0	Mjøndalen
Pors	0–3	Fredrikstad
Vard	1–2	Viking
Varegg	1–0	Lyn
Mjølner	2–1	Aalesund
Molde	0–1	Rosenborg

== Quarter-finals ==
Team 1	Score	Team 2
29 August 1971
Fredrikstad	4–3	Viking
Strømsgodset	1–2	HamKam
Rosenborg	0–0 (a.e.t.)	Varegg
Mjølner	0–1	Sarpsborg
Replay: 2 September 1971
Varegg	0–1	Rosenborg

== Semi-finals ==
3 October 1971

HamKam	0–5	Rosenborg
		Wirkola 1', 69', 80'; Mørkved 57'; Hanssen 65'

Briskeby gressbane, Hamar
Attendance: 11,000
Referee: Svein-Inge Thime

3 October 1971

Sarpsborg	0–2	Fredrikstad
		Johansen 15'; Sandhaug 41'

Sarpsborg Stadion, Sarpsborg
Attendance: 15,015
Referee: Henry Øberg

== Final ==
24 October 1971
13:15 CET (UTC+1)

Rosenborg	4–1	Fredrikstad
Christiansen 14'; Hanssen 57'; Wirkola 61'; Mørkved 85'	Report	Johansen 80' (pen.)

Ullevaal Stadion, Oslo
Attendance: 25,180
Referee: Rolf Nyhus (Nordstrand)
