= 1969 Norwegian Football Cup =

Norgesmesterskapet i fotball for menn 1969

Tournament details
- Country: Norway
- Teams: 128 (main competition)

Final positions
- Champions: Strømsgodset (1st title)
- Runners-up: Fredrikstad

The 1969 Norwegian Football Cup was the 64th edition of the Norwegian annual knockout football tournament. The Cup was won by Strømsgodset after they beat Fredrikstad in the cup final. It took a replay to decide the winner. This was Strømsgodset's first Norwegian Cup title.

== First round ==
Team 1	Score	Team 2
4 June 1969
Aurskog	2–0	Askim
Bjørkelangen	1–1 (a.e.t.)	Strømmen
Brumunddal	0–2	Lillehammer
Clausenengen	4–2	Kvik (Trondheim)
Djerv	0–1	Bjarg
Donn	0–1	Flekkefjord
Drafn	7–0	Kongsberg
Egersund	3–2	Klepp
Eidsvold Turn	1–1 (a.e.t.)	Bærum
Enebakk	0–3	Stabæk
Florvåg	3–1	Ny-Krohnborg
Flå	4–2	Brekstad
Fram (Larvik)	2–3	Brevik
Frigg	2–1	Åssiden
Gjøvik-Lyn	2–0	Kapp
Gossen	3–2	Rindal
Grue	1–2	Skeid
HamKam	2–1	Eidsvold IF
Herd	2–1	Bergsøy
Hokksund	1–5	Strømsgodset
Jotun	2–0	Sogndal
Kampørn	1–3	Vålerengen
Lena	0–4	Raufoss
Lillestrøm	2–2 (a.e.t.)	Ready
Lisleby	5–0	Rapid
Lyn	5–1	Sparta
Mjølner	2–3	Kirkenes
Mjøndalen	11–0	Fossekallen
Molde	8–0	Træff
Moss	2–3 (a.e.t.)	Torp
Nordre Trysil	1–3 (a.e.t.)	Flisa
Neset	0–3	Mo
Nidelv	1–0	Folldal
Odd	5–0	Herkules
Os	3–0	Årstad
Pors	2–0	Bamble
Randaberg	0–2	Bryne
Ranheim	0–4	Rosenborg
Runar	0–1	Eik
Røa	1–2 (a.e.t.)	Sagene
Røros	3–1	Hamar
Sandefjord BK	2–0	Nanset
Sarpsborg	4–1	Borgen Sarpsborg
Skarbøvik	1–2	Aalesund
Spjelkavik	2–2 (a.e.t.)	Langevåg
Sprint/Jeløy	0–3	Fredrikstad
Stag	3–1	Larvik Turn
Stein	4–0	Harstad
Steinkjer	5–1	Namsos
Stord	3–0 (a.e.t.)	Odda
Sverre	3–0	Stjørdals/Blink
Sørfjell	0–1	Start
Tromsø	0–5	Bodø/Glimt
Vard	6–1	Jarl
Varegg	1–4	Brann
Velledalen/Ringen	1–2	Hødd
Verdal	1–0	Falken
Vidar	0–1	Haugar
Vigrestad	3–2	Ulf
Vigør	1–0	Grane
Viking	2–1	Buøy
Ørn	0–1	Sandar
Ørsta	0–1	Stryn
Østsiden	0–0 (a.e.t.)	Greåker
Replay: Unknown date
Bærum	0–3	Eidsvold Turn
Greåker	1–0	Østsiden
Langevåg	3–5	Spjelkavik
Ready	2–3	Lillestrøm
Strømmen	2–0 (a.e.t.)	Bjørkelangen

== Second round ==
Team 1	Score	Team 2
25 June 1969
Bodø/Glimt	4–0	Nidelv
Brann	5–0	Bjarg
Brevik	0–4	Pors
Bryne	5–1	Vard
Eik	1–2	Lisleby
Flekkefjord	5–0	Vigør
Flisa	0–5	Lyn
Flå	1–2	Verdal
Fredrikstad	3–0	Sandefjord BK
Greåker	2–1	Vålerengen
HamKam	5–0	Røros
Haugar	3–0	Stord
Hødd	2–1	Spjelkavik
Kirkenes	0–1	Stein
Lillehammer	2–1 (a.e.t.)	Frigg
Mo	1–5	Steinkjer
Molde	2–2 (a.e.t.)	Clausenengen
Os	2–1 (a.e.t.)	Florvåg
Raufoss	6–0	Jotun
Sagene	1–2	Mjøndalen
Sandar	1–2	Sarpsborg
Skeid	3–1	Gjøvik-Lyn
Stabæk	0–1	Eidsvold Turn
Start	8–0	Egersund
Stryn	3–0	Herd
Strømmen	1–0	Aurskog
Strømsgodset	3–2 (a.e.t.)	Lillestrøm
Torp	1–3	Stag
Viking	3–0	Vigrestad
Aalesund	1–2	Gossen
26 June 1969
Odd	0–2	Drafn
Rosenborg	6–1	Sverre
Replay: Unknown date
Clausenengen	2–1 (a.e.t.)	Molde

== Third round ==
Team 1	Score	Team 2
2 July 1969
Os	4–2 (a.e.t.)	Bryne
4 July 1969
Eidsvold Turn	1–2	Strømsgodset
Haugar	1–1 (a.e.t.)	Brann
Lyn	0–1	Greåker
6 July 1969
Lisleby	0–1	Skeid
Steinkjer	9–1	Stein
Clausenengen	3–1	Gossen
Bodø/Glimt	2–5	HamKam
Sarpsborg	4–0	Lillehammer
Drafn	0–1 (a.e.t.)	Viking
Hødd	4–0	Stryn
Stag	0–3	Fredrikstad
Pors	1–2	Start
Mjøndalen	5–1	Flekkefjord
Verdal	0–2	Rosenborg
Strømmen	2–3	Raufoss
Replay: 9 July 1969
Brann	1–0	Haugar

== Fourth round ==
Team 1	Score	Team 2
2 August 1969
Viking	2–1	Brann
3 August 1969
Skeid	4–0	Steinkjer
Strømsgodset	5–1	Clausenengen
HamKam	3–0	Sarpsborg
Greåker	1–1 (a.e.t.)	Hødd
Fredrikstad	4–0	Os
Start	1–2	Mjøndalen
Rosenborg	2–0	Raufoss
Replay: 23 August 1969
Hødd	3–0	Greåker

== Quarter-finals ==
Team 1	Score	Team 2
7 September 1969
Skeid	4–4 (a.e.t.)	Strømsgodset
HamKam	1–0	Viking
Hødd	1–3	Fredrikstad
Mjøndalen	2–1	Rosenborg
Replay: 24 September 1969
Strømsgodset	2–1	Skeid

== Semi-finals ==
Team 1	Score	Team 2
5 October 1969
Strømsgodset	0–0 (a.e.t.)	HamKam
Fredrikstad	2–0	Mjøndalen
Replay: 8 October 1969
HamKam	1–2	Strømsgodset

== Final ==
=== First match ===
26 October 1969

Strømsgodset	2–2 (a.e.t.)	Fredrikstad
I. Pettersen 61'; Presberg 90'	Report	J. Fuglset 55'; Arntsen 83'

Ullevaal Stadion, Oslo
Attendance: 27,529
Referee: Rolf H. Andersen (Skeid)

=== Replay match ===
2 November 1969

Strømsgodset	5–3	Fredrikstad
Olsen 16'; Presberg 25'; Alsaker-Nøstdahl 61'; I. Pettersen 66'; S. Pettersen 71'	Report	T. Fuglset 27'; Spydevold 34'; J. Fuglset 63'

Ullevaal Stadion, Oslo
Attendance: 24,022
Referee: Kåre Sirevaag (Viking)
