= 1969 in Norwegian football =

Football in Norway
- Season: 1969

Men's football
- 1. divisjon: Rosenborg
- 2. divisjon: Pors (Group A); Hamarkameratene (Group B)
- Cupen: Strømsgodset

The 1969 season was the 64th season of competitive football in Norway.

== Men's football ==
=== League season ===
==== Promotion and relegation ====
League	Promoted to league	Relegated from league
1. divisjon	Start; Hødd	Frigg; Vålerengen
2. divisjon	Stag; Stabæk; Haugar; Falken	Odd; Vard; Steinkjer; Gjøvik-Lyn

==== 1. divisjon ====
Rosenborg BK won the league for the second time in 1969.

Pos	Team	Pld	W	D	L	GF	GA	GD	Pts	Qualification or relegation
1	Rosenborg (C)	18	13	1	4	36	15	+21	27	Qualification for the European Cup first round
2	Fredrikstad	18	8	6	4	28	15	+13	22	
3	Strømsgodset	18	8	6	4	34	22	+12	22	Qualification for the Cup Winners' Cup first round
4	Skeid	18	9	2	7	29	22	+7	20	
5	Viking	18	6	6	6	18	17	+1	18	
6	Brann	18	6	6	6	20	26	−6	18	
7	Sarpsborg FK	18	6	5	7	22	22	0	17	Qualification for the Inter-Cities Fairs Cup first round
8	Hødd	18	4	4	10	24	39	−15	12	
9	Start (R)	18	5	2	11	20	35	−15	12	Relegation to Second Division
10	Lyn (R)	18	4	4	10	21	39	−18	12	Relegation to Second Division

Source: NIFS
Rules for classification: 1) points; 2) goal difference; 3) number of goals scored.
(C) Champions; (R) Relegated

==== 2. divisjon ====
===== Group A =====
Pos	Team	Pld	W	D	L	GF	GA	GD	Pts	Promotion, qualification or relegation
1	Pors (C, P)	14	10	2	2	36	14	+22	22	Promotion to First Division
2	Vålerengen	14	9	1	4	24	13	+11	19	
3	Mjøndalen	14	5	4	5	23	17	+6	14	
4	Bryne	14	5	4	5	23	20	+3	14	
5	Haugar	14	5	3	6	21	21	0	13	
6	Eik	14	4	3	7	14	29	−15	11	
7	Stag (R)	14	5	0	9	16	35	−19	10	Relegation to Third Division
8	Vigør (R)	14	2	5	7	9	17	−8	9	Relegation to Third Division

Source: rsssf.no
Rules for classification: 1) points; 2) goal difference; 3) number of goals scored.
(C) Champions; (P) Promoted; (R) Relegated

===== Group B =====
Pos	Team	Pld	W	D	L	GF	GA	GD	Pts	Promotion, qualification or relegation
1	Hamarkameratene (C, P)	14	9	4	1	22	10	+12	22	Promotion to First Division
2	Stabæk	14	8	1	5	28	18	+10	17	
3	Aalesund	14	7	3	4	25	15	+10	17	
4	Raufoss	14	6	4	4	32	25	+7	16	
5	Aurskog	14	6	1	7	14	19	−5	13	
6	Frigg	14	4	4	6	16	18	−2	12	
7	Ørn (R)	14	5	0	9	21	33	−12	10	Relegation to Third Division
8	Falken (R)	14	1	3	10	13	33	−20	5	Relegation to Third Division

Source: rsssf.no
Rules for classification: 1) points; 2) goal difference; 3) number of goals scored.
(C) Champions; (P) Promoted; (R) Relegated

== Cup competitions ==
=== Norwegian Cup ===
Strømsgodset won the 1969 Norwegian Cup. It was their first of two second consecutive cup wins.

==== Final ====
26 October 1969

Strømsgodset	2–2 (a.e.t.)	Fredrikstad
I. Pettersen 61'; Presberg 90'	Report	J. Fuglset 55'; Arntsen 83'

Ullevaal Stadion, Oslo
Attendance: 27,529
Referee: Rolf H. Andersen (Skeid)

Replay

2 November 1969

Strømsgodset	5–3	Fredrikstad
Olsen 16'; Presberg 25'; Alsaker-Nøstdahl 61'; I. Pettersen 66'; S. Pettersen 71'	Report	T. Fuglset 27'; Spydevold 34'; J. Fuglset 63'

Ullevaal Stadion, Oslo
Attendance: 24,022
Referee: Kåre Sirevaag (Viking)

=== Northern Norwegian Cup ===
==== Final ====
Bodø/Glimt	3–2	Mjølner
	Report

== UEFA competitions ==
=== European Cup ===
==== First round ====
Team 1	Agg.	Team 2	1st leg	2nd leg
Leeds United (England)	16–0	(Norway) Lyn	10–0	6–0

=== European Cup Winners' Cup ===
==== First round ====
Team 1	Agg.	Team 2	1st leg	2nd leg
Mjøndalen (Norway)	2–12	(Wales) Cardiff City	1–7	1–5

=== Inter-Cities Fairs Cup ===
==== First round ====
Team 1	Agg.	Team 2	1st leg	2nd leg
Rosenborg (Norway)	1–2	(England) Southampton	1–0	0–2
1860 Munich (West Germany)	3–4	(Norway) Skeid	2–2	1–2

==== Second round ====
Team 1	Agg.	Team 2	1st leg	2nd leg
Skeid (Norway)	0–2	(Romania) Dinamo Bacău	0–0	0–2
