= 1970 in Norwegian football =

Football in Norway
- Season: 1970

Men's football
- 1. divisjon: Strømsgodset
- 2. divisjon: Frigg (Group A); Lyn (Group B)
- Cupen: Strømsgodset

The 1970 season was the 65th season of competitive football in Norway.

== Men's football ==
=== League season ===
==== Promotion and relegation ====
League	Promoted to league	Relegated from league
1. divisjon	Pors; Hamarkameratene	Start; Lyn
2. divisjon	Odd; Drafn; Ulf; Steinkjer	Stag; Vigør; Ørn; Falken

==== 1. divisjon ====
Strømsgodset won the 1. division championship for the first time in 1970.

Pos	Team	Pld	W	D	L	GF	GA	GD	Pts	Qualification or relegation
1	Strømsgodset (C)	18	11	3	4	36	21	+15	25	Qualification for the European Cup first round
2	Rosenborg	18	10	4	4	15	5	+10	24	Qualification for the UEFA Cup first round
3	HamKam	18	10	3	5	31	15	+16	23	
4	Brann	18	9	5	4	18	11	+7	23	
5	Sarpsborg FK	18	9	3	6	21	21	0	21	
6	Viking	18	8	3	7	27	20	+7	19	
7	Fredrikstad	18	5	6	7	16	21	−5	16	
8	Hødd	18	4	3	11	20	27	−7	11	
9	Skeid (R)	18	4	3	11	16	23	−7	11	Relegation to Second Division
10	Pors (R)	18	3	1	14	10	46	−36	7	Relegation to Second Division

Source: NIFS
Rules for classification: 1) points; 2) goal difference; 3) number of goals scored.
(C) Champions; (R) Relegated

==== 2. divisjon ====
===== Group A =====
Pos	Team	Pld	W	D	L	GF	GA	GD	Pts	Promotion, qualification or relegation
1	Frigg (C, P)	14	7	5	2	15	14	+1	19	Promotion to First Division
2	Odd	14	6	6	2	19	14	+5	18	
3	Stabæk	14	5	4	5	17	13	+4	14	
4	Mjøndalen	14	6	2	6	24	22	+2	14	
5	Ulf	14	4	6	4	21	21	0	14	
6	Start	14	4	4	6	15	16	−1	12	
7	Bryne (R)	14	3	6	5	10	13	−3	12	Relegation to Third Division
8	Haugar (R)	14	3	3	8	10	18	−8	9	Relegation to Third Division

Source: rsssf.no
Rules for classification: 1) points; 2) goal difference; 3) number of goals scored.
(C) Champions; (P) Promoted; (R) Relegated

===== Group B =====
Pos	Team	Pld	W	D	L	GF	GA	GD	Pts	Promotion, qualification or relegation
1	Lyn (C, P)	14	11	2	1	33	7	+26	24	Promotion to First Division
2	Steinkjer	14	6	4	4	27	19	+8	16	
3	Aalesund	14	5	6	3	17	11	+6	16	
4	Raufoss	14	5	4	5	25	27	−2	14	
5	Aurskog	14	5	2	7	13	29	−16	12	
6	Drafn	14	3	5	6	25	26	−1	11	
7	Eik (R)	14	2	6	6	15	27	−12	10	Relegation to Third Division
8	Vålerengen (R)	14	2	5	7	17	26	−9	9	Relegation to Third Division

Source: rsssf.no
Rules for classification: 1) points; 2) goal difference; 3) number of goals scored.
(C) Champions; (P) Promoted; (R) Relegated

===== District IX–X =====
Pos	Team	Pld	W	D	L	GF	GA	GD	Pts	Relegation
1	Mjølner (C)	14	9	2	3	36	9	+27	20	
2	Bodø/Glimt	14	7	3	4	40	14	+26	17	
3	Stålkameratene	14	7	2	5	28	27	+1	16	
4	Mo	14	6	3	5	20	19	+1	15	
5	Harstad	14	7	1	6	23	28	−5	15	
6	Svolvær	14	6	3	5	19	24	−5	15	
7	Lyngen (R)	14	3	2	9	19	37	−18	8	Relegation to Third Division
8	Narvik/Nor (R)	14	2	2	10	7	34	−27	6	Relegation to Third Division

Source: rsssf.no
Rules for classification: 1) points; 2) goal difference; 3) number of goals scored.
(C) Champions; (R) Relegated

===== District XI =====
Pos	Team	Pld	W	D	L	GF	GA	GD	Pts	Relegation
1	Stein (C)	10	7	0	3	27	9	+18	14	
2	Kirkenes	10	6	1	3	20	13	+7	13	
3	Alta	10	5	2	3	16	13	+3	12	
4	Polarstjernen	10	3	2	5	15	17	−2	8	
5	Norild	10	3	1	6	11	24	−13	7	
6	Honningsvåg (R)	10	3	0	7	12	25	−13	6	Relegation to Third Division

Source: rsssf.no
Rules for classification: 1) points; 2) goal difference; 3) number of goals scored.
(C) Champions; (R) Relegated

=== Norwegian Cup ===
Strømsgodset won the Norwegian Cup for a second consecutive year.

==== Final ====
25 October 1970

Strømsgodset	4–2	Lyn
Presberg 30' (pen.), 46'; I. Pettersen 67', 69'	Report	Christophersen 10', 37'

Ullevaal Stadion, Oslo
Attendance: 25,744
Referee: Einar Røed (Tønsbergs TF)

== UEFA competitions ==
=== European Cup ===
==== First round ====
Team 1	Agg.	Team 2	1st leg	2nd leg
Rosenborg (Norway)	0–7	(Belgium) Standard Liège	0–2	0–5

=== European Cup Winners' Cup ===
==== First round ====
Team 1	Agg.	Team 2	1st leg	2nd leg
Strømsgodset (Norway)	3–7	(France) Nantes	0–5	3–2

== Non-UEFA competitions ==
=== Inter-Cities Fairs Cup ===
==== First round ====
Team 1	Agg.	Team 2	1st leg	2nd leg
Sarpsborg FK (Norway)	0–6	(England) Leeds United	0–1	0–5
