= 1971 in Norwegian football =

Football in Norway
- Season: 1971

Men's football
- 1. divisjon: Rosenborg
- 2. divisjon: Mjøndalen (Group A); Skeid (Group B)
- Cupen: Rosenborg

The 1971 season was the 66th season of competitive football in Norway.

== Men's football ==
=== League season ===
==== Promotion and relegation ====
League	Promoted to league	Relegated from league
1. divisjon	Frigg; Lyn	Skeid; Pors
2. divisjon	Østsiden; Vard; Molde; Eidsvold Turn	Bryne; Haugar; Eik; Vålerengen

==== 1. divisjon ====
Pos	Team	Pld	W	D	L	GF	GA	GD	Pts	Qualification or relegation
1	Rosenborg (C)	18	9	6	3	25	11	+14	24	Qualification for the European Cup first round
2	Lyn	18	9	5	4	28	17	+11	23	Qualification for the UEFA Cup first round
3	Viking	18	9	4	5	41	20	+21	22	Qualification for the UEFA Cup first round
4	Fredrikstad	18	8	6	4	32	23	+9	22	Qualification for the Cup Winners' Cup first round
5	Strømsgodset	18	7	7	4	28	21	+7	21	
6	HamKam	18	7	7	4	19	15	+4	21	
7	Sarpsborg FK	18	6	4	8	32	27	+5	16	
8	Hødd	18	3	5	10	17	32	−15	11	
9	Brann	18	3	5	10	16	31	−15	11	
10	Frigg (R)	18	4	1	13	16	55	−39	9	Relegation to Second Division

Source: NIFS
Rules for classification: 1) points; 2) goal difference; 3) number of goals scored.
(C) Champions; (R) Relegated

==== 2. divisjon ====
===== Group A =====
Pos	Team	Pld	W	D	L	GF	GA	GD	Pts	Promotion, qualification or relegation
1	Mjøndalen (C, P)	14	8	4	2	25	10	+15	20	Promotion to First Division
2	Start	14	7	5	2	23	12	+11	19	
3	Østsiden	14	7	2	5	23	14	+9	16	
4	Vard	14	5	6	3	20	20	0	16	
5	Ulf	14	4	4	6	13	18	−5	12	
6	Pors	14	4	3	7	15	23	−8	11	
7	Odd (O)	14	3	3	8	11	21	−10	9	Qualification for the relegation play-offs
8	Drafn (R)	14	3	3	8	11	23	−12	9	Relegation to Third Division

Source: rsssf.no
Rules for classification: 1) points; 2) goal difference; 3) number of goals scored.
(C) Champions; (O) Play-off winners; (P) Promoted; (R) Relegated

===== Group B =====
Pos	Team	Pld	W	D	L	GF	GA	GD	Pts	Promotion, qualification or relegation
1	Skeid (C, P)	14	10	2	2	26	7	+19	22	Promotion to First Division
2	Steinkjer	14	7	2	5	17	16	+1	16	
3	Aalesund	14	6	3	5	15	12	+3	15	
4	Stabæk	14	5	4	5	15	20	−5	14	
5	Raufoss	14	6	1	7	21	20	+1	13	
6	Molde	14	4	3	7	16	19	−3	11	
7	Aurskog (R)	14	3	5	6	7	16	−9	11	Qualification for the relegation play-offs
8	Eidsvold Turn (R)	14	2	6	6	7	14	−7	10	Relegation to Third Division

Source: rsssf.no
Rules for classification: 1) points; 2) goal difference; 3) number of goals scored.
(C) Champions; (P) Promoted; (R) Relegated

===== District IX–X =====
Pos	Team	Pld	W	D	L	GF	GA	GD	Pts	Promotion or relegation
1	Mjølner (C, P)	14	9	3	2	35	10	+25	21	Promotion to First Division
2	Mo	14	8	4	2	18	8	+10	20	
3	Tromsø	14	7	5	2	29	21	+8	19	
4	Stålkameratene	14	5	5	4	15	18	−3	15	
5	Bodø/Glimt	14	5	2	7	10	19	−9	12	
6	Mosjøen	14	5	0	9	17	22	−5	10	
7	Harstad	14	3	4	7	14	21	−7	10	
8	Svolvær (R)	14	2	1	11	9	28	−19	5	Relegation to Third Division

Source: rsssf.no
Rules for classification: 1) points; 2) goal difference; 3) number of goals scored.
(C) Champions; (P) Promoted; (R) Relegated

===== District XI =====
Pos	Team	Pld	W	D	L	GF	GA	GD	Pts	Relegation
1	Kirkenes (C)	8	5	2	1	20	9	+11	12	
2	Stein	8	5	2	1	19	9	+10	12	
3	Polarstjernen	8	2	4	2	7	9	−2	8	
4	Norild	8	1	3	4	8	16	−8	5	
5	Vadsø Turn	8	1	1	6	6	17	−11	3	
6	Alta (R)	0	0	0	0	0	0	0	0	Relegation to Third Division (Note: Alta was disqualified and all results involving Alta did not count.)

Source: rsssf.no
Rules for classification: 1) points; 2) goal difference; 3) number of goals scored.
(C) Champions; (R) Relegated

=== Norwegian Cup ===
==== Final ====
24 October 1971
13:15 CET (UTC+1)

Rosenborg	4–1	Fredrikstad
Christiansen 14'; Hanssen 57'; Wirkola 61'; Mørkved 85'	Report	Johansen 80' (pen.)

Ullevaal Stadion, Oslo
Attendance: 25,180
Referee: Rolf Nyhus (Nordstrand)

== UEFA competitions ==
=== European Cup ===
==== First round ====
Team 1	Agg.	Team 2	1st leg	2nd leg
Strømsgodset (Norway)	1–7	(England) Arsenal	1–3	0–4

=== European Cup Winners' Cup ===
==== First round ====
Team 1	Agg.	Team 2	1st leg	2nd leg
Sporting (Portugal)	7–0	(Norway) Lyn	4–0	3–0

=== UEFA Cup ===
==== First round ====
Team 1	Agg.	Team 2	1st leg	2nd leg
Rosenborg (Norway)	4–0	(Finland) HIFK	3–0 (Report)	1–0 (Report)

==== Second round ====
Team 1	Agg.	Team 2	1st leg	2nd leg
Rosenborg (Norway)	4–4(a)	(Belgium) Lierse	4–1 (Report)	0–3 (Report)
