= 1973 in Norwegian football =

Football in Norway
- Season: 1973

Men's football
- 1. divisjon: Viking
- 2. divisjon: Sarpsborg FK (Group A); Molde (Group B)
- Cupen: Strømsgodset

The 1973 season was the 68th season of competitive football in Norway.

== Men's football ==
=== League season ===
==== Promotion and relegation ====
League	Promoted to league	Relegated from league
1. divisjon	Start; Frigg; Raufoss	Sarpsborg; Hødd; Mjølner
2. divisjon	Larvik Turn; Eidsvold Turn; Skarbøvik; Sogndal	Ulf; Brumunddal; Verdal

==== 1. divisjon ====
Viking FK won the championship, their third league title.

Pos	Team	Pld	W	D	L	GF	GA	GD	Pts	Qualification or relegation
1	Viking (C)	22	13	6	3	30	13	+17	32	Qualification for the European Cup first round
2	Rosenborg	22	10	7	5	32	18	+14	27	Qualification for the UEFA Cup first round
3	Start	22	10	6	6	28	22	+6	26	Qualification for the UEFA Cup first round
4	HamKam	22	9	7	6	29	25	+4	25	
5	Brann	22	9	5	8	31	27	+4	23	
6	Strømsgodset	22	9	4	9	30	27	+3	22	Qualification for the Cup Winners' Cup first round
7	Skeid	22	8	6	8	20	21	−1	22	
8	Raufoss	22	7	7	8	21	26	−5	21	
9	Mjøndalen	22	7	7	8	21	26	−5	21	
10	Frigg (R)	22	5	8	9	21	27	−6	18	Relegation to Second Division
11	Lyn (R)	22	5	6	11	23	31	−8	16	Relegation to Second Division
12	Fredrikstad (R)	22	3	5	14	20	43	−23	11	Relegation to Second Division

Source: NIFS
Rules for classification: 1) points; 2) goal difference; 3) number of goals scored.
(C) Champions; (R) Relegated

==== 2. divisjon ====
===== Group A =====
Pos	Team	Pld	W	D	L	GF	GA	GD	Pts	Promotion, qualification or relegation
1	Sarpsborg FK (C, P)	18	13	3	2	44	21	+23	29	Promotion to First Division
2	Vålerengen (O, P)	18	11	3	4	38	20	+18	25	Qualification for the promotion play-offs
3	Odd	18	9	3	6	27	21	+6	21	
4	Eidsvold Turn	18	10	0	8	38	27	+11	20	
5	Moss	18	7	5	6	23	19	+4	19	
6	Østsiden	18	8	2	8	18	26	−8	18	
7	Larvik Turn	18	5	7	6	20	20	0	17	
8	Pors	18	5	5	8	28	35	−7	15	
9	Stabæk (R)	18	3	3	12	16	36	−20	9	Relegation to Third Division
10	Sandefjord BK (R)	18	3	1	14	18	45	−27	7	Relegation to Third Division

Source: rsssf.no
Rules for classification: 1) points; 2) goal difference; 3) number of goals scored.
(C) Champions; (O) Play-off winners; (P) Promoted; (R) Relegated

===== Group B =====
Pos	Team	Pld	W	D	L	GF	GA	GD	Pts	Promotion, qualification or relegation
1	Molde (C, P)	18	14	3	1	58	19	+39	31	Promotion to First Division
2	Bryne	18	11	3	4	24	12	+12	25	Qualification for the promotion play-offs
3	Aalesund	18	6	9	3	16	12	+4	21	
4	Vard	18	6	8	4	29	26	+3	20	
5	Clausenengen	18	6	5	7	16	21	−5	17	
6	Hødd	18	6	4	8	32	34	−2	16	
7	Florvåg	18	5	6	7	32	38	−6	16	
8	Steinkjer	18	2	9	7	12	29	−17	13	
9	Skarbøvik (R)	18	4	4	10	30	36	−6	12	Relegation to Third Division
10	Sogndal (R)	18	2	5	11	15	37	−22	9	Relegation to Third Division

Source: rsssf.no
Rules for classification: 1) points; 2) goal difference; 3) number of goals scored.
(C) Champions; (P) Promoted; (R) Relegated

===== District IX–X =====
Pos	Team	Pld	W	D	L	GF	GA	GD	Pts	Qualification or relegation
1	Mjølner (C)	14	7	4	3	28	13	+15	18	Qualification for the promotion play-offs
2	Mo	14	7	4	3	21	15	+6	18	
3	Bodø/Glimt	14	8	1	5	34	16	+18	17	
4	Grand Bodø	14	6	5	3	26	22	+4	17	
5	Harstad	14	4	6	4	21	19	+2	14	
6	Andenes	14	5	4	5	12	18	−6	14	
7	Stålkameratene (R)	14	5	2	7	13	17	−4	12	Relegation to Third Division
8	Mosjøen (R)	14	0	2	12	9	44	−35	2	Relegation to Third Division

Source: rsssf.no
Rules for classification: 1) points; 2) goal difference; 3) number of goals scored.
(C) Champions; (R) Relegated

===== District XI =====
Pos	Team	Pld	W	D	L	GF	GA	GD	Pts	Relegation
1	Kirkenes (C)	14	11	2	1	33	9	+24	24	
2	Norild	14	8	4	2	36	10	+26	20	
3	Honningsvåg	14	7	1	6	29	25	+4	15	
4	Sørild	14	5	4	5	22	22	0	14	
5	Stein	14	5	3	6	22	24	−2	13	
6	Polarstjernen	14	6	1	7	20	28	−8	13	
7	Vadsø Turn (R)	14	3	3	8	13	25	−12	9	Relegation to Third Division
8	Rafsbotn (R)	14	1	2	11	6	38	−32	4	Relegation to Third Division

Source: rsssf.no
Rules for classification: 1) points; 2) goal difference; 3) number of goals scored.
(C) Champions; (R) Relegated

=== Norwegian Cup ===
==== Final ====
21 October 1973
13:15 CET (UTC+1)

Strømsgodset	1–0	Rosenborg
S. Pettersen 78'	Report

Ullevaal Stadion, Oslo
Attendance: 23,209
Referee: Svein-Inge Thime (Stavanger)

== UEFA competitions ==
=== European Cup ===
==== First round ====
Team 1	Agg.	Team 2	1st leg	2nd leg
Viking (Norway)	1–3	(Czechoslovakia) Spartak Trnava	1–2	0–1

=== European Cup Winners' Cup ===
==== First round ====
Team 1	Agg.	Team 2	1st leg	2nd leg
Gżira United (Malta)	0–9	(Norway) Brann	0–2	0–7

==== Second round ====
Team 1	Agg.	Team 2	1st leg	2nd leg
Brann (Norway)	2–4	(Northern Ireland) Glentoran	1–1	1–3

=== UEFA Cup ===
==== First round ====
Team 1	Agg.	Team 2	1st leg	2nd leg
Fredrikstad (Norway)	0–5	(Soviet Union) Dynamo Kyiv	0–1	0–4
Strømsgodset (Norway)	2–7	(England) Leeds United	1–1 (Report)	1–6 (Report)

== National team ==
=== Results ===
6 June 1973 Friendly	Norway	1–1	Republic of Ireland	Oslo, Norway
CET (UTC+1)	Hans Edgar Paulsen 69'	Report	Miah Dennehy 17'	Stadium: Ullevaal Stadion; Attendance: 11,048; Referee: Martti Hirviniemi (Finland)
