= 1969 Norwegian Second Division =

2. divisjon
- Season: 1969
- Champions: Pors; Hamarkameratene
- Promoted: Pors; Hamarkameratene
- Relegated: Stag; Vigør; Ørn; Falken

The 1969 2. divisjon was a Norwegian second-tier football league season.

The league was contested by 16 teams, divided into two groups; A and B. The winners of group A and B were promoted to the 1970 1. divisjon. The two bottom teams in both groups were relegated to the 3. divisjon.

== Overview ==
=== Summary ===
Pors won group A with 22 points. Hamarkameratene won group B with 22 points. Both teams promoted to the 1970 1. divisjon.

== Tables ==
=== Group A ===
Pos	Team	Pld	W	D	L	GF	GA	GD	Pts	Promotion, qualification or relegation
1	Pors (C, P)	14	10	2	2	36	14	+22	22	Promotion to First Division
2	Vålerengen	14	9	1	4	24	13	+11	19	
3	Mjøndalen	14	5	4	5	23	17	+6	14	
4	Bryne	14	5	4	5	23	20	+3	14	
5	Haugar	14	5	3	6	21	21	0	13	
6	Eik	14	4	3	7	14	29	−15	11	
7	Stag (R)	14	5	0	9	16	35	−19	10	Relegation to Third Division
8	Vigør (R)	14	2	5	7	9	17	−8	9	Relegation to Third Division

Source: rsssf.no
Rules for classification: 1) points; 2) goal difference; 3) number of goals scored.
(C) Champions; (P) Promoted; (R) Relegated

=== Group B ===
Pos	Team	Pld	W	D	L	GF	GA	GD	Pts	Promotion, qualification or relegation
1	Hamarkameratene (C, P)	14	9	4	1	22	10	+12	22	Promotion to First Division
2	Stabæk	14	8	1	5	28	18	+10	17	
3	Aalesund	14	7	3	4	25	15	+10	17	
4	Raufoss	14	6	4	4	32	25	+7	16	
5	Aurskog	14	6	1	7	14	19	−5	13	
6	Frigg	14	4	4	6	16	18	−2	12	
7	Ørn (R)	14	5	0	9	21	33	−12	10	Relegation to Third Division
8	Falken (R)	14	1	3	10	13	33	−20	5	Relegation to Third Division

Source: rsssf.no
Rules for classification: 1) points; 2) goal difference; 3) number of goals scored.
(C) Champions; (P) Promoted; (R) Relegated
