= 1971–72 European Cup =

European football tournament

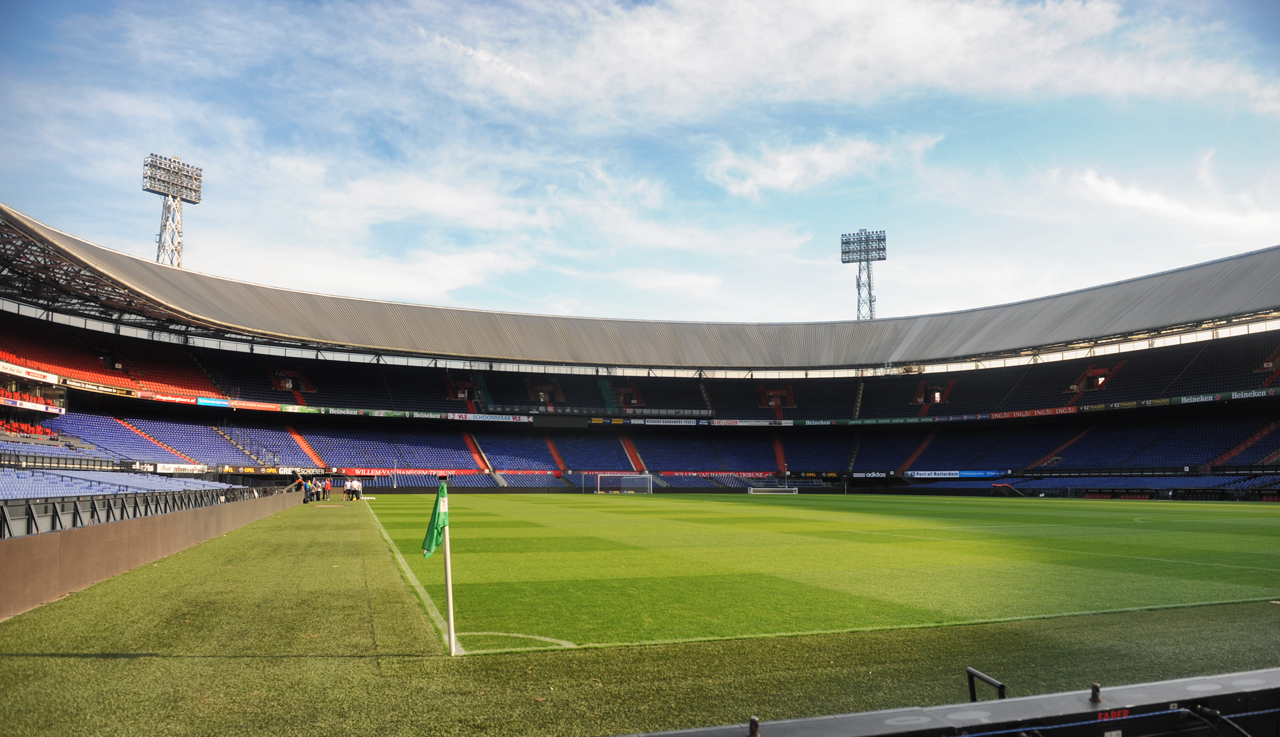
- De Kuip in Rotterdam hosted the final.

Tournament details
- Dates: 19 August 1971 – 31 May 1972
- Teams: 33 (from 32 associations)

Final positions
- Champions: (Netherlands) Ajax (2nd title)
- Runners-up: (Italy) Inter Milan

Tournament statistics
- Matches played: 63
- Goals scored: 175 (2.78 per match)
- Attendance: 2,091,421 (33,197 per match)
- Top scorer(s): Antal Dunai (Újpesti Dózsa); Johan Cruyff (Ajax); Lou Macari (Celtic); Silvester Takač (Standard Liège); 5 goals each

The 1971–72 European Cup was the 17th season of the European Cup, UEFA's premier club football tournament. The competition was won by Ajax, who beat Inter Milan in the final at De Kuip in Rotterdam, on 31 May 1972. It was the second consecutive win for Ajax, as well as third for Netherlands. It was also the first European Cup final where both finalists had previously won and lost competition finals.

== Teams ==
(Albania) Partizani Tirana (1st)	(Austria) Wacker Innsbruck (1st)	(Belgium) Standard Liège (1st)
(Bulgaria) CSKA September Flag (1st)	(Cyprus) Olympiakos Nicosia (1st)	(Czechoslovakia) Spartak Trnava (1st)
(Denmark) Boldklubben 1903 (1st)	(England) Arsenal (1st)	(Finland) Reipas Lahti (1st)
(France) Marseille (1st)	(East Germany) Dynamo Dresden (1st)	(West Germany) Borussia M.Gladbach (1st)
(Greece) AEK Athens (1st)	(Hungary) Újpesti Dózsa (1st)	(Iceland) ÍA (1st)
(Republic of Ireland) Cork Hibernians (1st)	(Italy) Inter Milan (1st)	Union Luxembourg (1st)
(Malta) Sliema Wanderers (1st)	(Netherlands) Feyenoord (1st)	(Netherlands) Ajax (2nd)^{TH}
(Northern Ireland) Linfield (1st)	(Norway) Strømsgodset (1st)	(Poland) Górnik Zabrze (1st)
(Portugal) Benfica (1st)	(Romania) Dinamo București (1st)	(Scotland) Celtic (1st)
(Spain) Valencia (1st)	(Sweden) Malmö FF (1st)	(Switzerland) Grasshopper (1st)
(Turkey) Galatasaray (1st)	(Soviet Union) CSKA Moscow (1st)	(Socialist Federal Republic of Yugoslavia) Hajduk Split (1st)

== Preliminary round ==
Team 1	Agg.	Team 2	1st leg	2nd leg
Valencia (Spain)	4–1	Union Luxembourg	3–1	1–0

=== First leg ===
19 August 1971

Valencia (Spain)	3–1	Union Luxembourg
Forment 28'; Claramunt 56' (pen.); Valdez 90'	Report	Clemen 16'

Estadio Luis Casanova, Valencia
Attendance: 10,105
Referee: Michel Kitabdjian (France)

=== Second leg ===
24 August 1971

Union Luxembourg	0–1	(Spain) Valencia
	Report	Forment 17'

Stade Achille Hammerel, Luxembourg
Attendance: 3,230
Referee: Jef Dorpmans (Netherlands)

Valencia won 4–1 on aggregate.

== Bracket ==
First round
(Spain) Valencia (a)	0	1	1
(Socialist Federal Republic of Yugoslavia) Hajduk Split	0	1	1
(Hungary) Újpesti Dózsa	4	0	4
(Sweden) Malmö FF	0	1	1
(Denmark) Boldklubben 1903	2	0	2
(Scotland) Celtic	1	3	4
(Iceland) ÍA	0	0	0
(Malta) Sliema Wanderers	4	0	4
(Italy) Inter Milan	4	2	6
(Greece) AEK Athens	1	3	4
(Republic of Ireland) Cork Hibernians	0	1	1
(West Germany) Borussia M.Gladbach	5	2	7
(Turkey) Galatasaray	1	0	1
(Soviet Union) CSKA Moscow	1	3	4
(Belgium) Standard Liège	2	3	5
(Northern Ireland) Linfield	0	2	2
(France) Marseille	2	1	3
(Poland) Górnik Zabrze	1	1	2
(Netherlands) Ajax	2	0	2
(East Germany) Dynamo Dresden	0	0	0
(Finland) Reipas Lahti	1	0	1
(Switzerland) Grasshopper	1	8	9
(Norway) Strømsgodset	1	0	1
(England) Arsenal	3	4	7
(Romania) Dinamo București (a)	0	2	2
(Czechoslovakia) Spartak Trnava	0	2	2
(Netherlands) Feyenoord	8	9	17
(Cyprus) Olympiakos Nicosia	0	0	0
(Austria) Wacker Innsbruck	0	1	1
(Portugal) Benfica	4	3	7
(Bulgaria) CSKA September Flag	3	1	4
(Albania) Partizani	0	0	0

Second round
(Spain) Valencia	0	1	1
(Hungary) Újpesti Dózsa	1	2	3
(Scotland) Celtic	5	2	7
(Malta) Sliema Wanderers	0	1	1
(Italy) Inter Milan	4	0	4
(West Germany) Borussia M.Gladbach	2	0	2
(Soviet Union) CSKA Moscow	1	0	1
(Belgium) Standard Liège	0	2	2
(France) Marseille	1	1	2
(Netherlands) Ajax	2	4	6
(Switzerland) Grasshopper	0	0	0
(England) Arsenal	2	3	5
(Romania) Dinamo București	0	0	0
(Netherlands) Feyenoord	3	2	5
(Portugal) Benfica	2	0	2
(Bulgaria) CSKA September Flag	1	0	1

Quarter-finals
(Hungary) Újpesti Dózsa	1	1	2
(Scotland) Celtic	2	1	3
(Italy) Inter Milan (a)	1	1	2
(Belgium) Standard Liège	0	2	2
(Netherlands) Ajax	2	1	3
(England) Arsenal	1	0	1
(Netherlands) Feyenoord	1	1	2
(Portugal) Benfica	0	5	5

Semi-finals
(Italy) Inter Milan (p)	0	0	0 (5)
(Scotland) Celtic	0	0	0 (4)
(Netherlands) Ajax	1	0	1
(Portugal) Benfica	0	0	0

Final
(Italy) Inter Milan	0
(Netherlands) Ajax	2

== First round ==
Team 1	Agg.	Team 2	1st leg	2nd leg
Marseille (France)	3–2	(Poland) Górnik Zabrze	2–1	1–1
Ajax (Netherlands)	2–0	(East Germany) Dynamo Dresden	2–0	0–0
Reipas Lahti (Finland)	1–9	(Switzerland) Grasshopper	1–1	0–8
Strømsgodset (Norway)	1–7	(England) Arsenal	1–3	0–4
Dinamo București (Romania)	2–2 (a)	(Czechoslovakia) Spartak Trnava	0–0	2–2
Feyenoord (Netherlands)	17–0	(Cyprus) Olympiakos Nicosia	8–0	9–0
Wacker (Austria)	1–7	(Portugal) Benfica	0–4	1–3
CSKA September Flag (Bulgaria)	4–0	(Albania) Partizani	3–0	1–0
Valencia (Spain)	1–1 (a)	(Socialist Federal Republic of Yugoslavia) Hajduk Split	0–0	1–1
Újpesti Dózsa (Hungary)	4–1	(Sweden) Malmö FF	4–0	0–1
Boldklubben 1903 (Denmark)	2–4	(Scotland) Celtic	2–1	0–3
ÍA (Iceland)	0–4	(Malta) Sliema Wanderers	0–4	0–0
Inter Milan (Italy)	6–4	(Greece) AEK Athens	4–1	2–3
Cork Hibernians (Republic of Ireland)	1–7	(West Germany) Borussia Mönchengladbach	0–5	1–2
Galatasaray (Turkey)	1–4	(Soviet Union) CSKA Moscow	1–1	0–3
Standard Liège (Belgium)	5–2	(Northern Ireland) Linfield	2–0	3–2

=== First leg ===
15 September 1971

Marseille (France)	2–1	(Poland) Górnik Zabrze
Wraży 45' (o.g.); Skoblar 78'	Report	Lubański 28'

Stade Vélodrome, Marseille
Attendance: 41,707
Referee: Santos Fernando Leite (Portugal)

15 September 1971

Ajax (Netherlands)	2–0	(East Germany) Dynamo Dresden
Swart 2'; Keizer 19'	Report

Olympisch Stadion, Amsterdam
Attendance: 45,027
Referee: Milivoje Gugulović (Yugoslavia)

15 September 1971

Reipas Lahti (Finland)	1–1	(Switzerland) Grasshopper
Lindholm 75'	Report	Ohlhauser 63'

Lahden kisapuisto, Lahti
Attendance: 1,276
Referee: Einar Boström (Sweden)

15 September 1971

Strømsgodset (Norway)	1–3	(England) Arsenal
Pettersen 52'	Report	Simpson 2'; Wølner 20' (o.g.); Kelly 81'

Ullevaal Stadion, Oslo
Attendance: 21,570
Referee: Georg Krutelew (Finland)

15 September 1971

Dinamo București (Romania)	0–0	(Czechoslovakia) Spartak Trnava
	Report

Stadionul 23 August, Bucharest
Attendance: 13,200
Referee: Paul Schiller (Finland)

15 September 1971

Feyenoord (Netherlands)	8–0	(Cyprus) Olympiakos Nicosia
Maiwald 4', 32'; Van Hanegem 9'; Schoenmaker 25', 47', 49'; Israël 82'; Schneider 88'	Report

Stadion Feijenoord, Rotterdam
Attendance: 51,633
Referee: Kaj Bernhard Rasmussen (Denmark)

15 September 1971

Wacker (Austria)	0–4	(Portugal) Benfica
	Report	Graça 15'; Artur Jorge 20', 82'; Eusébio 80'

Tivoli, Innsbruck
Attendance: 7,956
Referee: Liuben Radunchev (Bulgaria)

15 September 1971

CSKA September Flag (Bulgaria)	3–0	(Albania) Partizani
Atanasov 20'; Nikodimov 44' (pen.); Marashliev 65'	Report

Armiyata, Sofia
Attendance: 15,670
Referee: Ertuğrul Dilek (Turkey)

15 September 1971

Valencia (Spain)	0–0	(Socialist Federal Republic of Yugoslavia) Hajduk Split
	Report

Estadio Luis Casanova, Valencia
Attendance: 8,045
Referee: John Carpenter (Republic of Ireland)

15 September 1971

Újpesti Dózsa (Hungary)	4–0	(Sweden) Malmö FF
A. Dunai 17'; Bene 28', 64', 80'	Report

Megyeri úti Stadion, Budapest
Attendance: 7,833
Referee: Tahir Kalaci (Albania)

15 September 1971

Boldklubben 1903 (Denmark)	2–1	(Scotland) Celtic
Johansen 14', 24'	Report	Macari 28'

Parken, Copenhague
Attendance: 6,600
Referee: Egil Bergstad (Norway)

26 September 1971

ÍA (Iceland)	0–4	(Malta) Sliema Wanderers
	Report	Cocks 25', 57', 68'; Aquilina 81'

Empire Stadium, Gżira, Gżira
Attendance: 3,516
Referee: John Gow (Wales)

15 September 1971

Inter Milan (Italy)	4–1	(Greece) AEK Athens
Mazzola 20'; Facchetti 35'; Jair 44'; Boninsegna 61' (pen.)	Report	Pomonis 15'

San Siro, Milan
Attendance: 72,333
Referee: Vital Loraux (Belgium)

15 September 1971

Cork Hibernians (Republic of Ireland)	0–5	(West Germany) Borussia Mönchengladbach
	Report	Wloka 5', 30'; Heynckes 19'; Le Fevre 32', 39'

Flower Lodge, Cork
Attendance: 8,513
Referee: Robert Schaut (Belgium)

15 September 1971

Galatasaray (Turkey)	1–1	(Soviet Union) CSKA Moscow
Güleş 71'	Report	Kopeikin 43'

Mithat Paşa Stadyumu, Istanbul
Attendance: 24,789
Referee: Victor Pădureanu (Romania)

15 September 1971

Standard Liège (Belgium)	2–0	(Northern Ireland) Linfield
Semmeling 33'; Takač 87'	Report

Sclessin, Liège
Attendance: 8,755
Referee: Rudolf Scheurer (Switzerland)

=== Second leg ===
29 September 1971

Górnik Zabrze (Poland)	1–1	(France) Marseille
Anczok 32'	Report	Skoblar 53'

Stadion Śląski, Chorzów
Attendance: 48,617
Referee: Gaspar Pintado Viu (Spain)

Marseille won 3–2 on aggregate.

29 September 1971

Dynamo Dresden (East Germany)	0–0	(Netherlands) Ajax
	Report

Rudolf-Harbig-Stadion, Dresden
Attendance: 32,307
Referee: Ken Burns (England)

Ajax won 2–0 on aggregate.

29 September 1971

Grasshopper (Switzerland)	8–0	(Finland) Reipas Lahti
Müller 1', 39', 71', 85'; Gröbli 31'; Schneeberger 45'; Meier 70'; Mayer 77'	Report

Hardturm, Zürich
Attendance: 4,941
Referee: Franz Wöhrer (Austria)

Grasshopper won 9–1 on aggregate.

29 September 1971

Arsenal (England)	4–0	(Norway) Strømsgodset
Kennedy 6'; Radford 18', 58'; Armstrong 78'	Report

Highbury, London
Attendance: 27,176
Referee: Savar Sigurdsson (Iceland)

Arsenal won 7–1 on aggregate.

29 September 1971

Spartak Trnava (Czechoslovakia)	2–2	(Romania) Dinamo București
Kabát 42'; Dobiaš 69' (pen.)	Report	Popescu 63', 88'

Stadion Trnava, Trnava
Attendance: 23,000
Referee: Hans-Joachim Weyland (West Germany)

2–2 on aggregate; Dinamo București won on away goals.

22 September 1971

Olympiakos Nicosia (Cyprus)	0–9	(Netherlands) Feyenoord
	Report	Van Hanegem 6', 82'; Hasil 11'; Wery 20'; Posthumus 31', 39'; Israël 61' (pen.), 63' (pen.), 70'

Stadion Feijenoord, Rotterdam
Attendance: 33,413
Referee: Josip Horvat (Yugoslavia)

Feyenoord won 17–0 on aggregate.

29 September 1971

Benfica (Portugal)	3–1	(Austria) Wacker
Calisto 36'; Artur Jorge 74'; Simões 89'	Report	Jara 46'

Estádio de Luz, Lisbon
Attendance: 37,809
Referee: Malcolm Wright (Northern Ireland)

Benfica won 7–1 on aggregate.

29 September 1971

Partizani (Albania)	0–1	(Bulgaria) CSKA September Flag
	Report	Atanasov 57'

Stadiumi Kombëtar Qemal Stafa, Tirana
Attendance: 18,018
Referee: Gyula Emsberger (Hungary)

CSKA September Flag won 4–0 on aggregate.

29 September 1971

Hajduk Split (Socialist Federal Republic of Yugoslavia)	1–1	(Spain) Valencia
Pérez 15' (o.g.)	Report	Claramunt 55'

Stadion Stari plac, Split
Attendance: 14,761
Referee: Kurt Tschenscher (West Germany)

1–1 on aggregate; Valencia won on away goals.

29 September 1971

Malmö FF (Sweden)	1–0	(Hungary) Újpesti Dózsa
Tapper 11' (pen.)	Report

Malmö Stadion, Malmö
Attendance: 8,233
Referee: Brunon Piotrowicz (Poland)

Újpesti Dózsa won 4–1 on aggregate.

29 September 1971

Celtic (Scotland)	3–0	(Denmark) Boldklubben 1903
Wallace 23', 85'; Callaghan 79'	Report

Celtic Park, Glasgow
Attendance: 53,000
Referee: Robert Héliès (France)

Celtic won 4–2 on aggregate.

29 September 1971

Sliema Wanderers (Malta)	0–0	(Iceland) ÍA
	Report

Empire Stadium, Gżira
Attendance: 1,487
Referee: Tom Reynolds (Wales)

Sliema Wanderers won 4–0 on aggregate.

29 September 1971

AEK Athens (Greece)	3–2	(Italy) Inter Milan
Ventouris 29'; Papaioannou 45'; Nikolaidis 89'	Report	Karafeskos 17' (o.g.); Boninsegna 75'

AEK Stadium, Athens
Attendance: 29,449
Referee: Tofiq Bahramov (Soviet Union)

Inter Milan won 6–4 on aggregate.

29 September 1971

Borussia Mönchengladbach (West Germany)	2–1	(Republic of Ireland) Cork Hibernians
Sieloff 60'; Wimmer 82'	Report	Dennehy 32'

Bökelbergstadion, Mönchengladbach
Attendance: 9,098
Referee: Josef Krnavek (Czechoslovakia)

Borussia Mönchengladbach won 7–1 on aggregate.

29 September 1971

CSKA Moscow (Soviet Union)	3–0	(Turkey) Galatasaray
Dorofeev 6', 75'; Oglobin 85'	Report

Central Stadium Vladimir Lenin, Moscow
Attendance: 30,000
Referee: Reino Koskinen (Finland)

CSKA Moscow won 4–1 on aggregate.

29 September 1971

Linfield (Northern Ireland)	2–3	(Belgium) Standard Liège
Magee 57'; Larmour 62'	Report	Van Moer 36'; Takač 53'; Piot 86' (pen.)

Windsor Park, Belfast
Attendance: 5,500
Referee: Charles Corver (Netherlands)

Standard Liège won 5–2 on aggregate.

== Second round ==
Team 1	Agg.	Team 2	1st leg	2nd leg
Marseille (France)	2–6	(Netherlands) Ajax	1–2	1–4
Grasshopper (Switzerland)	0–5	(England) Arsenal	0–2	0–3
Dinamo București (Romania)	0–5	(Netherlands) Feyenoord	0–3	0–2
Benfica (Portugal)	2–1	(Bulgaria) CSKA September Flag	2–1	0–0
Valencia (Spain)	1–3	(Hungary) Újpesti Dózsa	0–1	1–2
Celtic (Scotland)	7–1	(Malta) Sliema Wanderers	5–0	2–1
Inter Milan (Italy)	4–2	(West Germany) Borussia Mönchengladbach	4–2	0–0
CSKA Moscow (Soviet Union)	1–2	(Belgium) Standard Liège	1–0	0–2

=== First leg ===
20 October 1971

Marseille (France)	1–2	(Netherlands) Ajax
Gress 10'	Report	Keizer 37'; Cruyff 60'

Stade Vélodrome, Marseille
Attendance: 48,039
Referee: Robert Schaut (Belgium)

20 October 1971

Grasshopper (Switzerland)	0–2	(England) Arsenal
	Report	Kennedy 2'; Graham 88'

Hardturm, Zürich
Attendance: 14,964
Referee: Michel Kitabdjian (France)

20 October 1971

Dinamo București (Romania)	0–3	(Netherlands) Feyenoord
	Report	Wery 38'; Maiwald 43'; Schneider 50'

Stadionul 23 August, Bucharest
Attendance: 35,000
Referee: Doğan Babacan (Turkey)

20 October 1971

Benfica (Portugal)	2–1	(Bulgaria) CSKA September Flag
Rodrigues 51'; Artur Jorge 63'	Report	Zhekov 85'

Estádio da Luz, Lisbon
Attendance: 39,944
Referee: Aurelio Angonese (Italy)

20 October 1971

Valencia (Spain)	0–1	(Hungary) Újpesti Dózsa
	Report	A. Dunai 55'

Estadio Luis Casanova, Valencia
Attendance: 47,695
Referee: Clive Thomas (Wales)

20 October 1971

Celtic (Scotland)	5–0	(Malta) Sliema Wanderers
Gemmell 6'; Macari 17', 41'; Hood 69'; Brogan 78'	Report

Celtic Park, Glasgow
Attendance: 26,647
Referee: Einar Hjartarsson (Iceland)

20 October 1971

Borussia Mönchengladbach (West Germany)	7–1	(Italy) Inter Milan
Heynckes 7', 44'; Le Fevre 21', 34'; Netzer 42', 52'; Sieloff 83' (pen.)		Boninsegna 20'

Bökelbergstadion, Mönchengladbach
Attendance: 27,500
Referee: Jef Dorpmans (Netherlands)

This game was annulled as Inter player Roberto Boninsegna was hit by a Coca-Cola can in the 29th minute. The first leg game was replayed after the game that was originally scheduled to be the second leg was played, thus the order of legs was switched.

3 November 1971

Inter Milan (Italy)	4–2	(West Germany) Borussia Mönchengladbach
Bellugi 10'; Boninsegna 13'; Jair 57'; Ghio 90'	Report	Le Fevre 38'; Wittkamp 89'

San Siro, Milan
Attendance: 57,413
Referee: Rudolf Scheurer (Switzerland)

20 October 1971

CSKA Moscow (Soviet Union)	1–0	(Belgium) Standard Liège
Kopeikin 27'	Report

Central Stadium Vladimir Lenin, Moscow
Attendance: 18,000
Referee: Erich Linemayr (Austria)

=== Second leg ===
3 November 1971

Ajax (Netherlands)	4–1	(France) Marseille
Cruyff 32', 64'; Swart 37'; Haan 80'	Report	Couécou 17'

Olympisch Stadion, Amsterdam
Attendance: 53,785
Referee: Alastair MacKenzie (Scotland)

Ajax won 6–2 on aggregate.

3 November 1971

Arsenal (England)	3–0	(Switzerland) Grasshopper
Kennedy 40'; George 47'; Radford 84'	Report

Highbury, London
Attendance: 31,106
Referee: Ove Dahlberg (Sweden)

Arsenal won 5–0 on aggregate.

3 November 1971

Feyenoord (Netherlands)	2–0	(Romania) Dinamo București
Nunweiller 53' (o.g.); Schoenmaker 64'	Report

De Kuip, Rotterdam
Attendance: 60,000
Referee: Norman Burtenshaw (England)

Feyenoord won 5–0 on aggregate.

3 November 1971

CSKA September Flag (Bulgaria)	0–0	(Portugal) Benfica
	Report

Natsionalen Stadion Vasil Levski, Sofia
Attendance: 30,323
Referee: Leonidas Vasilikopoulos (Greece)

Benfica won 2–1 on aggregate.

3 November 1971

Újpesti Dózsa (Hungary)	2–1	(Spain) Valencia
A. Dunai 51', 54'	Report	Valdez 57'

Megyeri úti Stadion, Budapest
Attendance: 7,201
Referee: Milivoje Gugulović (Yugoslavia)

Újpesti Dózsa won 3–1 on aggregate.

3 November 1971

Sliema Wanderers (Malta)	1–2	(Scotland) Celtic
Cocks 1'	Report	Hood 42'; Lennox 57'

Empire Stadium, Gżira
Attendance: 10,416
Referee: Andreas Kouniaides (Cyprus)

Celtic won 7–1 on aggregate.

1 December 1971

Borussia Mönchengladbach (West Germany)	0–0	(Italy) Inter Milan
	Report

Olympiastadion, West Berlin
Attendance: 84,561
Referee: Jack Taylor (England)

Inter Milan won 4–2 on aggregate.

3 November 1971

Standard Liège (Belgium)	2–0	(Soviet Union) CSKA Moscow
Takač 7', 60' (pen.)	Report

Sclessin, Liège
Attendance: 38,000
Referee: Gerhard Schulenburg (West Germany)

Standard Liège won 2–1 on aggregate.

== Quarter-finals ==
Team 1	Agg.	Team 2	1st leg	2nd leg
Ajax (Netherlands)	3–1	(England) Arsenal	2–1	1–0
Feyenoord (Netherlands)	2–5	(Portugal) Benfica	1–0	1–5
Újpesti Dózsa (Hungary)	2–3	(Scotland) Celtic	1–2	1–1
Inter Milan (Italy)	2–2 (a)	(Belgium) Standard Liège	1–0	1–2

=== First leg ===
8 March 1972

Ajax (Netherlands)	2–1	(England) Arsenal
G. Mühren 25', 70' (pen.)	Report	Kennedy 15'

Olympisch Stadion, Amsterdam
Attendance: 53,754
Referee: Léonidas Vasilikopoulos (Greece)

8 March 1972

Feyenoord (Netherlands)	1–0	(Portugal) Benfica
Laseroms 50'	Report

De Kuip, Rotterdam
Attendance: 58,927
Referee: Gerhard Kunze (East Germany)

8 March 1972

Újpesti Dózsa (Hungary)	1–2	(Scotland) Celtic
Horváth 64'	Report	Horváth 19' (o.g.); Macari 85'

Megyeri úti Stadion, Budapest
Attendance: 25,064
Referee: Hans-Joachim Weyland (West Germany)

8 March 1972

Inter Milan (Italy)	1–0	(Belgium) Standard Liège
Jair 80'	Report

San Siro, Milan
Attendance: 54,024
Referee: Milivoje Gugulović (Yugoslavia)

=== Second leg ===
22 March 1972

Arsenal (England)	0–1	(Netherlands) Ajax
	Report	Graham 14' (o.g.)

Highbury, London
Attendance: 56,145
Referee: Ferdinand Marschall (Austria)

Ajax won 3–1 on aggregate.

22 March 1972

Benfica (Portugal)	5–1	(Netherlands) Feyenoord
Nené 6', 81', 90+2'; Jordão 30', 90'	Report	Van Hanegem 75'

Estádio da Luz, Lisbon
Attendance: 69,021
Referee: Clive Thomas (Wales)

Benfica won 5–2 on aggregate.

22 March 1972

Celtic (Scotland)	1–1	(Hungary) Újpesti Dózsa
Macari 62'	Report	A. Dunai 5'

Celtic Park, Glasgow
Attendance: 70,559
Referee: Robert Schaut (Belgium)

Celtic won 3–2 on aggregate.

22 March 1972

Standard Liège (Belgium)	2–1	(Italy) Inter Milan
Cvetler 51'; Takač 84' (pen.)	Report	Mazzola 80'

Sclessin, Liège
Attendance: 26,993
Referee: Gyula Emsberger (Hungary)

2–2 on aggregate; Inter Milan won on away goals.

== Semi-finals ==
Team 1	Agg.	Team 2	1st leg	2nd leg
Ajax (Netherlands)	1–0	(Portugal) Benfica	1–0	0–0
Inter Milan (Italy)	0–0 (5–4 p)	(Scotland) Celtic	0–0	0–0

=== First leg ===
5 April 1972

Ajax (Netherlands)	1–0	(Portugal) Benfica
Swart 64'	Report

Olympisch Stadion, Amsterdam
Attendance: 53,921
Referee: Karlo Kruasvili (Soviet Union)

5 April 1972

Inter Milan (Italy)	0–0	(Scotland) Celtic
	Report

San Siro, Milan
Attendance: 69,836
Referee: Erich Linemayr (Austria)

=== Second leg ===
19 April 1972

Benfica (Portugal)	0–0	(Netherlands) Ajax
	Report

Estádio da Luz, Lisbon
Attendance: 58,938
Referee: Norman Burtenshaw (England)

Ajax won 1–0 on aggregate.

19 April 1972

Celtic (Scotland)	0–0 (a.e.t.)	(Italy) Inter Milan
	Report
Penalties
Deans (penalty missed); Craig (penalty scored); Johnstone (penalty scored); McCluskey (penalty scored); Murdoch (penalty scored)	4–5	(penalty scored) Mazzola; (penalty scored) Facchetti; (penalty scored) Frustalupi; (penalty scored) Pellizzaro; (penalty scored) Jair

Celtic Park, Glasgow
Attendance: 75,124
Referee: Rudi Glöckner (East Germany)

0–0 on aggregate; Inter Milan won 5–4 on penalties.

During the shoot-out, teams had to take all five penalties even if they could no longer win (the shoot-out would otherwise have ended with a score of 5–3 as Inter went first).

== Final ==
31 May 1972

Inter Milan (Italy)	0–2	(Netherlands) Ajax
	Report	Cruyff 47', 78'

De Kuip, Rotterdam
Attendance: 61,354
Referee: Robert Héliès (France)

== Top scorers ==
Rank	Name	Team	Goals
1	(Netherlands) Johan Cruyff	(Netherlands) Ajax	5
1	(Hungary) Antal Dunai	(Hungary) Újpesti Dózsa	5
1	(Scotland) Lou Macari	(Scotland) Celtic	5
1	(Socialist Federal Republic of Yugoslavia) Silvester Takač	(Belgium) Standard Liège	5
5	(Malta) Ronnie Cocks	(Malta) Sliema Wanderers	4
5	(Netherlands) Willem van Hanegem	(Netherlands) Feyenoord	4
5	(Netherlands) Rinus Israël	(Netherlands) Feyenoord	4
5	(Portugal) Artur Jorge	(Portugal) Benfica	4
5	(England) Ray Kennedy	(England) Arsenal	4
5	(Switzerland) Kurt Müller	(Switzerland) Grasshopper	4
5	(Netherlands) Lex Schoenmaker	(Netherlands) Feyenoord	4
