= 1971 Norwegian Second Division =

Norwegian second-tier football league season

2. divisjon
- Season: 1971
- Champions: Mjøndalen (Group A); Skeid (Group B); Mjølner (District IX–X); Kirkenes (District XI)
- Promoted: Mjøndalen (Group A); Skeid (Group B); Mjølner (District IX–X)
- Relegated: Drafn (Group A); Aurskog (Group B); Eidsvold Turn (Group B)

The 1971 2. divisjon was a Norwegian second-tier football league season.

The league was contested by 30 teams, divided into a total of four groups; A and B (non-Northern Norwegian teams) and two district groups which contained teams from Northern Norway: district IX–X and district XI. The winners of group A and B and District IX–X were promoted to the 1972 1. divisjon, and the winners of the district groups qualified for the Northern Norwegian final. The winner of district XI was not eligible for promotion. The bottom team in all groups were relegated to the 3. divisjon. The two second last teams in group A and B met in a qualification round where the losing team was relegated to the 3. divisjon.

== Overview ==
=== Summary ===
Mjøndalen won group A with 20 points. Skeid won group B with 22 points. Both teams promoted to the 1972 1. divisjon.

== Tables ==
=== Group A ===
Pos	Team	Pld	W	D	L	GF	GA	GD	Pts	Promotion, qualification or relegation
1	Mjøndalen (C, P)	14	8	4	2	25	10	+15	20	Promotion to First Division
2	Start	14	7	5	2	23	12	+11	19	
3	Østsiden	14	7	2	5	23	14	+9	16	
4	Vard	14	5	6	3	20	20	0	16	
5	Ulf	14	4	4	6	13	18	−5	12	
6	Pors	14	4	3	7	15	23	−8	11	
7	Odd (O)	14	3	3	8	11	21	−10	9	Qualification for the relegation play-offs
8	Drafn (R)	14	3	3	8	11	23	−12	9	Relegation to Third Division

Source: rsssf.no
Rules for classification: 1) points; 2) goal difference; 3) number of goals scored.
(C) Champions; (O) Play-off winners; (P) Promoted; (R) Relegated

=== Group B ===
Pos	Team	Pld	W	D	L	GF	GA	GD	Pts	Promotion, qualification or relegation
1	Skeid (C, P)	14	10	2	2	26	7	+19	22	Promotion to First Division
2	Steinkjer	14	7	2	5	17	16	+1	16	
3	Aalesund	14	6	3	5	15	12	+3	15	
4	Stabæk	14	5	4	5	15	20	−5	14	
5	Raufoss	14	6	1	7	21	20	+1	13	
6	Molde	14	4	3	7	16	19	−3	11	
7	Aurskog (R)	14	3	5	6	7	16	−9	11	Qualification for the relegation play-offs
8	Eidsvold Turn (R)	14	2	6	6	7	14	−7	10	Relegation to Third Division

Source: rsssf.no
Rules for classification: 1) points; 2) goal difference; 3) number of goals scored.
(C) Champions; (P) Promoted; (R) Relegated

=== District IX–X ===
Pos	Team	Pld	W	D	L	GF	GA	GD	Pts	Promotion or relegation
1	Mjølner (C, P)	14	9	3	2	35	10	+25	21	Promotion to First Division
2	Mo	14	8	4	2	18	8	+10	20	
3	Tromsø	14	7	5	2	29	21	+8	19	
4	Stålkameratene	14	5	5	4	15	18	−3	15	
5	Bodø/Glimt	14	5	2	7	10	19	−9	12	
6	Mosjøen	14	5	0	9	17	22	−5	10	
7	Harstad	14	3	4	7	14	21	−7	10	
8	Svolvær (R)	14	2	1	11	9	28	−19	5	Relegation to Third Division

Source: rsssf.no
Rules for classification: 1) points; 2) goal difference; 3) number of goals scored.
(C) Champions; (P) Promoted; (R) Relegated

=== District XI ===
Pos	Team	Pld	W	D	L	GF	GA	GD	Pts	Relegation
1	Kirkenes (C)	8	5	2	1	20	9	+11	12	
2	Stein	8	5	2	1	19	9	+10	12	
3	Polarstjernen	8	2	4	2	7	9	−2	8	
4	Norild	8	1	3	4	8	16	−8	5	
5	Vadsø Turn	8	1	1	6	6	17	−11	3	
6	Alta (R)	0	0	0	0	0	0	0	0	Relegation to Third Division (Note: Alta was disqualified and all results involving Alta did not count.)

Source: rsssf.no
Rules for classification: 1) points; 2) goal difference; 3) number of goals scored.
(C) Champions; (R) Relegated

== Relegation play-offs ==
=== Results ===
- Aurskog – Odd 0–0
- Odd – Aurskog 2–0

Odd won the qualification round 2–0 on aggregate and remained in the 2. divisjon. Aurskog was relegated to the 3. divisjon.

== Northern Norwegian Final ==
A Northern Norwegian Final was played between the winners of the two district groups, Mjølner and Kirkenes.

- Mjølner – Kirkenes 3–0
