= Arild Mathisen =

Norwegian footballer (born 1942)

Arild Mathisen (born 14 March 1942, in Drammen) is a Norwegian former footballer who played as a defender. At club level, Mathisen played for Åssiden, Vålerenga and Strømsgodset. He won one league title with Vålerenga in 1965, and another with Strømsgodset in 1970. He also won the Norwegian cup in 1969 and 1970 with Godset. Internationally he was capped 29 times for the Norway national team.
