= Bjørn Odmar Andersen =

Norwegian footballer (1943–2008)

Personal information
- Date of birth: 14 March 1943
- Place of birth: Horten, Norway
- Date of death: 4 January 2008 (aged 64)
- Position: Winger

Senior career*
Years	Team	Apps	(Gls)
- Ørn-Horten
1963–1964	Brann	25	(10)
- Ørn-Horten
1969–1973	Strømsgodset	80	(4)
- Ørn-Horten

International career
1961–1963	Norway	10	(0)
- * Club domestic league appearances and goals

Bjørn Odmar Andersen (14 March 1943 – 4 January 2008) was a Norwegian footballer who played for Ørn-Horten, Brann and Strømsgodset. His position on the pitch was winger. Born in Horten, Andersen joined Brann in 1963, while serving his military service at the Haakonsvern naval base near Bergen and was part of the Brann team that won the Norwegian league title in 1963. Andersen spent two seasons at Brann, and later joined Strømsgodset where he won a second League title in 1970, as well as the Norwegian Cup in 1969, 1970 and 1973. He also won 10 caps for Norway. He managed Strømsgodset IF in 1985.
