= Frode Larsen =

Norwegian footballer (1949-2017)

Personal information
- Full name: Frode Larsen
- Date of birth: 16 June 1949
- Place of birth: Bergen, Norway
- Date of death: 20 June 2017 (aged 68)
- Place of death: Bergen, Norway
- Position: Right wing

Senior career*
Years	Team	Apps	(Gls)
1967–1979	Brann	161	(15)

International career
1975	Norway	7	(0)
- * Club domestic league appearances and goals

Frode Larsen (16 June 1949 − 20 June 2017) was a Norwegian footballer who played for SK Brann as a right-winger. He played a total of 211 first-team games for the club between 1967 and 1979, scoring 26 goals. He was also capped seven times by Norway.

He was a member of the Brann teams that won the Norwegian Cup in 1972 and 1976.
