= Egil Olsen (footballer, born 1948) =

Norwegian footballer (1948–2018)

Personal information
- Date of birth: 23 July 1948
- Place of birth: Drammen, Norway
- Date of death: 27 July 2018 (aged 70)
- Position: Midfielder

Senior career*
Years	Team	Apps	(Gls)
1967–1971	Strømsgodset		
1972–1973	Skeid		
1974–1975	Strømsgodset		

International career
1966	Norway U19	5	(1)
1967–1970	Norway U21	6	(0)
1970–1971	Norway	4	(0)
- * Club domestic league appearances and goals

Egil Olsen (23 July 1948 – 27 June 2018) was a Norwegian footballer. He played in four matches for the Norway national football team from 1970 to 1971.

== Honours ==
- Norwegian league: 1970
- Norwegian cup: 1969, 1970
