= Aasmund Sandland =

Norwegian footballer (born 1949)

Personal information
- Full name: Aasmund Olav Sandland
- Date of birth: 4 July 1949 (age 77)
- Position: Midfielder

Youth career
- Lyn

Senior career*
Years	Team	Apps	(Gls)
1969–1976	Lyn	117	(26)
1979	Eidsvold Turn		
1980–1982	Stabæk		

International career
1967	Norway U19	2	(2)
1970–1971	Norway U21	7	(0)
1971	Norway	2	(0)
- * Club domestic league appearances and goals

Aasmund Olav Sandland (born 4 July 1949) is a Norwegian football midfielder and later lawyer.

He spent most of his career in Lyn, amassing 117 league games and 26 cup games. Four of the seasons were spent on the first tier, four on the second tier. Sandland also represented Norway as an U19, U21 and senior international. He later played for Eidsvold Turn in 1979, then Stabæk from 1980 through 1982.

Sandland later became a lawyer, and was among others a defender in the Heggelund case.
