= Grue Stadion =

Multi-purpose stadium in Grue, Norway

Coordinates: 60°27′00″N 12°03′34″E

Grue Stadion is a municipal multi-purpose stadium located in the village of Kirkenær in Grue Municipality in Innlandet county, Norway. It opened in 1975 and is home to Grue IL. The stadium's peak attendance of between 4,000 and 5,000 dates from 1975 and 1976, when the team played in the Second Division. In 1990, Kongsvinger played a single match in the First Division at Grue Stadion. The venue hosted a Norway national under-21 football team match once, on 17 August 1977, when Norway beat Finland 1–0.
