= Tor Fuglset =

Norwegian footballer (born 1951)

Personal information
- Full name: Tor Fuglset
- Date of birth: 23 April 1951 (age 75)
- Place of birth: Molde, Norway
- Position: Midfielder

Senior career*
Years	Team	Apps	(Gls)
–1968	Molde FK		
1968–1969	Odda IL		
1969–1970	Fredrikstad FK	27	(8)
1971–1972	FK Lyn	26	(9)
1972–1973	FC Den Haag	12	(3)
1979	Molde FK	0	(0)

International career
1968–1969	Norway U19	5	(0)
1970–1971	Norway U21	6	(3)
1970–1972	Norway	9	(2)
- * Club domestic league appearances and goals

Tor Fuglset (born 23 April 1951) is a former football midfielder. Fuglset played for the clubs Molde FK, Odda IL, Fredrikstad FK, FK Lyn and FC Den Haag, and Norway national football team before he retired from football in young age. He is the brother of Jan Fuglset.

== Club career ==
Fuglset started his career in his hometown-club Molde FK. In 1968, Molde played in the third tier in Norway, and 17-year-old Fuglset played regularly on Molde's team. Molde met Fredrikstad FK, the club where Tor Fuglset's brother Jan Fuglset where playing, in the quarter-final of 1968 Norwegian Football Cup. The younger brother Tor scored Molde's first goal, while the elder brother Jan provided the final goal in a match Fredrikstad won 4–3.

Fuglset had a short spell in Odda IL, before moving to Fredrikstad FK in 1969, where he scored six goals in his first nine league-games. He scored one goal in the 1969 Cup Final, which Fredrikstad lost against Strømsgodset IF. He played for Fredrikstad for two seasons, and scored eight goals in twenty-seven matches before he moved on to FK Lyn.

The midfielder made his debut for Lyn on 26 April 1971, and scored two goals when Lyn won 7–1 against SK Frigg. In the two seasons Fuglset played for Lyn, he played twenty-six league-matches and scored nine goals, and two matches against Sporting in the 1971–72 European Cup Winners' Cup.

Fuglset moved on to the Dutch club FC Den Haag in 1973, where he experienced big success. In fact, big European clubs was ready to sign Fuglset, but he had to retire due to a heart defect.

In 1975, after his retirement, Fuglset helped 17-year-old Roger Albertsen to get a professional contract with his old club FC Den Haag.

After being medically cleared by doctors, Fuglset announced his comeback for Molde FK in 1979. He trained with the club, and appeared in a couple of friendlies, but never played any league or cup matches.

== International career ==
Tor Fuglset was capped 9 times for Norway, scoring two goals, and made his debut against Sweden in September 1970 in a game that Sweden won 4–2, but after the match the Norwegian media agreed that Fuglset made the best national team debut since Roald "Kniksen" Jensen in 1960.

He also played for five matches for Norway national under-19 football team and scored three goals in six matches for Norway national under-21 football team

== Honours ==
Fredrikstad FK

- Norwegian Football Cup: Runner-up 1969

FK Lyn

- Norwegian First Division: Runner-up 1971
