= Tore Antonsen =

Norwegian footballer (born 1950)

Personal information
- Date of birth: 9 March 1950 (age 76)
- Place of birth: Hamar, Norway
- Position: Goalkeeper

International career
Years	Team	Apps	(Gls)
1972–1981	Norway	8	(0)

Tore Antonsen (born 9 March 1950) is a Norwegian footballer. He played in eight matches for the Norway national football team from 1972 to 1981.
