= Jan Wraży =

Polish footballer (1943–2019)

Personal information
- Full name: Jan Aleksander Wraży
- Date of birth: 10 October 1943
- Place of birth: Lwow, Poland (now Lviv, Ukraine)
- Date of death: 7 April 2019 (aged 75)
- Place of death: Mons, Belgium
- Height: 1.73 m (5 ft 8 in)
- Position: Defender

Youth career
- 1953–1965: OMTUR Rozbark Bytom

Senior career*
Years	Team	Apps	(Gls)
1965–1970	GKS Katowice	106	(0)
1970–1975	Górnik Zabrze	113	(0)
1975–1981	Valenciennes	138	(2)
1981–1982	RFC Hautrage		
1984–1985	Stade Vieux-Condéen		

International career
1968–1972	Poland	7	(0)

Managerial career
- 1981–1982: RFC Hautrage (player-manager)
- 1984–1985: Stade Vieux-Condéen (player-manager)
- * Club domestic league appearances and goals

Jan Aleksander Wraży (10 October 1943 – 7 April 2019) was a Polish footballer who played as a defender. He played seven times for Poland.

== Honours ==
Górnik Zabrze

- Ekstraklasa: 1970–71, 1971–72
- Polish Cup: 1970–71, 1971–72
