= Dick Schneider =

Dutch footballer (1948–2025)

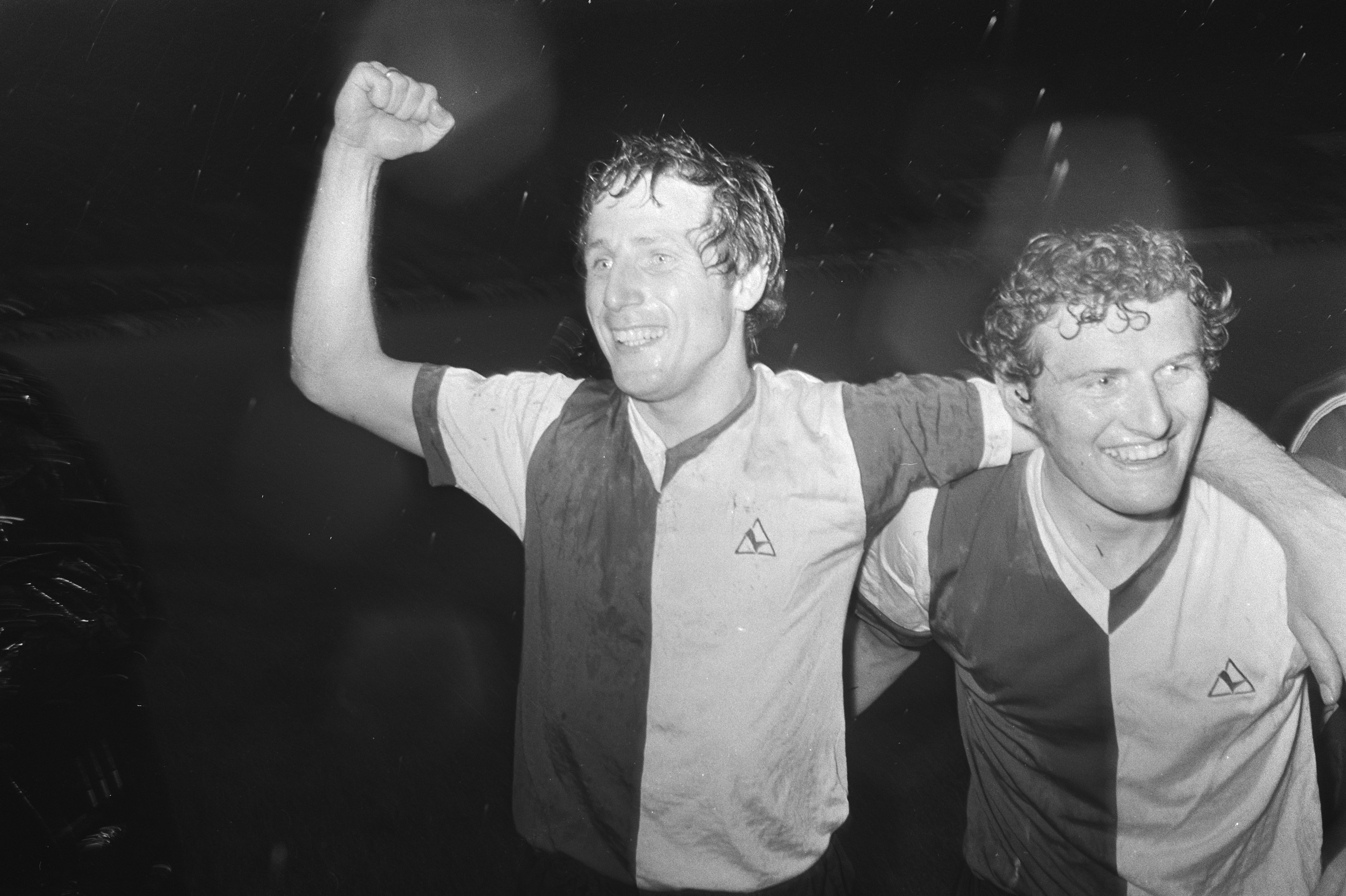
- Schneider (left) and Wim Jansen (1971)

Personal information
- Full name: Derk Schneider
- Date of birth: 21 March 1948
- Place of birth: Deventer, Netherlands
- Date of death: 26 July 2025 (aged 77)
- Place of death: Arnhem, Netherlands
- Position: Defender

Youth career
- Sallandia
- Go Ahead

Senior career*
Years	Team	Apps	(Gls)
1965–1970	Go Ahead	111	(12)
1970–1978	Feyenoord (Note: "Feijenoord" until 1978)	219	(52)
1978–1981	Go Ahead	107	(16)
1981–1982	Vitesse	32	(7)
1982	SV Zutphen		
1983	Go Ahead Eagles	11	(1)
1983–1984	Wageningen	31	(3)

International career
1972–1974	Netherlands U-19	4	(0)
1972–1974	Netherlands	11	(2)
- * Club domestic league appearances and goals

Derk "Dick" Schneider (21 March 1948 in Deventer – 26 July 2025 in Arnhem) was a Dutch footballer who played as a defender. He made his professional debut at Go Ahead and also played for Feyenoord, Vitesse and Wageningen.

== Club career ==
Born in Deventer, Schneider started playing football at local amateur side Sallandia before joining professional neighbors Go Ahead. He went on to score 29 goals in 232 games for them during several different spells. Between 1970 and 1978 he would accumulate over 260 matches (58 goals) for Rotterdam powerhouse Feyenoord, winning the league title in his first season at the club and adding one in 1974 as well as the 1974 UEFA Cup.

== International career ==
Schneider made his debut for the Oranje in May 1972 friendly match against Peru and earned a total of 11 caps, scoring 2 goals. His final international was an October 1974 friendly against Switzerland. Nicknamed Knakkie, he rejected the chance to go to the 1974 FIFA World Cup after an alleged dispute over money.

== Personal life and death ==
Schneider was injured in a road accident in 1978 in which another person died.

After his playing career, Schneider worked as technical director at Volendam and Go Ahead Eagles. He also coached amateur sides DVV Turkse Kracht, Daventria, DVV IJsselstreek and SV Wilp.

Schneider died on 26 July 2025 in Arnhem, at the age of 77.
