= Arnfinn Espeseth =

Norwegian footballer (born 1945)

Personal information
- Date of birth: 23 December 1945 (age 80)
- Position: Midfielder

International career
Years	Team	Apps	(Gls)
1970–1971	Norway	2	(1)

Arnfinn Espeseth (born 23 December 1945) is a Norwegian footballer. He played in two matches for the Norway national football team from 1970 to 1971.
