= Per Rune Wølner =

Norwegian footballer (1949-2016)

Personal information
- Full name: Per Rune Wølner
- Date of birth: 14 June 1949
- Place of birth: Drammen, Norway
- Date of death: 15 October 2016 (aged 67)
- Place of death: Drammen, Norway
- Position: Defender

Youth career
- Strømsgodset

Senior career*
Years	Team	Apps	(Gls)
1968–1980	Strømsgodset	234	(3)
- * Club domestic league appearances and goals

Per Rune Wølner (14 June 1949 – 15 October 2016) was a Norwegian footballer who played as a right-back for Strømsgodset in his hometown Drammen. Wølner spent his entire 13-year career at Strømsgodset, making his first-team debut in 1968. He was a member of the Strømsgodset sides that won the Norwegian Premier League in 1970, and the Norwegian Cup in 1969, 1970 and 1973. He played a total of 234 league and cup matches for the club, scoring three goals.

Wølner died on 15 October 2016, after a lengthy battle against cancer.
