= Gossen IL =

Norwegian sports club

- Full name: Gossen Idrettslag
- Founded: 1967
- Ground: Riksfjord stadion Gossa
- League: 5. Divisjon
Home colours

Gossen Idrettslag is a Norwegian sports club from Aukra Municipality. It has sections for association football, handball and volleyball.

The club was founded as a merger of Sør-Gossen FK and Nord-Gossen IL in 1967.

The men's football team plays in the 6. Divisjon, the seventh tier of Norwegian football. The team had a long streak in the 3. Divisjon, last from 1998 through 2006. Their best-known players are the Rindarøy and Breivik brothers, Knut Olav and Ole Martin, Emil Breivik and Mathias Varhaugvik Breivik.
