= 1970 Norwegian First Division =

26th season of top-tier football league in Norway

1. divisjon
- Season: 1970
- Dates: 27 April – 18 October
- Champions: Strømsgodset; 1st title
- Relegated: Skeid; Pors
- European Cup: Strømsgodset
- UEFA Cup: Rosenborg
- Matches: 90
- Goals: 210 (2.33 per match)
- Top goalscorer: Steinar Pettersen (16 goals)
- Biggest home win: Strømsgodset 7–1 Pors (3 May 1970)
- Biggest away win: Pors 0–6 Hødd (18 October 1970)
- Highest scoring: Strømsgodset 7–1 Pors (3 May 1970)
- Longest winning run: Brann (6 games)
- Longest unbeaten run: Brann (9 games)
- Longest winless run: Pors (9 games)
- Longest losing run: Pors (9 games)
- Highest attendance: 15,200; Strømsgodset 2–0 Rosenborg (11 October 1970)
- Lowest attendance: 1,000; Hødd 2–0 Pors (21 June 1970)
- Average attendance: 5,636 ▼25.7%

The 1970 1. divisjon was the 26th completed season of top division football in Norway.

== Overview ==
It was contested by 10 teams, and Strømsgodset won the championship, their first league title.

== Teams and locations ==
Note: Table lists in alphabetical order.

Team	Ap.	Location
Brann	18	Bergen
Fredrikstad	25	Fredrikstad
HamKam	2	Hamar
Hødd	3	Ulsteinvik
Pors	5	Porsgrunn
Rosenborg	8	Trondheim
Sarpsborg FK	20	Sarpsborg
Skeid	24	Oslo
Strømsgodset	5	Drammen
Viking	23	Stavanger

== League table ==
Pos	Team	Pld	W	D	L	GF	GA	GD	Pts	Qualification or relegation
1	Strømsgodset (C)	18	11	3	4	36	21	+15	25	Qualification for the European Cup first round
2	Rosenborg	18	10	4	4	15	5	+10	24	Qualification for the UEFA Cup first round
3	HamKam	18	10	3	5	31	15	+16	23	
4	Brann	18	9	5	4	18	11	+7	23	
5	Sarpsborg FK	18	9	3	6	21	21	0	21	
6	Viking	18	8	3	7	27	20	+7	19	
7	Fredrikstad	18	5	6	7	16	21	−5	16	
8	Hødd	18	4	3	11	20	27	−7	11	
9	Skeid (R)	18	4	3	11	16	23	−7	11	Relegation to Second Division
10	Pors (R)	18	3	1	14	10	46	−36	7	Relegation to Second Division

Source: NIFS
Rules for classification: 1) points; 2) goal difference; 3) number of goals scored.
(C) Champions; (R) Relegated

== Results ==
Home \ Away	BRA	FRE	HAM	HØD	POR	ROS	SRP	SKE	STM	VIK
Brann	—	1–0	0–3	2–0	1–0	0–1	0–1	2–0	1–0	2–1
Fredrikstad	0–0	—	0–0	2–2	1–2	1–0	2–3	1–3	2–0	0–2
HamKam	0–1	0–0	—	4–1	6–0	1–0	2–0	1–1	4–1	4–2
Hødd	1–2	1–2	1–0	—	2–0	0–0	0–2	0–0	1–3	1–0
Pors	0–3	0–1	0–1	0–6	—	0–2	1–2	2–1	1–3	1–1
Rosenborg	0–0	2–0	3–0	1–0	1–0	—	0–1	1–0	1–0	1–0
Sarpsborg	1–1	1–1	1–0	2–1	0–1	0–0	—	0–3	0–2	2–1
Skeid	1–1	0–1	0–1	1–0	4–1	0–2	1–2	—	0–2	0–3
Strømsgodset	0–0	2–2	4–2	4–3	7–1	2–0	2–1	1–0	—	1–0
Viking	2–1	2–0	0–2	2–0	4–0	0–0	3–2	2–1	2–2	—

Source: nifs.no (in Norwegian)
Legend: Blue = home team win; Yellow = draw; Red = away team win.

== Season statistics ==
=== Top scorer ===
- (Norway) Steinar Pettersen, Strømsgodset – 16 goals

=== Attendances ===
Pos	Team	Total	High	Low	Average	Change
1	Strømsgodset	90,814	15,200	6,000	10,090	+11.6%
2	Brann	71,300	10,300	4,800	7,922	−0.6%
3	Rosenborg	70,930	15,169	4,500	7,881	−43.5%
4	Skeid	54,182	8,938	3,787	6,020	−35.6%
5	Viking	51,600	8,000	1,500	5,733	−26.9%
6	HamKam	45,600	7,500	3,500	5,067	n/a^{2}
7	Fredrikstad	42,063	8,874	1,597	4,674	−22.8%
8	Sarpsborg FK	31,154	5,862	1,783	3,462	−10.9%
9	Pors	29,900	7,500	1,500	3,322	n/a^{2}
10	Hødd	19,700	3,500	1,000	2,189	−36.0%
	League total	507,243	15,200	1,000	5,636	−25.7%

Source: nifs.no
Notes:
2: Team played last season in 2. divisjon.
