= Thorodd Presberg =

Norwegian footballer and bandy player (born 1944)

Thorodd Presberg (born 18 January 1944 in Drammen) is a Norwegian former football and bandy player. A forward, he played football for Drafn from 1960 to 1963 and for Strømsgodset from 1963 till 1973. He played 234 top class games, scoring 125 goals, and he won three Norwegian cup championships and one league championship. He also played four matches and scored one goal for the Norwegian national team.

He later became a referee at Norwegian elite leveland was FIFA referee for ten years, and lead the Norwegian cup final in 1983 and in 1988 He managed Strømsgodset IF from 1976 to 1977.

== Bandy ==
Five Norwegian championships in Bandy for Strømsgodset and one for Drafn, and finished his career at Bragerøen before starting as coach. He played 29 national team matches, was an international bandy referee and took charge of the Norwegian bandy final in 1987. Presberg was a silver medalist in the 1965 Bandy World Championship.

In 1986, he coached his former club Drafn to the League Championship.
