= Ørsta IL =

Norwegian sports club

- Full name: Ørsta Idrettslag
- Founded: 1928
Home colours

Ørsta Idrettslag is a sports club based in Ørsta, Møre og Romsdal, Norway. It has sections for alpine skiing, association football, track and field, team handball, and cross-country skiing.

As of the 2019 season, the men's football team was playing in 4. divisjon, the fifth-tier in the Norwegian football league system. It last played in the fourth-tier 3. divisjon in the 2007 season, and in the third-tier 2. divisjon in the 2000 season.
