= Askim FK =

Norwegian football club

- Full name: Askim Fotballklubb
- Founded: 21 November 1989
- Ground: Askim kunstgress, Askim
- League: 5. divisjon
- 2019: 8th

Askim Fotballklubb was a Norwegian association football club from Askim, Østfold.

It was founded on 21 November 1989 as a breakout entity of the multi-sports club Askim IF.

On 1 January 2020 Askim FK gave way to the new club Askim Fotball as a result of a merger with Korsgård IF (founded 1984).

The men's football team last played in the 2019 5. divisjon, the sixth tier of Norwegian football. Throughout the 1990s it was an unstable 3. divisjon club (fourth tier), being relegated in 1993, 1996, 1999, and later also in 2004, 2010 and 2013. It was then relegated from the 4. divisjon in 2018.
