= Grue IL =

Norwegian sports club

- Full name: Grue Idrettslag
- Founded: 1906
- Ground: Grue Stadion; Kirkenær
- League: 5. divisjon
- 2018: 5. divisjon group 2, 2nd
Home colours

Grue Idrettslag is a Norwegian sports club from Grue Municipality, founded in 1906. It has sections for association football, team handball, athletics, orienteering, sport shooting and Nordic skiing.

== Football ==
The men's football team currently play in the 5. divisjon, the sixth tier of Norwegian football. The team played in the 3. divisjon from 2014, the fourth tier of Norwegian football. The team last played on this tier in 2007. Before that long Third Division stint, Grue played in the 2. divisjon until 1994. In 1976 and 1977 the team even played on the second tier. The club's greatest player throughout its history is Ståle Solbakken.

=== Recent seasons ===
Season		Pos.	Pl.	W	D	L	GS	GA	P	Cup	Notes
2010	4. divisjon, gr. 3	3	22	17	1	4	92	38	52	dnq	
2011	4. divisjon, gr. 3	3	20	12	4	4	57	36	40	dnq	
2012	4. divisjon, gr. 3	2	20	17	0	3	57	24	51	dnq	
2013	4. divisjon, gr. 3	↑ 1	22	18	2	2	101	25	56	dnq	Promoted to 3. divisjon
2014	3. divisjon, gr. 3	6	26	10	8	8	46	53	38	1st round	
2015	3. divisjon, gr. 2	↓ 14	26	1	2	23	15	113	5	dnq	Relegated to 4. divisjon
2016	4. divisjon, gr. 3	↓ 9	22	5	4	13	30	63	19	1st round	Relegated to 5. divisjon
2017	5. divisjon, gr. 2	3	23	15	3	5	63	34	48	dnq	
2018	5. divisjon, gr. 2	2	18	12	3	3	64	19	39	dnq	

== Athletics ==
The club has had a few national champions in athletics. Grete Gjermshus won the shot put in 1988 and 1989, after several silver and bronze medals earlier. In 1946 Thorvald Wilhelmsen won both 5000 and 10,000 metres; he had previously represented the neighbors Grue Finnskog IL. The club also became Norwegian champion in the 4 x 100 metres relay in 1936.
