= IL Norild =

Norwegian football club

- Full name: Idrettslaget Norild
- Founded: 17 March 1935
- Ground: Vadsø Stadion, Vadsø
- Capacity: 1000
- Manager: Johan Rollstad
- League: 2019 3. divisjon
- 2018: 2018 4. divisjon / 24, 1st (promoted)
Home colours	Away colours	Third colours

Idrettslaget Norild is a Norwegian association football club based in Vadsø.

They play home games at Vadsø Stadion. They currently play in the Third Division (fourth tier). It last played in the Second Division in 1994. The club is exclusively engaged with football, and is the largest football club in Vadsø. They have approximately 300 members, of which 260 are active players. Sigurd Rushfeldt, Morten Gamst Pedersen and Steffen Nystrøm are notable former players.
