= Askøy FK =

Norwegian football club

Askøy
- Full name: Askøy Fotballklubb
- Founded: 3 March 1999
- Ground: Kleppestø kunstgress, Kleppestø
- Capacity: c.1000
- Chairman: Leif-Arne Korneliussen
- Manager: Knut Helge Hatletvedt
- League: 3. divisjon
- 2024: 3. divisjon group 1, 4th of 14
Home colours	Away colours

Askøy Fotballklubb is a Norwegian football club from Kleppestø in Askøy Municipality, founded on 3 March 1999 as a merger between Florvåg IF and Kleppestø FK.

The men's team currently plays in the Fifth Division, the sixth tier of Norwegian football, after last playing in the Third Division in 2011. The club played in the Second Division in 2006 and 2007, having previously played in the Third Division since the club was formed.

The women's team plays in the lower divisions.

== Recent history, men's team ==
Season		Pos.	Pl.	W	D	L	GS	GA	P	Cup	Notes
2001	3. Division, section 15	2	22	15	2	5	81	42	47		
2002	3. Division, section 15	2	22	14	4	4	70	41	46		
2003	3. Division, section 14	3	22	11	6	5	70	43	39	1st qualifying round	
2004	3. Division, section 15	2	22	12	5	5	67	43	41	1st round	
2005	3. Division, section 14	1	22	17	4	1	79	11	55	1st round	Promoted to 2. Division
2006	2. Division, section 3	11	26	8	3	15	36	62	27	2nd round	
2007	2. Division, section 3	13	26	8	0	18	40	84	24	2nd round	Relegated to 3. Division
2008	3. Division, section Hordaland 2	7	22	8	4	10	49	51	28	2nd qualifying round	
2009	3. Division, section Hordaland 1	5	22	10	4	8	61	56	34	1st qualifying round	
2010	3. Division, section Hordaland 1	6	22	10	3	9	49	52	33	1st qualifying round	
2011	3. Division, section 7	13	26	5	3	18	40	89	18	2nd qualifying round	Relegated to 4. Division
2012	4. Division, section Hordaland 1	10	24	9	3	12	35	40	30	1st qualifying round	
2013	4. Division, section Hordaland 1										
