= Odda FK =

Norwegian football club

- Full name: Odda Fotball Klubb
- Founded: 1 December 1992
- Ground: Odda stadion, Odda
- League: Sixth Division
Home colours

Odda Fotball Klubb is a Norwegian association football club from the town of Odda in Ullensvang Municipality in Vestland county.

It was founded on 1 December 1992 as a merger between Odda IL and Fonna. Its first sponsor was Norzink.

The men's football team currently plays in the Sixth Division, the seventh tier of Norwegian football league system. Its most famous former player is Håkon Opdal.
