= Steinar Pettersen =

Norwegian footballer and bandy player (born 1945)

Personal information
- Date of birth: 29 April 1945 (age 81)
- Place of birth: Drammen

Senior career*
Years	Team	Apps	(Gls)
1962–1975	Strømsgodset		

International career
1968–1972	Norway	7	(0)

Managerial career
- 1979: Strømsgodset
- * Club domestic league appearances and goals

Steinar Pettersen (born 29 April 1945 in Drammen) is a former football and bandy international from Norway.

== Career ==
He played for Strømsgodset IF from 1962 to 1975. He played 282 matches, scoring 234 goals in football, he played even more and scored likewise for the bandy team. He won 6 caps in football and 25 in bandy. He won a silver medal with Norway in the 1965 Bandy World Championship in Moscow.

He scored all four goals in the Norwegian bandy final of 1962, beating Sparta/Bragerøen 4–0. He was then 16 years of age. He won six Norwegian championships in this sport. He won the Norwegian 1st division (football) in 1970, and three Cups in 1969, 1970, and 1973.

Pettersen played European football against teams such as Leeds United, Liverpool, FC Nantes, and Arsenal and won acclaim from English players and managers.

== Managerial career ==
He later managed Strømsgodset IF.
