= Sportsklubben Stag =

Norwegian sports club

Stag
- Full name: Sportsklubben Stavern Agnes
- Founded: 17 June 1945
- Ground: Stagbanen; Kaken
- Chairman: Bjørn Erik Brandsæter Helgeland
Home colours	Away colours

Sportsklubben Stag is a Norwegian sports club that does football, handball, and gymnastics.

The club was founded on 17 June 1945 after a merger between Stavern Idrettsforening and Agnes Idrettsforening, hence the name Stag. Football was the first activity in SPKL Stag. As the first club in the district, the club took up handball in the summer of 1945. In 1969, the gymnastics group joined. The club has about 1000 members divided into the activities football, handball and gymnastics. The club's colors are green and white.

Football group in Stag reached their top flight in the 1960s when, after two promotions in a row, they played in the Klasse B (second highest division) in 1969. The club has also raised the former national team players Reidar Sundby and his son, Tom Sundby.

In the autumn of 2015, work began on laying artificial grass on the turf. The number of training hours has doubled, and the club is ready to grow even more. Stag Football has about 300 members and consists of just under 40 teams. In 2020 Stag has 7 youth men's teams and 1 youth women's, 20 boys' teams and 5 girls' teams.
