= SK Falken =

Norwegian speed skating club

- Full name: Sportsklubben Falken
- Founded: 9 February 1925

Sportsklubben Falken is a Norwegian speed skating club from Trondheim.

The club was founded in 1925. It formerly had sections for association football, track and field, orienteering, Nordic skiing, ice hockey and dancing. The club was a member of the Workers' Sports Federation before the war. Workers' sports clubs with the name SK Falken also existed in Oslo and Bergen.

Well-known speed skaters include Hjalmar Andersen, Sverre Farstad and Henry Wahl (the "Falken Trio"), Villy Haugen, Jan Egil Storholt and Eskil Ervik.
