= Østsiden IL =

Norwegian sports club

- Full name: Østsiden Idrettslag
- Founded: 14 June 1935
- Head coach: Tor Arild Haddal
- League: 4. Divisjon
- 2018: 3. divisjon, 13th (relegated)
Home colours	Away colours

Østsiden Idrettslag Fredrikstad is a Norwegian sports club, based in the city of Fredrikstad. The men's football team currently plays in the Norwegian second division.

The club was formed as Østsiden IL on 14 June 1935, and includes football and handball branches. The name "Østsiden Idrettslag Fredrikstad" was introduced after a merge between Østsiden IL and the handball club Fredrikstad HK on 29 November 2007.

Notable former players on Østsiden IL's male football team include Jørn Andersen and Egil Olsen. The team reached the quarter finals in the Norwegian Football Cup in 1962, after beating FC Lyn in the fourth round. The club was relegated from the Second Division in 2008, and played three seasons in the Third Division before they won promotion in 2011. The club finished the 2013 season as 13th in their Second Division group, and was relegated to the Third Division.
