= Eidsvold TF =

Norwegian sports club

Eidsvold Turn
- Full name: Eidsvold Turnforening
- Founded: 29 April 1910; 116 years ago
- Ground: Myhrer stadion, Eidsvoll
- Capacity: 3,000
- Chairman: Terje Røsrud
- Coach: Johan Andersson
- League: 1. Divisjon
- 2026: 2. divisjon Group 2, 1st of 14 (Promoted)
Home colours	Away colours

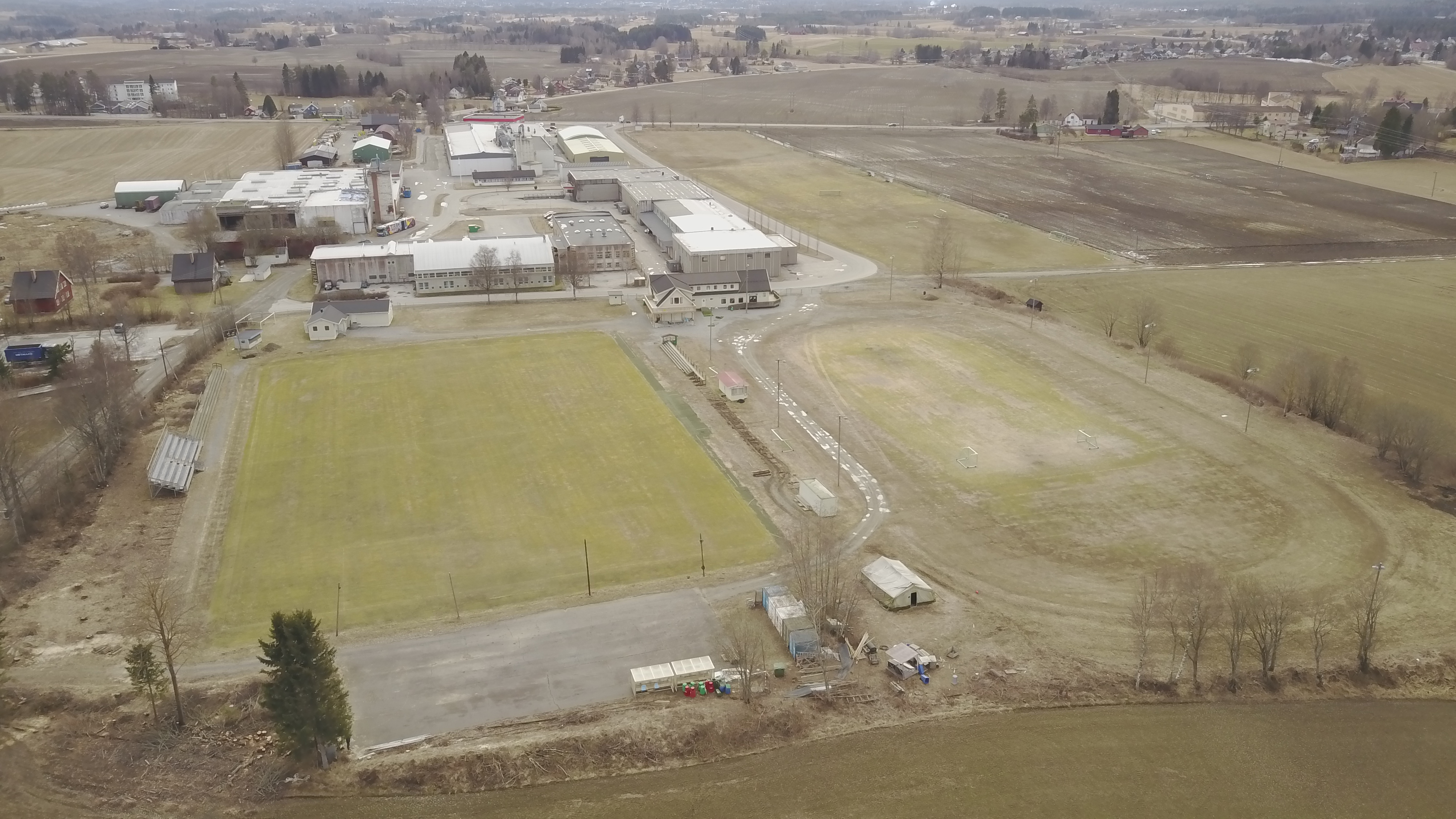
Myhrer stadion

Eidsvold Turnforening also known as Eidsvoll TF is a Norwegian sport club from Eidsvoll, Akershus. It has sections for association football, team handball, track and field, gymnastics and speed skating.

The men's football team currently plays in the Norwegian First Division from 2027, the second tier of Norwegian football, after being promoted from the 2026 Norwegian Second Division.

== History ==
The club was founded as Eidsvold IL on 29 April 1910, and the name was changed to Eidsvold TF in 1912. It acquired its current stadium site, Myhrer, in 1916.

In 2026, Eidsvold Turn secure promotion to Norwegian First Division from next season after champions of 2. divisjon Group 2.

== Recent seasons ==
Season	League									Cup	Notes
Season	Division	Pos.	Pl.	W	D	L	GS	GA	P	Cup	Notes
2011	3. divisjon	2	26	21	1	4	117	34	64	Second qualifying round	
2012	3. divisjon	↑ 1	24	19	3	2	80	25	60	First round	Promoted
2013	2. divisjon	7	26	10	6	10	43	51	36	First round	
2014	2. divisjon	4	26	13	6	7	59	34	45	First round	
2015	2. divisjon	↓ 12	26	7	7	12	47	53	28	Second round	Relegated
2016	3. divisjon	1	26	23	0	3	114	22	69	Second round	
2017	3. divisjon	3	26	19	1	6	60	24	58	Second qualifying round	
2018	3. divisjon	2	26	18	6	2	67	20	60	First round	
2019	3. divisjon	↑ 1	26	22	2	2	73	17	68	Second round	Promoted
2020	2. divisjon	9	13	5	1	7	25	33	16	Cancelled	
2021	2. divisjon	8	26	11	6	9	45	47	39	Second round	
2022	2. divisjon	↓ 12	26	8	4	14	35	54	28	Third round	Relegated
2023	3. divisjon	↑ 1	26	25	0	1	109	26	75	First round	Promoted
2024	2. divisjon	4	26	14	4	8	53	45	46	Fourth round	
2025	2. divisjon	6	26	13	5	8	50	51	44	Second round	
2026	2. divisjon	↑ 1	26	19	3	4	63	27	60	First round	Promoted
2027	1. divisjon	TBD	30	0	0	0	0	0	0		

== Current squad ==
As of 26 August 2026

Note: Flags indicate national team as defined under FIFA eligibility rules; some limited exceptions apply. Players may hold more than one non-FIFA nationality.

No.	Pos.	Nation	Player
1	GK	NOR	Simen Lillevik Kjellevold
2	DF	NOR	Sebastian Stokke
3	DF	NOR	Christopher Notoane
4	DF	NOR	Henrik Thorkildsen
5	MF	NOR	Runar Johansen
6	DF	NOR	Kristian Håkenstad
7	DF	NOR	Erik Ruud
8	MF	NOR	Oliver Stenseth
9	FW	NOR	Herman Henriksen
11	MF	NOR	Benedict Notoane
12	GK	KOS	Mehmet Rrahmani
14	FW	NOR	Keerat Singh (on loan from Mjøndalen IF)

No.	Pos.	Nation	Player
15	MF	NOR	Matias Velldal
16	MF	NOR	Lucas Kolstad
17	MF	NOR	Simon Stenseth
18	MF	NOR	Tengel Lia Fredriksen
19	MF	NOR	Alieu Bandeh
20	DF	NOR	Heine Wiik Stigersand
21	FW	NOR	Lars Julian Fjeld
23	MF	NOR	Edin Øy
24	DF	NOR	Edonis Mulaj
26	FW	NOR	Filip Da Silva
28	MF	NOR	Brage Naustdal
32	MF	NOR	Jacob Jacobsen Bolsø

=== Out on loan ===
Note: Flags indicate national team as defined under FIFA eligibility rules; some limited exceptions apply. Players may hold more than one non-FIFA nationality.

No.	Pos.	Nation	Player
