= Aurskog-Finstadbru SK =

Norwegian sports club

- Full name: Aurskog-Finstadbru Sportsklubb
- Founded: 29 November 1903
- Ground: Aursmoen kunstgress, Aursmoen
- League: Fourth Division
Home colours

Aurskog-Finstadbru Sportsklubb is a Norwegian sports club from Aurskog-Høland, Akershus. It has sections for association football, handball, cycling, swimming, and Nordic skiing.

It was founded on 29 November 1903. The club's best known members are ski jumper Lasse Ottesen and speed skater Anette Tønsberg.

The men's football team plays in the Fourth Division, the fifth tier of Norwegian football. Its last stint in the Third Division came in 2009. Aurskog-Finstadbru had then been a mainstay at this tier for many years, after even contesting the Second Division in 1994.

In 2008 Kenneth Nysæther was a playing assistant coach, and in 2004 Gunnar Halle was a playing head coach.
