= Pors Fotball =

Norwegian football club

- Full name: Pors Fotball
- Nickname: Pors
- Founded: 25 May 1905; 121 years ago
- Ground: Pors Stadion; Porsgrunn
- Capacity: 7,000
- Chairman: Ronald Bøgeberg
- Manager: Magne Hesmyr Nilsen
- League: 2. divisjon
- 2024: 3. divisjon, group 2, 1st of 14 (promoted)
Home colours	Away colours

Pors Fotball is a Norwegian football club from Porsgrunn, currently playing in the 2. divisjon. Pors plays in blue jerseys, and their home ground is Pors Stadion. Notable former players include Jan Halvor Halvorsen and Erik Pedersen.

== History ==
The club was founded on 25 May 1905 under the name Lyn, and changed its name to IF Pors in 1914 because the original name was already in use. The best performances of the team was in 1948–49 and 1970 when they played in the top division. The team has had unsuccessful bids for promotion to the top division in 1972, 1979, 1981 and 1983.

Concurrent with the 1994 name change the club entered into a still ongoing elite-level athletics partnership with the other and dominant Grenland football club, Odd Grenland. In February 2005 IF Pors retained other sports activities whereas Pors Grenland Fotball was siphoned off as a separate sports team, however still under the auspices of IF Pors. In December 2009, the financial cooperation between Pors Grenland and Odd Grenland was terminated.

Between 2004 and 2006 the team played in the 1. divisjon but then slipped down to the 2. divisjon where they played until the team was relegated to 3. divisjon in 2014. Pors had been playing in 3. divisjon since 2017, but got promoted back to the 2. divisjon in 2024.

== Recent history ==
Season		Pos.	Pl.	W	D	L	GS	GA	P	Cup	Notes
2005	1. divisjon	6	30	13	11	6	47	45	50	Third round	
2006	1. divisjon	↓ 13	30	10	5	15	51	65	35	Third round	Relegated to the 2. divisjon
2007	2. divisjon	7	26	10	5	11	39	44	35	Second round	
2008	2. divisjon	4	26	15	6	5	62	41	51	Third round	
2009	2. divisjon	2	26	18	3	5	76	44	57	First round	
2010	2. divisjon	9	26	11	4	11	41	41	37	First round	
2011	2. divisjon	11	26	8	5	13	42	53	29	First round	
2012	2. divisjon	8	26	10	6	10	40	36	36	Second round	
2013	2. divisjon	5	26	12	5	9	44	44	41	Second round	
2014	2. divisjon	↓ 12	26	7	5	14	43	60	26	Second round	Relegated to the 3. divisjon
2015	3. divisjon	↑ 1	26	20	2	4	96	36	62	First round	Promoted to the 2. divisjon
2016	2. divisjon	↓ 12	26	9	2	15	44	71	29	First round	Relegated to the 3. divisjon
2017	3. divisjon	2	26	16	3	7	84	43	51	Second round	
2018	3. divisjon	7	26	11	4	11	58	51	37	First round	
2019	3. divisjon	7	26	11	3	12	42	44	36	Second round	

== Current squad ==
As of 2 September 2026

Note: Flags indicate national team as defined under FIFA eligibility rules; some limited exceptions apply. Players may hold more than one non-FIFA nationality.

No.	Pos.	Nation	Player
1	GK	NOR	Petter Hagen
3	DF	NOR	Simen Østby
4	MF	NOR	Kjetil Svarteberg
5	DF	NOR	Tobias Bless Garstad
6	DF	NOR	Mats Bruu
7	FW	NOR	Truls Kristian Moen
8	MF	NOR	Andreas Bakeng-Rogne
9	FW	NOR	Oskar Johnsen
10	MF	NOR	Stefan Mladenovic
11	MF	NOR	Jonas Seim (on loan from Start)
14	DF	NOR	Filip Sæther Kimerud
15	FW	NOR	Mats Mauset
16	DF	NOR	Brage Evensen
17	DF	NOR	Emmanuel Gisa

No.	Pos.	Nation	Player
18	MF	NOR	Viktor Namløs
19	MF	NOR	Mikkel Kiste-Johnsen (on loan from Urædd)
20	DF	NOR	Noah Riise (on loan from Hødd)
21	MF	NOR	Jarl-Emil Nesland
23	MF	NOR	Andreas Giske
24	GK	NOR	Sebastian Vassend
25	DF	NOR	Eirik Asante Gayi
26	MF	NOR	Markus Hammerbekk Lewis
27	FW	NOR	Jonas Lindvig
30	MF	NOR	Redon Pllana
31	MF	FIN	Joonas Kekarainen
55	DF	NOR	Alexander Bjørnhaug
77	FW	NOR	Christian Dankwah

=== Out on loan ===
Note: Flags indicate national team as defined under FIFA eligibility rules; some limited exceptions apply. Players may hold more than one non-FIFA nationality.

No.	Pos.	Nation	Player
2	MF	NOR	Simen Thorsen (at IF Urædd until 31 December 2026)
