= List of Norwegian bandy champions =

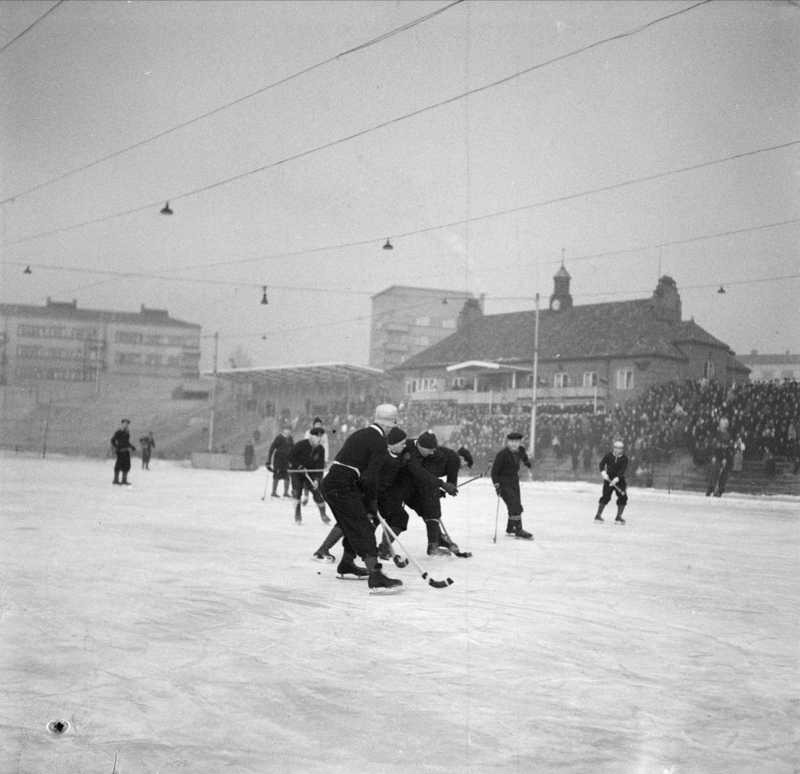
Mjøndalen IF beating Frigg Oslo 3–1 in the national bandy final of 1947

This list of Norwegian bandy champions shows all champions since the start. Championship for men's teams have been played since 1912, championship for women's teams have been played since 1984.

The winner of the men's teams championship is given a trophy called kongepokal ("king's cyp"). The team having won the most championships is Stabæk IF, having won 20 championships including the one in 2014, overtaking Drafn's 19 that year.

The Norwegian Bandy Premier League (Eliteserien) has been played since 1932 and consists (for the time being) of eight teams. After the regular league, the six leading of the league teams go to a play-off which decides what team will be the Norwegian champion.

From the start in 1912, bandy in Norway was played with seven players on each team and was called «ishockey» (literally "ice hockey"), but the sport was actually bandy. Starting in 1929, eleven-man teams have been used, just as in other countries, and the same year Norges Ishockeyforbund was renamed Norges Bandyforbund.

== Norwegian champions ==
7-a side bandy 1912–1928

Year	Champion	Score	Runner-up	Venue
1912	IF Ready	11–2	Kristiania Hockeyklub	Bislett stadion, Oslo
1913	IF Ready	w.o.	Kristiania Hockeyklub	
1914	Cancelled (Note: No championship was played in 1914 due to warm winter weather.)			
1915	IF Ready	11–3	SFK Trygg	Frogner stadion, Oslo
1916	IF Ready	14-6	SFK Trygg	Frogner stadion, Oslo
1917	IF Ready	21–7	Frigg Oslo FK	Frogner stadion, Oslo
1918	IF Ready	11-5	SFK Trygg	Frogner stadion, Oslo
1919	IF Ready	9-5	SFK Trygg	Frogner stadion, Oslo
1920	IF Ready	7-5 eeo.	SFK Trygg	Dælenenga, Oslo
1921	SFK Trygg	1-0	IF Ready	Dælenenga, Oslo
1922	IF Ready	5-3	SFK Trygg	Bislett stadion, Oslo
1923	IF Ready	6-1	Frigg Oslo FK	Marienlyst stadion, Drammen
1924	IF Ready	7-1	SK Drafn	Malakoff, Moss
1925	IF Ready	7-3	SK Drafn	Bislett stadion, Oslo
1926	SK Drafn	6-1	SFK Trygg	Marienlyst stadion, Drammen
1927	IF Ready	3-0	SFK Trygg	Bislett stadion, Oslo
1928	SK Forward	3-2	Grane FK	Dælenenga, Oslo

11-a side bandy since 1929

Year	Champion	Score	Runner-up	Venue
1929	B.14	3–1	SFK Trygg	Dælenenga, Oslo
1930	Mjøndalen IF	2–0	SFK Trygg	Marienlyst stadion, Drammen
1931	Grane FK	5–2	Mjøndalen IF	Kadettangen, Bærum
1932	SK Drafn	1-0	Grane FK	Dælenenga, Oslo
1933	SK Drafn	2–0	Grane FK	Marienlyst stadion, Drammen
1934	Grane FK	4–2	Stabæk IF	Dælenenga, Oslo
1935	SK Drafn	2–1	Stabæk IF	Mjøndalen
1936	Grane FK	2-1 eeo.	Mjøndalen IF	Dælenenga, Oslo
1937	Mjøndalen IF	4–0	Grane FK	Stabekkbanen, Bærum
1938	SK Drafn	2-2 eeo. Replay 4–2	Mjøndalen IF	Marienlyst stadion, Drammen; Mjøndalen
1939	SBK Skiold	1–0	SK Drafn	Marienlyst stadion, Drammen
1940	Mjøndalen IF	2–0	Stabæk IF	Kadettangen, Bærum
1941–1945: Cancelled (Note: No official championship was played due to World War II in 1941–1945. However, in 1943–1945 illegal championships were played. The unofficial champions for these years were Stabæk IF in 1943, Bestum IF in 1944 and Stabæk IF in 1945.)
1946	SK Drafn	1-1; Replay 3–1	Grane FK	Bislett stadion, Oslo; Marienlyst stadion, Drammen
1947	Mjøndalen IF	3–1	Frigg Oslo FK	Bislett stadion, Oslo
1948	SK Drafn	1–0	Frigg Oslo FK	Marienlyst stadion, Drammen
1949	Idrettslaget Mode	3-2 eeo.	SK Drafn	Marienlyst stadion, Drammen
1950	SK Drafn	3–1	Idrettslaget Mode	Kadettangen, Bærum
1951	SK Drafn	2-2; Replay 2–1	Idrettslaget Mode	Marienlyst stadion, Drammen; Kadettangen, Bærum
1952	Stabæk IF	4–3	Mjøndalen IF	Mjøndalen
1953	Stabæk IF	3–2	SK Drafn	Kadettangen, Bærum
1954	SK Drafn	3–1	Stabæk IF	Marienlyst stadion, Drammen
1955	Stabæk IF	3–1	Mjøndalen IF	Stabekkbanen, Bærum
1956	SK Drafn (Note: No play-off this year; the league winner was named champion.)			
1957	SBK Skiold			
1958	Sagene IF			
1959	SK Drafn			
1960	SK Drafn	0–1; 4-2 (Note: Final played as two matches.)	Sagene	Dælenenga, Oslo; Marienlyst stadion, Drammen
1961	SK Drafn	5–1	Sagene IF	Dælenenga, Oslo
1962	Strømsgodset IF	4–0	IF Sparta	Marienlyst stadion, Drammen
1963	Strømsgodset IF	5–0	SK Drafn	Marienlyst stadion, Drammen
1964	SK Drafn	4–2	Strømsgodset IF	Marienlyst stadion, Drammen
1965	Strømsgodset IF	5–0	SBK Skiold	Gulskogen, Drammen
1966	Sagene IF	1-1 eeo. Replay 2–1	Strømsgodset IF	Dælenenga, Oslo; Marienlyst stadion, Drammen
1967	Strømsgodset IF	2–1	Tåsen Idrettslag	Marienlyst stadion, Drammen
1968	Strømsgodset IF	5–3	SK Drafn	Gulskogen, Drammen
1969	Mjøndalen IF	2–1	SK Drafn	Mjøndalen
1970	Strømsgodset IF	3–1	Stabæk IF	Nadderud stadion, Bærum
1971	SK Drafn	4–2	Strømsgodset IF	Marienlyst stadion, Drammen
1972	SK Drafn	4–1	Mjøndalen IF	Marienlyst stadion, Drammen
1973	SK Drafn			
1974	Ullevål Idrettslag	3-2 eeo.	SK Drafn	Valle Hovin, Oslo
1975	Ullevål Idrettslag	5–0	Mjøndalen IF	Nedre Eiker stadion, Mjøndalen
1976	Mjøndalen IF	4–3	Stabæk IF	Valle Hovin, Oslo
1977	Stabæk IF	7–1	Ullevål Idrettslag	Valle Hovin, Oslo
1978	Ullevål Idrettslag	3–1	Mjøndalen IF	Valle Hovin, Oslo
1979	Mjøndalen IF	7–4	Ullevål Idrettslag	Valle Hovin, Oslo
1980	Mjøndalen IF	3–0	Ullevål Idrettslag	Valle Hovin, Oslo
1981	Solberg SK	4–2	Mjøndalen IF	Valle Hovin, Oslo
1982	Mjøndalen IF	6–4	Solberg SK	Valle Hovin, Oslo
1983	Solberg SK	7–5	Stabæk IF	Valle Hovin, Oslo
1984	Mjøndalen IF	9–5	Stabæk IF	Valle Hovin, Oslo
1985	Solberg SK	4–1	Mjøndalen IF	Valle Hovin, Oslo
1986	Solberg SK	7–3	SK Drafn	Valle Hovin, Oslo
1987	Stabæk IF	2–1	SK Drafn	Valle Hovin, Oslo
1988	Solberg SK	5–2	Stabæk IF	Valle Hovin, Oslo
1989	Solberg SK	9–1	Stabæk IF	Valle Hovin, Oslo
1990	Solberg SK	6–3	Stabæk IF	Valle Hovin, Oslo
1991	SK Drafn	5–2	Solberg SK	Vassenga, Mjøndalen
1992	Sarpsborg BK	5–1	SK Drafn	Sarpsborg kunstis, Sarpsborg
1993	Stabæk IF	11–1	Sarpsborg BK	Hauger idrettspark, Bærum
1994	Stabæk IF	5–0	Mjøndalen IF	Norges idrettshøgskole, Oslo
1995	Stabæk IF	3-2 eeo.	Solberg SK	Valle Hovin, Oslo
1996	Stabæk IF	8–0	Mjøndalen IF	Vikingskipet, Hamar
1997	Stabæk IF	11–2	Røa Idrettslag	Hauger idrettspark, Bærum
1998	Solberg SK	4-3 eeo.	Stabæk IF	Hauger idrettspark, Bærum
1999	Stabæk IF	6–4	Solberg SK	Hauger idrettspark, Bærum
2000	Stabæk IF	11–3	Røa Idrettslag	Hauger idrettspark, Bærum
2001	Stabæk IF	11–1	Mjøndalen IF	Hauger idrettspark, Bærum
2002	Mjøndalen IF	6–4	Stabæk IF	Hauger idrettspark, Bærum
2003	Mjøndalen IF	5–3	Sarpsborg BK	Hauger idrettspark, Bærum
2004	Mjøndalen IF	4–2	Stabæk IF	Hauger idrettspark, Bærum
2005	Mjøndalen IF	9–6	Solberg SK	Marienlyst stadion, Drammen
2006	Stabæk IF	5–4	Mjøndalen IF	Marienlyst stadion, Drammen
2007	Stabæk IF	6–3	Mjøndalen IF	Stabekkbanen, Bærum
2008	Stabæk IF	8–5	Solberg SK	Stabekkbanen, Bærum
2009	Stabæk IF	5–3	Solberg SK	Marienlyst stadion, Drammen
2010	Solberg SK	8–1	Stabæk IF	Marienlyst stadion, Drammen
2011	Stabæk IF	5–4	Mjøndalen IF	Marienlyst stadion, Drammen
2012	Stabæk IF	6–4	Solberg SK	Stabekkbanen, Bærum
2013	Ullevål Idrettslag	3-2 eeo.	Stabæk IF	Stabekkbanen, Bærum
2014	Stabæk IF	5–2	IF Ready	Marienlyst stadion, Drammen
2015	IF Ready	6–4	Stabæk IF	Frogner stadion, Oslo
2016	Stabæk IF	8–4	Solberg SK	Frogner stadion, Oslo

== Titles ==
=== Men's and women's titles the same year ===
Years	Club
4	Stabæk IF (1995, 2007, 2011, 2016)
