= Bandy in Norway =

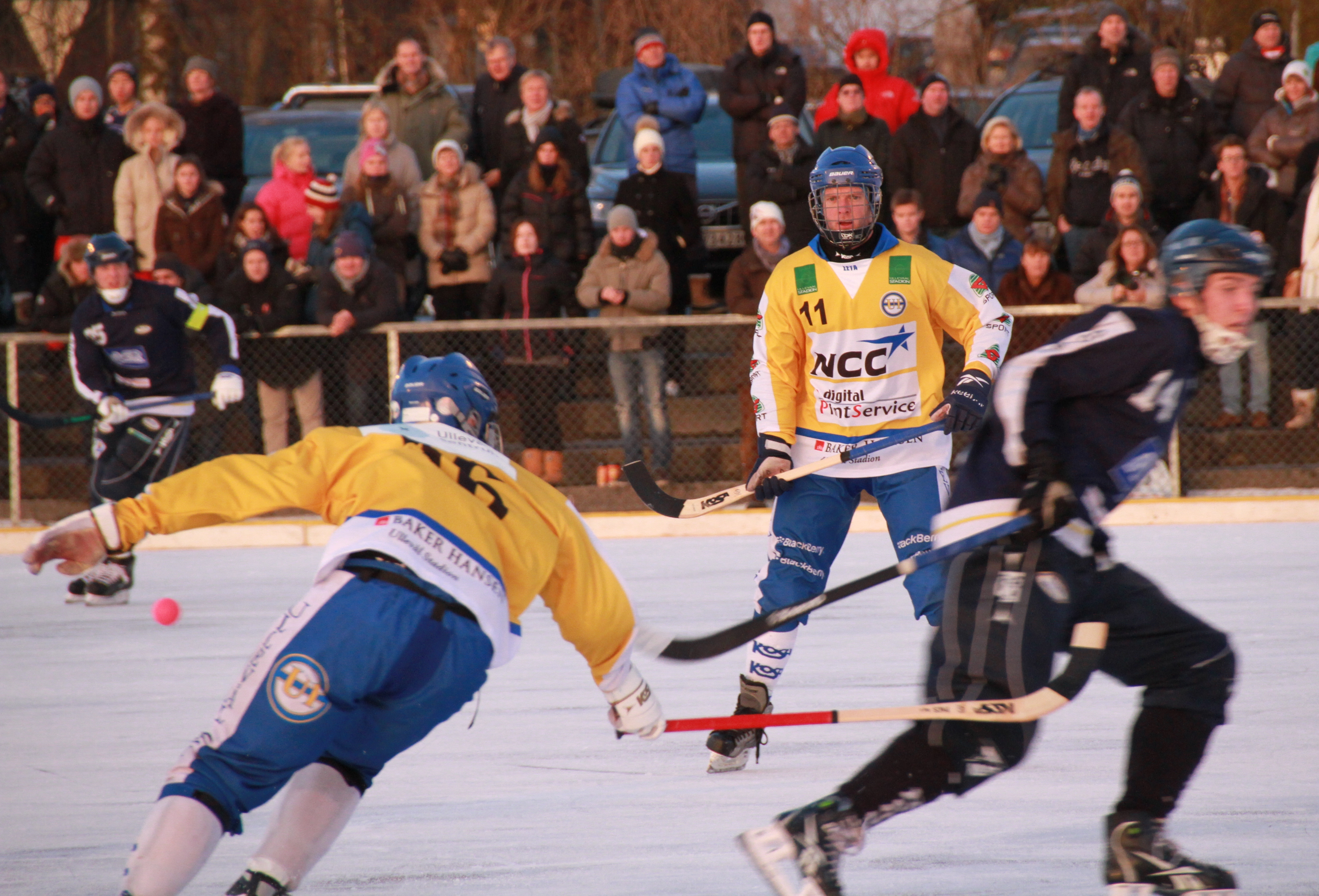
Ullevål IL plays IF Ready at Gressbanen Arena ni Oslo, Saint Stephen's Day, December 2011.

The Norwegian bandy season starts with the Kosa Open where the winner of the elite section qualifies for the Kopa Cup. Eight teams then contest the Norwegian Bandy Premier League. The league system comprises four leagues, with nineteen different clubs as well as ten B teams.

== List of clubs ==
The list of clubs is updated for the 2012–13 season.

=== Premier League ===
- Drammen, Drammen
- Høvik, Høvik, Bærum
- Mjøndalen, Mjøndalen
- Ready, Vestre Aker, Oslo
- Sarpsborg, Sarpsborg
- Solberg, Solbergelva
- Stabæk, Stabekk, Bærum
- Ullevål, Nordre Aker, Oslo

=== First Division ===
- Hamar, Hamar
- Nordre Sande, Sande i Vestfold
- Snarøya, Snarøya, Bærum
- Solberg 2, Solbergelva
- Stabæk 2, Stabekk, Bærum
- Ullern, Ullern, Oslo
- Ullevål 2, Nordre Aker, Oslo
- Øvrevoll Hosle, Hosle, Bærum

=== Second Division ===
- Drammen 2, Drammen
- Frigg, Frogner, Oslo
- Haslum, Haslum, Bærum
- Konnerud, Drammen
- Ready 2, Vestre Aker, Oslo
- Sarpsborg 2, Sarpsborg
- Øvrevoll Hosle 2, Hosle, Bærum

=== Third Division ===
- Bergen, Bergen
- Ready 3, Vestre Aker, Oslo
- Røa, Vestre Aker, Oslo
- Skeid, Nordre Aker, Oslo
- Strømsgodset, Drammen
- Ullern 2, Ullern, Oslo
  - NTNUI, Trondheim – pulled team
