= Norwegian Bandy Premier League 2011–12 =

Norwegian bandy league season

The 2011–12 season of the Norwegian Premier League, the highest bandy league for men in Norway.

Eighteen games were played, with 2 points given for wins and 1 for draws. Stabæk won the league, whereas Mjøndalen and Drammen survived a relegation playoff.

== League table ==
Pos	Team	P	W	D	L	F	A	GD	Pts
1	Stabæk	18	13	2	3	132	65	+67	28
2	Solberg	18	11	2	4	101	83	+18	24
3	Ready	18	10	1	7	74	67	+7	21
4	Ullevål	18	9	1	8	90	81	+8	19
5	Sarpsborg	18	8	1	9	99	101	-2	17
6	Høvik	18	7	1	10	103	123	–20	15
7	Mjøndalen	18	5	3	10	81	118	-37	13
8	Drammen	18	3	1	14	71	113	-36	7

League champion
Relegated to the First Division

Preceded by 2010–11	Norwegian Bandy Premier League; 2011–12	Succeeded by 2012–13
