= Norwegian Bandy Premier League 2021–22 =

Norwegian bandy league season

The 2021–22 season of the Norwegian Premier League, the highest bandy league for men in Norway.

Eighteen games were played, with 2 points given for wins and 1 for draws. Stabæk won the league, whereas Skeid were relegated and Ullern survived a relegation playoff.

== League table before closing ==
Pos	Team	P	W	D	L	F	A	GD	Pts
1	Stabæk	18	16	2	0	160	57	+103	34
2	Ready	18	15	1	2	135	39	+96	31
3	Solberg	18	12	1	5	106	69	+37	25
4	Mjøndalen	18	12	0	6	98	62	+36	24
5	Drammen	18	10	1	7	99	71	+28	21
6	Sarpsborg	18	6	2	10	95	79	+16	14
7	Ullevål	18	8	0	10	75	68	+7	16
8	Høvik	18	2	3	13	43	141	-98	7
9	Ullern	18	3	1	14	54	128	-74	7
10	Skeid	13	0	1	17	35	186	-151	1

League champion
Relegated to the First Division

== Relegation playoff ==
- Ullern beat NTNUI 2–1.

Preceded by 2020–21	Norwegian Bandy Premier League; 2021–22	Succeeded by 2022–23
