= Norwegian Bandy Premier League 2010–11 =

Norwegian bandy league season

The 2010–11 season of the Norwegian Premier League, the highest bandy league for men in Norway.

Eighteen games were played, with 2 points given for wins and 1 for draws. Solberg won the league, whereas Høvik and Drammen survived a relegation playoff.

== League table ==
Pos	Team	P	W	D	L	F	A	GD	Pts
1	Solberg	18	12	0	6	105	77	+28	24
2	Stabæk	18	11	1	6	98	67	+23	23
3	Sarpsborg	18	10	1	7	87	88	-1	21
4	Ready	18	9	3	6	85	72	+13	21
5	Ullevål	18	7	2	9	99	110	-11	16
6	Mjøndalen	18	7	1	10	103	112	-9	16
7	Høvik	18	6	2	10	103	118	–15	14
8	Drammen	18	5	0	13	67	103	-36	10

League champion
Relegated to the First Division

Preceded by 2009–10	Norwegian Bandy Premier League; 2010–11	Succeeded by 2011–12
