= Norwegian Bandy Premier League 2012–13 =

Norwegian bandy league season

The 2012–13 season of the Norwegian Premier League, the highest bandy league for men in Norway.

Eighteen games were played, with 2 points given for wins and 1 for draws. Stabæk won the league, whereas Drammen and Høvik survived a relegation playoff.

== League table ==
Pos	Team	P	W	D	L	F	A	GD	Pts
1	Stabæk	18	13	1	4	119	73	+46	27
2	Ullevål	18	12	1	5	88	61	+27	25
3	Ready	18	12	1	5	76	56	+20	25
4	Sarpsborg	18	8	3	7	88	90	-2	19
5	Mjøndalen	18	8	2	8	96	96	0	18
6	Solberg	18	5	4	9	89	97	-8	14
7	Drammen	18	6	1	11	73	89	-16	13
8	Høvik	18	0	3	15	76	153	–77	3

League champion
Relegated to the First Division

Preceded by 2011–12	Norwegian Bandy Premier League; 2012–13	Succeeded by 2013–14
