= Norwegian Bandy Premier League 2020–21 =

Norwegian bandy league season

The 2020–21 season of the Norwegian Premier League, the highest bandy league for men in Norway.

Eighteen games were supposed to be played, with 2 points given for wins and 1 for draws. Because of how the COVID-19 pandemic in Norway evolved, the league was stopped in the midst of the 14th round, with the last match having been played 17 January 2021.

After league play could not commence again, for medal purposes the league was reset to the 9th round, when every team had faced each other once. With this setup, Ready won the league ahead of Stabæk and third-placed Solberg. No teams were relegated.

== League table before closing ==
Pos	Team	P	W	D	L	F	A	GD	Pts
1	Solberg	14	10	3	1	78	39	+39	23
2	Stabæk	14	11	1	2	112	41	+71	23
3	Ready	13	10	1	2	78	35	+43	21
4	Drammen	14	8	1	5	73	59	+14	17
5	Mjøndalen	14	7	2	5	90	51	+39	16
6	Ullern	14	3	5	6	49	62	-13	11
7	Sarpsborg	13	5	1	7	58	89	-31	11
8	Ullevål	13	2	1	10	32	72	-40	5
9	Høvik	14	1	3	10	37	108	-71	5
10	Skeid	13	1	2	10	38	89	-51	4

League champion
Relegated to the First Division

Preceded by 2019–20	Norwegian Bandy Premier League; 2020–21	Succeeded by 2021–22
