= Norwegian Bandy Premier League 2019–20 =

Norwegian bandy league season

The 2019–20 season of the Norwegian Premier League, the highest bandy league for men in Norway.

Eighteen games were played, with 2 points given for wins and 1 for draws. Ready won the league, whereas Øvrevoll Hosle were relegated and Høvik survived a relegation playoff.

== League table ==
Pos	Team	P	W	D	L	F	A	GD	Pts
1	Ready	18	16	1	1	128	49	+79	33
2	Ullern	18	14	1	3	101	60	+41	29
3	Stabæk	18	14	0	4	154	47	+107	28
4	Solberg	18	12	0	6	95	70	+25	24
5	Drammen	18	10	1	7	86	54	+32	21
6	Mjøndalen	18	7	2	9	78	72	+6	16
7	Sarpsborg	18	5	2	11	63	97	-34	12
8	Ullevål	18	3	2	13	55	108	-53	8
9	Høvik	18	2	2	14	65	134	–69	6
10	Øvrevoll Hosle	18	1	1	16	28	162	-134	3

League champion
Relegated to the First Division

Preceded by 2018–19	Norwegian Bandy Premier League; 2019–20	Succeeded by 2020–21
