= Norwegian Bandy Premier League 2015–16 =

Norwegian bandy league season

The 2015–16 season of the Norwegian Premier League, the highest bandy league for men in Norway.

Eighteen games were played, with 2 points given for wins and 1 for draws. Stabæk won the league, whereas no teams were relegated.

== League table ==
Pos	Team	P	W	D	L	F	A	GD	Pts
1	Stabæk	18	16	2	0	144	40	+104	34
2	Solberg	18	10	4	4	109	65	+44	24
3	Mjøndalen	18	11	0	7	68	97	-14	22
4	Drammen	18	10	2	6	79	72	+7	22
5	Ready	18	8	4	6	74	59	+15	20
6	Ullern	18	9	1	8	79	59	+20	19
7	Høvik	18	6	4	8	65	95	–30	16
8	Sarpsborg	18	5	1	12	76	113	-37	11
9	Ullevål	18	4	3	11	65	75	-10	11
10	Hamar	18	0	1	17	47	146	-99	1

League champion
Relegated to the First Division

Preceded by 2014–15	Norwegian Bandy Premier League; 2015–16	Succeeded by 2016–17
