= Norwegian Bandy Premier League 2016–17 =

Norwegian bandy league season

The 2016–17 season of the Norwegian Premier League, the highest bandy league for men in Norway.

Eighteen games were played, with 2 points given for wins and 1 for draws. Stabæk won the league, whereas Sarpsborg were relegated and Ullevål survived a relegation playoff.

== League table ==
| Pos | Team | P | W | D | L | F | A | GD | Pts |
|---|---|---|---|---|---|---|---|---|---|
| 1 | Stabæk | 18 | 16 | 0 | 2 | 158 | 49 | +109 | 32 |
| 2 | Solberg | 18 | 15 | 1 | 2 | 110 | 61 | +49 | 31 |
| 3 | Ullern | 18 | 12 | 2 | 4 | 111 | 72 | +39 | 26 |
| 4 | Høvik | 18 | 11 | 0 | 7 | 114 | 82 | –32 | 22 |
| 5 | Drammen | 18 | 8 | 0 | 10 | 78 | 85 | -7 | 16 |
| 6 | Ready | 18 | 6 | 2 | 10 | 83 | 84 | -1 | 14 |
| 7 | Hamar | 18 | 6 | 1 | 11 | 61 | 120 | -59 | 13 |
| 8 | Mjøndalen | 18 | 4 | 2 | 12 | 62 | 126 | -64 | 10 |
| 9 | Ullevål | 18 | 4 | 1 | 13 | 50 | 95 | -45 | 9 |
| 10 | Sarpsborg | 18 | 3 | 1 | 14 | 70 | 123 | -53 | 7 |

| League champion |
| Relegated to the First Division |

| Preceded by 2015–16 | Norwegian Bandy Premier League; 2016–17 | Succeeded by 2017–18 |
