= Norwegian Bandy Premier League 2018–19 =

Norwegian bandy league season

The 2018–19 season of the Norwegian Premier League, the highest bandy league for men in Norway.

Eighteen games were played, with 2 points given for wins and 1 for draws. Stabæk won the league, whereas Konnerud were relegated and Høvik survived a relegation playoff.

== League table ==
Pos	Team	P	W	D	L	F	A	GD	Pts
1	Stabæk	18	17	1	0	171	39	+132	35
2	Solberg	18	12	2	4	123	75	+48	26
3	Drammen	18	10	2	6	88	82	+6	22
4	Ullern	18	10	1	7	90	79	+11	21
5	Ready	18	8	4	6	71	66	+5	20
6	Sarpsborg	18	6	3	9	72	86	-14	15
7	Ullevål	18	5	3	10	58	88	-30	13
8	Mjøndalen	18	5	2	11	56	87	-31	11
9	Høvik	18	4	1	13	75	130	–55	9
10	Konnerud	18	3	1	14	60	132	-72	7

League champion
Relegated to the First Division

Preceded by 2017–18	Norwegian Bandy Premier League; 2018–19	Succeeded by 2019–20
