= Norwegian Bandy Premier League 2013–14 =

Norwegian bandy league season

The 2013–14 season of the Norwegian Premier League, the highest bandy league for men in Norway.

Twenty-one games were played, with 2 points given for wins and 1 for draws. Stabæk won the league, whereas Høvik and Drammen survived a relegation playoff.

== League table ==
| Pos | Team | P | W | D | L | F | A | GD | Pts |
|---|---|---|---|---|---|---|---|---|---|
| 1 | Stabæk | 21 | 17 | 2 | 2 | 156 | 71 | +84 | 36 |
| 2 | Ready | 21 | 13 | 5 | 3 | 89 | 59 | +30 | 31 |
| 3 | Solberg | 21 | 12 | 1 | 8 | 108 | 88 | +20 | 25 |
| 4 | Sarpsborg | 21 | 11 | 3 | 7 | 98 | 97 | +1 | 25 |
| 5 | Ullevål | 21 | 9 | 4 | 8 | 79 | 71 | +8 | 22 |
| 6 | Mjøndalen | 21 | 4 | 6 | 11 | 73 | 103 | -30 | 14 |
| 7 | Høvik | 21 | 5 | 1 | 15 | 73 | 113 | –40 | 11 |
| 8 | Drammen | 21 | 1 | 2 | 18 | 61 | 135 | -74 | 4 |

| League champion |
| Relegated to the First Division |

| Preceded by 2012–13 | Norwegian Bandy Premier League; 2013–14 | Succeeded by 2014–15 |
