= Norwegian Bandy Premier League 2014–15 =

Norwegian bandy league season

The 2014–15 season of the Norwegian Premier League, the highest bandy league for men in Norway.

Twenty-one games were played, with 2 points given for wins and 1 for draws. Stabæk won the league, whereas no teams were regulated and the league was expanded with two teams from the following season.

== League table ==
Pos	Team	P	W	D	L	F	A	GD	Pts
1	Stabæk	21	17	2	2	164	52	+112	36
2	Solberg	21	18	0	3	141	61	+80	36
3	Ready	21	11	3	7	94	63	+31	25
4	Ullevål	21	11	3	7	89	67	+22	25
5	Høvik	21	7	1	13	71	107	–36	15
6	Sarpsborg	21	7	1	13	63	117	-54	15
7	Mjøndalen	21	6	1	14	68	97	-29	13
8	Drammen	21	1	1	19	32	158	-126	3

League champion
Relegated to the First Division

Preceded by 2013–14	Norwegian Bandy Premier League; 2014–15	Succeeded by 2015–16
