= Norwegian Bandy Premier League 2006–07 =

Norwegian bandy league season

The 2006–07 season of the Norwegian Premier League, the highest bandy league for men in Norway.

21 games were played, with 2 points given for wins and 1 for draws. Stabæk won the league, whereas Høvik was relegated.

== League table ==
Pos	Team	P	W	D	L	F	A	GD	Pts
1	Stabæk	21	18	0	3	179	69	+110	36
2	Solberg	21	17	1	3	140	56	+84	35
3	Ullevål	21	12	1	8	107	89	+18	25
4	Drammen	21	10	3	8	112	104	+6	23
5	Mjøndalen	21	11	1	9	140	105	+35	23
6	Ready	21	7	1	13	90	105	-15	15
7	Sarpsborg	21	5	0	16	85	144	-59	10
8	Høvik	21	0	1	20	43	224	-181	1

League champion
Relegated to the First Division

Preceded by 2005–06	Norwegian Bandy Premier League; 2006–07	Succeeded by 2007–08
