= Norwegian Bandy Premier League 2001–02 =

Norwegian Premier League

The 2001–02 season of the Norwegian Premier League, the highest bandy league for men in Norway.

8 games were played in an initial round, with a further 10 games for the top six teams. 2 points were given for wins and 1 for draws. Stabæk won the league, whereas xxxx was relegated.

== League table ==
=== First round ===
Pos	Team	P	W	D	L	F	A	GD	Pts
1	Stabæk	8	8	0	0	124	23	+99	16
2	Mjøndalen	8	6	0	2	78	26	+52	12
3	Sarpsborg	8	5	1	2	64	39	-25	11
4	Røa	8	4	1	3	49	49	+0	9
5	Solberg	8	4	0	4	46	62	+16	8
6	Ullern	8	3	1	4	27	76	-49	7
7	Ullevål	8	3	0	5	31	45	-14	6
8	Ready	8	1	1	6	18	64	-48	3
9	Drammen	8	0	0	8	18	71	-53	0

The top six teams progressed to the finals. Stabæk carried three bonus points into the finals, whereas Mjøndalen carried two and Sarpsborg one bonus point. The bottom three continued to a relegation playoff, which xxxx did not survive.

=== Finals ===
Pos	Team	P	W	D	L	F	A	GD	Pts
1	Stabæk	10	8	1	1	104	38	66	20
2	Mjøndalen	10	8	1	1	89	26	+63	19
3	Sarpsborg	10	5	1	4	61	50	+11	12
4	Solberg	10	4	1	5	63	79	-16	9
5	Røa	10	3	0	7	45	96	-51	6
6	Ullern	10	0	0	10	30	103	-73	0

League champion
Relegated to the First Division

Preceded by 2000–01	Norwegian Bandy Premier League; 2001–02	Succeeded by 2002–03
