= Norwegian Bandy Premier League 2008–09 =

Norwegian bandy league season

In the 2008–09 season of the Norwegian Premier League, the highest bandy league for men in Norway, 21 games were played, with 2 points given for wins and 1 for draws. Solberg won the league, whereas Mjøndalen and Ready survived a relegation playoff.

== League table ==
Pos	Team	P	W	D	L	F	A	GD	Pts
1	Solberg	21	17	1	3	161	61	+100	35
2	Stabæk	21	13	3	5	113	87	+26	29
3	Høvik	21	13	2	6	127	82	+45	28
4	Sarpsborg	21	9	2	10	95	104	-9	20
5	Drammen	21	8	3	10	89	103	-14	19
6	Ullevål	21	8	3	10	116	109	+7	19
7	Mjøndalen	21	8	1	12	85	131	-46	17
8	Ready	21	0	1	20	66	175	-109	1

League champion
Relegated to the First Division

Preceded by 2007–08	Norwegian Bandy Premier League; 2008–09	Succeeded by 2009–10
