= Norwegian Bandy Premier League 2007–08 =

The 2007–08 season of the Norwegian Premier League, the highest bandy league for men in Norway.

21 games were played, with 2 points given for wins and 1 for draws. Solberg won the league, whereas Hamar IL was relegated.

== League table ==
| Pos | Team | P | W | D | L | F | A | GD | Pts |
|---|---|---|---|---|---|---|---|---|---|
| 1 | Solberg | 21 | 18 | 2 | 1 | 190 | 67 | +123 | 38 |
| 2 | Stabæk | 21 | 17 | 1 | 3 | 180 | 68 | +112 | 35 |
| 3 | Ullevål | 21 | 13 | 0 | 8 | 126 | 94 | +32 | 26 |
| 4 | Drammen | 21 | 12 | 0 | 9 | 127 | 115 | +12 | 24 |
| 5 | Mjøndalen | 21 | 11 | 1 | 9 | 122 | 113 | +9 | 23 |
| 6 | Sarpsborg | 21 | 6 | 0 | 15 | 86 | 126 | -40 | 12 |
| 7 | Ready | 21 | 4 | 1 | 16 | 75 | 130 | -55 | 9 |
| 8 | Hamar | 21 | 0 | 1 | 20 | 59 | 252 | -193 | 1 |

| League champion |
| Relegated to the First Division |

| Preceded by 2006–07 | Norwegian Bandy Premier League; 2007–08 | Succeeded by 2008–09 |
