= Norwegian Bandy Premier League 1996–97 =

Norwegian bandy league season

The 1996–97 season of the Norwegian Premier League, the highest bandy league for men in Norway.

10 games were played, with 2 points given for wins and 1 for draws. Stabæk won the league, whereas Frem-31 were relegated. Ahead of the next season, Drafn was renamed Drammen Bandy through a merger.

== League table ==
Pos	Team	P	W	D	L	F	A	GD	Pts
1	Stabæk	21	20	0	1	175	49	+216	40
2	Røa	21	15	1	5	146	58	+88	31
3	Solberg	21	15	0	6	156	72	+82	30
4	Mjøndalen	21	10	3	8	86	76	+10	23
5	Ready	21	7	1	13	75	118	-43	15
6	Drafn	21	6	1	14	72	105	-33	13
7	Ullevål	21	6	1	4	70	128	-58	13
8	Frem-31	21	1	1	19	42	216	-174	3

League champion
Relegated to the First Division

Preceded by 1995–96	Norwegian Bandy Premier League; 1996–97	Succeeded by 1997–98
