= Norwegian Bandy Premier League 2005–06 =

Norwegian bandy league season

The 2005–06 season of the Norwegian Premier League, the highest bandy league for men in Norway.

21 games were played, with 2 points given for wins and 1 for draws. Stabæk won the league, whereas Øvrevoll/Hosle was relegated.

== League table ==
Pos	Team	P	W	D	L	F	A	GD	Pts
1	Stabæk	21	17	1	3	146	54	+92	35
2	Ullevål	21	15	3	3	117	69	+48	33
3	Mjøndalen	21	14	2	5	141	77	+64	30
4	Drammen	21	12	1	8	118	119	-1	25
5	Sarpsborg	21	8	2	11	80	86	-6	18
6	Solberg	21	7	2	12	95	121	-26	16
7	Ready	21	4	0	17	72	151	-79	8
8	Øvrevoll/Hosle	21	1	1	19	48	142	-96	3

League champion
Relegated to the First Division

Preceded by 2004–05	Norwegian Bandy Premier League; 2005–06	Succeeded by 2006–07
