= Norwegian Bandy Premier League 2017–18 =

Norwegian bandy league season

The 2017–18 season of the Norwegian Premier League, the highest bandy league for men in Norway.

Eighteen games were played, with 2 points given for wins and 1 for draws. Solberg won the league, whereas Hamar were relegated and Konnerud survived a relegation playoff.

== League table ==
Pos	Team	P	W	D	L	F	A	GD	Pts
1	Solberg	18	17	0	1	140	49	+91	34
2	Stabæk	18	14	1	3	147	49	+98	29
3	Ullern	18	11	3	4	111	70	+41	25
4	Ready	18	10	3	5	92	63	+29	23
5	Mjøndalen	18	9	2	7	92	72	+29	20
6	Drammen	18	9	1	8	76	83	-7	19
7	Høvik	18	6	2	10	98	124	–26	14
8	Ullevål	18	4	0	14	45	110	-65	8
9	Konnerud	18	3	0	15	75	140	-65	6
10	Hamar	18	1	0	17	46	162	-116	2

League champion
Relegated to the First Division

Preceded by 2016–17	Norwegian Bandy Premier League; 2017–18	Succeeded by 2018–19
