= Norwegian Bandy Premier League 2009–10 =

Norwegian bandy league season

The 2009–10 season of the Norwegian Premier League, the highest bandy league for men in Norway.

Eighteen games were played, with 2 points given for wins and 1 for draws. Solberg won the league, whereas Sarpsborg and Ullevål survived a relegation playoff.

== League table ==
Pos	Team	P	W	D	L	F	A	GD	Pts
1	Solberg	18	14	0	4	142	65	+77	28
2	Stabæk	18	11	1	6	86	68	+18	23
3	Ready	18	9	1	8	79	86	-7	19
4	Mjøndalen	18	8	0	10	69	86	-17	16
5	Høvik	18	8	0	10	101	90	+11	16
6	Drammen	18	6	3	9	78	106	-28	15
7	Sarpsborg	18	7	0	11	89	100	-11	14
8	Ullevål	18	6	1	11	81	124	-43	13

League champion
Relegated to the First Division

Preceded by 2008–09	Norwegian Bandy Premier League; 2009–10	Succeeded by 2010–11
