= Norwegian Bandy Premier League 2004–05 =

Norwegian bandy league season

The 2004–05 season of the Norwegian Premier League, the highest bandy league for men in Norway.

21 games were played, with 2 points given for wins and 1 for draws. Mjøndalen won the league, whereas no team was relegated, as the bottom two teams survived a playoff round.

== League table ==
Pos	Team	P	W	D	L	F	A	GD	Pts
1	Mjøndalen	21	18	1	2	160	67	+93	37
2	Stabæk	21	17	0	4	176	60	+116	34
3	Solberg	21	16	0	5	142	97	+45	32
4	Ullevål	21	9	1	11	110	117	-7	19
5	Sarpsborg	21	9	1	11	97	115	-18	19
6	Drammen	21	6	2	13	95	133	-38	14
7	Øvrevoll/Hosle	21	2	3	16	68	158	-90	7
8	Ready	21	3	0	18	60	161	-101	6

League champion
Relegated to the First Division

Preceded by 2003–04	Norwegian Bandy Premier League; 2004–05	Succeeded by 2005–06
