= Norwegian Bandy Premier League 1997–98 =

Norwegian sports league season

The 1997–98 season of the Norwegian Premier League, the highest bandy league for men in Norway.

10 games were played, with 2 points given for wins and 1 for draws. Stabæk won the league, whereas Drammen were relegated.

== League table ==
Pos	Team	P	W	D	L	F	A	GD	Pts
1	Stabæk	21	17	1	3	169	61	+108	35
2	Mjøndalen	21	15	2	4	127	68	+59	32
3	Solberg	21	14	1	6	126	87	+39	29
4	Ready	21	13	2	6	116	84	+32	28
5	Røa	21	11	1	9	111	86	+25	23
6	Ullevål	21	6	1	4	95	131	-36	13
7	Tåsen	21	2	1	18	52	138	-86	5
8	Drammen	21	1	1	19	43	184	-141	3

League champion
Relegated to the First Division

Preceded by 1996–97	Norwegian Bandy Premier League; 1997–98	Succeeded by 1998–99
