= Norwegian Bandy Premier League 1992–93 =

Season for the highest bandy league in Norway

The 1992–93 season of the Norwegian Premier League, the highest bandy league for men in Norway.

Ten games were played, with 2 points given for wins and 1 for draws. Stabæk won the league. Ready was relegated, whereas Røa survived a relegation playoff.

== League table ==
Pos	Team	P	W	D	L	F	A	GD	Pts
1	Stabæk	21	20	0	1	154	52	+102	40
2	Sarpsborg	21	13	2	6	121	74	+47	28
3	Mjøndalen	21	11	2	8	91	73	+18	24
4	Solberg	21	11	1	9	105	100	+5	23
5	Drafn	21	5	5	11	83	118	−35	13
6	Skeid	21	6	2	13	68	115	−47	14
7	Røa	21	5	3	13	83	118	−35	13
8	Ready	21	3	5	13	70	123	−53	11

League champion
Relegated to the First Division

Preceded by 1991–92	Norwegian Bandy Premier League; 1992–93	Succeeded by 1993–94
