= Norwegian Bandy Premier League 1998–99 =

Norwegian bandy league season

The 1998–99 season of the Norwegian Premier League, the highest bandy league for men in Norway.

10 games were played, with 2 points given for wins and 1 for draws. Stabæk won the league, whereas Ullevål were relegated following a playoff. The league was expanded with one team ahead of the next season.

== League table ==
Pos	Team	P	W	D	L	F	A	GD	Pts
1	Stabæk	21	19	1	1	206	69	+137	39
2	Solberg	21	15	2	4	167	94	+73	32
3	Røa	21	14	0	7	135	80	+55	28
4	Mjøndalen	21	13	2	6	?	?	?	28
5	Sarpsborg	21	6	3	12	76	120	-44	15
6	Ready	21	5	1	15	75	130	-55	11
7	Tåsen	21	2	3	16	55	144	-89	7
8	Ullevål	21	3	0	18	55	188	-133	6

League champion
Relegated to the First Division

Preceded by 1997–98	Norwegian Bandy Premier League; 1998–99	Succeeded by 1999–2000
