= Norwegian Bandy Premier League 1994–95 =

Norwegian bandy league season

The 1994–95 season of the Norwegian Premier League, the highest bandy league for men in Norway.

Ten games were played, with 2 points given for wins and 1 for draws. Solberg won the league. Sarpsborg was relegated, and as Strømsgodset disappeared as the league shrank with one team ahead of the next season.

== League table ==
Pos	Team	P	W	D	L	F	A	GD	Pts
1	Solberg	21	20	0	1	136	56	+80	40
2	Stabæk	21	12	4	5	94	53	+41	28
3	Røa	21	12	2	7	97	69	+28	26
4	Mjøndalen	21	8	6	7	103	78	+25	22
5	Ullevål	21	9	3	9	71	67	+4	21
6	Drafn	21	6	2	13	67	106	-39	14
7	Strømsgodset	21	5	1	15	65	118	-53	11
8	Sarpsborg	21	2	2	17	52	138	-85	6

League champion
Relegated to the First Division

Preceded by 1993–94	Norwegian Bandy Premier League; 1994–95	Succeeded by 1995–96
