= Norwegian Bandy Premier League 2000–01 =

Season of the Norwegian Premier League

The 2000–01 season of the Norwegian Premier League, the highest bandy league for men in Norway.

8 games were played in an initial round, with a further 10 games for the top six teams. 2 points were given for wins and 1 for draws. Stabæk won the league, whereas no team was relegated.

== League table ==
=== First round ===
Pos	Team	P	W	D	L	F	A	GD	Pts
1	Stabæk	8	8	0	0	96	16	+80	16
2	Røa	8	6	1	1	56	27	+29	13
3	Mjøndalen	8	6	1	1	49	23	+26	13
4	Solberg	8	5	0	3	49	30	+19	10
5	Ullevål	8	3	0	5	32	64	-32	6
6	Ullern	8	3	0	5	21	36	-15	6
7	Ready	8	1	1	6	21	56	-35	3
8	Drammen	8	1	1	6	30	58	-18	3
9	Sarpsborg	8	0	2	6	23	67	-44	2

The top six teams progressed to the finals. Stabæk carried three bonus points into the finals, whereas Røa carried two and Mjøndalen one bonus point. The bottom three continued to a relegation playoff, which all three teams survived.

=== Finals ===
Pos	Team	P	W	D	L	F	A	GD	Pts
1	Stabæk	10	8	1	1	76	31	+45	20
2	Mjøndalen	10	7	2	1	74	19	+55	17
3	Røa	10	6	1	3	77	45	+32	15
4	Solberg	10	4	0	6	37	51	-14	8
5	Ullern	10	2	0	8	20	94	-74	4
6	Ullevål	10	1	0	9	41	85	-44	2

League champion
Relegated to the First Division

Preceded by 1999–2000	Norwegian Bandy Premier League; 2000–01	Succeeded by 2001–02
