= Norwegian Bandy Premier League 1995–96 =

Norwegian bandy league season

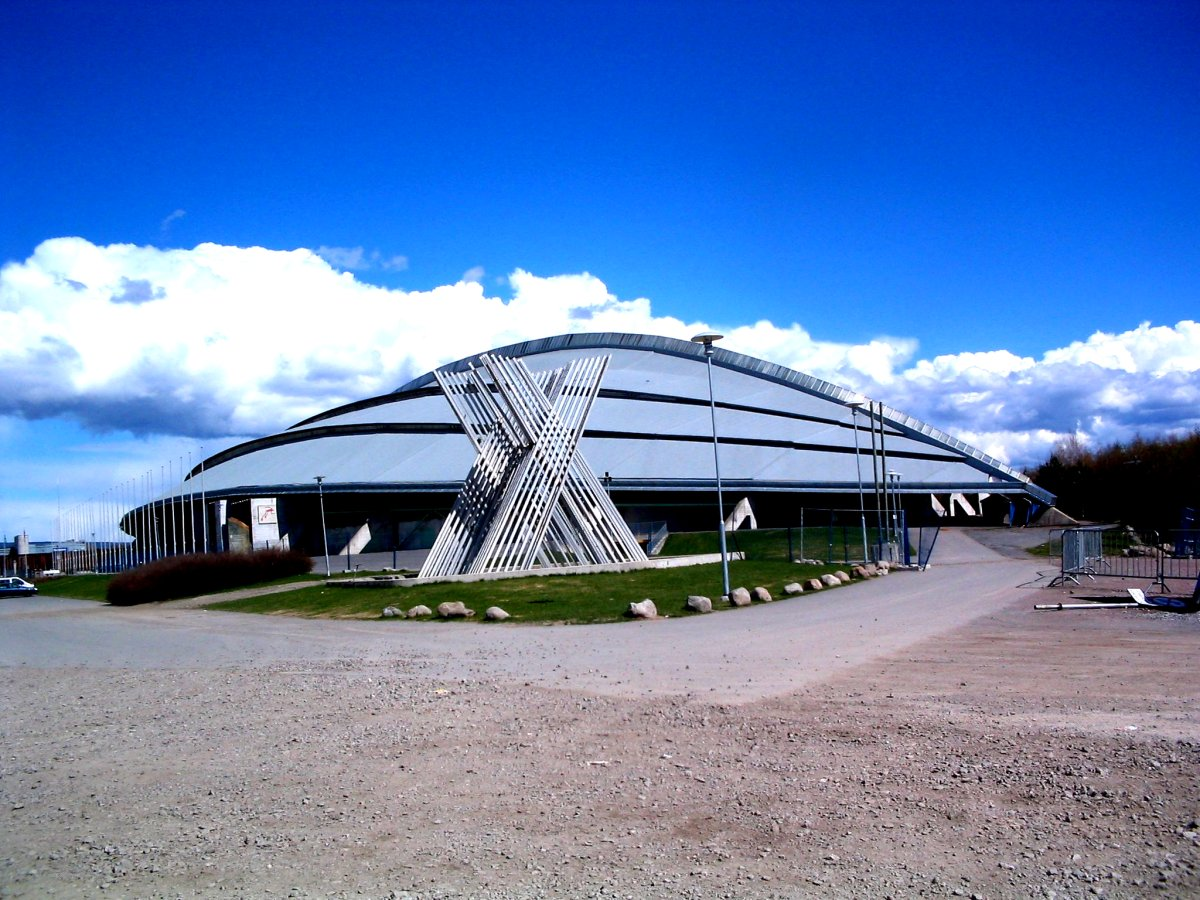
The bandy and speed skating arena The Viking Ship in Hamar, Norway, where the final was played

The 1995–96 season of the Norwegian Premier League, the highest bandy league for men in Norway.

10 games were played, with 2 points given for wins and 1 for draws. Stabæk IF won the league. No team was relegated, as SK Frem-31 survived a relegation playoff, and the league was expanded with one team ahead of the next season.

== League table ==
| Pos | Team | P | W | D | L | F | A | GD | Pts |
|---|---|---|---|---|---|---|---|---|---|
| 1 | Stabæk | 18 | 16 | 1 | 1 | 139 | 42 | +97 | 33 |
| 2 | Solberg | 18 | 12 | 0 | 6 | 132 | 58 | +74 | 24 |
| 3 | Ullevål | 18 | 7 | 6 | 5 | 57 | 70 | -13 | 20 |
| 4 | Mjøndalen | 18 | 7 | 3 | 8 | 68 | 65 | +3 | 17 |
| 5 | Røa | 18 | 5 | 4 | 9 | 41 | 81 | -40 | 14 |
| 6 | Drafn | 18 | 6 | 1 | 11 | 47 | 87 | -40 | 13 |
| 7 | Frem-31 | 18 | 2 | 1 | 15 | 42 | 123 | -81 | 5 |

| League champion |
| Relegated to the First Division |

| Preceded by 1994–95 | Norwegian Bandy Premier League; 1995–96 | Succeeded by 1996–97 |
