= Norwegian Bandy Premier League 1999–2000 =

Norwegian bandy league season

The 1999–2000 season of the Norwegian Premier League, the highest bandy league for men in Norway.

8 games were played in an initial round, with a further 10 games for the top six teams. 2 points were given for wins and 1 for draws. Stabæk won the league, whereas Tåsen was relegated.

== League table ==
=== First round ===
Pos	Team	P	W	D	L	F	A	GD	Pts
1	Stabæk	8	7	0	1	77	23	+54	14
2	Røa	8	7	0	1	67	21	+46	14
3	Drammen	8	5	0	3	44	40	+4	10
4	Mjøndalen	8	4	1	3	50	37	+13	9
5	Ullern	8	3	1	4	27	38	-11	7
6	Solberg	8	3	0	5	57	40	+14	6
7	Tåsen	8	3	0	5	33	46	-13	6
8	Sarpsborg	8	3	0	5	18	38	-20	6
9	Ready	8	0	0	8	14	104	-90	0

The top six teams progressed to the finals. Stabæk carried three bonus points into the finals, whereas Røa carried two and Drammen one bonus point. The bottom three continued to a relegation playoff, which only Tåsen did not survive.

=== Finals ===
Pos	Team	P	W	D	L	F	A	GD	Pts
1	Stabæk	10	7	1	2	62	27	+35	18
2	Mjøndalen	10	9	0	1	64	25	+39	18
3	Røa	10	6	0	4	56	39	+17	14
4	Solberg	10	4	0	6	38	50	-12	8
5	Drammen	10	2	1	7	34	72	-38	6
6	Ullern	10	1	0	9	29	70	-41	2

League champion
Relegated to the First Division

Preceded by 1998–99	Norwegian Bandy Premier League; 1999–2000	Succeeded by 2000–01
