= Norwegian Bandy Premier League 2003–04 =

Norwegian bandy league season

The 2003–04 season of the Norwegian Premier League, the highest bandy league for men in Norway.

20 games were played, with 2 points given for wins and 1 for draws. Mjøndalen won the league. No team was relegated; as the bottom two teams both survived a playoff round. Instead the league was expanded with two extra teams from the next season.

== League table ==
Pos	Team	P	W	D	L	F	A	GD	Pts
1	Mjøndalen	20	19	1	0	193	49	+144	39
2	Stabæk	20	16	1	3	185	51	+137	33
3	Ullevål	20	10	1	9	143	112	+31	21
4	Solberg	20	6	3	11	96	152	-56	15
5	Sarpsborg	20	3	3	14	61	166	-105	9
6	Drammen	20	1	1	18	55	203	-148	3

League champion
Relegated to the First Division

Preceded by 2002–03	Norwegian Bandy Premier League; 2003–04	Succeeded by 2004–05
