= Norwegian Bandy Premier League 1993–94 =

Norwegian bandy league season

The 1993–94 season of the Norwegian Premier League, the highest bandy league for men in Norway.

Ten games were played, with 2 points given for wins and 1 for draws. Stabæk won the league, whereas Skeid was relegated.

== League table ==
| Pos | Team | P | W | D | L | F | A | GD | Pts |
|---|---|---|---|---|---|---|---|---|---|
| 1 | Stabæk | 18 | 14 | 2 | 2 | 120 | 44 | +76 | 30 |
| 2 | Mjøndalen | 18 | 12 | 3 | 3 | 83 | 42 | +41 | 27 |
| 3 | Sarpsborg | 18 | 9 | 2 | 7 | 91 | 59 | +32 | 20 |
| 4 | Røa | 18 | 7 | 5 | 6 | 86 | 80 | +6 | 19 |
| 5 | Solberg | 18 | 8 | 2 | 8 | 71 | 86 | −15 | 18 |
| 6 | Ullevål | 18 | 5 | 3 | 10 | 47 | 91 | −44 | 13 |
| 7 | Drafn | 18 | 5 | 0 | 13 | 52 | 86 | −34 | 10 |
| 8 | Skeid | 18 | 3 | 1 | 14 | 55 | 117 | −62 | 7 |

| League champion |
| Relegated to the First Division |

| Preceded by 1992–93 | Norwegian Bandy Premier League; 1993–94 | Succeeded by 1994–95 |
