= Norwegian Bandy Premier League 2002–03 =

Norwegian bandy league season

The 2002–03 season of the Norwegian Premier League, the highest bandy league for men in Norway.

16 games were played, with 2 points given for wins and 1 for draws. Mjøndalen won the league. No team was relegated; as the bottom team survived a playoff round. Instead the league was expanded with one extra team from the next season.

== League table ==
Pos	Team	P	W	D	L	F	A	GD	Pts
1	Mjøndalen	16	15	0	1	147	61	+86	30
2	Sarpsborg	16	10	1	5	96	96	0	21
3	Solberg	16	6	1	9	77	98	-21	13
4	Stabæk	16	6	1	9	82	98	-17	13
5	Ullevål	16	1	1	14	63	112	-49	3

League champion
Relegated to the First Division

Preceded by 2001–02	Norwegian Bandy Premier League; 2002–03	Succeeded by 2003–04
