= Norwegian Bandy Premier League =

Men's bandy league in Norway

Eliteserien
- Current season, competition or edition: Norwegian Bandy Premier League 2020–21
- Sport: bandy
- Founded: 1932
- No. of teams: 10
- Country: Norway
- Continent: Europe
- Relegation to: 1. division

The Norwegian Bandy Premier League Norwegian: Eliteserien is the top level of bandy in Norway. National bandy champions have been named yearly since 1912, but the league was only founded in 1932.

The league consists of eight teams. After the regular league, the leading teams goes to a play-off which decides what team will be the Norwegian champion. Since 1976, the winner of the league is formally awarded the title league champion (Norwegian: seriemester), a title which however is not counted to be worth as much as the national championship title. Stabæk Idrettsforening won the final in 2016.

== Structure ==
All the eight teams plays the other teams three times during a season. At the end of the season, each team will have played 21 matches.

The teams are ranked according to the following:

1. Number of points (two for win, one for draw, nill for loss).
2. The results against each other.
3. Goal difference.
4. Number of goals scored.

The two bottom teams play a qualification round against the two top teams in the second highest division. The two teams which win the qualification round will play in the premier league in the next season.

== League Champions since 1976 ==
- 1975–76: Mjøndalen IF
- 1976–77: Mjøndalen IF
- 1977–78: Mjøndalen IF
- 1978–79: Mjøndalen IF
- 1979–80: Mjøndalen IF
- 1980–81: Mjøndalen IF
- 1981–82: Solberg SK
- 1982–83: Mjøndalen IF
- 1983–84: Solberg SK
- 1984–85: Mjøndalen IF
- 1985–86: SBK Drafn
- 1986–87: Solberg SK
- 1987–88: SBK Drafn
- 1988–89: Skeid
- 1989–90: Solberg SK
- 1990–91: SBK Drafn
- 1991–92: Sarpsborg BK
- 1992–93: Stabæk IF
- 1993–94: Stabæk IF
- 1994–95: Solberg SK
- 1995–96: Stabæk IF
- 1996–97: Stabæk IF
- 1997–98: Stabæk IF
- 1998–99: Stabæk IF
- 1999–2000: Stabæk IF
- 2000–01: Stabæk IF
- 2001–02: Stabæk IF
- 2002–03: Mjøndalen IF
- 2003–04: Mjøndalen IF
- 2004–05: Mjøndalen IF
- 2005–06: Stabæk IF
- 2006–07: Stabæk IF
- 2007–08: Solberg SK
- 2008–09: Solberg SK
- 2009–10: Solberg SK
- 2010–11: Solberg SK
- 2011–12: Stabæk IF
- 2012–13: Stabæk IF
- 2013–14: Stabæk IF
- 2014–15: Stabæk IF
- 2015–16: Stabæk IF
- 2016–17: Stabæk IF
- 2017–18: Solberg SK
- 2018–19: Stabæk IF
- 2019–20: IF Ready
- 2020–21: IF Ready
- 2021–22: Stabæk IF
- 2022–23: Sarpsborg BK
- 2023–24: Drammen
- 2024–25: IF Ready

== Norwegian Champions ==
The six top teams go to play-off for the national championship. Teams 3 and 4 in the table play against team 5 or 6. The winners of these matches meet team 1 and 2 in semi-finals. The winners of the semi-finals meet in the national championship final.
