= List of Norwegian women bandy champions =

This list of Norwegian women bandy champions shows all champions since the start. Championship for men's teams have been played since 1912, while championship for women's teams have been played since 1984.

The winner of the men's teams championship is given a trophy called kongepokal ("king's cyp"). A kongepokal was also given to the women's teams champions 1986–1995, but has since not been awarded the women champions because of too few participating teams in the championship tournament.

The premier league for women's teams consists of six teams. The top four teams go to a play-off for the championship. The women's championships has been played with teams with fewer players than the regular number of eleven from the official start in 1984, but the number of players has gradually been raised; since 2010 the women's championships is played with nine-player teams.

== Norwegian champions ==
Year	Champion	Score	Runner-up	Venue
1984	Vålerengens IF	11-4	Haslum Idrettslag	
1985	Idrettslaget Manglerud Star	5-5 (eeo.); 1-0 penalty shoot-out	Hasle-Løren Idrettslag	
1986	Vålerengens IF	9-1	Idrettslaget Manglerud Star	
1987	Vålerengens IF	5-3	Idrettslaget Manglerud Star	
1988	Vålerengens IF	5-1	Idrettslaget Manglerud Star	
1989	Hasle-Løren Idrettslag	10-5	Vålerengens IF	
1990	Hasle-Løren Idrettslag	21-4	Høvik IF	
1991	Hasle-Løren Idrettslag	21-0	Høvik IF	
1992	Hasle-Løren Idrettslag	16-4	Høvik IF	
1993	Hasle-Løren Idrettslag	14-7	IF Ready	
1994	Hasle-Løren Idrettslag	8-3	Høvik IF	
1995	Stabæk IF	6-2	Høvik IF	
1996	Høvik IF	4-2	Stabæk IF	
1997	Høvik IF	7-2	Bergen BK	
1998	Høvik IF	5-4	Bergen BK	
1999	Bergen BK	7-6	Stabæk IF	
2000	Bergen	7-6	Sagene IF	
2001	Bergen BK	13-0	Sagene IF	
2002	Bergen BK	7-5	Sagene IF	
2003	Stabæk IF	11-3	Bergen BK	
2004	Sagene IF	6-4	Bergen BK	
2005	Stabæk IF	11-5	Bergen BK	
2006	Bergen BK	7-6	Stabæk IF	
2007	Stabæk IF	6-5	Nordre Sande Idrettslag	
2008	Nordre Sande Idrettslag	8-4	IF Ready	
2009	Nordre Sande Idrettslag	4-3	Stabæk IF	
2010	Stabæk IF	7-3	Nordre Sande Idrettslag	
2011	Stabæk IF	5-4 eeo.	Nordre Sande Idrettslag/Drammen Bandy	
2012	Nordre Sande Idrettslag/Drammen Bandy	6-3	Stabæk IF	
2013	Nordre Sande Idrettslag/Drammen Bandy	7-4	Stabæk IF	
2014	Nordre Sande Idrettslag/Drammen Bandy	3-1	Stabæk IF	
2015	Nordre Sande Idrettslag/Drammen Bandy	10-4	Høvik IF	
2016	Stabæk IF	11-3	Høvik IF	
2017	Stabæk IF	3-2	Høvik IF	

== Titles ==
=== Number of titles per club ===
8 Championships

- Stabæk (1995, 2003, 2005, 2007, 2010, 2011, 2016, 2017)

6 Championships

- Hasle-Løren (1989, 1990, 1991, 1992, 1993, 1994)

5 Championships

- Bergen (1999, 2000, 2001, 2002, 2006)

4 Championships

- Nordre Sande/Drammen (2012, 2013, 2014, 2015)
- Vålerengen (1984, 1986, 1987, 1988)

3 Championships

- Høvik (1996, 1997, 1998)

2 Championships

- Nordre Sande (2008, 2009)

1 Championships

- Manglerud Star (1985)
- Sagene (2004)

=== Men's and women's titles the same year ===
Years	Club
4	Stabæk IF (1995, 2007, 2011, 2016)
