= Halfdan Ditlev-Simonsen =

Norwegian footballer, bandy player and ship-owner

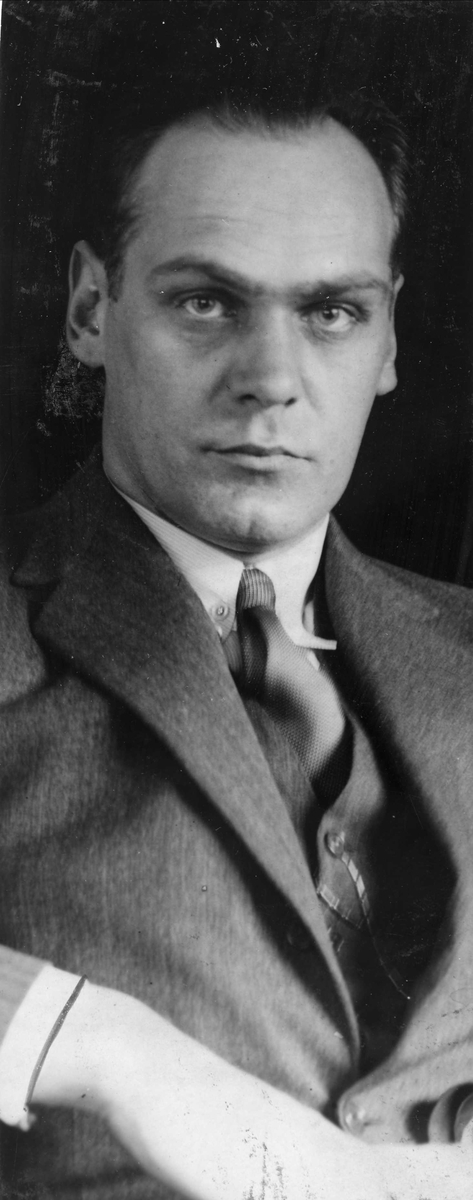
Halfdan Ditlev-Simonsen, c. 1935

Halfdan Ditlev-Simonsen (15 February 1894 – 24 February 1962) was a Norwegian multi-sportsman, sports executive and ship-owner.

== Early life ==
He was a son of ship-owner Olaf Ditlev-Simonsen. He finished secondary education in 1911, attended a mercantile school and underwent training as an average adjuster and shipbroker.

== Ship career ==
He worked as a ship-owner out of Kristiania from 1914. He was a co-owner of the company Halfdan Ditlev-Simonsen & Co. and a board member of several other ship holding companies, as well as Akers Mekaniske Verksted. He was also a board member of the Norwegian Shipowners' Association from 1928 to 1937 and the Nordisk Defence Club from 1929.

== Sporting career ==
Representing IF Ready, Ditlev-Simonsenwas capped 7 times and scored 3 goals for Norway's national football team between 1912 and 1916. He was also capped in bandy, and for IF Ready he won 13 Norwegian titles in bandy. At one point, the team comprised Halfdan Ditlev-Simonsen and his four brothers John, Olaf Christian, Sverre and Aage. He was president of Norway's Bandy Association from 1920 to 1924 and of the Norwegian Tennis Federation from 1924 to 1926. During the German occupation of Norway he was imprisoned in Grini concentration camp from January to May 1942.

Sporting positions
| Preceded by position created | President of the Norway's Bandy Association; 1920–1924 | Succeeded by Jacob Ramm |
| Preceded by | President of the Norwegian Tennis Federation; 1924–1926 | Succeeded by |
