= Norway's Bandy Association =

Governing body for bandy, floorball and field hockey in Norway

- Norges Bandyforbund (NBF)
- Logo of the federation
- Predecessor: Football Association of Norway
- Formation: 17 October 1920
- Founded at: Oslo, Norway
- Type: Governing body
- Purpose: Governing body for the sports of bandy, field hockey, and floorball
- Location: Oslo, Norway
- Region served: Norway
- Members: Federation of International Bandy (1955)
- President: Erik Hansen
- Affiliations: Federation of International Bandy, Norwegian Olympic and Paralympic Committee and Confederation of Sports
- Website: https://bandyforbundet.no/
- Formerly called: Norges Ishockeyforbund

Norway's Bandy Association (Norwegian: Norges Bandyforbund) is the governing body for the sports of bandy, floorball and field hockey in Norway.

== History ==
Norwegian bandy was originally organised by the Football Association of Norway, but an independent federation for the 'winter football' was established in 1920. In the first years, this was called Norges Ishockeyforbund, because bandy was called ishockey (ice hockey) back then, since it is a form of hockey played on ice, but when the Canadian sport of ice hockey came to Norway, the international name bandy was adopted for what was actually bandy, and the term ishockey was reserved for what now is called ice hockey. The present name Norges Bandyforbund was consequently adopted in 1929. The Norwegian bandyforbund has been pushing for bandy to be an Olympic sport, and their argument being that bandy has the second most players within winter sports behind hockey with 500000 players.

=== Presidents ===
- Halfdan Ditlev-Simonsen, Ready (1920–1924)
- Jacob Ramm, Mercantile (1924–1926)
- Aage Ditlev-Simonsen, Ready (1926–1928)
- Rolf Gjertsen, Trygg (1928–1930)
- O. Gunnulf Enger, Forward (1930–1933)
- Ivar Luytkis, Grane (1933–1934)
- Arvid Syrrist, Frigg (1934–1936)
- Thorbjørn Aspestrand, Ready (1936–1939)
- Leif Rosenqvist, Lyn (1939–1947)
- Arne Riis, B.14 (1947–1950)
- Sten Holljen, Snarøen (1950–1952)
- Einar Osmark, Drafn (1952–1954)
- Jens B. Raanaas, Mode (1954–1960)
- Bjørn Gustav Nilsen, Ready (1960–1963)
- Gunnar Jørgensen, Tåsen (1963–1972)
- Nils Ekjord, Ready (1972–1975)
- Arvid Wam, Drafn (1975–1980)
- Borgar Nygård, Skiold (1980–1982)
- Per Gunnar Løken, Røa (1982–1987)
- Arne Giving, Stabæk (1987–1991)
- Tore Krarup, Hasle-Løren (1991–1996)
- Kjell Hovland Olsen, Sparta/Bragerøen (1996–2006)
- Ivar Nordberg, Holmlia (2006–2012)
- Erik Hansen, Skeid (2012– )

== Sports ==
=== Bandy ===
Bandy was originally governed through a committee in the Football Association of Norway. The national bandy association was founded on 17 October 1920 as Norges Ishockeyforbund, but the sport played was bandy, not what now is known as ice hockey. The founding clubs were Drafn, Drammen IF, Frigg, Hasle, Kjapp-Rjukan, Mercantile, Rapp-Trondheim, Ready and Trygg. The first president was Halfdan Ditlev-Simonsen. The association changed names to the present name Norges Bandyforbund in 1929.

Norway's Bandy Association was one of the founding members of the Federation of International Bandy in 1955.

National teams:

- Norway national bandy team
- Norway women's national bandy team

=== Field hockey ===
Field hockey in Norway is governed through a certain section of the association: Landhockeyseksjon, Norges Bandyforbund. The association is a member of the International Hockey Federation. It governs the men's national team.

=== Floorball ===
The association organise floorball as the Norwegian Floorball Federation since 1988. It organises the men's and women's national teams and the Norwegian Floorball Eliteserie. By January 1, 2007 there are 6843 registered players in Norway.

The association joined International Floorball Federation in 1991.
