= Kristiania Hockeyklub =

Former bandy club in Norway

Kristiania Hockeyklub, usually called just Hockeyklubben ("The Hockey Club"), was founded in 1903 and was the first bandy club in Norway. It was based in Oslo, which at the time was called Kristiania.

The club dominated Norwegian bandy during the first years the sport was played in the country. Hockeyklubben was playing the final of the Norwegian Championship in the first two years a national championship was played in bandy, in 1912 and 1913, however losing to IF Ready on both occasions, the second time on a walkover. The club was discontinued in 1915.

== Sources ==
- K. Vilh. Amundsen, Yngvar Bryn og Halfdan Ditlev-Simonsen (1922). Idrætsboken, Bind III Skiløpning, skøiteløpning, ishockey. Kristiania: H. Aschehoug & Co.
- Andersen, Peder Chr. (1927). Norges Fotballforbund gjennem 25 år. Oslo.
