= Bislett Stadium =

Stadium at Oslo, Norway

Bislett stadion
- Lekegrinda (old stadium)
- Interactive map of Bislett stadion
- Location: Bislett; 0168 Oslo
- Coordinates: 59°55′29″N 10°44′2″E
- Owner: Oslo Municipality
- Operator: Oslo Municipality
- Capacity: 15,400 (Athletics, football)
- Surface: Grass

Construction
- Groundbreaking: 1917
- Opened: 1922
- Cost: €55 Million (Euros)
- Architect: C. F. Møller Architects

Tenants
- Vålerenga Fotball (1944–1999); Skeid Fotball (2007–2012); Lyn Fotball (2010, 2014-present)

Bislett Stadium (Norwegian: Bislett stadion) is a sports stadium in Oslo, Norway. Bislett is Norway's most well known sports arena internationally, with 15 speed skating world records and more than 50 track and field world records having been set here. The original stadium was demolished in 2004 and construction of a new stadium was completed by the summer of 2005. The New Bislett Stadium was designed by C.F. Møller Architects.

== History ==
Bislett Stadium lies on the site of a 19th-century brick works, which was bought by the Municipality of Kristiania (Oslo) in 1898, and turned into a sports field in 1908. The merchant, speed skater, gymnast and sports organizer Martinus Lørdahl was instrumental in facilitating the construction of the first bleachers, begun in 1917 and completed in 1922 along with the new club house. One of the squares outside the stadium is named Martinus Lørdahl's Square, in his honour. Bislett became Norway's main arena for speed skating and track and field in 1940 when the architect Frode Rinnan's new functionalistic stadium was completed, with a capacity of 20,000. Rinnan was also responsible for the renovation of the stadium for the 1952 Winter Olympic Games in Oslo. At those games, the stadium hosted some of the figure skating and the speed skating events. Bislett has hosted the Bislett Games since 1965, an annual track and field event in the IAAF Golden League (from 2010: the Diamond League). The venue hosted the Norwegian Athletics Championships 18 times, in 1926–29, 1931–36, 1938–39, 1947, 1949, 1951–52, 1955 and 2006.

== New stadium ==
Bislett's career as a speed skating venue ended in 1988, when it was decided that ice production would discontinue, even though the stadium did not meet international requirements for any other sport. The stadium was quickly becoming run down and even dangerous, but it would take more than decade of debate before the city council decided that Bislett was to be demolished and rebuilt. Especially the matter of whether or not Bislett would continue to host speed skating events provided tensions between the various parties involved, leaving nostalgics disappointed when it turned out not to be so. Speed skating has increasingly become an indoor sport and providing the famous record breaking ice would no longer be possible if the stadium was to be optimized for athletics and football. The old Bislett was appreciated for its architecture and its atmosphere, not to mention its illustrious record history, and it was perhaps then a fitting gesture that the new stadium was built in record breaking time – construction lasted only ten months. The new stadium designed by Danish architecture practice C. F. Møller Architects was inaugurated with the Bislett Games on 29 July 2005.

The New Bislett Stadium meets international requirements for track and field events. The running track now has eight lanes with a 37.5 m turning radius (the previous stadium only had six lanes, forcing the Bislett Games organizers to install temporary lanes on the long stretch for the 100 m event). The track has received a 1st class certification by World Athletics, shared by only a handful other stadiums in Northern Europe. In addition, there is an indoor running track beneath the stands for warming up and for indoor workouts during the winter, and the construction of an underground sports hall is under consideration. The new turning radius has provided space for a 105 m × 68 m football pitch, and the stadium currently meets national requirements for hosting football matches in the Norwegian Premier League.

== Speed skating ==
The World Speed Skating Championships were held at Bislett for the first time in 1925, but it was not until 1940 that Bislett became the main venue for speed skating in Oslo. Since then one unofficial World Championship event right before the start of World War II and 11 more official World Championships have been held here, from 1947 to 1983. Bislett has also hosted ten European Championships, with the last one being held in 1986. Norwegian speed skaters Hjalmar Andersen, Knut Johannesen, Fred Anton Maier and Kay Stenshjemmet have all become European Champions at Bislett.

The largest speed skating event at Bislett was that of the 1952 Olympics. Hjalmar Andersen won three gold medals.

Despite its low-lying altitude, Bislett was on many occasions able to provide ice of a high quality, resulting in ten single distance world records and five overall world records. In 1963, Knut Johannesen broke Boris Shilkov's eight-year-old 5000 m world record from Medeo, with the time 7:37.8. Jonny Nilsson improved the record by around four seconds during the World Championships in 1965. Fred Anton Maier was able to set a 10000 m world record here twice, in 1966 and in 1968. Bislett has seen an additional two 10000 m records, and both times the record was snatched back from Medeo. Sten Stensen set a time of 14:50.31 during the European Championships in 1976. Tomas Gustafson's 14:23.59 from 1982 was Bislett's final speed skating world record.

The European Championships in 1986 proved to be the last major speed skating event at Bislett, as ice production was halted two years later.

== Bandy ==
When bandy was a demonstration sport at the 1952 Winter Olympics, one match was played at Bislett.

Also national finals used to be played.

== Speedway ==
The venue hosted significant motorcycle speedway events as early as 1940. It staged the European Final, which was a qualification round of the Speedway World Championship in 1955 and 1956.

== Football ==
Football has been played at Bislett since the early days of the sports field, and the first international game was played here in 1913, between Norway and Sweden. At this time there were no bleachers, but the match still drew a crowd of 10,000. The match ended in a 1–1 draw.

Bislett was Vålerenga I.F.'s home ground for 55 seasons. The club's attendance record was set here in 1962 and was not beaten until 2004. The club won its first four league championships while playing at Bislett, which earned the nickname "Leikegrinda" (The playground). After years of neglect by the authorities the stadium was in such bad shape that from the middle of the 90s Vålerenga were no longer allowed to play there. After a spell at Ullevaal Stadium the club moved back to Bislett, if only for a short time, and it is unlikely that they will ever return. Vålerenga went on to play their home matches on Ullevaal from 1999 to 2017.

After the new stadium was completed interest in playing football there on a top level has been mediocre. Both Vålerenga and rivals FK Lyn have been offered to play their home matches there free of charge, but both teams were reluctant to play at what is now primarily a track and field stadium. The stadium is considered to be very intimate for track and field events, but not necessarily for football. Spectators are seated far back from the pitch and due to the stadium's shape half the seats are located at the ends of the pitch. The main stand does not have a permanent roof and of the 15,400 capacity only 3,000 seats are covered. Lyn was the last team to reject a deal with the municipality over Bislett, in 2005, and instead they continued to play at Ullevaal, their home ground for the past 80 years. After several years of financial troubles, Lyn finally accepted an offer to play at Bislett in 2010, but ultimately declared bankruptcy during the season, resigned from the Norwegian league, and were liquidated shortly thereafter.

Although the two top teams in Oslo have declined to use Bislett as their home ground they have still shown some interest in playing there during the winter, in the Scandinavian club tournament known as Royal League. In addition, the 1st division (second level in the Norwegian pyramid) club Manglerud Star Oslo played their home games here in the 2006 season, before being relegated to the 2nd division. In 2007 it became the home ground of Skeid, promoted back to the 1st division after one season in the 2nd division, their ground at Voldsløkka not being up to standards for 1st division play. Although Skeid were relegated back to the 2nd division after the 2009 season, they still use Bislett as their home ground.

== Rugby union ==
The Norway national rugby union team occasionally plays their matches at the stadium.

== Rugby league ==
The final of the rugby league Nordic Cup between Scandinavian nations was played at the stadium, between Norway and Denmark in August 2012.

== Gallery ==
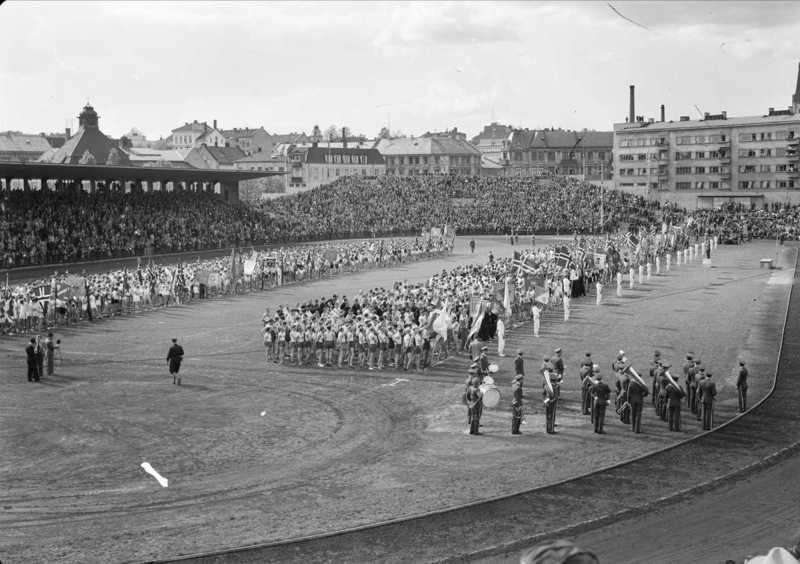
Bislett Stadium in 1946

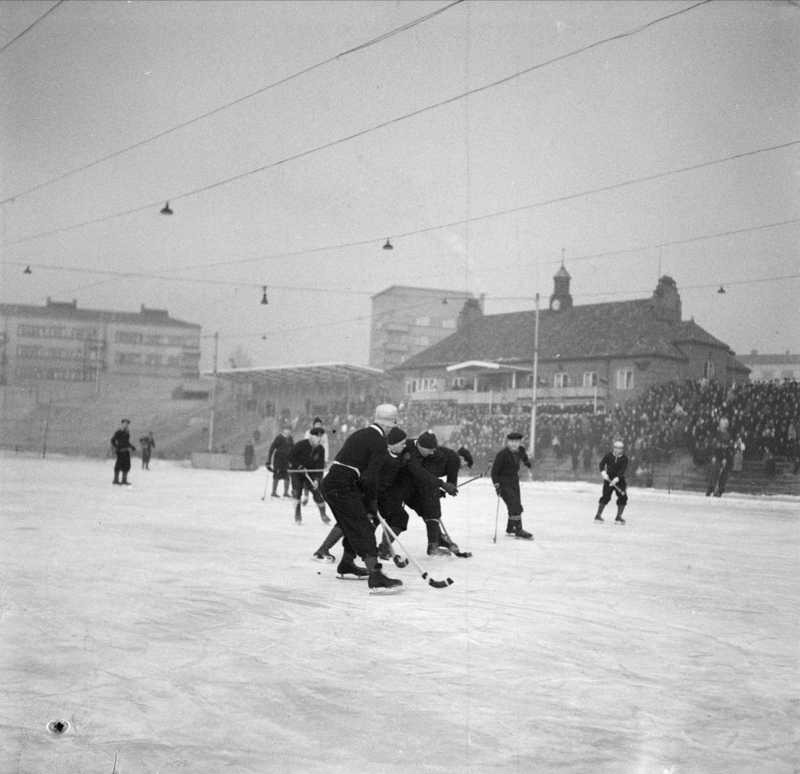
Mjøndalen IF beating Frigg Oslo 3–1 in the national bandy final of 1947

The main entrance

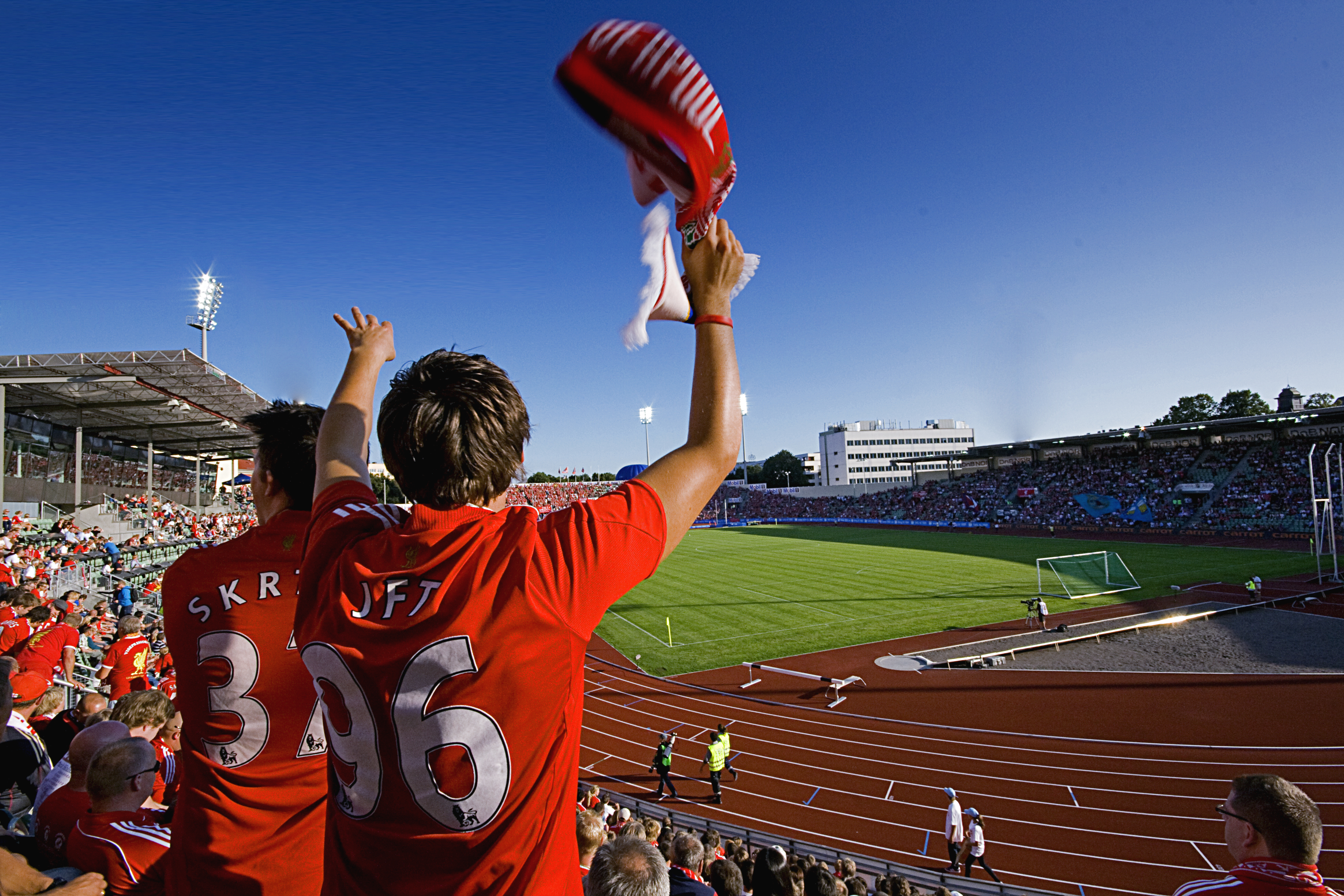
Friendly Match Lyn vs Liverpool in 2009
