= Jacob Ramm =

Norwegian footballer (1890–1982)

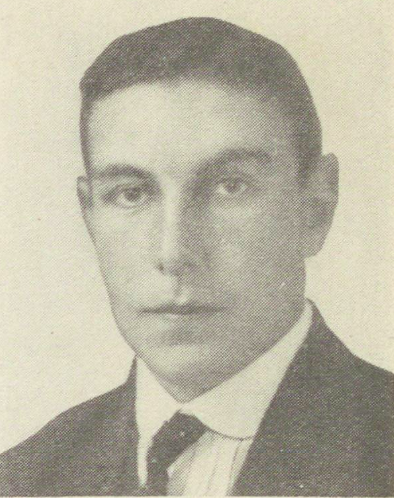
- Ramm in the mid 1920s
- Born: 18 November 1890; Kristiania, Norway
- Died: 31 October 1982 (aged 91)
- Occupation: dentist

Jacob Ramm (18 November 1890 – 31 October 1982) was a Norwegian dentist and organizational leader.

He was born in Kristiania to wholesaler Herman Ramson and Klara Schattenstein. He graduated as dentist in 1914, and practiced as dentist in Kristiania (later Oslo) as well as a period in Rjukan.

He was appointed secretary and eventually secretary general for the dentists' trade union, Den norske tannlegeforening.

He was an active bandy and football player, and served as president of both the Norway's Bandy Association and the Football Association of Norway. He was decorated Knight, First Class of the Order of St. Olav in 1951.

== Selected works ==
- Den norske tannlægeforening gjennom 75 år
- Skandinavisk Tannlegeforening gjennom 100 år

Sporting positions
Preceded by Halfdan Ditlev-Simonsen	President of the Norway's Bandy Association; 1924–1926	Succeeded by Aage Ditlev-Simonsen
Preceded by Daniel Eie	President of the Football Association of Norway; 1928–1929	Succeeded by Per Skou
