= Marienlyst Stadion =

Football stadium in Drammen, Norway

Marienlyst stadion
- Gamle Gress
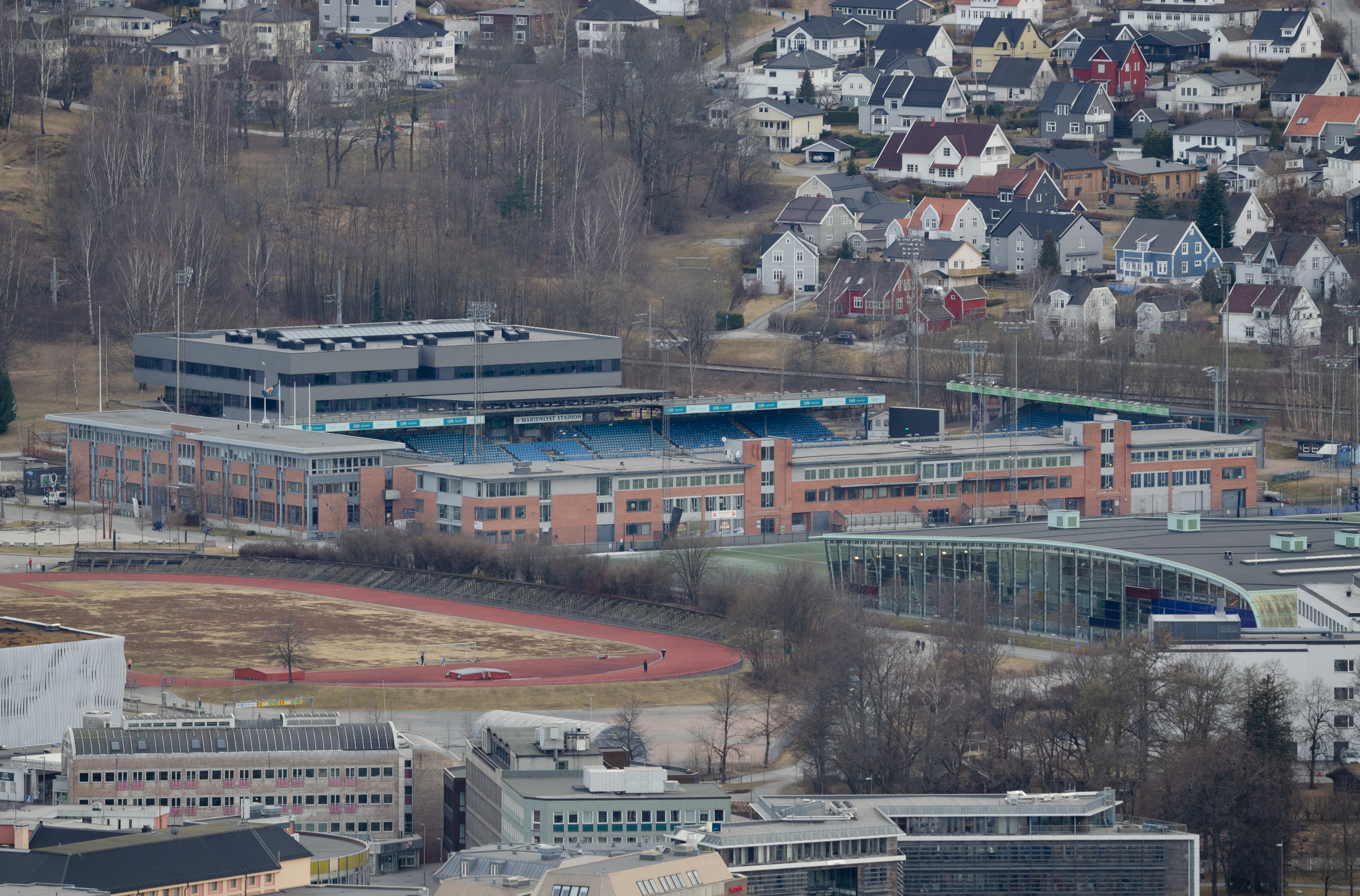
- Interactive map of Marienlyst stadion
- Location: Drammen, Norway
- Coordinates: 59°44′04″N 10°12′05″E
- Owner: Drammen Municipality
- Operator: Drammen Municipality
- Capacity: 8,935
- Surface: Artificial grass
- Record attendance: 17,300 (1947)
- Field size: 106 × 68 m

Construction
- Groundbreaking: 1923
- Opened: 1924

Tenants
- Strømsgodset Toppfotball (1967–present); SBK Drafn (1924–present)

The Marienlyst Stadion has been the home ground of Strømsgodset Toppfotball since 1967. It is located on Marienlyst in Drammen, Norway.

== History ==
The pitch was opened in 1924, and was the home ground of Drafn, Skiold and Drammens BK. The final of the 1932 Norwegian Football Cup, between Fredrikstad and Ørn was played at Marienlyst. During the 1952 Winter Olympics in neighboring Oslo, the venue hosted two ice hockey matches.

The venue hosted the Norwegian Athletics Championships in 1962 and 2001 and also hosted motorcycle speedway around the pitch, when it held the final of the Norwegian Individual Speedway Championship in 1962.

The Norway national under-21 football team has played eighteen games Marienlyst, making it their most-used venue. The first under-21 match was played in 1981.

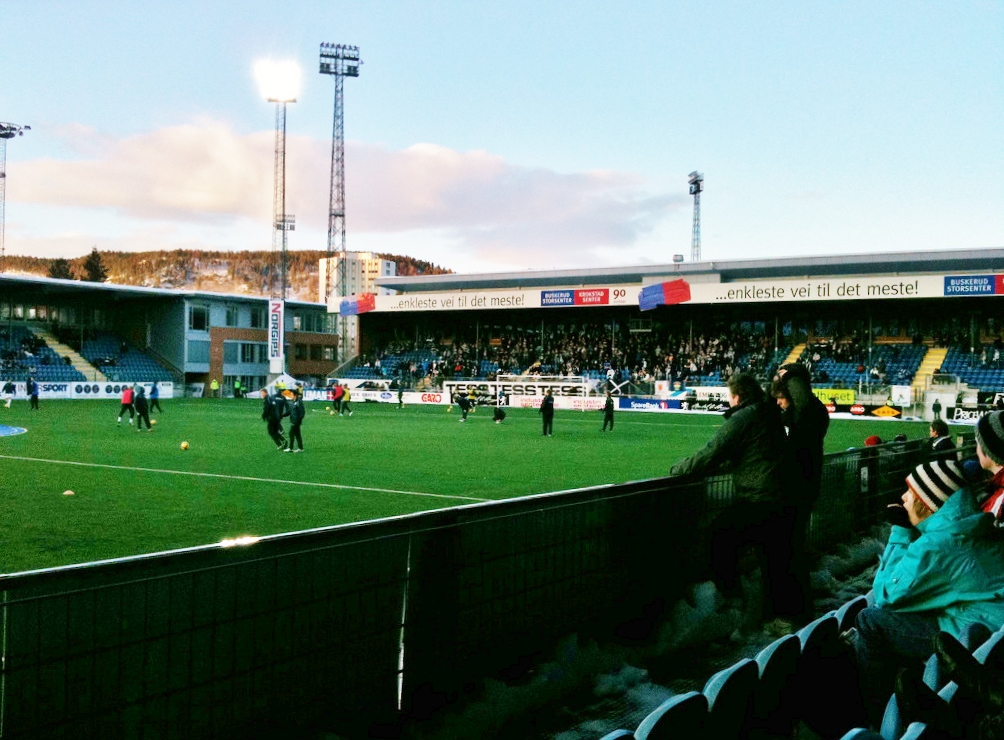
Marienlyst prior to Strømsgodset's opening game of the season against Kongsvinger in 2010.

After a rebuild of the south end in 2014, and installation of safe standing seats, the stadium has a capacity of 8,935. When using the seats, the capacity is 8,060. The rebuild was done to ensure that the stadium would fulfill UEFA's regulations for a Category 4 stadium, which can be used for all Champions League or Europa League matches except the final.

The grass was removed in November 2007 to make way for artificial ice surface for winter sports, and artificial grass for summer sports. A new stadium was planned, but the project was abandoned due to financial difficulties. There are new plans to expand and rebuild the main stand. In a 2012 survey carried out by the Norwegian Players' Association among away-team captains, Marienlyst was ranked third-worst amongst league stadiums, with a score of 2.13 on a scale from one to five. This was mainly due to the worn-out artificial turf, which was replaced in the summer of 2013. It is due to be replaced again in 2024.

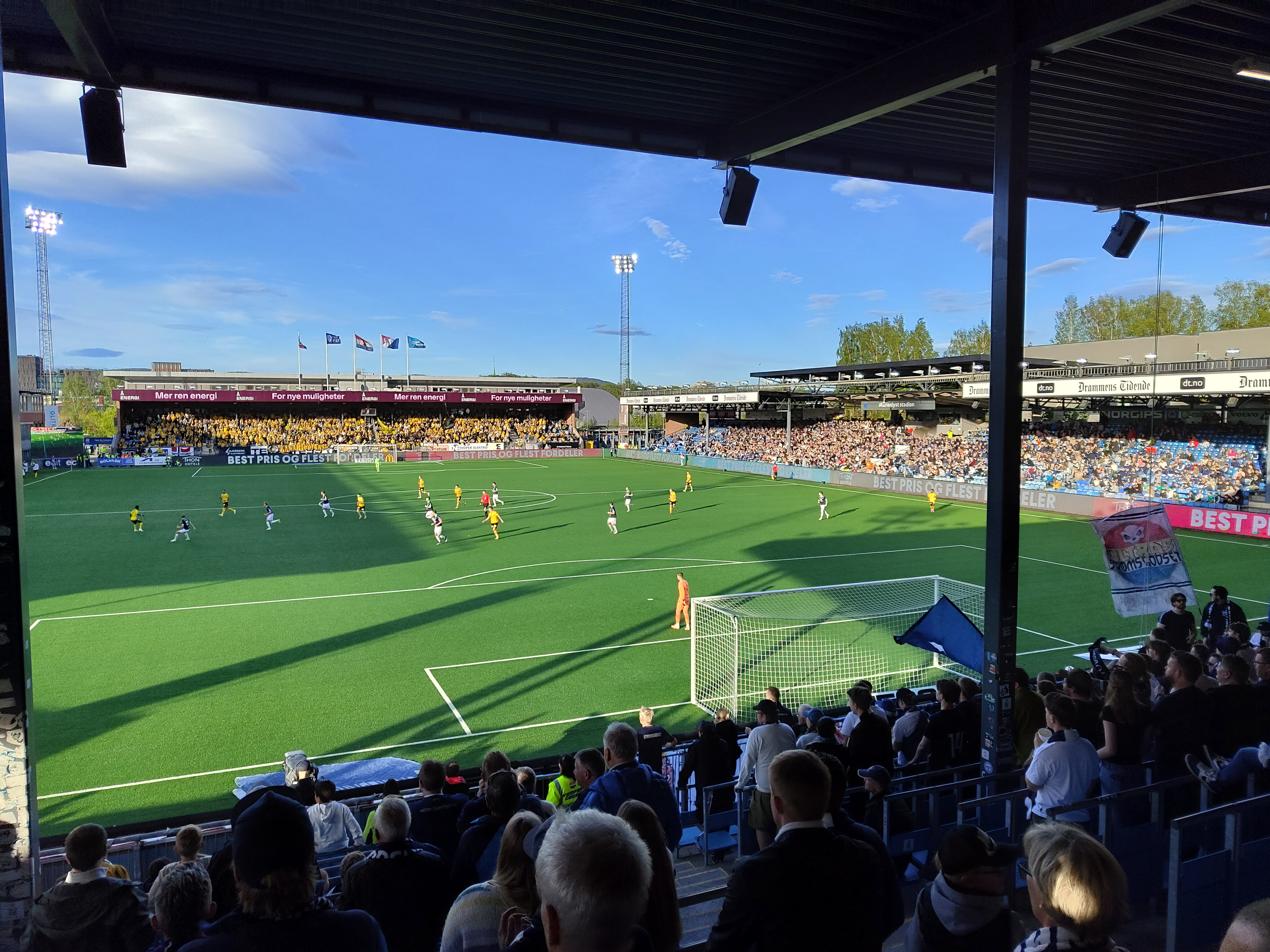
Marienlyst during the cup game between Strømsgodset and Lillestrøm on 9 May 2024. Taken from the south stand.

The Gamle Gress (old Turf) is part of a sport complex, with the adjacent bandy field (artificial ice) and the athletics stadium next door as well as the sports hall for indoor athletics and handball.

== Attendance ==
The record attendance is 17,300 when Mjøndalen met Viking in the semifinal of the 1947 Norwegian Football Cup. Strømsgodset's record attendance is from 22 May 1969, when 16,687 people attended the home match against Rosenborg.

=== Strømsgodset's league attendances ===
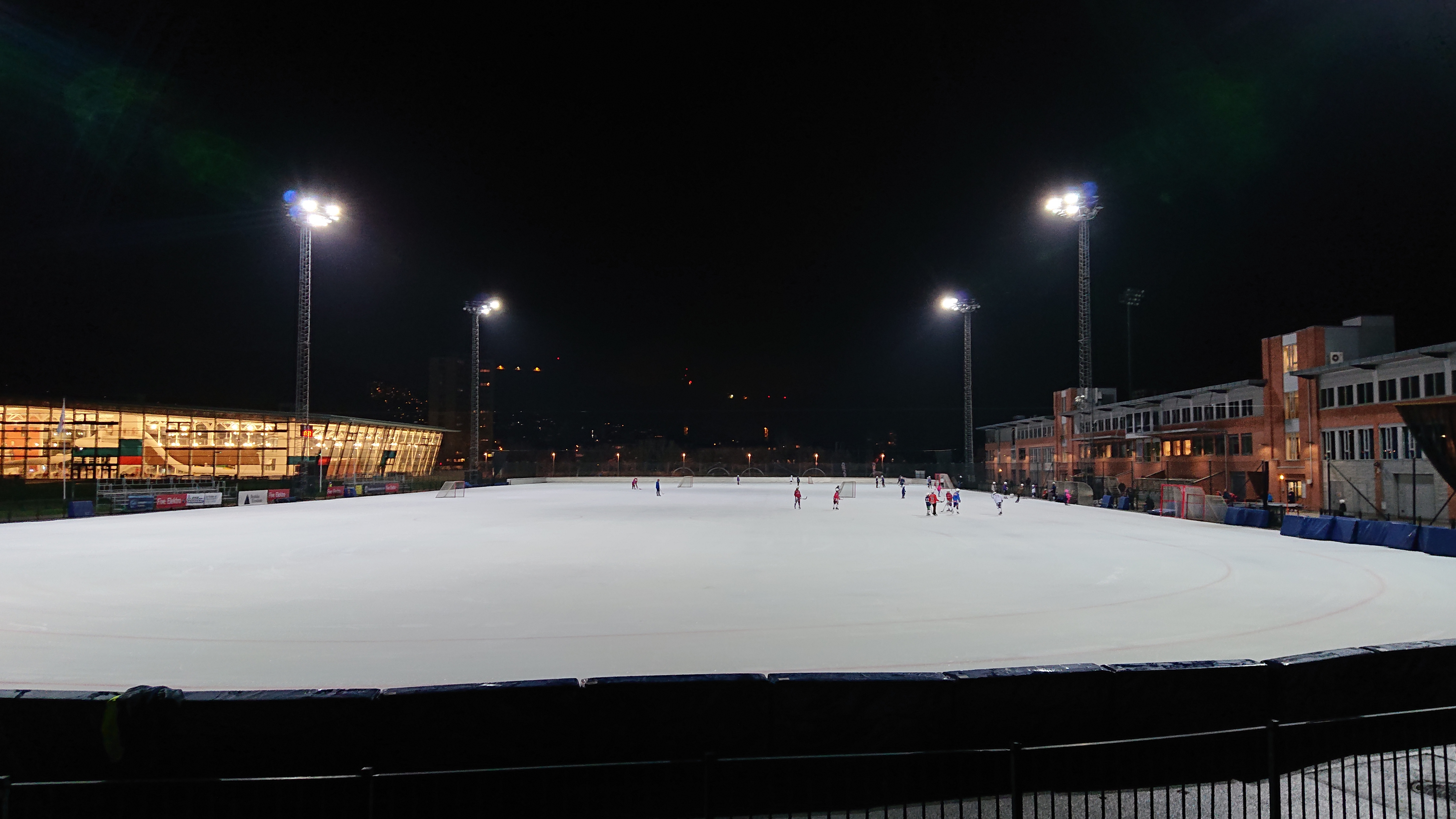
This photo, facing north, shows the artificial ice field in the Marienlyst stadium complex in Drammen, Norway. During summer, the cover is artificial turf for soccer. On the left, Drammensbadet swimming hall. On the right, the western part of Marienlyst stadium, which also houses the wardrobe section and garage for the ice field.

This lists Strømsgodsets's most recent average league home attendances at Marienlyst. It also lists minimum and maximum league homeattendances from each season.

	Eliteserien
†	1. divisjon

League attendances
Season	Avg.	Min.	Max.	Rank	Ref
2006	4,076	1,958	8,025	2†	
2007	6,808	5,347	8,198	10	
2008	5,915	4,785	7,539	10	
2009	5,355	3,897	7,387	13	
2010	5,857	4,760	7,444	11	
2011	5,707	5,052	6,426	12	
2012	6,101	4,726	7,451	8	
2013	6,526	5,175	7,544	7	
2014	6,708	5,861	7,720	8	
2015	7,030	6,180	8,468	6	
2016	6,826	6,095	7,661	7	
2017	6,272	5,575	7,706	7	
2018	5,939	5,199	7,587	5	
