= SK Frem-31 =

Norwegian sports club

Home colours

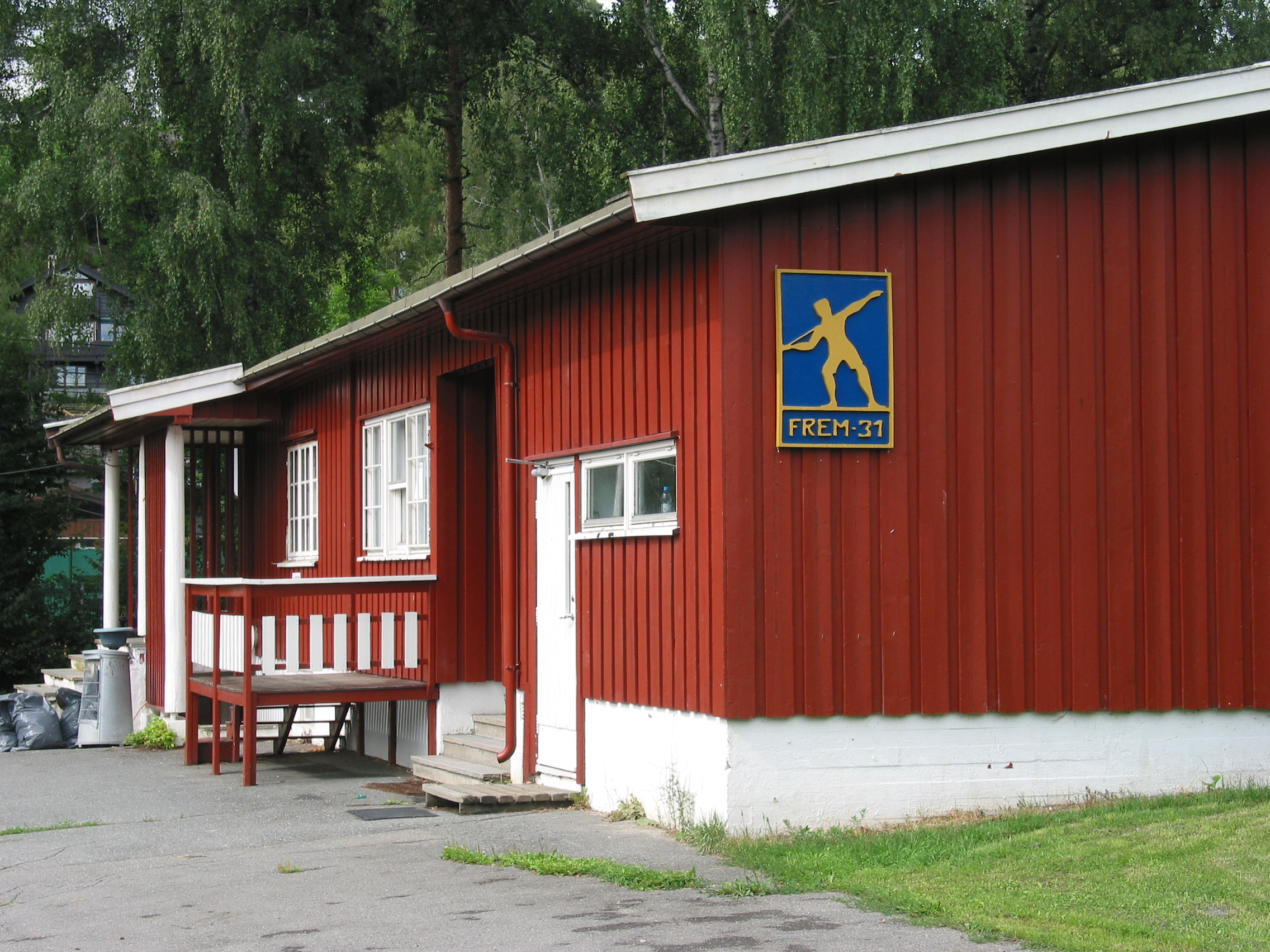
Their official clubroom.

Sportsklubben Frem-31 is a Norwegian sports club from Lysaker, Bærum which was founded on 23 January 1931. The club has sections for bandy, association football and handball.

The men's bandy team last played in the Premier League in the 1996–97 season.
