= Norwegian Floorball Eliteserie =

Norwegian floorball league

Norwegian Floorball Eliteserie is the highest floorball league for men in Norway. Slevik are the current defending champions, having won the 2022/23 championship after beating Tunet in the play off final.

== History ==
The league was founded in 1994 under the name Eliteserien ("Elite Series"). The inaugural teams were Greåker, Holmlia, Kverneland, Nor-92, Sola, Strømmen and Tunet. League play commenced on 1 October 1994. Floorball and golf were Norway's largest growing sports at the time.

== Season structure ==
The season starts with a regular season with 22 matches per team, one home and one away against all teams. In the spring a play-off starts with the eight best teams from the regular season. The final is played in a random arena together with the women's Eliteserien final.

== Current clubs ==
- Sarpsborg
- Greåker
- Fjerdingby
- Sveiva
- Slevik
- Gjelleråsen
- Akerselva
- Nor 92
- Harstad
- Tunet
- Vålerenga
- Ullensaker/Kisa IL
- Sandnes
