= Konnerud IL =

Norwegian sports club

Konnerud IL Fotball
- Full name: Konnerud Idrettslag
- Founded: 1927
- Ground: Konnerud stadion, Drammen
- League: Fourth Division
Home colours

Konnerud Idrettslag (Konnerud Sports Club) is a Norwegian sports club from Drammen, Buskerud. It has sections for association football, team handball, volleyball, bandy, Nordic skiing, cycling, and orienteering.

It was founded in 1927 as a skiing club. Football was added in 1930, handball in 1946, orienteering in 1953, bandy in 1980, volleyball in 1984 and cycling in 2007. The club formerly had sections for athletics from 1930 to 1992, tennis from 1985 to 1992 and judo from 1990 to 1998. The skiing section also formerly encompassed alpine skiing; the 1952 Olympian Johnny Lunde represented the club.

The men's football team currently plays in the Fourth Division, the fifth tier of Norwegian football. It last played in the Norwegian Third Division in 2010. The women's football team plays in the Second Division.

The men's bandy team played in the Premier League in the seasons 2017–18 and 2018–19.

The skiing sport is often considered as the most important sport in the club, every year the club hosts a World Cup race in downtown Drammen.
