= Bergen Bandyklubb =

Norwegian bandy club

Bergen Bandyklubb is a Norwegian bandy club, founded in 1936 and based in Bergen. The club has won the national championship for women in 1999, 2000, 2001, 2002, and 2006.
