= Nordre Sande IL =

Norwegian sports club

Home colours

Nordre Sande Idrettslag is a Norwegian sports club from Klevjer, Vestfold which was founded in 1931. The club has sections for bandy, association football, volleyball and Nordic skiing.

The women's bandy team plays in the Premier League, and became champions in the 2011–2012 season. The men's bandy team plays in the First Division, the second tier.

The men's football team plays in the Fourth Division, the fifth tier of Norwegian football.
