= SBK Drafn =

Norwegian sports club

Home colours

Ski- og Ballklubben Drafn is a Norwegian multi-sports club from Drammen, founded in 1910.

The club, which takes its name from the Norse name of Drammen, was founded as a merger of the clubs Ulf (founded 1905) and Njord (founded 1906). In 1916 it incorporated the skiing club Drammen SK (founded 1881).

The men's bandy team won the Norwegian national championship 19 times. It was one of the founding members of Norway's Bandy Association in 1920. The men's bandy team folded in 1997, merging into Drammen Bandy.

The club also has sections for association football and skiing. The skiers Thorleif Haug, Olympic Champion, Oscar Gjøslien, Henry Gjøslien and 1950 World Ski Jumping Champion Hans Bjørnstad represented the club.

The men's football team contested the 1927 Norwegian Football Cup final. The team currently plays in the Fifth Division, the sixth tier of Norwegian football.
