= Drammen Bandy =

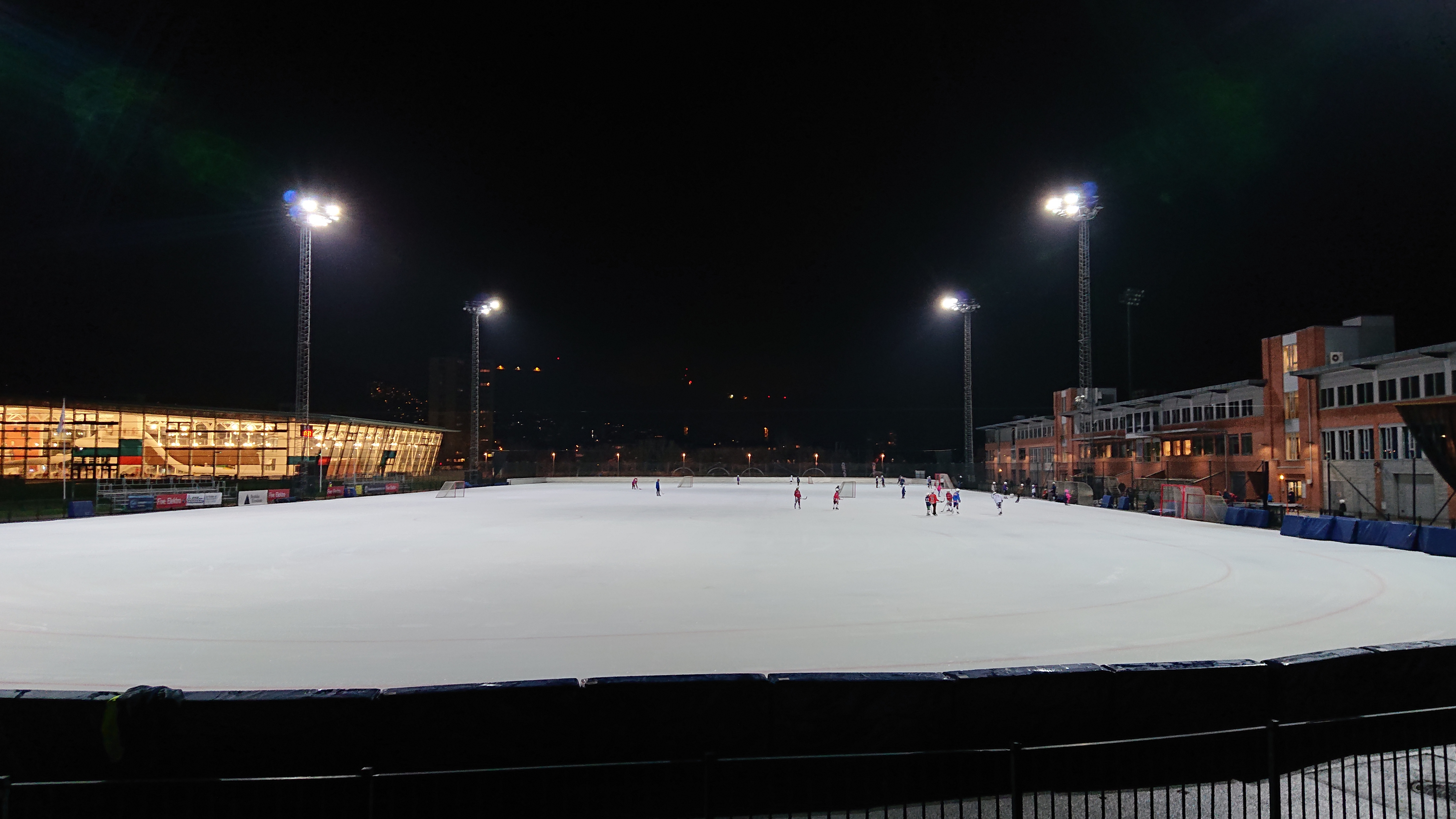
- Founded: 1997
- Ground: Marienlyst Kunstis
- Capacity: 1000
- Chairman: Julie Nålby
- Manager: Ove Ronny Nørgaard
- League: Norwegian Bandy Premier League

Drammen Bandy is a bandy club from Drammen, Norway, formed on 16 June 1997 as a cooperation between several teams in the city.

== History ==
The clubs which handed over their bandy activities to Drammen Bandy when it was founded, were

- SK Drafn,
- Drammens Ballklubb,
- SBK Skiold,
- Strømsgodset IF,
- Sparta/Bragerøen,
- Konnerud IL

== Current activities ==
Drammen Bandy play in the Norwegian Bandy Premier League. Their current head coach is Ove Ronny Nørgaard.

In a joint venture with Nordre Sande IL, Drammen Bandy has won the Norwegian Championship for women in 2012, 2013, 2014, and 2015.
