= Sarpsborg BK =

Bandy club in Sarpsborg, Norway

Sarpsborg Bandyklubb are a bandy club from Sarpsborg, Norway, formed on 14 June 1989.

They have finished in lowly positions in the Premier League in recent seasons. They have only competed in a major international tournament once since the turn of the century when they finished bottom of their group, where there three opponents were Swedish clubs Sandvikens AIK, IFK Vänersborg and BS BolticGöta in the Bandy World Cup in the 2003-04 season.
