= Ullevål IL =

Sports club in Oslo, Norway

- Logo.
- Full name: Ullevål Idrettslag
- Sport: bandy, gymnastics, earlier also alpine skiing, association football, Nordic skiing, track and field athletics, tennis
- Founded: 31 January 1892
- Based in: Oslo, Norway

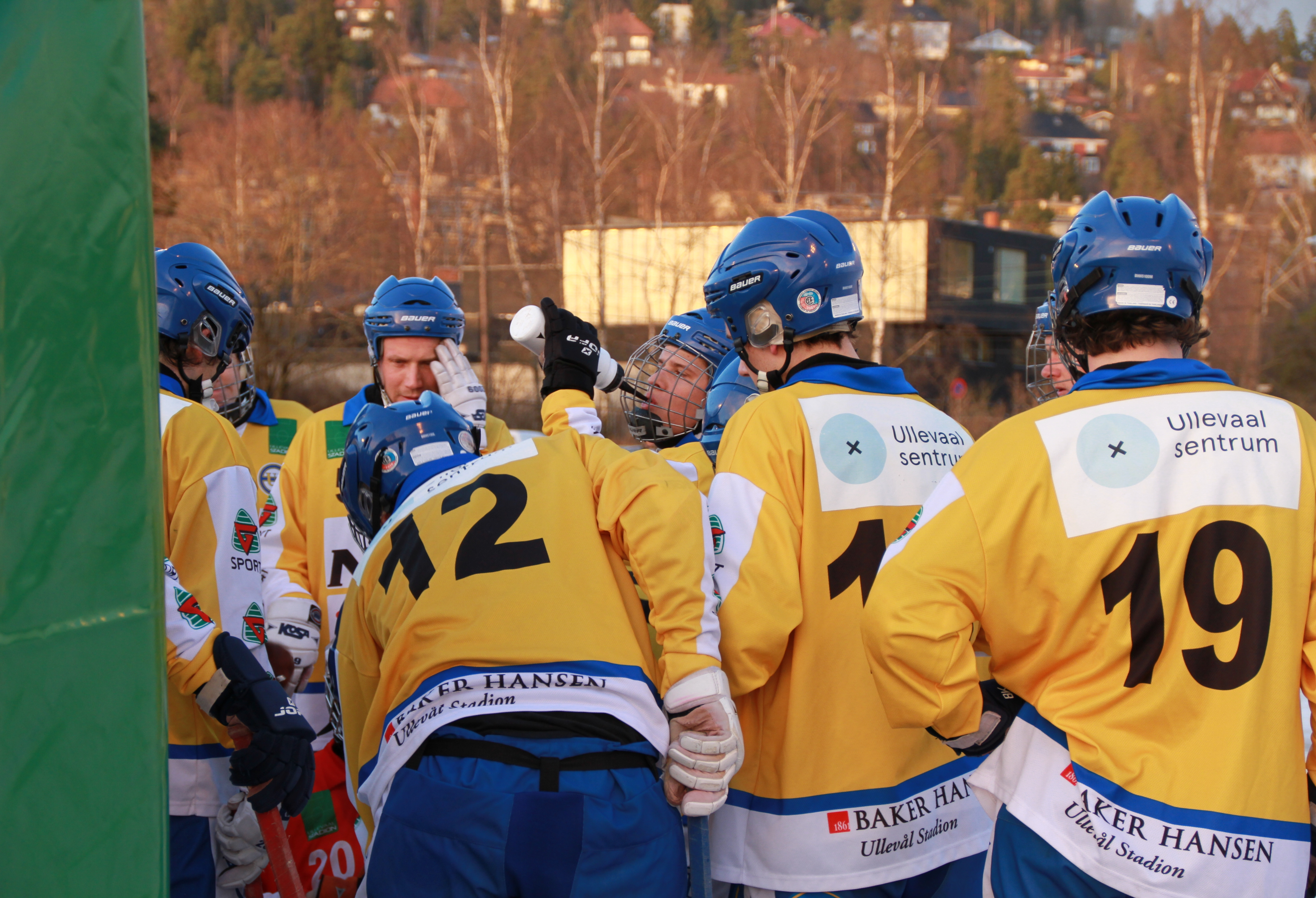
Ullevål bandy team

Ullevål Idrettslag is a Norwegian sports club from Oslo. The club currently has sections for bandy and gymnastics.

It was founded on 5 July 1920 with the name Kvik. It was founded as an association football club, and expanded with tennis, gymnastics, track and field, Nordic skiing and alpine skiing before 1929. In 1934 bandy was added. Football, gymnastics, skiing and track gradually disappeared.

The men's bandy team has played in the Norwegian Premier League since 2000–01. Its home field is Bergbanen, located adjacent to Ullevål stadion. The men's bandy team won the national championships in 1974, 1975, 1978 and 2013.
