= Solberg SK =

Norwegian sports club

- Solberg SK club logo
- Full name: Solberg Sportsklubb
- Sport: association football, bandy, handboll, track and field athletics, earlier also skiing
- Founded: 26 November 1929
- Based in: Solbergelva, Norway

Solberg Sportsklubb is a Norwegian sports club from Solbergelva which was founded in 1929. The club has sections for football, bandy, handball and gymnastics.

Its local rivals are Mjøndalen and Birkebeineren.

== Bandy section ==
Solberg play in the Norwegian Bandy Premier League, have won the national championships several times and lost the final in 2016.

== Football section ==
Solberg SK
| Home colours | Away colours |

The football team plays in the Third Division, the fourth tier of Norwegian football. In 1952, the club made it to the Norwegian championship final-game.
