= IF Ready =

Norwegian omnisports club in Oslo

- Full name: Idrettsforeningen Ready
- Sport: Alpine skiing, ski jumping, bandy, football, track and field athletics, handball, floorball, cross-country skiing
- Founded: 14 June 1907; 119 years ago
- Based in: Oslo, Norway

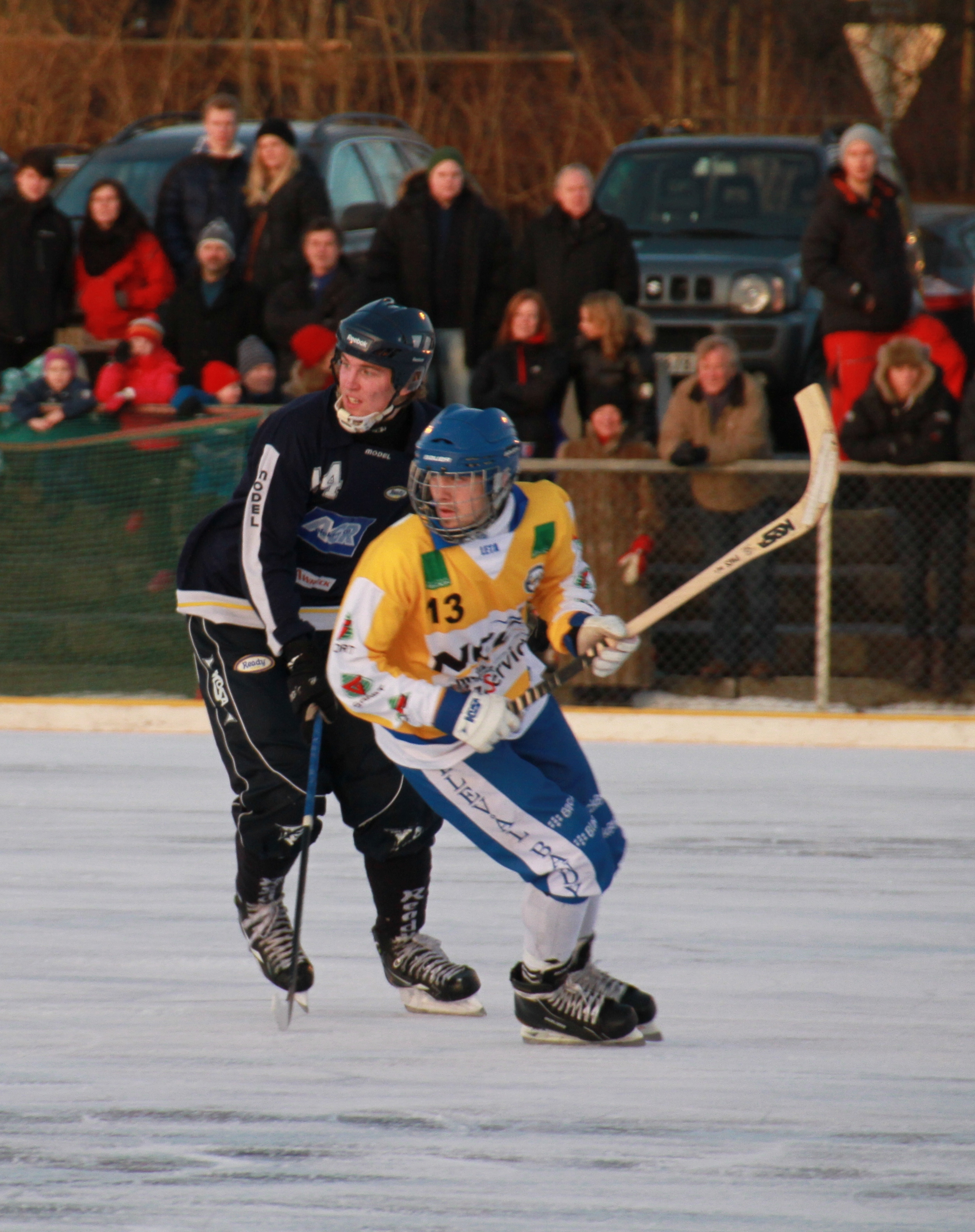
IF Ready in black

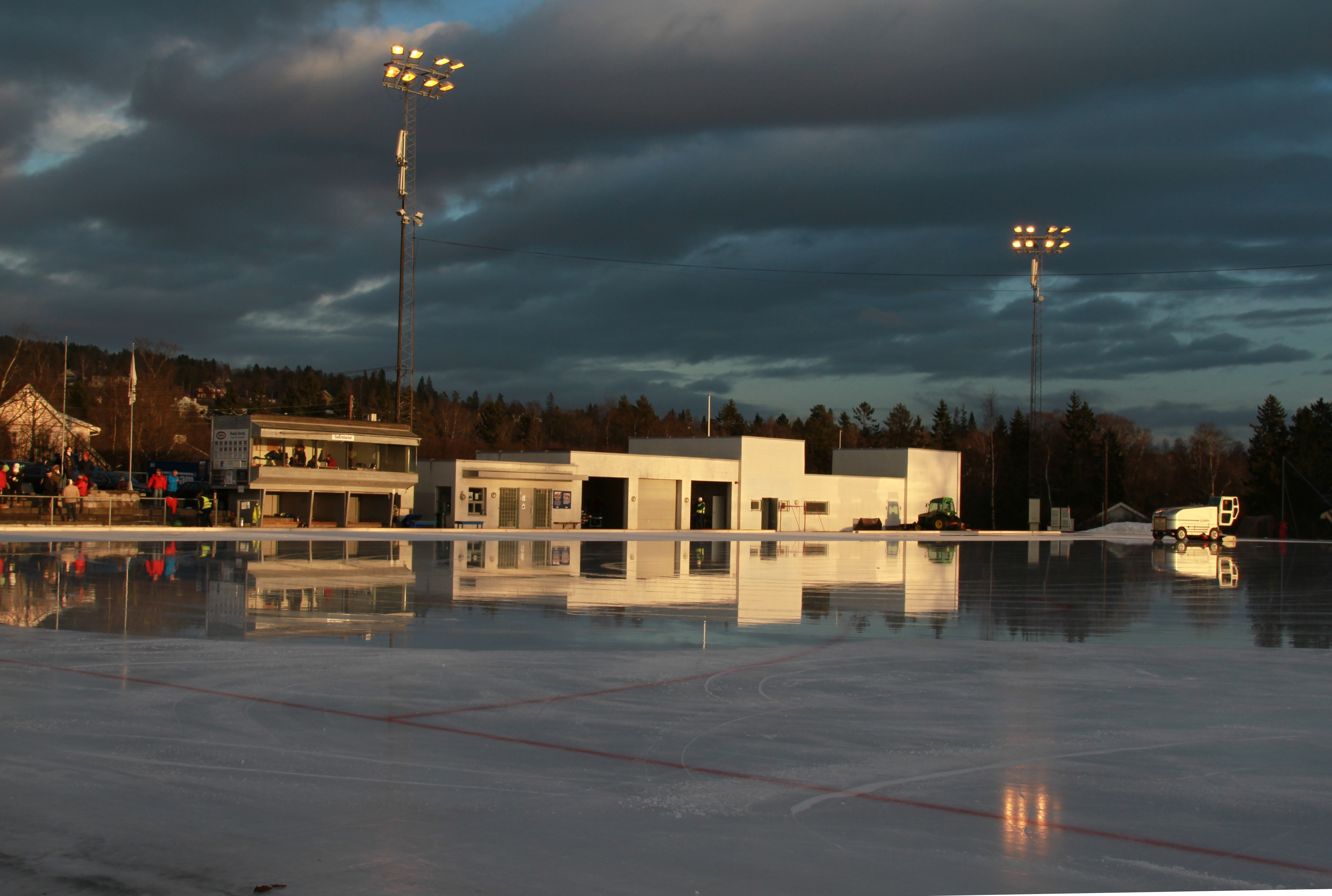
Home ice

Idrettsforeningen Ready is a sports club in Vestre Aker, Oslo, Norway. The club was established on June 14, 1907 by Aage Blom Lorentzen.

== Overview ==
The football club plays their home games at Gressbanen in Oslo. Gressbanen was the arena for the Norway national team before Ullevaal was constructed in 1928. Former Norwegian international Dan Eggen has played for Ready.

Ready's elite bandy team started playing in the Norwegian Bandy Premier League 2004–05, where they remain. The club has 14 Norwegian championships; the last one in 2015 after having won their 13th championship in 1927.

Captain of the national bandy team and twice man of the year in Norwegian bandy, Christian Waaler, plays for the team. He later attempted to bring bandy to the Philippines. The club's female bandy team had five international players for Norway.

Ski jumper Jon Aaraas is also a member of the club.
