= Stabæk Bandy =

- Founded: 1912 (age 113–114)

Stabæk Bandy is the bandy section of Stabæk IF, a Norwegian sports club from Stabekk/Bekkestua in Bærum, founded in 1912.

== Squad ==
As of 20 October 2021

Note: Flags indicate national team as defined under FIB eligibility rules. Players may hold more than one non-FIB nationality.

No.	Pos.	Nation	Player
1	GK	(Norway) NOR	Marius Lerø
5	DF	(Norway) NOR	Jon Harstad Brækken (jr)
6	MF	(Norway) NOR	Petter Løyning
8	MF	(Norway) NOR	Magnus Høgvold
9	MF	(Norway) NOR	Nikolai Jensen (captain)
10	FW	(Sweden) SWE	Björn Buskqvist
12	GK	(Norway) NOR	Håkon Lysfjord Pettersen (jr)
17	MF	(Norway) NOR	Andreas Killingstad
18	MF	(Norway) NOR	Jesper Tho
20	MF	(Norway) NOR	Sverre Brecheisen

No.	Pos.	Nation	Player
21	MF	(Norway) NOR	Fredrik Randsborg
24	DF	(Norway) NOR	Christian Randsborg
32	GK	(Norway) NOR	Sindre Beckman
40	MF	(Norway) NOR	Stian Stærkeby
44	MF	(Norway) NOR	Harald Sverdrup
66	MF	(Norway) NOR	Jonathan Saraby
67	DF	(Norway) NOR	Jørgen Akeren
75	MF	(Norway) NOR	Henrik Remo (jr)
80	MF	(Norway) NOR	Herman Hole
88	MF	(Norway) NOR	Sofus Halle-Jensen
