= Mjøndalen IF =

Norwegian sports club

Mjøndalen Idrettsforening
- Founded: 22 August 1910; 116 years ago
- Based in: Mjøndalen
- Stadium: Consto Arena (association football, men), Vassenga (bandy)
- Colours: Brown; White
- Website: mif.no

Mjøndalen IF is a Norwegian sports club located in Mjøndalen, Buskerud, Norway. Of the different athletic endeavours that the club supports, it may be best known in Norway for its bandy national championship teams and internationally for its association football national championship teams that have competed in UEFA championships. Founded in 1910, it has sections for association football, bandy, baseball, cycling, gymnastics, handball, judo and skiing. The club formerly had a section for athletics.

== History ==
Mjøndalen was founded on 22 August 1910.

== Association football ==
Mjøndalen IF Fotball
- Full name: Mjøndalen Idrettsforening Fotball
- Founded: August 22, 1910; 116 years ago
- Ground: Consto Arena
- Capacity: 4,350
- Chairman: Trond Stabekk
- Head coach: Kevin Nicol
- League: Obos Ligaen
- 2019: Eliteserien, 13th of 16
- Website: https://www.miffotball.no/
Home colours	Away colours

The club is best known for its football section, Mjøndalen IF Fotball, who has won the Norwegian Cup three times, 1933, 1934 and 1937 and finished in second place in Norway's top tier twice.

As runners-up in the 1968 Norwegian Cup, Mjøndalen men's football team represented Norway in the European Cup Winners' Cup in the following 1969–70 season. They were eliminated in the first round by Cardiff City who defeated Mjøndalen 12–2 on aggregate. After being promoted to the top division in 1971, Mjøndalen regularly played on the top-tier of Norwegian football in the 1970s and 1980s, and finished second in 1976 and 1986. Finishing runners-up in the league qualified them to represent Norway in the UEFA Cup the following season.

The last round of the 1976 season saw Mjøndalen beat SK Brann, a result which would have awarded them the league title if Lillestrøm SK had lost their game — which they did not. However, Mjøndalen's silver medals saw the team qualify for the 1977–78 UEFA Cup, where they lost the first round against Bayern Munich 0–12 on aggregate. After Mjøndalen's second silver medals in the 1986 league season, they were relegated the following season and were not promoted back to the top level until 1992. A highlight from the years in lower divisions was their meeting with German side Werder Bremen in the first round of the 1987–88 UEFA Cup. Mjøndalen lost 1–5 on aggregate, but their 1–0 win at home remain their only victory in UEFA competitions. After their 1992 top-flight comeback season, Mjøndalen was relegated, had financial challenges, and participated in the second, third and fourth tier of Norwegian football for a number of seasons.

Mjøndalen had a successful 2008 in 2. divisjon, and returned to 1. divisjon for the 2009 season. The club qualified to compete in the promotion knock out stage of 1. divisjon in both 2012 and 2013, and finally earned promotion to the Tippeligaen with a successful 2014 play-off result against Brann. Mjøndalen's return to Tippeligaen for 2015 marked their first appearance in the top tier in 22 years. The team finished in 15th place — second from bottom — and was relegated to the 2016 1. divisjon. In 2018, Mjøndalen finished in second place in the 2018 1. divisjon and was promoted to Eliteserien. In the following season, Mjøndalen succeeded in retaining their spot in the top flight through winning on the last day of the season.

== Bandy ==
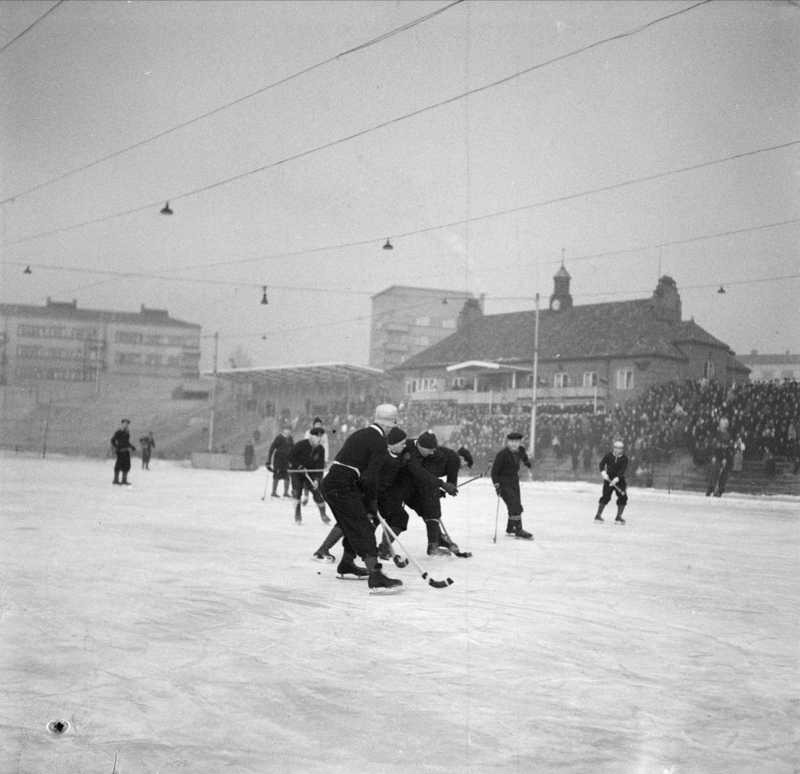
Mjøndalen playing a national bandy final against Frigg Oslo in 1947 and winning 3-1

The Mjøndalen sports club is also known for its bandy teams, a sport generally played on an iced over football field during the winter. Mjøndalen plays in Norwegian Bandy Premier League and has won 14 national championships. The team has also included several international players. The Mjøndalen bandy teams play their home games on the Vassenga field, separated from the Mjøndalen Stadion by the Mjøndalen club house.
