= 1907 Norwegian Football Cup =

Norgesmesterskapet i fotball for menn 1907

Tournament details
- Country: Norway
- Teams: 4

Final positions
- Champions: Mercantile (1st title)
- Runners-up: Sarpsborg

Tournament statistics
- Matches played: 2
- Goals scored: 4 (2 per match)

The 1907 Norwegian Football Cup was the 6th edition of the Norwegian annual knockout football tournament open in 1907 to local association leagues (kretsserier) champions, except Kristiania og omegn where a separate cup qualifying tournament was held. Mercantile defeated on 22 September Sarpsborg, at Nedre Frednes, Porsgrunn, 3-0, for their debut title.

== Semi-finals ==
Team 1	Score	Team 2
21 September 1907
Odd	0–1	Mercantile
Sarpsborg	w/o	Eidsvold IF

- Sarpsborg won on walkover.

== Final ==
22 September 1907

Mercantile	3–0	Sarpsborg
Bøhn 14'; Gjølme 65'; Endrerud 88'	Report

Nedre Frednes, Porsgrunn
Attendance: 4,000
Referee: August Heiberg Kahrs (Lyn)

Mercantile:
GK	Sverre Lie
DF	Macken Wiederøe Aas
DF	Einar Friis Baastad
MF	Wilhelm Brekke
MF	Sverre Erichsen
MF	Harald Johansen
FW	Oscar Gundersen
FW	Hans Endrerud
FW	Carl Frølich Hanssen (c)
FW	Minotti Bøhn
FW	Andreas Gjølme

Sarpsborg:
GK	Ole Andersen
DF	Christian Berg
DF	Oscar Olsen
MF	Karl Johansen
MF	Herbert Scott
MF	Einar Anvik
FW	Hugh William Kennworthy (c)
FW	Matheus Halvorsen
FW	Trygve Jølstad
FW	Hans Slang
FW	Erling Due
