= 1913 in Norwegian football =

Football in Norway
Men's football
- NM: Odd

Results from Norwegian football (soccer) in the year 1913.

== Class A of local association leagues ==
Class A of local association leagues (kretsserier) is the predecessor of a national league competition. The champions qualify for the 1913 Norwegian Cup.

League	Champion
Smaalenene	Kvik (Fredrikshald)
Kristiania og omegn	Mercantile
Romerike	Strømmen
Oplandene	Lyn (Gjøvik)
Vestfold	Ørn
Grenland	Odd
Sørlandske	Start
Vesterlen	Stavanger IF
Bergen og omegn	Brann
Nordenfjeldske	Brage

== Norwegian Cup ==
=== Final ===
13 October 1913

Odd	2–1	Mercantile
Haakonsen 32'; Aas 37'	Report	Iversen 42'

Urædd stadion, Porsgrunn
Attendance: 10,000
Referee: Ruben Gelford (Sweden)

== National team ==
8 June Friendly	Sweden	9–0	Norway	Stockholm, Sweden
19:30 (UTC+1); Match 9	Svensson 4', 65'; Bergström 9'; Gustafsson 23', 36', 50', 52'; Ekroth 75', 86'	Report		Stadium: Stockholm Olympic Stadium; Attendance: 10,000; Referee: Ruben Gelbord (Sweden)

14 September Friendly	Russia	1–1	Norway	Moscow, Russia
Match 10	Sysoev 40'	Report	Lauritzen 30'	Stadium: Sokolniki Sports Club Pitch; Attendance: 4,000; Referee: Alexander Schultz (Russia)

26 October Friendly	Norway	1–1	Sweden	Kristiania, Norway
Match 11	Skou 60' (pen.)	Report	Olsson 80'	Stadium: Bislett Stadion; Attendance: 10,000; Referee: Charles Buchwald (Denmark)
