= 1974 in Norwegian football =

Football in Norway
- Season: 1974

Men's football
- 1. divisjon: Viking
- 2. divisjon: Os (Group A); Lillestrøm (Group B)
- Cupen: Skeid

The 1974 season was the 69th season of competitive football in Norway.

== Men's football ==
=== League season ===
==== Promotion and relegation ====
League	Promoted to league	Relegated from league
1. divisjon	Sarpsborg; Vålerengen; Molde	Frigg; Lyn; Fredrikstad
2. divisjon	Henning; Lillestrøm; Os; Sogndal	Sandefjord BK; Skarbøvik; Sogndal; Stabæk

==== 1. divisjon ====
Viking FK won the championship, their fourth league title.

Pos	Team	Pld	W	D	L	GF	GA	GD	Pts	Qualification or relegation
1	Viking (C)	22	11	9	2	31	10	+21	31	Qualification for the European Cup first round
2	Molde	22	12	6	4	40	18	+22	30	Qualification for the UEFA Cup first round
3	Vålerengen	22	12	4	6	33	25	+8	28	Qualification for the UEFA Cup first round
4	Brann	22	9	9	4	36	20	+16	27	
5	Strømsgodset	22	11	5	6	38	28	+10	27	
6	Skeid	22	11	3	8	30	26	+4	25	Qualification for the Cup Winners' Cup first round
7	Start	22	9	6	7	37	31	+6	24	
8	Rosenborg	22	9	5	8	39	31	+8	23	
9	Mjøndalen	22	7	3	12	29	37	−8	17	
10	HamKam (R)	22	5	5	12	21	47	−26	15	Relegation to Second Division
11	Sarpsborg FK (R)	22	4	3	15	21	47	−26	11	Relegation to Second Division
12	Raufoss (R)	22	1	4	17	16	51	−35	6	Relegation to Second Division

Source: NIFS
Rules for classification: 1) points; 2) goal difference; 3) number of goals scored.
(C) Champions; (R) Relegated

==== 2. divisjon ====
===== Group A =====
Pos	Team	Pld	W	D	L	GF	GA	GD	Pts	Promotion, qualification or relegation
1	Os (C, P)	18	12	3	3	36	13	+23	27	Promotion to First Division
2	Fredrikstad (O, P)	18	12	2	4	40	14	+26	26	Qualification for the promotion play-offs
3	Bryne	18	12	1	5	25	15	+10	25	
4	Larvik Turn	18	9	3	6	30	13	+17	21	
5	Vard	18	8	5	5	23	21	+2	21	
6	Østsiden	18	7	6	5	21	14	+7	20	
7	Odd	18	3	6	9	12	28	−16	12	
8	Florvåg	18	3	4	11	12	38	−26	10	
9	Pors (R)	18	3	4	11	15	42	−27	10	Relegation to Third Division
10	Fram Larvik (R)	18	1	6	11	16	32	−16	8	Relegation to Third Division

Source: rsssf.no
Rules for classification: 1) points; 2) goal difference; 3) number of goals scored.
(C) Champions; (O) Play-off winners; (P) Promoted; (R) Relegated

===== Group B =====
Pos	Team	Pld	W	D	L	GF	GA	GD	Pts	Promotion, qualification or relegation
1	Lillestrøm (C, P)	18	15	2	1	44	8	+36	32	Promotion to First Division
2	Eidsvold Turn	18	10	5	3	35	19	+16	25	Qualification for the promotion play-offs
3	Lyn	18	7	8	3	33	15	+18	22	
4	Hødd	18	7	5	6	30	26	+4	19	
5	Frigg	18	7	4	7	20	23	−3	18	
6	Aalesund	18	5	5	8	17	23	−6	15	
7	Moss	18	4	7	7	16	26	−10	15	
8	Steinkjer	18	1	12	5	17	23	−6	14	
9	Henning (R)	18	3	4	11	16	40	−24	10	Relegation to Third Division
10	Clausenengen (R)	18	1	8	9	11	36	−25	10	Relegation to Third Division

Source: rsssf.no
Rules for classification: 1) points; 2) goal difference; 3) number of goals scored.
(C) Champions; (P) Promoted; (R) Relegated

===== District IX–X =====
Pos	Team	Pld	W	D	L	GF	GA	GD	Pts	Qualification or relegation
1	Bodø/Glimt (C)	14	11	3	0	54	4	+50	25	Qualification for the promotion play-offs
2	Mjølner	14	9	3	2	32	8	+24	21	
3	Mo	14	7	4	3	23	10	+13	18	
4	Andenes	14	6	4	4	11	28	−17	16	
5	Harstad	14	3	4	7	11	22	−11	10	
6	Narvik/Nor	14	4	1	9	11	29	−18	9	
7	Grand Bodø (R)	14	2	4	8	13	22	−9	8	Relegation to Third Division
8	Saltdalskameratene (R)	14	2	1	11	11	43	−32	5	Relegation to Third Division

Source: rsssf.no
Rules for classification: 1) points; 2) goal difference; 3) number of goals scored.
(C) Champions; (R) Relegated

===== District XI =====
Pos	Team	Pld	W	D	L	GF	GA	GD	Pts	Relegation
1	Kirkenes (C)	14	8	6	0	26	6	+20	22	
2	Alta	14	9	2	3	36	11	+25	20	
3	Stein	14	9	2	3	31	17	+14	20	
4	Honningsvåg	14	4	6	4	19	24	−5	14	
5	Sørild	14	5	3	6	23	22	+1	13	
6	Norild	14	5	3	6	22	21	+1	13	
7	Båtsfjord (R)	14	2	2	10	14	41	−27	6	Relegation to Third Division
8	Polarstjernen (R)	14	1	2	11	7	36	−29	4	Relegation to Third Division

Source: rsssf.no
Rules for classification: 1) points; 2) goal difference; 3) number of goals scored.
(C) Champions; (R) Relegated

=== Norwegian Cup ===
==== Final ====
20 October 1974

Skeid	3–1	Viking
Skjønsberg 40'; Thunberg 52', 89'	Report	Paulsen 50'

Ullevaal Stadion, Oslo
Attendance: 14,276
Referee: Egil Bergstad (Borre)

== UEFA competitions ==
=== European Cup ===
==== First round ====
Team 1	Agg.	Team 2	1st leg	2nd leg
Viking (Norway)	2–6	(Soviet Union) Ararat Yerevan	0–2	2–4

=== European Cup Winners' Cup ===
==== First round ====
Team 1	Agg.	Team 2	1st leg	2nd leg
Liverpool (England)	12–0	(Norway) Strømsgodset	11–0 (Report)	1–0 (Report)

=== UEFA Cup ===
==== First round ====
Team 1	Agg.	Team 2	1st leg	2nd leg
Rosenborg (Norway)	3–12	(Scotland) Hibernian	2–3 (Report)	1–9 (Report)
Start (Norway)	1–7	(Sweden) Djurgården	1–2 (Report)	0–5 (Report)

== National team ==
=== Results ===
23 May 1974 Friendly	East Germany	1–0	Norway	Rostock, East Germany
CET (UTC+1)	Jürgen Sparwasser 77'	Report		Stadium: Ostseestadion; Attendance: 18,333; Referee: Jan Keizer (Netherlands)

6 June 1974 Friendly	Norway	1–2	Scotland	Oslo, Norway
19:00 CET (UTC+1)	Tom Lund 19'	Report	Joe Jordan 74'; Kenny Dalglish 86'	Stadium: Ullevaal Stadion; Attendance: 18,432; Referee: Arne Axelsson (Sweden)
