= 1907 in Norwegian football =

Football in Norway
Men's football
- NM: Mercantile

Results from Norwegian football (soccer) in the year 1907.

== Cup ==
=== Final ===
22 September 1907

Mercantile	3–0	Sarpsborg
Bøhn 14'; Gjølme 65'; Endrerud 88'	Report

Nedre Frednes, Porsgrunn
Attendance: 4,000
Referee: August Heiberg Kahrs (Lyn)

== Class A of local association leagues ==
League	Champion
Smaalenene	Sarpsborg
Kristiania og omegn	Mercantile
Oplandene	Eidsvold IF
Vestfold	Ulf (Drammen)
Grenland	Grenland
Nordenfjeldske	Kvik (Trondheim)
