= 1912 Norwegian Football Cup =

Norgesmesterskapet i fotball for menn 1912

Tournament details
- Country: Norway
- Teams: 8

Final positions
- Champions: Mercantile (2nd title)
- Runners-up: Fram (Larvik)

Tournament statistics
- Matches played: 7
- Goals scored: 37 (5.29 per match)

The 1912 Norwegian Football Cup was the 11th season of the Norwegian annual knockout football tournament. The tournament was open for 1912 local association leagues (kretsserier) champions, and the defending champion, Lyn. Mercantile won their first title, having beaten Fram in the final.

== First round ==
Team 1	Score	Team 2
29 September 1912
NTHI	0–6	Mercantile
Start	2–9	Fram (Larvik)
Sarpsborg	1–0	Hamar
Stavanger	4–1	Drafn

== Semi-finals ==
Team 1	Score	Team 2
30 September 1912
Mercantile	2–0	Sarpsborg
6 October 1912
Stavanger	2–4	Fram (Larvik)

== Final ==
20 October 1912

Mercantile	6–0	Fram (Larvik)
Engebretsen 5'; Johansen 6'; Brekke; Holmsen; Endrerud	Report

Gamle Frogner, Kristiania
Attendance: 2,000
Referee: Trygve Lund (Odd)

Mercantile:
GK	Sverre Lie
DF	Macken Widerøe Aas
DF	Einar Friis Baastad
MF	H. Fredrik Holmsen
MF	Harald Johansen
MF	Carl Frølich Hanssen
FW	Rolf Aas
FW	Sigurd Brekke
FW	Hans Endrerud
FW	Kaare Engebretsen
FW	Eystein Holmsen

Fram (Larvik):
GK	Einar Jensen
DF	Fritz Christophersen
DF	Alf M. Andersen
MF	Alfred Hansen
MF	Peder Henriksen
MF	Henry Jonassen
FW	Carl Christophersen
FW	Olaf Ruud
FW	Johann Hallberg
FW	Thormod Kjeldsen
FW	Ingebretsen

== See also ==
- 1912 in Norwegian football
