= Football in Norway =

Football (soccer) in Norway
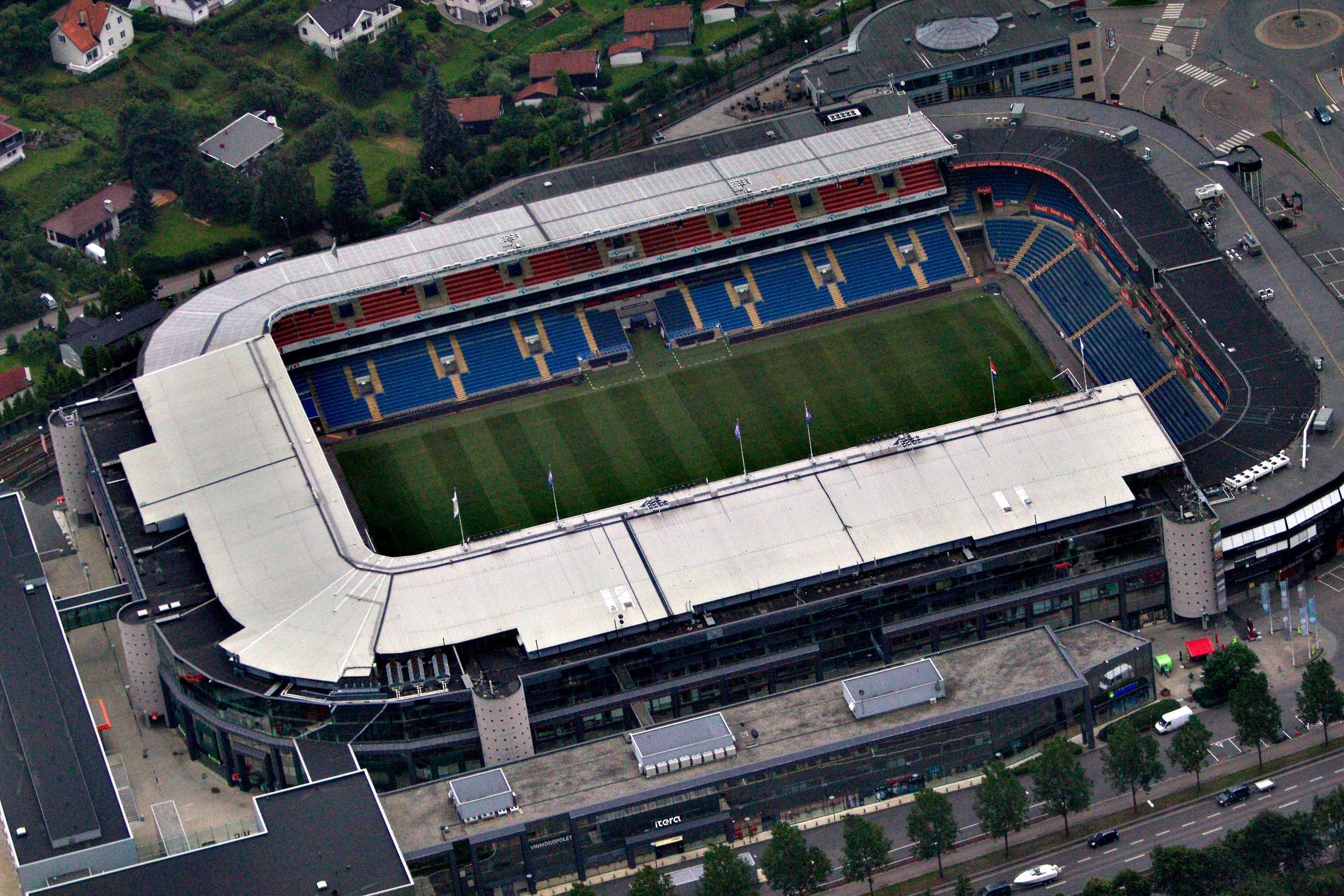
- Ullevål Stadium, Norway's national arena
- Country: Norway
- Governing body: Football Association of Norway
- National team: Norway national football team
- First played: 1883; 143 years ago

National competitions
- FIFA World Cup; UEFA European Championship; UEFA Nations League

Club competitions
- List: League: Eliteserien Toppserien; 1. divisjon; 2. divisjon; 3. divisjon; 4. divisjon; 5. divisjon; Cups: Norwegian Football Cup Norwegian Women's Cup Mesterfinalen

International competitions
- FIFA Club World Cup; FIFA Intercontinental Cup; UEFA Champions League; UEFA Women's Champions League; UEFA Europa League; UEFA Conference League; UEFA Super Cup

Association football is the most popular sport in Norway. The Football Association of Norway was founded in 1902 and the first international match was played in 1908. There are 1,822 registered football clubs and about 25,000 teams. There are 393,801 (104,597 of them are girls/women) registered football players, which means that 8.5% of the population play organized football.

== History ==
The first football team in Norway was probably started by a buekorps in Bergen, Nygaards Bataljon, in 1883. In 1885 the first Norwegian club however, Idrætsforeningen Odd, was founded in Skien. The footballing interest was very low, and was put on ice after a few months. However, the club Odd Grenland started up with football again in 1894, and are now Norway's oldest football club. The Football Association of Norway (the NFF), was founded in 1902, and quickly established a cup competition. After the NFF joined FIFA in 1908, Norway had its first ever international match, away against Sweden in Gothenburg; despite Norway taking the lead after a mere 45 seconds, Sweden went on to win 11–3. In 1911 Norway hosted its first international in Oslo, again against Sweden; this time Norway lost 4–0. In 1912 the Norway national team attended the Olympic Games, and were knocked out after losing to Denmark and Austria 7–0 and 1–0 respectively. The NFF hosted the FIFA congress in Oslo in 1914, where a national league was established with six teams competed for the title Drafn, Frigg, Kvik/Halden, Larvik Turn, Mercantile and Odd. Drafn from Drammen went on to be the first league winners. At the 1936 Summer Olympics, the Norway national men's team won their only medal (bronze). In the relatively successful tournament Norway beat Turkey and hosts Germany 4-0 and 2-0 respectively, losing to Italy in the semi-final, then beating Poland 3–2 in the third-place play-off to take the bronze medal. The team is known in Norway as "Bronselaget" meaning the Bronze team. The Norwegian football team won 2–1 to Brazil in 1998. Norway is also the only national team in history to have an undefeated record vs Brazil, Playing 4 matches and winning 2 and drawing the other 2.

== League system ==
The current national league system administered by the Norges Fotballforbund is organised as, from 2017 season, 1-1-2-6, where Eliteserien is the highest Norwegian level and OBOS-ligaen the second highest, followed by two third level (PostNord-ligaen) and six fourth level (Norsk Tipping-ligaen).

Division	Promotion	Relegation	Promotion/relegation playoff
Eliteserien	N/A	15th, 16th	14th Relegation
OBOS-ligaen	Winner, runner-up	15th, 16th	3rd, 4th, 5th and 6th Promotion, 14th Relegation
PostNord-ligaen	Winners in two groups	12th, 13th, 14th in two groups	2nd in two groups Promotion
Norsk Tipping-ligaen	Winners in six groups	12th, 13th, 14th in six groups	

Level	League(s)/Division(s)
1	Eliteserien; 16 clubs
2	OBOS-ligaen; 16 clubs
3	PostNord-ligaen; Group 1; 14 clubs			PostNord-ligaen; Group 2; 14 clubs
4	Norsk Tipping-ligaen; Group 1; 14 clubs	Norsk Tipping-ligaen; Group 2; 14 clubs	Norsk Tipping-ligaen; Group 3; 14 clubs	Norsk Tipping-ligaen; Group 4; 14 clubs	Norsk Tipping-ligaen; Group 5; 14 clubs	Norsk Tipping-ligaen; Group 6; 14 clubs
5–9	4. divisjon through 8. divisjon are regional divisions administered by the various regional football associations.

== Seasons ==
The national cup (Norwegian Championship) has been contested since 1902 and is the oldest football tournament in the country.

Norwegian football began to have regular seasons from 1937, when Norgesserien started with the inaugural 1937–38 season. Before that, tournaments and leagues were played irregularly. In 1963, Norwegian football changed from autumn-spring to spring-autumn seasons. The league football was suspended during the World War II.

1900s:	1900	1901	1902	1903	1904	1905	1906	1907	1908	1909
1910s:	1910	1911	1912	1913	1914	1915	1916	1917	1918	1919
1920s:	1920	1921	1922	1923	1924	1925	1926	1927	1928	1929
1930s:	1929–30	1930–31	1931–32	1932–33	1933–34	1934–35	1935–36	1936–37	1937–38	1938–39
1940s:	1939–40	1940–41	1941–42	1942–43	1943–44	1945	1946	1947	1948	1949
1950s:	1950	1951	1952	1953	1954	1955	1956	1957	1958	1959
1960s:	1960	1961	1962	1963	1964	1965	1966	1967	1968	1969
1970s:	1970	1971	1972	1973	1974	1975	1976	1977	1978	1979
1980s:	1980	1981	1982	1983	1984	1985	1986	1987	1988	1989
1990s:	1990	1991	1992	1993	1994	1995	1996	1997	1998	1999
2000s:	2000	2001	2002	2003	2004	2005	2006	2007	2008	2009
2010s:	2010	2011	2012	2013	2014	2015	2016	2017	2018	2019
2020s:	2020	2021	2022	2023	2024	2025	2026			

== European competitions ==
=== UEFA Champions League ===
The following teams have qualified for elimination rounds in the UEFA Champions League.

- Rosenborg BK (1996-97 - Quarter-finals)
- Molde FK (1999-00 - Group stage)
- FK Bodø/Glimt (2025-26 - Round of 16)

Rosenborg played in the Champions League on 10 further occasions.

== Football stadiums in Norway ==
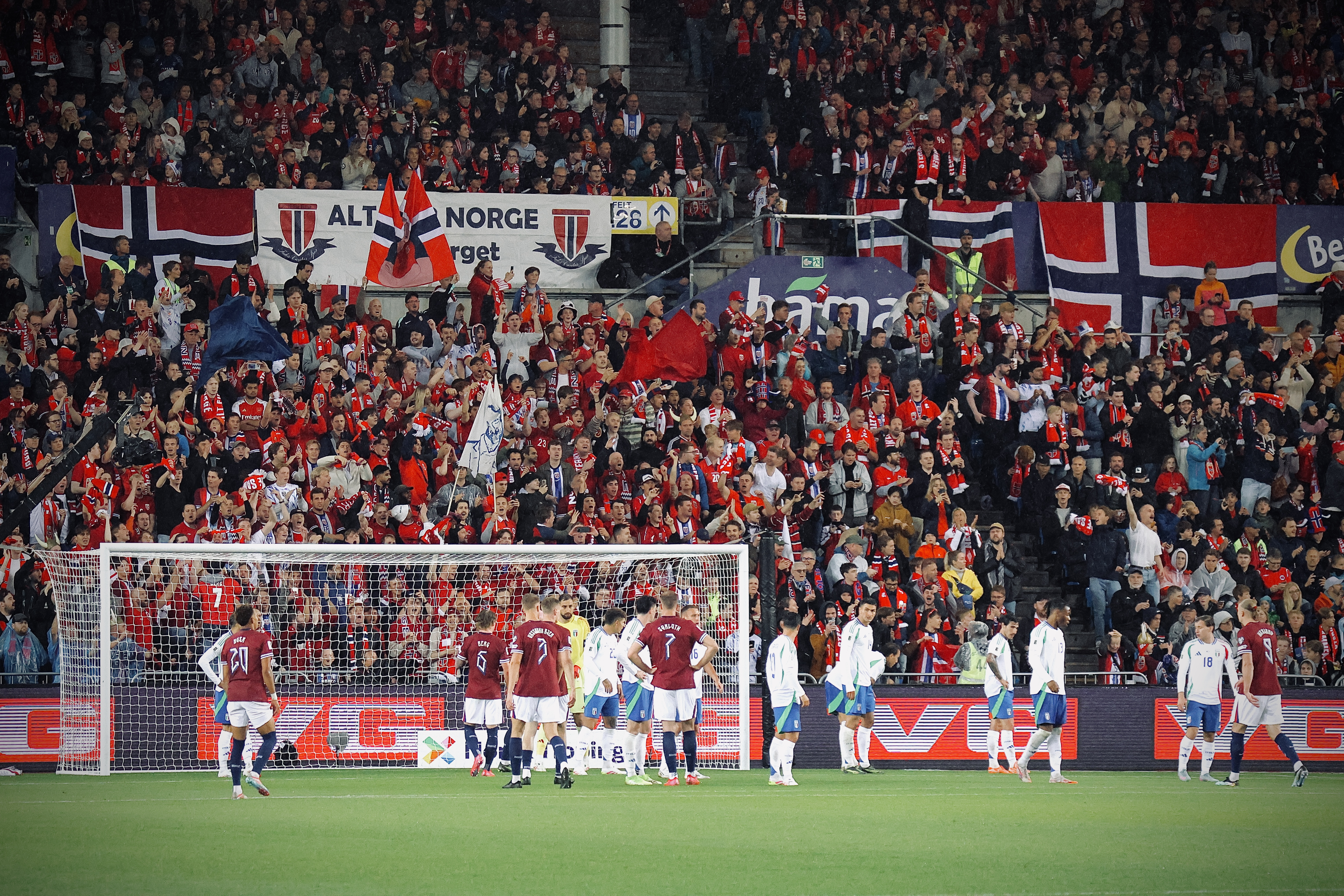
Ullevaal Stadion, 2025.

Stadiums with a capacity of 20,000 or higher are included.

#	Stadium	Capacity	City	Club	Division
1	Ullevaal Stadion	28,000	Oslo	Norway national football team	
2	Lerkendal Stadion	21,405	Trondheim	Rosenborg	Eliteserien

== Most successful clubs overall ==
As of 9 May 2026

local and lower league organizations are not included.

Club	Domestic Titles			
Club	Eliteserien	Norwegian Football Cup	Mesterfinalen	Total
Rosenborg	**26**	**12**	**3**	**41**
Fredrikstad	9	**12**	-	21
Viking	9	6	-	15
Lillestrøm	5	7	-	12
Odd	-	**12**	-	12
Molde	5	6	-	11
Brann	3	7	-	10
Lyn	2	8	-	10
Vålerenga	5	4	-	9
Skeid	1	8	-	9
Bodø/Glimt	4	3	-	7
Strømsgodset	2	5	-	7
Sarpsborg	-	6	-	6
Ørn Horten	-	4	-	4
Larvik Turn	3	-	-	3
Stabæk	1	1	1	3
Frigg	-	3	-	3
Mjøndalen	-	3	-	3
Start	2	-	-	2
Moss	1	1	-	2
Aalesund	-	2	-	2
Mercantile	-	2	-	2
Tromsø	-	2	-	2
Fram Larvik	1	-	-	1
Freidig	1	-	-	1
Bryne	-	1	-	1
Gjøvik-Lyn	-	1	-	1
Grane	-	1	-	1
Hødd	-	1	-	1
Kvik Halden	-	1	-	1
Sparta	-	1	-	1

- The articles in italic indicate the defunct leagues and the defunct cups.
- The figures in **bold** indicate the most times this competition has been won by a team.

== Attendances ==
The average attendance per top-flight football league season and the club with the highest average attendance:

Season	League average	Best club	Best club average
2025	7,152	Brann	16,086
2024	6,969	Brann	15,759
2023	7,240	Brann	15,204
2022	5,721	Rosenborg	13,092
2021	—	—	—
2020	—	—	—
2019	5,780	Rosenborg	12,704
2018	5,864	Rosenborg	16,424
2017	6,701	Rosenborg	17,605
2016	6,970	Rosenborg	17,585
2015	6,711	Rosenborg	18,039
2014	6,961	Rosenborg	13,915
2013	6,828	Rosenborg	14,806
2012	7,010	Rosenborg	13,394
2011	7,994	Rosenborg	14,510
2010	8,117	Rosenborg	16,911
2009	8,956	Rosenborg	17,652
2008	9,812	Rosenborg	18,957
2007	10,485	Rosenborg	19,903
2006	9,100	Rosenborg	19,481
2005	9,480	Rosenborg	17,529
2004	7,966	Rosenborg	17,383
2003	6,594	Rosenborg	15,825
2002	6,201	Rosenborg	14,626
2001	5,564	Brann	12,621
2000	5,715	Rosenborg	11,944
1999	5,372	Rosenborg	13,359
1998	5,267	Rosenborg	13,164
1997	4,738	Rosenborg	11,338
1996	5,123	Brann	11,526
1995	5,013	Rosenborg	10,280
1994	5,633	Rosenborg	11,061
1993	5,972	Rosenborg	11,750
1992	5,416	Rosenborg	13,569
1991	5,656	Brann	11,556
1990	4,984	Rosenborg	11,115
1989	4,729	Rosenborg	12,065
1988	4,422	Rosenborg	12,070

== See also ==
- List of Norwegian football league champions
- List of football stadiums in Norway

== Bibliography ==
- Sletten, Torstein (1972), Buekorpsene i Bergen: i tekst og bilder gjennom hundre år, ED.B. GIERTSENS FORLAG, ISBN 82-90073-00-3
