= 1918 Norwegian Football Cup =

Norgesmesterskapet i fotball for menn 1918

Tournament details
- Country: Norway
- Teams: 44

Final positions
- Champions: Kvik (Fredrikshald) (1st title)
- Runners-up: Brann

Tournament statistics
- Matches played: 42

The 1918 Norwegian Football Cup was the 17th season of the Norwegian annual knockout football tournament. The tournament was open for all members of NFF. Kvik (Fredrikshald) won their first title by beating Brann in the final. This was second consecutive year that Brann lost the final.

== First round ==
Twenty clubs received a bye to the second round.

Team 1	Score	Team 2
Fram (Larvik)	3–0	Tønsberg Turn
Frem	5–1	Viking
Hamar FL	5–1	Kristiania-Kameratene
Kristiania Ballklub	2–3	Mjøndalen
Pors	0–1	Drammen
Sportsklubben av 1910	4–1	Eidsvold
Rapp	4–2	Neset
Ready	0–5	Moss
Start	1–5	Ørn
Storm	6–0	Skotfos
Sverre	5–2	Freidig
Vidar	2–0	Nornen

== Second round ==
Team 1	Score	Team 2
Brage	1–2	Mercantile
Brann	3–0	Brodd
Drammen	5–0	Snøgg
Frigg	0–1	Fram (Larvik)
Lyn (Gjøvik)	1–0	Fredrikstad
Kristiansund	3–4	Aalesund
Kvik (Fredrikshald)	5–0	Trygg
Larvik Turn	3–2	Skiold
Lyn	3–2	Hamar FL
Mjøndalen	5–3	Storm
Odd	7–0	Sportsklubben av 1910
Stavanger	3–1	Drafn
Sverre	9–0	Rapp
Urædd	3–5	Sarpsborg
Vidar	4–2	Frem
Ørn	3–0	Moss

== Third round ==
Team 1	Score	Team 2
8 September 1918
Mercantile	1–2 (a.e.t.)	Ørn
Kvik (Fredrikshald)	4–2 (a.e.t.)	Odd
Sarpsborg	2–1	Drammen
Mjøndalen	0–5	Lyn
Lyn (Gjøvik)	1–3	Brann
Aalesund	0–5	Sverre
Larvik Turn	1–2	Fram (Larvik)
Stavanger	w/o	Vidar

== Quarter-finals ==
Team 1	Score	Team 2
22 September 1918
Sarpsborg	2–5	Kvik (Fredrikshald)
Ørn	4–1	Fram (Larvik)
Stavanger	0–0 (a.e.t.)	Brann
Lyn	w/o	Sverre
Replay: 27 September 1918
Brann	3–2 (a.e.t.)	Stavanger

== Semi-finals ==
Team 1	Score	Team 2
29 September 1918
Brann	1–0	Lyn
Kvik (Fredrikshald)	2–1	Ørn

== Final ==
13 October 1918

Kvik (Fredrikshald)	4–0	Brann
Helgesen 58', 61' (pen.); Andersen 71'; Alf Flinth 89'	Report

Marienlyst, Drammen
Attendance: 10-12,000
Referee: Ragnvald Smedvik (Frigg)

Kvik Halden:
GK	Ole Paulsen
DF	Johan Svendsen
DF	Otto Klein
MF	Ole Paulsbo
MF	Thomas Andresen
MF	Fritz Karlsen
FW	Peder Puck
FW	Alf Flinth
FW	Johnny Helgesen
FW	Arne Andersen
FW	Hartvig Olavesen

Brann:
GK	Sigurd Wathne
DF	Laurentius Eide
DF	John Johnsen
MF	Alexander Olsen
MF	George Deans
MF	Gerhard Gran
FW	Johann Greve
FW	Finn Berstad
FW	Torkel Trædal
FW	Alf Berstad
FW	Odd Johnsen

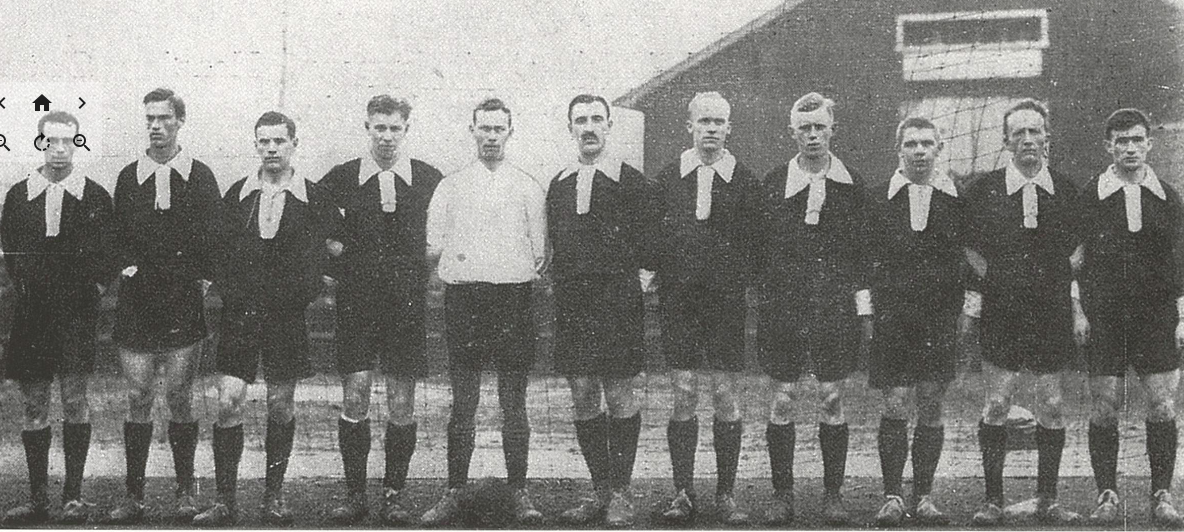
The winning team. From left: Peder Puck, Alf Flinth, Thomas Andresen, Johan Svendsen, Ole Paulsen, Otto Klein, Fritz Karlsen, Arne Andersen, Johnny Helgesen, Ole Poulsbo, Hartvig Olavesen. They are wearing some substitute textile outfits, as the "original" outfits were too old (made before the war) and there were not sufficient textiles available for making real outfits.

== See also ==
- 1918 in Norwegian football
