= 1912 in Norwegian football =

Football in Norway
Men's football
- NM: Mercantile

Results from Norwegian football (soccer) in the year 1912.

== Class A of local association leagues ==
Class A of local association leagues (kretsserier) is the predecessor of a national league competition. The champions qualify for the 1912 Norwegian Cup.

League	Champion
Smaalenene	Sarpsborg
Kristiania og omegn	Mercantile
Romerike	Strømmen
Oplandene	Hamar FL
Vestfold	Drafn
Grenland	Fram (Larvik)
Sørlandske	Start
Vesterlen	Stavanger IF
Bergen og omegn	Brann
Nordenfjeldske	NTHI

== Norwegian Cup ==
=== Final ===
20 October 1912

Mercantile	6–0	Fram (Larvik)
Engebretsen 5'; Johansen 6'; Brekke; Holmsen; Endrerud	Report

Gamle Frogner, Kristiania
Attendance: 2,000
Referee: Trygve Lund (Odd)

== National team ==
16 June Friendly	Norway	1–2	Sweden	Kristiania, Norway
20:00 (UTC+1); Match 4	R. Maartmann 22'	Report	Ekroth 37', 75'	Stadium: Frogner; Attendance: 6,000; Referee: Nils Middelboe (Denmark)

23 June Friendly	Norway	0–6	Hungary	Kristiania, Norway
19:30 (UTC+1); Match 5		Report	Schlosser-Lakatos 10', 89'; Tóth-Potya 31'; Bodnár 49', 71', 73'	Stadium: Frogner; Attendance: 4,000; Referee: Ruben Gelbord (Sweden)

30 June 1912 Olympic Games; Quarter-final	Denmark	7–0	Norway	Solna, Sweden
16:30 (UTC+1); Match 6	Olsen 4', 70', 88'; Wolfhagen 25'; Middelboe 37'; Nielsen 60', 85'	Report		Stadium: Råsunda IP; Attendance: 700; Referee: Ruben Gelbord (Sweden)

1 July 1912 Olympic Games Consolation tournament Quarter-final	Austria	1–0	Norway	Traneberg, Sweden
11:00 (UTC+1); Match 7	Neubauer 2'	Report		Stadium: Tranebergs IP; Attendance: 200; Referee: Per Sjöblom (Sweden)

3 November Friendly	Sweden	4–2	Norway	Gothenburg, Sweden
(UTC+1); Match 8	Frykman 10'; Svensson 18', 37'; Ekroth 70' (pen.)	Report	Ditlev-Simonsen 21', 55'	Stadium: Valhalla IP; Attendance: 3,000; Referee: Charles Buchwald (Denmark)
