= 1915 in Norwegian football =

Football in Norway
Men's football
- NM: Odd

Results from Norwegian football (soccer) in the year 1915.

== Class A of local association leagues ==
Class A of local association leagues (kretsserier) is the predecessor of a national league competition. The champions qualify for the 1915 Norwegian Cup.

=== Smaalenene ===
Pos	Team	Pld	W	D	L	GF	GA	GD	Pts
1	Kvik (Fredrikshald)	6	6	0	0	16	4	+12	12
2	Fredrikstad	6				15	15	0	10
3	Sarpsborg	6				14	17	−3	13
4	Moss	6				10	19	−9	3

Source: RSSSF Norway
Rules for classification: 1) points; 2) goal difference; 3) number of goals scored.

=== Kristiania og omegn ===
Pos	Team	Pld	W	D	L	GF	GA	GD	Pts
1	Lyn	6				9	4	+5	9
2	IF Ready	6				15	10	+5	8
3	Mercantile	6				14	15	−1	5
4	Frigg Oslo FK	6				9	18	−9	2

Source: RSSSF Norway
Rules for classification: 1) points; 2) goal difference; 3) number of goals scored.

=== Romerike ===
Pos	Team	Pld	W	D	L	GF	GA	GD	Pts
1	Norrøna	?						—	0

Source: RSSSF Norway
Rules for classification: 1) points; 2) goal difference; 3) number of goals scored.

=== Oplandene ===
Pos	Team	Pld	W	D	L	GF	GA	GD	Pts
1	Lyn (Gjøvik)	6	5	1	0	35	13	+22	11
2	Hamar FL	6				27	28	−1	7
3	Elverum	6				17	19	−2	6
4	Fremad	6	0	0	6	11	30	−19	0

Source: RSSSF Norway
Rules for classification: 1) points; 2) goal difference; 3) number of goals scored.

=== Vestfold ===
Pos	Team	Pld	W	D	L	GF	GA	GD	Pts
1	Ørn	6				27	7	+20	10
2	Drafn	6				14	9	+5	9
3	Drammens BK	6				7	21	−14	3
4	Drammens IF	6				11	22	−11	2

Source: RSSSF Norway
Rules for classification: 1) points; 2) goal difference; 3) number of goals scored.

=== Grenland ===
==== Group 1 ====
Pos	Team	Pld	W	D	L	GF	GA	GD	Pts
1	Odd	2	2	0	0	5	3	+2	4
2	Storm	2	0	0	2	3	5	−2	0

Source: RSSSF Norway
Rules for classification: 1) points; 2) goal difference; 3) number of goals scored.

==== Group 2 ====
Pos	Team	Pld	W	D	L	GF	GA	GD	Pts
1	Larvik Turn	4				10	6	+4	5
2	Fram (Larvik)	4				7	8	−1	4
3	Urædd	4				6	9	−3	3

Source: RSSSF Norway
Rules for classification: 1) points; 2) goal difference; 3) number of goals scored.

==== Championship final ====
Team 1	Score	Team 2
Odd	2–0	Larvik Turn

=== Telemark ===
Pos	Team	Pld	W	D	L	GF	GA	GD	Pts
1	Rjukan	4	3	1	0	17	9	+8	7
2	Snøgg	4	2	1	1	8	5	+3	5
3	Skotfoss	4	0	0	4	5	16	−11	0

Source: RSSSF Norway
Rules for classification: 1) points; 2) goal difference; 3) number of goals scored.

=== Sørlandske ===
Pos	Team	Pld	W	D	L	GF	GA	GD	Pts
1	Grane (Arendal)	2	1	0	1	2	4	−2	2
2	Start	2	1	0	1	4	2	+2	2

Source: RSSSF Norway
Rules for classification: 1) points; 2) goal difference; 3) number of goals scored.

==== Position play-offs ====
Team 1	Score	Team 2
Grane (Arendal)	5–2	Start

=== Vesterlen ===
Pos	Team	Pld	W	D	L	GF	GA	GD	Pts
1	Brodd	2	1	0	1			—	2
2	Stavanger IF	2	1	0	1			—	2

Source: RSSSF Norway
Rules for classification: 1) points; 2) goal difference; 3) number of goals scored.
- Vidar and Viking withdrew in autumn.

=== Bergen og omegn ===
Pos	Team	Pld	W	D	L	GF	GA	GD	Pts
1	Brann	6	5	1	0	25	9	+16	11
2	Viking (Bergen)	6				12	13	−1	5
3	Bergens SK	6				11	12	−1	3
4	Drott	6				5	19	−14	1

Source: RSSSF Norway
Rules for classification: 1) points; 2) goal difference; 3) number of goals scored.

=== Romsdalske ===
Pos	Team	Pld	W	D	L	GF	GA	GD	Pts
1	Rollon	5				8	5	+3	7
2	Aalesund	5				14	7	+7	7
3	Ynglingforeningen	5				13	13	0	7
4	International	5				5	13	−8	6
5	Kristiansund	5				11	16	−5	3
6	Nordlandet	5	0	0	5	10	17	−7	0

Source: RSSSF Norway
Rules for classification: 1) points; 2) goal difference; 3) number of goals scored.
- Rollon became champion after a position play-off.

=== Nordenfjeldske ===
Pos	Team	Pld	W	D	L	GF	GA	GD	Pts
1	Kvik (Trondheim)	?				13	5	+8	9
2	Brage	?				14	3	+11	5
3	Freidig	?				2	20	−18	0
4	NTHI	?				1	4	−3	0

Source: RSSSF Norway
Rules for classification: 1) points; 2) goal difference; 3) number of goals scored.

== Norwegian Cup ==
=== Final ===
10 October 1915

Odd	2–1	Kvik (Fredrikshald)
Thorstensen 5'; Gundersen 13'	Report	Helgesen 80'

Sarpsborg Stadion, Sarpsborg
Attendance: 6,000
Referee: Peder Christian Andersen (Kristiania BK)

== National team ==
27 June Friendly	Norway	1–1	Sweden	Kristiania, Norway
13:00 (UTC+1); Match 15	Engebretsen 54'	Report	Gunnarsson 82'	Stadium: Frogner stadion Attendance: 10,000; Referee: Hagbard Vestergaard (Denmark)

19 September Friendly	Denmark	8–1	Norway	Copenhagen, Denmark
13:30 (UTC+1); Match 16	Nielsen 23', 37', 71'; Olsen 28', 65', 77'; Rohde 53'; Castella 80' (pen.)	Report	H. Ditlev-Simonsen 20'	Stadium: Københavns Idrætspark; Attendance: 5,000; Referee: Erik Alstam (Sweden)

24 October Friendly	Sweden	5–2	Norway	Stockholm, Sweden
13:30 (UTC+1); Match 17	Svensson 10', 14', 61'; Gunnarsson 44', 77'	Report	H. Ditlev-Simonsen 65'; Wold 85' (pen.)	Stadium: Stockholm Olympic Stadium; Attendance: 8,000; Referee: Hagbard Vestergaard (Denmark)
