= Sysoyev =

Sysoev or Sysoyev (Russian: Сысоев) is a Russian surname. It was derived from the male given name Sysoy and literally means Sysoy's. Notable people with the surname include:

- Aleksey Sysoyev (born 1985), Russian decathlete
- Daniel Sysoev (1974–2009), Russian Orthodox priest, the rector of St. Thomas' church in southern Moscow and a prominent missionary
- Ekaterina Sysoeva (born 1981), Russian tennis player
- Igor Sysoev (born 1970), software developer
- Igor Sysoyev (born 1980), Russian triathlete
- Marina Sysoyeva (born 1959), Soviet high jumper
- Valentin Sysoyev (1887–1971), Russian football player
- Vladimir Sysoyev (born 1973), Russian politician

== See also ==
- Sysoyeva, Perm Krai, a village in Perm Krai, Russia
