= 1918 in Norwegian football =

Football in Norway
Men's football
- NM: Kvik (Fredrikshald)

Results from Norwegian football in the year 1918.

== Class A of local association leagues ==
Class A of local association leagues (kretsserier) is the predecessor of a national league competition.

League	Champion
Smaalenene	Sarpsborg
Kristiania og omegn, Group 1	Mercantile
Kristiania og omegn, Group 2	Frigg
Kristiania og omegn championship	Frigg
Romerike	Lillestrøm SK
Oplandene	Fremad
Østerdalen, Group North	Elverum
Østerdalen, Group South 1	Hof (Solør)
Østerdalen, Group South 2	Kongsvinger
Østerdalen championship	Kongsvinger
Vestfold, Group 1	Ørn
Vestfold, Group 2	Drafn
Vestfold championship	Ørn
Grenland, Group 1	Urædd
Grenland, Group 2	Odd
Grenland championship	Urædd
Telemark	Snøgg
Sørlandske	Start
Vesterlen	Stavanger IF
Bergen og omegn	Brann
Romsdalske	Kristiansund
Trondhjem	Brage
Inn-Trøndelagen	Sverre

== Norwegian Cup ==
=== Final ===
13 October 1918

Kvik (Fredrikshald)	4–0	Brann
Helgesen 58', 61' (pen.); Andersen 71'; Alf Flinth 89'	Report

Marienlyst, Drammen
Attendance: 10-12,000
Referee: Ragnvald Smedvik (Frigg)

== National team ==
26 May 1918 Friendly	Sweden	2–0	Norway	Stockholm, Sweden
13:30 (UTC+1); Match 27	Gustafsson 23'; Sterne 73'	Report		Stadium: Stockholm Olympic Stadium; Attendance: 10,000; Referee: Hagbard Vestergaard (Denmark)

16 June 1918 Friendly	Norway	3–1	Denmark	Kristiania, Norway
18:00 (UTC+1); Match 28	Helsing 25'; Helgesen 26'; Gundersen 70'	Report	Grøthan 88'	Stadium: Frogner stadion Attendance: 12,000; Referee: Ernst Albihn (Sweden)

15 September 1918 Friendly	Norway	2–1	Sweden	Kristiania, Norway
13:00 (UTC+1); Match 29	Gundersen 49', 55'	Report	Börjesson 68'	Stadium: Frogner stadion Attendance: 12,000; Referee: Hagbard Vestergaard (Denmark)

6 October 1918 Friendly	Denmark	4–0	Norway	Copenhagen, Denmark
13:30 (UTC+1); Match 30	C. Hansen 19'; Blicher 24' (pen.); Olsen 49'; Nielsen 82'	Report		Stadium: Københavns Idrætspark; Attendance: 13,000; Referee: Ernst Albihn (Sweden)
