= 1908 in Norwegian football =

Football in Norway
Men's football
- NM: Lyn

Results from Norwegian football in the year 1908.

== Cup ==
=== Final ===
13 September 1908

| Lyn | 3–2 | Odd |
|---|---|---|
| | Report |

Gamle Frogner, Kristiania
Referee: Charles Stanley Davis (Sarpsborg)

== National team ==
| 12 July 1908 Friendly | Sweden | 11–3 | Norway | Gothenburg, Sweden |
| (UTC+1); Match 1 | Gustafsson 14', 79'; Börjesson 24', 60', 75', 86'; Bergström 27', 29', 44', 89'; Lindman 63' | Report | Bøhn 1', 66'; Endrerud 45' | Stadium: Idrottsplatsen, Tegelbruksängen; Attendance: 3,000; Referee: Charles Smith (England) |
