= 1910 Norwegian Football Cup =

Norgesmesterskapet i fotball for menn 1910

Tournament details
- Country: Norway
- Teams: 8

Final positions
- Champions: Lyn (3rd title)
- Runners-up: Odd

Tournament statistics
- Matches played: 7
- Goals scored: 36 (5.14 per match)

The 1910 Norwegian Football Cup was the ninth season of the Norwegian annual knockout football tournament. The tournament was open for 1910 local association leagues (kretsserier) champions, and the defending champion, Lyn. Lyn won their third consecutive title, having beaten Odd in all three finals.

== First round ==
Team 1	Score	Team 2
3 September 1910
Stavanger	1–4	Odd
Kvik (Trondheim)	0–4	Lyn
4 September 1910
Ørn	1–3	Fredrikstad
Mercantile	9–2	Lyn (Gjøvik)

== Semi-finals ==
Team 1	Score	Team 2
18 September 1910
Fredrikstad	1–2 (a.e.t.)	Odd
Lyn	3–0	Mercantile

== Final ==
25 September 1910

Lyn	4–2	Odd
Nysted 30', 76', 77'; Krefting 75'	Report	Gulbrandsen 40'; Reinholdt 55'

Gamle Frogner, Kristiania
Attendance: 5,000
Referee: Theodor Hansen (Fredrikstad)

Lyn:
GK	August Heiberg Kahrs
DF	Alf Paus
DF	Paul Due
MF	Nikolai Ramm Østgaard
MF	Erling Lorck
MF	Henrik Nordby
FW	Ragnvald Heyerdahl-Larsen
FW	Kristian Krefting
FW	Victor Nysted
FW	Erling Maartmann
FW	Rolf Maartmann

Odd:
GK	Thorstrup Rødseth
DF	Peder Henriksen
DF	Per Skou
MF	Thoralf Grubbe
MF	Marius Lund
MF	Einar Pedersen
FW	Otto Olsen
FW	Sverre Hansen
FW	Bjarne Gulbrandsen
FW	August Fredriksen
FW	Henry Reinholdt
