= 1975 in Norwegian football =

Football in Norway
- Season: 1975

Men's football
- 1. divisjon: Viking
- 2. divisjon: Bryne (Group A); HamKam (Group B)
- Cupen: Bodø/Glimt

The 1975 season was the 70th season of competitive football in Norway.

== Men's football ==
=== League season ===
==== Promotion and relegation ====
League	Promoted to league	Relegated from league
1. divisjon	Os; Fredrikstad; Lillestrøm	HamKam; Sarpsborg; Raufoss
2. divisjon	Brumunddal; Lisleby; Sunndal; Varegg	Clausenengen; Fram Larvik; Henning; Pors

==== 1. divisjon ====
Viking FK won the championship, their fifth league title.

Pos	Team	Pld	W	D	L	GF	GA	GD	Pts	Qualification or relegation
1	Viking (C)	22	12	6	4	38	20	+18	30	Qualification for the European Cup first round
2	Brann	22	10	7	5	36	27	+9	27	Qualification for the UEFA Cup first round
3	Start	22	11	5	6	29	20	+9	27	Qualification for the UEFA Cup first round
4	Rosenborg	22	11	5	6	36	28	+8	27	
5	Strømsgodset	22	10	4	8	39	27	+12	24	
6	Mjøndalen	22	9	6	7	21	21	0	24	
7	Lillestrøm	22	10	3	9	27	20	+7	23	
8	Molde	22	7	8	7	27	29	−2	22	
9	Fredrikstad	22	8	6	8	31	35	−4	22	
10	Skeid (R)	22	5	7	10	18	23	−5	17	Relegation to Second Division
11	Vålerengen (R)	22	3	10	9	19	36	−17	16	Relegation to Second Division
12	Os (R)	22	0	5	17	15	50	−35	5	Relegation to Second Division

Source: NIFS
Rules for classification: 1) points; 2) goal difference; 3) number of goals scored.
(C) Champions; (R) Relegated

==== 2. divisjon ====
===== Group A =====
Pos	Team	Pld	W	D	L	GF	GA	GD	Pts	Promotion, qualification or relegation
1	Bryne (C, P)	18	15	2	1	41	10	+31	32	Promotion to First Division
2	Vard (O, P)	18	14	1	3	40	15	+25	29	Qualification for the promotion play-offs
3	Lyn	18	11	3	4	38	16	+22	25	
4	Steinkjer	18	9	4	5	34	22	+12	22	
5	Varegg	18	5	6	7	23	27	−4	16	
6	Hødd	18	5	6	7	15	25	−10	16	
7	Frigg	18	5	5	8	23	33	−10	15	
8	Aalesund	18	5	4	9	24	23	+1	14	
9	Sunndal (R)	18	1	5	12	11	36	−25	7	Relegation to Third Division
10	Florvåg (R)	18	1	2	15	12	54	−42	4	Relegation to Third Division

Source: rsssf.no
Rules for classification: 1) points; 2) goal difference; 3) number of goals scored.
(C) Champions; (O) Play-off winners; (P) Promoted; (R) Relegated

===== Group B =====
Pos	Team	Pld	W	D	L	GF	GA	GD	Pts	Promotion, qualification or relegation
1	HamKam (C, P)	18	9	7	2	31	15	+16	25	Promotion to First Division
2	Odd	18	7	7	4	30	22	+8	21	Qualification for the promotion play-offs
3	Sarpsborg FK	18	7	7	4	24	18	+6	21	
4	Larvik Turn	18	7	5	6	25	20	+5	19	
5	Raufoss	18	7	5	6	19	22	−3	19	
6	Brumunddal	18	5	8	5	18	20	−2	18	
7	Eidsvold Turn	18	6	4	8	22	32	−10	16	
8	Moss	18	6	3	9	28	27	+1	15	
9	Østsiden (R)	18	6	3	9	15	26	−11	15	Relegation to Third Division
10	Lisleby (R)	18	3	5	10	13	23	−10	11	Relegation to Third Division

Source: rsssf.no
Rules for classification: 1) points; 2) goal difference; 3) number of goals scored.
(C) Champions; (P) Promoted; (R) Relegated

===== District IX–X =====
Pos	Team	Pld	W	D	L	GF	GA	GD	Pts	Qualification or relegation
1	Bodø/Glimt (Note: Bodø/Glimt qualified for the European Cup Winners' Cup as Norwegian Cup winners.) (C)	14	14	0	0	55	12	+43	28	Qualification for the Cup Winners' Cup first round and the promotion play-offs
2	Harstad	14	6	2	6	21	16	+5	14	
3	Mo	14	5	4	5	16	19	−3	14	
4	Stålskameratene	14	3	7	4	18	19	−1	13	
5	Mjølner	14	4	5	5	15	26	−11	13	
6	Tromsø (R)	14	4	4	6	23	16	+7	12	Relegation to Third Division
7	Andenes (R)	14	3	4	7	15	23	−8	10	Relegation to Third Division
8	Narvik/Nor (R)	14	2	4	8	16	48	−32	8	Relegation to Third Division

Source: rsssf.no
Rules for classification: 1) points; 2) goal difference; 3) number of goals scored.
(C) Champions; (R) Relegated

===== District XI =====
Pos	Team	Pld	W	D	L	GF	GA	GD	Pts	Relegation
1	Norild (C)	14	9	4	1	32	10	+22	22	
2	Alta	14	9	4	1	36	15	+21	22	
3	Stein (R)	14	8	2	4	24	17	+7	18	Relegation to Third Division
4	Kirkenes (R)	14	6	4	4	28	13	+15	16	Relegation to Third Division
5	Sørild (R)	14	6	2	6	23	26	−3	14	Relegation to Third Division
6	Vardø (R)	14	4	2	8	19	37	−18	10	Relegation to Third Division
7	Honningsvåg (R)	14	2	3	9	19	29	−10	7	Relegation to Third Division
8	Hammerfest (R)	14	1	1	12	9	43	−34	3	Relegation to Third Division

Source: rsssf.no
Rules for classification: 1) points; 2) goal difference; 3) number of goals scored.
(C) Champions; (R) Relegated

=== Norwegian Cup ===
==== Final ====
26 October 1975

Bodø/Glimt	2–0	Vard
Solhaug 70'; Hanssen 88'	Report

Ullevaal Stadion, Oslo
Attendance: 24,778
Referee: Kaare Lindboe (Vidar)

== UEFA competitions ==
=== European Cup ===
==== First round ====
Team 1	Agg.	Team 2	1st leg	2nd leg
Molenbeek (Belgium)	4–2	(Norway) Viking	3–2	1–0

=== European Cup Winners' Cup ===
==== First round ====
Team 1	Agg.	Team 2	1st leg	2nd leg
Skeid (Norway)	1–8	(Poland) Stal Rzeszów	1–4	0–4

=== UEFA Cup ===
==== First round ====
Team 1	Agg.	Team 2	1st leg	2nd leg
Molde (Norway)	1–6	(Sweden) Öster	1–0	0–6
Athlone Town (Republic of Ireland)	4–2	(Norway) Vålerengen	3–1	1–1

== National team ==
=== Results ===
15 May 1975 1976 Olympic Games qualifying	Finland	3–5	Norway	Helsinki, Finland
CET (UTC+1)	Toivola 4', 67'; Heiskainen 65'	Report	Kvia 14' (pen.), 86'; Skuseth 49'; Lund 83'; Thunberg 85'	Stadium: Helsinki Olympic Stadium; Attendance: 12,031; Referee: Erik Fredriksson (Sweden)

9 June 1975 UEFA Euro 1976 qualifying	Norway	1–3	Yugoslavia	Oslo, Norway
19:00 CET (UTC+1)	Thunberg 65'	Report	Buljan 12'; Bogićević 13'; Šurjak 25'	Stadium: Ullevaal Stadion; Attendance: 21,843; Referee: Edgard Pedersen (Denmark)
