= 1909 in Norwegian football =

Football in Norway
Men's football
- NM: Lyn

Results from Norwegian football (soccer) in the year 1909.

== Class A of local association leagues ==
Class A of local association leagues (kretsserier) is the predecessor of a national league competition. The champions qualify for the 1909 Norwegian cup.

League	Champion
Smaalenene	Fredrikstad
Kristiania og omegn	Mercantile
Oplandene	Lyn (Gjøvik)
Vestfold	Ulf (Drammen)
Grenland	Odd
Nordenfjeldske	Trondhjems Teknikere

== Norwegian Cup ==
=== Final ===
26 September 1909

Lyn	4–3 (a.e.t.)	Odd
	Report

Gamle Frogner, Kristiania
Attendance: 4,000
Referee: Christian Wiese (Akademisk FK)
