= 1974 Norwegian Second Division =

2. divisjon
- Season: 1974
- Champions: Os (Group A); Lillestrøm (Group B); BodøGlimt (District IX–X); Kirkenes (District XI)
- Promoted: Os (Group A); Fredrikstad (Group A); Lillestrøm (Group B)
- Relegated: Pors (Group A); Fram Larvik (Group A); Henning (Group B); Clausenengen (Group B)

The 1974 2. divisjon was a Norwegian second-tier football league season.

The league was contested by 36 teams, divided into a total of four groups; A and B (non-Northern Norwegian teams) and two district groups which contained teams from Northern Norway: district IX–X and district XI. The winners of group A and B were promoted to the 1975 1. divisjon, while the winners of the district groups qualified for the Northern Norwegian final. The second placed teams in group A and B met the winner of the district IX–X in a qualification round where the winner was promoted to 1. divisjon. The winner of district XI was not eligible for promotion. The bottom two teams inn all groups were relegated to the 3. divisjon.

Os won group A. Lillestrøm won group B with 32 points. Both teams promoted to the 1975 1. divisjon. Fredrikstad finished second in group A won the qualification play-offs and was also promoted.

== Tables ==
=== Group A ===
| Pos | Team | Pld | W | D | L | GF | GA | GD | Pts | Promotion, qualification or relegation |
|---|---|---|---|---|---|---|---|---|---|---|
| 1 | Os (C, P) | 18 | 12 | 3 | 3 | 36 | 13 | +23 | 27 | Promotion to First Division |
| 2 | Fredrikstad (O, P) | 18 | 12 | 2 | 4 | 40 | 14 | +26 | 26 | Qualification for the promotion play-offs |
| 3 | Bryne | 18 | 12 | 1 | 5 | 25 | 15 | +10 | 25 | |
| 4 | Larvik Turn | 18 | 9 | 3 | 6 | 30 | 13 | +17 | 21 | |
| 5 | Vard | 18 | 8 | 5 | 5 | 23 | 21 | +2 | 21 | |
| 6 | Østsiden | 18 | 7 | 6 | 5 | 21 | 14 | +7 | 20 | |
| 7 | Odd | 18 | 3 | 6 | 9 | 12 | 28 | −16 | 12 | |
| 8 | Florvåg | 18 | 3 | 4 | 11 | 12 | 38 | −26 | 10 | |
| 9 | Pors (R) | 18 | 3 | 4 | 11 | 15 | 42 | −27 | 10 | Relegation to Third Division |
| 10 | Fram Larvik (R) | 18 | 1 | 6 | 11 | 16 | 32 | −16 | 8 | Relegation to Third Division |

Source: rsssf.no
Rules for classification: 1) points; 2) goal difference; 3) number of goals scored.
(C) Champions; (O) Play-off winners; (P) Promoted; (R) Relegated

=== Group B ===
| Pos | Team | Pld | W | D | L | GF | GA | GD | Pts | Promotion, qualification or relegation |
|---|---|---|---|---|---|---|---|---|---|---|
| 1 | Lillestrøm (C, P) | 18 | 15 | 2 | 1 | 44 | 8 | +36 | 32 | Promotion to First Division |
| 2 | Eidsvold Turn | 18 | 10 | 5 | 3 | 35 | 19 | +16 | 25 | Qualification for the promotion play-offs |
| 3 | Lyn | 18 | 7 | 8 | 3 | 33 | 15 | +18 | 22 | |
| 4 | Hødd | 18 | 7 | 5 | 6 | 30 | 26 | +4 | 19 | |
| 5 | Frigg | 18 | 7 | 4 | 7 | 20 | 23 | −3 | 18 | |
| 6 | Aalesund | 18 | 5 | 5 | 8 | 17 | 23 | −6 | 15 | |
| 7 | Moss | 18 | 4 | 7 | 7 | 16 | 26 | −10 | 15 | |
| 8 | Steinkjer | 18 | 1 | 12 | 5 | 17 | 23 | −6 | 14 | |
| 9 | Henning (R) | 18 | 3 | 4 | 11 | 16 | 40 | −24 | 10 | Relegation to Third Division |
| 10 | Clausenengen (R) | 18 | 1 | 8 | 9 | 11 | 36 | −25 | 10 | Relegation to Third Division |

Source: rsssf.no
Rules for classification: 1) points; 2) goal difference; 3) number of goals scored.
(C) Champions; (P) Promoted; (R) Relegated

=== District IX–X ===
| Pos | Team | Pld | W | D | L | GF | GA | GD | Pts | Qualification or relegation |
|---|---|---|---|---|---|---|---|---|---|---|
| 1 | Bodø/Glimt (C) | 14 | 11 | 3 | 0 | 54 | 4 | +50 | 25 | Qualification for the promotion play-offs |
| 2 | Mjølner | 14 | 9 | 3 | 2 | 32 | 8 | +24 | 21 | |
| 3 | Mo | 14 | 7 | 4 | 3 | 23 | 10 | +13 | 18 | |
| 4 | Andenes | 14 | 6 | 4 | 4 | 11 | 28 | −17 | 16 | |
| 5 | Harstad | 14 | 3 | 4 | 7 | 11 | 22 | −11 | 10 | |
| 6 | Narvik/Nor | 14 | 4 | 1 | 9 | 11 | 29 | −18 | 9 | |
| 7 | Grand Bodø (R) | 14 | 2 | 4 | 8 | 13 | 22 | −9 | 8 | Relegation to Third Division |
| 8 | Saltdalskameratene (R) | 14 | 2 | 1 | 11 | 11 | 43 | −32 | 5 | Relegation to Third Division |

Source: rsssf.no
Rules for classification: 1) points; 2) goal difference; 3) number of goals scored.
(C) Champions; (R) Relegated

=== District XI ===
| Pos | Team | Pld | W | D | L | GF | GA | GD | Pts | Relegation |
|---|---|---|---|---|---|---|---|---|---|---|
| 1 | Kirkenes (C) | 14 | 8 | 6 | 0 | 26 | 6 | +20 | 22 | |
| 2 | Alta | 14 | 9 | 2 | 3 | 36 | 11 | +25 | 20 | |
| 3 | Stein | 14 | 9 | 2 | 3 | 31 | 17 | +14 | 20 | |
| 4 | Honningsvåg | 14 | 4 | 6 | 4 | 19 | 24 | −5 | 14 | |
| 5 | Sørild | 14 | 5 | 3 | 6 | 23 | 22 | +1 | 13 | |
| 6 | Norild | 14 | 5 | 3 | 6 | 22 | 21 | +1 | 13 | |
| 7 | Båtsfjord (R) | 14 | 2 | 2 | 10 | 14 | 41 | −27 | 6 | Relegation to Third Division |
| 8 | Polarstjernen (R) | 14 | 1 | 2 | 11 | 7 | 36 | −29 | 4 | Relegation to Third Division |

Source: rsssf.no
Rules for classification: 1) points; 2) goal difference; 3) number of goals scored.
(C) Champions; (R) Relegated

== Promotion play-offs ==
=== Results ===
- Bodø/Glimt – Eidsvold Turn 2–2
- Eidsvold Turn – Fredrikstad 0–1
- Fredrikstad – Bodø/Glimt 2–1

Fredrikstad won the qualification round and won promotion to the 1. divisjon.

=== Play-off table ===
| Pos | Team | Pld | W | D | L | GF | GA | GD | Pts | Promotion |
|---|---|---|---|---|---|---|---|---|---|---|
| 1 | Fredrikstad (O, P) | 2 | 2 | 0 | 0 | 3 | 1 | +2 | 4 | Promotion to First Division |
| 2 | Bodø/Glimt | 2 | 0 | 1 | 1 | 3 | 4 | −1 | 1 | |
| 3 | Eidsvold Turn | 2 | 0 | 1 | 1 | 2 | 3 | −1 | 1 | |

Source: rsssf.no
Rules for classification: 1) points; 2) goal difference; 3) number of goals scored.
(O) Play-off winners; (P) Promoted

== Northern Norwegian Final ==
A Northern Norwegian Final was played between the winners of the two district groups, Bodø/Glimt and Kirkenes.

- Bodø/Glimt – Kirkenes 8–2
