= 1913 Norwegian Football Cup =

Norgesmesterskapet i fotball for menn 1913

Tournament details
- Country: Norway
- Teams: 8

Final positions
- Champions: Odd (5th title)
- Runners-up: Mercantile

Tournament statistics
- Matches played: 7
- Goals scored: 41 (5.86 per match)

The 1913 Norwegian Football Cup was the 12th season of the Norwegian annual knockout football tournament. The tournament was open for 1913 local association leagues (kretsserier) champions, and the defending champion. Odd won their fifth title, having beaten the defending champions Mercantile in the final.

== First round ==
Team 1	Score	Team 2
14 September 1913
Lyn (Gjøvik)	0–7	Kvik (Fredrikshald)
Stavanger	6–4	Brann

- The rest of the teams had a walkover.

== Second round ==
Team 1	Score	Team 2
21 September 1913
Mercantile	8–0	Brage
Stavanger	2–5	Odd
Ørn	w/o	Grane (Arendal)

- Kvik (Fredrikshald) had a walkover.

== Semi-finals ==
Team 1	Score	Team 2
29 September 1913
Mercantile	2–1 (a.e.t.)	Kvik (Fredrikshald)
Ørn	0–3	Odd

== Final ==
13 October 1913

Odd	2–1	Mercantile
Haakonsen 32'; Aas 37'	Report	Iversen 42'

Urædd stadion, Porsgrunn
Attendance: 10,000
Referee: Ruben Gelford (Sweden)

Odd:
GK	Ingolf Pedersen
DF	Otto Aulie
DF	Per Skou
MF	Bjarne Gulbrandsen
MF	Peder Henriksen
MF	Thoalf Grubbe
FW	Henry Reinholdt
FW	Sverre Andersen
FW	Per Haraldsen
FW	Rolf Haakonsen
FW	Jonas Aas

Mercantile:
GK	Sverre Lie
DF	Harald Schreiner
DF	Charles Herlofsen
MF	Thomas Hesselberg Berntzen
MF	Harald Johansen
MF	H. Fredrik Holmsen
FW	Rolf Aass
FW	Kaare Engebretsen
FW	Hans Endrerud
FW	Olaf Iversen
FW	Eystein Holmsen

== See also ==
- 1913 in Norwegian football
