= 1906 in Norwegian football =

Football in Norway
Men's football
- NM: Odd

Results from Norwegian football (soccer) in the year 1906.

== Cup ==
=== Final ===
9 September 1906

Odd	1–0	Sarpsborg
60'	Report

Gamle Frogner, Kristiania
Referee: Sverre Strand (Grane)

== Class A of local association leagues ==
The predecessor of a national league competition.

The champions qualify to the 1905 Norwegian cup (The exception being Nordenfjeldske, which was not yet a NFF member).

League	Champion
Smaalenene	Sarpsborg
Kristiania og omegn	Mercantile
Oplandene	Eidsvold IF
Vestfold/Grenland	Odd
Nordenfjeldske	Kvik (Trondheim)
