= 1910 in Norwegian football =

Football in Norway
Men's football
- NM: Lyn

Results from Norwegian football (soccer) in the year 1910.

== Class A of local association leagues ==
Class A of local association leagues (kretsserier) is the predecessor of a national league competition. The champions qualify for the 1910 Norwegian cup.

League	Champion
Smaalenene	Fredrikstad
Kristiania og omegn	Mercantile
Oplandene	Lyn (Gjøvik)
Vestfold	Ørn
Grenland	Grenland
Vestlandske	Stavanger IF
Nordenfjeldske	Kvik (Trondheim)

== Norwegian Cup ==
=== Final ===
25 September 1910

Lyn	4–2	Odd
Nysted 30', 76', 77'; Krefting 75'	Report	Gulbrandsen 40'; Reinholdt 55'

Gamle Frogner, Kristiania
Attendance: 5,000
Referee: Theodor Hansen (Fredrikstad)

== National team ==
11 September 1910 Friendly	Norway	0–4	Sweden	Kristiania, Norway
13:00 (UTC+1); Match 2		Report	Myhrberg 47', 62'; Gustafsson 60', 80'	Stadium: Frogner; Attendance: 6,000; Referee: Charles Buchwald (Denmark)
