= Carl Frølich Hanssen =

Norwegian military officer and sports executive

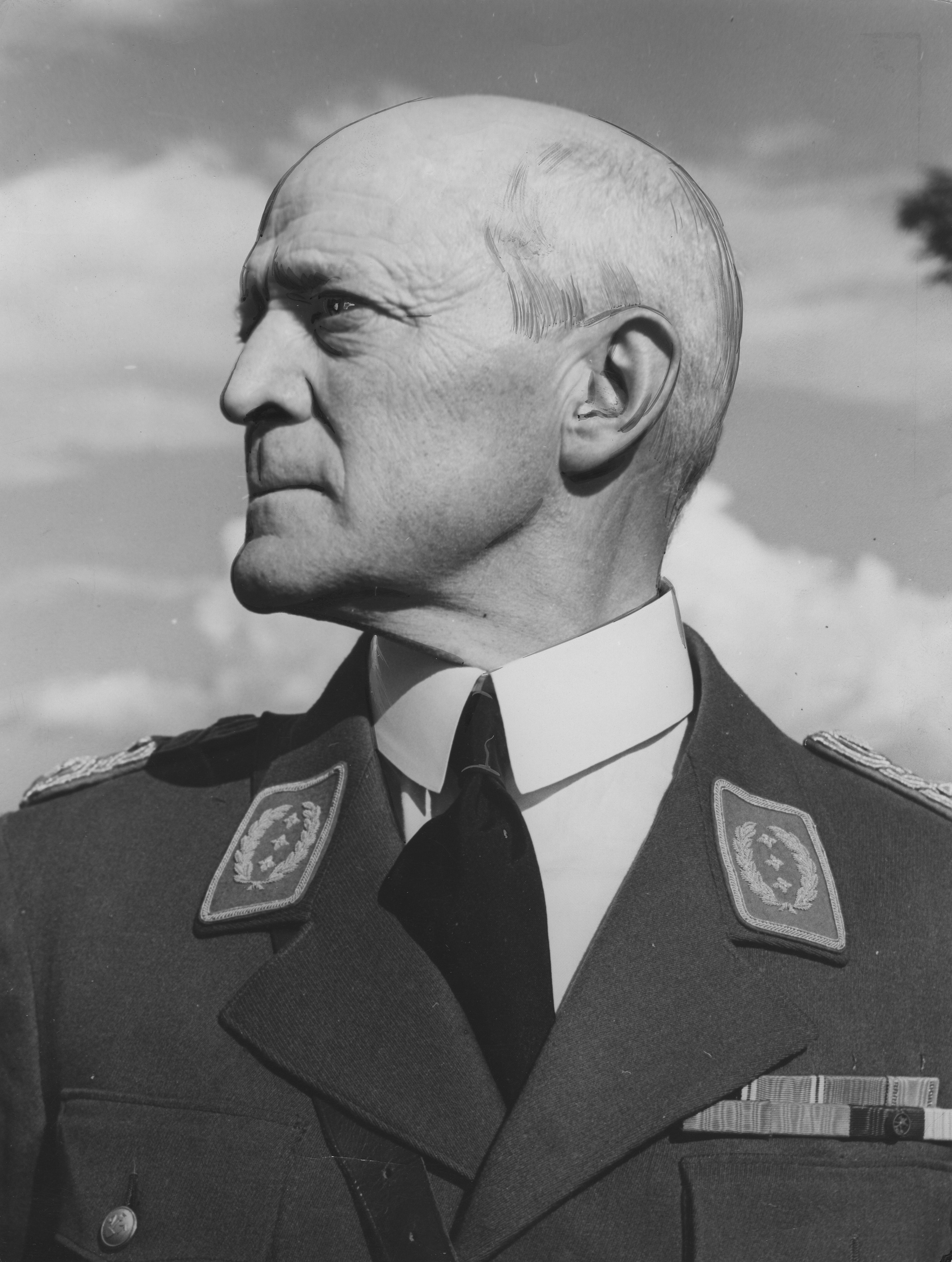
- Carl Frølich Hanssen in 1942
- Born: 8 January 1883; Fredrikshald, Norway
- Died: 6 January 1960 (aged 76)
- Occupations: Military officer and sports executive

Carl Frølich Hanssen (8 January 1883 – 6 January 1960) was a Norwegian military officer and sports executive. He was head of the Norwegian Nazi Labour Service during the Second World War. He born in Fredrikshald (Halden).

Before the Second World War he had a military career in the field artillery, eventually with the rank of colonel. During the German occupation of Norway he was head of the Norwegian Nazi Labour Service. In the legal purge in Norway after World War II he was sentenced to seven years imprisonment.

He won the Norwegian Football Cup with the club Mercantile in 1907 and 1912. He also represented the Norway national team on one occasion in 1910. He served as president of the Football Association of Norway for two periods, 1907–1908 and 1911–1912.
