= Olaf Olsen =

Olaf Olsen may refer to:

- Olaf Olsen (drummer) (born 1976), drummer of Norwegian rock band BigBang
- Olaf Olsen (footballer); see 1902 in Norwegian football
- Olaf C. Olsen (1899–?), Socialist legislator from Wisconsin
- Olaf H. Olsen (1928–2015), Danish archeologist
- Olaf L. Olsen (1881–1958), Republican legislator from Washington state
- Olaf M. Olsen (1909–1971), Norwegian chess player
- Olaf Nikolas Olsen (1794–1848), cartographer and Danish army officer
- Olaf Olsen (1919–2000), actor in the 1950 British film Lilli Marlene
- Olaf Olsen (fl. mid-20th century), Norwegian sea captain associated with the history of Rose au Rue, Newfoundland and Labrador, Canada

== See also ==
- Olsen (surname)
