= 1911 Norwegian Football Cup =

Norgesmesterskapet i fotball for menn 1911

Tournament details
- Country: Norway
- Teams: 9

Final positions
- Champions: Lyn (4th title)
- Runners-up: Urædd

Tournament statistics
- Matches played: 8
- Goals scored: 51 (6.38 per match)

The 1911 Norwegian Football Cup was the tenth season of the Norwegian annual knockout football tournament. The tournament was open for 1911 local association leagues (kretsserier) champions, and the defending champion, Lyn. Lyn won their fourth consecutive title, having beaten Urædd in the final.

== First round ==
Team 1	Score	Team 2
3 September 1911
Drafn	0–3	Fredrikstad

- The rest of the teams had a walkover.

== Second round ==
Team 1	Score	Team 2
19 September 1911
Lyn (Gjøvik)	0–9	Lyn
Urædd	3–2	Fredrikstad
Mercantile	5–0	Kvik (Trondheim)
Bergens FK	4–2	Stavanger

== Semi-finals ==
Team 1	Score	Team 2
1 October 1911
Lyn	3–0	Mercantile
Bergens FK	3–10	Urædd

== Final ==
8 October 1911

Lyn	5–2	Urædd
Unknown 42', 52' (?); Nysted 55' (pen.)	Report	Unknown (?)

Gamle Frogner, Kristiania
Attendance: 5,000
Referee: Ruben Gelbord (Sweden)

Lyn:
GK	Reidar Amble Ommundsen
DF	Paul Due
DF	Per Skou
MF	Erling Andersen
MF	Nikolai Ramm Østgaard
MF	Ragnar Waldrop
FW	Ragnvald Heyerdahl-Larsen
FW	Kristian Krefting
FW	Victor Nysted
FW	Erling Maartmann
FW	Rolf Maartmann

Urædd:
GK	Reidar Oth. Berg
DF	Ivan Abrahamsen
DF	Ralf Ording Helgesen
MF	Emil Olsen
MF	Conrad M. Carlsrud
MF	Lauritz Halvorsen
FW	Tellef Nilsen
FW	Michael Isaksen
FW	Jac. Brynhildsen
FW	Carl Pedersen
FW	Sigfred Pedersen

== See also ==
- 1911 in Norwegian football
