= 1911 in Norwegian football =

Football in Norway
Men's football
- NM: Lyn

Results from Norwegian football (soccer) in the year 1911.

== Class A of local association leagues ==
Class A of local association leagues (kretsserier) is the predecessor of a national league competition. The champions qualify for the 1911 Norwegian cup.

League	Champion
Smaalenene	Fredrikstad
Kristiania og omegn	Mercantile
Oplandene	Lyn (Gjøvik)
Vestfold	Drafn
Grenland	Urædd
Vesterlen	Stavanger IF
Bergen og omegn	Bergens FK
Nordenfjeldske	Kvik (Trondheim)

== Norwegian Cup ==
=== Final ===
8 October 1911

Lyn	5–2	Urædd
Unknown 42', 52' (?); Nysted 55' (pen.)	Report	Unknown (?)

Gamle Frogner, Kristiania
Attendance: 5,000
Referee: Ruben Gelbord (Sweden)

== National team ==
17 September 1911 Friendly	Sweden	4–1	Norway	Solna, Sweden
13:00 (UTC+1); Match 3	Ekroth 8', 35'; Börjesson 15'; Dahlström 47'	Report	Nysted 60'	Stadium: Råsunda IP; Attendance: 3,000; Referee: Nils Middelboe (Denmark)
