= Nikolai Ramm Østgaard =

Norwegian sportsperson (1885–1958)

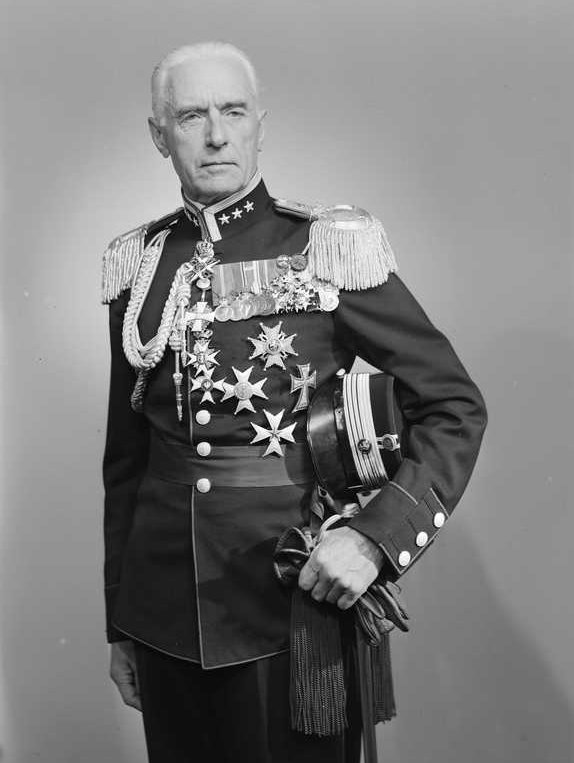
Østgaard in 1952

Nikolai Ramm Østgaard (30 October 1885 – 20 June 1958), sometimes referred to as N. R. Østgaard, was a Norwegian military officer, aide-de-camp for Olav V of Norway, and sports official who is best known as President of the International Ski Federation (FIS) from 1934 to 1951.

== Early and personal life ==
Østgaard was born in Kristiania as a son of merchant Einar Østgaard (1857–1907) and Karen Betzy Bredesen (1858–1938), and grandson of the writer Nikolai Ramm Østgaard. In July 1916 he married Ragni Gullichsen (1894–1956). One of their daughters married Erling Welle-Strand. He was the father of architect Rolf Ramm Østgaard.

He finished his secondary education in 1904 and graduated as a premier lieutenant from the Norwegian Military Academy in 1908. From 1908 to 1913 he taught physical education and mathematics in Kristiania, while he spent several winters as a ski coach in Central Europe.

== Sports career and royal service ==
In 1914 Østgaard became the personal trainer of Crown Prince Olav of Norway, by recommendation of his employer at school, Sigurd Halling. Østgaard was promoted to aide-de-camp for the Crown Prince in 1924, from the 1930s also with the administrative responsibility for the farm Skaugum. Also, his wife became mistress of the robes for the Crown Princess.

Østgaard was himself an able ski jumper and Nordic combined skier, and won three Norwegian football cups with his club SFK Lyn in 1908, 1910 and 1911. He chaired SFK Lyn from 1911 to 1912, and also Kristiania Skiing District Association (1909–1910) and the Norwegian Ski Federation (1927–1930). While serving in the latter position he became vice president of the International Ski Federation (1928–1934), later serving as president from 1934 to 1951. He was proclaimed honorary president upon backing down.

In the military Østgaard was promoted to captain in 1921, major in 1935 and lieutenant colonel in 1940. During the Norwegian campaign which followed the German invasion of Norway in April 1940, Østgaard served with the royal family in their flight northwards and then to the United Kingdom. He also followed the Crown Prince on his travels to North America. He was promoted to head aide-de-camp for the Crown Prince in 1945, from 1 January 1958 for the King of Norway as Olav was crowned as such. Østgaard held the rank of colonel from 1946. He also issued a book on Crown Princess Märtha of Norway in 1955 and edited a book on King Olav in 1957. Nikolai's son Einar (1929–2012) wrote two accounts on the royal family's flight in 1940; Reisen hun ikke ønsket (2005) and Kongen i krig (2009).

Østgaard was a Knight, Grand Cross of the Order of St. Olav (1957); Commander, First Class of the Order of the Dannebrog; Commander, Second Class of the Order of Vasa and the Order of the White Rose of Finland; Officer of the Order of the Crown; Knight, First Class of the Order of the Sword, and Knight of the Legion of Honour, the Order of the Polar Star, the Order of Polonia Restituta and the Order of the White Lion. He also held the Decoration of Honour for Services to the Republic of Austria in gold, the King's Medal of Merit in gold, the Haakon VII 25th Anniversary Medal and the King George VI Coronation Medal.

Sporting positions
Preceded by	Chairman of the Norwegian Ski Federation; 1927–1930	Succeeded by Olaf Helset
Preceded by Ivar Holmquist	President of the International Ski Federation; 1934–1951	Succeeded by Marc Hodler
