= Kenneth Stenild =

Danish footballer (born 1987)

Personal information
- Full name: Kenneth Stenild Nielsen
- Date of birth: 11 September 1987 (age 39)
- Place of birth: Denmark
- Height: 1.88 m (6 ft 2 in)
- Position: Goalkeeper

Team information
- Current team: Vejgaard BK (assistant)

Youth career
- AaB

Senior career*
Years	Team	Apps	(Gls)
2006–2009	AaB	11	(0)
2006–2007	→ FC Hjørring (loan)	0	(0)
2009–2012	AC Horsens	2	(0)
2012–2013	SønderjyskE	10	(0)
2013–2014	Vard Haugesund	11	(0)
2014–2019	Fram Larvik	148	(0)

International career
2002–2004	Denmark U-17	26	(0)
2004–2005	Denmark U-18	3	(0)
2005	Denmark U-19	4	(0)
2006	Denmark U-20	1	(0)

Managerial career
- 2020–: Vejgaard BK (assistant)
- * Club domestic league appearances and goals

Kenneth Stenild Nielsen (born 11 September 1987) is a Danish retired professional footballer.

== Career ==
He was regarded as one of the most talented goalkeepers in Denmark, having played 33 matches for various Danish youth national teams. At the age of 16 and 17 he attended trials at Premier League clubs Arsenal and Manchester United, but stated his willingness to remain at AaB.

Kenneth Stenild made his senior debut for AaB, when he played two games in the UEFA Intertoto Cup 2007 in July 2007.

=== Later career ===
After retiring from football at the end of 2019, Stenild became an assistant coach at Denmark Series club Vejgaard Boldspilklub.
