= Norwegian Museum of Science and Technology =

Museum in Oslo, Norway

Coordinates: 59°58′00″N 10°46′58″E

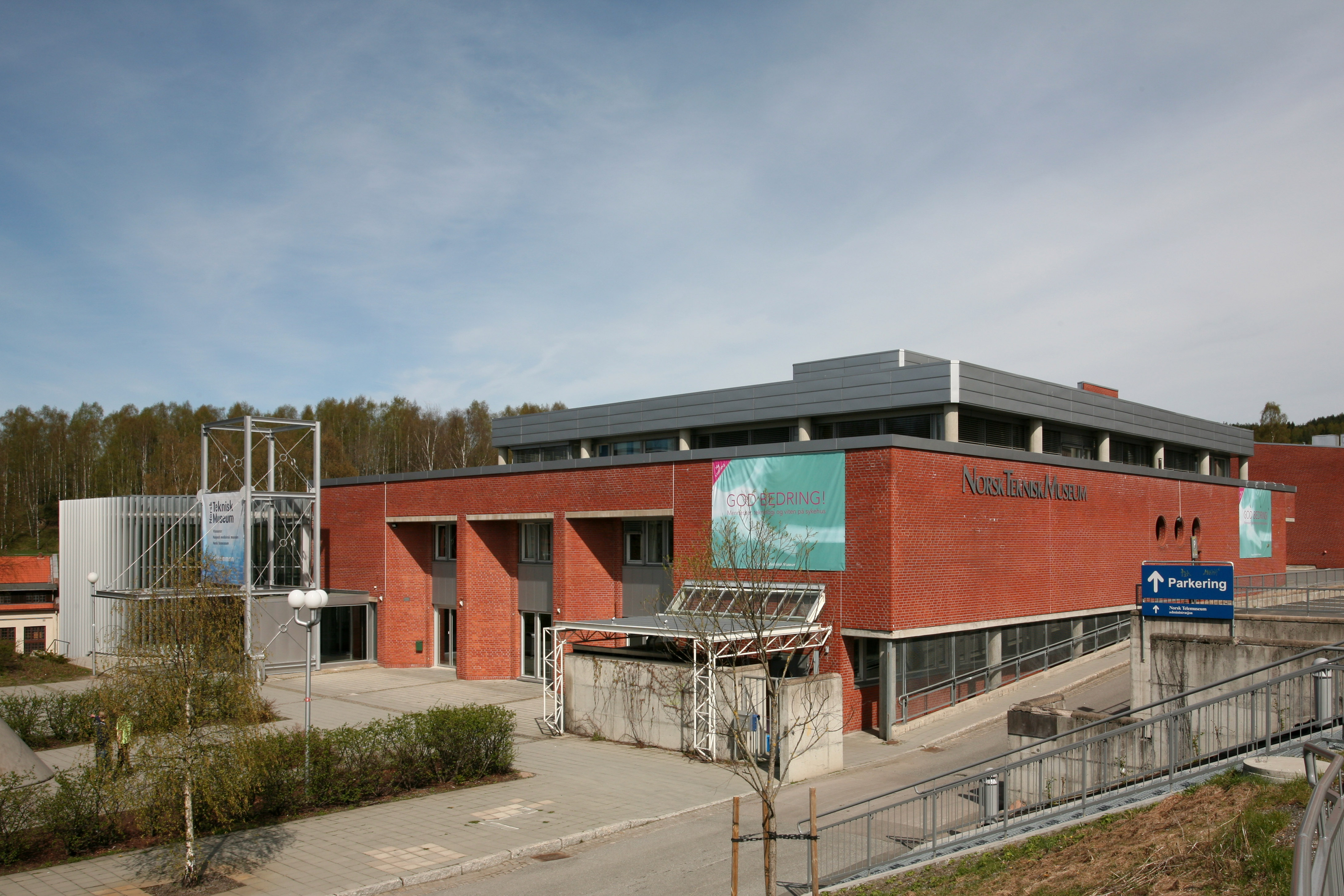
Norwegian Museum of Science and Technology

The Norwegian Museum of Science and Technology (Norwegian: Norsk Teknisk Museum) is located in Oslo, Norway. The museum is an anchor point on the European Route of Industrial Heritage.

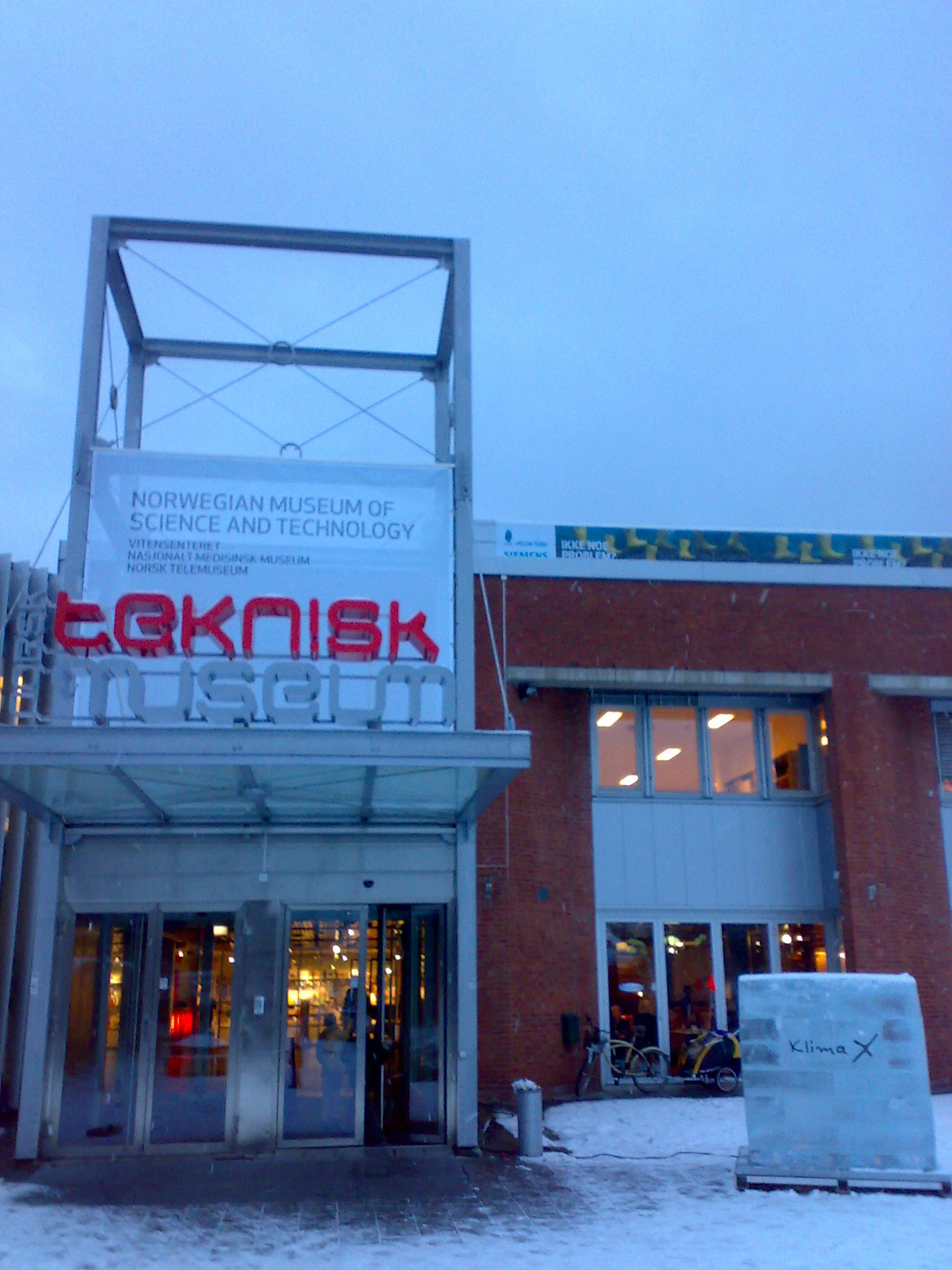
Norwegian Museum of Science and Technology at Kjelsås in Oslo

== History ==
The museum as an institution was founded in 1914 as a part of the commemoration for the 100th anniversary of the Norwegian Constitution, but it was not until 1932 that the museum was first opened, in the basement of the Viking Ship Museum in Bygdøy. In 1959 the museum relocated to Etterstad. Today's museum building at Kjelsås in Nordre Aker was designed by architect Rolf Ramm Østgaard and was officially opened in May 1986.

== Collections ==
The museum is an educational institution with collections, exhibitions, publications and other activities. The museum's objective is to demonstrate the implications of progress in science, technology, industry and medicine, socially and culturally, through the ages. Through its collections and exhibits the museum chronicles the development of Norway from an agrarian society to a complex industrial society. The museum contains permanent exhibitions on transport and aviation, Norwegian industrial history, energy and electricity, music machines, the oil, gas and plastics, wood and metal industries, clocks and watches, calculating machines and computers, as well as a science centre. In 2003 the National Museum of Medicine opened to the public.

The museum is home to what is probably the world’s oldest surviving Steamroller. Dating from 1878 it entered the museum straight from the Oslo road department.
