= 1908 Norwegian Football Cup =

Norgesmesterskapet i fotball for menn 1908
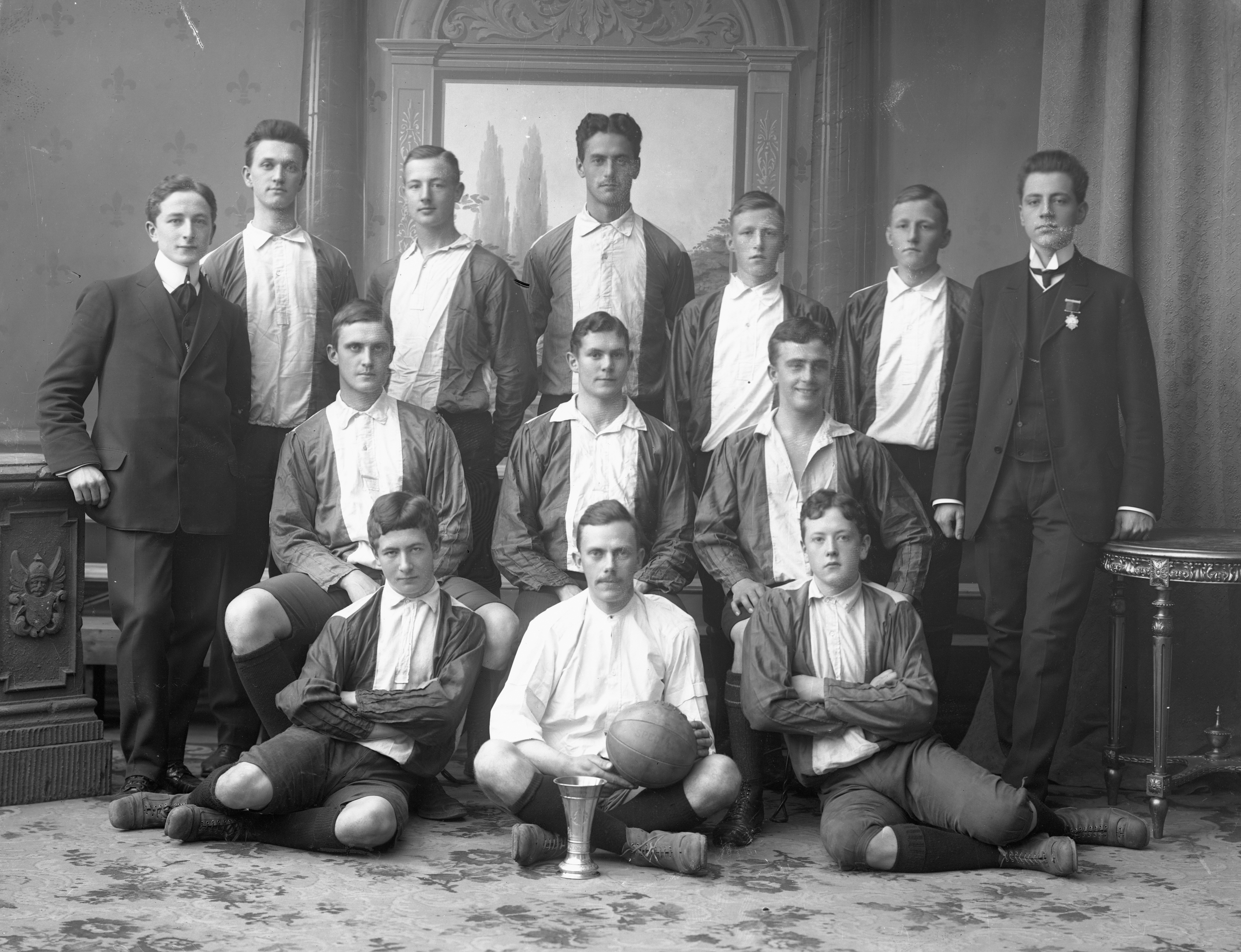

Tournament details
- Country: Norway
- Teams: 5

Final positions
- Champions: Lyn (1st title)
- Runners-up: Odd

Tournament statistics
- Matches played: 4
- Goals scored: 18 (4.5 per match)

The 1908 Norwegian Football Cup was the seventh season of the Norwegian annual knockout football tournament. The tournament was open for 1908 local association leagues (kretsserier) champions, except in Smaalene and Kristiania og omegn, where a separate cup qualifying tournament was held. Lyn won their first title.

== First round ==
Team 1	Score	Team 2
5 September 1908
Lyn	6–0	Lyn (Gjøvik)

- Odd, Kvik (Fredrikshald), Ørn received a bye.

== Semi-finals ==
Team 1	Score	Team 2
12 September 1908
Lyn	2–0	Ørn
Odd	5–0	Kvik (Fredrikshald)

== Final ==
13 September 1908

Lyn	3–2	Odd
	Report

Gamle Frogner, Kristiania
Referee: Charles Stanley Davis (Sarpsborg)

Lyn:
GK	August Heiberg Kahrs
DF	Olav Tygesen
DF	Hjalmar Syversen
MF	Erling Lorck
MF	Henrik Nordby
MF	Henning Wiese
FW	Knut Heyerdahl-Larsen
FW	Victor Nysted
FW	Nikolai Ramm Østgaard
FW	Erling Maartmann
FW	Rolf Maartmann

Odd:
GK	Jacob Abrahamsen
DF	Peder Henriksen
DF	Marius Lund
MF	Bernhart Halvorsen
MF	Frithjof Nilsen
MF	Øivind Stensrud
FW	Otto Olsen
FW	Bjarne Gulbrandsen
FW	Johan Nilsen
FW	Berthold Pettersen
FW	Daniel Gasman
