= Rolf Ramm Østgaard =

Norwegian architect (1923–2014)

- Born: 15 January 1923; Kristiania (now Oslo), Norway
- Died: 8 November 2014 (aged 91); Bærum, Norway
- Education: —
- Alma mater: Norwegian Institute of Technology
- Occupation: Architect
- Notable work: Norwegian Museum of Science and Technology in Oslo (1985)
- Parent: Nikolai Ramm Østgaard

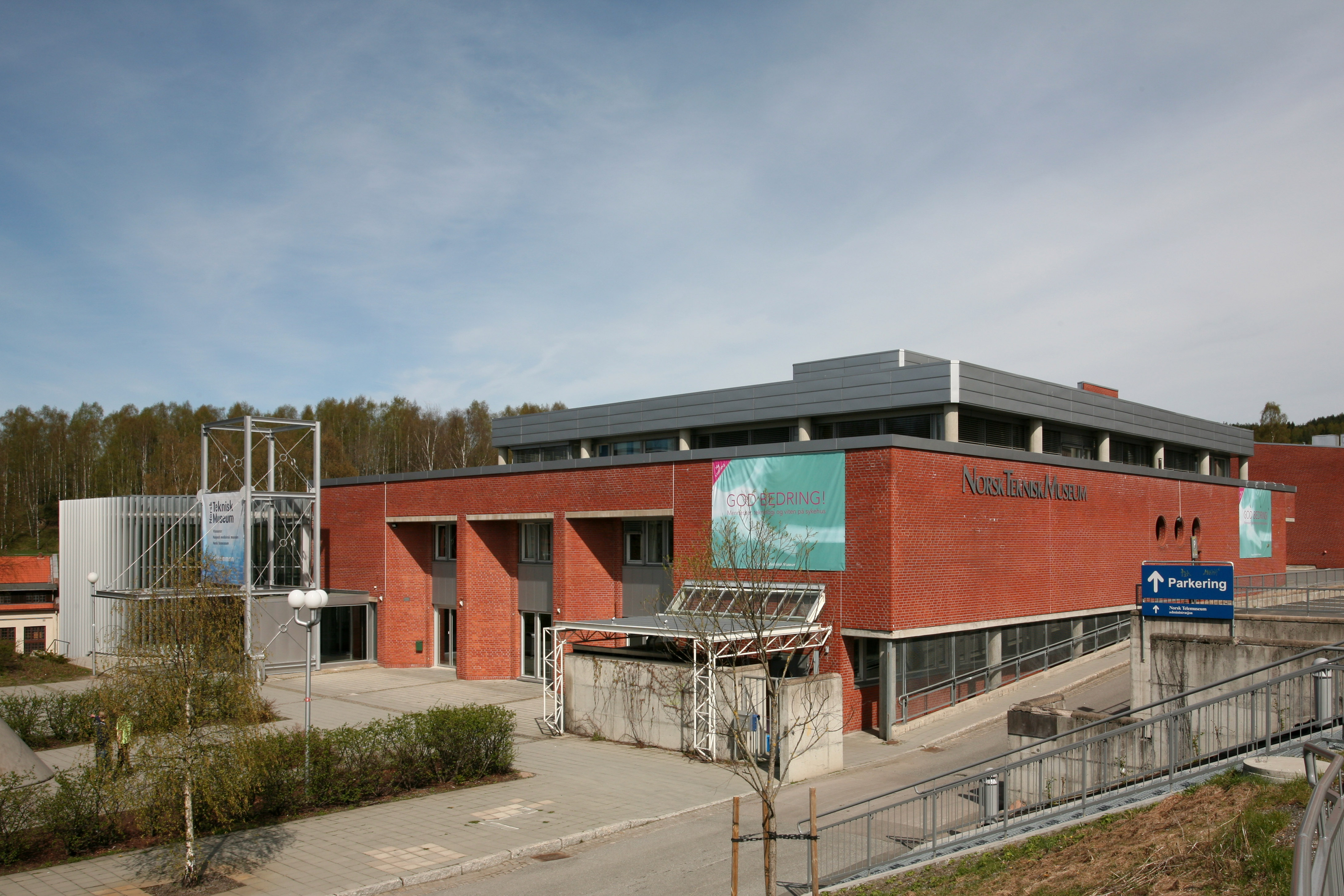
Norwegian Museum of Science and Technology

Rolf Ramm Østgaard (15 January 1923 – 8 November 2014) was a Norwegian architect.

== Personal life ==
Ramm Østgaard was born in Kristiania (now Oslo), Norway. He was the son of Nikolai Ramm Østgaard (1885-1958) and his wife Ragni Gullichsen (1894-1956). His father was a military officer and aide-de-camp for King Olav V of Norway. His mother served as lady-in-waiting to Princess Märtha of Sweden. He married Helene Bergland Ottesen in 1947.

== Career ==
Ramm Østgaard graduated from the Norwegian Institute of Technology in 1947. He served as an apprentice to Swedish architect Hakon Ahlberg (1942–43) and as assistant to architect Knut Bergersen in Trondheim (1946–47). He worked for Alvar Aalto (1947–1948) and for Erling Viksjø (1948–1952). He was employed at the Norwegian Directorate of Public Construction and Property (1952-1956). He established his own firm, Østgaard Arkitekter A/S (now Terje Grønmo Arkitekter A/S) in 1956.

His designs include the Norwegian Embassy in New Delhi (1960), the chemistry building at the University of Oslo (1968), the Norwegian Embassy in Beijing (1973), and the Norwegian Museum of Science and Technology in Oslo (1985). From 1968 to 1970 he served as president of the Association of Norwegian Architects.
