= 1903 in Norwegian football =

Football in Norway
Men's football
- NM: Odd

The 1903 season was the second season of competitive football in Norway. This page lists results from Norwegian football in 1903.

== Cup ==
=== Final ===
22 September 1903

Odd	1–0	Grane
Gasman	Report

Gamle Frogner, Kristiania
Referee: Finn Hagemann (Lyn)
