= 1905 in Norwegian football =

Football in Norway
Men's football
- NM: Odd

Results from Norwegian football in the year 1905.

== Cup ==
=== Final ===
10 September 1905

Odd	2–1	Akademisk FK
56'; 71'	Report	85'

Gamle Frogner, Kristiania
Attendance: 3,000
Referee: Arthur Nordlie (Lyn)

== Class A of local association leagues ==
The predecessor of a national league competition.

The champions qualified for the 1905 Norwegian Cup.

League	Champion
Smaalenene	Fredrikstad
Vestfold	Odd
