= 1915 Norwegian Football Cup =

Norgesmesterskapet i fotball for menn 1915

Tournament details
- Country: Norway
- Teams: 12

Final positions
- Champions: Odd (6th title)
- Runners-up: Kvik (Fredrikshald)

Tournament statistics
- Matches played: 11
- Goals scored: 70 (6.36 per match)

The 1915 Norwegian Football Cup was the 14th season of the Norwegian annual knockout football tournament. The tournament was open for 1915 local association leagues (kretsserier) champions. Odd won their sixth title, having beaten Kvik (Fredrikshald) in the final.

== First round ==
Team 1	Score	Team 2
12 September 1915
Brann	3–2 (a.e.t.)	Lyn
Grane (Arendal)	1–4	Brodd
Kvik (Trondhjem)	8–1	Rollon
Norrøna	1–5	Kvik (Fredrikshald)
Rjukan	2–6 (a.e.t.)	Ørn

- Odd and Lyn (Gjøvik) had a walkover.

== Second round ==
Team 1	Score	Team 2
26 September 1915
Brann	0–8	Kvik (Fredrikshald)
Lyn (Gjøvik)	1–8	Odd
Ørn	10–1	Brodd

- Kvik (Trondhjem) had a walkover.

== Semi-finals ==
Team 1	Score	Team 2
3 October 1915
Kvik (Trondhjem)	0–3	Kvik (Fredrikshald)
Ørn	0–3	Odd

== Final ==
10 October 1915

Odd	2–1	Kvik (Fredrikshald)
Thorstensen 5'; Gundersen 13'	Report	Helgesen 80'

Sarpsborg Stadion, Sarpsborg
Attendance: 6,000
Referee: Peder Christian Andersen (Kristiania BK)

Odd:
GK	Ingolf Pedersen
DF	Otto Aulie
DF	Per Skou
MF	Andreas Skou
MF	Peder Henriksen
MF	Bjarne Gulbrandsen
FW	Henry Reinholdt
FW	Nils Thorstensen
FW	Sverre Andersen
FW	Einar Gundersen
FW	Jonas Aas

Sarpsborg:
GK	Ole Paulsen
DF	Otto Klein
DF	Yngvar Tørnros
MF	Bakke
MF	Wilhelm Strand
MF	Karl Andersen
FW	Thomas Andersen
FW	Peder Puck
FW	Johnny Helgesen
FW	Rudolf Olsen
FW	Hartvig Olavesen

== See also ==
- 1915 in Norwegian football
