= Johan Lauritzen =

Norwegian footballer (1891-1967)

Personal information
- Date of birth: 9 June 1891
- Date of death: 9 December 1967 (aged 76)

International career
| Years | Team | Apps | (Gls) |
| 1913 | Norway | 1 | (1) |

Johan Lauritzen (9 June 1891 – 9 December 1967) was a Norwegian footballer. He played in one match for the Norway national football team in 1913.
