= 1902 in Norwegian football =

Football in Norway
Men's football
- NM: Sportsklubben Grane

The 1902 season was the first season of competitive football in Norway. This page lists results from Norwegian football in 1902.

== Cup ==
=== Final ===
16 June 1902

Grane	2–0	Odd
Thune-Larsen	Report

Gamle Frogner, Kristiania
Referee: Bredo Larsen (Lyn)
