= Sysoyeva, Perm Krai =

Sysoyeva Сысоева
- Village
- Location within Perm Krai Location within Russia
- Coordinates: 60°00′N 57°32′E
- Country: Russia
- Region: Perm Krai
- District: Krasnovishersky District
- Time zone: UTC+5:00

Sysoyeva (Russian: Сысоева) is a rural locality (a village) in Krasnovishersky District, Perm Krai, Russia. The population was 1 as of 2010.

== Geography ==
Sysoyeva is located 174 km southeast of Krasnovishersk (the district's administrative centre) by road. Antipina is the nearest rural locality.
