= Alf Flinth =

Norwegian footballer (1897-1982)

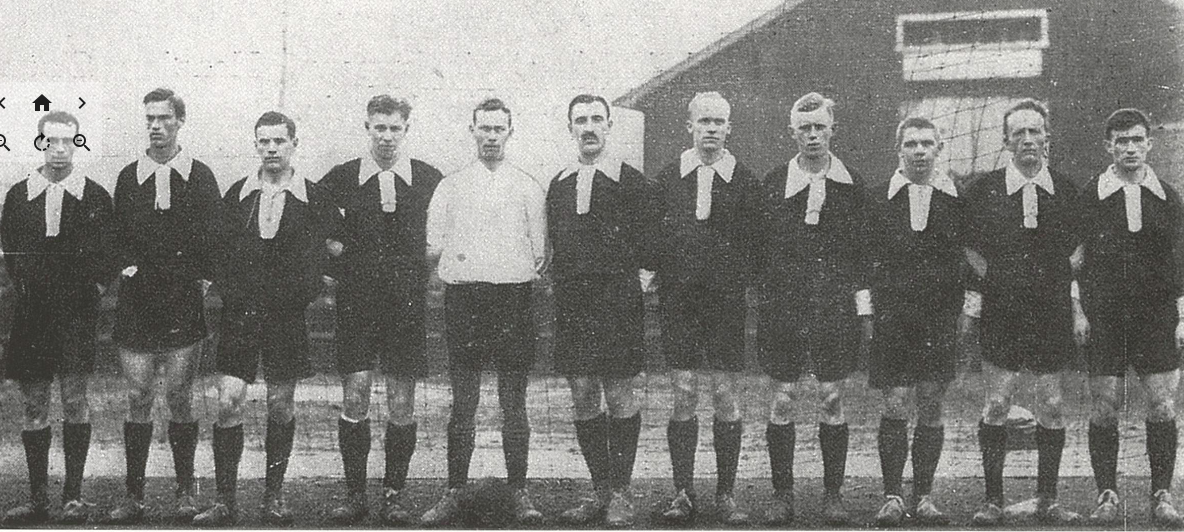
- Alf is number two from the left, in this picture from 13 Octobre 1918, when his team Kvik Halden FK won the 1918 Norwegian Football Cup.

Personal information
- Date of birth: 2 January 1897
- Place of birth: Fredrikshald, Norway
- Date of death: 5 August 1982 (aged 85)
- Position: Midfielder

International career
Years	Team	Apps	(Gls)
1924–1927	Norway	6	(0)

Alf Flinth (2 January 1897 – 5 August 1982) was a Norwegian footballer. He played in six matches for the Norway national football team from 1924 to 1927. He played for the Kvik Halden FK soccer team.
