= Einar Friis Baastad =

Norwegian footballer (1890-1974)

Einar Friis Baastad (8 May 1890 – 1 September 1974) was a Norwegian football player. He was born in Kristiania. He played for the Norwegian national team, and competed at the 1912 Summer Olympics in Stockholm. He was Norwegian champion with the club Mercantile in 1907 and 1912.
