= Valentin Sysoyev =

Russian footballer

Personal information
- Full name: Valentin Vasilyevich Sysoyev
- Date of birth: 1887
- Date of death: 1971 (aged 83–84)
- Position: Striker

Senior career*
Years	Team	Apps	(Gls)
1909–1914	ZKS Moscow		

International career
1913	Russia	1	(1)
- * Club domestic league appearances and goals

Valentin Vasilyevich Sysoyev (Russian: Валентин Васильевич Сысоев) (born in 1887; died in 1971) was a Russian football player.

== Career ==
In 1908, Sysoyev was introduced to football at age 22, while at his parents' dacha in Rastorguevo a visiting Englishman explained the rules to his neighbors. Sysoyev would be one of the first players at newly-formed "ZKS" football club in the Zamoskvorechye District of Moscow.

== International career ==
Sysoyev played his only game for Russia on September 14, 1913 in a friendly against Norway and scored a goal in a 1:1 tie.
