= Harald Johansen =

Norwegian footballer (1887-1965)

Harald Johansen (9 October 1887 – 11 July 1965) was a Norwegian football player. He was born in Fredrikstad. He played for the club Mercantile, and for the Norwegian national team. He competed at the 1912 Summer Olympics in Stockholm. He was Norwegian champion with the club Mercantile in 1907 and 1912.
