= Per Skou =

Norwegian footballer, sports official and businessperson

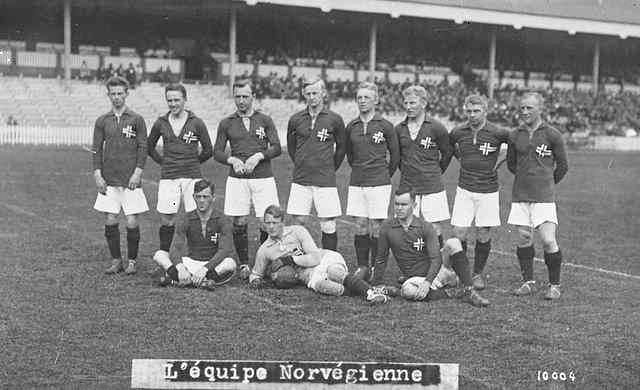
The Norwegian national football team - 1920 Olympics.

Per Skou (20 May 1891 – 24 February 1962) was a Norwegian footballer, sports official and businessperson.

He was born in Skien. He played left back for Odd and Lyn, and became Norwegian cup champion three times – with Lyn in 1911 and with Odd in 1913 and 1915. He was capped 41 times for the Norwegian national team. During this period he featured in two Olympic Games, the 1912 and 1920 Summer Olympics. His last senior game for Lyn came in 1929.

He was the president of the Football Association of Norway from 1930 to 1934. He started as a board member in 1927 and was the vice president in 1929. From 1930 to 1932 he was a board member of the Norwegian Confederation of Sports. He was the first honorary member of the Football Association of Norway.

Outside of sports, he worked in Centralbanken for one year after finishing his secondary education in 1910. In 1911 he was hired in Union Co. In addition to being office manager here, he was a member of the insurance commission in the Federation of Norwegian Industries.

Sporting positions
Preceded by Jacob Ramm	President of the Football Association of Norway; 1930–1934	Succeeded by
