= 1975 Norwegian First Division =

31st season of top-tier football league in Norway

1. divisjon
- Season: 1975
- Dates: 27 April – 19 October
- Champions: Viking; 5th title
- Relegated: Skeid; Vålerengen; Os
- European Cup: Viking
- UEFA Cup: Brann; Start
- Matches: 132
- Goals: 336 (2.55 per match)
- Top goalscorer: Arne Dokken (18 goals)
- Biggest home win: Viking 6–0 Fredrikstad (8 May 1975)
- Biggest away win: Fredrikstad 2–6 Rosenborg (28 July 1975)
- Highest scoring: Fredrikstad 2–6 Rosenborg (28 July 1975)
- Longest winning run: Mjøndalen (6 games)
- Longest unbeaten run: Brann (9 games)
- Longest winless run: Os (22 games)
- Longest losing run: Os (10 games)
- Highest attendance: 16,516; Start 0–1 Viking (31 August 1975)
- Lowest attendance: 1,183; Skeid 2–2 Molde (19 October 1975)
- Average attendance: 6,772 ▲17.8%

The 1975 1. divisjon was the 31st completed season of top division football in Norway.

== Overview ==
It was contested by 12 teams, and Viking FK won the championship, their fourth consecutive league title and their fifth top-flight title overall.

== Teams and locations ==
Note: Table lists in alphabetical order.

Team	Ap.	Location	Stadium
Brann	23	Bergen	Brann Stadion
Fredrikstad	29	Fredrikstad	Fredrikstad Stadion
Lillestrøm	12	Lillestrøm	Åråsen Stadion
Mjøndalen	9	Mjøndalen	Nedre Eiker Stadion
Molde	4	Molde	Molde Stadion
Os	1	Osøyro	Kuventræ Stadion
Rosenborg	13	Trondheim	Lerkendal Stadion
Skeid	28	Oslo	
Start	8	Kristiansand	Kristiansand Stadion
Strømsgodset	10	Drammen	Marienlyst Stadion
Vålerengen	21	Oslo	Bislett Stadion
Viking	28	Stavanger	Stavanger Stadion

== League table ==
Pos	Team	Pld	W	D	L	GF	GA	GD	Pts	Qualification or relegation
1	Viking (C)	22	12	6	4	38	20	+18	30	Qualification for the European Cup first round
2	Brann	22	10	7	5	36	27	+9	27	Qualification for the UEFA Cup first round
3	Start	22	11	5	6	29	20	+9	27	Qualification for the UEFA Cup first round
4	Rosenborg	22	11	5	6	36	28	+8	27	
5	Strømsgodset	22	10	4	8	39	27	+12	24	
6	Mjøndalen	22	9	6	7	21	21	0	24	
7	Lillestrøm	22	10	3	9	27	20	+7	23	
8	Molde	22	7	8	7	27	29	−2	22	
9	Fredrikstad	22	8	6	8	31	35	−4	22	
10	Skeid (R)	22	5	7	10	18	23	−5	17	Relegation to Second Division
11	Vålerengen (R)	22	3	10	9	19	36	−17	16	Relegation to Second Division
12	Os (R)	22	0	5	17	15	50	−35	5	Relegation to Second Division

Source: NIFS
Rules for classification: 1) points; 2) goal difference; 3) number of goals scored.
(C) Champions; (R) Relegated

== Results ==
Home \ Away	BRA	FRE	LIL	MIF	MOL	OS	ROS	SKE	IKS	STM	VIK	VÅL
Brann	—	1–1	0–1	0–1	0–2	2–1	2–0	2–1	3–3	1–1	0–0	3–0
Fredrikstad	1–1	—	0–1	3–1	2–2	3–0	2–6	0–1	1–2	1–1	2–2	1–1
Lillestrøm	0–1	1–2	—	4–0	1–2	2–0	1–0	0–1	0–0	0–1	1–0	1–3
Mjøndalen	0–1	0–2	3–1	—	1–1	2–0	1–0	1–0	1–0	0–2	0–0	2–2
Molde	1–3	0–2	1–2	0–2	—	1–0	1–0	0–1	1–1	2–2	2–1	0–0
Os	2–4	1–2	0–4	0–0	1–1	—	3–4	1–1	1–2	1–4	0–1	1–1
Rosenborg	2–2	2–1	1–0	1–1	3–2	1–0	—	2–0	2–0	2–0	3–3	1–1
Skeid	1–1	1–2	0–3	0–0	2–2	0–0	0–1	—	0–0	3–1	0–1	0–0
Start	2–0	1–0	2–0	1–0	3–1	4–1	1–0	3–2	—	0–1	0–1	1–1
Strømsgodset	2–5	3–0	1–2	1–2	1–1	6–1	2–3	1–0	2–0	—	3–0	3–0
Viking	5–1	6–0	1–1	2–0	1–2	2–0	3–0	2–1	2–1	2–1	—	2–2
Vålerengen	0–3	1–3	1–1	0–3	0–2	3–1	2–2	0–3	0–2	1–0	0–1	—

Source: nifs.no (in Norwegian)
Legend: Blue = home team win; Yellow = draw; Red = away team win.

== Season statistics ==
=== Top scorer ===
- (Norway) Arne Dokken, Lillestrøm – 18 goals

=== Attendances ===
Pos	Team	Total	High	Low	Average	Change
1	Brann	139,246	14,966	8,968	12,659	+26.2%
2	Viking	115,151	13,889	7,039	10,468	+1.8%
3	Rosenborg	105,640	12,300	5,400	9,604	+24.9%
4	Strømsgodset	101,823	14,358	5,884	9,257	+16.4%
5	Start	79,453	16,516	3,225	7,223	+3.8%
6	Lillestrøm	66,727	9,800	3,550	6,066	n/a^{2}
7	Vålerengen	64,710	15,514	2,034	5,883	−17.9%
8	Fredrikstad	62,310	9,600	3,536	5,665	n/a^{2}
9	Skeid	48,014	8,256	1,183	4,365	+13.4%
10	Molde	41,854	5,200	2,669	3,805	−28.1%
11	Mjøndalen	37,173	6,350	1,250	3,379	+31.1%
12	Os	31,773	7,400	1,400	2,888	n/a^{2}
	League total	893,874	16,516	1,183	6,772	+21.1%

Source: nifs.no
Notes:
2: Team played last season in 2. divisjon.
