= Minotti Bøhn =

Norwegian footballer (1888-1975)

Personal information
- Full name: Conrad Norman Minotti Bøhn
- Date of birth: 14 May 1888
- Date of death: 6 June 1975 (aged 87)

International career
Years	Team	Apps	(Gls)
1908	Norway	1	(2)

Minotti Bøhn (14 May 1888 – 6 June 1975) was a Norwegian footballer. He played in one match for the Norway national football team in 1908.
