= Hans Endrerud =

Norwegian footballer (1885-1957)

Hans Endrerud (13 October 1885 – 24 October 1957) was a Norwegian football player. He was born in Kristiania. He played for the club Mercantile, and for the Norwegian national team. He competed at the 1912 Summer Olympics in Stockholm. He was Norwegian champion with the club Mercantile in 1907 and 1912.
