= IF Fram Larvik =

Norwegian sports club

Fram Larvik
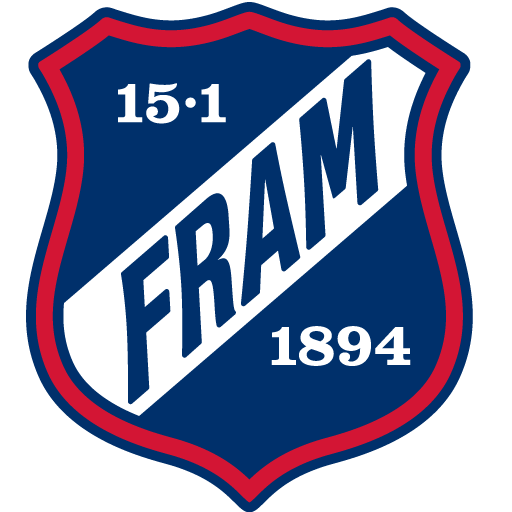
- Full name: Idrettsforeningen Fram
- Nickname: Fram
- Founded: 15 January 1894; 132 years ago
- Ground: Framparken
- Head coach: Haakon Lunov
- League: 3. divisjon
- 2024: 3. divisjon group 2, 4th of 14
- Website: https://iffram.no
Home colours	Away colours

Idrettsforeningen Fram, better known as Fram Larvik to distinguish it from other sport clubs, is a sports club from Torstrand in Larvik, Norway. It has sections for association football, athletics, handball and speed skating.

== General history ==
The club was founded on 15 January 1894. That makes Fram Norway's oldest existing association football club. It is often known as Fram Larvik, mainly to distinguish it from IL Fram from Skatval.

== Football ==
The men's football team currently plays in the Norwegian Third Division, the fourth tier of the Norwegian football league system.

The club reached the final of the 1912 Norwegian Cup. Fram won the final 2–1, but the opponent Mercantile claimed that Fram had used an illegit player. The Norwegian FA ruled a replay the next weekend. On 20 October 1912, Fram lost the replay 0–6 against Mercantile at Gamle Frogner Stadion in Kristiania. The club's greatest achievement came in 1950, when the club won the 1949–50 Hovedserien, the Norwegian top division. Fram played in the Second Division to 1995, but was down to the 4. divisjon for a period after relegation in the 1999 3. divisjon campaign. After that, the team was remade to Larvik Fotball, which won several promotions and resided in the 2. divisjon for some years. The cooperation club Larvik Fotball ceased to exist in late 2004, and the 2005 2. divisjon was played as IF Fram, but with abysmal results. After a few seasons back in the 3. divisjon, however, Fram won the league in 2008 and the subsequent playoffs, and has played in the 2. divisjon since. Petter Belsvik took over as head coach after the 2013 season from Tom Helge Jacobsen. In 2021 Haakon Lunov is head coach of Fram Football arter signing a two-year contract.

Notable footballers include Tom Rüsz Jacobsen, Kenneth Stenild, Lars Bakkerud, Freddy Ørbeck Jonny Hansen, former Swedish u21 international Andreas Drugge and Sverre Hansen.

=== Honours ===
- Norwegian top flight:
  - Winners (1): 1949–50
- Norwegian Football Cup:
  - Runners-up (1): 1912

=== Recent seasons ===
Season	Division	Pos.	Pl.	W	D	L	GS	GA	P	Cup	Notes
2005	2. divisjon	↓ 14	26	4	5	17	25	90	17	Second round	Relegated
2006	3. divisjon	8	22	7	7	8	53	39	28	First qualifying round	
2007	3. divisjon	1	22	14	4	4	66	28	46	First qualifying round	Lost promotion play-off
2008	3. divisjon	↑ 1	22	20	1	1	75	22	61	Second round	Won promotion play-off
2009	2. divisjon	8	26	10	3	13	47	69	33	First round	
2010	2. divisjon	11	26	9	6	11	45	53	33	First round	
2011	2. divisjon	11	26	7	6	13	34	56	38	First round	
2012	2. divisjon	6	26	10	6	10	39	37	36	First round	
2013	2. divisjon	3	26	14	8	4	62	34	50	First round	
2014	2. divisjon	3	26	15	4	7	52	41	49	Second round	
2015	2. divisjon	4	26	13	8	5	60	42	47	Second round	
2016	2. divisjon	6	26	13	2	11	58	46	41	Second round	
2017	2. divisjon	5	26	12	6	8	49	43	42	First round	
2018	2. divisjon	10	26	9	2	15	40	57	29	Second round	
2019	2. divisjon	5	26	12	7	7	50	34	43	Quarterfinal	
2020	2. divisjon	14	13	1	3	9	17	41	6	Cancelled	
2021	2. divisjon	↓ 12	26	6	9	11	33	42	27	Second round	Relegated
2022	3. divisjon	↑ 1	26	18	7	1	60	20	61	Second round	Promoted
2023	2. divisjon	↓ 13	26	6	7	13	37	57	25	First round	Relegated
2024	3. divisjon	4	26	16	5	5	64	44	53	Second round	

== Players ==
=== Current squad ===
As of 1 September 2023

Note: Flags indicate national team as defined under FIFA eligibility rules; some limited exceptions apply. Players may hold more than one non-FIFA nationality.

No.	Pos.	Nation	Player
1	GK	POR	Jorge Vieira
2	DF	NOR	Ola Strand
3	DF	NOR	Markus Rekdal
4	DF	NOR	Jonathan Rydjord Pettersen
5	DF	NOR	Liiban Abdi Ahmed
7	MF	NOR	Petter Nilssen Einarsson
8	MF	NOR	Pa-Modou Jatta
9	FW	SWE	Marcus Fählgren Hallström
10	MF	NOR	Mahmoud Laham
11	MF	SWE	Neo Drugge Hysén
12	GK	POL	Jeremi Kamecki
13	MF	NOR	Oliver Armando Helgeland
15	MF	NOR	Marius Jacobsen

No.	Pos.	Nation	Player
16	DF	NOR	Jørgen Kili Fjeldskår (on loan from Sandefjord)
17	MF	NOR	Jonas Bruusgaard
18	DF	NOR	Philip Jonhaugen Ask
19	FW	NOR	Isak Solvik Nilsen
21	FW	NOR	Martin Henriksen
22	MF	NOR	Uno Kristian Pedersen
23	FW	NOR	Erik Nordengen
24	MF	NOR	Riel Chol Nguen
25	MF	NOR	Brian Lysebo Johansen
27	MF	COL	Brahian Stiven Mosquera
28	DF	NOR	Pedro de Souza
30	DF	NOR	Martin Wurschmidt

== Handball ==
The club also have a handball team, that plays in the First Division, the second highest tier in men's handball. Ole Kristian Strøm is the coach, and they play their matches in Framhallen.

Notable handballers include Eivind Ellingsen, Pål Myrdam, Are Ruud and Tom Bakke.

== Speed skating ==
Notable speed skaters in Fram include Bjørg Eva Jensen, Tom Erik Oxholm, Roger Strøm, Else Marie Christiansen, Minna Nystedt, Anne Therese Tveter, Bjørn Tveter and Øyvind Tveter.
