= Mercantile SFK =

Norwegian football club

Mercantile
- Full name: Mercantile Ski- og Fotballklubb
- Founded: 3 June 1903; 122 years ago
- Ground: Langerud
- League: 7. divisjon, group 3
- 2018: 7. divisjon, group 3, 5th of 9
Home colours	Away colours

Mercantile Ski- og Fotballklubb is a Norwegian football club from Oslo, Norway. Founded on 3 June 1903, the club currently plays in 7. divisjon, the eighth tier of the Norwegian football league system. The club formerly had sections for bandy, handball, ice hockey and skiing.

== History ==
Mercantile Ski- og Fotballklubb was founded on 3 June 1903 by av Hans Chr. Endrerud, Einar Maartmann and Sverre Strand. In the early years, the club dominated local football in Oslo and even in national competition. The first eighth county championships (In Norwegian:kretsmesterskap) were won by Mercantile between 1906 and 1913. Mercantile became Norwegian Champions in 1907 and 1912 as winners of the Norwegian Cup. When Norway played its first international match, nine of the players were represented by Mercantile SFK. Minotti Bøhn, the first Norway national team goalscorer was one of these nine Mercantile players.

90 years after its foundation, the club thrived in the 2. divisjon, the third tier. Following relegation in 1994 the club won promotion from the 1996 3. divisjon, but faced straight relegation again in 1997. In 2001 Mercantile was a serious contestant for promotion, but finished behind Grindvoll, only to win its 2002 3. divisjon department and also the playoff against Mjøndalen. The club then had a run in the 2. divisjon from 2003 to 2005.

In November 2006, the club's football department (Mercantile Fotballklubb) merged with Nordstrand IF, which led to Nordstrand taking over Mercantile's first team in the 3. divisjon (fourth tier). 28 November 2007, Mercantile Ski- og Fotballklubb decided to restart a team in the 8. division led by Kent Jonas Trinborg and Skjalg Sæther.

== Honours ==
- Norwegian Cup
  - Winners: 1907, 1912
  - Runners-up:1913

== Recent history ==
Season		Pos.	Pl.	W	D	L	GS	GA	P	Cup	Notes
2015	7. divisjon	4	16	7	0	9	37	39	21	dnq	
2016	7. divisjon	5	18	7	5	6	41	38	26	dnq	
2017	7. divisjon	8	14	2	1	11	24	52	7	dnq	
2018	7. divisjon	5	16	6	3	7	30	34	21	dnq	

== Sports ==
- Football: 1903–present
- Skiing: 1903–1975
- Bandy: 1908–1952
- Ice hockey: 1952–1959
- Handball (women): 1938–1951, 1992–1996
- Handball (men): 1945–1996
