= Eliteserien play-offs =

Norwegian football league play-offs

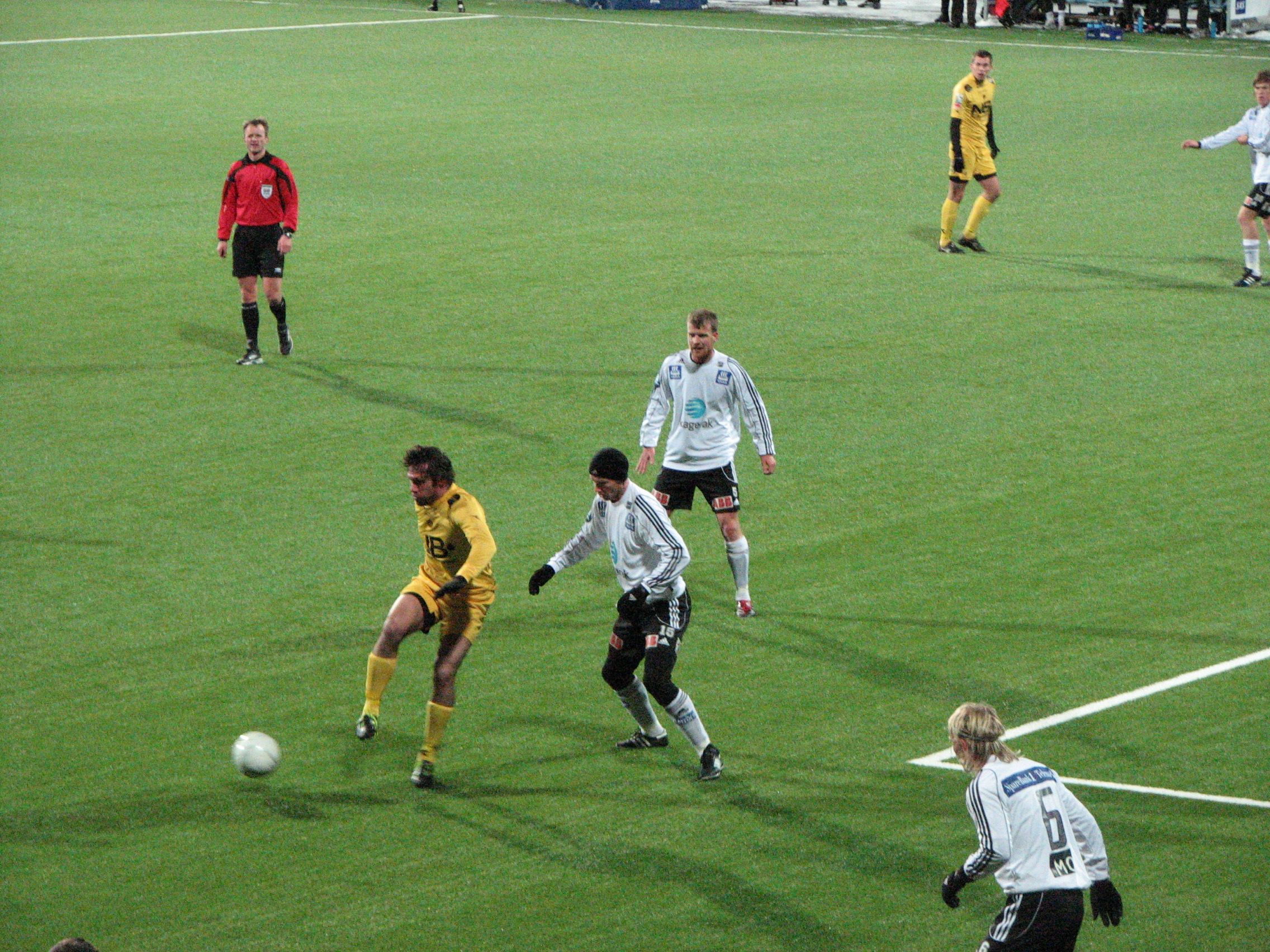
The 2008 return match between Bodø/Glimt and Odd Grenland at Aspmyra Stadion. Bodø/Glimt won the match 3–2, securing 4–2 overall and becoming the first team since 2000 to advance to the top league via the play-off.

The Eliteserien, until 1991 known as the 1. divisjon and between 1991 and 2016 known as Tippeligaen, has employed a system of play-off qualification to determine promotion and relegation with the 1. divisjon (until 1991 the 2. divisjon). Various varieties have been in place since the system was introduced at the end of the 1972 season, but only one team has been promoted per year. The play-offs have always supplemented a system of direct promotion and relegation of two teams. The play-offs have been wavered twice, in the 1994 and 2011 seasons, when the top league was expanded to fourteen and sixteen teams, respectively.

Sogndal have participated ten times, more than any other team. Start (four times) and Stabæk (twice) are the only teams to have participated more than once and always won. The least successful teams who have participated three times or more and never won the tournament are Pors (four times), Sandefjord and Ull/Kisa (both three times). Teams from the top league have participated 35 times, and have succeeded at retaining their place in 20 occasions.

== Format ==
Play-offs were introduced in the 1972, when the 1. divisjon was expanded from ten to twelve teams. The 2. divisjon consisted of two conferences, and the winners of each conference were promoted directly. The runners-up met the winner of a conference from Northern Norway, with the three teams playing a single round-robin to determine the third and final promotion spot. Three teams were relegated from the 1. divisjon. This system remained for seven years, before the separate conferences for Northern Norway were abolished. From 1979 the play-offs were played as a two-tier match between the two conference runners-up, a system which was used for two seasons.

From 1981 the system returned to a three-team single round robin, although this time the two 2. divisjon runners-up met the team finishing tenth in the 1. divisjon. The format remained for thirteen years, with six top level teams succeeding in retaining their place. No play-off was played in 1994, as the top flight was increased to fourteen teams and both the winners and runners-up of both 1. divisjon conferences were promoted, while only two top flight teams were relegated.

From 1995 the play-off solely involved a two-tier match between the runners-up of the 1. divisjon conferences, with three teams from the top flight meeting relegation. This system remained for two years, before 1997, when the 1. divisjon was merged to a single conference. For twelve years the play-off was played as a two-tier game between the team finishing twelfth in the top flight and the team finishing third in the 1. divisjon. In this period the top level teams defended their positions nine times, including every year from 2001 through 2006.

From 2009 the play-off has been played as a knock-out tournament. The first two years saw the teams ranked three through five in the 1. divisjon meet the team ranked twelfth in the top flight in a two-round knock-out, with a single match in the first round and double match in the second round. In 2009 the top flight was extended to sixteen teams: three teams were promoted and only one relegated. In 2011, no play-off was carried out. From 2012 the play-offs returned as a three-round knock-out tournament. The teams ranked three to six in the 1. divisjon played each other in a two-round, single-match knock-out tournament, with the winner facing the fourteenth-placed top flight team in a two-legged decisive final.

== By season ==
The following is a list of seasons, listing the winning team, the relegated team should the top level contestant fail to win, and teams failing to be promoted.

*	Team from the top league

Season	Winner	Relegated	Not promoted	Ref
1972	Raufoss	—	Pors, Mo	
1973	Vålerengen	—	Bryne, Mjølner	
1974	Fredrikstad	—	Eidsvold Turn, Bodø/Glimt	
1975	Vard Haugesund	—	Odd, Bodø/Glimt	
1976	Bodø/Glimt	—	Lyn, Odd	
1977	Steinkjer	—	Odd, Mo	
1978	HamKam	—	Fredrikstad, Tromsø	
1979	Molde	—	Pors	
1980	Haugar	—	Mjøndalen	
1981	Molde	Brann*	Pors	
1982	Eik-Tønsberg	Fredrikstad*	Steinkjer	
1983	Strindheim	Brann*	Pors	
1984	Moss*	—	HamKam, Vidar	
1985	Tromsø	Moss*	Sogndal	
1986	Tromsø*	—	Drøbak/Frogn, Vidar	
1987	Djerv 1919	HamKam*	Lyn	
1988	Start	Bryne*	HamKam	
1989	Vålerengen*	—	Djerv 1919, HamKam	
1990	Lillestrøm*	—	Bryne, Eik-Tønsberg	
1991	Brann*	—	Bryne, Strindheim	
1992	HamKam*	—	Drøbak/Frogn, Strømmen	
1993	Strømsgodset	Molde*	Bryne	
1995	Strømsgodset	—	Sogndal	
1996	Sogndal	—	Odd Grenland	
1997	Tromsø*	—	Eik-Tønsberg	
1998	Kongsvinger*	—	Kjelsås	
1999	Start	Strømsgodset*	—	
2000	Sogndal	Vålerenga*	—	
2001	Bryne*	—	HamKam	
2002	Brann*	—	Sandefjord	
2003	Vålerenga*	—	Sandefjord	
2004	Bodø/Glimt*	—	Kongsvinger	
2005	Molde*	—	Moss	
2006	Odd Grenland*	—	Bryne	
2007	Bodø/Glimt	Odd Grenland*	—	
2008	Aalesund*	—	Sogndal	
2009	Kongsvinger	Fredrikstad*	Sogndal, Sarpsborg 08	
2010	Fredrikstad	Hønefoss*	Løv-Ham, Ranheim	
2012	Sandnes Ulf*	—	Sandefjord, Mjøndalen, Bodø/Glimt, Ullensaker/Kisa	
2013	Sarpsborg 08*	—	Ranheim, Mjøndalen, Hødd, HamKam	
2014	Mjøndalen	Brann*	Bærum, Kristiansund, Fredrikstad	
2015	Start*	—	Jerv, Kristiansund, Hødd, Ranheim	
2016	Stabæk*	—	Jerv, Sandnes Ulf, Kongsvinger, Mjøndalen	
2017	Ranheim	Sogndal*	Mjøndalen, Sandnes Ulf, Ull/Kisa	
2018	Stabæk*	—	Aalesund, Sogndal, Ull/Kisa, Nest-Sotra	
2019	Start	Lillestrøm*	KFUM Oslo, Kongsvinger, Sogndal	
2020	Mjøndalen*	—	Sogndal, Ranheim, Åsane, Raufoss	
2021	Jerv	Brann*	Fredrikstad, KFUM Oslo, Sogndal	
2022	Sandefjord*	—	Start, KFUM Oslo, Sandnes Ulf, Kongsvinger	
2023	Kristiansund	Vålerenga*	Bryne, Start (Walkover), Kongsvinger	
2024	Haugesund*	—	Egersund, Kongsvinger, Lyn, Moss	
2025	Aalesund	Bryne*	Egersund, Kongsvinger, Ranheim	

== By club ==
The following is a list of clubs which have participated, stating the municipality they are from and the number of seasons they have participated in the play-off. It further states the number of times and years the teams have won the play-off, been relegated and not been promoted.

*	Team from the top division

Club	Location	Seasons	No	Years	No	Years	No	Years
Club	Location	Seasons	Wins		Relegations		Not promoted	
Sogndal	Sogndal	10	2	1996, 2000	1	2017*	7	1985, 1995, 2008, 2009, 2018, 2019, 2021
HamKam	Hamar	8	2	1978, 1992*	1	1987*	5	1984, 1988, 1989, 2001, 2013
Bryne	Time	9	1	2001*	2	1988*, 2025*	6	1973, 1990, 1991, 1993, 2006, 2023
Bodø/Glimt	Bodø	6	3	1976, 2004*, 2007	0	—	3	1974, 1975, 2012
Odd	Skien	6	1	2006*	1	2007*	4	1975, 1976, 1977, 1996
Mjøndalen	Nedre Eiker	7	2	2014, 2020*	0	—	5	1980, 2012, 2013, 2016, 2017
Fredrikstad	Fredrikstad	6	2	1974, 2010	2	1981*, 2009*	2	1977, 2021
Brann	Bergen	6	2	1991*, 2002*	4	1981*, 1983*, 2014* 2021*	0	—
Kongsvinger	Kongsvinger	9	2	1998*, 2009	0	—	7	2004, 2016, 2019, 2022, 2023, 2024, 2025
Start	Kristiansand	6	4	1988, 1999, 2015*, 2019	0	—	2	1977, 2021
Molde	Molde	4	3	1979, 1981, 2005*	1	1993*	0	—
Vålerenga	Oslo	5	3	1973, 1989*, 2003*	2	2000*, 2023*	0	—
Tromsø	Tromsø	4	3	1985, 1986*, 1997*	0	—	1	1978
Ranheim	Trondheim	6	1	2017	0	—	5	2010, 2013, 2015, 2020, 2025
Pors	Porsgrunn	4	0	—	0	—	4	1972, 1979, 1981, 1983
Strømsgodset	Drammen	3	2	1993, 1995	1	1999*	0	—
Moss	Moss	4	1	1984*	1	1985*	2	2005, 2024
Eik-Tønsberg	Tønsberg	3	1	1982	0	—	2	1990, 1997
Sandnes Ulf	Sandnes	3	1	2012*	0	—	3	2016, 2017, 2022
Sandefjord	Sandefjord	4	1	2022*	0	—	3	2002, 2003, 2012
Ullensaker/Kisa	Ullensaker	3	0	—	0	—	3	2012, 2017, 2018
Stabæk	Bærum	2	2	2016*, 2018*	0	—	0	—
Lillestrøm	Lillestrøm	2	1	1990*	1	2019*	0	—
Steinkjer	Steinkjer	2	1	1977	0	—	1	1982
Djerv 1919	Haugesund	2	1	1987	0	—	1	1989
Strindheim	Trondheim	2	1	1983	0	—	1	1991
Sarpsborg 08	Sarpsborg	2	1	2013*	0	—	1	2009
Aalesund	Ålesund	2	1	2008*	0	—	1	2018
Mo	Rana	2	0	—	0	—	2	1972, 1977
Vidar	Stavanger	2	0	—	0	—	2	1984, 1986
Lyn	Oslo	3	0	—	0	—	3	1976, 1987, 2024
Drøbak/Frogn	Frogn	2	0	—	0	—	2	1986, 1992
Hødd	Ulstein	2	0	—	0	—	2	2013, 2015
Jerv	Grimstad	3	1	2021	0	—	2	2015, 2016
Raufoss	Vestre Toten	2	1	1972	0	—	1	2021
Vard Haugesund	Haugesund	1	1	1975	0	—	0	—
Haugar	Haugesund	1	1	1980	0	—	0	—
Hønefoss	Ringerike	1	0	—	1	2010*	0	—
Mjølner	Narvik	1	0	—	0	—	1	1973
Eidsvold Turn	Eidsvoll	1	0	—	0	—	1	1974
Strømmen	Lillestrøm	1	0	—	0	—	1	1992
Kjelsås	Oslo	1	0	—	0	—	1	1998
Løv-Ham (defunct)	Bergen	1	0	—	0	—	1	2010
Nest-Sotra	Øygarden	1	0	—	0	—	1	2018
KFUM Oslo	Oslo	2	0	—	0	—	2	2019, 2021
Egersund	Egersund	2	0	—	0	—	2	2024, 2025
Åsane	Bergen	1	0	—	0	—	1	2020
Kristiansund	Kristiansund	3	1	2023	0	—	2	2014, 2015
