= Løvlien =

Løvlien is a surname. Notable people with the surname include:

- Emil Løvlien (1899–1973), Norwegian trade unionist and politician
- Ida Marie Løvlien (born 1974), Norwegian politician
- Ole H. Løvlien (1897–1970), Norwegian politician
- Ronny Løvlien (born 1971), Norwegian footballer
