= 1994 in Norwegian football =

Football in Norway
- Season: 1994

Men's football
- Tippeligaen: Rosenborg
- 1. divisjon: Strindheim (Group A); Hødd (Group B)
- 2. divisjon: Sarpsborg (Group 1); Odd Grenland (Group 2); Sandefjord BK (Group 3); Haugesund (Group 4); Aalesund (Group 5); Stålkameratene (Group 6)
- Cupen: Molde

Women's football
- 1. divisjon: Trondheims-Ørn
- Cupen: Trondheims-Ørn

The 1994 season was the 89th season of competitive football in Norway.

== Men's football ==
=== League season ===
==== Promotion and relegation ====
League	Promoted to league	Relegated from league
Tippeligaen	VIF Fotball; Strømsgodset; Sogndal	Molde; Lyn; Fyllingen
1. divisjon	Alta; Åndalsnes; Jevnaker; Stabæk; Vidar; Stjørdals-Blink	Aalesund; Åssiden; Djerv 1919; Elverum; Ski; Strømmen

==== Tippeligaen ====
Pos	Team	Pld	W	D	L	GF	GA	GD	Pts	Qualification or relegation
1	Rosenborg (C)	22	15	4	3	70	23	+47	49	Qualification for the Champions League qualifying round
2	Lillestrøm	22	12	5	5	42	23	+19	41	Qualification for the UEFA Cup preliminary round
3	Viking	22	11	6	5	41	26	+15	39	Qualification for the UEFA Cup preliminary round
4	Start	22	9	8	5	42	22	+20	35	
5	Kongsvinger	22	11	2	9	38	35	+3	35	
6	Brann	22	9	4	9	38	46	−8	31	
7	Tromsø	22	7	7	8	22	28	−6	28	Qualification for the Intertoto Cup group stage
8	Ham-Kam	22	7	5	10	34	46	−12	26	
9	VIF Fotball	22	5	7	10	32	40	−8	22	
10	Bodø/Glimt	22	5	7	10	30	46	−16	22	
11	Sogndal (R)	22	6	4	12	19	40	−21	22	Relegation to First Division
12	Strømsgodset (R)	22	4	3	15	22	55	−33	15	Relegation to First Division

Source: fotball.no
Rules for classification: 1) points; 2) goal difference; 3) number of goals scored.
(C) Champions; (R) Relegated

Molde FK qualified for the UEFA Cup Winners' Cup as a team from lower division.

==== 1. divisjon ====
===== Group 1 =====
Pos	Team	Pld	W	D	L	GF	GA	GD	Pts	Promotion, qualification or relegation
1	Strindheim (C, P)	22	14	4	4	59	23	+36	46	Promotion to Tippeligaen
2	Stabæk (P)	22	13	3	6	43	32	+11	42	Promotion to Tippeligaen
3	Drøbak/Frogn	22	11	5	6	39	25	+14	38	
4	Nardo	22	11	5	6	32	33	−1	38	
5	Lyn	22	10	4	8	35	24	+11	34	
6	Skeid	22	9	5	8	55	45	+10	32	
7	Moss	22	8	5	9	40	38	+2	29	
8	Alta	22	8	3	11	31	37	−6	27	
9	Tromsdalen	22	8	2	12	41	49	−8	26	
10	Mjølner	22	7	5	10	32	43	−11	26	
11	Stjørdals-Blink (R)	22	6	4	12	31	45	−14	22	Relegation to Second Division
12	Bærum (R)	22	4	1	17	22	61	−39	13	Relegation to Second Division

Source: fotball.no
Rules for classification: 1) points; 2) goal difference; 3) number of goals scored.
(C) Champions; (P) Promoted; (R) Relegated

===== Group 2 =====
Pos	Team	Pld	W	D	L	GF	GA	GD	Pts	Promotion, qualification or relegation
1	Hødd (C, P)	22	14	4	4	52	22	+30	46	Promotion to Tippeligaen
2	Molde (P)	22	13	3	6	44	25	+19	42	Cup Winners' Cup qualifying and promotion to Tippeligaen (Note: Molde qualified for the Cup Winners' Cup as Norwegian Cup winners.)
3	Fyllingen	22	12	5	5	45	25	+20	41	
4	Eik-Tønsberg	22	10	5	7	40	30	+10	35	
5	Bryne	22	8	6	8	36	36	0	30	
6	Fana	22	8	6	8	30	34	−4	30	
7	Jevnaker	22	9	2	11	41	42	−1	29	
8	Åsane	22	8	4	10	34	48	−14	28	
9	Vard Haugesund	22	8	3	11	19	25	−6	27	
10	Åndalsnes	22	7	4	11	26	36	−10	25	
11	Vidar (R)	22	5	5	12	24	46	−22	20	Relegation to Second Division
12	Mjøndalen (R)	22	4	5	13	24	46	−22	17	Relegation to Second Division

Source: fotball.no
Rules for classification: 1) points; 2) goal difference; 3) number of goals scored.
(C) Champions; (P) Promoted; (R) Relegated

==== 2. divisjon ====
===== Group 1 =====
Pos	Team	Pld	W	D	L	GF	GA	GD	Pts	Promotion or relegation
1	Sarpsborg (P)	22	14	5	3	48	20	+28	47	Promotion to First Division
2	Fredrikstad	22	14	4	4	57	23	+34	46	
3	Steinkjer	22	14	4	4	51	28	+23	46	
4	Råde	22	11	1	10	38	32	+6	34	
5	Elverum	22	9	6	7	44	29	+15	33	
6	Nybergsund	22	9	6	7	37	35	+2	33	
7	Faaberg	22	9	4	9	35	36	−1	31	
8	Verdal	22	7	5	10	30	38	−8	26	
9	Sprint-Jeløy	22	7	4	11	43	49	−6	25	
10	Selbak (R)	22	7	3	12	35	54	−19	24	Relegation to Third Division
11	Tynset (R)	22	4	4	14	17	41	−24	16	Relegation to Third Division
12	Namsos (R)	22	4	0	18	2	72	−70	12	Relegation to Third Division

(P) Promoted; (R) Relegated

===== Group 2 =====
Pos	Team	Pld	W	D	L	GF	GA	GD	Pts	Promotion or relegation
1	Odd (P)	22	16	3	3	69	20	+49	51	Promotion to First Division
2	Fossum	22	12	6	4	40	23	+17	42	
3	Ullern	22	12	3	7	51	34	+17	39	
4	Lyn 2 (R)	22	12	2	8	52	43	+9	38	Relegation to Third Division
5	Ski	22	10	3	9	35	30	+5	33	
6	Åssiden	22	9	3	10	37	38	−1	30	
7	Pors	22	8	4	10	27	39	−12	28	
8	Start 2	22	7	6	9	42	36	+6	27	
9	Kjelsås	22	6	8	8	20	34	−14	26	
10	Mercantile (R)	22	6	3	13	27	44	−17	21	Relegation to Third Division
11	Holmen (R)	22	5	6	11	28	46	−18	21	Relegation to Third Division
12	Mandalskameratene (R)	22	4	3	15	26	67	−41	15	Relegation to Third Division

(P) Promoted; (R) Relegated

===== Group 3 =====
Pos	Team	Pld	W	D	L	GF	GA	GD	Pts	Promotion or relegation
1	Sandefjord (P)	22	15	6	1	51	13	+38	51	Promotion to First Division
2	Falk	22	11	6	5	39	27	+12	39	
3	Fram Larvik	22	11	4	7	40	35	+5	37	
4	Strømmen	22	12	1	9	31	26	+5	37	
5	Sørumsand	22	8	6	8	33	26	+7	30	
6	Lillestrøm 2	22	9	3	10	37	36	+1	30	
7	Runar	22	8	5	9	45	41	+4	29	
8	Lørenskog	22	9	1	12	38	43	−5	28	
9	Ørn-Horten	22	7	6	9	28	28	0	27	
10	Holter	22	8	2	12	27	48	−21	26	
11	Aurskog-Finstadbru (R)	22	6	6	10	24	40	−16	24	Relegation to Third Division
12	Grue (R)	22	3	4	15	22	52	−30	13	Relegation to Third Division

(P) Promoted; (R) Relegated

===== Group 4 =====
Pos	Team	Pld	W	D	L	GF	GA	GD	Pts	Promotion or relegation
1	Haugesund (P)	22	18	3	1	56	15	+41	57	Promotion to First Division
2	Flekkefjord	22	13	5	4	56	36	+20	44	
3	Ålgård	22	11	7	4	39	29	+10	40	
4	Hana	22	11	1	10	37	32	+5	34	
5	Os	22	11	1	10	35	38	−3	34	
6	Bjørnar	22	9	4	9	40	37	+3	31	
7	Klepp	22	8	5	9	37	44	−7	29	
8	Viking 2	22	8	4	10	45	46	−1	28	
9	Vedavåg	22	6	7	9	34	41	−7	25	
10	Kopervik	22	7	3	12	32	41	−9	24	
11	Brann 2 (R)	22	4	2	16	30	49	−19	14	Relegation to Third Division
12	Ulf-Sandnes (R)	22	3	4	15	31	64	−33	13	Relegation to Third Division

(P) Promoted; (R) Relegated

===== Group 5 =====
Pos	Team	Pld	W	D	L	GF	GA	GD	Pts	Promotion or relegation
1	Aalesund (P)	22	17	3	2	94	26	+68	54	Promotion to First Division
2	Byåsen	22	15	3	4	61	25	+36	48	
3	Rosenborg 2	22	13	3	6	54	30	+24	42	
4	Orkdal	22	13	2	7	47	34	+13	41	
5	Kolstad	22	12	3	7	57	38	+19	39	
6	Clausenengen	22	9	4	9	48	43	+5	31	
7	Florø	22	9	3	10	38	52	−14	30	
8	Melhus	22	7	7	8	43	51	−8	28	
9	Ørsta	22	8	3	11	38	49	−11	27	
10	Langevåg (R)	22	5	3	14	31	49	−18	18	Relegation to Third Division
11	Volda (R)	22	3	3	16	21	73	−52	12	Relegation to Third Division
12	Sunndal (R)	22	2	1	19	17	79	−62	7	Relegation to Third Division

(P) Promoted; (R) Relegated

===== Group 6 =====
Pos	Team	Pld	W	D	L	GF	GA	GD	Pts	Promotion or relegation
1	Stålkameratene (P)	22	17	3	2	63	28	+35	54	Promotion to First Division
2	Grovfjord	22	14	1	7	61	33	+28	43	
3	Gevir Bodø	22	13	3	6	58	38	+20	42	
4	Skarp	22	11	4	7	68	48	+20	37	
5	Harstad	22	9	9	4	56	26	+30	36	
6	Mo/Bossmo	22	10	4	8	55	41	+14	34	
7	Sortland	22	9	5	8	41	44	−3	32	
8	Lyngen/Karnes	22	9	2	11	42	38	+4	29	
9	Silsand/Omegn	22	8	1	13	43	72	−29	25	
10	Narvik/Nor (R)	22	6	3	13	31	48	−17	21	Relegation to Third Division
11	Norild (R)	22	5	2	15	26	67	−41	17	Relegation to Third Division
12	Tromsø 2 (R)	22	2	1	19	25	86	−61	7	Relegation to Third Division

(P) Promoted; (R) Relegated

=== Norwegian Cup ===
==== Final ====
23 October 1994
13:15 CET (UTC+1)

Molde	3–2	Lyn
Jacobsen 12'; Sundgot 42'; Stavrum 48'	Report	Tessem 9'; Sørensen 59'

Ullevaal Stadion, Oslo
Attendance: 24,524
Referee: Terje Singsaas (Rosenborg)

== Women's football ==
=== League season ===
==== 1. divisjon ====
Pos	Team	Pld	W	D	L	GF	GA	GD	Pts	Relegation
1	Trondheims-Ørn (C)	18	16	1	1	83	21	+62	49	
2	Asker	18	15	0	3	52	18	+34	45	
3	Sprint/Jeløy	18	11	4	3	51	29	+22	37	
4	Donn	18	10	3	5	37	24	+13	33	
5	Sandviken	18	7	4	7	38	27	+11	25	
6	Setskog/Høland	18	7	4	7	33	40	−7	25	
7	Klepp	18	5	1	12	22	45	−23	16	
8	Haugar	18	3	4	11	24	48	−24	13	
9	Fløya (R)	18	4	0	14	14	51	−37	12	Relegation to Second Division
10	Molde (R)	18	1	1	16	19	67	−48	4	Relegation to Second Division

(C) Champions; (R) Relegated

=== Norwegian Women's Cup ===
==== Final ====
- Trondheims-Ørn 5–1 Donn

== UEFA competitions ==
=== UEFA Cup Winners' Cup ===
==== Qualifying round ====
Team 1	Agg.	Team 2	1st leg	2nd leg
Bodø/Glimt (Norway)	6–0	(Latvia) Olimpija Rīga	6–0	0–0

==== First round ====
Team 1	Agg.	Team 2	1st leg	2nd leg
Bodø/Glimt (Norway)	3–4	(Italy) Sampdoria	3–2	0–2

=== UEFA Cup ===
==== Preliminary round ====
Team 1	Agg.	Team 2	1st leg	2nd leg
CS Grevenmacher (Luxembourg)	1–8	(Norway) Rosenborg	1–2	0–6
Lillestrøm (Norway)	4–3	(Ukraine) Shakhtar Donetsk	4–1	0–2

==== First round ====
Team 1	Agg.	Team 2	1st leg	2nd leg
Bordeaux (France)	5–1	(Norway) Lillestrøm	3–1	2–0
Rosenborg (Norway)	2–4	(Spain) Deportivo La Coruña	1–0	1–4(aet)

== National teams ==
=== Norway men's national football team ===
==== Friendlies ====
15 January 1994 Friendly	United States	2–1	Norway	Tempe, United States
CET (UTC+1)	Balboa 55'; Jones 90'	Report	Strandli 45'	Stadium: Sun Devil Stadium; Attendance: 15,386; Referee: Miguel Angel Salas (Mexico)

19 January 1994 Friendly	Costa Rica	0–0	Norway	San Diego, California, United States
CET (UTC+1)		Report		Stadium: Jack Murphy Stadium; Attendance: 56,222; Referee: Arturo Angeles (United States)

9 March 1994 Friendly	Wales	1–3	Norway	Cardiff, Wales
CET (UTC+1)	Coleman 90'	Report	Jostein Flo 6'; Erik Mykland 50'; Mini Jakobsen 51'	Stadium: Ninian Park; Attendance: 10,000; Referee: John Ferry (Northern Ireland)

==== 1994 FIFA World Cup ====
===== Group E =====
Pos	Team	Pld	W	D	L	GF	GA	GD	Pts	Qualification
1	Mexico	3	1	1	1	3	3	0	4	Advance to knockout stage
2	Republic of Ireland	3	1	1	1	2	2	0	4	Advance to knockout stage
3	Italy	3	1	1	1	2	2	0	4	Advance to knockout stage
4	Norway	3	1	1	1	1	1	0	4	

Source: FIFA

Matches

19 June 1994	Norway	1–0	Mexico	RFK Stadium, Washington
16:00 EDT	Rekdal 84'	Report		Attendance: 52,395; Referee: Sándor Puhl (Hungary)

23 June 1994	Italy	1–0	Norway	Giants Stadium, East Rutherford
16:00 EDT	D. Baggio 69'	Report		Attendance: 74,624; Referee: Hellmut Krug (Germany)

28 June 1994	Republic of Ireland	0–0	Norway	Giants Stadium, East Rutherford
12:30 EDT		Report		Attendance: 72,404; Referee: José Torres Cadena (Colombia)
