= 1995 Norwegian First Division =

1. divisjon
- Season: 1995
- Promoted: Moss; Skeid; Strømsgodset
- Relegated: Åndalsnes; Sarpsborg; Vard Haugesund; Alta; Sandefjord; Mjølner
- Matches: 264
- Goals: 853 (3.23 per match)

The 1995 1. divisjon, Norway's second-tier football league, began play on 29 April 1995 and ended on 1 October 1995. The league was contested by 24 teams, divided in two groups and the winner of each group won promotion to Tippeligaen, while the runners-up played a promotion-playoff to win promotion. The bottom three teams were relegated to the 2. divisjon.

Moss and Skeid won promotion to Tippeligaen as group-winners, while Strømsgodset was promoted after beating Sogndal in the promotion play-off. Åndalsnes, Sarpsborg, Vard Haugesund, Alta, Sandefjord and Mjølner was relegated to the 2. divisjon.

== League tables ==
=== Group 1 ===
Pos	Team	Pld	W	D	L	GF	GA	GD	Pts	Promotion, qualification or relegation
1	Moss (C, P)	22	13	7	2	40	22	+18	46	Promotion to Tippeligaen
2	Sogndal	22	13	5	4	42	21	+21	44	Qualification for the promotion play-offs
3	Drøbak/Frogn	22	13	4	5	60	35	+25	43	
4	Haugesund	22	12	2	8	41	33	+8	38	
5	Åsane	22	10	4	8	38	31	+7	34	
6	Aalesund	22	8	8	6	43	33	+10	32	
7	Bryne	22	7	9	6	28	31	−3	30	
8	Fana	22	8	4	10	31	42	−11	28	
9	Fyllingen	22	4	8	10	33	45	−12	20	
10	Åndalsnes (R)	22	4	6	12	22	38	−16	18	Relegation to Second Division
11	Sarpsborg (R)	22	3	8	11	17	38	−21	17	Relegation to Second Division
12	Vard Haugesund (R)	22	4	1	17	17	43	−26	13	Relegation to Second Division

Source: nifs.no
Rules for classification: 1) points; 2) goal difference; 3) number of goals scored.
(C) Champions; (P) Promoted; (R) Relegated

=== Group 2 ===
Pos	Team	Pld	W	D	L	GF	GA	GD	Pts	Promotion, qualification or relegation
1	Skeid (C, P)	22	19	1	2	59	21	+38	58	Promotion to Tippeligaen
2	Strømsgodset (O, P)	22	16	3	3	51	15	+36	51	Qualification for the promotion play-offs
3	Eik-Tønsberg	22	14	4	4	57	24	+33	46	
4	Odd Grenland	22	12	2	8	54	25	+29	38	
5	Tromsdalen	22	10	5	7	37	25	+12	35	
6	Lyn	22	11	1	10	31	29	+2	34	
7	Nardo	22	7	1	14	31	45	−14	22	
8	Stålkameratene	22	6	4	12	24	53	−29	22	
9	Jevnaker	22	6	3	13	30	44	−14	21	
10	Alta (R)	22	6	3	13	30	53	−23	21	Relegation to Second Division
11	Sandefjord BK (R)	22	4	7	11	17	38	−21	19	Relegation to Second Division
12	Mjølner (R)	22	3	2	17	20	69	−49	11	Relegation to Second Division

Source: nifs.no
Rules for classification: 1) points; 2) goal difference; 3) number of goals scored.
(C) Champions; (O) Play-off winners; (P) Promoted; (R) Relegated

== Top goalscorers ==
=== Group 1 ===
15 goals

- Anders Michelsen, Drøbak/Frogn

12 goals

- Johnny Vattøy, Aalesund

11 goals

- Thomas Dahl, Drøbak/Frogn
- Kristian Klausen, Aalesund

10 goals

- Thomas Michelsen, Drøbak/Frogn

=== Group 2 ===
17 goals

- Ole Halvor Kolstad, Odd

16 goals

- Kjell Sture Jensen, Eik

15 goals

- Odd Inge Olsen, Nardo

14 goals

- Dagfinn Enerly, Skeid

13 goals

- Ole Martin Johansen, Skeid

11 goals

- Vegard Berg Johansen, Tromsdalen
- Axel Kolle, Lyn
- Juro Kuvicek, Strømsgodset
- Bent T. Larsen, Odd

10 goals

- Terje Ellingsen, Mjølner
- Krister Isaksen, Strømsgodset
- Atle H. Markussen, Eik

== See also ==
- 1995 Tippeligaen
- 1995 2. divisjon
- 1995 3. divisjon
