= 1993 Norwegian First Division =

1. divisjon
- Season: 1993
- Champions: VIF Fotball; Sogndal
- Promoted: VIF Fotball; Strømsgodset; Sogndal
- Relegated: Åssiden; Elverum; Strømmen; Djerv 1919; Ski; Aalesund
- Matches played: 264
- Goals scored: 881 (3.34 per match)

The 1993 1. divisjon, Norway's second-tier football league, began play on 2 May 1993 and ended on 3 October 1993. The league was contested by 24 teams, divided in two groups and the winner of each group won promotion to Tippeligaen, while the runners-up played a promotion-playoff against the 10th placed team in the 1993 Tippeligaen. The bottom three teams were relegated to the 2. divisjon.

Vålerenga and Sogndal won promotion to Tippeligaen as group winners, while Strømsgodset was promoted after the promotion-playoff, where they beat Molde and Bryne. Åssiden, Elverum, Strømmen, Djerv 1919, Ski and Aalesund was relegated to the 2. divisjon.

== League tables ==
=== Group A ===
Pos	Team	Pld	W	D	L	GF	GA	GD	Pts	Promotion, qualification or relegation
1	VIF Fotball (C, P)	22	13	4	5	52	29	+23	43	Promotion to Tippeligaen
2	Strømsgodset (O, P)	22	12	3	7	43	37	+6	39	Qualification for the promotion play-offs
3	Eik-Tønsberg	22	10	6	6	42	27	+15	36	
4	Nardo	22	10	5	7	39	28	+11	35	
5	Tromsdalen	22	8	10	4	34	30	+4	34	
6	Strindheim	22	9	5	8	27	25	+2	32	
7	Mjøndalen	22	9	3	10	33	40	−7	30	
8	Skeid	22	7	8	7	32	34	−2	29	
9	Mjølner	22	8	5	9	35	38	−3	29	
10	Åssiden (R)	22	7	5	10	30	47	−17	26	Relegation to Second Division
11	Elverum (R)	22	7	1	14	28	37	−9	22	Relegation to Second Division
12	Strømmen (R)	22	3	3	16	31	54	−23	12	Relegation to Second Division

Source: nifs.no
Rules for classification: 1) points; 2) goal difference; 3) number of goals scored.
(C) Champions; (O) Play-off winners; (P) Promoted; (R) Relegated

=== Group B ===
Pos	Team	Pld	W	D	L	GF	GA	GD	Pts	Promotion, qualification or relegation
1	Sogndal (C, P)	22	14	5	3	51	24	+27	47	Promotion to Tippeligaen
2	Bryne	22	12	7	3	52	25	+27	43	Qualification for the promotion play-offs
3	Moss	22	13	2	7	53	33	+20	41	
4	Drøbak/Frogn	22	13	2	7	46	29	+17	41	
5	Bærum	22	10	4	8	40	41	−1	34	
6	Fana	22	7	7	8	34	36	−2	28	
7	Hødd	22	8	4	10	38	52	−14	28	
8	Åsane	22	7	4	11	36	49	−13	25	
9	Vard	22	5	7	10	29	34	−5	22	
10	Djerv 1919 (R)	22	5	7	10	30	39	−9	22	Relegation to Second Division
11	Ski (R)	22	6	3	13	18	35	−17	21	Relegation to Second Division
12	Aalesund (R)	22	4	4	14	28	58	−30	16	Relegation to Second Division

Source: nifs.no
Rules for classification: 1) points; 2) goal difference; 3) number of goals scored.
(C) Champions; (P) Promoted; (R) Relegated

== See also ==
- 1993 Tippeligaen
- 1993 2. divisjon
