= Kjetil Nilsen =

Norwegian footballer (born 1975)

Personal information
- Date of birth: 19 February 1975 (age 51)
- Height: 1.74 m (5 ft 9 in)
- Position: Midfielder

Senior career*
Years	Team	Apps	(Gls)
- Langhus
- Ski
- Drøbak/Frogn
1998–2000	Lillestrøm		
2001–2002	Skjetten		
2003–2008	Follo		
2009–present	Modum		

Managerial career
- 2009–present: Modum (playing assistant coach)
- * Club domestic league appearances and goals

Kjetil Nilsen (born 19 February 1975) is a Norwegian football midfielder.

He started his career in Langhus IL; and later played for Ski IL, Drøbak/Frogn IF and Lillestrøm SK. With Lillestrøm he played in the Norwegian Premier League in 1998, 1999 and 2000. He then played for Skjetten SK and Follo FK.

In February 2009 Nilsen signed as playing assistant coach of Modum FK.
