= Glenn Arne Hansen =

Norwegian footballer (born 1972)

Personal information
- Date of birth: 20 September 1972 (age 54)
- Position: Goalkeeper

Youth career
- Langhus

Senior career*
Years	Team	Apps	(Gls)
1989	Langhus		
1990–1991	Drøbak-Frogn		
1992	Ski		
1993–1996	Drøbak-Frogn		
1996	→ Bradford City (loan)	0	(0)
1996	→ Strømsgodset (loan)		
1997–2001	Strømsgodset		
2002–2010	Follo		
2011–2012	Nesodden		
2013	Drøbak-Frogn		
2014	Nesodden		
2015	Langhus		
2019–	Ski		
- * Club domestic league appearances and goals

Glenn Arne Hansen (born 20 September 1972) is a retired Norwegian football goalkeeper.

After half a year on Langhus's senior team in 1989, he joined the region's prime team Drøbak-Frogn in 1990. He played the 1992 season in Ski, then returned to Drøbak-Frogn.

In March 1996 Hansen was loaned out to Bradford City, trying his luck in reserve matches. However, in late May 1996 the Norwegian top-flight team Strømsgodset was bereft of goalkeepers, and Hansen agreed on a loan to them. He then joined Strømsgodset on a permanent basis, playing there until 2001. He then had a nine-year stint in Follo, staying with them until the 2010 Norwegian Football Cup Final which Follo lost to Hansens former team Strømsgodset. Hansen then played two seasons for then-second-tier Nesodden, then one season each in Drøbak-Frogn, Nesodden and Langhus before retiring as a 43-year old. He joined Ski's coaching setup and even featured for the club's fifth-tier senior team.
