= Etzaz Hussain =

Pakistani footballer (born 1993)

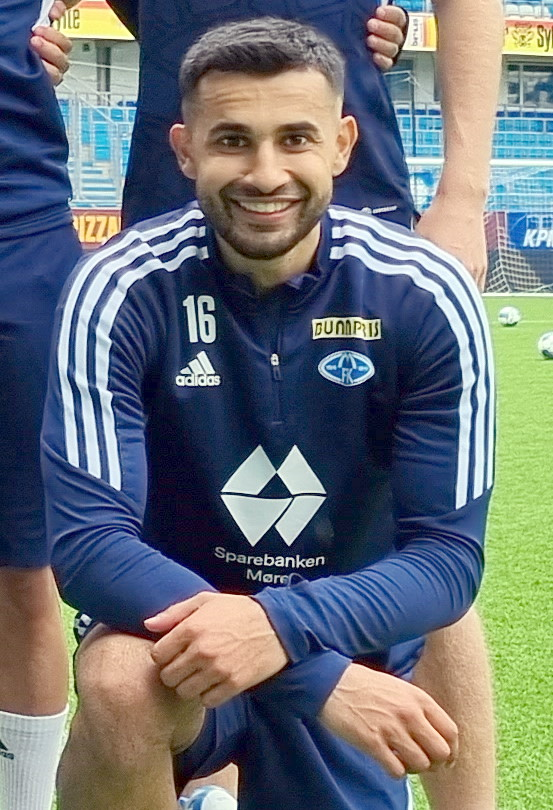
- Hussain with Molde in 2022

Personal information
- Full name: Etzaz Muzafar Hussain
- Date of birth: 27 January 1993 (age 33)
- Place of birth: Oslo, Norway
- Height: 1.76 m (5 ft 9 in)
- Position: Midfielder

Youth career
- ?–2009: Langhus
- 2009–2011: Manchester United
- 2011: Vålerenga

Senior career*
Years	Team	Apps	(Gls)
2011–2012	Fredrikstad	32	(5)
2012–2015	Molde	78	(6)
2016	Sivasspor	8	(0)
2016	Rudeš	3	(0)
2017–2023	Molde	124	(22)
2017	→ Odd (loan)	11	(3)
2023–2024	Apollon Limassol	7	(0)
2024–2026	Odd	42	(1)

International career
2008–2009	Norway U16	9	(2)
2009–2010	Norway U17	10	(0)
2010–2011	Norway U18	10	(2)
2011–2012	Norway U19	11	(0)
2012–2013	Norway U21	8	(3)
2013	Norway U23	1	(0)
2025	Pakistan	3	(1)
Medal record
Molde
Winner	Tippeligaen	2012
Winner	Norwegian Football Cup	2013
Winner	Tippeligaen	2014
Winner	Norwegian Football Cup	2014
Winner	Eliteserien	2019
Winner	Eliteserien	2022
Winner	Norwegian Football Cup	2021–22
- * Club domestic league appearances and goals

Etzaz Muzafar Hussain (Urdu: اعتزاز مظفر حسین; born 27 January 1993) is a former professional footballer who played as a midfielder. Born in Norway, he played for the Pakistan national team. With 295 total appearances, four Eliteserien league and three Norwegian Cup titles with Molde, he is one of the most successful footballers for Molde, where he is the joint most decorated player with seven trophies along with Daniel Berg Hestad. He is also considered one of the most successful Pakistani footballers, being the first Pakistani footballer to play in the Europa League.

Born in Oslo, he played for nearby Langhus as a youth player, before moving to Manchester United in 2009. After two years in England, he returned to Norway with Vålerenga, but shortly after moved to Fredrikstad, where he made his professional debut. Hussain transferred to Molde in mid-2012 and won the Tippeligaen in his first season at the club. After winning four league titles and three Norwegian Cups with Molde across two spells, he moved to Apollon Limassol as a free agent in January 2023, before returning to Odd a year later.

== Club career ==
=== Early years ===
Hussain played for Langhus in his early days, before he transferred to Manchester United on 21 February 2009, and signed a professional contract with United on his 17th birthday. Even though Hussain only stayed in England for two years, and did not get any chances for the first team, he said to the Norwegian newspaper VG in February 2012 that "it was an experience for life" and would advice other Norwegian youngster to grab the opportunity if they had the chance. In January 2011 he returned home to Norway, and signed for the Tippeligaen club Vålerenga.

=== Fredrikstad ===
Less than three months later, Hussain signed for Fredrikstad, also a Tippeligaen club, after some disagreements between Vålerenga and Hussain on the way forward. On 14 August 2011, Hussain sent Fredrikstad to the semi-final of 2011 Norwegian Football Cup with the match-winning goal with only a couple of minutes left of the overtime, at the expense of Molde now managed by his former boss at the Manchester United reserves, Ole Gunnar Solskjær. On 31 October 2011, Hussain scored his second goal in two matches, with the match winning goal against Vålerenga, the club that believed he was not good enough for Tippeligaen.

=== Molde ===
On 27 July 2012, Hussain moved to Molde FK, reuniting with Ole Gunnar Solskjær. He won the league with Molde in 2012 and 2014 and the Norwegian Cup in 2013 and 2014.

=== Sivasspor ===
On 7 January 2016, Hussain signed a 2.5-year contract with Turkish Süper Lig side Sivasspor. With Sivasspor, Hussain was unable to avoid relegation to the second Turkish division. Following relegation, his contract at Sivasspor was terminated in mutual agreement on 4 July 2016.

=== Rudeš Zagreb ===
Hussain signed for the second-tier Croatian side Rudeš, coached by the former Liverpool player Igor Bišćan, in October 2016.

=== Return to Molde ===
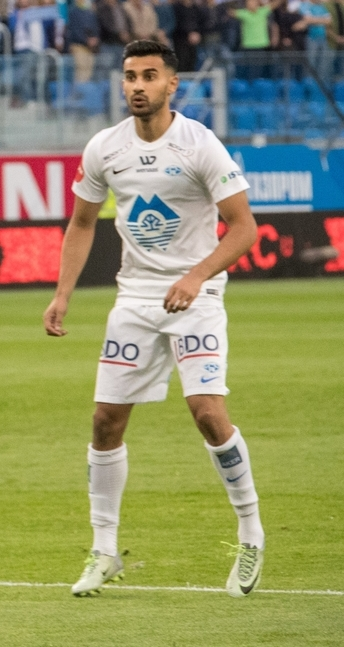
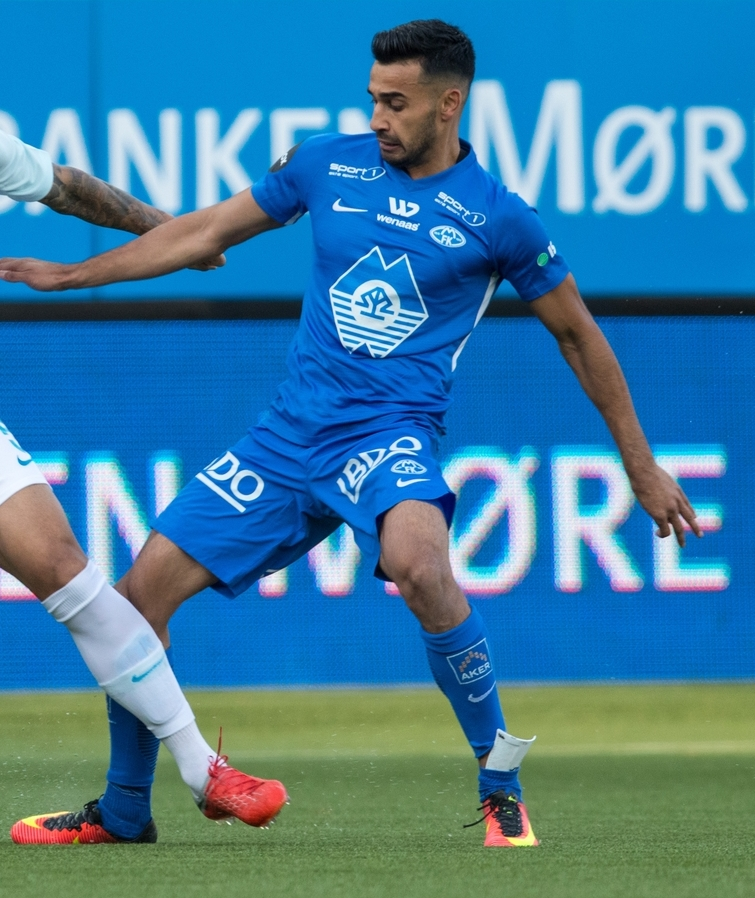
Hussain with Molde at the 2018–19 UEFA Europa League during away and home legs against Zenit

On 28 February 2017, Molde announced that Hussain had returned to the club after the signing of Erling Haaland few days earlier. On 16 August 2017, Hussain was temporarily loaned to fellow Eliteserien club Odd for the rest of the year.

On 11 July 2019, Hussain scored Molde's sixth goal in the club's UEFA competitions record 7–1 win over KR in the UEFA Europa League first qualifying round. On 20 October 2019, he scored a brace in an Eliteserien game Molde won 3–1 over Haugesund. The club ended being champions in the 2019 Eliteserien. On 31 January 2020, Hussain signed a new contract with Molde that will keep him at the club till the end of the 2022 season. He subsequently won the 2021–22 Norwegian Cup. On 16 October 2022, his goal in the 96th minute against Lillestrøm in a 1–0 away win led Molde to win the 2022 Eliteserien title with four games left. After ending champions in the league, Hussain became the joint most decorated player for Molde with seven trophies along with former player Daniel Berg Hestad.

=== Apollon Limassol ===
Following Hussain's release from Molde after winning the 2022 Eliteserien, Cypriot club Apollon Limassol announced on 20 January 2023 that the midfielder had reached an agreement to sign with the defending Cypriot league champions till May 2025. On 24 January 2023, Hussain formally signed with the Limassol club and chose to play with the number 18. He made his league debut for the club on 9 February, coming on as a late substitute in the 4–3 home defeat to Karmiotissa. On 8 January 2024, barely a full year since joining Apollon, the club announced the termination of Hussain's contract by mutual consent.

=== Return to Odd ===
On 25 February 2024, Hussain returned to Odd this time on a contract basis. He was presented as player of the club the next day.

Following the 2025 season, Hussain retired from professional football.

== International career ==
Hussain played on youth level for Norway. In October 2021, he had declared his intention to play for Pakistan. Around two years later on 2 January 2024, Hussain received his Pakistani passport. However in March 2024, after receiving the documentation, Hussain along with Adil Nabi reportedly declined to play under the then management staff of the Pakistan Football Federation for the 2026 FIFA World Cup qualification against Jordan.

On 10 September 2025, Hussain's request to change sports citizenship from Norwegian to Pakistani was approved by FIFA. He made his international debut for the Pakistan national football team on 9 October 2025 in an AFC Asian Cup qualification match against Afghanistan, ending in goalless draw. He scored his first international goal in his second match, during the return match against Afghanistan on 14 October 2025 ending in a 1–1 draw.

== Coaching career ==
In February 2026, following the end of his playing career, Hussain joined the coaching staff of Turkish Süper Lig club Kayserispor as an assistant coach under Erling Moe, his former manager at Molde FK. He left the club in June 2026 following the departure of Moe and his coaching staff.

In August 2026, Hussain returned to his boyhood club Langhus, where he began working with the club's academy, youth teams and first team while undertaking his UEFA coaching qualifications.

== Personal life ==
Born in Oslo, Hussain has discussed his Pakistani heritage in interviews. His both parents originate from the city of Kharian in the Gujrat district of Pakistan. He was also honoured by the Pakistani government at its embassy in Oslo during the country’s Independence Day celebrations on 14 August 2021.

== Career statistics ==
=== Club ===
As of match played 28 June 2025

Appearances and goals by club, season and competition
Club	Season	League			Cup		Europe		Other		Total	
Club	Season	Division	Apps	Goals	Apps	Goals	Apps	Goals	Apps	Goals	Apps	Goals
Fredrikstad	2011	Tippeligaen	20	2	4	1	—		—		24	3
Fredrikstad	2012	Tippeligaen	12	3	2	1	—		—		14	4
Fredrikstad	Total		32	5	6	2	—		—	—	38	7
Molde	2012	Tippeligaen	10	2	2	0	8	0	—		20	2
Molde	2013	Tippeligaen	22	2	6	1	3	0	—		31	3
Molde	2014	Tippeligaen	19	1	6	0	2	0	—		27	1
Molde	2015	Tippeligaen	27	1	3	0	11	2	—		41	3
Molde	Total		78	6	17	1	24	2	—	—	119	9
Sivasspor	2015–16	Süper Lig	8	0	0	0	—		—		8	0
Rudeš	2016–17	FavBet Druga liga	3	0	1	0	—		—		4	0
Molde	2017	Eliteserien	13	1	4	1	—		—		17	2
Molde	2018	Eliteserien	23	5	2	0	7	1	—		32	6
Molde	2019	Eliteserien	15	4	2	0	8	1	0	0	25	5
Molde	2020	Eliteserien	28	8	0	0	11	2	0	0	39	10
Molde	2021	Eliteserien	27	2	1	0	4	1	0	0	32	3
Molde	2022	Eliteserien	18	2	3	0	9	2	0	0	30	4
Molde	Total		135	22	13	1	39	7	0	0	187	30
Odd (loan)	2017	Eliteserien	11	3	0	0	0	0	—		11	3
Apollon Limassol	2022–23	Cypriot First Division	5	0	0	0	—		—		5	0
Apollon Limassol	2023–24	Cypriot First Division	2	0	0	0	—		—		2	0
Apollon Limassol	Total		7	0	0	0	—		—		7	0
Odd	2024	Eliteserien	28	0	3	0	0	0	—		31	0
Odd	2025	OBOS-ligaen	13	0	1	0	0	0	—		14	0
Odd	Total		41	0	4	0	—		—		45	0
Career total			312	37	41	4	63	9	0	0	416	49

=== International ===
As of 18 November 2025

Appearances and goals by national team and year
National team	Year	Apps	Goals
Pakistan	2025	3	1
Total		3	1

Scores and results list Pakistan's goal tally first, score column indicates score after each Hussain goal.

List of international goals scored by Etzaz Hussain
No.	Date	Venue	Opponent	Score	Result	Competition
1	14 October 2025	Ali Sabah Al-Salem Stadium, Farwaniya, Kuwait	Afghanistan	1–1	1–1	2027 AFC Asian Cup qualification

== Honours ==
Molde

- Eliteserien: 2012, 2014, 2019, 2022
- Norwegian Cup: 2013, 2014, 2021–22

Records

- Molde player to have won seven domestic trophies along with Daniel Berg Hestad

== See also ==
- List of Pakistan international footballers born outside Pakistan
