= Roar Stokke =

Norwegian footballer, coach, and commentator

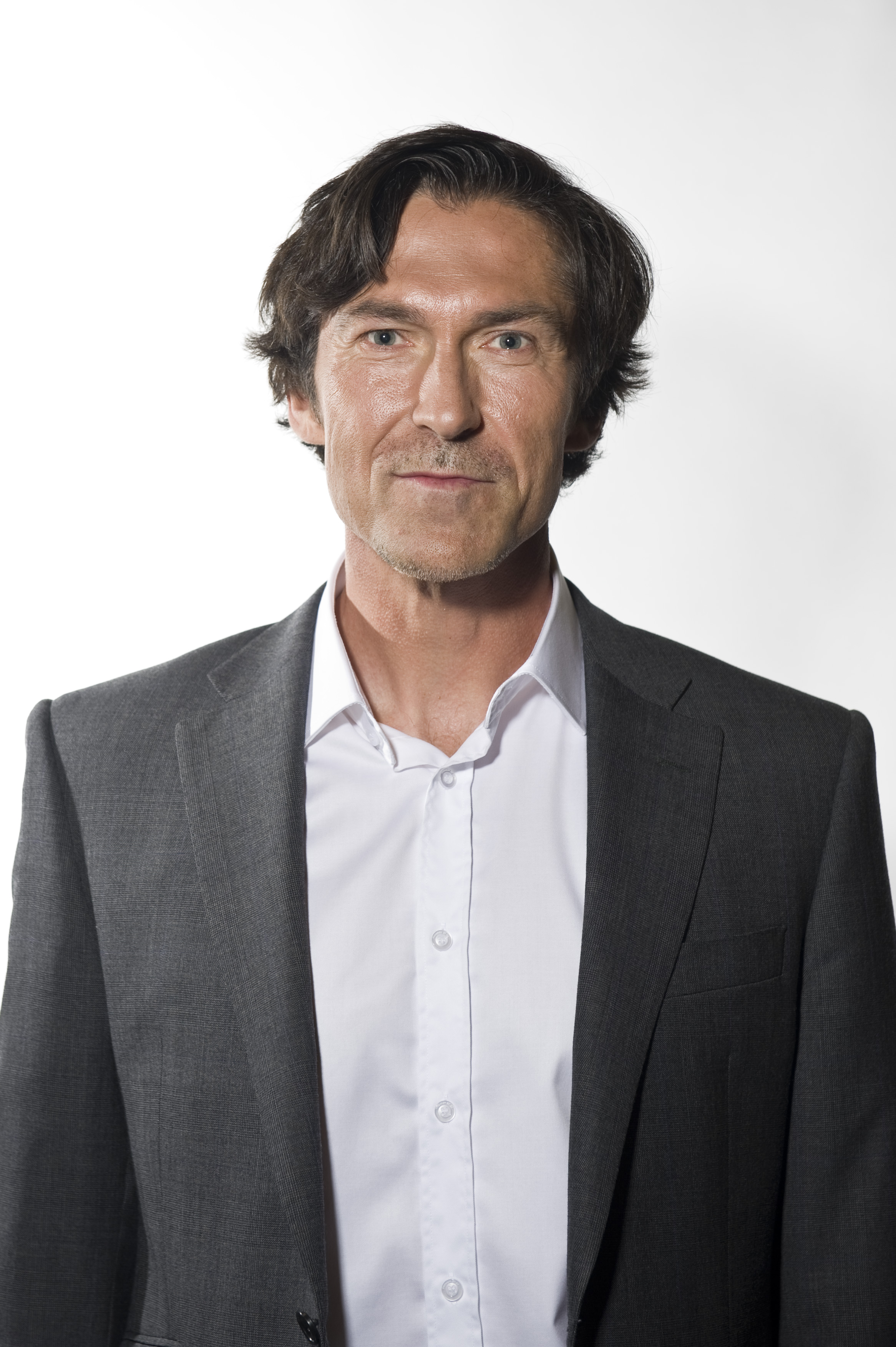

Roar Stokke (born 22 August 1959) is a former football player, coach and commentator, from Norway.

In the mid-1980s he played for Strindheim IL. Ahead of the 1988 season he left for Nardo FK. In 1993, he was playing head coach of Nardo. In 1994 Nardo barely missed promotion to the Norwegian Premier League, marking the heyday of the club's history. Stokke was offered the position as head coach of Tromsdalen UIL, but refused. However, he resigned from Nardo in September 1995 after disagreements with the board of directors.

He was later football commentator in the radio station P4 Radio Hele Norge, and also worked as key account manager in DFDS Tollpost. When Knut Theodor Gleditsch died, he left a vacant seat as the main football commentator of TV 3, which Stokke came to fill. TV3 decided to "brand" the relatively unknown Stokke as a new football profile. Every year Roar comment the matches in the Champions League for the Norwegian channel viasat, and is famous for his extraordinary quotes.
