= 2013 Eliteserien promotion/relegation play-offs =

Norwegian football league play-offs

The 2013 Eliteserien promotion/relegation play-offs was the 40th time a spot in the Norwegian top flight was decided by play-off matches between top tier and second level clubs.

At the end of the 2013 season, Tromsø and Hønefoss were relegated directly to the 2014 1. divisjon, and was replaced by Bodø/Glimt and Stabæk who were directly promoted.

== Background ==
The play-offs between Eliteserien and 1. divisjon have been held every year since 1972 with exceptions in 1994 and 2011. They take place for the two divisions following the conclusion of the regular season and are contested by the fourteenth-placed club in Eliteserien and the four clubs finishing below the automatic promotion places in 1. divisjon. The fixtures are determined by final league position – the first to knockout-rounds begins with the four teams in the 1. divisjon: 3rd v 6th and 4th v 5th, and the winner then play each other to determine who meet the Eliteserien club in the final.

== Qualified teams ==
Five teams entered a play-off for the last Eliteserien spot for the 2014 season. These were:

- Sarpsborg 08 (14th placed team in the Tippeligaen)
- Hødd (third placed team in the 1. divisjon)
- Ranheim (fourth placed team in the 1. divisjon)
- HamKam (fifth placed team in the 1. divisjon)
- Mjøndalen (sixth placed team in the 1. divisjon)

The four 1. divisjon teams first played a single game knockout tournament, with the winner (Ranheim) advancing to a two-legged tie against the Eliteserien team (Sarpsborg 08) for the 16th and final spot in the 2014 Eliteserien season. Sarpsborg 08 maintained their position in the top flight with a 3–0 win on aggregate against Ranheim.

== Matches ==
The third to sixth-placed teams in 2013 1. divisjon took part in the promotion play-offs; these were single leg knockout matches, two semi-finals and a final. The winners of the second round, Ranheim, advanced to play the 14th placed team in Tippeligaen over two legs in the Eliteserien play-offs for a spot in the top flight the following season.

=== First round ===
Final league position – 1. divisjon
Pos	Team	Pld	W	D	L	GF	GA	GD	Pts
3	Hødd	30	15	5	10	41	31	+10	50
4	Ranheim	30	14	7	9	49	38	+11	49
5	HamKam	30	14	6	10	49	43	+6	48
6	Mjøndalen	30	14	5	11	37	40	–3	47

6 November 2013
12:30 CET (UTC+1)

Ranheim	2–0	HamKam
Eek 45'; Løkberg 86'	Report

DNB Arena, Trondheim
Attendance: 1,300
Referee: Espen Andreas Eskås
6 November 2013
13:00 CET (UTC+1)

Hødd	0–2	Mjøndalen
	Report	Diomande 39'; Gauseth 48'

Høddvoll Stadion, Ulsteinvik
Attendance: 2,553
Referee: Kai Erik Steen

=== Second round ===
10 November 2013
15:00 CET (UTC+1)

Mjøndalen	1–4	Ranheim
Eek 71' (o.g.)	Report	Rønning 8'; Eek 31'; Aas 68'; Krogstad 75'

Mjøndalen Stadion, Nedre Eiker
Attendance: 1,349
Referee: Omar Rafiq

=== Final ===
The 14th-placed team, Sarpsborg 08, took part in a two-legged play-off against Ranheim, the winners of the 2013 1. divisjon promotion play-offs, to decide who would play in the 2014 Tippeligaen.

First leg

13 November 2013
19:00 CET (UTC+1)

Sarpsborg 08	1–0	Ranheim
Samuel 45'	Report

Sarpsborg Stadion, Sarpsborg
Attendance: 3,355
Referee: Tom Harald Hagen

Second leg

16 November 2013
12:00 CET (UTC+1)

Ranheim	0–2	Sarpsborg 08
	Report	Elyounoussi 35', 59'

DNB Arena, Trondheim
Attendance: 1,085
Referee: Kristoffer Helgerud

Sarpsborg 08 won 3–0 on aggregate and maintained their position in the 2014 Tippeligaen; Ranheim stayed in the 1. divisjon.

== Bracket ==
First round
3	Hødd	0
6	Mjøndalen	2
4	Ranheim	2
5	HamKam	0

Second round
6	Mjøndalen	1
4	Ranheim	4

Final round
14	Sarpsborg 08	1
4	Ranheim	0
