= Anders Michelsen =

Norwegian footballer (born 1970)

Personal information
- Date of birth: 27 September 1970 (age 56)
- Height: 1.83 m (6 ft 0 in)
- Position: Midfielder

Senior career*
Years	Team	Apps	(Gls)
–1989	Langhus		
1990–1992	Drøbak/Frogn		
1993	Lyn	17	(4)
1994–1995	Drøbak/Frogn		
1996–1997	Skeid	39	(10)
1998–2003	Strømsgodset	120	(26)
2004	Follo	18	(3)
2005	Langhus		
- * Club domestic league appearances and goals

Anders Michelsen (born 27 September 1970) is a retired Norwegian football midfielder.

He started his career in Langhus IL, and joined Drøbak/Frogn ahead of the 1990 season. He played for SFK Lyn in 1993, and then rejoined Drøbak/Frogn. In 1996, he played for Skeid in the Norwegian Premier League. Ahead of the 2008 season he joined Strømsgodset IF. This was the first time that he played for another club than his twin brother Thomas. After some years for Strømsgodset he joined Follo. Having helped win promotion to the First Division, he planned to retire after the 2004 season, but played one final season for Langhus.
