= Ronny Løvlien =

Norwegian footballer (born 1971)

Personal information
- Date of birth: 30 August 1971 (age 55)
- Height: 1.83 m (6 ft 0 in)
- Position: Defender

Team information
- Current team: Langhus IL

Senior career*
Years	Team	Apps	(Gls)
- Langhus IL
- Ski
- Drøbak/Frogn
–2001	Skeid		
2002–2004	Follo		
2005–present	Langhus IL		
- * Club domestic league appearances and goals

Ronny Løvlien (born 30 August 1971) is a Norwegian football defender.

He started his career in Langhus IL, and later played with Skeid in the Norwegian Premier League and Follo. Having helped win promotion to the First Division, he left Follo in favor of a return to Langhus. He helped this club in winning promotion to the Third Division.

His younger brother Kenneth played first-tier football too.
