= Thomas Michelsen =

Norwegian footballer (born 1970)

Personal information
- Date of birth: 27 September 1970 (age 56)
- Height: 1.83 m (6 ft 0 in)
- Position: Midfielder

Senior career*
Years	Team	Apps	(Gls)
–1989	Langhus		
1990–1992	Drøbak/Frogn		
1993	Lyn	10	(0)
1994–1995	Drøbak/Frogn		
1996–1997	Skeid		
1998–1999	Moss		
–2005	Langhus IL		
- * Club domestic league appearances and goals

Thomas Michelsen (born 27 September 1970) is a retired Norwegian football midfielder.

He started his career in Langhus IL, and joined Drøbak/Frogn ahead of the 1990 season. He played for SFK Lyn in 1993, and then rejoined Drøbak/Frogn. In 1996, he played for Skeid in the Norwegian Premier League. Ahead of the 1998 season he joined Moss FK. This was the first time that he played for another club than his twin brother Anders.

He retired after the 2005 season, having finished his career where it started, at Langhus.
