= Langhus IL =

Norwegian sports club

- Full name: Langhus Idrettslag
- Founded: 5 December 1953; 71 years ago
- Ground: Langhus stadion, Langhus
- Manager: Bjørnar Hansen
- League: Third Division
Home colours

Langhus Idrettslag is a Norwegian sports club from Langhus, founded in 1953. It has sections for association football, basketball, table tennis, golf, team handball and gymnastics.

== Overview ==
The men's football team currently plays in the Third Division, the fourth tier of Norwegian football. Langhus stadion is their home field. Their team colors are maroon and white. The club also cooperates with Follo FK.

Some former players have reached top levels in the sport: Anders Michelsen, Thomas Michelsen, Glenn Arne Hansen, Kjetil Nilsen, Ronny Løvlien, Kenneth Løvlien, Etzaz Hussain and Antonio Nusa
