= Aaron Samuel Olanare =

Nigerian footballer (born 1994)

Aaron Samuel
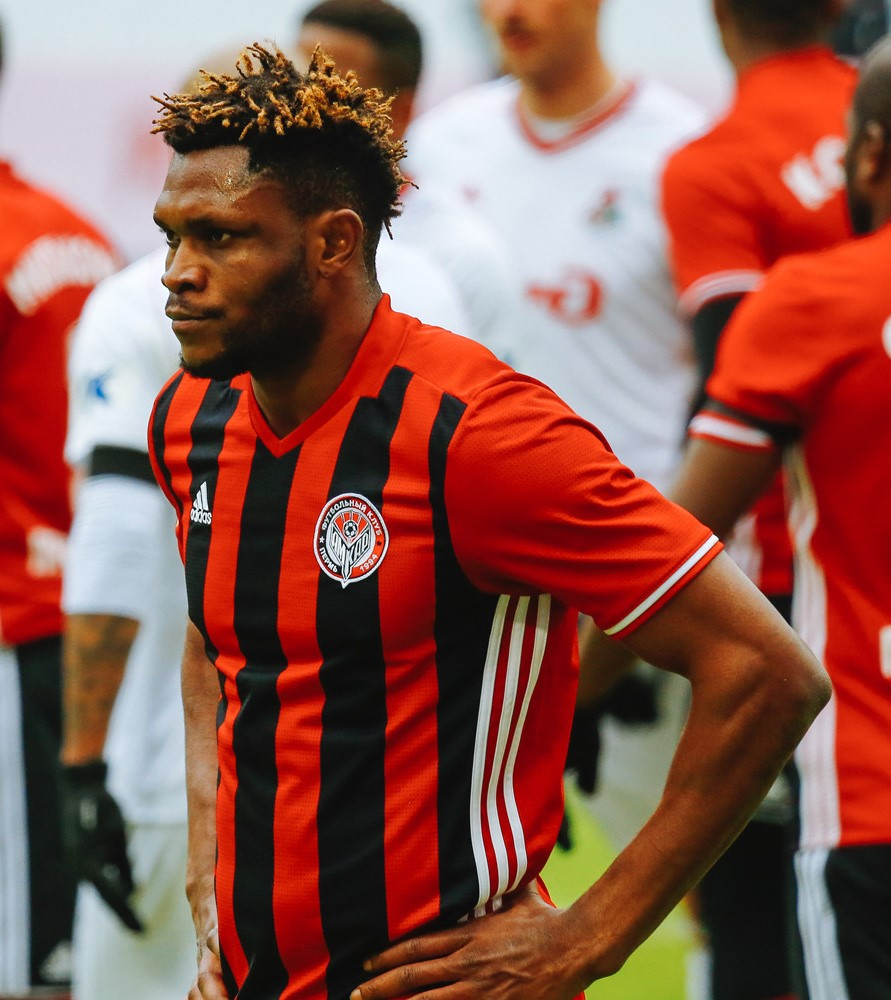
- Olanare with Amkar Perm in 2018

Personal information
- Full name: Aaron Samuel Olanare
- Date of birth: 4 June 1994 (age 32)
- Place of birth: Port Harcourt, Nigeria
- Height: 1.89 m (6 ft 2 in)
- Position: Striker

Senior career*
Years	Team	Apps	(Gls)
2010–2011	Shooting Stars	23	(15)
2011–2012	Dolphins	0	(0)
2012–2013	Vålerenga	15	(1)
2013–2014	Sarpsborg 08	26	(10)
2014–2017	Guangzhou R&F	34	(15)
2016	→ CSKA Moscow (loan)	7	(2)
2017–2018	CSKA Moscow	14	(1)
2017–2018	→ Amkar Perm (loan)	8	(2)
2018–2019	Beitar Jerusalem	4	(1)
2019	Sichuan Longfor	27	(19)
2020	Changchun Yatai	10	(4)
2021–2023	Erzurumspor	55	(13)
2023–2024	Neftchi Baku	12	(2)
2024	Molde	13	(1)

International career^{‡}
2012	Nigeria U-20	8	(4)
2014–2017	Nigeria	7	(2)
- * Club domestic league appearances and goals as of 1 October 2024 ‡ National team caps and goals as of 14 June 2019 (UTC)

Aaron Samuel Olanare (born 4 June 1994) is a Nigerian professional footballer who plays as a striker, most recently for Eliteserien club Molde.

== Club career ==
Olanare started his senior career in the Nigerian team Shooting Stars. In 2012, Olanare signed for Norwegian team Vålerenga. He had been followed closely by the club after being on trial at the club, in the summer of 2012. On 10 July 2013, Olanare signed with another Norwegian team Sarpsborg 08.

On 9 July 2014, Olanare transferred to Chinese Super League side Guangzhou R&F on a two-and-a-half-year contract with the fee of €1.4 million. On 19 July 2014, he made his Super League debut in a 3–2 home win against Jiangsu Sainty and provided an assist in the match. He scored his first goal in China on 31 July 2014, which ensured Guangzhou R&F beat Liaoning Whowin 5–1.

On 17 February 2016, CSKA Moscow announced the signing of Olanare on loan from Guangzhou R&F for the remainder of 2015–16 season. On 2 May 2016, early on in the 2015–16 Russian Cup final game against Zenit St. Petersburg he injured his knee in a collision with Axel Witsel. He stayed on the field and scored an equalizer that made the score 1–1, after which he performed two flips, which exacerbated his knee condition. After another collision with Domenico Criscito, he had to be carried over from the field on a stretcher. CSKA lost the game to Zenit with the score of 1–4. He had to undergo surgery in early June and his recovery was expected to take until the end of 2016 as his CSKA loan contract expired.

On 28 January 2017, Olanare signed a 4 1/2–year contract with CSKA Moscow.

On 22 February 2018, he joined FC Amkar Perm on loan until the end of the 2017–18 season. In his third league game for Amkar on 31 March 2018, he scored twice to give his team an unexpected victory with a score of 2–1 over the league-leading FC Lokomotiv Moscow.

On 14 August 2018, CSKA Moscow announced that Olanare had left the club after his contract was cancelled by mutual consent.

On 12 October 2018, he signed a one-year contract with Beitar Jerusalem as a free player.

On 1 March 2019, Olanare joined League One newcomers Sichuan Longfor. He went on to have a prolific scoring season for the club, earning 19 goals in 27 league matches, ending the season as the club's top goalscorer.

In February 2020 after Sichuan folded due to financial difficulties, Olanare joined China League One club Changchun Yatai on a three-year contract.

On 9 August 2023, Olanare signed a one-year contract with Azerbaijan Premier League club Neftçi. On 6 January 2024, Neftçi announced that Olanare had been released from his contract.

On 27 March 2024, Eliteserien club Molde announced the signing of Olanare on a contract until the end of the 2024 season.

== International career ==
In October 2014, Olanare received his first call up for Nigeria national football team by Stephen Keshi to play against Sudan in the 2015 Africa Cup of Nations qualification. On 11 October 2014, he made his debut for the Super Eagles in a 1–0 away defeat against Sudan, coming on as a substitute for Nosa Igiebor in the 47th minute. On 15 October 2014, Olanare scored his first goal in a 3–1 home victory against Sudan. He restored Nigerias lead in the 66th minute when he stabbed home a loose ball after a mix-up between Sudan goalkeeper Akram El Hadi and his defender. Olanare scored his second goal for Nigeria in a 2–0 away victory over Congo. He scored the second goal of the match to secure the victory.

== Career statistics ==
=== Club ===
As of match played 28 July 2024.

Appearances and goals by club, season and competition
Club	Season	League			National Cup		Continental		Other		Total	
Club	Season	Division	Apps	Goals	Apps	Goals	Apps	Goals	Apps	Goals	Apps	Goals
Vålerenga	2012	Tippeligaen	5	1	0	0	—		—		5	1
Vålerenga	2013	Tippeligaen	10	0	1	1	—		—		11	1
Vålerenga	Total		15	1	1	1	—		—		16	2
Sarpsborg 08	2013	Tippeligaen	13	5	0	0	—		2 (Note: Appearances in Relegation play-offs)	1	15	6
Sarpsborg 08	2014	Tippeligaen	13	5	3	2	—		—		16	7
Sarpsborg 08	Total		26	10	3	2	—		2	1	31	13
Guangzhou R&F	2014	Chinese Super League	16	8	1	0	—		—		17	8
Guangzhou R&F	2015	Chinese Super League	18	7	0	0	0	0	—		18	7
Guangzhou R&F	2016	Chinese Super League	0	0	0	0	—		—		0	0
Guangzhou R&F	Total		34	15	1	0	0	0	—		35	15
CSKA Moscow (loan)	2015–16	Russian Premier League	7	2	3	1	0	0	—		10	3
CSKA Moscow	2016–17	Russian Premier League	7	0	0	0	0	0	—		7	0
CSKA Moscow	2017–18	Russian Premier League	7	1	1	0	3	0	—		11	1
CSKA Moscow	2018–19	Russian Premier League	0	0	0	0	0	0	0 (Note: Appearances in Russian Super Cup)	0	0	0
CSKA Moscow	Total		21	3	4	1	3	0	0	0	28	4
Amkar Perm (loan)	2017–18	Russian Premier League	8	2	1	0	—		—		9	2
Beitar Jerusalem	2018–19	Israeli Premier League	4	1	0	0	—		—		4	1
Sichuan Longfor	2019	China League One	27	19	0	0	—		—		27	19
Changchun Yatai	2020	China League One	10	4	0	0	—		—		10	4
Erzurumspor	2021–22	TFF First League	32	9	1	0	—		—		33	9
Erzurumspor	2022–23	TFF First League	23	4	0	0	—		—		23	4
Erzurumspor	Total		55	13	1	0	—		—		56	13
Neftçi	2023–24	Azerbaijan Premier League	12	2	1	1	2	0	—		15	3
Molde	2024	Eliteserien	13	1	4	4	1	0	—		18	5
Career total			215	71	16	9	6	0	2	1	239	78

=== International ===
As of match played 13 July 2015

Appearances and goals by national team and year
National team	Year	Apps	Goals
Nigeria	2014	4	2
Nigeria	2015	3	0
Nigeria	2017	0	0
Total		7	2

Scores and results list Nigeria's goal tally first.

No	Date	Venue	Opponent	Score	Result	Competition
1.	15 October 2014	Abuja Stadium, Abuja, Nigeria	Sudan	2–1	3–1	2015 Africa Cup of Nations qualification
2.	15 November 2014	Stade Municipal, Pointe-Noire, Congo	Congo	2–0	2–0	2015 Africa Cup of Nations qualification

== Honours ==
=== Club ===
Changchun Yatai

- China League One: 2020
