= Arild Nordfjærn =

Norwegian footballer (born 1965)

Personal information
- Date of birth: 25 November 1965 (age 60)
- Position: Midfielder

Senior career*
Years	Team	Apps	(Gls)
1987?–1988	Strindheim		
1989–1991	Nardo		
1992	Rosenborg	5	(1)
1993–1994	Nardo		
1995	Strindheim		
- * Club domestic league appearances and goals

Arild Nordfjærn (born 25 November 1965) is a retired Norwegian football midfielder.

Playing for Strindheim IL in the Norwegian second tier (then: 2. Divisjon) in 1987, Nordfjærn left them to join Nardo FK ahead of the 1989 season. He became a star player for the third-tier club, scoring 40 goals in the 1991 season. He thereby took the club record for most goals scored in one season as well as most goals scored in one match (8), and most goals overall (81).

Ahead of the 1992 season he was scouted by Norway's leading club Rosenborg BK. He played seven games and scored two goals, among which two games and one goal came in the 1992 Norwegian Football Cup. His contract was not renewed, and he returned to Nardo. In 1995, he returned to Strindheim, who had won promotion to the Norwegian Premier League. The team ended dead last in the table, and Nordfjærn seemingly retired.
