= Ole H. Løvlien =

Norwegian politician

Ole H. Løvlien (5 July 1897 – 20 August 1970) was a Norwegian politician for the Labour Party.

He served as a deputy representative to the Parliament of Norway from Hedmark during the term 1958–1961. In total he met during 6 days of parliamentary session. On the local level he was a mayor of Løten Municipality.

He was the older brother of Emil Løvlien.
