= Ida Marie Løvlien =

Norwegian politician (born 1974)

Ida Marie Løvlien (born 7 February 1974) is a Norwegian politician for the Centre Party.

She served as a deputy representative to the Norwegian Parliament from Hedmark during the term 1997–2001. In total she met during 49 days of parliamentary session.
