= 2018 Eliteserien promotion/relegation play-offs =

Norwegian football league play-offs

The 2018 Eliteserien promotion/relegation play-offs was the 45th time a spot in the Eliteserien was decided by play-off matches between top tier and second level clubs. In the play-offs, five teams compete for one spot in the 2019 Eliteserien.

At the end of the 2018 season, Start and Sandefjord were relegated directly to 2019 1. divisjon, and were replaced by Viking and Mjøndalen who were directly promoted.

== Background ==
The play-offs between Eliteserien and 1. divisjon have been held every year since 1972 with exceptions in 1994 and 2011. They take place for the two divisions following the conclusion of the regular season and are contested by the fourteenth-placed club in Eliteserien and the four clubs finishing below the automatic promotion places in the 1. divisjon. The fixtures are determined by final league position – the first two knockout-rounds begins with the four teams in the 1. divisjon: 3rd v 6th and 4th v 5th, and the winner then play each other to determine who meet the Eliteserien club in the final.

== Qualified teams ==
Five teams entered a play-off for the last Eliteserien spot for the 2019 season. These were:

- Stabæk (14th placed team in Eliteserien)
- Aalesund (third placed team in the 1. divisjon)
- Sogndal (fourth placed team in the 1. divisjon)
- Ullensaker/Kisa (fifth placed team in the 1. divisjon)
- Nest-Sotra (sixth placed team in the 1. divisjon)

The four 1. divisjon teams first played a single game knockout tournament, with the winner (Aalesund) advancing to a two-legged tie against the Eliteserien team (Stabæk) for the 16th and final spot in the 2019 Eliteserien season.

=== Matches ===
The third to sixth-placed teams took part in the promotion play-offs; these were single leg knockout matches, two semi-finals and a final. The winners, Aalesund, advanced to play the 14th placed team in Eliteserien over two legs in the Eliteserien play-offs for a spot in the top-flight the following season.

==== First round ====
25 November 2018
16:00 CET (UTC+1)

Aalesund	1–0	Nest-Sotra
Guèye 52'	Report

Color Line Stadion, Ålesund
Attendance: 3,102
Referee: Tommy Skjerven
25 November 2018
16:00 CET (UTC+1)

Sogndal	1–0	Ullensaker/Kisa
Haugen 90+2'	Report

Fosshaugane, Sogndalsfjøra
Attendance: 1,902
Referee: Trygve Kjensli

==== Second round ====
29 November 2018
18:00 CET (UTC+1)

Aalesund	3–1	Sogndal
Friðjónsson 48' (pen.); Guèye 55', 90+4'	Report	Fredriksen 51'

Color Line Stadion, Ålesund
Attendance: 3,458
Referee: Kristoffer Hagenes

==== Final ====
The 14th-placed team in Eliteserien, Stabæk, played a two-legged play-off against Aalesund, the winners of the 1. divisjon promotion play-offs, to decide who will play in the 2019 Eliteserien.

5 December 2018
18:00 CET (UTC+1)

Stabæk	1–0	Aalesund
Børkeeiet 27'	Report

Nadderud Stadion, Bærum
Attendance: 3,831
Referee: Svein Oddvar Moen
9 December 2018
18:00 CET (UTC+1)

Aalesund	1–1	Stabæk
O. Lie 30'	Report	Guèye 71' (o.g.)

Color Line Stadion, Ålesund
Attendance: 6,333
Referee: Tore Hansen

Stabæk won 2–1 on aggregate and retained their position in Eliteserien.

== Bracket ==
First round
3	Aalesund	1
6	Nest-Sotra	0
4	Sogndal	1
5	Ullensaker/Kisa	0

Second round
3	Aalesund	3
4	Sogndal	1

Final round
14	Stabæk	1
3	Aalesund	0
