= Emil Løvlien =

Norwegian politician

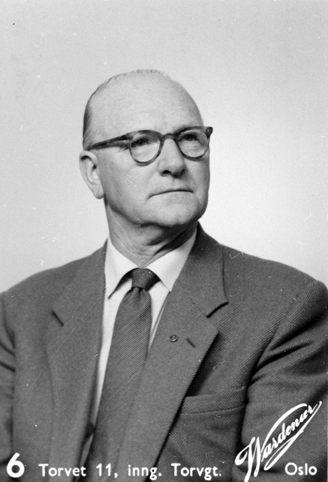

Chairman of the Communist Party of Norway
- In office 1946–1965
- Preceded by: Adam Egede-Nissen
- Succeeded by: Reidar T. Larsen

Member of Parliament for Hedmark
- In office 12 October 1953 – 11 September 1961
- In office 8 October 1945 – 10 October 1949

Personal details
- Born: 22 September 1899 Løiten Municipality, Norway
- Died: 4 June 1973 (aged 73)
- Party: Communist Party of Norway (1923-); Labour Party (1918-1923)
- Parent(s): Herman Løvlien; Oline Løvlien
- Relatives: Ole H. Løvlien (brother)
- Education: International Lenin School
- Occupation: Forest worker, trade unionist and politician

Emil Løvlien (22 September 1899 – 4 June 1973) was a Norwegian forest worker, trade unionist and politician from Løiten Municipality. He represented the Labour Party until the split in 1923, and the Communist Party thereafter. He was the chairman of the Communist Party from 1946 to 1965, and served three terms in the Parliament of Norway.

== Pre-war life and career ==
Emil Løvlien was born in Løiten Municipality as the son of smallholder Herman Løvlien (1858–1941) and his wife Oline (1857–1932). He was the younger brother of Ole H. Løvlien. Emil Løvlien attended secondary modern school from 1913, but left in 1914 to become a forest worker. In 1918 Løvlien joined the local branch of the trade union, Norwegian Union of Forestry and Land Workers. He also became involved in politics, and was selected as a member of the board of the local chapter of the Labour Party.

In 1922 Løvlien was selected to the national board of the Union of Forestry and Land Workers. He was elected to the municipal council for Løten Municipality, but left the board of the Labour Party chapter, only to return in 1923 as a board member of the local Communist Party chapter. The Communist Party had split from the Labour Party in 1923, due to the latter's unwillingness to accept the Twenty-one Conditions, leading to exclusion from the Comintern. The next year, in 1924, Løvlien left the national board of the Union of Forestry and Land Workers, but began a two-year stint as board member of the Communist Party in Hedmark.

Løvlien stood for parliamentary election in 1930 and 1933, but unsuccessfully. In 1931, he was again elected to the municipal council. He was re-elected in 1934, and in the same year he became the party secretary of the Communist Party nationwide. Due to this position, he was also a member of the party's central committee, and served as a member of the board of the party newspaper Arbeideren from 1934. From 1936 he was also a member of the party politburo. He left all positions in 1940, the year that Norway was invaded by Nazi Germany, and the Communist Party declared illegal.

== Post-war career ==
In 1945, at the first elections after the liberation of Norway from German occupation, Løvlien was elected to the Norwegian Parliament from Hedmark. He was a member of the Standing Committee of Finance and Customs and the Election Committee, served as Vice President of the Odelsting and as a representative to the Inter-Parliamentary Union. He also took over as party chairman of the Communist Party, in 1946.

Løvlien was not re-elected to Parliament in 1949, but returned in 1953 and 1957 to serve two more terms. During both these terms he continued as a member of the Standing Committee of Finance and Customs and the Election Committee. He stood for re-election in 1961, but lost out to Karen Grønn-Hagen of the Centre Party. The margin was extremely small by Norwegian standards; only 16 votes. As such Løvlien was the last member of parliament to be elected from the Communist Party ticket (Reidar T. Larsen was elected in 1973, but as a part of the Socialist Electoral League).

Løvlien stepped down as chairman of the Communist Party in 1965. He continued as a member of the municipal council of Løten Municipality until his death. His brother Ole Løvlien became mayor.

Party political offices
Preceded by Adam Egede-Nissen	Chairman of the Communist Party of Norway; 1946–1965	Succeeded by Reidar T. Larsen
