= 2012 Eliteserien promotion/relegation play-offs =

Norwegian football league play-offs

The 2012 Eliteserien promotion/relegation play-offs was the 39th time a spot in the Norwegian top flight was decided by play-off matches between top tier and second-level clubs.

At the end of the 2012 season, Fredrikstad and Stabæk were relegated directly to the 2013 1. divisjon, and was replaced by Start and Sarpsborg 08 who were directly promoted.

== Background ==
The play-offs between Eliteserien and 1. divisjon have been held every year since 1972 with exceptions in 1994 and 2011. They take place for the two divisions following the conclusion of the regular season and are contested by the fourteenth-placed club in Eliteserien and the four clubs finishing below the automatic promotion places in 1. divisjon. The fixtures are determined by final league position – the first to knockout-rounds begins with the four teams in the 1. divisjon: 3rd v 6th and 4th v 5th, and the winner then play each other to determine who meet the Eliteserien club in the final.

== Qualified teams ==
Five teams entered a play-off for the last Eliteserien spot for the 2013 season. These were:

- Sandnes Ulf (14th placed team in the Tippeligaen)
- Sandefjord (third placed team in the 1. divisjon)
- Mjøndalen (fourth placed team in the 1. divisjon)
- Bodø/Glimt (fifth placed team in the 1. divisjon)
- Ullensaker/Kisa (sixth placed team in the 1. divisjon)

The four 1. divisjon teams first played a single game knockout tournament, with the winner (Ullensaker/Kisa) advancing to a two-legged tie against the Eliteserien team (Sandnes Ulf) for the 16th and final spot in the 2013 Eliteserien season. Sandnes Ulf maintained their position in the top flight with a 7–1 win on aggregate against Ullensaker/Kisa.

== Matches ==
The third to sixth-placed teams in 2012 1. divisjon took part in the promotion play-offs; these were single leg knockout matches, two semi-finals and a final. The winners of the second round, Ullensaker/Kisa, advanced to play the 14th placed team in Tippeligaen over two legs in the Eliteserien play-offs for a spot in the top flight the following season.

=== First round ===
Final league position – 1. divisjon
| Pos | Team | Pld | W | D | L | GF | GA | GD | Pts |
|---|---|---|---|---|---|---|---|---|---|
| 3 | Sandefjord | 30 | 16 | 7 | 7 | 44 | 29 | +15 | 55 |
| 4 | Mjøndalen | 30 | 16 | 7 | 7 | 52 | 43 | +9 | 55 |
| 5 | Bodø/Glimt | 30 | 13 | 9 | 8 | 59 | 36 | +23 | 48 |
| 6 | Ullensaker/Kisa | 30 | 14 | 2 | 14 | 45 | 39 | +6 | 44 |

14 November 2012
19:00 CET (UTC+1)

| Sandefjord | 3–4 | Ullensaker/Kisa |
|---|---|---|
| Dimitriadis 55' (pen.), 63' (90), pen.' Onstad 17' (pen.) | Report | dos Santos 4'; Onstad 17' (pen.); Rosenkilde 32'; Jensen 50' |

komplett.no Arena, Sandefjord
Attendance: 1,324
Referee: Espen Andreas Eskås
14 November 2012
19:00 CET (UTC+1)

| Mjøndalen | 1–2 | Bodø/Glimt |
|---|---|---|
| Ingebretsen 77' (pen.) | Report | Olsen 16'; Dantas 66' |

Mjøndalen Stadion, Nedre Eiker
Attendance: 1,220
Referee: Omar Rafiq

=== Second round ===
17 November 2012
18:00 CET (UTC+1)

| Ullensaker/Kisa | 2–0 | Bodø/Glimt |
|---|---|---|
| dos Santos 49'; Onstad 87' (pen.) | Report |

Jessheim Stadion, Jessheim
Attendance: 852
Referee: Omar Rafiq

=== Final ===
The 14th-placed team, Sandnes Ulf, took part in a two-legged play-off against Ullensaker/Kisa, the winners of the 2012 1. divisjon promotion play-offs, to decide who would play in the 2013 Tippeligaen.

First leg

21 November 2012
19:00 CET (UTC+1)

| Ullensaker/Kisa | 0–4 | Sandnes Ulf |
|---|---|---|
| | Report | Traustason 24'; Gytkjær 80'; Helle 85'; Holmvik 90' |

Jessheim Stadion, Jessheim
Attendance: 1,310
Referee: Tom Harald Hagen

Second leg

24 November 2012
19:00 CET (UTC+1)

| Sandnes Ulf | 3–1 | Ullensaker/Kisa |
|---|---|---|
| Høiland 20'; Gytkjær 31' (pen.), 68' (pen.) | Report | Rosenkilde 18' |

Sandnes Stadion, Sandnes
Attendance: 2,633
Referee: Per Ivar Staberg

Sandnes Ulf won 7–1 on aggregate and maintained their position in the 2013 Tippeligaen; Ullensaker/Kisa remained in the 1. divisjon.

== Bracket ==
First round
3 | Sandefjord | 3
6 | Ullensaker/Kisa | 4
4 | Mjøndalen | 1
5 | Bodø/Glimt | 2

Second round
6 | Ullensaker/Kisa | 2
5 | Bodø/Glimt | 0

Final round
6 | Ullensaker/Kisa | 0
14 | Sandnes Ulf | 4
