= 2015 Eliteserien promotion/relegation play-offs =

Norwegian football league play-offs

The 2015 Eliteserien promotion/relegation play-offs was the 42nd time a spot in the Norwegian top flight was decided by play-off matches between top tier and second level clubs.

At the end of the 2015 season, Mjøndalen and Sandefjord Fotball were relegated directly to 2016 OBOS-ligaen, and was replaced by Sogndal and SK Brann who were directly promoted.

== Background ==
The play-offs between Eliteserien and 1. divisjon have been held every year since 1972 with exceptions in 1994 and 2011. They take place for the two divisions following the conclusion of the regular season and are contested by the fourteenth-placed club in Eliteserien and the four clubs finishing below the automatic promotion places in 1. divisjon. The fixtures are determined by final league position – the first to knockout-rounds begins with the four teams in the OBOS-ligaen: 3rd v 6th and 4th v 5th, and the winner then play each other to determine who meet the Eliteserien club in the final.

== Qualified teams ==
Five teams entered a play-off for the last Eliteserien spot for the 2016 season. These were:

- Start (14th placed team in the Tippeligaen)
- Kristiansund (third placed team in the OBOS-ligaen)
- Hødd (fourth placed team in the OBOS-ligaen)
- Jerv (fifth placed team in the OBOS-ligaen)
- Ranheim (sixth placed team in the OBOS-ligaen)

The four OBOS-ligaen teams first played a single game knockout tournament, with the winner (Jerv) advancing to a two-legged tie against the Eliteserien team (Start) for the 16th and final spot in the 2016 Eliteserien season. Start maintained their position in the top flight with a 4–2 win on aggregate against Jerv.

=== Matches ===
The third to sixth-placed teams in 2015 1. divisjon took part in the promotion play-offs; these were single leg knockout matches, two semi-finals and a final. The winners of the second round, Jerv, advanced to play the 14th placed team in Tippeligaen over two legs in the Eliteserien play-offs for a spot in the top-flight next season.

==== First round ====
8 November 2015
12:00 CET (UTC+1)

Kristiansund	1–0	Ranheim
Økland 60'	Report

Kristiansund Stadion, Kristiansund
Attendance: 1,905
Referee: Kai Erik Steen
8 November 2015
15:00 CET (UTC+1)

Hødd	1–1 (a.e.t.)	Jerv
Wrele 38'	Report	Omoijuanfo 90'
Penalties
Aursnes (penalty scored); Kallevåg (penalty scored); Andersen (penalty scored); Sveen (penalty scored); Karlsen (penalty missed); Wrele (penalty scored); Aasbak (penalty missed)	5–6	(penalty scored) MacConnacher; (penalty missed) Antwi; (penalty scored) N. Andersen; (penalty scored) Edvardsen; (penalty scored) Omoijuanfo; (penalty scored) G. Andersen; (penalty scored) Collett

Høddvoll Stadion, Grimstad
Attendance: 1,663
Referee: Marius Hansen Grøtta

1–1 on aggregate. Jerv won 6–5 on penalties.

==== Second round ====
15 November 2015
12:00 CET (UTC+1)

Kristiansund	0–2	Jerv
	Report	Lind 85'; Robstad 90'

Kristiansund Stadion, Kristiansund
Attendance: 2,152
Referee: Tommy Skjerven

==== Final ====
The 14th-placed team, Start, took part in a two-legged play-off against Jerv, the winners of the 2015 First Division promotion play-offs, to decide who would play in the 2016 Tippeligaen.

21 November 2015
12:00 CET (UTC+1)

Jerv	1–1	Start
Omoijuanfo 86'	Report	Stokkelien 19'

Levermyr Stadion, Grimstad
Attendance: 2,010
Referee: Trygve Kjensli
25 November 2015
19:00 CET (UTC+1)

Start	3–1	Jerv
Hollingen 42'; Børufsen 49'; DeJohn 83'	Report	Antwi 45'

Sør Arena, Kristiansand
Attendance: 12,245
Referee: Tom Harald Hagen

Start won 4–2 on aggregate and retained their place in the 2016 Tippeligaen; Jerv remained in the First Division.

== Bracket ==
First round
3	Kristiansund	1
6	Ranheim	0
4	Hødd	1(5)
5	Jerv (pen.)	1(6)

Second round
3	Kristiansund	0
5	Jerv	2

Final round
5	Jerv	1
14	Start	1
