= Karl Morten Eek =

Norwegian footballer (born 1988)

Personal information
- Full name: Karl Morten Røvik Eek
- Date of birth: 25 June 1988 (age 38)
- Place of birth: Sparbu, Norway
- Height: 1.88 m (6 ft 2 in)
- Position: Defender

Youth career
- Sparbu
- Steinkjer

Senior career*
Years	Team	Apps	(Gls)
2005–2008	Steinkjer		
2009–2011	Bodø/Glimt	21	(1)
2009	→ Nybergsund (loan)	6	(0)
2010	→ Løv-Ham (loan)	28	(0)
2012	Umeå	25	(2)
2013–2018	Ranheim	110	(6)
2019	Steinkjer	25	(3)
- * Club domestic league appearances and goals as of 26 October 2019

Karl Morten Eek (born 25 June 1988) is a Norwegian former footballer.

== Playing career ==
He was born in Sparbu and started his career in Sparbu IL. He made his senior debut in May 2005, for Steinkjer FK. He attracted the interest of both Molde FK and Rosenborg BK, but joined FK Bodø/Glimt ahead of the 2009 season. In the latter half of 2009 he was loaned out to Nybergsund IL-Trysil.

Ahead of the 2012-season, Eek signed with the Superettan-club Umeå, before he returned to Norway and Ranheim in 2013. Ahead of the 2019 season he was released from Ranheim and went back to Steinkjer in the third division.

== Career statistics ==
=== Club ===
As of match played 26 October 2019

Appearances and goals by club, season and competition
Club	Season	League			National Cup		Continental		Total	
Club	Season	Division	Apps	Goals	Apps	Goals	Apps	Goals	Apps	Goals
Bodø/Glimt	2009	Tippeligaen	2	0	1	1	-		3	1
Bodø/Glimt	2010	1. divisjon	0	0	0	0	-		0	0
Bodø/Glimt	2011	1. divisjon	19	1	2	0	-		21	1
Bodø/Glimt	Total		21	1	3	1	-	-	24	2
Nybergsund (loan)	2009	1. divisjon	6	0	0	0	-		6	0
Nybergsund (loan)	Total		6	0	0	0	-	-	6	0
Løv-Ham (loan)	2010	1. divisjon	28	0	4	1	-		32	1
Løv-Ham (loan)	Total		28	0	4	1	-	-	32	1
Umeå	2012	Superettan	25	2	1	0	-		26	2
Umeå	Total		25	2	1	0	-	-	26	2
Ranheim	2013	1. divisjon	22	0	4	0	-		26	0
Ranheim	2014	1. divisjon	29	5	4	0	-		33	5
Ranheim	2015	1. divisjon	16	1	2	0	-		18	1
Ranheim	2016	1. divisjon	26	0	2	0	-		28	0
Ranheim	2017	1. divisjon	16	0	3	0	-		19	0
Ranheim	2018	Eliteserien	1	0	0	0	-		1	0
Ranheim	Total		110	6	15	0	-	-	125	6
Steinkjer	2019	3. divisjon	25	3	3	0	-		28	3
Steinkjer	Total		25	3	3	0	-	-	28	3
Career total			215	12	26	2	-	-	241	14
