= 1994 Norwegian Second Division =

Association Football league in Norway in 1994

The 1994 2. divisjon, the third highest association football league for men in Norway.

22 games were played in 6 groups, with 3 points given for wins and 1 for draws. Sarpsborg, Odd, Sandefjord, Haugesund, Aalesund and Stålkameratene were promoted to the First Division. Number ten, eleven and twelve were relegated to the 3. divisjon. The winning teams from each of the 19 groups in the 3. divisjon were promoted to the 2. divisjon.

== League tables ==
=== Group 1 ===
Pos	Team	Pld	W	D	L	GF	GA	GD	Pts	Promotion or relegation
1	Sarpsborg (P)	22	14	5	3	48	20	+28	47	Promotion to First Division
2	Fredrikstad	22	14	4	4	57	23	+34	46	
3	Steinkjer	22	14	4	4	51	28	+23	46	
4	Råde	22	11	1	10	38	32	+6	34	
5	Elverum	22	9	6	7	44	29	+15	33	
6	Nybergsund	22	9	6	7	37	35	+2	33	
7	Faaberg	22	9	4	9	35	36	−1	31	
8	Verdal	22	7	5	10	30	38	−8	26	
9	Sprint-Jeløy	22	7	4	11	43	49	−6	25	
10	Selbak (R)	22	7	3	12	35	54	−19	24	Relegation to Third Division
11	Tynset (R)	22	4	4	14	17	41	−24	16	Relegation to Third Division
12	Namsos (R)	22	4	0	18	2	72	−70	12	Relegation to Third Division

(P) Promoted; (R) Relegated

=== Group 2 ===
Pos	Team	Pld	W	D	L	GF	GA	GD	Pts	Promotion or relegation
1	Odd (P)	22	16	3	3	69	20	+49	51	Promotion to First Division
2	Fossum	22	12	6	4	40	23	+17	42	
3	Ullern	22	12	3	7	51	34	+17	39	
4	Lyn 2 (R)	22	12	2	8	52	43	+9	38	Relegation to Third Division
5	Ski	22	10	3	9	35	30	+5	33	
6	Åssiden	22	9	3	10	37	38	−1	30	
7	Pors	22	8	4	10	27	39	−12	28	
8	Start 2	22	7	6	9	42	36	+6	27	
9	Kjelsås	22	6	8	8	20	34	−14	26	
10	Mercantile (R)	22	6	3	13	27	44	−17	21	Relegation to Third Division
11	Holmen (R)	22	5	6	11	28	46	−18	21	Relegation to Third Division
12	Mandalskameratene (R)	22	4	3	15	26	67	−41	15	Relegation to Third Division

(P) Promoted; (R) Relegated

=== Group 3 ===
Pos	Team	Pld	W	D	L	GF	GA	GD	Pts	Promotion or relegation
1	Sandefjord (P)	22	15	6	1	51	13	+38	51	Promotion to First Division
2	Falk	22	11	6	5	39	27	+12	39	
3	Fram Larvik	22	11	4	7	40	35	+5	37	
4	Strømmen	22	12	1	9	31	26	+5	37	
5	Sørumsand	22	8	6	8	33	26	+7	30	
6	Lillestrøm 2	22	9	3	10	37	36	+1	30	
7	Runar	22	8	5	9	45	41	+4	29	
8	Lørenskog	22	9	1	12	38	43	−5	28	
9	Ørn-Horten	22	7	6	9	28	28	0	27	
10	Holter	22	8	2	12	27	48	−21	26	
11	Aurskog-Finstadbru (R)	22	6	6	10	24	40	−16	24	Relegation to Third Division
12	Grue (R)	22	3	4	15	22	52	−30	13	Relegation to Third Division

(P) Promoted; (R) Relegated

=== Group 4 ===
Pos	Team	Pld	W	D	L	GF	GA	GD	Pts	Promotion or relegation
1	Haugesund (P)	22	18	3	1	56	15	+41	57	Promotion to First Division
2	Flekkefjord	22	13	5	4	56	36	+20	44	
3	Ålgård	22	11	7	4	39	29	+10	40	
4	Hana	22	11	1	10	37	32	+5	34	
5	Os	22	11	1	10	35	38	−3	34	
6	Bjørnar	22	9	4	9	40	37	+3	31	
7	Klepp	22	8	5	9	37	44	−7	29	
8	Viking 2	22	8	4	10	45	46	−1	28	
9	Vedavåg	22	6	7	9	34	41	−7	25	
10	Kopervik	22	7	3	12	32	41	−9	24	
11	Brann 2 (R)	22	4	2	16	30	49	−19	14	Relegation to Third Division
12	Ulf-Sandnes (R)	22	3	4	15	31	64	−33	13	Relegation to Third Division

(P) Promoted; (R) Relegated

=== Group 5 ===
Pos	Team	Pld	W	D	L	GF	GA	GD	Pts	Promotion or relegation
1	Aalesund (P)	22	17	3	2	94	26	+68	54	Promotion to First Division
2	Byåsen	22	15	3	4	61	25	+36	48	
3	Rosenborg 2	22	13	3	6	54	30	+24	42	
4	Orkdal	22	13	2	7	47	34	+13	41	
5	Kolstad	22	12	3	7	57	38	+19	39	
6	Clausenengen	22	9	4	9	48	43	+5	31	
7	Florø	22	9	3	10	38	52	−14	30	
8	Melhus	22	7	7	8	43	51	−8	28	
9	Ørsta	22	8	3	11	38	49	−11	27	
10	Langevåg (R)	22	5	3	14	31	49	−18	18	Relegation to Third Division
11	Volda (R)	22	3	3	16	21	73	−52	12	Relegation to Third Division
12	Sunndal (R)	22	2	1	19	17	79	−62	7	Relegation to Third Division

(P) Promoted; (R) Relegated

=== Group 6 ===
Pos	Team	Pld	W	D	L	GF	GA	GD	Pts	Promotion or relegation
1	Stålkameratene (P)	22	17	3	2	63	28	+35	54	Promotion to First Division
2	Grovfjord	22	14	1	7	61	33	+28	43	
3	Gevir Bodø	22	13	3	6	58	38	+20	42	
4	Skarp	22	11	4	7	68	48	+20	37	
5	Harstad	22	9	9	4	56	26	+30	36	
6	Mo/Bossmo	22	10	4	8	55	41	+14	34	
7	Sortland	22	9	5	8	41	44	−3	32	
8	Lyngen/Karnes	22	9	2	11	42	38	+4	29	
9	Silsand/Omegn	22	8	1	13	43	72	−29	25	
10	Narvik/Nor (R)	22	6	3	13	31	48	−17	21	Relegation to Third Division
11	Norild (R)	22	5	2	15	26	67	−41	17	Relegation to Third Division
12	Tromsø 2 (R)	22	2	1	19	25	86	−61	7	Relegation to Third Division

(P) Promoted; (R) Relegated
