= Nardo FK =

Norwegian football club

- Full name: Nardo Fotballklubb
- Founded: 14 January 1971; 55 years ago
- Ground: Nissekollen; Trondheim
- Manager: Tormod Bjerkeset
- League: 3. divisjon
- 2024: 3. divisjon Group 4, 2nd of 14
Home colours	Away colours

Nardo Fotballklubb is a Norwegian football club from Trondheim. The men's team currently plays in the 3. divisjon, having been relegated from the 2. divisjon in 2021. The club played on the second tier from 1993 to 1996.

== History ==
The club was formed on 14 January 1971 by a group of former Nidelv IL members. The club played its first season in the 6. divisjon (seventh tier) in 1972, and won promotion the next year. After two decades at amateur level, the club earned some success under coach Roar Stokke, and was promoted from the fourth tier to the second tier, where they were fighting for promotion to Tippeligaen, and achieved a fourth place in the 1993 1. divisjon. Stokke resigned from his position in September 1995 after disagreements with the board of directors. In 1996, the club was relegated from the 1. divisjon, and have since alternated between the 2. divisjon and the 3. divisjon. The club won promotion from the 3. divisjon in 2008, after beating Tiller 4-3 on aggregate in the promotion play-offs.

== Current squad ==
As of 14 July 2020. Note: Flags indicate national team as defined under FIFA eligibility rules; some limited exceptions apply. Players may hold more than one non-FIFA nationality.

No.	Pos.	Nation	Player
1	GK	NOR	Henrik Mathias Bakke
2	DF	NOR	Sander Grønli Nordeide
3	DF	NOR	Magnus Gullhaug Fløholm
4	DF	NOR	Marius Sandvik
5	DF	NOR	Stian Bjarnar Samdal
6	MF	NOR	Fredrik Malt Arnstad
7	DF	NOR	Jarl Magnus Ernstsen Knutsen
8	MF	NOR	Andreas Bergo Krokbø
9	DF	NOR	Øyvind Pettersen
10	FW	NOR	Mats Romsdalen
11	FW	NOR	Jørgen Kjøsnes Valleraunet

No.	Pos.	Nation	Player
12	GK	NOR	Preben Øien
13	FW	NOR	Robert Stene
14	MF	NOR	Jørgen Wisth Lie
15	DF	NOR	Andreas Dyrnes Søfteland
16	MF	NOR	Einar Corneliussen Storvik
17	DF	NOR	Mathias Jullumstrø Winum
19	FW	NOR	Arne Gunnes
20	DF	NOR	Simen Kjørstad
22	DF	ISL	Ottar Huni Magnusson
23	MF	NOR	Andreas Rosnes
24	MF	NOR	Erik Eikeng

== Recent history ==
Season		Pos.	Pl.	W	D	L	GS	GA	P	Cup	Notes
2006	3. divisjon	↑ 1	22	18	1	3	84	25	55	First round	Promoted to the 2. divisjon
2007	2. divisjon	↓ 13	26	5	5	16	32	66	20	First round	Relegated to the 3. divisjon
2008	3. divisjon	↑ 1	22	19	0	3	85	30	57	Second round	Promoted to the 2. divisjon
2009	2. divisjon	8	26	9	8	9	37	38	35	First round	
2010	2. divisjon	6	26	9	7	10	44	46	34	Second round	
2011	2. divisjon	11	26	8	5	13	43	55	29	First round	
2012	2. divisjon	2	26	15	5	6	58	42	50	Second round	
2013	2. divisjon	9	26	8	8	10	50	49	32	First round	
2014	2. divisjon	7	26	10	8	8	41	42	38	First round	
2015	2. divisjon	3	26	12	5	9	39	37	41	First round	
2016	2. divisjon	7	26	11	6	9	28	36	39	Third round	
2017	2. divisjon	7	26	12	4	10	29	35	40	First round	
2018	2. divisjon	10	26	8	7	11	33	44	31	First round	
2019	2. divisjon	11	26	8	5	13	27	43	27	Second round	
2020	2. divisjon	10	13	2	6	5	12	20	12	Cancelled	
2021	2. divisjon	↓ 13	26	6	6	14	31	55	24	Fourth round	Relegated to the 3. divisjon

== Records ==
Accomplishment	Record
Most matches	Terje Myrseth 215
Most goals	Arild Nordfjærn 81
Most goals scored in one season	40, Arild Nordfjærn in 1991 3. divisjon
Most goals scored in one match	8, Arild Nordfjærn vs. Sørlia IL in 1991 3. divisjon
Highest transfer fee received	Tor Trondsen, 300,000 kr to Moss in 1997; Fredrik Horn, 250,000 kr to Bryne in 1994; Roar Strand, 100,000 kr to Rosenborg
Highest attendance	ca 1,200 vs Tromsdalen in 1993
Best league position	4th place in the 1. divisjon in 1994
Best Norwegian Cup performance	Third Round in 1992
Greatest victory	13–1 in 1991
Heaviest loss	0–9 vs Selbu in 1982
