= Drøbak-Frogn IL =

Norwegian sports club

- Full name: Drøbak-Frogn Idrettslag
- Founded: 6 April 1946
- Ground: Seiersten stadion, Drøbak
- Capacity: 2,000
- Chairman: Trym Klingenberg
- Manager: Even Ødegaard
- League: 3. divisjon
- 2018: 3. divisjon Group 1, 8th of 14
Home colours	Away colours

Drøbak-Frogn IL, DFI, is a Norwegian sports club from Drøbak. It has sections for association football, badminton, basketball, table tennis, floorball, team handball, orienteering, gymnastics, cycling, alpine skiing, and Nordic skiing.

It can trace its roots back to the club Drøbak IF, founded in 1918. In 1946 it was merged to form Drøbak-Frogn IL, together with Drøbak BK (founded 1920) and Frogn IL (founded 1934).

== Football ==
The men's football team currently plays in the 3. divisjon, the fourth tier of Norwegian football. Seiersten stadion is their home field. Their team colors are red and white.

Drøbak/Frogn came close to being promoted to the Norwegian top division several times in the 1990s. In 1992 the club played in the promotion play-offs, beating Strømmen IF 2–0 at home, but losing 1–2 away to Hamarkameratene in the decisive match. Drøbak/Frogn finished third in the Norwegian First Division in 1994 and 1995, and fourth in 1993 and 1996. The team was relegated from the second tier in 1997, and has since played at the third and fourth tiers of Norwegian football.

Former players include Bent Skammelsrud, Prince Efe Ehiorobo and Per Edmund Mordt.

== Recent history ==
Season		Pos.	Pl.	W	D	L	GS	GA	P	Cup	Notes
2004	2. divisjon	8	26	7	12	7	48	44	33	First round	
2005	2. divisjon	5	26	13	0	13	64	41	39	Second round	
2006	2. divisjon	6	26	10	6	10	59	47	36	Second round	
2007	2. divisjon	3	26	15	3	8	68	36	48	Third round	
2008	2. divisjon	5	26	12	5	9	51	40	41	First round	
2009	2. divisjon	↓ 13	26	6	2	18	45	64	20	Second round	Relegated to the 3. divisjon
2010	3. divisjon	3	26	16	4	6	77	37	51	First round	
2011	3. divisjon	3	24	15	3	6	58	30	48	First round	
2012	3. divisjon	↑ 1	26	20	4	2	72	26	64	Second qualifying round	Promoted to the 2. divisjon
2013	2. divisjon	7	26	12	4	10	41	47	40	First round	
2014	2. divisjon	↓ 12	26	4	3	19	37	92	15	First round	Relegated to the 3. divisjon
2015	3. divisjon	8	26	10	7	9	57	59	37	First qualifying round	
2016	3. divisjon	5	26	16	3	7	84	33	51	First qualifying round	
